= 2022 Northeast Grand Prix =

2022 edition of motor race

Track map of Lime Rock Park

The 2022 Northeast Grand Prix (known as the 2022 FCP Euro Northeast Grand Prix for sponsorship reasons) was a sports car race sanctioned by the International Motor Sports Association (IMSA). The race was held at Lime Rock Park in Lakeville, Connecticut, on July 16, 2022. This race was the ninth round of the 2022 IMSA SportsCar Championship, and the sixth round of the 2022 WeatherTech Sprint Cup.

The race was won by the No. 9 GTD Pro entry of Pfaff Motorsports, driven by Matt Campbell and Mathieu Jaminet. The GTD class victory was taken by the No. 1 BMW M4 GT3 of Paul Miller Racing, piloted by Bryan Sellers and Madison Snow. The race for the GTD class victory came down to the last corner, with the leading #57 Mercedes-AMG GT3 of Winward Racing falling victim to a fuel pump failure and fading to fifth in class.

== Background ==
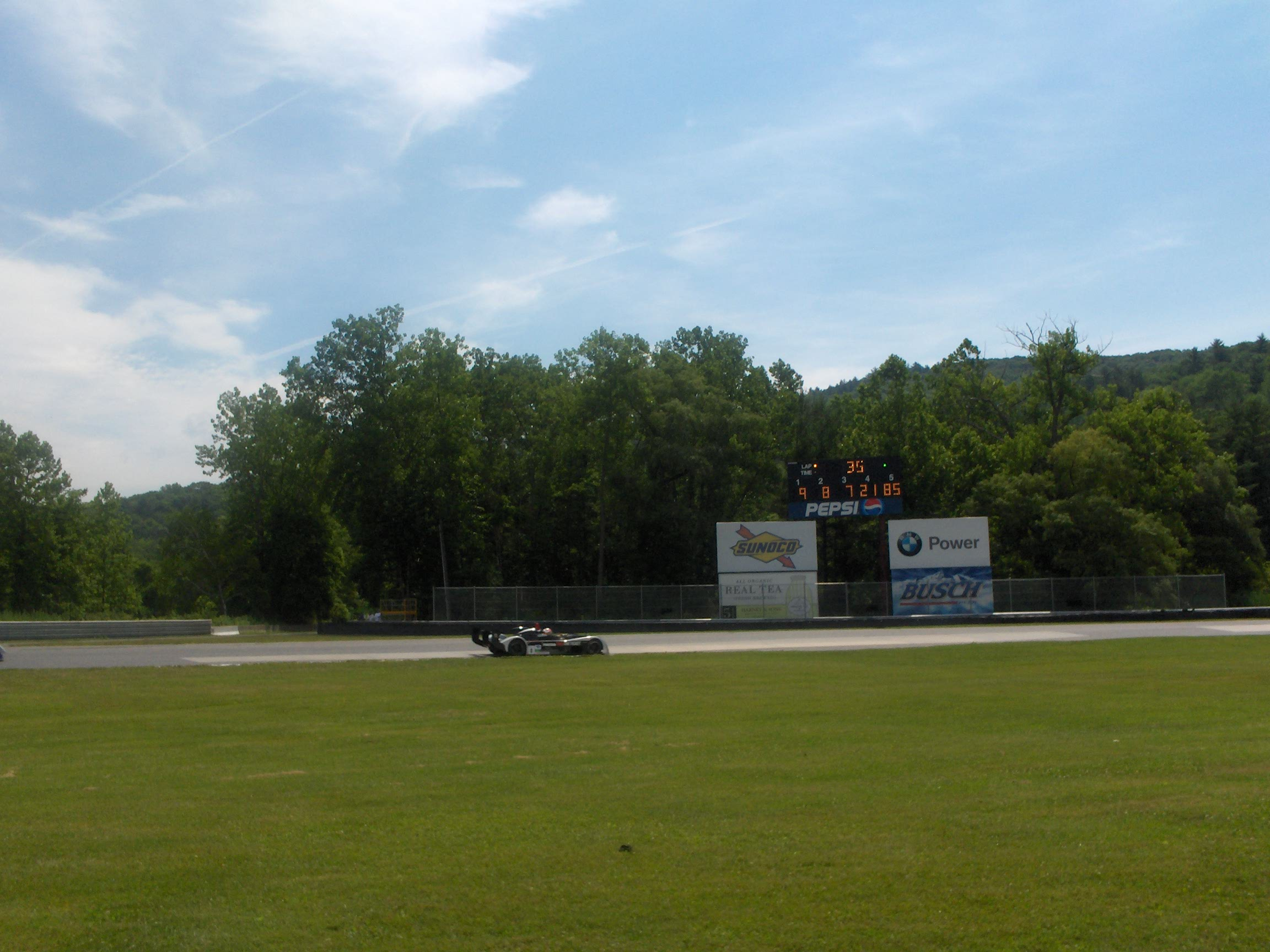
Lime Rock Park, where the race was held.

International Motor Sports Association's (IMSA) president John Doonan confirmed the race was part of the schedule for the 2022 IMSA SportsCar Championship (IMSA SCC) in August 2021. It was the seventh year the event was held as part of the WeatherTech SportsCar Championship. The 2022 Northeast Grand Prix was the ninth of twelve scheduled sports car races of 2022 by IMSA, and it was the sixth of eight rounds held as part of the WeatherTech Sprint Cup. The race was held at the seven-turn 1.530 mi (2.462 km) Lime Rock Park in Lakeville, Connecticut on July 16, 2022.

The event marked 50 years since the first IMSA-sanctioned event held at the circuit, which took place as part of the 1972 IMSA GT Championship. As a result, 1972 overall winner Bob Bailey served as the grand marshal for the 2022 edition of the event. As in previous years, it would be the first of two GT-only rounds of the IMSA SportsCar Championship, in which only the GTD Pro and GTD classes competed. In June, Connecticut-based auto parts retailer FCP Euro was announced as the race's title sponsor. FCP Euro also fielded an entry in the Michelin Pilot Challenge event that weekend, which served as the sole IMSA-sanctioned support race. The race, officially labeled the Lime Rock Park 120, was won by the #71 Rebel Rock Racing entry of Frank DePew and Robin Liddell.

On July 6, 2022, IMSA released the latest technical bulletin outlining Balance of Performance for the event. The lone change was a two-liter fuel capacity increase for the Lexus RC F GT3.

The #23 Heart of Racing Team entry entered the event as defending GTD-class winners, while the GTD Pro class would compete at Lime Rock for the first time in class history.

Before the race, Matt Campbell and Mathieu Jaminet led the GTD Pro Drivers' Championship with 2056 points, 138 ahead of Antonio García and Jordan Taylor in second. In GTD, Stevan McAleer led the Drivers' Championship with 1765 points, 5 points ahead of Ryan Hardwick and Jan Heylen in second followed by Bill Auberlen and Robby Foley in third with 1721 points. Porsche and BMW were leading their respective Manufactures' Championships while Pfaff Motorsports and Gilbert Korthoff Motorsports each led their own Teams' Championships.

=== Entries ===
A total of 15 cars took part in the event, split across two classes. 5 cars were entered in GTD Pro, and 10 in GTD. GTD Pro saw a reduced entry total after the No. 79 WeatherTech Racing entry of Cooper MacNeil and returning co-driver Jules Gounon moved to the GTD class, having competed in the Pro class for the first six events of the season. MacNeil, an FIA Silver-rated driver, had been eligible to compete in the Pro-Am GTD class for the entire season, and cited the change as an effort to support Mercedes-AMG's push for the GTD manufacturer's championship as well as for undisclosed internal reasons. Jack Hawksworth, who drove the No. 14 GTD Pro entry for Vasser Sullivan Racing, returned after missing the previous two rounds due to injuries suffered in a motocross accident. In GTD, several teams returned after forgoing the international round at Canadian Tire Motorsport Park, which only paid points towards the WeatherTech Sprint Cup. Wright Motorsports and Team Korthoff Motorsports returned, as did CarBahn with Peregrine Racing, who had sourced a replacement Lamborghini Huracán GT3 chassis after damaging their primary car during the 6 Hours of Watkins Glen in June. The Inception Racing McLaren did not return after skipping the race at Mosport, as the team continued to juggle a dual North American and European campaign.

== Practice ==
There were two practice sessions preceding the start of the race on Saturday, both on Friday. The first session lasted 80 minutes on Friday morning while the second session lasted for 75 minutes on Friday afternoon.

=== Practice 1 ===
The first practice session took place at 11:25 am ET and ended with John Edwards topping the charts for BMW M Team RLL, with a lap time of 51.735.

Pos.	Class	No.	Team	Driver	Time	Gap
1	GTD Pro	25	BMW M Team RLL	John Edwards	51.735	_
2	GTD	39	CarBahn with Peregrine Racing	Robert Megennis	51.814	+0.079
3	GTD Pro	14	Vasser Sullivan Racing	Jack Hawksworth	51.820	+0.085

=== Practice 2 ===
The second practice session took place at 3:05 pm ET and ended with Matt Campbell topping the charts for Pfaff Motorsports, with a lap time of 51.050.

Pos.	Class	No.	Team	Driver	Time	Gap
1	GTD Pro	9	Pfaff Motorsports	Matt Campbell	51.050	_
2	GTD Pro	3	Corvette Racing	Jordan Taylor	51.101	+0.051
3	GTD Pro	14	Vasser Sullivan Racing	Jack Hawksworth	51.263	+0.213

== Qualifying ==
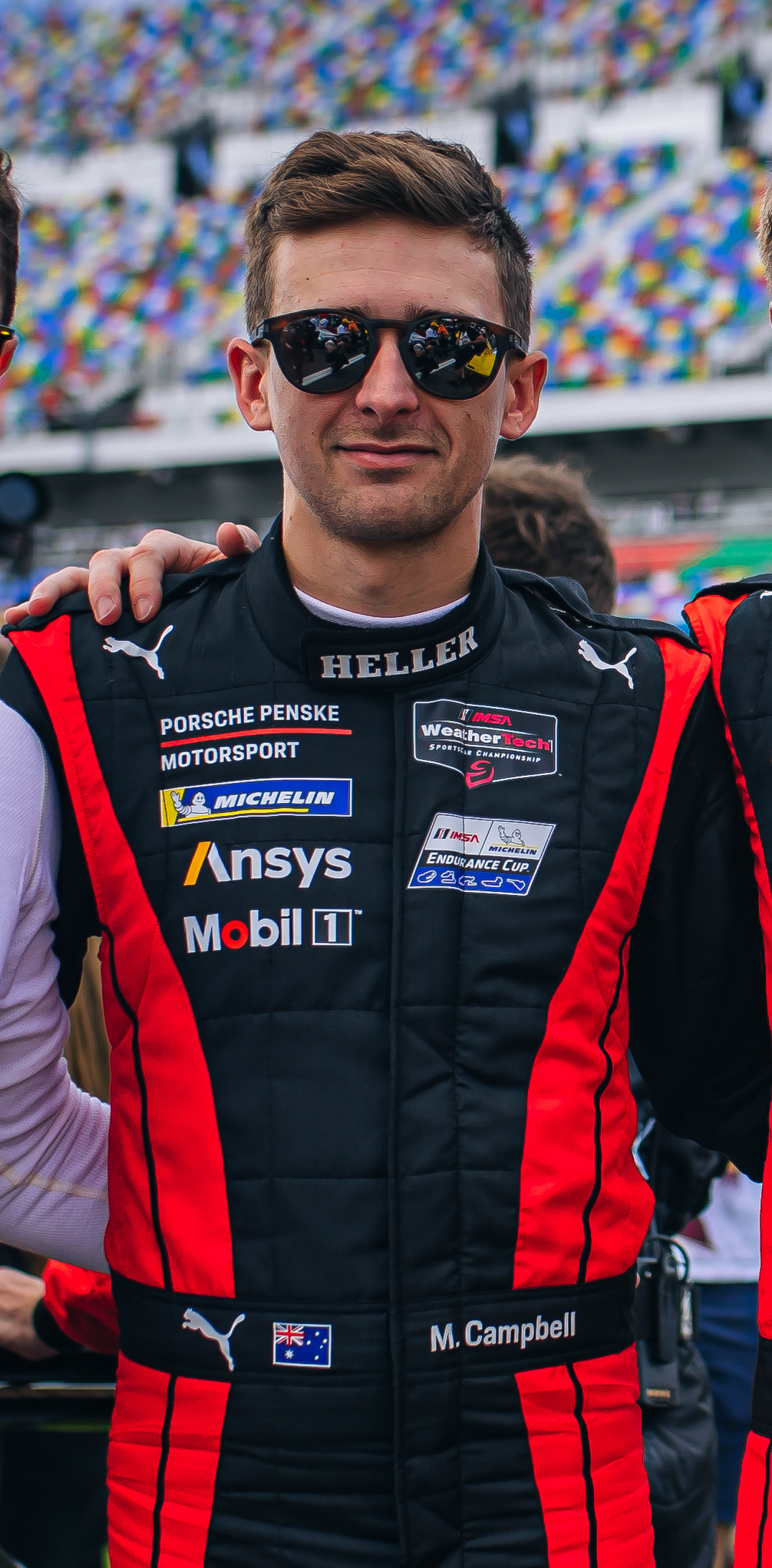
Matt Campbell (pictured in 2024) helped take the No. 9 Porsche's third pole position of 2022.

Friday's afternoon qualifying was broken into one session for the GTD Pro and GTD classes, which lasted for 15 minutes. The rules dictated that all teams nominated a driver to qualify their cars, with the Pro-Am (GTD) class requiring a Bronze/Silver Rated Driver to qualify the car. The competitors' fastest lap times determined the starting order.

Matt Campbell took overall pole for Pfaff Motorsports, while Frankie Montecalvo and Vasser Sullivan Racing scored pole in GTD.

=== Qualifying results ===
Pole positions in each class are indicated in bold and by ‡.

Pos.	Class	No.	Team	Driver	Time	Gap	Grid
1	**GTD Pro**	**9**	**(Canada) Pfaff Motorsports**	**(Australia) Matt Campbell**	**51.079**	**_**	1‡
2	GTD Pro	14	(United States) Vasser Sullivan Racing	(United Kingdom) Jack Hawksworth	51.097	+0.018	2
3	GTD Pro	25	(United States) BMW M Team RLL	(United States) Connor De Phillippi	51.227	+0.148	15 (Note: The no. 25 BMW M Team RLL entry was moved to the back of the grid due to a ride height infraction.)
4	GTD Pro	23	(United States) Heart of Racing Team	(United Kingdom) Ross Gunn	51.281	+0.202	3
5	GTD Pro	3	(United States) Corvette Racing	(United States) Jordan Taylor	51.302	+0.202	4
6	**GTD**	**12**	**(United States) Vasser Sullivan Racing**	**(United States) Frankie Montecalvo**	**51.459**	**+0.380**	5‡
7	GTD	39	(United States) CarBahn with Peregrine Racing	(United States) Robert Megennis	51.465	+0.386	6
8	GTD	27	(United States) Heart of Racing Team	(Canada) Roman De Angelis	51.477	+0.398	7
9	GTD	96	(United States) Turner Motorsport	(United States) Robby Foley	51.490	+0.411	8
10	GTD	32	(United States) Team Korthoff Motorsports	(United Kingdom) Stevan McAleer	51.516	+0.437	9
11	GTD	57	(United States) Winward Racing	(United States) Russell Ward	51.517	+0.438	10
12	GTD	1	(United States) Paul Miller Racing	(United States) Madison Snow	51.651	+0.572	11
13	GTD	51	(Philippines) RWR Eurasia Motorsport	(Australia) Aidan Read	51.741	+0.662	12
14	GTD	79	(United States) WeatherTech Racing	(United States) Cooper MacNeil	52.213	+1.134	13
15	GTD	16	(United States) Wright Motorsports	(United States) Ryan Hardwick	52.312	+1.233	14

== Warm-Up ==
The morning warm-up took place at 9:05 am ET and ended with Jules Gounon topping the charts for WeatherTech Racing, with a lap time of 51.342.

Pos.	Class	No.	Team	Driver	Time	Gap
1	GTD	79	WeatherTech Racing	Jules Gounon	51.342	_
2	GTD	16	Wright Motorsports	Jan Heylen	51.783	+0.441
3	GTD Pro	3	Corvette Racing	Antonio García	51.877	+0.535

== Race ==
=== Post-Race ===
With a total of 2441 points, Campbell and Jaminet's victory increased their advantage to 226 points over García and Taylor while De Phillippi and Edwards took over fifth position in the GTD Pro Drivers' Championship. The final results of GTD meant McAleer increased his points lead to 40 points over Hardwick and Heylen while De Angelis took over third position in the Drivers' Championship. Porsche and BMW continued to top their respective Manufacturers' Championships, while Pfaff Motorsports and Gilbert Korthoff Motorsports kept their respective advantages in their Teams' Championships with three rounds remaining.

=== Race results ===
Class winners are denoted in bold and ‡.

Pos	Class	No.	Team	Drivers	Chassis	Laps	Time/Retired
Pos	Class	No.	Team	Drivers	Engine	Laps	Time/Retired
1	**GTD; Pro**	**9**	**(Canada) Pfaff Motorsports**	**(Australia) Matt Campbell (France) Mathieu Jaminet**	**Porsche 911 GT3 R**	**174**	**2:40:43.134‡**
1	**GTD; Pro**	**9**	**(Canada) Pfaff Motorsports**	**(Australia) Matt Campbell (France) Mathieu Jaminet**	**Porsche 4.0 L Flat-6**	**174**	**2:40:43.134‡**
2	GTD; Pro	23	(United States) Heart of Racing Team	(United Kingdom) Ross Gunn (Spain) Alex Riberas	Aston Martin Vantage AMR GT3	174	+1.883
2	GTD; Pro	23	(United States) Heart of Racing Team	(United Kingdom) Ross Gunn (Spain) Alex Riberas	Aston Martin 4.0 L Turbo V8	174	+1.883
3	GTD; Pro	14	(United States) Vasser Sullivan Racing	(United Kingdom) Ben Barnicoat (United Kingdom) Jack Hawksworth	Lexus RC F GT3	174	+4.078
3	GTD; Pro	14	(United States) Vasser Sullivan Racing	(United Kingdom) Ben Barnicoat (United Kingdom) Jack Hawksworth	Toyota 2UR 5.0 L V8	174	+4.078
4	**GTD**	**1**	**(United States) Paul Miller Racing**	**(United States) Bryan Sellers (United States) Madison Snow**	**BMW M4 GT3**	**174**	**+8.842‡**
4	**GTD**	**1**	**(United States) Paul Miller Racing**	**(United States) Bryan Sellers (United States) Madison Snow**	**BMW S58B30T0 3.0 L Twin Turbo I6**	**174**	**+8.842‡**
5	GTD	27	(United States) Heart of Racing Team	(Canada) Roman De Angelis (Belgium) Maxime Martin	Aston Martin Vantage AMR GT3	174	+9.473
5	GTD	27	(United States) Heart of Racing Team	(Canada) Roman De Angelis (Belgium) Maxime Martin	Aston Martin 4.0 L Turbo V8	174	+9.473
6	GTD	39	(United States) CarBahn with Peregrine Racing	(United States) Robert Megennis (United States) Jeff Westphal	Lamborghini Huracán GT3 Evo	174	+9.532
6	GTD	39	(United States) CarBahn with Peregrine Racing	(United States) Robert Megennis (United States) Jeff Westphal	Lamborghini 5.2 L V10	174	+9.532
7	GTD	32	(United States) Team Korthoff Motorsports	(United Kingdom) Stevan McAleer (United States) Mike Skeen	Mercedes-AMG GT3 Evo	174	+9.641
7	GTD	32	(United States) Team Korthoff Motorsports	(United Kingdom) Stevan McAleer (United States) Mike Skeen	Mercedes-AMG M159 6.2 L V8	174	+9.641
8	GTD	57	(United States) Winward Racing	(United Kingdom) Philip Ellis (United States) Russell Ward	Mercedes-AMG GT3 Evo	174	+17.960
8	GTD	57	(United States) Winward Racing	(United Kingdom) Philip Ellis (United States) Russell Ward	Mercedes-AMG M159 6.2 L V8	174	+17.960
9	GTD	16	(United States) Wright Motorsports	(United States) Ryan Hardwick (Belgium) Jan Heylen	Porsche 911 GT3 R	174	+22.317
9	GTD	16	(United States) Wright Motorsports	(United States) Ryan Hardwick (Belgium) Jan Heylen	Porsche 4.0 L Flat-6	174	+22.317
10 (Note: The #79 WeatherTech Racing entry received a 23-second time penalty for failing to serve a drive-through.)	GTD	79	(United States) WeatherTech Racing	(France) Jules Gounon (United States) Cooper MacNeil	Mercedes-AMG GT3 Evo	174	+33.800
10	GTD	79	(United States) WeatherTech Racing	(France) Jules Gounon (United States) Cooper MacNeil	Mercedes-AMG M159 6.2 L V8	174	+33.800
11	GTD	12	(United States) Vasser Sullivan Racing	(United States) Frankie Montecalvo (United States) Aaron Telitz	Lexus RC F GT3	174	+40.276
11	GTD	12	(United States) Vasser Sullivan Racing	(United States) Frankie Montecalvo (United States) Aaron Telitz	Toyota 2UR 5.0 L V8	174	+40.276
12	GTD; Pro	3	(United States) Corvette Racing	(Spain) Antonio García (United States) Jordan Taylor	Chevrolet Corvette C8.R GTD	169	+5 Laps
12	GTD; Pro	3	(United States) Corvette Racing	(Spain) Antonio García (United States) Jordan Taylor	Chevrolet 5.5 L V8	169	+5 Laps
13 DNF	GTD	51	(United States) Rick Ware Racing	(United States) Ryan Eversley (Australia) Aidan Read	Acura NSX GT3 Evo22	150	Accident
13 DNF	GTD	51	(United States) Rick Ware Racing	(United States) Ryan Eversley (Australia) Aidan Read	Acura 3.5 L Turbo V6	150	Accident
14 DNF	GTD; Pro	25	(United States) BMW M Team RLL	(United States) John Edwards (United States) Connor De Phillippi	BMW M4 GT3	77	Mechanical
14 DNF	GTD; Pro	25	(United States) BMW M Team RLL	(United States) John Edwards (United States) Connor De Phillippi	BMW S58B30T0 3.0 L Twin Turbo I6	77	Mechanical
15 DNF	GTD	96	(United States) Turner Motorsport	(United States) Bill Auberlen (United States) Robby Foley	BMW M4 GT3	33	Mechanical
15 DNF	GTD	96	(United States) Turner Motorsport	(United States) Bill Auberlen (United States) Robby Foley	BMW S58B30T0 3.0 L Twin Turbo I6	33	Mechanical

== Standings after the race ==
DPi Drivers' Championship standings
Pos.	+/–	Driver	Points
1		(United Kingdom) Tom Blomqvist (United Kingdom) Oliver Jarvis	2737
2		(Portugal) Filipe Albuquerque (United States) Ricky Taylor	2681
3		(France) Sébastien Bourdais (Netherlands) Renger van der Zande	2589
4		(United Kingdom) Alex Lynn (New Zealand) Earl Bamber	2547
5		(Brazil) Pipo Derani	2463

LMP2 Drivers' Championship standings
Pos.	+/–	Driver	Points
1		(Canada) John Farano	1294
2		(Colombia) Juan Pablo Montoya (Sweden) Henrik Hedman	1257
3		(United States) Steven Thomas (United States) Jonathan Bomarito	1232
4		(United Kingdom) Ryan Dalziel (United States) Dwight Merriman	1227
5		(Denmark) Dennis Andersen (Denmark) Anders Fjordbach	1188

LMP3 Drivers' Championship standings
Pos.	+/–	Driver	Points
1		(United States) Jon Bennett (United States) Colin Braun	1391
2		(Canada) Garett Grist (United States) Ari Balogh	1293
3		(United States) Gar Robinson	1253
4		(Portugal) João Barbosa (United States) Lance Willsey	1203
5		(United States) Jarett Andretti (Colombia) Gabby Chaves	1122

GTD Pro Drivers' Championship standings
Pos.	+/–	Driver	Points
1		(Australia) Matt Campbell (France) Mathieu Jaminet	2441
2		(Spain) Antonio García (United States) Jordan Taylor	2226
3		(United Kingdom) Ben Barnicoat	2181
4		(United Kingdom) Ross Gunn (Spain) Alex Riberas	2170
5	1	(United States) Connor De Phillippi (United States) John Edwards	1946

GTD Drivers' Championship standings
Pos.	+/–	Driver	Points
1		(United Kingdom) Stevan McAleer	2071
2		(United States) Ryan Hardwick (Belgium) Jan Heylen	2031
3	1	(Canada) Roman De Angelis	2010
4	1	(United States) Bill Auberlen (United States) Robby Foley	1959
5		(United States) Robert Megennis (United States) Jeff Westphal	1881

- Note: Only the top five positions are included for all sets of standings.

DPi Teams' Championship standings
Pos.	+/–	Team	Points
1		(United States) #60 Meyer Shank Racing w/ Curb-Agajanian	2737
2		(United States) #10 WTR - Konica Minolta Acura	2681
3		(United States) #01 Cadillac Racing	2589
4		(United States) #02 Cadillac Racing	2547
5		(United States) #31 Whelen Engineering Racing	2463

LMP2 Teams' Championship standings
Pos.	+/–	Team	Points
1		(United States) #52 PR1/Mathiasen Motorsports	1367
2		(United States) #8 Tower Motorsport	1294
3		(United States) #81 DragonSpeed USA	1257
4		(United States) #11 PR1/Mathiasen Motorsports	1232
5		(United States) #18 Era Motorsport	1227

LMP3 Teams' Championship standings
Pos.	+/–	Team	Points
1		(United States) #54 CORE Autosport	1391
2		(United States) #30 Jr III Motorsports	1293
3		(United States) #74 Riley Motorsports	1253
4		(United States) #33 Sean Creech Motorsport	1203
5		(United States) #36 Andretti Autosport	1122

GTD Pro Teams' Championship standings
Pos.	+/–	Team	Points
1		(Canada) #9 Pfaff Motorsports	2441
2		(United States) #3 Corvette Racing	2226
3		(United States) #14 Vasser Sullivan Racing	2181
4		(United States) #23 Heart of Racing Team	2170
5	1	(United States) #25 BMW M Team RLL	1946

GTD Teams' Championship standings
Pos.	+/–	Team	Points
1		(United States) #32 Gilbert Korthoff Motorsports	2071
2		(United States) #16 Wright Motorsports	2031
3	1	(United States) #27 Heart of Racing Team	2010
4	1	(United States) #96 Turner Motorsport	1959
5		(United States) #39 CarBahn with Peregrine Racing	1881

- Note: Only the top five positions are included for all sets of standings.

DPi Manufacturers' Championship standings
Pos.	+/–	Manufacturer	Points
1		(Japan) Acura	2948
2		(United States) Cadillac	2948

GTD Pro Manufacturers' Championship standings
Pos.	+/–	Manufacturer	Points
1		(Germany) Porsche	2441
2	1	(United Kingdom) Aston Martin	2240
3	1	(United States) Chevrolet	2236
4		(Japan) Lexus	2211
5	1	(Germany) BMW	2031

GTD Manufacturers' Championship standings
Pos.	+/–	Manufacturer	Points
1		(Germany) BMW	2327
2		(United Kingdom) Aston Martin	2281
3		(Germany) Mercedes-AMG	2186
4		(Germany) Porsche	2141
5	1	(Italy) Lamborghini	2091

- Note: Only the top five positions are included for all sets of standings.

IMSA SportsCar Championship
Previous race: 2022 Chevrolet Grand Prix	2022 season	Next race: 2022 IMSA SportsCar Weekend
