= 2019 Monterey Grand Prix =

Eleventh round of the 2019 IMSA SportsCar Championship season

Track map of WeatherTech Raceway Laguna Seca

The 2019 Monterey Grand Prix was a sports car race sanctioned by the International Motor Sports Association (IMSA). The race was held at WeatherTech Raceway Laguna Seca in Monterey County, California, on September 15, 2019. This race was the eleventh round of the 2019 WeatherTech SportsCar Championship, and the seventh round of the WeatherTech Sprint Cup.

== Background ==
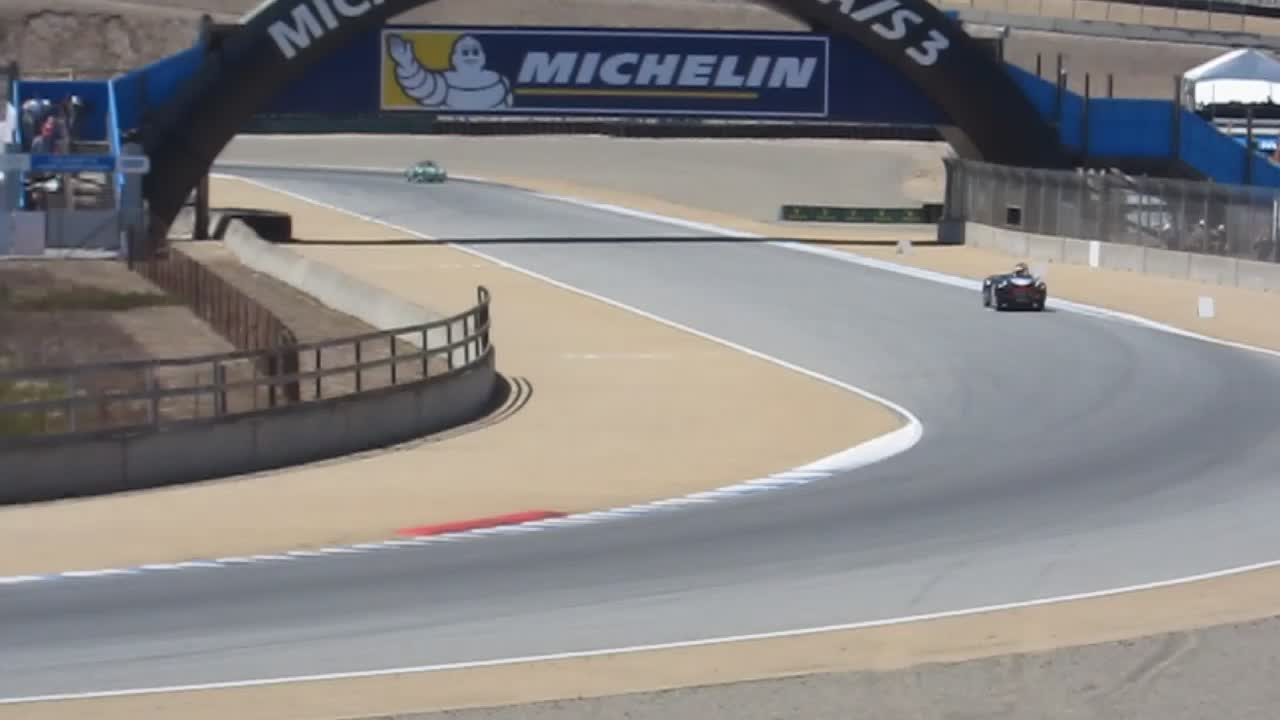
WeatherTech Raceway Laguna Seca, where the race was held.

International Motor Sports Association's (IMSA) president Scott Atherton confirmed the race was part of the schedule for the 2019 IMSA SportsCar Championship (IMSA SCC) in August 2018. It was the sixth consecutive year the event was held as part of the WeatherTech SportsCar Championship. The 2019 Monterey Grand Prix was the eleventh of twelve sports car races of 2019 by IMSA, and it was the last of seven rounds held as part of the WeatherTech Sprint Cup. The race was held at the eleven-turn 2.238 mi (3.602 km) WeatherTech Raceway Laguna Seca in Monterey County, California on September 15, 2019.

On September 6, 2019, IMSA released a technical bulletin regarding the Balance of Performance for the race. In the Daytona Prototype International (DPi) class, the Mazda RT24-P was given a 5-kilogram weight increase. The Cadillac DPI-V.R was made 20 kilograms lighter, as well as a 0.3-millimeter larger air restrictor, and a fuel capacity increase of 2 liters. No changes were made GTLM. In GTD, the Porsche 911 GT3 R and Lexus RC F GT3 were made 20 and 5 kilograms heavier, respectively. The Lamborghini Huracán GT3 Evo and McLaren 720S GT3 were made 10 kilograms lighter.

Before the race, Dane Cameron and Juan Pablo Montoya led the DPi Drivers' Championship with 239 points, 7 points ahead of Pipo Derani and Felipe Nasr. In LMP2, Matt McMurry led the Drivers' Championship with 200 points, ahead of Cameron Cassels. Earl Bamber and Laurens Vanthoor led the GTLM Drivers' Championship with 280 points; the duo held an eleven-point advantage over Patrick Pilet and Nick Tandy in second. With 241 points, Mario Farnbacher and Trent Hindman led the GTD Drivers' Championship, 37 points clear of Zacharie Robichon. Acura and Porsche were leading their respective Manufacturers' Championships, while Acura Team Penske, PR1/Mathiasen Motorsports, Porsche GT Team, and Meyer Shank Racing each led their own Teams' Championships.

=== Entries ===
A total of 32 cars took part in the event split across four classes. There were 10 cars in Daytona Prototype International, 2 entries in LMP2, 8 entries in GTLM, and 12 entries in GTD. In LMP2, Dalton Kellett returned to PR1 Mathiasen Motorsports after James French competed at Road America. In GTD, Lone Star Racing would not return for Laguna Seca. Christina Nielsen returned to the No. 57 Meyer Shank Racing entry after being substituted by Bia Figueiredo and Alice Powell in the 2 previous rounds.

== Practice ==
There were three practice sessions preceding the start of the race on Saturday, two on Friday and one on Saturday. The first session on Friday morning lasted 75 minutes while the second session on Friday afternoon lasted one hour. The third session on Saturday morning lasted one hour. In the first practice session, Oliver Jarvis set the fastest lap in the No. 77 Mazda at 1 minute, 16.442 seconds, 0.153 seconds faster than Juan Pablo Montoya's No. 6 Acura. Filipe Albuquerque in Mustang Sampling Racing's No. 5 Cadillac was third, and Renger van der Zande was fourth in the No. 10 Cadillac. Pipo Derani was fifth fastest for Whelen Engineering Racing while Tristan Vautier in the No. 85 JDC-Miller Motorsports Cadillac was sixth. Matt McMurry led LMP2 in the No. 52 PR1/ Mathiasen Motorsports Oreca 07. The GTLM class was topped by Richard Westbrook's No. 67 Ford GT with a lap of 1 minute, 22.548 seconds, 0.294 seconds faster than Tommy Milner's No. 4 Corvette. Jesse Krohn was third in the No. 24 BMW and Jan Magnussen was fourth fastest in the No. 3 Corvette. In GTD, Bryan Sellers in Paul Miller Racing's No. 48 Lamborghini lapped fastest with a time of 1 minute, 25.248 seconds, with Toni Vilander second in the No. 63 Scuderia Corsa Ferrari.

In the second practice session, Montoya in the No. 6 Acura was fastest with a time of 1 minute, 16.003 seconds, 0.078 seconds faster than Felipe Nasr in the No. 31 Cadillac. Jarvis was the best of the Mazdas in third and João Barbosa's No. 5 Cadillac was fourth. Kyle Masson led LMP2 in the Performance Tech Motorsports car. The GTLM class was topped by Antonio García's No. 3 Corvette with a lap of 1 minute, 22.833 seconds, 0.130 seconds faster than his teammate Oliver Gavin. Patrick Pilet was third in the No. 911 Porsche and Dirk Müller's No. 66 Ford GT was fourth. In GTD, Seller's No. 48 lapped fastest with a time of 1 minute, 25.246 seconds, with Matt Plumb second in the No. 76 McLaren.

In the final practice session, Ricky Taylor set the fastest time of the weekend so far at 1 minute, 15.497 seconds in the No. 7 Acura, 0.360 seconds faster than the second quickest car of teammate Montoya. van der Zande was third in the No. 10 Cadillac and Jarvis in the No. 77 Mazda was fourth. Hélio Castroneves necessitated the showing of a red flag when he spun and beached the No. 7 Acura in the gravel trap at the Corkscrew halfway through the session. Masson was the fastest LMP2 driver in the No. 38 Performance Tech Motorsports car. Westbrook's No. 67 Ford GT was fastest in GTLM while, Robby Foley, driving the No. 96 Turner Motorsport BMW M6, was the fastest driver in GTD.

== Qualifying ==
Saturday's afternoon qualifying session was broken into three sessions that were scheduled for 15 minutes each. Cars in GTD were sent out first before those grouped in GTLM and DPi/LMP2 had two separate identically timed sessions. All cars were required to be driven by one participant and the starting order was determined by the competitor's fastest lap. IMSA then arranged the grid so that the DPi, LMP2, and GTLM cars started in front of the GTD field.

Ricky Taylor in the No. 7 Acura set a new track record to clinch his first pole position of the season with a time of 1 minute and 15.035 seconds. He was joined on the grid's front row by his teammate Montoya who was 0.308 seconds slower. Jordan Taylor qualified the No. 10 Cadillac in third position. The duo of Mazda Team Joest Mazda RT24-Ps were fourth and sixth: Tristan Nunez in the No. 77 car was faster than the sister No. 55 entry of Jonathan Bomarito. They were separated by fifth-placed Felipe Nasr in the No. 31 Cadillac. Albuquerque's No. 5 Cadillac took seventh and Misha Goikhberg's No. 85 Cadillac qualified eighth. The No. 84 JDC-Miller MotorSports Cadillac DPi-V.R of Simon Trummer and Jon Bennett in the CORE Autosport Nissan rounded out the DPi qualifiers. In LMP2, Kyle Masson set the fastest time in the Performance Tech Motorsports entry, but the car would be dropped to the rear of the LMP2 field because the team changed their starting driver. As a result, Matt McMurry was promoted to first and would start the race from pole position.

In GTLM, Jesse Krohn in the No. 24 BMW clinched his second pole position of the season, with his fastest lap being 0.127 seconds faster than Dirk Müller in the No. 66 Ford GT. Tom Blomqvist qualified the No. 25 BMW in third position. Vanthoor's No. 912 Porsche took fourth and Ryan Briscoe's No. 67 Ford GT qualified fifth. The two Corvette Racing cars and the No. 911 Porsche GT Team Porsche 911 RSR rounded out the GTLM field.

In GTD, Corey Lewis in the No. 48 Lamborghini was fastest on the car's final timed lap with a time of 1 minute and 24.962 seconds to clinch pole position. He was joined by Trent Hindman's No. 86 Acura on the grid's front row with his best lap being 0.101 seconds slower, and Cooper MacNeil drove the No. 63 Scuderia Corsa Ferrari to third place. Zacharie Robichon qualified the No. 9 Porsche fourth, ahead of Robby Foley's fifth place BMW. The session was extended when Patrick Lindsey, driving the No. 73 Park Place Motorsports Porsche, crashed heavily at turn ten. Lindsey walked away from the incident unhurt. Lindsey had his best two laps from the session deleted for causing a red flag, effectively leaving him with no time set. Due to the extensive damage on their car, Park Place Motorsports withdrew from the event.

=== Qualifying results ===
Pole positions in each class are indicated in bold and by ‡.

Pos.	Class	No.	Team	Driver	Time	Gap	Grid
1	**DPi**	**7**	**(United States) Acura Team Penske**	**(United States) Ricky Taylor**	**1:15.035**	**_**	1‡
2	DPi	6	(United States) Acura Team Penske	(Colombia) Juan Pablo Montoya	1:15.343	+0.308	2
3	DPi	10	(United States) Konica Minolta Cadillac	(United States) Jordan Taylor	1:15.488	+0.453	3
4	DPi	77	(Germany) Mazda Team Joest	(United States) Tristan Nunez	1:15.517	+0.482	4
5	DPi	31	(United States) Whelen Engineering Racing	(Brazil) Felipe Nasr	1:15.610	+0.575	5
6	DPi	55	(Germany) Mazda Team Joest	(United States) Jonathan Bomarito	1:15.728	+0.693	6
7	DPi	5	(United States) Mustang Sampling Racing	(Portugal) Filipe Albuquerque	1:15.757	+0.722	7
8	DPi	85	(United States) JDC-Miller MotorSports	(Canada) Misha Goikhberg	1:16.176	+1.141	8
9	DPi	84	(United States) JDC-Miller MotorSports	(Switzerland) Simon Trummer	1:16.348	+1.313	10^{1}
10	LMP2	38	(United States) Performance Tech Motorsports	(United States) Kyle Masson	1:16.817	+1.782	12^{2}
11	**LMP2**	**52**	**(United States) PR1/ Mathiasen Motorsports**	**(United States) Matt McMurry**	**1:17.618**	**+2.583**	11‡
12	DPi	54	(United States) CORE Autosport	(United States) Jon Bennett	1:17.661	+2.626	9
13	**GTLM**	**24**	**(United States) BMW Team RLL**	**(Finland) Jesse Krohn**	**1:21.557**	**+6.522**	13‡
14	GTLM	66	(United States) Ford Chip Ganassi Racing	(Germany) Dirk Müller	1:21.684	+6.649	14
15	GTLM	25	(United States) BMW Team RLL	(United Kingdom) Tom Blomqvist	1:21.891	+6.856	15
16	GTLM	912	(United States) Porsche GT Team	(Belgium) Laurens Vanthoor	1:21.942	+6.907	16
17	GTLM	67	(United States) Ford Chip Ganassi Racing	(Australia) Ryan Briscoe	1:21.999	+6.964	17
18	GTLM	3	(United States) Corvette Racing	(Denmark) Jan Magnussen	1:22.026	+6.991	18
19	GTLM	4	(United States) Corvette Racing	(United Kingdom) Oliver Gavin	1:22.161	+7.126	19
20	GTLM	911	(United States) Porsche GT Team	(United Kingdom) Nick Tandy	1:22.295	+7.260	20
21	**GTD**	**48**	**(United States) Paul Miller Racing**	**(United States) Corey Lewis**	**1:24.962**	**+9.927**	21‡
22	GTD	86	(United States) Meyer Shank Racing with Curb-Agajanian	(United States) Trent Hindman	1:25.063	+10.028	22
23	GTD	63	(United States) Scuderia Corsa	(United States) Cooper MacNeil	1:25.118	+10.083	23
24	GTD	9	(Canada) Pfaff Motorsports	(Canada) Zacharie Robichon	1:25.165	+10.130	24
25	GTD	96	(United States) Turner Motorsport	(United States) Robby Foley	1:25.165	+10.130	25
26	GTD	76	(Canada) Compass Racing	(United States) Matt Plumb	1:25.204	+10.169	26
27	GTD	57	(United States) Heinricher Racing w/Meyer Shank Racing	(Denmark) Christina Nielsen	1:25.311	+10.276	27
28	GTD	33	(United States) Mercedes-AMG Team Riley Motorsports	(United States) Ben Keating	1:25.678	+10.643	28
29	GTD	14	(Canada) AIM Vasser Sullivan	(United States) Richard Heistand	1:26.180	+11.145	29
30	GTD	44	(United States) Magnus Racing	(United States) John Potter	1:26.414	+11.379	30^{3}
31	GTD	12	(Canada) AIM Vasser Sullivan	(United States) Frankie Montecalvo	1:26.466	+11.431	31^{4}
32	GTD	73	(United States) Park Place Motorsports	(United States) Patrick Lindsey	no time^{5}	–	32
Sources:

- ^{1} The No. 84 JDC-Miller MotorSports entry was moved to the back of the DPi field after the team elected to change tires after qualifying.
- ^{2} The No. 38 Performance Tech Motorsports entry was moved to the back of the LMP2 field for starting the race with a different driver than who qualified.
- ^{3} The No. 44 Magnus Racing entry was moved to the back of the GTD field after the team elected to change tires after qualifying.
- ^{4} The No. 12 AIM Vasser Sullivan entry was moved to the back of the GTD field after the team elected to change tires after qualifying.
- ^{5} The No. 73 Park Place Motorsports entry had its two fastest laps deleted as penalty for causing a red flag during its qualifying session.

== Race ==
=== Post-race ===
With a total of 274 points, Cameron and Montoya's victory allowed them to increase their advantage over Derani and Nasr to 12 points in the DPi Drivers' Championship. McMurry's victory allowed him to increase his advantage to eighth points over Cassels in the LMP2 Drivers' Championship. Kellett jumped to fifth after being eighth coming into WeatherTech Raceway Laguna Seca. The final results of GTLM kept Bamber and Vanthoor atop the Drivers' Championship with 304 points while Müller advanced from fifth to fourth. The final results of GTD kept Farnbacher and Hindman atop the Divers' Championship with 264 points while Lally and Potter jumped to fourth. MacNeil and Vilander's strong result allowed the duo to move into fifth. Acura and Porsche continued to top their respective Manufacturers' Championships, while Lamborghini took the lead of GTD Manufactures' Championship. Acura Team Penske, PR1/Mathiasen Motorsports, Porsche GT Team, and Meyer Shank Racing kept their respective advantages in their Teams' Championships with one round left in the season.

=== Race results ===
Class winners are denoted in bold and ‡.

Pos	Class	No	Team	Drivers	Chassis	Laps	Time/Retired
Pos	Class	No	Team	Drivers	Engine	Laps	Time/Retired
1	**DPi**	**6**	**(United States) Acura Team Penske**	**(United States) Dane Cameron (Colombia) Juan Pablo Montoya**	**Acura ARX-05**	**121**	**2:41:11.681‡**
1	**DPi**	**6**	**(United States) Acura Team Penske**	**(United States) Dane Cameron (Colombia) Juan Pablo Montoya**	**Acura AR35TT 3.5 L Turbo V6**	**121**	**2:41:11.681‡**
2	DPi	7	(United States) Acura Team Penske	(Brazil) Hélio Castroneves (United States) Ricky Taylor	Acura ARX-05	121	+9.784
2	DPi	7	(United States) Acura Team Penske	(Brazil) Hélio Castroneves (United States) Ricky Taylor	Acura AR35TT 3.5 L Turbo V6	121	+9.784
3	DPi	31	(United States) Whelen Engineering Racing	(Brazil) Hélio Castroneves (United States) Ricky Taylor	Acura ARX-05	121	+19.131
3	DPi	31	(United States) Whelen Engineering Racing	(Brazil) Hélio Castroneves (United States) Ricky Taylor	Cadillac 5.5 L V8	121	+19.131
4	DPi	10	(United States) Konica Minolta Cadillac	(United States) Jordan Taylor (Netherlands) Renger van der Zande	Cadillac DPi-V.R	121	+20.122
4	DPi	10	(United States) Konica Minolta Cadillac	(United States) Jordan Taylor (Netherlands) Renger van der Zande	Cadillac 5.5 L V8	121	+20.122
5	DPi	5	(United States) Mustang Sampling Racing	(Portugal) Filipe Albuquerque (Portugal) João Barbosa	Cadillac DPi-V.R	121	+23.543
5	DPi	5	(United States) Mustang Sampling Racing	(Portugal) Filipe Albuquerque (Portugal) João Barbosa	Cadillac 5.5 L V8	121	+23.543
6	DPi	77	(Germany) Mazda Team Joest	(United Kingdom) Oliver Jarvis (United States) Tristan Nunez	Mazda RT24-P	121	+24.349
6	DPi	77	(Germany) Mazda Team Joest	(United Kingdom) Oliver Jarvis (United States) Tristan Nunez	Mazda MZ-2.0T 2.0 L Turbo I4	121	+24.349
7	DPi	54	(United States) CORE Autosport	(United States) Jon Bennett (United States) Colin Braun	Ligier Nissan DPi	120	+1 Lap
7	DPi	54	(United States) CORE Autosport	(United States) Jon Bennett (United States) Colin Braun	Nissan VR38DETT 3.8 L Turbo V6	120	+1 Lap
8	DPi	85	(United States) JDC-Miller MotorSports	(Canada) Misha Goikhberg (France) Tristan Vautier	Cadillac DPi-V.R	119	+2 Laps
8	DPi	85	(United States) JDC-Miller MotorSports	(Canada) Misha Goikhberg (France) Tristan Vautier	Cadillac 5.5 L V8	119	+2 Laps
9	DPi	84	(United States) JDC-Miller MotorSports	(South Africa) Stephen Simpson (Switzerland) Simon Trummer	Cadillac DPi-V.R	119	+2 Laps
9	DPi	84	(United States) JDC-Miller MotorSports	(South Africa) Stephen Simpson (Switzerland) Simon Trummer	Cadillac 5.5 L V8	119	+2 Laps
10	**LMP2**	**52**	**(United States) PR1/ Mathiasen Motorsports**	**(Canada) Dalton Kellett (United States) Matt McMurry**	**Oreca 07**	**117**	**+4 Laps‡**
10	**LMP2**	**52**	**(United States) PR1/ Mathiasen Motorsports**	**(Canada) Dalton Kellett (United States) Matt McMurry**	**Gibson GK428 4.2 L V8**	**117**	**+4 Laps‡**
11	LMP2	38	(United States) Performance Tech Motorsports	(Canada) Cameron Cassels (United States) Kyle Masson	Oreca 07	116	+5 Laps
11	LMP2	38	(United States) Performance Tech Motorsports	(Canada) Cameron Cassels (United States) Kyle Masson	Gibson GK428 4.2 L V8	116	+5 Laps
12	**GTLM**	**66**	**(United States) Ford Chip Ganassi Racing**	**(United States) Joey Hand (Germany) Dirk Müller**	**Ford GT**	**114**	**+7 Laps‡**
12	**GTLM**	**66**	**(United States) Ford Chip Ganassi Racing**	**(United States) Joey Hand (Germany) Dirk Müller**	**Ford EcoBoost 3.5 L Turbo V6**	**114**	**+7 Laps‡**
13	GTLM	24	(United States) BMW Team RLL	(United States) John Edwards (Finland) Jesse Krohn	BMW M8 GTE	114	+7 Laps
13	GTLM	24	(United States) BMW Team RLL	(United States) John Edwards (Finland) Jesse Krohn	BMW S63 4.0 L Turbo V8	114	+7 Laps
14	GTLM	3	(United States) Corvette Racing	(Spain) Antonio García (Denmark) Jan Magnussen	Chevrolet Corvette C7.R	114	+7 Laps
14	GTLM	3	(United States) Corvette Racing	(Spain) Antonio García (Denmark) Jan Magnussen	Chevrolet LT5.5 5.5 L V8	114	+7 Laps
15	GTLM	4	(United States) Corvette Racing	(United Kingdom) Oliver Gavin (United States) Tommy Milner	Chevrolet Corvette C7.R	114	+7 Laps
15	GTLM	4	(United States) Corvette Racing	(United Kingdom) Oliver Gavin (United States) Tommy Milner	Chevrolet LT5.5 5.5 L V8	114	+7 Laps
16	GTLM	25	(United States) BMW Team RLL	(United Kingdom) Tom Blomqvist (United States) Connor De Phillippi	BMW M8 GTE	114	+7 Laps
16	GTLM	25	(United States) BMW Team RLL	(United Kingdom) Tom Blomqvist (United States) Connor De Phillippi	BMW S63 4.0 L Turbo V8	114	+7 Laps
17	GTLM	67	(United States) Ford Chip Ganassi Racing	(Australia) Ryan Briscoe (United Kingdom) Richard Westbrook	Ford GT	114	+7 Laps
17	GTLM	67	(United States) Ford Chip Ganassi Racing	(Australia) Ryan Briscoe (United Kingdom) Richard Westbrook	Ford EcoBoost 3.5 L Turbo V6	114	+7 Laps
18	GTLM	912	(United States) Porsche GT Team	(New Zealand) Earl Bamber (Belgium) Laurens Vanthoor	Porsche 911 RSR	113	+8 Laps
18	GTLM	912	(United States) Porsche GT Team	(New Zealand) Earl Bamber (Belgium) Laurens Vanthoor	Porsche 4.0 L Flat-6	113	+8 Laps
19	GTLM	911	(United States) Porsche GT Team	(France) Patrick Pilet (United Kingdom) Nick Tandy	Porsche 911 RSR	113	+8 Laps
19	GTLM	911	(United States) Porsche GT Team	(France) Patrick Pilet (United Kingdom) Nick Tandy	Porsche 4.0 L Flat-6	113	+8 Laps
20	**GTD**	**48**	**(United States) Paul Miller Racing**	**(United States) Corey Lewis (United States) Bryan Sellers**	**Lamborghini Huracán GT3 Evo**	**110**	**+11 Laps‡**
20	**GTD**	**48**	**(United States) Paul Miller Racing**	**(United States) Corey Lewis (United States) Bryan Sellers**	**Lamborghini 5.2 L V10**	**110**	**+11 Laps‡**
21	GTD	63	(United States) Scuderia Corsa	(United States) Cooper MacNeil (Finland) Toni Vilander	Ferrari 488 GT3	110	+11 Laps
21	GTD	63	(United States) Scuderia Corsa	(United States) Cooper MacNeil (Finland) Toni Vilander	Ferrari F154 3.9 L Turbo V8	110	+11 Laps
22	GTD	44	(United States) Magnus Racing	(United States) Andy Lally (United States) John Potter	Lamborghini Huracán GT3 Evo	109	+12 Laps
22	GTD	44	(United States) Magnus Racing	(United States) Andy Lally (United States) John Potter	Lamborghini 5.2 L V10	109	+12 Laps
23	GTD	9	(Canada) Pfaff Motorsports	(Canada) Scott Hargrove (Canada) Zacharie Robichon	Porsche 911 GT3 R	109	+12 Laps
23	GTD	9	(Canada) Pfaff Motorsports	(Canada) Scott Hargrove (Canada) Zacharie Robichon	Porsche 4.0 L Flat-6	109	+12 Laps
24	GTD	33	(United States) Mercedes-AMG Team Riley Motorsports	(Netherlands) Jeroen Bleekemolen (United States) Ben Keating	Mercedes-AMG GT3	109	+12 Laps
24	GTD	33	(United States) Mercedes-AMG Team Riley Motorsports	(Netherlands) Jeroen Bleekemolen (United States) Ben Keating	Mercedes-AMG M159 6.2 L V8	109	+12 Laps
25	GTD	57	(United States) Heinricher Racing w/ Meyer Shank Racing	(Denmark) Christina Nielsen (United Kingdom) Katherine Legge	Acura NSX GT3 Evo	109	+12 Laps
25	GTD	57	(United States) Heinricher Racing w/ Meyer Shank Racing	(Denmark) Christina Nielsen (United Kingdom) Katherine Legge	Acura 3.5 L Turbo V6	109	+12 Laps
26	GTD	96	(United States) Turner Motorsport	(United States) Bill Auberlen (United States) Robby Foley	BMW M6 GT3	109	+12 Laps
26	GTD	96	(United States) Turner Motorsport	(United States) Bill Auberlen (United States) Robby Foley	BMW 4.4 L Turbo V8	109	+12 Laps
27	GTD	86	(United States) Meyer Shank Racing w/ Curb-Agajanian	(Germany) Mario Farnbacher (United States) Trent Hindman	Acura NSX GT3 Evo	108	+13 Laps
27	GTD	86	(United States) Meyer Shank Racing w/ Curb-Agajanian	(Germany) Mario Farnbacher (United States) Trent Hindman	Acura 3.5 L Turbo V6	108	+13 Laps
28	GTD	14	(Canada) AIM Vasser Sullivan	(United Kingdom) Jack Hawksworth (United States) Richard Heistand	Lexus RC F GT3	108	+13 Laps
28	GTD	14	(Canada) AIM Vasser Sullivan	(United Kingdom) Jack Hawksworth (United States) Richard Heistand	Lexus 5.0 L V8	108	+13 Laps
29	GTD	76	(Canada) Compass Racing	(United States) Paul Holton (United States) Matt Plumb	McLaren 720S GT3	108	+13 Laps
29	GTD	76	(Canada) Compass Racing	(United States) Paul Holton (United States) Matt Plumb	McLaren M840T 4.0 L Turbo V8	108	+13 Laps
30	GTD	12	(Canada) AIM Vasser Sullivan	(United States) Townsend Bell (United States) Frankie Montecalvo	Lexus RC F GT3	106	+15 Laps
30	GTD	12	(Canada) AIM Vasser Sullivan	(United States) Townsend Bell (United States) Frankie Montecalvo	Lexus 5.0 L V8	106	+15 Laps
31 DNF	DPi	55	(Germany) Mazda Team Joest	(United States) Jonathan Bomarito (United Kingdom) Harry Tincknell	Mazda RT24-P	87	Gearbox
31 DNF	DPi	55	(Germany) Mazda Team Joest	(United States) Jonathan Bomarito (United Kingdom) Harry Tincknell	Mazda MZ-2.0T 2.0 L Turbo I4	87	Gearbox
32 DNS	GTD	73	(United States) Park Place Motorsports	(United States) Patrick Long (United States) Patrick Lindsey	Porsche 911 GT3 R	Did Not Start	
32 DNS	GTD	73	(United States) Park Place Motorsports	(United States) Patrick Long (United States) Patrick Lindsey	Porsche 4.0 L Flat-6	Did Not Start	

== Standings after the race ==
DPi Drivers' Championship standings
Pos.	+/–	Driver	Points
1		(United States) Dane Cameron (Colombia) Juan Pablo Montoya	274
2		(Brazil) Pipo Derani (Brazil) Felipe Nasr	262
3	1	(Brazil) Hélio Castroneves (United States) Ricky Taylor	254
4	1	(United States) Jonathan Bomarito	243
5		(United Kingdom) Oliver Jarvis (United States) Tristan Nunez	243

LMP2 Drivers' Championship standings
Pos.	+/–	Driver	Points
1		(United States) Matt McMurry	235
2		(Canada) Cameron Cassels	227
3	1	(United States) Kyle Masson	163
4		(France) Gabriel Aubry	95
5	3	(Canada) Dalton Kellett	70

GTLM Drivers' Championship standings
Pos.	+/–	Driver	Points
1		(New Zealand) Earl Bamber (Belgium) Laurens Vanthoor	304
2		(France) Patrick Pilet (United Kingdom) Nick Tandy	292
3		(Spain) Antonio García (Denmark) Jan Magnussen	289
4	1	(Germany) Dirk Müller	283
5	1	(Australia) Ryan Briscoe (United Kingdom) Richard Westbrook	281

GTD Drivers' Championship standings
Pos.	+/–	Driver	Points
1		(Germany) Mario Farnbacher (United States) Trent Hindman	264
2		(Canada) Zacharie Robichon	232
3		(United States) Bill Auberlen (United States) Robby Foley	227
4	1	(United States) Andy Lally (United States) John Potter	226
5	3	(Finland) Toni Vilander (United States) Cooper MacNeil	220

- Note: Only the top five positions are included for all sets of standings.

DPi Teams' Championship standings
Pos.	+/–	Team	Points
1		(United States) #6 Acura Team Penske	274
2		(United States) #31 Whelen Engineering Racing	262
3	1	(United States) #7 Acura Team Penske	254
4	1	(Germany) #55 Mazda Team Joest	243
5		(Germany) #77 Mazda Team Joest	243

LMP2 Teams' Championship standings
Pos.	+/–	Team	Points
1		(United States) #52 PR1/Mathiasen Motorsports	235
2		(United States) #38 Performance Tech Motorsports	227
3		(United States) #18 DragonSpeed	35
4		(United States) #81 DragonSpeed	30

GTLM Teams' Championship standings
Pos.	+/–	Team	Points
1		(United States) #912 Porsche GT Team	304
2		(United States) #911 Porsche GT Team	292
3		(United States) #3 Corvette Racing	289
4	1	(United States) #66 Ford Chip Ganassi Racing	283
5	1	(United States) #67 Ford Chip Ganassi Racing	281

GTD Teams' Championship standings
Pos.	+/–	Team	Points
1		(United States) #86 Meyer-Shank Racing with Curb Agajanian	264
2		(Canada) #9 Pfaff Motorsports	232
3		(United States) #96 Turner Motorsport	227
4	1	(United States) #44 Magnus Racing	226
5	3	(United States) #63 Scuderia Corsa	220

- Note: Only the top five positions are included for all sets of standings.

DPi Manufacturers' Championship standings
Pos.	+/–	Manufacturer	Points
1		(Japan) Acura	297
2		(United States) Cadillac	289
3		(Japan) Mazda	281
4		(Japan) Nissan	258

GTLM Manufacturers' Championship standings
Pos.	+/–	Manufacturer	Points
1		(Germany) Porsche	332
2		(United States) Ford	313
3		(United States) Chevrolet	303
4		(Germany) BMW	297
5		(Italy) Ferrari	32

GTD Manufacturers' Championship standings
Pos.	+/–	Manufacturer	Points
1	1	(Italy) Lamborghini	269
2	1	(Japan) Acura	268
3		(Germany) Porsche	261
4		(Japan) Lexus	254
5	1	(Italy) Ferrari	245

- Note: Only the top five positions are included for all sets of standings.

IMSA SportsCar Championship
Previous race: Oak Tree Grand Prix	2019 season	Next race: Petit Le Mans
