= 2022 Chevrolet Detroit Grand Prix (IMSA) =

Sports car race in Michigan

The layout of The Raceway on Belle Isle

The 2022 Chevrolet Detroit Grand Prix (formally known as the Chevrolet Detroit Grand Prix presented by Lear) was a sports car race held at The Raceway on Belle Isle in Detroit, Michigan on June 4, 2022. It was the sixth round of the 2022 IMSA SportsCar Championship and the fourth round of the 2022 WeatherTech Sprint Cup. Chip Ganassi Racing's No. 01 piloted by Sebastien Bourdais and Renger van der Zande earned the victory in DPi, while the VasserSullivan No. 17 Lexus RC F GT3 driven by Ben Barnicoat and Kyle Kirkwood won in the GTD class.

== Background ==
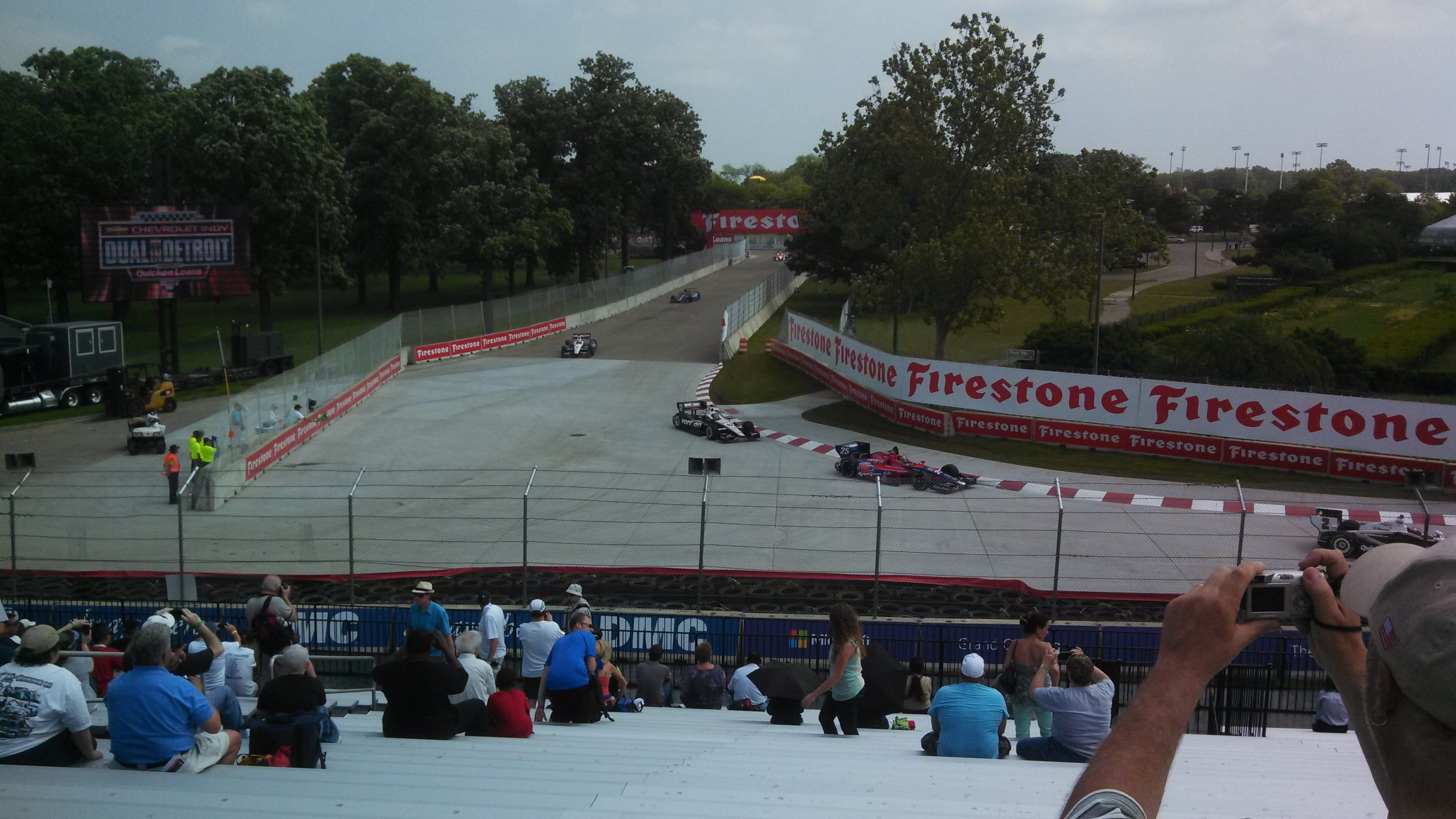
The Raceway on Belle Isle, where the race was held.

International Motor Sports Association's (IMSA) president John Doonan confirmed the race was part of the schedule for the 2022 IMSA SportsCar Championship (IMSA SCC) in August 2021. It was the eighth year the event was held as part of the WeatherTech SportsCar Championship, and the twelfth annual running of the race, counting the period between 2007 and 2013 when it was a round of the Rolex Sports Car Series and the American Le Mans Series respectively. The 2022 Chevrolet Detroit Grand Prix was the sixth of twelve scheduled sports car races of 2022 by IMSA, and it was the fourth of eight rounds held as part of the WeatherTech Sprint Cup. The race was held at the fourteen-turn 2.350 mi (3.782 km) Belle Isle Park in Detroit, Michigan on June 4, 2022.

On May 26, 2022, IMSA released the latest technical bulletin outlining Balance of Performance for the DPi and GTD classes. In DPi, the Cadillac DPi-V.R received a 15 kilogram weight increase. In GTD, the BMW M4 GT3 received a 10 kilogram weight increase.

Before the race, Filipe Albuquerque and Ricky Taylor led the DPi Drivers' Championship with 1707 points, 32 clear of Tom Blomqvist and Oliver Jarvis followed by Alex Lynn and Earl Bamber in third with 1603 points. With 1237 points, Stevan McAleer led the GTD Drivers' Championship, 12 points ahead of Ryan Hardwick and Jan Heylen in second followed by Bill Auberlen and Robby Foley in third with 1161 points. Acura and Mercedes-AMG were leading their respective Manufactures' Championships while Wayne Taylor Racing and Gilbert Korthoff Motorsports each led their own Teams' Championships.

=== Entries ===
A total of 16 cars took part in the event, split across two classes. 6 were entered in DPi and 10 in GTD. In DPi, Oliver Pla replaced Tristan Nunez in the Whelen Engineering Racing entry. In GTD, Inception Racing were absent due to a clash with the GT World Challenge Europe at Circuit Paul Ricard. Ben Barnicoat subbed for Jack Hawksworth, who was injured, in the Vasser Sullivan Racing No. 17. Ross Gunn subbed for Maxime Martin in the Heart of Racing team No. 27.

== Practice ==
There were two practice sessions preceding the start of the race on Saturday, both on Friday. The first session lasted 90 minutes on Friday morning while the second session lasted for 120 minutes on Friday afternoon.

== Qualifying ==
Friday's afternoon qualifying was broken into two sessions, with one session for the DPi and GTD classes, which lasted for 15 minutes each, and a ten-minute interval between the sessions. The rules dictated that all teams nominated a driver to qualify their cars, with the Pro-Am (GTD) class requiring a Bronze/Silver Rated Driver to qualify the car. The competitors' fastest lap times determined the starting order. IMSA then arranged the grid to put DPis ahead of the GTD cars.

=== Qualifying results ===
Pole positions in each class are indicated in bold and by ‡.

| Pos. | Class | PIC | No. | Team | Driver | Time | Gap | Grid |
|---|---|---|---|---|---|---|---|---|
| 1 | **DPi** | **1** | **01** | **(United States) Cadillac Racing** | **(France) Sébastien Bourdais** | **1:18.818** | - | 1‡ |
| 2 | DPi | 2 | 60 | (United States) Meyer Shank Racing with Curb-Agajanian | (United Kingdom) Tom Blomqvist | 1:18.928 | +0.110 | 2 |
| 3 | DPi | 3 | 10 | (United States) WTR - Konica Minolta Acura | (United States) Ricky Taylor | 1:18.945 | +0.127 | 3 |
| 4 | DPi | 4 | 02 | (United States) Cadillac Racing | (United Kingdom) Alex Lynn | 1:19.334 | +0.516 | 4 |
| 5 | DPi | 5 | 31 | (United States) Whelen Engineering Racing | (France) Olivier Pla | 1:20.298 | +1.480 | 5 |
| 6 | DPi | 6 | 5 | (United States) JDC-Miller MotorSports | (France) Tristan Vautier | 1:20.331 | +1.513 | 6 |
| 7 | **GTD** | **1** | **17** | **(United States) Vasser Sullivan Racing** | **(United States) Kyle Kirkwood** | **1:29.096** | **+10.278** | 7‡ |
| 8 | GTD | 2 | 27 | (United States) Heart of Racing Team | (Canada) Roman De Angelis | 1:29.214 | +10.396 | 8 |
| 9 | GTD | 3 | 1 | (United States) Paul Miller Racing | (United States) Madison Snow | 1:29.286 | +10.468 | 9 |
| 10 | GTD | 4 | 12 | (United States) Vasser Sullivan Racing | (United States) Frankie Montecalvo | 1:29.299 | +10.481 | 10 |
| 11 | GTD | 5 | 51 | (Philippines) RWR Eurasia Motorsport | (Australia) Aidan Read | 1:29.544 | +10.726 | 11 |
| 12 | GTD | 6 | 39 | (United States) CarBahn with Peregrine Racing | (United States) Robert Megennis | 1:29.781 | +10.963 | 12 |
| 13 | GTD | 7 | 57 | (United States) Winward Racing | (United States) Russell Ward | 1:29.810 | +10.992 | 13 |
| 14 | GTD | 8 | 32 | (United States) Team Korthoff Motorsports | (United Kingdom) Stevan McAleer | 1:29.858 | +11.040 | 14 |
| 15 | GTD | 9 | 96 | (United States) Turner Motorsport | (United States) Robby Foley | 1:30.201 | +11.383 | 16^{1} |
| 16 | GTD | 10 | 16 | (United States) Wright Motorsports | (United States) Ryan Hardwick | 1:30.903 | +12.085 | 15 |
Sources:

- ^{1} The No. 96 Turner Motorsport entry was moved to the back of the GTD field as per Article 40.1.4 of the Sporting regulations (Change of starting tires).

== Race ==
=== Post-Race ===
Blomqvist and Jarvis retook the DPi Drivers' Championship lead with 2027 points while Albuquerque and Taylor dropped to second with 2017 points. Bourdais and van der Zande advanced from sixth to fourth. The final results of GTD meant McAleer increased his gap to Hardwick and Heylen to 34 points. Montecalvo advanced from fifth to fourth while De Angelis jumped from ninth to fifth. Cadillac and BMW assumed the lead of their respective Manufacturers' Championships while Gilbert Korthoff Motorsports continued to top the GTD Teams' Championship. Meyer Shank Racing took the lead of the DPi Teams' Championship with six rounds remaining.

=== Race results ===
Class winners are denoted in bold and ‡.

| Pos | Class | PIC | No. | Team | Drivers | Chassis | Laps | Time/Retired |
| Pos | Class | PIC | No. | Team | Drivers | Engine | Laps | Time/Retired |
|---|---|---|---|---|---|---|---|---|
| 1 | **DPi** | **1** | **01** | **(United States) Cadillac Racing** | **(France) Sebastien Bourdais (Netherlands) Renger van der Zande** | **Cadillac DPi-V.R** | **73** | **1:40:45.972‡** |
| 1 | **DPi** | **1** | **01** | **(United States) Cadillac Racing** | **(France) Sebastien Bourdais (Netherlands) Renger van der Zande** | **Cadillac 5.5 L V8** | **73** | **1:40:45.972‡** |
| 2 | DPi | 2 | 60 | (United States) Meyer Shank Racing with Curb-Agajanian | (United Kingdom) Tom Blomqvist (United Kingdom) Oliver Jarvis | Acura ARX-05 | 73 | +0.398 |
| 2 | DPi | 2 | 60 | (United States) Meyer Shank Racing with Curb-Agajanian | (United Kingdom) Tom Blomqvist (United Kingdom) Oliver Jarvis | Acura AR35TT 3.5 L Turbo V6 | 73 | +0.398 |
| 3 | DPi | 3 | 02 | (United States) Chip Ganassi Racing | (United Kingdom) Alex Lynn (New Zealand) Earl Bamber | Cadillac DPi-V.R | 73 | +0.783 |
| 3 | DPi | 3 | 02 | (United States) Chip Ganassi Racing | (United Kingdom) Alex Lynn (New Zealand) Earl Bamber | Cadillac 5.5 L V8 | 73 | +0.783 |
| 4 | DPi | 4 | 10 | (United States) WTR - Konica Minolta Acura | (United States) Ricky Taylor (Portugal) Filipe Albuquerque | Acura ARX-05 | 73 | +15.942 |
| 4 | DPi | 4 | 10 | (United States) WTR - Konica Minolta Acura | (United States) Ricky Taylor (Portugal) Filipe Albuquerque | Acura AR35TT 3.5 L Turbo V6 | 73 | +15.942 |
| 5 | DPi | 5 | 5 | (United States) JDC-Miller MotorSports | (France) Tristan Vautier (United Kingdom) Richard Westbrook | Cadillac DPi-V.R | 73 | +44.888 |
| 5 | DPi | 5 | 5 | (United States) JDC-Miller MotorSports | (France) Tristan Vautier (United Kingdom) Richard Westbrook | Cadillac 5.5 L V8 | 73 | +44.888 |
| 6 | DPi | 6 | 31 | (United States) Whelen Engineering Racing | (France) Olivier Pla (Brazil) Pipo Derani | Cadillac DPi-V.R | 73 | +1.663 (Note: The No. 31 Cadillac DPi-V.R was moved to the back of the DPi class after post-race technical inspection showed that the car was below the minimum weight required.) |
| 6 | DPi | 6 | 31 | (United States) Whelen Engineering Racing | (France) Olivier Pla (Brazil) Pipo Derani | Cadillac 5.5 L V8 | 73 | +1.663 |
| 7 | **GTD** | **1** | **17** | **(United States) VasserSullivan** | **(United States) Kyle Kirkwood (United Kingdom) Ben Barnicoat** | **Lexus RC F GT3** | **67** | **+6 Laps‡** |
| 7 | **GTD** | **1** | **17** | **(United States) VasserSullivan** | **(United States) Kyle Kirkwood (United Kingdom) Ben Barnicoat** | **Toyota 2UR 5.0 L V8** | **67** | **+6 Laps‡** |
| 8 | GTD | 2 | 27 | (United States) Heart of Racing Team | (Canada) Roman De Angelis (United Kingdom) Ross Gunn | Aston Martin Vantage AMR GT3 | 67 | +6 Laps |
| 8 | GTD | 2 | 27 | (United States) Heart of Racing Team | (Canada) Roman De Angelis (United Kingdom) Ross Gunn | Aston Martin 4.0 L Turbo V8 | 67 | +6 Laps |
| 9 | GTD | 3 | 1 | (United States) Paul Miller Racing | (United States) Madison Snow (United States) Bryan Sellers | BMW M4 GT3 | 67 | +6 Laps |
| 9 | GTD | 3 | 1 | (United States) Paul Miller Racing | (United States) Madison Snow (United States) Bryan Sellers | BMW S58B30T0 3.0 L Twin Turbo I6 | 67 | +6 Laps |
| 10 | GTD | 4 | 12 | (United States) VasserSullivan | (United States) Frankie Montecalvo (United States) Aaron Telitz | Lexus RC F GT3 | 67 | +6 Laps |
| 10 | GTD | 4 | 12 | (United States) VasserSullivan | (United States) Frankie Montecalvo (United States) Aaron Telitz | Toyota 2UR 5.0 L V8 | 67 | +6 Laps |
| 11 | GTD | 5 | 32 | (United States) Team Korthoff Motorsports | (United Kingdom) Stevan McAleer (United States) Mike Skeen | Mercedes-AMG GT3 Evo | 67 | +6 laps |
| 11 | GTD | 5 | 32 | (United States) Team Korthoff Motorsports | (United Kingdom) Stevan McAleer (United States) Mike Skeen | Mercedes-AMG M159 6.2 L V8 | 67 | +6 laps |
| 12 | GTD | 6 | 39 | (United States) CarBahn With Peregrine Racing | (United States) Robert Megennis (United States) Jeff Westphal | Lamborghini Huracán GT3 Evo | 67 | +6 Laps |
| 12 | GTD | 6 | 39 | (United States) CarBahn With Peregrine Racing | (United States) Robert Megennis (United States) Jeff Westphal | Lamborghini 5.2 L V10 | 67 | +6 Laps |
| 13 | GTD | 7 | 16 | (United States) Wright Motorsports | (United States) Ryan Hardwick (Belgium) Jan Heylen | Porsche 911 GT3 R | 66 | +7 Laps |
| 13 | GTD | 7 | 16 | (United States) Wright Motorsports | (United States) Ryan Hardwick (Belgium) Jan Heylen | Porsche 4.0 L Flat-6 | 66 | +7 Laps |
| 14 | GTD | 8 | 96 | (United States) Turner Motorsport | (United States) Robby Foley (United States) Bill Auberlen | BMW M4 GT3 | 65 | +8 Laps |
| 14 | GTD | 8 | 96 | (United States) Turner Motorsport | (United States) Robby Foley (United States) Bill Auberlen | BMW S58B30T0 3.0 L Twin Turbo I6 | 65 | +8 Laps |
| 15 DNF | GTD | 9 | 51 | (Philippines) RWR Eurasia Motorsport | (Australia) Aidan Read (United States) Ryan Eversley | Acura NSX GT3 Evo22 | 62 | Fuel Pressure |
| 15 DNF | GTD | 9 | 51 | (Philippines) RWR Eurasia Motorsport | (Australia) Aidan Read (United States) Ryan Eversley | Acura 3.5 L Turbo V6 | 62 | Fuel Pressure |
| 16 DNF | GTD | 10 | 57 | (United States) Winward Racing | (United States) Russell Ward (United Kingdom) Philip Ellis | Mercedes-AMG GT3 Evo | 17 | Accident |
| 16 DNF | GTD | 10 | 57 | (United States) Winward Racing | (United States) Russell Ward (United Kingdom) Philip Ellis | Mercedes-AMG M159 6.2 L V8 | 17 | Accident |

== Standings after the race ==
DPi Drivers' Championship standings
| Pos. | +/– | Driver | Points |
|---|---|---|---|
| 1 | 1 | (United Kingdom) Tom Blomqvist (United Kingdom) Oliver Jarvis | 2027 |
| 2 | 1 | (Portugal) Filipe Albuquerque (United States) Ricky Taylor | 2017 |
| 3 | | (United Kingdom) Alex Lynn (New Zealand) Earl Bamber | 1931 |
| 4 | 2 | (France) Sébastien Bourdais (Netherlands) Renger van der Zande | 1884 |
| 5 | 1 | (France) Tristan Vautier (United Kingdom) Richard Westbrook | 1868 |

LMP2 Drivers' Championship standings
| Pos. | +/– | Driver | Points |
|---|---|---|---|
| 1 | | (Colombia) Juan Pablo Montoya (Sweden) Henrik Hedman | 972 |
| 2 | | (United Kingdom) Ryan Dalziel (United States) Dwight Merriman | 963 |
| 3 | | (United States) Steven Thomas (United States) Jonathan Bomarito | 950 |
| 4 | | (Canada) John Farano | 948 |
| 5 | | (United States) Josh Pierson | 900 |

LMP3 Drivers' Championship standings
| Pos. | +/– | Driver | Points |
|---|---|---|---|
| 1 | | (Canada) Garett Grist (United States) Ari Balogh | 688 |
| 2 | | (United States) Jon Bennett (United States) Colin Braun | 661 |
| 3 | | (Portugal) João Barbosa (United States) Lance Willsey | 647 |
| 4 | | (United States) Dakota Dickerson | 635 |
| 5 | | (United States) Daniel Goldburg (Sweden) Rasmus Lindh | 596 |

GTD Pro Drivers' Championship standings
| Pos. | +/– | Driver | Points |
|---|---|---|---|
| 1 | | (Australia) Matt Campbell (France) Mathieu Jaminet | 1345 |
| 2 | | (Spain) Antonio García (United States) Jordan Taylor | 1295 |
| 3 | | (United Kingdom) Ben Barnicoat (United Kingdom) Jack Hawksworth | 1265 |
| 4 | | (United States) Cooper MacNeil | 1112 |
| 5 | | (United Kingdom) Ross Gunn (Spain) Alex Riberas | 1106 |

GTD Drivers' Championship standings
| Pos. | +/– | Driver | Points |
|---|---|---|---|
| 1 | | (United Kingdom) Stevan McAleer | 1520 |
| 2 | | (United States) Ryan Hardwick (Belgium) Jan Heylen | 1486 |
| 3 | | (United States) Bill Auberlen (United States) Robby Foley | 1391 |
| 4 | 1 | (United States) Frankie Montecalvo | 1314 |
| 5 | 4 | (Canada) Roman De Angelis | 1289 |

- Note: Only the top five positions are included for all sets of standings.

DPi Teams' Championship standings
| Pos. | +/– | Team | Points |
|---|---|---|---|
| 1 | 1 | (United States) #60 Meyer Shank Racing w/ Curb-Agajanian | 2027 |
| 2 | 1 | (United States) #10 WTR - Konica Minolta Acura | 2017 |
| 3 | | (United States) #02 Cadillac Racing | 1931 |
| 4 | 2 | (United States) #01 Cadillac Racing | 1884 |
| 5 | 1 | (United States) #5 JDC-Miller MotorSports | 1868 |

LMP2 Teams' Championship standings
| Pos. | +/– | Team | Points |
|---|---|---|---|
| 1 | | (United States) #52 PR1/Mathiasen Motorsports | 982 |
| 2 | | (United States) #81 DragonSpeed USA | 972 |
| 3 | | (United States) #18 Era Motorsport | 963 |
| 4 | | (United States) #11 PR1/Mathiasen Motorsports | 950 |
| 5 | | (United States) #8 Tower Motorsport | 948 |

LMP3 Teams' Championship standings
| Pos. | +/– | Team | Points |
|---|---|---|---|
| 1 | | (United States) #30 Jr III Motorsports | 688 |
| 2 | | (United States) #54 CORE Autosport | 661 |
| 3 | | (United States) #33 Sean Creech Motorsport | 647 |
| 4 | | (United States) #38 Performance Tech Motorsports | 596 |
| 5 | | (United States) #74 Riley Motorsports | 583 |

GTD Pro Teams' Championship standings
| Pos. | +/– | Team | Points |
|---|---|---|---|
| 1 | | (Canada) #9 Pfaff Motorsports | 1345 |
| 2 | | (United States) #3 Corvette Racing | 1295 |
| 3 | | (United States) #14 Vasser Sullivan Racing | 1265 |
| 4 | | (United States) #79 WeatherTech Racing | 1112 |
| 5 | | (United States) #23 Heart of Racing Team | 1106 |

GTD Teams' Championship standings
| Pos. | +/– | Team | Points |
|---|---|---|---|
| 1 | | (United States) #32 Gilbert Korthoff Motorsports | 1520 |
| 2 | | (United States) #16 Wright Motorsports | 1486 |
| 3 | | (United States) #96 Turner Motorsport | 1391 |
| 4 | 1 | (United States) #12 Vasser Sullivan Racing | 1314 |
| 5 | 3 | (United States) #27 Heart of Racing Team | 1289 |

- Note: Only the top five positions are included for all sets of standings.

DPi Manufacturers' Championship standings
| Pos. | +/– | Manufacturer | Points |
|---|---|---|---|
| 1 | 1 | (United States) Cadillac | 2214 |
| 2 | 1 | (Japan) Acura | 2208 |

GTD Pro Manufacturers' Championship standings
| Pos. | +/– | Manufacturer | Points |
|---|---|---|---|
| 1 | | (Germany) Porsche | 1345 |
| 2 | | (United States) Chevrolet | 1305 |
| 3 | | (Japan) Lexus | 1295 |
| 4 | | (Germany) Mercedes-AMG | 1220 |
| 5 | | (Germany) BMW | 1180 |

GTD Manufacturers' Championship standings
| Pos. | +/– | Manufacturer | Points |
|---|---|---|---|
| 1 | 2 | (Germany) BMW | 1619 |
| 2 | 1 | (Germany) Mercedes-AMG | 1615 |
| 3 | 1 | (Germany) Porsche | 1571 |
| 4 | | (United Kingdom) Aston Martin | 1558 |
| 5 | 1 | (Japan) Lexus | 1517 |

- Note: Only the top five positions are included for all sets of standings.

== Notes ==
IMSA SportsCar Championship
| Previous race: 2022 Lexus Grand Prix at Mid-Ohio | 2022 season | Next race: 2022 Sahlen's Six Hours of The Glen |
