= Cooper MacNeil =

American businessman and racing driver (born 1992)

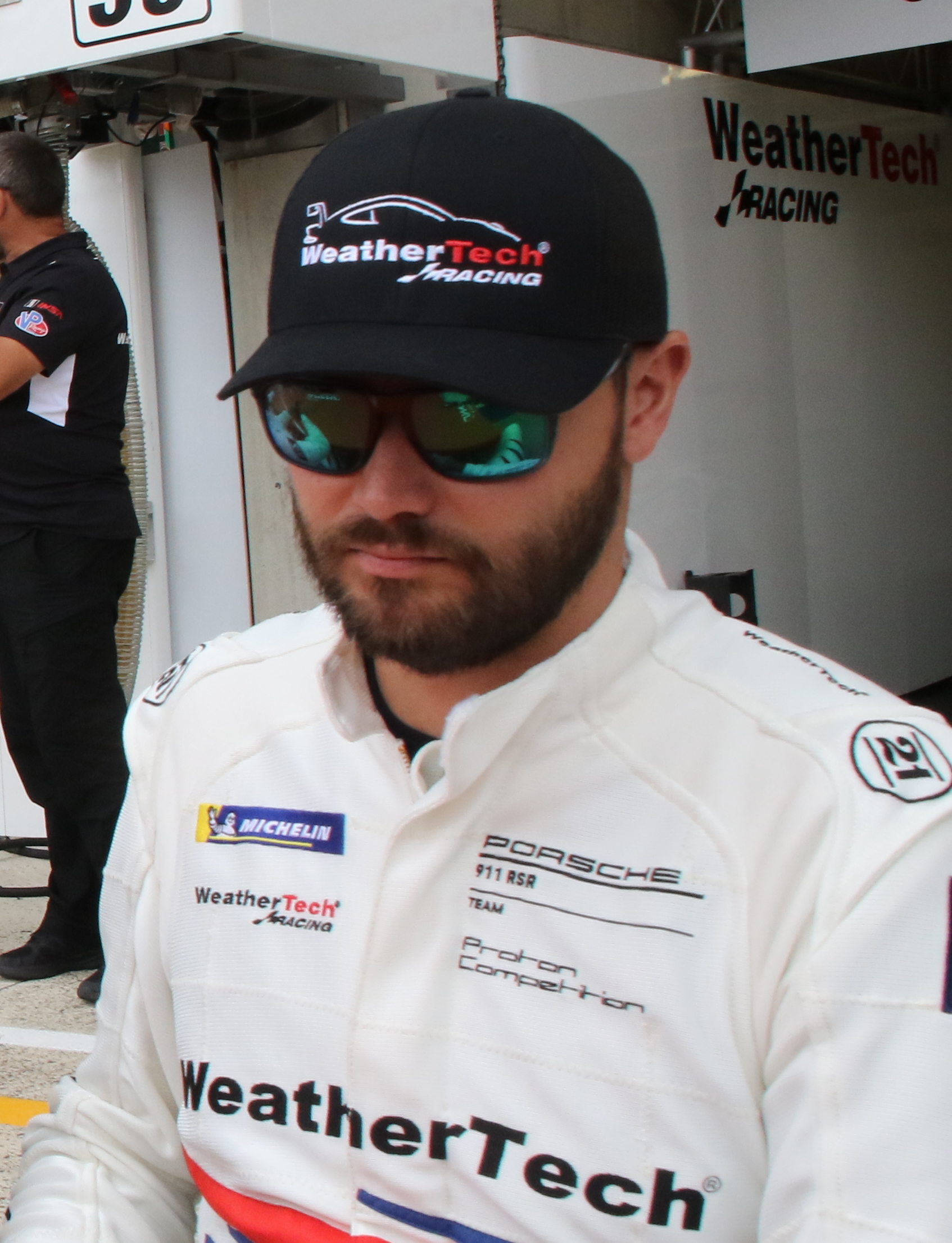
- MacNeil during the 2022 24 Hours of Le Mans autograph session
- Nationality: (United States) American
- Born: Cooper Ian MacNeil; September 7, 1992 (age 34) Hinsdale, Illinois, U.S.

WeatherTech SportsCar Championship career
- Debut season: 2009
- Current team: WeatherTech Racing / Proton Competition
- Categorisation: FIA Silver
- Car number: 79
- Former teams: Alex Job Racing; Riley Motorsports

Championship titles
- 2012-2013: ALMS – GTC class

Cooper Ian MacNeil (born September 7, 1992 in Hinsdale, Illinois) is an American businessman and retired professional racecar driver. He most recently competed in the WeatherTech SportsCar Championship driving the No. 79 WeatherTech Racing Mercedes-Benz AMG GT3 with co-drivers Dani Juncadella, Maro Engel, and Jules Gounon. He is son of WeatherTech owner and car collector David MacNeil. Cooper has won the 24 Hours of Daytona, Petit Le Mans three times, 12 hours of Sebring twice, and has been on the podium at the 24 Hours of Le Mans three times (2x third place, 1x second place). He has also won the SCCA Runoffs and is a four-time Ferrari Challenge Champion (2018, 2019, 2020, 2021).

== 2010 ==
MacNeil won the National SCCA Touring 2 Points Championship and finished second place in the SCCA Runoffs at Road America.

== 2011 ==
MacNeil competed in his first 24 Hours of Daytona. He captured his first win in Ferrari Challenge at Mazda Raceway Laguna Seca as well as his first win in IMSA GT3 Cup Challenge at Montreal.

== 2012 ==
Alex Job Racing racing with a full ride with teammate Leh Keen. During the 12 Hours of Sebring, Leh and his teammates led a strong battle throughout the race. Encountered minor hiccups and climbed one spot to a second-place finish. At Long Beach consistent podium battle. Lost lead half way through on pit stop and never regained the top position. Leh won pole at Lime Rock Park. Cooper started the Porsche and keeps team in top three before handing car to Leh who, despite several on-track run ins, brings the car home in first place under caution. Leh qualified car in third at Canadian Tire Motorsport Park. Cooper MacNeil starts car and has excellent run, handing car over to Cooper in the GTC lead. Leh dices with No. 66 Porsche and No. 11 Porsche before finishing second. Leh and Cooper struggle with brake issues early at Mid-Ohio Sports Car Course and finishing fourth. Cooper started car in second at Baltimore and hands off to Leh still running second. Leh lead briefly, but finished second. Cooper and Leh ran in top three for duration of VIR race, leading multiple times. Leh took the lead on final lap when #11 JDX car must pit for fuel. The win seals GTC driver championship for Cooper and team championship for Alex Job Racing. As for in the Rolex Sports Car Series Leh and Andrew finished eighth in GT points. Four third-place finishes, including Rolex 24 At Daytona and Indianapolis Motor Speedway.

== Retirement ==
MacNeil retired from racing after the 2023 24 Hours of Daytona to focus on running WeatherTech.

== Racing record ==
=== Racing career summary ===
Season	Series	Team	Races	Wins	Poles	F/Laps	Podiums	Points	Position
2012	American Le Mans Series - GTC	Alex Job Racing	10	3	0	0	7	161	1st
2013	American Le Mans Series - GTC	Alex Job Racing	10	2	0	0	6	148	1st
2013	24 Hours of Le Mans - LMGTE Am	Larbre Compétition	1	0	0	0	0	N/A	11th
2014	United SportsCar Championship - GTD	Alex Job Racing	11	0	0	0	1	295	3rd
2014	24 Hours of Le Mans - LMGTE Pro	Prospeed Competition	1	0	0	0	0	N/A	5th
2015	United SportsCar Championship - GTD	Alex Job Racing	10	0	0	0	1	262	7th
2016	IMSA SportsCar Championship - GTD	Alex Job Racing	8	0	0	0	0	190	12th
2017	IMSA Sportscar Championship - GTD	Riley Motorsports - WeatherTech Racing	12	1	0	0	1	254	11th
2017	24 Hours of Le Mans - LMGTE Am	Scuderia Corsa	1	0	0	0	1	N/A	3rd
2018	IMSA SportsCar Championship - GTD	Scuderia Corsa	11	1	0	0	4	295	4th
2018	24 Hours of Le Mans - LMGTE Am	JMW Motorsport	1	0	0	0	0	N/A	5th
2019	IMSA SportsCar Championship - GTD	Scuderia Corsa	11	0	0	0	4	246	5th
2019	24 Hours of Le Mans - LMGTE Am	WeatherTech Racing	1	0	0	0	1	N/A	3rd
2020	IMSA SportsCar Championship - GTD	Scuderia Corsa	9	1	0	0	2	206	14th
2020	24 Hours of Le Mans - LMGTE Pro	WeatherTech Racing	1	0	0	0	0	N/A	DNF
2021	IMSA SportsCar Championship - GTLM	WeatherTech Racing	10	3	0	0	8	3356	3rd
2021	European Le Mans Series – LMGTE	WeatherTech Racing	5	0	0	0	0	38	11th
2021	24 Hours of Le Mans - LMGTE Pro	WeatherTech Racing	1	0	0	0	0	N/A	DNF
2022	IMSA SportsCar Championship - GTD Pro	WeatherTech Racing	6	0	0	0	1	1701	7th
2022	IMSA SportsCar Championship - GTD	WeatherTech Racing	3	0	0	0	0	756	32nd
2022	24 Hours of Le Mans - LMGTE Am	WeatherTech Racing	1	0	0	0	1	N/A	2nd
2023	IMSA SportsCar Championship - GTD Pro	WeatherTech Racing	1	1	0	0	1	385	21st

== SCCA National Championship Runoffs ==
Year	Track	Car	Engine	Class	Finish	Start	Status
2009	Road America	Mini Cooper S	BMW	Touring 3	6	10	Running
2010	Road America	BMW M3	BMW	Touring 2	2	8	Running
2012	Road America	Ford Mustang GT	Ford	Touring 2	DNS	6	Retired
2015	Daytona	BMW M3	BMW	Touring 2	2	2	Running
2019	Virginia International Raceway	Porsche Carrera S 997.2	Porsche	Touring 2	1	1	Running

=== Grand-Am Rolex Sports Car Series results ===
(key) (Races in bold indicate pole position; results in italics indicate fastest lap)

Year	Team	Class	Make	Engine	1	2	3	4	5	6	7	8	9	10	11	12	13	Rank	Points	Ref
2011	Mitchum Motorsports	GT	Porsche 911 GT3 Cup	Porsche 3.8L Flat-6	DAY; 30	HOM	BAR	VIR	LIM	WGI	ROA	LAG	NJ	WGI	MON	LEX		57th	16	
2012	Alex Job Racing	GT	Porsche 911 GT3 Cup	Porsche 3.8L Flat-6	DAY; 17	BAR	HOM	NJ	DET	LEX	ELK	WGI	IMS	WGI	MON	LGA	LIM	68th	16	
2013	Alex Job Racing	GT	Porsche 911 GT3 Cup	Porsche 4.0L Flat-6	DAY; 6	COA	BAR	ATL	DET	MOH	WAT	IMS	ELK	KAN	LAG	LRP		66th	25	

=== Complete American Le Mans Series results ===
(key) (Races in bold indicate pole position; results in italics indicate fastest lap)

Year	Team	Class	Make	Engine	1	2	3	4	5	6	7	8	9	10	Rank	Points	Ref
2012	Alex Job Racing	GTC	Porsche 911 GT3 Cup	Porsche 4.0L Flat-6	SEB; 2	**LBH**; **2**	LAG; 4	**LIM**; **1**	MOS; 2	LEX; 4	**ROA**; **1**	BAL; 2	VIR; 1	**PET**; **5†**	1st	161	
2013	Alex Job Racing	GTC	Porsche 911 GT3 Cup	Porsche 4.0L Flat-6	SEB; 1	**LBH**; **4**	**LAG**; **3**	LIM; 5†	**MOS**; **1**	ROA; 2	**BAL**; **2**	COA; 6	VIR; 2	PET; 4	1st	148	

^{†} Did not finish the race but was classified as his car completed more than 70% of the overall winner's race distance.

=== 24 Hours of Le Mans results ===
Year	Team	Co-Drivers	Car	Class	Laps	Pos.	Class Pos.
2013	(France) Larbre Compétition	(France) Manuel Rodrigues (France) Philippe Dumas	Chevrolet Corvette C6.R	GTE; Am	268	41st	11th
2014	(Belgium) Prospeed Competition	(Netherlands) Jeroen Bleekemolen	Porsche 997 GT3-RSR	GTE; Pro	319	33rd	5th
2017	(United States) Scuderia Corsa	(United States) Bill Sweedler (United States) Townsend Bell	Ferrari 488 GTE	GTE; Am	331	29th	**3rd**
2018	(United Kingdom) JMW Motorsport	(United Kingdom) Liam Griffin (United States) Jeff Segal	Ferrari 488 GTE	GTE; Am	332	30th	5th
2019	(United States) WeatherTech Racing	(United Kingdom) Robert Smith (Finland) Toni Vilander	Ferrari 488 GTE	GTE; Am	333	33rd	**3rd**
2020	(United States) WeatherTech Racing	(United States) Jeff Segal (Finland) Toni Vilander	Ferrari 488 GTE Evo	GTE; Pro	185	DNF	DNF
2021	(United States) WeatherTech Racing	(New Zealand) Earl Bamber (Belgium) Laurens Vanthoor	Porsche 911 RSR-19	GTE; Pro	139	DNF	DNF
2022	(United States) WeatherTech Racing	(France) Julien Andlauer (United States) Thomas Merrill	Porsche 911 RSR-19	GTE; Am	343	35th	**2nd**

=== Complete WeatherTech SportsCar Championship results ===
(key) (Races in bold indicate pole position; results in italics indicate fastest lap)

Year	Team	Class	Make	Engine	1	2	3	4	5	6	7	8	9	10	11	12	Pos.	Points	Ref
2014	Alex Job Racing	GTD	Porsche 911 GT America	Porsche 4.0L Flat-6	DAY; 8	SEB; 4	LGA; 4	DET; 5	**WGL**; 12	MOS; 5	IND; 5	ELK; 2	VIR; 5	COA; 5	PET; 8		3rd	295	
2015	Alex Job Racing	GTD	Porsche 911 GT America	Porsche 4.0L Flat-6	DAY; 2	SEB; 7	LGA; 7	DET; 4	WGL; 5	LIM; 7	ELK; 7	VIR; 6	COA; 9	PET; 8			7th	262	
2016	Alex Job Racing	GTD	Porsche 911 GT3 R	Porsche 4.0L Flat-6	DAY; 13	SEB; 5	LGA; 7	DET; 7	WGL; 5	MOS; 7	LIM; 9	ELK; 11					12th	190	
2017	Riley Motorsports - WeatherTech Racing	GTD	Mercedes-AMG GT3	Mercedes-AMG M159 6.2 V8	DAY; 21	SEB; 21	LBH; 1	COA; 6	DET; 12	WGL; 4	MOS; 11	LIM; 10					11th	254	
2017	Riley Motorsports - WeatherTech Racing	GTD	Porsche 911 GT3 R	Porsche 4.0L Flat-6									ELK; 9	VIR; 6	LGA; 6	PET; 17	11th	254	
2018	Scuderia Corsa	GTD	Ferrari 488 GT3	Ferrari F154CB 3.9 Turbo V8	DAY; 10	SEB; 2	MOH; 8	DET; 5	WGL; 7	MOS; 8	LIM; 3	ELK; 3	VIR; 4	LGA; 8	**PET**; 1		4th	295	
2019	Scuderia Corsa	GTD	Ferrari 488 GT3	Ferrari F154CB 3.9 Turbo V8	DAY; 23	SEB; 3	MOH; 7	DET; 12	WGL; 3	MOS; 9	LIM; 11	ELK; 7	VIR; 3	LGA; 2	PET; 5		5th	246	
2020	Scuderia Corsa	GTD	Ferrari 488 GT3	Ferrari F154CB 3.9 Turbo V8	DAY; 7	DAY; 5	SEB; 2	ELK; 4	VIR; 13	ATL; 9	MOH	CLT	PET; 1	LGA; 7	SEB; 4		14th	206	
2021	WeatherTech Racing	GTLM	Porsche 911 RSR-19	Porsche 4.2 L Flat-6	DAY; 6	SEB; 1	WGL; 5	WGL; 3	LIM; 3	ELK; 1	LGA; 3	LBH; 3	VIR; 3	PET; 1			3rd	3356	
2022	WeatherTech Racing	GTD Pro	Porsche 911 GT3 R	Porsche MA1.76/MDG.G 4.0 L Flat-6	DAY; 8	SEB; 6											7th	1701	
2022	WeatherTech Racing	GTD Pro	Mercedes-AMG GT3 Evo	Mercedes-AMG M159 6.2 L V8	DAY; 11	SEB; 3	LBH; 5	LGA; 6	WGL; 5	MOS; 4	LIM	ELK	VIR	PET			7th	1701	
2022	WeatherTech Racing	GTD	Mercedes-AMG GT3 Evo	Mercedes-AMG M159 6.2 L V8	DAY	SEB	LBH	LGA	MID	DET	WGL	MOS	LIM; 7	ELK; 11	VIR; 6	PET	32nd	756	
2023	WeatherTech Racing	GTD Pro	Mercedes-AMG GT3 Evo	Mercedes-AMG M159 6.2 L V8	**DAY**; **1**	SEB	LBH	MON	WGL	MOS	LIM	ELK	VIR	IMS	PET		21st	385	

=== Complete European Le Mans Series results ===
(key) (Races in bold indicate pole position; results in italics indicate fastest lap)

Year	Entrant	Class	Chassis	Engine	1	2	3	4	5	6	Rank	Points
2021	WeatherTech Racing	LMGTE	Porsche 911 RSR-19	Porsche 4.2 L Flat-6	CAT	RBR; 6	LEC; 4	MNZ; 9	SPA; 7	ALG; 5	11th	38
