= Frankie Montecalvo =

American racing driver (born 1990)

Frank Montecalvo
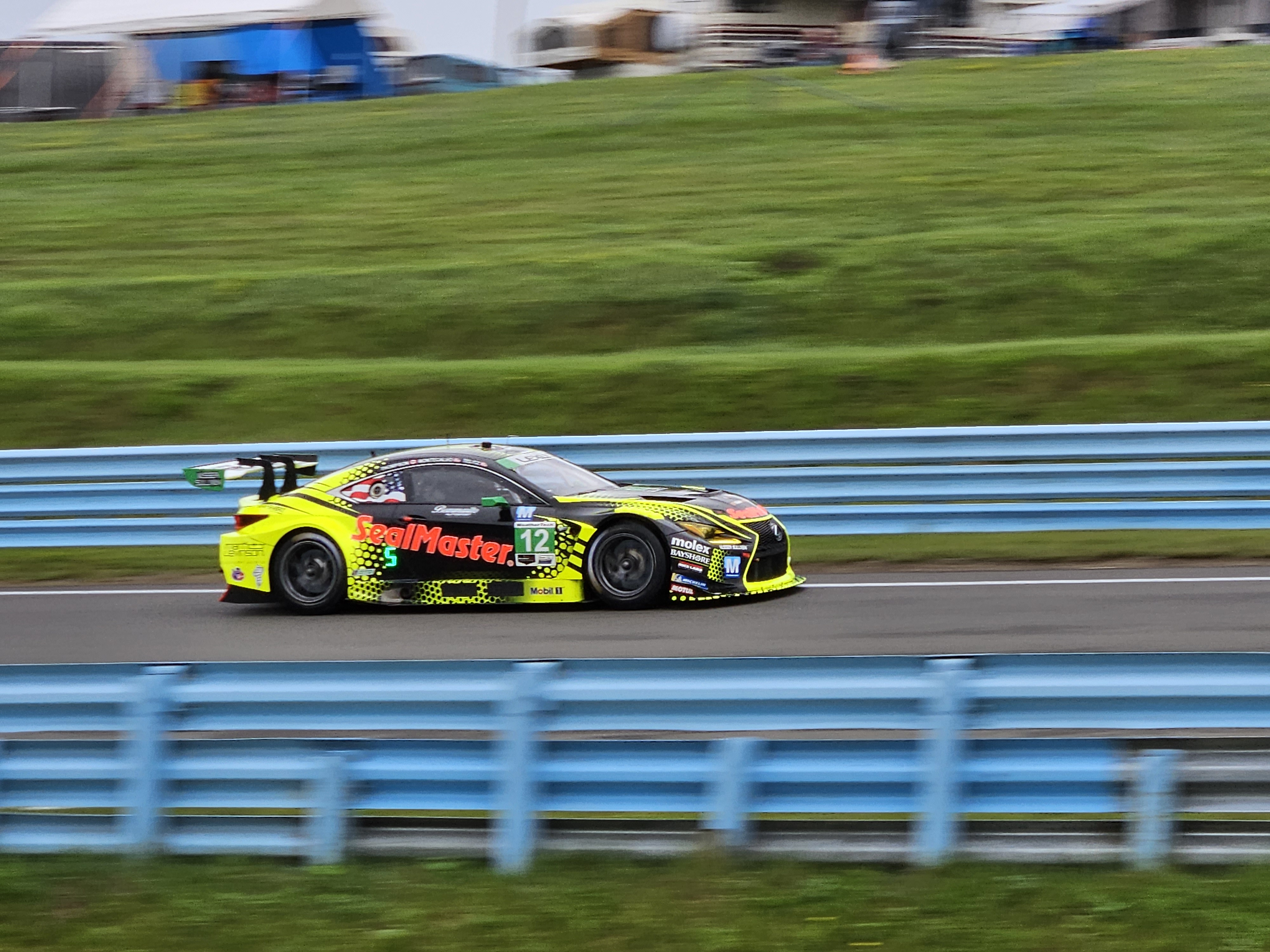
- Nationality: (United States) American
- Born: Frank Montecalvo; December 28, 1990 (age 35) Highlands, New Jersey, U.S.

WeatherTech SportsCar Championship career
- Debut season: 2014
- Current team: AIM Vasser Sullivan
- Categorisation: FIA Silver
- Car number: 12
- Former teams: Scuderia Corsa; Alex Job Racing; PR1/Mathiasen Motorsports
- Wins: 1
- Podiums: 11
- Poles: 4

Previous series
- 2010–2011 2015–2017: American Le Mans Series; Pirelli World Challenge

Championship titles
- 2015: Pirelli World Challenge – GTA Class

Frank Montecalvo (born December 28, 1990) is an American racing driver who currently competes in the WeatherTech SportsCar Championship.

== Early life ==
A native of Highlands, New Jersey, Montecalvo attended high school at St. John Vianney High School.

== Career ==
In 2012, Montecalvo took part in his first 24 Hours of Le Mans, driving for Luxury Racing in the GTE Am class. The team started fourth in class but failed to finish the race, retiring with crash damage after 146 laps. Montecalvo returned to Le Mans in 2014, replacing Enzo Potolicchio in the 8 Star Motorsports GTE Am entry. In 2015, Montecalvo won the GTA class of the Pirelli World Challenge.

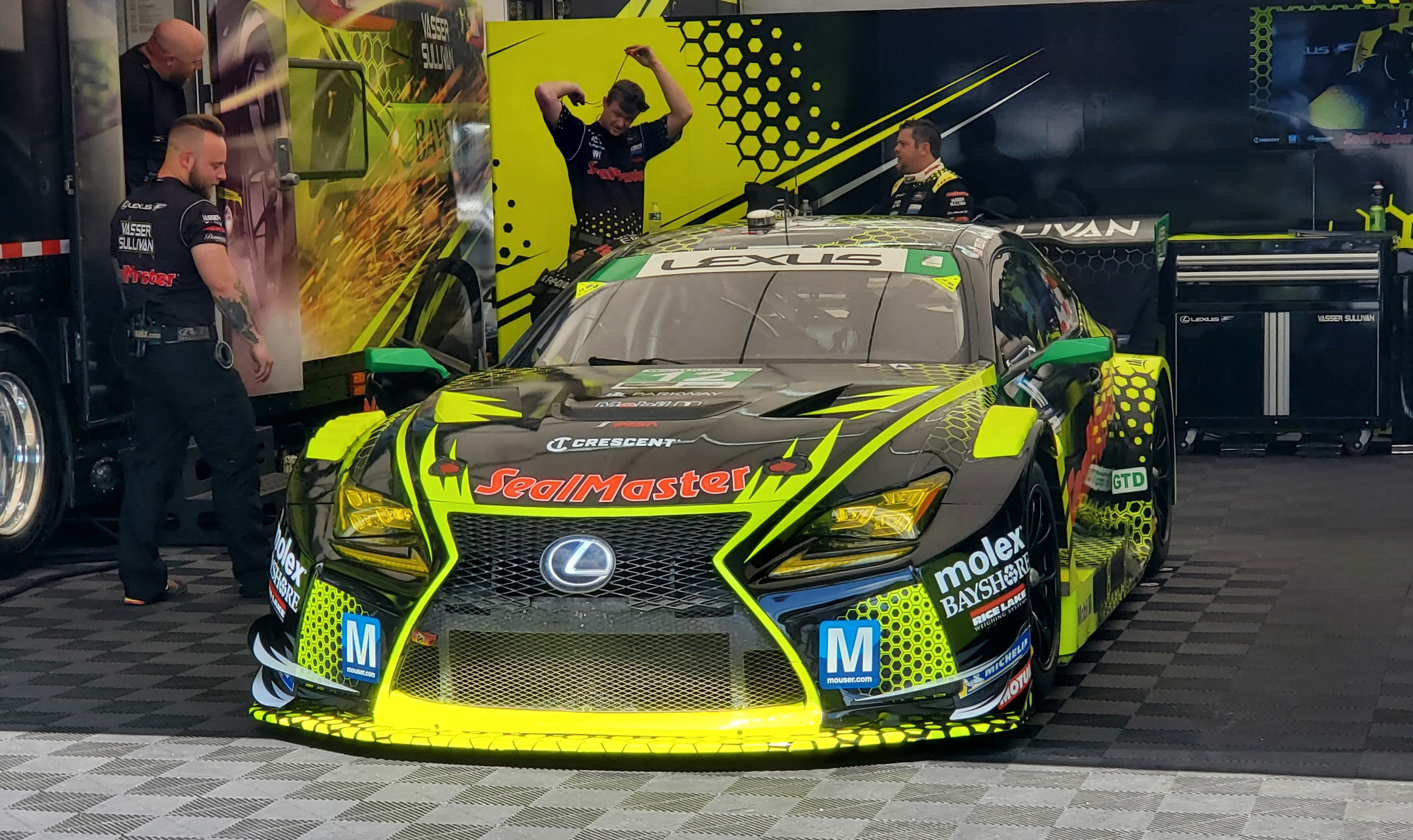
Montecalvo's Lexus RC F GT3 at Watkins Glen in 2022.

Prior to the 2019 WeatherTech SportsCar Championship season, Montecalvo joined AIM Vasser Sullivan in the GTD class, driving alongside Townsend Bell. Montecalvo scored his first IMSA victory in August 2020 at Road America. In 2023, Montecalvo returned for his fifth consecutive season with the team, and his second with Aaron Telitz as his co-driver. That season, Montecalvo claimed his second career IMSA victory, supporting a Lexus GT-class sweep at the 2023 Sahlen's Six Hours of The Glen.

== Personal life ==
As of August 2023, Montecalvo is not a professional racing driver, working a day job at his family's recycling business.

== Racing record ==
=== Career summary ===
Season	Series	Team	Races	Wins	Poles	F/Laps	Podiums	Points	Position
2009	KONI Sports Car Challenge - GS	Kinetic Motorsports	6	0	?	?	0	112	26th
2010	IMSA Prototype Lites - L1	Gunnar Racing	9	1	0	1	1	90	11th
2010	Continental Tire Sports Car Challenge - GS	Multimatic Motorsports	5	0	0	1	0	39	36th
2010	American Le Mans Series - LMPC	Genoa Racing	4	0	0	0	1	37	16th
2011	American Le Mans Series - LMPC	CORE Autosport	9	0	0	0	4	130	**2nd**
2012	FIA World Endurance Championship - LMGTE Am	Luxury Racing	2	0	0	0	0	0	NC
2012	24 Hours of Le Mans - LMGTE Am	Luxury Racing	1	0	0	0	0	N/A	DNF
2012	Continental Tire Sports Car Challenge - ST	Multimatic Motorsports	2	0	0	0	0	6	86th
2013	Continental Tire Sports Car Challenge - GS	Multimatic Motorsports	9	0	0	0	2	191	15th
2013	European Le Mans Series - LMGTE	Ram Racing	5	0	0	0	3	63	5th
2014	United SportsCar Championship - Prototype Challenge	PR1/Mathiasen Motorsports	10	0	0	0	2	255	4th
2014	FIA World Endurance Championship - LMGTE Am	8 Star Motorsports	1	0	0	0	0	24	15th
2014	24 Hours of Le Mans - LMGTE Am	8 Star Motorsports	1	0	0	0	0	N/A	4th
2015	Pirelli World Challenge - GTA	DragonSpeed	20	7	6	6	14	2073	**1st**
2016	Pirelli World Challenge - GTA	DIME Racing	14	2	5	7	8	1200	**3rd**
2016	24H Series - A6-Pro	Black Falcon	1	0	0	0	1	?	?
2017	Pirelli World Challenge SprintX - GT Pro-Am	AIM Autosport	9	0	5	0	4	156	4th
2017	Pirelli World Challenge - GTS	ANSA Motorsports	2	0	0	0	0	31	16th
2017	IMSA SportsCar Championship - GTD	Alex Job Racing	4	0	0	0	0	83	32nd
2018	IMSA SportsCar Championship - GTD	Scuderia Corsa	5	0	0	0	0	109	17th
2019	IMSA SportsCar Championship - GTD	AIM Vasser Sullivan	11	0	0	0	3	236	8th
2020	IMSA SportsCar Championship - GTD	AIM Vasser Sullivan	10	1	2	0	2	223	13th
2021	IMSA SportsCar Championship - GTD	Vasser Sullivan Racing	12	0	0	0	3	2538	8th
2022	IMSA SportsCar Championship - GTD	Vasser Sullivan Racing	12	0	2	0	3	2602	8th
2023	IMSA SportsCar Championship - GTD	Vasser Sullivan Racing	11	1	0	0	2	2927	**3rd**
2024	IMSA SportsCar Championship - GTD	Vasser Sullivan	10	0	3	1	1	2334	7th
2024	IMSA SportsCar Championship - GTD Pro	Vasser Sullivan	1	0	0	0	0	301	34th
2025	IMSA SportsCar Championship - GTD	Vasser Sullivan Racing	6	0	0	0	3	1660	15th
2025	IMSA SportsCar Championship - GTD Pro	Vasser Sullivan Racing	1	0	0	0	0	242	36th
2026	IMSA SportsCar Championship - GTD	Vasser Sullivan Racing	6	0	1	1	0	1461	19th

=== Complete American Le Mans Series results ===
(key) (Races in bold indicate pole position)

Year	Team	Class	Chassis	Engine	1	2	3	4	5	6	7	8	9	Rank	Points	Ref
2010	Genoa Racing	LMPC	Oreca FLM09	Chevrolet 6.2L LS3 V8	SEB	LBH	LGA	UTA	LIM	MDO; 5	ELK; 5	MOS; 3	PET; 5	16th	37	
2011	CORE Autosport	LMPC	Oreca FLM09	Chevrolet 6.2L LS3 V8	SEB; 2	LBH; 4	LIM; 5	MOS; 2	MDO; 6	ELK; 3	BAL; 3	LGA; 4	PET; 5			

=== Complete European Le Mans Series results ===
(key) (Races in bold indicate pole position)

Year	Team	Class	Make	Engine	1	2	3	4	5	Rank	Points
2013	Ram Racing	LMGTE	Ferrari 458 Italia GT2	Ferrari F142 4.5L V8	SIL; 3	IMO; 3	RBR; 3	HUN; 6	LEC; 5	5th	63

=== Complete IMSA SportsCar Championship results ===
(key) (Races in bold indicate pole position)

Year	Team	Class	Make	Engine	1	2	3	4	5	6	7	8	9	10	11	12	Rank	Points	Ref
2014	PR1/Mathiasen Motorsports	PC	Oreca FLM09	Chevrolet 6.2L LS3 V8	DAY; 4	SEB; 9	LGA; 4	KAN; 4	WGL; 3	IMS; 5	ELK; 7	VIR; 8	COT; 4	PET; 3			4th	255	
2017	Alex Job Racing	GTD	Audi R8 LMS	Audi 5.2L V10	DAY; 6	SEB; 15	LBH	COT	DET	WGL; 14	MOS	LIM	ELK	VIR	LGA	PET; 6	32nd	83	
2018	Scuderia Corsa	GTD	Ferrari 488 GT3	Ferrari F154CB 3.9L Turbo V8	DAY; 5	SEB; 17	MDO	DET	WGL; 10	MOS	LIM	ELK	VIR	LGA; 9	PET; 5		17th	109	
2019	AIM Vasser Sullivan	GTD	Lexus RC F GT3	Lexus 5.0L V8	DAY; 2	SEB; 9	MDO; 5	DET; 3	WGL; 9	MOS; 3	LIM; 13	ELK; 9	VIR; 7	LGA; 11	PET; 11		8th	236	
2020	AIM Vasser Sullivan	GTD	Lexus RC F GT3	Lexus 5.0L V8	DAY; 12	DAY; 2	**SEB**; 5	ELK; 1	VIR; 10	**ATL**; 5	MDO; 10	CLT	PET; 8	LGA; 8	SEB; 9		13th	223	
2021	Vasser Sullivan Racing	GTD	Lexus RC F GT3	Lexus 5.0L V8	DAY; 13	SEB; 6	MDO; 2	DET; 5	WGL; 11	WGL; 2	LIM; 10	ELK; 6	LGA; 10	LBH; 13	VIR; 13	PET; 3	8th	2538	
2022	Vasser Sullivan Racing	GTD	Lexus RC F GT3	Toyota 2UR 5.0 L V8	DAY; 15	SEB; 7	LBH; 3	LGA; 8	MDO; 3	DET; 4	WGL; 16	**MOS**; 6	**LIM**; 8	ELK; 3	VIR; 4	PET; 13	8th	2602	
2023	Vasser Sullivan Racing	GTD	Lexus RC F GT3	Toyota 2UR 5.0 L V8	DAY; 5	SEB; 5	LBH; 3	MON; 14	WGL; 1	MOS; 6	LIM; 12	ELK; 5	VIR; 5	IMS; 14	PET; 16		3rd	2927	
2024	Vasser Sullivan	GTD	Lexus RC F GT3	Toyota 2UR 5.0 L V8	**DAY**; 15	SEB; 13	LBH; 15	LGA; 9		**WGL**; **4**	**MOS**; **5**	ELK; 11	VIR; 9	IMS; 22	PET; 3		7th	2334	
2024	Vasser Sullivan	GTD Pro	Lexus RC F GT3	Toyota 2UR 5.0 L V8					DET; 4								34th	301	
2025	Vasser Sullivan Racing	GTD	Lexus RC F GT3	Toyota 2UR 5.0 L V8	DAY; 14	SEB; 2	LBH; 3	LGA		WGL; 11	MOS	ELK	VIR	IMS; 9	PET; 3		15th	1660	
2025	Vasser Sullivan Racing	GTD Pro	Lexus RC F GT3	Toyota 2UR 5.0 L V8					DET; 9								36th	242	
2026	Vasser Sullivan Racing	GTD	Lexus RC F GT3	Toyota 2UR 5.0 L V8	DAY; 9	SEB; 12	LBH; 5	LGA	**WGL**; 4	MOS	ELK; 9	VIR	IMS	PET; 11			19th	1461	

=== Complete 24 Hours of Le Mans results ===
Year	Team	Co-Drivers	Car	Class	Laps	Pos.	Class Pos.
2012	(France) Luxury Racing	(Germany) Pierre Ehret (United States) Gunnar Jeannette	Ferrari 458 Italia GTC	GTE Am	146	DNF	DNF
2014	(United States) 8 Star Motorsports	(Italy) Gianluca Roda (Italy) Paolo Ruberti	Ferrari 458 Italia GT2	GTE Am	330	21st	4th
