= Vasser Sullivan Racing =

American motorsports team

(United States) Vasser Sullivan Racing
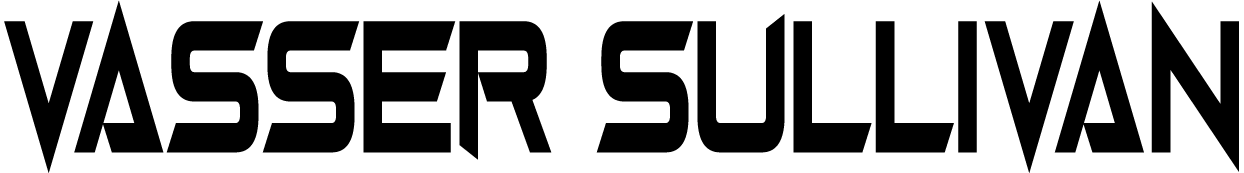
- Founded: 2018
- Base: Charlotte, North Carolina
- Team principal(s): James Sullivan; Jimmy Vasser
- Current series: IMSA SportsCar Championship
- Former series: IndyCar Series
- Noted drivers: (United Kingdom) Ben Barnicoat (United States) Townsend Bell (France) Sébastien Bourdais (United Kingdom) Jack Hawksworth (United States) Kyle Kirkwood (United States) Frankie Montecalvo (United States) Aaron Telitz (Canada) Parker Thompson
- Teams' Championships: 2023 IMSA SportsCar Championship GTD Pro
- Drivers' Championships: 2023 IMSA SportsCar Championship GTD Pro
- Website: https://vassersullivanracing.com/

Vasser Sullivan Racing is an American auto racing team based in Charlotte, North Carolina, established in 2018 by American businessman James Sullivan and 1996 PPG Indy Car World Series champion Jimmy Vasser. A longtime competitor in the IMSA SportsCar Championship, the team are currently responsible for Lexus' racing activities in the series, with which they won the 2023 IMSA SportsCar Championship GTD Pro Drivers' and Teams' championships with the Lexus RC F GT3. Vasser Sullivan Racing have also previously competed in the IndyCar Series in partnership with Dale Coyne Racing.

== Background ==
Prior to the creation of the team, Vasser Sullivan Racing's team owners, American businessman James Sullivan and CART champion Jimmy Vasser, had previously worked together since 2011. Sullivan founded motocross and rallycross team SH Racing after graduating from Baylor University in 2003, majoring in entrepreneurship and marketing. Vasser was a co-owner of KV Racing Technology, an IndyCar Series outfit formed alongside Australian venture capitalist Kevin Kalkhoven. Both teams came together to form KVSH Racing, competing in Global Rallycross and the IndyCar Series. They left the series in 2016, which followed with KV Racing Technology folding in 2017 after a failed partnership with Carlin Motorsport. A year later, Sullivan and Vasser partnered with Dale Coyne Racing for the 2018 IndyCar Series, and thus established the 'Vasser Sullivan' name for the first time.

== Racing history ==
=== IndyCar Series ===
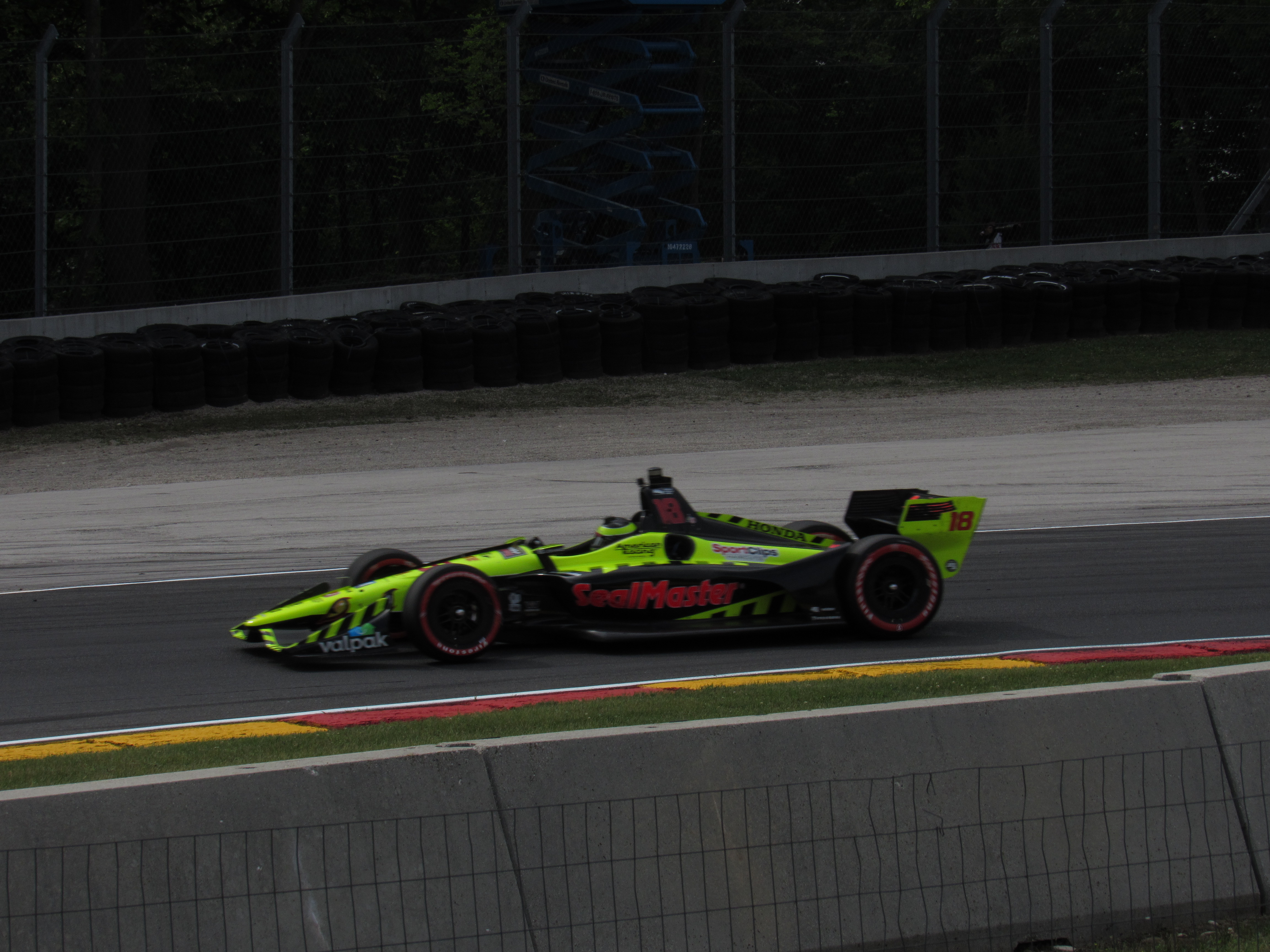
Sébastien Bourdais with the #18 Dale Coyne Racing with Vasser Sullivan Dallara DW12 at the 2018 Kohler Grand Prix.

In 2018, James Sullivan and Jimmy Vasser partnered up with Dale Coyne Racing, supporting four-time Champ Car World Series champion and longtime KVSH driver Sébastien Bourdais' entry for the 2018 IndyCar Series. Competing as Dale Coyne Racing with Vasser Sullivan, the team won in their first race together, as Bourdais won the 2018 Firestone Grand Prix of St. Petersburg, taking advantage of a collision at the race's final restart between frontrunners Robert Wickens and Alexander Rossi. After earning another podium at the 2018 Grand Prix of Portland, Bourdais completed his first year with the team with one victory and two podiums, finishing 7th overall. Bourdais and the team did not achieve the same level of consistency in their second season, scoring a podium at the 2019 Honda Indy Grand Prix of Alabama, but falling to 11th overall in the 2019 IndyCar Series standings.

Santino Ferrucci took over Bourdais' full-time seat in the 2020 IndyCar Series, following Bourdais' departure from the team and subsequent move to the IMSA SportsCar Championship. Ed Jones replaced Ferrucci a year later for the 2021 IndyCar Series, however, had trouble producing results. At the conclusion of the season, Dale Coyne Racing and Vasser Sullivan Racing concluded their partnership after four seasons of competition.

=== IMSA SportsCar Championship ===
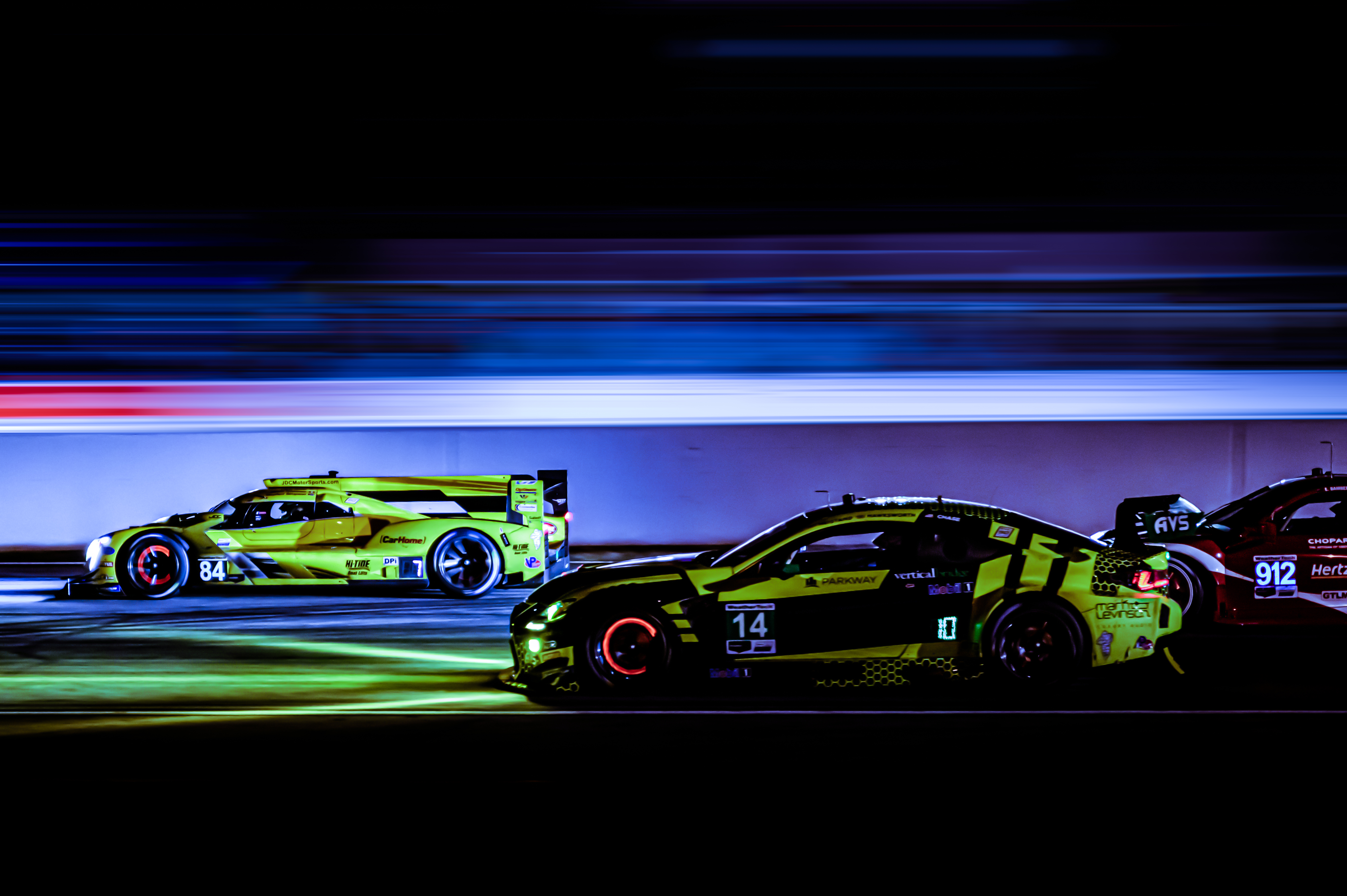
A Lexus RC F GT3 campaigned by Vasser Sullivan Racing in the 2019 IMSA SportsCar Championship season.

Vasser Sullivan Racing entered sports car racing for the first time in the 2019 IMSA SportsCar Championship, winning the bid to become Lexus' North American factory team and replacing 3GT Racing in the process. The team also formed a partnership with Canadian racing team AIM Autosport, as they entered the series together as AIM Vasser Sullivan. The combined effort recorded their first win in the third race of the 2019 season with Jack Hawksworth and Richard Heistand finishing at the front of the GTD class at the 2019 Sports Car Challenge of Mid-Ohio. After three seasons together, which saw numerous wins and podiums, Vasser Sullivan Racing announced that AIM Autosport would be departing from the team at the end of 2020. The team saw a significant overhaul in that year's off-season, as engineers, mechanics, and additional technical personnel hired from experienced IMSA, IndyCar, and NASCAR teams, including newly-hired team manager Greg Cates, who had multiple seasons of experience including with previous Lexus factory team 3GT Racing.

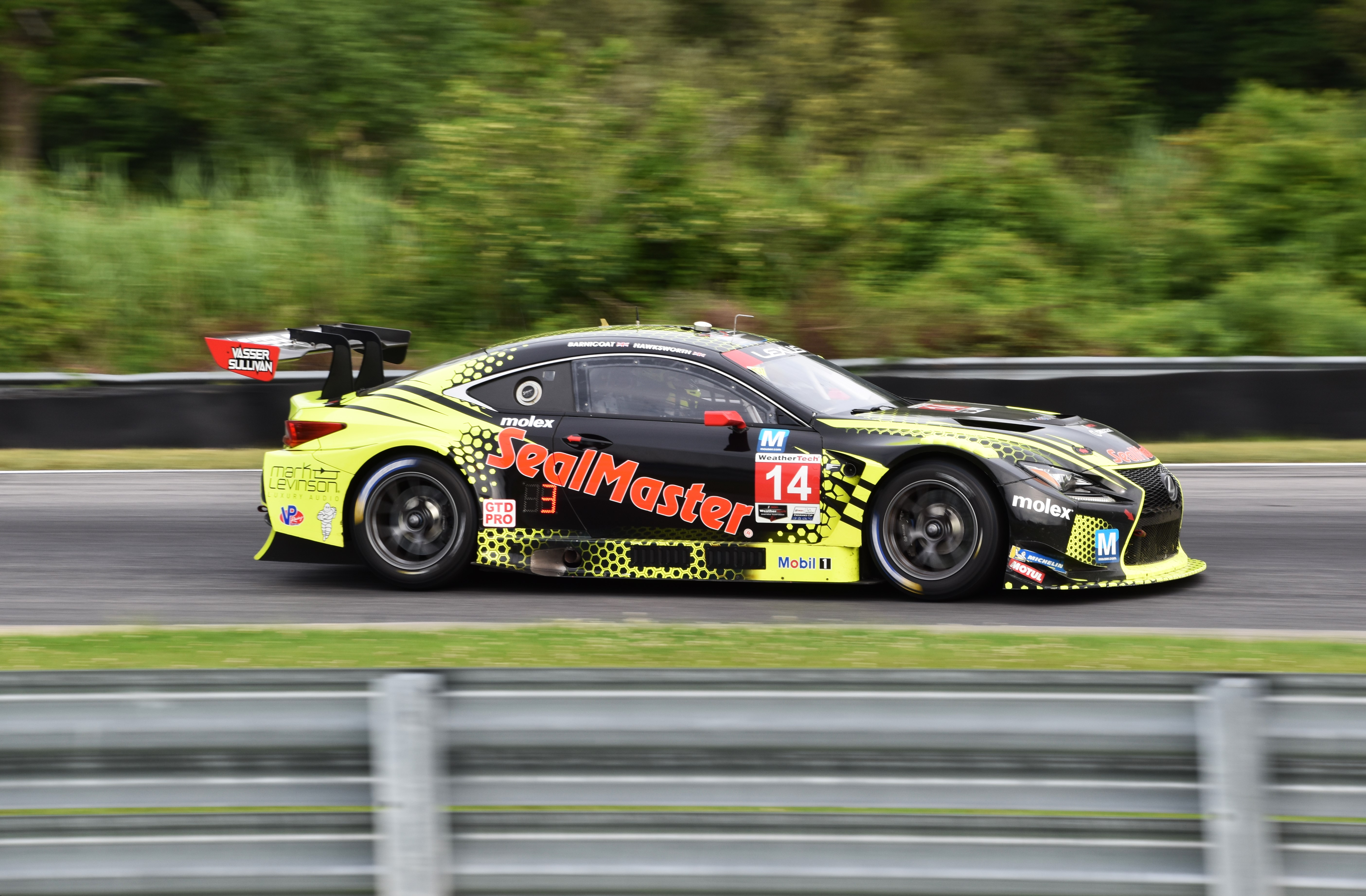
Vasser Sullivan Racing's #14 Lexus RC F GT3 at Lime Rock Park in 2022.

The team expanded further heading into the 2022 IMSA SportsCar Championship, signing Ben Barnicoat and Jack Hawksworth to drive the #14 GTD Pro car. Barnicoat joined the team at the behest of Hawksworth, who reached out to him to bring him into the team. The two have also worked closely off track as teammates, contributing to their on-track performance in endurance events.

Following the addition of Barnicoat, Aaron Telitz was moved to the #12 car alongside Frankie Montecalvo. Richard Heistand and Townsend Bell would return to join the No. 12 crew at the 2022 24 Hours of Daytona while Kyle Kirkwood joined the #14 squad in the same race and for the remaining endurance races that season.

Heading into 2023, Vasser Sullivan Racing brought in more experience for each of its teams. Veteran race engineer Geoff Fickling and mechanic Travis Morgan were appointed as race engineer and car chief for the #14 team, respectively. Chris Andrews and NASCAR crew member Jesse Goldin were also appointed as race engineer and car chief for the #12 team, respectively. Vasser Sullivan Racing won the 2023 IMSA SportsCar Championship GTD Pro Drivers' and Teams' championships with the #14 duo of Barnicoat and Hawksworth, securing the titles at the green flag of the 2023 Petit Le Mans, as the team carried a significant points margin from 2nd.

Hawksworth and Barnicoat were retained as full season drivers for the 2024 season. Vasser Sullivan Racing also placed third in the IMSA GTD championship but elected to swap in Parker Thompson into a full-season role alongside Frankie Montecalvo for the 2024 season. Aaron Telitz returned in an endurance driver role.

For 2025, the team elected to restructure its driver lineup, with Ben Barnicoat paired alongside Aaron Telitz in the #14 car in the IMSA GTD Pro class, while Jack Hawksworth and Parker Thompson will split duties of the #12 car in the GTD class. For the Michelin Endurance Cup, Kyle Kirkwood joined the #14 team while Frankie Montecalvo competed with the #12 team. Townsend Bell also returned with the #12 crew at the 2025 24 Hours of Daytona.

== Race results ==
=== Complete IndyCar Series results ===
(key)

Year	Chassis	Engine	Drivers	No.	1	2	3	4	5	6	7	8	9	10	11	12	13	14	15	16	17	18	19	Pos.	Pts.
Dale Coyne Racing with Vasser-Sullivan
2018					STP	PHX	LBH	ALA	IMS	INDY	DET		TXS	ROA	IOW	TOR	MDO	POC	GAT	POR	SNM				
2018	Dallara DW12	Honda HI18TT 2.2 L V6t	(France) Sébastien Bourdais	18	1	13	13	5	4	28	13	21	8	13	11	19	6	4	21	3	6			7th	425
2019					STP	COA	ALA	LBH	IMS	INDY	DET		TXS	ROA	TOR	IOW	MDO	POC	GAT	POR	LAG				
2019	Dallara DW12	Honda HI19TT 2.2 L V6t	(France) Sébastien Bourdais	18	24	5	3	11	11	30	11	9	8	12	8	9	11	7	19	9	7			11th	387
2020					TXS	IMS	ROA		IOW		INDY	GAT		MDO		IMS		STP							
2020	Dallara DW12	Honda HI20TT 2.2 L V6t	(United States) Santino Ferrucci	18	21	9	6	6	13	18	4	16	10	14	14	15	12	23						13th	290
2021					ALA	STP	TXS		IMS	INDY	DET		ROA	MDO	NSH	IMS	GAT	POR	LAG	LBH					
2021	Dallara DW12	Honda HI21TT 2.2 L V6t	(United Arab Emirates) Ed Jones	18	15	20	12	22	14	28	9	17	23	26	6	14	24	11	10	12				19th	233

=== Complete IMSA SportsCar Championship results ===
Year	Entrant	Class	No	Chassis	Engine	Drivers	1	2	3	4	5	6	7	8	9	10	11	12	Pos.	Pts
2019	(Canada) AIM Vasser Sullivan	GTD	12	Lexus RC F GT3	Toyota 2UR-GSE 5.4 L V8	(United States) Townsend Bell (United States) Frankie Montecalvo (United States) Jeff Segal (United States) Aaron Telitz	DAY; 2	SEB; 9	MDO; 5	DET; 3	WGL; 9	MOS; 3	LIM; 13	ELK; 9	VIR; 7	LGA; 11	ATL; 11		8th	236
2019	(Canada) AIM Vasser Sullivan	GTD	14	Lexus RC F GT3	Toyota 2UR-GSE 5.4 L V8	(Australia) Nick Cassidy (United States) Parker Chase (United States) Austin Cindric (Switzerland) Philipp Frommenwiler (United Kingdom) Jack Hawksworth (United States) Richard Heistand	DAY; 5	SEB; 15	MDO; 1	DET; 1†	WGL; 5	MOS; 12	LIM; 6	ELK; 4	VIR; 13	LGA; 9	ATL; 9		6th	237
2020	(Canada) AIM Vasser Sullivan	GTD	12	Lexus RC F GT3	Toyota 2UR-GSE 5.4 L V8	(United States) Townsend Bell (United States) Michael de Quesada (United States) Kyle Kirkwood (United States) Frankie Montecalvo (United States) Aaron Telitz (New Zealand) Shane van Gisbergen	DAY; 12	DAY; 2	SEB; 5	ELK; 1	VIR; 10	ATL; 5	MDO; 10	CLT	PET; 8	LGA; 8	SEB; 9		13th	223
2020	(Canada) AIM Vasser Sullivan	GTD	14	Lexus RC F GT3	Toyota 2UR-GSE 5.4 L V8	(United States) Kyle Busch (United States) Parker Chase (United States) Michael de Quesada (United Kingdom) Jack Hawksworth (United States) Kyle Kirkwood (Canada) Daniel Morad (United States) Aaron Telitz	DAY; 9	DAY; 1	SEB; 1†	ELK; 3	VIR; 4	ATL; 10	MDO; 1	CLT; 8	PET; 2	LGA; 11	SEB; 12		4th	265
2021	(United States) Vasser Sullivan	GTD	12	Lexus RC F GT3	Toyota 2UR-GSE 5.4 L V8	(United States) Townsend Bell (United States) Robert Megennis (United States) Frankie Montecalvo (United States) Zach Veach	DAY; 13	SEB; 6	MDO; 2	DET; 5	WGL; 11	WGL; 2	LIM; 10	ELK; 6	LGA; 10	LBH; 13	VIR; 13	ATL; 3	8th	2538
2021	(United States) Vasser Sullivan	GTD	14	Lexus RC F GT3	Toyota 2UR-GSE 5.4 L V8	(United Kingdom) Oliver Gavin (United Kingdom) Jack Hawksworth (United States) Kyle Kirkwood (United States) Aaron Telitz	DAY; 16	SEB; 7	MDO; 13	DET; 4†	WGL; 6	WGL; 1†	LIM; 3	ELK; 5	LGA; 6	LBH; 4	VIR; 3	ATL; 15	7th	2640
2022	(United States) VasserSullivan	GTD	12	Lexus RC F GT3	Toyota 2UR-GSE 5.4 L V8	(Australia) Scott Andrews (United States) Townsend Bell (United States) Richard Heistand (United States) Frankie Montecalvo (United States) Aaron Telitz	DAY; 15	SEB; 7	LBH; 3	LGA; 8	MDO; 3	DET; 4	WGL; 16	MOS; 6	LIM; 8	ELK; 3	VIR; 4	ATL; 13	8th	2602
2022	(United States) VasserSullivan	GTD Pro	14	Lexus RC F GT3	Toyota 2UR-GSE 5.4 L V8	(United Kingdom) Ben Barnicoat (United Kingdom) Jack Hawksworth (United States) Kyle Kirkwood (Japan) Kamui Kobayashi (United States) Aaron Telitz	DAY; 4	SEB; 7	LBH; 2	LGA; 2	MDO	DET	WGL; 4	MOS; 5	LIM; 3	ELK; 1	VIR; 3	ATL; 1	2nd	3277
2022	(United States) VasserSullivan	GTD	17	Lexus RC F GT3	Toyota 2UR-GSE 5.4 L V8	(United Kingdom) Ben Barnicoat (United Kingdom) Jack Hawksworth (United States) Richard Heistand (United States) Kyle Kirkwood	DAY	SEB	LBH	LGA	MDO; 7	DET; 1	WGL	MOS	LIM	ELK	VIR	ATL	18th	649
2023	(United States) Vasser Sullivan	GTD	12	Lexus RC F GT3	Toyota 2UR-GSE 5.4 L V8	(United States) Kyle Kirkwood (United States) Frankie Montecalvo (United States) Aaron Telitz (Canada) Parker Thompson	DAY; 5	SEB; 5	LBH; 3	LGA; 12	WGL; 1	MOS; 6	LIM; 12	ELK; 5	VIR; 5	IMS; 14	ATL; 12		3rd	2927
2023	(United States) Vasser Sullivan	GTD Pro	14	Lexus RC F GT3	Toyota 2UR-GSE 5.4 L V8	(United Kingdom) Ben Barnicoat (United Kingdom) Mike Conway (United Kingdom) Jack Hawksworth (United States) Kyle Kirkwood	DAY; 3	SEB; 2	LBH; 1	LGA; 2	WGL; 1	MOS; 4	LIM; 2	ELK; 2	VIR; 2	IMS; 3	ATL; 8		1st	3760
2024	(United States) Vasser Sullivan	GTD	12	Lexus RC F GT3	Toyota 2UR-GSE 5.4 L V8	(Japan) Ritomo Miyata (United States) Frankie Montecalvo (United States) Aaron Telitz (Canada) Parker Thompson	DAY; 15	SEB; 13	LBH; 15	LGA; 9	WGL; 4	MOS; 5	ELK; 11	VIR; 10	IMS; 22	ATL; 3			6th	2334
2024	(United States) Vasser Sullivan	GTD Pro	14	Lexus RC F GT3	Toyota 2UR-GSE 5.4 L V8	(United Kingdom) Ben Barnicoat (United Kingdom) Mike Conway (United Kingdom) Jack Hawksworth (United States) Kyle Kirkwood	DAY; 11	SEB; 1	LGA; 4	DET; 2	WGL; 4	MOS; 9	ELK; 9	VIR; 6	IMS; 4	ATL; 13			5th	2859
2024	(United States) Vasser Sullivan	GTD Pro	15	Lexus RC F GT3	Toyota 2UR-GSE 5.4 L V8	(United States) Frankie Montecalvo (Canada) Parker Thompson	DAY	SEB	LGA	DET; 4	WGL	MOS	ELK	VIR	IMS	ATL			16th	301
2024	(United States) Vasser Sullivan	GTD	89	Lexus RC F GT3	Toyota 2UR-GSE 5.4 L V8	(United Kingdom) Ben Barnicoat (Canada) Parker Thompson	DAY	SEB	LGA; 1	DET	WGL	MOS	ELK	VIR	IMS	ATL			22nd	385
2025	(United States) Vasser Sullivan Racing	GTD	12	Lexus RC F GT3	Toyota 2UR-GSE 5.4 L V8	(United Kingdom) Jack Hawksworth (United States) Kyle Kirkwood (United States) Frankie Montecalvo (Canada) Parker Thompson	DAY; 14	SEB; 2	LBH; 2	DET; 2	WGL; 11	MOS; 3	ELK; 11	VIR; 9	IMS; 9	ATL; 3			3rd	2851
2025	(United States) Vasser Sullivan Racing	GTD Pro	14	Lexus RC F GT3	Toyota 2UR-GSE 5.4 L V8	(United Kingdom) Ben Barnicoat (United States) Townsend Bell (United Kingdom) Jack Hawksworth (Germany) Marvin Kirchhöfer (United States) Kyle Kirkwood (Argentina) José María López (United States) Aaron Telitz	DAY; 11	SEB; 11	LGA; 7	DET; 4	WGL; 8	MOS; 8	ELK; 9	VIR; 8	IMS; 5	ATL; 6			10th	2577
2025	(United States) Vasser Sullivan Racing	GTD Pro	15	Lexus RC F GT3	Toyota 2UR-GSE 5.4 L V8	(United States) Frankie Montecalvo (Canada) Parker Thompson	DAY	SEB	LGA	DET; 9	WGL	MOS	ELK	VIR	IMS	ATL			15th	242
2025	(United States) Vasser Sullivan Racing	GTD	89	Lexus RC F GT3	Toyota 2UR-GSE 5.4 L V8	(United States) Frankie Montecalvo (United States) Aaron Telitz	DAY	SEB	LBH; 3	LGA	WGL	MOS	ELK	VIR	IMS	ATL			23rd	325
2026	(United States) Vasser Sullivan Racing	GTD	12	Lexus RC F GT3	Toyota 2UR-GSE 5.4 L V8	(France) Esteban Masson (United States) Frankie Montecalvo (Denmark) Benjamin Pedersen (United States) Aaron Telitz	DAY; 9	SEB	LBH	LGA	DET	WGL	ELK	IMS	ATL				10th*	230*
2026	(United States) Vasser Sullivan Racing	GTD Pro	14	Lexus RC F GT3	Toyota 2UR-GSE 5.4 L V8	(United Kingdom) Ben Barnicoat (United Kingdom) Jack Hawksworth (United States) Kyle Kirkwood	DAY; 10	SEB	LBH	LGA	DET	WGL	ELK	IMS	ATL				10th*	237*

^{†} Points only counted towards the WeatherTech Sprint Cup and not the overall GTD championship.

^{*} Season still in progress.
