= Balance of performance =

Mechanism to make parity between cars in auto racing

In sports car racing, balance of performance (BoP) is a regulation and mechanism that maintains parity between competing vehicles by adjusting the limits and parameters of a vehicle such as horsepower, weight, engine management, and aerodynamics to prevent a single manufacturer from becoming dominant in a racing class or series.

== History ==
The origin of the term "balance of performance" dates back to the creation of Group GT3 in 2005 for the 2006 racing season, using experience learned from the homologation special phenomenon in previous GT classes. The Japanese Super GT Racing series use of a different regulation called success ballast, which only affects the weight of a competing car. The aim of this system is to allow the development of various racing models within a class, without leading to an expensive development arms race between manufacturers. The system was later adopted for other production-based racing categories such as Group GT4, LM GTE and TCR Touring Cars. Since 2025, the British Touring Car Championship uses TTB (TOCA Turbo Boost) regulation, which only affects the turbo boost (power output) of a competing cars to achieve a similar outcome. Although one-make, open-wheel and prototype car racing typically do not use a balance of performance regulation, a similar system was devised for the LMP1 class in the FIA World Endurance Championship called equivalence of technology (abbreviated EoT), that allows for parity between hybrid and non-hybrid cars in the class. DPi cars in the IMSA WeatherTech SportsCar Championship are also subject to balance of performance regulations.

== Mechanism ==
Balance of performance is assigned by testing and analysis of a certain model's performance through previous races, and in some cases between sessions in the same race weekend. Alternate methods may be used if the competing vehicle is new. For example, for GT3 cars, SRO holds two balance of performance tests every year at Circuit Paul Ricard, with cars driven by racing drivers who already compete in them, in order to assess the performance of each car, and balance the performance of the vehicles accordingly. These cars are equipped with an organizer-supplied telemetry device so that the organizer can gather data to allow the balancing of the cars, with new-to-class cars also subject to wind tunnel and dynometer testing. Once the results are obtained, various aspects of the car that can affect the car's performance such as engine power, vehicle weight, and aerodynamics are adjusted. By analyzing performance patterns of each car, organizers can change the balance of performance of a car at any point during the season. Different series or organizers may calculate BoP differently depending on the conditions, with IMSA and ACO applying different BoP calculations for LM GTE cars in their respective series. The BoP for GT3 cars participating in Super GT's GT300 class are optimized to allow competition against cars built exclusively for the series. TCR has a unique feature called compensation weight, as a further mechanism to balance the cars.

Some manufacturers have been accused of sandbagging, where a car would purposely underperform during a test, or during certain races, to receive favorable results later; for example, rival teams accused the Ford GT (run by Chip Ganassi Racing) of sandbagging during the 2016 FIA World Endurance Championship season, even after performance adjustments for the qualifying session for the 2016 24 Hours of Le Mans race. Various rules have been made to deter this; IMSA mandated any car that is found to be sandbagging during the Roar Before the 24 (a testing session leading to the 24 Hours of Daytona race) will serve a five-minute stop-and-go penalty during the race.

Several racing games, such as Gran Turismo Sport, Gran Turismo 7, RaceRoom and Assetto Corsa Competizione, also feature a simulated balance of performance for each playable car as part of the games' game balance mechanism.
