= 2022 IMSA SportsCar Championship =

52nd season of the racing series organized by IMSA

The 2022 IMSA SportsCar Championship (known for sponsorship reasons as the 2022 IMSA WeatherTech SportsCar Championship) was the 52nd racing season sanctioned by the International Motor Sports Association (IMSA), which traces its lineage back to the 1971 IMSA GT Championship. This was also the ninth season of the IMSA SportsCar Championship since the merger between the American Le Mans Series and the Rolex Sports Car Series in 2014, and the seventh under the sponsorship of WeatherTech. The series began on January 27 for the 24 Hours of Daytona, and ended on October 1 with the Petit Le Mans after 12 races.

== Classes ==
- Daytona Prototype international (DPi)
- Le Mans Prototype 2 (LMP2)
- Le Mans Prototype 3 (LMP3)
- GT Daytona Pro (GTD Pro)
- GT Daytona (GTD)

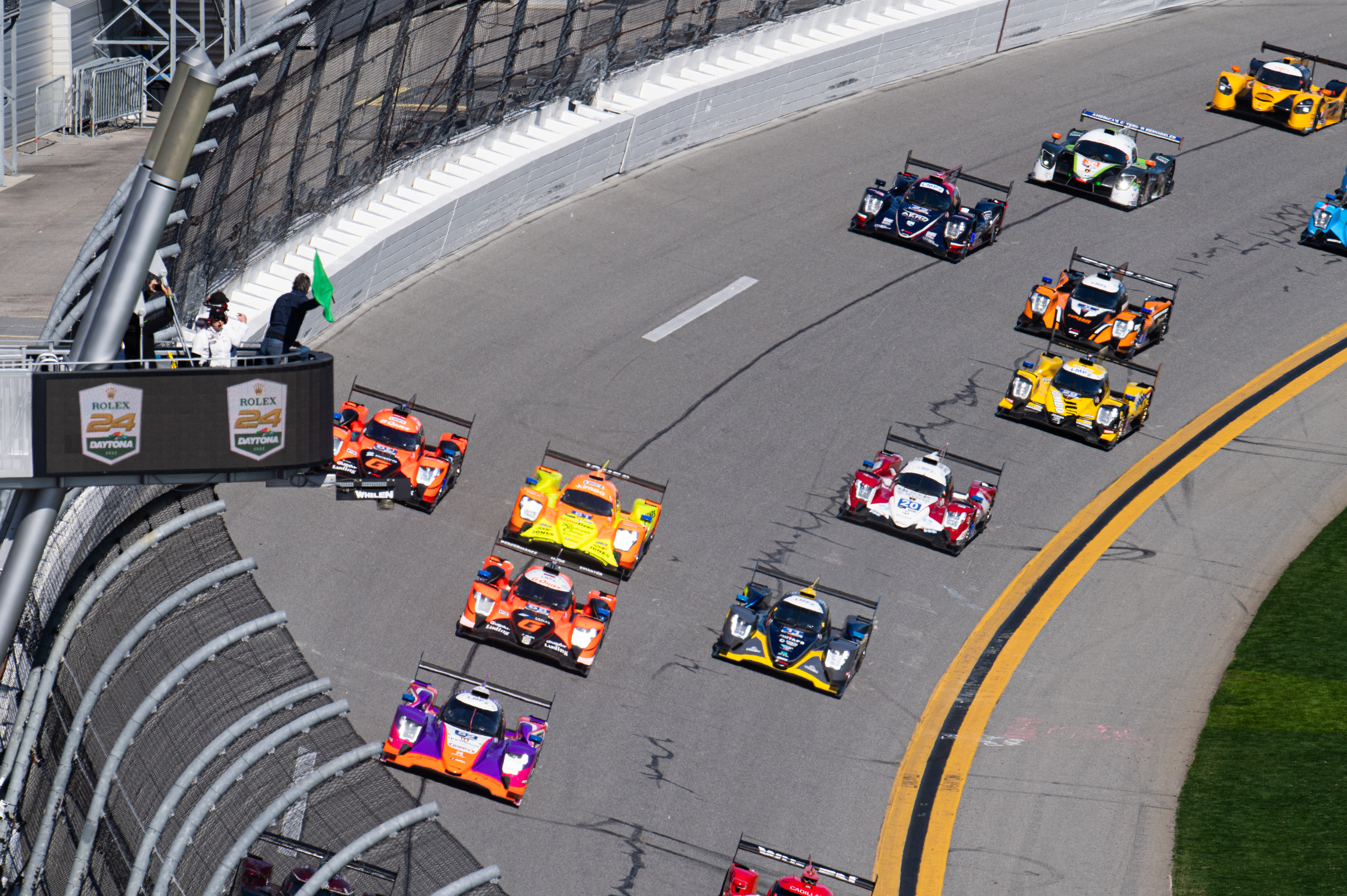
LMP2 during the 2022 24 Hours of Daytona

For the 2022 season, the GT Le Mans (GTLM) class was retired, following dwindling interest in the midst of the withdrawal of the Ford GT program operated by Chip Ganassi Racing, and the Porsche 911 program run by CORE Autosport in 2019 and 2020 respectively. GT Daytona was thus split into a new all-pro class (GTD Pro) as a replacement for the GTLM class, aligning its technical regulations with that of the pre-existing regular GTD class.

After six seasons of leading the class hierarchy in the IMSA SportsCar Championship, the DPi class has entered its final season of competition, with the arrival of the converged "Grand Touring Prototype" (GTP) class confirmed for the 2023 season (LMDh and LMH). This class has brought the flagship class of the IMSA SportsCar Championship to a common ground with the 24 Hours of Le Mans race, something not seen in IMSA competition for over a decade.

== Schedule ==
The schedule was released on August 6, 2021, and featured 12 rounds.

Race is part of the Michelin Endurance Cup
Race is part of the WeatherTech Sprint Cup

Rnd.	Race	Length	Classes	Circuit	Location	Date
QR	Motul Pole Award 100	1 hour, 40 minutes	All (Note: Race awarded qualifying points and set the starting lineup for the Rolex 24 at Daytona only.)	Daytona International Speedway	Daytona Beach, Florida	January 23
1	Rolex 24 at Daytona	24 hours	All (Note: The LMP2 and LMP3 class only scored points towards the Michelin Endurance Cup.)	Daytona International Speedway	Daytona Beach, Florida	January 29–30
2	Mobil 1 Twelve Hours of Sebring	12 hours	All	Sebring International Raceway	Sebring, Florida	March 19
3	Acura Grand Prix of Long Beach	1 hour, 40 minutes	DPi, GTD Pro, GTD (Note: The GTD class only scored points towards the WeatherTech Sprint Cup.)	Long Beach Street Circuit	Long Beach, California	April 9
4	Hyundai Monterey Sports Car Championship	2 hours, 40 minutes	DPi, LMP2, GTD Pro, GTD	WeatherTech Raceway Laguna Seca	Monterey, California	May 1
5	Lexus Grand Prix at Mid-Ohio	2 hours, 40 minutes	DPi, LMP2, LMP3, GTD	Mid-Ohio Sports Car Course	Lexington, Ohio	May 15
6	Detroit Grand Prix	1 hour, 40 minutes	DPi, GTD	The Raceway on Belle Isle	Detroit, Michigan	June 4
7	Sahlen's Six Hours of The Glen	6 hours	All	Watkins Glen International	Watkins Glen, New York	June 26
8	Chevrolet Grand Prix	2 hours, 40 minutes	DPi, LMP3, GTD Pro, GTD	Canadian Tire Motorsport Park	Bowmanville, Ontario	July 3
9	FCP Euro Northeast Grand Prix	2 hours, 40 minutes	GTD Pro, GTD	Lime Rock Park	Lakeville, Connecticut	July 16
10	IMSA Fastlane SportsCar Weekend	2 hours, 40 minutes	All	Road America	Elkhart Lake, Wisconsin	August 7
11	Michelin GT Challenge at VIR	2 hours, 40 minutes	GTD Pro, GTD	Virginia International Raceway	Alton, Virginia	August 28
12	Motul Petit Le Mans	10 hours	All	Michelin Raceway Road Atlanta	Braselton, Georgia	October 1

== Entries ==
=== Daytona Prototype International (DPi) ===
Team	Chassis	Engine	No.	Drivers	Rounds
(United States) Cadillac Racing	Cadillac DPi-V.R	Cadillac LT4 5.5 L V8	01	(France) Sébastien Bourdais	All
(United States) Cadillac Racing	Cadillac DPi-V.R	Cadillac LT4 5.5 L V8	01	(Netherlands) Renger van der Zande	All
(United States) Cadillac Racing	Cadillac DPi-V.R	Cadillac LT4 5.5 L V8	01	(New Zealand) Scott Dixon	1, 12
(United States) Cadillac Racing	Cadillac DPi-V.R	Cadillac LT4 5.5 L V8	01	(Spain) Álex Palou	1
(United States) Cadillac Racing	Cadillac DPi-V.R	Cadillac LT4 5.5 L V8	01	(United States) Ryan Hunter-Reay	2
(United States) Cadillac Racing	Cadillac DPi-V.R	Cadillac LT4 5.5 L V8	02	(New Zealand) Earl Bamber	All
(United States) Cadillac Racing	Cadillac DPi-V.R	Cadillac LT4 5.5 L V8	02	(United Kingdom) Alex Lynn	All
(United States) Cadillac Racing	Cadillac DPi-V.R	Cadillac LT4 5.5 L V8	02	(Denmark) Kevin Magnussen	1
(United States) Cadillac Racing	Cadillac DPi-V.R	Cadillac LT4 5.5 L V8	02	(Sweden) Marcus Ericsson	1
(United States) Cadillac Racing	Cadillac DPi-V.R	Cadillac LT4 5.5 L V8	02	(Switzerland) Neel Jani	2
(United States) Cadillac Racing	Cadillac DPi-V.R	Cadillac LT4 5.5 L V8	02	(United States) Ryan Hunter-Reay	12
(United States) JDC-Miller MotorSports	Cadillac DPi-V.R	Cadillac LT4 5.5 L V8	5	(France) Tristan Vautier	All
(United States) JDC-Miller MotorSports	Cadillac DPi-V.R	Cadillac LT4 5.5 L V8	5	(United Kingdom) Richard Westbrook	All
(United States) JDC-Miller MotorSports	Cadillac DPi-V.R	Cadillac LT4 5.5 L V8	5	(France) Loïc Duval	1–2, 7, 12
(United States) JDC-Miller MotorSports	Cadillac DPi-V.R	Cadillac LT4 5.5 L V8	5	(United States) Ben Keating	1
(United States) WTR - Konica Minolta Acura	Acura ARX-05	Acura AR35TT 3.5 L Turbo V6	10	(Portugal) Filipe Albuquerque	All
(United States) WTR - Konica Minolta Acura	Acura ARX-05	Acura AR35TT 3.5 L Turbo V6	10	(United States) Ricky Taylor	All
(United States) WTR - Konica Minolta Acura	Acura ARX-05	Acura AR35TT 3.5 L Turbo V6	10	(United Kingdom) Will Stevens	1–2
(United States) WTR - Konica Minolta Acura	Acura ARX-05	Acura AR35TT 3.5 L Turbo V6	10	(United States) Alexander Rossi	1
(United States) WTR - Konica Minolta Acura	Acura ARX-05	Acura AR35TT 3.5 L Turbo V6	10	(New Zealand) Brendon Hartley	12
(United States) Whelen Engineering Racing	Cadillac DPi-V.R	Cadillac LT4 5.5 L V8	31	(Brazil) Pipo Derani	All
(United States) Whelen Engineering Racing	Cadillac DPi-V.R	Cadillac LT4 5.5 L V8	31	(United States) Tristan Nunez	1–5
(United States) Whelen Engineering Racing	Cadillac DPi-V.R	Cadillac LT4 5.5 L V8	31	(France) Olivier Pla	6–8, 10, 12
(United States) Whelen Engineering Racing	Cadillac DPi-V.R	Cadillac LT4 5.5 L V8	31	(United Kingdom) Mike Conway	1–2, 7, 12
(United States) Ally Cadillac Racing	Cadillac DPi-V.R	Cadillac LT4 5.5 L V8	48	(Japan) Kamui Kobayashi	1–2, 7, 12
(United States) Ally Cadillac Racing	Cadillac DPi-V.R	Cadillac LT4 5.5 L V8	48	(Germany) Mike Rockenfeller	1–2, 7, 12
(United States) Ally Cadillac Racing	Cadillac DPi-V.R	Cadillac LT4 5.5 L V8	48	(United States) Jimmie Johnson	1, 7, 12
(United States) Ally Cadillac Racing	Cadillac DPi-V.R	Cadillac LT4 5.5 L V8	48	(Argentina) José María López	1–2
(United States) Meyer Shank Racing with Curb-Agajanian	Acura ARX-05	Acura AR35TT 3.5 L Turbo V6	60	(United Kingdom) Tom Blomqvist	All
(United States) Meyer Shank Racing with Curb-Agajanian	Acura ARX-05	Acura AR35TT 3.5 L Turbo V6	60	(United Kingdom) Oliver Jarvis	All
(United States) Meyer Shank Racing with Curb-Agajanian	Acura ARX-05	Acura AR35TT 3.5 L Turbo V6	60	(Brazil) Hélio Castroneves	1, 12
(United States) Meyer Shank Racing with Curb-Agajanian	Acura ARX-05	Acura AR35TT 3.5 L Turbo V6	60	(France) Simon Pagenaud	1
(United States) Meyer Shank Racing with Curb-Agajanian	Acura ARX-05	Acura AR35TT 3.5 L Turbo V6	60	(Belgium) Stoffel Vandoorne	2

=== Le Mans Prototype 2 (LMP2) ===
In accordance with the 2017 LMP2 regulations, all cars in the LMP2 class use the Gibson GK428 V8 engine.

Team	Chassis	No.	Drivers	Rounds
(Canada) Tower Motorsport	Oreca 07	8	(Canada) John Farano	All
(Canada) Tower Motorsport	Oreca 07	8	(Switzerland) Louis Delétraz	1–2, 4, 7, 10, 12
(Canada) Tower Motorsport	Oreca 07	8	(Portugal) Rui Andrade	1–2, 7, 12
(Canada) Tower Motorsport	Oreca 07	8	(Austria) Ferdinand Habsburg-Lothringen	1
(Canada) Tower Motorsport	Oreca 07	8	(United Kingdom) Will Stevens	5
(United States) PR1/Mathiasen Motorsports	Oreca 07	11	(United States) Steven Thomas	All
(United States) PR1/Mathiasen Motorsports	Oreca 07	11	(United States) Jonathan Bomarito	1–2, 4–5, 7
(United States) PR1/Mathiasen Motorsports	Oreca 07	11	(United States) Josh Pierson	1–2, 7, 12
(United States) PR1/Mathiasen Motorsports	Oreca 07	11	(United Kingdom) Harry Tincknell	1
(United States) PR1/Mathiasen Motorsports	Oreca 07	11	(United States) Tristan Nunez	10, 12
(United States) PR1/Mathiasen Motorsports	Oreca 07	52	(United States) Scott Huffaker	1–2, 7, 12
(United States) PR1/Mathiasen Motorsports	Oreca 07	52	(Denmark) Mikkel Jensen	1–2, 7, 12
(United States) PR1/Mathiasen Motorsports	Oreca 07	52	(United States) Ben Keating	1–2, 7, 12
(United States) PR1/Mathiasen Motorsports	Oreca 07	52	(France) Nicolas Lapierre	1
(United States) PR1/Mathiasen Motorsports	Oreca 07	52	(United States) Patrick Kelly	4–5, 10
(United States) PR1/Mathiasen Motorsports	Oreca 07	52	(United States) Josh Pierson	4–5, 10
(United States) Era Motorsport	Oreca 07	18	(United Kingdom) Ryan Dalziel	All
(United States) Era Motorsport	Oreca 07	18	(United States) Dwight Merriman	All
(United States) Era Motorsport	Oreca 07	18	(United Kingdom) Kyle Tilley	1–2, 7
(United States) Era Motorsport	Oreca 07	18	(France) Paul-Loup Chatin	1
(United States) Era Motorsport	Oreca 07	18	(Denmark) Christian Rasmussen	12
(Denmark) High Class Racing	Oreca 07	20	(Denmark) Dennis Andersen	All
(Denmark) High Class Racing	Oreca 07	20	(Denmark) Anders Fjordbach	1–2, 4–5, 7, 12
(Denmark) High Class Racing	Oreca 07	20	(Switzerland) Fabio Scherer	1–2, 7, 10, 12
(Denmark) High Class Racing	Oreca 07	20	(Switzerland) Nico Müller	1
(United Kingdom) United Autosports	Oreca 07	22	(United States) James McGuire	1–2
(United Kingdom) United Autosports	Oreca 07	22	(United Kingdom) Guy Smith	1–2
(United Kingdom) United Autosports	Oreca 07	22	(United Kingdom) Phil Hanson	1
(United Kingdom) United Autosports	Oreca 07	22	(United States) Will Owen	1
(United Kingdom) United Autosports	Oreca 07	22	(United Kingdom) Duncan Tappy	2
(Netherlands) Racing Team Nederland	Oreca 07	29	(Netherlands) Frits van Eerd	1–2, 7
(Netherlands) Racing Team Nederland	Oreca 07	29	(Netherlands) Giedo van der Garde	1–2, 7
(Netherlands) Racing Team Nederland	Oreca 07	29	(United States) Dylan Murry	1–2, 7
(Netherlands) Racing Team Nederland	Oreca 07	29	(Netherlands) Rinus VeeKay	1
(Russia) G-Drive Racing by APR	Oreca 07	68	(France) François Hériau	1
(Russia) G-Drive Racing by APR	Oreca 07	68	(United Arab Emirates) Ed Jones	1
(Russia) G-Drive Racing by APR	Oreca 07	68	(Denmark) Oliver Rasmussen	1
(Russia) G-Drive Racing by APR	Oreca 07	68	(Germany) René Rast	1
(Russia) G-Drive Racing by APR	Oreca 07	69	(Australia) James Allen	1
(Russia) G-Drive Racing by APR	Oreca 07	69	(United States) John Falb	1
(Russia) G-Drive Racing by APR	Oreca 07	69	(Italy) Luca Ghiotto	1
(Russia) G-Drive Racing by APR	Oreca 07	69	(Netherlands) Tijmen van der Helm	1
(United States) DragonSpeed USA	Oreca 07	81	(Canada) Devlin DeFrancesco	1
(United States) DragonSpeed USA	Oreca 07	81	(United States) Colton Herta	1
(United States) DragonSpeed USA	Oreca 07	81	(United States) Eric Lux	1
(United States) DragonSpeed USA	Oreca 07	81	(Mexico) Pato O'Ward	1
(United States) DragonSpeed - 10 Star	Oreca 07	81	(Sweden) Henrik Hedman	2, 4–5, 7, 10, 12
(United States) DragonSpeed - 10 Star	Oreca 07	81	(Colombia) Juan Pablo Montoya	2, 4–5, 7, 10, 12
(United States) DragonSpeed - 10 Star	Oreca 07	81	(Colombia) Sebastián Montoya	2, 7, 12

=== Le Mans Prototype 3 (LMP3) ===
In accordance with the 2020 LMP3 regulations, all cars in the LMP3 class use the Nissan VK56DE 5.6L V8 engine.

Team	Chassis	No.	Drivers	Rounds
(Belgium) Mühlner Motorsports America	Duqueine M30 - D08	6	(Dominican Republic) Efrin Castro	1
(Belgium) Mühlner Motorsports America	Duqueine M30 - D08	6	(Germany) Moritz Kranz	1
(Belgium) Mühlner Motorsports America	Duqueine M30 - D08	6	(United States) Joel Miller	1
(Belgium) Mühlner Motorsports America	Duqueine M30 - D08	6	(United States) Ayrton Ori	1
(Belgium) Mühlner Motorsports America	Duqueine M30 - D08	6	(Belgium) Ugo de Wilde	2, 7
(Belgium) Mühlner Motorsports America	Duqueine M30 - D08	6	(United States) Alec Udell	2
(Belgium) Mühlner Motorsports America	Duqueine M30 - D08	6	(United States) Harry Gottsacker	2
(Belgium) Mühlner Motorsports America	Duqueine M30 - D08	6	(Costa Rica) Danny Formal	7
(Belgium) Mühlner Motorsports America	Duqueine M30 - D08	6	(United States) Dillon Machavern	7
(Belgium) Mühlner Motorsports America	Duqueine M30 - D08	26	(United States) Charles Crews	1
(Belgium) Mühlner Motorsports America	Duqueine M30 - D08	26	(Australia) Cameron Shields	1
(Belgium) Mühlner Motorsports America	Duqueine M30 - D08	26	(United States) Nolan Siegel	1
(Belgium) Mühlner Motorsports America	Duqueine M30 - D08	26	(Belgium) Ugo de Wilde	1
(United States) Forty7 Motorsports	Duqueine M30 - D08	7	(United States) Mark Kvamme	1–2
(United States) Forty7 Motorsports	Duqueine M30 - D08	7	(United States) Trenton Estep	1
(United States) Forty7 Motorsports	Duqueine M30 - D08	7	(France) Antoine Doquin	1
(United States) Forty7 Motorsports	Duqueine M30 - D08	7	(United States) Austin McCusker	1
(United States) Forty7 Motorsports	Duqueine M30 - D08	7	(United Kingdom) Matthew Bell	2, 7
(United States) Forty7 Motorsports	Duqueine M30 - D08	7	(Canada) Anthony Mantella	2, 7
(United States) Forty7 Motorsports	Duqueine M30 - D08	7	(United Kingdom) Wayne Boyd	7
(Canada) AWA	Duqueine M30 - D08	13	(Canada) Orey Fidani	All
(Canada) AWA	Duqueine M30 - D08	13	(Canada) Kuno Wittmer	1–2, 5
(Canada) AWA	Duqueine M30 - D08	13	(Germany) Lars Kern	1–2, 7, 12
(Canada) AWA	Duqueine M30 - D08	13	(United Kingdom) Matthew Bell	1, 10, 12
(Canada) AWA	Duqueine M30 - D08	13	(Canada) Kyle Marcelli	7–8
(Canada) AWA	Duqueine M30 - D08	76	(Canada) Kyle Marcelli	12
(Canada) AWA	Duqueine M30 - D08	76	(Canada) Anthony Mantella	12
(Canada) AWA	Duqueine M30 - D08	76	(United States) Josh Sarchet	12
(United States) Jr III Motorsports	Ligier JS P320	30	(United States) Ari Balogh	2, 5, 7–8, 10, 12
(United States) Jr III Motorsports	Ligier JS P320	30	(Canada) Garett Grist	2, 5, 7–8, 10, 12
(United States) Jr III Motorsports	Ligier JS P320	30	(United States) Dakota Dickerson	2
(United States) Jr III Motorsports	Ligier JS P320	30	(United States) Nolan Siegel	7, 12
(United States) Sean Creech Motorsport	Ligier JS P320	33	(Portugal) João Barbosa	All
(United States) Sean Creech Motorsport	Ligier JS P320	33	(United States) Lance Willsey	1–2, 5, 7–8
(United States) Sean Creech Motorsport	Ligier JS P320	33	(Denmark) Malthe Jakobsen	1–2, 7, 10, 12
(United States) Sean Creech Motorsport	Ligier JS P320	33	(Guernsey) Sebastian Priaulx	1
(United States) Sean Creech Motorsport	Ligier JS P320	33	(Chile) Nico Pino	12
(United States) Andretti Autosport	Ligier JS P320	36	(United States) Jarett Andretti	All
(United States) Andretti Autosport	Ligier JS P320	36	(Colombia) Gabby Chaves	All
(United States) Andretti Autosport	Ligier JS P320	36	(Australia) Josh Burdon	1–2, 7, 12
(United States) Andretti Autosport	Ligier JS P320	36	(Sweden) Rasmus Lindh	1
(United States) Performance Tech Motorsports	Ligier JS P320	38	(United States) Dan Goldburg	1–2, 5, 7, 12
(United States) Performance Tech Motorsports	Ligier JS P320	38	(Japan) Hikaru Abe	1
(United States) Performance Tech Motorsports	Ligier JS P320	38	(Canada) Garett Grist	1
(United States) Performance Tech Motorsports	Ligier JS P320	38	(Chile) Nico Pino	1
(United States) Performance Tech Motorsports	Ligier JS P320	38	(Sweden) Rasmus Lindh	2, 5, 7
(United States) Performance Tech Motorsports	Ligier JS P320	38	(Australia) Cameron Shields	2, 7, 10, 12
(United States) Performance Tech Motorsports	Ligier JS P320	38	(United States) James French	10
(United States) Performance Tech Motorsports	Ligier JS P320	38	(United States) Tyler Maxson	12
(United States) FastMD Racing	Duqueine M30 - D08	40	(United States) Max Hanratty	2, 7
(United States) FastMD Racing	Duqueine M30 - D08	40	(Canada) James Vance	2, 7
(United States) FastMD Racing	Duqueine M30 - D08	40	(United States) Todd Archer	2
(United States) FastMD Racing	Duqueine M30 - D08	40	(Argentina) Nicolás Varrone	7
(United States) CORE Autosport	Ligier JS P320	54	(United States) Jon Bennett	All
(United States) CORE Autosport	Ligier JS P320	54	(United States) Colin Braun	All
(United States) CORE Autosport	Ligier JS P320	54	(United States) George Kurtz	1–2, 7, 12
(United States) CORE Autosport	Ligier JS P320	54	(Sweden) Niclas Jönsson	1
(United States) MLT Motorsports	Ligier JS P320	58	(United States) Dakota Dickerson	5, 7, 10
(United States) MLT Motorsports	Ligier JS P320	58	(United States) Josh Sarchet	5, 7, 10
(United States) MLT Motorsports	Ligier JS P320	58	(United States) Tyler Maxson	7
(United States) Riley Motorsports	Ligier JS P320	74	(United States) Gar Robinson	All
(United States) Riley Motorsports	Ligier JS P320	74	(Brazil) Felipe Fraga	1–2, 5, 7, 10, 12
(United States) Riley Motorsports	Ligier JS P320	74	(Netherlands) Kay van Berlo	1–2, 7, 12
(United States) Riley Motorsports	Ligier JS P320	74	(United States) Michael Cooper	1
(United States) Riley Motorsports	Ligier JS P320	74	(Australia) Scott Andrews	8
(United States) JDC-Miller MotorSports	Duqueine M30 - D08	90	(United States) Gerry Kraut	10
(United States) JDC-Miller MotorSports	Duqueine M30 - D08	90	(Australia) Scott Andrews	10

=== GT Daytona (GTD Pro / GTD) ===
Team	Chassis	Engine	No.	Drivers	Rounds
GTD Pro
(Hong Kong) KCMG	Porsche 911 GT3 R	Porsche M97/80 4.0 L Flat-6	2	(Switzerland) Alexandre Imperatori	1
(Hong Kong) KCMG	Porsche 911 GT3 R	Porsche M97/80 4.0 L Flat-6	2	(Norway) Dennis Olsen	1
(Hong Kong) KCMG	Porsche 911 GT3 R	Porsche M97/80 4.0 L Flat-6	2	(France) Patrick Pilet	1
(Hong Kong) KCMG	Porsche 911 GT3 R	Porsche M97/80 4.0 L Flat-6	2	(Belgium) Laurens Vanthoor	1
(United States) Corvette Racing	Chevrolet Corvette C8.R GTD	Chevrolet LT6.R 5.5 L V8	3	(Spain) Antonio García	All
(United States) Corvette Racing	Chevrolet Corvette C8.R GTD	Chevrolet LT6.R 5.5 L V8	3	(United States) Jordan Taylor	All
(United States) Corvette Racing	Chevrolet Corvette C8.R GTD	Chevrolet LT6.R 5.5 L V8	3	(Netherlands) Nicky Catsburg	1–2, 12
(United States) Corvette Racing	Chevrolet Corvette C8.R GTD	Chevrolet LT6.R 5.5 L V8	4	(United States) Tommy Milner	1
(United States) Corvette Racing	Chevrolet Corvette C8.R GTD	Chevrolet LT6.R 5.5 L V8	4	(Denmark) Marco Sørensen	1
(United States) Corvette Racing	Chevrolet Corvette C8.R GTD	Chevrolet LT6.R 5.5 L V8	4	(United Kingdom) Nick Tandy	1
(Canada) Pfaff Motorsports	Porsche 911 GT3 R	Porsche M97/80 4.0 L Flat-6	9	(Australia) Matt Campbell	All
(Canada) Pfaff Motorsports	Porsche 911 GT3 R	Porsche M97/80 4.0 L Flat-6	9	(France) Mathieu Jaminet	All
(Canada) Pfaff Motorsports	Porsche 911 GT3 R	Porsche M97/80 4.0 L Flat-6	9	(Brazil) Felipe Nasr	1–2, 12
(United States) VasserSullivan	Lexus RC F GT3	Lexus 2UR-GSE 5.4 L V8	14	(United Kingdom) Ben Barnicoat	All
(United States) VasserSullivan	Lexus RC F GT3	Lexus 2UR-GSE 5.4 L V8	14	(United Kingdom) Jack Hawksworth	1–4, 9–12
(United States) VasserSullivan	Lexus RC F GT3	Lexus 2UR-GSE 5.4 L V8	14	(United States) Kyle Kirkwood	1, 7, 12
(United States) VasserSullivan	Lexus RC F GT3	Lexus 2UR-GSE 5.4 L V8	14	(United States) Aaron Telitz	2
(United States) VasserSullivan	Lexus RC F GT3	Lexus 2UR-GSE 5.4 L V8	14	(Japan) Kamui Kobayashi	8
(Germany) (United States) / Proton USA (Note: Car No. 15 entered as Proton USA and car No. 79 and No. 97 entered as WeatherTech Racing.); (Germany) (United States) / WeatherTech Racing	Mercedes-AMG GT3 Evo	Mercedes-AMG M159 6.2 L V8	15	(Germany) Patrick Assenheimer	1
(Germany) (United States) / Proton USA; (Germany) (United States) / WeatherTech Racing	Mercedes-AMG GT3 Evo	Mercedes-AMG M159 6.2 L V8	15	(United States) Austin Cindric	1
(Germany) (United States) / Proton USA; (Germany) (United States) / WeatherTech Racing	Mercedes-AMG GT3 Evo	Mercedes-AMG M159 6.2 L V8	15	(Germany) Dirk Müller	1
(Germany) (United States) / Proton USA; (Germany) (United States) / WeatherTech Racing	Porsche 911 GT3 R	Porsche M97/80 4.0 L Flat-6	79	(France) Julien Andlauer	1–2
(Germany) (United States) / Proton USA; (Germany) (United States) / WeatherTech Racing	Porsche 911 GT3 R	Porsche M97/80 4.0 L Flat-6	79	(United States) Cooper MacNeil	1–2
(Germany) (United States) / Proton USA; (Germany) (United States) / WeatherTech Racing	Porsche 911 GT3 R	Porsche M97/80 4.0 L Flat-6	79	(Belgium) Alessio Picariello	1–2
(Germany) (United States) / Proton USA; (Germany) (United States) / WeatherTech Racing	Porsche 911 GT3 R	Porsche M97/80 4.0 L Flat-6	79	(Italy) Matteo Cairoli	1
(Germany) (United States) / Proton USA; (Germany) (United States) / WeatherTech Racing	Mercedes-AMG GT3 Evo	Mercedes-AMG M159 6.2 L V8	79	(United States) Cooper MacNeil	3–4, 7–8
(Germany) (United States) / Proton USA; (Germany) (United States) / WeatherTech Racing	Mercedes-AMG GT3 Evo	Mercedes-AMG M159 6.2 L V8	79	(Italy) Raffaele Marciello	3
(Germany) (United States) / Proton USA; (Germany) (United States) / WeatherTech Racing	Mercedes-AMG GT3 Evo	Mercedes-AMG M159 6.2 L V8	79	(Spain) Daniel Juncadella	4, 8
(Germany) (United States) / Proton USA; (Germany) (United States) / WeatherTech Racing	Mercedes-AMG GT3 Evo	Mercedes-AMG M159 6.2 L V8	79	(Canada) Mikaël Grenier	7, 12
(Germany) (United States) / Proton USA; (Germany) (United States) / WeatherTech Racing	Mercedes-AMG GT3 Evo	Mercedes-AMG M159 6.2 L V8	79	(Germany) Maro Engel	7
(Germany) (United States) / Proton USA; (Germany) (United States) / WeatherTech Racing	Mercedes-AMG GT3 Evo	Mercedes-AMG M159 6.2 L V8	79	(Germany) Maximilian Buhk	12
(Germany) (United States) / Proton USA; (Germany) (United States) / WeatherTech Racing	Mercedes-AMG GT3 Evo	Mercedes-AMG M159 6.2 L V8	79	(Germany) Maximilian Götz	12
(Germany) (United States) / Proton USA; (Germany) (United States) / WeatherTech Racing	Mercedes-AMG GT3 Evo	Mercedes-AMG M159 6.2 L V8	97	(Germany) Maro Engel	1–2
(Germany) (United States) / Proton USA; (Germany) (United States) / WeatherTech Racing	Mercedes-AMG GT3 Evo	Mercedes-AMG M159 6.2 L V8	97	(France) Jules Gounon	1–2
(Germany) (United States) / Proton USA; (Germany) (United States) / WeatherTech Racing	Mercedes-AMG GT3 Evo	Mercedes-AMG M159 6.2 L V8	97	(United States) Cooper MacNeil	1–2
(Germany) (United States) / Proton USA; (Germany) (United States) / WeatherTech Racing	Mercedes-AMG GT3 Evo	Mercedes-AMG M159 6.2 L V8	97	(Spain) Daniel Juncadella	1
(United States) Heart of Racing Team	Aston Martin Vantage AMR GT3	Aston Martin M177 4.0 L Turbo V8	23	(United Kingdom) Ross Gunn	All
(United States) Heart of Racing Team	Aston Martin Vantage AMR GT3	Aston Martin M177 4.0 L Turbo V8	23	(Spain) Alex Riberas	All
(United States) Heart of Racing Team	Aston Martin Vantage AMR GT3	Aston Martin M177 4.0 L Turbo V8	23	(Belgium) Maxime Martin	1–2
(United States) Heart of Racing Team	Aston Martin Vantage AMR GT3	Aston Martin M177 4.0 L Turbo V8	23	(United Kingdom) Tom Gamble	12
(United States) BMW M Team RLL	BMW M4 GT3	BMW P58 3.0 L Turbo I6	24	(Austria) Philipp Eng	1–2
(United States) BMW M Team RLL	BMW M4 GT3	BMW P58 3.0 L Turbo I6	24	(Germany) Marco Wittmann	1–2
(United States) BMW M Team RLL	BMW M4 GT3	BMW P58 3.0 L Turbo I6	24	(United Kingdom) Nick Yelloly	1–2
(United States) BMW M Team RLL	BMW M4 GT3	BMW P58 3.0 L Turbo I6	24	(South Africa) Sheldon van der Linde	1
(United States) BMW M Team RLL	BMW M4 GT3	BMW P58 3.0 L Turbo I6	25	(United States) John Edwards	All
(United States) BMW M Team RLL	BMW M4 GT3	BMW P58 3.0 L Turbo I6	25	(United States) Connor De Phillippi	All
(United States) BMW M Team RLL	BMW M4 GT3	BMW P58 3.0 L Turbo I6	25	(Brazil) Augusto Farfus	1–2, 7
(United States) BMW M Team RLL	BMW M4 GT3	BMW P58 3.0 L Turbo I6	25	(Finland) Jesse Krohn	1, 12
(United States) Risi Competizione	Ferrari 488 GT3 Evo 2020	Ferrari F154CB 3.9 L Turbo V8	62	(Italy) Davide Rigon	1–2, 7, 12
(United States) Risi Competizione	Ferrari 488 GT3 Evo 2020	Ferrari F154CB 3.9 L Turbo V8	62	(Brazil) Daniel Serra	1–2, 7, 12
(United States) Risi Competizione	Ferrari 488 GT3 Evo 2020	Ferrari F154CB 3.9 L Turbo V8	62	(United Kingdom) James Calado	1, 12
(United States) Risi Competizione	Ferrari 488 GT3 Evo 2020	Ferrari F154CB 3.9 L Turbo V8	62	(Italy) Alessandro Pier Guidi	1
(United States) Risi Competizione	Ferrari 488 GT3 Evo 2020	Ferrari F154CB 3.9 L Turbo V8	62	(Italy) Edward Cheever	2
(United States) TR3 Racing	Lamborghini Huracán GT3 Evo	Lamborghini DGF 5.2 L V10	63	(Italy) Mirko Bortolotti	1–2
(United States) TR3 Racing	Lamborghini Huracán GT3 Evo	Lamborghini DGF 5.2 L V10	63	(Italy) Andrea Caldarelli	1–2
(United States) TR3 Racing	Lamborghini Huracán GT3 Evo	Lamborghini DGF 5.2 L V10	63	(Italy) Marco Mapelli	1–2
(United States) TR3 Racing	Lamborghini Huracán GT3 Evo	Lamborghini DGF 5.2 L V10	63	(Switzerland) Rolf Ineichen	1
(United States) WTR - Racers Edge Motorsports	Acura NSX GT3 Evo22	Acura JNC1 3.5 L Turbo V6	93	(United States) Ashton Harrison	2
(United States) WTR - Racers Edge Motorsports	Acura NSX GT3 Evo22	Acura JNC1 3.5 L Turbo V6	93	(United States) Tom Long	2
(United States) WTR - Racers Edge Motorsports	Acura NSX GT3 Evo22	Acura JNC1 3.5 L Turbo V6	93	(Canada) Kyle Marcelli	2
GTD
(United States) Paul Miller Racing	BMW M4 GT3	BMW P58 3.0 L Turbo I6	1	(United States) Bryan Sellers	2–12
(United States) Paul Miller Racing	BMW M4 GT3	BMW P58 3.0 L Turbo I6	1	(United States) Madison Snow	2–12
(United States) Paul Miller Racing	BMW M4 GT3	BMW P58 3.0 L Turbo I6	1	(Sweden) Erik Johansson	2, 7, 12
(United States) VasserSullivan	Lexus RC F GT3	Lexus 2UR-GSE 5.4 L V8	12	(United States) Frankie Montecalvo	All
(United States) VasserSullivan	Lexus RC F GT3	Lexus 2UR-GSE 5.4 L V8	12	(United States) Richard Heistand	1–2, 7, 12
(United States) VasserSullivan	Lexus RC F GT3	Lexus 2UR-GSE 5.4 L V8	12	(United States) Aaron Telitz	1, 3–12
(United States) VasserSullivan	Lexus RC F GT3	Lexus 2UR-GSE 5.4 L V8	12	(United States) Townsend Bell	1
(United States) VasserSullivan	Lexus RC F GT3	Lexus 2UR-GSE 5.4 L V8	12	(Australia) Scott Andrews	2
(United States) VasserSullivan	Lexus RC F GT3	Lexus 2UR-GSE 5.4 L V8	17	(United Kingdom) Jack Hawksworth	5
(United States) VasserSullivan	Lexus RC F GT3	Lexus 2UR-GSE 5.4 L V8	17	(United States) Richard Heistand	5
(United States) VasserSullivan	Lexus RC F GT3	Lexus 2UR-GSE 5.4 L V8	17	(United Kingdom) Ben Barnicoat	6
(United States) VasserSullivan	Lexus RC F GT3	Lexus 2UR-GSE 5.4 L V8	17	(United States) Kyle Kirkwood	6
(United States) Wright Motorsports	Porsche 911 GT3 R	Porsche M97/80 4.0 L Flat-6	16	(United States) Ryan Hardwick	1–7, 9–12
(United States) Wright Motorsports	Porsche 911 GT3 R	Porsche M97/80 4.0 L Flat-6	16	(Belgium) Jan Heylen	1–7, 9–12
(United States) Wright Motorsports	Porsche 911 GT3 R	Porsche M97/80 4.0 L Flat-6	16	(Canada) Zacharie Robichon	1–2, 7, 12
(United States) Wright Motorsports	Porsche 911 GT3 R	Porsche M97/80 4.0 L Flat-6	16	(Austria) Richard Lietz	1
(United States) Team TGM	Porsche 911 GT3 R	Porsche M97/80 4.0 L Flat-6	64	(United States) Ted Giovanis	1
(United States) Team TGM	Porsche 911 GT3 R	Porsche M97/80 4.0 L Flat-6	64	(United States) Hugh Plumb	1
(United States) Team TGM	Porsche 911 GT3 R	Porsche M97/80 4.0 L Flat-6	64	(United States) Matt Plumb	1
(United States) Team TGM	Porsche 911 GT3 R	Porsche M97/80 4.0 L Flat-6	64	(United States) Owen Trinkler	1
(United States) TR3 Racing	Lamborghini Huracán GT3 Evo	Lamborghini DGF 5.2 L V10	19	(Italy) Giacomo Altoè	1
(United States) TR3 Racing	Lamborghini Huracán GT3 Evo	Lamborghini DGF 5.2 L V10	19	(United States) John Megrue	1
(United States) TR3 Racing	Lamborghini Huracán GT3 Evo	Lamborghini DGF 5.2 L V10	19	(United States) Jeff Segal	1
(United States) TR3 Racing	Lamborghini Huracán GT3 Evo	Lamborghini DGF 5.2 L V10	19	(United States) Bill Sweedler	1
(Italy) AF Corse	Ferrari 488 GT3 Evo 2020	Ferrari F154CB 3.9 L Turbo V8	21	(Argentina) Luís Pérez Companc	1–2, 7, 12
(Italy) AF Corse	Ferrari 488 GT3 Evo 2020	Ferrari F154CB 3.9 L Turbo V8	21	(United Kingdom) Simon Mann	1–2, 7, 12
(Italy) AF Corse	Ferrari 488 GT3 Evo 2020	Ferrari F154CB 3.9 L Turbo V8	21	(Finland) Toni Vilander	1–2, 7, 12
(Italy) AF Corse	Ferrari 488 GT3 Evo 2020	Ferrari F154CB 3.9 L Turbo V8	21	(Denmark) Nicklas Nielsen	1
(Italy) Cetilar Racing	Ferrari 488 GT3 Evo 2020	Ferrari F154CB 3.9 L Turbo V8	47	(Italy) Roberto Lacorte	1–2, 7, 12
(Italy) Cetilar Racing	Ferrari 488 GT3 Evo 2020	Ferrari F154CB 3.9 L Turbo V8	47	(Italy) Giorgio Sernagiotto	1–2, 7, 12
(Italy) Cetilar Racing	Ferrari 488 GT3 Evo 2020	Ferrari F154CB 3.9 L Turbo V8	47	(Italy) Antonio Fuoco	1–2, 7
(Italy) Cetilar Racing	Ferrari 488 GT3 Evo 2020	Ferrari F154CB 3.9 L Turbo V8	47	(Italy) Alessio Rovera	1
(Italy) Cetilar Racing	Ferrari 488 GT3 Evo 2020	Ferrari F154CB 3.9 L Turbo V8	47	(Belgium) Ulysse de Pauw	12
(United States) Heart of Racing Team	Aston Martin Vantage AMR GT3	Aston Martin M177 4.0 L Turbo V8	27	(Canada) Roman De Angelis	All
(United States) Heart of Racing Team	Aston Martin Vantage AMR GT3	Aston Martin M177 4.0 L Turbo V8	27	(United Kingdom) Ian James	1–2, 7, 12
(United States) Heart of Racing Team	Aston Martin Vantage AMR GT3	Aston Martin M177 4.0 L Turbo V8	27	(United Kingdom) Tom Gamble	1–2
(United States) Heart of Racing Team	Aston Martin Vantage AMR GT3	Aston Martin M177 4.0 L Turbo V8	27	(United Kingdom) Darren Turner	1
(United States) Heart of Racing Team	Aston Martin Vantage AMR GT3	Aston Martin M177 4.0 L Turbo V8	27	(Belgium) Maxime Martin	3–5, 7–12
(United States) Heart of Racing Team	Aston Martin Vantage AMR GT3	Aston Martin M177 4.0 L Turbo V8	27	(United Kingdom) Ross Gunn	6
(United States) Alegra Motorsports	Mercedes-AMG GT3 Evo	Mercedes-AMG M159 6.2 L V8	28	(Canada) Daniel Morad	1–2, 4
(United States) Alegra Motorsports	Mercedes-AMG GT3 Evo	Mercedes-AMG M159 6.2 L V8	28	(United States) Michael de Quesada	1–2, 4
(United States) Alegra Motorsports	Mercedes-AMG GT3 Evo	Mercedes-AMG M159 6.2 L V8	28	(Germany) Maximilian Götz	1–2
(United States) Alegra Motorsports	Mercedes-AMG GT3 Evo	Mercedes-AMG M159 6.2 L V8	28	(Sweden) Linus Lundqvist	1
(United States) / Gilbert Korthoff Motorsports (Note: Car entered as Gilbert Korthoff Motorsports at Rounds 1 to 2 and as Team Korthoff Motorsports from Round 3.); (United States) / Team Korthoff Motorsports	Mercedes-AMG GT3 Evo	Mercedes-AMG M159 6.2 L V8	32	(United Kingdom) Stevan McAleer	1–7, 9–12
(United States) / Gilbert Korthoff Motorsports; (United States) / Team Korthoff Motorsports	Mercedes-AMG GT3 Evo	Mercedes-AMG M159 6.2 L V8	32	(United States) Mike Skeen	1–3, 5–7, 9–12
(United States) / Gilbert Korthoff Motorsports; (United States) / Team Korthoff Motorsports	Mercedes-AMG GT3 Evo	Mercedes-AMG M159 6.2 L V8	32	(Australia) Scott Andrews	1
(United States) / Gilbert Korthoff Motorsports; (United States) / Team Korthoff Motorsports	Mercedes-AMG GT3 Evo	Mercedes-AMG M159 6.2 L V8	32	(Australia) James Davison	1
(United States) / Gilbert Korthoff Motorsports; (United States) / Team Korthoff Motorsports	Mercedes-AMG GT3 Evo	Mercedes-AMG M159 6.2 L V8	32	(Spain) Daniel Juncadella	2
(United States) / Gilbert Korthoff Motorsports; (United States) / Team Korthoff Motorsports	Mercedes-AMG GT3 Evo	Mercedes-AMG M159 6.2 L V8	32	(Germany) Dirk Müller	4, 7, 12
(United States) / Gilbert Korthoff Motorsports; (United States) / Team Korthoff Motorsports	Mercedes-AMG GT3 Evo	Mercedes-AMG M159 6.2 L V8	32	(United States) Guy Cosmo	QR^{†}
(United States) GMG Racing	Porsche 911 GT3 R	Porsche M97/80 4.0 L Flat-6	34	(United States) James Sofronas	1, 3–4
(United States) GMG Racing	Porsche 911 GT3 R	Porsche M97/80 4.0 L Flat-6	34	(United States) Kyle Washington	1, 3–4
(United States) GMG Racing	Porsche 911 GT3 R	Porsche M97/80 4.0 L Flat-6	34	(Austria) Klaus Bachler	1
(United States) GMG Racing	Porsche 911 GT3 R	Porsche M97/80 4.0 L Flat-6	34	(Netherlands) Jeroen Bleekemolen	1
(United States) CarBahn with Peregrine Racing	Lamborghini Huracán GT3 Evo	Lamborghini DGF 5.2 L V10	39	(United States) Robert Megennis	1–7, 9–12
(United States) CarBahn with Peregrine Racing	Lamborghini Huracán GT3 Evo	Lamborghini DGF 5.2 L V10	39	(United States) Jeff Westphal	1–7, 9–12
(United States) CarBahn with Peregrine Racing	Lamborghini Huracán GT3 Evo	Lamborghini DGF 5.2 L V10	39	(United States) Corey Lewis	1–2, 7, 12
(United States) CarBahn with Peregrine Racing	Lamborghini Huracán GT3 Evo	Lamborghini DGF 5.2 L V10	39	(United Kingdom) Sandy Mitchell	1
(United States) NTE Sport/SSR	Lamborghini Huracán GT3 Evo	Lamborghini DGF 5.2 L V10	42	(United States) Jaden Conwright	1–2, 4, 7, 10–12
(United States) NTE Sport/SSR	Lamborghini Huracán GT3 Evo	Lamborghini DGF 5.2 L V10	42	(United States) Don Yount	1–2, 7, 12
(United States) NTE Sport/SSR	Lamborghini Huracán GT3 Evo	Lamborghini DGF 5.2 L V10	42	(Chile) Benjamín Hites	1
(United States) NTE Sport/SSR	Lamborghini Huracán GT3 Evo	Lamborghini DGF 5.2 L V10	42	(Finland) Markus Palttala	1
(United States) NTE Sport/SSR	Lamborghini Huracán GT3 Evo	Lamborghini DGF 5.2 L V10	42	(Guatemala) Mateo Llarena	2
(United States) NTE Sport/SSR	Lamborghini Huracán GT3 Evo	Lamborghini DGF 5.2 L V10	42	(Germany) Marco Holzer	4, 7, 10–12
(United States) Magnus Racing	Aston Martin Vantage AMR GT3	Aston Martin M177 4.0 L Turbo V8	44	(United States) Andy Lally	1–2, 7, 11–12
(United States) Magnus Racing	Aston Martin Vantage AMR GT3	Aston Martin M177 4.0 L Turbo V8	44	(United States) John Potter	1–2, 7, 11–12
(United States) Magnus Racing	Aston Martin Vantage AMR GT3	Aston Martin M177 4.0 L Turbo V8	44	(United States) Spencer Pumpelly	1–2, 7, 12
(United States) Magnus Racing	Aston Martin Vantage AMR GT3	Aston Martin M177 4.0 L Turbo V8	44	(United Kingdom) Jonathan Adam	1
(United States) Rick Ware Racing	Acura NSX GT3 Evo22	Acura JNC1 3.5 L Turbo V6	51	(United States) Ryan Eversley	3–6, 8–11
(United States) Rick Ware Racing	Acura NSX GT3 Evo22	Acura JNC1 3.5 L Turbo V6	51	(Australia) Aidan Read	3–6, 8–11
(United States) Winward Racing	Mercedes-AMG GT3 Evo	Mercedes-AMG M159 6.2 L V8	57	(United Kingdom) Philip Ellis	All
(United States) Winward Racing	Mercedes-AMG GT3 Evo	Mercedes-AMG M159 6.2 L V8	57	(United States) Russell Ward	All
(United States) Winward Racing	Mercedes-AMG GT3 Evo	Mercedes-AMG M159 6.2 L V8	57	(Austria) Lucas Auer	1
(United States) Winward Racing	Mercedes-AMG GT3 Evo	Mercedes-AMG M159 6.2 L V8	57	(Canada) Mikaël Grenier	1
(United States) Winward Racing	Mercedes-AMG GT3 Evo	Mercedes-AMG M159 6.2 L V8	57	(Germany) Marvin Dienst	2, 7, 12
(United States) Crucial Motorsports	McLaren 720S GT3	McLaren M840T 4.0L Turbo V8	59	(United States) Paul Holton	1–3, 7
(United States) Crucial Motorsports	McLaren 720S GT3	McLaren M840T 4.0L Turbo V8	59	(United States) Jon Miller	1–3, 7
(United States) Crucial Motorsports	McLaren 720S GT3	McLaren M840T 4.0L Turbo V8	59	(United States) Patrick Gallagher	1–2, 7
(United States) Crucial Motorsports	McLaren 720S GT3	McLaren M840T 4.0L Turbo V8	59	(United States) Lance Bergstein	1
(United States) Gradient Racing	Acura NSX GT3 Evo22	Acura JNC1 3.5 L Turbo V6	66	(Germany) Mario Farnbacher	1–3, 7, 12
(United States) Gradient Racing	Acura NSX GT3 Evo22	Acura JNC1 3.5 L Turbo V6	66	(United Kingdom) Till Bechtolsheimer	1–2, 7, 12
(United States) Gradient Racing	Acura NSX GT3 Evo22	Acura JNC1 3.5 L Turbo V6	66	(Barbados) Kyffin Simpson	1–2, 7, 12
(United States) Gradient Racing	Acura NSX GT3 Evo22	Acura JNC1 3.5 L Turbo V6	66	(United States) Marc Miller	1, 3
(United Kingdom) Inception Racing with Optimum Motorsport	McLaren 720S GT3	McLaren M840T 4.0L Turbo V8	70	(United States) Brendan Iribe	1–5, 7, 12
(United Kingdom) Inception Racing with Optimum Motorsport	McLaren 720S GT3	McLaren M840T 4.0L Turbo V8	70	(South Africa) Jordan Pepper	1–2, 5, 7, 12
(United Kingdom) Inception Racing with Optimum Motorsport	McLaren 720S GT3	McLaren M840T 4.0L Turbo V8	70	(United Kingdom) Ollie Millroy	1–2, 7
(United Kingdom) Inception Racing with Optimum Motorsport	McLaren 720S GT3	McLaren M840T 4.0L Turbo V8	70	(Denmark) Frederik Schandorff	1, 3–4
(United Kingdom) Inception Racing with Optimum Motorsport	McLaren 720S GT3	McLaren M840T 4.0L Turbo V8	70	(Guernsey) Sebastian Priaulx	12
(Germany) T3 Motorsport North America	Lamborghini Huracán GT3 Evo	Lamborghini DGF 5.2 L V10	71	(Canada) Misha Goikhberg	1
(Germany) T3 Motorsport North America	Lamborghini Huracán GT3 Evo	Lamborghini DGF 5.2 L V10	71	(Guatemala) Mateo Llarena	1
(Germany) T3 Motorsport North America	Lamborghini Huracán GT3 Evo	Lamborghini DGF 5.2 L V10	71	(Germany) Maximilian Paul	1
(Germany) T3 Motorsport North America	Lamborghini Huracán GT3 Evo	Lamborghini DGF 5.2 L V10	71	(France) Franck Perera	1
(Australia) SunEnergy1 Racing	Mercedes-AMG GT3 Evo	Mercedes-AMG M159 6.2 L V8	75	(Australia) Kenny Habul	1
(Australia) SunEnergy1 Racing	Mercedes-AMG GT3 Evo	Mercedes-AMG M159 6.2 L V8	75	(Italy) Raffaele Marciello	1
(Australia) SunEnergy1 Racing	Mercedes-AMG GT3 Evo	Mercedes-AMG M159 6.2 L V8	75	(Germany) Fabian Schiller	1
(Australia) SunEnergy1 Racing	Mercedes-AMG GT3 Evo	Mercedes-AMG M159 6.2 L V8	75	(Germany) Luca Stolz	1
(United States) WeatherTech Racing	Mercedes-AMG GT3 Evo	Mercedes-AMG M159 6.2 L V8	79	(United States) Cooper MacNeil	9–11
(United States) WeatherTech Racing	Mercedes-AMG GT3 Evo	Mercedes-AMG M159 6.2 L V8	79	(France) Jules Gounon	9, 11
(United States) WeatherTech Racing	Mercedes-AMG GT3 Evo	Mercedes-AMG M159 6.2 L V8	79	(Spain) Daniel Juncadella	10
(United States) Turner Motorsport	BMW M4 GT3	BMW P58 3.0 L Turbo I6	96	(United States) Bill Auberlen	All
(United States) Turner Motorsport	BMW M4 GT3	BMW P58 3.0 L Turbo I6	96	(United States) Robby Foley	All
(United States) Turner Motorsport	BMW M4 GT3	BMW P58 3.0 L Turbo I6	96	(United States) Michael Dinan	1–2, 7, 12
(United States) Turner Motorsport	BMW M4 GT3	BMW P58 3.0 L Turbo I6	96	(Germany) Jens Klingmann	1
(Canada) Northwest AMR	Aston Martin Vantage AMR GT3	Aston Martin M177 4.0 L Turbo V8	98	(Republic of Ireland) Charlie Eastwood	1
(Canada) Northwest AMR	Aston Martin Vantage AMR GT3	Aston Martin M177 4.0 L Turbo V8	98	(Canada) Paul Dalla Lana	1
(Canada) Northwest AMR	Aston Martin Vantage AMR GT3	Aston Martin M177 4.0 L Turbo V8	98	(United Kingdom) David Pittard	1
(Canada) Northwest AMR	Aston Martin Vantage AMR GT3	Aston Martin M177 4.0 L Turbo V8	98	(Denmark) Nicki Thiim	1
(United States) Team Hardpoint	Porsche 911 GT3 R	Porsche M97/80 4.0 L Flat-6	99	(United States) Rob Ferriol	1–4, 7, 11–12
(United States) Team Hardpoint	Porsche 911 GT3 R	Porsche M97/80 4.0 L Flat-6	99	(United Kingdom) Katherine Legge	1–4, 7, 11–12
(United States) Team Hardpoint	Porsche 911 GT3 R	Porsche M97/80 4.0 L Flat-6	99	(United Kingdom) Stefan Wilson	1–2, 7
(United States) Team Hardpoint	Porsche 911 GT3 R	Porsche M97/80 4.0 L Flat-6	99	(United States) Nick Boulle	1, 12

†: Cosmo took part in the Daytona Qualifying Race with Gilbert Korthoff Motorsports before parting ways prior to the Rolex 24 at Daytona.

== Race results ==
Bold indicates overall and GTD winners.

Rnd	Circuit	DPi Winning Team	LMP2 Winning Team	LMP3 Winning Team	GTD Pro Winning Team	GTD Winning Team	Report
Rnd	Circuit	DPi Winning Drivers	LMP2 Winning Drivers	LMP3 Winning Drivers	GTD Pro Winning Drivers	GTD Winning Drivers	Report
QR	Daytona	**(United States) #10 WTR - Konica Minolta Acura**	(United States) #52 PR1/Mathiasen Motorsports	(United States) #36 Andretti Autosport	**(United States) #63 TR3 Racing**	(United States) #57 Winward Racing	Report
QR	Daytona	**(Portugal) Filipe Albuquerque** **(United States) Ricky Taylor**	(Denmark) Mikkel Jensen (United States) Ben Keating	(United States) Jarett Andretti (Australia) Josh Burdon	**(Italy) Mirko Bortolotti** **(Italy) Andrea Caldarelli**	(Austria) Lucas Auer (United States) Russell Ward	Report
1	Daytona	**(United States) #60 Meyer Shank Racing with Curb-Agajanian**	(United States) #81 DragonSpeed USA	(United States) #74 Riley Motorsports	**(Canada) #9 Pfaff Motorsports**	(United States) #16 Wright Motorsports	Report
1	Daytona	**(United Kingdom) Tom Blomqvist** **(Brazil) Hélio Castroneves** **(United Kingdom) Oliver Jarvis** **(France) Simon Pagenaud**	(Canada) Devlin DeFrancesco (United States) Colton Herta (United States) Eric Lux (Mexico) Pato O'Ward	(Netherlands) Kay van Berlo (United States) Michael Cooper (Brazil) Felipe Fraga (United States) Gar Robinson	**(Australia) Matt Campbell** **(France) Mathieu Jaminet** **(Brazil) Felipe Nasr**	(United States) Ryan Hardwick (Belgium) Jan Heylen (Austria) Richard Lietz (Canada) Zacharie Robichon	Report
2	Sebring	**(United States) #02 Cadillac Racing**	(United States) #52 PR1/Mathiasen Motorsports	(United States) #33 Sean Creech Motorsport	**(United States) #3 Corvette Racing**	(Italy) #47 Cetilar Racing	Report
2	Sebring	**(New Zealand) Earl Bamber** **(United Kingdom) Alex Lynn** **(Switzerland) Neel Jani**	(United States) Scott Huffaker (Denmark) Mikkel Jensen (United States) Ben Keating	(Portugal) João Barbosa (Denmark) Malthe Jakobsen (United States) Lance Willsey	**(Netherlands) Nicky Catsburg** **(Spain) Antonio García** **(United States) Jordan Taylor**	(Italy) Antonio Fuoco (Italy) Roberto Lacorte (Italy) Giorgio Sernagiotto	Report
3	Long Beach	**(United States) #01 Cadillac Racing**	did not participate	did not participate	**(United States) #23 Heart of Racing Team**	(United States) #1 Paul Miller Racing	Report
3	Long Beach	**(France) Sébastien Bourdais** **(Netherlands) Renger van der Zande**	did not participate	did not participate	**(United Kingdom) Ross Gunn** **(Spain) Alex Riberas**	(United States) Bryan Sellers (United States) Madison Snow	Report
4	Laguna Seca	**(United States) #10 WTR - Konica Minolta Acura**	(Canada) #8 Tower Motorsport	did not participate	**(Canada) #9 Pfaff Motorsports**	(United States) #16 Wright Motorsports	Report
4	Laguna Seca	**(Portugal) Filipe Albuquerque** **(United States) Ricky Taylor**	(Switzerland) Louis Delétraz (Canada) John Farano	did not participate	**(Australia) Matt Campbell** **(France) Mathieu Jaminet**	(United States) Ryan Hardwick (Belgium) Jan Heylen	Report
5	Mid-Ohio	**(United States) #10 WTR - Konica Minolta Acura**	(United States) #81 DragonSpeed USA	(United States) #54 CORE Autosport	did not participate	**(United States) #96 Turner Motorsport**	Report
5	Mid-Ohio	**(Portugal) Filipe Albuquerque** **(United States) Ricky Taylor**	(Sweden) Henrik Hedman (Colombia) Juan Pablo Montoya	(United States) Colin Braun (United States) Jon Bennett	did not participate	**(United States) Robby Foley** **(United States) Bill Auberlen**	Report
6	Belle Isle	**(United States) #01 Cadillac Racing**	did not participate	did not participate	did not participate	**(United States) #17 VasserSullivan**	Report
6	Belle Isle	**(France) Sébastien Bourdais** **(Netherlands) Renger van der Zande**	did not participate	did not participate	did not participate	**(United States) Kyle Kirkwood** **(United Kingdom) Ben Barnicoat**	Report
7	Watkins Glen	**(United States) #10 WTR - Konica Minolta Acura**	(United States) #52 PR1/Mathiasen Motorsports	(United States) #74 Riley Motorsports	(United States) #23 Heart of Racing Team	**(United States) #27 Heart of Racing Team**	Report
7	Watkins Glen	**(Portugal) Filipe Albuquerque** **(United States) Ricky Taylor**	(United States) Scott Huffaker (Denmark) Mikkel Jensen (United States) Ben Keating	(Netherlands) Kay van Berlo (Brazil) Felipe Fraga (United States) Gar Robinson	(United Kingdom) Ross Gunn (Spain) Alex Riberas	**(Canada) Roman De Angelis** **(United Kingdom) Ian James** **(Belgium) Maxime Martin**	Report
8	Mosport	**(United States) #01 Cadillac Racing**	did not participate	(United States) #54 CORE Autosport	**(Canada) #9 Pfaff Motorsports**	(United States) #27 Heart of Racing Team	Report
8	Mosport	**(France) Sébastien Bourdais** **(Netherlands) Renger van der Zande**	did not participate	(United States) Colin Braun (United States) Jon Bennett	**(Australia) Matt Campbell** **(France) Mathieu Jaminet**	(Canada) Roman De Angelis (Belgium) Maxime Martin	Report
9	Lime Rock	did not participate	did not participate	did not participate	**(Canada) #9 Pfaff Motorsports**	(United States) #1 Paul Miller Racing	Report
9	Lime Rock	did not participate	did not participate	did not participate	**(Australia) Matt Campbell** **(France) Mathieu Jaminet**	(United States) Bryan Sellers (United States) Madison Snow	Report
10	Road America	**(United States) #10 WTR - Konica Minolta Acura**	(United States) #18 Era Motorsport	(United States) #74 Riley Motorsports	**(United States) #14 VasserSullivan**	(United States) #57 Winward Racing	Report
10	Road America	**(Portugal) Filipe Albuquerque** **(United States) Ricky Taylor**	(United Kingdom) Ryan Dalziel (United States) Dwight Merriman	(Brazil) Felipe Fraga (United States) Gar Robinson	**(United Kingdom) Ben Barnicoat** **(United Kingdom) Jack Hawksworth**	(United Kingdom) Phillip Ellis (United States) Russell Ward	Report
11	VIR	did not participate	did not participate	did not participate	**(Canada) #9 Pfaff Motorsports**	(United States) #57 Winward Racing	Report
11	VIR	did not participate	did not participate	did not participate	**(Australia) Matt Campbell** **(France) Mathieu Jaminet**	(United Kingdom) Phillip Ellis (United States) Russell Ward	Report
12	Road Atlanta	**(United States) #60 Meyer Shank Racing with Curb-Agajanian**	(Canada) #8 Tower Motorsport	(United States) #36 Andretti Autosport	(United States) #14 VasserSullivan	**(United States) #66 Gradient Racing**	Report
12	Road Atlanta	**(United Kingdom) Tom Blomqvist** **(Brazil) Hélio Castroneves** **(United Kingdom) Oliver Jarvis**	(Portugal) Rui Andrade (Switzerland) Louis Delétraz (Canada) John Farano	(United States) Jarett Andretti (Australia) Josh Burdon (Colombia) Gabby Chaves	(United Kingdom) Ben Barnicoat (United Kingdom) Jack Hawksworth (United States) Kyle Kirkwood	**(United Kingdom) Till Bechtolsheimer** **(Germany) Mario Farnbacher** **(Barbados) Kyffin Simpson**	Report

== Championship standings ==
=== Points systems ===
Championship points are awarded in each class at the finish of each event. Points are awarded based on finishing positions in qualifying and the race as shown in the chart below.

Position	1	2	3	4	5	6	7	8	9	10	11	12	13	14	15	16	17	18	19	20	21	22	23	24	25	26	27	28	29	30+
Qualifying	35	32	30	28	26	25	24	23	22	21	20	19	18	17	16	15	14	13	12	11	10	9	8	7	6	5	4	3	2	1
Race	350	320	300	280	260	250	240	230	220	210	200	190	180	170	160	150	140	130	120	110	100	90	80	70	60	50	40	30	20	10

Drivers points

Points are awarded in each class at the finish of each event.

Team points

Team points are calculated in exactly the same way as driver points, using the point distribution chart. Each car entered is considered its own "team" regardless if it is a single entry or part of a two-car team.

Manufacturer points

There are also a number of manufacturer championships which utilize the same season-long point distribution chart. The manufacturer championships recognized by IMSA are as follows:

Daytona Prototype international (DPi): Engine & bodywork manufacturer
GT Daytona Pro (GTD Pro): Car manufacturer
GT Daytona (GTD): Car manufacturer

Each manufacturer receives finishing points for its highest finishing car in each class. The positions of subsequent finishing cars from the same manufacturer are not taken into consideration, and all other manufacturers move up in the order.

Example: Manufacturer A finishes 1st and 2nd at an event, and Manufacturer B finishes 3rd. Manufacturer A receives 35 first-place points while Manufacturer B would earn 32 second-place points.

Michelin Endurance Cup

The points system for the Michelin Endurance Cup is different from the normal points system. Points are awarded on a 5–4–3–2 basis for drivers, teams and manufacturers. The first finishing position at each interval earns five points, four points for second position, three points for third, with two points awarded for fourth and each subsequent finishing position.

Position	1	2	3	Other Classified
Race	5	4	3	2

At Rolex 24 at Daytona, points are awarded at 6 hours, 12 hours, 18 hours and at the finish. At the Sebring 12 hours, points are awarded at 4 hours, 8 hours and at the finish. At the Watkins Glen 6 hours, points are awarded at 3 hours and at the finish. At the Petit Le Mans (10 hours), points are awarded at 4 hours, 8 hours and at the finish.

Like the season-long team championship, Michelin Endurance Cup team points are awarded for each car and drivers get points in any car that they drive, in which they are entered for points. The manufacturer points go to the highest placed car from that manufacturer (the others from that manufacturer not being counted), just like the season-long manufacturer championship.

For example: in any particular segment manufacturer A finishes 1st and 2nd and manufacturer B finishes 3rd. Manufacturer A only receives first-place points for that segment. Manufacturer B receives the second-place points.

=== Drivers' Championships ===
==== Standings: Daytona Prototype International (DPi) ====
Pos.	Drivers	DAY		SEB	LBH	LGA	MOH	BEL	WGL	MOS	ELK	ATL	Points	MEC
Pos.	Drivers	Q	R	SEB	LBH	LGA	MOH	BEL	WGL	MOS	ELK	ATL	Points	MEC
1	(United Kingdom) Tom Blomqvist (United Kingdom) Oliver Jarvis	4	1	5	4	2	2	2	**2**	**2**	4	**1**	3432	39
2	(Portugal) Filipe Albuquerque (United States) Ricky Taylor	1	**2**	4	6	**1**	1	4	1	6	**1**	6	3346	39
3	(France) Sébastien Bourdais (Netherlands) Renger van der Zande	5	7	**7**	**1**	6	**5**	**1**	3	1	3	4	3220	31
4	(United Kingdom) Alex Lynn (New Zealand) Earl Bamber	6	6	1	2	5	4	3	4	4	2	5	3191	30
5	(Brazil) Pipo Derani	7	4	3	5	3	3	6	5	3	6	2	3083	36
6	(France) Tristan Vautier (United Kingdom) Richard Westbrook	**2**	3	2	3	4	6	5	7	5	5	7	2979	37
7	(United States) Tristan Nunez	7	4	3	5	3	3						1575	22
8	(France) Olivier Pla							6	5	3	6	2	1508	14
9	(France) Loïc Duval	**2**	3	2					7			7	1209	37
10	(United Kingdom) Mike Conway	7	4	3					5			2	1266	36
11	(Japan) Kamui Kobayashi (Germany) Mike Rockenfeller	3	5	6					6			3	1146	21
12	(United States) Jimmie Johnson	3	5						6			3	889	20
13	(Brazil) Hélio Castroneves	4	1									**1**	763	24
14	(United Kingdom) Will Stevens	1	**2**	4									665	22
15	(New Zealand) Scott Dixon	5	7									4	572	18
16	(United States) Ryan Hunter-Reay			**7**								5	567	14
17	(Argentina) José María López	3	5	6									566	17
18	(France) Simon Pagenaud	4	1										378	15
19	(Switzerland) Neel Jani			1									378	9
20	(United States) Alexander Rossi	1	**2**										355	13
21	(United States) Ben Keating	**2**	3										332	13
22	(New Zealand) Brendon Hartley											6	280	10
23	(Sweden) Marcus Ericsson (Denmark) Kevin Magnussen	6	6										275	8
24	(Spain) Álex Palou	5	7										266	11
Pos.	Drivers	DAY		SEB	LBH	LGA	MOH	BEL	WGL	MOS	ELK	ATL	Points	MEC

†: Post-event penalty. Car moved to back of class.

Colour	Result
Gold	Winner
Silver	Second place
Bronze	Third place
Green	Points classification
Blue	Non-points classification
Blue	Non-classified finish (NC)
Purple	Retired, not classified (Ret)
Red	Did not qualify (DNQ)
Red	Did not pre-qualify (DNPQ)
Black	Disqualified (DSQ)
White	Did not start (DNS)
White	Withdrew (WD)
White	Race cancelled (C)
Blank	Did not practice (DNP)
Blank	Did not arrive (DNA)
Blank	Excluded (EX)

**Bold** - Pole position

Italics - Fastest lap

==== Standings: Le Mans Prototype 2 (LMP2) ====
Pos.	Drivers	DAY^{‡}		SEB	LGA	MOH	WGL	ELK	ATL	Points	MEC
Pos.	Drivers	Q	R	SEB	LGA	MOH	WGL	ELK	ATL	Points	MEC
1	(Canada) John Farano	8	3	7	1	4	2	2	1	2018	36
2	(United Kingdom) Ryan Dalziel (United States) Dwight Merriman	10	10†	3	2	5	7	1	5	1892	27
3	(United States) Steven Thomas	2	7	4	**5**	2	6	**4**	**3**	1882	30
4	(Colombia) Juan Pablo Montoya (Sweden) Henrik Hedman			8	3	1	5	6	2	1878	23
5	(Denmark) Dennis Andersen	4	9	6	6	3	4	3	4	1828	33
6	(United States) Josh Pierson	2	7	4	4	**6**	6	5	**3**	1809	30
7	(Switzerland) Louis Delétraz	8	3	7	1		2	2	1	1712	36
8	(Denmark) Anders Fjordbach	4	9	6	6	3	4		4	1500	33
9	(United States) Jonathan Bomarito	2	7	4	**5**	2	6			1232	19
10	(Switzerland) Fabio Scherer	4	9	6			4	3	4	1225	33
11	(United States) Ben Keating (United States) Scott Huffaker (Denmark) Mikkel Jensen	**1**	**4**	**1**			**1**		6	1050	41
12	(Portugal) Rui Andrade	8	3	7			2		1	990	36
13	(Colombia) Sebastián Montoya			8			5		2	893	23
14	(United States) Patrick Kelly				4	**6**		5		889	-
15	(United States) Dylan Murry (Netherlands) Frits van Eerd (Netherlands) Giedo van der Garde	6	2	2			3			676	31
16	(United States) Tristan Nunez							**4**	**3**	650	11
17	(United Kingdom) Kyle Tilley	10	10†	3			7			594	21
18	(United Kingdom) Will Stevens					4				306	-
19	(Denmark) Christian Rasmussen								5	285	6
20	(United States) James McGuire (United Kingdom) Guy Smith	9	6	5						284	14
21	(United Kingdom) Duncan Tappy			5						284	6
-	(Canada) Devlin DeFrancesco (United States) Colton Herta (United States) Eric Lux (Mexico) Patricio O'Ward	5	1							0	13
-	(Netherlands) Rinus VeeKay	6	2							0	15
-	(Austria) Ferdinand Habsburg-Lothringen	8	3							0	12
-	(France) Nicolas Lapierre	**1**	**4**							0	13
-	(France) François Hériau (United Arab Emirates) Ed Jones (Denmark) Oliver Rasmussen (Germany) René Rast	3	5							0	8
-	(United Kingdom) Phil Hanson (United States) Will Owen	9	6							0	8
-	(United Kingdom) Harry Tincknell	2	7							0	8
-	(Australia) James Allen (United States) John Falb (Italy) Luca Ghiotto (Netherlands) Tijmen van der Helm	7	8							0	8
-	(Switzerland) Nico Müller	4	9							0	11
-	(France) Paul-Loup Chatin	10	10†							0	8
Pos.	Drivers	DAY^{‡}		SEB	LGA	MOH	WGL	ELK	ATL	Points	MEC

†: Post-event penalty. Car moved to back of class.

‡: Points count towards Michelin Endurance Cup championship only

==== Standings: Le Mans Prototype 3 (LMP3) ====
Pos.	Drivers	DAY^{‡}		SEB	MOH	WGL	MOS	ELK	ATL	Points	MEC
Pos.	Drivers	Q	R	SEB	MOH	WGL	MOS	ELK	ATL	Points	MEC
1	(United States) Jon Bennett (United States) Colin Braun	DNS	3	5	1	2	1	3	5	2002	32
2	(United States) Gar Robinson	8	1	**7**	4	1	**5**	1	**4**	1948	44
3	(Canada) Garett Grist	7	7	2	2	6	3	4	2	1942	38
3	(United States) Ari Balogh			2	2	6	3	4	2	1942	30
4	(Portugal) João Barbosa	5	2	1	6	5	6	**9**	3	1790	38
5	(United States) Jarett Andretti (Colombia) Gabby Chaves	1	**4**	10	**3**	11†	2	8	1	1764	35
6	(Canada) Orey Fidani	3	5	4	8	9	4	2	7	1716	26
7	(Brazil) Felipe Fraga	8	1	**7**	4	1		1	**4**	1653	44
8	(Denmark) Malthe Jakobsen	5	2	1		5		**9**	3	1241	38
9	(United States) Lance Willsey	5	2	1	6	5	6			1203	31
10	(United States) Dakota Dickerson			2	5	7		5		1195	12
11	(Australia) Cameron Shields	6	6	3		3		6	8	1158	27
12	(United States) Dan Goldburg	7	7	3	7	3			8	1152	27
13	(United Kingdom) Matthew Bell	3	5	8		8		2	7	1115	26
14	(United States) Josh Sarchet				5	7		5	6	1102	10
15	(Netherlands) Kay van Berlo	8	1	**7**		1			**4**	965	44
16	(Sweden) Rasmus Lindh	1	**4**	3	7	3				922	23
17	(United States) George Kurtz	DNS	3	5		2			5	921	32
18	(Australia) Josh Burdon	1	**4**	10		11†			1	822	35
19	(Germany) Lars Kern	3	5	4		9			7	812	26
20	(Canada) Kyle Marcelli					9	4		6	800	10
21	(Canada) Anthony Mantella			8		8			6	755	16
22	(United States) Nolan Siegel	6	6			6			2	618	26
23	(United States) Max Hanratty (Canada) James Vance			6		**4**				593	10
24	(Australia) Scott Andrews						**5**	7		558	-
25	(Canada) Kuno Wittmer	3	5	4	8					556	16
26	(United States) Tyler Maxson					7			8	502	10
27	(Belgium) Ugo de Wilde	6	6	9		10				481	18
28	(Chile) Nico Pino	7	7						3	332	7
29	(Argentina) Nicolás Varrone					**4**				315	4
30	(United States) Todd Archer			6						278	6
31	(United States) James French							6		276	-
32	(United States) Gerry Kraut							7		263	-
33	(United Kingdom) Wayne Boyd					8				254	4
34	(United States) Mark Kvamme	4	8	8						251	14
35	(United States) Harry Gottsacker (United States) Alec Udell			9						250	6
36	(Costa Rica) Danny Formal (United States) Dillon Machavern					10				231	4
-	(United States) Michael Cooper	8	1							0	17
-	(Sweden) Niclas Jönsson	DNS	3							0	14
-	(Guernsey) Sebastian Priaulx	5	2							0	13
-	(United States) C. R. Crews	6	6							0	8
-	(Japan) Hikaru Abe	7	7							0	8
-	(France) Antoine Doquin (United States) Trenton Estep (United States) Austin McCusker	4	8							0	8
-	(Dominican Republic) Efrin Castro (Germany) Moritz Kranz (United States) Joel Miller (United States) Ayrton Ori	2	9							0	8
Pos.	Drivers	DAY^{‡}		SEB	MOH	WGL	MOS	ELK	ATL	Points	MEC

†: Post-event penalty. Car moved to back of class.

‡: Points count towards Michelin Endurance Cup championship only

==== Standings: GT Daytona Pro (GTD Pro) ====
Pos.	Driver	DAY		SEB	LBH	LGA	WGL	MOS	LIM	ELK	VIR	ATL	Points	MEC
Pos.	Driver	Q	R	SEB	LBH	LGA	WGL	MOS	LIM	ELK	VIR	ATL	Points	MEC
1	(Australia) Matt Campbell (France) Mathieu Jaminet	2	1	5	5	**1**	3	**1**	**1**	2	1	3	3497	33
2	(United Kingdom) Ben Barnicoat	5	4	7	2	2	4	6	3	**1**	3	**1**	3277	32
3	(Spain) Antonio García (United States) Jordan Taylor	6	6	1	**3**	4	6	2	4	3	2	5	3194	33
4	(United Kingdom) Ross Gunn (Spain) Alex Riberas	4	13	11	1	5	1	3	2	4	**4**	4	3103	31
5	(United States) Connor De Phillippi (United States) John Edwards	12	7	10	6	3	**7**^{†}	5	5	5	5	4	2872	29
6	(United Kingdom) Jack Hawksworth	5	4	7	2	2			3	**1**	3	**1**	2693	27
7	(United States) Cooper MacNeil	8	8	6	4	6	5	4					1701	18
8	(Italy) Davide Rigon (Brazil) Daniel Serra	11	2	**9**			2					7	1213	35
9	(United States) Kyle Kirkwood	5	4				4					**1**	999	26
10	(Brazil) Felipe Nasr	2	1	5								3	992	28
11	(Netherlands) Nicky Catsburg	6	6	1								5	941	29
12	(Germany) Maro Engel	9	11	3			5						826	22
13	(Spain) Daniel Juncadella	9	11			6		4					809	11
14	(Brazil) Augusto Farfus	12	7	10			**7**^{†}						767	21
15	(Finland) Jesse Krohn	12	7									2	609	16
16	(United Kingdom) James Calado	11	2									7	608	23
17	(Italy) Mirko Bortolotti (Italy) Andrea Caldarelli (Italy) Marco Mapelli	1	**12**	2									577	18
18	(Canada) Mikaël Grenier						5					6	559	10
19	(France) Jules Gounon	9	11	3									542	18
20	(Austria) Philipp Eng (Germany) Marco Wittmann (United Kingdom) Nick Yelloly	13	9	4									542	18
21	(France) Julien Andlauer (Belgium) Alessio Picariello	8	8	6									524	14
22	(Belgium) Maxime Martin	4	13	11									436	14
23	(Italy) Alessandro Pier Guidi	11	2										340	13
24	(Switzerland) Alexandre Imperatori (Norway) Dennis Olsen (France) Patrick Pilet (Belgium) Laurens Vanthoor	**10**	3										321	17
25	(United Kingdom) Tom Gamble											4	312	8
26	(Italy) Raffaele Marciello				4								306	-
27	(Germany) Patrick Assenheimer (United States) Austin Cindric (Germany) Dirk Müller	3	5										290	10
28	(Japan) Kamui Kobayashi							6					276	-
29	(Germany) Maximilian Götz (Germany) Maximilian Buhk											6	275	6
30	(United States) Aaron Telitz			7									265	6
31	(Italy) Edward Cheever			**9**									255	6
32	(Italy) Matteo Cairoli	8	8										253	8
33	(United States) Ashton Harrison (United States) Tom Long (Canada) Kyle Marcelli			8									252	6
34	(South Africa) Sheldon van der Linde	13	9										238	8
35	(United States) Tommy Milner (Denmark) Marco Sørensen (United Kingdom) Nick Tandy	7	10										234	8
36	(Switzerland) Rolf Ineichen	1	**12**										225	8
Pos.	Driver	DAY		SEB	LBH	LGA	WGL	MOS	LIM	ELK	VIR	ATL	Points	MEC

†: Post-event penalty. Car moved to back of class.

==== Standings: Grand Touring Daytona (GTD) ====
Pos.	Drivers	DAY		SEB	LBH^{‡}	LGA	MOH	BEL	WGL	MOS^{‡}	LIM	ELK	VIR	ATL	Points	WTSC	MEC
Pos.	Drivers	Q	R	SEB	LBH^{‡}	LGA	MOH	BEL	WGL	MOS^{‡}	LIM	ELK	VIR	ATL	Points	WTSC	MEC
1	(Canada) Roman De Angelis	21	9	15	12	7	8	2	1	1	2	6	2	7	2898	2447	30
2	(United States) Ryan Hardwick (Belgium) Jan Heylen	11	1	**10**	5	1	9	7	6		6	7	5	4	2875	1963	30
3	(United Kingdom) Stevan McAleer	5	3	2	6	5	6	5	**10**^{†}		4	8	8	6	2860	1950	27
4	(United States) Bill Auberlen (United States) Robby Foley	20	18	4	4	3	1	8	3	4	10	**10**	7	3	2785	2294	29
5	(United Kingdom) Phillip Ellis (United States) Russell Ward	1	**6**	12	14	**14**	5	10	11^{†}	2	5	1	**1**	11	2714	2317	27
6	(United States) Bryan Sellers (United States) Madison Snow			16	**1**	4	**2**	3	13^{†}	5	1	4	3	**5**	2679	2673	20
7	(United States) Robert Megennis (United States) Jeff Westphal	8	17	13	11	2	4	6	7		3	2	11	15	2651	2054	25
8	(United States) Frankie Montecalvo	3	15	7	3	8	3	4	16^{†}	**6**	**8**	3	4	13	2602	2372	24
9	(United States) Mike Skeen	5	3	2	6		6	5	**10**^{†}		4	8	8	6	2577	1667	27
10	(United States) Aaron Telitz	3	15		3	8	3	4	16^{†}	**6**	**8**	3	4	13	2341	2372	18
11	(Belgium) Maxime Martin				12	7	8		1	1	2	6	2	7	2137	2095	13
12	(United States) Brendan Iribe	7	5	5	9	13	11^{†}		2					2	1644	661	44
13	(United States) Jaden Conwright	18	16	17		6			12^{†}			5	13	9	1526	765	24
14	(South Africa) Jordan Pepper	7	5	5			11^{†}		2					2	1445	221	44
15	(United States) Ryan Eversley (Australia) Aidan Read				8	12	10	9		3	9	9	9		1427	2004	-
16	(United States) Rob Ferriol (United Kingdom) Katherine Legge	14	10	8	7	10			14^{†}				10	12	1292	715	24
17	(United States) Andy Lally (United States) John Potter	9	2	6					5				12	14	1284	208	26
18	(Germany) Marco Holzer					6			12^{†}			5	13	9	1205	765	10
19	(Canada) Zacharie Robichon	11	1	10					6					4	1191	-	30
20	(Argentina) Luís Pérez Companc (United Kingdom) Simon Mann (Finland) Toni Vilander	17	4	3					8					8	1119	-	35
21	(United States) Richard Heistand	3	15	7			7		16^{†}					13	1103	264	24
22	(Italy) Roberto Lacorte (Italy) Giorgio Sernagiotto	12	14	1					4					10	1101	-	27
23	(United States) Michael Dinan	20	18	4					3					3	1100	-	29
24	(United States) Spencer Pumpelly	9	2	6					5						1076	-	20
25	(United Kingdom) Ian James	21	9	15					1					7	1048	-	30
26	(Germany) Mario Farnbacher	16	13	11	2				9					1	1003	346	26
26	(United Kingdom) Till Bechtolsheimer (Barbados) Kyffin Simpson	16	13	11					9					1	1003	-	28
27	(United Kingdom) Ollie Millroy	7	5	5					2						884	-	31
28	(Italy) Antonio Fuoco	12	14	1					4						870	-	21
29	(United States) Corey Lewis	8	17	13					7					15	817	-	25
30	(Germany) Dirk Müller					5			**10**^{†}					**5**	803	283	10
31	(United States) Don Yount	18	16	17					12^{†}					9	761	-	24
32	(United States) Cooper MacNeil										7	11	6		756	756	-
33	(Sweden) Erik Johansson			16					13^{†}					**5**	681	-	20
34	(Germany) Marvin Dienst			12					11^{†}					11	658	-	17
35	(United Kingdom) Stefan Wilson	14	10	8					14^{†}						627	-	18
36	(Canada) Daniel Morad (United States) Michael de Quesada	6	20	9		9									620	241	18
37	(Australia) Scott Andrews	5	3	7											587	-	15
38	(Spain) Daniel Juncadella			2								11			569	223	8
39	(France) Jules Gounon										7		6		533	533	-
40	(United States) Paul Holton (United States) Jon Miller	2	19	14	13				15^{†}						524	210	18
40	(United States) Patrick Gallagher	2	19	14					15^{†}						524	-	18
41	(Denmark) Frederik Schandorff	7	5		9	13									483	440	13
42	(United States) Nick Boulle	14	10											12	435	-	14
43	(United Kingdom) Tom Gamble	21	9	15											409	-	17
44	(Guatemala) Mateo Llarena	22	8	17											397	-	14
45	(United Kingdom) Ben Barnicoat (United States) Kyle Kirkwood							**1**							385	385	-
46	(Germany) Maximilian Götz	6	20	9											379	-	18
47	(Austria) Richard Lietz	11	1												370	-	14
48	(United Kingdom) Ross Gunn							2							352	352	-
49	(United Kingdom) Jonathan Adam	9	2												342	-	10
50	(Guernsey) Sebastian Priaulx													2	340	-	13
51	(Australia) James Davison	5	3												326	-	9
52	(United States) James Sofronas (United States) Kyle Washington	15	22		10	11									323	444	8
53	(Denmark) Nicklas Nielsen	17	4												294	-	11
54	(Austria) Lucas Auer (Canada) Mikaël Grenier	1	**6**												285	-	10
55	(United Kingdom) Jack Hawksworth						7								264	264	-
56	(United States) Ted Giovanis (United States) Hugh Plumb (United States) Matt Plumb (United States) Owen Trinkler	19	7												252	-	8
57	(Canada) Misha Goikhberg (Germany) Maximilian Paul (France) Franck Perera	22	8												239	-	8
58	(Belgium) Ulysse de Pauw													10	231	-	6
59	(United Kingdom) Darren Turner	21	9												230	-	11
60	(Italy) Giacomo Altoè (United States) John Megrue (United States) Jeff Segal (United States) Bill Sweedler	13	11												218	-	8
61	(Republic of Ireland) Charlie Eastwood (Canada) Paul Dalla Lana (United Kingdom) David Pittard (Denmark) Nicki Thiim	10	12												211	-	8
62	(United States) Marc Miller	16	13		2										195	346	9
63	(United States) Townsend Bell	3	15												190	-	8
64	(Italy) Alessio Rovera	12	14												189	-	8
65	(United Kingdom) Sandy Mitchell	8	17												163	-	9
66	(Chile) Benjamín Hites (Finland) Markus Palttala	18	16												163	-	8
67	(United States) Lance Bergstein	2	19												152	-	8
68	(Germany) Jens Klingmann	20	18												141	-	8
69	(Sweden) Linus Lundqvist	6	20												135	-	8
70	(Australia) Kenny Habul (Italy) Raffaele Marciello (Germany) Fabian Schiller (Germany) Luca Stolz	**4**	21												128	-	8
71	(Austria) Klaus Bachler (Netherlands) Jeroen Bleekemolen	15	22												106	-	8
Pos.	Drivers	DAY		SEB	LBH^{‡}	LGA	MOH	BEL	WGL	MOS^{‡}	LIM	ELK	VIR	ATL	Points	WTSC	MEC

†: Post-event penalty. Car moved to back of class.

‡: Points count towards WeatherTech Sprint Cup championship only.

=== Teams' Championships ===
==== Standings: Daytona Prototype International (DPi) ====
Pos.	Team	Car	DAY		SEB	LBH	LGA	MOH	BEL	WGL	MOS	ELK	ATL	Points	MEC
Pos.	Team	Car	Q	R	SEB	LBH	LGA	MOH	BEL	WGL	MOS	ELK	ATL	Points	MEC
1	#60 Meyer Shank Racing w/ Curb-Agajanian	Acura ARX-05	4	1	5	4	2	2	2	**2**	**2**	4	**1**	3432	39
2	#10 WTR - Konica Minolta Acura	Acura ARX-05	1	2	4	6	**1**	1	4	1	6	**1**	6	3346	39
3	#01 Cadillac Racing	Cadillac DPi-V.R	5	7	**7**	**1**	6	**5**	**1**	3	1	3	4	3220	31
4	#02 Cadillac Racing	Cadillac DPi-V.R	6	6	1	2	5	4	3	4	4	2	5	3191	30
5	#31 Whelen Engineering Racing	Cadillac DPi-V.R	7	4	3	5	3	3	6	5	3	6	2	3083	36
6	#5 JDC-Miller MotorSports	Cadillac DPi-V.R	**2**	3	2	3	4	6	5	7	5	5	7	2979	37
7	#48 Ally Cadillac Racing	Cadillac DPi-V.R	3	5	6					6			3	1165	28
Pos.	Team	Car	DAY		SEB	LBH	LGA	MOH	BEL	WGL	MOS	ELK	ATL	Points	MEC

†: Post-event penalty. Car moved to back of class.

==== Standings: Le Mans Prototype 2 (LMP2) ====
Pos.	Team	Car	DAY^{‡}		SEB	LGA	MOH	WGL	ELK	ATL	Points	MEC
Pos.	Team	Car	Q	R	SEB	LGA	MOH	WGL	ELK	ATL	Points	MEC
1	#8 Tower Motorsport	Oreca 07	8	3	7	1	4	2	2	1	2018	36
2	#52 PR1/Mathiasen Motorsports	Oreca 07	**1**	**4**	**1**	4	**6**	**1**	5	6	1939	41
3	#18 Era Motorsport	Oreca 07	10	10^{†}	3	2	5	7	1	5	1892	27
4	#11 PR1/Mathiasen Motorsports	Oreca 07	2	7	4	**5**	2	6	**4**	**3**	1882	30
5	#81 DragonSpeed USA	Oreca 07	5	1	8	3	1	5	6	2	1878	36
6	#20 High Class Racing	Oreca 07	4	9	6	6	3	4	3	4	1828	33
7	#29 Racing Team Nederland	Oreca 07	6	2	2			3			676	31
8	#22 United Autosports	Oreca 07	9	6	5						284	14
9	#68 G-Drive Racing by APR	Oreca 07	3	5							0	8
10	#69 G-Drive Racing by APR	Oreca 07	7	8							0	8
Pos.	Team	Chassis	DAY^{‡}		SEB	LGA	MOH	WGL	ELK	ATL	Points	MEC

†: Post-event penalty. Car moved to back of class.

‡: Points only awarded towards Michelin Endurance Cup championship

==== Standings: Le Mans Prototype 3 (LMP3) ====
Pos.	Team	Car	DAY^{‡}		SEB	MOH	WGL	MOS	ELK	ATL	Points	MEC
Pos.	Team	Car	Q	R	SEB	MOH	WGL	MOS	ELK	ATL	Points	MEC
1	#54 CORE Autosport	Ligier JS P320	DNS	3	5	1	2	1	3	5	2002	32
2	#74 Riley Motorsports	Ligier JS P320	8	1	**7**	4	1	**5**	1	**4**	1948	44
3	#30 Jr III Motorsports	Ligier JS P320			2	2	6	3	4	2	1942	30
4	#33 Sean Creech Motorsport	Ligier JS P320	5	2	1	6	5	6	**9**	3	1790	38
5	#36 Andretti Autosport	Ligier JS P320	1	**4**	10	**3**	11^{†}	2	8	1	1764	35
6	#13 AWA	Duqueine M30 - D-08	3	5	4	8	9	4	2	7	1716	26
7	#38 Performance Tech Motorsports	Ligier JS P320	7	7	3	7	3		6	8	1428	27
8	#58 MLT Motorsports	Ligier JS P320				5	7		5		852	4
9	#40 FastMD Racing	Duqueine M30 - D-08			6		**4**				593	10
10	#7 Forty7 Motorsports	Duqueine M30 - D-08	4	8	8		8				505	18
11	#6 Mühlner Motorsports America	Duqueine M30 - D-08	2	9	9		10				481	18
12	#90 JDC–Miller MotorSports	Duqueine M30 - D-08							7		263	-
13	#76 AWA	Duqueine M30 - D-08								6	250	6
14	#26 Mühlner Motorsports America	Duqueine M30 - D-08	**6**	6							0	8
Pos.	Team	Chassis	DAY^{‡}		SEB	MOH	WGL	MOS	ELK	ATL	Points	MEC

†: Post-event penalty. Car moved to back of class.

‡: Points count towards Michelin Endurance Cup championship only

==== Standings: GT Daytona Pro (GTD Pro) ====
Pos.	Team	Car	DAY		SEB	LBH	LGA	WGL	MOS	LIM	ELK	VIR	ATL	Points	MEC
Pos.	Team	Car	Q	R	SEB	LBH	LGA	WGL	MOS	LIM	ELK	VIR	ATL	Points	MEC
1	#9 Pfaff Motorsports	Porsche 911 GT3 R	2	1	5	5	**1**	3	**1**	**1**	2	1	3	3497	33
2	#14 VasserSullivan	Lexus RC F GT3	5	4	7	2	2	4	6	3	**1**	3	**1**	3277	32
3	#3 Corvette Racing	Chevrolet Corvette C8.R GTD	6	6	1	**3**	4	6	2	4	3	2	5	3194	33
4	#23 Heart of Racing Team	Aston Martin Vantage AMR GT3	4	13	11	1	5	1	3	2	4	**4**	4	3103	31
5	#25 BMW M Team RLL	BMW M4 GT3	12	7	10	6	3	**7**^{†}	5	5	5	5	2	2872	29
6	#79 WeatherTech Racing	Porsche 911 GT3 R	8	8	6									1976	24
6	#79 WeatherTech Racing	Mercedes-AMG GT3 Evo				4	6	5	4				6	1976	24
7	#62 Risi Competizione	Ferrari 488 GT3 Evo 2020	11	2	**9**			2					7^{†}	1213	35
8	#63 TR3 Racing	Lamborghini Huracán GT3 Evo	1	**12**	2									577	18
9	#97 WeatherTech Racing	Mercedes-AMG GT3 Evo	9	11	3									542	18
10	#24 BMW M Team RLL	BMW M4 GT3	13	9	4									542	18
11	#2 KCMG	Porsche 911 GT3 R	**10**	3										321	17
12	#15 Proton USA	Mercedes-AMG GT3 Evo	3	5										290	10
13	#93 WTR - Racer's Edge Motorsports	Acura NSX GT3 Evo22			8									252	6
14	#4 Corvette Racing	Chevrolet Corvette C8.R GTD	7	10										234	8
Pos.	Team	Chassis	DAY		SEB	LBH	LGA	WGL	MOS	LIM	ELK	VIR	ATL	Points	MEC

†: Post-event penalty. Car moved to back of class.

==== Standings: Grand Touring Daytona (GTD) ====
Pos.	Team	Car	DAY		SEB	LBH^{‡}	LGA	MOH	BEL	WGL	MOS^{‡}	LIM	ELK	VIR	ATL	Points	WTSC	MEC
Pos.	Team	Car	Q	R	SEB	LBH^{‡}	LGA	MOH	BEL	WGL	MOS^{‡}	LIM	ELK	VIR	ATL	Points	WTSC	MEC
1	#27 Heart of Racing Team	Aston Martin Vantage AMR GT3	21	9	15	12	7	8	2	1	1	2	6	2	7	2898	2447	30
2	#16 Wright Motorsports	Porsche 911 GT3 R	11	1	**10**	5	1	9	7	6		6	7	5	4	2875	1963	30
3	#32 / Gilbert Korthoff Motorsports; #32 / Team Korthoff Motorsports	Mercedes-AMG GT3 Evo	5	3	2	6	5	6	5	**10**^{†}		4	8	8	6	2860	1950	27
4	#96 Turner Motorsport	BMW M4 GT3	20	18	4	4	3	1	8	3	4	10	**10**	7	3	2785	2294	29
5	#57 Winward Racing	Mercedes-AMG GT3 Evo	1	**6**	12	14	**14**	5	10	11^{†}	2	5	1	**1**	11	2714	2317	27
6	#1 Paul Miller Racing	BMW M4 GT3			16	**1**	4	**2**	3	13^{†}	5	1	4	3	**5**	2679	2673	20
7	#39 CarBahn with Peregrine Racing	Lamborghini Huracán GT3 Evo	8	17	13	11	2	4	6	7		3	2	11	15	2651	2054	25
8	#12 VasserSullivan	Lexus RC F GT3	3	15	7	3	8	3	4	16^{†}	**6**	**8**	3	4	13	2602	2372	24
9	#70 Inception Racing with Optimum Motorsport	McLaren 720S GT3	7	5	5	9	13	11^{†}		2					2	1644	661	44
10	#42 NTE Sport/SSR	Lamborghini Huracán GT3 Evo	18	16	17		6			12^{†}			5	13	9	1526	765	24
11	#51 Rick Ware Racing	Acura NSX GT3 Evo22				8	12	10	9		3	9	9	9		1427	2004	-
12	#99 Team Hardpoint	Porsche 911 GT3 R	14	10	8	7	10			14^{†}				10	12	1292	715	24
13	#44 Magnus Racing	Aston Martin Vantage AMR GT3	9	2	6					5				12	14	1284	208	26
14	#21 AF Corse	Ferrari 488 GT3 Evo 2020	17	4	3					8					8	1119	-	35
15	#47 Cetilar Racing	Ferrari 488 GT3 Evo 2020	12	14	1					4					10	1101	-	27
16	#66 Gradient Racing	Acura NSX GT3 Evo22	16	13	11	2				9					1	1003	346	28
17	#79 WeatherTech Racing	Mercedes-AMG GT3 Evo										7	11	6		756	756	-
18	#17 VasserSullivan	Lexus RC F GT3						7	**1**							649	649	-
19	#28 Alegra Motorsports	Mercedes-AMG GT3 Evo	6	20	9		9									620	241	18
20	#59 Crucial Motorsports	McLaren 720S GT3	2	19	14	13				15^{†}						524	210	18
21	#34 GMG Racing	Porsche 911 GT3 R	15	22		10	11									323	444	8
22	#64 Team TGM	Porsche 911 GT3 R	19	7												252	-	8
23	#71 T3 Motorsport North America	Lamborghini Huracán GT3 Evo	22	8												239	-	8
24	#19 TR3 Racing	Lamborghini Huracán GT3 Evo	13	11												218	-	8
25	#98 Northwest AMR	Aston Martin Vantage AMR GT3	10	12												211	-	8
26	#75 SunEnergy1 Racing	Mercedes-AMG GT3 Evo	**4**	21												128	-	8
Pos.	Team	Car	DAY		SEB	LBH^{‡}	LGA	MOH	BEL	WGL	MOS^{‡}	LIM	ELK	VIR	ATL	Points	WTSC	MEC

†: Post-event penalty. Car moved to back of class.

‡: Points count towards WeatherTech Sprint Cup championship only.

=== Manufacturers' Championships ===
==== Standings: Daytona Prototype International (DPi) ====
Pos.	Manufacturer	DAY		SEB	LBH	LGA	MOH	BEL	WGL	MOS	ELK	ATL	Points	MEC
Pos.	Manufacturer	Q	R	SEB	LBH	LGA	MOH	BEL	WGL	MOS	ELK	ATL	Points	MEC
1	(Japan) Acura	1	**1**	4	4	**1**	1	2	**1**	**2**	**1**	**1**	3718	55
2	(United States) Cadillac	**2**	3	**1**	**1**	3	**3**	**1**	3	1	2	2	3652	53
Pos.	Team	DAY		SEB	LBH	LGA	MOH	BEL	WGL	MOS	ELK	ATL	Points	MEC

==== Standings: GT Daytona Pro (GTD Pro) ====
Pos.	Manufacturer	DAY		SEB	LBH	LGA	WGL	MOS	LIM	ELK	VIR	ATL	Points	MEC
Pos.	Manufacturer	Q	R	SEB	LBH	LGA	WGL	MOS	LIM	ELK	VIR	ATL	Points	MEC
1	(Germany) Porsche	**2**	1	5	5	**1**	3	**1**	**1**	2	1	3	3497	39
2	(Japan) Lexus	7	4	7	2	2	4	6	3	**1**	3	**1**	3307	34
3	(United States) Chevrolet	8	6	1	**3**	4	6	2	4	3	2	5	3204	33
4	(United Kingdom) Aston Martin	6	13	11	1	5	1	3	2	4	**4**	4	3173	31
5	(Germany) BMW	12	7	4	6	3	**7**	5	5	5	5	2	2957	33
6	(Germany) Mercedes-AMG	3	5	3	4	6	5	4				6	2084	30
7	(Italy) Ferrari	11	2	**9**			2					7	1227	36
8	(Italy) Lamborghini	1	**12**	2									627	18
9	(Japan) Acura			8									263	6
Pos.	Team	DAY		SEB	LBH	LGA	WGL	MOS	LIM	ELK	VIR	ATL	Points	MEC

==== Standings: Grand Touring Daytona (GTD) ====
Pos.	Manufacturer	DAY		SEB	LBH^{‡}	LGA	MOH	BEL	WGL	MOS^{‡}	LIM	ELK	VIR	ATL	Points	WTSC	MEC
Pos.	Manufacturer	Q	R	SEB	LBH^{‡}	LGA	MOH	BEL	WGL	MOS^{‡}	LIM	ELK	VIR	ATL	Points	WTSC	MEC
1	(Germany) BMW	20	18	4	**1**	3	**1**	3	3	4	1	**4**	3	**3**	3307	2763	33
2	(Germany) Mercedes-AMG	**1**	**3**	2	6	**5**	5	5	**10**	2	4	1	**1**	6	3235	2641	33
3	(United Kingdom) Aston Martin	9	2	6	12	7	8	2	1	1	2	6	2	7	3193	2550	32
4	(Germany) Porsche	11	1	**8**	5	1	9	7	6		6	7	5	4	3004	2067	30
5	(Italy) Lamborghini	8	8	13	11	2	4	6	5		3	2	11	9	2971	2178	25
6	(Japan) Lexus	3	15	7	3	8	3	**1**	16	**6**	**8**	3	4	13	2939	2525	25
7	(Japan) Acura	16	13	11	2	12	10	9	9	3	9	9	9	1	2761	2284	29
8	(United Kingdom) McLaren	2	5	5	9	13	11		2					2	1790	787	44
9	(Italy) Ferrari	12	4	1					4					8	1254	-	37
Pos.	Team	DAY		SEB	LBH^{‡}	LGA	MOH	BEL	WGL	MOS^{‡}	LIM	ELK	VIR	ATL	Points	WTSC	MEC
