= 2022 Chevrolet Grand Prix =

Sports car race in Ontario

The Canadian Tire Motorsports Park

The 2022 Chevrolet Grand Prix was a sports car race held at the Canadian Tire Motorsports Park in Bowmanville, Ontario, Canada on July 3, 2022. It was the eighth round of the 2022 IMSA SportsCar Championship and the fifth round of the 2022 WeatherTech Sprint Cup. The 01 Cadillac Racing entry piloted by Sébastien Bourdais and Renger van der Zande took the overall victory. The No. 54 CORE Autosport Ligier JS P320 driven by Jon Bennett and Colin Braun won in the LMP3 class. In the GTD Pro class, the No. 9 Pfaff Motorsports Porsche 911 GT3 R driven by Mathieu Jaminet and Matt Campbell claimed victory, while in GTD the No. 27 Heart of Racing Team Aston Martin Vantage AMR GT3 driven by Roman De Angelis and Maxime Martin claimed victory.

== Background ==
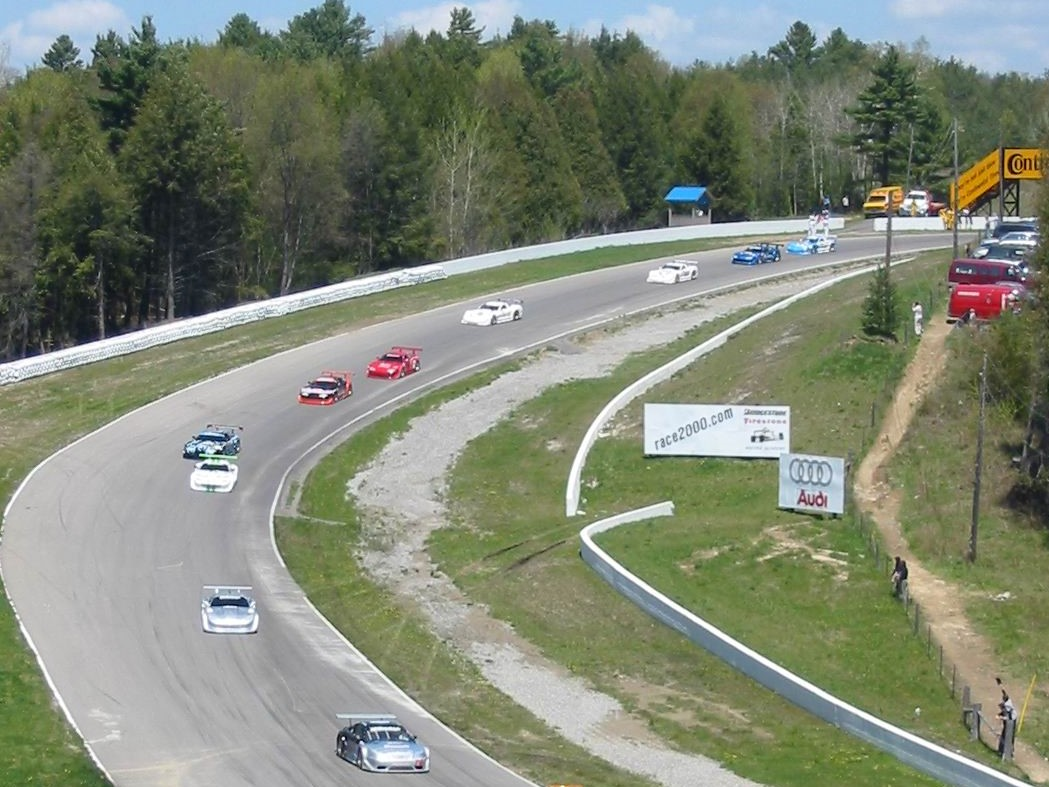
Canadian Tire Motorsports Park, where the race was held.

International Motor Sports Association's (IMSA) president John Doonan confirmed the race was part of the schedule for the 2022 IMSA SportsCar Championship (IMSA SCC) in August 2021. It was the seventh year the event was held as part of the WeatherTech SportsCar Championship. The 2022 Chevrolet Grand Prix was the eighth of twelve scheduled sports car races of 2022 by IMSA, and it was the fifth of eight rounds held as part of the WeatherTech Sprint Cup. The race was held at the ten-turn 2.459 mi (3.957 km) Canadian Tire Motorsports Park in Bowmanville, Ontario, Canada on July 3, 2022. The race marked IMSA's return to Canadian Tire Motorsports Park after the previous 2 years editions were cancelled as a result of the COVID-19 Pandemic in Canada. Competitors were required to be vaccinated prior to traveling.

On June 28, 2022, IMSA issued the latest technical bulletin outlining Balance of Performance for the event. In the GTD classes, the Aston Martin Vantage AMR GT3, BMW M4 GT3, and Ferrari 488 GT3 Evo 2020 received a 20 kilogram weight increase while the Lamborghini Huracán GT3 Evo received a 20 kilogram weight break. No changes were made in DPi.

Before the race, Filipe Albuquerque and Ricky Taylor led the DPi Drivers' Championship with 2399 points, 17 points ahead of Tom Blomqvist and Oliver Jarvis. With 1001 points, Jon Bennett and Colin Braun led the LMP3 Drivers' Championship; the duo held a fifty-point advantage over Garett Grist and Ari Balogh. In GTD Pro, Matt Campbell and Mathieu Jaminet led the Drivers' Championship with 1671 points, ahead of Ben Barnicoat with 1573 points. The GTD Drivers' Championship was led by Stevan McAleer with 1765 points, 5 points ahead of Ryan Hardwick and Jan Heylen. Acura, Porsche, and BMW were leading their respective Manufactures' Championships while Wayne Taylor Racing, CORE Autosport, Pfaff Motorsports, and Gilbert Korthoff Motorsports each led their own Teams' Championships.

=== Entries ===
A total of 24 cars took part in the event, split across four classes. 6 were entered in DPi, 6 in LMP3, 6 in GT Daytona Pro, and 6 in GTD. The only changed from the previous round in DPi was the absence of Ally Cadillac Racing. Risi Competizione's absence saw 6 cars competing in GTD Pro. Kamui Kobayashi substituted for Jack Hawsworth in the Vasser Sullivan Racing #14. Scott Andrews substituted for Felipe Fraga in the Riley Motorsports entry due to a clash with the DTM round at the Norisring. In GTD, CarBahn with Peregrine Racing were forced to skip after their primary car was destroyed in a crash at Watkins Glen. Wright Motorsports, Team Korthoff Motorsports, and Inception Racing elected to forego the round due to its championship point output only counting for the WeatherTech Sprint Cup.

== Practice ==
There were two practice sessions preceding the start of the race on Sunday; one on Friday and one on Saturday. The first session on Friday afternoon ran for 90 minutes while the second session on Saturday morning lasted 105 minutes.

== Qualifying ==
Saturday's afternoon qualifying was broken into three sessions, with one session for the DPi LMP3, GTD Pro and GTD classes, which lasted for 15 minutes each, and a ten minute interval between the sessions. The rules dictated that all teams nominated a driver to qualify their cars, with the Pro-Am (LMP3/GTD) classes requiring a Bronze/Silver Rated Driver to qualify the car. The competitors' fastest lap times determined the starting order. IMSA then arranged the grid to put DPis ahead of the LMP3, GTD Pro, and GTD cars.

=== Qualifying results ===
Pole positions in each class are indicated in bold and by ‡.

Pos.	Class	PIC	No.	Team	Driver	Time	Gap	Grid
1	**DPi**	**1**	**60**	**(United States) Meyer Shank Racing with Curb-Agajanian**	**(United Kingdom) Tom Blomqvist**	**1:04.394**	-	1‡
2	DPi	2	10	(United States) WTR - Konica Minolta Acura	(United States) Ricky Taylor	1:04.462	+0.068	2
3	DPi	3	5	(United States) JDC-Miller MotorSports	(France) Tristan Vautier	1:04.895	+0.501	3
4	DPi	4	02	(United States) Cadillac Racing	(United Kingdom) Alex Lynn	1:05.082	+0.688	4
5	DPi	5	31	(United States) Whelen Engineering Racing	(France) Olivier Pla	1:05.126	+0.732	5
6	DPi	6	01	(United States) Cadillac Racing	(France) Sébastien Bourdais	1:05.266	+0.872	6
7	**LMP3**	**1**	**36**	**(United States) Andretti Autosport**	**(United States) Jarett Andretti**	**1:13.102**	**+8.708**	7‡
8	LMP3	2	74	(United States) Riley Motorsports	(United States) Gar Robinson	1:13.174	+8.870	8
9	LMP3	3	30	(United States) Jr III Motorsports	(United States) Ari Balogh	1:13.815	+9.421	9
10	LMP3	4	54	(United States) CORE Autosport	(United States) Jon Bennett	1:14.056	+9.662	10
11	LMP3	5	13	(Canada) AWA	(Canada) Orey Fidani	1::14.832	+10.438	11
12	LMP3	6	33	(United States) Sean Creech Motorsport	(United States) Lance Willsey	1:15.121	+10.727	12
13	**GTD Pro**	**1**	**9**	**(Canada) Pfaff Motorsports**	**(France) Mathieu Jaminet**	**1:15.468**	**+11.074**	13‡
14	**GTD**	**1**	**12**	**(United States) Vasser Sullivan Racing**	**(United States) Frankie Montecalvo**	**1:15.633**	**+11.239**	14‡
15	GTD Pro	2	23	(United States) Heart of Racing Team	(Spain) Alex Riberas	1:15.890	+11.496	15
16	GTD Pro	3	25	(United States) BMW M Team RLL	(United States) John Edwards	1:15.899	+11.505	16
17	GTD Pro	4	3	(United States) Corvette Racing	(United States) Jordan Taylor	1:15.955	+11.561	17
18	GTD	2	27	(United States) Heart of Racing Team	(Canada) Roman De Angelis	1:15.975	+11.581	18
19	GTD	3	1	(United States) Paul Miller Racing	(United States) Madison Snow	1:16.004	+11.610	19
20	GTD	4	57	(United States) Winward Racing	(United States) Russell Ward	1:16.039	+11.645	20
21	GTD Pro	5	14	(United States) Vasser Sullivan Racing	(United Kingdom) Ben Barnicoat	1:16.071	+11.677	21
22	GTD	5	96	(United States) Turner Motorsport	(United States) Robby Foley	1:16.156	+11.762	22
23	GTD	6	51	(Philippines) RWR Eurasia Motorsport	(Australia) Aidan Read	1:16.250	+11.856	23
24	GTD Pro	6	79	(United States) WeatherTech Racing	(United States) Cooper MacNeil	1:17.071	+12.677	24

== Race ==
=== Post-Race ===
Blomqvist and Jarvis retook the lead of the DPi Drivers' Championship while Filipe Albuquerque and Ricky Taylor dropped to second. Bourdais and van der Zande advanced from fourth to third while Bamber and Lynn dropped from third to fourth. In The LMP3 Drivers' Championship, Bennett and Braun extended their lead to 98 points over Grist and Balogh, while Andretti and Chaves moved to fifth after being eighth coming into Canadian Tire Motorsports Park. With a total of 2056 points, Campbell and Jaminet's victory increase their advantage to 138 points as Antonio García and Jordan Taylor took over second position in the GTD Pro Drivers' Championship. GTD drivers, teams, and manufactures did not score full season points due to the event only counting towards the WeatherTech Sprint Cup. Acura and Porsche continued to top their respective Manufacturers' Championships, while CORE Autosport and Pfaff Motorsports kept their respective advantages in their Teams' Championships. Meyer Shank Racing took the lead of the DPi Teams' Championship with four rounds remaining.

=== Race results ===
Class winners are denoted in bold and ‡.

Pos	Class	PIC	No.	Team	Drivers	Chassis	Laps	Time/Retired
Pos	Class	PIC	No.	Team	Drivers	Engine	Laps	Time/Retired
1	**DPi**	**1**	**01**	**(United States) Cadillac Racing**	**(France) Sébastien Bourdais (Netherlands) Renger van der Zande**	**Cadillac DPi-V.R**	**123**	**2:40:31.158‡**
1	**DPi**	**1**	**01**	**(United States) Cadillac Racing**	**(France) Sébastien Bourdais (Netherlands) Renger van der Zande**	**Cadillac 5.5 L V8**	**123**	**2:40:31.158‡**
2	DPi	2	60	(United States) Meyer Shank Racing with Curb-Agajanian	(United Kingdom) Tom Blomqvist (United Kingdom) Oliver Jarvis	Acura ARX-05	123	+3.509
2	DPi	2	60	(United States) Meyer Shank Racing with Curb-Agajanian	(United Kingdom) Tom Blomqvist (United Kingdom) Oliver Jarvis	Acura AR35TT 3.5 L Turbo V6	123	+3.509
3	DPi	3	31	(United States) Whelen Engineering Racing	(France) Olivier Pla (Brazil) Pipo Derani	Cadillac DPi-V.R	123	+4.272
3	DPi	3	31	(United States) Whelen Engineering Racing	(France) Olivier Pla (Brazil) Pipo Derani	Cadillac 5.5 L V8	123	+4.272
4	DPi	4	02	(United States) Chip Ganassi Racing	(United Kingdom) Alex Lynn (New Zealand) Earl Bamber	Cadillac DPi-V.R	123	+4.704
4	DPi	4	02	(United States) Chip Ganassi Racing	(United Kingdom) Alex Lynn (New Zealand) Earl Bamber	Cadillac 5.5 L V8	123	+4.704
5	DPi	5	5	(United States) JDC-Miller MotorSports	(France) Tristan Vautier (United Kingdom) Richard Westbrook	Cadillac DPi-V.R	123	+5.785
5	DPi	5	5	(United States) JDC-Miller MotorSports	(France) Tristan Vautier (United Kingdom) Richard Westbrook	Cadillac 5.5 L V8	123	+5.785
6	DPi	6	10	(United States) WTR - Konica Minolta Acura	(United States) Ricky Taylor (Portugal) Filipe Albuquerque	Acura ARX-05	123	+15.025
6	DPi	6	10	(United States) WTR - Konica Minolta Acura	(United States) Ricky Taylor (Portugal) Filipe Albuquerque	Acura AR35TT 3.5 L Turbo V6	123	+15.025
7	**LMP3**	**1**	**54**	**(United States) CORE Autosport**	**(United States) Jon Bennett (United States) Colin Braun**	**Ligier JS P320**	**115**	**+8 Laps‡**
7	**LMP3**	**1**	**54**	**(United States) CORE Autosport**	**(United States) Jon Bennett (United States) Colin Braun**	**Nissan VK56DE 5.6 L V8**	**115**	**+8 Laps‡**
8	LMP3	2	36	(United States) Andretti Autosport	(United States) Jarett Andretti (Colombia) Gabby Chaves	Ligier JS P320	115	+8 Laps
8	LMP3	2	36	(United States) Andretti Autosport	(United States) Jarett Andretti (Colombia) Gabby Chaves	Nissan VK56DE 5.6 L V8	115	+8 Laps
9	LMP3	3	30	(United States) Jr III Motorsports	(United States) Ari Balogh (Canada) Garett Grist	Ligier JS P320	115	+8 Laps
9	LMP3	3	30	(United States) Jr III Motorsports	(United States) Ari Balogh (Canada) Garett Grist	Nissan VK56DE 5.6 L V8	115	+8 Laps
10	LMP3	4	13	(Canada) AWA	(Canada) Orey Fidani (Canada) Kyle Marcelli	Duqueine M30 - D08	114	+9 Laps
10	LMP3	4	13	(Canada) AWA	(Canada) Orey Fidani (Canada) Kyle Marcelli	Nissan VK56DE 5.6 L V8	114	+9 Laps
11	**GTD Pro**	**1**	**9**	**(Canada) Pfaff Motorsports**	**(France) Mathieu Jaminet (Australia) Matt Campbell**	**Porsche 911 GT3 R**	**111**	**+12 Laps‡**
11	**GTD Pro**	**1**	**9**	**(Canada) Pfaff Motorsports**	**(France) Mathieu Jaminet (Australia) Matt Campbell**	**Porsche 4.0 L Flat-6**	**111**	**+12 Laps‡**
12	GTD Pro	2	3	(United States) Corvette Racing	(United States) Jordan Taylor (Spain) Antonio Garcia	Chevrolet Corvette C8.R GTD	111	+12 Laps
12	GTD Pro	2	3	(United States) Corvette Racing	(United States) Jordan Taylor (Spain) Antonio Garcia	Chevrolet 5.5 L V8	111	+12 Laps
13	GTD Pro	3	23	(United States) Heart of Racing Team	(Spain) Alex Riberas (United Kingdom) Ross Gunn	Aston Martin Vantage AMR GT3	111	+12 Laps
13	GTD Pro	3	23	(United States) Heart of Racing Team	(Spain) Alex Riberas (United Kingdom) Ross Gunn	Aston Martin 4.0 L Turbo V8	111	+12 Laps
14	**GTD**	**1**	**27**	**(United States) Heart of Racing Team**	**(United Kingdom) Roman De Angelis (Belgium) Maxime Martin**	**Aston Martin Vantage AMR GT3**	**111**	**+12 Laps‡**
14	**GTD**	**1**	**27**	**(United States) Heart of Racing Team**	**(United Kingdom) Roman De Angelis (Belgium) Maxime Martin**	**Aston Martin 4.0 L Turbo V8**	**111**	**+12 Laps‡**
15	GTD	2	57	(United Kingdom) Winward Racing	(United States) Russell Ward (United Kingdom) Philip Ellis	Mercedes-AMG GT3 Evo	111	+12 Laps
15	GTD	2	57	(United Kingdom) Winward Racing	(United States) Russell Ward (United Kingdom) Philip Ellis	Mercedes-AMG M159 6.2 L V8	111	+12 Laps
16	GTD Pro	4	79	(United States) WeatherTech Racing	(United States) Cooper MacNeil (Spain) Daniel Juncadella	Mercedes-AMG GT3 Evo	111	+12 laps
16	GTD Pro	4	79	(United States) WeatherTech Racing	(United States) Cooper MacNeil (Spain) Daniel Juncadella	Mercedes-AMG M159 6.2 L V8	111	+12 laps
17	GTD Pro	5	25	(United States) BMW M Team RLL	(United States) John Edwards (United States) Connor De Phillippi	BMW M4 GT3	111	+12 Laps
17	GTD Pro	5	25	(United States) BMW M Team RLL	(United States) John Edwards (United States) Connor De Phillippi	BMW S58B30T0 3.0 L Twin Turbo I6	111	+12 Laps
18	GTD	3	51	(Philippines) RWR with Eurasia Motorsport	(Australia) Aidan Read (United States) Ryan Eversley	Acura NSX GT3 Evo22	111	+12 Laps
18	GTD	3	51	(Philippines) RWR with Eurasia Motorsport	(Australia) Aidan Read (United States) Ryan Eversley	Acura 3.5 L Turbo V6	111	+12 Laps
19	GTD Pro	6	14	(United States) Vasser Sullivan Racing	(United Kingdom) Ben Barnicoat (Japan) Kamui Kobayashi	Lexus RC F GT3	111	+12 Laps
19	GTD Pro	6	14	(United States) Vasser Sullivan Racing	(United Kingdom) Ben Barnicoat (Japan) Kamui Kobayashi	Toyota 2UR 5.0 L V8	111	+12 Laps
20	GTD	4	96	(United States) Turner Motorsport	(United States) Robby Foley (United States) Bill Auberlen	BMW M4 GT3	111	+12 Laps
20	GTD	4	96	(United States) Turner Motorsport	(United States) Robby Foley (United States) Bill Auberlen	BMW S58B30T0 3.0 L Twin Turbo I6	111	+12 Laps
21	GTD	5	1	(United States) Paul Miller Racing	(United States) Madison Snow (United States) Bryan Sellers	BMW M4 GT3	111	+12 Laps
21	GTD	5	1	(United States) Paul Miller Racing	(United States) Madison Snow (United States) Bryan Sellers	BMW S58B30T0 3.0 L Twin Turbo I6	111	+12 Laps
22 DNF	GTD	6	12	(United States) Vasser Sullivan Racing	(United States) Frankie Montecalvo (United States) Aaron Telitz	Lexus RC F GT3	80	Accident Damage
22 DNF	GTD	6	12	(United States) Vasser Sullivan Racing	(United States) Frankie Montecalvo (United States) Aaron Telitz	Toyota 2UR 5.0 L V8	80	Accident Damage
23 DNF	LMP3	5	74	(United States) Riley Motorsports	(United States) Gar Robinson (Australia) Scott Andrews	Ligier JS P320	74	Accident
23 DNF	LMP3	5	74	(United States) Riley Motorsports	(United States) Gar Robinson (Australia) Scott Andrews	Nissan VK56DE 5.6 L V8	74	Accident
24 DNF	LMP3	6	33	(United States) Sean Creech Motorsport	(United States) Lance Willsey (Portugal) João Barbosa	Ligier JS P320	32	Accident
24 DNF	LMP3	6	33	(United States) Sean Creech Motorsport	(United States) Lance Willsey (Portugal) João Barbosa	Nissan VK56DE 5.6 L V8	32	Accident

== Standings after the race ==
DPi Drivers' Championship standings
Pos.	+/–	Driver	Points
1	1	(United Kingdom) Tom Blomqvist (United Kingdom) Oliver Jarvis	2737
2	1	(Portugal) Filipe Albuquerque (United States) Ricky Taylor	2681
3	1	(France) Sébastien Bourdais (Netherlands) Renger van der Zande	2589
4	1	(United Kingdom) Alex Lynn (New Zealand) Earl Bamber	2547
5		(Brazil) Pipo Derani	2463

LMP2 Drivers' Championship standings
Pos.	+/–	Driver	Points
1		(Canada) John Farano	1294
2		(Colombia) Juan Pablo Montoya (Sweden) Henrik Hedman	1257
3		(United States) Steven Thomas (United States) Jonathan Bomarito	1232
4		(United Kingdom) Ryan Dalziel (United States) Dwight Merriman	1227
5		(Denmark) Dennis Andersen (Denmark) Anders Fjordbach	1188

LMP3 Drivers' Championship standings
Pos.	+/–	Driver	Points
1		(United States) Jon Bennett (United States) Colin Braun	1391
2		(Canada) Garett Grist (United States) Ari Balogh	1293
3		(United States) Gar Robinson	1253
4		(Portugal) João Barbosa (United States) Lance Willsey	1203
5	3	(United States) Jarett Andretti (Colombia) Gabby Chaves	1122

GTD Pro Drivers' Championship standings
Pos.	+/–	Driver	Points
1		(Australia) Matt Campbell (France) Mathieu Jaminet	2056
2	1	(Spain) Antonio García (United States) Jordan Taylor	1918
3	1	(United Kingdom) Ben Barnicoat	1849
4		(United Kingdom) Ross Gunn (Spain) Alex Riberas	1820
5		(United States) Cooper MacNeil	1701

GTD Drivers' Championship standings
Pos.	+/–	Driver	Points
1		(United Kingdom) Stevan McAleer	1765‡
2		(United States) Ryan Hardwick (Belgium) Jan Heylen	1760‡
3		(United States) Bill Auberlen (United States) Robby Foley	1721‡
4		(Canada) Roman De Angelis	1660‡
5		(United States) Robert Megennis (United States) Jeff Westphal	1549‡

- Note: Only the top five positions are included for all sets of standings.
- ‡: Points count towards WeatherTech Sprint Cup championship only.

DPi Teams' Championship standings
Pos.	+/–	Team	Points
1	1	(United States) #60 Meyer Shank Racing w/ Curb-Agajanian	2737
2	1	(United States) #10 WTR - Konica Minolta Acura	2681
3	1	(United States) #01 Cadillac Racing	2589
4	1	(United States) #02 Cadillac Racing	2547
5		(United States) #31 Whelen Engineering Racing	2463

LMP2 Teams' Championship standings
Pos.	+/–	Team	Points
1		(United States) #52 PR1/Mathiasen Motorsports	1367
2		(United States) #8 Tower Motorsport	1294
3		(United States) #81 DragonSpeed USA	1257
4		(United States) #11 PR1/Mathiasen Motorsports	1232
5		(United States) #18 Era Motorsport	1227

LMP3 Teams' Championship standings
Pos.	+/–	Team	Points
1		(United States) #54 CORE Autosport	1391
2		(United States) #30 Jr III Motorsports	1293
3		(United States) #74 Riley Motorsports	1253
4		(United States) #33 Sean Creech Motorsport	1203
5	2	(United States) #36 Andretti Autosport	1122

GTD Pro Teams' Championship standings
Pos.	+/–	Team	Points
1		(Canada) #9 Pfaff Motorsports	2056
2	1	(United States) #3 Corvette Racing	1918
3	1	(United States) #14 Vasser Sullivan Racing	1849
4		(United States) #23 Heart of Racing Team	1820
5		(United States) #79 WeatherTech Racing	1701

GTD Teams' Championship standings
Pos.	+/–	Team	Points
1		(United States) #32 Gilbert Korthoff Motorsports	1765‡
2		(United States) #16 Wright Motorsports	1760‡
3		(United States) #96 Turner Motorsport	1721‡
4		(United States) #27 Heart of Racing Team	1660‡
5		(United States) #39 CarBahn with Peregrine Racing	1549‡

- Note: Only the top five positions are included for all sets of standings.
- ‡: Points count towards WeatherTech Sprint Cup championship only.

DPi Manufacturers' Championship standings
Pos.	+/–	Manufacturer	Points
1		(Japan) Acura	2948
2		(United States) Cadillac	2948

GTD Pro Manufacturers' Championship standings
Pos.	+/–	Manufacturer	Points
1		(Germany) Porsche	2056
2	1	(United States) Chevrolet	1928
3	1	(United Kingdom) Aston Martin	1890
4	2	(Japan) Lexus	1879
5	1	(Germany) Mercedes-AMG	1809

GTD Manufacturers' Championship standings
Pos.	+/–	Manufacturer	Points
1		(Germany) BMW	1949‡
2		(United Kingdom) Aston Martin	1931‡
3		(Germany) Mercedes-AMG	1880‡
4		(Germany) Porsche	1857‡
5		(Japan) Lexus	1769‡

- Note: Only the top five positions are included for all sets of standings.
- ‡: Points count towards WeatherTech Sprint Cup championship only.

IMSA SportsCar Championship
Previous race: 2022 Sahlen's Six Hours of The Glen	2022 season	Next race: 2022 Northeast Grand Prix
