= 2022 GT Challenge at VIR =

Track map of VIR

The 2022 GT Challenge at VIR (known as the 2022 Michelin GT Challenge at VIR for sponsorship reasons) was a sports car race sanctioned by the International Motor Sports Association (IMSA). The race was held at Virginia International Raceway in Alton, Virginia on August 28, 2022. The race was the eleventh round of the 2022 IMSA SportsCar Championship, and the eighth round of the WeatherTech Sprint Cup.

== Background ==
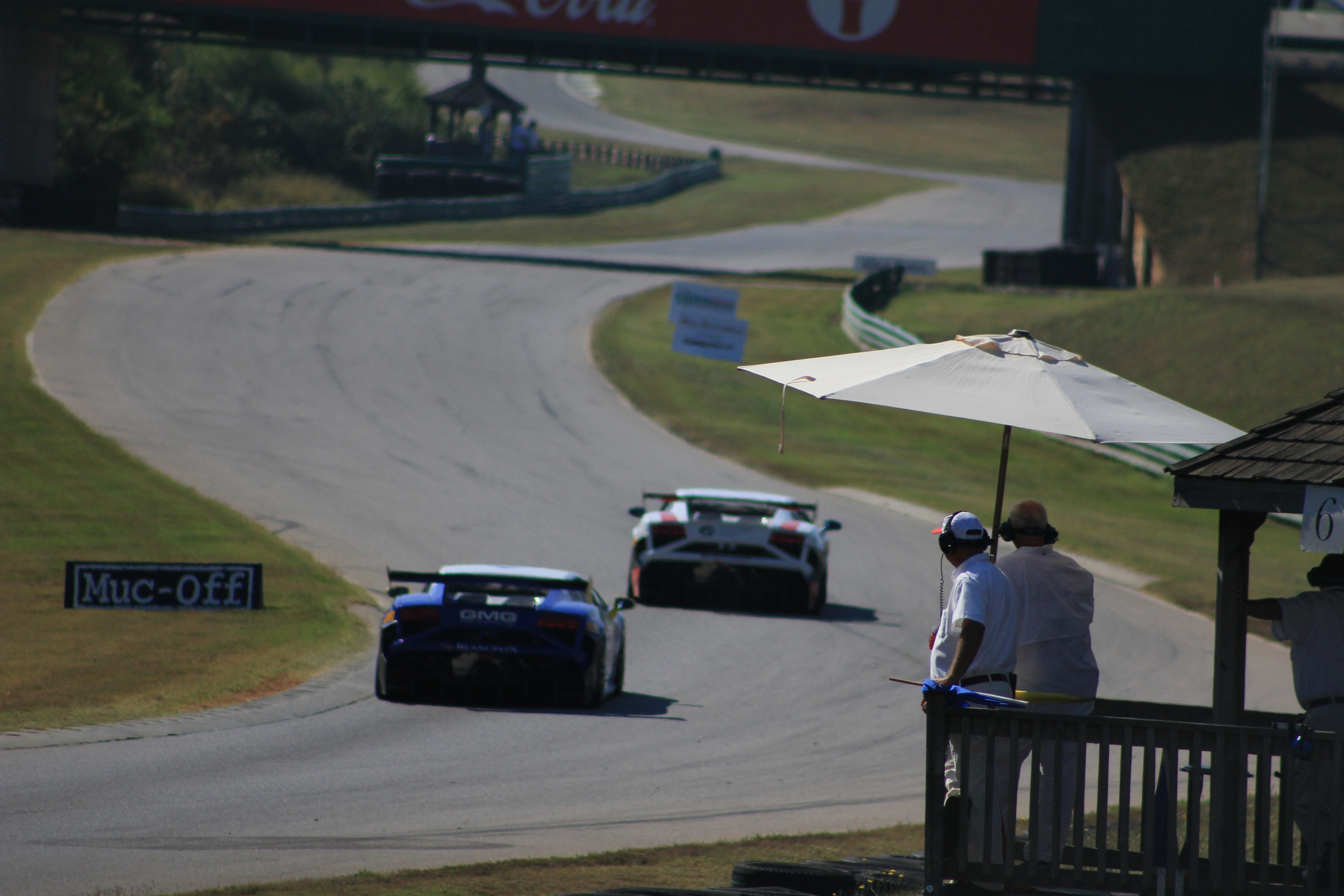
Virginia International Raceway, where the race was held.

International Motor Sports Association's (IMSA) president John Doonan confirmed the race was part of the schedule for the 2022 IMSA SportsCar Championship (IMSA SCC) in August 2021. It was the ninth consecutive year the event was held as part of the WeatherTech SportsCar Championship. The 2022 GT Challenge at VIR was the eleventh of twelve scheduled sports car races of 2022 by IMSA, and it was the last of eight rounds held as part of the WeatherTech Sprint Cup. The race was held at the seventeen-turn 3.270 mi (5.263 km) Virginia International Raceway in Alton, Virginia on August 28, 2022.

As in previous years, it would be the second of two GT-only rounds of the IMSA SportsCar Championship, in which only the GTD Pro and GTD classes competed. After the previous years edition was moved to October, the race returned to its traditional date of August.

The No. 9 Pfaff Motorsports entry entered the event as defending GTD-class winners, while the GTD Pro class would compete at Virginia International Raceway for the first time in class history.

Before the race, Matt Campbell and Mathieu Jaminet led the GTD Pro Drivers' Championship with 2793 points; the duo held a 227 point lead over Ben Barnicoat. With 2329 points, Stevan McAleer led the GTD Drivers' Championship by 36 points over Ryan Hardwick and Jan Heylen in second while Roman De Angelis was third with 2285 points. Porsche and BMW were leading their respective Manufactures' Championships while Pfaff Motorsports and Gilbert Korthoff Motorsports each led their own Teams' Championships.

=== Entries ===
A total of 18 cars took part in the event split across two classes. 5 cars were entered in GTD Pro and 13 in GTD. In GTD, Magnus Racing and Team Hardpoint made their first appearances since the Watkins Glen round. Jules Gounon joined Cooper MacNeil in the WeatherTech Racing entry. No changes happened in GTD Pro.

== Practice ==
There were two practice sessions preceding the start of the race on Sunday; one on Friday and one on Saturday. The first session on Friday afternoon ran for 60 minutes while the second session on Saturday morning lasted 90 minutes.

=== Practice 1 ===
The first practice session took place at 3:50 pm ET on Friday and ended with Connor De Phillippi topping the charts for BMW M Team RLL, with a lap time of 1:45.196.

Pos.	Class	No.	Team	Driver	Time	Gap
1	GTD Pro	25	BMW M Team RLL	Connor De Phillippi	1:45.196	_
2	GTD	32	Team Korthoff Motorsports	Mike Skeen	1:45.348	+0.152
3	GTD	16	Wright Motorsports	Jan Heylen	1:45.390	+0.194

=== Practice 2 ===
The second and final practice session took place at 10:40 am ET on Saturday and ended with Jack Hawksworth topping the charts for Vasser Sullivan Racing, with a lap time of 1:43.984.

Pos.	Class	No.	Team	Driver	Time	Gap
1	GTD Pro	14	Vasser Sullivan Racing	Jack Hawksworth	1:43.984	_
2	GTD	51	Rick Ware Racing	Aidan Read	1:44.518	+0.534
3	GTD	96	Turner Motorsport	Bill Auberlen	1:44.610	+0.626

== Qualifying ==
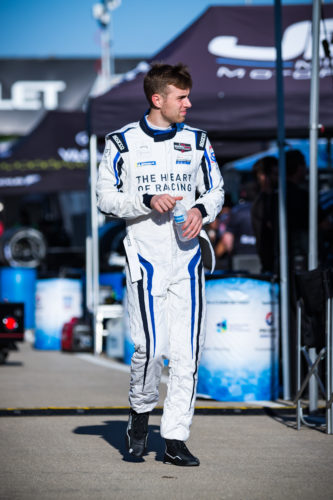
Ross Gunn (pictured in 2021) took the overall pole position for Heart of Racing Team.

Saturday's afternoon qualifying was broken into one session for the GTD Pro and GTD classes, which lasted for 15 minutes. The rules dictated that all teams nominated a driver to qualify their cars, with the Pro-Am (GTD) class requiring a Bronze/Silver Rated Driver to qualify the car. The competitors' fastest lap times determined the starting order.

Ross Gunn took overall pole for Heart of Racing Team, while Russell Ward and Winward Racing scored pole in GTD.

=== Qualifying results ===
Pole positions in each class are indicated in bold and by ‡.

Pos.	Class	No.	Team	Driver	Time	Gap	Grid
1	**GTD Pro**	**23**	**(United States) Heart of Racing Team**	**(United Kingdom) Ross Gunn**	**1:43.953**	**_**	1‡
2	GTD Pro	3	(United States) Corvette Racing	(Spain) Antonio Garcia	1:44.667	+0.714	2
3	GTD Pro	9	(Canada) Pfaff Motorsports	(Australia) Matt Campbell	1:44.719	+0.766	3
4	GTD Pro	25	(United States) BMW M Team RLL	(United States) Connor De Phillippi	1:44.791	+0.838	4
5	GTD Pro	14	(United States) Vasser Sullivan Racing	(United Kingdom) Jack Hawksworth	1:44.890	+0.937	5
6	**GTD**	**57**	**(United States) Winward Racing**	**(United States) Russell Ward**	**1:45.010**	**+1.057**	6‡
7	GTD	51	(United States) Rick Ware Racing	(Australia) Aidan Read	1:45.077	+1.124	7
8	GTD	1	(United States) Paul Miller Racing	(United States) Madison Snow	1:45.081	+1.128	8
9	GTD	39	(United States) CarBahn with Peregrine Racing	(United States) Robert Megennis	1:45.155	+1.202	9
10	GTD	32	(United States) Team Korthoff Motorsports	(United States) Mike Skeen	1:45.328	+1.375	10
11	GTD	27	(United States) Heart of Racing Team	(Canada) Roman De Angelis	1:45.402	+1.449	11
12	GTD	96	(United States) Turner Motorsport	(United States) Robby Foley	1:45.490	+1.537	12
13	GTD	12	(United States) Vasser Sullivan Racing	(United States) Frankie Montecalvo	1:45.830	+1.877	13
14	GTD	42	(United States) NTE Sport/SSR	(United States) Jaden Conwright	1:45.965	+2.012	14
15	GTD	79	(United States) WeatherTech Racing	(United States) Cooper MacNeil	1:46.648	+2.695	15
16	GTD	16	(United States) Wright Motorsports	(United States) Ryan Hardwick	1:46.763	+2.810	16
17	GTD	99	(United States) Team Hardpoint	(United States) Rob Ferriol	1:47.266	+3.313	17
18	GTD	44	(United States) Magnus Racing	(United States) John Potter	1:47.905	+3.952	18

== Race ==
=== Post-Race ===
With 3173 points, Campbell and Jaminet's victory allowed them to extend their advantage to 265 points as García and Taylor took over second position in the GTD Pro Drivers' Championship. As a result of finishing second place, De Angelis took the lead of the GTD Drivers' Championship with 2630 points while McAleer dropped to second. Ellis and Ward jumped to fourth after being sixth coming into Virginia International Raceway. Porsche and BMW continued to top their respective Manufacturers' Championships, while Pfaff Motorsports kept their advantage in the GTD Pro Teams' Championship. Heart of Racing Team took the lead of the GTD Teams' Championship with 1 round remaining.

=== Race results ===
Class winners are denoted in bold and ‡.

Pos	Class	No.	Team	Drivers	Chassis	Laps	Time/Retired
Pos	Class	No.	Team	Drivers	Engine	Laps	Time/Retired
1	**GTD Pro**	**9**	**(Canada) Pfaff Motorsports**	**(Australia) Matt Campbell (France) Mathieu Jaminet**	**Porsche 911 GT3 R**	**86**	**2:40:37.906‡**
1	**GTD Pro**	**9**	**(Canada) Pfaff Motorsports**	**(Australia) Matt Campbell (France) Mathieu Jaminet**	**Porsche 4.0 L Flat-6**	**86**	**2:40:37.906‡**
2	GTD Pro	3	(United States) Corvette Racing	(Spain) Antonio García (United States) Jordan Taylor	Chevrolet Corvette C8.R GTD	86	+0.823
2	GTD Pro	3	(United States) Corvette Racing	(Spain) Antonio García (United States) Jordan Taylor	Chevrolet 5.5L V8	86	+0.823
3	**GTD**	**57**	**(United States) Winward Racing**	**(United Kingdom) Philip Ellis (United States) Russell Ward**	**Mercedes-AMG GT3 Evo**	**86**	**+4.463‡**
3	**GTD**	**57**	**(United States) Winward Racing**	**(United Kingdom) Philip Ellis (United States) Russell Ward**	**Mercedes-AMG M159 6.2 L V8**	**86**	**+4.463‡**
4	GTD	27	(United States) Heart of Racing Team	(Canada) Roman De Angelis (Belgium) Maxime Martin	Aston Martin Vantage AMR GT3	86	+10.799
4	GTD	27	(United States) Heart of Racing Team	(Canada) Roman De Angelis (Belgium) Maxime Martin	Aston Martin 4.0 L Turbo V8	86	+10.799
5	GTD	1	(United States) Paul Miller Racing	(United States) Bryan Sellers (United States) Madison Snow	BMW M4 GT3	86	+12.960
5	GTD	1	(United States) Paul Miller Racing	(United States) Bryan Sellers (United States) Madison Snow	BMW S58B30T0 3.0 L Twin Turbo I6	86	+12.960
6	GTD	12	(United States) Vasser Sullivan Racing	(United States) Frankie Montecalvo (United States) Aaron Telitz	Lexus RC F GT3	86	+14.475
6	GTD	12	(United States) Vasser Sullivan Racing	(United States) Frankie Montecalvo (United States) Aaron Telitz	Toyota 2UR 5.0 L V8	86	+14.475
7	GTD	16	(United States) Wright Motorsports	(United States) Ryan Hardwick (Belgium) Jan Heylen	Porsche 911 GT3 R	86	+15.136
7	GTD	16	(United States) Wright Motorsports	(United States) Ryan Hardwick (Belgium) Jan Heylen	Porsche 4.0 L Flat-6	86	+15.136
8	GTD	79	(United States) WeatherTech Racing	(United States) Cooper MacNeil (France) Jules Gounon	Mercedes-AMG GT3 Evo	86	+15.545
8	GTD	79	(United States) WeatherTech Racing	(United States) Cooper MacNeil (France) Jules Gounon	Mercedes-AMG M159 6.2 L V8	86	+15.545
9	GTD Pro	14	(United States) Vasser Sullivan Racing	(United Kingdom) Ben Barnicoat (United Kingdom) Jack Hawksworth	Lexus RC F GT3	86	+18.029
9	GTD Pro	14	(United States) Vasser Sullivan Racing	(United Kingdom) Ben Barnicoat (United Kingdom) Jack Hawksworth	Toyota 2UR 5.0 L V8	86	+18.029
10	GTD	96	(United States) Turner Motorsport	(United States) Bill Auberlen (United States) Robby Foley	BMW M4 GT3	86	+25.791
10	GTD	96	(United States) Turner Motorsport	(United States) Bill Auberlen (United States) Robby Foley	BMW S58B30T0 3.0 L Twin Turbo I6	86	+25.791
11	GTD Pro	23	(United States) Heart of Racing Team	(United Kingdom) Ross Gunn (Spain) Alex Riberas	Aston Martin Vantage AMR GT3	86	+43.249
11	GTD Pro	23	(United States) Heart of Racing Team	(United Kingdom) Ross Gunn (Spain) Alex Riberas	Aston Martin 4.0 L Turbo V8	86	+43.249
12	GTD	32	(United States) Team Korthoff Motorsports	(United Kingdom) Stevan McAleer (United States) Mike Skeen	Mercedes-AMG GT3 Evo	86	+46.179
12	GTD	32	(United States) Team Korthoff Motorsports	(United Kingdom) Stevan McAleer (United States) Mike Skeen	Mercedes-AMG M159 6.2 L V8	86	+46.179
13	GTD Pro	25	(United States) BMW M Team RLL	(United States) John Edwards (United States) Connor De Phillippi	BMW M4 GT3	86	+54.079
13	GTD Pro	25	(United States) BMW M Team RLL	(United States) John Edwards (United States) Connor De Phillippi	BMW S58B30T0 3.0 L Twin Turbo I6	86	+54.079
14	GTD	51	(United States) Rick Ware Racing	(United States) Ryan Eversley (Australia) Aidan Read	Acura NSX GT3 Evo22	86	+1:10.978
14	GTD	51	(United States) Rick Ware Racing	(United States) Ryan Eversley (Australia) Aidan Read	Acura 3.5 L Turbo V6	86	+1:10.978
15	GTD	99	(United States) Team Hardpoint	(United States) Rob Ferriol (United Kingdom) Katherine Legge	Porsche 911 GT3 R	86	+1:11.397
15	GTD	99	(United States) Team Hardpoint	(United States) Rob Ferriol (United Kingdom) Katherine Legge	Porsche 4.0 L Flat-6	86	+1:11.397
16	GTD	39	(United States) CarBahn with Peregrine Racing	(United States) Robert Megennis (United States) Jeff Westphal	Lamborghini Huracán GT3 Evo	86	+1:38.629
16	GTD	39	(United States) CarBahn with Peregrine Racing	(United States) Robert Megennis (United States) Jeff Westphal	Lamborghini 5.2 L V10	86	+1:38.629
17	GTD	44	(United States) Magnus Racing	(United States) John Potter (United States) Andy Lally	Aston Martin Vantage AMR GT3	85	+1 Lap
17	GTD	44	(United States) Magnus Racing	(United States) John Potter (United States) Andy Lally	Aston Martin 4.0 L Turbo V8	85	+1 Lap
18 DNF	GTD	42	(United States) NTE Sport/SSR	(Germany) Marco Holzer (United States) Jaden Conwright	Lamborghini Huracán GT3 Evo	1	Did Not Finish
18 DNF	GTD	42	(United States) NTE Sport/SSR	(Germany) Marco Holzer (United States) Jaden Conwright	Lamborghini 5.2 L V10	1	Did Not Finish

== Standings after the race ==
DPi Drivers' Championship standings
Pos.	+/–	Driver	Points
1		(Portugal) Filipe Albuquerque (United States) Ricky Taylor	3066
2		(United Kingdom) Tom Blomqvist (United Kingdom) Oliver Jarvis	3047
3		(France) Sébastien Bourdais (Netherlands) Renger van der Zande	2914
4		(United Kingdom) Alex Lynn (New Zealand) Earl Bamber	2899
5		(Brazil) Pipo Derani	2739

LMP2 Drivers' Championship standings
Pos.	+/–	Driver	Points
1		(Canada) John Farano	1640
2		(United Kingdom) Ryan Dalziel (United States) Dwight Merriman	1607
3		(United States) Steven Thomas	1547
4		(Colombia) Juan Pablo Montoya (Sweden) Henrik Hedman	1532
5		(Denmark) Dennis Andersen (Denmark) Anders Fjordbach	1516

LMP3 Drivers' Championship standings
Pos.	+/–	Driver	Points
1		(United States) Jon Bennett (United States) Colin Braun	1716
2		(United States) Gar Robinson	1633
3		(Canada) Garett Grist (United States) Ari Balogh	1597
4		(Portugal) João Barbosa	1458
5		(Canada) Orey Fidani	1448

GTD Pro Drivers' Championship standings
Pos.	+/–	Driver	Points
1		(Australia) Matt Campbell (France) Mathieu Jaminet	3173
2	1	(Spain) Antonio García (United States) Jordan Taylor	2908
3	1	(United Kingdom) Ben Barnicoat	2892
4		(United Kingdom) Ross Gunn (Spain) Alex Riberas	2791
5		(United States) Connor De Phillippi (United States) John Edwards	2522

GTD Drivers' Championship standings
Pos.	+/–	Driver	Points
1	2	(Canada) Roman De Angelis	2630
2	1	(United Kingdom) Stevan McAleer	2585
3	1	(United States) Ryan Hardwick (Belgium) Jan Heylen	2573
4	2	(United Kingdom) Phillip Ellis (United States) Russell Ward	2490
5		(United States) Bill Auberlen (United States) Robby Foley	2468

- Note: Only the top five positions are included for all sets of standings.

DPi Teams' Championship standings
Pos.	+/–	Team	Points
1		(United States) #10 WTR - Konica Minolta Acura	3066
2		(United States) #60 Meyer Shank Racing w/ Curb-Agajanian	3047
3		(United States) #01 Cadillac Racing	2914
4		(United States) #02 Cadillac Racing	2899
5		(United States) #31 Whelen Engineering Racing	2739

LMP2 Teams' Championship standings
Pos.	+/–	Team	Points
1		(United States) #52 PR1/Mathiasen Motorsports	1659
2		(United States) #8 Tower Motorsport	1640
3		(United States) #18 Era Motorsport	1607
4		(United States) #11 PR1/Mathiasen Motorsports	1547
5		(United States) #81 DragonSpeed USA	1532

LMP3 Teams' Championship standings
Pos.	+/–	Team	Points
1		(United States) #54 CORE Autosport	1716
2		(United States) #74 Riley Motorsports	1633
3		(United States) #30 Jr III Motorsports	1597
4		(United States) #33 Sean Creech Motorsport	1458
5		(Canada) #13 AWA	1448

GTD Pro Teams' Championship standings
Pos.	+/–	Team	Points
1		(Canada) #9 Pfaff Motorsports	3173
2	1	(United States) #3 Corvette Racing	2908
3	1	(United States) #14 Vasser Sullivan Racing	2892
4		(United States) #23 Heart of Racing Team	2791
5		(United States) #25 BMW M Team RLL	2522

GTD Teams' Championship standings
Pos.	+/–	Team	Points
1	2	(United States) #27 Heart of Racing Team	2630
2	1	(United States) #32 Team Korthoff Motorsports	2585
3	1	(United States) #16 Wright Motorsports	2573
4	2	(United States) #57 Winward Racing	2490
5		(United States) #96 Turner Motorsport	2468

- Note: Only the top five positions are included for all sets of standings.

DPi Manufacturers' Championship standings
Pos.	+/–	Manufacturer	Points
1		(Japan) Acura	3333
2		(United States) Cadillac	3300

GTD Pro Manufacturers' Championship standings
Pos.	+/–	Manufacturer	Points
1		(Germany) Porsche	3173
2		(Japan) Lexus	2922
3		(United States) Chevrolet	2918
4		(United Kingdom) Aston Martin	2861
5		(Germany) BMW	2607

GTD Manufacturers' Championship standings
Pos.	+/–	Manufacturer	Points
1		(Germany) BMW	2972
2	1	(Germany) Mercedes-AMG	2949
3	1	(United Kingdom) Aston Martin	2913
4		(Italy) Lamborghini	2709
5		(Germany) Porsche	2700

- Note: Only the top five positions are included for all sets of standings.

IMSA SportsCar Championship
Previous race: 2022 IMSA SportsCar Weekend	2022 season	Next race: 2022 Petit Le Mans
