= 2019 Oak Tree Grand Prix =

Tenth round of the 2019 IMSA SportsCar Championship season

Track map of VIR

The 2019 Michelin GT Challenge at VIR was a sports car race sanctioned by the International Motor Sports Association (IMSA). The race was held at Virginia International Raceway in Alton, Virginia, on August 25, 2019. The race was the tenth round of the 2019 IMSA SportsCar Championship, and the sixth round of the WeatherTech Sprint Cup. Nick Tandy and Patrick Pilet won the race overall in the #911 Porsche GT Team Porsche 911 RSR leading home a 1-2 for Porsche who clinched the GTLM manufactures championship. In GTD, the #33 Mercedes-AMG Team Riley Motorsports of Ben Keating and Jeroen Bleekemolen took their first win of the season.

== Background ==
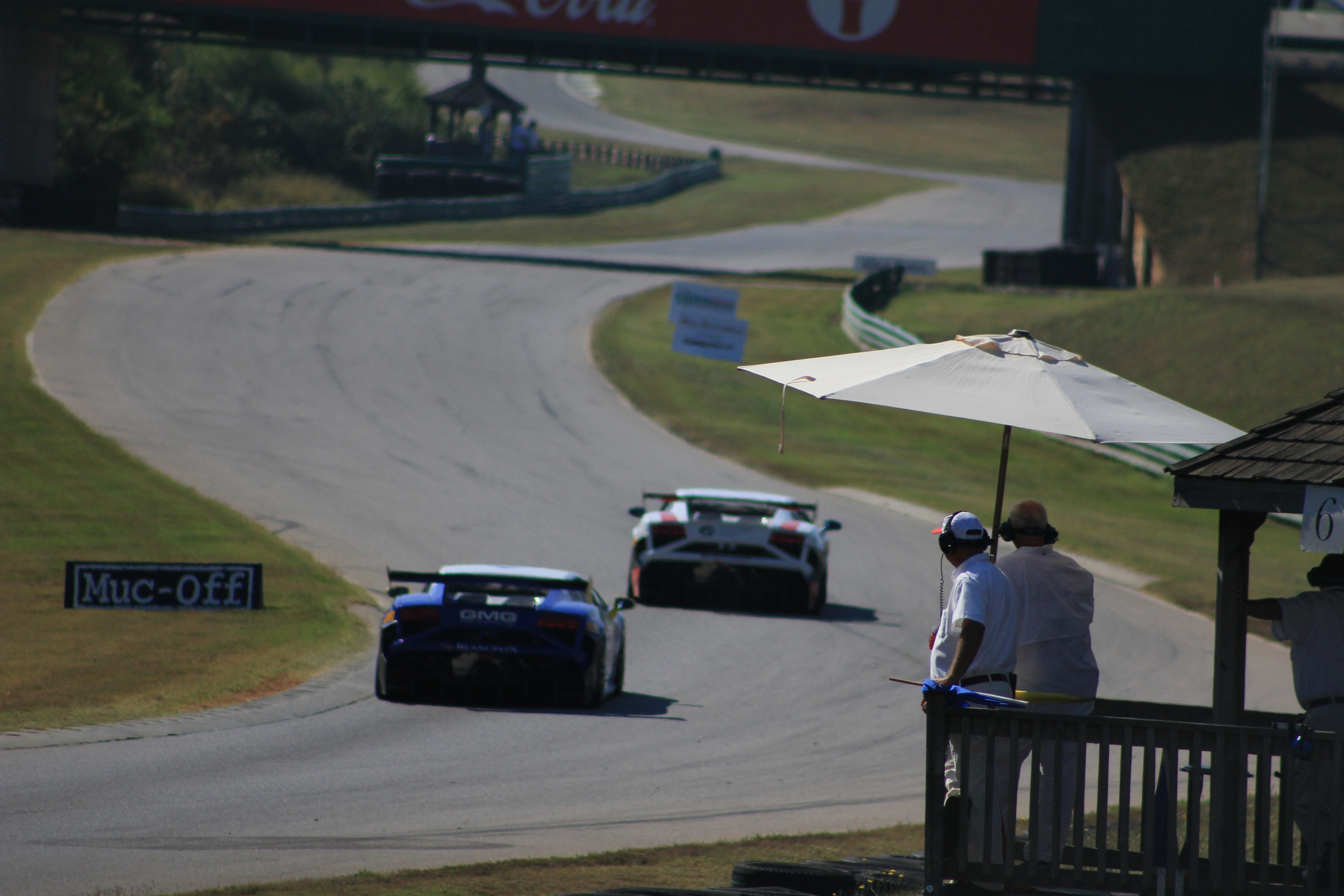
Virginia International Raceway, where the race was held.

International Motor Sports Association's (IMSA) president Scott Atherton confirmed the race was part of the schedule for the 2019 IMSA SportsCar Championship (IMSA SCC) in August 2018. It was the sixth consecutive year the event was held as part of the WeatherTech SportsCar Championship. The 2019 Oak Tree Grand Prix was the tenth of twelve sports car races of 2019 by IMSA, and it was the sixth of seven rounds held as part of the WeatherTech Sprint Cup. The race was held at the seventeen-turn 3.270 mi (5.263 km) Virginia International Raceway in Alton, Virginia on August 25, 2019. As in previous years, it would be the second of two GT-only rounds of the IMSA SportsCar Championship, in which only the GTLM and GTD classes competed.

On August 15, 2019, IMSA released a technical bulletin regarding the Balance of Performance for the race. In GT Le Mans, The Ford GT received a 5 kilogram weight increase, and gained 10 horsepower. The BMW M8 GTE received a 6.5 horsepower reduction and fuel capacity reduction of 1 liter. In GTD, the Audi R8 LMS GT3 Evo and Ferrari 488 GT3 were given weight reductions of 20 and 10 kilograms respectively, while the McLaren 720S GT3 got a fuel capacity reduction of 4 liters.

Before the race, Earl Bamber and Laurens Vanthoor led the GTLM Drivers' Championship with 248 points, 14 points ahead of Patrick Pilet and Nick Tandy in second followed by Ryan Briscoe and Richard Westbrook with 230 points in third. In GTD, Mario Farnbacher and Trent Hindman led the Drivers' Championship with 209 points; the duo held a thirty-six point advantage over Bill Auberlen and Robby Foley in second. Porsche an Acura were leading their respective Manufacturers' Championships, while Porsche GT Team and Meyer Shank Racing each led their own Teams' Championships.

=== Entries ===
A total of 21 cars took part in the event split across two classes. 8 cars were entered in GTLM, and 13 in GTD. In GTD, Scott Hargrove returned to Pfaff Motorsports after Dennis Olsen and Matt Campbell filled in the previous two rounds. Due to a scheduling conflict for Christina Nielsen, who was at Suzuka International Racing Course for the Suzuka 10 Hours, was replaced by Alice Powell. Starworks Motorsport withdrew from the event following continued performance issues with its Audi R8 after competing at Road America. No changes happened in GTLM.

== Practice ==
There were three practice sessions preceding the start of the race on Saturday, two on Friday and one on Saturday. The first session on Friday morning lasted one hour while the second session on Friday afternoon lasted one hour. The third on Saturday morning lasted one hour.

=== Practice 1 ===
The first practice session took place at 11:45 am ET on Friday and ended with Laurens Vanthoor topping the charts for Porsche GT Team, with a lap time of 1:41.296. Nick Tandy was second fastest in the sister No. 911 Porsche followed by Ryan Briscoe's No. 67 Ford GT in third position. Dirk Müller in the No. 66 Ford GT was fourth fastest and Jan Magnussen's No. 3 Corvette rounded out the top five. The GTD class was topped by the No. 33 Mercedes-AMG Team Riley Motorsports Mercedes-AMG GT3 of Ben Keating with a time of 1:44.336. Patrick Long was second fastest in the No. 73 Park Place Motorsports Porsche followed by Andy Lally in the No. 44 Magnus Racing Lamborghini in third position.

| Pos. | Class | No. | Team | Driver | Time | Gap |
|---|---|---|---|---|---|---|
| 1 | GTLM | 912 | Porsche GT Team | Laurens Vanthoor | 1:41.296 | _ |
| 2 | GTLM | 911 | Porsche GT Team | Nick Tandy | 1:41.435 | +0.139 |
| 3 | GTLM | 67 | Ford Chip Ganassi Racing | Ryan Briscoe | 1:41.478 | +0.182 |

=== Practice 2 ===
The second practice session took place at 4:30 PM ET on Friday and ended with Patrick Pilet topping the charts for Porsche GT Team, with a lap time of 1:41.234. Antonio García was second fastest in the No. 3 Corvette followed by Earl Bamber in the No. 912 Porsche in third. Richard Westbrook in the No. 67 Ford GT was fourth fastest and Jesse Krohn's No. 24 BMW rounded out the top five. The GTD class was topped by the No.14 AIM Vasser Sullivan Lexus RC F GT3 of Jack Hawksworth with a time of 1:43.783. Robby Foley was second fastest in the No. 96 BMW followed by Bryan Sellers in the No. 48 Paul Miller Racing Lamborghini in third position. The session was disrupted when the No. 44 Magnus Racing Lamborghini of Andy Lally stopped on track with a mechanical problem.

| Pos. | Class | No. | Team | Driver | Time | Gap |
|---|---|---|---|---|---|---|
| 1 | GTLM | 911 | Porsche GT Team | Patrick Pilet | 1:41.234 | _ |
| 2 | GTLM | 3 | Corvette Racing | Antonio García | 1:41.324 | +0.090 |
| 3 | GTLM | 912 | Porsche GT Team | Earl Bamber | 1:41.337 | +0.103 |

=== Practice 3 ===
The third and final practice session took place at 8:35 am ET Saturday was held on a wet track. Vanthoor's No. 912 Porsche lapped fastest at 2:00.631, ahead of Nick Tandy in the No. 911 Porsche. Joey Hand was third in the No. 66 Ford GT followed by Connor De Phillippi's No. 25 BMW in fourth, and Magnussen's No. 3 Corvette rounded out the top five. GTD was led by Jeroen Bleekemolen's No. 33 Mercedes-AMG with a lap of 2:03.544. Lally was second-fastest and had the categories fastest time for most of the session. Richard Heistand was third fastest in the No. 14 Lexus followed by Toni Vilander's No. 63 Ferrari in fourth.

| Pos. | Class | No. | Team | Driver | Time | Gap |
|---|---|---|---|---|---|---|
| 1 | GTLM | 912 | Porsche GT Team | Laurens Vanthoor | 2:00.631 | _ |
| 2 | GTLM | 911 | Porsche GT Team | Nick Tandy | 2:00.938 | +0.307 |
| 3 | GTLM | 66 | Ford Chip Ganassi Racing | Joey Hand | 2:01.262 | +0.631 |

== Qualifying ==
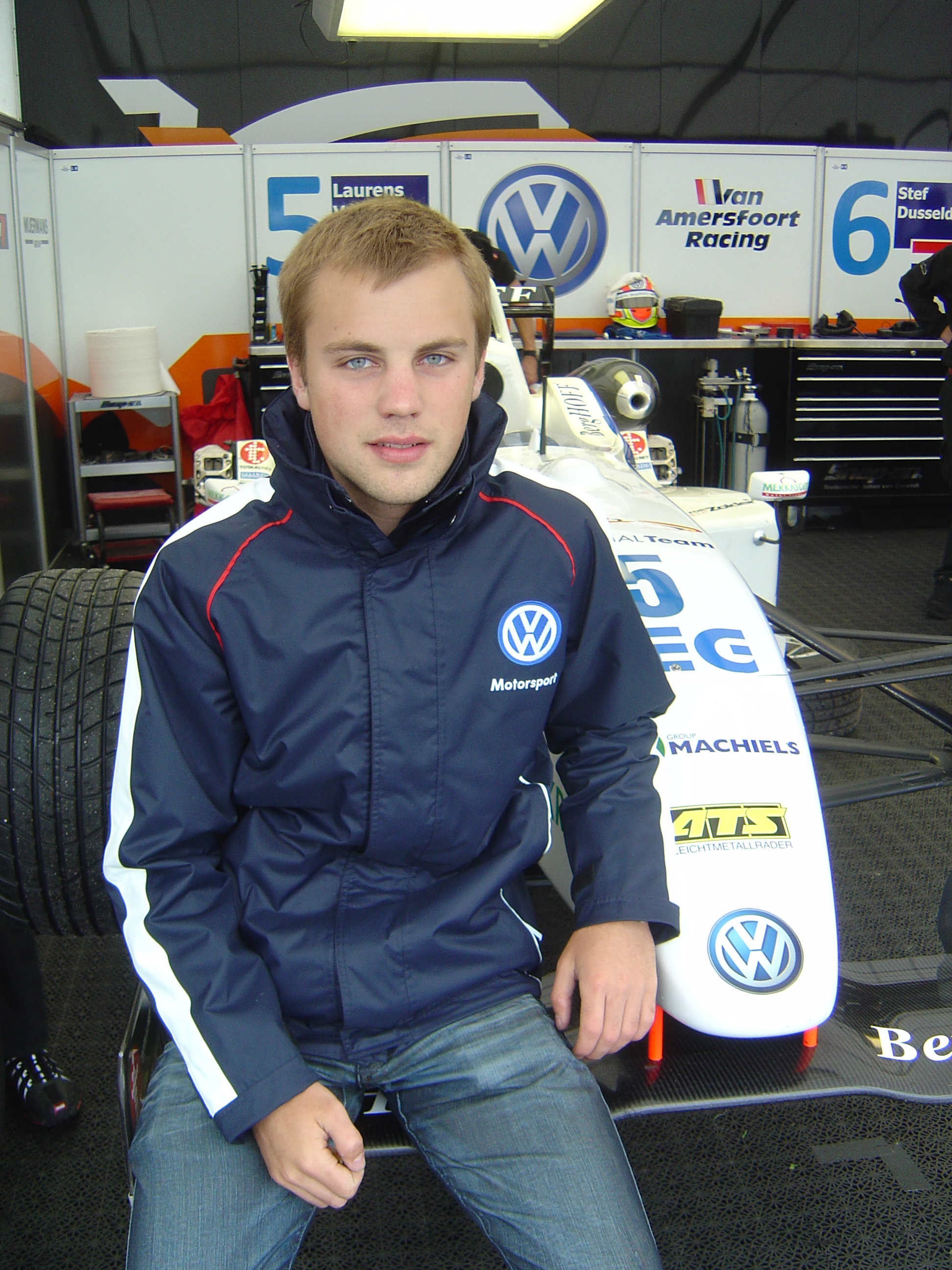
Laurens Vanthoor (pictured in 2009) helped take the No. 912 Porsche's second pole position of 2019.

Saturday's early afternoon qualifying session was divided into two groups that lasted 15 minutes each. Cars in GTD were sent out first and, after a ten-minute interval, GTLM vehicles drove onto the track. All cars were required to be driven by one participant and the starting order was determined by the competitor's fastest lap. IMSA then arranged the grid so that the GTLM field started in front of all GTD cars. The session took place on a damp track but dried out as it progressed.

The first was for cars in the GTD class. Zacharie Robichon in the No. 9 Porsche was fastest on the car's final lap timed lap with a time of 1 minute and 45.826 seconds to clinch his second pole position of the season. He was joined by Frankie Montecalvo's No. 12 Lexus on the grid's front row with his best lap being 0.324 seconds slower, and Richard Heistand drove the No. 14 AIM Vasser Sullivan Lexus to third place. Trent Hindman qualified the No. 86 Acura fourth, ahead of Alice Powell's fifth placed Acura.

The final session of qualifying was for cars in the GTLM class. Laurens Vanthoor in the No. 912 Porsche clinched his second pole position of the season. The No. 3 Corvette of Magnussen 0.078 seconds off the pace in second. The two Fords were third and fourth (the No. 67 car driven by Briscoe in front of the No. 66 vehicle of Hand). Oliver Gavin's No. 4 Corvette completed the top five category qualifiers. Tandy was sixth after spinning at turn twelve, and made contact with the barrier leaving damage on the left side. The two BMW Team RLL cars rounded out the GTLM field.

=== Qualifying results ===
Pole positions in each class are indicated in bold and by ‡.

| Pos. | Class | No. | Team | Driver | Time | Gap | Grid |
|---|---|---|---|---|---|---|---|
| 1 | **GTLM** | **912** | **(United States) Porsche GT Team** | **(Belgium) Laurens Vanthoor** | **1.40.630** | **_** | 1 ‡ |
| 2 | GTLM | 3 | (United States) Corvette Racing | (Denmark) Jan Magnussen | 1.40.708 | +0.078 | 2 |
| 3 | GTLM | 67 | (United States) Ford Chip Ganassi Racing | (Australia) Ryan Briscoe | 1.40.786 | +0.156 | 3 |
| 4 | GTLM | 66 | (United States) Ford Chip Ganassi Racing | (United States) Joey Hand | 1.40.956 | +0.326 | 4 |
| 5 | GTLM | 4 | (United States) Corvette Racing | (United Kingdom) Oliver Gavin | 1.41.578 | +0.948 | 5 |
| 6 | GTLM | 911 | (United States) Porsche GT Team | (United Kingdom) Nick Tandy | 1.41.615 | +0.985 | 6 |
| 7 | GTLM | 24 | (United States) BMW Team RLL | (United States) John Edwards | 1.41.703 | +1.073 | 7 |
| 8 | GTLM | 25 | (United States) BMW Team RLL | (United States) Connor De Phillippi | 1.41.772 | +1.772 | 8 |
| 9 | **GTD** | **9** | **(Canada) Pfaff Motorsports** | **(Canada) Zacharie Robichon** | **1.45.826** | **+5.196** | 9‡ |
| 10 | GTD | 12 | (Canada) AIM Vasser Sullivan | (United States) Frankie Montecalvo | 1.46.150 | +5.520 | 10 |
| 11 | GTD | 14 | (Canada) AIM Vasser Sullivan | (United States) Richard Heistand | 1.46.524 | +5.894 | 11 |
| 12 | GTD | 86 | (United States) Meyer Shank Racing with Curb-Agajanian | (United States) Trent Hindman | 1.46.697 | +6.067 | 12 |
| 13 | GTD | 57 | (United States) Heinricher Racing w/Meyer Shank Racing | (United Kingdom) Alice Powell | 1.48.159 | +7.529 | 13 |
| 14 | GTD | 96 | (United States) Turner Motorsport | (United States) Robby Foley | 1.48.398 | +7.768 | 14 |
| 15 | GTD | 33 | (United States) Mercedes-AMG Team Riley Motorsports | (United States) Ben Keating | 1.48.476 | +7.846 | 15 |
| 16 | GTD | 44 | (United States) Magnus Racing | (United States) John Potter | 1.48.567 | +7.937 | 16 |
| 17 | GTD | 48 | (United States) Paul Miller Racing | (United States) Corey Lewis | 1.51.132 | +10.502 | 17^{1} |
| 18 | GTD | 63 | (United States) Scuderia Corsa | (United States) Cooper MacNeil | 1.53.823 | +13.193 | 18^{2} |
| 19 | GTD | 76 | (Canada) Compass Racing | (United States) Matt Plumb | 1.54.213 | +13.583 | 19^{3} |
| 20 | GTD | 74 | (United States) Lone Star Racing | (United States) Gar Robinson | 1.56.054 | +15.424 | 20^{4} |
| 21 | GTD | 73 | (United States) Park Place Motorsports | (United States) Patrick Lindsey | 1.56.158 | +15.528 | 21^{5} |
Sources:

- ^{1} The No. 48 Paul Miller Racing entry was moved to the back of the GTD field for change tires during qualifying.
- ^{2} The No. 63 Scuderia Corsa entry was moved to the back of the GTD field for change tires during qualifying.
- ^{3} The No. 76 Compass Racing entry was moved to the back of the GTD field for change tires during qualifying.
- ^{4} The No. 74 Lone Star Racing entry was moved to the back of the GTD field for change tires during qualifying.
- ^{5} The No. 73 Park Place Motorsports entry was moved to the back of the GTD field for change tires during qualifying.

== Race ==
=== Post-race ===
The final results of GTLM kept Bamber and Vanthoor atop the Drivers' Championship with 280 points, but their advantage had been reduced by three as the victory of Pilet and Tandy meant the two drivers were eleven points behind. García and Magnussen's strong result allowed the duo to move into third while Briscoe and Westbrook fell to fourth as a result of finishing in fifth place. The final results of GTD meant Farnbacher and Hindman extended their advantage to 37 points as Robichon took over second position. Montecalvo and Bell advanced from fifth to fourth while Auberlen and Foley dropped from second to third. Porsche and Acura continued to top their respective Manufacturers' Championships, while Porsche GT Team and Meyer Shank Racing kept their respective advantages in their Teams' Championships with two rounds left in the season.

=== Race results ===
Class winners are denoted in bold and ‡.

| Pos | Class | No. | Team | Drivers | Chassis | Laps | Time/Retired |
| Pos | Class | No. | Team | Drivers | Engine | Laps | Time/Retired |
|---|---|---|---|---|---|---|---|
| 1 | **GTLM** | **911** | **(United States) Porsche GT Team** | **(France) Patrick Pilet (United Kingdom) Nick Tandy** | **Porsche 911 RSR** | **88** | **2:41:28.773 ‡** |
| 1 | **GTLM** | **911** | **(United States) Porsche GT Team** | **(France) Patrick Pilet (United Kingdom) Nick Tandy** | **Porsche 4.0 L Flat-6** | **88** | **2:41:28.773 ‡** |
| 2 | GTLM | 912 | (United States) Porsche GT Team | (New Zealand) Earl Bamber (Belgium) Laurens Vanthoor | Porsche 911 RSR | 88 | +0.737s |
| 2 | GTLM | 912 | (United States) Porsche GT Team | (New Zealand) Earl Bamber (Belgium) Laurens Vanthoor | Porsche 4.0 L Flat-6 | 88 | +0.737s |
| 3 | GTLM | 3 | (United States) Corvette Racing | (Spain) Antonio García (Denmark) Jan Magnussen | Chevrolet Corvette C7.R | 88 | +3.275s |
| 3 | GTLM | 3 | (United States) Corvette Racing | (Spain) Antonio García (Denmark) Jan Magnussen | Chevrolet LT5.5 5.5 L V8 | 88 | +3.275s |
| 4 | GTLM | 4 | (United States) Corvette Racing | (United Kingdom) Oliver Gavin (United States) Tommy Milner | Chevrolet Corvette C7.R | 88 | +3.972s |
| 4 | GTLM | 4 | (United States) Corvette Racing | (United Kingdom) Oliver Gavin (United States) Tommy Milner | Chevrolet LT5.5 5.5 L V8 | 88 | +3.972s |
| 5 | GTLM | 67 | (United States) Ford Chip Ganassi Racing | (Australia) Ryan Briscoe (United Kingdom) Richard Westbrook | Ford GT | 88 | +4.396s |
| 5 | GTLM | 67 | (United States) Ford Chip Ganassi Racing | (Australia) Ryan Briscoe (United Kingdom) Richard Westbrook | Ford EcoBoost 3.5 L Turbo V6 | 88 | +4.396s |
| 6 | GTLM | 66 | (United States) Ford Chip Ganassi Racing | (United States) Joey Hand (Germany) Dirk Müller | Ford GT | 88 | +9.556s |
| 6 | GTLM | 66 | (United States) Ford Chip Ganassi Racing | (United States) Joey Hand (Germany) Dirk Müller | Ford EcoBoost 3.5 L Turbo V6 | 88 | +9.556s |
| 7 | GTLM | 25 | (United States) BMW Team RLL | (United Kingdom) Tom Blomqvist (United States) Connor De Phillippi | BMW M8 GTE | 88 | +12.560s |
| 7 | GTLM | 25 | (United States) BMW Team RLL | (United Kingdom) Tom Blomqvist (United States) Connor De Phillippi | BMW S63 4.0 L Twin-turbo V8 | 88 | +12.560s |
| 8 | GTLM | 24 | (United States) BMW Team RLL | (United States) John Edwards (Finland) Jesse Krohn | BMW M8 GTE | 87 | +1 laps |
| 8 | GTLM | 24 | (United States) BMW Team RLL | (United States) John Edwards (Finland) Jesse Krohn | BMW S63 4.0 L Twin-turbo V8 | 87 | +1 laps |
| 9 | **GTD** | **33** | **(United States) Mercedes-AMG Team Riley Motorsports** | **(Netherlands) Jeroen Bleekemolen (United States) Ben Keating** | **Mercedes-AMG GT3** | **86** | **+2 laps** |
| 9 | **GTD** | **33** | **(United States) Mercedes-AMG Team Riley Motorsports** | **(Netherlands) Jeroen Bleekemolen (United States) Ben Keating** | **Mercedes-AMG M159 6.2 L V8** | **86** | **+2 laps** |
| 10 | GTD | 86 | (United States) Meyer Shank Racing with Curb-Agajanian | (Germany) Mario Farnbacher (United States) Trent Hindman | Acura NSX GT3 Evo | 86 | +2 laps |
| 10 | GTD | 86 | (United States) Meyer Shank Racing with Curb-Agajanian | (Germany) Mario Farnbacher (United States) Trent Hindman | Acura 3.5 L Turbo V6 | 86 | +2 laps |
| 11 | GTD | 63 | (United States) Scuderia Corsa | (United States) Cooper MacNeil (Finland) Toni Vilander | Ferrari 488 GT3 | 86 | +2 laps |
| 11 | GTD | 63 | (United States) Scuderia Corsa | (United States) Cooper MacNeil (Finland) Toni Vilander | Ferrari F154 3.9 L Turbo V8 | 86 | +2 laps |
| 12 | GTD | 9 | (Canada) Pfaff Motorsports | (Canada) Scott Hargrove (Canada) Zacharie Robichon | Porsche 911 GT3 R | 86 | +2 laps |
| 12 | GTD | 9 | (Canada) Pfaff Motorsports | (Canada) Scott Hargrove (Canada) Zacharie Robichon | Porsche 4.0 L Flat-6 | 86 | +2 laps |
| 13 | GTD | 73 | (United States) Park Place Motors | (United States) Patrick Long (United States) Patrick Lindsey | Porsche 911 GT3 R | 86 | +2 laps |
| 13 | GTD | 73 | (United States) Park Place Motors | (United States) Patrick Long (United States) Patrick Lindsey | Porsche 4.0 L Flat-6 | 86 | +2 laps |
| 14 | GTD | 44 | (United States) Magnus Racing | (United States) Andy Lally (United States) John Potter | Lamborghini Huracán GT3 Evo | 86 | +2 laps |
| 14 | GTD | 44 | (United States) Magnus Racing | (United States) Andy Lally (United States) John Potter | Lamborghini 5.2 L V10 | 86 | +2 laps |
| 15 | GTD | 12 | (Canada) AIM Vasser Sullivan | (United States) Townsend Bell (United States) Frankie Montecalvo | Lexus RC F GT3 | 86 | +2 laps |
| 15 | GTD | 12 | (Canada) AIM Vasser Sullivan | (United States) Townsend Bell (United States) Frankie Montecalvo | Lexus 5.0 L V8 | 86 | +2 laps |
| 16 | GTD | 74 | (United States) Lone Star Racing | (United States) Lawson Aschenbach (United States) Gar Robinson | Mercedes-AMG GT3 | 86 | +2 laps |
| 16 | GTD | 74 | (United States) Lone Star Racing | (United States) Lawson Aschenbach (United States) Gar Robinson | Mercedes-AMG M159 6.2 L V8 | 86 | +2 laps |
| 17 | GTD | 76 | (Canada) Compass Racing | (United States) Paul Holton (United States) Matt Plumb | McLaren 720S GT3 | 86 | +2 laps |
| 17 | GTD | 76 | (Canada) Compass Racing | (United States) Paul Holton (United States) Matt Plumb | McLaren M480T 4.0 L Twin-turbo V8 | 86 | +2 laps |
| 18 | GTD | 48 | (United States) Paul Miller Racing | (United States) Corey Lewis (United States) Bryan Sellers | Lamborghini Huracán GT3 Evo | 84 | +4 laps |
| 18 | GTD | 48 | (United States) Paul Miller Racing | (United States) Corey Lewis (United States) Bryan Sellers | Lamborghini 5.2 L V10 | 84 | +4 laps |
| 19 | GTD | 96 | (United States) Turner Motorsport | (United States) Bill Auberlen (United States) Robby Foley | BMW M6 GT3 | 83 | +5 laps |
| 19 | GTD | 96 | (United States) Turner Motorsport | (United States) Bill Auberlen (United States) Robby Foley | BMW 4.4 L Turbo V8 | 83 | +5 laps |
| 20 DNF | GTD | 57 | (United States) Heinricher Racing w/Meyer Shank Racing | (United Kingdom) Katherine Legge (United Kingdom) Alice Powell | Acura NSX GT3 Evo | 74 | Crash |
| 20 DNF | GTD | 57 | (United States) Heinricher Racing w/Meyer Shank Racing | (United Kingdom) Katherine Legge (United Kingdom) Alice Powell | Acura 3.5 L Turbo V6 | 74 | Crash |
| 21 DNF | GTD | 14 | (Canada) AIM Vasser Sullivan | (United Kingdom) Jack Hawksworth (United States) Richard Heistand | Lexus RC F GT3 | 63 | Electrical |
| 21 DNF | GTD | 14 | (Canada) AIM Vasser Sullivan | (United Kingdom) Jack Hawksworth (United States) Richard Heistand | Lexus 5.0 L V8 | 63 | Electrical |

== Standings after the race ==
DPi Drivers' Championship standings
| Pos. | +/– | Driver | Points |
|---|---|---|---|
| 1 | | (United States) Dane Cameron (Colombia) Juan Pablo Montoya | 239 |
| 2 | | (Brazil) Pipo Derani (Brazil) Felipe Nasr | 232 |
| 3 | | (United States) Jonathan Bomarito | 222 |
| 4 | | (Brazil) Hélio Castroneves (United States) Ricky Taylor | 222 |
| 5 | | (United Kingdom) Oliver Jarvis (United States) Tristan Nunez | 218 |

LMP2 Drivers' Championship standings
| Pos. | +/– | Driver | Points |
|---|---|---|---|
| 1 | | (United States) Matt McMurry | 200 |
| 2 | | (Canada) Cameron Cassels | 195 |
| 3 | 1 | (United States) Kyle Masson | 163 |
| 4 | | (France) Gabriel Aubry | 95 |
| 5 | | (United States) Eric Lux | 70 |

GTLM Drivers' Championship standings
| Pos. | +/– | Driver | Points |
|---|---|---|---|
| 1 | | (New Zealand) Earl Bamber (Belgium) Laurens Vanthoor | 280 |
| 2 | | (France) Patrick Pilet (United Kingdom) Nick Tandy | 269 |
| 3 | 1 | (Spain) Antonio García (Denmark) Jan Magnussen | 259 |
| 4 | 1 | (Australia) Ryan Briscoe (United Kingdom) Richard Westbrook | 256 |
| 5 | | (Germany) Dirk Müller | 248 |

GTD Drivers' Championship standings
| Pos. | +/– | Driver | Points |
|---|---|---|---|
| 1 | | (Germany) Mario Farnbacher (United States) Trent Hindman | 241 |
| 2 | 1 | (Canada) Zacharie Robichon | 204 |
| 3 | 1 | (United States) Bill Auberlen (United States) Robby Foley | 203 |
| 4 | 1 | (United States) Frankie Montecalvo (United States) Townsend Bell | 196 |
| 5 | 1 | (United States) Andy Lally (United States) John Potter | 196 |

- Note: Only the top five positions are included for all sets of standings.

DPi Teams' Championship standings
| Pos. | +/– | Team | Points |
|---|---|---|---|
| 1 | | (United States) #6 Acura Team Penske | 239 |
| 2 | | (United States) #31 Whelen Engineering Racing | 232 |
| 3 | | (Germany) #55 Mazda Team Joest | 222 |
| 4 | | (United States) #7 Acura Team Penske | 222 |
| 5 | | (Germany) #77 Mazda Team Joest | 218 |

LMP2 Teams' Championship standings
| Pos. | +/– | Team | Points |
|---|---|---|---|
| 1 | | (United States) #52 PR1/Mathiasen Motorsports | 200 |
| 2 | | (United States) #38 Performance Tech Motorsports | 195 |
| 3 | | (United States) #18 DragonSpeed | 35 |
| 4 | | (United States) #81 DragonSpeed | 30 |

GTLM Teams' Championship standings
| Pos. | +/– | Team | Points |
|---|---|---|---|
| 1 | | (United States) #912 Porsche GT Team | 280 |
| 2 | | (United States) #911 Porsche GT Team | 269 |
| 3 | 1 | (United States) #3 Corvette Racing | 259 |
| 4 | 1 | (United States) #67 Ford Chip Ganassi Racing | 256 |
| 5 | | (United States) #66 Ford Chip Ganassi Racing | 248 |

GTD Teams' Championship standings
| Pos. | +/– | Team | Points |
|---|---|---|---|
| 1 | | (United States) #86 Meyer-Shank Racing with Curb Agajanian | 241 |
| 2 | 1 | (Canada) #9 Pfaff Motorsports | 204 |
| 3 | 1 | (United States) #96 Turner Motorsport | 203 |
| 4 | 1 | (Canada) #12 AIM Vasser Sullivan | 196 |
| 5 | 1 | (United States) #44 Magnus Racing | 196 |

- Note: Only the top five positions are included for all sets of standings.

DPi Manufacturers' Championship standings
| Pos. | +/– | Manufacturer | Points |
|---|---|---|---|
| 1 | | (Japan) Acura | 262 |
| 2 | | (United States) Cadillac | 257 |
| 3 | | (Japan) Mazda | 251 |
| 4 | | (Japan) Nissan | 230 |

GTLM Manufacturers' Championship standings
| Pos. | +/– | Manufacturer | Points |
|---|---|---|---|
| 1 | | (Germany) Porsche | 304 |
| 2 | | (United States) Ford | 278 |
| 3 | | (United States) Chevrolet | 272 |
| 4 | | (Germany) BMW | 265 |
| 5 | | (Italy) Ferrari | 32 |

GTD Manufacturers' Championship standings
| Pos. | +/– | Manufacturer | Points |
|---|---|---|---|
| 1 | | (Japan) Acura | 242 |
| 2 | | (Italy) Lamborghini | 234 |
| 3 | 1 | (Germany) Porsche | 231 |
| 4 | 1 | (Japan) Lexus | 230 |
| 5 | | (Germany) BMW | 218 |

- Note: Only the top five positions are included for all sets of standings.

IMSA SportsCar Championship
| Previous race: Road Race Showcase at Road America | 2019 season | Next race: Monterey Grand Prix |
