= 2019 IMSA SportsCar Championship =

49th season of the racing series organized by IMSA

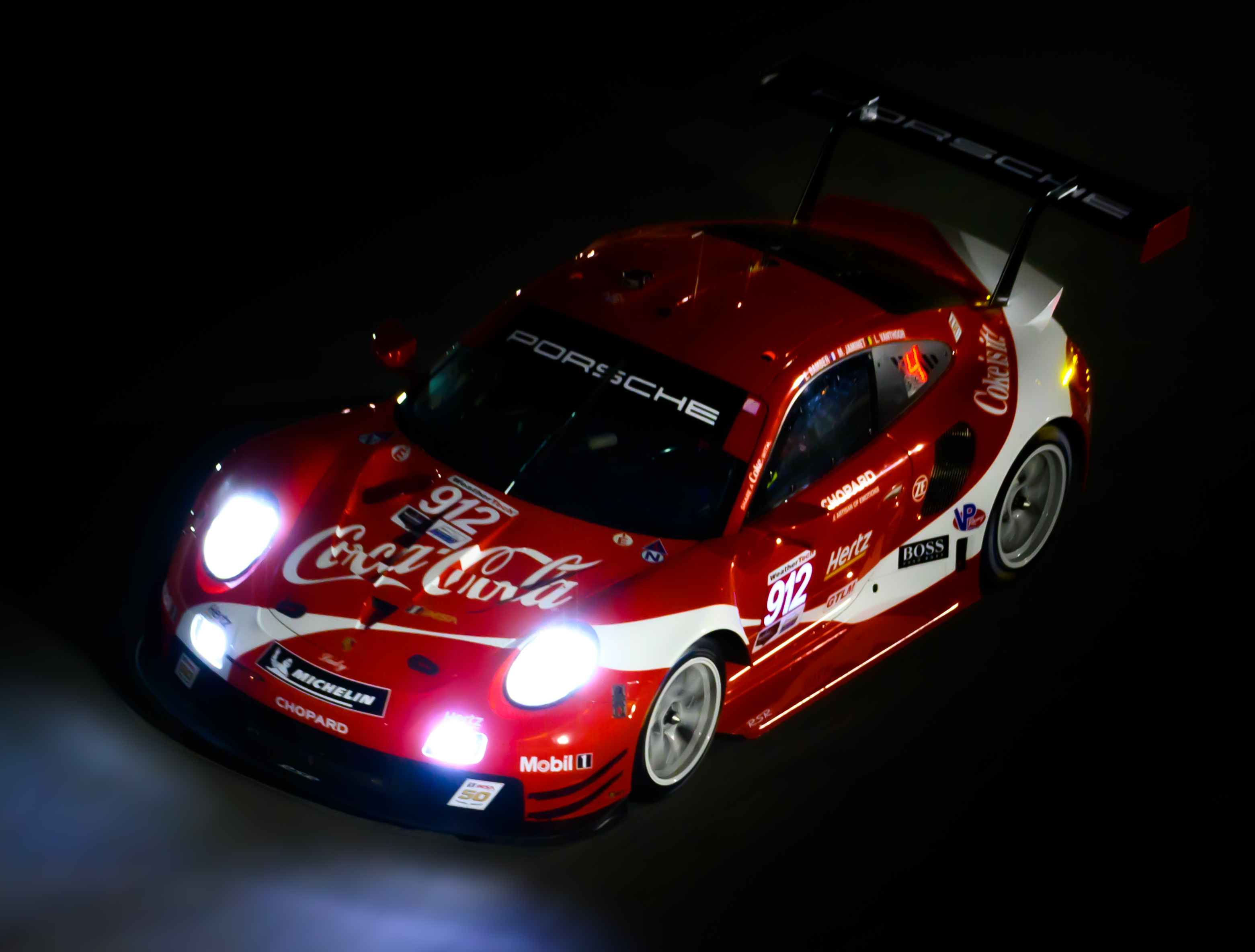
The No. 912 Porsche GT Team won the GT Le Mans championships.

The 2019 IMSA SportsCar Championship (known for sponsorship reasons as the 2019 IMSA WeatherTech SportsCar Championship) was the 49th motor racing championship sanctioned by the International Motor Sports Association (IMSA) (which traces its lineage back to the 1971 IMSA GT Championship). It was the sixth season of the United SportsCar Championship and fourth to be held under the name as the IMSA SportsCar Championship. It began on January 26 with the 24 Hours of Daytona, and ended on October 12 with the Petit Le Mans. The 2019 season marked the 50th anniversary since the founding of the International Motor Sports Association.

== Series news ==
- NBC Sports Group took over from Fox Sports as the series' official broadcaster. Coverage alternates between local NBC stations, NBC Sports Network, CNBC, and livestreams.
- Michelin increased its IMSA involvement by becoming the sole official tire supplier of the series, following the departure of Continental Tire at the end of 2018.
- As part of a plan to attempt to cut costs for the series' GT Daytona (GTD) class, the 2019 season featured a new support championship called the WeatherTech Sprint Cup. The championship was held for the GT Daytona class at the sprint events of the calendar.
- After an eleven-year partnership, Tequila Patrón ended their involvement with IMSA altogether at the end of the 2018 season. They also ended their sponsorship of the Extreme Speed Motorsports prototype team, who subsequently closed down operations. Michelin took Patrón's place as the sponsor of the endurance cup.
- As part of the celebration of the 50th anniversary of IMSA, multiple teams adopted racing liveries created in tribute to iconic teams throughout IMSA's history, such as Brumos Porsche, Electramotive Engineering, Roush Racing, and Comptech Acura.

== Classes ==
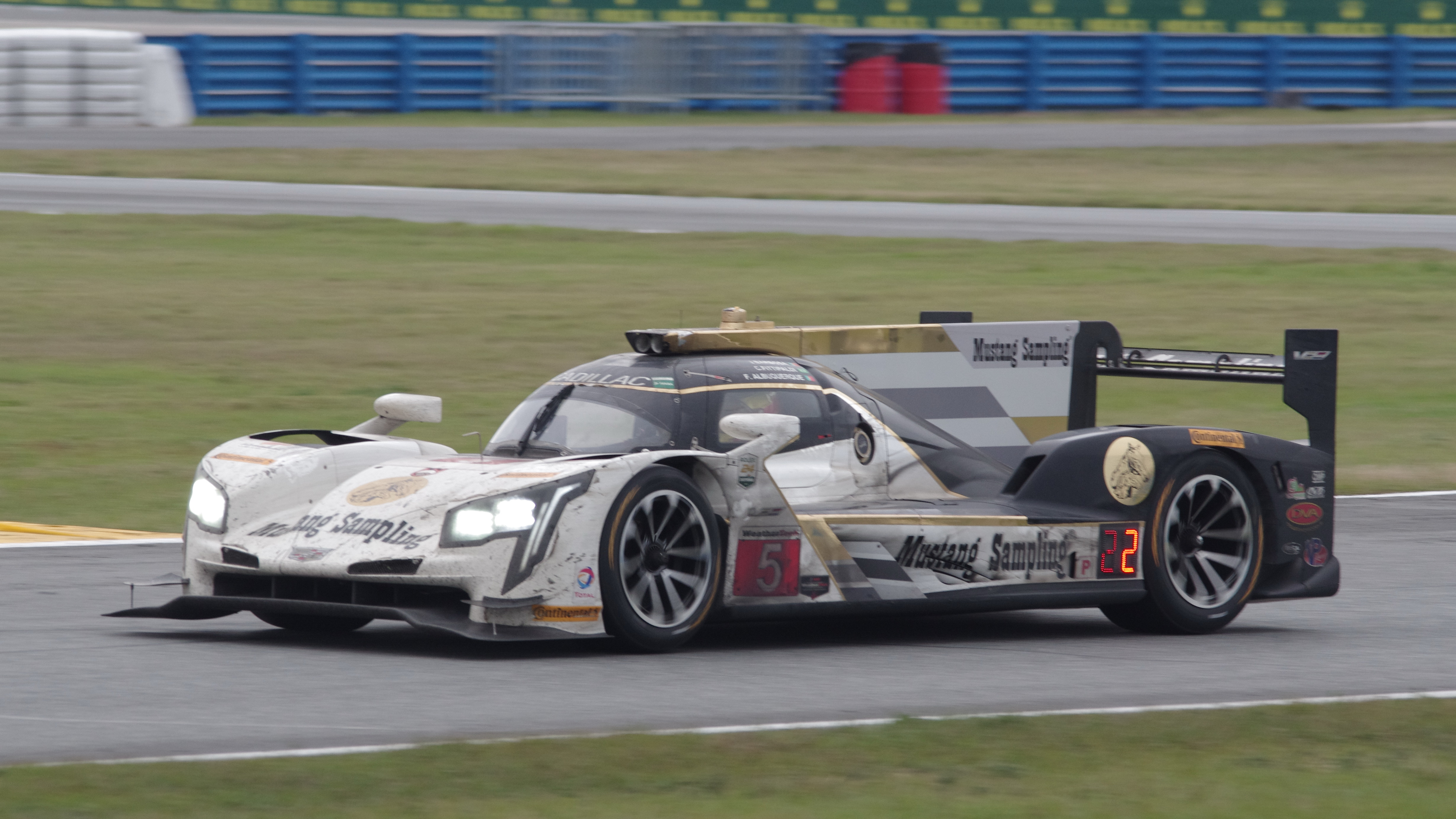
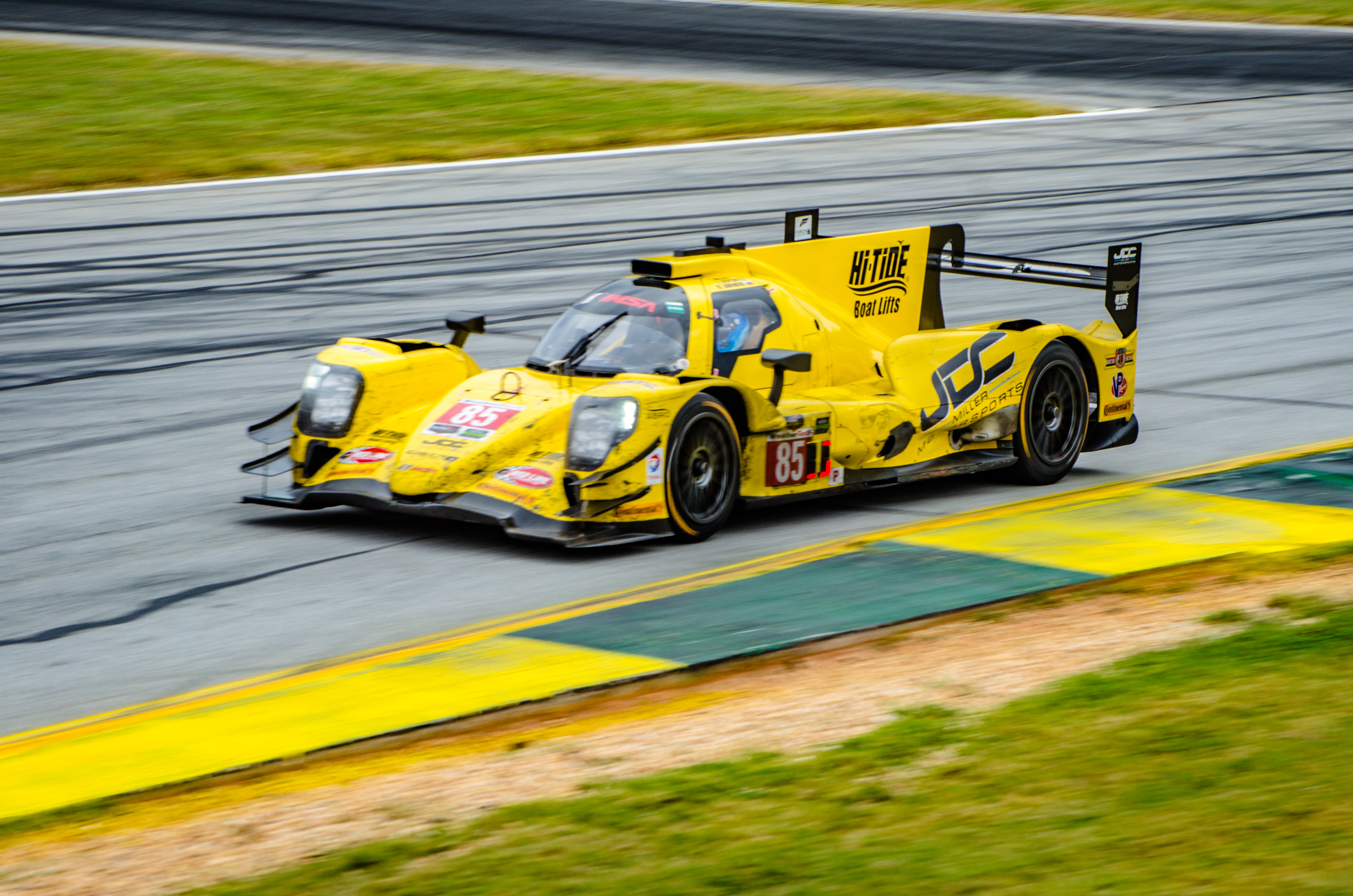
The DPi (pictured on the left) and LMP2 (right) categories were given their own distinct classes for the 2019 season.
- Daytona Prototype international (DPi)
- Le Mans Prototype 2 (LMP2)
- GT Le Mans (GTLM)
- GT Daytona (GTD)

The Prototype class, which previously combined Daytona Prototype international cars alongside Le Mans Prototype 2 cars, was now split into two separate classes.

=== Rule changes ===
- The DPi class is now the lead class of the championship, and features teams with full professional lineups running DPi cars. The class has its own Balance of Performance (BoP). The LMP2 class is the lower prototype class in the championship, featuring Global LMP2 cars with Pro-Am lineups. There is no BoP applied to the LMP2 class.
- Le Mans Prototype 2 (LMP2) and GT Daytona (GTD), the Pro-Am classes of the championship, must adhere to driver rating requirements. Each car is only allowed two Platinum-rated or Gold-rated drivers for the endurance events, alongside the requirement of at least one Bronze-rated or Silver-rated driver for all sprint races. In these classes, the Bronze or Silver-rated drivers are required to start the race.

== Schedule ==
The 2019 schedule was released on August 3, 2018, and featured twelve rounds.

Race is part of the Michelin Endurance Cup
Race is part of the WeatherTech Sprint Cup

Rnd.	Race	Length	Classes	Circuit	Location	Date
1	Rolex 24 at Daytona	24 hours	All	Daytona International Speedway	Daytona Beach, Florida	January 26–27
2	Mobil 1 Twelve Hours of Sebring	12 hours	All	Sebring International Raceway	Sebring, Florida	March 16
3	BUBBA Burger Sports Car Grand Prix at Long Beach	1 hour 40 minutes	DPi, GTLM	Long Beach Street Circuit	Long Beach, California	April 13
4	Acura Sports Car Challenge	2 hours 40 minutes	All	Mid-Ohio Sports Car Course	Lexington, Ohio	May 5
5	Chevrolet Sports Car Classic	1 hour 40 minutes	DPi, GTD (Note: The GTD class only scored points towards the WeatherTech Sprint Cup.)	The Raceway on Belle Isle	Detroit, Michigan	June 1
6	Sahlen's Six Hours of The Glen	6 hours	All	Watkins Glen International	Watkins Glen, New York	June 30
7	Mobil 1 SportsCar Grand Prix	2 hours 40 minutes	All	Canadian Tire Motorsport Park	Bowmanville, Ontario	July 7
8	Northeast Grand Prix	2 hours 40 minutes	GTLM, GTD	Lime Rock Park	Lakeville, Connecticut	July 20
9	IMSA Road Race Showcase	2 hours 40 minutes	All	Road America	Elkhart Lake, Wisconsin	August 4
10	Michelin GT Challenge at VIR	2 hours 40 minutes	GTLM, GTD	Virginia International Raceway	Alton, Virginia	August 25
11	IMSA Monterey Grand Prix	2 hours 40 minutes	All	WeatherTech Raceway Laguna Seca	Monterey, California	September 15
12	Motul Petit Le Mans	10 hours	All	Michelin Raceway Road Atlanta	Braselton, Georgia	October 12

== Entries ==
=== Daytona Prototype international (DPi) ===
Team	Chassis	Engine	No.	Drivers	Rounds
(United States) / Mustang Sampling Racing (Note: Car No. 5 entered as Mustang Sampling Racing and car No. 31 entered as Whelen Engineering Racing.); (United States) / Whelen Engineering Racing	Cadillac DPi-V.R	Cadillac LT4 5.5 L V8	5	(Portugal) Filipe Albuquerque	All
(United States) / Mustang Sampling Racing; (United States) / Whelen Engineering Racing	Cadillac DPi-V.R	Cadillac LT4 5.5 L V8	5	(Portugal) João Barbosa	All
(United States) / Mustang Sampling Racing; (United States) / Whelen Engineering Racing	Cadillac DPi-V.R	Cadillac LT4 5.5 L V8	5	(Brazil) Christian Fittipaldi	1
(United States) / Mustang Sampling Racing; (United States) / Whelen Engineering Racing	Cadillac DPi-V.R	Cadillac LT4 5.5 L V8	5	(New Zealand) Brendon Hartley	2
(United States) / Mustang Sampling Racing; (United States) / Whelen Engineering Racing	Cadillac DPi-V.R	Cadillac LT4 5.5 L V8	5	(United Kingdom) Mike Conway	6, 12
(United States) / Mustang Sampling Racing; (United States) / Whelen Engineering Racing	Cadillac DPi-V.R	Cadillac LT4 5.5 L V8	31	(Brazil) Pipo Derani	All
(United States) / Mustang Sampling Racing; (United States) / Whelen Engineering Racing	Cadillac DPi-V.R	Cadillac LT4 5.5 L V8	31	(Brazil) Felipe Nasr	All
(United States) / Mustang Sampling Racing; (United States) / Whelen Engineering Racing	Cadillac DPi-V.R	Cadillac LT4 5.5 L V8	31	(United States) Eric Curran	1–2, 6, 12
(United States) Acura Team Penske	Acura ARX-05	Acura AR35TT 3.5 L Turbo V6	6	(United States) Dane Cameron	All
(United States) Acura Team Penske	Acura ARX-05	Acura AR35TT 3.5 L Turbo V6	6	(Colombia) Juan Pablo Montoya	All
(United States) Acura Team Penske	Acura ARX-05	Acura AR35TT 3.5 L Turbo V6	6	(France) Simon Pagenaud	1–2, 12
(United States) Acura Team Penske	Acura ARX-05	Acura AR35TT 3.5 L Turbo V6	7	(Brazil) Hélio Castroneves	All
(United States) Acura Team Penske	Acura ARX-05	Acura AR35TT 3.5 L Turbo V6	7	(United States) Ricky Taylor	All
(United States) Acura Team Penske	Acura ARX-05	Acura AR35TT 3.5 L Turbo V6	7	(United States) Alexander Rossi	1–2
(United States) Acura Team Penske	Acura ARX-05	Acura AR35TT 3.5 L Turbo V6	7	(United States) Graham Rahal	12
(United States) Konica Minolta Cadillac	Cadillac DPi-V.R	Cadillac LT4 5.5 L V8	10	(United States) Jordan Taylor	All
(United States) Konica Minolta Cadillac	Cadillac DPi-V.R	Cadillac LT4 5.5 L V8	10	(Netherlands) Renger van der Zande	All
(United States) Konica Minolta Cadillac	Cadillac DPi-V.R	Cadillac LT4 5.5 L V8	10	(Spain) Fernando Alonso	1
(United States) Konica Minolta Cadillac	Cadillac DPi-V.R	Cadillac LT4 5.5 L V8	10	(Japan) Kamui Kobayashi	1
(United States) Konica Minolta Cadillac	Cadillac DPi-V.R	Cadillac LT4 5.5 L V8	10	(France) Matthieu Vaxivière	2, 12
(Argentina) Juncos Racing	Cadillac DPi-V.R	Cadillac LT4 5.5 L V8	50	(United States) Will Owen	1–7, 12
(Argentina) Juncos Racing	Cadillac DPi-V.R	Cadillac LT4 5.5 L V8	50	(Austria) René Binder	1–2, 6, 12
(Argentina) Juncos Racing	Cadillac DPi-V.R	Cadillac LT4 5.5 L V8	50	(Argentina) Agustín Canapino	1–2
(Argentina) Juncos Racing	Cadillac DPi-V.R	Cadillac LT4 5.5 L V8	50	(United States) Kyle Kaiser	1, 3–4
(Argentina) Juncos Racing	Cadillac DPi-V.R	Cadillac LT4 5.5 L V8	50	(Brazil) Victor Franzoni	5, 7
(Argentina) Juncos Racing	Cadillac DPi-V.R	Cadillac LT4 5.5 L V8	50	(United States) Spencer Pigot	12
(United States) CORE Autosport	Nissan Onroak DPi	Nissan VR38DETT 3.8 L Turbo V6	54	(United States) Jon Bennett	All
(United States) CORE Autosport	Nissan Onroak DPi	Nissan VR38DETT 3.8 L Turbo V6	54	(United States) Colin Braun	All
(United States) CORE Autosport	Nissan Onroak DPi	Nissan VR38DETT 3.8 L Turbo V6	54	(France) Romain Dumas	1–2, 6, 12
(United States) CORE Autosport	Nissan Onroak DPi	Nissan VR38DETT 3.8 L Turbo V6	54	(France) Loïc Duval	1
(Germany) Mazda Team Joest	Mazda RT24-P	Mazda MZ-2.0T 2.0 L Turbo I4	55	(United States) Jonathan Bomarito	All
(Germany) Mazda Team Joest	Mazda RT24-P	Mazda MZ-2.0T 2.0 L Turbo I4	55	(United Kingdom) Harry Tincknell	1–3, 5–7, 9, 11–12
(Germany) Mazda Team Joest	Mazda RT24-P	Mazda MZ-2.0T 2.0 L Turbo I4	55	(France) Olivier Pla	1–2, 6, 12
(Germany) Mazda Team Joest	Mazda RT24-P	Mazda MZ-2.0T 2.0 L Turbo I4	55	(United States) Ryan Hunter-Reay	4
(Germany) Mazda Team Joest	Mazda RT24-P	Mazda MZ-2.0T 2.0 L Turbo I4	77	(United Kingdom) Oliver Jarvis	All
(Germany) Mazda Team Joest	Mazda RT24-P	Mazda MZ-2.0T 2.0 L Turbo I4	77	(United States) Tristan Nunez	All
(Germany) Mazda Team Joest	Mazda RT24-P	Mazda MZ-2.0T 2.0 L Turbo I4	77	(Germany) Timo Bernhard	1–2, 6, 12
(Germany) Mazda Team Joest	Mazda RT24-P	Mazda MZ-2.0T 2.0 L Turbo I4	77	(Germany) René Rast	1
(United States) JDC-Miller MotorSports	Cadillac DPi-V.R	Cadillac LT4 5.5 L V8	84	(South Africa) Stephen Simpson	All
(United States) JDC-Miller MotorSports	Cadillac DPi-V.R	Cadillac LT4 5.5 L V8	84	(Switzerland) Simon Trummer	All
(United States) JDC-Miller MotorSports	Cadillac DPi-V.R	Cadillac LT4 5.5 L V8	84	(United States) Chris Miller	1–2, 6, 12
(United States) JDC-Miller MotorSports	Cadillac DPi-V.R	Cadillac LT4 5.5 L V8	84	(Colombia) Juan Piedrahita	1
(United States) JDC-Miller MotorSports	Cadillac DPi-V.R	Cadillac LT4 5.5 L V8	85	(Canada) Mikhail Goikhberg	All
(United States) JDC-Miller MotorSports	Cadillac DPi-V.R	Cadillac LT4 5.5 L V8	85	(France) Tristan Vautier	All
(United States) JDC-Miller MotorSports	Cadillac DPi-V.R	Cadillac LT4 5.5 L V8	85	(Brazil) Rubens Barrichello	1
(United States) JDC-Miller MotorSports	Cadillac DPi-V.R	Cadillac LT4 5.5 L V8	85	(Canada) Devlin DeFrancesco	1
(United States) JDC-Miller MotorSports	Cadillac DPi-V.R	Cadillac LT4 5.5 L V8	85	(Colombia) Juan Piedrahita	2, 6, 12

=== Le Mans Prototype 2 (LMP2) ===
In accordance with the 2017 LMP2 regulations, all cars in the LMP2 class use the Gibson GK428 V8 engine.

Team	Car	No.	Drivers	Rounds
(United States) DragonSpeed	Oreca 07	18	(Republic of Ireland) Ryan Cullen	1
(United States) DragonSpeed	Oreca 07	18	(Mexico) Roberto González	1
(United States) DragonSpeed	Oreca 07	18	(Venezuela) Pastor Maldonado	1
(United States) DragonSpeed	Oreca 07	18	(Colombia) Sebastián Saavedra	1
(United States) DragonSpeed	Oreca 07	81	(United Kingdom) Ben Hanley	1
(United States) DragonSpeed	Oreca 07	81	(Sweden) Henrik Hedman	1
(United States) DragonSpeed	Oreca 07	81	(France) Nicolas Lapierre	1
(United States) DragonSpeed	Oreca 07	81	(Australia) James Allen	1
(United States) Performance Tech Motorsports	Oreca 07	38	(Canada) Cameron Cassels	All
(United States) Performance Tech Motorsports	Oreca 07	38	(United States) Kyle Masson	1–2, 4, 6–7, 11–12
(United States) Performance Tech Motorsports	Oreca 07	38	(United States) Robert Masson	1
(United States) Performance Tech Motorsports	Oreca 07	38	(United States) Kris Wright	1
(United States) Performance Tech Motorsports	Oreca 07	38	(United States) Andrew Evans	2, 6, 12
(United States) Performance Tech Motorsports	Oreca 07	38	(United States) James French	9
(United States) PR1/Mathiasen Motorsports	Oreca 07	52	(United States) Matt McMurry	All
(United States) PR1/Mathiasen Motorsports	Oreca 07	52	(France) Gabriel Aubry	1–2, 6, 12
(United States) PR1/Mathiasen Motorsports	Oreca 07	52	(France) Enzo Guibbert	1
(United States) PR1/Mathiasen Motorsports	Oreca 07	52	(United States) Mark Kvamme	1
(United States) PR1/Mathiasen Motorsports	Oreca 07	52	(Denmark) Anders Fjordbach	2
(United States) PR1/Mathiasen Motorsports	Oreca 07	52	(United States) Eric Lux	4, 6
(United States) PR1/Mathiasen Motorsports	Oreca 07	52	(Canada) Dalton Kellett	7, 11–12
(United States) PR1/Mathiasen Motorsports	Oreca 07	52	(United States) Patrick Kelly	9

=== GT Le Mans (GTLM) ===
Team	Chassis	Engine	No.	Drivers	Rounds
(United States) Corvette Racing	Chevrolet Corvette C7.R	Chevrolet LT5.5R 5.5 L V8	3	(Spain) Antonio García	All
(United States) Corvette Racing	Chevrolet Corvette C7.R	Chevrolet LT5.5R 5.5 L V8	3	(Denmark) Jan Magnussen	All
(United States) Corvette Racing	Chevrolet Corvette C7.R	Chevrolet LT5.5R 5.5 L V8	3	(Germany) Mike Rockenfeller	1–2, 12
(United States) Corvette Racing	Chevrolet Corvette C7.R	Chevrolet LT5.5R 5.5 L V8	4	(United Kingdom) Oliver Gavin	All
(United States) Corvette Racing	Chevrolet Corvette C7.R	Chevrolet LT5.5R 5.5 L V8	4	(United States) Tommy Milner	1–4, 6, 9–12
(United States) Corvette Racing	Chevrolet Corvette C7.R	Chevrolet LT5.5R 5.5 L V8	4	(Switzerland) Marcel Fässler	1–2, 7–8, 12
(United States) BMW Team RLL	BMW M8 GTE	BMW S63 4.0 L Turbo V8	24	(United States) John Edwards	All
(United States) BMW Team RLL	BMW M8 GTE	BMW S63 4.0 L Turbo V8	24	(Finland) Jesse Krohn	All
(United States) BMW Team RLL	BMW M8 GTE	BMW S63 4.0 L Turbo V8	24	(Australia) Chaz Mostert	1
(United States) BMW Team RLL	BMW M8 GTE	BMW S63 4.0 L Turbo V8	24	(Italy) Alex Zanardi	1
(United States) BMW Team RLL	BMW M8 GTE	BMW S63 4.0 L Turbo V8	24	(Austria) Philipp Eng	2, 12
(United States) BMW Team RLL	BMW M8 GTE	BMW S63 4.0 L Turbo V8	25	(United States) Connor De Phillippi	All
(United States) BMW Team RLL	BMW M8 GTE	BMW S63 4.0 L Turbo V8	25	(United States) Colton Herta	1–2, 12
(United States) BMW Team RLL	BMW M8 GTE	BMW S63 4.0 L Turbo V8	25	(Austria) Philipp Eng	1
(United States) BMW Team RLL	BMW M8 GTE	BMW S63 4.0 L Turbo V8	25	(Brazil) Augusto Farfus	1
(United States) BMW Team RLL	BMW M8 GTE	BMW S63 4.0 L Turbo V8	25	(United Kingdom) Tom Blomqvist	2–4, 6–12
(United States) Risi Competizione	Ferrari 488 GTE Evo	Ferrari F154CB 4.0 L Turbo V8	62	(United Kingdom) James Calado	1, 12
(United States) Risi Competizione	Ferrari 488 GTE Evo	Ferrari F154CB 4.0 L Turbo V8	62	(Italy) Alessandro Pier Guidi	1, 12
(United States) Risi Competizione	Ferrari 488 GTE Evo	Ferrari F154CB 4.0 L Turbo V8	62	(Spain) Miguel Molina	1
(United States) Risi Competizione	Ferrari 488 GTE Evo	Ferrari F154CB 4.0 L Turbo V8	62	(Italy) Davide Rigon	1
(United States) Risi Competizione	Ferrari 488 GTE Evo	Ferrari F154CB 4.0 L Turbo V8	62	(Brazil) Daniel Serra	12
(United States) Ford Chip Ganassi Racing	Ford GT	Ford EcoBoost D35 3.5 L Turbo V6	66	(Germany) Dirk Müller	All
(United States) Ford Chip Ganassi Racing	Ford GT	Ford EcoBoost D35 3.5 L Turbo V6	66	(France) Sébastien Bourdais	1–4, 12
(United States) Ford Chip Ganassi Racing	Ford GT	Ford EcoBoost D35 3.5 L Turbo V6	66	(United States) Joey Hand	1–2, 6–12
(United States) Ford Chip Ganassi Racing	Ford GT	Ford EcoBoost D35 3.5 L Turbo V6	67	(Australia) Ryan Briscoe	All
(United States) Ford Chip Ganassi Racing	Ford GT	Ford EcoBoost D35 3.5 L Turbo V6	67	(United Kingdom) Richard Westbrook	All
(United States) Ford Chip Ganassi Racing	Ford GT	Ford EcoBoost D35 3.5 L Turbo V6	67	(New Zealand) Scott Dixon	1–2, 12
(United States) Porsche GT Team	Porsche 911 RSR	Porsche M97/80 4.0 L Flat-6	911	(France) Patrick Pilet	All
(United States) Porsche GT Team	Porsche 911 RSR	Porsche M97/80 4.0 L Flat-6	911	(United Kingdom) Nick Tandy	All
(United States) Porsche GT Team	Porsche 911 RSR	Porsche M97/80 4.0 L Flat-6	911	(France) Frédéric Makowiecki	1–2, 12
(United States) Porsche GT Team	Porsche 911 RSR	Porsche M97/80 4.0 L Flat-6	912	(New Zealand) Earl Bamber	All
(United States) Porsche GT Team	Porsche 911 RSR	Porsche M97/80 4.0 L Flat-6	912	(Belgium) Laurens Vanthoor	All
(United States) Porsche GT Team	Porsche 911 RSR	Porsche M97/80 4.0 L Flat-6	912	(France) Mathieu Jaminet	1–2, 12

=== GT Daytona (GTD) ===
Team	Chassis	Engine	No.	Drivers	Rounds
(United States) Starworks Motorsport	Audi R8 LMS Evo	Audi DAR 5.2 L V10	8	(United States) Parker Chase	1–2, 4–6, 9
(United States) Starworks Motorsport	Audi R8 LMS Evo	Audi DAR 5.2 L V10	8	(United Kingdom) Ryan Dalziel	1–2, 4–6, 9
(United States) Starworks Motorsport	Audi R8 LMS Evo	Audi DAR 5.2 L V10	8	(Argentina) Ezequiel Pérez Companc	1–2
(United States) Starworks Motorsport	Audi R8 LMS Evo	Audi DAR 5.2 L V10	8	(Germany) Christopher Haase	1
(United States) Starworks Motorsport	Audi R8 LMS Evo	Audi DAR 5.2 L V10	8	(United States) Mike Skeen	6
(Canada) Pfaff Motorsports	Porsche 911 GT3 R	Porsche 4.0 L Flat-6	9	(Canada) Scott Hargrove	1–2, 4, 6–7, 10–12
(Canada) Pfaff Motorsports	Porsche 911 GT3 R	Porsche 4.0 L Flat-6	9	(Canada) Zacharie Robichon	1–2, 4, 6–12
(Canada) Pfaff Motorsports	Porsche 911 GT3 R	Porsche 4.0 L Flat-6	9	(Germany) Lars Kern	1–2, 6, 12
(Canada) Pfaff Motorsports	Porsche 911 GT3 R	Porsche 4.0 L Flat-6	9	(Norway) Dennis Olsen	1, 8
(Canada) Pfaff Motorsports	Porsche 911 GT3 R	Porsche 4.0 L Flat-6	9	(Australia) Matt Campbell	9
(Austria) GRT Grasser Racing Team	Lamborghini Huracán GT3 Evo	Lamborghini DGF 5.2 L V10	11	(Italy) Mirko Bortolotti	1–2
(Austria) GRT Grasser Racing Team	Lamborghini Huracán GT3 Evo	Lamborghini DGF 5.2 L V10	11	(Netherlands) Rik Breukers	1–2
(Austria) GRT Grasser Racing Team	Lamborghini Huracán GT3 Evo	Lamborghini DGF 5.2 L V10	11	(Switzerland) Rolf Ineichen	1–2
(Austria) GRT Grasser Racing Team	Lamborghini Huracán GT3 Evo	Lamborghini DGF 5.2 L V10	11	(Germany) Christian Engelhart	1
(United States) Magnus Racing	Lamborghini Huracán GT3 Evo	Lamborghini DGF 5.2 L V10	11	(United States) Andy Lally	8
(United States) Magnus Racing	Lamborghini Huracán GT3 Evo	Lamborghini DGF 5.2 L V10	11	(United States) John Potter	8
(United States) Magnus Racing	Lamborghini Huracán GT3 Evo	Lamborghini DGF 5.2 L V10	44	(United States) Andy Lally	1–2, 4–7, 9–12
(United States) Magnus Racing	Lamborghini Huracán GT3 Evo	Lamborghini DGF 5.2 L V10	44	(United States) John Potter	1–2, 4–7, 9–12
(United States) Magnus Racing	Lamborghini Huracán GT3 Evo	Lamborghini DGF 5.2 L V10	44	(United States) Spencer Pumpelly	1–2, 6, 12
(United States) Magnus Racing	Lamborghini Huracán GT3 Evo	Lamborghini DGF 5.2 L V10	44	(Italy) Marco Mapelli	1
(Canada) AIM Vasser Sullivan	Lexus RC F GT3	Toyota 2UR-GSE 5.4 L V8	12	(United States) Townsend Bell	All
(Canada) AIM Vasser Sullivan	Lexus RC F GT3	Toyota 2UR-GSE 5.4 L V8	12	(United States) Frankie Montecalvo	All
(Canada) AIM Vasser Sullivan	Lexus RC F GT3	Toyota 2UR-GSE 5.4 L V8	12	(United States) Aaron Telitz	1–2, 6, 12
(Canada) AIM Vasser Sullivan	Lexus RC F GT3	Toyota 2UR-GSE 5.4 L V8	12	(United States) Jeff Segal	1
(Canada) AIM Vasser Sullivan	Lexus RC F GT3	Toyota 2UR-GSE 5.4 L V8	14	(United Kingdom) Jack Hawksworth	All
(Canada) AIM Vasser Sullivan	Lexus RC F GT3	Toyota 2UR-GSE 5.4 L V8	14	(United States) Richard Heistand	All
(Canada) AIM Vasser Sullivan	Lexus RC F GT3	Toyota 2UR-GSE 5.4 L V8	14	(New Zealand) Nick Cassidy	1
(Canada) AIM Vasser Sullivan	Lexus RC F GT3	Toyota 2UR-GSE 5.4 L V8	14	(United States) Austin Cindric	1
(Canada) AIM Vasser Sullivan	Lexus RC F GT3	Toyota 2UR-GSE 5.4 L V8	14	(Switzerland) Philipp Frommenwiler	2, 6
(Canada) AIM Vasser Sullivan	Lexus RC F GT3	Toyota 2UR-GSE 5.4 L V8	14	(United States) Parker Chase	12
(Brazil) Via Italia Racing	Ferrari 488 GT3	Ferrari F154CB 3.9 L Turbo V8	13	(Italy) Andrea Bertolini	1
(Brazil) Via Italia Racing	Ferrari 488 GT3	Ferrari F154CB 3.9 L Turbo V8	13	(Brazil) Victor Franzoni	1
(Brazil) Via Italia Racing	Ferrari 488 GT3	Ferrari F154CB 3.9 L Turbo V8	13	(Brazil) Marcos Gomes	1
(Brazil) Via Italia Racing	Ferrari 488 GT3	Ferrari F154CB 3.9 L Turbo V8	13	(Brazil) Chico Longo	1
(United States) Moorespeed	Audi R8 LMS Evo	Audi DAR 5.2 L V10	19	(United States) Will Hardeman	1–2, 4, 6
(United States) Moorespeed	Audi R8 LMS Evo	Audi DAR 5.2 L V10	19	(Spain) Alex Riberas	1–2, 4, 6
(United States) Moorespeed	Audi R8 LMS Evo	Audi DAR 5.2 L V10	19	(United States) Andrew Davis	1–2, 6
(United States) Moorespeed	Audi R8 LMS Evo	Audi DAR 5.2 L V10	19	(Germany) Markus Winkelhock	1
(Germany) Montaplast by Land-Motorsport	Audi R8 LMS Evo	Audi DAR 5.2 L V10	29	(Switzerland) Ricardo Feller	1–2, 6, 12
(Germany) Montaplast by Land-Motorsport	Audi R8 LMS Evo	Audi DAR 5.2 L V10	29	(Germany) Christopher Mies	1–2, 6, 12
(Germany) Montaplast by Land-Motorsport	Audi R8 LMS Evo	Audi DAR 5.2 L V10	29	(Canada) Daniel Morad	1–2, 6, 12
(Germany) Montaplast by Land-Motorsport	Audi R8 LMS Evo	Audi DAR 5.2 L V10	29	(Belgium) Dries Vanthoor	1
(United States) Mercedes-AMG Team Riley Motorsports	Mercedes-AMG GT3	Mercedes-AMG M159 6.2 L V8	33	(Netherlands) Jeroen Bleekemolen	1–2, 4, 6–12
(United States) Mercedes-AMG Team Riley Motorsports	Mercedes-AMG GT3	Mercedes-AMG M159 6.2 L V8	33	(United States) Ben Keating	1–2, 4, 6–12
(United States) Mercedes-AMG Team Riley Motorsports	Mercedes-AMG GT3	Mercedes-AMG M159 6.2 L V8	33	(Brazil) Felipe Fraga	1–2, 6, 12
(United States) Mercedes-AMG Team Riley Motorsports	Mercedes-AMG GT3	Mercedes-AMG M159 6.2 L V8	33	(Germany) Luca Stolz	1
(Italy) Ebimotors	Lamborghini Huracán GT3 Evo	Lamborghini DGF 5.2 L V10	46	(Italy) Giacomo Altoè	1
(Italy) Ebimotors	Lamborghini Huracán GT3 Evo	Lamborghini DGF 5.2 L V10	46	(Italy) Fabio Babini	1
(Italy) Ebimotors	Lamborghini Huracán GT3 Evo	Lamborghini DGF 5.2 L V10	46	(Italy) Emanuele Busnelli	1
(Italy) Ebimotors	Lamborghini Huracán GT3 Evo	Lamborghini DGF 5.2 L V10	46	(United Kingdom) Taylor Proto	1
(United States) Precision Performance Motorsports	Lamborghini Huracán GT3 Evo	Lamborghini DGF 5.2 L V10	47	(United States) Don Yount	1–2, 6, 12
(United States) Precision Performance Motorsports	Lamborghini Huracán GT3 Evo	Lamborghini DGF 5.2 L V10	47	(Sweden) Linus Lundqvist	1
(United States) Precision Performance Motorsports	Lamborghini Huracán GT3 Evo	Lamborghini DGF 5.2 L V10	47	(United States) Steve Dunn	1
(United States) Precision Performance Motorsports	Lamborghini Huracán GT3 Evo	Lamborghini DGF 5.2 L V10	47	(Serbia) Miloš Pavlović	1
(United States) Precision Performance Motorsports	Lamborghini Huracán GT3 Evo	Lamborghini DGF 5.2 L V10	47	(United States) Brandon Gdovic	2, 6, 12
(United States) Precision Performance Motorsports	Lamborghini Huracán GT3 Evo	Lamborghini DGF 5.2 L V10	47	(United States) Lawson Aschenbach	2
(United States) Precision Performance Motorsports	Lamborghini Huracán GT3 Evo	Lamborghini DGF 5.2 L V10	47	(Australia) Jake Eidson	6
(United States) Precision Performance Motorsports	Lamborghini Huracán GT3 Evo	Lamborghini DGF 5.2 L V10	47	(United States) Shinya Michimi	12
(United States) Paul Miller Racing	Lamborghini Huracán GT3 Evo	Lamborghini DGF 5.2 L V10	48	(United States) Bryan Sellers	All
(United States) Paul Miller Racing	Lamborghini Huracán GT3 Evo	Lamborghini DGF 5.2 L V10	48	(United States) Ryan Hardwick	1–2, 4–7
(United States) Paul Miller Racing	Lamborghini Huracán GT3 Evo	Lamborghini DGF 5.2 L V10	48	(United States) Corey Lewis	1–2, 6, 8–12
(United States) Paul Miller Racing	Lamborghini Huracán GT3 Evo	Lamborghini DGF 5.2 L V10	48	(Italy) Andrea Caldarelli	1
(United States) Paul Miller Racing	Lamborghini Huracán GT3 Evo	Lamborghini DGF 5.2 L V10	48	(Germany) Marco Seefried	12
(Switzerland) Spirit of Race	Ferrari 488 GT3	Ferrari F154CB 3.9 L Turbo V8	51	(Canada) Paul Dalla Lana	1
(Switzerland) Spirit of Race	Ferrari 488 GT3	Ferrari F154CB 3.9 L Turbo V8	51	(Portugal) Pedro Lamy	1
(Switzerland) Spirit of Race	Ferrari 488 GT3	Ferrari F154CB 3.9 L Turbo V8	51	(Austria) Mathias Lauda	1
(Switzerland) Spirit of Race	Ferrari 488 GT3	Ferrari F154CB 3.9 L Turbo V8	51	(Brazil) Daniel Serra	1
(United States) / Heinricher Racing with Meyer Shank Racing (Note: Car No. 57 entered as Heinricher Racing with Meyer Shank Racing and car No. 86 entered as Meyer Shank Racing with Curb-Agajanian.); (United States) / Meyer Shank Racing with Curb-Agajanian	Acura NSX GT3 Evo	Acura JNC1 3.5 L Turbo V6	57	(United Kingdom) Katherine Legge	All
(United States) / Heinricher Racing with Meyer Shank Racing; (United States) / Meyer Shank Racing with Curb-Agajanian	Acura NSX GT3 Evo	Acura JNC1 3.5 L Turbo V6	57	(Denmark) Christina Nielsen	1–2, 4–6, 8, 11–12
(United States) / Heinricher Racing with Meyer Shank Racing; (United States) / Meyer Shank Racing with Curb-Agajanian	Acura NSX GT3 Evo	Acura JNC1 3.5 L Turbo V6	57	(Brazil) Bia Figueiredo	1–2, 6–7, 9, 12
(United States) / Heinricher Racing with Meyer Shank Racing; (United States) / Meyer Shank Racing with Curb-Agajanian	Acura NSX GT3 Evo	Acura JNC1 3.5 L Turbo V6	57	(Switzerland) Simona de Silvestro	1
(United States) / Heinricher Racing with Meyer Shank Racing; (United States) / Meyer Shank Racing with Curb-Agajanian	Acura NSX GT3 Evo	Acura JNC1 3.5 L Turbo V6	57	(United Kingdom) Alice Powell	10
(United States) / Heinricher Racing with Meyer Shank Racing; (United States) / Meyer Shank Racing with Curb-Agajanian	Acura NSX GT3 Evo	Acura JNC1 3.5 L Turbo V6	86	(Germany) Mario Farnbacher	All
(United States) / Heinricher Racing with Meyer Shank Racing; (United States) / Meyer Shank Racing with Curb-Agajanian	Acura NSX GT3 Evo	Acura JNC1 3.5 L Turbo V6	86	(United States) Trent Hindman	All
(United States) / Heinricher Racing with Meyer Shank Racing; (United States) / Meyer Shank Racing with Curb-Agajanian	Acura NSX GT3 Evo	Acura JNC1 3.5 L Turbo V6	86	(United States) Justin Marks	1–2, 6, 12
(United States) / Heinricher Racing with Meyer Shank Racing; (United States) / Meyer Shank Racing with Curb-Agajanian	Acura NSX GT3 Evo	Acura JNC1 3.5 L Turbo V6	86	(United States) A. J. Allmendinger	1
(United States) Scuderia Corsa	Ferrari 488 GT3	Ferrari F154CB 3.9 L Turbo V8	63	(United States) Cooper MacNeil	All
(United States) Scuderia Corsa	Ferrari 488 GT3	Ferrari F154CB 3.9 L Turbo V8	63	(Finland) Toni Vilander	All
(United States) Scuderia Corsa	Ferrari 488 GT3	Ferrari F154CB 3.9 L Turbo V8	63	(United States) Jeff Westphal	1–2, 6, 12
(United States) Scuderia Corsa	Ferrari 488 GT3	Ferrari F154CB 3.9 L Turbo V8	63	(Germany) Dominik Farnbacher	1
(United States) P1 Motorsports	Mercedes-AMG GT3	Mercedes-AMG M159 6.2 L V8	71	(Germany) Maximilian Buhk	1–2
(United States) P1 Motorsports	Mercedes-AMG GT3	Mercedes-AMG M159 6.2 L V8	71	(Colombia) J. C. Perez	1–2
(United States) P1 Motorsports	Mercedes-AMG GT3	Mercedes-AMG M159 6.2 L V8	71	(Germany) Fabian Schiller	1–2
(United States) P1 Motorsports	Mercedes-AMG GT3	Mercedes-AMG M159 6.2 L V8	71	(Austria) Dominik Baumann	1
(United States) Park Place Motorsports	Porsche 911 GT3 R	Porsche 4.0 L Flat-6	73	(United States) Patrick Long	1–2, 4–11
(United States) Park Place Motorsports	Porsche 911 GT3 R	Porsche 4.0 L Flat-6	73	(United States) Nicholas Boulle	1–2, 6
(United States) Park Place Motorsports	Porsche 911 GT3 R	Porsche 4.0 L Flat-6	73	(United States) Patrick Lindsey	1–2, 6–7, 9–11
(United States) Park Place Motorsports	Porsche 911 GT3 R	Porsche 4.0 L Flat-6	73	(Australia) Matt Campbell	1
(United States) Park Place Motorsports	Porsche 911 GT3 R	Porsche 4.0 L Flat-6	73	(Germany) Marco Seefried	4, 8
(United States) Park Place Motorsports	Porsche 911 GT3 R	Porsche 4.0 L Flat-6	73	(Canada) Zacharie Robichon	5
(United States) Lone Star Racing	Mercedes-AMG GT3	Mercedes-AMG M159 6.2 L V8	74	(United States) Lawson Aschenbach	4–5, 7, 9–10
(United States) Lone Star Racing	Mercedes-AMG GT3	Mercedes-AMG M159 6.2 L V8	74	(United States) Gar Robinson	4–5, 7, 9–10
(Canada) Compass Racing	McLaren 720S GT3	McLaren M840T 4.0 L Turbo V8	76	(United States) Paul Holton	4–5, 7–11
(Canada) Compass Racing	McLaren 720S GT3	McLaren M840T 4.0 L Turbo V8	76	(United States) Matt Plumb	4–5, 7–11
(Belgium) Audi Sport Team WRT Speedstar	Audi R8 LMS Evo	Audi DAR 5.2 L V10	88	(Canada) Roman De Angelis	1
(Belgium) Audi Sport Team WRT Speedstar	Audi R8 LMS Evo	Audi DAR 5.2 L V10	88	(United Kingdom) Ian James	1
(Belgium) Audi Sport Team WRT Speedstar	Audi R8 LMS Evo	Audi DAR 5.2 L V10	88	(South Africa) Kelvin van der Linde	1
(Belgium) Audi Sport Team WRT Speedstar	Audi R8 LMS Evo	Audi DAR 5.2 L V10	88	(Belgium) Frédéric Vervisch	1
(United States) Wright Motorsports	Porsche 911 GT3 R	Porsche 4.0 L Flat-6	91	(United States) Anthony Imperato	8–9
(United States) Wright Motorsports	Porsche 911 GT3 R	Porsche 4.0 L Flat-6	91	(Australia) Matt Campbell	8
(United States) Wright Motorsports	Porsche 911 GT3 R	Porsche 4.0 L Flat-6	91	(Norway) Dennis Olsen	9
(United States) Turner Motorsport	BMW M6 GT3	BMW S63 4.4 L Turbo V8	96	(United States) Bill Auberlen	All
(United States) Turner Motorsport	BMW M6 GT3	BMW S63 4.4 L Turbo V8	96	(United States) Robby Foley	All
(United States) Turner Motorsport	BMW M6 GT3	BMW S63 4.4 L Turbo V8	96	(United States) Dillon Machavern	1–2, 6, 12
(United States) Turner Motorsport	BMW M6 GT3	BMW S63 4.4 L Turbo V8	96	(Germany) Jens Klingmann	1
(Germany) NGT Motorsport by Herberth	Porsche 911 GT3 R	Porsche 4.0 L Flat-6	99	(Austria) Klaus Bachler	1
(Germany) NGT Motorsport by Herberth	Porsche 911 GT3 R	Porsche 4.0 L Flat-6	99	(Germany) Steffen Görig	1
(Germany) NGT Motorsport by Herberth	Porsche 911 GT3 R	Porsche 4.0 L Flat-6	99	(Germany) Jürgen Häring	1
(Germany) NGT Motorsport by Herberth	Porsche 911 GT3 R	Porsche 4.0 L Flat-6	99	(Germany) Sven Müller	1
(Germany) NGT Motorsport by Herberth	Porsche 911 GT3 R	Porsche 4.0 L Flat-6	99	(Germany) Alfred Renauer	1
(United States) Black Swan Racing	Porsche 911 GT3 R	Porsche 4.0 L Flat-6	540	(Germany) Marco Seefried	1, 6
(United States) Black Swan Racing	Porsche 911 GT3 R	Porsche 4.0 L Flat-6	540	(Germany) Dirk Werner	1, 6
(United States) Black Swan Racing	Porsche 911 GT3 R	Porsche 4.0 L Flat-6	540	(Italy) Matteo Cairoli	1
(United States) Black Swan Racing	Porsche 911 GT3 R	Porsche 4.0 L Flat-6	540	(United States) Tim Pappas	1
(United States) Black Swan Racing	Porsche 911 GT3 R	Porsche 4.0 L Flat-6	540	(United States) Marc Miller	6

== Race results ==
**Bold** indicates overall winner.

Rnd	Circuit	DPi Winning Team	LMP2 Winning Team	GTLM Winning Team	GTD Winning Team	Report
Rnd	Circuit	DPi Winning Drivers	LMP2 Winning Drivers	GTLM Winning Drivers	GTD Winning Drivers	Report
1	Daytona	**(United States) No. 10 Konica Minolta Cadillac**	(United States) No. 18 DragonSpeed	(United States) No. 25 BMW Team RLL	(Austria) No. 11 GRT Grasser Racing Team	Report
1	Daytona	**(Spain) Fernando Alonso** **(Japan) Kamui Kobayashi** **(United States) Jordan Taylor** **(Netherlands) Renger van der Zande**	(Republic of Ireland) Ryan Cullen (Mexico) Roberto González (Venezuela) Pastor Maldonado (Colombia) Sebastián Saavedra	(United States) Connor De Phillippi (Austria) Philipp Eng (Brazil) Augusto Farfus (United States) Colton Herta	(Italy) Mirko Bortolotti (Netherlands) Rik Breukers (Germany) Christian Engelhart (Switzerland) Rolf Ineichen	Report
2	Sebring	**(United States) No. 31 Whelen Engineering Racing**	(United States) No. 38 Performance Tech Motorsports	(United States) No. 911 Porsche GT Team	(Austria) No. 11 GRT Grasser Racing Team	Report
2	Sebring	**(United States) Eric Curran** **(Brazil) Pipo Derani** **(Brazil) Felipe Nasr**	(Canada) Cameron Cassels (United States) Andrew Evans (United States) Kyle Masson	(France) Frédéric Makowiecki (France) Patrick Pilet (United Kingdom) Nick Tandy	(Italy) Mirko Bortolotti (Netherlands) Rik Breukers (Switzerland) Rolf Ineichen	Report
3	Long Beach	**(United States) No. 5 Mustang Sampling Racing**	did not participate	(United States) No. 912 Porsche GT Team	did not participate	Report
3	Long Beach	**(Portugal) Filipe Albuquerque** **(Portugal) Joao Barbosa**	did not participate	(New Zealand) Earl Bamber (Belgium) Laurens Vanthoor	did not participate	Report
4	Mid-Ohio	**(United States) No. 6 Acura Team Penske**	(United States) No. 52 PR1/Mathiasen Motorsports	(United States) No. 912 Porsche GT Team	(Canada) No. 14 AIM Vasser Sullivan	Report
4	Mid-Ohio	**(United States) Dane Cameron** **(Colombia) Juan Pablo Montoya**	(United States) Eric Lux (United States) Matt McMurry	(New Zealand) Earl Bamber (Belgium) Laurens Vanthoor	(United Kingdom) Jack Hawksworth (United States) Richard Heistand	Report
5	Belle Isle	**(United States) No. 6 Acura Team Penske**	did not participate	did not participate	(Canada) No. 14 AIM Vasser Sullivan	Report
5	Belle Isle	**(United States) Dane Cameron** **(Colombia) Juan Pablo Montoya**	did not participate	did not participate	(United Kingdom) Jack Hawksworth (United States) Richard Heistand	Report
6	Watkins Glen	**(Germany) No. 55 Mazda Team Joest**	(United States) No. 52 PR1/Mathiasen Motorsports	(United States) No. 911 Porsche GT Team	(United States) No. 86 Meyer Shank Racing with Curb-Agajanian	Report
6	Watkins Glen	**(United States) Jonathan Bomarito** **(France) Olivier Pla** **(United Kingdom) Harry Tincknell**	(France) Gabriel Aubry (United States) Eric Lux (United States) Matt McMurry	(France) Patrick Pilet (United Kingdom) Nick Tandy	(Germany) Mario Farnbacher (United States) Trent Hindman (United States) Justin Marks	Report
7	Mosport	**(Germany) No. 77 Mazda Team Joest**	(United States) No. 52 PR1/Mathiasen Motorsports	(United States) No. 912 Porsche GT Team	(United States) No. 96 Turner Motorsport	Report
7	Mosport	**(United Kingdom) Oliver Jarvis** **(United States) Tristan Nunez**	(Canada) Dalton Kellett (United States) Matt McMurry	(New Zealand) Earl Bamber (Belgium) Laurens Vanthoor	(United States) Bill Auberlen (United States) Robby Foley	Report
8	Lime Rock	did not participate	did not participate	**(United States) No. 67 Ford Chip Ganassi Racing**	(Canada) No. 9 Pfaff Motorsports	Report
8	Lime Rock	did not participate	did not participate	**(Australia) Ryan Briscoe** **(United Kingdom) Richard Westbrook**	(Norway) Dennis Olsen (Canada) Zacharie Robichon	Report
9	Road America	**(Germany) No. 55 Mazda Team Joest**	(United States) No. 52 PR1/Mathiasen Motorsports	(United States) No. 67 Ford Chip Ganassi Racing	(Canada) No. 9 Pfaff Motorsports	Report
9	Road America	**(United States) Jonathan Bomarito** **(United Kingdom) Harry Tincknell**	(United States) Patrick Kelly (United States) Matt McMurry	(Australia) Ryan Briscoe (United Kingdom) Richard Westbrook	(Australia) Matt Campbell (Canada) Zacharie Robichon	Report
10	Virginia	did not participate	did not participate	**(United States) No. 911 Porsche GT Team**	(United States) No. 33 Mercedes-AMG Team Riley Motorsport	Report
10	Virginia	did not participate	did not participate	**(France) Patrick Pilet** **(United Kingdom) Nick Tandy**	(Netherlands) Jeroen Bleekemolen (United States) Ben Keating	Report
11	Laguna Seca	**(United States) No. 6 Acura Team Penske**	(United States) No. 52 PR1/Mathiasen Motorsports	(United States) No. 66 Ford Chip Ganassi Racing	(United States) No. 48 Paul Miller Racing	Report
11	Laguna Seca	**(United States) Dane Cameron** **(Colombia) Juan Pablo Montoya**	(Canada) Dalton Kellett (United States) Matt McMurry	(United States) Joey Hand (Germany) Dirk Müller	(United States) Corey Lewis (United States) Bryan Sellers	Report
12	Road Atlanta	**(United States) No. 31 Whelen Engineering Racing**	(United States) No. 52 PR1/Mathiasen Motorsports	(United States) No. 62 Risi Competizione	(United States) No. 96 Turner Motorsport	Report
12	Road Atlanta	**(United States) Eric Curran** **(Brazil) Pipo Derani** **(Brazil) Felipe Nasr**	(France) Gabriel Aubry (Canada) Dalton Kellett (United States) Matt McMurry	(United Kingdom) James Calado (Italy) Alessandro Pier Guidi (Brazil) Daniel Serra	(United States) Bill Auberlen (United States) Robby Foley (United States) Dillon Machavern	Report

== Championship standings ==
=== Points systems ===
Championship points are awarded in each class at the finish of each event. Points are awarded based on finishing positions as shown in the chart below.

Position	1	2	3	4	5	6	7	8	9	10	11	12	13	14	15	16	17	18	19	20	21	22	23	24	25	26	27	28	29	30
Race	35	32	30	28	26	25	24	23	22	21	20	19	18	17	16	15	14	13	12	11	10	9	8	7	6	5	4	3	2	1

Drivers points

Points are awarded in each class at the finish of each event.

Team points

Team points are calculated in exactly the same way as driver points, using the point distribution chart. Each car entered is considered its own "team" regardless if it is a single entry or part of a two-car team.

Manufacturer points

There are also a number of manufacturer championships which utilize the same season-long point distribution chart. The manufacturer championships recognized by IMSA are as follows:

Daytona Prototype international (DPi): Engine & bodywork manufacturer
GT Le Mans (GTLM): Car manufacturer
GT Daytona (GTD): Car manufacturer

Each manufacturer receives finishing points for its highest finishing car in each class. The positions of subsequent finishing cars from the same manufacturer are not taken into consideration, and all other manufacturers move up in the order.

Example: Manufacturer A finishes 1st and 2nd at an event, and Manufacturer B finishes 3rd. Manufacturer A receives 35 first-place points while Manufacturer B would earn 32 second-place points.

Michelin Endurance Cup

The points system for the Michelin Endurance Cup is different from the normal points system. Points are awarded on a 5–4–3–2 basis for drivers, teams and manufacturers. The first finishing position at each interval earns five points, four points for second position, three points for third, with two points awarded for fourth and each subsequent finishing position.

Position	1	2	3	Other Classified
Race	5	4	3	2

At Daytona (24 hour race), points are awarded at six hours, 12 hours, 18 hours and at the finish. At the Sebring (12 hour race), points are awarded at four hours, eight hours and at the finish. At Watkins Glen (6 hour race), points are awarded at three hours and at the finish. At Road Atlanta (10 hour race), points are awarded at four hours, eight hours and at the finish.

Like the season-long team championship, Michelin Endurance Cup team points are awarded for each car and drivers get points in any car that they drive, in which they are entered for points. The manufacturer points go to the highest placed car from that manufacturer (the others from that manufacturer not being counted), just like the season-long manufacturer championship.

For example: in any particular segment manufacturer A finishes 1st and 2nd and manufacturer B finishes 3rd. Manufacturer A only receives first-place points for that segment. Manufacturer B receives the second-place points.

=== Drivers' championships ===
Race is part of the Michelin Endurance Cup
Race is part of the WeatherTech Sprint Cup

==== DPi ====
Pos.	Driver	**DAY**	**SEB**	LBH	MOH	BEL	**WGL**	MOS	ELK	LGA	**ATL**	Points	MEC
1	(United States) Dane Cameron (Colombia) Juan Pablo Montoya	6	**9**	3	1	**1**	3	3	**2**	1	4	302	29
2	(Brazil) Pipo Derani (Brazil) Felipe Nasr	2	1	6	4	2	7	4	4	3	**1**	297	45
3	(Brazil) Helio Castroneves (United States) Ricky Taylor	3	4	**2**	5	3	5	**5**	7	**2**	3	284	30
4	(United States) Jordan Taylor (Netherlands) Renger van der Zande	1	2	10	6	9	4	6	5	4	2	274	42
5	(United Kingdom) Oliver Jarvis (United States) Tristan Nunez	**11**	11	4	**2**	10	**2**	1	3	6	6	268	30
6	(United States) Jonathan Bomarito	9	6	8	3	11	1	2	1	10	11	263	31
7	(Portugal) Filipe Albuquerque (Portugal) João Barbosa	7	3	1	8	6	6	10	6	5	7	258	33
8	(Switzerland) Simon Trummer (South Africa) Stephen Simpson	10	8	5	7	4	9	8	9	9	5	237	24
9	(United Kingdom) Harry Tincknell	9	6	8		11	1	2	1	10	11	233	31
10	(United States) Colin Braun (United States) Jon Bennett	4	5	11	11	7	11	7	10	7	8	230	24
11	(Canada) Mikhail Goikhberg (France) Tristan Vautier	5	7	9	10	5	10	9	8	8	9	230	24
12	(United States) Will Owen	8	10	7	9	8	8	11			10	177	24
13	(United States) Eric Curran	2	1				7				**1**	126	45
14	(France) Olivier Pla	9	6				1				11	102	31
15	(Germany) Timo Bernhard	**11**	11				**2**				6	97	30
16	(France) Romain Dumas	4	5				11				8	97	24
17	(United States) Chris Miller	10	8				9				5	92	24
18	(Austria) René Binder	8	10				8				10	88	24
19	(Colombia) Juan Piedrahita	10	7				10				9	88	24
20	(France) Simon Pagenaud	6	**9**								4	75	24
21	(United States) Kyle Kaiser	8		7	9							69	8
22	(France) Matthieu Vaxivière		2								2	64	18
23	(United States) Alexander Rossi	3	4									58	19
24	(United Kingdom) Mike Conway						6				7	49	15
25	(Argentina) Agustin Canapino	8	10									44	14
26	(Brazil) Victor Franzoni					8		11				43	–
27	(Spain) Fernando Alonso (Japan) Kamui Kobayashi	1										35	18
28	(New Zealand) Brendon Hartley		3									30	10
29	(United States) Ryan Hunter-Reay				3							30	–
30	(United States) Graham Rahal										3	30	7
31	(France) Loïc Duval	4										28	8
32	(Brazil) Rubens Barrichello (Canada) Devlin DeFrancesco	5										26	8
33	(Brazil) Christian Fittipaldi	7										24	8
34	(United States) Spencer Pigot										10	21	6
35	(Germany) René Rast	11										20	8
Pos.	Driver	**DAY**	**SEB**	LBH	MOH	BEL	**WGL**	MOS	ELK	LGA	**ATL**	Points	MEC

==== LMP2 ====
Pos.	Driver	**DAY**	**SEB**	MOH	**WGL**	MOS	ELK	LGA	**ATL**	Points	MEC
1	(United States) Matt McMurry	4	**2**	1	**1**	1	1	**1**	1	270	44
2	(Canada) Cameron Cassels	2	1	**2**	2	**2**	**2**	2	**2**	257	49
3	(United States) Kyle Masson	2	1	**2**	2	**2**		2	**2**	227	49
4	(France) Gabriel Aubry	4	2		**1**				1	130	44
5	(Canada) Dalton Kellett					1		**1**	1	105	15
6	(United States) Andrew Evans		1		2				**2**	99	36
7	(United States) Eric Lux			1	**1**					70	9
8	(Colombia) Sebastián Saavedra (Venezuela) Pastor Maldonado (Republic of Ireland) Ryan Cullen (Mexico) Roberto González	1								35	19
9	(United States) Patrick Kelly						1			35	–
10	(United States) Robert Masson (United States) Kris Wright	2								32	13
11	(Denmark) Anders Fjordbach		2							32	12
12	(United States) James French						**2**			32	–
13	(Sweden) Henrik Hedman (United Kingdom) Ben Hanley (Australia) James Allen (France) Nicolas Lapierre	**3**								30	16
14	(France) Enzo Guibbert (United States) Mark Kvamme	4								28	8
Pos.	Driver	**DAY**	**SEB**	MOH	**WGL**	MOS	ELK	LGA	**ATL**	Points	MEC

==== GTLM ====
Pos.	Driver	**DAY**	**SEB**	LBH	MOH	**WGL**	MOS	LIM	ELK	VIR	LGA	**ATL**	Points	MEC
1	(New Zealand) Earl Bamber (Belgium) Laurens Vanthoor	3	5	1	1	6	1	**2**	3	**2**	7	5	330	31
2	(France) Patrick Pilet (United Kingdom) Nick Tandy	**5**	**1**	**5**	3	1	3	4	7	1	8	6	317	37
3	(Spain) Antonio Garcia (Denmark) Jan Magnussen	6	3	2	2	2	7	5	**4**	3	3	4	317	30
4	(Australia) Ryan Briscoe (United Kingdom) Richard Westbrook	4	6	6	5	3	5	1	1	5	6	2	313	38
5	(Germany) Dirk Müller	7	2	4	**7**	4	6	3	2	6	1	8	306	31
6	(United States) Connor De Phillippi	1	7	7	4	7	4	7	5	7	5	3	293	29
7	(United States) John Edwards (Finland) Jesse Krohn	9	4	8	6	5	**2**	8	8	8	**2**	9	279	26
8	(United Kingdom) Oliver Gavin	8	8	3	8	8	8	6	6	4	4	7	275	27
9	(United Kingdom) Tom Blomqvist		7	7	4	7	4	7	5	7	5	3	258	18
10	(United States) Joey Hand	7	2			4	6	3	2	6	1	8	254	31
11	(United States) Tommy Milner	8	8	3	8	8			6	4	4	7	227	27
12	(France) Sébastien Bourdais	7	2	4	**7**							8	131	27
13	(Switzerland) Marcel Fässler	8	8				8	6				7	118	23
14	(United States) Colton Herta	1	7									3	89	25
15	(France) Frédéric Makowiecki	**5**	**1**									6	86	27
16	(Austria) Philipp Eng	1	4									9	85	25
17	(New Zealand) Scott Dixon	4	6									2	85	33
18	(Germany) Mike Rockenfeller	6	3									4	83	23
19	(France) Mathieu Jaminet	3	5									5	82	25
20	(United Kingdom) James Calado (Italy) Alessandro Pier Guidi	2										**1**	67	29
21	(Brazil) Augusto Farfus	1											35	11
22	(Brazil) Daniel Serra											**1**	35	13
23	(Spain) Miguel Molina (Italy) Davide Rigon	2											32	16
24	(Australia) Chaz Mostert (Italy) Alex Zanardi	9											22	8
Pos.	Driver	**DAY**	**SEB**	LBH	MOH	**WGL**	MOS	LIM	ELK	VIR	LGA	**ATL**	Points	MEC

==== GTD ====
Pos.	Driver	**DAY**	**SEB**	**MOH**	**BEL**†	**WGL**	**MOS**	**LIM**	**ELK**	**VIR**	**LGA**	**ATL**	Points	WTSC	MEC
1	(Germany) Mario Farnbacher (United States) Trent Hindman	4	**7**	2	11	**1**	2	**2**	5	2	8	12	283	197	31
2	(United States) Bill Auberlen (United States) Robby Foley	9	13	15	10	2	**1**	3	3	11	7	1	262	176	34
3	(Canada) Zacharie Robichon	16	10	12	**2**	6	5	1	1	**4**	4	3	262	203	29
4	(United States) Andy Lally (United States) John Potter	10	2	8	4	7	8	8	6	6	3	8	249	177	26
5	(Finland) Toni Vilander (United States) Cooper MacNeil	23^{2}	3	7	12	3	9	11	7	3	2	5	246	171	35
6	(United States) Richard Heistand (United Kingdom) Jack Hawksworth	5	15	**1**	1	5	12	6	4	13	9	9	237	182	24
7	(Netherlands) Jeroen Bleekemolen (United States) Ben Keating	6	5	14		15	7	9	**14**	1	5	4	236	141	37
8	(United States) Frankie Montecalvo (United States) Townsend Bell	2	9	5	3	9	3	13	9	7	11	11	236	170	27
9	(United Kingdom) Katherine Legge	12	8	10	9	4	6	12	13	12	6	7	221	149	25
10	(United States) Bryan Sellers	15	16	3	5	14	DNS	7	2	10	**1**	**6**	215	168	24
11	(United States) Patrick Long	7	6	4	2	13	4	4	15	5	DNS		193	158	18
12	(Canada) Scott Hargrove	16	10	12		6	5			**4**	4	3	192	101	29
13	(United States) Corey Lewis	15	16			14		7	2	10	**1**	**6**	185	112	24
14	(Denmark) Christina Nielsen	12	8	10	9	4		12			6	7	159	87	25
15	(United States) Patrick Lindsey	7	6			13	4		15	5	DNS		137	70	18
16	(Brazil) Bia Figueiredo	12	8			4	6		13			7	137	43	25
17	(United States) Paul Holton (United States) Matt Plumb			13	8		10	10	12	9	10		122	145	–
18	(Germany) Marco Seefried	14		4		10		4				**6**	119	56	19
19	(United States) Parker Chase	13	14	9	6	12			10			9	119	68	24
20	(United States) Dillon Machavern	9	13			2						1	107	–	34
21	(United States) Justin Marks	4	**7**			**1**						12	106	–	31
22	(United States) Lawson Aschenbach		12	11	7		11		11	8			102	107	6
23	(United States) Spencer Pumpelly	10	2			7						8	100	–	26
24	(United Kingdom) Ryan Dalziel	13	14	9	6	12			10				97	68	14
25	(United States) Aaron Telitz	2	9			9						11	96	–	27
26	(Brazil) Felipe Fraga	6	5			15						4	95	–	37
27	(United States) Jeff Westphal	23^{2}	3			3						5	94	–	35
28	(Canada) Daniel Morad (Germany) Christopher Mies (Switzerland) Ricardo Feller	22^{1}	4			8						2	92	–	34
29	(Germany) Lars Kern	16	10			6						3	91	–	29
30	(Australia) Matt Campbell	7						5	1				85	61	8
31	(United States) Gar Robinson			11	7		11		11	8			83	107	–
32	(United States) Ryan Hardwick	15	16	3	5	14	DNS						78	56	18
33	(Norway) Dennis Olsen	16						1	8				73	58	8
34	(United States) Don Yount	18	12			11						10	73	–	24
35	(Italy) Mirko Bortolotti (Netherlands) Rik Breukers (Switzerland) Rolf Ineichen	1	1										70	–	22
36	(United States) Nicholas Boulle	7	6			13							67	–	18
37	(United States) Brandon Gdovic		12			11						10	60	–	10
38	(United States) Will Hardeman (Spain) Alex Riberas	11	17	6		DNS							59	25	18
39	(United States) Anthony Imperato							5	8				49	49	–
40	(Switzerland) Philipp Frommenwiler		15			5							42	–	10
41	(Germany) Dirk Werner	14				10							38	–	13
42	(Germany) Christian Engelhart	1											35	–	11
43	(Argentina) Ezequiel Pérez Companc	13	14										35	–	14
44	(United States) Andrew Davis	11	17			DNS							34	–	18
45	(United States) Jeff Segal	2											32	–	10
46	(Germany) Fabian Schiller (Germany) Maximilian Buhk (Colombia) J. C. Perez	19	11										32	–	14
47	(Belgium) Frédéric Vervisch (South Africa) Kelvin van der Linde (United Kingdom) Ian James (Canada) Roman De Angelis	3											30	–	9
48	(United States) A. J. Allmendinger	4											28	–	11
49	(United States) Austin Cindric (New Zealand) Nick Cassidy	5											26	–	8
50	(Germany) Luca Stolz	6											25	–	14
51	(Brazil) Chico Longo (Brazil) Victor Franzoni (Brazil) Marcos Gomes (Italy) Andrea Bertolini	**8**											23	–	8
52	(Germany) Jens Klingmann	9											22	–	9
53	(Italy) Marco Mapelli	10											21	–	8
54	(United States) Marc Miller					10							21	–	4
55	(United States) Shinya Michimi											10	21	–	6
56	(Germany) Markus Winkelhock	11											20	–	8
57	(United States) Jake Eidson					11							20	–	4
58	(Switzerland) Simona de Silvestro	12											19	–	8
59	(United Kingdom) Alice Powell									12			19	19	–
60	(United States) Mike Skeen					12							19	–	4
61	(Germany) Christopher Haase	13											18	–	8
62	(United States) Tim Pappas (Italy) Matteo Cairoli	14											17	–	9
63	(Italy) Andrea Caldarelli	15											16	–	8
64	(Italy) Fabio Babini (Italy) Emanuele Busnelli (United Kingdom) Taylor Proto (Italy) Giacomo Altoè	17											14	–	8
65	(Serbia) Miloš Pavlović (United States) Steve Dunn (Sweden) Linus Lundqvist	18											13	–	8
66	(Austria) Dominik Baumann	19											12	–	8
67	(Canada) Paul Dalla Lana (Portugal) Pedro Lamy (Austria) Mathias Lauda (Brazil) Daniel Serra	20											11	–	8
68	(Austria) Klaus Bachler (Germany) Sven Müller (Germany) Alfred Renauer (Germany) Jürgen Häring (Germany) Steffen Görig	21											10	–	8
69	(Belgium) Dries Vanthoor	22^{1}											9	–	12
70	(Germany) Dominik Farnbacher	23^{2}											8	–	10
Pos.	Driver	**DAY**	**SEB**	**MOH**	**BEL**†	**WGL**	**MOS**	**LIM**	**ELK**	**VIR**	**LGA**	**ATL**	Points	WTSC	MEC

† Points only counted towards the WeatherTech Sprint Cup, and not the overall GTD Championship.

^{1} Originally finished 2nd in class, but demoted to last after violating minimum drive time regulations.
^{2} Originally finished 14th in class, but demoted to last after violating minimum drive time regulations.

=== Team's Championships ===
==== Standings: Daytona Prototype international ====
Pos.	Team	**DAY**	**SEB**	LBH	MOH	BEL	**WGL**	MOS	ELK	LGA	**ATL**	Points	MEC
1	#6 Acura Team Penske	6	**9**	3	1	**1**	3	3	**2**	1	4	302	29
2	#31 Whelen Engineering Racing	2	1	6	4	2	7	4	4	3	**1**	297	45
3	#7 Acura Team Penske	3	4	**2**	5	3	5	**5**	7	**2**	3	284	30
4	#10 Konica Minolta Cadillac	1	2	10	6	9	4	6	5	4	2	274	42
5	#77 Mazda Team Joest	**11**	11	4	**2**	10	**2**	1	3	6	6	268	30
6	#55 Mazda Team Joest	9	6	8	3	11	1	2	1	10	11	263	31
7	#5 Mustang Sampling Racing	7	3	1	8	6	6	10	6	5	7	258	33
8	#84 JDC-Miller MotorSports	10	8	5	7	4	9	8	9	9	5	237	24
9	#54 CORE Autosport	4	5	11	11	7	11	7	10	7	8	230	24
10	#85 JDC-Miller MotorSports	5	7	9	10	5	10	9	8	8	9	230	24
11	#50 Juncos Racing	8	10	7	9	8	8	11			10	177	24
Pos.	Team	**DAY**	**SEB**	LBH	MOH	BEL	**WGL**	MOS	ELK	LGA	**ATL**	Points	MEC

==== Standings: Le Mans Prototype 2 ====
Pos.	Team	**DAY**	**SEB**	MOH	**WGL**	MOS	ELK	LGA	**ATL**	Points	MEC
1	#52 PR1/Mathiasen Motorsports	4	**2**	**1**	**1**	1	1	**1**	1	270	44
2	#38 Performance Tech Motorsports	2	1	2	2	**2**	**2**	2	**2**	259	49
3	#18 DragonSpeed	1								35	19
4	#81 DragonSpeed	**3**								30	16
Pos.	Team	**DAY**	**SEB**	MOH	**WGL**	MOS	ELK	LGA	**ATL**	Points	MEC

==== Standings: GT Le Mans ====
Pos.	Team	**DAY**	**SEB**	LBH	MOH	**WGL**	MOS	LIM	ELK	VIR	LGA	**ATL**	Points	MEC
1	#912 Porsche GT Team	3	5	1	1	6	1	**2**	3	**2**	7	5	330	31
2	#911 Porsche GT Team	**5**	**1**	**5**	3	1	3	4	7	1	8	6	317	37
3	#3 Corvette Racing	6	3	2	2	**2**	7	5	**4**	3	3	4	317	30
4	#67 Ford Chip Ganassi Racing	4	6	6	5	3	5	1	1	5	6	2	313	38
5	#66 Ford Chip Ganassi Racing	7	2	4	**7**	4	6	3	2	6	1	8	306	31
6	#25 BMW Team RLL	1	7	7	4	7	4	7	5	7	5	3	293	29
7	#24 BMW Team RLL	9	4	8	6	5	**2**	8	8	8	**2**	9	279	26
8	#4 Corvette Racing	8	8	3	8	8	8	6	6	4	4	7	275	27
9	#62 Risi Competizione	2										**1**	67	29
Pos.	Team	**DAY**	**SEB**	LBH	MOH	**WGL**	MOS	LIM	ELK	VIR	LGA	**ATL**	Points	MEC

==== Standings: GT Daytona ====
Pos.	Team	**DAY**	**SEB**	**MOH**	**BEL**†	**WGL**	**MOS**	**LIM**	**ELK**	**VIR**	**LGA**	**ATL**	Points	WTSC	MEC
1	#86 Meyer-Shank Racing with Curb Agajanian	4	**7**	2	11	**1**	2	**2**	5	2	8	12	283	197	31
2	#96 Turner Motorsport	9	13	15	10	2	**1**	3	3	11	7	1	262	176	34
3	#9 Pfaff Motorsports	16	10	12		6	5	1	1	**4**	4	3	262	171	29
4	#44 Magnus Racing	10	2	8	4	7	8	8	6	6	3	8	249	177	26
5	#63 Scuderia Corsa	23^{2}	3	7	12	3	9	11	7	3	2	5	246	171	35
6	#14 AIM Vasser Sullivan	5	15	**1**	1	5	12	6	4	13	9	9	237	182	24
7	#33 Mercedes-AMG Team Riley Motorsports	6	5	14		15	7	9	**14**	1	5	4	236	141	37
8	#12 AIM Vasser Sullivan	2	9	5	3	9	3	13	9	7	11	11	235	170	27
9	#57 Heinricher Racing with Meyer-Shank Racing	12	8	10	9	4	6	12	13	12	6	7	221	149	25
10	#48 Paul Miller Racing	15	16	3	5	14	DNS	7	2	10	**1**	**6**	215	168	24
11	#73 Park Place Motorsports	7	6	4	**2**	13	4	4	15	5	DNS		193	158	18
12	#76 Compass Racing			13	8		10	10	12	9	10		122	145	–
13	#8 Starworks Motorsport	13	14	9	6	12			10				97	68	18
14	#29 Montaplast by Land-Motorsport	22^{1}	4			8						2	92	–	34
15	#74 Lone Star Racing			11	7		11		11	8			83	107	–
16	#47 Precision Performance Motorsports	18	12			11						10	24	–	18
17	#11 GRT Grasser Racing Team	1	1										70	–	22
18	#19 Moorespeed	11	17	6		DNS							59	25	14
19	#91 Wright Motorsports							5	8				49	49	–
20	#540 Black Swan Racing	14				10							38	–	13
21	#71 P1 Motorsports	19	11										32	–	14
22	#88 WRT Speedstar Audi Sport	3											30	–	9
23	#13 Via Italia Racing	**8**											23	–	8
24	#46 Ebimotors	17											14	–	8
25	#51 Spirit of Race	20											11	–	8
26	#99 NGT Motorsport	21											10	–	8
Pos.	Team	**DAY**	**SEB**	**MOH**	**BEL**†	**WGL**	**MOS**	**LIM**	**ELK**	**VIR**	**LGA**	**ATL**	Points	WTSC	MEC

† Points only counted towards the WeatherTech Sprint Cup, and not the overall GTD Championship.

^{1} Originally finished 2nd in class, but demoted to last after violating minimum drive time regulations.
^{2} Originally finished 14th in class, but demoted to last after violating minimum drive time regulations.

=== Manufacturer's Championships ===
==== Standings: Daytona Prototype International ====
Pos.	Manufacturer	**DAY**	**SEB**	LBH	MOH	BEL	**WGL**	MOS	ELK	LGA	**ATL**	Points	MEC
1	(Japan) Acura	3	**4**	**2**	1	**1**	3	3	**2**	**1**	3	329	45
2	(United States) Cadillac	1	1	1	4	2	4	4	4	3	**1**	324	56
3	(Japan) Mazda	**9**	6	4	**2**	10	**1**	1	1	6	6	311	39
4	(Japan) Nissan	4	5	11	11	7	11	**7**	10	7	8	286	28
Pos.	Team	**DAY**	**SEB**	LBH	MOH	BEL	**WGL**	MOS	ELK	LGA	**ATL**	Points	MEC

==== Standings: GT Le Mans ====
Pos.	Manufacturer	**DAY**	**SEB**	LBH	MOH	**WGL**	MOS	LIM	ELK	VIR	LGA	**ATL**	Points	MEC
1	(Germany) Porsche	**3**	**1**	**1**	1	1	1	**2**	3	**1**	7	5	358	40
2	(United States) Ford	4	2	4	**5**	3	5	1	1	5	1	2	345	42
3	(United States) Chevrolet	6	3	2	2	2	7	5	**4**	3	3	4	330	35
4	(Germany) BMW	1	4	7	4	5	**2**	7	5	7	**2**	3	327	34
5	(Italy) Ferrari	2										**1**	67	31
Pos.	Team	**DAY**	**SEB**	LBH	MOH	**WGL**	MOS	LIM	ELK	VIR	LGA	**ATL**	Points	MEC

==== Standings: GT Daytona ====
Pos.	Manufacturer	**DAY**	**SEB**	**MOH**	**BEL**†	**WGL**	**MOS**	**LIM**	**ELK**	**VIR**	**LGA**	**ATL**	Points	WTSC	MEC
1	(Italy) Lamborghini	1	1	3	4	7	8	7	2	6	**1**	**6**	294	204	26
2	(Japan) Acura	4	**7**	2	9	**1**	2	**2**	5	2	6	7	292	204	32
3	(Germany) Porsche	7	6	4	**2**	6	4	1	1	**4**	4	3	291	216	30
4	(Germany) BMW	9	13	15	10	2	**1**	3	3	11	7	1	278	188	34
5	(Japan) Lexus	2	9	**1**	1	5	3	6	4	7	9	9	277	205	27
6	(Italy) Ferrari	**8**	3	7	12	3	9	11	7	3	2	5	271	181	36
7	(Germany) Mercedes-AMG	6	5	11	7	15	7	9	**11**	1	5	4	266	187	37
8	(Germany) Audi	3	4	6	6	8			10			2	166	78	36
9	(United Kingdom) McLaren			13	8		10	10	12	9	10		139	164	–
Pos.	Team	**DAY**	**SEB**	**MOH**	**BEL**	**WGL**	**MOS**	**LIM**	**ELK**	**VIR**	**LGA**	**ATL**	Points	WTSC	MEC

† Points only counted towards the WeatherTech Sprint Cup, and not the overall GTD Championship.
