= 2019 Northeast Grand Prix =

Eighth round of the 2019 IMSA SportsCar Championship season

Track map of Lime Rock Park

The 2019 Northeast Grand Prix was a sports car race sanctioned by the International Motor Sports Association (IMSA). The race was held at Lime Rock Park in Lakeville, Connecticut, on July 20, 2019, as the eighth round of the 2019 WeatherTech SportsCar Championship, and the fourth round of the 2019 WeatherTech Sprint Cup.

== Background ==
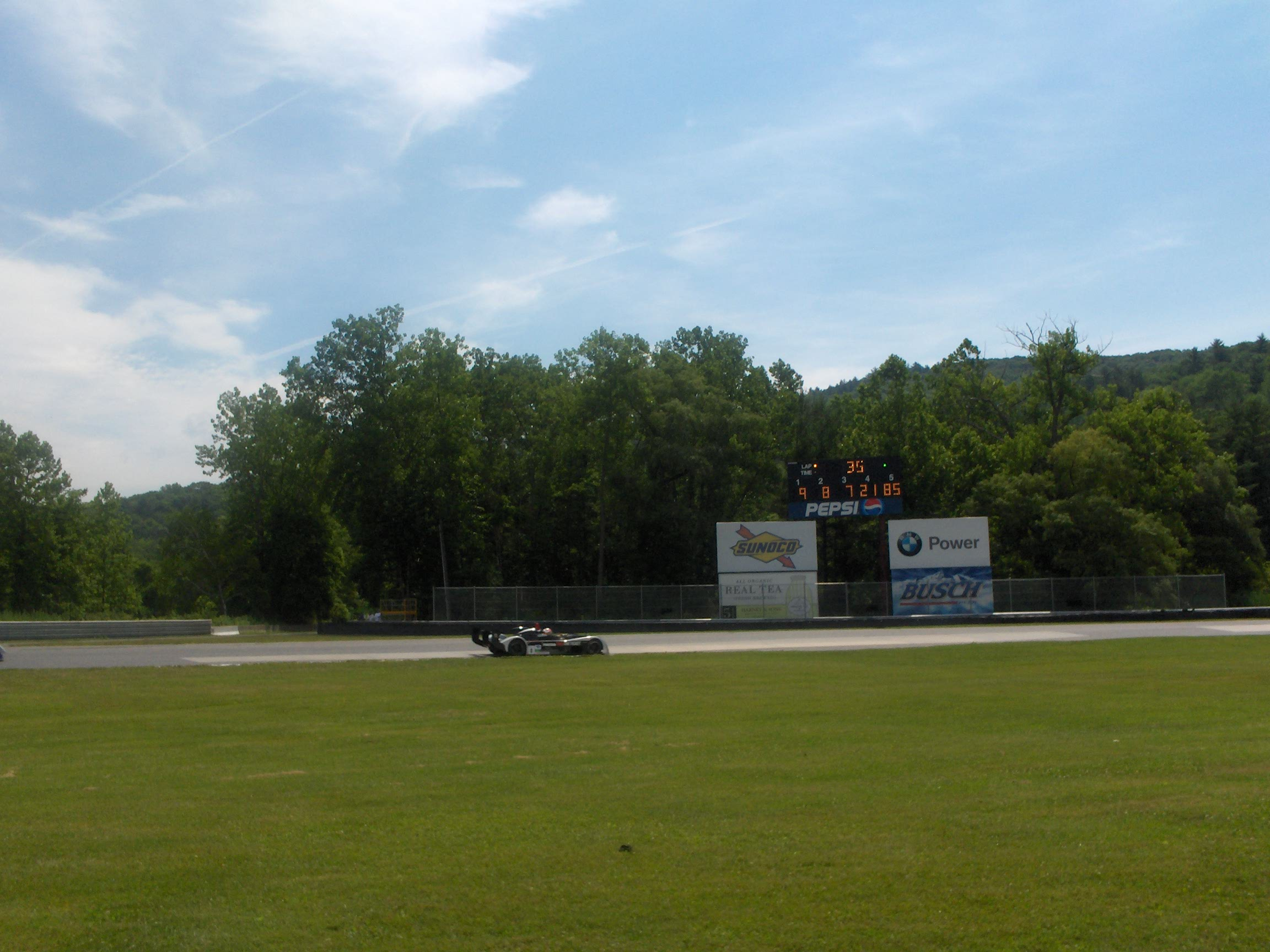
Lime Rock Park, where the race was held.

International Motor Sports Association's (IMSA) president Scott Atherton confirmed the race was part of the schedule for the 2019 IMSA SportsCar Championship (IMSA SCC) in August 2018. It was the fifth consecutive year the event was held as part of the WeatherTech SportsCar Championship and the twenty-seventh annual running of the race. The 2019 Northeast Grand Prix was the eighth of twelve sports car races of 2019 by IMSA, and it was the fourth of seven rounds held as part of the WeatherTech Sprint Cup. The race was held at the seven-turn 1.530 mi (2.462 km) Lime Rock Park in Lakeville, Connecticut on July 20, 2019. The race was the first of two GT-only rounds on the 2019 IMSA calendar in which the prototype classes, Daytona Prototype international (DPi) and Le Mans Prototype (LMP2) would not take part.

On July 11, 2019, IMSA released a technical bulletin regarding the Balance of Performance for the race. The GT Le Mans (GTLM) balance of performance constraints would remain as they were in the previous round at Canadian Tire Motorsport Park. In the GT Daytona (GTD) class, after winning the previous round, the BMW M6 GT3 was given a power reduction of 12 horsepower, as well as a 2-liter fuel capacity reduction and a restriction of turbo boost. The Ferrari 488 GT3 and the Porsche 911 GT3 R were made 10 and five kilograms lighter, respectively.

Before the race, Earl Bamber and Laurens Vanthoor led the GTLM Drivers' Championship with 186 points, ahead of Patrick Pilet and Nick Tandy in second. In GTD, Mario Farnbacher and Trent Hindman led the Drivers' Championship with 151 points; the duo held a nineteen-point advantage over Frankie Montecalvo and Townsend Bell in second followed by Bill Auberlen and Robby Foley with 123 points in third. Porsche and Acura were leading their respective Manufacturers' Championships, while Porsche GT Team and Meyer Shank Racing each led their own Teams' Championships.

=== Entries ===
A total 21 cars took part in the event split across two classes. There were eight cars entered in GTLM, and 13 in GTD. The most notable change to the grid included the return of Blancpain GT World Challenge America full-time team Wright Motorsports, with drivers Anthony Imperato and Porsche Junior Professional driver Matt Campbell. Pfaff Motorsports regular driver Scott Hargrove would sit out the Lime Rock Park event as well as the following event at Road America, replaced instead by Porsche Junior driver Dennis Olsen for the Lime Rock event. Olsen and Campbell would switch places for Road America. Due to this event happening 50 years and one day after the Apollo 11 Moon landing, GTD team Magnus Racing decided to commemorate the anniversary of the mission by launching a one-off livery designed to look like the Saturn V rocket, and run under the number 11. As Magnus Racing usually ran under car number 44, the team received special dispensation by IMSA to count the points they would score as number 11 towards their full-season points under number 44.

== Practice ==
There were three practice sessions preceding the start of the race on Saturday, one on Friday morning and two on Friday afternoon. The first session on Friday morning lasted 90 minutes while the second session on Friday afternoon lasted one hour. The third session on Friday afternoon lasted one hour.

=== Practice 1 ===
The first practice session took place at 11:25 am ET on Friday and ended with Nick Tandy topping the charts for Porsche GT Team, with a lap time of 50.065. Oliver Gavin was second fastest in the No. 4 Corvette followed by Connor De Phillippi in the No. 25 BMW Team RLL entry. Jan Magnussen in the No. 3 Corvette was fourth fastest and Richard Westbrook's No. 67 Ford GT rounded out the top five. The GTD class was topped by the No. 86 Meyer Shank Racing Acura NSX GT3 Evo of Mario Farnbacher with a time of 1:16.885. Jeroen Bleekemolen was second fastest in the No. 33 Mercedes-AMG followed by the No. 48 Paul Miller Racing Lamborghini of Bryan Sellers in third position. Patrick Long's No. 73 Park Place Motorsports Porsche was fourth fastest and Matt Campbell in the No. 91 Wright Motorsports Porsche rounded out the top five.

Pos.	Class	No.	Team	Driver	Time	Gap
1	GTLM	911	Porsche GT Team	Nick Tandy	50.050	_
2	GTLM	4	Corvette Racing	Oliver Gavin	50.398	+0.333
3	GLTM	25	BMW Team RLL	Connor De Phillippi	50.416	+0.351

=== Practice 2 ===
The second practice session took place at 2:20 PM ET on Friday and ended with Antonio García topping the charts for Corvette Racing, with a lap time of 50.302. Connor De Phillippi was second fastest in the No. 6 BMW Team RLL entry followed by Jesse Krohn in the sister No. 24 BMW. Richard Westbrook was fourth fastest in the No. 67 Ford Chip Ganassi Racing entry followed by teammate Joey Hand in the sister No. 66 Ford GT in fifth. The GTD class was topped by the No. 96 Turner Motorsport BMW M6 GT3 of Bill Auberlen with a time of 51.715. Toni Vilander was second fastest in the No. 63 Scuderia Corsa Ferrari followed by Dennis Olsen in the No. 9 Pfaff Motorsports Porsche in third position. Marco Seefried's No. 73 Park Place Motorsports Porsche was fourth fastest and Matt Campbell in the No. 91 Wright Motorsports Porsche rounded out the top five.

Pos.	Class	No.	Team	Driver	Time	Gap
1	GTLM	3	Corvette Racing	Antonio García	50.302	_
2	GTLM	25	BMW Team RLL	Connor De Phillippi	50.320	+0.018
3	GTLM	24	BMW Team RLL	Jesse Krohn	30.467	+0.165

=== Practice 3 ===
The third and final practice session took place at 4:55 pm ET Friday and ended with Nick Tandy topping the charts for Porsche GT Team, with a lap time of 49.782. Laurens Vanthoor was second fastest in the sister No. 912 Porsche followed by Richard Westbrook in the No. 67 Ford Chip Ganassi Racing entry. Oliver Gavin was fourth fastest in the No. 4 Corvette and Dirk Müller's No. 66 Ford GT rounded out the top five. The GTD class was topped by the No. 48 Paul Miller Racing Lamborghini Huracán GT3 Evo of Bryan Sellers with a time of 51.797. Patrick Long in the No. 73 Park Place Motorsports Porsche was second fastest followed by Mario Farnbacher's No. 86 Acura in third position. The No. 11 Magnus Racing Lamborghini of Andy Lally was fourth fastest and Zacharie Robichon's No. 9 Pfaff Motorsports Porsche rounded out the top five. The Turner Motorsport entry did not set a lap time. Marcel Fässler crashed the No. 4 Corvette Racing entry at turn five, damaging his vehicle's front nose, but managed to managed to return to the pitlane for repairs.

Pos.	Class	No.	Team	Driver	Time	Gap
1	GTLM	911	Porsche GT Team	Nick Tandy	49.782	_
2	GTLM	912	Porsche GT Team	Laurens Vanthoor	49.938	+0.156
3	GTLM	67	Ford Chip Ganassi Racing	Richard Westbrook	50.314	+0.582

== Qualifying ==
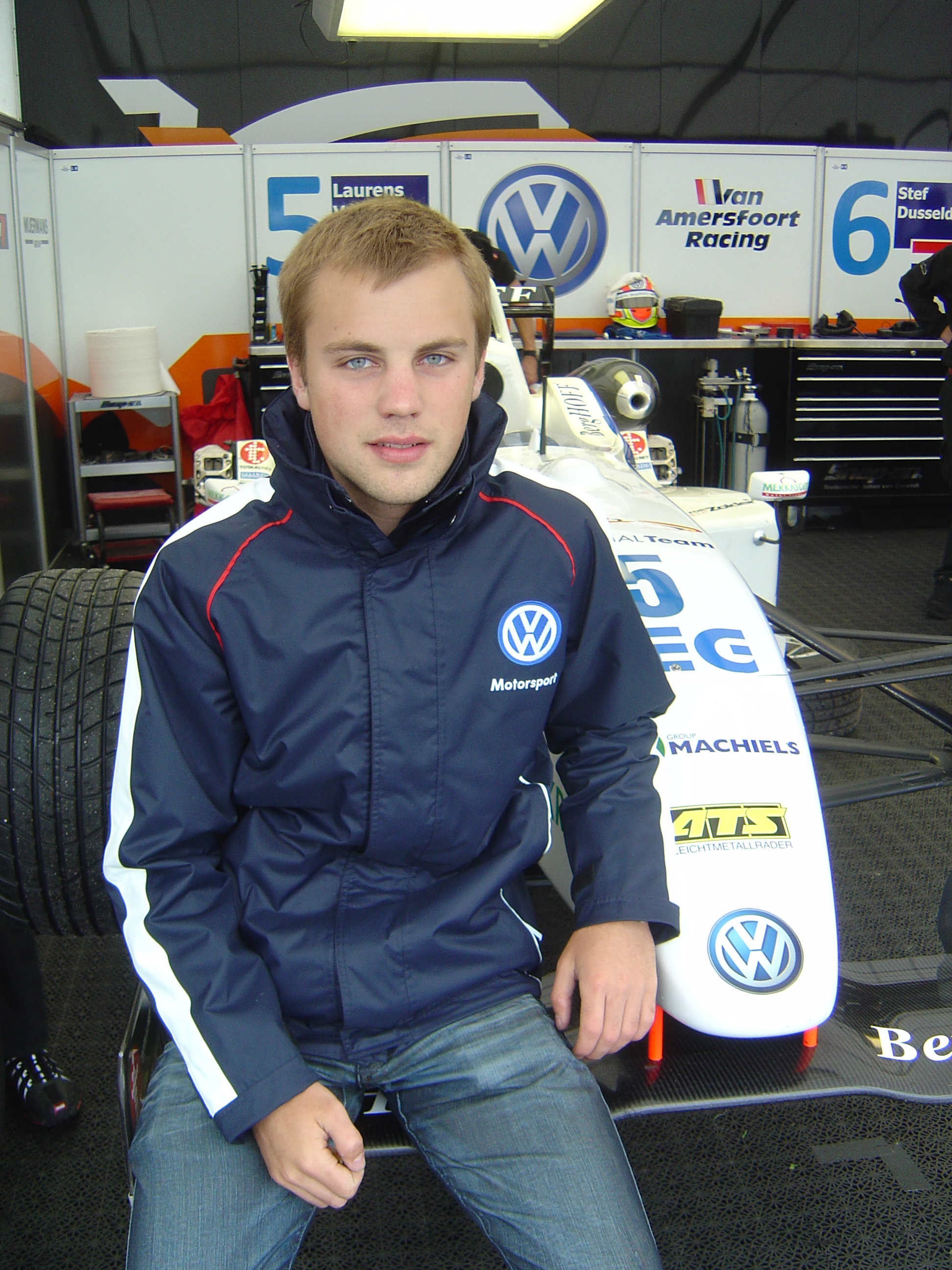
Laurens Vanthoor (pictured in 2009) helped take the No. 912 Porsche's first pole position of 2019.

Saturday's morning qualifying session was divided into two groups that lasted 15 minutes each. Cars in GTD were sent out first and, after a ten-minute interval, GTLM vehicles drove onto the track. All cars were required to be driven by one participant and the starting order was determined by the competitor's fastest lap. IMSA then arranged the grid so that the GTLM field started in front of all GTD cars.

The first was for cars in the GTD class. Trent Hindman qualified on pole for the class driving the No. 86 car for Meyer Shank Racing, beating Ben Keating in the No. 33 Mercedes-AMG by less than one-tenth of a second. The No. 48 Paul Miller Racing Lamborghini Huracán of Corey Lewis set the third fastest time. However, the team were sent to the back of the GTD grid after the car failed post-qualifying technical inspection where it was discovered that the Lamborghini was found to not have complied with mandated ride height. As a result, Robby Foleys No. 96 Turner Motorsport BMW was promoted to third position followed by Zacharie Robichon's No. 9 Pfaff Motorsports Porsche in fourth, and Richard Heistand's No. 12 Lexus in fifth position.

The final session of qualifying was for cars in the GTLM class. Laurens Vanthoor qualified on pole driving the No. 912 car for Porsche GT Team, beating teammate Nick Tandy in the sister No. 911 Porsche by 0.052 seconds. Following in third was Connor De Phillippi's No. 25 BMW followed by Dirk Müller in the No. 66 Ford GT in fourth. The Corvette Racing entries started fifth and sixth followed by Ryan Briscoe's No. 67 Ford GT in seventh position. John Edwards in the No. 24 BMW Team RLL entry rounded out the GTLM qualifiers.

=== Qualifying results ===
Pole positions in each class are indicated in bold and by ‡.

Pos.	Class	No.	Team	Driver	Time	Gap	Grid
1	**GTLM**	**912**	**(United States) Porsche GT Team**	**(Belgium) Laurens Vanthoor**	**49.133**	**_**	1 ‡
2	GTLM	911	(United States) Porsche GT Team	(United Kingdom) Nick Tandy	49.185	+0.052	2
3	GTLM	25	(United States) BMW Team RLL	(United States) Connor De Phillippi	49.322	+0.189	3
4	GTLM	66	(United States) Ford Chip Ganassi Racing	(Germany) Dirk Müller	49.458	+0.325	4
5	GTLM	3	(United States) Corvette Racing	(Spain) Antonio García	49.690	+0.557	5
6	GTLM	4	(United States) Corvette Racing	(United Kingdom) Oliver Gavin	49.748	+0.615	6
7	GTLM	67	(United States) Ford Chip Ganassi Racing	(Australia) Ryan Briscoe	49.808	+0.675	7
8	GTLM	24	(United States) BMW Team RLL	(United States) John Edwards	49.864	+0.731	8
9	**GTD**	**86**	**(United States) Meyer Shank Racing with Curb-Agajanian**	**(United States) Trent Hindman**	**51.456**	**+2.323**	9‡
10	GTD	33	(United States) Mercedes-AMG Team Riley Motorsports	(United States) Ben Keating	51.482	+2.349	10
11	GTD	48	(United States) Paul Miller Racing	(United States) Corey Lewis	51.532	+2.399	21^{1}
12	GTD	96	(United States) Turner Motorsport	(United States) Robby Foley	51.536	+2.403	11
13	GTD	9	(Canada) Pfaff Motorsports	(Canada) Zacharie Robichon	51.575	+2.442	12
14	GTD	14	(Canada) AIM Vasser Sullivan	(United States) Richard Heistand	51.642	+2.509	13
15	GTD	73	(United States) Park Place Motorsports	(Germany) Marco Seefried	51.661	+2.528	14
16	GTD	63	(United States) Scuderia Corsa	(United States) Cooper MacNeil	51.719	+2.586	15
17	GTD	91	(United States) Wright Motorsports	(United States) Anthony Imperato	51.785	+2.652	16
18	GTD	76	(Canada) Compass Racing	(United States) Matt Plumb	52.008	+2.875	17
19	GTD	57	(United States) Heinricher Racing w/Meyer Shank Racing	(Denmark) Christina Nielsen	52.059	+2.926	18
20	GTD	11	(United States) Magnus Racing	(United States) John Potter	52.226	+3.093	19
21	GTD	12	(Canada) AIM Vasser Sullivan	(United States) Frankie Montecalvo	52.236	+3.103	20
Sources:

- The No. 48 Paul Miller Racing entry was moved to the back of the GTD field for violating competition rules regarding the car's ride height.

== Race ==
=== Post-race ===
The final results of GTLM kept Bamber and Vanthoor atop the Drivers' Championship as they extended their advantage to eight points over Pilet and Tandy. Briscoe and Westbrook advanced from sixth to fourth. The final results of GTD meant Farnbacher and Hindman extended their advantage to 30 points as Auberlen and Foley took over second position. Long advanced from fifth to third while Montecalvo and Bell dropped from second to fourth. Porsche and Acura continued to top their respective Manufacturers' Championships, while Porsche GT Team and Meyer Shank Racing kept their respective advantages in their Teams' Championships with four rounds left in the season.

=== Race results ===
Class winners are denoted in bold and ‡.

Pos	Class	No.	Team	Drivers	Chassis	Laps	Time/Retired
Pos	Class	No.	Team	Drivers	Engine	Laps	Time/Retired
1	**GTLM**	**67**	**(United States) Ford Chip Ganassi Racing**	**(Australia) Ryan Briscoe (United Kingdom) Richard Westbrook**	**Ford GT**	**182**	**2:40:17.361 ‡**
1	**GTLM**	**67**	**(United States) Ford Chip Ganassi Racing**	**(Australia) Ryan Briscoe (United Kingdom) Richard Westbrook**	**Ford EcoBoost 3.5 L Turbo V6**	**182**	**2:40:17.361 ‡**
2	GTLM	912	(United States) Porsche GT Team	(New Zealand) Earl Bamber (Belgium) Laurens Vanthoor	Porsche 911 RSR	182	+7.003s
2	GTLM	912	(United States) Porsche GT Team	(New Zealand) Earl Bamber (Belgium) Laurens Vanthoor	Porsche 4.0 L Flat-6	182	+7.003s
3	GTLM	66	(United States) Ford Chip Ganassi Racing	(United States) Joey Hand (Germany) Dirk Müller	Ford GT	182	+7.526s
3	GTLM	66	(United States) Ford Chip Ganassi Racing	(United States) Joey Hand (Germany) Dirk Müller	Ford EcoBoost 3.5 L Turbo V6	182	+7.526s
4	GTLM	911	(United States) Porsche GT Team	(France) Patrick Pilet (United Kingdom) Nick Tandy	Porsche 911 RSR	182	+26.058s
4	GTLM	911	(United States) Porsche GT Team	(France) Patrick Pilet (United Kingdom) Nick Tandy	Porsche 4.0 L Flat-6	182	+26.058s
5	GTLM	3	(United States) Corvette Racing	(Spain) Antonio García (Denmark) Jan Magnussen	Chevrolet Corvette C7.R	182	+48.911s
5	GTLM	3	(United States) Corvette Racing	(Spain) Antonio García (Denmark) Jan Magnussen	Chevrolet LT5.5 5.5 L V8	182	+48.911s
6	GTLM	4	(United States) Corvette Racing	(United Kingdom) Oliver Gavin (United States) Tommy Milner	Chevrolet Corvette C7.R	181	+1 lap
6	GTLM	4	(United States) Corvette Racing	(United Kingdom) Oliver Gavin (United States) Tommy Milner	Chevrolet LT5.5 5.5 L V8	181	+1 lap
7	GTLM	25	(United States) BMW Team RLL	(United Kingdom) Tom Blomqvist (United States) Connor De Phillippi	BMW M8 GTE	181	+1 lap
7	GTLM	25	(United States) BMW Team RLL	(United Kingdom) Tom Blomqvist (United States) Connor De Phillippi	BMW S63 4.0 L Twin-turbo V8	181	+1 lap
8	GTLM	24	(United States) BMW Team RLL	(United States) John Edwards (Finland) Jesse Krohn	BMW M8 GTE	180	+2 laps
8	GTLM	24	(United States) BMW Team RLL	(United States) John Edwards (Finland) Jesse Krohn	BMW S63 4.0 L Twin-turbo V8	180	+2 laps
9	**GTD**	**9**	**(Canada) Pfaff Motorsports**	**(Norway) Dennis Olsen (Canada) Zacharie Robichon**	**Porsche 911 GT3 R**	**178**	**+4 laps‡**
9	**GTD**	**9**	**(Canada) Pfaff Motorsports**	**(Norway) Dennis Olsen (Canada) Zacharie Robichon**	Porsche 4.0 L Flat-6	**178**	**+4 laps‡**
10	GTD	86	(United States) Meyer Shank Racing with Curb-Agajanian	(Germany) Mario Farnbacher (United States) Trent Hindman	Acura NSX GT3	178	+4 laps
10	GTD	86	(United States) Meyer Shank Racing with Curb-Agajanian	(Germany) Mario Farnbacher (United States) Trent Hindman	Acura 3.5 L Turbo V6	178	+4 laps
11	GTD	96	(United States) Turner Motorsport	(United States) Bill Auberlen (United States) Robby Foley	BMW M6 GT3	178	+4 laps
11	GTD	96	(United States) Turner Motorsport	(United States) Bill Auberlen (United States) Robby Foley	BMW 4.4 L Turbo V8	178	+4 laps
12	GTD	73	(United States) Park Place Motorsports	(United States) Patrick Long (Germany) Marco Seefried	Porsche 911 GT3 R	178	+4 laps
12	GTD	73	(United States) Park Place Motorsports	(United States) Patrick Long (Germany) Marco Seefried	Porsche 4.0 L Flat-6	178	+4 laps
13	GTD	91	(United States) Wright Motorsports	(Australia) Matt Campbell (United States) Anthony Imperato	Porsche 911 GT3 R	178	+4 laps
13	GTD	91	(United States) Wright Motorsports	(Australia) Matt Campbell (United States) Anthony Imperato	Porsche 4.0 L Flat-6	178	+4 laps
14	GTD	14	(Canada) AIM Vasser Sullivan	(United Kingdom) Jack Hawksworth (United States) Richard Heistand	Lexus RC F GT3	177	+5 laps
14	GTD	14	(Canada) AIM Vasser Sullivan	(United Kingdom) Jack Hawksworth (United States) Richard Heistand	Lexus 5.0 L V8	177	+5 laps
15	GTD	48	(United States) Paul Miller Racing	(United States) Corey Lewis (United States) Bryan Sellers	Lamborghini Huracán GT3 Evo	177	+5 laps
15	GTD	48	(United States) Paul Miller Racing	(United States) Corey Lewis (United States) Bryan Sellers	Lamborghini 5.2 L V10	177	+5 laps
16	GTD	11	(United States) Magnus Racing	(United States) Andy Lally (United States) John Potter	Lamborghini Huracán GT3 Evo	177	+5 laps
16	GTD	11	(United States) Magnus Racing	(United States) Andy Lally (United States) John Potter	Lamborghini 5.2 L V10	177	+5 laps
17	GTD	33	(United States) Mercedes-AMG Team Riley Motorsports	(Netherlands) Jeroen Bleekemolen (United States) Ben Keating	Mercedes-AMG GT3	177	+5 laps
17	GTD	33	(United States) Mercedes-AMG Team Riley Motorsports	(Netherlands) Jeroen Bleekemolen (United States) Ben Keating	Mercedes-AMG M159 6.2 L V8	177	+5 laps
18	GTD	76	(Canada) Compass Racing	(United States) Paul Holton (United States) Matt Plumb	McLaren 720S GT3	175	+7 laps
18	GTD	76	(Canada) Compass Racing	(United States) Paul Holton (United States) Matt Plumb	McLaren M480T 4.0 L Twin-turbo V8	175	+7 laps
19	GTD	63	(United States) Scuderia Corsa	(United States) Cooper MacNeil (Finland) Toni Vilander	Ferrari 488 GT3	174	+8 laps
19	GTD	63	(United States) Scuderia Corsa	(United States) Cooper MacNeil (Finland) Toni Vilander	Ferrari F154 3.9 L Turbo V8	174	+8 laps
20 DNF	GTD	57	(United States) Heinricher Racing w/Meyer Shank Racing	(United Kingdom) Katherine Legge (Denmark) Christina Nielsen	Acura NSX GT3	173	Suspension
20 DNF	GTD	57	(United States) Heinricher Racing w/Meyer Shank Racing	(United Kingdom) Katherine Legge (Denmark) Christina Nielsen	Acura 3.5 L Turbo V6	173	Suspension
21	GTD	12	(Canada) AIM Vasser Sullivan	(United States) Townsend Bell (United States) Frankie Montecalvo	Lexus RC F GT3	159	+22 laps
21	GTD	12	(Canada) AIM Vasser Sullivan	(United States) Townsend Bell (United States) Frankie Montecalvo	Lexus 5.0 L V8	159	+22 laps

== Standings after the race ==
DPi Drivers' Championship standings
Pos.	+/–	Driver	Points
1		(United States) Dane Cameron (Colombia) Juan Pablo Montoya	207
2		(Brazil) Pipo Derani (Brazil) Felipe Nasr	204
3		(Brazil) Hélio Castroneves (United States) Ricky Taylor	198
4		(United Kingdom) Oliver Jarvis (United States) Tristan Nunez	188
5		(United States) Jordan Taylor (Netherlands) Renger van der Zande	188

LMP2 Drivers' Championship standings
Pos.	+/–	Driver	Points
1		(United States) Matt McMurry	165
2		(Canada) Cameron Cassels (United States) Kyle Masson	163
3		(France) Gabriel Aubry	95
4		(United States) Eric Lux	70
5		(United States) Andrew Evans	67

GTLM Drivers' Championship standings
Pos.	+/–	Driver	Points
1		(New Zealand) Earl Bamber (Belgium) Laurens Vanthoor	218
2		(France) Patrick Pilet (United Kingdom) Nick Tandy	210
3		(Spain) Antonio García (Denmark) Jan Magnussen	201
4	2	(Australia) Ryan Briscoe (United Kingdom) Richard Westbrook	195
5		(Germany) Dirk Müller	191

GTD Drivers' Championship standings
Pos.	+/–	Driver	Points
1		(Germany) Mario Farnbacher (United States) Trent Hindman	183
2	1	(United States) Bill Auberlen (United States) Robby Foley	153
3	2	(United States) Patrick Long	151
4	2	(United States) Frankie Montecalvo (United States) Townsend Bell	150
5	1	(United States) Richard Heistand (United Kingdom) Jack Hawksworth	147

- Note: Only the top five positions are included for all sets of standings.

DPi Teams' Championship standings
Pos.	+/–	Team	Points
1		(United States) #6 Acura Team Penske	207
2		(United States) #31 Whelen Engineering Racing	204
3		(United States) #7 Acura Team Penske	198
4		(Germany) #77 Mazda Team Joest	188
5		(United States) #10 Konica Minolta Cadillac	188

LMP2 Teams' Championship standings
Pos.	+/–	Team	Points
1		(United States) #52 PR1/Mathiasen Motorsports	165
2		(United States) #38 Performance Tech Motorsports	163
3		(United States) #18 DragonSpeed	35
4		(United States) #81 DragonSpeed	30

GTLM Teams' Championship standings
Pos.	+/–	Team	Points
1		(United States) #912 Porsche GT Team	218
2		(United States) #911 Porsche GT Team	210
3		(United States) #3 Corvette Racing	201
4	2	(United States) #67 Ford Chip Ganassi Racing	195
5		(United States) #66 Ford Chip Ganassi Racing	191

GTD Teams' Championship standings
Pos.	+/–	Team	Points
1		(United States) #86 Meyer-Shank Racing with Curb Agajanian	183
2	1	(United States) #96 Turner Motorsport	153
3	2	(United States) #73 Park Place Motorsports	151
4	2	(Canada) #12 AIM Vasser Sullivan	150
5	1	(Canada) #14 AIM Vasser Sullivan	147

- Note: Only the top five positions are included for all sets of standings.

DPi Manufacturers' Championship standings
Pos.	+/–	Manufacturer	Points
1		(Japan) Acura	230
2		(United States) Cadillac	227
3		(Japan) Mazda	216
4		(Japan) Nissan	202

GTLM Manufacturers' Championship standings
Pos.	+/–	Manufacturer	Points
1		(Germany) Porsche	237
2	2	(United States) Ford	213
3		(United States) Chevrolet	210
4	2	(Germany) BMW	209
5		(Italy) Ferrari	32

GTD Manufacturers' Championship standings
Pos.	+/–	Manufacturer	Points
1		(Japan) Acura	184
2	1	(Japan) Lexus	177
3	1	(Italy) Lamborghini	176
4	2	(Germany) Porsche	168
5	2	(Germany) BMW	165

- Note: Only the top five positions are included for all sets of standings.

IMSA SportsCar Championship
Previous race: 2019 SportsCar Grand Prix	2019 season	Next race: 2019 Road Race Showcase at Road America
