= Acura ARX-05 =

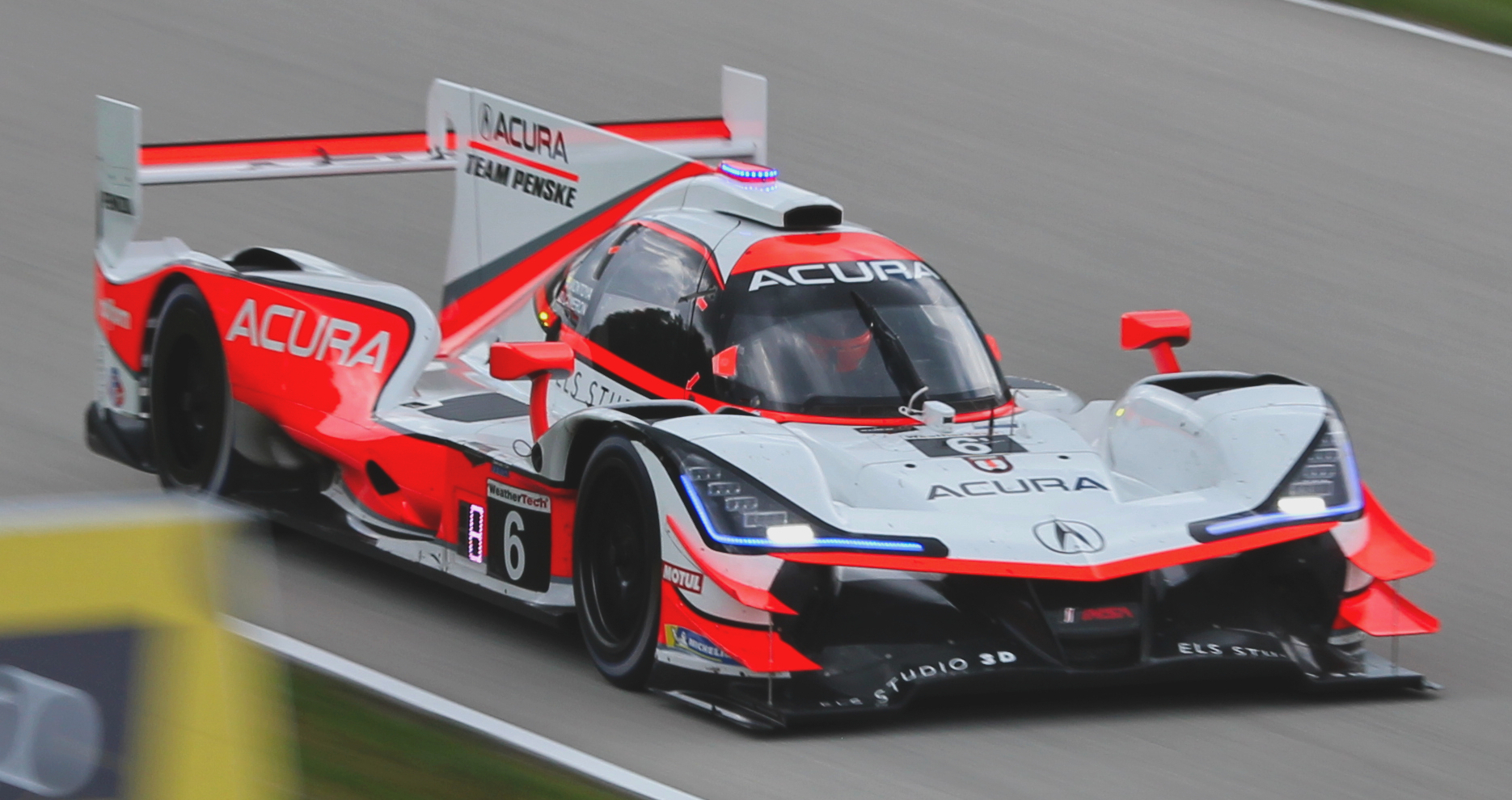
- The No. 6 ARX-05 at the 2020 IMSA SportsCar Weekend
- Category: Daytona Prototype International
- Constructor: HPD (Oreca)
- Designer: Matthew Niles (Project Leader)
- Predecessor: HPD ARX-04b
- Successor: Acura ARX-06

Technical specifications
- Chassis: Carbon fibre monocoque
- Suspension (front): Double wishbone, push rod operated over damper
- Suspension (rear): Double wishbone, push rod operated over damper
- Engine: Acura AR35TT 3.5 L (213.6 cu in) V6 24valve DOHC twin-turbocharged, mid-engined, longitudinally mounted
- Transmission: 6-speed sequential manual
- Power: 600hp (447kw)
- Weight: 2,050 lb (930 kg) including driver
- Fuel: VP Racing Fuels
- Lubricants: Pennzoil
- Tyres: Continental, Michelin

Competition history
- Notable entrants: (United States) Acura Team Penske (United States) Meyer Shank Racing w/ Curb-Agajanian (United States) Wayne Taylor Racing
- Notable drivers: (Colombia) Juan Pablo Montoya (United States) Dane Cameron (Brazil) Hélio Castroneves (United States) Ricky Taylor (United States) Graham Rahal (France) Simon Pagenaud (United States) Alexander Rossi (Portugal) Filipe Albuquerque (France) Olivier Pla (United States) A. J. Allmendinger (United Kingdom) Will Stevens (United Kingdom) Tom Blomqvist (United Kingdom) Oliver Jarvis (Belgium) Stoffel Vandoorne (New Zealand) Brendon Hartley
- Debut: 2018 24 Hours of Daytona
- First win: 2018 Sports Car Challenge of Mid-Ohio
- Last win: 2022 Petit Le Mans
- Last event: 2022 Petit Le Mans
Races	Wins	Podiums	Poles	F/Laps
49	18	47	23	7
- Teams' Championships: 3 (2019 IMSA SCC, 2020 IMSA SCC, 2022 IMSA SCC)
- Constructors' Championships: 3 (2019 IMSA SCC, 2020 IMSA SCC, 2022 IMSA SCC)
- Drivers' Championships: 3 (2019 IMSA SCC, 2020 IMSA SCC, 2022 IMSA SCC)

The Acura ARX-05 is a Daytona Prototype International (DPi) sports prototype racing car developed by Honda Performance Development (HPD) in collaboration with Oreca. The car began use in 2018 and was designed in accordance with DPi regulations debuted by the International Motor Sports Association (IMSA) the year prior, based on the LMP2 chassis by Oreca 07. The ARX-05 first competed in the IMSA Weathertech Sportscar Championship in a factory-backed effort with Team Penske before being raced by customer teams Wayne Taylor Racing and Meyer Shank Racing.

The ARX-05 marked Acura's return to competition in North American prototype racing following previous programs under the HPD name. In its five seasons of competition from 2018 to 2022, the ARX-05 would find consistent success in IMSA competition, being a regular fixture in championship fights and winning a number of races.

With DPi regulations replaced by the Le Mans Daytona h (LMDh) regulations from 2023 onwards, the ARX-05 was retired and replaced by the Acura ARX-06.

== Development ==
=== Background ===
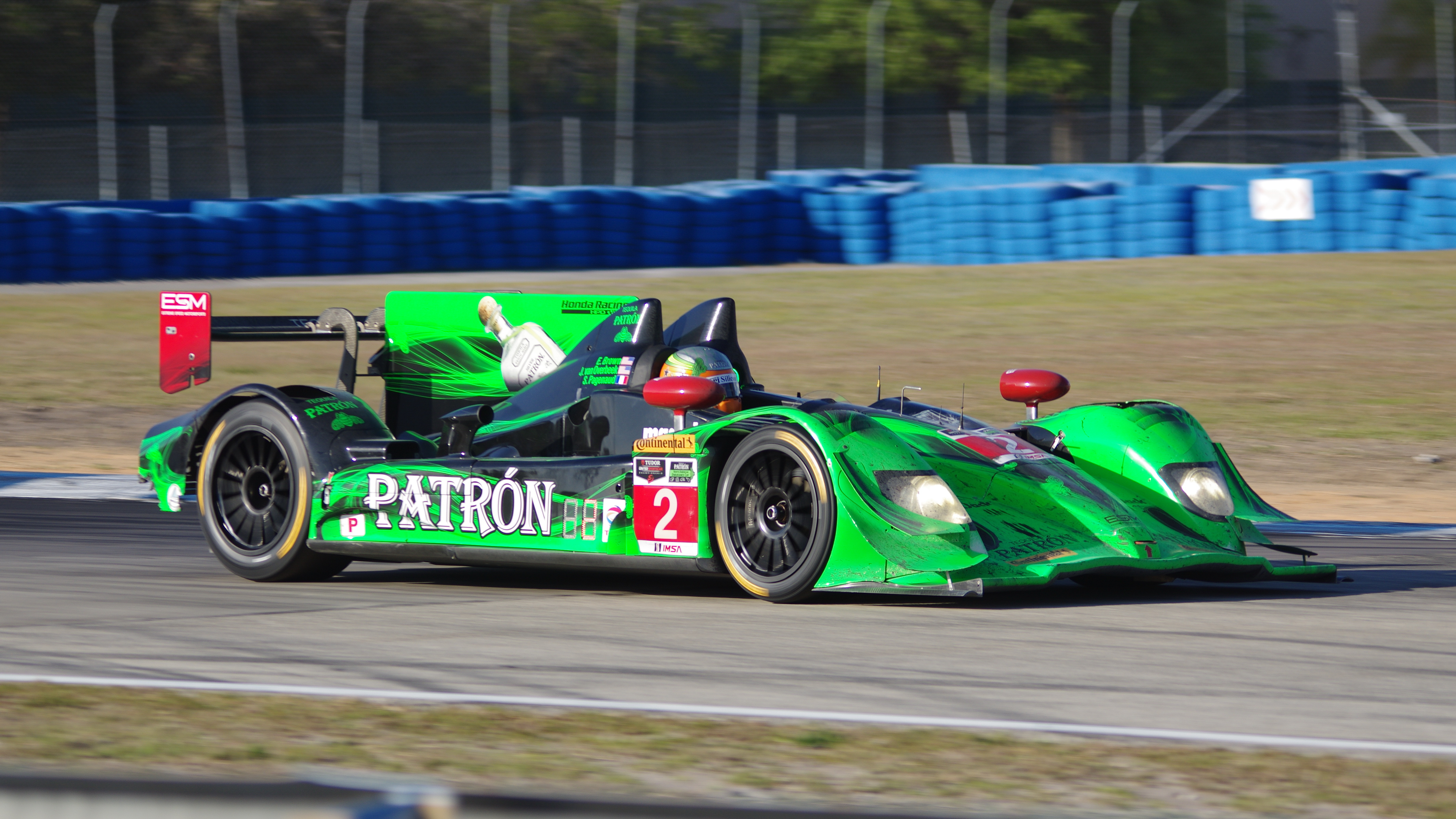
The Extreme Speed HPD ARX-03b at the 2014 12 Hours of Sebring.

Honda Performance Development's previous efforts in IMSA prototype competition had ended under difficult circumstances. In the 2014 season, the ARX-03, a predecessor to the ARX-05, was withdrawn from later races by Extreme Speed Motorsports due to complaints regarding IMSA's balance of performance requirements.

By the 2015 season, with Extreme Speed Motorsports reducing its IMSA campaign to endurance events only, the participation of HPD's newly developed ARX-04b was similarly limited. The ARX-04b proved to be a significant failure, competing only in the 2015 24 Hours of Daytona before being shelved for the older ARX-03, which itself would compete in only one more IMSA race before Extreme Speed Motorsports cancelled the remainder of its 2015 campaign. The ARX-04b would not compete again despite continued development and testing.

Hoping to move on from previous setbacks, Honda began preparations for its next IMSA prototype as new regulations for LMP2 prototypes for 2017 were finalized alongside IMSA's DPi ruleset. HPD conducted multiple interviews with multiple different chassis manufacturers before ultimately reaching an agreement with Oreca to use the Oreca 07 as the basis for the ARX-05, which, for the first time since 2011, would be branded as an Acura. HPD and Acura's design team worked in tandem to develop the car.

Acura's return to IMSA prototype competition was formally announced on July 11, 2017, with HPD having reached an agreement with Team Penske to campaign the car from the 2018 season onwards. The ARX-05 was publicly unveiled at Laguna Seca on August 18, 2017.

=== Specifications and design ===
The ARX-05 is constructed around the Oreca 07's carbon-fiber monocoque chassis. Acura-specific bodywork and exterior styling were developed by Acura Design Studio in California in collaboration with HPD and Oreca engineers. The car incorporates Acura's signature "Jewel Eye" headlight styling from their production cars while retaining the standardized cockpit dimensions and survival cell structure mandated by the new LMP2 regulations for all DPi entries.

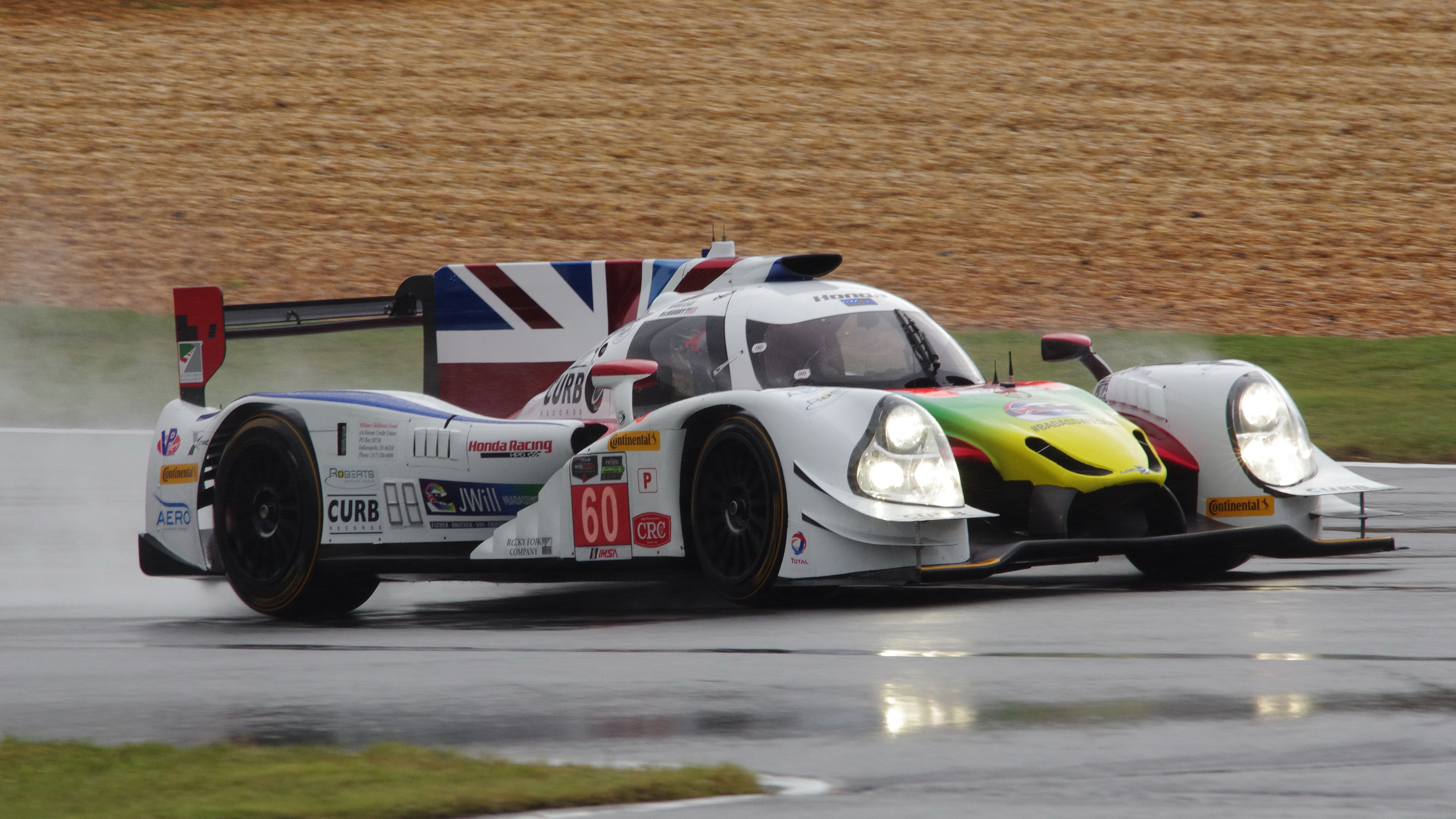
The Ligier JS P2, another prototype powered by the Acura AR35TT.

Power is supplied by the Acura AR35TT, also known as the Honda HR35TT, a twin-turbocharged 3.5-liter V6 engine developed and assembled by HPD. The engine had previously been used in endurance prototypes competing under differing regulations, including the Ligier JS P2 and Riley MkXXVI. The AR35TT's design is derived from Honda's J35 production engine found in multiple road cars. Power output is regulated by IMSA balance of performance adjustments in a rear mid-engine, rear wheel drive layout.

The ARX-05 features a paddle-shifting six-speed sequential gearbox supplied by Xtrac alongside an independent double-wishbone pushrod suspension on all four wheels. Braking is provided by Brembo six-piston brake calipers acting on carbon brake rotors.

=== Testing ===
The initial test run of the ARX-05 was carried out at Circuit Paul Ricard in late July 2017, prior to the car's official public unveiling. Footage of the test was later used in a teaser released by Acura on August 8.

After the car's transport to the United States, its testing efforts were expanded. The ARX-05 completed its first North American test at Road Atlanta on August 25, 2017, with Juan Pablo Montoya driving over the course of two days. The car later completed its first test on the steep banking of Daytona International Speedway on November 3, 2017, a month ahead of IMSA's official test days at the track in December.

== Racing history ==
=== Team Penske (2018–2020) ===
==== 2018 ====
For the ARX-05's debut season in the 2018 IMSA SportsCar Championship, Team Penske campaigned two vehicles: the No. 6, ran by Juan Pablo Montoya and Dane Cameron full-time with Simon Pagenaud in for endurance rounds, and the No. 7, ran by Helio Castroneves and Ricky Taylor full-time with Graham Rahal in for endurance rounds.

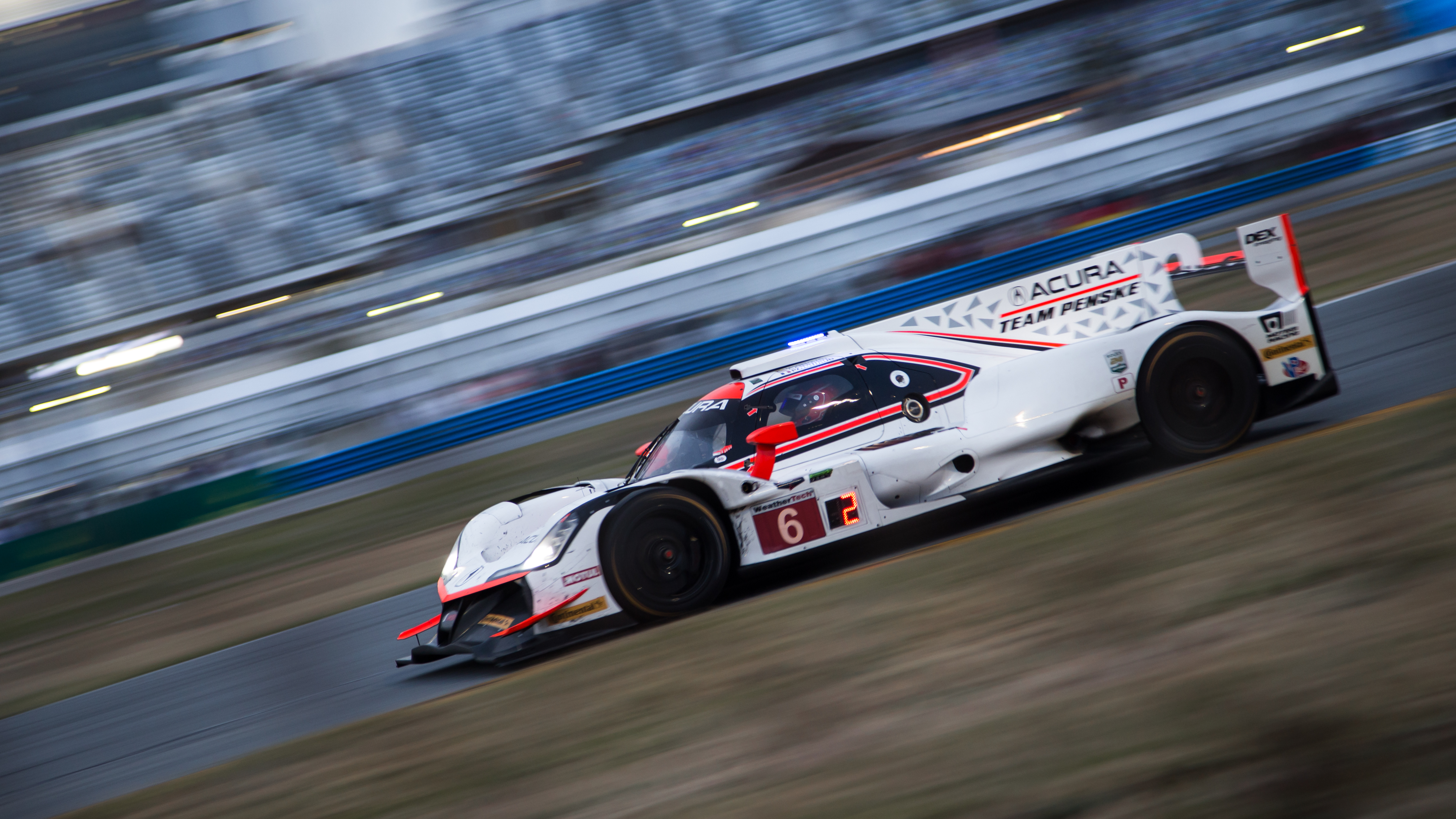
The No. 6 Team Penske Acura ARX-05 at the 2018 24 Hours of Daytona.

Both cars achieved moderate success throughout the season. Mechanical problems and race damage plagued both teams at the 24 Hours of Daytona and 12 Hours of Sebring, preventing consistent results among the Prototype class. Montoya secured the team's first pole position at Long Beach as performance steadily improved. The team made a breakthrough at Mid-Ohio, where the ARX-05 achieved its maiden victory with the No. 7 driven by Castroneves and Taylor leading a 1–2 finish over the No. 6.

After another strong showing at Belle Isle with a double podium, Team Penske struggled to maintain the same level of success for the rest of the season. The No. 6 recorded additional podium finishes but continued to suffer from reliability problems. The No. 7 failed to return to the podium after Belle Isle, stringing together multiple poor results. The team led the most laps at the Petit Le Mans, but drive-through penalty late in the race dropped them to 5th place.

The No. 6 and No. 7 teams finished 5th and 7th in team standings, respectively, with Acura finishing 2nd in manufacturer standings in the ARX-05's debut season.

==== 2019 ====
For the 2019 IMSA SportsCar Championship, Team Penske retained the No. 6 lineup of Juan Pablo Montoya, Dane Cameron, and Simon Pagenaud for the endurance rounds. Alexander Rossi replaced Graham Rahal as the No. 7's third driver for the endurance races, with Rahal returning only for the Petit Le Mans race.

The ARX-05 found greater success in 2019 than its inconsistent debut season. The No. 6 encountered early setbacks at the 2019 24 Hours of Daytona and 12 Hours of Sebring, finishing sixth and ninth respectively. The No. 7, however, achieved a podium at Daytona. A double podium at Long Beach marked a turnaround for Team Penske, with the No. 6 rebounding to a record seven straight podium finishes, including three wins at Mid-Ohio, Belle Isle, and Laguna Seca, respectively. The No. 7 failed to record a victory but stayed in contention for the championship, achieving five podiums with only one finish below 5th. The ARX-05 saw three more double podiums throughout the year.

The No. 6 became the 2019 IMSA champion for team competition and the No. 7 finished in third place. Acura, meanwhile, won their first manufacturer's championship in DPi.

==== 2020 ====
The driver lineups remained mostly unchanged for the 2020 IMSA SportsCar Championship, the only difference being that Alexander Rossi was the only driver for the No. 7's endurance rounds.

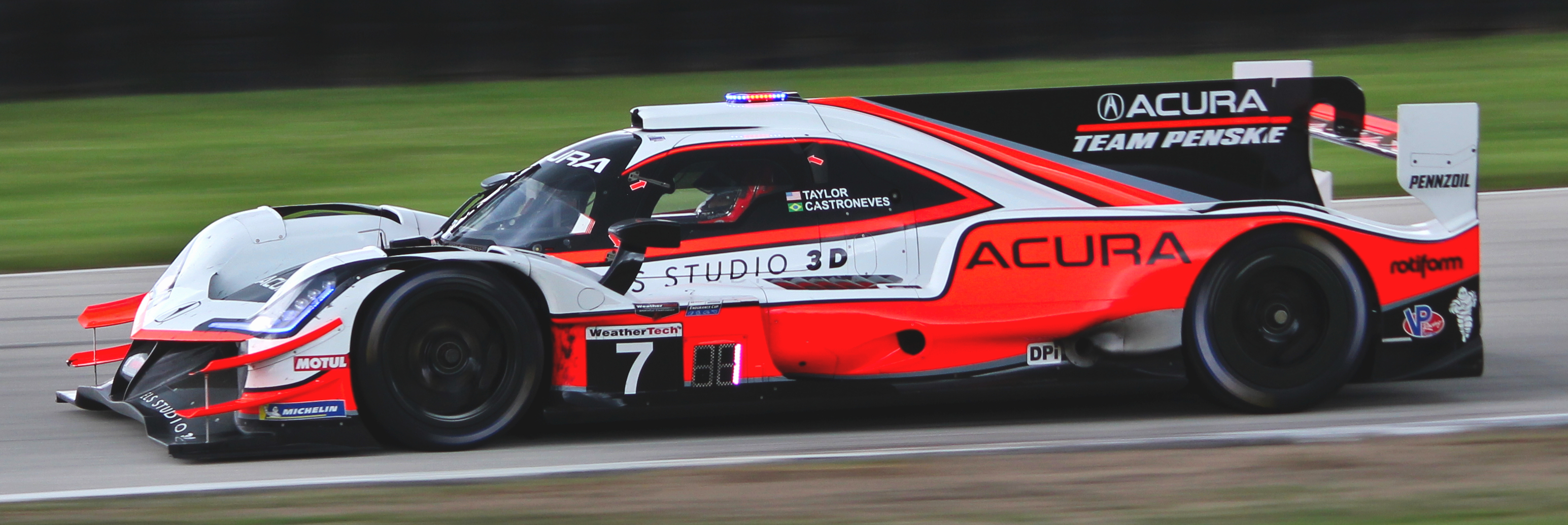
The Team Penske Acura ARX-05 at Road America in 2020.

The two Team Penske entries had greatly varying fortunes throughout 2020. The No. 6 and No. 7 finished 4th and 8th respectively at the 2020 24 Hours of Daytona prior to the season's postponement due to the COVID-19 pandemic. Following IMSA's return to racing at the Weathertech 240, the No. 6 would string together multiple mediocre finishes, rebounding only later in the season to achieve three podiums in the final three races. The No. 7, following poor results at the Weathertech 240 and Sebring, dominated the latter half of the season, winning four out of the last six races.

Acura and Team Penske successfully defended their titles in 2020, with the No. 7 winning the team's championship by one point and Acura narrowly edging out Cadillac to take the manufacturer's championship. The No. 6 only finished 7th in the team's championship due to inconsistent performance.

The 2020 season marked the final campaign of the partnership between Acura and Team Penske after three years of competition. On July 20, 2020, it was announced that they would part ways following the conclusion of the season.

=== Wayne Taylor Racing and Meyer Shank Racing (2021–2022) ===
==== 2021 ====
Beginning with the 2021 IMSA SportsCar Championship, factory support for the ARX-05 was assumed by Wayne Taylor Racing and Meyer Shank Racing. The two teams campaigned vehicles No. 10 and No. 60, respectively.

Despite the shift in team structure, the ARX-05 saw multiple of its previous drivers return to continue racing with the car. Ricky Taylor, Alexander Rossi, and Helio Castroneves reunited as teammates at the 2021 24 Hours of Daytona; Taylor raced the No. 10 full-time, Rossi raced for endurance rounds, and Castroneves drove only for Daytona. Filipe Albuquerque was signed to be the car's second full-time driver. Dane Cameron, Juan Pablo Montoya and Helio Castroneves reunited in the No. 60 at the Petit Le Mans; Cameron raced the car full-time, Montoya raced for endurance rounds, and Castroneves raced at Road Atlanta only. Oliver Pla was the No. 60's second full-time driver, racing every round except Road Atlanta, while A.J. Allmendinger was the third driver at Daytona.

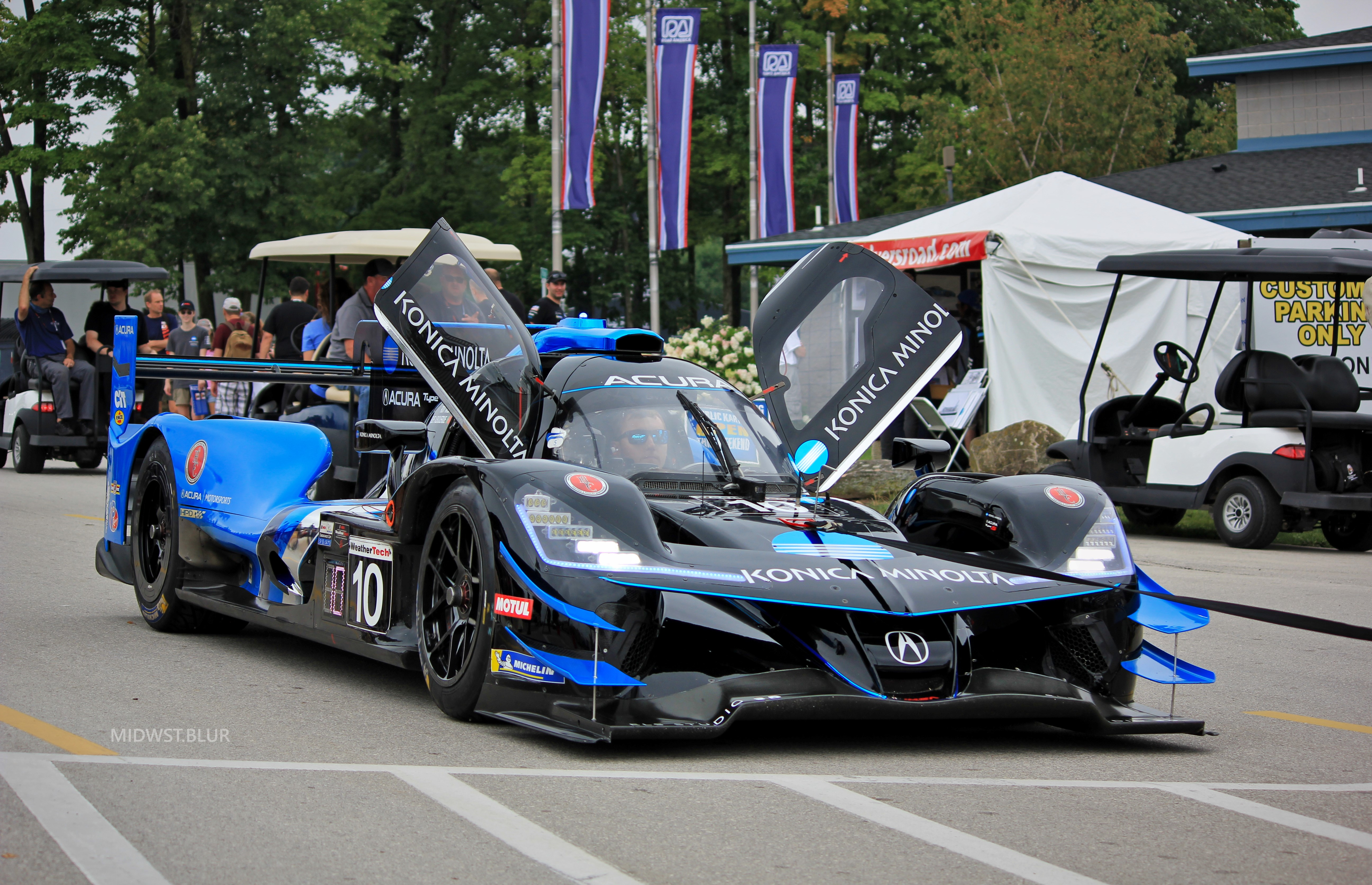
The No. 10 Wayne Taylor Racing Acura ARX-05 at Road America in 2021.

The No. 10 began the season at the 24 Hours of Daytona by achieving the ARX-05's most prestigious victory yet, winning the race by a margin of only 4.704 seconds over No. 48, a Cadillac DPi-V.R campaigned by Action Express Racing. The No. 10 stayed a consistent threat throughout the season, claiming six more podiums, including wins at Mid-Ohio and Laguna Seca. The No. 60 proved less competitive, recording only two podium finishes throughout the season.

The No. 10 narrowly lost out to the No. 31 Action Express Racing Cadillac for the 2021 team's championship, while the No. 60 finished fifth. Likewise, Acura finished 2nd to Cadillac in the manufacturer's championship.

==== 2022 ====
The 2022 IMSA SportsCar Championship marked the final season for the DPi regulations and, therefore, the ARX-05. Wayne Taylor Racing retained Ricky Taylor and Filipe Albuqerque as full-time drivers, while Alexander Rossi returned for the 2022 24 Hours of Daytona. Will Stevens joined the lineup at Daytona and Sebring, while Brendon Hartley competed at Road Atlanta. Meyer Shank Racing introduced a new full-time lineup of Tom Blomqvist and Oliver Jarvis for the No. 60. Helio Castroneves returned for Daytona and Road America, Simon Pagenaud returned at Daytona, and Stoffel Vandoorne filled out the lineup for Sebring.

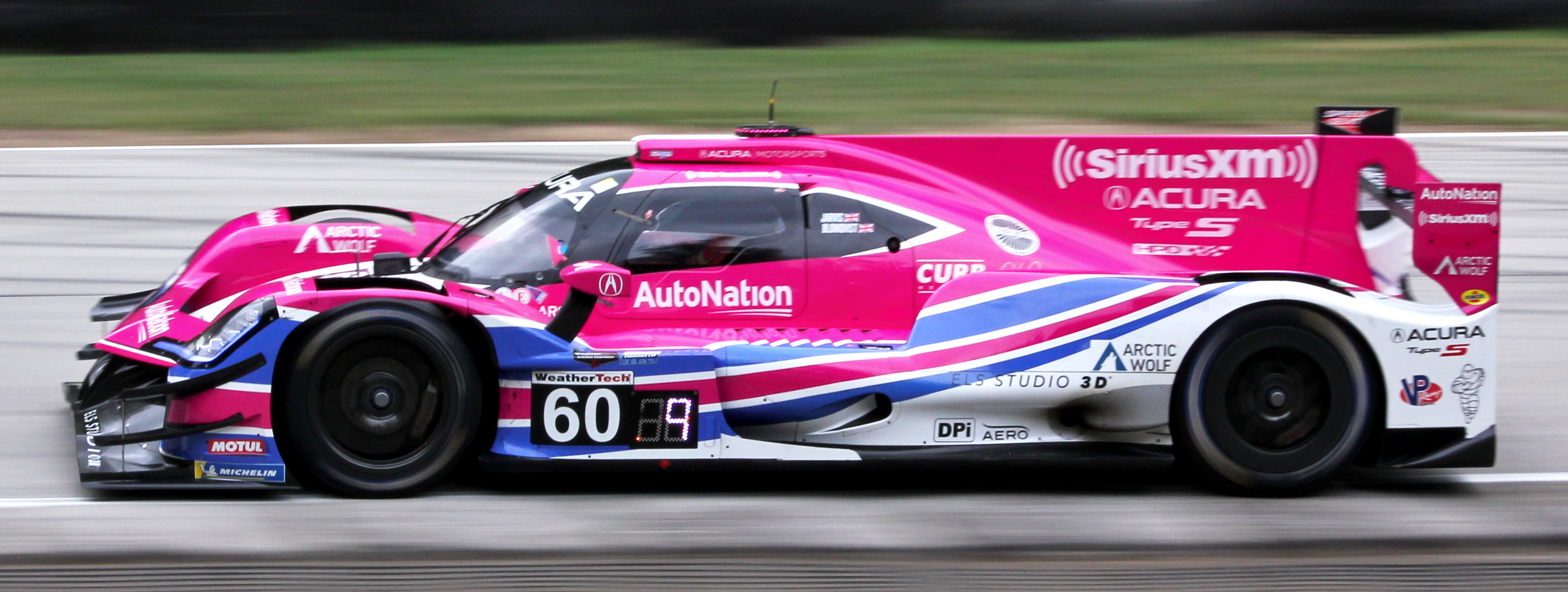
The No. 60 Meyer Shank Racing ARX-05 at Road America in 2022.

The Acura teams remained competitive throughout the season against the rest of the DPi field, which consisted exclusively of Cadillac entries. The No. 60 opened the season with ARX-05's second victory in the 24 Hours of Daytona, topping a double podium with the No. 10. The No. 10 amassed five wins throughout the season at Daytona qualifying, Laguna Seca, Mid-Ohio, Watkins Glen, and Road America, respectively, becoming the team with the most wins during that season of DPi. The No. 60, meanwhile, would not win again until the 2022 Petit Le Mans, but strung together five contiguous second-place finishes.

The No. 60 secured the team's championship despite winning only two races, with its overall consistency proving decisive. The No. 10 finished second in the standings despite claiming the most victories. Both Acura entries finished ahead of every Cadillac in the teams' standings despite being outnumbered. As a result, Acura won the manufacturer's championship once again. This win, their third for the manufacturer's championship for the ARX-05, tied them with Cadillac for the most manufacturer's victories of IMSA's DPi era, in one less season of competition.

== Complete IMSA SportsCar Championship results ==
Results in bold indicate pole position. Results in italics indicate fastest lap.

Year	Entrant	Class	Drivers	No.	Rds.	Rounds											Points	Pos
Year	Entrant	Class	Drivers	No.	Rds.	1	2	3	4	5	6	7	8	9	10	11	Points	Pos
2018	(United States) Acura Team Penske	Daytona Prototype International	(United States) Dane Cameron (Colombia) Juan Pablo Montoya (France) Simon Pagenaud	6	All; All; 1-2, 10	DAY; 10	SEB; 14	**LBH**; **5**	MOH; 2	BEL; 3	WGL; 3	**MOS**; **10**	ELK; 5	LGA; 3	ATL; 13		251	5th
2018	(United States) Acura Team Penske	Daytona Prototype International	(Brazil) Hélio Castroneves (United States) Ricky Taylor (United States) Graham Rahal	7	All; All; 1-2, 10	DAY; 9	SEB; 15	LBH; 6	**MOH**; **1**	BEL; 2	WGL; 12	MOS; 5	ELK; 10	LGA; 10	ATL; 5		243	7th
2019	(United States) Acura Team Penske	Daytona Prototype International	(United States) Dane Cameron (Colombia) Juan Pablo Montoya (France) Simon Pagenaud	6	All; All; 1-2, 10	DAY; 6	**SEB**; **9**	LBH; 3	MOH; 1	**BEL**; **1**	WGL; 3	MOS; 3	**ELK**; **2**	LGA; 1	ATL; 4		302	1st
2019	(United States) Acura Team Penske	Daytona Prototype International	(Brazil) Hélio Castroneves (United States) Ricky Taylor (United States) Alexander Rossi (United States) Graham Rahal	7	All; All; 1-2; 10	DAY; 3	SEB; 4	**LBH**; **2**	MOH; 5	BEL; 3	WGL; 5	MOS; 5	ELK; 7	**LGA**; **2**	ATL; 3		**284**	**3rd**
2020	(United States) Acura Team Penske	Daytona Prototype International	(United States) Dane Cameron (Colombia) Juan Pablo Montoya (France) Simon Pagenaud	6	All; All; 1, 7, 9	DAY1; 4	DAY2; 4	SEB1; 6	ELK; 8	ATL1; 6	**MOH**; **7**	**ATL2**; **3**	**LGA**; **2**	SEB2; 2			247	6th
2020	(United States) Acura Team Penske	Daytona Prototype International	(Brazil) Hélio Castroneves (United States) Ricky Taylor (United States) Alexander Rossi	7	All; All; 1, 7, 9	DAY1; 8	**DAY2**; **8**	SEB1; 7	**ELK**; **1**	**ATL1**; **1**	MOH; 1	ATL2; 2	LGA; 1	**SEB2**; **8**			265	1st
2021	(United States) Konica Minolta Acura	Daytona Prototype International	(Portugal) Filipe Albuquerque (United States) Ricky Taylor (United States) Alexander Rossi (Brazil) Hélio Castroneves	10	All; All; 1-3, 6, 11; 1	DAY1; 5	DAY2; 1	SEB; 4	MOH; 1	BEL; 3	**WGL1**; **3**	**WGL2**; **3**	ELK; 4	**LGA**; **1**	LBH; 4	ATL; 3	3396	2nd
2021	(United States) Meyer Shank Racing with Curb-Agajanian	Daytona Prototype International	(United States) Dane Cameron (France) Olivier Pla (Colombia) Juan Pablo Montoya (United States) A. J. Allmendinger (Brazil) Hélio Castroneves	60	All; 1-10; 1-3; 1-2; 11	DAY1; 4	DAY2; 4	SEB; 3	MOH; 6	BEL; 6	WGL1; 2	WGL2; 6	ELK; 5	LGA; 4	LBH; 6	ATL; 6	2946	5th
2022	(United States) Konica Minolta Acura	Daytona Prototype International	(Portugal) Filipe Albuquerque (United States) Ricky Taylor (United Kingdom) Will Stevens (United States) Alexander Rossi (New Zealand) Brendon Hartley	10	All; All; 1-3; 1; 11	DAY1; 1	DAY2; 2	SEB; 4	LBH; 6	**LGA**; **1**	MOH; 1	BEL; 4	WGL; 1	MOS; 6	**ELK**; **1**	ATL; 6	3346	2nd
2022	(United States) Meyer Shank Racing with Curb-Agajanian	Daytona Prototype International	(United Kingdom) Tom Blomqvist (United Kingdom) Oliver Jarvis (Brazil) Hélio Castroneves (France) Simon Pagenaud (Belgium) Stoffel Vandoorne	60	All; All; 1-2, 11; 1-2; 3	DAY1; 4	DAY2; 1	SEB; 5	LBH; 4	LGA; 2	MOH; 2	BEL; 2	**WGL**; **2**	**MOS**; **2**	ELK; 4	**ATL**; **1**	3432	1st

== See also ==
- Honda Performance Development
- Daytona Prototype International
- Oreca 07
- HPD ARX-03
- Acura ARX-06
