= 2019 Road Race Showcase at Road America =

Ninth round of the 2019 IMSA SportsCar Championship season

Track map of Road America.

The 2019 Road Race Showcase at Road America was a sports car race sanctioned by the International Motor Sports Association (IMSA). The race was held at Road America in Elkhart Lake, Wisconsin on August 4, 2019, as the ninth round of the 2019 WeatherTech SportsCar Championship, and the fifth round of the 2019 WeatherTech Sprint Cup.

== Background ==
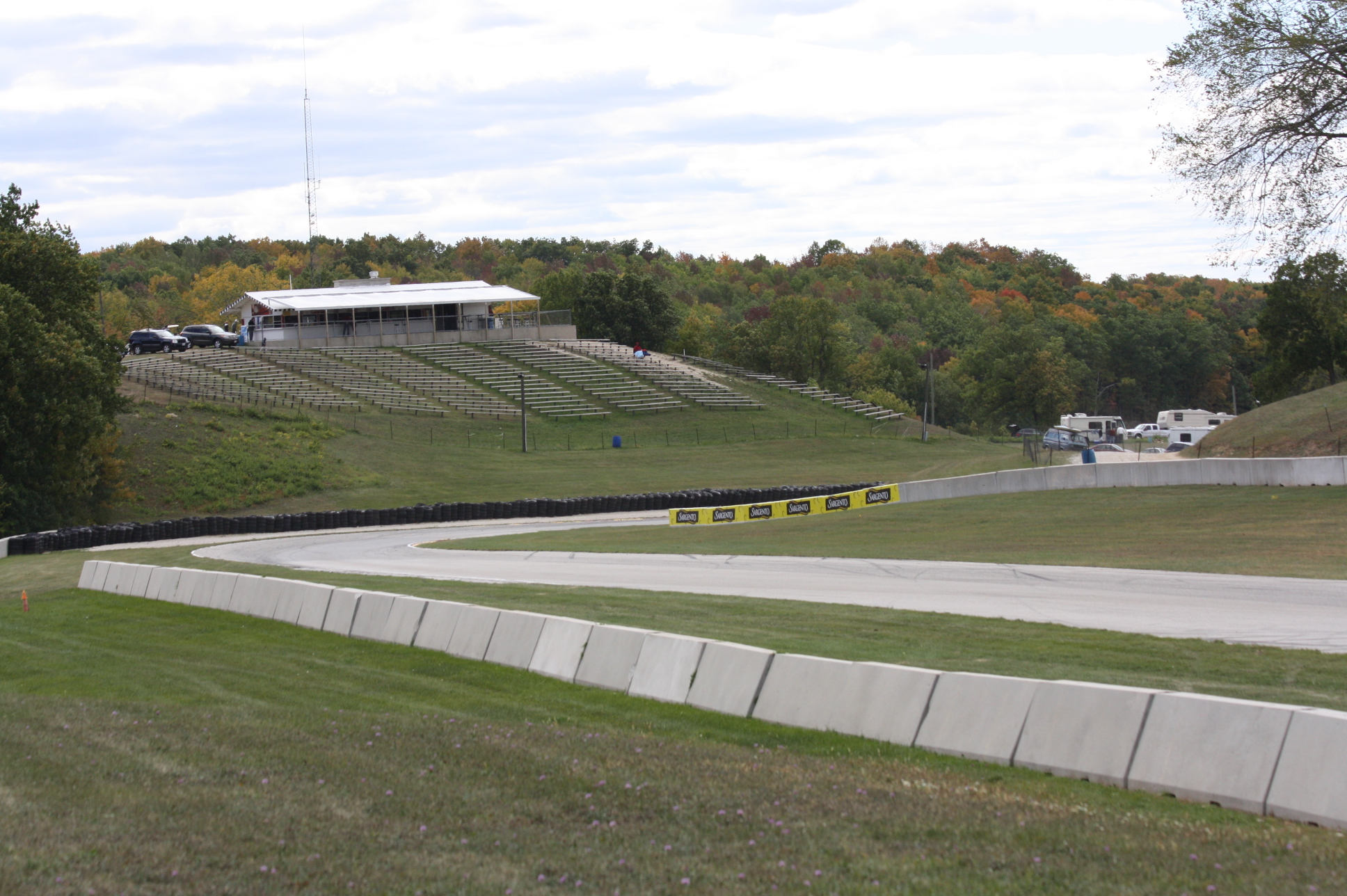
Road America, where the race was held.

International Motor Sports Association's (IMSA) president Scott Atherton confirmed the race was part of the schedule for the 2019 IMSA SportsCar Championship (IMSA SCC) in August 2018. It was the sixth consecutive year the event was held as part of the WeatherTech SportsCar Championship. The 2019 Road Race Showcase at Road America was the ninth of twelve sports car races of 2019 by IMSA, and it was the fifth of seven rounds held as part of the WeatherTech Sprint Cup. The race was held at the fourteen-turn 4.048 mi (6.515 km) Road America in Elkhart Lake, Wisconsin on August 4, 2019.

During this race weekend, IMSA holds their "State of the Series" annual press conference, in which they confirm and announce their future plans for the series they sanction.

On July 24, 2019, IMSA released a technical bulletin regarding the Balance of Performance for the race. The GT Le Mans (GTLM) balance of performance constraints would remain the same as they were in the previous event at Lime Rock Park. In the Daytona Prototype International (DPi) class, after winning the previous two events of the championship, the Mazda RT24-P was hit with a two-liter fuel capacity reduction and a power reduction of 17 horsepower and restriction in higher-RPM turbo boost, as well as being made 20 kilograms heavier. The Cadillac DPi-V.R was also made 20 kilograms heavier, but it received a 0.6 millimeter increase in its restrictor diameter, as well as an increase of 11 horsepower and a fuel capacity increase of one liter. The Acura ARX-05 was made 10 kilograms heavier. In the GT Daytona class (GTD), the constraints of the McLaren 720S GT3 were once again drastically improved, with a 30 kilogram weight reduction and a power increase of eight horsepower, and turbo boost increase. The Ferrari 488 GT3 was given improvements in the same fields, albeit smaller, along with a one liter fuel capacity increase. After winning the 6 Hours of the Glen and finishing 2nd in the previous two championship-scoring rounds, The Acura NSX GT3 was made 20 kilograms heavier.

Before the race, Dane Cameron and Juan Pablo Montoya led the Drivers' Championship with 207 points, ahead of Pipo Derani and Felipe Nasr in second followed by Hélio Castroneves and Ricky Taylor in third with 198 points. In LMP2, Matt McMurry led the Drivers' Championship with 165 points, 2 points ahead of Cameron Cassels and Kyle Masson. Earl Bamber and Laurens Vanthoor led the GTLM Drivers' Championship with 218 points; the duo held an eight-point advantage over Patrick Pilet and Nick Tandy in second. With 183 points, Mario Farnbacher and Trent Hindman led the Drivers' Championship, 30 points ahead of Bill Auberlen and Robby Foley in second followed by Patrick Long in third with 151 points. Acura and Porsche were leading their respective Manufacturers' Championships, while Acura Team Penske, PR1/Mathiasen Motorsports, Porsche GT Team, and Meyer Shank Racing each led their own Teams' Championships.

=== Entries ===
On the same day as the Balance of Performance bulletin, the entry list for the event was released, featuring 35 cars. There were 10 entries in DPi, two in Le Mans Prototype (LMP2), eight cars in GTLM, and 15 cars in GTD. After suffering a heavy crash at the Mobil 1 SportsCar Grand Prix, Cadillac DPi customer team Juncos Racing decided not to take part in the Road America event, for not having built a new chassis in time. They were initially intending to take part in the race. In GTLM, Corvette Racing regular driver Tommy Milner would make his return after being substituted by endurance-only driver Marcel Fässler in the previous two races. In GTD, Starworks Motorsport made their return for Road America, with their regular drivers Ryan Dalziel and Parker Chase after missing the previous two events. Porsche junior drivers Matt Campbell and Dennis Olsen made appearances for Pfaff Motorsports and Wright Motorsports, respectively, after driving for the opposite teams in Lime Rock Park. In GTLM, Corvette Racing regular driver Tommy Milner would make his return after being substituted by endurance-only driver Marcel Fässler in the previous two races.

== Practice ==
There were three practice sessions preceding the start of the race on Saturday, two on Friday and one on Saturday. The first session on Friday morning lasted 75 minutes while the second session on Friday afternoon lasted one hour. The third on Saturday morning lasted one hour.

=== Practice 1 ===
The first practice session took place at 11:15 am CT on Friday and ended with Dane Cameron topping the charts for Acura Team Penske, with a lap time of 1:50.007. Colin Braun was second fastest in the No. 54 Nissan followed by Ricky Taylor's No. 7 Acura in third position. Felipe Nasr in the No. 31 Whelen Engineering Racing Cadillac was fourth fastest and Tristan Vautier's No. 85 JDC-Miller Motorsports Cadillac rounded out the top five. James French set the fastest time in LMP2. The GTLM class was topped by the No. 911 Porsche GT Team Porsche 911 RSR of Nick Tandy with a time of 2:02.147. Oliver Gavin was second fastest in the No. 4 Corvette followed by Tom Blomqvist in the No. 25 BMW Team RLL entry in third. Antonio García in the No. 3 Corvette was fourth fastest and Laurens Vanthoor's No. 912 Porsche rounded out the top five. The GTD class was topped by the No. 33 Mercedes-AMG Team Riley Motorsports Mercedes-AMG GT3 of Jeroen Bleekemolen with a time of 2:06.060. Bryan Sellers was second fastest in the No. 48 Paul Miller Racing Lamborghini followed by Patrick Long's No. 73 Park Place Motorsports Porsche in third position.

Pos.	Class	No.	Team	Driver	Time	Gap
1	DPi	6	Acura Team Penske	Dane Cameron	1:50.007	_
2	DPi	54	CORE Autosport	Colin Braun	1:50.030	+0.023
3	DPi	7	Acura Team Penske	Ricky Taylor	1:50.107	+0.100

=== Practice 2 ===
The second practice session took place at 4:25 PM CT on Friday and ended with Juan Pablo Montoya topping the charts for Acura Team Penske, with a lap time of 1:50.256. Ricky Taylor was second fastest in the sister No. 7 Acura followed by Oliver Jarvis in the No. 77 Mazda Team Joest entry in third. Harry Tincknell in the No. 55 Mazda was fourth fastest and Colin Braun's No. 54 CORE Autosport Nissan rounded out the top five. Matt McMurry set the fastest in LMP2. The GTLM class was topped by the No. 912 Porsche GT Team Porsche 911 RSR of Laurens Vanthoor with a time of 2:02.489. Ryan Briscoe was second fastest in the No. 67 Ford GT followed by teammate Dirk Müller in the sister No. 66 Ford GT in third position. Jan Magnussen in the No. 3 Corvette was fourth fastest and the No. 911 Porsche GT Team entry of Nick Tandy rounded out the top five. The GTD class was topped by the No. 14 AIM Vasser Sullivan Lexus RC F GT3 of Jack Hawksworth with a time of 2:05.162. Corey Lewis in the No. 48 Paul Miller Racing Lamborghini was second fastest followed by Ben Keating's No. 33 Mercedes-AMG in third.

Pos.	Class	No.	Team	Driver	Time	Gap
1	DPi	6	Acura Team Penske	Juan Pablo Montoya	1:50.256	_
2	DPi	7	Acura Team Penske	Ricky Taylor	1:50.284	+0.028
3	DPi	77	Mazda Team Joest	Oliver Jarvis	1:50.531	+0.275

=== Practice 3 ===
The third and final practice session took place at 8:55 am CT Saturday and ended with Dane Cameron topping the charts for Acura Team Penske, with a lap time of 1:49.590. Hélio Castroneves was second fastest in the sister No. 7 Acura followed by Oliver Jarvis in the No. 77 Mazda Team Joest entry in third. Colin Braun in the No. 54 CORE Autosport Nissan was fourth fastest and Jonathan Bomarito's No. 55 Mazda rounded out the top five. Matt McMurry set the fastest in LMP2. The GTLM class was topped by the No. 912 Porsche GT Team Porsche 911 RSR of Laurens Vanthoor with a time of 2:01.644. Jesse Krohn was second fastest in the No. 24 BMW followed by Tom Blomqvist in the sister No. 25 BMW in third. Ryan Briscoe in the No. 67 Ford GT was fourth fastest and Dirk Müller's No. 66 Ford GT rounded out the top five. The GTD class was topped by the No. 33 Mercedes-AMG Team Riley Motorsports Mercedes-AMG GT3 of Ben Keating with a time of 2:05.485. Paul Holton was second fastest in the No. 76 McLaren followed by Robby Foley in the No. 96 BMW in third.

Pos.	Class	No.	Team	Driver	Time	Gap
1	DPi	6	Acura Team Penske	Dane Cameron	1:49.590	_
2	DPi	7	Acura Team Penske	Hélio Castroneves	1:49.783	+0.193
3	DPi	77	Mazda Team Joest	Oliver Jarvis	1:50.269	+0.679

== Qualifying ==
Saturday's early afternoon qualification session was broken into three sessions that were scheduled for 15 minutes each. The first was for cars in the GTD class. Ben Keating qualified on pole for the class driving the No. 33 car for Mercedes-AMG Team Riley Motorsports, beating Corey Lewis in the No. 48 Paul Miller Racing Lamborghini by more than four-tenths of a second. Following in third was Matt Plumb's No. 76 McLaren with the No. 9 Pfaff Motorsports Porsche Zacharie Robichon in fourth. Trent Hindman's No. 86 Acura completed the top five followed by Robby Foley in the No. 96 BMW in sixth. The session ended prematurely due to lightning being near the area.

The second session was for cars in the GTLM class. Tom Blomqvist set the fastest time driving the No. 25 car for BMW Team RLL. However, both BMW Team RLL entries were sent to the back of the GTLM field after both cars failed the post-qualifying technical inspection where it was discovered that the BMWs were found to not have complied with mandated ride height. As a result, Oliver Gavin's No. 4 Corvette was promoted to pole position followed by Richard Westbrook's No. 67 Ford GT in second, and Dirk Müller in the sister No. 66 Ford GT in third position.

The final session of qualifying was for cars in the LMP2 and DPi classes. Dane Cameron qualified on pole overall driving the No. 6 car for Acura Team Penske, beating teammate Hélio Castroneves in sister No. 7 Acura by 0.016 seconds. The two Mazdas were third and fourth (the No. 77 car driven by Jarvis in front of the No. 55 vehicle of Bomarito). Simon Trummer took fifth place in the No. 84 Cadillac. In LMP2, The Performance Tech Motorsports Oreca of James French set the fastest time in the session. McMurry stopped on track with 8 minutes remaining after spinning at turn three and getting stuck in the gravel trap. McMurry was able to restart, but lost his two fastest laps for causing a red flag. Both entries changed their starting driver. As a result, the PR1/ Mathiasen Motorsports car would start the race from pole position.

=== Qualifying results ===
Pole positions in each class are indicated in bold and by ‡.

Pos.	Class	No.	Team	Driver	Time	Gap	Grid
1	**DPi**	**6**	**(United States) Acura Team Penske**	**(United States) Dane Cameron**	**1:48.715**	**_**	1‡
2	DPi	7	(United States) Acura Team Penske	(Brazil) Hélio Castroneves	1:48.731	+0.016	2
3	DPi	77	(Germany) Mazda Team Joest	(United Kingdom) Oliver Jarvis	1:48.949	+0.234	3
4	DPi	55	(Germany) Mazda Team Joest	(United States) Jonathan Bomarito	1:49.381	+0.666	4
5	DPi	84	(United States) JDC-Miller MotorSports	(Switzerland) Simon Trummer	1:49.911	+1.196	5
6	DPi	31	(United States) Whelen Engineering Racing	(Brazil) Pipo Derani	1:50.111	+1.396	6
7	DPi	5	(United States) Mustang Sampling Racing	(Portugal) João Barbosa	1:50.783	+2.068	7
8	DPi	10	(United States) Konica Minolta Cadillac	(Netherlands) Renger van der Zande	1:50.799	+2.084	10^{1}
9	DPi	85	(United States) JDC-Miller MotorSports	(Canada) Misha Goikhberg	1:51.251	+2.536	9
10	DPi	54	(United States) CORE Autosport	(United States) Jon Bennett	1:51.257	+2.542	10
11	LMP2	38	(United States) Performance Tech Motorsports	(United States) James French	1:52.037	+3.322	12^{2}
12	**LMP2**	**52**	**(United States) PR1/ Mathiasen Motorsports**	**(United States) Matt McMurry**	**1:53.321^{3}**	**+4.549**	11^{3}‡
13	GTLM	25	(United States) BMW Team RLL	(United Kingdom) Tom Blomqvist	2:00.344	+11.629	19^{4}
14	**GTLM**	**4**	**(United States) Corvette Racing**	**(United Kingdom) Oliver Gavin**	**2:00.663**	**+11.948**	13‡
15	GTLM	24	(United States) BMW Team RLL	(Finland) Jesse Krohn	2:00.767	+12.052	20^{5}
16	GTLM	67	(United States) Ford Chip Ganassi Racing	(United Kingdom) Richard Westbrook	2:00.835	+12.120	14
17	GTLM	66	(United States) Ford Chip Ganassi Racing	(Germany) Dirk Müller	2:00.922	+12.207	15
18	GTLM	912	(United States) Porsche GT Team	(Belgium) Laurens Vanthoor	2:01.038	+12.323	16
19	GTLM	3	(United States) Corvette Racing	(Denmark) Jan Magnussen	2:01.085	+12.370	17
20	GTLM	911	(United States) Porsche GT Team	(France) Patrick Pilet	2:01.836	+13.121	18
21	**GTD**	**33**	**(United States) Mercedes-AMG Team Riley Motorsports**	**(United States) Ben Keating**	**2:05.250**	**+16.535**	21‡
22	GTD	48	(United States) Paul Miller Racing	(United States) Corey Lewis	2:05.663	+16.948	22
23	GTD	76	(Canada) Compass Racing	(United States) Matt Plumb	2:05.723	+17.008	23
24	GTD	9	(Canada) Pfaff Motorsports	(Canada) Zacharie Robichon	2:05.890	+17.175	24
25	GTD	86	(United States) Meyer Shank Racing with Curb-Agajanian	(United States) Trent Hindman	2:06.028	+17.313	25
26	GTD	96	(United States) Turner Motorsport	(United States) Robby Foley	2:06.105	+17.390	26
27	GTD	14	(Canada) AIM Vasser Sullivan	(United States) Richard Heistand	2:06.425	+17.710	27
28	GTD	57	(United States) Heinricher Racing w/Meyer Shank Racing	(Brazil) Bia Figueiredo	2:06.426	+17.711	28
29	GTD	73	(United States) Park Place Motorsports	(United States) Patrick Lindsey	2:06.432	+17.717	29
30	GTD	91	(United States) Wright Motorsports	(United States) Anthony Imperato	2:06.537	+17.822	30
31	GTD	63	(United States) Scuderia Corsa	(United States) Cooper MacNeil	2:06.886	+18.171	31
32	GTD	44	(United States) Magnus Racing	(United States) John Potter	2:07.509	+18.794	32
33	GTD	8	(United States) Starworks Motorsport	(United States) Parker Chase	2:08.156	+19.441	33
34	GTD	12	(Canada) AIM Vasser Sullivan	(United States) Frankie Montecalvo	2:08.289	+19.289	34
35	GTD	74	(United States) Lone Star Racing	(United States) Gar Robinson	2:08.392	+19.392	35
Sources:

- ^{1} The No. 10 Konica Minolta Cadillac entry was moved to the back of the DPi field after the team elected to change tires after qualifying.
- ^{2} The No. 38 Performance Tech Motorsports entry was moved to the back of the LMP2 field for starting the race with a different driver than who qualified.
- ^{3} The No. 52 PR1/Mathiasen Motorsports entry had its two fastest laps deleted as penalty for causing a red flag during its qualifying session. Additionally, the team started the race with a different driver than who qualified.
- ^{4} The No. 25 BMW Team RLL entry initially qualified on pole position for the GTLM class. However, the car was moved to the rear of the GTLM classification for violating competition rules regarding the car's ride height. Additionally, the team elected to change tires after qualifying.
- ^{5} The No. 24 BMW Team RLL entry initially qualified third position for the GTLM class. However, the car was moved to the rear of the GTLM classification for violating competition rules regarding the car's ride height. Additionally, the team elected to change tires after qualifying.

== Race ==
=== Post-race ===
With a total of 239 points, Cameron and Montoya's second place finish allowed them to extend their advantage to 7 points over Derani and Nasr in the DPi Drivers' Championship. Bomarito advanced from seventh to third. With 200 points, McMurry's victory increased his advantage to 5 points over Cassels. The final results of GTLM meant Bamber and Vanthoor increased their points lead to 14 points over Tandy and Pilet. Briscoe and Westbrook jumped to third after being fourth coming into Road America. The final results of GTD kept Farnbacher and Hindman atop the Drivers' Championship while Robichon advanced from seventh to third. Acura and Porsche continued to top their respective Manufacturers' Championships, while Acura Team Penske, PR1/Mathiasen Motorsports, Porsche GT Team, and Meyer Shank Racing kept their respective advantages in their Teams' Championships with three rounds left in the season.

=== Race results ===
Class winners are denoted in bold and ‡.

Pos	Class	No	Team	Drivers	Chassis	Laps	Time/Retired
Pos	Class	No	Team	Drivers	Engine	Laps	Time/Retired
1	**DPi**	**55**	**(Germany) Mazda Team Joest**	**(United States) Jonathan Bomarito (United Kingdom) Harry Tincknell**	**Mazda RT24-P**	**83**	**2:41:43.115‡**
1	**DPi**	**55**	**(Germany) Mazda Team Joest**	**(United States) Jonathan Bomarito (United Kingdom) Harry Tincknell**	**Mazda MZ-2.0T 2.0 L Turbo I4**	**83**	**2:41:43.115‡**
2	DPi	6	(United States) Acura Team Penske	(United States) Dane Cameron (Colombia) Juan Pablo Montoya	Acura ARX-05	83	+0.227s
2	DPi	6	(United States) Acura Team Penske	(United States) Dane Cameron (Colombia) Juan Pablo Montoya	Acura AR35TT 3.5 L Turbo V6	83	+0.227s
3	DPi	77	(Germany) Mazda Team Joest	(United Kingdom) Oliver Jarvis (United States) Tristan Nunez	Mazda RT24-P	83	+3.114s
3	DPi	77	(Germany) Mazda Team Joest	(United Kingdom) Oliver Jarvis (United States) Tristan Nunez	Mazda MZ-2.0T 2.0 L Turbo I4	83	+3.114s
4	DPi	31	(United States) Whelen Engineering Racing	(Brazil) Pipo Derani (Brazil) Felipe Nasr	Cadillac DPi-V.R	83	+1.16.250s
4	DPi	31	(United States) Whelen Engineering Racing	(Brazil) Pipo Derani (Brazil) Felipe Nasr	Cadillac 5.5 L V8	83	+1.16.250s
5	DPi	10	(United States) Konica Minolta Cadillac	(United States) Jordan Taylor (Netherlands) Renger van der Zande	Cadillac DPi-V.R	83	+1.20.362s
5	DPi	10	(United States) Konica Minolta Cadillac	(United States) Jordan Taylor (Netherlands) Renger van der Zande	Cadillac 5.5 L V8	83	+1.20.362s
6	DPi	5	(United States) Mustang Sampling Racing	(Portugal) Filipe Albuquerque (Portugal) João Barbosa	Cadillac DPi-V.R	83	+1.50.473s
6	DPi	5	(United States) Mustang Sampling Racing	(Portugal) Filipe Albuquerque (Portugal) João Barbosa	Cadillac 5.5 L V8	83	+1.50.473s
7	DPi	7	(United States) Acura Team Penske	(Brazil) Hélio Castroneves (United States) Ricky Taylor	Acura ARX-05	83	+1.55.838s
7	DPi	7	(United States) Acura Team Penske	(Brazil) Hélio Castroneves (United States) Ricky Taylor	Acura AR35TT 3.5 L Turbo V6	83	+1.55.838s
8	DPi	85	(United States) JDC-Miller MotorSports	(Canada) Misha Goikhberg (France) Tristan Vautier	Cadillac DPi-V.R	82	+1 Lap
8	DPi	85	(United States) JDC-Miller MotorSports	(Canada) Misha Goikhberg (France) Tristan Vautier	Cadillac 5.5 L V8	82	+1 Lap
9	DPi	84	(United States) JDC-Miller MotorSports	(South Africa) Stephen Simpson (Switzerland) Simon Trummer	Cadillac DPi-V.R	82	+1 Lap
9	DPi	84	(United States) JDC-Miller MotorSports	(South Africa) Stephen Simpson (Switzerland) Simon Trummer	Cadillac 5.5 L V8	82	+1 Lap
10	**LMP2**	**52**	**(United States) PR1 Mathiasen Motorsports**	**(United States) Patrick Kelly (United States) Matt McMurry**	**Oreca 07**	**79**	**+4 Laps‡**
10	**LMP2**	**52**	**(United States) PR1 Mathiasen Motorsports**	**(United States) Patrick Kelly (United States) Matt McMurry**	**Gibson GK428 4.2 L V8**	**79**	**+4 Laps‡**
11	LMP2	38	(United States) Performance Tech Motorsports	(Canada) Cameron Cassels (United States) James French	Oreca 07	79	+4 Laps
11	LMP2	38	(United States) Performance Tech Motorsports	(Canada) Cameron Cassels (United States) James French	Gibson GK428 4.2 L V8	79	+4 Laps
12	**GTLM**	**67**	**(United States) Ford Chip Ganassi Racing**	**(Australia) Ryan Briscoe (United Kingdom) Richard Westbrook**	**Ford GT**	**77**	**+6 Laps‡**
12	**GTLM**	**67**	**(United States) Ford Chip Ganassi Racing**	**(Australia) Ryan Briscoe (United Kingdom) Richard Westbrook**	**Ford EcoBoost 3.5 L Turbo V6**	**77**	**+6 Laps‡**
13	GTLM	66	(United States) Ford Chip Ganassi Racing	(United States) Joey Hand (Germany) Dirk Müller	Ford GT	77	+6 Laps
13	GTLM	66	(United States) Ford Chip Ganassi Racing	(United States) Joey Hand (Germany) Dirk Müller	Ford EcoBoost 3.5 L Turbo V6	77	+6 Laps
14	GTLM	912	(United States) Porsche GT Team	(New Zealand) Earl Bamber (Belgium) Laurens Vanthoor	Porsche 911 RSR	77	+6 Laps
14	GTLM	912	(United States) Porsche GT Team	(New Zealand) Earl Bamber (Belgium) Laurens Vanthoor	Porsche 4.0 L Flat-6	77	+6 Laps
15	GTLM	3	(United States) Corvette Racing	(Spain) Antonio García (Denmark) Jan Magnussen	Chevrolet Corvette C7.R	77	+6 Laps
15	GTLM	3	(United States) Corvette Racing	(Spain) Antonio García (Denmark) Jan Magnussen	Chevrolet LT5.5 5.5 L V8	77	+6 Laps
16	GTLM	25	(United States) BMW Team RLL	(United Kingdom) Tom Blomqvist (United States) Connor De Phillippi	BMW M8 GTE	77	+6 Laps
16	GTLM	25	(United States) BMW Team RLL	(United Kingdom) Tom Blomqvist (United States) Connor De Phillippi	BMW S63 4.0 L Twin-turbo V8	77	+6 Laps
17	GTLM	4	(United States) Corvette Racing	(United Kingdom) Oliver Gavin (United States) Tommy Milner	Chevrolet Corvette C7.R	76	+7 Laps
17	GTLM	4	(United States) Corvette Racing	(United Kingdom) Oliver Gavin (United States) Tommy Milner	Chevrolet LT5.5 5.5 L V8	76	+7 Laps
18	GTLM	911	(United States) Porsche GT Team	(France) Patrick Pilet (United Kingdom) Nick Tandy	Porsche 911 RSR	76	+7 Laps
18	GTLM	911	(United States) Porsche GT Team	(France) Patrick Pilet (United Kingdom) Nick Tandy	Porsche 4.0 L Flat-6	76	+7 Laps
19	**GTD**	**9**	**(Canada) Pfaff Motorsports**	**(Australia) Matt Campbell (Canada) Zacharie Robichon**	**Porsche 911 GT3 R**	**75**	**+8 laps**
19	**GTD**	**9**	**(Canada) Pfaff Motorsports**	**(Australia) Matt Campbell (Canada) Zacharie Robichon**	**Porsche 4.0 L Flat-6**	**75**	**+8 laps**
20	GTD	48	(United States) Paul Miller Racing	(United States) Corey Lewis (United States) Bryan Sellers	Lamborghini Huracán GT3 Evo	74	+9 laps
20	GTD	48	(United States) Paul Miller Racing	(United States) Corey Lewis (United States) Bryan Sellers	Lamborghini 5.2 L V10	74	+9 laps
21	GTD	96	(United States) Turner Motorsport	(United States) Bill Auberlen (United States) Robby Foley	BMW M6 GT3	74	+9 laps
21	GTD	96	(United States) Turner Motorsport	(United States) Bill Auberlen (United States) Robby Foley	BMW 4.4 L Turbo V8	74	+9 laps
22	GTD	14	(Canada) AIM Vasser Sullivan	(United Kingdom) Jack Hawksworth (United States) Richard Heistand	Lexus RC F GT3	74	+9 laps
22	GTD	14	(Canada) AIM Vasser Sullivan	(United Kingdom) Jack Hawksworth (United States) Richard Heistand	Lexus 5.0 L V8	74	+9 laps
23	GTD	86	(United States) Meyer Shank Racing with Curb-Agajanian	(Germany) Mario Farnbacher (United States) Trent Hindman	Acura NSX GT3	74	+9 laps
23	GTD	86	(United States) Meyer Shank Racing with Curb-Agajanian	(Germany) Mario Farnbacher (United States) Trent Hindman	Acura 3.5 L Turbo V6	74	+9 laps
24	GTD	44	(United States) Magnus Racing	(United States) Andy Lally (United States) John Potter	Lamborghini Huracán GT3 Evo	74	+9 laps
24	GTD	44	(United States) Magnus Racing	(United States) Andy Lally (United States) John Potter	Lamborghini 5.2 L V10	74	+9 laps
25	GTD	63	(United States) Scuderia Corsa	(United States) Cooper MacNeil (Finland) Toni Vilander	Ferrari 488 GT3	74	+9 laps
25	GTD	63	(United States) Scuderia Corsa	(United States) Cooper MacNeil (Finland) Toni Vilander	Ferrari F154 3.9 L Turbo V8	74	+9 laps
26	GTD	91	(United States) Wright Motorsports	(United States) Anthony Imperato (Norway) Dennis Olsen	Porsche 911 GT3 R	74	+9 laps
26	GTD	91	(United States) Wright Motorsports	(United States) Anthony Imperato (Norway) Dennis Olsen	Porsche 4.0 L Flat-6	74	+9 laps
27	GTD	12	(Canada) AIM Vasser Sullivan	(United States) Townsend Bell (United States) Frankie Montecalvo	Lexus RC F GT3	74	+9 laps
27	GTD	12	(Canada) AIM Vasser Sullivan	(United States) Townsend Bell (United States) Frankie Montecalvo	Lexus 5.0 L V8	74	+9 laps
28	GTD	8	(United States) Starworks Motorsport	(United States) Parker Chase (United Kingdom) Ryan Dalziel	Audi R8 LMS GT3	74	+9 laps
28	GTD	8	(United States) Starworks Motorsport	(United States) Parker Chase (United Kingdom) Ryan Dalziel	Audi 5.2 L V10	74	+9 laps
29	GTD	74	(United States) Lone Star Racing	(United States) Lawson Aschenbach (United States) Gar Robinson	Mercedes-AMG GT3	74	+9 laps
29	GTD	74	(United States) Lone Star Racing	(United States) Lawson Aschenbach (United States) Gar Robinson	Mercedes-AMG M159 6.2 L V8	74	+9 laps
30	GTD	76	(Canada) Compass Racing	(United States) Paul Holton (United States) Matt Plumb	McLaren 720S GT3	73	+10 laps
30	GTD	76	(Canada) Compass Racing	(United States) Paul Holton (United States) Matt Plumb	McLaren M480T 4.0 L Twin-turbo V8	73	+10 laps
31	GTD	57	(United States) Heinricher Racing w/Meyer Shank Racing	(United Kingdom) Katherine Legge (Brazil) Bia Figueiredo	Acura NSX GT3	72	+11 laps
31	GTD	57	(United States) Heinricher Racing w/Meyer Shank Racing	(United Kingdom) Katherine Legge (Brazil) Bia Figueiredo	Acura 3.5 L Turbo V6	72	+11 laps
32	GTLM	24	(United States) BMW Team RLL	(United States) John Edwards (Finland) Jesse Krohn	BMW M8 GTE	72	+11 laps
32	GTLM	24	(United States) BMW Team RLL	(United States) John Edwards (Finland) Jesse Krohn	BMW S63 4.0 L Twin-turbo V8	72	+11 laps
33	GTD	33	(United States) Mercedes-AMG Team Riley Motorsports	(Netherlands) Jeroen Bleekemolen (United States) Ben Keating	Mercedes-AMG GT3	68	+15 laps
33	GTD	33	(United States) Mercedes-AMG Team Riley Motorsports	(Netherlands) Jeroen Bleekemolen (United States) Ben Keating	Mercedes-AMG M159 6.2 L V8	68	+15 laps
34 DNF	DPi	54	(United States) CORE Autosport	(United States) Jon Bennett (United States) Colin Braun	Ligier Nissan DPi	66	Gearbox
34 DNF	DPi	54	(United States) CORE Autosport	(United States) Jon Bennett (United States) Colin Braun	Nissan VR38DETT 3.8 L Turbo V6	66	Gearbox
35 DNF	GTD	73	(United States) Park Place Motors	(United States) Patrick Long (United States) Patrick Lindsey	Porsche 911 GT3 R	52	Crash Damage
35 DNF	GTD	73	(United States) Park Place Motors	(United States) Patrick Long (United States) Patrick Lindsey	Porsche 4.0 L Flat-6	52	Crash Damage

== Standings after the race ==
DPi Drivers' Championship standings
Pos.	+/–	Driver	Points
1		(United States) Dane Cameron (Colombia) Juan Pablo Montoya	239
2		(Brazil) Pipo Derani (Brazil) Felipe Nasr	232
3	3	(United States) Jonathan Bomarito	222
4	1	(Brazil) Hélio Castroneves (United States) Ricky Taylor	222
5	1	(United Kingdom) Oliver Jarvis (United States) Tristan Nunez	218

LMP2 Drivers' Championship standings
Pos.	+/–	Driver	Points
1		(United States) Matt McMurry	200
2		(Canada) Cameron Cassels	195
3	1	(United States) Kyle Masson	163
4	1	(France) Gabriel Aubry	95
5	1	(United States) Eric Lux	70

GTLM Drivers' Championship standings
Pos.	+/–	Driver	Points
1		(New Zealand) Earl Bamber (Belgium) Laurens Vanthoor	248
2		(France) Patrick Pilet (United Kingdom) Nick Tandy	234
3	1	(Australia) Ryan Briscoe (United Kingdom) Richard Westbrook	230
4	1	(Spain) Antonio García (Denmark) Jan Magnussen	229
5		(Germany) Dirk Müller	223

GTD Drivers' Championship standings
Pos.	+/–	Driver	Points
1		(Germany) Mario Farnbacher (United States) Trent Hindman	209
2		(United States) Bill Auberlen (United States) Robby Foley	183
3	4	(Canada) Zacharie Robichon	176
4	1	(United States) Richard Heistand (United Kingdom) Jack Hawksworth	175
5	1	(United States) Frankie Montecalvo (United States) Townsend Bell	172

- Note: Only the top five positions are included for all sets of standings.

DPi Teams' Championship standings
Pos.	+/–	Team	Points
1		(United States) #6 Acura Team Penske	239
2		(United States) #31 Whelen Engineering Racing	232
3	3	(Germany) #55 Mazda Team Joest	222
4	1	(United States) #7 Acura Team Penske	222
5	1	(Germany) #77 Mazda Team Joest	218

LMP2 Teams' Championship standings
Pos.	+/–	Team	Points
1		(United States) #52 PR1/Mathiasen Motorsports	200
2		(United States) #38 Performance Tech Motorsports	195
3		(United States) #18 DragonSpeed	35
4		(United States) #81 DragonSpeed	30

GTLM Teams' Championship standings
Pos.	+/–	Team	Points
1		(United States) #912 Porsche GT Team	248
2		(United States) #911 Porsche GT Team	234
3	1	(United States) #67 Ford Chip Ganassi Racing	230
4	1	(United States) #3 Corvette Racing	229
5		(United States) #66 Ford Chip Ganassi Racing	223

GTD Teams' Championship standings
Pos.	+/–	Team	Points
1		(United States) #86 Meyer-Shank Racing with Curb Agajanian	209
2		(United States) #96 Turner Motorsport	183
3	4	(Canada) #9 Pfaff Motorsports	176
4	1	(Canada) #14 AIM Vasser Sullivan	175
5	1	(Canada) #12 AIM Vasser Sullivan	172

- Note: Only the top five positions are included for all sets of standings.

DPi Manufacturers' Championship standings
Pos.	+/–	Manufacturer	Points
1		(Japan) Acura	262
2		(United States) Cadillac	257
3		(Japan) Mazda	251
4		(Japan) Nissan	230

GTLM Manufacturers' Championship standings
Pos.	+/–	Manufacturer	Points
1		(Germany) Porsche	269
2		(United States) Ford	248
3		(United States) Chevrolet	240
4		(Germany) BMW	237
5		(Italy) Ferrari	32

GTD Manufacturers' Championship standings
Pos.	+/–	Manufacturer	Points
1		(Japan) Acura	210
2	1	(Italy) Lamborghini	208
3	1	(Japan) Lexus	205
4		(Germany) Porsche	203
5		(Germany) BMW	195

- Note: Only the top five positions are included for all sets of standings.

IMSA SportsCar Championship
Previous race: 2019 Northeast Grand Prix	2019 season	Next race: 2019 Oak Tree Grand Prix
