= Honda HR35TT engine =

Honda HR35TT engine Acura AR35TT engine

Overview
- Manufacturer: Honda Performance Development
- Production: 2014–

Layout
- Configuration: V6, twin-turbocharged, 60° cylinder angle
- Displacement: 3.5 L (3,471 cc)
- Cylinder bore: 89 mm (3.50 in)
- Piston stroke: 93 mm (3.66 in)
- Cylinder block material: Aluminium
- Cylinder head material: Aluminium
- Valvetrain: 24-valve (four-valves per cylinder), SOHC
- Compression ratio: 11.5:1

Combustion
- Fuel system: Gasoline direct injection
- Management: HPD/McLaren
- Fuel type: VP Racing Fuels E10 100-101 octane gasoline + 10% ethanol
- Oil system: Dry sump
- Cooling system: mechanically water cooled

Output
- Power output: 600 hp (447 kW; 608 PS) @ 8,500 rpm
- Torque output: 500 lb⋅ft (678 N⋅m) @ 6,000 rpm

Chronology
- Predecessor: Honda HR28TT
- Successor: Acura AR24e

The Honda HR35TT engine (also called the Acura AR35TT) is a twin-turbocharged, four-stroke, 3.5-liter, V6 racing engine, designed and produced by Honda Performance Development (HPD) for use in multiple race cars, from 2014.

== Overview ==
The HR35TT, like its predecessor HR28TT, is derived from the production J35 family of engines found in numerous Honda/Acura production vehicles. It features steel crankshaft and rods, dry sump oiling, direct fuel injection and HPD/McLaren engine management. The HR35TT is designed to produce roughly 600 hp (450 kW) at 8,500 rpm and 500 lb⋅ft (680 N⋅m) at 6,000 rpm. The engine made its debut at the 2014 12 Hours of Sebring in a Starworks Motorsport-run Riley MkXXVI. When it was used in the Acura ARX-05, it was dubbed the AR35TT.

== Applications ==
- Acura ARX-05
- Ligier JS P2
- Riley MkXXVI
- Scuderia Cameron Glickenhaus SCG 003
