= 2019 12 Hours of Sebring =

Sports Car Racing

Sebring International Raceway

The 67th Mobil 1 Twelve Hours of Sebring Presented by Advance Auto Parts was an endurance sports car racing event held at Sebring International Raceway near Sebring, Florida, from 14–16 March 2019.

The race was the second round of the 2019 WeatherTech SportsCar Championship, as well as the second round of the Michelin Endurance Cup. Action Express Racing and Wayne Taylor Racing brought home a Cadillac 1-2-3 finish for the overall honours, with the win going to the No. 31 crew of Eric Curran, Felipe Nasr and Pipo Derani, who won the 12 Hour race for a third time in the previous four editions. the #911 Porsche GT Team won in the GTLM class over the No. 66 Ford GT of Chip Ganassi Racing, LMP2 was won by Performance Tech Motorsports, and the Grasser Racing Team took a second straight victory in the GTD class, winning over fellow Lamborghini GTD team Magnus Racing, who came 2nd in only their second start as a Lamborghini team.

== Background ==
The FIA World Endurance Championship returned to the venue for the same weekend for the first time since 2012, albeit with a few changes. The World Endurance Championship had a 1,000-mile standalone event of its own on Friday, March 15, 2019, the day before the official 12 Hours of Sebring sanctioned by IMSA, on March 16. Despite initial questions raised over whether or not two separate events of the same length could be held on the same weekend, the event was confirmed to be the sixth round of the 2018-19 FIA World Endurance Championship. Select drivers and teams, such as Corvette Racing and Chip Ganassi Racing, competed in both events back-to-back.

International Motor Sports Association's (IMSA) president Scott Atherton confirmed the race was part of the schedule for the 2019 IMSA SportsCar Championship (IMSA SCC) in August 2018. It was the sixth consecutive year it was part of the IMSA SCC, and the 67th 12 Hours of Sebring. The 12 Hours of Sebring was the second of twelve scheduled sports car endurance races of 2019 by IMSA, and the second of four races of the Michelin Endurance Cup (MEC). It was held at the 17-turn, 3.741-mile (6.021 km) Sebring International Raceway in Sebring, Florida on March 16, 2019.

On 28 February 2019, IMSA released a technical bulletin regarding the Balance of Performance for the 12-hour race. In the Daytona Prototype international (DPi) class, most cars had reductions in power, with the exception of the Cadillac DPi. The Mazda RT24-P was made 10 kilograms heavier, and had fuel capacity reduction. In the GT Le Mans class (GTLM), the Ferrari 488 GTE was made 15 kilograms lighter. Despite being given a break, Ferrari GTLM team Risi Competizione decided to forgo Sebring, for concerns over the adjustment.

Before the race, Jordan Taylor, Renger van der Zande, Fernando Alonso, and Kamui Kobayashi led the DPi Drivers' Championship with 35 points, ahead of Pipo Derani, Felipe Nasr, and Eric Curran in second position with 32 points. In LMP2, Sebastián Saavedra, Pastor Maldonado, Ryan Cullen, and Roberto González led the Drivers' Championship with 35 points. The GTLM Drivers' Championship was led by Connor De Phillippi, Philipp Eng, Colton Herta, and Augusto Farfus with 35 points, 3 ahead of James Calado, Alessandro Pier Guidi, Miguel Molina, and Davide Rigon in second position. With 35 points, Mirko Bortolotti, Rik Breukers, Rolf Ineichen, and Christian Engelhart led the GTD Drivers' Championship. Cadillac, BMW, and Lamborghini were leading their respective Manufacturers' Championships while Konica Minolta Cadillac, DragonSpeed, BMW Team RLL, and GRT Grasser Racing Team each led their own Teams' Championships.

== Entries ==
A total of 38 cars took part in the event split across 4 classes. There were 11 cars in the DPi class, eight entries in GT Le Mans, 17 in GT Daytona, and a mere two entrants in the LMP2 class. Following the retirement of Christian Fittipaldi, Le Mans winner Brendon Hartley joined the Action Express Racing team in the No. 5 car. Matthieu Vaxivière joined Wayne Taylor Racing in their No. 10 Cadillac, after Toyota Gazoo Racing drivers Kamui Kobayashi and Fernando Alonso were barred from taking part in IMSA's event. In the GT Daytona class, Black Swan Racing, who had confirmed a full endurance-event program for the 2019 IMSA Season, had withdrawn as a result of team owner and driver Tim Pappas sustaining injuries from February's Bathurst 12 Hour event.

== Report ==
=== Thursday practice ===
Due to the World Endurance Championship event taking place on Friday, the first few practice sessions for the 12 Hours of Sebring were held on Thursday. In the first practice session, Felipe Nasr and the No. 31 Action Express Racing Cadillac team were quickest, setting a 1:46.996. They were 0.355 seconds faster than the No. 6 Team Penske Acura. In GT Le Mans, Porsche and Ford were at the top of the leaderboard, with Laurens Vanthoor setting the quickest time for the No. 911 Porsche 911 RSR, setting a 1:56.983. He would be three tenths clear of the times from the Ford GT drivers Richard Westbrook and Joey Hand. In GT Daytona, Mario Farnbacher of the No. 86 Meyer-Shank Racing Acura team set the fastest time of 2:00.793, nearly half a second clear of the No. 73 Park Place Motorsport Porsche, driven by Patrick Long. PR1/Mathiasen Motorsports went fastest in the LMP2 class.

In free practice two, after a low-risk session from Mazda Team Joest, Olivier Pla would give them the fastest time of the weekend so far in the #55 car, a 1:46.834. He would be 0.815 seconds faster than Pipo Derani of the #31 Action Express Racing Cadillac. Acura driver Hélio Castroneves completed the top three in the DPi class. In the GT Le Mans class, Porsche GT Team were fastest once again, with #911 driver Nick Tandy setting a 1:56.991. The team were once again fastest over the two Chip Ganassi Racing Ford GTs. In GT Daytona, Bill Auberlen set the pace in the No. 96 Turner Motorsport BMW M6, with a 2:00.583. PR1/Mathiasen Motorsports once again set the fastest LMP2 time, with 1:52.149.

== Qualifying ==
=== Qualifying results ===
Pole positions in each class are indicated in bold and by ‡.

Pos.	Class	No.	Team	Driver	Time	Gap	Grid
1	**DPi**	**6**	**(United States) Acura Team Penske**	**(United States) Dane Cameron**	**1:45.865**	—	1‡
2	DPi	77	(Germany) Mazda Team Joest	(United States) Tristan Nunez	1:46.011	+0.146	2
3	DPi	7	(United States) Acura Team Penske	(Brazil) Hélio Castroneves	1:46.011	+0.146	3
4	DPi	5	(United States) Mustang Sampling Racing	(Portugal) Filipe Albuquerque	1:46.238	+0.373	4
5	DPi	31	(United States) Whelen Engineering Racing	(Brazil) Pipo Derani	1:46.354	+0.489	5
6	DPi	10	(United States) Konica Minolta Cadillac	(United States) Jordan Taylor	1:46.530	+0.665	6
7	DPi	55	(Germany) Mazda Team Joest	(United States) Jonathan Bomarito	1:46.832	+0.967	7
8	DPi	84	(United States) JDC-Miller Motorsports	(Switzerland) Simon Trummer	1:47.086	+1.221	8
9	DPi	85	(United States) JDC-Miller Motorsports	(France) Tristan Vautier	1:47.275	+1.410	9
10	DPi	50	(Argentina) Juncos Racing	(United States) Will Owen	1:47.478	+1.613	10
11	**LMP2**	**52**	**(United States) PR1/Mathiasen Motorsports**	**(United States) Matt McMurry**	**1:49.728**	**+3.863**	12‡
12	LMP2	38	(United States) Performance Tech Motorsports	(United States) Kyle Masson	1:49.739	+3.874	13
13	DPi	54	(United States) CORE Autosport	(United States) Jon Bennett	1:50.029	+4.164	11
14	**GTLM**	**911**	**(United States) Porsche GT Team**	**(France) Patrick Pilet**	**1:55.899**	**+10.034**	14‡
15	GTLM	912	(United States) Porsche GT Team	(Belgium) Laurens Vanthoor	1:56.042	+10.177	21^{1}
16	GTLM	3	(United States) Corvette Racing	(Spain) Antonio García	1:56.158	+10.293	15
17	GTLM	67	(United States) Ford Chip Ganassi Racing	(United Kingdom) Richard Westbrook	1:56.189	+10.324	16
18	GTLM	4	(United States) Corvette Racing	(United Kingdom) Oliver Gavin	1:56.248	+10.383	17
19	GTLM	24	(United States) BMW Team RLL	(Finland) Jesse Krohn	1:56.486	+10.621	18
20	GTLM	25	(United States) BMW Team RLL	(United Kingdom) Tom Blomqvist	1:56.486	+10.621	19
21	GTLM	66	(United States) Ford Chip Ganassi Racing	(Germany) Dirk Müller	1:56.731	+10.866	20
22	**GTD**	**86**	**(United States) Meyer Shank Racing with Curb-Agajanian**	**(United States) Trent Hindman**	**1:59.917**	**+14.052**	22‡
23	GTD	96	(United States) Turner Motorsport	(United States) Nick Greene	2:00.299	+14.434	23
24	GTD	9	(Canada) Pfaff Motorsports	(Canada) Zacharie Robichon	2:00.504	+14.639	24
25	GTD	11	(Austria) GRT Grasser Racing Team	(Switzerland) Rolf Ineichen	2:00.710	+14.845	25
26	GTD	47	(United States) Precision Performance Motorsports	(United States) Brandon Gdovic	2:00.775	+14.910	26
27	GTD	57	(United States) Heinricher Racing w/Meyer Shank Racing	(Denmark) Christina Nielsen	2:00.809	+14.944	27
28	GTD	63	(United States) Scuderia Corsa	(United States) Cooper MacNeil	2:00.974	+15.109	28
29	GTD	12	(Canada) AIM Vasser Sullivan	(United States) Frankie Montecalvo	2:01.100	+15.235	29
30	GTD	33	(United States) Mercedes-AMG Team Riley Motorsports	(United States) Ben Keating	2:01.184	+15.319	30
31	GTD	29	(Germany) Montaplast by Land-Motorsport	(Canada) Daniel Morad	2:01.189	+15.324	31
32	GTD	8	(United States) Starworks Motorsport	(Argentina) Ezequiel Pérez Companc	2:01.333	+15.468	32
33	GTD	48	(United States) Paul Miller Racing	(United States) Ryan Hardwick	2:01.725	+15.860	33
34	GTD	71	(United States) P1 Motorsports	(Colombia) JC Perez	2:01.961	+16.096	34
35	GTD	73	(United States) Park Place Motorsports	(United States) Nicholas Boulle	2:02.150	+16.285	35
36	GTD	44	(United States) Magnus Racing	(United States) John Potter	2:02.205	+16.340	36
37	GTD	19	(United States) Moorespeed	(United States) Will Hardeman	2:02.534	+16.669	37
38	GTD	14	(Canada) AIM Vasser Sullivan	Disqualified			38
Sources:

1. Car number 912 was moved to the back of the GTLM field after qualifying after Laurens Vanthoor failed to bring the car to scrutineering immediately after the end of the session.

== Post-race ==
The final results of DPi kept Jordan Taylor and Renger van der Zande atop the DPi Drivers' Championship with 67 points while Albuquerque and Barbosa advanced from seventh to fourth. Cassels and Masson's victory allowed them to take the lead of the LMP2 Drivers' Championship while the absent Saavedra, Maldonado, Cullen, and González dropped to fourth. McMurry and Aubry jumped to second after being fourth entering Sebring International Raceway. The final results of GTLM kept Eng atop the Drivers' Championship with 63 points while De Phillippi and Herta dropped to third. Race winners Pilet, Tandy, and Makowiecki advanced from fifth to second. With a total of 70 points, Bortolotti, Breukers, and Ineichen's victory allowed them to extend their advantage over Montecalvo, Bell, and Telitz in the GTD Drivers' Championship to 16 points. Lally, Potter, and Pumpelly advanced from tenth to third. Cadillac and Lamborghini continued to top their respective Manufacturers' Championships while Porsche took the lead of the GTLM Manufactures' Championship. Konica Minolta Cadillac and GRT Grasser Racing Team kept their respective advantages in their respective of Teams' Championships, while Performance Tech Motorsports and Porsche GT Team became the leaders of their respective class Teams' Championships with ten rounds left in the season.

=== Race results ===
Class winners are denoted in bold and ‡.

Pos	Class	No	Team	Drivers	Chassis	laps	Time/retired
Pos	Class	No	Team	Drivers	Engine	laps	Time/retired
1	**DPi**	**31**	**(United States) Whelen Engineering Racing**	**(Brazil) Felipe Nasr (United States) Eric Curran (Brazil) Pipo Derani**	**Cadillac DPi-V.R**	**348**	**12:00:15.925‡**
1	**DPi**	**31**	**(United States) Whelen Engineering Racing**	**(Brazil) Felipe Nasr (United States) Eric Curran (Brazil) Pipo Derani**	**Cadillac 5.5 L V8**	**348**	**12:00:15.925‡**
2	DPi	10	(United States) Konica Minolta Cadillac	(United States) Jordan Taylor (France) Matthieu Vaxivière (Netherlands) Renger van der Zande	Cadillac DPi-V.R	348	+1.030
2	DPi	10	(United States) Konica Minolta Cadillac	(United States) Jordan Taylor (France) Matthieu Vaxivière (Netherlands) Renger van der Zande	Cadillac 5.5 L V8	348	+1.030
3	DPi	5	(United States) Mustang Sampling Racing	(New Zealand) Brendon Hartley (Portugal) Filipe Albuquerque (Portugal) João Barbosa	Cadillac DPi-V.R	348	+4.023
3	DPi	5	(United States) Mustang Sampling Racing	(New Zealand) Brendon Hartley (Portugal) Filipe Albuquerque (Portugal) João Barbosa	Cadillac 5.5 L V8	348	+4.023
4	DPi	7	(United States) Acura Team Penske	(United States) Alexander Rossi (Brazil) Hélio Castroneves (United States) Ricky Taylor	Acura ARX-05	348	+11.331
4	DPi	7	(United States) Acura Team Penske	(United States) Alexander Rossi (Brazil) Hélio Castroneves (United States) Ricky Taylor	Acura AR35TT 3.5 L Turbo V6	348	+11.331
5	DPi	54	(United States) CORE Autosport	(France) Romain Dumas (United States) Jon Bennett (United States) Colin Braun	Nissan DPi	347	+1 Lap
5	DPi	54	(United States) CORE Autosport	(France) Romain Dumas (United States) Jon Bennett (United States) Colin Braun	Nissan VR38DETT 3.8 L Turbo V6	347	+1 Lap
6	DPi	55	(Germany) Mazda Team Joest	(United Kingdom) Harry Tincknell (France) Olivier Pla (United States) Jonathan Bomarito	Mazda RT24-P	346	+2 laps
6	DPi	55	(Germany) Mazda Team Joest	(United Kingdom) Harry Tincknell (France) Olivier Pla (United States) Jonathan Bomarito	Mazda MZ-2.0T 2.0 L Turbo I4	346	+2 laps
7	DPi	85	(United States) JDC-Miller Motorsports	(Colombia) Juan Piedrahita (Canada) Misha Goikhberg (France) Tristan Vautier	Cadillac DPi-V.R	346	+2 laps
7	DPi	85	(United States) JDC-Miller Motorsports	(Colombia) Juan Piedrahita (Canada) Misha Goikhberg (France) Tristan Vautier	Cadillac 5.5 L V8	346	+2 laps
8	DPi	84	(United States) JDC-Miller Motorsports	(Switzerland) Simon Trummer (United States) Chris Miller (South Africa) Stephen Simpson	Cadillac DPi-V.R	345	+3 laps
8	DPi	84	(United States) JDC-Miller Motorsports	(Switzerland) Simon Trummer (United States) Chris Miller (South Africa) Stephen Simpson	Cadillac 5.5 L V8	345	+3 laps
9	DPi	6	(United States) Acura Team Penske	(Colombia) Juan Pablo Montoya (France) Simon Pagenaud (United States) Dane Cameron	Acura ARX-05	339	+9 laps
9	DPi	6	(United States) Acura Team Penske	(Colombia) Juan Pablo Montoya (France) Simon Pagenaud (United States) Dane Cameron	Acura AR35TT 3.5 L Turbo V6	339	+9 laps
10	**GTLM**	**911**	**(United States) Porsche GT Team**	**(United Kingdom) Nick Tandy (France) Patrick Pilet (France) Frédéric Makowiecki**	**Porsche 911 RSR**	**330**	**+18 laps‡**
10	**GTLM**	**911**	**(United States) Porsche GT Team**	**(United Kingdom) Nick Tandy (France) Patrick Pilet (France) Frédéric Makowiecki**	**Porsche 4.0 L flat-6**	**330**	**+18 laps‡**
11	GTLM	66	(United States) Ford Chip Ganassi Racing	(France) Sébastien Bourdais (United States) Joey Hand (Germany) Dirk Müller	Ford GT	330	+18 laps
11	GTLM	66	(United States) Ford Chip Ganassi Racing	(France) Sébastien Bourdais (United States) Joey Hand (Germany) Dirk Müller	Ford EcoBoost 3.5 L Turbo V6	330	+18 laps
12	GTLM	3	(United States) Corvette Racing	(Denmark) Jan Magnussen (Spain) Antonio García (Germany) Mike Rockenfeller	Chevrolet Corvette C7.R	330	+18 laps
12	GTLM	3	(United States) Corvette Racing	(Denmark) Jan Magnussen (Spain) Antonio García (Germany) Mike Rockenfeller	Chevrolet LT5.5 5.5 L V8	330	+18 laps
13	GTLM	24	(United States) BMW Team RLL	(United States) John Edwards (Finland) Jesse Krohn (Austria) Philipp Eng	BMW M8 GTE	330	+18 laps
13	GTLM	24	(United States) BMW Team RLL	(United States) John Edwards (Finland) Jesse Krohn (Austria) Philipp Eng	BMW S63 4.0 L Twin-turbo V8	330	+18 laps
14	GTLM	912	(United States) Porsche GT Team	(France) Mathieu Jaminet (New Zealand) Earl Bamber (Belgium) Laurens Vanthoor	Porsche 911 RSR	330	+18 laps
14	GTLM	912	(United States) Porsche GT Team	(France) Mathieu Jaminet (New Zealand) Earl Bamber (Belgium) Laurens Vanthoor	Porsche 4.0 L Flat-6	330	+18 laps
15	GTLM	67	(United States) Ford Chip Ganassi Racing	(United Kingdom) Richard Westbrook (New Zealand) Scott Dixon (Australia) Ryan Briscoe	Ford GT	330	+18 laps
15	GTLM	67	(United States) Ford Chip Ganassi Racing	(United Kingdom) Richard Westbrook (New Zealand) Scott Dixon (Australia) Ryan Briscoe	Ford EcoBoost 3.5 L Turbo V6	330	+18 laps
16	GTLM	25	(United States) BMW Team RLL	(United States) Colton Herta (United Kingdom) Tom Blomqvist (United States) Connor De Phillippi	BMW M8 GTE	329	+19 laps
16	GTLM	25	(United States) BMW Team RLL	(United States) Colton Herta (United Kingdom) Tom Blomqvist (United States) Connor De Phillippi	BMW S63 4.0 L Twin-turbo V8	329	+19 laps
17	**LMP2**	**38**	**(United States) Performance Tech Motorsports**	**(United States) Kyle Masson (Canada) Cameron Cassels (United States) Andrew Evans**	**Oreca 07**	**322**	**+26 laps‡**
17	**LMP2**	**38**	**(United States) Performance Tech Motorsports**	**(United States) Kyle Masson (Canada) Cameron Cassels (United States) Andrew Evans**	**Gibson GK428 4.2 L V8**	**322**	**+26 laps‡**
18	GTLM	4	(United States) Corvette Racing	(Switzerland) Marcel Fässler (United Kingdom) Oliver Gavin (United States) Tommy Milner	Chevrolet Corvette C7.R	321	+27 laps
18	GTLM	4	(United States) Corvette Racing	(Switzerland) Marcel Fässler (United Kingdom) Oliver Gavin (United States) Tommy Milner	Chevrolet LT5.5 5.5 L V8	321	+27 laps
19	**GTD**	**11**	**(Austria) GRT Grasser Racing Team**	**(Italy) Mirko Bortolotti (Netherlands) Rik Breukers (Switzerland) Rolf Ineichen**	**Lamborghini Huracán GT3 Evo**	**320**	**+28 laps‡**
19	**GTD**	**11**	**(Austria) GRT Grasser Racing Team**	**(Italy) Mirko Bortolotti (Netherlands) Rik Breukers (Switzerland) Rolf Ineichen**	**Lamborghini 5.2 L V10**	**320**	**+28 laps‡**
20	GTD	44	(United States) Magnus Racing	(United States) Spencer Pumpelly (United States) John Potter (United States) Andy Lally	Lamborghini Huracán GT3 Evo	320	+28 laps
20	GTD	44	(United States) Magnus Racing	(United States) Spencer Pumpelly (United States) John Potter (United States) Andy Lally	Lamborghini 5.2 L V10	320	+28 laps
21	GTD	63	(United States) Scuderia Corsa	(Finland) Toni Vilander (United States) Cooper MacNeil (United States) Jeff Westphal	Ferrari 488 GT3	320	+28 laps
21	GTD	63	(United States) Scuderia Corsa	(Finland) Toni Vilander (United States) Cooper MacNeil (United States) Jeff Westphal	Ferrari F154 3.9 L Turbo V8	320	+28 laps
22	GTD	29	(Germany) Montaplast by Land-Motorsport	(Germany) Christopher Mies (Switzerland) Ricardo Feller (Canada) Daniel Morad	Audi R8 LMS GT3	320	+28 laps
22	GTD	29	(Germany) Montaplast by Land-Motorsport	(Germany) Christopher Mies (Switzerland) Ricardo Feller (Canada) Daniel Morad	Audi 5.2 L V10	320	+28 laps
23	GTD	33	(United States) Mercedes-AMG Team Riley Motorsports	(Netherlands) Jeroen Bleekemolen (Brazil) Felipe Fraga (United States) Ben Keating	Mercedes-AMG GT3	320	+28 laps
23	GTD	33	(United States) Mercedes-AMG Team Riley Motorsports	(Netherlands) Jeroen Bleekemolen (Brazil) Felipe Fraga (United States) Ben Keating	Mercedes-AMG M159 6.2 L V8	320	+28 laps
24	GTD	73	(United States) Park Place Motorsports	(United States) Patrick Long (United States) Nicholas Boulle (United States) Patrick Lindsey	Porsche 911 GT3 R	320	+28 laps
24	GTD	73	(United States) Park Place Motorsports	(United States) Patrick Long (United States) Nicholas Boulle (United States) Patrick Lindsey	Porsche 4.0 L Flat-6	320	+28 laps
25	GTD	86	(United States) Meyer Shank Racing with Curb-Agajanian	(Germany) Mario Farnbacher (United States) Trent Hindman (United States) Justin Marks	Acura NSX GT3 Evo	320	+28 laps
25	GTD	86	(United States) Meyer Shank Racing with Curb-Agajanian	(Germany) Mario Farnbacher (United States) Trent Hindman (United States) Justin Marks	Acura 3.5 L Turbo V6	320	+28 laps
26	GTD	57	(United States) Heinricher Racing w/Meyer Shank Racing	(United Kingdom) Katherine Legge (Brazil) Ana Beatriz (Denmark) Christina Nielsen	Acura NSX GT3 Evo	320	+28 laps
26	GTD	57	(United States) Heinricher Racing w/Meyer Shank Racing	(United Kingdom) Katherine Legge (Brazil) Ana Beatriz (Denmark) Christina Nielsen	Acura 3.5 L Turbo V6	320	+28 laps
27	GTD	12	(Canada) AIM Vasser Sullivan	(United States) Townsend Bell (United States) Aaron Telitz (United States) Frankie Montecalvo	Lexus RC F GT3	318	+30 laps
27	GTD	12	(Canada) AIM Vasser Sullivan	(United States) Townsend Bell (United States) Aaron Telitz (United States) Frankie Montecalvo	Lexus 5.0 L V8	318	+30 laps
28	GTD	9	(Canada) Pfaff Motorsports	(Canada) Scott Hargrove (Germany) Lars Kern (Canada) Zacharie Robichon	Porsche 911 GT3 R	318	+30 laps
28	GTD	9	(Canada) Pfaff Motorsports	(Canada) Scott Hargrove (Germany) Lars Kern (Canada) Zacharie Robichon	Porsche 4.0 L Flat-6	318	+30 laps
29	GTD	71	(United States) P1 Motorsports	(Germany) Maximilian Buhk (Germany) Fabian Schiller (Colombia) JC Perez	Mercedes-AMG GT3	315	+33 laps
29	GTD	71	(United States) P1 Motorsports	(Germany) Maximilian Buhk (Germany) Fabian Schiller (Colombia) JC Perez	Mercedes-AMG M159 6.2 L V8	315	+33 laps
30	GTD	47	(United States) Precision Performance Motorsports	(United States) Lawson Aschenbach (United States) Brandon Gdovic (United States) Don Yount	Lamborghini Huracán GT3 Evo	311	+37 laps
30	GTD	47	(United States) Precision Performance Motorsports	(United States) Lawson Aschenbach (United States) Brandon Gdovic (United States) Don Yount	Lamborghini 5.2 L V10	311	+37 laps
31 DNF	GTD	96	(United States) Turner Motorsport	(United States) Bill Auberlen (United States) Nick Greene (United States) Dillon Machavern	BMW M6 GT3	309	Suspension
31 DNF	GTD	96	(United States) Turner Motorsport	(United States) Bill Auberlen (United States) Nick Greene (United States) Dillon Machavern	BMW 4.4 L Turbo V8	309	Suspension
32	LMP2	52	(United States) PR1/ Mathiasen Motorsports	(France) Gabriel Aubry (Denmark) Anders Fjorbach (United States) Matt McMurry	Oreca 07	309	+39 laps
32	LMP2	52	(United States) PR1/ Mathiasen Motorsports	(France) Gabriel Aubry (Denmark) Anders Fjorbach (United States) Matt McMurry	Gibson GK428 4.2 L V8	309	+39 laps
33	DPi	50	(United States) Juncos Racing	(United States) Will Owen (Austria) René Binder (Argentina) Agustín Canapino	Cadillac DPi-V.R	305	+43 laps
33	DPi	50	(United States) Juncos Racing	(United States) Will Owen (Austria) René Binder (Argentina) Agustín Canapino	Cadillac 5.5 L V8	305	+43 laps
34	GTD	8	(United States) Starworks Motorsport	(United Kingdom) Ryan Dalziel (Argentina) Ezequiel Pérez Companc (United States) Parker Chase	Audi R8 LMS GT3	292	+56 laps
34	GTD	8	(United States) Starworks Motorsport	(United Kingdom) Ryan Dalziel (Argentina) Ezequiel Pérez Companc (United States) Parker Chase	Audi 5.2 L V10	292	+56 laps
35 DNF	GTD	14	(Canada) AIM Vasser Sullivan	(United Kingdom) Jack Hawksworth (Switzerland) Philipp Frommenwiler (United States) Richard Heistand	Lexus RC F GT3	262	Crash damage
35 DNF	GTD	14	(Canada) AIM Vasser Sullivan	(United Kingdom) Jack Hawksworth (Switzerland) Philipp Frommenwiler (United States) Richard Heistand	Lexus 5.0 L V8	262	Crash damage
36	GTD	48	(United States) Paul Miller Racing	(United States) Bryan Sellers (United States) Ryan Hardwick (United States) Corey Lewis	Lamborghini Huracán GT3 Evo	249	+99 laps
36	GTD	48	(United States) Paul Miller Racing	(United States) Bryan Sellers (United States) Ryan Hardwick (United States) Corey Lewis	Lamborghini 5.2 L V10	249	+99 laps
37	DPi	77	(Germany) Mazda Team Joest	(United States) Tristan Nunez (Germany) Timo Bernhard (United Kingdom) Oliver Jarvis	Mazda RT24-P	233	+115 laps
37	DPi	77	(Germany) Mazda Team Joest	(United States) Tristan Nunez (Germany) Timo Bernhard (United Kingdom) Oliver Jarvis	Mazda MZ-2.0T 2.0 L Turbo I4	233	+115 laps
38 DNF	GTD	19	(United States) Moorespeed	(Spain) Alex Riberas (United States) Will Hardeman (United States) Andrew Davis	Audi R8 LMS GT3	174	Rear end
38 DNF	GTD	19	(United States) Moorespeed	(Spain) Alex Riberas (United States) Will Hardeman (United States) Andrew Davis	Audi 5.2 L V10	174	Rear end

== Standings after the race ==
DPi Drivers' Championship standings
Pos.	+/–	Driver	Points
1		(United States) Jordan Taylor (Netherlands) Renger van der Zande	67
2		(Brazil) Pipo Derani (Brazil) Felipe Nasr (United States) Eric Curran	67
3		(Brazil) Hélio Castroneves (United States) Ricky Taylor (United States) Alexander Rossi	58
4	3	(Portugal) Filipe Albuquerque (Portugal) João Barbosa	54
5	1	(United States) Colin Braun (United States) Jon Bennett (France) Romain Dumas	54

LMP2 Drivers' Championship standings
Pos.	+/–	Driver	Points
1	1	(Canada) Cameron Cassels (United States) Kyle Masson	67
2	2	(United States) Matt McMurry (France) Gabriel Aubry	60
3	2	(Colombia) Sebastián Saavedra (Venezuela) Pastor Maldonado (Republic of Ireland) Ryan Cullen (Mexico) Roberto González	35
4		(United States) Andrew Evans	35
5	3	(United States) Robert Masson (United States) Kris Wright	32

GTLM Drivers' Championship standings
Pos.	+/–	Driver	Points
1		(Austria) Philipp Eng	63
2	3	(France) Patrick Pilet (United Kingdom) Nick Tandy (France) Frédéric Makowiecki	61
3	2	(United States) Connor De Phillippi (United States) Colton Herta	59
4	3	(Germany) Dirk Müller (United States) Joey Hand (France) Sebastien Bourdais	56
5	2	(New Zealand) Earl Bamber (Belgium) Laurens Vanthoor (France) Mathieu Jaminet	56

GTD Drivers' Championship standings
Pos.	+/–	Driver	Points
1		(Italy) Mirko Bortolotti (Netherlands) Rik Breukers (Switzerland) Rolf Ineichen	70
2		(United States) Frankie Montecalvo (United States) Townsend Bell (United States) Aaron Telitz	54
3	7	(United States) Andy Lally (United States) John Potter (United States) Spencer Pumpelly	53
4		(Germany) Mario Farnbacher (United States) Trent Hindman (United States) Justin Marks	52
5	1	(Netherlands) Jeroen Bleekemolen (United States) Ben Keating (Brazil) Felipe Fraga	51

- Note: Only the top five positions are included for all sets of standings.

DPi Teams' Championship standings
Pos.	+/–	Team	Points
1		(United States) #10 Konica Minolta Cadillac	67
2		(United States) #31 Whelen Engineering Racing	67
3		(United States) #7 Acura Team Penske	58
4	3	(United States) #5 Mustang Sampling Racing	54
5	1	(United States) #54 CORE Autosport	54

LMP2 Teams' Championship standings
Pos.	+/–	Team	Points
1	1	(United States) #38 Performance Tech Motorsports	67
2	2	(United States) #52 PR1/Mathiasen Motorsports	60
3	2	(United States) #18 DragonSpeed	35
4	1	(United States) #81 DragonSpeed	30

GTLM Teams' Championship standings
Pos.	+/–	Team	Points
1	4	(United States) #911 Porsche GT Team	61
2	1	(United States) #25 BMW Team RLL	59
3	4	(United States) #66 Ford Chip Ganassi Racing	56
4	1	(United States) #912 Porsche GT Team	56
5	1	(United States) #3 Corvette Racing	55

GTD Teams' Championship standings
Pos.	+/–	Team	Points
1		(Austria) #11 GRT Grasser Racing Team	70
2		(Canada) #12 AIM Vasser Sullivan	54
3	7	(United States) #44 Magnus Racing	53
4		(United States) #86 Meyer-Shank Racing with Curb Agajanian	52
5	1	(United States) #33 Mercedes-AMG Team Riley Motorsports	51

- Note: Only the top five positions are included for all sets of standings.

DPi Manufacturers' Championship standings
Pos.	+/–	Manufacturer	Points
1		(United States) Cadillac	70
2		(Japan) Acura	64
3		(Japan) Nissan	60
4		(Japan) Mazda	56

GTLM Manufacturers' Championship standings
Pos.	+/–	Manufacturer	Points
1	1	(Germany) Porsche	65
2	1	(Germany) BMW	63
3	1	(United States) Ford	60
4	1	(United States) Chevrolet	56
5	3	(Italy) Ferrari	32

GTD Manufacturers' Championship standings
Pos.	+/–	Manufacturer	Points
1		(Italy) Lamborghini	70
2	1	(Germany) Audi	60
3	1	(Japan) Lexus	56
4	3	(Italy) Ferrari	56
5		(Germany) Mercedes-AMG	54

- Note: Only the top five positions are included for all sets of standings.

WeatherTech SportsCar Championship
Previous race: 24 Hours of Daytona	2019 season	Next race: Grand Prix of Long Beach
