= 2020 IMSA SportsCar Weekend =

Fourth round of the 2020 IMSA SportsCar Championship season

Track map of Road America

The 2020 IMSA SportsCar Weekend was a sports car race sanctioned by the International Motor Sports Association (IMSA). The race was held at Road America in Elkhart Lake, Wisconsin, on August 2, 2020. This race was the fourth round of the 2020 WeatherTech SportsCar Championship, and the third round of the 2020 WeatherTech Sprint Cup.

After a 21-minute weather-induced red flag sandwiched between 22 minutes of full-course caution, the race was won by the #7 team of Hélio Castroneves and Ricky Taylor, while the LMP2 class victory was taken by the DragonSpeed entry of Henrik Hedman and Ben Hanley. The GTLM class was won by Antonio García and Jordan Taylor of Corvette Racing, the team's third consecutive victory. AIM Vasser Sullivan also claimed their third consecutive victory, as Frankie Montecalvo and Townsend Bell scored their first class victory of the season.

== Background ==
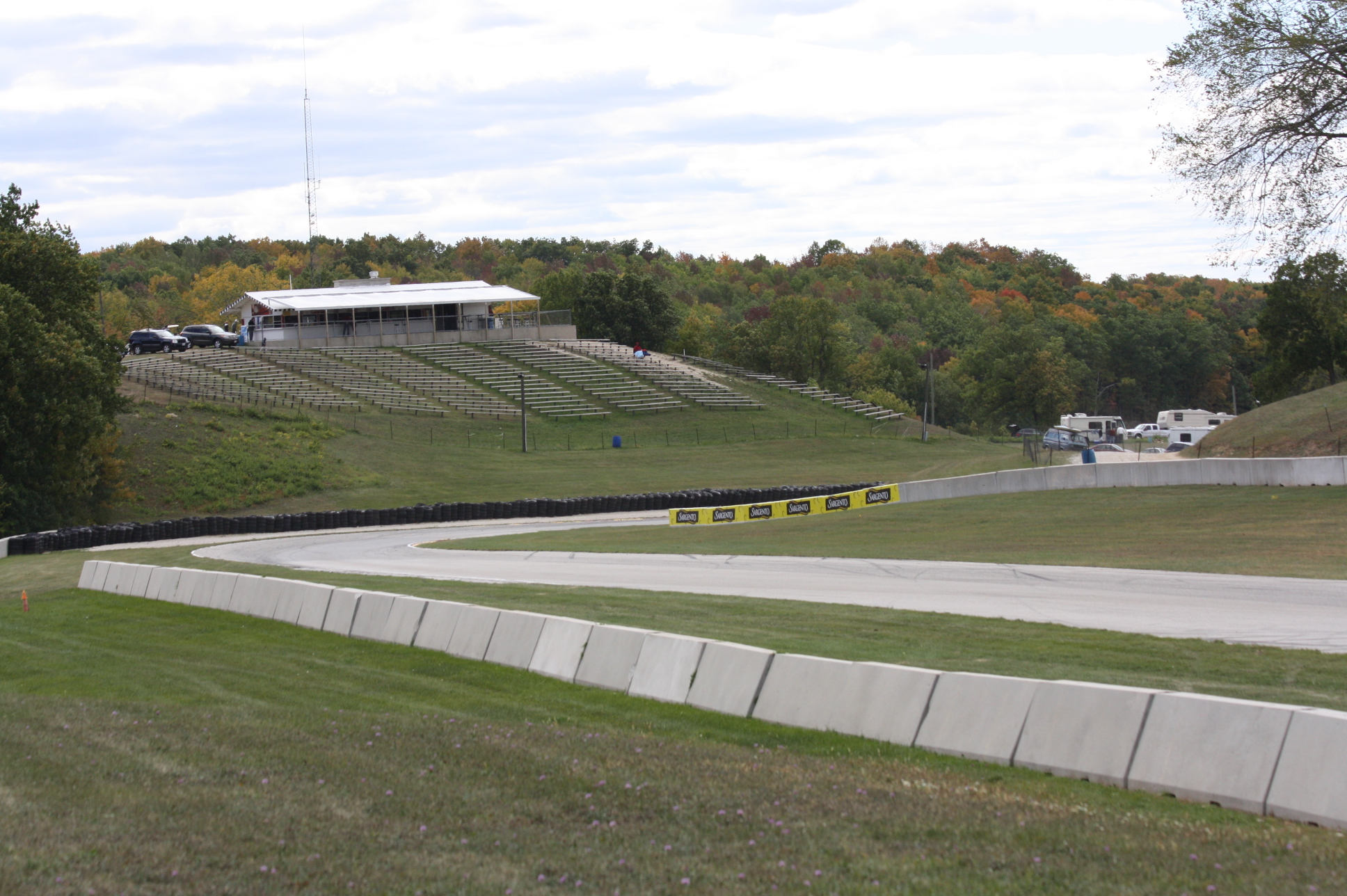
Road America, where the race was held.

Then International Motor Sports Association's (IMSA) president Scott Atherton confirmed the race was part of the schedule for the 2020 IMSA SportsCar Championship (IMSA SCC) in August 2019. It was the seventh consecutive year it was part of the IMSA SCC. The race was held at the fourteen-turn 4.048 mi (6.515 km) Road America on August 2, 2020. The race was the third for the series after returning from the COVID-19 pandemic, and the first besides the Rolex 24 which was included on the series' initial pre-pandemic schedule. It was the third of seven races on the WeatherTech Sprint Cup calendar.

Fans were allowed to be present at the event, but the garage area was restricted to essential team personnel, when it's typically open to fans. The Mazda duo of Jonathan Bomarito and Harry Tincknell entered the race as defending champions.

On July 24, 2020, IMSA released the latest technical bulletin, highlighting the BoP for the race. In DPi, the Acura ARX-05 and Mazda RT24-P received weight reductions, while the Cadillac DPi-V.R and Mazda also received reductions in fuel capacity. The Acura also received a boost increase. In GTLM, the BMW M8 GTE received a slight weight decrease and a horsepower increase, while all cars received a fuel capacity increase. The BMW also received a slight boost increase. In GTD, all cars received a fuel capacity increase, and the Ferrari saw a boost decrease. The Audi and Lamborghini saw minor horsepower increases, while the Ferrari and Lexus received almost equivalent decreases. The restrictor diameter on the Lexus was also reduced, while it was increased on the Audi and Lamborghini.

Before the race, Ryan Briscoe and Renger van der Zande led the DPi Drivers' Championship with 92 points, ahead of Oliver Jarvis and Tristan Nunez with 92 points, and Sébastien Bourdais and João Barbosa with 90 points. With 35 points, Patrick Kelly and Spencer Pigot led the LMP2 Drivers' Championship with 35 points, ahead of Cameron Cassels and Kyle Masson with 32 points. Antonio García and Jordan Taylor led the GTLM Drivers' Championship with 95 points, ahead of Earl Bamber and Laurens Vanthoor with 94 points. In GTD, Jack Hawksworth led the GTD Drivers' Championship with 57 points, ahead of Aaron Telitz with 54 points. Cadillac, Chevrolet, and Lamborghini were leading their respective Manufacturers' Championships, while Konica Minolta Cadillac DPi-V.R, PR1/Mathiasen Motorsports, Corvette Racing, and AIM Vasser Sullivan each led their own Teams' Championships.

=== Entries ===
A total of 31 cars took part in the event, split across four classes. 8 were entered in DPi, 4 in LMP2, 6 in GTLM, and 13 in GTD. In DPi, the only change from the previous event was the return of Chris Miller to the JDC-Miller Motorsports #85 after being replaced by Stephen Simpson at Sebring. Simon Trummer returned in the LMP2 class after being forced to miss the previous round due to travel restrictions. The #8 Tower Motorsport by Starworks car withdrew late in the buildup to the event. GTD saw the largest difference from the previous round, as Meyer Shank Racing returned with their two entries after skipping the Sebring round. Heart of Racing Team also returned for the first time since the season-opening race. GEAR Racing, who had previously announced their intentions to enter the event, were not on the final entry list.

== Practice ==
There were two practice sessions preceding the start of the race on Sunday, one on Friday and one on Saturday. The first session lasted one hour on Friday while the second session on Saturday lasted 75 minutes.

=== Practice 1 ===
The first practice session took place at 4:35 pm CT on Friday and ended with Ricky Taylor topping the charts for Acura Team Penske, with a lap time of 1:50.654. Simon Trummer was fastest in LMP2 with a time of 1:53.381. The GTLM class was topped by the #911 Porsche GT Team Porsche 911 RSR-19 of Nick Tandy with a time of 2:01.492. Laurens Vanthoor in the sister #912 Porsche GT Team entry was second and Jesse Krohn rounded out the top 3. The GTD class was topped by the #96 Turner Motorsport BMW M6 GT3 of Bill Auberlen with a time of 2:06.822.

Pos.	Class	No.	Team	Driver	Time	Gap
1	DPi	7	Acura Team Penske	Ricky Taylor	1:50.654	_
2	DPi	6	Acura Team Penske	Dane Cameron	1:50.929	+0.275
3	DPi	10	Konica Minolta Cadillac	Renger van der Zande	1:50.939	+0.285

=== Practice 2 ===
The second and final practice session took place at 8:55 am CT on Saturday and ended with Dane Cameron topping the charts for Acura Team Penske, with a lap time of 1:49.280. Simon Trummer was fastest in LMP2 with a time of 1:52.618. The GTLM class was topped by the #4 Corvette Racing Chevrolet Corvette C8.R of Oliver Gavin with a time of 2:00.987. Frédéric Makowiecki in the ##911 Porsche GT Team was second and Jordan Taylor rounded out the top 3. The GTD class was topped by the #14 AIM Vasser Sullivan Lexus RC F GT3 of Aaron Telitz with a time of 2:05.691. The session was red flagged when Robby Foley suffered brake failure and crashed at turn 5.

Pos.	Class	No.	Team	Driver	Time	Gap
1	DPi	6	Acura Team Penske	Dane Cameron	1:49.280	_
2	DPi	7	Acura Team Penske	Ricky Taylor	1:49.445	+0.165
3	DPi	77	Mazda Motorsports	Tristan Nunez	1:49.885	+0.605

== Qualifying ==
Saturday's afternoon qualifying was broken into three sessions, with one session for the DPi and LMP2, GTLM, and GTD classes, which lasted for 15 minutes each, and a ten minute interval between the sessions. The rules dictated that all teams nominated a driver to qualify their cars, with the Pro-Am (LMP2/GTD) classes requiring a Bronze/Silver Rated Driver to qualify the car. The competitors' fastest lap times determined the starting order. IMSA then arranged the grid to put DPis ahead of the LMP2, GTLM, and GTD cars.

The first was for cars in GTD class. Aaron Telitz qualified on pole for the class driving the #14 car for AIM Vasser Sullivan, besting Frankie Montecalvo in the sister #12 AIM Vasser Sullivan entry.

The second session of qualifying was for cars in the GTLM class. Laurens Vanthoor qualified on pole driving the #912 car for Porsche GT Team, beating Jordan Taylor in the #3 Corvette Racing entry by more than two tenths of a second.

The final session was for cars in the LMP2 and DPi classes. Ricky Taylor qualified on pole driving the #7 car for Acura Team Penske, beating Dane Cameron in the sister #6 Acura Team Penske entry by over three tenths of a second. Patrick Kelly set the fastest time in LMP2 driving the #52 PR1/Mathiasen Motorsports car.

=== Qualifying results ===
Pole positions in each class are indicated in bold and by ‡.

Pos.	Class	No.	Team	Driver	Time	Gap	Grid
1	**DPi**	**7**	**(United States) Acura Team Penske**	**(United States) Ricky Taylor**	**1:49.061**	**_**	1‡
2	DPi	6	(United States) Acura Team Penske	(United States) Dane Cameron	1:49.379	+0.318	2
3	DPi	55	(Canada) Mazda Motorsports	(United Kingdom) Harry Tincknell	1:49.607	+0.546	3
4	DPi	77	(Canada) Mazda Motorsports	(United States) Tristan Nunez	1:50.120	+1.059	4
5	DPi	10	(United States) Konica Minolta Cadillac	(Australia) Ryan Briscoe	1:50.216	+1.155	5
6	DPi	5	(United States) JDC-Mustang Sampling Racing	(Portugal) João Barbosa	1:50.742	+1.681	6
7	DPi	31	(United States) Whelen Engineering Racing	(Brazil) Felipe Nasr	1:51.391	+2.330	7
8	DPi	85	(United States) JDC-Miller MotorSports	(United States) Chris Miller	1:51.681	+2.620	8
9	**LMP2**	**52**	**(United States) PR1/Mathiasen Motorsports**	**(United States) Patrick Kelly**	**1:54.474**	**+5.413**	9‡
10	LMP2	81	(United States) DragonSpeed USA	(Sweden) Henrik Hedman	1:55.427	+6.366	10
11	LMP2	38	(United States) Performance Tech Motorsports	(Canada) Cameron Cassels	1:56.965	+7.904	11
12	LMP2	18	(United States) Era Motorsport	(United States) Dwight Merriman	1:57.589	+8.528	12
13	**GTLM**	**912**	**(United States) Porsche GT Team**	**(Belgium) Laurens Vanthoor**	**2:00.590**	**+11.529**	13‡
14	GTLM	3	(United States) Corvette Racing	(United States) Jordan Taylor	2:00.854	+11.793	14
15	GTLM	4	(United States) Corvette Racing	(United Kingdom) Oliver Gavin	2:00.904	+11.843	15
16	GTLM	25	(United States) BMW Team RLL	(Canada) Bruno Spengler	2:01.155	+12.904	16
17	GTLM	24	(United States) BMW Team RLL	(Finland) Jesse Krohn	2:01.202	+12.141	17
18	GTLM	911	(United States) Porsche GT Team	(France) Frédéric Makowiecki	2:01.305	+12.244	18
19	**GTD**	**14**	**(Canada) AIM Vasser Sullivan**	**(United States) Aaron Telitz**	**2:06.251**	**+17.190**	19‡
20	GTD	12	(Canada) AIM Vasser Sullivan	(United States) Frankie Montecalvo	2:07.038	+17.977	20
21	GTD	76	(United States) Compass Racing	(United States) Corey Fergus	2:07.265	+18.204	21
22	GTD	96	(United States) Turner Motorsport	(United States) Robby Foley	2:07.361	+18.300	22
23	GTD	74	(United States) Riley Motorsports	(United States) Gar Robinson	2:07.911	+18.850	23
24	GTD	63	(United States) Scuderia Corsa	(United States) Cooper MacNeil	2:07.924	+18.863	24
25	GTD	86	(United States) Meyer Shank Racing with Curb-Agajanian	(United States) Matt McMurry	2:07.942	+18.881	25
26	GTD	57	(United States) Heinricher Racing with MSR Curb-Agajanian	(Canada) Misha Goikhberg	2:08.118	+19.057	26
27	GTD	16	(United States) Wright Motorsports	(United States) Ryan Hardwick	2:08.269	+19.208	27
28	GTD	22	(United States) Gradient Racing	(United Kingdom) Till Bechtolsheimer	2:08.520	+19.459	28
29	GTD	23	(United States) Heart of Racing Team	(United Kingdom) Ian James	2:08.540	+19.479	31^{1}
30	GTD	44	(United States) GRT Magnus	(United States) John Potter	2:09.822	+20.761	29
31	GTD	30	(United States) Team Hardpoint	(United States) Rob Ferriol	2:10.474	+21.413	30
Sources:

- ^{1} The No. 23 Heart of Racing Team entry was moved to the back of the GTD field as per Article 40.1.4 of the Sporting regulations (Change of starting tires).

== Race ==
=== Post-race ===
The result kept Briscoe and van der Zande atop the DPi Drivers' Championship. Bourdais and Barbosa advanced from third to second while Jarvis and Nunez dropped from second to third. Derani moved to fourth after being fifth coming into Road America. In LMP2, Cassels took the lead of the Drivers' Championship while Hedman advanced from fifth to third. Pigot dropped from first to fifth. With a total of 130 points, Antonio García and Jordan Taylor's victory allowed them to extend their advantage over Bamber and Vanthoor in the GTLM Drivers' Championship to ten points. The result kept Hawksworth atop the GTD Drivers' Championship with 87 points. Bell and Montecalvo advanced from sixth to second while Farnbacher and McMurry jumped from eighth to fourth. Cadillac and Chevrolet continued to top their respective Manufacturers' Championships while Lexus took the lead of the GTD Manufactures' Championship. Konica Minolta Cadillac DPi-V.R, Corvette Racing, and AIM Vasser Sullivan kept their respective advantages in their respective of Teams' Championships while Performance Tech Motorsports took the lead of the LMP2 Teams' Championship with seven rounds remaining.

=== Results ===
Class winners are denoted in bold and ‡.

Pos	Class	No.	Team	Drivers	Chassis	Laps	Time/retired
Pos	Class	No.	Team	Drivers	Engine	Laps	Time/retired
1	**DPi**	**7**	**(United States) Acura Team Penske**	**(Brazil) Hélio Castroneves (United States) Ricky Taylor**	**Acura ARX-05**	**63**	**2:43:13.909‡**
1	**DPi**	**7**	**(United States) Acura Team Penske**	**(Brazil) Hélio Castroneves (United States) Ricky Taylor**	**Acura AR35TT 3.5L Turbo V6**	**63**	**2:43:13.909‡**
2	DPi	10	(United States) Konica Minolta Cadillac	(Australia) Ryan Briscoe (Netherlands) Renger van der Zande	Cadillac DPi-V.R	63	+0.383
2	DPi	10	(United States) Konica Minolta Cadillac	(Australia) Ryan Briscoe (Netherlands) Renger van der Zande	Cadillac 5.5L V8	63	+0.383
3	DPi	31	(United States) Whelen Engineering Racing	(Brazil) Pipo Derani (Brazil) Felipe Nasr	Cadillac DPi-V.R	63	+4.131
3	DPi	31	(United States) Whelen Engineering Racing	(Brazil) Pipo Derani (Brazil) Felipe Nasr	Cadillac 5.5L V8	63	+4.131
4	DPi	5	(United States) Mustang Sampling Racing / JDC-Miller Motorsports	(Portugal) João Barbosa (France) Sébastien Bourdais	Cadillac DPi-V.R	63	+36.994
4	DPi	5	(United States) Mustang Sampling Racing / JDC-Miller Motorsports	(Portugal) João Barbosa (France) Sébastien Bourdais	Cadillac 5.5L V8	63	+36.994
5	DPi	55	(Canada) Mazda Motorsports	(United States) Jonathan Bomarito (United Kingdom) Harry Tincknell	Mazda RT24-P	63	+40.192
5	DPi	55	(Canada) Mazda Motorsports	(United States) Jonathan Bomarito (United Kingdom) Harry Tincknell	Mazda MZ-2.0T 2.0L Turbo I4	63	+40.192
6	DPi	77	(Canada) Mazda Motorsports	(United Kingdom) Oliver Jarvis (United States) Tristan Nunez	Mazda RT24-P	63	+4:04.486
6	DPi	77	(Canada) Mazda Motorsports	(United Kingdom) Oliver Jarvis (United States) Tristan Nunez	Mazda MZ-2.0T 2.0L Turbo I4	63	+4:04.486
7	DPi	85	(United States) JDC-Miller MotorSports	(United States) Chris Miller (France) Tristan Vautier	Cadillac DPi-V.R	62	+1 Lap
7	DPi	85	(United States) JDC-Miller MotorSports	(United States) Chris Miller (France) Tristan Vautier	Cadillac 5.5L V8	62	+1 Lap
8	**LMP2**	**81**	**(United States) DragonSpeed USA**	**(United Kingdom) Ben Hanley (Sweden) Henrik Hedman**	**Oreca 07**	**61**	**+2 Laps‡**
8	**LMP2**	**81**	**(United States) DragonSpeed USA**	**(United Kingdom) Ben Hanley (Sweden) Henrik Hedman**	**Gibson GK428 4.2 L V8**	**61**	**+2 Laps‡**
9	DPi	6	(United States) Acura Team Penske	(United States) Dane Cameron (Colombia) Juan Pablo Montoya	Acura ARX-05	61	+2 Laps
9	DPi	6	(United States) Acura Team Penske	(United States) Dane Cameron (Colombia) Juan Pablo Montoya	Acura AR35TT 3.5L Turbo V6	61	+2 Laps
10	**GTLM**	**3**	**(United States) Corvette Racing**	**(Spain) Antonio García (United States) Jordan Taylor**	**Chevrolet Corvette C8.R**	**60**	**+3 Laps‡**
10	**GTLM**	**3**	**(United States) Corvette Racing**	**(Spain) Antonio García (United States) Jordan Taylor**	**Chevrolet 5.5L V8**	**60**	**+3 Laps‡**
11	GTLM	4	(United States) Corvette Racing	(United Kingdom) Oliver Gavin (United States) Tommy Milner	Chevrolet Corvette C8.R	60	+3 Laps
11	GTLM	4	(United States) Corvette Racing	(United Kingdom) Oliver Gavin (United States) Tommy Milner	Chevrolet 5.5L V8	60	+3 Laps
12	LMP2	38	(United States) Performance Tech Motorsports	(Canada) Cameron Cassels (United States) James French	Oreca 07	60	+3 Laps
12	LMP2	38	(United States) Performance Tech Motorsports	(Canada) Cameron Cassels (United States) James French	Gibson GK428 4.2 L V8	60	+3 Laps
13	LMP2	18	(United States) Era Motorsport	(United States) Dwight Merriman (United Kingdom) Kyle Tilley	Oreca 07	60	+3 Laps
13	LMP2	18	(United States) Era Motorsport	(United States) Dwight Merriman (United Kingdom) Kyle Tilley	Gibson GK428 4.2 L V8	60	+3 Laps
14	GTLM	24	(United States) BMW Team RLL	(United States) John Edwards (Finland) Jesse Krohn	BMW M8 GTE	60	+3 Laps
14	GTLM	24	(United States) BMW Team RLL	(United States) John Edwards (Finland) Jesse Krohn	BMW S63 4.0L Turbo V8	60	+3 Laps
15	GTLM	911	(United States) Porsche GT Team	(France) Frédéric Makowiecki (United Kingdom) Nick Tandy	Porsche 911 RSR-19	58	Did not finish
15	GTLM	911	(United States) Porsche GT Team	(France) Frédéric Makowiecki (United Kingdom) Nick Tandy	Porsche 4.2L Flat-6	58	Did not finish
16	GTLM	912	(United States) Porsche GT Team	(New Zealand) Earl Bamber (Belgium) Laurens Vanthoor	Porsche 911 RSR-19	58	+5 Laps
16	GTLM	912	(United States) Porsche GT Team	(New Zealand) Earl Bamber (Belgium) Laurens Vanthoor	Porsche 4.2L Flat-6	58	+5 Laps
17	**GTD**	**12**	**(United States) AIM Vasser Sullivan**	**(United States) Townsend Bell (United States) Frankie Montecalvo**	**Lexus RC F GT3**	**57**	**+6 Laps‡**
17	**GTD**	**12**	**(United States) AIM Vasser Sullivan**	**(United States) Townsend Bell (United States) Frankie Montecalvo**	**Lexus 5.0L V8**	**57**	**+6 Laps‡**
18	GTD	86	(United States) Meyer Shank Racing with Curb-Agajanian	(Germany) Mario Farnbacher (United States) Matt McMurry	Acura NSX GT3 Evo	57	+6 Laps
18	GTD	86	(United States) Meyer Shank Racing with Curb-Agajanian	(Germany) Mario Farnbacher (United States) Matt McMurry	Acura 3.5L Turbo V6	57	+6 Laps
19	GTD	14	(United States) AIM Vasser Sullivan	(United Kingdom) Jack Hawksworth (United States) Aaron Telitz	Lexus RC F GT3	57	+6 Laps
19	GTD	14	(United States) AIM Vasser Sullivan	(United Kingdom) Jack Hawksworth (United States) Aaron Telitz	Lexus 5.0L V8	57	+6 Laps
20	GTD	63	(United States) Scuderia Corsa	(United States) Cooper MacNeil (Finland) Toni Vilander	Ferrari 488 GT3	57	+6 Laps
20	GTD	63	(United States) Scuderia Corsa	(United States) Cooper MacNeil (Finland) Toni Vilander	Ferrari F154CB 3.9L Turbo V8	57	+6 Laps
21	GTD	16	(United States) Wright Motorsports	(United States) Ryan Hardwick (United States) Patrick Long	Porsche 911 GT3 R	57	+6 Laps
21	GTD	16	(United States) Wright Motorsports	(United States) Ryan Hardwick (United States) Patrick Long	Porsche 4.0L Flat-6	57	+6 Laps
22	GTD	74	(United States) Riley Motorsports	(United States) Lawson Aschenbach (United States) Gar Robinson	Mercedes-AMG GT3 Evo	57	+6 Laps
22	GTD	74	(United States) Riley Motorsports	(United States) Lawson Aschenbach (United States) Gar Robinson	Mercedes-AMG M159 6.2L V8	57	+6 Laps
23	GTD	96	(United States) Turner Motorsport	(United States) Bill Auberlen (United States) Robby Foley	BMW M6 GT3	57	+6 Laps
23	GTD	96	(United States) Turner Motorsport	(United States) Bill Auberlen (United States) Robby Foley	BMW 4.4L Turbo V8	57	+6 Laps
24	GTD	44	(United States) GRT Magnus Racing Team	(United States) Andy Lally (United States) John Potter	Lamborghini Huracán GT3 Evo	57	+6 Laps
24	GTD	44	(United States) GRT Magnus Racing Team	(United States) Andy Lally (United States) John Potter	Lamborghini 5.2L V10	57	+6 Laps
25	GTD	76	(United States) Compass Racing	(United States) Corey Fergus (United States) Paul Holton	McLaren 720S GT3	57	+6 Laps
25	GTD	76	(United States) Compass Racing	(United States) Corey Fergus (United States) Paul Holton	McLaren M840T 4.0L Turbo V8	57	+6 Laps
26	GTD	30	(United States) Team Hardpoint	(United States) Rob Ferriol (United States) Spencer Pumpelly	Audi R8 LMS Evo	57	+6 Laps
26	GTD	30	(United States) Team Hardpoint	(United States) Rob Ferriol (United States) Spencer Pumpelly	Audi 5.2L V10	57	+6 Laps
27	GTLM	25	(United States) BMW Team RLL	(United States) Connor De Phillippi (Canada) Bruno Spengler	BMW M8 GTE	55	Mechanical
27	GTLM	25	(United States) BMW Team RLL	(United States) Connor De Phillippi (Canada) Bruno Spengler	BMW S63 4.0L Turbo V8	55	Mechanical
28	GTD	22	(United States) Gradient Racing	(United Kingdom) Till Bechtolsheimer (United States) Marc Miller	Acura NSX GT3 Evo	55	+8 Laps
28	GTD	22	(United States) Gradient Racing	(United Kingdom) Till Bechtolsheimer (United States) Marc Miller	Acura 3.5L Turbo V6	55	+8 Laps
29	LMP2	52	(United States) PR1/Mathiasen Motorsports	(United States) Patrick Kelly (Switzerland) Simon Trummer	Oreca 07	54	Crash
29	LMP2	52	(United States) PR1/Mathiasen Motorsports	(United States) Patrick Kelly (Switzerland) Simon Trummer	Gibson GK428 4.2 L V8	54	Crash
30	GTD	57	(United States) Heinricher Racing with MSR Curb-Agajanian	(Canada) Mikhail Goikhberg (Portugal) Álvaro Parente	Acura NSX GT3 Evo	48	Crash
30	GTD	57	(United States) Heinricher Racing with MSR Curb-Agajanian	(Canada) Mikhail Goikhberg (Portugal) Álvaro Parente	Acura 3.5L Turbo V6	48	Crash
31	GTD	23	(United States) Heart of Racing Team	(Canada) Roman De Angelis (United Kingdom) Ian James	Aston Martin Vantage GT3	0	Did not start
31	GTD	23	(United States) Heart of Racing Team	(Canada) Roman De Angelis (United Kingdom) Ian James	Aston Martin 4.0L Turbo V6	0	Did not start

== Standings after the race ==
DPi Drivers' Championship standings
Pos.	+/–	Driver	Points
1		(Australia) Ryan Briscoe (Netherlands) Renger van der Zande	124
2	1	(France) Sébastien Bourdais (Portugal) João Barbosa	118
3	1	(United Kingdom) Oliver Jarvis (United States) Tristan Nunez	117
4	1	(Brazil) Pipo Derani	115
5	1	(United States) Jonathan Bomarito (United Kingdom) Harry Tincknell	112

LMP2 Drivers' Championship standings
Pos.	+/–	Driver	Points
1	1	(Canada) Cameron Cassels	64
2	1	(United States) Patrick Kelly	63
3	2	(Sweden) Henrik Hedman	61
4	1	(United States) Dwight Merriman (United Kingdom) Kyle Tilley	60
5	4	(United States) Spencer Pigot	35

GTLM Drivers' Championship standings
Pos.	+/–	Driver	Points
1		(Spain) Antonio García (United States) Jordan Taylor	130
2		(New Zealand) Earl Bamber (Belgium) Laurens Vanthoor	120
3	1	(United Kingdom) Oliver Gavin (United States) Tommy Milner	117
4	1	(United States) John Edwards (Finland) Jesse Krohn	116
5		(France) Frédéric Makowiecki (United Kingdom) Nick Tandy	113

GTD Drivers' Championship standings
Pos.	+/–	Driver	Points
1		(United Kingdom) Jack Hawksworth	87
2	4	(United States) Townsend Bell (United States) Frankie Montecalvo	86
3	1	(United States) Aaron Telitz	84
4	4	(Germany) Mario Farnbacher (United States) Matt McMurry	83
5	1	(United States) Ryan Hardwick (United States) Patrick Long	78

- Note: Only the top five positions are included for all sets of standings.

DPi Teams' Championship standings
Pos.	+/–	Team	Points
1		(United States) #10 Konica Minolta Cadillac DPi-V.R	124
2	1	(United States) #5 Mustang Sampling Racing / JDC-Miller MotorSports	118
3	1	(Canada) #77 Mazda Motorsports	117
4	1	(United States) #31 Whelen Engineering Racing	115
5	1	(Canada) #55 Mazda Motorsports	112

LMP2 Teams' Championship standings
Pos.	+/–	Team	Points
1	1	(United States) #38 Performance Tech Motorsports	64
2	1	(United States) #52 PR1/Mathiasen Motorsports	63
3	2	(United States) #81 DragonSpeed USA	61
4	1	(United States) #18 Era Motorsport	60
5	1	(United States) #8 Tower Motorsport by Starworks	28

GTLM Teams' Championship standings
Pos.	+/–	Team	Points
1		(United States) #3 Corvette Racing	130
2	1	(United States) #912 Porsche GT Team	120
3	1	(United States) #4 Corvette Racing	117
4	1	(United States) #24 BMW Team RLL	116
5		(United States) #911 Porsche GT Team	113

GTD Teams' Championship standings
Pos.	+/–	Team	Points
1		(Canada) #14 AIM Vasser Sullivan	87
2	3	(Canada) #12 AIM Vasser Sullivan	86
3	3	(United States) #86 Meyer Shank Racing with Curb-Agajanian	83
4	1	(United States) #16 Wright Motorsports	78
5	2	(United States) #63 Scuderia Corsa	78

- Note: Only the top five positions are included for all sets of standings.

DPi Manufacturers' Championship standings
Pos.	+/–	Manufacturer	Points
1		(United States) Cadillac	134
2		(Japan) Mazda	129
3		(Japan) Acura	125

GTLM Manufacturers' Championship standings
Pos.	+/–	Manufacturer	Points
1		(United States) Chevrolet	135
2	1	(Germany) BMW	127
3	1	(Germany) Porsche	126
4		(Italy) Ferrari	28

GTD Manufacturers' Championship standings
Pos.	+/–	Manufacturer	Points
1	1	(Japan) Lexus	94
2	1	(Japan) Acura	89
3	2	(Italy) Ferrari	86
4		(Germany) Porsche	84
5	4	(Italy) Lamborghini	83

- Note: Only the top five positions are included for all sets of standings.

IMSA SportsCar Championship
Previous race: 2020 Cadillac Grand Prix of Sebring	2020 season	Next race: 2020 Michelin GT Challenge at VIR
