= Samantha Tan =

Canadian racing driver and team owner (born 1997)

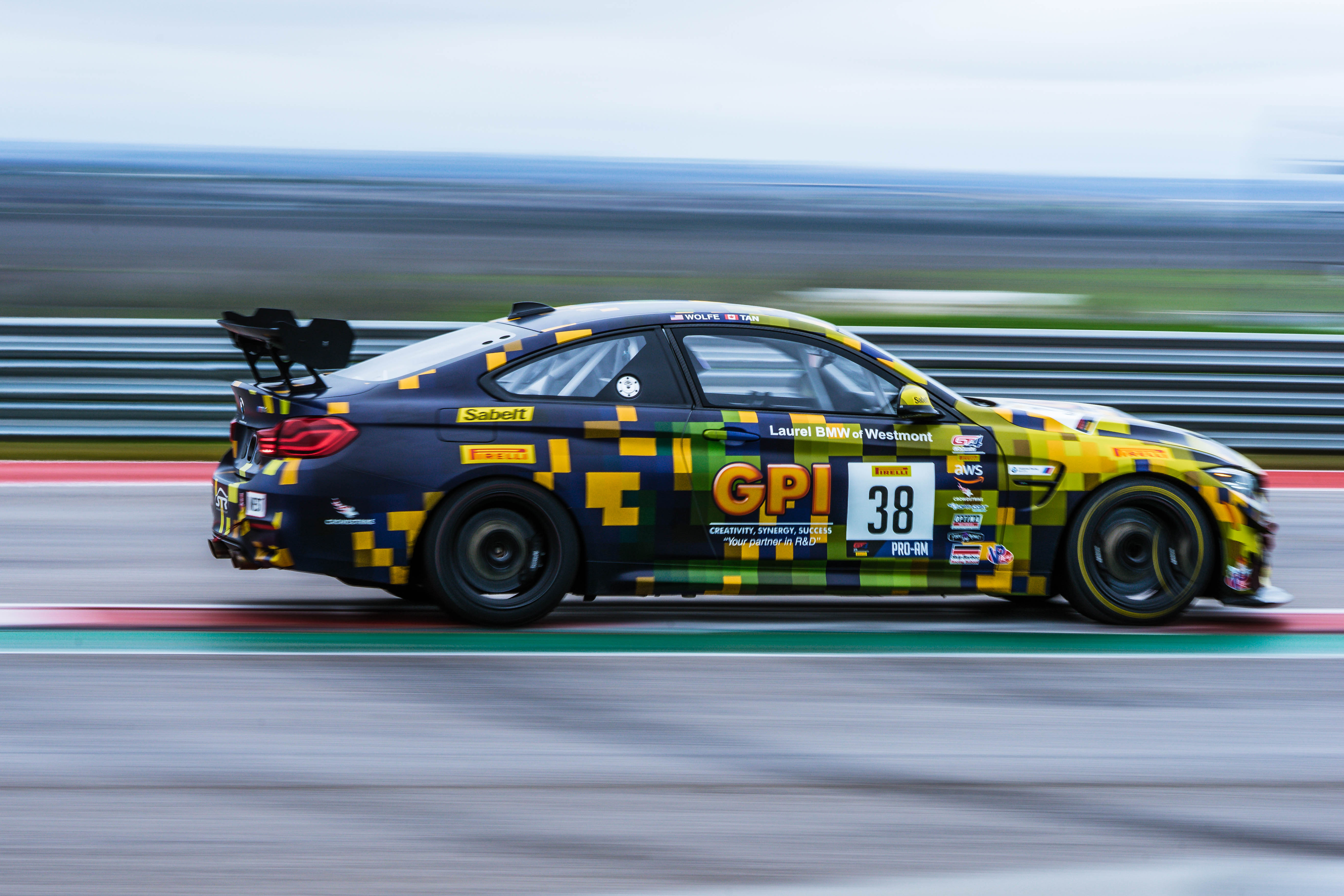
- Nationality: (Canada) Canadian
- Born: 9 August 1997 (age 29) Toronto, Ontario, Canada

GT World Challenge America career
- Debut season: 2015
- Current team: Samantha Tan Racing
- Categorisation: FIA Silver (until 2024); FIA Bronze (2025–)
- Former teams: Kinetic Motorsports, Team Ost Racing

Previous series
- 2021-22: 24H GT Series

Championship titles
- 2021: 24H GT Series

Samantha Tan (born 9 August 1997) is a Canadian racing driver and team owner, currently competing in Michelin Pilot Challenge with Random Vandals Racing. She is a global ambassador for BMW M Motorsport. Alongside her father Kenneth, Samantha owns sports car racing team ST Racing and auto tuning shop STR38 Motorsports.

== Racing career ==
Tan began racing at the age of 16, participating in events under the National Auto Sport Association in the Performance Touring E category with a modified 1991 Honda Civic. She moved on to race in the 2014 Canadian Touring Car Championship with a Mini Cooper. Tan made her debut in the Pirelli World Challenge in 2015, racing in a Kia Forte Koup in the TCA class. She returned the following year in 2016 under the same class, this time racing in a Honda Civic Si, finishing the year sixth overall. Tan would race in BMW machinery for the first time in 2017, driving a BMW M235iR for the full season, alongside a new teammate in Nick Wittmer. She would score 23 points and finish 29th in class.

Tan and Wittmer would move up into GT4 participating in the 2018 SprintX GT Championship Series, driving a BMW M4 GT4 now alongside each other in one car instead of as two separate entries. The team would participate in two rounds at Circuit of the Americas and Virginia International Raceway, scoring in all four of the available races as well as scoring a pole position and a podium in the second race at COTA. Tan would continue to improve throughout the 2019 and 2020 seasons of the GT4 America Series, finishing in the top-three of the standings in both seasons with teammates Jason Wolfe and Jon Miller. Tan would make her first venture outside of North America in 2021, competing in the 24H Series. Tan would earn her first championships as both a driver and team owner, winning three races including the 2021 Dubai 24 Hour on route to winning the 24H GT Series teams' and drivers' titles with teammates Chandler Hull and Jon Miller.

The following year, Tan moved up to GT3 cars, participating in the GT3 class in 2022 GT World Challenge America alongside Wittmer. Harry Gottsacker joined the pair for the 2022 Indianapolis 8 Hours, where the team finished the race in tenth overall as the only Silver entry. She also made her first appearance at the Spa 24 Hours endurance race in the 2022 edition of the event racing with Wittmer, Gottsacker, and Maxime Oosten, finishing 36th overall and ninth in class. For 2023, Tan participated in both the 2023 GT World Challenge America and the 2023 GT World Challenge Europe series.

Tan continued with the 2024 GT World Challenge America, sharing a car with Neil Verhagen. During the same season, Tan secured a class win in the Nürburgring Langstrecken Serie and made a GT4 European Series appearance at Spa-Francorchamps.

In 2025, Tan debuted at the Circuit de La Sarthe, finishing sixth and fourth in her first Road To Le Mans appearances in the Le Mans Cup. She also celebrated a class podium finish on her first Nürburgring 24 Hours. She also competed in the 2025 IMSA VP Racing SportsCar Challenge, winning the GTDX Bronze category and securing several overall GTDX podiums in BMW GT3 machinery.

In December 2025, Tan announced her entry into the 2026 Michelin Pilot Challenge in a partnership between ST Racing and Random Vandals. She will be joined by factory driver Bill Auberlen in the #38 BMW M4 GT4 Evo.

== Personal life ==
Tan was born in Toronto, Ontario, Canada to a Malaysian mother and a Filipino father, Kenneth Tan. Her mother studies at the University of Chicago, and her father Kenneth is a businessman, team principal, and co-owner alongside Samantha, of Samantha Tan Racing. She also has a brother, Kevin, who is pursuing a career in STEM. While racing in the National Auto Sport Association, Samantha Tan also studied at and has since graduated from UC Irvine with an economics degree.

== Racing record ==
=== Career summary ===
Season	Series	Team	Races	Wins	Poles	F/laps	Podiums	Points	Position
2014	Canadian Touring Car Championship	Team Octane	13	0	0	0	0	1048	5th
2015	Pirelli World Challenge - TCA	Kinetic Motorsports	16	0	0	0	0	1086	6th
2016	Pirelli World Challenge - TCA	Team Ost Racing	2	0	0	0	0	751	6th
2016	Pirelli World Challenge - TCA	Samantha Tan Racing	8	0	0	0	0	751	6th
2017	Pirelli World Challenge - TC	ST Racing	12	0	0	0	0	23	29th
2018	Pirelli World Challenge - GTS	ST Racing	4	0	0	0	1	45	7th
2019	GT4 America Series - SprintX West Pro-Am	ST Racing	10	0	1	3	7	148	2nd
2019	GT4 America Series - Sprint Am	ST Racing	1	0	0	0	0	10	20th
2019	GT4 America Series - Sprint	ST Racing	1	0	0	0	0	0	NC
2019	24H GT Series - GT4	ST Racing	2	0	0	0	0	-	N/A
2020	GT4 America Series - SprintX	ST Racing	15	0	1	5	6	190	3rd
2020	24H GT Series - GT4	ST Racing	1	0	0	0	0	18	10th
2021	24H GT Series - GT4	ST Racing	7	3	7	3	6	130	1st
2022	24H GT Series - GT3 Pro-Am	ST Racing	2	1	0	1	1	20	4th
2022	GT World Challenge America - Pro-Am	ST Racing	3	0	0	0	0	16	14th
2022	GT World Challenge Europe Endurance Cup	ST Racing	1	0	0	0	0	0	NC
2022	GT World Challenge Europe Endurance Cup - Silver	ST Racing	1	0	0	0	0	2	29th
2023	GT World Challenge America - Pro-Am	ST Racing	13	1	1	4	5	155	4th
2023	Intercontinental GT Challenge	ST Racing	1	0	0	0	0	4	28th
2023	GT World Challenge Europe Endurance Cup	ST Racing with Rinaldi	5	0	0	0	0	0	NC
2023	GT World Challenge Europe Endurance Cup - Pro-Am	ST Racing with Rinaldi	5	1	1	1	2	69	3rd
2024	GT World Challenge America - Pro-Am	ST Racing	13	3	1	1	10	223	2nd
2024	GT4 European Series - Pro-Am	ST Racing	2	0	0	0	0	12	22nd
2024	Nürburgring Langstrecken-Serie - SP8T	ST Racing	1	1	0	0	1	-	N/A
2024	24H Series - GT4	ST Racing	2	0	0	0	1	50	7th
2024	GT America Series - GT4	STR38 Motorsports	2	0	0	0	1	28	8th
2025	IMSA VP Racing SportsCar Challenge - GTDX	ST Racing	12	0	0	0	4	3360	3rd
2025	Nürburgring Langstrecken-Serie - SP8T	ST Racing	1	0	0	0	0	-	N/A
2025	Le Mans Cup - GT3	Team WRT	2	0	0	0	0	-	N/A
2026	Michelin Pilot Challenge - GS	ST Racing by Random Vandals Racing	10	0	0	0	0	1550	20th
2026	China GT Championship - GT3	Team KRC							
2026	Supercar Challenge - GT	Koopman Racing	2	0	0	0	1	20	16th
