= 2022 Indianapolis 8 Hours =

Indianapolis 8 Hours (6–9 October 2022)

(United States) 2022 Indianapolis 8 Hours
Event Information
- Round 3 of 4 in the 2022 Intercontinental GT Challenge
- Date: 8 October 2022 Intercontinental GT Challenge
- Location: Speedway, Indiana, United States
- Venue: Indianapolis Motor Speedway

Results
Race 1
Distance	328 laps	799.99 miles (1,287.46 km) km
Pole position	(United States) No. 33 Winward Racing (driver for session: (France) Jules Gounon); Winward Racing	1:22.190
Winner	(Spain) Daniel Juncadella (Switzerland) Raffaele Marciello (Canada) Daniel Morad (Hong Kong) Mercedes-AMG Team Craft-Bamboo Racing	8:00:34.571

The 2022 Indianapolis 8 Hours (also known as the Indianapolis 8 Hour Presented by AWS for sponsorship reasons) was the third running of the Indianapolis 8 Hour. It took place from October 6–9, 2022. The race was the third round of the 2022 Intercontinental GT Challenge and the seventh and final round 2022 GT World Challenge America championships. For the 2022 race, the event returned to the IndyCar grand prix layout after having used the SCCA runoff course the previous year.

== Background ==
The 2022 was open only to cars within GT3 regulations. GT4 cars, which had appeared in the first two races, were dropped from the race in an effort to reduce incidents caused by multi-class racing.

Adjustments were made to driver lineups for Pro class cars, with all Pro teams now required to include an FIA silver-rated driver as part of the lineup.

Supporting the race weekend were the Pirelli GT4 America Series, the TC America Series, and the GT America Series.

== Entry list ==
No.	Entrant	Car	Class	Driver 1	Driver 2	Driver 3
04	(United States) Crowdstrike with Riley Motorsports	Mercedes-AMG GT3 Evo	PA	(United States) Colin Braun	(United States) Ben Keating	(United States) George Kurtz
08	(United States) DXDT Racing	Mercedes-AMG GT3 Evo	Am	(United States) David Askew	(Germany) Valentin Pierburg	(United States) Scott Smithson
1	(United States) K-Pax Racing	Lamborghini Huracán GT3 Evo	P	(Italy) Michele Beretta	(Italy) Andrea Caldarelli	(Italy) Marco Mapelli
3	(United States) K-Pax Racing	Lamborghini Huracán GT3 Evo	P	(Canada) Misha Goikhberg	(South Africa) Jordan Pepper	(France) Franck Perera
6	(United States) US RaceTronics	Mercedes-AMG GT3 Evo	P	(United States) Steven Aghakhani	(Italy) Loris Spinelli	(France) Tristan Vautier
13	(United States) Triarsi Competizione	Ferrari 488 GT3 Evo 2020	PA	(United Kingdom) Ryan Dalziel	(United States) Conrad Grunewald	(United States) Justin Wetherill
23	(United States) Triarsi Competizione	Ferrari 488 GT3 Evo 2020	PA	(Italy) Alessio Rovera	(United States) Charlie Scardina	(United States) Onofrio Triarsi
32	(United States) GMG Racing	Porsche 911 GT3 R	PA	(Austria) Klaus Bachler	(United States) James Sofronas	(United States) Kyle Washington
33	(United States) Winward Racing	Mercedes-AMG GT3 Evo	P	(Switzerland) Philip Ellis	(France) Jules Gounon	(United States) Russell Ward
34	(United States) Conquest Racing	Ferrari 488 GT3 Evo 2020	P	(Italy) Alessandro Balzan	(Italy) Daniel Mancinelli	(Monaco) Cédric Sbirrazzuoli
38	(Canada) ST Racing	BMW M4 GT3	S	(United States) Harry Gottsacker	(Canada) Samantha Tan	(Canada) Nick Wittmer
39	(United States) Stephen Cameron Racing LLC	Mercedes-AMG GT3 Evo	PA	(United States) Chris Cagnazzi	(United States) Guy Cosmo	(United States) Shane Lewis
43	(United States) RealTime Racing	Acura NSX GT3 Evo22	PA	(United States) Michael Cooper	(United States) Taylor Hagler	(United States) Erin Vogel
45	(United States) Wright Motorsports	Porsche 911 GT3 R	PA	(Germany) Elia Erhart	(Belgium) Jan Heylen	(United States) Charlie Luck
51	(Italy) AF Corse - Francorchamps	Ferrari 488 GT3 Evo 2020	P	(Spain) Miguel Molina	(France) Pierre Ragues	(Italy) Davide Rigon
63	(United States) DXDT Racing	Mercedes-AMG GT3 Evo	P	(Germany) Patrick Assenheimer	(Germany) Dirk Müller	(United States) Bryan Sellers
71	(Italy) AF Corse - Francorchamps	Ferrari 488 GT3 Evo 2020	P	(Belgium) Ulysse de Pauw	(Italy) Antonio Fuoco	(Brazil) Daniel Serra
75	(Australia) SunEnergy1 Racing by AKKodis ASP	Mercedes-AMG GT3 Evo	PA	(Austria) Dominik Baumann	(Australia) Kenny Habul	(Austria) Martin Konrad
77	(Hong Kong) Mercedes-AMG Team Craft-Bamboo Racing	Mercedes-AMG GT3 Evo	P	(Spain) Daniel Juncadella	(Switzerland) Raffaele Marciello	(Canada) Daniel Morad
88	(United States) Zelus Motorsports	Lamborghini Huracán GT3 Evo	Am	(United States) Jason Daskalos	(United States) Jason Harward	(United States) Seth Lucas
91	(United States) TR3 Racing	Lamborghini Huracán GT3 Evo	PA	(United States) Jon Branam	(United States) Jeff Burton	(United States) Corey Lewis
93	(United States) Racers Edge Motorsports	Acura NSX GT3 Evo22	PA	(Germany) Mario Farnbacher	(United States) Ashton Harrison	(Denmark) Christina Nielsen
94	(United States) Bimmerworld Racing	BMW M4 GT3	PA	(United States) Bill Auberlen	(United States) Chandler Hull	(United States) Richard Heistand
96	(United States) Turner Motorsport	BMW M4 GT3	P	(United States) Michael Dinan	(United States) John Edwards	(United States) Robby Foley
218	(United States) Andretti Autosport x Vital Speed	Ferrari 488 GT3 Evo 2018	P	(United States) Jarett Andretti	(Australia) Ryan Briscoe	(United States) Jeff Westphal
Entry List

Icon	Class
P	Pro Cup
S	Silver Cup
PA	Pro/Am Cup
Am	Am Cup

== Race result ==
Class winners denoted with bold and ‡.

Pos.	Class	No.	Team / Entrant	Drivers	Car	Laps	Time/Retired
1	Pro	77	(Hong Kong) Mercedes-AMG Team Craft-Bamboo Racing	(Spain) Daniel Juncadella (Switzerland) Raffaele Marciello (Canada) Daniel Morad	Mercedes-AMG GT3 Evo	328	8:00:34.571‡
2	Pro	71	(Italy) AF Corse - Francorchamps	(Belgium) Ulysse de Pauw (Italy) Antonio Fuoco (Brazil) Daniel Serra	Ferrari 488 GT3 Evo 2020	328	+0.800
3	Pro	96	(United States) Turner Motorsport	(United States) Michael Dinan (United States) John Edwards (United States) Robby Foley	BMW M4 GT3	328	+1:05.864
4	Pro	33	(United States) Winward Racing	(Switzerland) Philip Ellis (France) Jules Gounon (United States) Russell Ward	Mercedes-AMG GT3 Evo	328	+1:16.351
5	Pro	51	(Italy) AF Corse - Francorchamps	(Spain) Miguel Molina (France) Pierre Ragues (Italy) Davide Rigon	Ferrari 488 GT3 Evo 2020	326	+2 Laps
6	Pro-Am	94	(United States) Bimmerworld Racing	(United States) Bill Auberlen (United States) Chandler Hull (United States) Richard Heistand	BMW M4 GT3	326	+2 Laps‡
7	Pro-Am	75	(Australia) SunEnergy1 Racing by AKKodis ASP	(Austria) Dominik Baumann (Australia) Kenny Habul (Austria) Martin Konrad	Mercedes-AMG GT3 Evo	325	+3 Laps
8	Pro	34	(United States) Conquest Racing	(Italy) Alessandro Balzan (Italy) Daniel Mancinelli (Monaco) Cédric Sbirrazzuoli	Ferrari 488 GT3 Evo 2020	325	+3 Laps
9	Pro-Am	93	(United States) Racers Edge Motorsports	(Germany) Mario Farnbacher (United States) Ashton Harrison (Denmark) Christina Nielsen	Acura NSX GT3 Evo22	324	+4 Laps
10	Silver	38	(Canada) ST Racing	(United States) Harry Gottsacker (Canada) Samantha Tan (Canada) Nick Wittmer	BMW M4 GT3	324	+4 Laps‡
11	Pro	3	(United States) K-Pax Racing	(Canada) Misha Goikhberg (South Africa) Jordan Pepper (France) Franck Perera	Lamborghini Huracán GT3 Evo	323	+5 Laps
12	Pro-Am	91	(United States) TR3 Racing	(United States) Jon Branam (United States) Jeff Burton (United States) Corey Lewis	Lamborghini Huracán GT3 Evo	322	+6 Laps
13	Pro-Am	32	(United States) GMG Racing	(Austria) Klaus Bachler (United States) James Sofronas (United States) Kyle Washington	Porsche 911 GT3 R	322	+6 Laps
14	Pro-Am	13	(United States) Triarsi Competizione	(United Kingdom) Ryan Dalziel (United States) Conrad Grunewald (United States) Justin Wetherill	Ferrari 488 GT3 Evo 2020	321	+7 Laps
15	Pro	218	(United States) Andretti Autosport x Vital Speed	(United States) Jarett Andretti (Australia) Ryan Briscoe (United States) Jeff Westphal	Ferrari 488 GT3 Evo 2018	314	+14 Laps
16	Pro-Am	45	(United States) Wright Motorsports	(Germany) Elia Erhart (Belgium) Jan Heylen (United States) Charlie Luck	Porsche 911 GT3 R	309	+19 Laps
17	Am	88	(United States) Zelus Motorsports	(United States) Jason Daskalos (United States) Jason Harward (United States) Seth Lucas	Lamborghini Huracán GT3 Evo	301	+27 Laps‡
18	Am	08	(United States) DXDT Racing	(United States) David Askew (Germany) Valentin Pierburg (United States) Scott Smithson	Mercedes-AMG GT3 Evo	288	+40 Laps
19	Pro-Am	43	(United States) RealTime Racing	(United States) Michael Cooper (United States) Taylor Hagler (United States) Erin Vogel	Acura NSX GT3 Evo22	286	+42 Laps
20	Pro-Am	04	(United States) Crowdstrike with Riley Motorsports	(United States) Colin Braun (United States) Ben Keating (United States) George Kurtz	Mercedes-AMG GT3 Evo	236	+92 Laps
NC	Pro-Am	23	(United States) Triarsi Competizione	(Italy) Alessio Rovera (United States) Charlie Scardina (United States) Onofrio Triarsi	Ferrari 488 GT3 Evo 2018	226	Contact
NC	Pro	63	(United States) DXDT Racing	(Germany) Patrick Assenheimer (Germany) Dirk Müller (United States) Bryan Sellers	Mercedes-AMG GT3 Evo	209	Contact
NC	Pro	1	(United States) K-Pax Racing	(Italy) Michele Beretta (Italy) Andrea Caldarelli (Italy) Marco Mapelli	Lamborghini Huracán GT3 Evo	178	Accident
NC	Pro-Am	39	(United States) Stephen Cameron Racing LLC	(United States) Chris Cagnazzi (United States) Guy Cosmo (United States) Shane Lewis	Mercedes-AMG GT3 Evo	103	Contact damage
NC	Pro	6	(United States) US RaceTronics	(United States) Steven Aghakhani (Italy) Loris Spinelli (France) Tristan Vautier	Mercedes-AMG GT3 Evo	101	Vibration
Intercontinental GT Challenge results
GT World Challenge America results

Intercontinental GT Challenge
Previous race: 2022 24 Hours of Spa	2022 season	Next race: 2022 Gulf 12 Hours (December)
