= Harry Gottsacker =

American racing driver (born 1999)

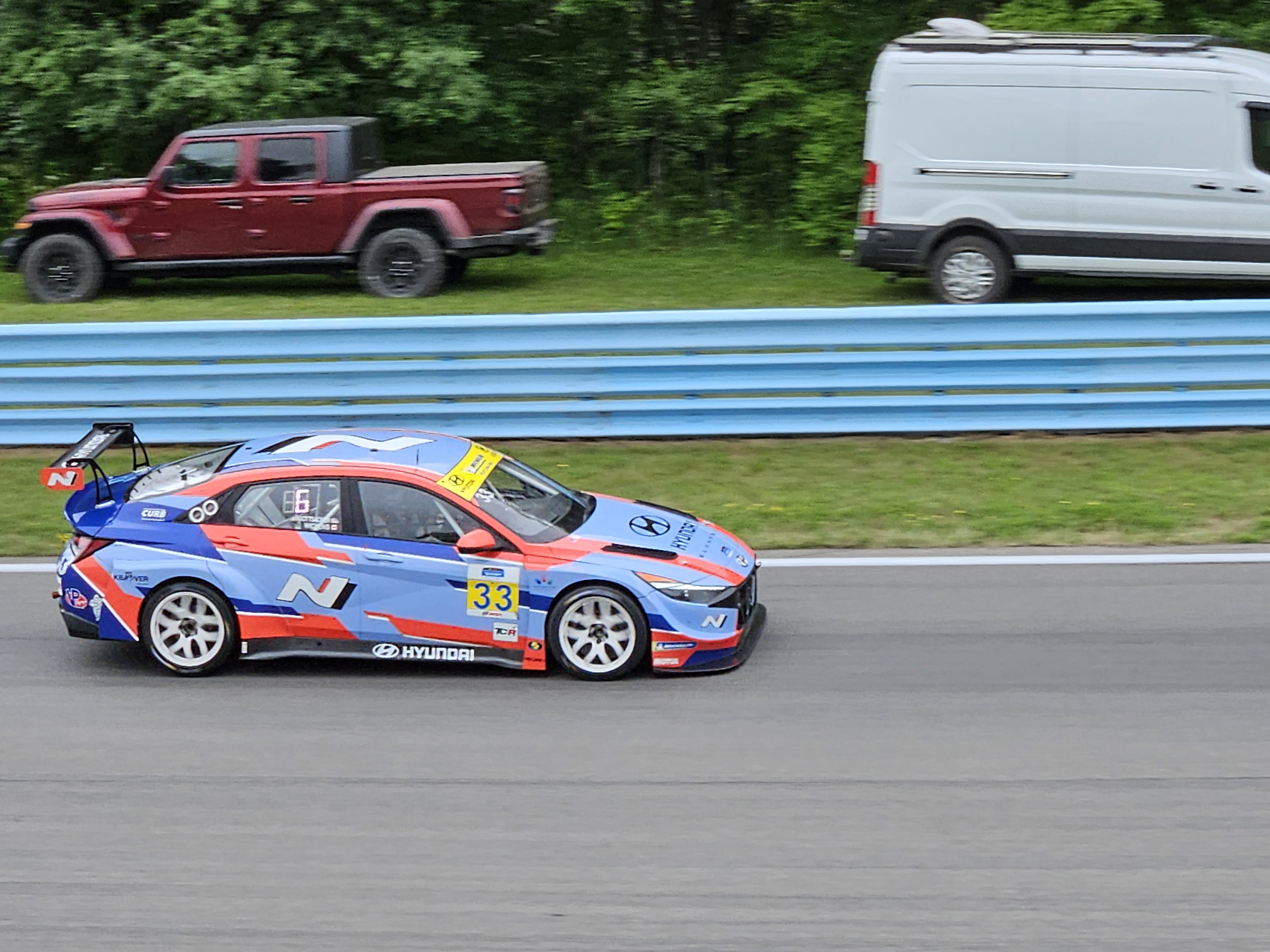
- Nationality: American
- Born: July 28, 1999 (age 27) Alamo Heights, Texas, U.S.

Michelin Pilot Challenge career
- Debut season: 2019
- Current team: Bryan Herta Autosport
- Categorisation: FIA Silver
- Car number: 18
- Starts: 50
- Wins: 5
- Podiums: 18
- Poles: 7
- Fastest laps: 2

Previous series
- 2019–2021 2018 2017 2016–2018 2016: GT4 America Series; IMSA Prototype Challenge; British GT Championship; Pirelli World Challenge; Global Rallycross

Championship titles
- 2025 2023 2019: Michelin Pilot Challenge – TCR; Michelin Pilot Challenge – TCR; GT4 America Series – West Pro-Am Cup
- Statistics up to date as of January 23, 2026.

Harry Gottsacker (born July 28, 1999) is an American racing driver who currently competes for Bryan Herta Autosport in the TCR class of the Michelin Pilot Challenge.

== Career ==
=== Early career ===
Gottsacker was introduced to motorsports through his grandfather, who brought him to drag racing events when Gottsacker was young. Gottsacker began racing himself through karting at the age of 13, competing in a wealth of SKUSA-sanctioned championships. At the age of 14, he was selected to represent the United States at the KZ2 World Championship. Despite graduating from full-time karting at the end of 2017, Gottsacker continues to compete to maintain sharpness during the winter offseason.

=== Rallycross ===
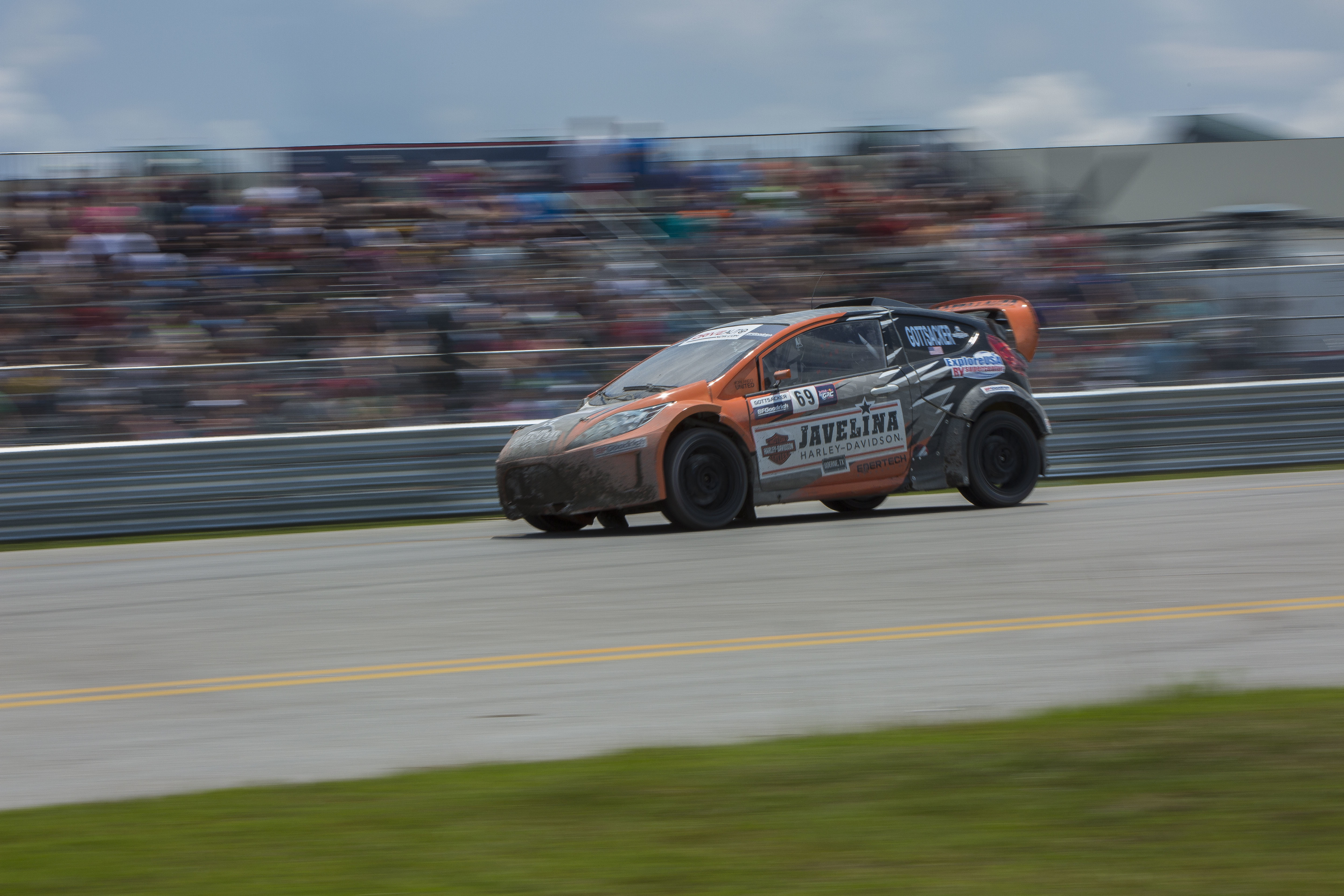
Gottsacker's GRC Lites car in 2016.

For 2016, Gottsacker embarked upon a part-time campaign in the Global Rallycross Championship, driving in the GRC Lites class for PMG Rallysport. In his rookie season, he registered five starts and a best finish of fifth, at both the Fair Park and Marine Corps Air Station New River events. Gottsacker ended the season 13th in the points classification, level on points with teammate Parker Chase.

=== Sports car racing ===
Alongside his Rallycross debut, Gottsacker completed a half-season with Performance Motorsports Group in the Pirelli World Challenge for 2016. Driving a Ginetta G55 GT4, he finished a season-best fifth place at Laguna Seca, finishing 13th in the GTS classification. Gottsacker expanded his relationship with Ginetta the following season, joining the marque's Young Driver Development Program for 2017. The first class, which included Gottsacker and fellow American driver Parker Chase, made up the backbone of Century Motorsport's factory-backed Ginetta GT3 entry into the 2017 British GT Championship. Joining team boss Nathan Freke, Gottsacker would only compete in the first three rounds of the campaign, taking the Silver class victory in the opening round at Oulton Park. Shortly before the round at Snetterton, Chase and Gottsacker both withdrew from the program, citing a desire to pursue other motorsport ventures.

Following his short tenure in British GT, Gottsacker began an additional part-time campaign in the Pirelli World Challenge, returning to Performance Motorsports Group. Entered into the GTSA class for the opening round at St. Pete, he scored the class victory in the second race of the weekend. In subsequent appearances in 2017, he was classified as a Pro driver, only eligible for the GTS class championship at large. Gottsacker returned to the championship at Road America, taking his first overall GTS podium at Mid-Ohio the following month. In May of that year, Gottsacker made his debut in the IMSA SportsCar Championship, pairing with Chase in a TRG-entered Porsche 911 GT3 R in the GTD class.

For 2018, Gottsacker stepped up to a full-time drive in the Pirelli World Challenge, joining Racers Edge Motorsports. The move was accompanied by a change in manufacturer, with Gottsacker piloting a GT4-homologated SIN R1, once again in the GTS class. He scored his first podium of the season at COTA in March, beginning his SprintX campaign on a high note. After a difficult round at VIR and a pair of strong finishes at Lime Rock, Gottsacker would score his first GTS victory at Portland. After taking pole for the first race of the weekend, he would win race two, holding a nine-second gap over the second-placed Panoz Avezzano of Ian James and Matt Keegan. Gottsacker added another victory in the final round of the season at Utah Motorsports Campus, but would miss out on the GTS class title by three points to James Sofronas and Alex Welch. To close his 2018 campaign, Gottsacker joined Extreme Speed Motorsports in the IMSA Prototype Challenge, finishing fourth in a one-off appearance at Road Atlanta alongside co-driver Max Hanratty.

2019 saw Gottsacker swap manufacturers once again, joining ST Racing's BMW entry into the new GT4 America Series following the dissolution of the Pirelli World Challenge at the end of 2018. He and co-driver Jon Miller competed in the West Pro-Am sub-classification, taking the title at year's end after winning six of the ten races on the schedule. Sweeping the weekends at COTA and Las Vegas, alongside one each at Laguna Seca and Portland, the duo claimed the title by a sizable 68 points over the sister BMW of Samantha Tan and Jason Wolfe. The following season, Gottsacker paired with Nick Wittmer, entering the championship's Silver Cup class. The duo collected four race victories, with two class wins at COTA and one each at VIR and Road America, en route to a second-place points finish. The championship came down to the final race of the season, with Gottsacker and Wittmer falling six points short of champions Jarett Andretti and Colin Mullan.

Gottsacker returned to a reduced GT4 schedule in 2021, making only a one-off appearance for ST Racing at Road America. Joining fellow Hyundai TCR driver Tyler Maxson, the duo rebounded from a difficult first race to take the Silver Cup victory in the second race of the weekend. 2022 saw Gottsacker continue his relationship with the team, joining the team's customer debut of the BMW M4 GT3 at the 24 Hours of Dubai. Later that year, Gottsacker took part in the 24 Hours of Spa and Indianapolis 8 Hours with the team, winning the Silver class in the latter as the only entrant.

In early 2022, Gottsacker made his debut at the 12 Hours of Sebring, joining Mühlner Motorsport as a late replacement for Moritz Kranz. Driving alongside Alec Udell and Ugo de Wilde, the team finished ninth in the LMP3 class following an accident.

Gottsacker returned to GT4 racing in 2023, joining Chandler Hull in a Silver Cup entry for STR38 Motorsports in the 2023 GT4 America Series, beginning with the round at NOLA Motorsports Park. Through ten races, Gottsacker claimed two class podium finishes, ending the season eighth in the Silver Cup championship.

=== TCR ===
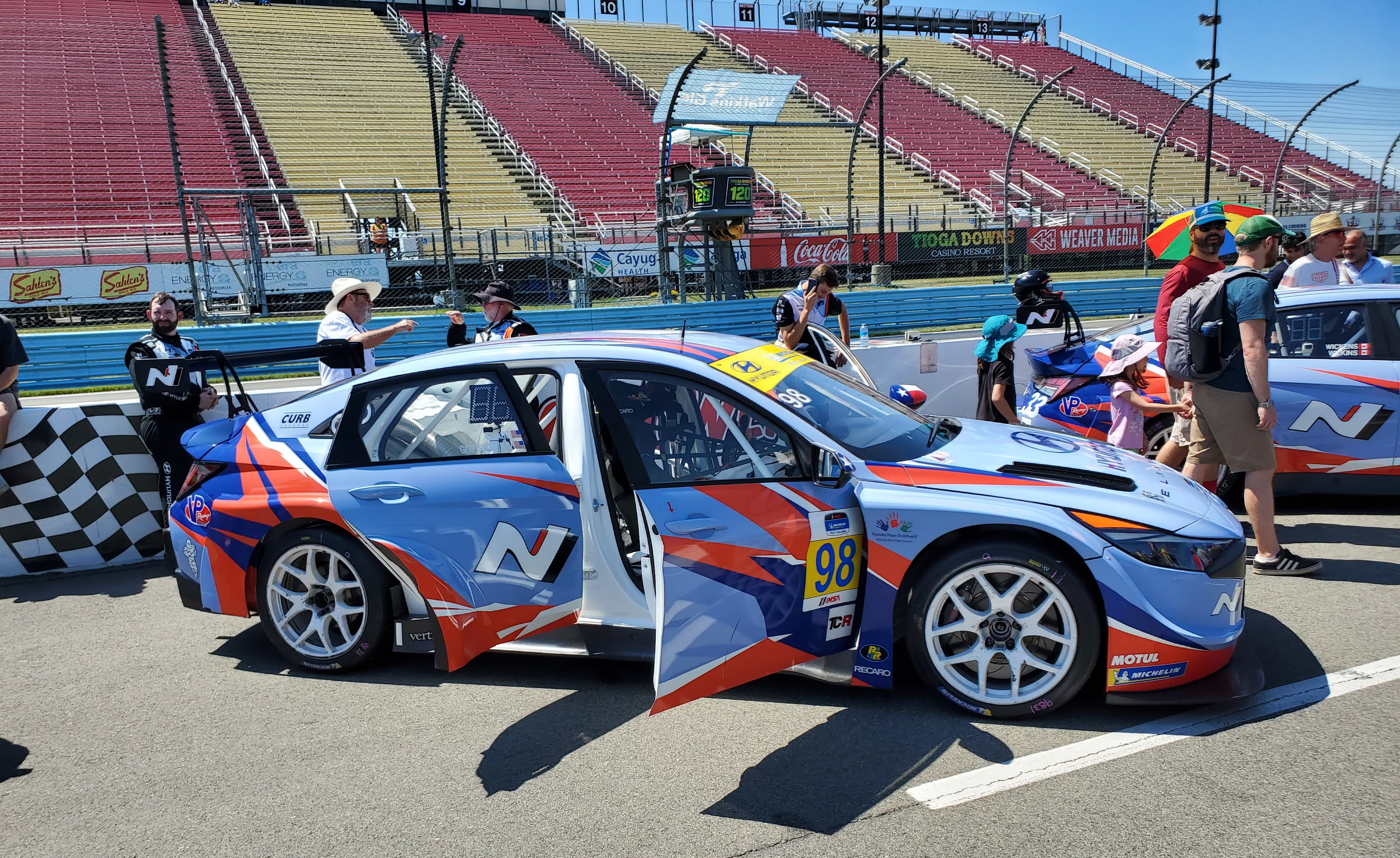
Gottsacker's Hyundai Elantra N TCR in 2022

To begin 2019, Gottsacker was contracted to drive the new-for-2019 Hyundai Veloster N TCR, serving as one of Hyundai's North America-based factory drivers for the 2019 Michelin Pilot Challenge season. Paired with Mason Filippi, the two scored three podiums and one race victory in 2019, finishing second in the championship; 23 points adrift of the sister entry. Said victory came in dramatic fashion, after a drive-time penalty dropped the race-winning HART entry to the back of the TCR classification, elevating Filippi and Gottsacker to the race victory. Gottsacker returned to the team in 2020, paired with new co-driver Mark Wilkins. Gottsacker would match his second-place result from 2019, taking two victories and four total podiums. The duo swept the two rounds at Sebring, falling 11 points short of the sister No. 33 entry of Gabby Chaves and Ryan Norman.

The following season saw Hyundai debut the Elantra N TCR, with Gottsacker continuing to pair with Wilkins, this time behind the wheel of Bryan Herta Autosport's No. 33 entry. The two claimed their only victory of the season at Laguna Seca, finishing fifth in the championship. Gottsacker returned to the team in 2022, this time in the team's No. 98 entry alongside long-time teammate Parker Chase. The two scored their first victory of the season at Mid-Ohio in May, registering two total podiums en route to a fifth-place finish in the class championship.

The team's reduction to three entries for 2023 saw Gottsacker change co-drivers, running alongside Robert Wickens. The duo tallied seven podium finishes over the course of the ten-race season, claiming the TCR-class championship by 60 points over teammates Filippi and Wilkins without scoring a race victory. In addition, Gottsacker was also included in Hyundai North America's lineup for the 2023 Nürburgring 24 Hours, where he'd make his debut alongside fellow factory drivers Michael Lewis, Mason Filippi, and Taylor Hagler. In the months leading up to the race, Gottsacker chronicled his journey to the race in a Sportscar365 column, outlining the team's efforts in the Nürburgring Endurance Series VT2 class with the Hyundai i30 N. Gottsacker's sophomore effort at the 2024 edition of the event yielded a class victory, where he scored a TCR-class triumph alongside Filippi, Wilkins, and Bryson Morris.

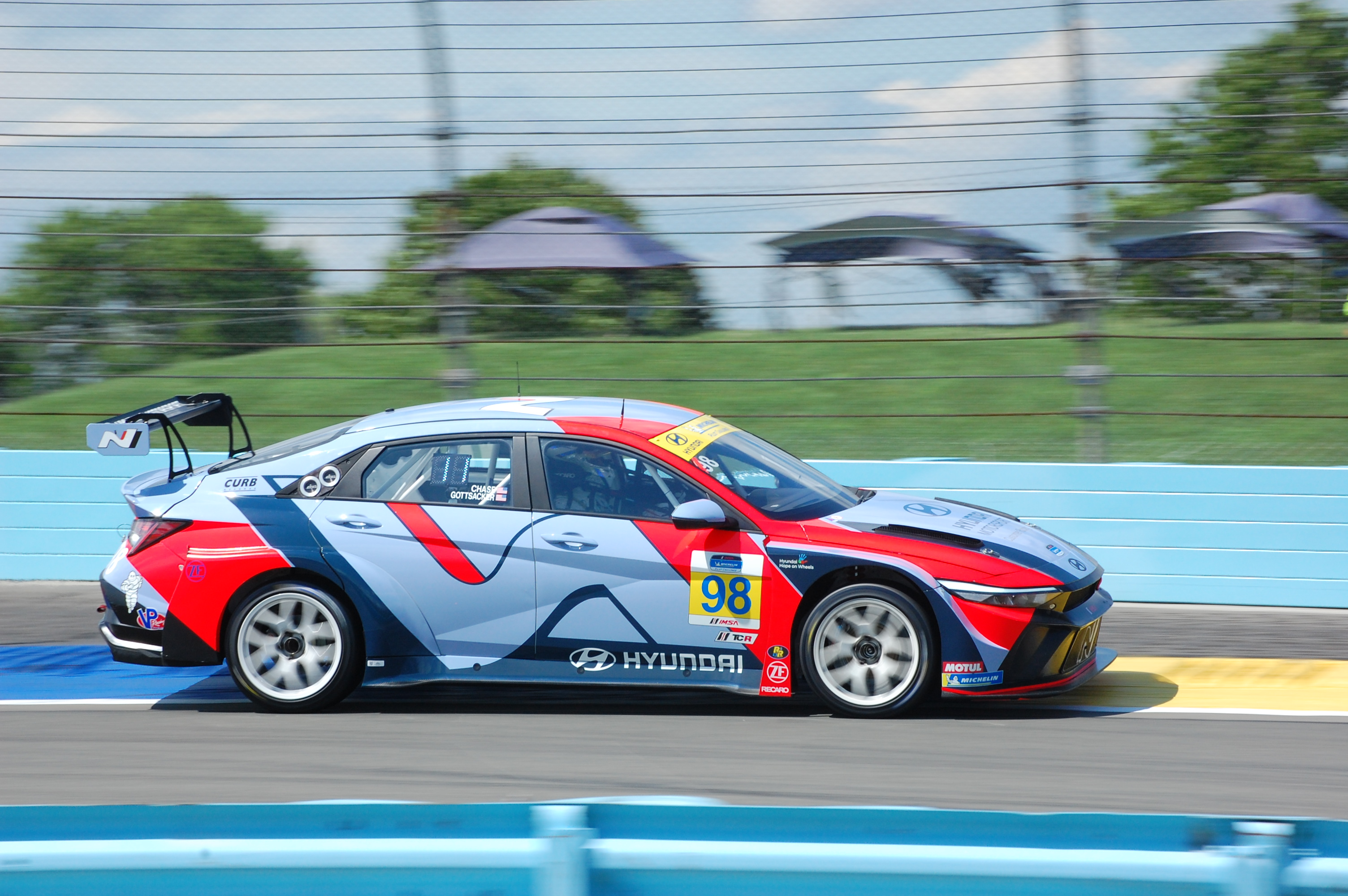
Gottsacker's Elantra at Watkins Glen in 2025

Gottsacker and Wickens returned to the No. 33 entry in 2024 with the aim of defending their championship title. They kicked off the season with a pole at Daytona, marking the eighth of Gottsacker's IMSA career, but retired during the race. They scored consecutive podium finishes in the following rounds at Sebring and Laguna Seca, before scoring their first and only victory of the season at Mosport in July. The duo would conclude the season with six total podium finishes, finishing third in the TCR-class championship. 2024 also saw Gottsacker make his debut in the TCR World Tour, taking part in the pair of races run in support of the Michelin Pilot Challenge at Mid-Ohio.

Gottsacker switched co-drivers in 2025, partnering once again with Mason Filippi for the season. The duo scored their first class victory of the season at Sebring, after the sister #33 was stripped of the win following a post-race penalty. They finished runners-up at Laguna Seca, before returning to the top step of the podium during the ensuing round at Mid-Ohio. Filippi's commitments at the Nürburgring 24 split the duo at Watkins Glen, where Gottsacker finished on the podium alongside Parker Chase. Although they scored no podiums in the final five races, Gottsacker clinched the championship at Road Atlanta, holding a 20-point gap over Preston Brown and Denis Dupont.

== Personal life ==
Gottsacker is an avid fisher, and received his Eagle Scout certification while in high school. Gottsacker has a close relationship with fellow driver Robert Wickens, who he has frequently referenced as his central father figure.

== Racing record ==
=== Career summary ===
Season	Series	Team	Races	Wins	Poles	F/Laps	Podiums	Points	Position
2016	Pirelli World Challenge - GTS	Performance Motorsports Group	13	0	0	0	0	691	13th
2016	Global RallyCross Championship - GRC Lites	Performance Motorsports Group	5	0	0	0	0	85	13th
2017	Pirelli World Challenge - GTS	Performance Motorsports Group	8	0	1	1	2	129	11th
2017	Pirelli World Challenge - GTSA	Performance Motorsports Group	2	1	0	0	1	36	20th
2017	British GT Championship - GT3	Century Motorsport	3	0	0	0	0	8	18th
2017	IMSA SportsCar Championship - GTD	TRG	1	0	0	0	0	15	75th
2018	Pirelli World Challenge SprintX - GTS	Racers Edge Motorsports	10	2	4	2	6	173	**2nd**
2018	Pirelli World Challenge - GTS	Racers Edge Motorsports	8	0	0	0	2	128	5th
2018	IMSA Prototype Challenge - LMP3	Extreme Speed Motorsports	1	0	0	0	0	28	38th
2019	Michelin Pilot Challenge - TCR	Bryan Herta Autosport with Curb-Agajanian	10	1	0	0	3	268	**2nd**
2019	GT4 America Series SprintX - West Pro-Am	ST Racing	10	5	2	1	9	216	**1st**
2019	24H Series Continents - GT4	ST Racing	1	0	0	0	1	24	16th
2020	GT4 America Series SprintX - Silver	ST Racing	14	4	5	4	10	245	**2nd**
2020	Michelin Pilot Challenge - TCR	Bryan Herta Autosport with Curb-Agajanian	10	2	3	0	4	278	**2nd**
2021	GT4 America Series - Silver	ST Racing	2	1	0	0	1	29	11th
2021	Michelin Pilot Challenge - TCR	Bryan Herta Autosport with Curb-Agajanian	10	1	1	1	2	2550	5th
2022	Michelin Pilot Challenge - TCR	Bryan Herta Autosport with Curb-Agajanian	10	1	1	1	2	2580	5th
2022	IMSA SportsCar Championship - LMP3	Mühlner Motorsports America	1	0	0	0	0	250	35th
2022	24H Series Continents - GT3 Pro-Am	ST Racing	1	0	0	0	1	20	5th*
2022	GT World Challenge Europe Endurance Cup	ST Racing	1	0	0	0	0	0	NC
2023	Michelin Pilot Challenge - TCR	Bryan Herta Autosport with Curb-Agajanian	10	0	1	0	7	3010	**1st**
2023	GT4 America Series - Silver	STR38 Motorsports	10	0	?	?	2	108	8th
2023	24 Hours of Nürburgring - TCR	Hyundai Motorsport N	1	0	0	0	1	N/A	**2nd**
2024	Michelin Pilot Challenge - TCR	Bryan Herta Autosport with Curb-Agajanian	10	1	3	0	6	2880	**3rd**
2024	TCR World Tour	Bryan Herta Autosport	2	0	0	0	0	6	31st
2024	24 Hours of Nürburgring - TCR	Hyundai Motorsport N	1	1	?	?	1	N/A	**1st**
2025	Michelin Pilot Challenge - TCR	Bryan Herta Autosport with Curb-Agajanian	10	2	1	0	4	2820	**1st**
2025	Lamborghini Super Trofeo North America - Pro-Am	RAFA Racing Team	2	1	0	?	1	19	13th
2026	Michelin Pilot Challenge - TCR	Bryan Herta Autosport with PR1/Mathiasen							
2026	GT4 America Series - Silver	Off-Leash Motorsports							

^{*} Season still in progress.

=== Complete IMSA SportsCar Championship results ===
(key) (Races in bold indicate pole position)

Year	Team	Class	Make	Engine	1	2	3	4	5	6	7	8	9	10	11	12	Rank	Points
2017	TRG	GTD	Porsche 911 GT3 R	Porsche 4.0 L Flat-6	DAY	SEB	LBH	COA; 16	BEL	WGL	MOS	LIM	ELK	VIR	LGA	PET	75th	15
2022	Mühlner Motorsports America	LMP3	Duqueine D-08	Nissan VK56DE 5.6 L V8	DAY	SEB; 9	MOH	WGL	MOS	ELK	PET						35th	250

Sporting positions
Preceded by Series Founded	GT4 America Series; SprintX West Pro-Am Cup Champion; 2019; With: Jon Miller	Succeeded by Class Folded
Preceded by Taylor Hagler; Michael Lewis	Michelin Pilot Challenge; TCR Champion; 2023; With: Robert Wickens	Succeeded by Chris Miller; Mikey Taylor
Preceded by Chris Miller; Mikey Taylor	Michelin Pilot Challenge; TCR Champion; 2025	Succeeded by Incumbent
