= 2019 GT4 America Series =

The 2019 Pirelli GT4 America Series was the inaugural season of the GT4 America Series. It took over the GTS class of the Pirelli World Challenge, which adopted global GT4 technical regulations in 2018, and it is a Blancpain GT World Challenge America support series. GT4 America Series is split into a Sprint series, which features 50-minute races with one driver per car, and a SprintX series, which features one-hour races with two drivers per car and a mandatory driver change during Pit stops. Also East and West regional championships are awarded. The season began on 2 March in Austin and ended on 20 October in Las Vegas.

== Calendar ==
At the annual press conference during the 2018 24 Hours of Spa on 27 July, the Stéphane Ratel Organisation announced the first draft of the 2019 calendar. The date for the season opening weekend in Austin was confirmed on 15 August. Finalized schedules were announced on 29 September. An official announcement, concerning the races at Las Vegas Motor Speedway that carry the 'Grand Finale' name, is forthcoming.

=== SprintX ===
Round	Circuit	Date	Series
1	(United States) Circuit of the Americas, Elroy, Texas	2–3 March	East / West
2	(United States) WeatherTech Raceway Laguna Seca, Monterey, California	30–31 March	West
3	(United States) Virginia International Raceway, Alton, Virginia	27–28 April	East
4	(Canada) Canadian Tire Motorsport Park, Bowmanville, Ontario	18–19 May	East
5	(United States) Sonoma Raceway, Sonoma, California	8–9 June	West
6	(United States) Portland International Raceway, Portland, Oregon	13–14 July	West
7	(United States) Watkins Glen International, Watkins Glen, New York	31 August–1 September	East
8	(United States) Road America, Elkhart Lake, Wisconsin	21–22 September	East
9	(United States) Las Vegas Motor Speedway, Las Vegas, Nevada	19–20 October	West

The round at Laguna Seca only counts towards GT4 America West points and not towards SprintX.

=== Sprint ===
Round	Circuit	Date
1	(United States) St. Petersburg Street Circuit, St. Petersburg, Florida	9–10 March
2	(United States) Long Beach Street Circuit, Long Beach, California	14 April
3	(United States) Virginia International Raceway, Alton, Virginia	27–28 April
4	(Canada) Canadian Tire Motorsport Park, Bowmanville, Ontario	18–19 May
5	(United States) Sonoma Raceway, Sonoma, California	8–9 June
6	(United States) Watkins Glen International, Watkins Glen, New York	31 August–1 September
7	(United States) Road America, Elkhart Lake, Wisconsin	21–22 September
8	(United States) Las Vegas Motor Speedway, Las Vegas, Nevada	19–20 October

== Entry list ==
=== SprintX ===
Team	Car	No.	Drivers	Class		Rounds
Team	Car	No.	Drivers	Driver	Series	Rounds
(United States) GMG Racing	Audi R8 LMS GT4	2	(United States) Jason Bell	PA	SX	1, 7–8
(United States) GMG Racing	Audi R8 LMS GT4	2	(United States) Alec Udell	PA	SX	1, 8
(United States) GMG Racing	Audi R8 LMS GT4	2	(United States) Andrew Davis	PA	SX	7
(United States) GMG Racing	Audi R8 LMS GT4	2	(United States) Jason Bell	Am	SX	5
(United States) GMG Racing	Audi R8 LMS GT4	2	(United States) James Sofronas	Am	SX	5
(United States) GMG Racing	Porsche 718 Cayman GT4 Clubsport	2	(United States) James Sofronas	Am	SX	8
(United States) GMG Racing	Porsche 718 Cayman GT4 Clubsport	2	(United States) Jason Bell	Am	SX	8
(United States) GMG Racing	Audi R8 LMS GT4	04	(United States) CJ Moses	Am	SX	3, 7
(United States) GMG Racing	Audi R8 LMS GT4	04	(United States) James Sofronas	Am	SX	3, 7
(United States) Epic Motorsports	BMW M4 GT4	3	(United States) James Clay	Am	East	1, 3–4, 7
(United States) Epic Motorsports	BMW M4 GT4	3	(United States) Randy Mueller	Am	East	1, 3–4, 7
(United States) USRD	Ginetta G55 GT4	5	(United States) Jeff Bader	PA	West	1–2, 5, 9
(United States) USRD	Ginetta G55 GT4	5	(United States) Casey Dennis	PA	West	1–2, 5, 9
(United States) USRD	Audi R8 LMS GT4	5	(United States) Casey Dennis	PA	West	6
(United States) USRD	Audi R8 LMS GT4	5	(United States) Jeff Bader	PA	West	6
(United States) USRD	Ginetta G55 GT4	15	(United States) James Li	PA	West	6
(United States) USRD	Ginetta G55 GT4	15	(United States) Will Wattanawongkiri	PA	West	6
(United States) USRD	Audi R8 LMS GT4	15	(United States) Jean-Francois Brunot	PA	West	9
(United States) USRD	Audi R8 LMS GT4	15	(United States) Cody Kishel	PA	West	9
(United States) Motorsports USA	Maserati GranTurismo MC GT4	8	(United States) Jerold Lowe	PA	SX	6
(United States) Motorsports USA	Maserati GranTurismo MC GT4	8	(United States) Michael McAleenan	PA	SX	6
(United States) Auto Technic Racing	BMW M4 GT4	16	(United States) John Allen	Am	SX	All
(United States) Auto Technic Racing	BMW M4 GT4	16	(United States) Kris Wilson	Am	SX	All
(United States) TRG - The Racers Group	Porsche 718 Cayman GT4 Clubsport	17	(United States) Jim Rappaport	Am	West	All
(United States) TRG - The Racers Group	Porsche 718 Cayman GT4 Clubsport	17	(United States) Derek DeBoer	Am	West	All
(United States) TRG - The Racers Group	Porsche 718 Cayman GT4 Clubsport	17	(United States) Derek DeBoer	Am	East	3–4, 8
(United States) TRG - The Racers Group	Porsche 718 Cayman GT4 Clubsport	17	(United States) Sean Gibbons	Am	East	3–4, 8
(United States) TRG - The Racers Group	Porsche 718 Cayman GT4 Clubsport	67	(United States) Chris Bellomo	Am	West	All
(United States) TRG - The Racers Group	Porsche 718 Cayman GT4 Clubsport	67	(United States) Kevin Woods	Am	West	All
(United States) Stephen Cameron Racing	BMW M4 GT4	19	(United States) Greg Liefooghe	PA	SX	All
(United States) Stephen Cameron Racing	BMW M4 GT4	19	(United States) Sean Quinlan	PA	SX	All
(United States) Stephen Cameron Racing	BMW M4 GT4	19	(United States) Sean Quinlan	PA	West	2
(United States) Stephen Cameron Racing	BMW M4 GT4	19	(United States) Greg Liefooghe	PA	West	2
(United States) Stephen Cameron Racing	BMW M4 GT4	190	(United States) Ari Balogh	PA	SX	7
(United States) Stephen Cameron Racing	BMW M4 GT4	190	(United States) Tom Dyer	PA	SX	7
(United States) Flying Lizard Motorsports	Porsche 718 Cayman GT4 Clubsport	21	(United States) Michael Dinan	PA	SX	1, 3, 6–9
(United States) Flying Lizard Motorsports	Porsche 718 Cayman GT4 Clubsport	21	(United States) Robby Foley	PA	SX	1, 3, 6–9
(United States) Flying Lizard Motorsports	Porsche 718 Cayman GT4 Clubsport	35	(United States) Seth Neiman	Am	SX	1
(United States) Precision Driving Tech	BMW M4 GT4	22	(Serbia) Marko Radisic	PA	East	1, 3
(United States) Precision Driving Tech	BMW M4 GT4	22	(Canada) Karl Wittmer	PA	East	1, 3
(United States) Ian Lacy Racing	Ginetta G55 GT4	24	(United States) Frank Gannett	Am	West	1
(United States) Ian Lacy Racing	Ginetta G55 GT4	24	(United States) Drew Staveley	Am	West	1
(United States) Ian Lacy Racing	Ford Mustang GT4	24	(United States) Frank Gannett	PA	East	4, 7–8
(United States) Ian Lacy Racing	Ford Mustang GT4	24	(Canada) Karl Wittmer	PA	East	4, 7–8
(United States) Ian Lacy Racing	Ford Mustang GT4	24	(United States) Frank Gannett	Am	West	5–6
(United States) Ian Lacy Racing	Ford Mustang GT4	24	(United States) Drew Staveley	Am	West	5–6
(United States) KRÜGSPEED	Ginetta G55 GT4	27	(United States) Anthony Geraci	PA	East	1, 3–4
(United States) KRÜGSPEED	Ginetta G55 GT4	27	(United States) Elivan Goulart	PA	East	1, 3–4
(United States) KRÜGSPEED	McLaren 570S GT4	27	(United States) Elivan Goulart	PA	East	7–8
(United States) KRÜGSPEED	McLaren 570S GT4	27	(United States) Anthony Geraci	PA	East	7–8
(Canada) ST Racing	BMW M4 GT4	28	(United States) Harry Gottsacker	PA	West	All
(Canada) ST Racing	BMW M4 GT4	28	(United States) Jon Miller	PA	West	All
(Canada) ST Racing	BMW M4 GT4	38	(Canada) Samantha Tan	PA	West	All
(Canada) ST Racing	BMW M4 GT4	38	(United States) Jason Wolfe	PA	West	All
(United States) Classic BMW	BMW M4 GT4	29	(United Kingdom) Stevan McAleer	PA	East	All
(United States) Classic BMW	BMW M4 GT4	29	(United States) Justin Raphael	PA	East	All
(United States) Classic BMW	BMW M4 GT4	92	(United States) Toby Grahovec	PA	East	1
(United States) Classic BMW	BMW M4 GT4	92	(United States) Chris Ohmacht	PA	East	1
(United States) Classic BMW	BMW M4 GT4	92	(United States) Chris Ohmacht	PA	SX	3–4, 7–9
(United States) Classic BMW	BMW M4 GT4	92	(United States) Toby Grahovec	PA	SX	3–4, 7–9
(United States) Classic BMW	BMW M4 GT4	254	(United States) Ray Mason	Am	East	1
(United States) Classic BMW	BMW M4 GT4	254	(United States) Jeff Sexton	Am	East	1
(United States) Bodymotion Racing	Porsche 718 Cayman GT4 Clubsport	31	(United States) Al Carter	Am	East	1
(United States) Bodymotion Racing	Porsche 718 Cayman GT4 Clubsport	31	(United States) Sean Gibbons	Am	East	1
(United States) / Kelly-Moss Road & Race (Note: Car Nos. 32 and 81 entered as Kelly-Moss Road & Race and car No. 44 entered as Kelly-Moss/Photon Motorsports.); (United States) / Kelly-Moss/Photon Motorsports	Porsche Cayman GT4 Clubsport MR	32	(United States) Stuart Briscoe	PA	East	1
(United States) / Kelly-Moss Road & Race; (United States) / Kelly-Moss/Photon Motorsports	Porsche Cayman GT4 Clubsport MR	32	(United States) Andrew Davis	PA	East	1
(United States) / Kelly-Moss Road & Race; (United States) / Kelly-Moss/Photon Motorsports	Porsche 718 Cayman GT4 Clubsport	32	(United States) Andrew Davis	PA	East	3
(United States) / Kelly-Moss Road & Race; (United States) / Kelly-Moss/Photon Motorsports	Porsche 718 Cayman GT4 Clubsport	32	(United States) Stuart Briscoe	PA	East	3
(United States) / Kelly-Moss Road & Race; (United States) / Kelly-Moss/Photon Motorsports	Audi R8 LMS GT4	44	(United States) Eric Palmer	Am	East	1, 3–4, 8
(United States) / Kelly-Moss Road & Race; (United States) / Kelly-Moss/Photon Motorsports	Audi R8 LMS GT4	44	(United States) Greg Palmer	Am	East	1, 3–4, 8
(United States) / Kelly-Moss Road & Race; (United States) / Kelly-Moss/Photon Motorsports	Audi R8 LMS GT4	81	(United States) Andrew Davis	PA	East	8
(United States) / Kelly-Moss Road & Race; (United States) / Kelly-Moss/Photon Motorsports	Audi R8 LMS GT4	81	(United States) Dan Weyland	PA	East	8
(United States) Doghouse Performance	Audi R8 LMS GT4	33	(United States) Andy Pilgrim	PA	East	1, 3
(United States) Doghouse Performance	Audi R8 LMS GT4	33	(United States) Adam Poland	PA	East	1, 3
(United States) Murillo Racing	Mercedes-AMG GT4	34	(United States) Matt Fassnacht	Am	East	1, 3–4, 7–8
(United States) Murillo Racing	Mercedes-AMG GT4	34	(United States) Christian Szymczak	Am	East	1, 3–4, 7–8
(United States) Murillo Racing	Mercedes-AMG GT4	34	(United States) Christian Szymczak	PA	West	5–6
(United States) Murillo Racing	Mercedes-AMG GT4	34	(United States) Kenny Murillo	PA	West	5–6
(United States) Andretti Autosport	McLaren 570S GT4	36	(United States) Jarett Andretti	Am	SX	1, 3
(United States) Andretti Autosport	McLaren 570S GT4	36	(Canada) Karl Thomson	Am	SX	1, 3
(United States) Andretti Autosport	McLaren 570S GT4	36	(United States) Jarett Andretti	PA	SX	5–9
(United States) Andretti Autosport	McLaren 570S GT4	36	(United States) Colin Mullan	PA	SX	5–7, 9
(United States) Andretti Autosport	McLaren 570S GT4	36	(United States) David Donohue	PA	SX	8
(United States) RS 1	Porsche Cayman GT4 Clubsport MR	37	(United States) Charlie Bellarudo	PA	SX	7
(United States) RS 1	Porsche Cayman GT4 Clubsport MR	37	(Belgium) Jan Heylen	PA	SX	7
(United States) Rearden Racing	Audi R8 LMS GT4	43	(United States) Sarah Cattaneo	PA	West	1, 5–6, 9
(United States) Rearden Racing	Audi R8 LMS GT4	43	(United States) Owen Trinkler	PA	West	1, 5–6, 9
(United States) Rearden Racing	Mercedes-AMG GT4	64	(United States) Anthony Lazzaro	Am	West	9
(United States) Rearden Racing	Mercedes-AMG GT4	64	(Russia) Dmitri Novikov	Am	West	9
(United States) Rearden Racing	Audi R8 LMS GT4	91	(United States) Jeff Burton	Am	West	1–2, 6, 9
(United States) Rearden Racing	Audi R8 LMS GT4	91	(United States) Vesko Kozarov	Am	West	1–2, 6, 9
(United States) Rearden Racing	Audi R8 LMS GT4	91	(United States) Vesko Kozarov	Am	SX	3, 7
(United States) Rearden Racing	Audi R8 LMS GT4	91	(United States) Jeff Burton	Am	SX	3, 7
(United States) Nolasport	Porsche 718 Cayman GT4 Clubsport	46	(United States) John Capestro-Dubets	Am	SX	1, 3, 5
(United States) Nolasport	Porsche 718 Cayman GT4 Clubsport	46	(United States) Mike Vess	Am	SX	1, 3, 5
(United States) Nolasport	Porsche Cayman GT4 Clubsport MR	46	(United States) Patrick Byrne	PA	East	7
(United States) Nolasport	Porsche Cayman GT4 Clubsport MR	46	(United States) Guy Cosmo	PA	East	7
(United States) Nolasport	Porsche 718 Cayman GT4 Clubsport	47	(United States) Jason Hart	PA	SX	All
(United States) Nolasport	Porsche 718 Cayman GT4 Clubsport	47	(United States) Matt Travis	PA	SX	All
(United States) Team Panoz Racing	Panoz Avezzano GT4	51	(United States) Preston Calvert	Am	SX	All
(United States) Team Panoz Racing	Panoz Avezzano GT4	51	(United States) Matt Keegan	Am	SX	All
(United States) Racers Edge Motorsports	SIN R1 GT4	54	(United States) Mark Pavan	Am	West	2
(United States) Racers Edge Motorsports	SIN R1 GT4	54	(United States) Bob Michaelian	Am	West	2
(United States) Racers Edge Motorsports	SIN R1 GT4	54	(United States) Bob Michaelian	PA	West	6
(United States) Racers Edge Motorsports	SIN R1 GT4	54	(United States) Ross Smith	PA	West	6
(United States) Racers Edge Motorsports	SIN R1 GT4	54	(Canada) Marco DiLeo	PA	West	9
(United States) Racers Edge Motorsports	SIN R1 GT4	54	(United States) Ross Smith	PA	West	9
(United States) KohR Motorsports	Ford Mustang GT4	55	(United States) Rich Golinello	PA	East	1, 3
(United States) KohR Motorsports	Ford Mustang GT4	55	(United States) Nate Stacy	PA	East	1, 3
(United States) Dexter Racing	Ginetta G55 GT4	63	(United States) Ryan Dexter	PA	West	6
(United States) Dexter Racing	Ginetta G55 GT4	63	(United States) Warren Dexter	PA	West	6
(United States) Dexter Racing	Ginetta G55 GT4	63	(United States) Warren Dexter	PA	SX	7
(United States) Dexter Racing	Ginetta G55 GT4	63	(United States) Ben Anderson	PA	SX	7
(United States) BGB Motorsports Group	Porsche Cayman GT4 Clubsport MR	69	(Canada) Tom Collingwood	Am	East	1
(United States) BGB Motorsports Group	Porsche Cayman GT4 Clubsport MR	69	(United States) John Tecce	Am	East	1
(United States) BGB Motorsports Group	Porsche 718 Cayman GT4 Clubsport	69	(United States) John Tecce	Am	East	3–4, 7–8
(United States) BGB Motorsports Group	Porsche 718 Cayman GT4 Clubsport	69	(Canada) Tom Collingwood	Am	East	3–4, 7–8
(United States) BGB Motorsports Group	Porsche 718 Cayman GT4 Clubsport	69	(Canada) Tom Collingwood	Am	SX	9
(United States) BGB Motorsports Group	Porsche 718 Cayman GT4 Clubsport	69	(United States) John Teece	Am	SX	9
(United States) Park Place Motorsports	Porsche 718 Cayman GT4 Clubsport	77	(United States) Alan Brynjolfsson	PA	East	1, 4, 7–8
(United States) Park Place Motorsports	Porsche 718 Cayman GT4 Clubsport	77	(United States) Trent Hindman	PA	East	1, 4, 7–8
(United States) Park Place Motorsports	Porsche 718 Cayman GT4 Clubsport	77	(United States) Trent Hindman	PA	West	9
(United States) Park Place Motorsports	Porsche 718 Cayman GT4 Clubsport	77	(United States) Alan Brynjolfsson	PA	West	9
(United States) Park Place Motorsports	Porsche Cayman GT4 Clubsport MR	77	(United States) Trent Hindman	PA	East	3
(United States) Park Place Motorsports	Porsche Cayman GT4 Clubsport MR	77	(United States) Alan Brynjolfsson	PA	East	3
(United States) RENNtech Motorsports	Mercedes-AMG GT4	89	(United States) Parker Chase	PA	East	1
(United States) RENNtech Motorsports	Mercedes-AMG GT4	89	(Germany) Reinhold Renger	PA	East	1
(United States) RENNtech Motorsports	Mercedes-AMG GT4	89	(United States) Patrick Byrne	PA	East	8
(United States) RENNtech Motorsports	Mercedes-AMG GT4	89	(United States) Guy Cosmo	PA	East	8
(United States) RENNtech Motorsports	Mercedes-AMG GT4	89	(United States) Guy Cosmo	PA	West	9
(United States) RENNtech Motorsports	Mercedes-AMG GT4	89	(United States) Patrick Byrne	PA	West	9
(United States) RHC Jorgensen / Strom by Strom Motorsports	BMW M4 GT4	452	(United States) Daren Jorgensen	Am	West	2
(United States) RHC Jorgensen / Strom by Strom Motorsports	BMW M4 GT4	452	(United States) Brett Strom	Am	West	2
(United States) Ramsey Racing/EXR Team by Premat	Mercedes-AMG GT4	592	(France) Alexandre Prémat	PA	SX	6
(United States) Ramsey Racing/EXR Team by Premat	Mercedes-AMG GT4	592	(United States) Mark Ramsey	PA	SX	6

Icon	Class
Drivers
PA	Pro-Am Cup
Am	Am Cup
Series
SX	SprintX
East	East
West	West

=== Sprint ===
Team	Car	No.	Drivers	Class	Rounds
(United States) GMG Racing	Audi R8 LMS GT4	2	(United States) Jason Bell	Am	1
(United States) GMG Racing	Porsche 718 Cayman GT4 Clubsport	2	(United States) Jason Bell	Am	2–8
(United States) GMG Racing	Audi R8 LMS GT4	04	(United States) CJ Moses	Am	1–2
(United States) GMG Racing	Audi R8 LMS GT4	14	(United States) James Sofronas	Pro	2
(United States) Park Place Motorsports	Porsche 718 Cayman GT4 Clubsport	7	(United States) Alan Brynjolfsson	Am	All
(United States) Blackdog Speed Shop	McLaren 570S GT4	10	(United States) Michael Cooper	Pro	All
(United States) Blackdog Speed Shop	McLaren 570S GT4	11	(United States) Tony Gaples	Am	All
(United States) Ian Lacy Racing	Ford Mustang GT4	12	(United States) Ian Lacy	Pro	1
(United States) Ian Lacy Racing	Ford Mustang GT4	12	(United States) Drew Staveley	Am	2–8
(United States) Ian Lacy Racing	Ford Mustang GT4	24	(United States) Frank Gannett	Am	All
(United States) Andretti Autosport	McLaren 570S GT4	18	(United States) Jarett Andretti	Am	1–4
(United States) Andretti Autosport	McLaren 570S GT4	18	(United States) Jarett Andretti	Pro	5–8
(United States) Stephen Cameron Racing	BMW M4 GT4	19	(United States) Sean Quinlan	Am	3–8
(United States) Stephen Cameron Racing	BMW M4 GT4	88	(United States) Henry Schmitt	Am	3, 5
(United States) Stephen Cameron Racing	BMW M4 GT4	190	(United States) Ari Balogh	Am	6
(United States) CRP Racing	Porsche Cayman GT4 Clubsport MR	20	(Australia) Matt Brabham	Pro	2, 5, 8
(United States) Flying Lizard Motorsports	Porsche 718 Cayman GT4 Clubsport	21	(United States) Michael Dinan	Am	1–2
(United States) Flying Lizard Motorsports	Porsche 718 Cayman GT4 Clubsport	210	(United States) Michael Dinan	Am	3, 7–8
(United States) Flying Lizard Motorsports	Audi R8 LMS GT4	30	(United States) Erin Vogel	Am	5
(United States) Precision Driving Tech	BMW M4 GT4	22	(Serbia) Marko Radisic	Am	1–3, 5–7
(United States) Classic BMW	BMW M4 GT4	26	(United States) Toby Grahovec	Pro	5
(United States) Classic BMW	BMW M4 GT4	26	(United Kingdom) Stevan McAleer	Pro	7
(United States) Classic BMW	BMW M4 GT4	92	(United States) Chris Ohmacht	Am	3
(Canada) ST Racing	BMW M4 GT4	38	(Canada) Samantha Tan	Am	2
(United States) PF Racing	Ford Mustang GT4	40	(United States) James Pesek	Pro	1, 8
(United States) PF Racing	Ford Mustang GT4	41	(United States) Jade Buford	Pro	1, 8
(United States) PF Racing	Ford Mustang GT4	42	(United States) Shane Lewis	Pro	8
(United States) Kelly-Moss/Photon Motorsports	Audi R8 LMS GT4	44	(United States) Greg Palmer	Am	3
(United States) Team Panoz Racing	Panoz Avezzano GT4	50	(United States) Ian James	Pro	All
(United States) Team Panoz Racing	Panoz Avezzano GT4	51	(United States) Preston Calvert	Am	1
(United States) Team Panoz Racing	Panoz Avezzano GT4	51	(United States) Matt Keegan	Am	2
(United States) Murillo Racing	Mercedes-AMG GT4	53	(United States) Matt Fassnacht	Am	3–4
(United States) Racers Edge Motorsports	SIN R1 GT4	54	(United States) Bob Michaelian	Am	2
(United States) KohR Motorsports	Ford Mustang GT4	55	(United States) Nate Stacy	Pro	4
(United States) KPR	McLaren 570S GT4	62	(United States) Mark Klenin	Am	All
(United States) TRG - The Racers Group	Porsche 718 Cayman GT4 Clubsport	66	(United States) Spencer Pumpelly	Pro	All
(United States) BGB Motorsports Group	Porsche Cayman GT4 Clubsport MR	69	(Canada) Tom Collingwood	Am	1
(United States) BGB Motorsports Group	Porsche Cayman GT4 Clubsport MR	169	(Canada) Tom Collingwood	Am	3–4
(United States) BGB Motorsports Group	Porsche 718 Cayman GT4 Clubsport	169	(Canada) Tom Collingwood	Am	6–7
(United States) Marco Polo Motorsports	KTM X-Bow GT4	71	(United States) Nicolai Elghanayan	Pro	1–5
(United States) Robinson Racing	Chevrolet Camaro GT4.R	72	(United States) Shane Lewis	Pro	1–7
(United States) Robinson Racing	Chevrolet Camaro GT4.R	74	(United States) Gar Robinson	Pro	1–7
(United States) Rearden Racing	Mercedes-AMG GT4	64	(Russia) Dmitry Novikov	Am	8
(United States) Rearden Racing	BMW M4 GT4	80	(Russia) Dmitry Novikov	Am	3, 5
(United States) Rearden Racing	Audi R8 LMS GT4	91	(United States) Jeff Burton	Am	3, 5–6
(United States) McCann Racing	Audi R8 LMS GT4	82	(United States) Michael McCann	Pro	3, 6–7
(United States) K2R Motorsports	Porsche 718 Cayman GT4 Clubsport	83	(United States) Kevan Millstein	Am	6–8
(United States) JCR Motorsports	Maserati GranTurismo MC GT4	99	(United States) Jeff Courtney	Am	6, 8

Icon	Class
Pro	Pro Cup
Am	Am Cup

== Race results ==
Bold indicates overall winner.

=== SprintX ===
Round		Circuit	Pole position	SprintX		East		West	
Round		Circuit	Pole position	Pro-Am Winners	Am Winners	Pro-Am Winners	Am Winners	Pro-Am Winners	Am Winners
1	R1	(United States) Austin	(United States) No. 47 Nolasport	**(United States) No. 47 Nolasport**	(United States) No. 51 Team Panoz Racing	(United States) No. 77 Park Place Motorsports	(United States) No. 31 Bodymotion Racing	(Canada) No. 28 ST Racing	(United States) No. 91 Rearden Racing
1	R1	(United States) Austin	(United States) Jason Hart (United States) Matt Travis	**(United States) Jason Hart** **(United States) Matt Travis**	(United States) Preston Calvert (United States) Matt Keegan	(United States) Alan Brynjolfsson (United States) Trent Hindman	(United States) Al Carter (United States) Sean Gibbons	(United States) Harry Gottsacker (United States) Jon Miller	(United States) Jeff Burton (United States) Vesko Kozarov
1	R2	(United States) Austin	(United States) No. 47 Nolasport	(United States) No. 47 Nolasport	(United States) No. 36 Andretti Autosport	**(United States) No. 77 Park Place Motorsports**	(United States) No. 34 Murillo Racing	(Canada) No. 28 ST Racing	(United States) No. 67 TRG - The Racers Group
1	R2	(United States) Austin	(United States) Jason Hart (United States) Matt Travis	(United States) Jason Hart (United States) Matt Travis	(United States) Jarett Andretti (Canada) Karl Thomson	**(United States) Alan Brynjolfsson** **(United States) Trent Hindman**	(United States) Matt Fassnacht (United States) Christian Szymczak	(United States) Harry Gottsacker (United States) Jon Miller	(United States) Chris Bellomo (United States) Kevin Woods
2	R1	(United States) Laguna Seca	(United States) No. 17 TRG - The Racers Group	Did not participate				**(United States) No. 19 Stephen Cameron Racing**	(United States) No. 91 Rearden Racing
2	R1	(United States) Laguna Seca	(United States) Derek DeBoer (United States) Jim Rappaport	Did not participate				**(United States) Greg Liefooghe** **(United States) Sean Quinlan**	(United States) Jeff Burton (United States) Vesko Kozarov
2	R2	(United States) Laguna Seca	(United States) No. 19 Stephen Cameron Racing	Did not participate				**(Canada) No. 28 ST Racing**	(United States) No. 67 TRG - The Racers Group
2	R2	(United States) Laguna Seca	(United States) Greg Liefooghe (United States) Sean Quinlan	Did not participate				**(United States) Harry Gottsacker** **(United States) Jon Miller**	(United States) Chris Bellomo (United States) Kevin Woods
3	R1	(United States) Virginia	(United States) No. 16 Auto Technic Racing	(United States) No. 47 Nolasport	(United States) No. 91 Rearden Racing	**(United States) No. 29 Classic BMW**	(United States) No. 3 Epic Motorsports	Did not participate	
3	R1	(United States) Virginia	(United States) John Allen (United States) Kris Wilson	(United States) Jason Hart (United States) Matt Travis	(United States) Jeff Burton (United States) Vesko Kozarov	**(United Kingdom) Stevan McAleer** **(United States) Justin Raphael**	(United States) James Clay (United States) Randy Mueller	Did not participate	
3	R2	(United States) Virginia	(United States) No. 47 Nolasport	**(United States) No. 47 Nolasport**	(United States) No. 91 Rearden Racing	(United States) No. 22 Precision Driving Tech	(United States) No. 69 BGB Motorsports Group	Did not participate	
3	R2	(United States) Virginia	(United States) Jason Hart (United States) Matt Travis	**(United States) Jason Hart** **(United States) Matt Travis**	(United States) Jeff Burton (United States) Vesko Kozarov	(Serbia) Marko Radisic (Canada) Karl Wittmer	(Canada) Tom Collingwood (United States) John Tecce	Did not participate	
4	R1	(Canada) Mosport	(United States) No. 34 Murillo Racing	**(United States) No. 47 Nolasport**	(United States) No. 36 Andretti Autosport	(United States) No. 27 KRÜGSPEED	(United States) No. 3 Epic Motorsports	Did not participate	
4	R1	(Canada) Mosport	(United States) Matt Fassnacht (United States) Christian Szymczak	**(United States) Jason Hart** **(United States) Matt Travis**	(United States) Jarett Andretti (Canada) Karl Thomson	(United States) Anthony Geraci (United States) Elivan Goulart	(United States) James Clay (United States) Randy Mueller	Did not participate	
4	R2	(Canada) Mosport	(United States) No. 34 Murillo Racing	(United States) No. 19 Stephen Cameron Racing	(United States) No. 51 Team Panoz Racing	(United States) No. 27 KRÜGSPEED	**(United States) No. 34 Murillo Racing**	Did not participate	
4	R2	(Canada) Mosport	(United States) Matt Fassnacht (United States) Christian Szymczak	(United States) Greg Liefooghe (United States) Sean Quinlan	(United States) Preston Calvert (United States) Matt Keegan	(United States) Anthony Geraci (United States) Elivan Goulart	**(United States) Matt Fassnacht** **(United States) Christian Szymczak**	Did not participate	
5	R1	(United States) Sonoma	(United States) No. 34 Murillo Racing	(United States) No. 19 Stephen Cameron Racing	(United States) No. 2 GMG Racing	Did not participate		(United States) No. 34 Murillo Racing	**(United States) No. 91 Rearden Racing**
5	R1	(United States) Sonoma	(United States) Kenny Murillo (United States) Christian Szymczak	(United States) Greg Liefooghe (United States) Sean Quinlan	(United States) Jason Bell (United States) James Sofronas	Did not participate		(United States) Kenny Murillo (United States) Christian Szymczak	**(United States) Jeff Burton** **(United States) Vesko Kozarov**
5	R2	(United States) Sonoma	(United States) No. 47 Nolasport	(United States) No. 36 Andretti Autosport	(United States) No. 51 Team Panoz Racing	Did not participate		**(United States) No. 34 Murillo Racing**	(United States) No. 91 Rearden Racing
5	R2	(United States) Sonoma	(United States) Jason Hart (United States) Matt Travis	(United States) Jarett Andretti (United States) Colin Mullan	(United States) Preston Calvert (United States) Matt Keegan	Did not participate		**(United States) Kenny Murillo** **(United States) Christian Szymczak**	(United States) Jeff Burton (United States) Vesko Kozarov
6	R1	(United States) Portland	(United States) No. 34 Murillo Racing	(United States) No. 19 Stephen Cameron Racing	(United States) No. 51 Team Panoz Racing	Did not participate		**(United States) No. 34 Murillo Racing**	(United States) No. 24 Ian Lacy Racing
6	R1	(United States) Portland	(United States) Kenny Murillo (United States) Christian Szymczak	(United States) Greg Liefooghe (United States) Sean Quinlan	(United States) Preston Calvert (United States) Matt Keegan	Did not participate		**(United States) Kenny Murillo** **(United States) Christian Szymczak**	(United States) Frank Gannett (United States) Drew Staveley
6	R2	(United States) Portland	(United States) No. 24 Ian Lacy Racing	(United States) No. 47 Nolasport	(United States) No. 51 Team Panoz Racing	Did not participate		**(Canada) No. 28 ST Racing**	(United States) No. 91 Rearden Racing
6	R2	(United States) Portland	(United States) Frank Gannett (United States) Drew Staveley	(United States) Jason Hart (United States) Matt Travis	(United States) Preston Calvert (United States) Matt Keegan	Did not participate		**(United States) Harry Gottsacker** **(United States) Jon Miller**	(United States) Jeff Burton (United States) Vesko Kozarov
7	R1	(United States) Watkins Glen	(United States) No. 91 Rearden Racing	**(United States) No. 19 Stephen Cameron Racing**	(United States) No. 91 Rearden Racing	(United States) No. 77 Park Place Motorsports	(United States) No. 34 Murillo Racing	Did not participate	
7	R1	(United States) Watkins Glen	(United States) Jeff Burton (United States) Vesko Kozarov	**(United States) Greg Liefooghe** **(United States) Sean Quinlan**	(United States) Jeff Burton (United States) Vesko Kozarov	(United States) Alan Brynjolfsson (United States) Trent Hindman	(United States) Matt Fassnacht (United States) Christian Szymczak	Did not participate	
7	R2	(United States) Watkins Glen	(United States) No. 24 Ian Lacy Racing	(United States) No. 19 Stephen Cameron Racing	(United States) No. 51 Team Panoz Racing	(United States) No. 77 Park Place Motorsports	**(United States) No. 34 Murillo Racing**	Did not participate	
7	R2	(United States) Watkins Glen	(United States) Frank Gannett (Canada) Karl Wittmer	(United States) Greg Liefooghe (United States) Sean Quinlan	(United States) Preston Calvert (United States) Matt Keegan	(United States) Alan Brynjolfsson (United States) Trent Hindman	**(United States) Matt Fassnacht** **(United States) Christian Szymczak**	Did not participate	
8	R1	(United States) Road America	(United States) No. 16 Auto Technic Racing	(United States) No. 19 Stephen Cameron Racing	(United States) No. 51 Team Panoz Racing	(United States) No. 89 RENNtech Motorsports	**(United States) No. 34 Murillo Racing**	Did not participate	
8	R1	(United States) Road America	(United States) John Allen (United States) Kris Wilson	(United States) Greg Liefooghe (United States) Sean Quinlan	(United States) Preston Calvert (United States) Matt Keegan	(United States) Patrick Byrne (United States) Guy Cosmo	**(United States) Matt Fassnacht** **(United States) Christian Szymczak**	Did not participate	
8	R2	(United States) Road America	(United States) No. 89 RENNtech Motorsports	(United States) No. 47 Nolasport	(United States) No. 51 Team Panoz Racing	**(United States) No. 77 Park Place Motorsports**	(United States) No. 34 Murillo Racing	Did not participate	
8	R2	(United States) Road America	(United States) Patrick Byrne (United States) Guy Cosmo	(United States) Jason Hart (United States) Matt Travis	(United States) Preston Calvert (United States) Matt Keegan	**(United States) Alan Brynjolfsson** **(United States) Trent Hindman**	(United States) Matt Fassnacht (United States) Christian Szymczak	Did not participate	
9	R1	(United States) Las Vegas	(United States) No. 91 Rearden Racing	**(United States) No. 36 Andretti Autosport**	(United States) No. 51 Team Panoz Racing	Did not participate		(United States) No. 77 Park Place Motorsports	(United States) No. 91 Rearden Racing
9	R1	(United States) Las Vegas	(United States) Jeff Burton (United States) Vesko Kozarov	**(United States) Jarett Andretti** **(United States) Colin Mullan**	(United States) Preston Calvert (United States) Matt Keegan	Did not participate		(United States) Alan Brynjolfsson (United States) Trent Hindman	(United States) Jeff Burton (United States) Vesko Kozarov
9	R2	(United States) Las Vegas	(United States) No. 19 Stephen Cameron Racing	**(United States) No. 36 Andretti Autosport**	(United States) No. 2 GMG Racing	Did not participate		(Canada) No. 28 ST Racing	(United States) No. 17 TRG - The Racer's Group
9	R2	(United States) Las Vegas	(United States) Greg Liefooghe (United States) Sean Quinlan	**(United States) Jarett Andretti** **(United States) Colin Mullan**	(United States) Jason Bell (United States) James Sofronas	Did not participate		(United States) Harry Gottsacker (United States) Jon Miller	(United States) Derek DeBoer (United States) Jim Rappaport

=== Sprint ===
Round		Circuit	Pole position	Pro Winners	Am Winners
1	R1	(United States) St. Petersburg	(United States) No. 66 TRG - The Racers Group	**(United States) No. 50 Team Panoz Racing**	(United States) No. 7 Park Place Motorsports
1	R1	(United States) St. Petersburg	(United States) Spencer Pumpelly	**(United States) Ian James**	(United States) Alan Brynjolfsson
1	R2	(United States) St. Petersburg	(United States) No. 41 PF Racing	**(United States) No. 41 PF Racing**	(United States) No. 51 Team Panoz Racing
1	R2	(United States) St. Petersburg	(United States) Jade Buford	**(United States) Jade Buford**	(United States) Preston Calvert
2		(United States) Long Beach	(United States) No. 66 TRG - The Racers Group	**(United States) No. 66 TRG - The Racers Group**	(United States) No. 51 Team Panoz Racing
2		(United States) Long Beach	(United States) Spencer Pumpelly	**(United States) Spencer Pumpelly**	(United States) Matt Keegan
3	R1	(United States) Virginia	(United States) No. 66 TRG - The Racers Group	(United States) No. 10 Blackdog Speed Shop	**(United States) No. 53 Murillo Racing**
3	R1	(United States) Virginia	(United States) Spencer Pumpelly	(United States) Michael Cooper	**(United States) Matt Fassnacht**
3	R2	(United States) Virginia	(United States) No. 53 Murillo Racing	(United States) No. 74 Robinson Racing	**(United States) No. 53 Murillo Racing**
3	R2	(United States) Virginia	(United States) Matt Fassnacht	(United States) Gar Robinson	**(United States) Matt Fassnacht**
4	R1	(Canada) Mosport	(United States) No. 71 Marco Polo Motorsports	**(United States) No. 71 Marco Polo Motorsports**	(United States) No. 18 Andretti Autosport
4	R1	(Canada) Mosport	(United States) Nicolai Elghanayan	**(United States) Nicolai Elghanayan**	(United States) Jarett Andretti
4	R2	(Canada) Mosport	(United States) No. 66 TRG - The Racers Group	**(United States) No. 66 TRG - The Racers Group**	(United States) No. 18 Andretti Autosport
4	R2	(Canada) Mosport	(United States) Spencer Pumpelly	**(United States) Spencer Pumpelly**	(United States) Jarett Andretti
5	R1	(United States) Sonoma	(United States) No. 10 Blackdog Speed Shop	**(United States) No. 10 Blackdog Speed Shop**	(United States) No. 12 Ian Lacy Racing
5	R1	(United States) Sonoma	(United States) Michael Cooper	**(United States) Michael Cooper**	(United States) Drew Staveley
5	R2	(United States) Sonoma	(United States) No. 10 Blackdog Speed Shop	**(United States) No. 50 Team Panoz Racing**	(United States) No. 12 Ian Lacy Racing
5	R2	(United States) Sonoma	(United States) Michael Cooper	**(United States) Ian James**	(United States) Drew Staveley
6	R1	(United States) Watkins Glen	(United States) No. 18 Andretti Autosport	**(United States) No. 50 Team Panoz Racing**	(United States) No. 12 Ian Lacy Racing
6	R1	(United States) Watkins Glen	(United States) Jarett Andretti	**(United States) Ian James**	(United States) Drew Staveley
6	R2	(United States) Watkins Glen	(United States) No. 74 Robinson Racing	**(United States) No. 18 Andretti Autosport**	(United States) No. 99 JCR Motorsports
6	R2	(United States) Watkins Glen	(United States) Gar Robinson	**(United States) Jarett Andretti**	(United States) Jeff Courtney
7	R1	(United States) Road America	(United States) No. 72 Robinson Racing	**(United States) No. 10 Blackdog Speed Shop**	(United States) No. 12 Ian Lacy Racing
7	R1	(United States) Road America	(United States) Shane Lewis	**(United States) Michael Cooper**	(United States) Drew Staveley
7	R2	(United States) Road America	(United States) No. 10 Blackdog Speed Shop	**(United States) No. 10 Blackdog Speed Shop**	(United States) No. 7 Park Place Motorsports
7	R2	(United States) Road America	(United States) Michael Cooper	**(United States) Michael Cooper**	(United States) Alan Brynjolfsson
8	R1	(United States) Las Vegas	(United States) No. 66 TRG - The Racers Group	**(United States) No. 50 Team Panoz Racing**	(United States) No. 12 Ian Lacy Racing
8	R1	(United States) Las Vegas	(United States) Spencer Pumpelly	**(United States) Ian James**	(United States) Drew Staveley
8	R2	(United States) Las Vegas	(United States) No. 10 Blackdog Speed Shop	**(United States) No. 10 Blackdog Speed Shop**	(United States) No. 12 Ian Lacy Racing
8	R2	(United States) Las Vegas	(United States) Michael Cooper	**(United States) Michael Cooper**	(United States) Drew Staveley

== Championship standings ==
Scoring system

Championship points are awarded for the first ten positions in each race. Entries are required to complete 75% of the winning car's race distance in order to be classified and earn points. Individual drivers are required to participate for a minimum of 25 minutes in order to earn championship points in any SprintX race.

Position	**1st**	**2nd**	**3rd**	**4th**	**5th**	**6th**	**7th**	**8th**	**9th**	**10th**
Points	25	18	15	12	10	8	6	4	2	1

=== Drivers' championships ===
==== SprintX ====
Pos.	Driver	Team	AUS (United States)		LAG (United States)		VIR (United States)		MOS (Canada)		SON (United States)		POR (United States)		WGL (United States)		ELK (United States)		LVS (United States)		Points
SprintX Pro-Am Cup
1	(United States) Greg Liefooghe (United States) Sean Quinlan	(United States) Stephen Cameron Racing	5	4	—N/a		2	4	2	1	1	4	1	3	1	1	1	2	4	**3**	309
2	(United States) Jason Hart (United States) Matt Travis	(United States) Nolasport	**1**	**1**	—N/a		**1**	**1**	**1**	**5**	**3**	**3**	2	**1**	5	11	**3**	**1**	2	6	302
3	(United States) Toby Grahovec (United States) Chris Ohmacht	(United States) Classic BMW			—N/a		6	3	4	3					10	7	4	3	8	8	127
4	(United States) Michael Dinan (United States) Robby Foley	(United States) Flying Lizard Motorsports	4	2	—N/a		Ret	DNS					6	7	13	3	Ret	5	Ret	4	97
5	(United States) Jarett Andretti	(United States) Andretti Autosport			—N/a						2	2	Ret	Ret	14	DNS	Ret	DNS	**1**	1	94
5	(United States) Colin Mullan	(United States) Andretti Autosport			—N/a						2	2	Ret	Ret	14	DNS			**1**	1	94
6	(United States) Jason Bell	(United States) GMG Racing	2	8	—N/a										9	10	2	4			72
7	(United States) Alec Udell	(United States) GMG Racing	2	8	—N/a												2	4			60
7	(United States) Warren Dexter	(United States) Dexter Racing			—N/a								**4**	2	4	4					60
8	(France) Alexandre Prémat (United States) Mark Ramsey	(United States) Ramsey Racing/EXR Team by Premat			—N/a								7	5	6	2					50
9	(United States) Ryan Dexter	(United States) Dexter Racing			—N/a								**4**	2							33
10	(United States) Ari Balogh (United States) Tom Dyer	(United States) Stephen Cameron Racing			—N/a										3	5					28
11	(United States) Ben Anderson	(United States) Dexter Racing			—N/a										4	4					27
12	(United States) Andrew Davis	(United States) GMG Racing			—N/a										9	9					12
13	(United States) Charlie Bellaurdo (Belgium) Jan Heylen	(United States) RS1			—N/a										**8**	**12**					10
Drivers ineligible to score points
	(United States) Patrick Byrne (United States) Guy Cosmo	(United States) RENNtech Motorsports			—N/a														3	2	
	(Canada) Marco DiLeo (United States) Ross Smith	(United States) Racers Edge Motorsports			—N/a														10	11	
	(United States) David Donahue	(United States) Andretti Autosport			—N/a												Ret	DNS			
SprintX Am Cup
1	(United States) Preston Calvert (United States) Matt Keegan	(United States) Team Panoz Racing	3	7	—N/a		8	7	6	2	**Ret**	1	**3**	**4**	7	**6**	5	**6**	5	10	313
2	(United States) John Allen (United States) Kris Wilson	(United States) Auto Technic Racing	6	8	—N/a		**9**	5	5	4	5	**6**	5	6	11	8	**6**	7			230
3	(United States) James Sofronas	(United States) GMG Racing			—N/a		4	8			4	5			12	10			**7**	5	141
4	(United States) Jason Bell	(United States) GMG Racing			—N/a						4	5							**7**	5	86
5	(United States) Jeff Burton (United States) Vesko Kozarov	(United States) Rearden Racing			—N/a		3	2							**2**	DNS					75
6	(United States) John Capestro-Dubets (United States) Mike Vess	(United States) Nolasport	6	**6**	—N/a		5	**6**													63
7	(United States) Jarett Andretti (Canada) Karl Thomson	(United States) Andretti Autosport	**DSQ**	3	—N/a		7	Ret	**3**	**Ret**											62
8	(United States) CJ Moses	(United States) GMG Racing			—N/a		4	8							12	10					55
	(United States) Seth Neiman	(United States) Flying Lizard Motorsports	WD	WD	—N/a																
Drivers ineligible to score points
	(United States) Anthony Lazzaro (Russia) Dmitri Novikov	(United States) Rearden Racing			—N/a														6	9	
	(Canada) Tom Collingwood (United States) John Teece	(United States) BGB Motorsports Group			—N/a														9	**7**	
East Pro-Am Cup
1	(United Kingdom) Stevan McAleer (United States) Justin Raphael	(United States) Classic BMW	4	6	—N/a		1	**3**	3	8	—N/a				8	3	3	5	—N/a		167
2	(Canada) Karl Wittmer	(United States) Precision Driving Tech	5	7	—N/a		3	1			—N/a								—N/a		165
2	(Canada) Karl Wittmer	(United States) Ian Lacy Racing			—N/a				4	3	—N/a				3	**6**	4	4	—N/a		165
3	(United States) Alan Brynjolfsson (United States) Trent Hindman	(United States) Park Place Motorsports	1	**1**	—N/a		**Ret**	5	**Ret**	5	—N/a				**2**	2	Ret	1	—N/a		152
4	(United States) Anthony Geraci (United States) Elivan Goulart	(United States) KRÜGSPEED	Ret	9	—N/a		4	Ret	1	**2**	—N/a				Ret	DNS			—N/a		71
5	(United States) Frank Gannett	(United States) Ian Lacy Racing			—N/a				4	3	—N/a				3	**6**			—N/a		66
6	(Serbia) Marko Radisic	(United States) Precision Driving Tech	5	7	—N/a		3	1			—N/a								—N/a		63
7	(United States) Andy Pilgrim (United States) Adam Poland	(United States) Doghouse Performance	Ret	8	—N/a		8	2			—N/a								—N/a		42
8	(United States) Parker Chase (Germany) Reinhold Renger	(United States) RENNtech Motorsports	**2**	3	—N/a						—N/a								—N/a		36
9	(United States) Stuart Briscoe (United States) Andrew Davis	(United States) Kelly-Moss Road & Race	12	14	—N/a		5	6			—N/a								—N/a		34
10	(United States) Rich Golinello (United States) Nate Stacy	(United States) KohR Motorsports	3	4	—N/a		Ret	DNS			—N/a								—N/a		30
	(United States) Toby Grahovec (United States) Chris Ohmacht	(United States) Classic BMW	Ret	Ret	—N/a						—N/a								—N/a		
Drivers ineligible to score points
	(United States) Patrick Byrne (United States) Guy Cosmo	(United States) Nolasport			—N/a						—N/a				4	7			—N/a		
	(United States) Patrick Byrne (United States) Guy Cosmo	(United States) RENNtech Motorsports			—N/a						—N/a						**2**	**3**	—N/a		
	(United States) Drew Staveley	(United States) Ian Lacy Racing			—N/a						—N/a						4	4	—N/a		
East Am Cup
1	(United States) Matt Fassnacht (United States) Christian Szymczak	(United States) Murillo Racing	**10**	**2**	—N/a		**9**	**Ret**	**7**	**1**	—N/a				**1**	**1**	**1**	**2**	—N/a		184
2	(United States) Sean Gibbons	(United States) Bodymotion Racing	6	11	—N/a						—N/a								—N/a		169
2	(United States) Sean Gibbons	(United States) TRG - The Racers Group			—N/a		6	7	6	6	—N/a				6	4	6	6	—N/a		169
3	(Canada) Tom Collingwood (United States) John Tecce	(United States) BGB Motorsports Group	7	13	—N/a		7	4	5	7	—N/a				7	5	5	7	—N/a		156
4	(United States) Derek DeBoer	(United States) TRG - The Racers Group			—N/a		6	7	6	6	—N/a				6	4	6	6	—N/a		132
5	(United States) James Clay (United States) Randy Mueller	(United States) Epic Motorsports	8	5	—N/a		2	Ret	2	4	—N/a				5	8			—N/a		131
6	(United States) Eric Palmer (United States) Greg Palmer	(United States) Kelly-Moss/Photon Motorsports	11	12	—N/a		DNS	DNS	8	9	—N/a						Ret	8	—N/a		50
7	(United States) Al Carter	(United States) Bodymotion Racing	6	11	—N/a						—N/a								—N/a		37
8	(United States) Ray Mason (United States) Jeff Sexton	(United States) Classic BMW	9	10	—N/a						—N/a								—N/a		27
West Pro-Am Cup
1	(United States) Harry Gottsacker (United States) Jon Miller	(Canada) ST Racing	**2**	1	**5**	1	—N/a				3	2	2	**1**	—N/a				**3**	**1**	216
2	(Canada) Samantha Tan (United States) Jason Wolfe	(Canada) ST Racing	3	7	4	9	—N/a				7	**4**	3	4	—N/a				5	3	148
3	(United States) Jeff Bader (United States) Casey Dennis	(United States) USRD	6	4	2	5	—N/a				6	8	10	Ret	—N/a						96
4	(United States) Kenny Murillo (United States) Christian Szymczak	(United States) Murillo Racing					—N/a				**2**	1	**1**	5	—N/a						90
5	(United States) Sarah Cattaneo (United States) Owen Trinkler	(United States) Rearden Racing	7	**6**			—N/a				5	5			—N/a				4	8	87
6	(United States) Greg Liefooghe (United States) Sean Quinlan	(United States) Stephen Cameron Racing			1	**2**	—N/a								—N/a						43
7	(United States) Bob Michaelian (United States) Ross Smith	(United States) Racers Edge Motorsports					—N/a						6	7	—N/a						24
8	(United States) James Li (United States) Will Wattanawongkiri	(United States) USRD					—N/a						9	DNS	—N/a						10
Drivers ineligible to score points
	(United States) Alan Brynjolfsson (United States) Trent Hindman	(United States) Park Place Motorsports					—N/a								—N/a				1	2	
	(United States) Jean-Francois Brunot (United States) Cody Kishiel	(United States) USRD					—N/a								—N/a				7	6	
West Am Cup
1	(United States) Jeff Burton (United States) Vesko Kozarov	(United States) Rearden Racing	1	Ret	3	4	—N/a				**1**	3	**5**	2	—N/a				**2**	**Ret**	186
2	(United States) Chris Bellomo (United States) Kevin Woods	(United States) TRG - The Racers Group	**4**	2	8	3	—N/a				4	**7**	8	8	—N/a				6	7	176
3	(United States) Derek DeBoer (United States) Jim Rappaport	(United States) TRG - The Racers Group	8	**5**	**7**	7	—N/a				Ret	6	11	9	—N/a				9	4	133
4	(United States) Frank Gannett (United States) Drew Staveley	(United States) Ian Lacy Racing	5	3			—N/a				DNQ	WD	4	**3**	—N/a						76
5	(United States) Jeff Bader (United States) Casey Dennis	(United States) USRD					—N/a								—N/a				8	5	33
6	(United States) Jerold Lowe (United States) Michael McAleenan	(United States) Motorsports USA					—N/a						7	6	—N/a						30
7	(United States) Bob Michaelian (United States) Mark Pavan	(United States) Racers Edge Motorsports			6	**8**	—N/a								—N/a						28
8	(United States) Daren Jorgensen (United States) Brett Strom	(United States) RHC Jorgensen / Strom by Strom Motorsports			Ret	6	—N/a								—N/a						15
Pos.	Driver	Team	AUS (United States)		LAG (United States)		VIR (United States)		MOS (Canada)		SON (United States)		POR (United States)		WGL (United States)		ELK (United States)		LVS (United States)		Points

Key
Colour	Result
Gold	Race winner
Silver	2nd place
Bronze	3rd place
Green	Points finish
Blue	Non-points finish
Blue	Non-classified finish (NC)
Purple	Did not finish (Ret)
Black	Disqualified (DSQ)
Black	Excluded (EX)
White	Did not start (DNS)
White	Race cancelled (C)
White	Withdrew (WD)
Blank	Did not participate

**Bold** – Pole
Italics – Fastest Lap

==== Sprint Overall ====
Pos.	Driver	Team	STP (United States)		LBH (United States)	VIR (United States)		MOS (Canada)		SON (United States)		WGL (United States)		ELK (United States)		LVS (United States)		Points
1	(United States) Ian James	(United States) Team Panoz Racing	1	5	2	20	3	5	3	2	1	1	7	10	6	1	4	211
2	(United States) Michael Cooper	(United States) Blackdog Speed Shop	4	13	3	2	4	3	2	**1**	**2**	4	18	1	**1**	18	**1**	207.5
3	(United States) Spencer Pumpelly	(United States) TRG - The Racers Group	**2**	4	**1**	**19**	Ret	2	**1**	3	3	5	5	2	2	**10**	2	195
4	(United States) Gar Robinson	(United States) Robinson Racing	3	2	9	3	2	7	6	18	10	2	**2**	4	4			137
5	(United States) Jarett Andretti	(United States) Andretti Autosport	Ret	8	7	5	20	4	5	6	5	**19**	1	6	17	2	3	128
6	(United States) Shane Lewis	(United States) Robinson Racing	14	3	5	4	5	6	9	7	7	3	16	**3**	3			118.5
6	(United States) Shane Lewis	(United States) PF Racing														4	14	118.5
7	(United States) Drew Staveley	(United States) Ian Lacy Racing			10	6	6	8	8	4	6	6	4	7	8	5	5	96
8	(United States) Matt Fassnacht	(United States) Murillo Racing				1	**1**	Ret	13									50
9	(United States) Nicolai Elghanayan	(United States) Marco Polo Motorsports	Ret	12	17	8	7	**1**	7	8	8							49
10	(United States) Jade Buford	(United States) PF Racing	15	**1**												3	6	48
11	(United States) Jeff Courtney	(United States) JCR Motorsports										7	3	9	14	8	8	35
12	(Australia) Matt Brabham	(United States) CRP Racing			8					5	4					6	Ret	34
13	(United States) Alan Brynjolfsson	(United States) Park Place Motorsports	5	11	11	17	16	9	11	11	Ret	8	6	11	7	17	Ret	29
14	(Serbia) Marko Radisic	(United States) Precision Driving Tech	8	7	13	7	8			19	17	12	10	20	9			23
15	(United States) Tony Gaples	(United States) Blackdog Speed Shop	6	15	14	11	12	11	10	10	9	11	DNS	8	11	Ret	9	20.5
16	(United States) Preston Calvert	(United States) Team Panoz Racing	7	6														14
17	(United States) Nate Stacy	(United States) KohR Motorsports						Ret	4									12
18	(United States) Matt Keegan	(United States) Team Panoz Racing			4													12
19	(United States) James Pesek	(United States) PF Racing	Ret	Ret												9	7	10
20	(United States) James Sofronas	(United States) GMG Racing			6													8
21	(United States) Ari Balogh	(United States) Stephen Cameron Racing										9	8					6
22	(United States) Jeff Burton	(United States) Rearden Racing				9	10			9	12	Ret	Ret					5
23	(United States) Sean Quinlan	(United States) Stephen Cameron Racing				10	9	Ret	15	Ret	11	13	9	12	16	20	DNS	5
24	(United States) Mark Klenin	(United States) KPR	10	9	DNS	14	17	12	12	13	16	14	13	DNS	13	14	10	4
25	(Canada) Tom Collingwood	(United States) BGB Motorsports Group	9	10		16	11	13	17			18	17	14	12			3
26	(United States) Jason Bell	(United States) GMG Racing	12	14	15	18	14	10	16	14	15	15	11	17	Ret	13	13	1
27	(United States) Michael Dinan	(United States) Flying Lizard Motorsports	11	Ret	Ret	Ret	DNS					17	12	13	10	12	12	1
28	(United States) Michael McCann	(United States) McCann Racing				Ret	DNS					10	14	15	DNS			1
29	(Russia) Dmitry Novikov	(United States) Rearden Racing				12	19			17	19					11	11	1
	(United States) Toby Grahovec	(United States) Classic BMW								12	13							0
	(Canada) Samantha Tan	(Canada) ST Racing			12													0
	(United States) Chris Ohmacht	(United States) Classic BMW				13	13											0
	(United States) Ian Lacy	(United States) Ian Lacy Racing	13	DNS														0
	(United States) Frank Gannett	(United States) Ian Lacy Racing	16	DNS	Ret	15	18	14	14	20	20	16	15	16	DNS	15	15	0
	(United States) Henry Schmitt	(United States) Stephen Cameron Racing				DNS	15			15	14							0
	(United States) Greg Palmer	(United States) Kelly-Moss/Photon Motorsports				DNS	DNS							18	15			0
	(United States) CJ Moses	(United States) GMG Racing	17	Ret	16													0
	(United States) Erin Vogel	(United States) Flying Lizard Motorsports								16	18							0
	(United States) Bob Michaelian	(United States) Racers Edge Motorsports			Ret													
Drivers ineligible to score points
	(United States) Andrew Davis	(United States) Kelly-Moss Road & Race												5	5			
	(United States) Matt Travis	(United States) Nolasport														7	18	
	(Canada) Fred Roberts	(United States) Dexter Racing														16	16	
	(United States) Kevan Millstein	(United States) K2R Motorsports												19	DNS	19	17	
Pos.	Driver	Team	STP (United States)		LBH (United States)	VIR (United States)		MOS (Canada)		SON (United States)		WGL (United States)		ELK (United States)		LVS (United States)		Points

==== Sprint Am Cup ====
Pos.	Driver	Team	STP (United States)		LBH (United States)	VIR (United States)		MOS (Canada)		SON (United States)		WGL (United States)		ELK (United States)		LVS (United States)		Points
1	(United States) Drew Staveley	(United States) Ian Lacy Racing			10	6	6	8	8	**4**	**6**	**6**	4	7	**8**	5	5	261
2	(United States) Tony Gaples	(United States) Blackdog Speed Shop	6	**15**	14	11	12	11	10	10	9	11	DNS	8	11	Ret	9	146
3	(United States) Alan Brynjolfsson	(United States) Park Place Motorsports	5	11	11	17	16	9	**11**	11	Ret	8	6	**11**	7	17	Ret	142.5
4	(United States) Jarett Andretti	(United States) Andretti Autosport	**Ret**	8	7	5	20	**4**	5									101
5	(United States) Jeff Courtney	(United States) JCR Motorsports										7	**3**	9	14	8	8	96
6	(Serbia) Marko Radisic	(United States) Precision Driving Tech	8	7	13	7	8			19	17	12	10	20	9			93.5
7	(United States) Mark Klenin	(United States) KPR	10	9	DNS	14	17	12	12	13	16	14	13	DNS	13	14	10	84
8	(United States) Jason Bell	(United States) GMG Racing	12	14	15	18	14	10	16	14	15	15	11	17	Ret	13	13	72
9	(United States) Sean Quinlan	(United States) Stephen Cameron Racing				10	9	Ret	15	Ret	11	13	9	12	16	20	DNS	67.5
10	(United States) Matt Fassnacht	(United States) Murillo Racing				**1**	**1**	Ret	13									58
11	(United States) Jeff Burton	(United States) Rearden Racing				9	10			9	12	Ret	Ret					50
12	(Canada) Tom Collingwood	(United States) BGB Motorsports Group	9	10		16	11	13	17			18	17	14	12			45
13	(United States) Michael Dinan	(United States) Flying Lizard Motorsports	11	Ret	Ret	Ret	DNS					17	12	13	10	12	12	44
14	(United States) Preston Calvert	(United States) Team Panoz Racing	7	6														40
15	(Russia) Dmitry Novikov	(United States) Rearden Racing				12	19			17	19					11	11	32
16	(United States) Frank Gannett	(United States) Ian Lacy Racing	16	DNS	Ret	15	18	14	14	20	20	16	15	16	DNS	15	15	28
17	(United States) Matt Keegan	(United States) Team Panoz Racing			**4**													25
18	(United States) Ari Balogh	(United States) Stephen Cameron Racing										9	8					24
19	(United States) Henry Schmitt	(United States) Stephen Cameron Racing				DNS	15			15	14							17
20	(Canada) Samantha Tan	(Canada) ST Racing			12													10
21	(United States) Chris Ohmacht	(United States) Classic BMW				13	13											6
22	(United States) Erin Vogel	(United States) Flying Lizard Motorsports								16	18							6
23	(United States) CJ Moses	(United States) GMG Racing	17	Ret	16													3
24	(United States) Greg Palmer	(United States) Kelly-Moss/Photon Motorsports				DNS	DNS							18	15			2
	(United States) Bob Michaelian	(United States) Racers Edge Motorsports			Ret													
Drivers ineligible to score points
	(United States) Matt Travis	(United States) Nolasport														**7**	**18**	
	(Canada) Fred Roberts	(United States) Dexter Racing														16	16	
	(United States) Kevan Millstein	(United States) K2R Motorsports												19	DNS	19	17	
Pos.	Driver	Team	STP (United States)		LBH (United States)	VIR (United States)		MOS (Canada)		SON (United States)		WGL (United States)		ELK (United States)		LVS (United States)		Points

=== Teams' championships ===
==== SprintX ====
Pos.	Team	Manufacturer	Points
SprintX
1	(United States) Stephen Cameron Racing	BMW	211
2	(United States) Nolasport	Porsche	198
3	(United States) Andretti Autosport	McLaren	82
4	(United States) Flying Lizard Motorsports	Porsche	69
5	(United States) GMG Racing	Audi	66
6	(United States) Dexter Racing	Ginetta	57
7	(United States) Classic BMW	BMW	50
8	(United States) Team Panoz Racing	Panoz	46
9	(United States) Rearden Racing	Audi	45
10	(United States) Ramsey Racing/EXR Team by Premat	Mercedes-AMG	44
11	(United States) Auto Technic Racing	BMW	14
12	(United States) RS1	Porsche	7
East
1	(United States) Park Place Motorsports	Porsche	99
2	(United States) Murillo Racing	Mercedes-AMG	95
3	(United States) Classic BMW	BMW	90
4	(United States) Epic Motorsports	BMW	59
5	(United States) Precision Driving Tech	BMW	56
6	(United States) RENNtech Motorsports	Mercedes-AMG	55
7	(United States) Ian Lacy Racing	Ford	44
8	(United States) KRÜGSPEED	Ginetta	41
9	(United States) KohR Motorsports	Ford	27
10	(United States) Doghouse Performance	Audi	26
11	(United States) Nolasport	Porsche	25
12	(United States) BGB Motorsports Group	Porsche	22
13	(United States) Kelly-Moss Road & Race / Photon Motorsports	Audi; Porsche	19
14	(United States) Bodymotion Racing	Porsche	9
15	(United States) TRG - The Racers Group	Porsche	8
West
1	(Canada) ST Racing	BMW	147
2	(United States) Rearden Racing	Audi	92
3	(United States) Murillo Racing	Mercedes-AMG	70
4	(United States) USRD	Ginetta	66
5	(United States) TRG - The Racers Group	Porsche	56
6	(United States) Ian Lacy Racing	Ford; Ginetta	36
7	(United States) Racers Edge Motorsports	SIN	33
8	(United States) Stephen Cameron Racing	BMW	27
	(United States) RHC Jorgensen / Strom by Strom Motorsports	BMW	0
Pos.	Team	Manufacturer	Points

==== Sprint ====
Pos.	Team	Manufacturer	Points
1	(United States) Team Panoz Racing	Panoz	218
2	(United States) Blackdog Speed Shop	McLaren	210.5
3	(United States) TRG - The Racers Group	Porsche	204
4	(United States) Robinson Racing	Chevrolet	164.5
5	(United States) Andretti Autosport	McLaren	138
6	(United States) Ian Lacy Racing	Ford	112
7	(United States) Marco Polo Motorsports	KTM	54
8	(United States) Murillo Racing	Mercedes-AMG	50
9	(United States) PF Racing	Ford	48
10	(United States) JCR Motorsports	Maserati	45
11	(United States) Park Place Motorsports	Porsche	44
12	(United States) CRP Racing	Mercedes-AMG	38
13	(United States) Precision Driving Tech	BMW	38
14	(United States) Stephen Cameron Racing	BMW	18
15	(United States) KPR	McLaren	16.5
16	(United States) GMG Racing	Audi; Porsche	15
17	(United States) Rearden Racing	Audi; BMW	15
18	(United States) KohR Motorsports	Ford	12
19	(United States) BGB Motorsports Group	Porsche	12
20	(United States) Flying Lizard Motorsports	Audi; Porsche	8
21	(United States) McCann Racing	Audi	2
22	(Canada) ST Racing	BMW	1
23	(United States) Classic BMW	BMW	1
	(United States) Racers Edge Motorsports	SIN	0
	(United States) Kelly-Moss/Photon Motorsports	Audi	0
Pos.	Team	Manufacturer	Points

=== Manufacturers' championships ===
==== SprintX ====
Pos.	Manufacturer	Car	Points
1	(Germany) Porsche	718 Cayman GT4 Clubsport; Cayman GT4 Clubsport MR	319
2	(Germany) BMW	M4 GT4	309
3	(United States) Panoz	Avezzano GT4	215
4	(United Kingdom) McLaren	570S GT4	141
5	(Germany) Audi	R8 LMS GT4	113
	(Austria) KTM	X-Bow GT4	0
	(United States) Ford	Mustang GT4	0
Pos.	Manufacturer	Car	Points

==== Sprint ====
Pos.	Manufacturer	Car	Points
1	(United Kingdom) McLaren	570S GT4	282.5
2	(United States) Panoz	Avezzano GT4	255.5
3	(Germany) Porsche	718 Cayman GT4 Clubsport; Cayman GT4 Clubsport MR	235
4	(United States) Ford	Mustang GT4	200
5	(Germany) BMW	M4 GT4	124
6	(Austria) KTM	X-Bow GT4	93
7	(Germany) Audi	R8 LMS GT4	88
Pos.	Manufacturer	Car	Points

== See also ==
- 2019 Blancpain GT World Challenge America
