= Robby Foley =

American racing driver (born 1996)

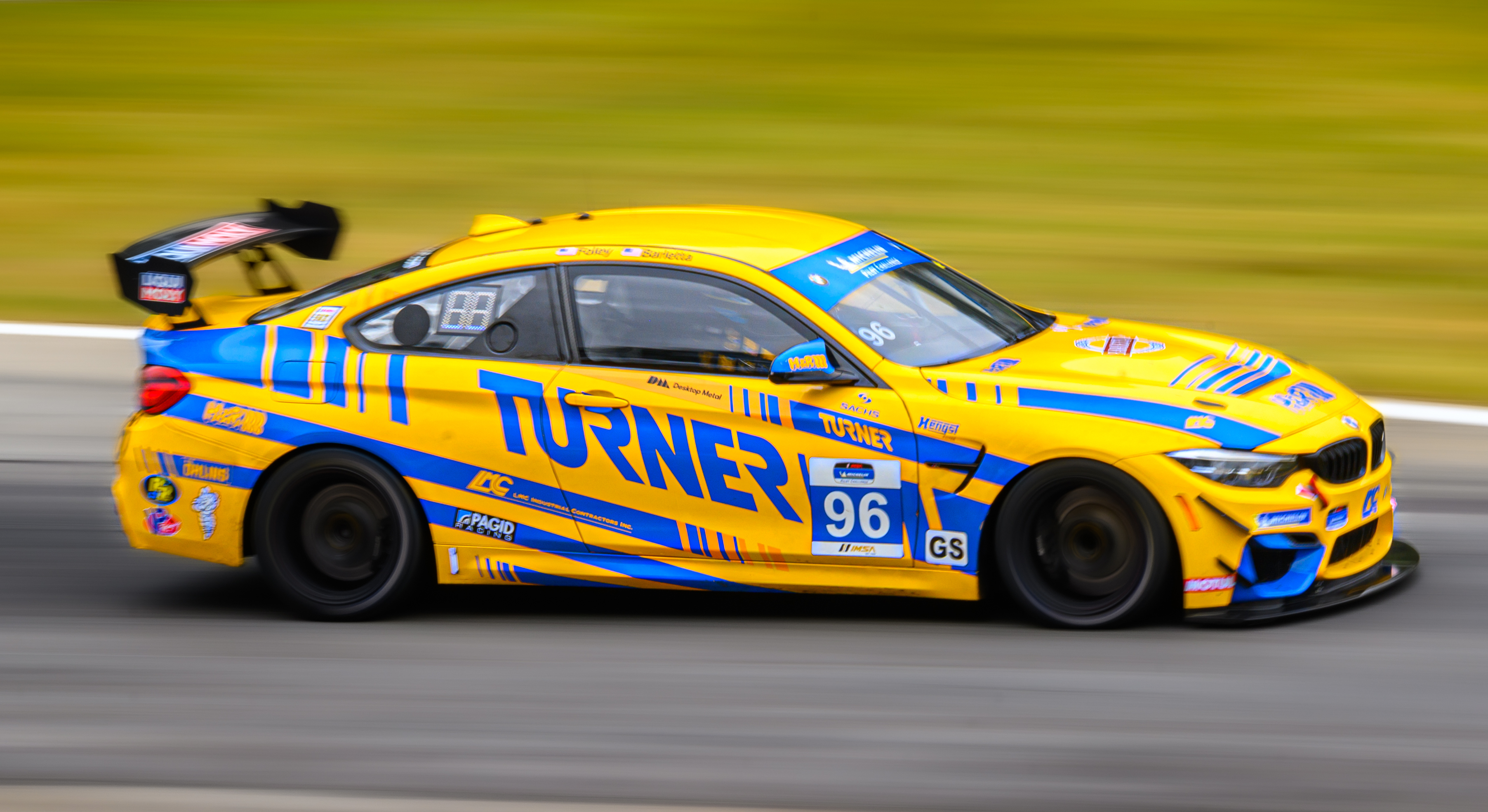
- Foley in 2019
- Nationality: American
- Born: Robert Foley; July 20, 1996 (age 30) Randolph, New Jersey, U.S.

WeatherTech SportsCar Championship career
- Debut season: 2018
- Current team: Turner Motorsport
- Categorisation: FIA Silver (until 2022); FIA Gold (2023–)
- Car number: 96
- Former teams: P1 Motorsports
- Starts: 53
- Wins: 7
- Podiums: 16
- Poles: 4

Previous series
- 2019-20 2013-17 2013-15: GT4 America Series; Global MX-5 Cup; Pirelli World Challenge

Championship titles
- 2020 2023 2024: GT4 America Series SprintX – Pro-Am Class; Michelin Pilot Challenge - GS Class; GT World Challenge America - Pro-Am

Michelin Pilot Challenge career
- Debut season: 2017
- Current team: Turner Motorsport
- Car number: 96
- Former teams: Freedom Autosport
- Starts: 48
- Wins: 5
- Podiums: 7
- Poles: 0
- Fastest laps: 2
- Statistics up to date as of January 14, 2023.

Robert Foley (born July 20, 1996) is an American racing driver who currently competes in the WeatherTech SportsCar Championship.

== Career ==
Foley driving the BMW M4 GT3 Evo during 2025 Sahlen's Six Hours of The Glen

Raised in Randolph, New Jersey, Foley's motorsports career was kickstarted in 2010 by a severe injury sustained during a football game while attending Randolph High School, which included a torn LCL, ACL, PCL, and a broken tibia, fibula, and ankle, alongside nerve damage, leading to a consideration by his physicians of amputating the affected leg. However, Foley had been active in motorsports throughout his youth, taking part in autocross events with his father. The following year, Foley attended the Skip Barber Racing School. After winning the Skip Barber class of the 2015 Global MX-5 Cup, Foley was granted a $100,000 scholarship by Mazda, leading to a full season campaign with Atlanta Motorsports Group in 2016. Following several seasons in MX-5 Cup competition, Foley moved into the IMSA SportsCar Championship with Turner Motorsport in 2018, making his debut at Belle Isle in June. The following season, Foley began racing full-time with the team. Foley scored his first IMSA victory at Canadian Tire Motorsports Park in July 2019. In 2020, Foley won his first official championship, winning the Pro-Am class of the GT4 America SprintX Series with co-driver Michael Dinan. The following year, Foley made his debut at the 24 Hours of Le Mans, driving for Team Project 1.

For 2022, Foley returned for another full season with Turner Motorsport and co-driver Bill Auberlen, driving the new-for-2022 BMW M4 GT3. The duo would claim their only class victory of the season at Mid-Ohio, and tallied four total podiums to finish fourth in the GTD-class championship. During 2022, Foley also embarked on full-season campaigns in the GT World Challenge America and Michelin Pilot Challenge. Paired with Michael Dinan in the former championship, the team scored Pro-class victories at Watkins Glen and in the Indianapolis 8 Hour, where they finished as the highest entry eligible for GT World Challenge America points; third overall. In the latter series, Foley and co-driver Vin Barletta finished seventh in the GS-class championship, placing as high as fourth at Laguna Seca and VIR. Foley also took part in the 2022 24 Hours of Spa, driving for Walkenhorst Motorsport in a Turner-inspired BMW M4 GT3.

Foley returned to Turner Motorsport in 2023, once again taking part in the IMSA SportsCar Championship and Michelin Pilot Challenge. Just prior to the 2023 24 Hours of Daytona, Foley was named as one of BMW North America's contracted drivers. Foley and full-time co-driver Patrick Gallagher claimed three runner-up finishes in the GTD class, concluding the championship season with a fourth-place points finish. In Pilot Challenge competition, Foley and Barletta claimed victories at Sebring and Watkins Glen, taking the GS-class championship by ten points over the Rebel Rock Racing duo of Robin Liddell and Frank DePew.

== Racing record ==
=== Career summary ===
Season	Series	Team	Races	Wins	Poles	F/Laps	Podiums	Points	Position
2013	Skip Barber MAZDASPEED Challenge		12	0	0	?	7	575	**3rd**
2014	Skip Barber MAZDASPEED Pro Challenge		12	0	2	2	6	642	**3rd**
2014	Pirelli World Challenge	Grid-1 Motorsports	3	0	0	0	0	161	7th
2015	Global MX-5 Cup - SBMX		?	?	?	?	?	?	?
2015	Pirelli World Challenge	Tech Sport Racing	3	0	1	1	0	244	14th
2016	Mazda MX-5 Cup Global Invitational	Atlanta Motorsports Group	2	1	1	0	1	98	**3rd**
2016	Global MX-5 Cup	Mazda Road to 24 Scholarship	12	2	0	1	3	453	4th
2017	IMSA Prototype Challenge	P1 Motorsports	5	0	0	0	2	70	7th
2017	Global MX-5 Cup	Atlanta Motorsports Group	4	0	?	?	2	92	13th
2017	Continental Tire SportsCar Challenge	Freedom Autosport	3	0	0	0	0	64	25th
2018	IMSA Prototype Challenge	P1 Motorsports	6	0	0	0	0	129	9th
2018	IMSA SportsCar Championship - GTD	P1 Motorsports	1	0	0	0	0	153	14th
2018	IMSA SportsCar Championship - GTD	Turner Motorsport	6	0	0	1	0	153	14th
2018	Pirelli World Challenge - SprintX - GTS Pro-Am	Flying Lizard Motorsports	2	0	0	0	0	3	60th
2019	GT4 America SprintX - Pro-Am	Flying Lizard Motorsports	11	0	0	0	3	82	4th
2019	IMSA SportsCar Championship - GTD	Turner Motorsport	11	2	2	0	5	262	**2nd**
2019	Michelin Pilot Challenge - GS	Turner Motorsport	7	0	0	0	0	115	22nd
2020	GT4 America SprintX - Pro-Am	Flying Lizard Motorsports	14	6	0	2	8	232	**1st**
2020	Michelin Pilot Challenge - GS	Turner Motorsport	10	3	0	1	3	235	4th
2020	IMSA SportsCar Championship - GTD	Turner Motorsport	11	2	0	0	4	256	5th
2021	GT World Challenge America - Pro	Turner Motorsport	11	1	1	1	7	157	**3rd**
2021	Michelin Pilot Challenge - GS	Turner Motorsport	10	0	0	0	1	2340	4th
2021	IMSA SportsCar Championship - GTD	Turner Motorsport	13	3	2	1	4	2880	5th
2021	International GT Open - Pro	TF Sport	4	0	0	1	2	30	8th
2021	International GT Open - Pro	Kessel Racing	2	0	0	0	1	30	8th
2021	FIA World Endurance Championship - LMGTE Am	Team Project 1	1	0	0	0	0	0	NC
2021	24H GT Series - P4	BMW M Motorsport	1	1	0	0	1	0	NC
2022	Michelin Pilot Challenge - GS	Turner Motorsport	10	0	0	0	0	2020	7th
2022	IMSA SportsCar Championship - GTD	Turner Motorsport	12	1	1	0	4	2785	4th
2022	GT World Challenge America - Pro	Turner Motorsport	11	2	0	0	6	180	5th
2022	GT World Challenge Europe Endurance Cup	Walkenhorst Motorsport	1	0	0	0	0	0	NC
2023	IMSA SportsCar Championship - GTD	Turner Motorsport	11	0	0	1	3	2924	4th
2023	Michelin Pilot Challenge - GS	Turner Motorsport	10	2	0	1	3	2430	**1st**
2023	GT World Challenge America - Pro-Am	Turner Motorsport	2	0	1	0	0	14	17th
2023	GT World Challenge America - Pro	Bimmerworld Racing	1	0	1	0	0	0	NC†
2023	Intercontinental GT Challenge	Bimmerworld Racing	1	0	0	0	0	0	NC
2024	IMSA SportsCar Championship - GTD	Turner Motorsport	10	1	0	0	4	3036	**2nd**
2024	Michelin Pilot Challenge - GS	Turner Motorsport	10	0	0	0	0	2180	9th
2024	GT World Challenge America - Pro-Am	Turner Motorsport	13	2	0	1	8	228	**1st**
2025	IMSA SportsCar Championship - GTD	Turner Motorsport	10	0	0	0	0	2739	5th
2025	Michelin Pilot Challenge - GS	Turner Motorsport	5	0	0	0	1	1240	20th
2025	GT World Challenge America - Pro-Am	Turner Motorsport	13	5	4	1	10	260	**1st**
2026	Michelin Pilot Challenge - GS	Turner Motorsport	10	0	0	0	0	1580	17th
2026	IMSA SportsCar Championship - GTD	Turner Motorsport	10	1	0	0	4	2843	**2nd**
2026	GT World Challenge America - Pro	Turner Motorsport	7	3	1	2	4	154	**1st**
2026	Nürburgring Langstrecken-Serie - BMW M2 Racing	Adrenalin Motorsport Team Mainhattan Wheels							

- † As Foley was a guest driver, he was ineligible to score points.

=== Complete WeatherTech SportsCar Championship results ===
(key) (Races in bold indicate pole position)

Year	Team	Class	Make	Engine	1	2	3	4	5	6	7	8	9	10	11	12	Rank	Points	Ref
2018	P1 Motorsports	GTD	Mercedes-AMG GT3	Mercedes-AMG M159 6.2 L V8	DAY; 12												14th	153	
2018	Turner Motorsport	GTD	BMW M6 GT3	BMW 4.4 L Turbo V8		SEB	MOH	BEL; 7	WGL	MOS; 11	LIM; 10	ELK; 4	VIR; 10	LGA; 12	PET		14th	153	
2019	Turner Motorsport	GTD	BMW M6 GT3	BMW 4.4 L Turbo V8	DAY; 9	SEB; 13	MOH; 15	DET; 10	WGL; 2	**MOS**; 1	LIM; 3	ELK; 3	VIR; 11	LGA; 7	PET; 1		2nd	262	
2020	Turner Motorsport	GTD	BMW M6 GT3	BMW 4.4 L Turbo V8	DAY; 6	DAY; 8	SEB; 3	ELK; 7	VIR; 1	ATL; 11	MOH; 11	CLT; 1	PET; 9	LGA; 2	SEB; 12		5th	256	
2021	Turner Motorsport	GTD	BMW M6 GT3	BMW 4.4 L Turbo V8	**DAY**; 6	SEB; 8	MOH; 1	DET; 8	WGL; 1	WGL; 12	LIM; 5	ELK; 2	LGA; 4	LBH; 16	**VIR**; 12	PET; 10	5th	2880	
2022	Turner Motorsport	GTD	BMW M4 GT3	BMW S58B30T0 3.0 L Twin Turbo I6	DAY; 18	SEB; 4	LBH; 4	LGA; 3	MOH; 1	DET; 8	WGL; 3	MOS; 4	LIM; 10	**ELK**; 10	VIR; 7	PET; 3	4th	2785	
2023	Turner Motorsport	GTD	BMW M4 GT3	BMW S58B30T0 3.0 L Twin Turbo I6	DAY; 17	SEB; 2	LBH; 8	MON; 7	WGL; 13	MOS; 13	LIM; 4	ELK; 12	VIR; 2	IMS; 5	PET; 2		4th	2924	
2024	Turner Motorsport	GTD	BMW M4 GT3	BMW S58B30T0 3.0 L Twin Turbo I6	DAY; 14	SEB; 6	LBH; 2	LGA; 2	WGL; 5	MOS; 4	ELK; 1	VIR; 4	IMS; 2	PET; 9			2nd	3032	
2025	Turner Motorsport	GTD	BMW M4 GT3 Evo	BMW S58B30T0 3.0 L Twin Turbo I6	DAY; 5	SEB; 5	LBH; 5	LGA; 9	WGL; 8	MOS; 8	ELK; 4	VIR; 4	IMS; 4	PET; 8			5th	2739	
2026	Turner Motorsport	GTD	BMW M4 GT3 Evo	BMW S58B30T0 3.0 L Twin Turbo I6	DAY; 10	SEB; 5	LBH; 2	LGA; 7	WGL; 7	MOS; 3	ELK; 5	VIR; 2	IMS; 1	PET; 18			2nd	2843	

^{*} Season still in progress.

=== Complete FIA World Endurance Championship results ===
(key) (Races in bold indicate pole position; races in italics indicate fastest lap)

Year	Entrant	Class	Chassis	Engine	1	2	3	4	5	6	Rank	Points
2021	Team Project 1	LMGTE Am	Porsche 911 RSR-19	Porsche 4.2L Flat-6	SPA	POR	MON	LMS; Ret	BHR	BHR	NC	0

=== Complete 24 Hours of Le Mans results ===
Year	Team	Co-Drivers	Car	Class	Laps	Pos.	Class Pos.
2021	(Germany) Team Project 1	(Norway) Anders Buchardt (Norway) Dennis Olsen	Porsche 911 RSR-19	GTE; Am	138	DNF	DNF

Sporting positions
Preceded by Greg Liefooghe; Sean Quinlan	GT4 America SprintX Cup; Pro-Am Champion; 2020; With: Michael Dinan	Succeeded by Class Defunct
