= GT4 America Series =

Sports car racing series based in the United States

- Category: Grand tourer (GT4)
- Country: United States
- Inaugural season: 2019
- Official website: https://www.gt4-america.com/

The GT4 America Series is a sports car racing series based in the United States. In 2019, the series was relaunched with the explicit GT4 title, following the alignment in 2017 of the Pirelli World Challenge series "GTS" class with SRO GT4, and the Stéphane Ratel Organisation assuming control of the series in May 2018. It is a GT World Challenge America support series, managed by SRO and sanctioned by the United States Auto Club.

== Classes ==
=== SprintX ===
In 2016 an extended sprint format series was added as a standalone championship in addition to its existing Sprint format racing series. SprintX races are 60 minutes in length and feature mandatory driver and tire changes.

For 2021 the original single-driver Sprint races (which ran alongside SprintX) were moved into the multiclass GT America series, which means all GT4 America races preserved the two-driver 60-minute format but dropped the SprintX name.

=== GT4 East & GT4 West ===
Beginning in 2019, GT4 America began two regional series integrated into its Sprint X Championship. The regional series consist of five rounds each in the eastern and western sides of North America in a two-driver, pro-am format.

== Champions ==
Silver Cup

The Silver Cup category in GT4 America is primarily aimed at driver pairings classified as Silver by the FIA — usually young talents or competitors with intermediate racing experience. In this class, both drivers share the same rating level, creating a balanced and competitive environment that highlights pure driving skill. Teams compete with GT4-homologated cars under the same technical regulations as the other classes, but they battle for their own points and podiums within the Silver Cup.

Year	Driver	Team	Constructor	Tyres	Info
2021	(United States) Kenny Murillo (United States) Christian Szymczak	(United States) Murillo Racing	(Germany) Mercedes	P	
2022	(United States) Eric Filgueiras (United Kingdom) Stevan McAleer	(United States) RennSport1	(Germany) Porsche	P	
2023	(United States) Zac Anderson	(United States) Auto Technic Racing	(Germany) BMW	P	
2024	(United States) John Capestro-Dubets (United States) Eric Filgueiras	(United States) RennSport1	(Germany) Porsche	P	
2025	(United States) Kevin Boehm (United States) Kenton Koch	(United States) CrowdStrike Racing by Random Vandals	(Germany) BMW	P	

Pro-Am Cup

The Pro-Am Cup category in GT4 America pairs one professional (Pro) driver with one amateur (Am) driver, as defined by FIA driver rankings. This structure creates a dynamic mix of experience and developing talent, often resulting in highly strategic racing. Both drivers share the same GT4-homologated car, alternating stints during the race, and compete for points and podiums within their own class. The Pro-Am Cup is known for close competition and the unique balance between speed, consistency, and teamwork.

Year	Driver	Team	Constructor	Tyres	Info
2021	(United States) Jason Hart (United States) Matt Travis	(United States) Nolasport	(Germany) Porsche	P	
2022	(United States) Jason Hart (United States) Scott Noble	(United States) Nolasport	(Germany) Porsche	P	
2023	(United States) Jason Hart (United States) Matt Travis	(United States) Nolasport	(Germany) Porsche	P	
2024	(Netherlands) Kay van Berlo (United States) Curt Swearingin	(United States) ACI Motorsports	(Germany) Porsche	P	
2025	(United States) Sam Craven (United States) Josh Green	(United States) Random Vandals Racing	(Germany) BMW	P	

Am Cup

The Am Cup category in GT4 America is reserved for teams made up entirely of amateur drivers, according to FIA driver rankings. It provides a competitive and welcoming environment for enthusiasts and developing racers to compete on equal footing. Driving GT4-homologated cars under the same rules as the other classes, Am Cup teams battle for their own championship points and podiums, emphasizing consistency, teamwork, and the joy of racing at a high level.

Year	Driver	Team	Constructor	Tyres	Info
2021	(United States) Kevin Conway (United States) John Geesbreght	(United States) TGR Smooge Racing	(Japan) Toyota	P	
2022	(United States) Eric Curran (United States) Steve Saleen	(United States) Team Saleen	(United States) Saleen	P	
2023	(United Kingdom) Charlie Postins (United States) James Clay	(United States) Bimmerworld Racing	(Germany) BMW	P	
2024	(United States) Robb Holland (United States) Jaden Lander	(Germany) Rotek Racing	(Germany) Porsche	P	
2025	(United Kingdom) Charlie Postins (United States) James Clay	(United States) Bimmerworld Racing	(Germany) BMW	P	

SprintX Silver Cup

The SprintX Silver Cup category in GT4 America features two-driver teams in which both drivers hold FIA Silver rankings, typically representing young, emerging talents or competitors with solid but developing experience. In the SprintX format, teammates share driving duties with mandatory pit stops and driver changes, highlighting coordination and consistency. Competing with GT4-homologated cars, Silver Cup teams race for their own class points and podiums, making it one of the most competitive and evenly matched categories in the championship.

Year	Driver	Team	Constructor	Tyres	Info
2020	(United States) Jarett Andretti (United States) Colin Mullan	(Canada) ST Racing	(Germany) BMW	P	

SprintX Pro-Am Cup

The SprintX Pro-Am Cup in GT4 America pairs one professional driver (“Pro”) with one amateur driver (“Am”), as defined by the driver rankings set by the FIA.

Races in the SprintX format last about 60 minutes and require driver changes and pit stops, meaning the two drivers share a single GT4-homologated car over the course of the race.

The class features a competitive field characterized by participation from both professional and amateur-level entries.

Teams in Pro-Am Cup fight for their own points and podiums, separate from other classes (like Silver Cup or Am Cup), allowing for balanced competition among similarly composed driver line-ups.

Year	Driver	Team	Constructor	Tyres	Info
2020	(United States) Michael Dinan (United States) Robby Foley	(United States) Flying Lizard Motorsports	(United Kingdom) Aston Martin	P	

Sprint Pro Cup

The Sprint Pro Cup in GT4 America was the category reserved for single-driver sprint races — meaning one driver per car, no driver changes.

Sprint Pro Cup events consisted of short-format races (around 50 minutes), giving a faster, more condensed style of competition compared to multi-driver endurance formats.

In 2020 — the last season when Sprint Pro Cup was listed — its grid was limited, and subsequently the “Sprint” portion of the championship was absorbed into another series, which means that Sprint Pro Cup is no longer actively featured as of 2021 onward.

Thus, Sprint Pro Cup represented the “pure sprint” side of GT4 racing — straightforward, all-out racing by a single driver in GT4-spec cars — but its role was eventually phased out in favor of the two-driver “SprintX” format.

Year	Driver	Team	Constructor	Tyres	Info
2020	(United States) Michael Cooper	(United States) Blackdog Speed Shop	(United Kingdom) McLaren	P	

SprintX Pro-Am Cup

Year	Driver	Team	Constructor	Tyres	Info
2019	(United States) Greg Liefooghe (United States) Sean Quinlan	(United States) Stephen Cameron Racing	(Germany) BMW	P	

SprintX Am Cup

Year	Driver	Team	Constructor	Tyres	Info
2019	(United States) Preston Calvert (United States) Matt Keegan	(United States) Team Panoz Racing	(United States) Panoz	P	
2020	(United States) Zac Anderson (United States) Sean Gibbons	(United States) Nolasport	(Germany) Porsche	P	

East Pro-Am Cup

Year	Driver	Team	Constructor	Tyres	Info
2019	(United States) Justin Raphael (United Kingdom) Stevan McAleer	(United States) BMW Classic	(Germany) BMW	P	

East Am Cup

Year	Driver	Team	Constructor	Tyres	Info
2019	(United States) Matt Fassnacht (United States) Christian Szymczak	(United States) Murillo Racing	(Germany) Mercedes	P	

West Pro-Am Cup

Year	Driver	Team	Constructor	Tyres	Info
2019	(United States) Harry Gottsacker (United States) Jon Miller	(Canada) ST Racing	(Germany) BMW	P	

West Am Cup

Year	Driver	Team	Constructor	Tyres	Info
2019	(United States) Jeff Burton (United States) Vesko Kozarov	(United States) Matt Fassnacht & Christian Szymczak Rearden Racing	(Germany) Audi	P	

Sprint Overall

Year	Driver	Team	Constructor	Tyres	Info
2019	(United States) Ian James	(United States) Team Panoz Racing	(United States) Panoz	P	

Sprint Am Cup

Year	Driver	Team	Constructor	Tyres	Info
2019	(United States) Drew Staveley (United States) Ian Lacy Racing	(United States) Ian Lacy Racing	(United States) Ford	P	
2020	(United States) Michael Dinan	(United States) Flying Lizard Motorsports	(United Kingdom) Aston Martin	P	
