= Jarett Andretti =

American racing driver

- Nationality: American
- Born: Jarett John Andretti; December 13, 1992 (age 33) Indianapolis, Indiana, U.S.

IMSA SportsCar Championship career
- Debut season: 2021 (LMP3)
- Current team: Andretti Autosport
- Categorisation: FIA Silver (until 2025); FIA Bronze (2026–)
- Car number: 36

Previous series
- 2019 2019 2018 2012: Indy Lights; GT4 America Series; Pirelli World Challenge; Rolex Sports Car Series

Jarett John Andretti (born December 13, 1992) is an American racing driver from Charlotte, North Carolina. He is the son of John Andretti, and the grandson of Aldo Andretti, who is the brother of Mario Andretti. He is also second cousin of retired IndyCar Series driver Marco Andretti.

== Racing career ==
Andretti began his career in sprint car racing in 2010, and moved onto Supermodified racing in 2012. Andretti won the 2016 Lawrenceburg Speedway track championship in his sprint car. He made one Rolex Sports Car Series start in 2012. He made his debuts in the USAC National Sprint Car, Silver Crown, and Midget scene in 2013, competing in those series through 2017. Andretti won the USAC National Sprint Car Rookie of the Year title in 2014.

Andretti returned to sports car racing full-time in 2018, making ten starts in the 2018 Pirelli World Challenge, while still competing in 24 USAC National Sprint Car races. In 2019, he raced in the 2019 GT4 America Series, driving a McLaren for Andretti Autosport in their first foray into the series. On April 12, 2019, it was announced that he would make his first Indy Lights start at the 2019 Freedom 100, also driving for Andretti Autosport.

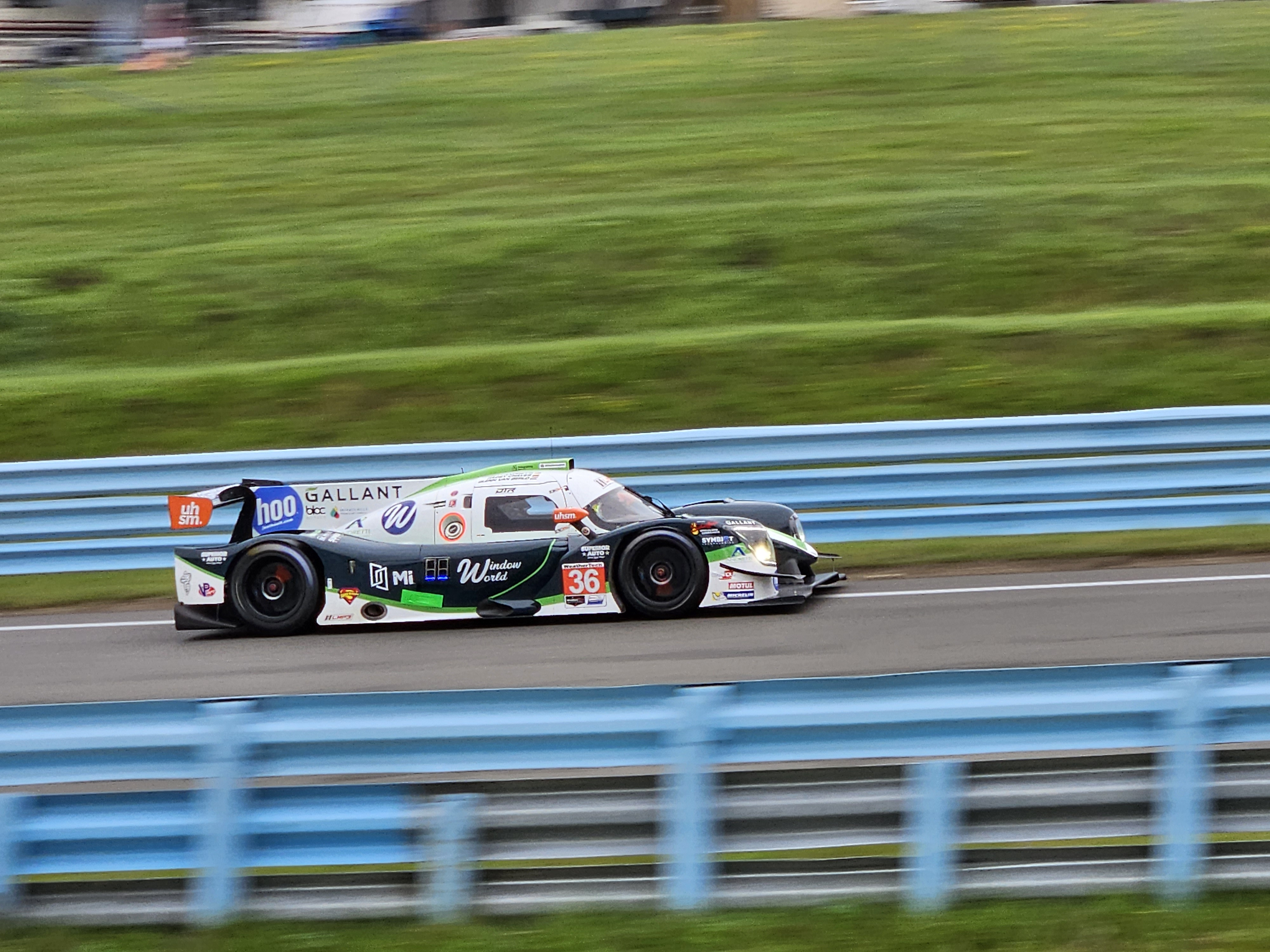
Andretti's Ligier JS P320 at Watkins Glen in 2023.

In 2021, Andretti announced plans to race full-time in the IMSA Prototype Challenge in the LMP3 class, alongside teammate Tristan Herbert. He would race the No. 18 Ligier JS P320, with sponsors for his inaugural season including Gallant, Schaeffer Oil, and Unite Health Share Ministries. On May 5, Andretti Autosport announced they were moving the car from the Prototype Challenge to the IMSA WeatherTech SportsCar Championship, maintaining Andretti as driver of the re-numbered No. 36 car.

== Personal life ==
Andretti graduated from North Carolina State University in 2015.

== Motorsports career results ==
=== Complete IMSA SportsCar Championship results ===
(key) (Races in bold indicate pole position; races in italics indicate fastest lap)

Year	Entrant	Class	Make	Engine	1	2	3	4	5	6	7	8	9	10	11	Rank	Points
2021	Andretti Autosport	LMP3	Ligier JS P320	Nissan VK56DE 5.6 L V8	DAY	SEB	MOH; 6	WGL; 4	WGL; 4	ELK; 5	PET; 10					8th	1432
2022	Andretti Autosport	LMP3	Ligier JS P320	Nissan VK56DE 5.6 L V8	**DAY**; 4†	SEB; 10	**MOH**; 3	WGL; 11	MOS; 2	ELK; 8	PET; 1					5th	1764
2023	Andretti Autosport	LMP3	Ligier JS P320	Nissan VK56DE 5.6 L V8	DAY; 7†	**SEB**; 9			WGL; 4	MOS					**PET**; 7	18th	810
2023	Andretti Autosport	GTD	Aston Martin Vantage AMR GT3	Aston Martin 4.0 L Turbo V8			LBH	LGA; 16			LIM; 15	ELK	VIR	IMS; 12		41st	555
2024	Andretti Motorsports	GTD	Porsche 911 GT3 R (992)	Porsche 4.2 L Flat-6	DAY; 9	SEB; 8	LBH; 9	LGA; 10	WGL; 10	MOS	ELK	VIR	IMS; 14	PET		23rd	1357

^{†} Points only counted towards the Michelin Endurance Cup, and not the overall LMP3 Championship.

=== 24 Hours of Daytona ===
24 Hours of Daytona results
Year	Class	No	Team	Car	Co-drivers	Laps	Position	Class Pos.	Ref
2012	GT	36	(United States) Yellow Dragon Motorsports	Mazda RX-8	(United States) John Andretti (Canada) Taylor Hacquard (Norway) Anders Krohn	270	50 ^{DNF}	36 ^{DNF}	
2022	LMP3	36	(United States) Andretti Autosport	Ligier JS P320	(Australia) Josh Burdon (Colombia) Gabby Chaves (Sweden) Rasmus Lindh	719	17	4	
2023	LMP3	36	(United States) Andretti Autosport	Ligier JS P320	(Colombia) Gabby Chaves (United States) Dakota Dickerson (Sweden) Rasmus Lindh	371	53 ^{DNF}	7 ^{DNF}	

=== American open-wheel racing results ===
(key)

==== Indy Lights ====
Year	Team	1	2	3	4	5	6	7	8	9	10	11	12	13	14	15	16	17	18	Rank	Points
**2019**	Andretti Autosport	STP	STP	COA	COA	IMS	IMS	INDY; 6	RDA	RDA	TOR	TOR	MOH	MOH	GTW	POR	POR	LAG	LAG	12th	23

* Season still in progress
