= 2021 GT World Challenge America =

Motor racing competition

The 2021 Fanatec GT World Challenge America Powered by AWS was the 15th season of the United States Auto Club's GT World Challenge America, and the fourth under ownership of SRO Motorsports Group.
The season began at Sonoma on March 6, and ended at Indianapolis on October 17.

== Calendar ==
The final calendar was released on October 26, 2020 The scheduled round at Canadian Tire Motorsport Park was later cancelled due to the COVID-19 pandemic.

Round	Circuit	Date
1	(United States) Sonoma Raceway, Sonoma, California	March 6–7
2	(United States) Circuit of the Americas, Elroy, Texas	May 1–2
3	(United States) Virginia International Raceway, Alton, Virginia	June 4–6
4	(United States) Road America, Elkhart Lake, Wisconsin	August 28–29
5	(United States) Watkins Glen International, Watkins Glen, New York	September 18–19
6	(United States) Sebring International Raceway, Sebring, Florida	October 1–3
7	(United States) Indianapolis Motor Speedway, Indianapolis, Indiana	October 17

Also part of the Intercontinental GT Challenge

== Entry list ==
Team	Car	No.	Drivers	Class	Rounds
(United States) CrowdStrike / DXDT Racing	Mercedes-AMG GT3 Evo	04	(United States) Colin Braun	PA	All
(United States) CrowdStrike / DXDT Racing	Mercedes-AMG GT3 Evo	04	(United States) George Kurtz	PA	All
(United States) CrowdStrike / DXDT Racing	Mercedes-AMG GT3 Evo	04	(United States) Ben Keating	PA	7
(United States) CrowdStrike / DXDT Racing	Mercedes-AMG GT3 Evo	19	(United States) Michael Cooper	PA	All
(United States) CrowdStrike / DXDT Racing	Mercedes-AMG GT3 Evo	19	(United States) Erin Vogel	PA	All
(United States) CrowdStrike / DXDT Racing	Mercedes-AMG GT3 Evo	19	(United States) Thomas Merrill	PA	7
(United States) CrowdStrike / DXDT Racing	Mercedes-AMG GT3 Evo	63	(United States) David Askew	PA	All
(United States) CrowdStrike / DXDT Racing	Mercedes-AMG GT3 Evo	63	(United Kingdom) Ryan Dalziel	PA	All
(United States) CrowdStrike / DXDT Racing	Mercedes-AMG GT3 Evo	63	(United States) Scott Smithson	PA	7
(United States) K-PAX Racing	Lamborghini Huracán GT3 Evo	3	(Italy) Andrea Caldarelli	P	All
(United States) K-PAX Racing	Lamborghini Huracán GT3 Evo	3	(South Africa) Jordan Pepper	P	All
(United States) K-PAX Racing	Lamborghini Huracán GT3 Evo	3	(Italy) Mirko Bortolotti	P	7
(United States) K-PAX Racing	Lamborghini Huracán GT3 Evo	6	(United States) Corey Lewis	P	All
(United States) K-PAX Racing	Lamborghini Huracán GT3 Evo	6	(Italy) Giovanni Venturini	P	All
(United States) K-PAX Racing	Lamborghini Huracán GT3 Evo	6	(Italy) Marco Mapelli	P	7
(United States) TR3 Racing	Lamborghini Huracán GT3 Evo	9	(Lebanon) Ziad Ghandour	PA	1–3
(United States) TR3 Racing	Lamborghini Huracán GT3 Evo	9	(Italy) Giacomo Altoè	PA	1–2, 4–5
(United States) TR3 Racing	Lamborghini Huracán GT3 Evo	9	(United Kingdom) Sandy Mitchell	PA	3
(United States) TR3 Racing	Lamborghini Huracán GT3 Evo	9	(Mexico) Martín Fuentes	PA	4–6
(United States) TR3 Racing	Lamborghini Huracán GT3 Evo	9	(Italy) Giacomo Altoè	P	6
(United States) TR3 Racing	Lamborghini Huracán GT3 Evo	9	(Denmark) Dennis Lind	P	6
(United States) TR3 Racing	Lamborghini Huracán GT3 Evo	10	(United States) John Megrue	Am	4–5
(United States) TR3 Racing	Lamborghini Huracán GT3 Evo	10	(United States) Bill Sweedler	Am	4–5
(United States) TR3 Racing	Lamborghini Huracán GT3 Evo	10	(Italy) Giacomo Altoè	PA	7
(United States) TR3 Racing	Lamborghini Huracán GT3 Evo	10	(United States) John Megrue	PA	7
(United States) TR3 Racing	Lamborghini Huracán GT3 Evo	10	(United States) Bill Sweedler	PA	7
(United States) Ian Lacy Racing with G3 Racing	Aston Martin Vantage AMR GT3	12	(United States) Frank Gannett	PA	1–6
(United States) Ian Lacy Racing with G3 Racing	Aston Martin Vantage AMR GT3	12	(United States) Drew Staveley	PA	1–6
(United States) Ian Lacy Racing with G3 Racing	Aston Martin Vantage AMR GT3	12	(United States) Ian Lacy	PA	7
(United States) Wright Motorsports	Porsche 911 GT3 R	20	(Belgium) Jan Heylen	PA	1–6
(United States) Wright Motorsports	Porsche 911 GT3 R	20	(United States) Fred Poordad	PA	1–6
(United States) Wright Motorsports	Porsche 911 GT3 R	20	(Belgium) Jan Heylen	S	7
(United States) Wright Motorsports	Porsche 911 GT3 R	20	(United States) Fred Poordad	S	7
(United States) Wright Motorsports	Porsche 911 GT3 R	20	(United States) Max Root	S	7
(United States) Triarsi Competizione	Ferrari 488 GT3	23	(United States) Charlie Scardina	Am	6
(United States) Triarsi Competizione	Ferrari 488 GT3	23	(United States) Onofrio Triarsi	Am	6
(United States) Winward Racing	Mercedes-AMG GT3 1 Mercedes-AMG GT3 Evo 2	33	(United States) Russell Ward	P	1–6
(United States) Winward Racing	Mercedes-AMG GT3 1 Mercedes-AMG GT3 Evo 2	33	(United Kingdom) Philip Ellis	P	1–2, 4
(United States) Winward Racing	Mercedes-AMG GT3 1 Mercedes-AMG GT3 Evo 2	33	(Canada) Mikaël Grenier	P	3, 5–6
(United States) Winward Racing	Mercedes-AMG GT3 1 Mercedes-AMG GT3 Evo 2	33	(Germany) Marvin Dienst	S	7
(United States) Winward Racing	Mercedes-AMG GT3 1 Mercedes-AMG GT3 Evo 2	33	(United Kingdom) Philip Ellis	S	7
(United States) Winward Racing	Mercedes-AMG GT3 1 Mercedes-AMG GT3 Evo 2	33	(United States) Russell Ward	S	7
(Italy) AF Corse	Ferrari 488 GT3	61	(United States) Conrad Grunewald	Am	All
(Italy) AF Corse	Ferrari 488 GT3	61	(United States) Jean-Claude Saada	Am	All
(Italy) AF Corse	Ferrari 488 GT3	61	(United States) Mark Kvamme	Am	7
(United Kingdom) Inception Racing with Optimum Motorsport	McLaren 720S GT3	70	(United States) Brendan Iribe	PA	2–3, 7
(United Kingdom) Inception Racing with Optimum Motorsport	McLaren 720S GT3	70	(United Kingdom) Ollie Millroy	PA	2–3, 7
(United Kingdom) Inception Racing with Optimum Motorsport	McLaren 720S GT3	70	(United States) Kevin Madsen	PA	7
(Canada) Compass Racing	Acura NSX GT3 Evo	77	(United States) Matt McMurry	PA	All
(Canada) Compass Racing	Acura NSX GT3 Evo	77	(Mexico) Rodrigo Sales	PA	1–2, 6
(Canada) Compass Racing	Acura NSX GT3 Evo	77	(United States) Michael DiMeo	PA	3–5
(Canada) Compass Racing	Acura NSX GT3 Evo	77	(Germany) Mario Farnbacher	S	7
(Canada) Compass Racing	Acura NSX GT3 Evo	77	(United States) Ashton Harrison	S	7
(Canada) Compass Racing	Acura NSX GT3 Evo	77	(United States) Matt McMurry	S	7
(United States) Zelus Motorsports	Lamborghini Huracán GT3 Evo	88	(United States) Jason Harward	PA	2–7
(United States) Zelus Motorsports	Lamborghini Huracán GT3 Evo	88	(United States) Madison Snow	PA	2–7
(United States) Rearden Racing	Lamborghini Huracán GT3 Evo	91	(United States) Jeff Burton	PA	All
(United States) Rearden Racing	Lamborghini Huracán GT3 Evo	91	(Bulgaria) Vesko Kozarov	PA	All
(United States) Racers Edge Motorsports	Acura NSX GT3 Evo	93	(United States) Taylor Hagler	PA 1 S 7	All
(United States) Racers Edge Motorsports	Acura NSX GT3 Evo	93	(United States) Dakota Dickerson	PA 1 S 7	1, 4, 6–7
(United States) Racers Edge Motorsports	Acura NSX GT3 Evo	93	(United States) Jacob Abel	PA 1 S 7	2–3, 5, 7
(United States) Turner Motorsport	BMW M6 GT3	96	(United States) Michael Dinan	P	All
(United States) Turner Motorsport	BMW M6 GT3	96	(United States) Robby Foley	P	All
(United States) Turner Motorsport	BMW M6 GT3	96	(United States) Connor De Phillippi	P	7

Icon	Class
P	Pro Cup
S	Silver Cup
PA	Pro/Am Cup
Am	Am Cup

== Race results ==
Bold indicates overall winner

Round		Circuit	Pole position	Pro Winners	Silver Winners	Pro/Am Winners	Am Winners	Ref.
1	R1	(United States) Sonoma	(United States) #3 K-Pax Racing	**(United States) #3 K-Pax Racing**	No Entries	(United States) #20 Wright Motorsports	(Italy) #61 AF Corse	
1	R1	(United States) Sonoma	(Italy) Andrea Caldarelli (South Africa) Jordan Pepper	**(Italy) Andrea Caldarelli** **(South Africa) Jordan Pepper**	No Entries	(Belgium) Jan Heylen (United States) Fred Poordad	(United States) Conrad Grunewald (United States) Jean-Claude Saada	
1	R2	(United States) Sonoma	(United States) #3 K-Pax Racing	**(United States) #3 K-Pax Racing**	No Entries	(United States) #04 DXDT Racing	(Italy) #61 AF Corse	
1	R2	(United States) Sonoma	(Italy) Andrea Caldarelli (South Africa) Jordan Pepper	**(Italy) Andrea Caldarelli** **(South Africa) Jordan Pepper**	No Entries	(United States) Colin Braun (United States) George Kurtz	(United States) Conrad Grunewald (United States) Jean-Claude Saada	
2	R1	(United States) Austin	(United States) #3 K-Pax Racing	**(United States) #3 K-Pax Racing**	No Entries	(United Kingdom) #70 Inception Racing	(Italy) #61 AF Corse	
2	R1	(United States) Austin	(Italy) Andrea Caldarelli (South Africa) Jordan Pepper	**(Italy) Andrea Caldarelli** **(South Africa) Jordan Pepper**	No Entries	(United States) Brendan Iribe (United Kingdom) Ollie Millroy	(United States) Conrad Grunewald (United States) Jean-Claude Saada	
2	R2	(United States) Austin	(United States) #33 Winward Racing	**(United States) #6 K-Pax Racing**	No Entries	(United States) #04 DXDT Racing	(Italy) #61 AF Corse	
2	R2	(United States) Austin	(United Kingdom) Philip Ellis (United States) Russell Ward	**(United States) Corey Lewis** **(Italy) Giovanni Venturini**	No Entries	(United States) Colin Braun (United States) George Kurtz	(United States) Conrad Grunewald (United States) Jean-Claude Saada	
3	R1	(United States) Virginia	(United States) #3 K-Pax Racing	**(United States) #3 K-Pax Racing**	No Entries	(United States) #19 DXDT Racing	(Italy) #61 AF Corse	
3	R1	(United States) Virginia	(Italy) Andrea Caldarelli (South Africa) Jordan Pepper	**(Italy) Andrea Caldarelli** **(South Africa) Jordan Pepper**	No Entries	(United States) Michael Cooper (United States) Erin Vogel	(United States) Conrad Grunewald (United States) Jean-Claude Saada	
3	R2	(United States) Virginia	(United States) #33 Winward Racing	**(United States) #33 Winward Racing**	No Entries	(Canada) #77 Compass Racing	(Italy) #61 AF Corse	
3	R2	(United States) Virginia	(Canada) Mikaël Grenier (United States) Russell Ward	**(Canada) Mikaël Grenier** **(United States) Russell Ward**	No Entries	(Canada) Michael Di Meo (United States) Matt McMurry	(United States) Conrad Grunewald (United States) Jean-Claude Saada	
4	R1	(United States) Road America	(United States) #3 K-Pax Racing	**(United States) #3 K-Pax Racing**	No Entries	(United States) #93 Racers Edge Motorsports	(Italy) #61 AF Corse	
4	R1	(United States) Road America	(Italy) Andrea Caldarelli (South Africa) Jordan Pepper	**(Italy) Andrea Caldarelli** **(South Africa) Jordan Pepper**	No Entries	(United States) Dakota Dickerson (United States) Taylor Hagler	(United States) Conrad Grunewald (United States) Jean-Claude Saada	
4	R2	(United States) Road America	(United States) #93 Racers Edge Motorsports	**(United States) #96 Turner Motorsport**	No Entries	(United States) #20 Wright Motorsports	(Italy) #61 AF Corse	
4	R2	(United States) Road America	(United States) Dakota Dickerson (United States) Taylor Hagler	**(United States) Michael Dinan** **(United States) Robby Foley**	No Entries	(Belgium) Jan Heylen (United States) Fred Poordad	(United States) Conrad Grunewald (United States) Jean-Claude Saada	
5	R1	(United States) Watkins Glen	(United States) #3 K-Pax Racing	**(United States) #3 K-Pax Racing**	No Entries	(United States) #93 Racers Edge Motorsports	(Italy) #61 AF Corse	
5	R1	(United States) Watkins Glen	(Italy) Andrea Caldarelli (South Africa) Jordan Pepper	**(Italy) Andrea Caldarelli** **(South Africa) Jordan Pepper**	No Entries	(United States) Jacob Abel (United States) Taylor Hagler	(United States) Conrad Grunewald (United States) Jean-Claude Saada	
5	R2	(United States) Watkins Glen	(United States) #3 K-Pax Racing	**(United States) #3 K-Pax Racing**	No Entries	(Canada) #77 Compass Racing	(Italy) #61 AF Corse	
5	R2	(United States) Watkins Glen	(Italy) Andrea Caldarelli (South Africa) Jordan Pepper	**(Italy) Andrea Caldarelli** **(South Africa) Jordan Pepper**	No Entries	(Canada) Michael Di Meo (United States) Matt McMurry	(United States) Conrad Grunewald (United States) Jean-Claude Saada	
6	R1	(United States) Sebring	(United States) #3 K-Pax Racing	**(United States) #3 K-Pax Racing**	No Entries	(United States) #20 Wright Motorsports	(United States) #23 Triarsi Competizione	
6	R1	(United States) Sebring	(Italy) Andrea Caldarelli (South Africa) Jordan Pepper	**(Italy) Andrea Caldarelli** **(South Africa) Jordan Pepper**	No Entries	(Belgium) Jan Heylen (United States) Fred Poordad	(United States) Charlie Scardina (United States) Onofrio Triarsi	
6	R2	(United States) Sebring	(United States) #20 Wright Motorsports	**(United States) #3 K-Pax Racing**	No Entries	(United States) #93 Racers Edge Motorsports	(Italy) #61 AF Corse	
6	R2	(United States) Sebring	(Belgium) Jan Heylen (United States) Fred Poordad	**(Italy) Andrea Caldarelli** **(South Africa) Jordan Pepper**	No Entries	(United States) Dakota Dickerson (United States) Taylor Hagler	(United States) Conrad Grunewald (United States) Jean-Claude Saada	
7	3H	(United States) Indianapolis	(Italy) #51 AF Corse - Francorchamps Motors	(United States) #6 K-Pax Racing	**(Canada) #77 Compass Racing**	(United States) #91 Rearden Racing	(Italy) #61 AF Corse	
7	3H	(United States) Indianapolis	(France) Côme Ledogar (Denmark) Nicklas Nielsen (Italy) Alessandro Pier Guidi	(United States) Corey Lewis (Italy) Marco Mapelli (Italy) Giovanni Venturini	**(Germany) Mario Farnbacher** **(United States) Ashton Harrison** **(United States) Matt McMurry**	(United States) Jeff Burton (Bulgaria) Vesko Kozarov	(United States) Conrad Grunewald (United States) Mark Kvamme (United States) Jean-Claude Saada	
7	8H	(United States) Indianapolis		**(France) #26 Audi Sport Team Saintéloc**	(Canada) #77 Compass Racing	(Australia) #75 SunEnergy1 Racing	(Italy) #61 AF Corse	
7	8H	(United States) Indianapolis		**(Germany) Christopher Haase** **(Switzerland) Patric Niederhauser** **(Germany) Markus Winkelhock**	(Germany) Mario Farnbacher (United States) Ashton Harrison (United States) Matt McMurry	(Canada) Mikaël Grenier (Australia) Kenny Habul (Austria) Martin Konrad	(United States) Conrad Grunewald (United States) Mark Kvamme (United States) Jean-Claude Saada	

== Championship standings ==
Scoring system

Championship points are awarded for the first ten positions in each race. Entries are required to complete 75% of the winning car's race distance in order to be classified and earn points. Individual drivers are required to participate for a minimum of 40 minutes in order to earn championship points in any race.

Standard Points

Position	**1st**	**2nd**	**3rd**	**4th**	**5th**	**6th**	**7th**	**8th**	**9th**	**10th**
Points	25	18	15	12	10	8	6	4	2	1

Indianapolis Points

Position	**1st**	**2nd**	**3rd**	**4th**	**5th**	**6th**	**7th**	**8th**	**9th**	**10th**
Points	50	36	30	24	20	16	12	8	4	2

=== Drivers' championship ===
Pos.	Driver	Team	SON		AUS		VIR		ELK		WGL		SEB		IND	Points
Pos.	Driver	Team	RD1	RD2	RD1	RD2	RD1	RD2	RD1	RD2	RD1	RD2	RD1	RD2	RDU	Points
Pro class
1	(Italy) Andrea Caldarelli (South Africa) Jordan Pepper	(United States) K-Pax Racing	**1**	**1**	**1**	2	**1**	14	**1**	4	**1**	**1**	**1**	1		270
2	(United States) Corey Lewis (Italy) Giovanni Venturini	(United States) K-Pax Racing	2	2	6	1	Ret	2	4	2	9	2	5	3	3	234
3	(United States) Michael Dinan (United States) Robby Foley	(United States) Turner Motorsport	9	8	3	5	2	6	7	**1**	2	4	DNS	Ret		157
4	(United States) Russell Ward	(United States) Winward Racing	Ret	7	2	**3**	4	**1**	2	5	3	Ret	Ret	2	Ret	151
5	(United Kingdom) Philip Ellis	(United States) Winward Racing	Ret	7	2	**3**			2	5					Ret	78
6	(Canada) Mikaël Grenier	(United States) Winward Racing					4	**1**			3	Ret	Ret	2		73
7	(Italy) Giacomo Altoè (Denmark) Dennis Lind	(United States) TR3 Racing											2	4		30
Pro-Am class
1	(Belgium) Jan Heylen (United States) Fred Poordad	(United States) Wright Motorsports	3	4	5	5	**5**	**4**	6	3	8	**5**	**3**	**8**	8	236
2	(United States) Taylor Hagler	(United States) Racers Edge Motorsports	5	5	11	Ret	9	5	3	**14**	4	7	4	5	2	204
3	(United States) Matt McMurry	(Canada) Compass Racing	**Ret**	9	DNS	NC	12	3	**5**	13	5	3	7	7	1	183
4	(United States) Dakota Dickerson	(United States) Racers Edge Motorsports	5	5					3	**14**			4	5	2	138
5	(United States) Michael Cooper (United States) Erin Vogel	(United States) DXDT Racing	7	6	14	Ret	3	8	11	NC	**6**	8	12	6	Ret	114
6	(United States) Colin Braun (United States) George Kurtz	(United States) DXDT Racing	6	**3**	9	4	6	Ret	WD	WD					6	111
7	(United States) David Askew (United Kingdom) Ryan Dalziel	(United States) DXDT Racing	4	11	10	8	DNS	9	9	7	11	11	11	9		107
8	(Canada) Michael Di Meo	(Canada) Compass Racing					12	3	**5**	13	5	3				96
9	(United States) Jason Harward (United States) Madison Snow	(United States) Zelus Motorsport			15	9	7	7	13	12	13	9	6	12	9	90
10	(Italy) Giacomo Altoè	(United States) TR3 Racing	Ret	10	7	**11**			8	6	7	6				88
11	(United States) Jeff Burton (Bulgaria) Vesko Kozarov	(United States) Rearden Racing	10	12	8	NC	Ret	10	10	11	NC	Ret	13	Ret	4	82
12	(United States) Frank Gannett (United States) Drew Staveley	(United States) Ian Lacy Racing w/ G3 Racing	11	14	13	12	8	11	12	8	10	Ret	10	10		74
13	(United States) Brendan Iribe (United Kingdom) Ollie Millroy	(United Kingdom) Inception Racing with Optimum Motorsport			**4**	6	10	Ret							7	66
14	(United States) Jacob Abel	(United States) Racers Edge Motorsports			11	Ret	9	5			4	7				66
15	(Mexico) Martín Fuentes	(United States) TR3 Racing							8	6	7	6				57
16	(Mexico) Rodrigo Sales	(Canada) Compass Racing	**Ret**	9	DNS	NC							7	7		37
17	(Lebanon) Ziad Ghandour	(United States) TR3 Racing	Ret	10	7	**11**	13	13								35
18	(United Kingdom) Sandy Mitchell	(United States) TR3 Racing					13	13								4
Am class
1	(United States) Conrad Grunewald (United States) Jean-Claude Saada	(Italy) AF Corse	**8**	**13**	**12**	**10**	**11**	**12**	**14**	**9**	**12**	**10**	9	**11**	5	343
2	(United States) John Megrue (United States) Bill Sweedler	(United States) TR3 Racing							15	10	Ret	DNS				36
3	(United States) Charlie Scardina (United States) Onofrio Triarsi	(United States) Triarsi Competizione											**8**	Ret		25

Key
Colour	Result
Gold	Race winner
Silver	2nd place
Bronze	3rd place
Green	Points finish
Blue	Non-points finish
Blue	Non-classified finish (NC)
Purple	Did not finish (Ret)
Black	Disqualified (DSQ)
Black	Excluded (EX)
White	Did not start (DNS)
White	Race cancelled (C)
White	Withdrew (WD)
Blank	Did not participate

**Bold** – Pole
Italics – Fastest Lap

=== Teams' championship ===
Pos.	Team	Manufacturer	SON		AUS		VIR		ELK		WGL		SEB		IND	Points
Pos.	Team	Manufacturer	RD1	RD2	RD1	RD2	RD1	RD2	RD1	RD2	RD1	RD2	RD1	RD2	RDU	Points
Pro class
1	(United States) K-Pax Racing	(Italy) Lamborghini	**1**	**1**	**1**	1	**1**	2	**1**	2	**1**	**1**	**1**	1	3	236
2	(United States) Turner Motorsport	(Germany) BMW	9	8	3	5	2	6	7	**1**	2	4	DNS	Ret		172
3	(United States) Winward Racing	(Germany) Mercedes-AMG	Ret	7	2	3	4	**1**	2	5	3	Ret	Ret	2	Ret	142
4	(United States) TR3 Racing	(Italy) Lamborghini											2	4		33
Pro-Am class
1	(United States) Wright Motorsports	(Germany) Porsche	3	4	5	5	**5**	**4**	6	3	8	**5**	**3**	**8**	8	183
2	(United States) DXDT Racing	(Germany) Mercedes-AMG	4	**3**	9	4	3	8	9	7	**6**	8	11	6	6	163
3	(United States) Racers Edge Motorsports	(Japan) Acura	5	5	11	Ret	9	5	3	**14**	4	7	4	5	2	129
4	(Canada) Compass Racing	(Japan) Acura	**Ret**	9	DNS	NC	12	3	**5**	13	5	3	7	7	1	110
5	(United States) TR3 Racing	(Italy) Lamborghini	Ret	10	7	**11**	13	13	8	6	7	6				100
6	(United States) Ian Lacy Racing w/ G3 Racing	(United Kingdom) Aston Martin	11	14	13	12	8	11	12	8	10	Ret	10	10		74
7	(United States) Zelus Motorsport	(Italy) Lamborghini			15	9	7	7	13	12	13	9	6	12	9	69
8	(United States) Rearden Racing	(Italy) Lamborghini	10	12	8	NC	Ret	10	10	11	NC	Ret	13	Ret	4	58
9	(United Kingdom) Inception Racing with Optimum Motorsport	(United Kingdom) McLaren			**4**	6	10	Ret							7	48
Am class
1	(Italy) AF Corse	(Italy) Ferrari	**8**	**13**	**12**	**10**	**11**	**12**	**14**	**9**	**12**	**10**	9	**11**	5	250
2	(United States) TR3 Racing	(Italy) Lamborghini							15	10	Ret	DNS	**8**	Ret		36
Pos.	Driver	Team	SON		AUS		VIR		ELK		WGL		SEB		IND	Points

=== Manufacturers' championship ===
Pos.	Manufacturer	SON		AUS		VIR		ELK		WGL		SEB		IND	Points
Pos.	Manufacturer	RD1	RD2	RD1	RD2	RD1	RD2	RD1	RD2	RD1	RD2	RD1	RD2	RDU	Points
1	(Italy) Lamborghini	**1**	**1**	**1**	**1**	**1**	2	**1**	2	**1**	**1**	**1**	1	3	100
2	(Germany) Mercedes-AMG	4	3	2	3	3	**1**	2	5	3	Ret	Ret	2	6	69
3	(Germany) Porsche	3	4	5	5	5	4	6	3	8	5	3	**8**	8	55
4	(Germany) BMW	9	8	3	4	2	6	7	**1**	2	4	DNS	Ret		48
5	(Japan) Acura	5	5	11	Ret	9	3	3	13	4	3	4	5	1	32
6	(Italy) Ferrari	8	13	12	10	11	12	14	9	12	10	9	11	5	32
7	(United Kingdom) McLaren			4	7	10	Ret								22
8	(United Kingdom) Aston Martin	11	14	13	12	8	11	12	8	10	Ret	10	10		16
Pos.	Manufacturer	SON		AUS		VIR		ELK		WGL		SEB		IND	Points

== See also ==
- 2021 GT World Challenge Europe
- 2021 GT World Challenge Europe Endurance Cup
- 2021 GT World Challenge Europe Sprint Cup
- 2021 GT World Challenge Asia
- 2021 GT World Challenge Australia
