= Onofrio Triarsi =

American racing driver (born 1994)

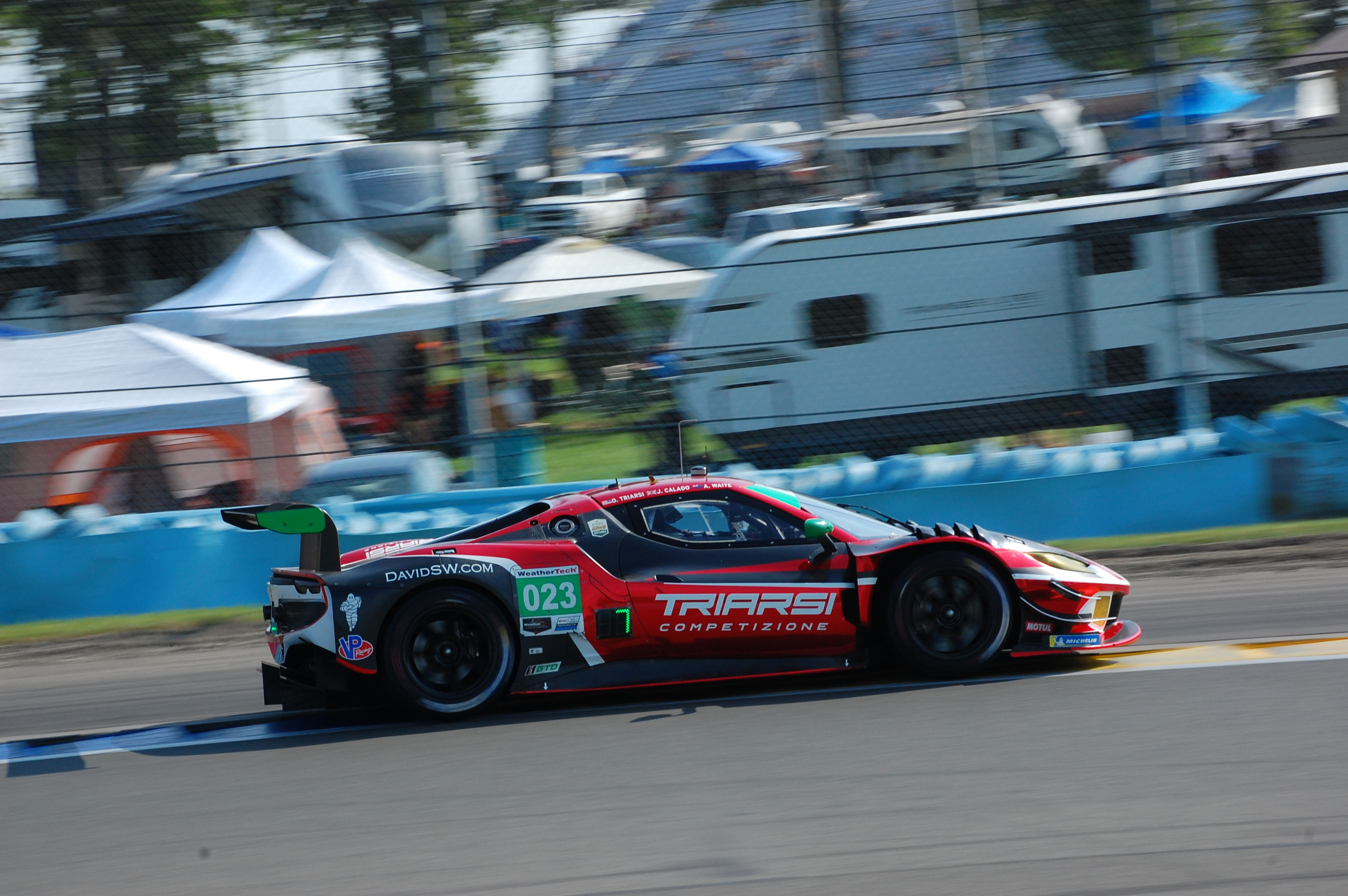
- Triarsi in 2025
- Nationality: (United States) American
- Born: December 17, 1994 (age 31) Short Hills, New Jersey, U.S.
- Categorisation: FIA Silver

Championship titles
- 2022 2012, 2013: GT World Challenge America – Am; Ferrari Challenge North America – Trofeo Pirelli

Onofrio Triarsi Jr. (born December 17, 1994) is an American businessman and racing driver who last competed in the GTD class of the IMSA SportsCar Championship for Triarsi Competizione.

== Personal life ==
Triarsi is the son of Onofrio Triarsi Sr., an Italian-born businessman, who founded Classic Coach Repair when he relocated to Orlando, Florida in 1965. Raised in the Short Hills section of Millburn, New Jersey, Triarsi graduated in 2013 from Millburn High School.

Alongside his racing career, Triarsi is the dealer principal of Triarsi Automotive, which manages a chain of various Italian car dealerships in Florida, started by his father Onofrio Sr. in 1972.

== Career ==
Triarsi began his racing career in 2012, competing in Ferrari Challenge North America. Racing full-time in the series in his debut year and 2013, Triarsi won the Trofeo Pirelli title in both years. Following that, Triarsi made select appearances in the series from 2014 to 2017, most notably finishing fifth in the Trofeo Pirelli standings in 2017.

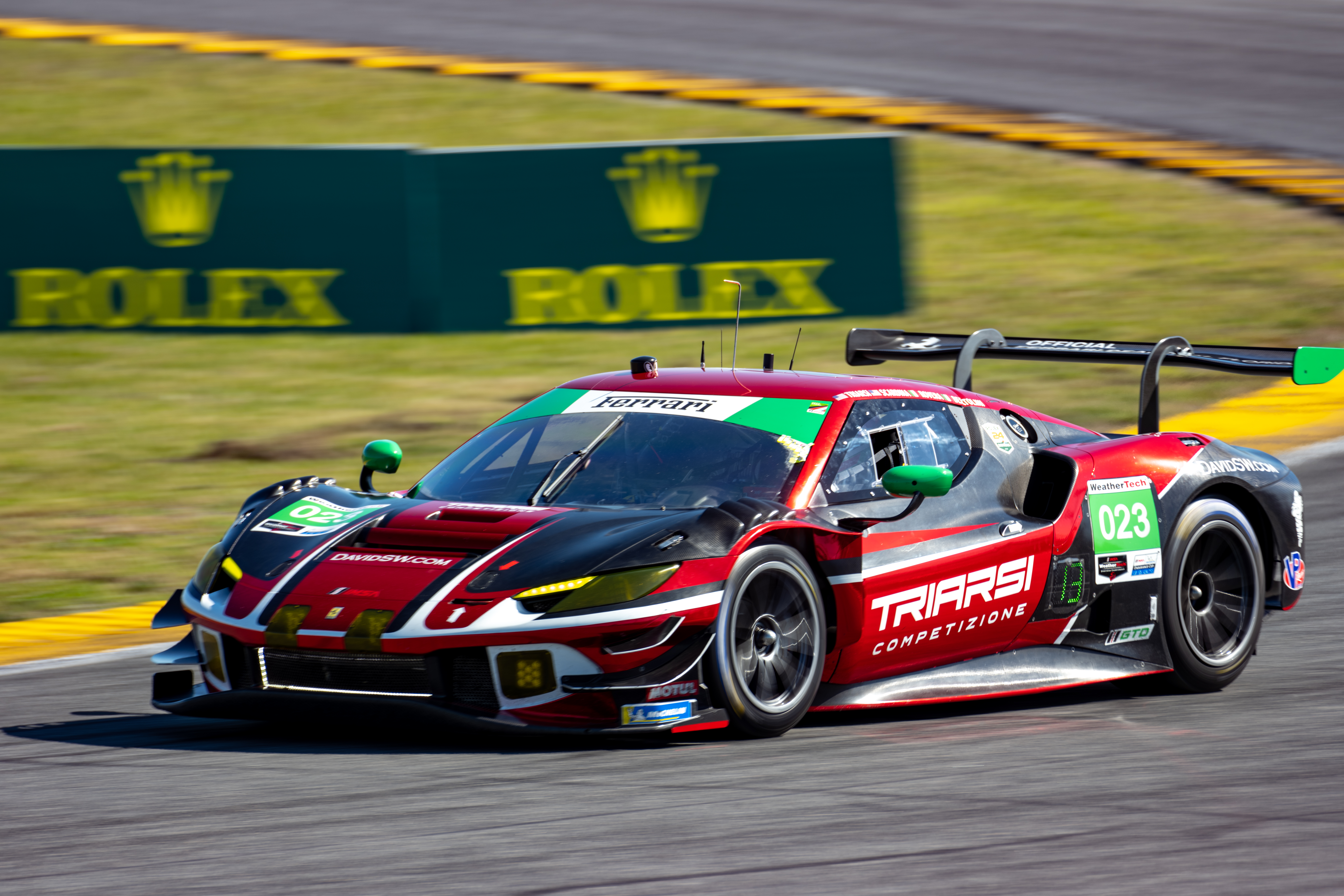
Triarsi's Ferrari 296 GT3, pictured at the 24 Hours of Daytona in 2023.

Four years later, Triarsi made a one-off return to racing by competing in the Sebring round of GT World Challenge America for his Ferrari-fielding Triarsi Competizione. Racing in the Am class alongside Charlie Scardina, Triarsi scored a class win in race one. Returning to the series for 2022, Triarsi won ten of the 12 races he contested in the Am class en route to the title, which he sealed with two rounds to go. During 2022, Triarsi also raced at the season-ending Indianapolis 8 Hours in Pro-Am, as well as making a one-off appearance in the GT America Series at Nashville, in which he won race one. The following year, Triarsi primarily raced in the endurance rounds of the IMSA SportsCar Championship in GTD for his own team, taking a best result of fourth at the Six Hours of The Glen. During 2023, Triarsi made a one-off return to Ferrari Challenge North America at Road America, winning race two, as well as racing with his own team at the Indianapolis 8 Hours, in which he was involved in a collision with Augusto Farfus with two and a half hours left to run.

In 2024, Triarsi solely raced in the endurance rounds of the IMSA SportsCar Championship, in which he took a best result of fourth at the 24 Hours of Daytona and Petit Le Mans. The following year, Triarsi originally had planned to contest the endurance rounds, but later added three more races to his schedule to accommodate Kenton Koch. In his first near full-season in IMSA, Triarsi took his maiden series win at Road America, and a pair of second-place finishes at VIR and Petit Le Mans en route to an eighth-place points finish. Triarsi then returned for the endurance rounds of the IMSA SportsCar Championship in 2026. In his fourth partial season in the series, Triarsi took a lone podium at Road America and finished 26th in GTD points.

== Racing record ==
=== Racing career summary ===
Season	Series	Team	Races	Wins	Poles	F/Laps	Podiums	Points	Position
2012	Ferrari Challenge North America – Trofeo Pirelli	Ferrari of Central Florida						258	**1st**
2013	Ferrari Challenge North America – Trofeo Pirelli	Ferrari of Central Florida						160	**1st**
2014	Ferrari Challenge North America – Trofeo Pirelli	Ferrari of Central Florida						15	20th
2016	Ferrari Challenge North America – Trofeo Pirelli	Ferrari of Central Florida	2	0	0	0	0	7	14th
2017	Ferrari Challenge North America – Trofeo Pirelli	Ferrari of Central Florida	4	0	0	0	0	34	5th
2021	GT World Challenge America – Am	Triarsi Competizione	2	1	1	0	1	25	**3rd**
2022	GT World Challenge America – Am	Triarsi Competizione	12	10	11	8	12	286	**1st**
2022	GT World Challenge America – Pro-Am	Triarsi Competizione	1	0	0	0	0	0	18th
2022	GT America Series – GT3	Triarsi Competizione	2	1	1	2	2	43	10th
2023	IMSA SportsCar Championship – GTD	Triarsi Competizione	4	0	0	0	0	863	34th
2023	Ferrari Challenge North America – Trofeo Pirelli	Ferrari of Central Florida	2	1	1	1	2	29	8th
2023	GT World Challenge America – Pro-Am	Triarsi Competizione	1	0	0	0	0	0	NC†
2024	IMSA SportsCar Championship – GTD	Triarsi Competizione	6	0	0	0	0	1344	25th
2025	IMSA SportsCar Championship – GTD	Triarsi Competizione	9	1	0	0	3	2472	8th
2026	IMSA SportsCar Championship – GTD	Triarsi Competizione	5	0	0	0	1	1264	26th

^{†} As Triarsi was a guest driver, he was ineligible to score points.

=== Complete IMSA SportsCar Championship results ===
(key) (Races in bold indicate pole position; results in italics indicate fastest lap)

Year	Team	Class	Make	Engine	1	2	3	4	5	6	7	8	9	10	11	Pos.	Points
2023	Triarsi Competizione	GTD	Ferrari 296 GT3	Ferrari F163CE 3.0 L Turbo V6	DAY; 10	SEB; 20	LBH	LGA	WGL; 4	MOS	LIM	ELK	VIR	IMS	PET; 10	34th	863
2024	Triarsi Competizione	GTD	Ferrari 296 GT3	Ferrari F163CE 3.0 L Turbo V6	DAY; 4	SEB; 14	LBH	LGA	WGL; 9	MOS	ELK; 12	VIR	IMS; 21	PET; 4		25th	1344
2025	Triarsi Competizione	GTD	Ferrari 296 GT3	Ferrari F163CE 3.0 L Turbo V6	DAY; 15	SEB; 20	LBH	LGA; 7	WGL; 4	MOS; 7	ELK; 1	VIR; 2	IMS; 7	PET; 2		8th	2472
2026	Triarsi Competizione	GTD	Ferrari 296 GT3 Evo	Ferrari F163CE 3.0 L Turbo V6	DAY; 7	SEB; 14	LGA	DET	WGL; 8	MOS	ELK; 2	VIR	IMS	PET; 9		26th	1264
