= Michael Dinan =

American racing driver (born 1998)

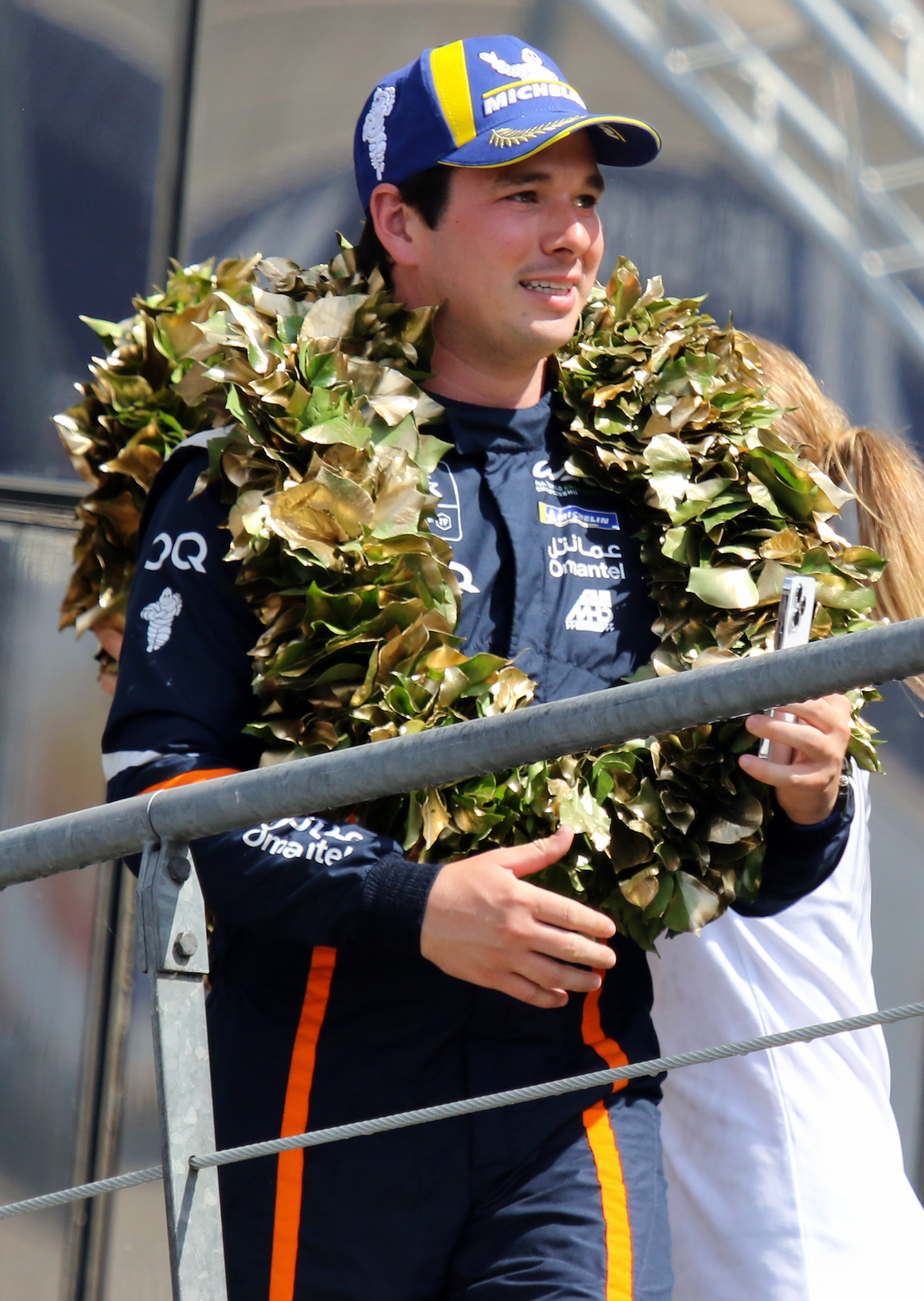
- Dinan in 2023
- Nationality: (United States) American
- Born: 25 June 1998 (age 28) Baltimore, Maryland, U.S.
- Relatives: Jamie Dinan (father)

FIA World Endurance Championship career
- Debut season: 2023
- Current team: ORT by TF
- Categorisation: FIA Silver
- Car number: 25
- Starts: 4 (4 entries)
- Wins: 0
- Podiums: 2
- Poles: 0
- Fastest laps: 0
- Best finish: TBD (LMGTE Am) in 2023

Michael Dinan (born 25 June 1998) is an American racing driver and car collector. He competed in the 2023 FIA World Endurance Championship with ORT by TF alongside Ahmad Al Harthy and Charlie Eastwood.

Dinan is the son of billionaire hedge fund manager Jamie Dinan.

== Racing record ==
=== Racing career summary ===
Season	Series	Team	Races	Wins	Poles	F/Laps	Podiums	Points	Position
2018	Pirelli World Challenge - SprintX - GTS ProAm	Flying Lizard Motorsports	2	0	0	0	0	3	60th
2018	Global Mazda-MX5 Cup	McCumbee McAleer Racing	6	0	0	0	0	6	34th
2019	Pirelli GT4 America Sprint - Am	Flying Lizard Motorsports	10	0	0	1	0	44	13th
2019	Pirelli GT4 America SprintX - Pro-Am	Flying Lizard Motorsports	11	0	0	0	3	82	4th
2020	Pirelli GT4 America SprintX - Pro-Am	Flying Lizard Motorsports	14	6	1	1	8	232	**1st**
2020	Pirelli GT4 America Sprint - Am	Flying Lizard Motorsports	15	11	3	6	13	323	**1st**
2021	GT World Challenge America - Pro Cup	Turner Motorsport	11	1	0	0	6	157	**3rd**
2021	International GT Open - Pro Cup	TF Sport	8	0	0	1	3	32	7th
2021	Le Mans Cup - GT3	Oman Racing Team with TF Sport	2	0	0	0	1	0	NC†
2022	GT World Challenge America - Pro Cup	Turner Motorsport	11	2	1	0	6	180	5th
2022	IMSA SportsCar Championship - GTD	Turner Motorsport	4	0	0	0	2	1100	23rd
2022	Michelin Pilot Challenge - GS	Turner Motorsport	1	0	0	0	0	260	51st
2022	GT World Challenge Europe Endurance Cup	Walkenhorst Motorsport	1	0	0	0	0	0	NC
2022	GT World Challenge Europe Endurance Cup - Gold	Walkenhorst Motorsport	1	0	0	0	0	18	19th
2023	FIA World Endurance Championship - LMGTE Am	ORT by TF	7	0	0	0	2	65	5th
2023	24 Hours of Le Mans - LMGTE Am	ORT by TF	1	0	0	0	1	N/A	**2nd**
2023	IMSA SportsCar Championship - GTD	Turner Motorsport	4	0	0	0	2	1044	25th
2023–24	Asian Le Mans Series - LMP2	TF Sport	5	0	0	0	0	42	8th
2024	IMSA SportsCar Championship - LMP2	Tower Motorsports	4	0	0	0	0	1007	26th

^{†} As Dinan was a guest driver, he was ineligible to score points.
^{*} Season still in progress.

=== GT4 America Sprint X Series results ===
(key) (Races in bold indicate pole position) (Races in italics indicate fastest lap)

Year	Team	Car	Class	1	2	3	4	5	6	7	8	9	10	11	12	13	14	15	16	Pos	Points
2019	Flying Lizard Motorsports	Porsche 718 Cayman GT4 Clubsport	Pro-Am	COA; 1; 4	COA; 2; 2	VIR; 1 Ret	VIR; 2 DNS	MOS; 1	MOS; 2	SON; 1	SON; 2	POR; 1; 6	POR; 2; 7	WGL; 1; 13	WGL; 2; 3	ROA; 1 Ret	ROA; 2; 5	LVS; 1 Ret	LVS; 2; 4	4th	97
2020	Flying Lizard Motorsports	Aston Martin Vantage AMR GT4	Pro-Am	COA1; 1; 8	COA1; 2; 2	VIR; 1; 5	VIR; 2; 6	VIR; 3; 13	SON; 1; 2	SON; 2; 2	SON; 3; 1	**ROA**; **1** Ret	ROA; 2; 1	ROA; 3; 2	COA2; 1; 2	COA2; 2 DNS	IMS; 1; 17	IMS; 2; 1		1st	232

=== GT World Challenge America results ===
(key) (Races in bold indicate pole position) (Races in italics indicate fastest lap)

Year	Team	Car	Class	1	2	3	4	5	6	7	8	9	10	11	12	13	Pos	Points
2021	Turner Motorsport	BMW M6 GT3	Pro	SON; 1; 9	SON; 2; 8	COA; 1; 3	COA; 2; 5	VIR; 1; 2	VIR; 2; 6	ROA; 1; 7	**ROA**; **2**; 1	WGL; 1; 2	WGL; 2; 4	SEB; 1 DNS	SEB; 2 Ret	IMS	3rd	157
2022	Turner Motorsport	BMW M4 GT3	Pro	SON; 1; 4	SON; 2; 4	NOL; 1; 15	NOL; 2 Ret	VIR; 1; 2	VIR; 2; 3	WGL; 1; 3	WGL; 2; 8	ROA; 1 Ret	ROA; 2 DNS	SEB; 1; 2	SEB; 2 WD	IMS; 1	5th	180

=== Complete FIA World Endurance Championship results ===
(key) (Races in bold indicate pole position) (Races in italics indicate fastest lap)

Year	Entrant	Class	Car	Engine	1	2	3	4	5	6	7	Rank	Points
2023	ORT by TF	LMGTE Am	Aston Martin Vantage AMR	Aston Martin M177 4.0 L Turbo V8	SEB; 9	PRT; 8	**SPA**; 3	LMS; 2	MNZ; 7	FUJ; 13	BHR; NC	5th	65

^{*} Season still in progress.

=== Complete 24 Hours of Le Mans results ===
Year	Team	Co-Drivers	Car	Class	Laps	Pos.	Class Pos.
2023	(Oman) ORT by TF	(Oman) Ahmad Al Harthy (Republic of Ireland) Charlie Eastwood	Aston Martin Vantage AMR	GTE; Am	312	28th	**2nd**

=== Complete Asian Le Mans Series results ===
(key) (Races in bold indicate pole position) (Races in italics indicate fastest lap)

Year	Team	Class	Car	Engine	1	2	3	4	5	Pos.	Points
2023–24	TF Sport	LMP2	Oreca 07	Gibson GK428 4.2 L V8	**SEP**; **1**; 7	**SEP**; **2**; 8	DUB; 5	ABU; 1; 4	ABU; 2; 6	8th	42
