= 2022 GT America Series =

Racing series

The 2022 GT America Series will be the second season of the SRO Motorsports Group's GT America Series, an auto racing series for grand tourer cars. The races are contested with GT2-spec, GT3-spec and GT4-spec cars. The season began on February 25 at St. Petersburg and finished on October 9 at Indianapolis.

== Calendar ==
The preliminary calendar was released on September 4, 2021, featuring seven rounds. On October 10, 2021, the SRO announced that the round at Virginia International Raceway would be postponed one week to avoid a clash with the 2022 24 Hours of Le Mans. In December, the SRO announced an additional round to be run alongside the Grand Prix of St. Petersburg in February.

| Round | Circuit | Date |
|---|---|---|
| 1 | (United States) St. Petersburg Street Circuit, St. Petersburg, Florida | February 25–27 |
| 2 | (United States) Sonoma Raceway, Sonoma, California | April 15–17 |
| 3 | (United States) Virginia International Raceway, Alton, Virginia | June 17–19 |
| 4 | (United States) Watkins Glen International, Watkins Glen, New York | July 22–24 |
| 5 | (United States) Nashville Street Circuit, Nashville, Tennessee | August 5–7 |
| 6 | (United States) Road America, Elkhart Lake, Wisconsin | August 19–21 |
| 7 | (United States) Sebring International Raceway, Sebring, Florida | September 23–25 |
| 8 | (United States) Indianapolis Motor Speedway, Indianapolis, Indiana | October 7–9 |

== Entry list ==
| Team | Car | No. | Drivers | Class | | Rounds |
| Team | Car | No. | Drivers | Car | Driver | Rounds |
|---|---|---|---|---|---|---|
| (United States) Team Hardpoint | Porsche 911 GT3 R | 00 | (United States) P. J. Hyett | GT3 | OV | 4 |
| (United States) CrowdStrike Racing by Riley Motorsports | Mercedes-AMG GT3 Evo | 04 | (United States) George Kurtz | GT3 | OV | All |
| (United States) Qelo Capital/ DXDT Racing | Mercedes-AMG GT3 Evo | 08 | (United States) Scott Smithson | GT3 | OV | 1, 5–7 |
| (United States) USALCO/ DXDT Racing | Mercedes-AMG GT3 Evo | 63 | (United States) David Askew | GT3 | OV | 1, 5–7 |
| (Japan) TGR Hattori Motorsports | Toyota GR Supra GT4 | 016 | (United States) Seth Lucas | GT4 | GT | 4, 6–8 |
| (United States) GMG Racing | Porsche 911 GT3 R | 032 | (United States) Kyle Washington | GT3 | OV | 2, 5–6, 8 |
| (United States) GMG Racing | Aston Martin Vantage AMR GT4 | 2 | (United States) Jason Bell | GT4 | GT | All |
| (United States) GMG Racing | Porsche 718 Cayman GT4 RS Clubsport | 71 | (United States) Jay Logan | GT4 | GT | 3, 6–8 |
| (United States) CrowdStrike Racing by GMG Racing | Audi R8 LMS GT2 | 58 | (United States) C.J. Moses | GT2 | GT | 1, 3, 5–6, 8 |
| (United States) Regal Motorsports LLC/Bartone Bros | Porsche 718 Cayman GT4 Clubsport MR | 3 | (United States) Andy Pilgrim | GT4 | GT | 5, 7 |
| (United States) Regal Motorsports LLC/Bartone Bros | Porsche 718 Cayman GT4 Clubsport MR | 427 | (United States) Anthony Bartone | GT4 | GT | 5, 7 |
| (United States) Flatrock Motorsports | Porsche 718 Cayman GT4 Clubsport MR | 7 | (United States) Rusty Bittle | GT4 | INV | 5 |
| (United States) Flying Lizard Motorsports | Aston Martin Vantage AMR GT4 | 8 | (United States) Elias Sabo | GT4 | GT | 2–4, 6–8 |
| (United States) TR3 Racing | Lamborghini Huracán GT3 Evo | 9 | (United States) Ziad Ghandour | GT3 | OV | 1 |
| (United States) Fast Track Racing | BMW M4 GT4 | 11 | (Canada) Jayson Clunie | GT4 | GT | 5 |
| (United States) BSport Racing | Aston Martin Vantage AMR GT4 | 15 | (United States) Bryan Putt | GT4 | GT | 1–2, 4, 7 |
| (United States) NOLASPORT | Porsche 718 Cayman GT4 RS Clubsport | 19 | (United States) Alain Stad | GT4 | GT | 2–3 |
| (United States) NOLASPORT | Porsche 718 Cayman GT4 RS Clubsport | 47 | (United States) Scott Noble | GT4 | GT | 8 |
| (United States) TGR Accelerating Performance (Note: Car No. 21 entered as Accelerating Performance from Rounds 1 to 2 and as Carrus Callus Raceteam from Round 3 onwards.) | Toyota GR Supra GT4 | 21 | (United States) Nick Shanny | GT4 | GT | All |
| (United States) TGR Accelerating Performance | Toyota GR Supra GT4 | 55 | (Fédération Internationale de l'Automobile) Moisey Uretsky (Note: Moisey Uretsky is Russian, but they compete as neutral competitors using the Fédération Internationale de l'Automobile flag as Russian national emblems were banned by the association due to the Russian invasion of Ukraine.) | GT4 | GT | 1–2 |
| (United States) Accelerating Performance | Aston Martin Vantage AMR GT4 | 55 | (Fédération Internationale de l'Automobile) Moisey Uretsky | GT4 | GT | 3–8 |
| (United States) SRQ Motorsports | BMW M4 GT4 | 22 | (Serbia) Marko Radisic | GT4 | GT | 1–5, 7 |
| (United States) SRQ Motorsports | BMW M4 GT4 | 28 | (United States) Rick Uhler | GT4 | GT | 1–5, 7 |
| (United States) Triarsi Competizione | Ferrari 488 GT3 Evo 2020 | 23 | (United States) Onofrio Triarsi | GT3 | OV | 5 |
| (United States) Triarsi Competizione | Ferrari 488 GT3 Evo 2020 | 37 | (United States) Justin Wetherill | GT3 | OV | All |
| (United States) Heart of Racing Team | Aston Martin Vantage AMR GT4 | 25 | (United States) Gray Newell | GT4 | GT | 1–6, 8 |
| (United States) Daskalos Motorsports | Audi R8 LMS | 27 | (United States) Jason Daskalos | GT3 | OV | All |
| (United States) Wright Motorsports | Porsche 718 Cayman GT4 RS Clubsport | 30 | (United States) Hutton McKenna | GT4 | GT | 2 |
| (United States) Forbush Performance | Toyota GR Supra GT4 | 33 | (United States) Matt Forbush | GT4 | GT | 5–6 |
| (United States) Conquest Racing | Mercedes-AMG GT4 | 35 | (Brazil) Custodio Toledo | GT4 | GT | 4, 6–8 |
| (United States) Cameron Racing | Mercedes-AMG GT4 | 39 | (United States) Chris Cagnazzi | GT4 | GT | 1–5 |
| (United States) Chouest Povoledo Racing | Aston Martin Vantage AMR GT4 | 50 | (United States) Ross Chouest | GT4 | GT | All |
| (United States) Auto Technic Racing | BMW M4 GT4 | 52 | (United States) Tom Capizzi | GT4 | GT | 8 |
| (United States) SKI Autosports | Ferrari 458 Italia GT3 | 56 | (United States) Andy Pilgrim | GT3 | OV | 3, 6, 8 |
| (United States) Dexter Racing | Ginetta G56 GT4 | 60 | (United States) Matthew Ibrahim | GT4 | GT | 3 |
| (United States) Scuderia Corsa | Ferrari 488 GT3 Evo 2020 | 62 | (United States) Bret Curtis | GT3 | OV | 5 |
| (United States) TRG - The Racer's Group | Porsche 718 Cayman GT4 Clubsport | 66 | (United States) Derek DeBoer | GT4 | GT | 1 |
| (United States) TGR Smooge Racing | Toyota GR Supra GT4 | 67 | (United States) Jose DaSilva | GT4 | GT | 2–4, 6–8 |
| (United States) TGR Smooge Racing | Toyota GR Supra GT4 | 69 | (United States) Todd Coleman | GT4 | GT | 1–2, 4–8 |
| (Germany) Mishumotors | Corvette C7 GT3-R | 70 | (Germany) Mirco Schultis | GT3 | OV | All |
| (United States) RENNtech Motorsports | Mercedes-AMG GT4 | 79 | (United States) Chris Gumprecht | GT4 | GT | 1–3, 5–8 |
| (United States) RENNtech Motorsports | Mercedes-AMG GT4 | 89 | (Brazil) Custodio Toledo | GT4 | GT | 1–2 |
| (United States) RENNtech Motorsports | Mercedes-AMG GT4 | 89 | (United States) Paul Kiebler | GT4 | GT | 3–4 |
| (United States) Zelus Motorsports | Lamborghini Huracán GT3 Evo | 88 | (United States) Jason Harward | GT3 | OV | All |
| (United States) Zelus Motorsports | Lamborghini Huracán GT3 Evo | 191 | (United States) Jeff Burton | GT3 | OV | All |
| (United States) Zelus Motorsports | Aston Martin Vantage AMR GT4 | 888 | (United States) Sean Whalen | GT4 | GT | 1–6 |
| (United States) Random Vandals Racing | BMW M4 GT4 | 98 | (United States) Paul Sparta | GT4 | GT | 1 |
| (United States) Rotek Racing (United States) ARG / Rotek Racing | Porsche 718 Cayman GT4 RS Clubsport | 99 | (United States) Robb Holland | GT4 | GT | 1–4, 6–8 |
| (United States) Rotek Racing (United States) ARG / Rotek Racing | Ford Mustang GT4 | 124 | (United States) Chris Allegro | GT4 | GT | 2–4, 6, 8 |
| (United States) Rotek Racing (United States) ARG / Rotek Racing | Ford Mustang GT4 | 124 | (Hong Kong) Edgar Lau | GT4 | GT | 5 |
| (United States) Premier Racing | Porsche 718 Cayman GT4 RS Clubsport | 120 | (United States) Adam Adelson | GT4 | GT | All |
| (United States) CarBahn with Peregrine Racing | Audi R8 LMS GT4 Evo | 930 | (United States) Steve Dinan | GT4 | GT | 2 |

| Icon | Class |
Car
| GT2 | GT2 Cars |
| GT3 | GT3 Current-Gen Cars |
| GT3 | GT3 Previous-Gen Cars |
| GT4 | GT4 Cars |
Drivers
| OV | Overall |
| GT | GT2 |
| GT | GT4 |
| INV | Invitational |

== Race results ==
Bold indicates overall winner

| Round | | Circuit | Pole position | SRO3 Winners | GT2 Winners | GT4 Winners |
|---|---|---|---|---|---|---|
| 1 | R1 | (United States) St. Petersburg | (United States) #27 Daskalos Motorsports | (United States) #27 Daskalos Motorsports | (United States) #58 CrowdStrike Racing by GMG Racing | (United States) #22 SRQ Motorsports |
| 1 | R1 | (United States) St. Petersburg | (United States) Jason Daskalos | (United States) Jason Daskalos | (United States) C.J. Moses | (Serbia) Marko Radisic |
| 1 | R2 | (United States) St. Petersburg | | (United States) #04 CrowdStrike Racing by Riley Motorsports | (United States) #58 CrowdStrike Racing by GMG Racing | (United States) #2 GMG Racing |
| 1 | R2 | (United States) St. Petersburg | | (United States) George Kurtz | (United States) C.J. Moses | (United States) Jason Bell |
| 2 | R1 | (United States) Sonoma | (United States) #27 Daskalos Motorsports | (United States) #27 Daskalos Motorsports | No Entries | (United States) #930 CarBahn with Peregrine Racing |
| 2 | R1 | (United States) Sonoma | (United States) Jason Daskalos | (United States) Jason Daskalos | No Entries | (United States) Steve Dinan |
| 2 | R2 | (United States) Sonoma | | (United States) #88 Zelus Motorsports | No Entries | (United States) #30 Wright Motorsports |
| 2 | R2 | (United States) Sonoma | | (United States) Jason Harward | No Entries | (United States) Hutton McKenna |
| 3 | R1 | (United States) Virginia | (United States) #04 CrowdStrike Racing by Riley Motorsports | (United States) #04 CrowdStrike Racing by Riley Motorsports | (United States) #58 CrowdStrike Racing by GMG Racing | (United States) #120 Premier Racing |
| 3 | R1 | (United States) Virginia | (United States) George Kurtz | (United States) George Kurtz | (United States) C.J. Moses | (United States) Adam Adelson |
| 3 | R2 | (United States) Virginia | | (United States) #04 CrowdStrike Racing by Riley Motorsports | (United States) #58 CrowdStrike Racing by GMG Racing | (United States) #55 Accelerating Performance |
| 3 | R2 | (United States) Virginia | | (United States) George Kurtz | (United States) C.J. Moses | (Fédération Internationale de l'Automobile) Moisey Uretsky |
| 4 | R1 | (United States) Watkins Glen | (United States) #04 CrowdStrike Racing by Riley Motorsports | (United States) #04 CrowdStrike Racing by Riley Motorsports | No Entries | (Japan) #016 Hattori Motorsports |
| 4 | R1 | (United States) Watkins Glen | (United States) George Kurtz | (United States) George Kurtz | No Entries | (United States) Seth Lucas |
| 4 | R2 | (United States) Watkins Glen | | (United States) #04 CrowdStrike Racing by Riley Motorsports | No Entries | (Japan) #016 Hattori Motorsports |
| 4 | R2 | (United States) Watkins Glen | | (United States) George Kurtz | No Entries | (United States) Seth Lucas |
| 5 | R1 | (United States) Nashville | (United States) #23 Triarsi Competizione | (United States) #23 Triarsi Competizione | No Entries | (United States) #99 Rotek Racing |
| 5 | R1 | (United States) Nashville | (United States) Onofrio Triarsi | (United States) Onofrio Triarsi | No Entries | (United States) Robb Holland |
| 5 | R2 | (United States) Nashville | | (United States) #37 Triarsi Competizione | No Entries | (United States) #99 Rotek Racing |
| 5 | R2 | (United States) Nashville | | (United States) Justin Wetherill | No Entries | (United States) Robb Holland |
| 6 | R1 | (United States) Road America | (United States) #88 Zelus Motorsports | (United States) #56 SKI Autosports | (United States) #58 CrowdStrike Racing by GMG Racing | (United States) #99 Rotek Racing |
| 6 | R1 | (United States) Road America | (United States) Jason Harward | (United States) Andy Pilgrim | (United States) C.J. Moses | (United States) Robb Holland |
| 6 | R2 | (United States) Road America | | (United States) #04 CrowdStrike Racing by Riley Motorsports | (United States) #58 CrowdStrike Racing by GMG Racing | (United States) #120 Premier Racing |
| 6 | R2 | (United States) Road America | | (United States) George Kurtz | (United States) C.J. Moses | (United States) Adam Adelson |
| 7 | R1 | (United States) Sebring | (United States) #88 Zelus Motorsports | (United States) #04 CrowdStrike Racing by Riley Motorsports | No Entries | (United States) #55 Accelerating Performance |
| 7 | R1 | (United States) Sebring | (United States) Jason Harward | (United States) George Kurtz | No Entries | (Fédération Internationale de l'Automobile) Moisey Uretsky |
| 7 | R2 | (United States) Sebring | | (United States) #04 CrowdStrike Racing by Riley Motorsports | No Entries | (United States) #8 Flying Lizard Motorsports |
| 7 | R2 | (United States) Sebring | | (United States) George Kurtz | No Entries | (United States) Elias Sabo |
| 8 | R1 | (United States) Indianapolis | (United States) #04 CrowdStrike Racing by Riley Motorsports | (United States) #04 CrowdStrike Racing by Riley Motorsports | (United States) #58 CrowdStrike Racing by GMG Racing | (United States) #50 Chouest Povoledo Racing |
| 8 | R1 | (United States) Indianapolis | (United States) George Kurtz | (United States) George Kurtz | (United States) C.J. Moses | (United States) Ross Chouest |
| 8 | R2 | (United States) Indianapolis | | (United States) #04 CrowdStrike Racing by Riley Motorsports | (United States) #58 CrowdStrike Racing by GMG Racing | (United States) #50 Chouest Povoledo Racing |
| 8 | R2 | (United States) Indianapolis | | (United States) George Kurtz | (United States) C.J. Moses | (United States) Ross Chouest |

== Championship Standings ==
Scoring system

Championship points are awarded for the first ten positions in each race. Entries are required to complete 75% of the winning car's race distance in order to be classified and earn points.

| Position | **1st** | **2nd** | **3rd** | **4th** | **5th** | **6th** | **7th** | **8th** | **9th** | **10th** |
| Points | 25 | 18 | 15 | 12 | 10 | 8 | 6 | 4 | 2 | 1 |

=== Drivers' Championships ===
==== SRO3 ====
| Pos. | Driver | Team | STP (United States) | | SON (United States) | | VIR (United States) | | WGL (United States) | | NSH (United States) | | ELK (United States) | | SEB (United States) | | IND (United States) | | Points |
| Pos. | Driver | Team | RD1 | RD2 | RD1 | RD2 | RD1 | RD2 | RD1 | RD2 | RD1 | RD2 | RD1 | RD2 | RD1 | RD2 | RD1 | RD2 | Points |
|---|---|---|---|---|---|---|---|---|---|---|---|---|---|---|---|---|---|---|---|
| 1 | (United States) George Kurtz | (United States) CrowdStrike Racing by Riley Motorsports | 3 | 1 | 2 | 10 | **1** | 1 | **1** | 1 | 4 | 4 | 2 | 1 | 1 | 1 | 1 | 1 | 333 |
| 2 | (United States) Jason Daskalos | (United States) Daskalos Motorsports | **1** | Ret | **1** | 2 | 5 | 3 | 17 | 5 | 3 | 5 | Ret | 4 | 21 | Ret | 16† | 5 | 182 |
| 3 | (Germany) Mirco Schultis | (Germany) Mishumotors | 7 | Ret | 4 | 4 | 8 | 4 | Ret | 4 | 8 | 3 | 3 | 3 | 3 | 3 | 3 | 2 | 172 |
| 4 | (United States) Jason Harward | (United States) Zelus Motorsports | Ret | Ret | 3 | 1 | 3 | Ret | 14 | 2 | 7 | Ret | **22** | 5 | **2** | 2 | Ret | Ret | 147 |
| 5 | (United States) Jeff Burton | (United States) Zelus Motorsports | Ret | 6 | 5 | 3 | 2 | 7 | 2 | DNS | | | | | 4 | 4 | **2** | 4 | 131 |
| 6 | (United States) Justin Wetherill | (United States) Triarsi Competizione | 6 | 3 | 7 | 5 | 6 | 5 | Ret | 3 | 2 | 1 | | | | | | | 115 |
| 7 | (United States) Andy Pilgrim | (United States) SKI Autosports | | | | | 4 | 2 | | | | | 1 | 2 | | | DNS | 3 | 88 |
| 8 | (United States) Scott Smithson | (United States) Qelo Capital / DXDT Racing | 2 | 2 | | | | | | | 5 | 6 | DNS | DNS | | | | | 54 |
| 9 | (United States) Kyle Washington | (United States) GMG Racing | | | 6 | 21 | | | | | 9 | 8 | 4 | 6 | | | Ret | 6 | 48 |
| 10 | (United States) Onofrio Triarsi | (United States) Triarsi Competizione | | | | | | | | | **1** | 2 | | | | | | | 43 |
| 11 | (United States) David Askew | (United States) USALCO / DXDT Racing | 4 | 5 | | | | | | | 6 | 7 | DNS | DNS | | | | | 36 |
| 12 | (United States) Ziad Ghandour | (United States) TR3 Racing | 5 | 4 | | | | | | | | | | | | | | | 22 |
| 13 | (United States) PJ Hyett | (United States) Team Hardpoint | | | | | | | 3 | Ret | | | | | | | | | 15 |
| Pos. | Driver | Team | STP (United States) | | SON (United States) | | VIR (United States) | | WGL (United States) | | NSH (United States) | | ELK (United States) | | SEB (United States) | | IND (United States) | | Points |

Key
| Colour | Result |
|---|---|
| Gold | Race winner |
| Silver | 2nd place |
| Bronze | 3rd place |
| Green | Points finish |
| Blue | Non-points finish |
| Blue | Non-classified finish (NC) |
| Purple | Did not finish (Ret) |
| Black | Disqualified (DSQ) |
| Black | Excluded (EX) |
| White | Did not start (DNS) |
| White | Race cancelled (C) |
| White | Withdrew (WD) |
| Blank | Did not participate |

**Bold** – Pole
Italics – Fastest Lap

==== GT2 ====
| Pos. | Driver | Team | STP (United States) | | SON (United States) | | VIR (United States) | | WGL (United States) | | NSH (United States) | | ELK (United States) | | SEB (United States) | | IND (United States) | | Points |
| Pos. | Driver | Team | RD1 | RD2 | RD1 | RD2 | RD1 | RD2 | RD1 | RD2 | RD1 | RD2 | RD1 | RD2 | RD1 | RD2 | RD1 | RD2 | Points |
|---|---|---|---|---|---|---|---|---|---|---|---|---|---|---|---|---|---|---|---|
| 1 | (United States) C.J. Moses | (United States) CrowdStrike Racing by GMG Racing | **13** | 7 | | | **7** | 6 | | | | | 5 | 7 | | | **4** | 8 | 100 |
| Pos. | Driver | Team | STP (United States) | | SON (United States) | | VIR (United States) | | WGL (United States) | | NSH (United States) | | ELK (United States) | | SEB (United States) | | IND (United States) | | Points |

==== GT4 ====
| Pos. | Driver | Team | STP (United States) | | SON (United States) | | VIR (United States) | | WGL (United States) | | NSH (United States) | | ELK (United States) | | SEB (United States) | | IND (United States) | | Points |
| Pos. | Driver | Team | RD1 | RD2 | RD1 | RD2 | RD1 | RD2 | RD1 | RD2 | RD1 | RD2 | RD1 | RD2 | RD1 | RD2 | RD1 | RD2 | Points |
|---|---|---|---|---|---|---|---|---|---|---|---|---|---|---|---|---|---|---|---|
| 1 | (United States) Ross Chouest | (United States) Chouest Povoledo Racing | 11 | 14 | 12 | 9 | 14 | 12 | 5 | 7 | 11 | Ret | 10 | 14 | 16 | 13 | 5 | 7 | 182 |
| 2 | (United States) Jason Bell | (United States) GMG Racing | 12 | 9 | 25 | 8 | 11 | 10 | 6 | 12 | 14 | 11 | 12 | 20 | 22 | 6 | 7 | 10 | 176 |
| 3 | (United States) Adam Adelson | (United States) Premier Racing | | 16 | 21 | 11 | 9 | 17 | 7 | Ret | 13 | 13 | 7 | 8 | 6 | 7 | Ret | 20 | 150 |
| 4 | (Fédération Internationale de l'Automobile) Moisey Uretsky | (United States) Accelerating Performance | 10 | 11 | Ret | 13 | **10** | 8 | 13 | Ret | | | Ret | 9 | 5 | 8 | 13 | 12 | 147 |
| 5 | (United States) Robb Holland | (United States) Rotek Racing | | | 14 | 12 | 20 | 9 | 10 | 13 | 10 | 9 | 6 | 18 | 13 | 12 | 14 | 15 | 132 |
| 6 | (United States) Seth Lucas | (Japan) TGR Hattori Motorsports | | | | | | | 4 | 6 | | | 8 | 16 | 12 | 10 | 6 | 9 | 115 |
| 7 | (United States) Gray Newell | (United States) Heart of Racing Team | 15 | 13 | 11 | Ret | 17 | 11 | 9 | 11 | Ret | 16 | 15 | 19 | | | 8 | 11 | 83 |
| 8 | (United States) Elias Sabo | (United States) Flying Lizard Motorsports | | | 15 | DNS | 13 | 13 | 21 | 19 | | | 11 | 15 | 9 | 5 | Ret | 14 | 75 |
| 9 | (United States) Todd Coleman | (United States) TGR Smooge Racing | 21 | Ret | 9 | 20 | | | 11 | 9 | Ret | | 14 | 10 | 15 | 16 | 10 | 13 | 70 |
| 10 | (Serbia) Marko Radisic | (United States) SRQ Motorsports | 8 | 12 | 17 | 14 | 21† | 14 | 22 | | 20 | 18 | | | 14 | 9 | | | 60 |
| 11 | (United States) Bryan Putt | (United States) BSport Racing | Ret | Ret | **23** | Ret | | | 8 | 10 | | | 9 | 17 | 8 | 11 | | | 53 |
| 12 | (United States) Chris Cagnazzi | (United States) Cameron Racing | **Ret** | DNS | 16 | 7 | 15 | 22 | 12 | Ret | 17 | 10 | | | | | | | 50 |
| 13 | (United States) Hutton McKenna | (United States) Wright Motorsports | | | 13 | 6 | | | | | | | | | | | | | 35 |
| 14 | (United States) Chris Gumprecht | (United States) RENNtech Motorsports | 16 | 10 | DNS | DNS | 12 | Ret | | | | | | | | | | | 34 |
| 15 | (United States) Andy Pilgrim | (United States) Regal Motorsports LLC/Bartone Bros | | | | | | | | | 15 | 14 | | | 7 | 14 | | | 32 |
| 16 | (United States) Jose DaSilva | (United States) TGR Smooge Racing | | | 10 | 15 | 16 | 15 | 23 | Ret | | | 13 | Ret | 17 | 19 | | | 29 |
| 17 | (Hong Kong) Edgar Lau | (United States) ARG / Rotek Racing | | | | | | | | | 12 | 12 | | | | | | | 27 |
| 18 | (United States) Steve Dinan | (United States) CarBahn with Peregrine Racing | | | 8 | Ret | | | | | | | | | | | | | 25 |
| 19 | (United States) Jay Logan | (United States) GMG Racing | | | | | 23† | 16 | | | | | 20 | 11 | 19 | 17 | 11 | 17 | 22 |
| 20 | (Brazil) Custodio Toledo | (United States) RENNtech Motorsports | 19 | 19 | 18 | 18 | | | 16 | 14 | | | | Ret | 11 | Ret | 9 | 21 | 20 |
| 21 | (United States) Anthony Bartone | (United States) Regal Motorsports LLC/Bartone Bros | | | | | | | | | 16 | 15 | | | 10 | 15 | | | 20 |
| 22 | (United States) Derek DeBoer | (United States) TRG - The Racer's Group | 9 | 21† | | | | | | | | | | | | | | | 18 |
| 23 | (United States) Nick Shanny | (United States) TGR Accelerating Performance | 18 | 18 | 20 | Ret | Ret | 21 | 18 | 18 | 23 | 20 | 21 | 13 | 18 | 18 | 12 | 18 | 15 |
| 24 | (United States) Paul Sparta | (United States) Random Vandals Racing | 14 | 15 | | | | | | | | | | | | | | | 14 |
| 25 | (United States) Matt Forbush | (United States) Forbush Performance | | | | | | | | | 21 | 17 | 16 | 12 | | | | | 12 |
| 26 | (United States) Sean Whalen | (United States) Zelus Motorsports | 17 | 17 | Ret | 16 | 22† | 18 | 20 | 16 | 18 | 23 | 17 | 21 | | | | | 8 |
| 27 | (United States) Chris Allegro | (United States) ARG / Rotek Racing | | | 22 | 17 | DSQ | 20 | 15 | 15 | | | 19 | Ret | | | | 19 | 2 |
| 28= | (United States) Paul Kiebler | (United States) RENNtech Motorsports | | | | | 18 | Ret | Ret | DNS | | | | | | | | | 1 |
| 28= | (Canada) Jayson Clunie | (United States) Fast Track Racing | | | | | | | | | 19 | 22 | | | | | | | 1 |
| 30= | (United States) Rick Uhler | (United States) SRQ Motorsports | 20 | 20 | 24 | 19 | 19 | 19 | 19 | 17 | 24 | 21 | | | 20 | 20 | | | 0 |
| 30= | (United States) Alain Stad | (United States) NOLASPORT | | | 19 | Ret | DNS | DNS | | | | | | | | | | | 0 |
| 30= | (United States) Matthew Ibrahim | (United States) Dexter Racing | | | | | Ret | 23 | | | | | | | | | | | 0 |
Ineligible to score points
| | (United States) Scott Noble | (United States) NOLASPORT | | | | | | | | | | | | | | | 15 | DNS | - |
| | (United States) Tom Capizzi | (United States) Auto Technic Racing | | | | | | | | | | | | | | | | 16 | - |
| Pos. | Driver | Team | STP (United States) | | SON (United States) | | VIR (United States) | | WGL (United States) | | NSH (United States) | | ELK (United States) | | SEB (United States) | | IND (United States) | | Points |

Notes:

- † – Driver did not finish the race but was classified, as he completed more than 75% of the race distance.
