= 2022 GT World Challenge America =

Motor racing competition

The 2022 Fanatec GT World Challenge America Powered by AWS was the sixteenth season of the United States Auto Club's GT World Challenge America, and the fifth under ownership of SRO Motorsports Group.The season began at Sonoma Raceway on April 15, and ended at Indianapolis Motor Speedway on October 8.

K-PAX Racing and Andrea Caldarelli won the Pro category Teams' and Drivers' Championships for the second consecutive year, as Lamborghini won the Manufacturers' Championship. Racers Edge Motorsports, Mario Farnbacher, and Ashton Harrison won the Pro/Am Championships, as Harrison became the first woman to win a series championship in any category of GT World Challenge America. Triarsi Competizione, Onofrio Triarsi, and Charlie Scardina won the Am Championships as the only team in the category to participate in every round.

== Calendar ==
The preliminary calendar was released on September 4, 2021, without disclosing the location of round two. On October 10, 2021, the SRO announced that Ozarks International Raceway would fill the vacancy in the schedule, pending FIA circuit homologation. The round at Virginia International Raceway was also postponed one week to avoid a clash with the 2022 24 Hours of Le Mans.

On April 27, 2022, the SRO announced that the second round at Ozarks was relocated to NOLA Motorsports Park, due to the challenges related with infrastructure and supply chain.

The Indianapolis 8 Hours once again served as the final round of the GT World Challenge America season. However, unlike the 2021 race where points were paid after three hours of racing to eligible teams, championship points would be paid at the end of the eight-hour distance.

Round	Circuit	Date
1	(United States) Sonoma Raceway, Sonoma, California	April 15–17
2	(United States) NOLA Motorsports Park, Avondale, Louisiana	May 20–22
3	(United States) Virginia International Raceway, Alton, Virginia	June 17–19
4	(United States) Watkins Glen International, Watkins Glen, New York	July 22–24
5	(United States) Road America, Elkhart Lake, Wisconsin	August 19–21
6	(United States) Sebring International Raceway, Sebring, Florida	September 23–25
7	(United States) Indianapolis Motor Speedway, Indianapolis, Indiana	October 7–9

Also part of the Intercontinental GT Challenge

== Entry list ==
Team	Car	No.	Drivers	Class	Rounds
(United States) Team Hardpoint	Porsche 911 GT3 R	00	(United States) P. J. Hyett	PA	4
(United States) Team Hardpoint	Porsche 911 GT3 R	00	(United States) Gunnar Jeannette	PA	4
(United States) CrowdStrike Racing by Riley Motorsports	Mercedes-AMG GT3 Evo	04	(United States) Colin Braun	PA	All
(United States) CrowdStrike Racing by Riley Motorsports	Mercedes-AMG GT3 Evo	04	(United States) George Kurtz	PA	All
(United States) CrowdStrike Racing by Riley Motorsports	Mercedes-AMG GT3 Evo	04	(United States) Ben Keating	PA	7
(United States) Qelo Capital/ DXDT Racing	Mercedes-AMG GT3 Evo	08	(United States) Bryan Sellers	PA	1–6
(United States) Qelo Capital/ DXDT Racing	Mercedes-AMG GT3 Evo	08	(United States) Scott Smithson	PA	1–6
(United States) Qelo Capital/ DXDT Racing	Mercedes-AMG GT3 Evo	08	(United States) David Askew	Am	7
(United States) Qelo Capital/ DXDT Racing	Mercedes-AMG GT3 Evo	08	(Germany) Valentin Pierburg	Am	7
(United States) Qelo Capital/ DXDT Racing	Mercedes-AMG GT3 Evo	08	(United States) Scott Smithson	Am	7
(United States) USALCO/ DXDT Racing	Mercedes-AMG GT3 Evo	63	(United States) David Askew	PA	1–6
(United States) USALCO/ DXDT Racing	Mercedes-AMG GT3 Evo	63	(Germany) Dirk Müller	PA	1–6
(United States) USALCO/ DXDT Racing	Mercedes-AMG GT3 Evo	63	(Germany) Patrick Assenheimer	P	7
(United States) USALCO/ DXDT Racing	Mercedes-AMG GT3 Evo	63	(Germany) Dirk Müller	P	7
(United States) USALCO/ DXDT Racing	Mercedes-AMG GT3 Evo	63	(United States) Bryan Sellers	P	7
(United States) GMG Racing	Porsche 911 GT3 R	032	(United States) James Sofronas	Am	5
(United States) GMG Racing	Porsche 911 GT3 R	032	(United States) Kyle Washington	Am	5
(United States) GMG Racing	Porsche 911 GT3 R	32	(Austria) Klaus Bachler	PA	7
(United States) GMG Racing	Porsche 911 GT3 R	32	(United States) James Sofronas	PA	7
(United States) GMG Racing	Porsche 911 GT3 R	32	(United States) Kyle Washington	PA	7
(United States) K-PAX Racing	Lamborghini Huracán GT3 Evo	1	(Italy) Andrea Caldarelli	P	All
(United States) K-PAX Racing	Lamborghini Huracán GT3 Evo	1	(South Africa) Jordan Pepper	P	1
(United States) K-PAX Racing	Lamborghini Huracán GT3 Evo	1	(Italy) Michele Beretta	P	2–7
(United States) K-PAX Racing	Lamborghini Huracán GT3 Evo	1	(Italy) Marco Mapelli	P	7
(United States) K-PAX Racing	Lamborghini Huracán GT3 Evo	3	(Canada) Misha Goikhberg	P	All
(United States) K-PAX Racing	Lamborghini Huracán GT3 Evo	3	(Italy) Giacomo Altoè	P	1
(United States) K-PAX Racing	Lamborghini Huracán GT3 Evo	3	(South Africa) Jordan Pepper	P	2–7
(United States) K-PAX Racing	Lamborghini Huracán GT3 Evo	3	(France) Franck Perera	P	7
(United States) SADA Systems/USRT	Mercedes-AMG GT3 Evo	6	(United States) Steven Aghakhani	P	1–5, 7
(United States) SADA Systems/USRT	Mercedes-AMG GT3 Evo	6	(Italy) Loris Spinelli	P	1–5, 7
(United States) SADA Systems/USRT	Mercedes-AMG GT3 Evo	6	(France) Tristan Vautier	P	7
(United States) TR3 Racing	Lamborghini Huracán GT3 Evo	9	(Lebanon) Ziad Ghandour	PA	1–3
(United States) TR3 Racing	Lamborghini Huracán GT3 Evo	9	(Italy) Michele Beretta	PA	1
(United States) TR3 Racing	Lamborghini Huracán GT3 Evo	9	(Italy) Giacomo Altoè	PA	2–3
(United States) TR3 Racing	Lamborghini Huracán GT3 Evo	91	(United States) Jeff Burton	PA	5–7
(United States) TR3 Racing	Lamborghini Huracán GT3 Evo	91	(United States) Corey Lewis	PA	5–7
(United States) TR3 Racing	Lamborghini Huracán GT3 Evo	91	(United States) Jon Branam	PA	7
(United States) Ian Lacy Racing with G3 Racing	Aston Martin Vantage AMR GT3	12	(United States) Frank Gannett	PA	1–6
(United States) Ian Lacy Racing with G3 Racing	Aston Martin Vantage AMR GT3	12	(United States) Drew Staveley	PA	1–6
(United States) Triarsi Competizione	Ferrari 488 GT3 Evo 2020	13	(United Kingdom) Ryan Dalziel	PA	All
(United States) Triarsi Competizione	Ferrari 488 GT3 Evo 2020	13	(United States) Justin Wetherill	PA	All
(United States) Triarsi Competizione	Ferrari 488 GT3 Evo 2020	13	(United States) Conrad Grunewald	PA	7
(United States) Triarsi Competizione	Ferrari 488 GT3 Evo 2020	23	(United States) Charlie Scardina	Am	1–6
(United States) Triarsi Competizione	Ferrari 488 GT3 Evo 2020	23	(United States) Onofrio Triarsi	Am	1–6
(United States) Triarsi Competizione	Ferrari 488 GT3 Evo 2020	23	(Italy) Alessio Rovera	PA	7
(United States) Triarsi Competizione	Ferrari 488 GT3 Evo 2020	23	(United States) Charlie Scardina	PA	7
(United States) Triarsi Competizione	Ferrari 488 GT3 Evo 2020	23	(United States) Onofrio Triarsi	PA	7
(United States) Winward Racing	Mercedes-AMG GT3 Evo	33	(United Kingdom) Philip Ellis	P	1, 4–5, 7
(United States) Winward Racing	Mercedes-AMG GT3 Evo	33	(United States) Russell Ward	P	1, 4–5, 7
(United States) Winward Racing	Mercedes-AMG GT3 Evo	33	(France) Jules Gounon	P	7
(United States) Conquest Racing	Ferrari 488 GT3 Evo 2020	34	(Italy) Alessandro Balzan	P	6–7
(United States) Conquest Racing	Ferrari 488 GT3 Evo 2020	34	(United States) Manny Franco	P	6
(United States) Conquest Racing	Ferrari 488 GT3 Evo 2020	34	(Italy) Daniel Mancinelli	P	7
(United States) Conquest Racing	Ferrari 488 GT3 Evo 2020	34	(Monaco) Cédric Sbirrazzuoli	P	7
(Canada) ST Racing	BMW M4 GT3	38	(Canada) Samantha Tan	PA	1, 3
(Canada) ST Racing	BMW M4 GT3	38	(Canada) Nick Wittmer	PA	1, 3
(Canada) ST Racing	BMW M4 GT3	38	(Canada) Samantha Tan	S	7
(Canada) ST Racing	BMW M4 GT3	38	(Canada) Nick Wittmer	S	7
(Canada) ST Racing	BMW M4 GT3	38	(United States) Harry Gottsacker	S	7
(United States) Hero Life with Stephen Cameron Racing	Mercedes-AMG GT3 Evo	39	(United States) Chris Cagnazzi	PA	7
(United States) Hero Life with Stephen Cameron Racing	Mercedes-AMG GT3 Evo	39	(United States) Guy Cosmo	PA	7
(United States) Hero Life with Stephen Cameron Racing	Mercedes-AMG GT3 Evo	39	(United States) Shane Lewis	PA	7
(United States) RealTime Racing	Acura NSX GT3 Evo2	43	(United States) Michael Cooper	PA	All
(United States) RealTime Racing	Acura NSX GT3 Evo2	43	(United States) Erin Vogel	PA	All
(United States) RealTime Racing	Acura NSX GT3 Evo2	43	(United States) Taylor Hagler	PA	7
(United States) Wright Motorsports	Porsche 911 GT3 R	45	(Belgium) Jan Heylen	PA	All
(United States) Wright Motorsports	Porsche 911 GT3 R	45	(United States) Charlie Luck	PA	All
(United States) Wright Motorsports	Porsche 911 GT3 R	45	(Germany) Elia Erhart	PA	7
(Italy) AF Corse	Ferrari 488 GT3 Evo 2020	61	(United States) Conrad Grunewald	Am	1–3
(Italy) AF Corse	Ferrari 488 GT3 Evo 2020	61	(United States) Jean-Claude Saada	Am	1–3
(United States) Zelus Motorsports	Lamborghini Huracán GT3 Evo	88	(United States) Jason Harward	PA	1–4
(United States) Zelus Motorsports	Lamborghini Huracán GT3 Evo	88	(United States) Madison Snow	PA	1–4
(United States) Zelus Motorsports	Lamborghini Huracán GT3 Evo	88	(United States) Jason Daskalos	Am	7
(United States) Zelus Motorsports	Lamborghini Huracán GT3 Evo	88	(United States) Jason Harward	Am	7
(United States) Zelus Motorsports	Lamborghini Huracán GT3 Evo	88	(United States) Seth Lucas	Am	7
(United States) Zelus Motorsports	Lamborghini Huracán GT3 Evo	91	(United States) Jeff Burton	PA	2–3
(United States) Zelus Motorsports	Lamborghini Huracán GT3 Evo	91	(United States) Corey Lewis	PA	2–3
(United States) Zelus Motorsports	Lamborghini Huracán GT3 Evo	191	(United States) Jeff Burton	PA	1, 4
(United States) Zelus Motorsports	Lamborghini Huracán GT3 Evo	191	(United States) Corey Lewis	PA	1, 4
(United States) Racers Edge Motorsports	Acura NSX GT3 Evo22	93	(Germany) Mario Farnbacher	PA	All
(United States) Racers Edge Motorsports	Acura NSX GT3 Evo22	93	(United States) Ashton Harrison	PA	All
(United States) Racers Edge Motorsports	Acura NSX GT3 Evo22	93	(Denmark) Christina Nielsen	PA	7
(United States) Bimmerworld Racing	BMW M4 GT3	94	(United States) Bill Auberlen	PA	All
(United States) Bimmerworld Racing	BMW M4 GT3	94	(United States) Chandler Hull	PA	All
(United States) Bimmerworld Racing	BMW M4 GT3	94	(United States) Richard Heistand	PA	7
(United States) Turner Motorsport	BMW M4 GT3	96	(United States) Michael Dinan	P	All
(United States) Turner Motorsport	BMW M4 GT3	96	(United States) Robby Foley	P	All
(United States) Turner Motorsport	BMW M4 GT3	96	(United States) John Edwards	P	7
(United States) Andretti Autosport x Vital Speed	Ferrari 488 GT3	218	(United States) Jarett Andretti	P	7
(United States) Andretti Autosport x Vital Speed	Ferrari 488 GT3	218	(Australia) Ryan Briscoe	P	7
(United States) Andretti Autosport x Vital Speed	Ferrari 488 GT3	218	(United States) Jeff Westphal	P	7

Icon	Class
P	Pro Cup
PA	Pro/Am Cup
Am	Am Cup

=== Mid-season changes ===
- On May 10, the Pro category requirements were updated to require one Silver graded driver on every eligible team, beginning from the second race meeting at NOLA Motorsports Park. This forced the following changes within the line-ups at Lamborghini Squadra Corse teams:
  - The 2021 Pro Championship winning lineup of Andrea Caldarelli and Jordan Pepper were separated, with Pepper moving to the #3 K-PAX Racing entry to join Misha Goikhberg.
  - Giacomo Altoè moved from the #3 K-PAX Racing team to Pro/Am team TR3 Racing, alongside Ziad Ghandour for the NOLA and VIR rounds.
  - Michele Beretta moved from TR3 Racing into the #1 K-PAX Racing entry to join Caldarelli.
- K-PAX Racing's #3 car and Turner Motorsport were moved from Pro/Am to Pro prior to the start of the first race at Sonoma Raceway, following a review of Misha Goikhberg and Michael Dinan's driver rating derogations.
- Jean-Claude Saada, Conrad Grunewald, and the #61 AF Corse entry did not race after an accident in the first race at VIR. Grunewald would later join Triarsi Competizione for the Indianapolis 8 Hours, driving their #13 Ferrari 488 GT3.
- Jeff Burton and Corey Lewis joined TR3 Racing from Zelus Motorsports at Road America, replacing Ghandour and Altoè in their Lamborghini Huracán GT3.
- Team Hardpoint entered Watkins Glen as a one-off entry with drivers PJ Hyett and Gunnar Jeannette driving a Porsche 911 GT3-R. An incident for Hyett in GT America race two forced them to withdraw from that afternoon's GT World Challenge America race.
- GMG Racing entered Road America with a Porsche 911 GT3-R for James Sofronas and Kyle Washington.
- Zelus Motorsports did not enter Road America and Sebring. Madison Snow did not rejoin the team when they returned for the Indianapolis 8 Hours.
- Conquest Racing joined the series from Sebring. They were moved from Pro/Am to Pro prior to the start of the first race, following a review of Manny Franco's driver rating derogation.
- Andretti Autosport x Vital Speed and Cameron Racing joined the series at the Indianapolis 8 Hours.
- For the Indianapolis 8 Hours, DXDT Racing moved both of their cars out of Pro/Am, and entered their #63 Mercedes-AMG GT3 into the Pro category, and their #08 car into the Am category. Triarsi Competizione's #23 Ferrari was moved from Am to Pro/Am. GMG Racing's #32 Porsche also moved from Am to Pro/Am, while Zelus Motorsports moved their #88 Lamborghini from Pro/Am to Am. ST Racing moved their #38 BMW from Pro/Am to be the only Silver Cup entry in the race.

== Race results ==
Bold indicates overall winner.

Round		Circuit	Pole position	Pro Winners	Silver Winners	Pro/Am Winners	Am Winners	Ref.
1	R1	(United States) Sonoma	(United States) #1 K-PAX Racing	**(United States) #1 K-PAX Racing**	No Entries	(United States) #45 Wright Motorsports	(Italy) #61 AF Corse	
1	R1	(United States) Sonoma	(South Africa) Jordan Pepper	**(Italy) Andrea Caldarelli** **(South Africa) Jordan Pepper**	No Entries	(Belgium) Jan Heylen (United States) Charlie Luck	(United States) Conrad Grunewald (United States) Jean-Claude Saada	
1	R2	(United States) Sonoma	(United States) #6 SADA Systems/USRT	**(United States) #1 K-PAX Racing**	No Entries	(United States) #45 Wright Motorsports	(Italy) #61 AF Corse	
1	R2	(United States) Sonoma	(Italy) Loris Spinelli	**(Italy) Andrea Caldarelli** **(South Africa) Jordan Pepper**	No Entries	(Belgium) Jan Heylen (United States) Charlie Luck	(United States) Conrad Grunewald (United States) Jean-Claude Saada	
2	R1	(United States) NOLA	(United States) #1 K-PAX Racing	**(United States) #1 K-PAX Racing**	No Entries	(United States) #04 CrowdStrike Racing by Riley Motorsports	(United States) #23 Triarsi Competizione	
2	R1	(United States) NOLA	(Italy) Michele Beretta	**(Italy) Michele Beretta** **(Italy) Andrea Caldarelli**	No Entries	(United States) Colin Braun (United States) George Kurtz	(United States) Charlie Scardina (United States) Onofrio Triarsi	
2	R2	(United States) NOLA	(United States) #6 SADA Systems/USRT	**(United States) #1 K-PAX Racing**	No Entries	(United States) #93 Racers Edge Motorsports	(United States) #23 Triarsi Competizione	
2	R2	(United States) NOLA	(Italy) Loris Spinelli	**(Italy) Michele Beretta** **(Italy) Andrea Caldarelli**	No Entries	(Germany) Mario Farnbacher (United States) Ashton Harrison	(United States) Charlie Scardina (United States) Onofrio Triarsi	
3	R1	(United States) Virginia	(United States) #1 K-PAX Racing	**(United States) #1 K-PAX Racing**	No Entries	(United States) #13 Triarsi Competizione	(United States) #23 Triarsi Competizione	
3	R1	(United States) Virginia	(Italy) Michele Beretta	**(Italy) Michele Beretta** **(Italy) Andrea Caldarelli**	No Entries	(United Kingdom) Ryan Dalziel (United States) Justin Wetherill	(United States) Charlie Scardina (United States) Onofrio Triarsi	
3	R2	(United States) Virginia	(United States) #93 Racers Edge Motorsports	**(United States) #1 K-PAX Racing**	No Entries	(United States) #04 CrowdStrike Racing by Riley Motorsports	(United States) #23 Triarsi Competizione	
3	R2	(United States) Virginia	(Germany) Mario Farnbacher	**(Italy) Michele Beretta** **(Italy) Andrea Caldarelli**	No Entries	(United States) Colin Braun (United States) George Kurtz	(United States) Charlie Scardina (United States) Onofrio Triarsi	
4	R1	(United States) Watkins Glen	(United States) #1 K-PAX Racing	(United States) #96 Turner Motorsport	No Entries	**(United States) #45 Wright Motorsports**	(United States) #23 Triarsi Competizione	
4	R1	(United States) Watkins Glen	(Italy) Michele Beretta	(United States) Michael Dinan (United States) Robby Foley	No Entries	**(Belgium) Jan Heylen** **(United States) Charlie Luck**	(United States) Charlie Scardina (United States) Onofrio Triarsi	
4	R2	(United States) Watkins Glen	(United States) #6 SADA Systems/USRT	(United States) #33 Winward Racing	No Entries	**(United States) #04 CrowdStrike Racing by Riley Motorsports**	(United States) #23 Triarsi Competizione	
4	R2	(United States) Watkins Glen	(Italy) Loris Spinelli	(United Kingdom) Philip Ellis (United States) Russell Ward	No Entries	**(United States) Colin Braun** **(United States) George Kurtz**	(United States) Charlie Scardina (United States) Onofrio Triarsi	
5	R1	(United States) Road America	(United States) #33 Winward Racing	**(United States) #33 Winward Racing**	No Entries	(United States) #93 Racers Edge Motorsports	(United States) #23 Triarsi Competizione	
5	R1	(United States) Road America	(United States) Russell Ward	**(United Kingdom) Philip Ellis** **(United States) Russell Ward**	No Entries	(Germany) Mario Farnbacher (United States) Ashton Harrison	(United States) Charlie Scardina (United States) Onofrio Triarsi	
5	R2	(United States) Road America	(United States) #6 SADA Systems/USRT	**(United States) #33 Winward Racing**	No Entries	(United States) #93 Racers Edge Motorsports	(United States) #23 Triarsi Competizione	
5	R2	(United States) Road America	(Italy) Loris Spinelli	**(United Kingdom) Philip Ellis** **(United States) Russell Ward**	No Entries	(Germany) Mario Farnbacher (United States) Ashton Harrison	(United States) Charlie Scardina (United States) Onofrio Triarsi	
6	R1	(United States) Sebring	(United States) #1 K-PAX Racing	**(United States) #1 K-PAX Racing**	No Entries	(United States) #93 Racers Edge Motorsports	(United States) #23 Triarsi Competizione	
6	R1	(United States) Sebring	(Italy) Michele Beretta	**(Italy) Michele Beretta** **(Italy) Andrea Caldarelli**	No Entries	(Germany) Mario Farnbacher (United States) Ashton Harrison	(United States) Charlie Scardina (United States) Onofrio Triarsi	
6	R2	(United States) Sebring	(United States) #34 Conquest Racing	**(United States) #1 K-PAX Racing**	No Entries	(United States) #45 Wright Motorsports	(United States) #23 Triarsi Competizione	
6	R2	(United States) Sebring	(Italy) Alessandro Balzan	**(Italy) Michele Beretta** **(Italy) Andrea Caldarelli**	No Entries	(Belgium) Jan Heylen (United States) Charlie Luck	(United States) Charlie Scardina (United States) Onofrio Triarsi	
7		(United States) Indianapolis	(United States) #33 Winward Racing	**(Hong Kong) #77 Theodore Racing with Craft-Bamboo**	(Canada) #38 ST Racing	(United States) #94 Bimmerworld Racing	(United States) #88 Zelus Motorsports	
7		(United States) Indianapolis	(France) Jules Gounon	**(Spain) Daniel Juncadella** **(Switzerland) Raffaele Marciello** **(Canada) Daniel Morad**	(United States) Harry Gottsacker (Canada) Samantha Tan (Canada) Nick Wittmer	(United States) Bill Auberlen (United States) Richard Heistand (United States) Chandler Hull	(United States) Jason Daskalos (United States) Jason Harward (United States) Seth Lucas	

== Championship standings ==
Scoring system

Championship points are awarded for the first ten positions in each race. Entries are required to complete 75% of the winning car's race distance in order to be classified and earn points. Individual drivers are required to participate for a minimum of 40 minutes in order to earn championship points in any race. Race-by-race entries which only participated in either of the final two races of the season are not eligible for points.

Standard Points

Position	**1st**	**2nd**	**3rd**	**4th**	**5th**	**6th**	**7th**	**8th**	**9th**	**10th**
Points	25	18	15	12	10	8	6	4	2	1

Indianapolis Points

Position	**1st**	**2nd**	**3rd**	**4th**	**5th**	**6th**	**7th**	**8th**	**9th**	**10th**
Points	50	36	30	24	20	16	12	8	4	2

=== Drivers' championship ===
Pos.	Driver	Team	SON		NOL		VIR		WGL		ELK		SEB		IND	Points
Pos.	Driver	Team	RD1	RD2	RD1	RD2	RD1	RD2	RD1	RD2	RD1	RD2	RD1	RD2	RDU	Points
Pro class
1	(Italy) Andrea Caldarelli	(United States) K-PAX Racing	**1**	1	**1**	1	**1**	1	**14**	7	3	2	**1**	**1**	Ret	263
2	(South Africa) Jordan Pepper	(United States) K-PAX Racing	**1**	1	2	4	7	5	15	15†	2	14†	3	3	7	229
3	(Italy) Michele Beretta	(United States) K-PAX Racing			**1**	1	**1**	1	**14**	7	3	2	**1**	**1**	Ret	213
4	(Canada) Misha Goikhberg	(United States) K-PAX Racing	3	3	2	4	7	5	15	15†	2	14†	3	3	7	209
5	(United States) Michael Dinan (United States) Robby Foley	(United States) Turner Motorsport	4	4	15	Ret	2	3	3	8	Ret	DNS	2	WD	1	180
6	(United Kingdom) Philip Ellis (United States) Russell Ward	(United States) Winward Racing	5	2					9	2	**1**	1			**2**	154
7	(United States) Steven Aghakhani (Italy) Loris Spinelli	(United States) SADA Systems/USRT	2	**17**	5	**3**	8	**7**	8	**14**†	Ret	**DNS**			Ret	115
8	(Italy) Giacomo Altoè	(United States) K-PAX Racing	3	3												30
9	(Germany) Dirk Müller (United States) Bryan Sellers	(United States) USALCO/ DXDT Racing													Ret	0
Pro/Am class
1	(Germany) Mario Farnbacher (United States) Ashton Harrison	(United States) Racers Edge Motorsports	11	**6**	**4**	2	Ret	**10**	13	3	4	**3**	5	13	5	212
2	(Belgium) Jan Heylen (United States) Charlie Luck	(United States) Wright Motorsports	6	5	16	9	4	8	1	9	6	6	**7**	4	12	207
3	(United States) Bill Auberlen (United States) Chandler Hull	(United States) Bimmerworld Racing	**8**	14	6	5	**12**	4	11	4	**5**	5	Ret	5	3	195
4	(United States) Colin Braun (United States) George Kurtz	(United States) CrowdStrike Racing by Riley Motorsports	7	7	3	6	13	2	**2**	1	Ret	12	6	7	16†	185
5	(United Kingdom) Ryan Dalziel (United States) Justin Wetherill	(United States) Triarsi Competizione	Ret	12	9	10	3	11	7	**5**	DNS	DNS	13	**6**	10	110
6	(United States) Michael Cooper (United States) Erin Vogel	(United States) RealTime Racing	12	9	8	11	9	Ret	4	10	9	7	Ret	DNS	15†	93
7	(United States) Bryan Sellers (United States) Scott Smithson	(United States) Qelo Capital/ DXDT Racing	13	20	13	7	16	9	6	13	7	4	9	8		84
8	(United States) David Askew (Germany) Dirk Müller	(United States) USALCO/ DXDT Racing	Ret	10	Ret	15	5	6	5	11	8	11	11	11		84
9	(United States) Jeff Burton (United States) Corey Lewis	(United States) Zelus Motorsports	9	19	10	13	15	Ret	Ret	DNS						78
9	(United States) Jeff Burton (United States) Corey Lewis	(United States) TR3 Racing									Ret	9	8	10	8	78
10	(Lebanon) Ziad Ghandour	(United States) TR3 Racing	16	8	7	**8**	6	12								54
11	(Italy) Giacomo Altoè	(United States) TR3 Racing			7	**8**	6	12								40
12	(United States) Frank Gannett (United States) Drew Staveley	(United States) Ian Lacy Racing with G3 Racing	18	13	11	16	10	14	DNS	DNS	10	10	12	12		38
13	(United States) James Sofronas (United States) Kyle Washington	(United States) GMG Racing													9	24
14	(Canada) Samantha Tan (Canada) Nick Wittmer	(Canada) ST Racing	10	11			Ret	DNS								16
15	(Italy) Michele Beretta	(United States) TR3 Racing	16	8												14
16	(United States) Jason Harward (United States) Madison Snow	(United States) Zelus Motorsports	17	16	Ret	12	14	Ret	Ret	12						9
17	(United States) P. J. Hyett (United States) Gunnar Jeannette	(United States) Team Hardpoint							12	DNS						4
18	(United States) Charlie Scardina (United States) Onofrio Triarsi	(United States) Triarsi Competizione													**Ret**	0
Am class
1	(United States) Charlie Scardina (United States) Onofrio Triarsi	(United States) Triarsi Competizione	**15**	18	**12**	**14**	**11**	**13**	**10**	**6**	**11**	**8**	**10**	**9**		286
2	(United States) Conrad Grunewald (United States) Jean-Claude Saada	(Italy) AF Corse	14	**15**	14	17	Ret	DNS								86
3	(United States) Jason Harward	(United States) Zelus Motorsports													13	50
4	(United States) David Askew (United States) Scott Smithson	(United States) Qelo Capital/ DXDT Racing													**18**	36
5	(United States) James Sofronas (United States) Kyle Washington	(United States) GMG Racing									12	13				36
Pos.	Driver	Team	SON		NOL		VIR		WGL		ELK		SEB		IND	Points

Key
Colour	Result
Gold	Race winner
Silver	2nd place
Bronze	3rd place
Green	Points finish
Blue	Non-points finish
Blue	Non-classified finish (NC)
Purple	Did not finish (Ret)
Black	Disqualified (DSQ)
Black	Excluded (EX)
White	Did not start (DNS)
White	Race cancelled (C)
White	Withdrew (WD)
Blank	Did not participate

**Bold** – Pole
Italics – Fastest Lap

Notes

- † – Drivers did not finish the race but were classified, as they completed more than 75% of the race distance.

=== Teams' championship ===
Pos.	Team	Manufacturer	SON		NOL		VIR		WGL		ELK		SEB		IND	Points
Pos.	Team	Manufacturer	RD1	RD2	RD1	RD2	RD1	RD2	RD1	RD2	RD1	RD2	RD1	RD2	RDU	Points
Pro class
1	(United States) K-PAX Racing	(Italy) Lamborghini	**1**	1	**1**	1	**1**	1	**7**	14	2	2	**1**	**1**	11	296
2	(United States) Turner Motorsport	(Germany) BMW	4	4	15	Ret	2	3	3	8	Ret	DNS	2	WD	3	189
3	(United States) Winward Racing	(Germany) Mercedes-AMG	5	2					9	2	**1**	1			**4**	156
4	(United States) SADA Systems/ USRT	(Germany) Mercedes-AMG	2	**17**	5	**3**	8	**7**	8	**14**	Ret	**DNS**			Ret	126
5	(United States) USALCO/ DXDT Racing	(Germany) Mercedes-AMG													Ret	
Pro/Am class
1	(United States) Racers Edge Motorsports	(Japan) Acura	11	**6**	**4**	2	Ret	**10**	13	3	4	**3**	5	13	9	216
2	(United States) Wright Motorsports	(Germany) Porsche	6	5	16	9	4	8	1	9	6	6	**7**	4	16	207
3	(United States) Bimmerworld Racing	(Germany) BMW	**8**	14	6	5	**12**	4	11	4	**5**	5	Ret	5	6	197
4	(United States) CrowdStrike Racing by Riley Motorsports	(Germany) Mercedes-AMG	7	7	3	6	13	2	**2**	1	Ret	12	6	7	20	187
5	(United States) Qelo Capital/ DXDT Racing (United States) USALCO/ DXDT Racing	(Germany) Mercedes-AMG	13	10	13	7	5	6	5	11	7	4	9	8		124
6	(United States) Triarsi Competizione	(Italy) Ferrari	Ret	12	9	10	3	11	7	**5**	DNS	DNS	13	**6**	**14**	114
7	(United States) TR3 Racing	(Italy) Lamborghini	16	8	7	**8**	6	12			Ret	9	8	10	12	112
8	(United States) RealTime Racing	(Japan) Acura	12	9	8	11	9	Ret	4	10	9	7	Ret	DNS	19	95
9	(United States) Ian Lacy Racing with G3 Racing	(United Kingdom) Aston Martin	18	13	11	16	10	14	DNS	DNS	10	10	12	12		48
10	(United States) Zelus Motorsports	(Italy) Lamborghini	9	16	10	12	14	Ret	Ret	12						26
11	(United States) GMG Racing	(Germany) Porsche													13	24
12	(Canada) ST Racing	(Germany) BMW	10	11			Ret	DNS								16
13	(United States) Team Hardpoint	(Germany) Porsche								12	DNS					6
Am class
1	(United States) Triarsi Competizione	(Italy) Ferrari	**15**	18	**12**	**14**	**11**	**13**	**10**	**6**	**11**	**8**	**10**	**9**		86
2	(Italy) AF Corse	(Italy) Ferrari	14	**15**	14	17	Ret	DNS								86
3	(United States) Zelus Motorsports	(Italy) Lamborghini													17	50
4	(United States) GMG Racing	(Germany) Porsche									12	13				36
=	(United States) Qelo Capital/ DXDT Racing	(Germany) Mercedes-AMG													**18**	36
Pos.	Driver	Team	SON		NOL		VIR		WGL		ELK		SEB		IND	Points

== See also ==
- 2022 British GT Championship
- 2022 GT World Challenge Europe
- 2022 GT World Challenge Europe Endurance Cup
- 2022 GT World Challenge Europe Sprint Cup
- 2022 GT World Challenge Asia
- 2022 GT World Challenge Australia
- 2022 Intercontinental GT Challenge
