= Seth Lucas =

American racing driver (born 2006)

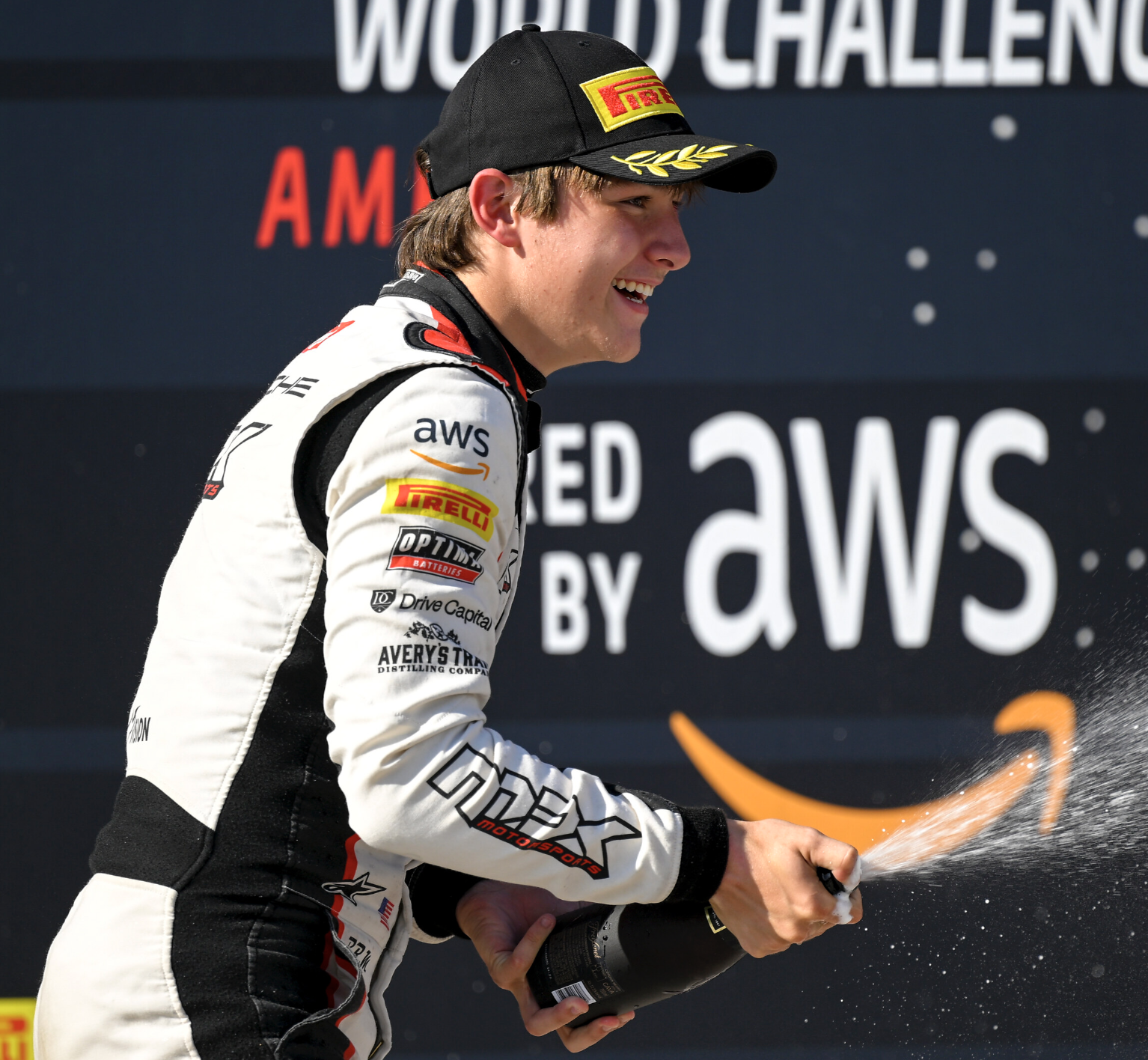
- Nationality: (United States) American
- Born: 12 January 2006 (age 20) Powell, Ohio, United States

IMSA career
- Debut season: 2023
- Current team: High Class Racing MDK Motorsports
- Categorisation: FIA Silver
- Car number: 20

Seth Lucas (born 12 January 2006) is an American racing driver. He last competed in the IMSA SportsCar Championship (GTD) for Korthoff Competition Motors. He has also competed in the Asian Le Mans Series (LMP3) for MDK Motorsports and High Class Racing. In 2023, Lucas competed in the SRO GT World Challenge America series for MDK Motorsports in a Porsche 992 GT3 R. In 2022, Lucas Competed in SRO GT World Challenge America series for Hattori Motorsports.

== Racing record ==
=== Racing career summary ===
Season	Series	Team	Races	Wins	Poles	F/Laps	Podiums	Points	Position
2021	Trans-Am Series - SGT	Ave Motorsports	1	0	0	0	1	26	12th
2022	GT America Series - GT4	TGR Hattori Motorsports	8	2	1	1	5	115	6th
2022	GT4 America Series - Pro-Am	TGR Hattori Motorsports	6	0	0	0	0	30	12th
2022	GT World Challenge America - Am	Zelus Motorsports	1	1	0	0	1	0	NC†
2022	Trans-Am Series	Ave Motorsports	1	1	1	1	1	18	7th
2022-23	Middle East Trophy - GT3	Herberth Motorsport	1	0	0	0	0	0	NC†
2023	GT World Challenge America - Pro	MDK Motorsports	13	0	0	0	8	190	**3rd**
2023	IMSA SportsCar Championship - LMP3	Ave Motorsports	3	0	0	0	0	808	19th
2023	Michelin Pilot Challenge - GS	TGR Hattori Motorsports	1	0	0	0	0	140	60th
2023	24H GT Series - GT3	Herberth Motorsport	1	0	0	0	0	0	NC†
2023-24	Asian Le Mans Series - LMP3	High Class Racing	5	0	0	0	2	56	5th
2024	IMSA SportsCar Championship - LMP2	MDK by High Class Racing	7	0	0	0	0	1725	11th
2024	IMSA VP Racing SportsCar Challenge - LMP3	Ave Motorsports	2	0	0	0	1	560	16th
2024-25	Asian Le Mans Series - LMP3	High Class Racing	0	0	0	0	0	0	WD
2025	IMSA SportsCar Championship - GTD	Korthoff Competition Motors	4	0	0	0	0	978	31st
2025	Le Mans Cup - LMP3	High Class Racing							
2026	IMSA SportsCar Championship - LMP2	Intersport Racing	3	0	0	0	0	710	25th

^{†} As Lucas was a guest driver, he was ineligible to score points.^{*} Season still in progress.

=== GT World Challenge America results ===
(key) (Races in bold indicate pole position) (Races in italics indicate fastest lap)

Year	Team	Car	Class	1	2	3	4	5	6	7	8	9	10	11	12	13	Pos	Points
2022	Zelus Motorsports	Lamborghini Huracán GT3 Evo	Am	SON; 1	SON; 2	NOL; 1	NOL; 2	VIR; 1	VIR; 2	WGL; 1	WGL; 2	ROA; 1	ROA; 2	SEB; 1	SEB; 2	IMS; 1	NC†	0
2023	MDK Motorsports	Porsche 911 GT3 R (992)	Pro	SON; 1; 7	SON; 2; 8	NOL; 1; 6	NOL; 2; 7	COA; 1; 11	COA; 2; 5	VIR; 1; 4	VIR; 2; 14	ELK; 1; 8	ELK; 2; 4	SEB; 1; 3	SEB; 2; 7	IMS; 8	3rd	190

^{†} As Lucas was a guest driver, he was ineligible to score points.

=== Complete IMSA SportsCar Championship results ===
(key) (Races in bold indicate pole position)

Year	Team	Class	Make	Engine	1	2	3	4	5	6	7	8	9	10	Rank	Points
2023	Ave Motorsports	LMP3	Ligier JS P320	Nissan VK56DE 5.6L V8	DAY	SEB; 5	WGL; 6	MOS	ELK; 6	IMS	PET				19th	808
2024	High Class Racing	LMP2	Oreca 07	Gibson GK428 4.2 L V8	DAY; 10	SEB; 8	WGL; 4	MOS; 12	ELK; 9	IMS; 10	ATL; 8				11th	1725
2025	Korthoff Competition Motors	GTD	Mercedes-AMG GT3 Evo	Mercedes-AMG M159 6.2 L V8	DAY; 9	SEB; 18	LBH; 6	**LGA**; 4	WGL	MOS	ELK	VIR	IMS	PET	31st	978
2026	Intersport Racing	LMP2	Oreca 07	Gibson GK428 4.2 L V8	DAY; 7	SEB; 10	WGL; 11	MOS	ELK	IMS	PET				25th	710

=== Complete Asian Le Mans Series Results ===
(key) (Races in bold indicate pole position) (Races in italics indicate fastest lap)

Year	Team	Class	Car	Engine	1	2	3	4	5	Pos.	Points
2023–24	High Class Racing	LMP3	Ligier JS P320	Nissan VK56DE 5.6 L V8	**SEP**; **1**; 4	**SEP**; **2** Ret	DUB; 3	ABU; 1; 3	ABU; 2; 4	5th	56
