= 2016 Ferrari Challenge North America =

The 2016 Ferrari Challenge North America was the 23rd season of Ferrari Challenge North America.

== Entry list ==
All teams and drivers used the Ferrari 458 Challenge Evo fitted with Pirelli tyres.

Team	No.	Drivers	Class	Rounds
(United States) Ferrari of Houston	2	(Mexico) Ricardo Pérez de Lara	TP	1, 3
(United States) Ferrari of Houston	47	(United States) Darren Crystal	TPAM	3
(United States) Ferrari of Houston	73	(United States) Bryn Owen	TPAM	1
(United States) Lake Forest Sportscars	5	(United States) Nick Mancuso	TP	2–3
(United States) Lake Forest Sportscars	6	(United States) Rick Mancuso	CS	1–4
(United States) Lake Forest Sportscars	7	(United States) Cort Wagner	TP	2
(United States) Ferrari of Beverly Hills	7	(Mexico) Martín Fuentes	TP	1
(United States) Ferrari of Beverly Hills	17	(United States) Alistair Garnett	TPAM	2–4
(United States) Ferrari of Beverly Hills	101	(United States) Darren Enenstein	CS	1–4
(United States) Ferrari of Beverly Hills	106	(United States) Karl Williams	CS	3–4
(United States) Ferrari of Beverly Hills	153	(United States) Neil Langberg	CS	1–4
(United States) Ferrari of San Francisco	9	(Lebanon) Zaid Ghandour	TPAM	2
(United States) Ferrari of San Francisco	113	(United States) Geoff Palermo	CS	1
(United States) Ferrari of San Francisco	125	(United States) Matt Keegan	CS	1
(United States) Ferrari of Fort Lauderdale	10	(Sweden) Henrik Hedman	TP	1
(United States) Ferrari of Fort Lauderdale	44	(Venezuela) Carlos Kauffmann	TP	1–4
(United States) Ferrari of Fort Lauderdale	85	(United States) Steve Johnson	TPAM	1–4
(United States) Ferrari of Fort Lauderdale	112	(United States) Dan O'Neal	CS	1, 4
(United States) Ferrari of Central Florida	11	(United States) Lance Willsey	TPAM	1
(United States) Ferrari of Central Florida	11	(United States) Onofrio Triarsi	TPAM	3
(United States) Ferrari of Central Florida	12	(United States) Charles Quinton	TPAM	1–4
(United States) Ferrari of Central Florida	121	(Mexico) Luis Perusquia	CS	1–4
(Canada) Ferrari of Ontario	13	(Canada) Marc Muzzo	TPAM	1–4
(Canada) Ferrari of Ontario	31	(Canada) Damon Ockey	TP	3
(Canada) Ferrari of Ontario	120	(Canada) Rick Lovat	CS	1, 3–4
(Canada) Ferrari of Ontario	179	(Netherlands) Fons Scheltema	CS	4
(Canada) Ferrari of Ontario	199	(Canada) Barry Zekelman	CS	1–4
(United States) Ferrari of Newport Beach	14	(United States) Brent Lawrence	TPAM	1–4
(United States) Ferrari of Newport Beach	151	(United States) Rob Hodes	CS	1–4
(United States) Boardwalk Ferrari	18	(United States) James Weiland	TPAM	1–4
(United States) Boardwalk Ferrari	161	(United States) Jean-Claude Saada	CS	1–4
(United States) Ferrari of Palm Beach	4	(United States) Charles Quinton	TPAM	2–4
(United States) Ferrari of Palm Beach	21	(United States) Danny Baker	TPAM	2–4
(United States) Ferrari of Long Island	24	(United States) Caesar Bacarella	TPAM	1–4
(United States) Ferrari of Long Island	111	(United States) Joe Vitagliano	CS	1–2, 4
(United States) Ferrari of Long Island	119	(United States) Chris Cagnazzi	CS	1–4
(United States) The Collection	33	(United States) Arthur Romanelli	TPAM	1–4
(United States) The Collection	38	(United States) Gregory Romanelli	TP	1–4
(United States) The Collection	123	(United States) Alexander Menzel	CS	1–4
(Canada) Ferrari of Quebec	71	(Canada) Patrice Brisebois	TPAM	1–4
(Canada) Ferrari of Quebec	77	(Canada) Emmanuel Anassis	TP	1–4
(Canada) Ferrari of Quebec	117	(Canada) Martin LaBrecque	CS	1, 4
(United States) Continental Autosport	3	(United States) Joel Weinberger	TPAM	3–4
(United States) Continental Autosport	76	(United States) Joel Weinberger	TPAM	3–4
(United States) Miller Motor Cars	105	(United States) Rodney Randall	CS	1–4
(United States) Miller Motor Cars	116	(United States) Al Delattre	CS	1
(United States) Miller Motor Cars	177	(United States) Joe Courtney	CS	1–4
(Canada) Ferrari of Vancouver	99	(Canada) Wei Lu	TP	1–4
(Canada) Ferrari of Vancouver	100	(United States) Rusty Wallace	TP	1–4
(United States) Ferrari of Atlanta	134	(United States) Michael Watt	CS	1–4
(United States) Ferrari of Atlanta	176	(United States) Lance Cawley	CS	2–4
(United States) Ferrari of San Diego	178	(United States) Al Hegyi	CS	1–4
(United States) Ferrari of San Diego	179	(Venezuela) Enzo Potolicchio	TP	1–4
(United States) Ron Tonkin Gran Turismo	187	(United States) Rich Baek	CS	1–3
(United States) Ron Tonkin Gran Turismo	200	(United States) Cooper MacNeil	TP	1–4
(Italy) Misano Racing Team	222	(Italy) Daniel Mancinelli	TP	1–4
(Italy) Misano Racing Team	250	(United States) Charles Quinton	TPAM	3–4
(United States) Target Racing	251	(United States) Brent Lawrence	TPAM	3–4
(United States) Target Racing	255	(United States) Danny Baker	TPAM	3–4
(Brazil) GP Project Team	256	(United States) Caesar Bacarella	TPAM	3–4
(Brazil) GP Project Team	300	(Brazil) Francisco Longo	CS	3–4
(Netherlands) Team RB Racing	301	(United States) Dave Musial	TPAM	3–4
(Netherlands) Team RB Racing	311	(United States) Tim Demore	TPAM	3–4
(France) Belt Racing	500	(United States) Brian Kaminskey	CS	3–4
(France) Belt Racing	555	(United Kingdom) Tom Sharp	CS	3–4

Icon	Class
TP	Trofeo Pirelli
TPAM	Trofeo Pirelli Amateur
CS	Coppa Shell

== Race calendar and results ==
Round		Circuit	Date	Pole position	Fastest lap	Winning driver	Winning team	TPAM Winner	Coppa Shell Winner
1	R1	(United States) Daytona International Speedway	29 January	(Canada) Emmanuel Anassis	(United States) Gregory Romanelli	(Canada) Emmanuel Anassis	(Canada) Ferrari of Quebec	(United States) Steve Johnson	(United States) Joe Courtney
1	R2	(United States) Daytona International Speedway	30 January	(Mexico) Ricardo Pérez de Lara	(Mexico) Ricardo Pérez de Lara	(Mexico) Ricardo Pérez de Lara	(United States) Ferrari of Houston	(United States) Steve Johnson	(Canada) Rick Lovat
2	R3	(United States) Sonoma Raceway	9 April	(Canada) Emmanuel Anassis	(Canada) Emmanuel Anassis	(Canada) Emmanuel Anassis	(Canada) Ferrari of Quebec	(United States) Steve Johnson	(United States) Joe Courtney
2	R4	(United States) Sonoma Raceway	10 April	(Canada) Emmanuel Anassis	(Venezuela) Carlos Kauffmann	(United States) Gregory Romanelli	(United States) The Collection	(Canada) Patrice Brisebois	(United States) Joe Courtney
3	R5	(United States) Circuit of the Americas	14 May	(United States) Gregory Romanelli	(Mexico) Ricardo Pérez de Lara	(Mexico) Ricardo Pérez de Lara	(United States) Ferrari of Houston	(United States) James Weiland	(United States) Matt Keegan
3	R6	(United States) Circuit of the Americas	15 May	(United States) Gregory Romanelli	(United States) Gregory Romanelli	(Mexico) Ricardo Pérez de Lara	(United States) Ferrari of Houston	(United States) James Weiland	(United States) Joe Courtney
4	R7	(Canada) Circuit Gilles Villeneuve	11 June	(United States) Gregory Romanelli	(Venezuela) Carlos Kauffmann	(United States) Gregory Romanelli	(United States) The Collection	(United States) James Weiland	(Canada) Rick Lovat
4	R8	(Canada) Circuit Gilles Villeneuve	12 June	(United States) Gregory Romanelli	(Venezuela) Carlos Kauffmann	(Canada) Emmanuel Anassis	(Canada) Ferrari of Quebec	(United States) James Weiland	(United States) Joe Courtney
5	R9	(United States) Lime Rock Park	23 September	(Venezuela) Carlos Kauffmann	(Venezuela) Carlos Kauffmann	(Venezuela) Carlos Kauffmann	(United States) Ferrari of Fort Lauderdale	(United States) Arthur Romanelli	(United States) Matt Keegan
5	R10	(United States) Lime Rock Park	24 September	(Canada) Wei Lu	(Canada) Wei Lu	(Venezuela) Carlos Kauffmann	(United States) Ferrari of Fort Lauderdale	(Canada) Marc Muzzo	(United States) Joe Courtney
6	R11	(United States) Homestead-Miami Speedway	5 November	(Italy) Daniel Mancinelli	(Italy) Daniel Mancinelli	(Italy) Daniel Mancinelli	(Italy) Misano Racing Team	(United States) Steve Johnson	(United States) Matt Keegan
6	R12	(United States) Homestead-Miami Speedway	6 November	(Italy) Daniel Mancinelli	(Italy) Daniel Mancinelli	(Italy) Daniel Mancinelli	(Italy) Misano Racing Team	(Canada) Marc Muzzo	(United States) Matt Keegan
7	R13	(United States) Daytona International Speedway	3 December	(Venezuela) Carlos Kauffmann	(Venezuela) Carlos Kauffmann	(Venezuela) Carlos Kauffmann	(United States) Ferrari of Fort Lauderdale	(United States) James Weiland	(United States) Matt Keegan
7	R14	(United States) Daytona International Speedway	4 December	(Italy) Daniel Mancinelli	(Italy) Daniel Mancinelli	(Italy) Daniel Mancinelli	(Italy) Misano Racing Team	(United States) Arthur Romanelli	(United States) Rob Hodes

== Championship standings ==
All drivers get a bonus point for appearing on the entry list, then 20 points for a (class) win, 15 for second, 12 for third, 10 for fourth, 8 for fifth, 6 for sixth, 4 for seventh and 2 points for eighth. All remaining entrants get 1 point. There is a bonus point for pole and fastest lap in each race.

Points were awarded to the top ten classified finishers as follows:

Race Position	1st	2nd	3rd	4th	5th	6th	7th	8th or lower	Pole	FLap
Points	15	12	10	8	6	4	2	1	1	1

=== Trofeo Pirelli ===
Pos.	Driver	DAY (United States)		SON (United States)		AUS (United States)		MON (Canada)		LIM (United States)		HOM (United States)		DAY (United States)		Pts
Pos.	Driver	RD1	RD2	RD1	RD2	RD1	RD2	RD1	RD2	RD1	RD2	RD1	RD2	RD1	RD2	Pts
1	(Venezuela) Carlos Kauffmann	7	5	2	3	2	6	3	3	1	1	Ret	4	1	3	189
2	(Canada) Emmanuel Anassis	1	2	1	2	5	4	2	1	DNS	DNS	INF	INF			126
3	(Canada) Wei Lu	4	6	4	4	4	8	DNS	DNS	2	2	4	5	Ret	4	126
4	(United States) Gregory Romanelli	2	4	3	1	6	2	1	2			Ret	Ret	DSQ	DSQ	123
5	(Mexico) Ricardo Pérez de Lara	3	1			1	1									78
6	(Italy) Daniel Mancinelli											1	1	Ret	1	74
7	(Mexico) Martín Fuentes	5	3									3	3	Ret	Ret	65
8	(United States) Cooper MacNeil											2	2	2	2	62
9	(United States) Nick Mancuso			DNS	5	7	3			Ret	3					26
10	(Canada) Damon Ockey					3	5									21
11	(Venezuela) Enzo Potolicchio											5	6	Ret	Ret	17
12	(United States) Cort Wagner			5	6											15
13	(Sweden) Henrik Hedman	6	7													11
14	(United States) Onofrio Triarsi					8	7									7
15	(United States) Rusty Wallace													Ret	Ret	0
Pos.	Driver	DAY (United States)		SON (United States)		AUS (United States)		MON (Canada)		LIM (United States)		HOM (United States)		DAY (United States)		Pts

Colour	Result
Gold	Winner
Silver	Second place
Bronze	Third place
Green	Points classification
Blue	Non-points classification
Blue	Non-classified finish (NC)
Purple	Retired, not classified (Ret)
Red	Did not qualify (DNQ)
Red	Did not pre-qualify (DNPQ)
Black	Disqualified (DSQ)
White	Did not start (DNS)
White	Withdrew (WD)
White	Race cancelled (C)
Blank	Did not practice (DNP)
Blank	Did not arrive (DNA)
Blank	Excluded (EX)

=== Trofeo Pirelli Am ===
Pos.	Driver	DAY (United States)		SON (United States)		AUS (United States)		MON (Canada)		LIM (United States)		HOM (United States)		DAY (United States)		Pts
Pos.	Driver	RD1	RD2	RD1	RD2	RD1	RD2	RD1	RD2	RD1	RD2	RD1	RD2	RD1	RD2	Pts
1	(United States) James Weiland	10	2	6	8	1	1	1	1	4	4	2	2	1	4	202
3	(United States) Steve Johnson	1	1	1	3	6	3	4	3	3	3	1	3	2	3	201
3	(United States) Arthur Romanelli	9	3	3	2	11	12	2	6	1	2	3	4	3	1	166
4	(Canada) Marc Muzzo	7	8	4	5	9	2	3	4	2	1	4	1	5	2	163
5	(Canada) Patrice Bricebois	4	4	2	1	3	6	5	2							100
6	(United States) Joel Weinberger			Ret	Ret	8	5	6	7			Ret	5	4	5	54
7	(United States) Charles Quinton	8	6	8	11	2	4	7	5			DSQ	DSQ			53
8	(United States) Caesar Bacarella	2	5	5	7	10	11	DNS	DNS	NPQ	NPQ	Ret	DNS			51
9	(United States) Brent Lawrence	5	7	10	6	DNS	8	9	8			5	6			48
10	(United States) Danny Baker	Ret	Ret	DNS	9	4	9	8	9					Ret	6	35
11	(Lebanon) Ziad Ghandour			7	4	Ret	Ret									16
12	(United States) Lance Willsey	3	10													14
13	(United States) Darren Crystal					5	7									13
14	(United States) Bryn Owen	6	9													9
15	(United States) Alistair Garnett			9	10	7	10	10	10							0
16	(Brazil) Francisco Longo											Ret	DNS			0
17	(United States) Dave Musial									Ret	Ret					0
18	(United States) Tim Demore											Ret	Ret			0
Pos.	Driver	DAY (United States)		SON (United States)		AUS (United States)		MON (Canada)		LIM (United States)		HOM (United States)		DAY (United States)		Pts

=== Coppa Shell ===
Pos.	Driver	DAY (United States)		SON (United States)		AUS (United States)		MON (Canada)		LIM (United States)		HOM (United States)		DAY (United States)		Pts
Pos.	Driver	RD1	RD2	RD1	RD2	RD1	RD2	RD1	RD2	RD1	RD2	RD1	RD2	RD1	RD2	Pts
1	(United States) Joe Courtney	1	4	1	1	3	1	4	1	3	1	6	3	3	12	204
2	(United States) Matt Keegan	11	9	6	9	1	16	16	4	1	5	1	1	1	Ret	147
3	(United States) Chris Cagnazzi	5	3	2	2	17	4	2	2	5	4	4	5	Ret	DNS	135
4	(United States) Jean-Claude Saada	2	18	14	16	2	2	6	13	2	7	3	DNS	7	NPQ	94
5	(Canada) Rick Lovat	8	1	Ret	Ret	18	14	1	3	7	6	5	Ret	DNS	DNS	84
6	(United States) Rob Hodes	10	6	3	3	4	15	17	DNS	6	3	8	7	2	1	78
7	(United States) Karl Williams			Ret	Ret	16	3	14	7	4	2	2	2	8	13	70
8	(Canada) Barry Zekelman	18	2	4	4	6	6	5	8	DNS	DNS			Ret	INF	65
9	(United States) Rodney Randall	3	16	13	18	5	5	15	5	8	8	7	8			52
10	(United States) Rich Baek	7	7	7	5	7	7	Ret	DNQ			9	4	16	11	50
11	(United States) Jeff Naughton	19	19	12	6	8	8	DNS	DNS	11	Ret	15	Ret	17	Ret	33
12	(United States) Michael Watt	17	12	8	7	11	DNS	8	9	9	9	12	10	4	7	27
13	(United States) Dan O'Neal	4	5	Ret	14	Ret	NC	DNS	DNS							22
14	(United States) Lance Cawley	Ret	DNS	9	10	9	9	9	16	10	10	11	11	11	10	21
15	(Netherlands) Fons Scheltema			Ret	13			3	6							19
16	(United States) Geoff Palermo	9	10	5	Ret			Ret	Ret							19
17	(United States) Alexander Menzel	13	13	DNS	DNS	10	11	7	10					5	Ret	16
18	(United States) Joe Vitagliano	16	15	15	15			10	15	13	11	Ret	12	6	6	16
19	(United States) Tim Demore											Ret	Ret	19	2	15
20	(United States) Dave Musial											10	6	13	5	14
21	(United States) Al Hegyi	14	11	11	8	14	10	11	12			14	13	12	14	14
22	(Mexico) Luis Perusquia			10	12	13	13			12	Ret	13	9	15	8	13
23	(United States) Alistair Garnett													10	2	13
24	(United States) Rick Mancuso													14	4	13
25	(Brazil) Francisco Longo											Ret	DNS	Ret	3	12
26	(United States) Darren Enenstein	12	17	DNS	17	12	12	12	11							11
27	(United States) Neil Langberg	15	14	DNS	11	15	17	13	14							11
28	(United States) Al Delattre	6	8													10
29	(United States) Brian Kaminskey													9	9	6
30	(Canada) Martin LaBrecque	DNS	DNS					DNS	DNS					20	14	3
31	(United Kingdom) Tom Sharp													18	Ret	0
Pos.	Driver	DAY (United States)		SON (United States)		AUS (United States)		MON (Canada)		LIM (United States)		HOM (United States)		DAY (United States)		Pts

== Television coverage ==
The Races of the Ferrari Challenge North America are broadcast on Cable Television including: ESPN, Fox Sports, Movistar+, CBS Sports y NBC Sports.

== See also ==
- Lamborghini Super Trofeo
- Mustang Challenge
- Porsche Carrera Cup
- Audi R8 LMS Cup
- Trofeo Maserati
