= Triarsi Competizione =

American auto racing team

(United States) Triarsi Competizione
- Founder(s): Onofrio Triarsi
- Base: Orlando, Florida, United States
- Team principal(s): Onofrio Triarsi
- Current series: IMSA SportsCar Championship; Ferrari Challenge North America
- Former series: GT World Challenge America
- Current drivers: IMSA SportsCar Championship: 021. (Italy) Alessandro Balzan (United States) Jason Hart (United States) Aaron Muss; 023. (United Kingdom) James Calado (United States) Onofrio Triarsi (New Zealand) Andrew Waite
- Drivers' Championships: Ferrari Challenge North America: 2020
- Website: https://triarsicomp.com/

Triarsi Competizione is an American sports car racing team that currently competes in the GTD class of the IMSA SportsCar Championship and the Ferrari Challenge North America. The team was founded by race car driver Onofrio Triarsi.

== History ==
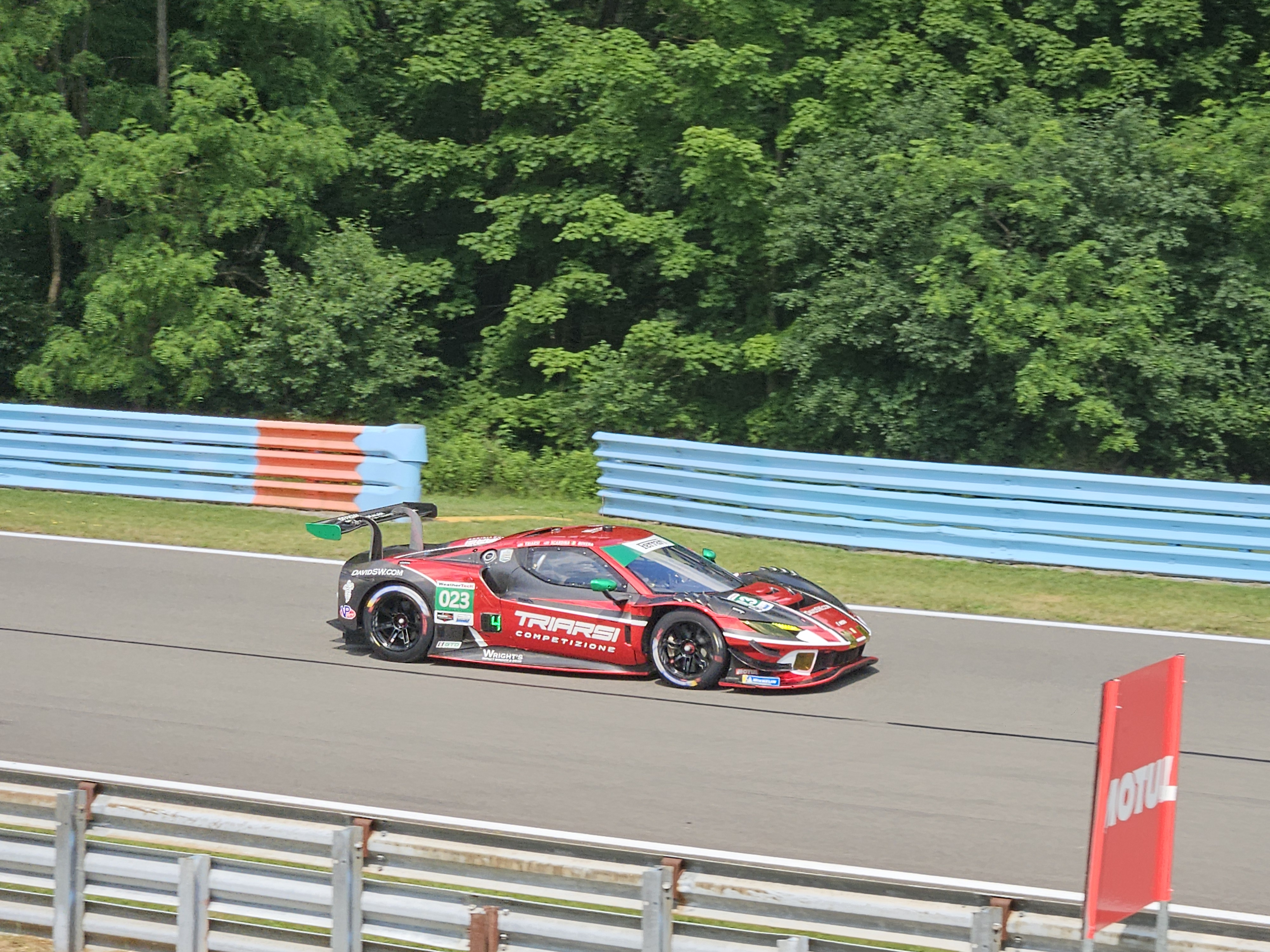
Triarsi Competizione's Ferrari 296 GT3 at the 2024 Sahlen's Six Hours of the Glen

Triarsi Competizione was founded by race car driver Onofrio Triarsi Triarsi manages several Ferrari dealerships in Central Florida and Tampa Bay where the team operates.

=== GT World Challenge America ===
==== 2021 ====
In 2021, Triarsi Competizione would compete at the sixth round of the 2021 GT World Challenge America at Sebring. The team would field the No. 23 Ferrari 488 GT3 for Charlie Scardina and Onofrio Triarsi in the Am Cup. The drivers would get pole position for race one and finish first in their class on debut. They would retire in the second race.

==== 2022 ====
The team returned for the 2022 GT World Challenge America season with two full-time entries. They fielded the No. 13 Ferrari 488 GT3 Evo 2020 in the Pro/Am Cup for Ryan Dalziel and Justin Wetherill. They also entered the No. 23 Ferrari 488 GT3 Evo 2020 in the Am Cup for Charlie Scardina and Onofrio Triarsi. The No. 13 got its first and only win in class in race one at Virginia International Raceway and ended up fifth in the Pro/Am Cup. The No. 23 had a dominant season with eleven poles, eight fastest laps, twelve podiums, and ten wins. Since the No. 23 was the only full-time entry in the Am Cup, Triarsi Competizione won the Am Cup championship by default.

==== 2023 ====
Triarsi Competizione returned for a third season in 2023 to field the No. 33 Ferrari 296 GT3 in the Pro/Am Cup for Ryan Dalziel, Justin Wetherill, and Onofrio Triarsi. The team would have a moderately successful season finishing ninth in class with one pole and two podiums.

=== IMSA SportsCar Championship ===
==== 2023 ====
Alongside a campaign in the 2023 GT World Challenge America, Triarsi Competizione would move to the top level of the IMSA ladder in 2023, the IMSA SportsCar Championship. The team would field the No. 023 Ferrari 296 GT3 in the GTD class for Alessio Rovera, Charlie Scardina, and Onofrio Triarsi. Andrea Bertolini joined the team for the season opening 24 Hours of Daytona. The No. 023 competed at only four races that season with a best finish of fourth at the Watkins Glen.

==== 2024 ====
The team returned for the 2024 season once again competing in the GTD class. The driver lineup remained unchanged from 2023, with Rovera, Scardina, and Onofrio all returning to driver the No. 023 Ferrari 296 GT3. Riccardo Agostini would join the team for the opening 2024 24 Hours of Daytona.

== Racing record ==
=== Complete IMSA SportsCar Championship results ===
(key) (Races in bold indicate pole position; races in italics indicate fastest lap)

Year	Entrant	Class	No	Chassis	Engine	Drivers	1	2	3	4	5	6	7	8	9	10	11	Pos.	Pts
2023	(United States) Triarsi Competizione	GTD	023	Ferrari 296 GT3	Ferrari F163CE 3.0 L Turbo V6	(Italy) Alessio Rovera (United States) Charlie Scardina (United States) Onofrio Triarsi (Italy) Andrea Bertolini	DAY; 10	SEB; 20	LBH	LGA	WGL; 4	MOS	LIM	ELK	VIR	IMS	ATL; 10	34th	863
2024	(United States) Triarsi Competizione	GTD	023	Ferrari 296 GT3	Ferrari F163CE 3.0 L Turbo V6	(Italy) Alessio Rovera (United States) Charlie Scardina (United States) Onofrio Triarsi (Italy) Riccardo Agostini	DAY; 4	SEB; 14	LBH	LGA		WGL; 9	MOS	ELK; 12	VIR	IMS; 21	ATL	16th	1064
2025	(United States) Triarsi Competizione	GTD	021	Ferrari 296 GT3	Ferrari F163CE 3.0 L Turbo V6	(United Kingdom) James Calado (United Kingdom) Stevan McAleer (United States) Sheena Monk (United States) Mike Skeen (Italy) Alessandro Balzan (United States) Jason Hart (United States) Aaron Muss	DAY; 22	SEB; 15	LBH; 14	LGA; 11		WGL; 12	MOS; 7	ELK; 1	VIR; 2	IMS; 8	ATL; 14	9th	2349
2025	(United States) Triarsi Competizione	GTD	023	Ferrari 296 GT3	Ferrari F163CE 3.0 L Turbo V6	(Italy) Eddie Cheever III (Italy) Alessio Rovera (United States) Charlie Scardina (United States) Onofrio Triarsi (Italy) Riccardo Agostini (United Kingdom) James Calado (New Zealand) Andrew Waite	DAY; 15	SEB; 20	LBH	LGA; 7		WGL; 4	MOS	ELK	VIR	IMS; 7	ATL; 2	14th	1479

* Season still in progress.
