= 2016 Pirelli World Challenge =

The 2016 Pirelli World Challenge was the 27th running of the Sports Car Club of America's World Challenge series. Johnny O'Connell was the defending champion in the highest class, the GT class.

== Schedule ==
The final calendar was revealed on November 3, 2015. The season comprised 11 rounds, with several rounds in support of the IndyCar Series and the WeatherTech SportsCar Championship. All tracks from the previous season were returning except for the Belle Isle, which was replaced by Lime Rock Park. On May 4, 2016, WC Vision announced that the TC class races at Mid-Ohio would be replaced by races at Lime Rock Park to give the drivers more track time.

Round	Date	Event	Circuit	Location	Classes	Supporting
1	March 3–6	Nissan Grand Prix of Texas presented by VP Racing Fuels	Circuit of the Americas	Austin, Texas	GT/GTA/GT Cup (x2); GTS (x2); TC/TCA/TCB (x2)	Headline (Note: The PWC would have been a co-headliner with the 6 Hours of the Americas, but on January 29 it was announced that the race would be cancelled.)
2	March 11–13	Cadillac Grand Prix of St. Petersburg	Streets of St. Petersburg	St. Petersburg, Florida	GT/GTA/GT Cup (x2); GTS (x2)	IndyCar Series
3	April 15–17	Replay XD Grand Prix of Long Beach presented by Cadillac	Streets of Long Beach	Long Beach, California	GT/GTA	IndyCar Series / WeatherTech SportsCar Championship
4	April 22–24	Grand Prix of Birmingham presented by Porsche	Barber Motorsports Park	Birmingham, Alabama	GT/GTA/GT Cup (x2); GTS (x2)	IndyCar Series
5	May 19–22	Canadian Tire Motorsport Park Grand Prix presented by Audi	Canadian Tire Motorsport Park	Bowmanville, Ontario	GT/GTA/GT Cup (x2); GTS (x2); TC/TCA/TCB (x2); SprintX (x2)	Co-Headliner with Clarington 200
6	May 27–28	Lime Rock Park Grand Prix presented by Bentley	Lime Rock Park	Lakeville, Connecticut	GT/GTA/GT Cup (x2); GTS (x2); TC/TCA/TCB (x2)	Headline
7	June 23–26	Road America Grand Prix presented by Cadillac	Road America	Elkhart Lake, Wisconsin	GT/GTA/GT Cup (x2); GTS (x2); TC/TCA/TCB (x2)	IndyCar Series
8	July 28–31	Mid-Ohio Grand Prix presented by Honda Racing	Mid-Ohio Sports Car Course	Lexington, Ohio	GT/GTA/GT Cup (x2); GTS (x2)	IndyCar Series
9	August 11–14	Grand Prix of Utah Motorsports Campus presented by EnergySolutions	Utah Motorsports Campus	Tooele, Utah	GT/GTA/GT Cup (x2); GTS (x2); TC/TCA/TCB (x2); SprintX (x2)	Headline
10	September 16–18	Grand Prix of Sonoma presented by Cadillac	Sonoma Raceway	Sonoma, California	GT/GTA/GT Cup (x2); GTS (x2)	IndyCar Series
11	October 7–9	MRLS Grand Prix presented by Nissan	Mazda Raceway Laguna Seca	Monterey, California	GT/GTA/GT Cup; GTS; TC/TCA/TCB (x2); SprintX (x2)	Headline

== Entry list ==
=== GT/GTA ===
Constructor	Team	Car	No.	Driver	Rounds
Acura	(United States) RealTime Racing	TLX-GT	34	(United States) Spencer Pumpelly	8–9, 11
Acura	(United States) RealTime Racing	TLX-GT	34	(Netherlands) Peter Kox	10
Acura	(United States) RealTime Racing	TLX-GT	42	(United States) Peter Cunningham	1–5, 7
Acura	(United States) RealTime Racing	TLX-GT	43	(United States) Ryan Eversley	All
Aston Martin	(Mexico) De La Torre Racing	V12 Vantage GT3	4	(Mexico) Jorge De La Torre	1–6, 11
Aston Martin	(Mexico) De La Torre Racing	V12 Vantage GT3	24	(United States) Caesar Bacarella	8
Aston Martin	(United States) TRG-AMR	V12 Vantage GT3	67	(United States) Duncan Ende	1–3
Audi	(United States) CRP Racing	R8 LMS ultra	2	(Canada) Kyle Marcelli	All
Audi	(United States) Stephen Cameron Racing	R8 LMS ultra	19	(United States) Drew Regitz	1, 4, 7, 10–11
Audi	(United States) M1 GT Racing	R8 LMS	23	(United States) Walt Bowlin	1 (R1), 4, 7 (R1)
Audi	(United States) M1 GT Racing	R8 LMS	23	(United States) Larry Pegram	1 (R2)
Audi	(United States) M1 GT Racing	R8 LMS	23	(South Africa) Dion von Moltke	7 (R2)
Audi	(United States) Global Motorsports Group	R8 LMS ultra	44	(United States) Brent Holden	3
Bentley	(Hong Kong) Bentley Team Absolute	Continental GT3	78	(South Korea) Andrew Kim	10–11
Bentley	(Hong Kong) Bentley Team Absolute	Continental GT3	87	(United States) Andrew Palmer	1–6
Bentley	(Hong Kong) Bentley Team Absolute	Continental GT3	88	(Hong Kong) Adderly Fong	1–10
Bentley	(Hong Kong) Bentley Team Absolute	Continental GT3	88	(Germany) Fabian Hamprecht	11
BMW	(United States) Mills Racing	Z4 GT3	46	(United States) Michael Mills	1
BMW	(United States) Turner Motorsport	M6 GT3	96	(United States) Bret Curtis	5
Cadillac	(United States) Cadillac Racing	ATS-V.R GT3	3	(United States) Johnny O'Connell	All
Cadillac	(United States) Cadillac Racing	ATS-V.R GT3	8	(United States) Michael Cooper	All
Dodge	(United States) Black Swan Racing	Viper GT3-R	54	(United States) Tim Pappas	1, 3
Dodge	(United States) Lone Star Racing	Viper GT3-R	80	(United States) Mike Skeen	11
Dodge	(United States) McCann Racing	Viper GT3-R	82	(United States) Michael McCann	7–8, 11
Ferrari	(United States) Scuderia Corsa	458 Italia GT3	07	(Mexico) Martín Fuentes	All
Ferrari	(United States) Scuderia Corsa	458 Italia GT3	11	(United States) Bill Sweedler	3
McLaren	(United States) K-PAX Racing	650S GT3	6	(United States) Austin Cindric	All
McLaren	(United States) K-PAX Racing	650S GT3	9	(Portugal) Álvaro Parente	All
McLaren	(United States) K-PAX Racing	650S GT3	13	(United States) Colin Thompson	All
McLaren	(United States) GAINSCO/Bob Stallings Racing	650S GT3	99	(United States) Jon Fogarty	All
Mercedes-Benz	(United States) DIME Racing	SLS AMG GT3	66	(United States) Frankie Montecalvo	1–9
Mercedes-Benz	(United States) DIME Racing	SLS AMG GT3	66	(United States) Jonathan Summerton	10–11
Nissan	(United States) AE Replay XD Nissan GT Academy	GT-R GT3	05	(United States) Bryan Heitkotter	All
Nissan	(United States) AE Replay XD Nissan GT Academy	GT-R GT3	33	(Australia) J. D. Davison	1–8, 10–11
Nissan	(United States) AE Replay XD Nissan GT Academy	GT-R GT3	33	(United Kingdom) Craig Dolby	9
Porsche	(United States) Global Motorsports Group	911 GT3 R	14	(United States) James Sofronas	1, 3, 6–7, 9–10
Porsche	(United States) Global Motorsports Group	911 GT3 R	14	(United States) Brent Holden	5, 9–11
Porsche	(United States) Wright Motorsports	911 GT3 R	16	(United States) Michael Schein	1, 4–11
Porsche	(United States) Wright Motorsports	911 GT3 R	58	(United States) Patrick Long	5–11
Porsche	(United States) EFFORT Racing	911 GT3 R	31	(United States) Patrick Long	1–4
Porsche	(United States) EFFORT Racing	911 GT3 R	41	(United States) Michael Lewis	1–4
Porsche	(United States) Flying Lizard Motorsports	911 GT3 R	45	(United States) Andy Wilzoch	7, 10
Porsche	(United States) Flying Lizard Motorsports	911 GT3 R	451	(United States) Andy Wilzoch	11
Porsche	(United States) Black Swan Racing	911 GT3 R	54	(United States) Tim Pappas	10–11
Porsche	(United States) Calvert Dynamics (Note: Cars No. 76 and 77 entered as Calvert Dynamics and car No. 98 entered as Calvert Dynamics/Curb-Agajanian.) (United States) Calvert Dynamics/Curb-Agajanian	911 GT3 R	76	(United States) Andrew Davis	1–7
Porsche	(United States) Calvert Dynamics (United States) Calvert Dynamics/Curb-Agajanian	911 GT3 R	77	(United States) Preston Calvert	8–9
Porsche	(United States) Calvert Dynamics (United States) Calvert Dynamics/Curb-Agajanian	911 GT3 R	98	(United States) Michael Lewis	7–11
Porsche	(United States) Alex Job Racing	911 GT3 R	79	(United States) Cooper MacNeil	10–11
Porsche	(United States) Alex Job Racing	911 GT3 R	97	(United States) Gunnar Jeannette	10–11
Porsche	(United States) Autometrics Motorsports	997 GT3 R	90	(United States) Joseph Toussaint	1, 4, 8

Colour	Class
	GT
	GTA

=== GT Cup ===
Every driver participated in a Porsche 911 GT3 Cup.

Team	No.	Driver	Rounds
(United States) Motorsports Promotions	00	(United States) Corey Fergus	All
(United States) Global Motorsports Group	08	(United States) Alex Welch	1, 7, 9–11
(United States) Global Motorsports Group	17	(United States) Alec Udell	1–2, 4–10
(United States) Global Motorsports Group	17	(United States) Chris Thompson	11
(Canada) Pfaff Motorsports	09	(Canada) Chris Green	5
(United States) WPD/Moorespeed	18	(United States) Will Hardeman	1
(United States) TruSpeed Autosport	20	(United States) Sloan Urry	All
(United States) Flying Lizard Motorsports	35	(United States) Mike Hedlund	10
(United States) Wright Motorsports	56	(United States) McKay Snow	9
(United States) Wright Motorsports	91	(United States) Anthony Imperato	1
(United States) Calvert Dynamics	77	(United States) Preston Calvert	1–2, 4–7, 10

=== GTS ===
Constructor	Team	Car	No.	Driver	Rounds
Aston Martin	(United States) TRG-AMR	Vantage GT4	04	(United States) George Kurtz	7, 10–11
Aston Martin	(United States) TRG-AMR	Vantage GT4	07	(Canada) Max Riddle	1, 5, 7, 9, 11
Aston Martin	(United States) TRG-AMR	Vantage GT4	09	(United States) Derek DeBoer	1–2, 4, 7, 10 (Note: Derek DeBoer and Jason Alexandridis entered in the same car at Rounds 1, 2, 4 and 10. DeBoer participated in Race 1 at Rounds 1 and 4 and in Race 2 at Rounds 2 and 10, while Alexandridis participated in Race 2 at Rounds 1 and 4 and in Race 1 at Rounds 2 and 10.)
Aston Martin	(United States) TRG-AMR	Vantage GT4	09	(United States) Jason Alexandridis	1–2, 4, 8, 10
Aston Martin	(United States) TRG-AMR	Vantage GT4	7	(United States) Sean Gibbons	2
Aston Martin	(United States) TRG-AMR	Vantage GT4	77	(United States) Greg Milzcik	10–11
Aston Martin	(United States) Stephen Cameron Racing	Vantage GT4	5	(United States) Ari Balogh	11
Audi	(Canada) Compass360 Racing	TT-RS	73	(Brazil) Pierre Kleinubing	2
Chevrolet	(United States) Blackdog Speed Shop	Camaro Z/28.R	10	(United States) Lawson Aschenbach	All
Chevrolet	(United States) Blackdog Speed Shop	Camaro Z/28.R	10	(Canada) Kyle Marcelli	10 (PO)
Chevrolet	(United States) Blackdog Speed Shop	Camaro Z/28.R	11	(United States) Tony Gaples	All
Chevrolet	(United States) Breathless Racing	Camaro	71	(United States) Dave Ricci	4
Ford	(United States) Roush Performance Road Racing	Mustang Boss 302	14	(United States) Nate Stacy	All
Ford	(United States) Roush Performance Road Racing	Mustang Boss 302	60	(United States) Jack Roush Jr.	All
Ford	(United States) Calvert Dynamics	Mustang Boss 302	37	(United States) Andrew Aquilante	11
Ford	(United States) Breathless Racing	Mustang	98	(United States) Ernie Francis Jr.	4–5, 7
Ginetta	(United States) Performance Motorsports Group	G55 GT4	19	(United States) Parker Chase	All
Ginetta	(United States) Performance Motorsports Group	G55 GT4	29	(United States) Harry Gottsacker	4, 6–11
Ginetta	(United States) Performance Motorsports Group	G55 GT4	34	(United States) Nick Esayian	1
Ginetta	(United States) Ginetta USA	G55 GT4	55	(Brazil) Alline Cipriani	4
KTM	(Canada) Mantella Autosport Inc.	X-Bow GT4	8	(Canada) Anthony Mantella	All
KTM	(Canada) Mantella Autosport Inc.	X-Bow GT4	80	(Canada) Martin Barkey	All
KTM	(United States) ANSA Motorsports	X-Bow GT4	9	(United States) Bill Ziegler	6–11
KTM	(United States) ANSA Motorsports	X-Bow GT4	12	(United States) Dore Chaponick Jr.	1–2, 4–5, 9
KTM	(United States) ANSA Motorsports	X-Bow GT4	12	(United States) Hugh Plumb	6, 10
KTM	(United States) ANSA Motorsports	X-Bow GT4	12	(United States) Jason Wolfe	11
KTM	(United States) ANSA Motorsports	X-Bow GT4	13	(United States) Brett Sandberg	All
Lotus	(United States) VSA Motorsports	Evora GT4	44	(United States) Kevin Marshall	All
Lotus	(United States) SDR Motorsports	Evora GT4	46	(United States) Scott Dollahite	1, 4–11
Maserati	(United States) Klenin Performance Racing	GranTurismo MC	62	(United States) Mark Klenin	All
Maserati	(United States) Racing for Children's	GranTurismo MC	66	(United States) Clint Guthrie	4
Maserati	(United States) RT Motorsports	GranTurismo MC	93	(United States) Ron Ballard	1, 4, 7, 9–11
Maserati	(United States) RT Motorsports	GranTurismo MC	93	(United States) Charles Espenlaub	2
Maserati	(United States) JCR Motorsports	GranTurismo MC	99	(United States) Jeff Courtney	1–2, 4, 7–11
Nissan	(United States) CA Sport	370Z NISMO	23	(Bulgaria) Vesko Kozarov	9
Porsche	(United States) Global Motorsports Group	Cayman GT4 Clubsport	4	(United States) James Sofronas	11
Porsche	(United States) John Allen Racing	Cayman	16	(United States) John Allen	4
SIN	(United States) Racers Edge Motorsports	R1 GT4	45	(United States) Patrick Byrne	1
SIN	(United States) Racers Edge Motorsports	R1 GT4	45	(United States) Chris Beaufait	4–5, 7, 9, 11 (Note: Although Chris Beaufait was listed as an official entry in Rounds 4, 5, 7 and 9, he only drove in Practice.)
SIN	(United States) Racers Edge Motorsports	R1 GT4	45	(United States) Jade Buford	4, 6–10
SIN	(United States) Racers Edge Motorsports	R1 GT4	45	(Canada) James Vance	5
SIN	(United States) Racers Edge Motorsports	R1 GT4	54	(United States) Bob Michaelian	1
SIN	(United States) Racers Edge Motorsports	R1 GT4	54	(United States) Conner Kearby	1 (PO)
SIN	(United States) Racers Edge Motorsports	R1 GT4	54	(United States) Scott Heckert	4–11

=== TC/TCA/TCB ===
Constructor	Team	Car	No.	Driver	Rounds
BMW	(United States) Summit of Everest Motorsports	M235i Racing	05	(United States) Max Fedler	7, 9, 11
BMW	(United States) Stephen Cameron Racing	M235i Racing	19	(United States) Ari Balogh	11
BMW	(United States) Stephen Cameron Racing	M235i Racing	87	(United States) Henry Schmitt	11
BMW	(United States) Classic BMW Motorsports	M235i Racing	26	(United States) Toby Grahovec	All
BMW	(United States) Classic BMW Motorsports	M235i Racing	27	(United States) Gino Carini	1, 5, 7, 9, 11
BMW	(United States) Classic BMW Motorsports	M235i Racing	27	(United States) John Roberts	6
Chevrolet	(United States) Tech Sport Racing	Sonic	24	(United States) Michael Johnson	1, 5, 7, 11
Chevrolet	(United States) Tech Sport Racing	Sonic	24	(United States) Zack Kelly	6
Chevrolet	(United States) Tech Sport Racing	Sonic	24	(United States) Canaan O'Connell	9
Chevrolet	(United States) Tech Sport Racing	Sonic	25	(Canada) P. J. Groenke	All
Ford	(United States) Breathless Racing	Mustang V6	10	(Peru) Ricardo Flores Jr.	1
Ford	(United States) Ian Lacy Racing	Mustang V6	43	(United States) Steve Burns	1, 5, 7, 9, 11
Honda	(United States) Drengler Racing	Fit	01	(United States) Jasper Drengler	All
Honda	(United States) M&S Racing	Civic Si	6	(Canada) Gary Kwok	5
Honda	(United States) Shea Racing	Accord V6 Coupe	7	(United States) Jason Fichter	All
Honda	(United States) Shea Racing	Civic Si	66	(United States) Tom Noble	5, 7
Honda	(United States) Shea Racing	Civic Si	66	(Denmark) Johan Schwartz	6, 9
Honda	(United States) Shea Racing	Accord V6 Coupe	67	(United States) Shea Holbrook	All
Honda	(United States) The Precision Motorsports Group	Fit	18	(United States) Patrick Wilmot	9, 11
Honda	(Canada) Team Ost Racing	Civic Si	32	(Canada) Patrick Seguin	1
Honda	(Canada) Team Ost Racing	Civic Si	39	(Canada) Marc-André Seguin	1
Honda	(Canada) Team Ost Racing	Civic Si	38	(Canada) Samantha Tan	1
Honda	(Canada) Samantha Tan Racing	Civic Si	38	(Canada) Samantha Tan	5, 7, 9, 11
Honda	(United States) Parallax Racing	Accord V6 Coupe	40	(United States) Steve Kohli	1, 5, 7, 9
Honda	(United States) Rains Racing	Accord V6 Coupe	44	(United States) Andrew Rains	1, 7, 11
Honda	(United States) Prostate Cancer Awareness/B. P. R.	Civic Si	46	(Denmark) Johan Schwartz	1, 5
Honda	(United States) PWC & LDL Speed Shop	Civic Si	51	(United States) Paul Whiting	1, 7, 9, 11
Honda	(Canada) Honda Ste-Rose Racing	Accord V6 Coupe	91	(Canada) Nick Wittmer	All
Honda	(United States) Team HMA	Accord V6 Coupe	93	(United States) Paul Street	1, 7, 11
Honda	(United States) Black Armor Helmets	Fit	94	(United States) Tom O'Gorman	1, 5, 7, 9, 11
Kia	(United States) Kinetic Motorsports	Forte Koup	12	(United States) Jason Wolfe	1, 5, 9
Kia	(United States) Kinetic Motorsports	Forte Koup	35	(United States) Kris Wright	1, 5–7, 9
Lotus	(Germany) KRÜGSPEED Racing	Exige	4	(United States) Dennis Hanratty Jr.	5–7
Mazda	(United States) BERG Racing	MX-5	5	(United States) John Weisberg	All
Mazda	(United States) BERG Racing	MX-5 Cup	16	(United States) Jay Salinsky	1, 5, 7, 9, 11
Mazda	(United States) BERG Racing	MX-5	50	(United States) Dinah Weisberg	All
Mazda	(United States) Atlanta Motorsports Group	MX-5 Cup	9	(United States) Forrest Landy	5, 9, 11
Mazda	(United States) Atlanta Motorsports Group	MX-5 Cup	48	(United States) Sam Adams	7
Mazda	(United States) Atlanta Motorsports Group	MX-5 Cup	48	(United States) Mason Filippi	9, 11
Mazda	(United States) Atlanta Motorsports Group	MX-5 Cup	49	(United States) Joey Bickers	All
Mazda	(United States) Atlanta Motorsports Group	MX-5	54	(United States) Patrick Gallagher	All
Mazda	(United States) Hale Motorsports	Demio	14	(United States) Henry Morse	All
Mazda	(United States) Hale Motorsports	MX-5	17	(United States) Randy Hale	1, 5–7, 11
Mazda	(United States) Hale Motorsports	MX-5	47	(United States) Joey Jordan	1
Mazda	(United States) Hale Motorsports	Demio	65	(United States) Will Rodgers	1, 5–6, 11
Mazda	(United States) Hale Motorsports	Demio	65	(United States) Noah Grey	7
Mazda	(United States) Tech Sport Racing	MX-5 Cup	21	(United States) Drake Kemper	1
Mazda	(United States) Tech Sport Racing	MX-5 Cup	21	(United States) Jonathan Goring	5–6
Mazda	(United States) Tech Sport Racing	MX-5 Cup	21	(United States) Steven Streimer	9
Mazda	(United States) Tech Sport Racing	MX-5 Cup	21	(United States) Perry Richardson	11
Mazda	(United States) Tech Sport Racing	MX-5 Cup	22	(United States) Kevin Anderson	1, 5–7, 9
Mazda	(United States) Tech Sport Racing	MX-5 Cup	22	(United States) Warren Dexter	11
Mazda	(United States) Tech Sport Racing	MX-5 Cup	23	(United States) Eric Powell	All
Mazda	(United States) Black Armor Helmets	Demio	28	(United States) Stephanie Anderson	7
Mazda	(United States) Black Armor Helmets	Demio	37	(United States) Blake Thompson	1, 7
Mazda	(United States) Black Armor Helmets	Demio	55	(United States) James Wilson	1, 5, 7, 9, 11
Mazda	(United States) Black Armor Helmets	Demio	75	(United States) Steve Taake	1
Mazda	(United States) Doghouse Performance	MX-5	33	(United States) Adam Poland	1, 5–6, 9, 11
Mazda	(United States) S. A. C. Racing	MX-5 Cup	36	(United States) Daniel Williams	1, 5, 7, 9, 11
Mazda	(United States) S. A. C. Racing	MX-5	69	(United States) Anthony Geraci	All
Mazda	(United States) S. A. C. Racing	MX-5 Cup	70	(United States) Elivan Goulart	All
Mazda	(United States) S. A. C. Racing	MX-5	73	(United States) Daniel Moen	All
Mazda	(United States) S. A. C. Racing	MX-5 Cup	74	(United States) Matt Fassnacht	All
Mazda	(United States) Snader Racing	MX-5	64	(United States) Austin Snader	1, 7
Mazda	(United States) Breathless Racing	Demio	68	(United States) Ted Hough	1, 5, 7, 9, 11
Mazda	(United States) Breathless Racing	MX-5	98	(United States) Ernie Francis Jr.	1
Mazda	(United States) Patterson Racing	MX-5 Cup	79	(United States) Spencer Patterson	6–7, 9
Mini	(United States) The Precision Motorsports Group	Cooper	18	(United States) Patrick Wilmot	1, 5, 7
Mini	(United States) 4R Motorsports	Cooper	20	(United States) Nic Lougee	11
Mini	(United States) Indian Summer Racing	Cooper	30	(United States) Travis Washay	6–7
Mini	(Canada) Team Octane	Cooper	45	(Canada) Alain Lauziere	5
Nissan	(United States) CA Sport	370Z	3	(Bulgaria) Vesko Kozarov	1, 7, 9, 11
Nissan	(United States) CA Sport	370Z	34	(Sweden) Carl Rydquist	1
Nissan	(United States) CA Sport	370Z	34	(United States) Lara Tallman	7
Nissan	(United States) CA Sport	370Z	34	(Trinidad and Tobago) Kristian Boodoosingh	9
Nissan	(United States) Brass Monkey Racing	370Z	97	(United States) Tony Rivera	All
Porsche	(United States) Outlier/Scion Group	Cayman	88	(United States) Kevin Krauss	1, 5, 7, 9, 11
Porsche	(United States) Outlier/Scion Group	Cayman	99	(United States) Brian Lift	5, 7, 9, 11
Toyota	(Canada) WestWorld Motorsports	FR-S	71	(Canada) Daryl Harr	11

Colour	Class
	TC
	TCA
	TCB

== Race results ==
Round		Circuit	GT Winning Car	GTA Winning Car	GT Cup Winning Car	GTS Winning Car	TC Winning Car	TCA Winning Car	TCB Winning Car
Round		Circuit	GT Winning Driver	GTA Winning Driver	GT Cup Winning Driver	GTS Winning Driver	TC Winning Driver	TCA Winning Driver	TCB Winning Driver
1	R1	Austin	#31 Porsche 911 GT3 R	#07 Ferrari 458 Italia GT3	#17 Porsche 911 GT3 Cup	#10 Chevrolet Camaro Z/28.R	#3 Nissan 370Z	#70 Mazda MX-5 Cup	#68 Mazda Demio
1	R1	Austin	(United States) Patrick Long	(Mexico) Martín Fuentes	(United States) Alec Udell	(United States) Lawson Aschenbach	(Bulgaria) Vesko Kozarov	(United States) Elivan Goulart	(United States) Ted Hough
1	R2	Austin	#3 Cadillac ATS-V.R GT3	#07 Ferrari 458 Italia GT3	#20 Porsche 911 GT3 Cup	#13 KTM X-Bow GT4	#26 BMW M235iR	#12 Kia Forte Koup	#65 Mazda Demio
1	R2	Austin	(United States) Johnny O'Connell	(Mexico) Martín Fuentes	(United States) Sloan Urry	(United States) Brett Sandberg	(United States) Toby Grahovec	(United States) Jason Wolfe	(United States) Will Rodgers
2	R1	St. Petersburg	#41 Porsche 911 GT3 R	#07 Ferrari 458 Italia GT3	#20 Porsche 911 GT3 Cup	#60 Ford Mustang Boss 302	Did not participate		
2	R1	St. Petersburg	(United States) Michael Lewis	(Mexico) Martín Fuentes	(United States) Sloan Urry	(United States) Jack Roush Jr.	Did not participate		
2	R2	St. Petersburg	#41 Porsche 911 GT3 R	#07 Ferrari 458 Italia GT3	#20 Porsche 911 GT3 Cup	#60 Ford Mustang Boss 302	Did not participate		
2	R2	St. Petersburg	(United States) Michael Lewis	(Mexico) Martín Fuentes	(United States) Sloan Urry	(United States) Jack Roush Jr.	Did not participate		
3		Long Beach	#9 McLaren 650S GT3	#07 Ferrari 458 Italia GT3	Did not participate				
3		Long Beach	(Portugal) Álvaro Parente	(Mexico) Martín Fuentes	Did not participate				
4	R1	Barber	#9 McLaren 650S GT3	#07 Ferrari 458 Italia GT3	#17 Porsche 911 GT3 Cup	#45 SIN R1 GT4	Did not participate		
4	R1	Barber	(Portugal) Álvaro Parente	(Mexico) Martín Fuentes	(United States) Alec Udell	(United States) Jade Buford	Did not participate		
4	R2	Barber	#8 Cadillac ATS-V.R GT3	#07 Ferrari 458 Italia GT3	#17 Porsche 911 GT3 Cup	#45 SIN R1 GT4	Did not participate		
4	R2	Barber	(United States) Michael Cooper	(Mexico) Martín Fuentes	(United States) Alec Udell	(United States) Jade Buford	Did not participate		
5	R1	Mosport	#58 Porsche 911 GT3 R	#16 Porsche 911 GT3 R	#17 Porsche 911 GT3 Cup	#10 Chevrolet Camaro Z/28.R	#91 Honda Accord V6 Coupe	#70 Mazda MX-5 Cup	#14 Mazda Demio
5	R1	Mosport	(United States) Patrick Long	(United States) Michael Schein	(United States) Alec Udell	(United States) Lawson Aschenbach	(Canada) Nick Wittmer	(United States) Elivan Goulart	(United States) Henry Morse
5	R2	Mosport	#58 Porsche 911 GT3 R	#16 Porsche 911 GT3 R	#09 Porsche 911 GT3 Cup	#07 Aston Martin Vantage GT4	#26 BMW M235iR	#70 Mazda MX-5 Cup	#65 Mazda Demio
5	R2	Mosport	(United States) Patrick Long	(United States) Michael Schein	(Canada) Chris Green	(Canada) Max Riddle	(United States) Toby Grahovec	(United States) Elivan Goulart	(United States) Will Rodgers
6	R1	Lime Rock	#9 McLaren 650S GT3	#16 Porsche 911 GT3 R	#20 Porsche 911 GT3 Cup	#10 Chevrolet Camaro Z/28.R	#91 Honda Accord V6 Coupe	#70 Mazda MX-5 Cup	#65 Mazda Demio
6	R1	Lime Rock	(Portugal) Álvaro Parente	(United States) Michael Schein	(United States) Sloan Urry	(United States) Lawson Aschenbach	(Canada) Nick Wittmer	(United States) Elivan Goulart	(United States) Will Rodgers
6	R2	Lime Rock	#9 McLaren 650S GT3	#07 Ferrari 458 Italia GT3	#17 Porsche 911 GT3 Cup	#45 SIN R1 GT4	#69 Mazda MX-5	#70 Mazda MX-5 Cup	#30 Mini Cooper
6	R2	Lime Rock	(Portugal) Álvaro Parente	(Mexico) Martín Fuentes	(United States) Alec Udell	(United States) Jade Buford	(United States) Anthony Geraci	(United States) Elivan Goulart	(United States) Travis Washay
7	R1	Road America	#43 Acura TLX-GT	#16 Porsche 911 GT3 R	#17 Porsche 911 GT3 Cup	#09 Aston Martin Vantage GT4	#97 Nissan 370Z	#49 Mazda MX-5 Cup	#94 Honda Fit
7	R1	Road America	(United States) Ryan Eversley	(United States) Michael Schein	(United States) Alec Udell	(United States) Derek DeBoer	(United States) Tony Rivera	(United States) Joey Bickers	(United States) Tom O'Gorman
7	R2	Road America	#43 Acura TLX-GT	#66 Mercedes-Benz SLS AMG GT3	#17 Porsche 911 GT3 Cup	#13 KTM X-Bow GT4	#97 Nissan 370Z	#49 Mazda MX-5 Cup	#94 Honda Fit
7	R2	Road America	(United States) Ryan Eversley	(United States) Frank Montecalvo	(United States) Alec Udell	(United States) Brett Sandberg	(United States) Tony Rivera	(United States) Joey Bickers	(United States) Tom O'Gorman
8	R1	Mid-Ohio	#9 McLaren 650S GT3	#16 Porsche 911 GT3 R	#17 Porsche 911 GT3 Cup	Race cancelled due to heavy rain	Did not participate		
8	R1	Mid-Ohio	(Portugal) Álvaro Parente	(United States) Michael Schein	(United States) Alec Udell	Race cancelled due to heavy rain	Did not participate		
8	R2	Mid-Ohio	#8 Cadillac ATS-V.R GT3	#16 Porsche 911 GT3 R	#17 Porsche 911 GT3 Cup	#10 Chevrolet Camaro Z/28.R	Did not participate		
8	R2	Mid-Ohio	(United States) Michael Cooper	(United States) Michael Schein	(United States) Alec Udell	(United States) Lawson Aschenbach	Did not participate		
9	R1	Utah	#05 Nissan GT-R GT3	#66 Mercedes-Benz SLS AMG GT3	#20 Porsche 911 GT3 Cup	#8 KTM X-Bow GT4	#33 Mazda MX-5	#12 Kia Forte Koup	#94 Honda Fit
9	R1	Utah	(United States) Bryan Heitkotter	(United States) Frank Montecalvo	(United States) Sloan Urry	(Canada) Anthony Mantella	(United States) Adam Poland	(United States) Jason Wolfe	(United States) Tom O'Gorman
9	R2	Utah	#05 Nissan GT-R GT3	#07 Ferrari 458 Italia GT3	#17 Porsche 911 GT3 Cup	#54 SIN R1 GT4	#5 Mazda MX-5	#12 Kia Forte Koup	#94 Honda Fit
9	R2	Utah	(United States) Bryan Heitkotter	(Mexico) Martín Fuentes	(United States) Alec Udell	(United States) Scott Heckert	(United States) John Weisberg	(United States) Jason Wolfe	(United States) Tom O'Gorman
10	R1	Sonoma	#3 Cadillac ATS-V.R GT3	#16 Porsche 911 GT3 R	#17 Porsche 911 GT3 Cup	#14 Ford Mustang Boss 302	Did not participate		
10	R1	Sonoma	(United States) Johnny O'Connell	(United States) Michael Schein	(United States) Alec Udell	(United States) Nate Stacy	Did not participate		
10	R2	Sonoma	#3 Cadillac ATS-V.R GT3	#16 Porsche 911 GT3 R	#17 Porsche 911 GT3 Cup	#13 KTM X-Bow GT4	Did not participate		
10	R2	Sonoma	(United States) Johnny O'Connell	(United States) Michael Schein	(United States) Alec Udell	(United States) Brett Sandberg	Did not participate		
11	R1 (Note: The first GTS race at Laguna Seca was a replacement for the cancelled first GTS race at Mid-Ohio. Only those who entered at Mid-Ohio were allowed to run the first GTS race at Laguna Seca.)	Laguna Seca	#9 McLaren 650S GT3	#79 Porsche 911 GT3 R	#00 Porsche 911 GT3 Cup	#80 KTM X-Bow GT4	#54 Mazda MX-5	#23 Mazda MX-5 Cup	#65 Mazda Demio
11	R1	Laguna Seca	(Portugal) Álvaro Parente	(United States) Cooper MacNeil	(United States) Corey Fergus	(Canada) Martin Barkey	(United States) Patrick Gallagher	(United States) Eric Powell	(United States) Will Rodgers
11	R2	Laguna Seca	Did not participate			#54 SIN R1 GT4	#54 Mazda MX-5	#49 Mazda MX-5 Cup	#65 Mazda Demio
11	R2	Laguna Seca	Did not participate			(United States) Scott Heckert	(United States) Patrick Gallagher	(United States) Joey Bickers	(United States) Will Rodgers

== Championship standings ==
=== Drivers' championships ===
Points were awarded based on finishing positions as shown in the chart below. The driver had to complete at least 50% of the class winner's number of laps to receive points. The Pole position winner of every class received 7 points with the exception of the GTA class.

Position	1	2	3	4	5	6	7	8	9	10	11	12	13	14	15	16	17	18	19	20	21	22	23	24	25	26	27	28	29	30	31	32	33	34	35	36	37	38	39	40
Race	110	98	90	84	80	76	72	68	64	60	57	54	51	48	45	43	41	39	37	35	33	31	29	27	25	23	21	19	17	15	13	11	9	7	6	5	4	3	2	1

==== GT ====
Pos.	Driver	Car	AUS		STP		LBH	BAR		MOS		LIM		ELK		MOH		UTA		SON		LAG	Points
1	(Portugal) Álvaro Parente	McLaren 650S GT3	6	8	2	18	**1**	1	**2**	8	6	**1**	1^{1}	6	6	1	**14**	**18**†	11	4	2	1	1657
2	(United States) Patrick Long	Porsche 911 GT3 R	**1**	26†	7	4	3	5	4	**1**	**1**	7	2	4	5	12	9	3	3	8	4	4	1629
3	(United States) Michael Cooper	Cadillac ATS-V.R GT3	3	2	4	3	15	**2**	1	11	8	8	14	7	3	7	1	15	6	3	21	2	1549
4	(United States) Johnny O'Connell	Cadillac ATS-V.R GT3	5	1	3	5	2	3	3	12	10	3	17	19	20	6	3	14	10	1	1	**5**	1538
5	(United States) Bryan Heitkotter	Nissan GT-R GT3	2	**19**	9	15	19†	6	6	7	5	10	7	20	19	3	4	1	1	7	5	3	1397
6	(United States) Ryan Eversley	Acura TLX-GT	10	12	10	6	7	20	12	3	18†	6	4	1	**1**	5	2	4	17	10	12	10	1365
7	(Australia) J. D. Davison	Nissan GT-R GT3	4	13	19	2	4	4	8	5	2	12	5	5	18	17†	5	(Note: J. D. Davison had been suspended at Utah Motorsports Campus after making avoidable contact at Mid-Ohio while on probation.)		11	7	7	1210
8	(United States) Austin Cindric	McLaren 650S GT3	12	14	5	19	22†	14	14	9	7	11	8	9	17	**2**	18	6	12	**2**	**3**	18	1198
9	(Hong Kong) Adderly Fong	Bentley Continental GT3	14	17	14	12	9	10	7	4	19†	4	6	**3**	2	19†	10	2	2	9	20		1181
10	(Canada) Kyle Marcelli	Audi R8 LMS ultra	11	5	11	11	5	11	9	6	4	2	3	8	13	15†	13	11	9	22	11	23†	1179
11	(United States) Michael Lewis	Porsche 911 GT3 R	7	20	**1**	**1**	6	7	5					10	14	8	6	17	**4**	5	6	11	1166
12	(United States) Jon Fogarty	McLaren 650S GT3	23	3	6	9	Wth	12	13	16	16	9	9	12	12	4	7	7	5	6	24†	6	1146
13	(Mexico) Martín Fuentes	Ferrari 458 Italia GT3	13	6	16	13	8	15	16	15	13	15	12	21†	21	10	12	12	13	13	23†	25†	877
14	(United States) Michael Schein	Porsche 911 GT3 R	17	25				16	18	14	11	14	15	13	11	9	11	13	14	12	13	17	816
15	(United States) Colin Thompson	McLaren 650S GT3	9	4	17	8	17	22†	DNS	17	14	18	11	18	8	14†	DNS	5	7	24†	9	19	806
16	(United States) Andrew Davis	Porsche 911 GT3 R	18	7	8	10	18	9	11	10	9	13	10	11	9								755
17	(United States) Andrew Palmer	Bentley Continental GT3	8	10	12	7	10	8	10	2	3	5	**DNS**										717
18	(United States) Peter Cunningham	Acura TLX-GT	15	18	13	14	12	13	15	13	12			2	4								620
19	(United States) Frankie Montecalvo	Mercedes-Benz SLS AMG GT3	20	11	18	17	16	19	19	DNS	15	19†	16	14	7	Wth	Wth	9	16				604
20	(United States) Brent Holden	Audi R8 LMS ultra					13																289
20	(United States) Brent Holden	Porsche 911 GT3 R								19	DNS							16	15	23	17	16	289
21	(United States) James Sofronas	Porsche 911 GT3 R	24†	9			21†					16	13	15	10			Wth	Wth	Wth	Wth		263
22	(Mexico) Jorge De La Torre	Aston Martin V12 Vantage GT3	22	23	Wth	Wth	14	Wth	Wth	20	17	17	DNS									20	254
23	(United States) Drew Regitz	Audi R8 LMS ultra	19	24				17	17					Wth	Wth					20	18	21	247
24	(United States) Andy Wilzoch	Porsche 911 GT3 R												16	16					17	19	15	211
25	(United States) Joseph Toussaint	Porsche 997 GT3 R	26†	22				18	20							11	17						203
26	(United States) Spencer Pumpelly	Acura TLX-GT														16†	8	8	18†			9	200
27	(United States) Tim Pappas	Dodge Viper GT3-R	Wth	Wth			11																151
27	(United States) Tim Pappas	Porsche 911 GT3 R																		16	22†	13	151
28	(United States) Cooper MacNeil	Porsche 911 GT3 R																		14	15	12	147
29	(United States) Gunnar Jeannette	Porsche 911 GT3 R																		21	16	8	144
30	(South Korea) Andrew Kim	Bentley Continental GT3																		18	14	14	135
31	(United States) Duncan Ende	Aston Martin V12 Vantage GT3	25†	16	15	16	Wth																131
32	(United Kingdom) Craig Dolby	Nissan GT-R GT3																10	8				128
33	(United States) Jonathan Summerton	Mercedes-Benz SLS AMG GT3																		19	8	DNS	105
34	(Netherlands) Peter Kox	Acura TLX-GT																		15	10		105
35	(United States) Walt Bowlin	Audi R8 LMS	21					21	21					22†									99
36	(United States) Preston Calvert	Porsche 911 GT3 R														13	16	Wth	Wth				94
37	(United States) Michael Mills	BMW Z4 GT3	16	15																			88
38	(United States) Michael McCann	Dodge Viper GT3-R												17	22†	18†	15					Wth	86
39	(United States) Bret Curtis	BMW M6 GT3								18	DNS												39
40	(United States) Larry Pegram	Audi R8 LMS		21																			33
41	(United States) Bill Sweedler	Ferrari 458 Italia GT3					20†																0
42	(Germany) Fabian Hamprecht	Bentley Continental GT3																				22†	0
43	(United States) Mike Skeen	Dodge Viper GT3-R																				24†	0
	(United States) Caesar Bacarella	Aston Martin V12 Vantage GT3														Wth	Wth						0
Drivers ineligible for GT championship points
	(South Africa) Dion von Moltke	Audi R8 LMS													15								
Pos.	Driver	Car	AUS		STP		LBH	BAR		MOS		LIM		ELK		MOH		UTA		SON		LAG	Points

Color	Result
Gold	Winner
Silver	2nd place
Bronze	3rd place
Green	4th & 5th place
Light Blue	6th–10th place
Dark Blue	Finished (Outside Top 10)
Purple	Did not finish
Red	Did not qualify (DNQ)
Brown	Withdrawn (Wth)
Black	Disqualified; Excluded (DSQ/EX)
White	Did not start (DNS)
Light Cyan	Practice only (PO)
Blank	Did not participate

. – GTA class
**Bold** – Pole position
Italics – Fastest Lap

Notes

- ^{1} – Andrew Palmer set the fastest lap in Race 1 and would therefore inherit pole position for Race 2 and the seven points that comes with it. Palmer was involved in a horrific accident together with Jorge De La Torre in the warm-up session prior to Race 2. Álvaro Parente set the second fastest lap in Race 1 and since Palmer did not start the race he took pole position for Race 2 and was awarded seven points that comes with it. This was corrected prior to the season finale at Laguna Seca following a points audit by SCCA and WC Vision.
- Results denoted by † did not complete sufficient laps in order to score points.

==== GTA ====
Pos.	Driver	Car	AUS		STP		LBH	BAR		MOS		LIM		ELK		MOH		UTA		SON		LAG	Points
1	(Mexico) Martín Fuentes	Ferrari 458 Italia GT3	**1**	**1**	**1**	**1**	**1**	**1**	1	2	2	**2**	**1**	5†	4	2	2	2	1	**2**	8†	9†	1760
2	(United States) Michael Schein	Porsche 911 GT3 R	3	8				2	3	**1**	**1**	1	2	1	2	**1**	**1**	3	2	1	**1**	6	1686
3	(United States) Frankie Montecalvo	Mercedes-Benz SLS AMG GT3	5	2	2	2	5	5	**4**	DNS	3	4†	3	**2**	**1**	Wth	Wth	**1**	**4**				1200
4	(United States) Brent Holden	Audi R8 LMS ultra					3																580
4	(United States) Brent Holden	Porsche 911 GT3 R								4	DNS							4	3	8	4	5	580
5	(United States) Drew Regitz	Audi R8 LMS ultra	4	7				3	2					Wth	Wth					7	5	8	564
6	(Mexico) Jorge De La Torre	Aston Martin V12 Vantage GT3	7	6	Wth	Wth	4	Wth	Wth	5	4	3	DNS									7	558
7	(United States) Andy Wilzoch	Porsche 911 GT3 R												3	3					5	6	4	420
8	(United States) Joseph Toussaint	Porsche 997 GT3 R	8†	5				4	5							3	5						414
9	(United States) Cooper MacNeil	Porsche 911 GT3 R																		3	3	**1**	290
10	(United States) Tim Pappas	Dodge Viper GT3-R	Wth	Wth			2																280
10	(United States) Tim Pappas	Porsche 911 GT3 R																		4	7†	2	280
11	(South Korea) Andrew Kim	Bentley Continental GT3																		6	2	3	264
12	(United States) Walt Bowlin	Audi R8 LMS	6					6	6					6†									228
13	(United States) Michael Mills	BMW Z4 GT3	2	3																			188
14	(United States) Michael McCann	Dodge Viper GT3-R												4	5†	5†	3					Wth	174
15	(United States) Preston Calvert	Porsche 911 GT3 R														4	4						168
16	(United States) Bret Curtis	BMW M6 GT3								3	DNS												90
17	(United States) Larry Pegram	Audi R8 LMS		4																			84
18	(United States) Bill Sweedler	Ferrari 458 Italia GT3					6†																0
	(United States) Caesar Bacarella	Aston Martin V12 Vantage GT3														Wth	Wth						0
Pos.	Driver	Car	AUS		STP		LBH	BAR		MOS		LIM		ELK		MOH		UTA		SON		LAG	Points

Notes

- Results denoted by † did not complete sufficient laps in order to score points.

==== GT Cup ====
Every driver competes in a Porsche 911 GT3 Cup.

Pos.	Driver	AUS		STP		BAR		MOS		LIM		ELK		MOH		UTA		SON		LAG	Points
1	(United States) Alec Udell	1	2	2	2	**1**	**1**	1	2	2	1	**1**	**1**	**1**	1	**2**	**1**	**1**	**1**		1971
2	(United States) Sloan Urry	**2**	**1**	**1**	**1**	3	2	2	3	**1**	**2**	2	2	2	**2**	1	5	2	2	2	1937
3	(United States) Corey Fergus	4	4	4	4†	2	4	3	4	3	3	3	3	3	3	5	3	4	4	**1**	1603
4	(United States) Preston Calvert	7	7	3	3	4	3	5	5	4	4	5	5					5	5		1146
5	(United States) Alex Welch	5	6									4	4			4	4	Wth	Wth	DNS	492
6	(Canada) Chris Green							**4**	**1**												180
7	(United States) McKay Snow															3	2				188
8	(United States) Will Hardeman	3	3																		180
9	(United States) Mike Hedlund																	3	3		180
10	(United States) Anthony Imperato	6	5																		156
11	(United States) Chris Thompson																			3	90
Pos.	Driver	AUS		STP		BAR		MOS		LIM		ELK		MOH		UTA		SON		LAG	Points

Notes

- Results denoted by † did not complete sufficient laps in order to score points.

==== GTS ====
Pos.	Driver	Car	AUS		STP		BAR		MOS		LIM		ELK		MOH	UTA		SON		LAG		Points
1	(United States) Brett Sandberg	KTM X-Bow GT4	6	**1**	2	**2**	13	11	2	**11**	**2**	**11**	16	**1**	**3**	2	3	6	**1**	3	16	1606
2	(United States) Nate Stacy	Ford Mustang Boss 302	2	4	3	10	12	12	9	3	7	7	5	15	2	12	2	1	3	2	3	1501
3	(United States) Lawson Aschenbach	Chevrolet Camaro Z/28.R	1	2	6	5	2	4	**1**	12	1	4	17†	6	1	7	7	7	6	5	19	1479
4	(United States) Parker Chase	Ginetta G55 GT4	3	5	4	3	6	2	10	2	6	6	14	17	12	3	4	2	4	12	4	1465
5	(United States) Scott Heckert	SIN R1 GT4					4	5	5	5	3	15†	6	3	4	**4**	1	4	5	**15**†	**1**	1153
6	(United States) Scott Dollahite	Lotus Evora GT4	**4**	3			3	3	4	14	4	5	4	16	7	6	14	Wth	Wth	14†	6	1056
7	(United States) Mark Klenin	Maserati GranTurismo MC	11	8	13	13†	9	7	11	4	14	9	10	18†	14†	8	12	8	11	8	11	997
8	(United States) Tony Gaples	Chevrolet Camaro Z/28.R	15†	9	9	11	14	14	13	8	15	14†	11	10	8	13	9	10	10	7	10	997
9	(Canada) Martin Barkey	KTM X-Bow GT4	12	DNS	Wth	Wth	11	22†	12	6	10	3	3	13	10	10	6	17†	7	1	17	951
10	(Canada) Anthony Mantella	KTM X-Bow GT4	DSQ	EX	Wth	Wth	7	15	8	9	12	13†	9	11	9	1	**8**	12	2	4	18	948
11	(United States) Jack Roush Jr.	Ford Mustang Boss 302	16†	15	**1**	1	5	8	7	13	5	2	Wth	Wth	5	Wth	Wth	Wth	Wth	Wth	Wth	801
12	(United States) Jeff Courtney	Maserati GranTurismo MC	7	10	8	8	22†	13					8	2	16†	5	15†	9	17	13	7	795
13	(United States) Harry Gottsacker	Ginetta G55 GT4					10	6			13	12†	13	14	6	11	13	14	8	6	5	691
14	(United States) Jade Buford	SIN R1 GT4					**1**	**1**			8	1	**2**	4	15†	Wth	Wth	Wth	Wth	Wth		601
15	(United States) Bill Ziegler	KTM X-Bow GT4									11	8	15	12	13	16†	11	13	13	10	14	542
16	(United States) Dore Chaponick Jr.	KTM X-Bow GT4	10	14	5	7	20	21†	14	7						9	10					539
17	(United States) Kevin Marshall	Lotus Evora GT4	14	7	14	12†	18	9	15	10	DNS	Wth	19†	DNS	Wth	Wth	Wth	5	16	DNS	9	520
18	(Canada) Max Riddle	Aston Martin Vantage GT4	8	6					3	1			18†	5		14†	5				20†	504
19	(United States) Derek DeBoer	Aston Martin Vantage GT4	5			6	17						1	7					9			443
20	(United States) Jason Alexandridis	Aston Martin Vantage GT4		12	12			16							11			11		9		329
21	(United States) Ernie Francis Jr.	Ford Mustang					8	10	Wth	Wth			7	8								268
22	(United States) Hugh Plumb	KTM X-Bow GT4									9	10						**3**	15			266
23	(United States) George Kurtz	Aston Martin Vantage GT4											12	9				15	12		DNS	217
24	(United States) Charles Espenlaub	Maserati GranTurismo MC			7	4																156
25	(United States) Greg Milzcik	Aston Martin Vantage GT4																16	14		15	136
26	(United States) Sean Gibbons	Aston Martin Vantage GT4			10	9																124
27	(United States) Nick Esayian	Ginetta G55 GT4	9	11																		121
28	(United States) Chris Beaufait	SIN R1 GT4					PO	PO	PO	PO			PO	PO		Wth	Wth			11	12	111
29	(United States) Ron Ballard	Maserati GranTurismo MC	13	13									20†	DNS		Wth	Wth	Wth	Wth		DNS	102
30	(United States) Andrew Aquilante	Ford Mustang Boss 302																			2	98
31	(Brazil) Alline Cipriani	Ginetta G55 GT4					15	18														84
32	(United States) John Allen	Porsche Cayman					16	19														80
33	(Canada) James Vance	SIN R1 GT4							6	15†												76
34	(United States) Clint Guthrie	Maserati GranTurismo MC					21	17														74
35	(United States) Dave Ricci	Chevrolet Camaro					19	20														72
36	(United States) Ari Balogh	Aston Martin Vantage GT4																			8	68
37	(Brazil) Pierre Kleinubing	Audi TT-RS			11	14†																57
38	(United States) James Sofronas	Porsche Cayman GT4 Clubsport																			13	51
39	(Bulgaria) Vesko Kozarov	Nissan 370Z NISMO														15†	DNS					0
40	(United States) Bob Michaelian	SIN R1 GT4	17†	DNS																		0
41	(United States) Patrick Byrne	SIN R1 GT4	DNS	DNS																		0
42	(United States) Jason Wolfe	KTM X-Bow GT4																			DNS	0
	(United States) Conner Kearby	SIN R1 GT4	PO	PO																		0
	(Canada) Kyle Marcelli	Chevrolet Camaro Z/28.R																PO	PO			0
Pos.	Driver	Car	AUS		STP		BAR		MOS		LIM		ELK		MOH	UTA		SON		LAG		Points

Notes

- Results denoted by † did not complete sufficient laps in order to score points.

==== TC ====
Drivers that were not able to attend the Lime Rock round of the championship, but competed in all other rounds of the full season, received double points in both races at Laguna Seca. Drivers that participated in the entire 2016 season and entered Lime Rock Park, were able to choose the better of one of the Lime Rock driver points results, or one of their Laguna Seca driver points results, and be given double points for just that round. The driver may drop driver points from one of the other weakest three races from Lime Rock or Laguna Seca only. Points for Pole position for these two rounds are included in the calculation. This applies only to driver points. Results dropped are denoted by parentheses. Results with double points are denoted by ^{x2}.

Pos.	Driver	Car	AUS		MOS		LIM		ELK		UTA		LAG		Points
1	(United States) Toby Grahovec	BMW M235i Racing	2	1	2	1	4	(4)	2	2	3	3	3	3^{x2}	1146
2	(United States) Patrick Gallagher	Mazda MX-5	15	6	4	3	Wth	Wth	4	4	**2**	**2**	**1**^{x2}	**1**^{x2}	1141
3	(Canada) Nick Wittmer	Honda Accord V6 Coupe	**21**	2	1	2	1^{x2}	(7)	3	18	4	11	4	4	971
4	(United States) John Weisberg	Mazda MX-5	17	15	7	6	(3)	2^{x2}	20†	3	9	1	5	20	809
5	(United States) Shea Holbrook	Honda Accord V6 Coupe	10	4	5	9	9	(9†)	5	6	17	8	8^{x2}	12	807
6	(United States) Anthony Geraci	Mazda MX-5	9	11	13	8	2	1^{x2}	21†	DNS	5	7	(14)	8	778
7	(United States) Kevin Krauss	Porsche Cayman	14	13	8	7			17	8	10	9	7^{x2}	5^{x2}	776
8	(United States) Jason Fichter	Honda Accord V6 Coupe	7	7	6	5	Wth	Wth	7	10	13	16†	12^{x2}	19^{x2}	665
9	(United States) Daniel Moen	Mazda MX-5	18	17	14	11	5^{x2}	5	18	15	14	12	(18)	17	652
10	(United States) Adam Poland	Mazda MX-5	5	5	**10**	**4**	**12**†	10†			1	18†	2	2	631
11	(United States) Tony Rivera	Nissan 370Z	4	DSQ	DNS	Wth	11†	11†	**1**	**1**	12	5	20	7	559
12	(United States) Steve Burns	Ford Mustang V6	6	14	DNS	Wth			6	9	6	6	15	13	512
13	(United States) Dinah Weisberg	Mazda MX-5	Wth	Wth	12	12	8	8	15	16	16	13	17	15	512
14	(United States) Gino Carini	BMW M235i Racing	16	12	11	13			10	14	Wth	Wth	16^{x2}	16^{x2}	485
15	(United States) Dennis Hanratty Jr.	Lotus Exige			3	10	6	**3**	13	5					454
16	(United States) Andrew Rains	Honda Accord V6 Coupe	8	8					8	11			6	18	376
17	(United States) Max Fedler	BMW M235i Racing							9	7	8	10	9	14	376
18	(United States) Brian Lift	Porsche Cayman			9	14			16	12	11	14	19	21†	351
19	(Bulgaria) Vesko Kozarov	Nissan 370Z	1	3					11	DNS	15	15†	Wth	Wth	302
20	(United States) Paul Street	Honda Accord V6 Coupe	20	20†					12	19			13	11	234
21	(United States) Randy Hale	Mazda MX-5	13	19	15†	DNS	10†	DNS	22†	20†			10	9	212
22	(Trinidad and Tobago) Kristian Boodoosingh	Nissan 370Z									7	4			156
23	(United States) John Roberts	BMW M235i Racing					7	6							148
24	(Sweden) Carl Rydquist	Nissan 370Z	3	**18**											136
25	(United States) Austin Snader	Mazda MX-5	11	9					Wth	Wth					121
26	(United States) Henry Schmitt	BMW M235i Racing											11	10	117
27	(United States) Joey Jordan	Mazda MX-5	12	10											114
28	(United States) Steve Kohli	Honda Accord V6 Coupe	23†	22†	Wth	Wth			19†	13	18	17†			90
29	(United States) Lara Tallman	Nissan 370Z							14	17					89
30	(United States) Ari Balogh	BMW M235i Racing											21†	6	76
31	(Peru) Ricardo Flores Jr.	Ford Mustang V6	22†	16											43
32	(United States) Ernie Francis Jr.	Mazda MX-5	19	21†											37
Pos.	Driver	Car	AUS		MOS		LIM		ELK		UTA		LAG		Points

Notes

- Results denoted by † did not complete sufficient laps in order to score points.

==== TCA ====
The rules about points received at Lime Rock and Laguna Seca applying to the TC class, applies to the TCA class too.

Pos.	Driver	Car	AUS		MOS		LIM		ELK		UTA		LAG		Points
1	(United States) Elivan Goulart	Mazda MX-5 Cup	1	2	**1**	1	**1**	**1**^{x2}	2	2	3	4	2	(2)	1254
2	(United States) Joey Bickers	Mazda MX-5 Cup	4	3	3	**2**	Wth	Wth	**1**	**1**	**2**	3	3^{x2}	**1**^{x2}	1205
3	(United States) Eric Powell	Mazda MX-5 Cup	3	**4**	8†	3	2	2^{x2}	10	4	11	16	1	(3)	919
4	(United States) Matt Fassnacht	Mazda MX-5 Cup	8	7	2	11†	5^{x2}	6	4	6	DNS	12	5	(9)	825
5	(United States) Jay Salinsky	Mazda MX-5 Cup	10	13	4	8			9	7	14	13	10^{x2}	8^{x2}	754
6	(Canada) Samantha Tan	Honda Civic Si	7	10	6	6			7	8	12	15	11^{x2}	11^{x2}	751
7	(United States) Kevin Anderson	Mazda MX-5 Cup	13†	11	5	9	3	3	5	10	10	14			629
8	(United States) Kris Wright	Kia Forte Koup	12	12	10†	5	4	5	11†	9	13	5			547
9	(United States) Paul Whiting	Honda Civic Si	6	8					6	12†	6	9	**8**	4	519
10	(United States) Spencer Patterson	Mazda MX-5 Cup					6	4	8	5	7	10			440
11	(United States) Jason Wolfe	Kia Forte Koup	2	1	DNS	Wth					1	**1**			435
12	(United States) Forrest Landy	Mazda MX-5 Cup			9†	4					5	6	4	7	396
13	(United States) Daniel Williams	Mazda MX-5 Cup	14†	9	DNS	Wth			13†	13†	9	8	7	6	344
14	(United States) Mason Filippi	Mazda MX-5 Cup									8	7	6	5	296
15	(Denmark) Johan Schwartz	Honda Civic Si	**9**	14†	DNS	Wth	Wth	Wth			4	2			253
16	(United States) Sam Adams	Mazda MX-5 Cup							3	3					180
17	(Canada) Patrick Seguin	Honda Civic Si	5	6											156
18	(United States) Drake Kemper	Mazda MX-5 Cup	11	5											137
19	(United States) Warren Dexter	Mazda MX-5 Cup											9	10	124
20	(Canada) Daryl Harr	Toyota FR-S											12	12	108
21	(Canada) Alain Lauziere	Mini Cooper			11†	7									72
22	(Canada) Gary Kwok	Honda Civic Si			7†	10									60
23	(United States) Steven Streimer	Mazda MX-5 Cup									15†	11			57
24	(United States) Perry Richardson	Mazda MX-5 Cup											13	13†	51
25	(United States) Tom Noble	Honda Civic Si			DNS	Wth			12†	11†					0
26	(United States) Jonathan Goring	Mazda MX-5 Cup			DNS	Wth	Wth	Wth							0
	(Canada) Marc-André Seguin	Honda Civic Si	Wth	Wth											0
Pos.	Driver	Car	AUS		MOS		LIM		ELK		UTA		LAG		Points

Notes

- Results denoted by † did not complete sufficient laps in order to score points.

==== TCB ====
The rules about points received at Lime Rock and Laguna Seca applying to the TC class, applies to the TCB class too.

Pos.	Driver	Car	AUS		MOS		LIM		ELK		UTA		LAG		Points
1	(United States) Tom O'Gorman	Honda Fit	2	2	2	2			**1**	1	**1**	1	2^{x2}	2^{x2}	1188
2	(Canada) P. J. Groenke	Chevrolet Sonic	7	5	4	3	3	3	2	3	5	4	3^{x2}	(8)	1038
3	(United States) Henry Morse	Mazda Demio	3	3	1	8	6	4	6	9	3	**3**	(**10**)^{1}	3^{x2}	1025
4	(United States) Ted Hough	Mazda Demio	**1**	**4**	6	4			5	2	6†	2	7^{x2}	**9**^{x2}	930
5	(United States) James Wilson	Mazda Demio	5	8	9	7			12†	8	4	6	4^{x2}	6^{x2}	832
6	(United States) Jasper Drengler	Honda Fit	10	10	8	6	5	5^{x2}	9	6	7†	7	8	(7)	784
7	(United States) Will Rodgers	Mazda Demio	DSQ	1	**3**	**1**	1	2					1	1	752
8	(United States) Michael Johnson	Chevrolet Sonic	4	6	7	5			3	4			5	4	650
9	(United States) Travis Washay	Mini Cooper					**2**	**1**	8	7					362
10	(United States) Patrick Wilmot	Mini Cooper	8	9	5	9†			10	11					329
10	(United States) Patrick Wilmot	Honda Fit									Wth	Wth	9†	DNS	329
11	(United States) Blake Thompson	Mazda Demio	6	7					7	5					300
12	(United States) Canaan O'Connell	Chevrolet Sonic									2	5			178
13	(United States) Zack Kelly	Chevrolet Sonic					4	6							160
14	(United States) Nic Lougee	Mini Cooper											6	5	156
15	(United States) Noah Grey	Mazda Demio							4	**10**					151
16	(United States) Steve Taake	Mazda Demio	9	11											121
17	(United States) Stephanie Anderson	Mazda Demio							11	12					111
Pos.	Driver	Car	AUS		MOS		LIM		ELK		UTA		LAG		Points

Notes

- Results denoted by † did not complete sufficient laps in order to score points.
- ^{1} – Henry Morse was put in last place of the TCB class per TR.9 GCR9.1.10 after Race 1 at Laguna Seca.

=== Manufacturers' championships ===
Only those manufacturers who are SCCA Pro Racing corporate members were eligible to receive points toward the Manufacturers' Championship. Points were awarded based on finishing positions as shown in the chart below. Only the highest finishing car of each eligible manufacturer earned points for its finishing position.

Position	1	2	3	4	5	6	7	8	9
Race	10	8	7	6	5	4	3	2	1

==== GT ====
Pos.	Manufacturer	Car	AUS		STP		LBH	BAR		MOS		LIM		ELK		MOH		UTA		SON		LAG	Points
1	(United Kingdom) McLaren	650S GT3	6	3	2	8	**1**	1	**2**	8	5	**1**	1	6	6	**1**	**7**	**5**	5	**2**	**2**	1	140
2	(Germany) Porsche	911 GT3 R/997 GT3 R	**1**	7	**1**	**1**	3	5	4	**1**	**1**	7	2	4	5	8	6	3	**3**	5	4	4	136
3	(United States) Cadillac	ATS-V.R GT3	3	1	3	3	2	**2**	1	11	7	3	14	7	3	6	1	14	6	1	1	**2**	124
4	(Japan) Nissan	GT-R GT3	2	**13**	9	2	4	4	6	5	2	10	5	5	18	3	4	1	1	7	5	3	105
5	(United Kingdom) Bentley	Continental GT3	8	10	12	7	9	8	7	2	3	4	**6**	**3**	2	19†	10	2	2	9	14	14	70
6	(Japan) Acura	TLX-GT	10	12	10	6	7	13	12	3	12	6	4	1	**1**	5	2	4	17	10	10	9	65
7	(Germany) Audi	R8 LMS ultra/R8 LMS	11	5	11	11	5	11	9	6	4	2	3	8	13	15†	13	11	9	20	11	21	38
8	(Germany) Mercedes-Benz AMG	SLS AMG GT3	20	11	18	17	16	19	19	DNS	15	19†	16	14	7	Wth	Wth	9	16	19	8	DNS	6
Manufacturers ineligible for GT championship points
	(Italy) Ferrari	458 Italia GT3	13	6	16	13	8	15	16	15	13	15	12	21†	21	10	12	12	13	13	23†	25†	
	(United States) Dodge	Viper GT3-R	Wth	Wth			11							17	22†	18†	15					24†	
	(United Kingdom) Aston Martin	V12 Vantage GT3	22	16	15	16	14	Wth	Wth	20	17	17	DNS			Wth	Wth					20	
	(Germany) BMW	M6 GT3/Z4 GT3	16	15						19	DNS												
Pos.	Driver	Car	AUS		STP		LBH	BAR		MOS		LIM		ELK		MOH		UTA		SON		LAG	Points

Notes

- Results denoted by † did not complete sufficient laps in order to score points.

==== GTS ====
Pos.	Manufacturer	Car	AUS		STP		BAR		MOS		LIM		ELK		MOH	UTA		SON		LAG		Points
1	(United States) Ford	Mustang Boss 302/Mustang	2	4	**1**	1	5	8	7	3	5	2	5	8	2	12	2	1	3	2	2	121
2	(United States) Chevrolet	Camaro Z/28.R/Camaro	1	2	6	5	2	4	**1**	8	1	4	11	6	1	7	7	7	6	5	10	102
3	(United Kingdom) Ginetta	G55 GT4	3	5	4	3	6	2	10	2	6	6	13	14	6	3	4	2	4	6	4	94
4	(Italy) Maserati	GranTurismo MC	7	8	7	4	9	7	11	4	14	9	8	2	14†	5	12	8	11	8	7	47
5	(Germany) Porsche	Cayman/Cayman GT4 Clubsport					16	19													13	0
6	(Japan) Nissan	370Z NISMO														15†	DNS					0
Manufacturers ineligible for GTS championship points
	(Austria) KTM	X-Bow GT4	6	**1**	2	**2**	7	11	2	**6**	**2**	**3**	3	**1**	**3**	1	**3**	**3**	**1**	1	14	
	(Bulgaria) SIN	R1 GT4	17†	DNS			**1**	**1**	5	5	3	1	**2**	3	4	**4**	1	4	5	**11**	**1**	
	(United Kingdom) Aston Martin	Vantage GT4	5	6	10	6	17	16	3	1			1	5	11	14†	5	11	9	9	8	
	(United Kingdom) Lotus	Evora GT4	**4**	3	14	12†	3	3	4	10	4	5	4	16	7	6	14	5	16	14†	6	
	(Germany) Audi	TT-RS			11	14†																
Pos.	Driver	Car	AUS		STP		BAR		MOS		LIM		ELK		MOH	UTA		SON		LAG		Points

Notes

- Results denoted by † did not complete sufficient laps in order to score points.

==== TC ====
Pos.	Manufacturer	Car	AUS		MOS		LIM		ELK		UTA		LAG		Points
1	(Japan) Mazda	MX-5	5	5	**4**	**3**	**2**	1	4	3	**1**	**1**	**1**	**1**	101
2	(Germany) BMW	M235iR	2	1	2	1	4	4	2	2	3	3	3	3	92
3	(Japan) Honda	Accord V6 Coupe	**7**	2	1	2	1	7	3	6	4	8	4	4	74
4	(Japan) Nissan	370Z	1	**3**	DNS	Wth	11†	11†	**1**	**1**	7	4	20	7	52
5	(Germany) Porsche	Cayman	14	13	8	7			16	8	10	9	7	5	16
Manufacturers ineligible for TC championship points
	(United Kingdom) Lotus	Exige			3	10	6	**3**	13	5					
	(United States) Ford	Mustang V6	6	14	DNS	Wth			6	9	6	6	15	13	
Pos.	Driver	Car	AUS		MOS		LIM		ELK		UTA		LAG		Points

Notes

- Results denoted by † did not complete sufficient laps in order to score points.

==== TCA ====
Pos.	Manufacturer	Car	AUS		MOS		LIM		ELK		UTA		LAG		Points
1	(Japan) Mazda	MX-5 Cup	1	**2**	**1**	**1**	**1**	**1**	**1**	**1**	**2**	3	1	**1**	123
2	(South Korea) Kia	Forte Koup	2	1	10†	5	4	5	11†	9	1	**1**			55
3	(Japan) Honda	Civic Si	**5**	6	6	6	Wth	Wth	6	8	4	2	**8**	4	45
Manufacturers ineligible for TCA championship points
	(United Kingdom) / (Germany) Mini	Mini Cooper			11†	7									
	(Japan) Toyota	FR-S											12	12	
Pos.	Driver	Car	AUS		MOS		LIM		ELK		UTA		LAG		Points

Notes

- Results denoted by † did not complete sufficient laps in order to score points.
