= 2016 SprintX GT Championship Series =

Seasons
- ← none 2017 →

The 2016 SprintX GT Championship Series was the inaugural season of the SprintX GT Championship Series. The series was managed by WC Vision and sanctioned by the Sports Car Club of America (SCCA). On May 28, 2015 WC Vision announced it would be launching the SprintX GT Championship Series as a support series of the Pirelli World Challenge. Similar to GT races in the PWC, SprintX races had a sprint format as races were 60 minutes in length. The difference between PWC GT races and SprintX races was that SprintX races featured mandatory driver and tire changes.

== Schedule ==
The season comprised three rounds and all rounds were in support of the Pirelli World Challenge. On the same day WC Vision announced the launch of the series, they announced the series would be run during all "headliner" event weekends of the PWC - the calendar of the 2016 PWC season was announced on November 3, 2015. Later WC Vision decided the series would not run during the season opener of the PWC at Austin and during the PWC weekend at Lime Rock Park.

| Round | Date | Event | Circuit | Location |
|---|---|---|---|---|
| 1 | May 19–22 | Canadian Tire Motorsport Park Grand Prix presented by Audi | Canadian Tire Motorsport Park | Bowmanville, Ontario |
| 2 | August 11–14 | Grand Prix of Utah Motorsports Campus presented by EnergySolutions | Utah Motorsports Campus | Tooele, Utah |
| 3 | October 7–9 | MRLS Grand Prix presented by Nissan | Mazda Raceway Laguna Seca | Monterey, California |

== Entry list ==
=== GT ===
| Constructor | Team | Car | No. | Driver | Class | Rounds |
|---|---|---|---|---|---|---|
| Aston Martin | De La Torre Racing | V12 Vantage GT3 | 4 | (United Kingdom) Lars Viljoen | S | 1 |
| Aston Martin | De La Torre Racing | V12 Vantage GT3 | 4 | (Mexico) Jorge De La Torre | S | 1 |
| Aston Martin | De La Torre Racing | V12 Vantage GT3 | 24 | (Mexico) Jorge De La Torre | S | 3 |
| Aston Martin | De La Torre Racing | V12 Vantage GT3 | 24 | (United Kingdom) Lars Viljoen | S | 3 |
| Audi | Stephen Cameron Racing | R8 LMS ultra | 19 | (Canada) Kyle Marcelli | P | 3 |
| Audi | Stephen Cameron Racing | R8 LMS ultra | 19 | (United States) Drew Regitz | S | 3 |
| Audi | M1 GT Racing | R8 LMS | 23 | (United States) Walt Bowlin | S | 1–2 (Note: Walt Bowlin and Dion von Moltke entered in the same car at Round 2. Bowlin participated in Race 1, while Von Moltke participated in Race 2. David Ostella was the other driver in both races.) |
| Audi | M1 GT Racing | R8 LMS | 23 | (United States) Guy Cosmo | P | 1 |
| Audi | M1 GT Racing | R8 LMS | 23 | (Canada) David Ostella | S | 2–3 |
| Audi | M1 GT Racing | R8 LMS | 23 | (South Africa) Dion von Moltke | P | 2–3 |
| Audi | M1 GT Racing | R8 LMS ultra | 69 | (South Africa) Dion von Moltke | P | 1 |
| Audi | M1 GT Racing | R8 LMS ultra | 69 | (Canada) David Ostella | S | 1 |
| Audi | DXDT Racing | R8 LMS ultra | 63 | (United States) David Askew | S | 2 |
| Audi | DXDT Racing | R8 LMS ultra | 63 | (United States) James Burke | S | 2 |
| BMW | Mills Racing | Z4 GT3 | 46 | (United States) Michael Mills | S | All |
| BMW | Mills Racing | Z4 GT3 | 46 | (Canada) Kuno Wittmer | P | 1–2 |
| BMW | Mills Racing | Z4 GT3 | 46 | (United States) John Edwards | P | 3 |
| Dodge | Lone Star Racing | Viper GT3-R | 80 | (United States) Dan Knox | S | 3 |
| Dodge | Lone Star Racing | Viper GT3-R | 80 | (United States) Mike Skeen | P | 3 |
| Dodge | McCann Racing | Viper GT3-R | 82 | (United States) Jim McCann | S | 3 |
| Dodge | McCann Racing | Viper GT3-R | 82 | (United States) Michael McCann | S | 3 |
| Porsche | Global Motorsports Group | 911 GT3 R | 14 | (United States) Brent Holden | S | All |
| Porsche | Global Motorsports Group | 911 GT3 R | 14 | (United States) Colin Braun | P | 1 |
| Porsche | Global Motorsports Group | 911 GT3 R | 14 | (United States) James Sofronas | S | 2 |
| Porsche | Global Motorsports Group | 911 GT3 R | 14 | (United States) Alec Udell | S | 3 |
| Porsche | Black Swan Racing | 911 GT3 R | 54 | (United States) Tim Pappas | S | 3 |
| Porsche | Black Swan Racing | 911 GT3 R | 54 | (United States) Andy Pilgrim | P | 3 |
| Porsche | Alex Job Racing | 911 GT3 R | 79 | (United States) Gunnar Jeannette | P | 3 |
| Porsche | Alex Job Racing | 911 GT3 R | 79 | (United States) Cooper MacNeil | S | 3 |
| Porsche | Calvert Dynamics | 911 GT3 R | 98 | (United States) Preston Calvert | S | 2–3 |
| Porsche | Calvert Dynamics | 911 GT3 R | 98 | (United States) Michael Lewis | P | 2–3 |
| Porsche | Flying Lizard Motorsports | 911 GT3 R | 451 | (United States) Darren Law | P | 3 |
| Porsche | Flying Lizard Motorsports | 911 GT3 R | 451 | (United States) Andy Wilzoch | S | 3 |

| Icon | Class |
|---|---|
| P | Pro |
| S | Sportsman |

=== GT Cup ===
| Constructor | Team | Car | No. | Driver | Class | Rounds |
|---|---|---|---|---|---|---|
| Lamborghini | DXDT Racing | Huracán LP 620-2 Super Trofeo | 10 | (Brazil) Enrique Bernoldi | P | 3 |
| Lamborghini | DXDT Racing | Huracán LP 620-2 Super Trofeo | 10 | (United States) Jeff Burton | S | 3 |
| Lamborghini | DXDT Racing | Huracán LP 620-2 Super Trofeo | 63 | (United States) David Askew | S | 3 |
| Lamborghini | DXDT Racing | Huracán LP 620-2 Super Trofeo | 63 | (United States) James Burke | S | 3 |
| Porsche | ANSA Motorsports | 911 GT3 Cup | 27 | (Italy) Ludovico Manfredi | S | 3 |
| Porsche | ANSA Motorsports | 911 GT3 Cup | 27 | (United States) Jonathan Summerton | S | 3 |

=== GTS ===
| Constructor | Team | Car | No. | Driver | Class | Rounds |
|---|---|---|---|---|---|---|
| Aston Martin | TRG-AMR | Vantage GT4 | 04 | (United States) Kenton Koch | S | 3 |
| Aston Martin | TRG-AMR | Vantage GT4 | 04 | (United States) George Kurtz | S | 3 |
| Aston Martin | TRG-AMR | Vantage GT4 | 07 | (Canada) Max Riddle | S | All |
| Aston Martin | TRG-AMR | Vantage GT4 | 07 | (United States) Kris Wilson | P | All |
| Aston Martin | TRG-AMR | Vantage GT4 | 7 | (United States) Craig Lyons | S | 3 |
| Aston Martin | TRG-AMR | Vantage GT4 | 7 | (United States) Thomas Merrill | S | 3 |
| Aston Martin | TRG-AMR | Vantage GT4 | 09 | (United States) Jason Alexandridis | S | All |
| Aston Martin | TRG-AMR | Vantage GT4 | 09 | (United States) Derek DeBoer | S | All |
| Aston Martin | TRG-AMR | Vantage GT4 | 77 | (United States) Brandon Davis | P | 3 |
| Aston Martin | TRG-AMR | Vantage GT4 | 77 | (United States) Greg Milzcik | S | 3 |
| Aston Martin | Stephen Cameron Racing | Vantage GT4 | 5 | (United States) Ari Balogh | S | 3 |
| Aston Martin | Stephen Cameron Racing | Vantage GT4 | 5 | (United States) Greg Liefooghe | S | 3 |
| Ford | Calvert Dynamics | Mustang Boss 302 | 37 | (United States) Andrew Aquilante | S | 3 |
| Ford | Calvert Dynamics | Mustang Boss 302 | 37 | (United States) Kurt Rezzetano | S | 3 |
| Ginetta | Performance Motorsports Group | G55 GT4 | 29 | (United States) Parker Chase | S | 2–3 |
| Ginetta | Performance Motorsports Group | G55 GT4 | 29 | (United States) Harry Gottsacker | S | 2–3 |
| KTM | ANSA Motorsports | X-Bow GT4 | 12 | (United States) Brett Sandberg | S | 3 |
| KTM | ANSA Motorsports | X-Bow GT4 | 12 | (United States) Jason Wolfe | S | 3 |
| Maserati | JCR Motorsports | GranTurismo MC | 66 | (United States) Jeff Courtney | S | 3 |
| Maserati | JCR Motorsports | GranTurismo MC | 66 | (United States) Greg Palmer | S | 3 |
| Porsche | Global Motorsports Group | Cayman GT4 Clubsport | 4 | (New Zealand) Matt Halliday | P | 3 |
| Porsche | Global Motorsports Group | Cayman GT4 Clubsport | 4 | (United States) James Sofronas | S | 3 |
| SIN | Racers Edge Motorsports | R1 GT4 | 45 | (United States) Chris Beaufait | S | 1, 3 |
| SIN | Racers Edge Motorsports | R1 GT4 | 45 | (Canada) James Vance | S | 1 |
| SIN | Racers Edge Motorsports | R1 GT4 | 45 | (United States) Scott Heckert | S | 3 |
| SIN | Racers Edge Motorsports | R1 GT4 | 54 | (United States) Chris Beaufait | S | 2 |
| SIN | Racers Edge Motorsports | R1 GT4 | 54 | (United States) Scott Heckert | S | 2 |

== Race results ==
| Round | | Circuit | GT Winning Car | GT Cup Winning Car | GTS Winning Car |
| Round | | Circuit | GT Winning Drivers | GT Cup Winning Drivers | GTS Winning Drivers |
|---|---|---|---|---|---|
| 1 | R1 | Mosport | #46 BMW Z4 GT3 | No entries | #07 Aston Martin Vantage GT4 |
| 1 | R1 | Mosport | (United States) Michael Mills (Canada) Kuno Wittmer | No entries | (Canada) Max Riddle (United States) Kris Wilson |
| 1 | R2 | Mosport | #46 BMW Z4 GT3 | No entries | #07 Aston Martin Vantage GT4 |
| 1 | R2 | Mosport | (United States) Michael Mills (Canada) Kuno Wittmer | No entries | (Canada) Max Riddle (United States) Kris Wilson |
| 2 | R1 | Utah | #98 Porsche 911 GT3 R | No entries | #09 Aston Martin Vantage GT4 |
| 2 | R1 | Utah | (United States) Preston Calvert (United States) Michael Lewis | No entries | (United States) Jason Alexandridis (United States) Derek DeBoer |
| 2 | R2 | Utah | #98 Porsche 911 GT3 R | No entries | #07 Aston Martin Vantage GT4 |
| 2 | R2 | Utah | (United States) Preston Calvert (United States) Michael Lewis | No entries | (Canada) Max Riddle (United States) Kris Wilson |
| 3 | R1 | Laguna Seca | #19 Audi R8 LMS ultra | #63 Lamborghini Huracán LP 620-2 Super Trofeo | #37 Ford Mustang Boss 302 |
| 3 | R1 | Laguna Seca | (Canada) Kyle Marcelli (United States) Drew Regitz | (United States) David Askew (United States) James Burke | (United States) Andrew Aquilante (United States) Kurt Rezzetano |
| 3 | R2 | Laguna Seca | #46 BMW Z4 GT3 | #10 Lamborghini Huracán LP 620-2 Super Trofeo | #37 Ford Mustang Boss 302 |
| 3 | R2 | Laguna Seca | (United States) John Edwards (United States) Michael Mills | (Brazil) Enrique Bernoldi (United States) Jeff Burton | (United States) Andrew Aquilante (United States) Kurt Rezzetano |

== Championship standings ==
=== Drivers' championships ===
Points were awarded based on finishing positions as shown in the chart below. Points were awarded to the driver behind the wheel at the 25-minute mark (when Pit Lane opens for mandatory tire and driver changes) and to the driver behind the wheel at the finish.

| Position | 1 | 2 | 3 | 4 | 5 | 6 | 7 | 8 | 9 | 10 | 11 | 12 | 13 | 14 | 15 | 16 | 17 | 18 | 19 | 20 | 21 | 22 | 23 | 24 | 25 | 26 | 27 | 28 | 29 | 30 | 31 | 32 | 33 | 34 | 35 | 36 | 37 | 38 | 39 | 40 |
|---|---|---|---|---|---|---|---|---|---|---|---|---|---|---|---|---|---|---|---|---|---|---|---|---|---|---|---|---|---|---|---|---|---|---|---|---|---|---|---|---|
| Race | 110 | 98 | 90 | 84 | 80 | 76 | 72 | 68 | 64 | 60 | 57 | 54 | 51 | 48 | 45 | 43 | 41 | 39 | 37 | 35 | 33 | 31 | 29 | 27 | 25 | 23 | 21 | 19 | 17 | 15 | 13 | 11 | 9 | 7 | 6 | 5 | 4 | 3 | 2 | 1 |

==== GT ====
| Pos. | Driver | Car | MOS | | MOS | | UTA | | UTA | | LAG | | LAG | | Points |
| Pos. | Driver | Car | 25m | 60m | 25m | 60m | 25m | 60m | 25m | 60m | 25m | 60m | 25m | 60m | Points |
Pro
| 1 | (South Africa) Dion von Moltke | Audi R8 LMS ultra | 1 | | | 3 | | | | | | | | | 438 |
| 1 | (South Africa) Dion von Moltke | Audi R8 LMS | | | | | | | | 2 | | 8 | 7 | | 438 |
| 2 | (Canada) Kuno Wittmer | BMW Z4 GT3 | | 1 | 4 | | | 2 | 2 | | | | | | 390 |
| 3 | (United States) Michael Lewis | Porsche 911 GT3 R | | | | | | 1 | **1** | | | 5 | **8** | | 368 |
| 4 | (United States) Colin Braun | Porsche 911 GT3 R | | 3 | **1** | | | | | | | | | | 200 |
| 5 | (United States) Guy Cosmo | Audi R8 LMS | | 4 | 2 | | | | | | | | | | 182 |
| 6 | (United States) John Edwards | BMW Z4 GT3 | | | | | | | | | | 4 | 2 | | 182 |
| 7 | (United States) Gunnar Jeannette | Porsche 911 GT3 R | | | | | | | | | | 3 | 3 | | 180 |
| 8 | (United States) Andy Pilgrim | Porsche 911 GT3 R | | | | | | | | | | 7 | 4 | | 156 |
| 9 | (United States) Darren Law | Porsche 911 GT3 R | | | | | | | | | | 9 | 5 | | 144 |
| 10 | (Canada) Kyle Marcelli | Audi R8 LMS ultra | | | | | | | | | | 1 | DNS | | 110 |
| 11 | (United States) Mike Skeen | Dodge Viper GT3-R | | | | | | | | | | 2 | DNS | | 98 |
Sportsman
| 1 | (United States) Michael Mills | BMW Z4 GT3 | 2 | | | 1 | 2 | | | 3 | 4 | | | 1 | 590 |
| 2 | (Canada) David Ostella | Audi R8 LMS ultra | | 2 | 3 | | | | | | | | | | 550 |
| 2 | (Canada) David Ostella | Audi R8 LMS | | | | | | 4 | 3 | | **2** | | | 3 | 550 |
| 3 | (United States) Brent Holden | Porsche 911 GT3 R | 3 | | | 2 | 4 | | | 4 | 8 | | | 6 | 500 |
| 4 | (United States) Preston Calvert | Porsche 911 GT3 R | | | | | 3 | | | 1 | 7 | | | 8 | 340 |
| 5 | (Mexico) Jorge De La Torre | Aston Martin V12 Vantage GT3 | | 5 | 5 | | | | | | 10 | | | 5 | 300 |
| 6 | (United Kingdom) Lars Viljoen | Aston Martin V12 Vantage GT3 | **5** | | | 5 | | | | | | 10 | 6 | | 296 |
| 7 | (United States) Walt Bowlin | Audi R8 LMS | 4 | | | 4 | 5 | | | | | | | | 248 |
| 8 | (United States) James Burke | Audi R8 LMS ultra | | | | | **1** | | | 5 | | | | | 190 |
| 9 | (United States) Tim Pappas | Porsche 911 GT3 R | | | | | | | | | 3 | | | 2 | 188 |
| 10 | (United States) Alec Udell | Porsche 911 GT3 R | | | | | | | | | | 6 | 1 | | 186 |
| 11 | (United States) Cooper MacNeil | Porsche 911 GT3 R | | | | | | | | | 1 | | | 7 | 182 |
| 12 | (United States) James Sofronas | Porsche 911 GT3 R | | | | | | 3 | 4 | | | | | | 174 |
| 13 | (United States) David Askew | Audi R8 LMS ultra | | | | | | 5 | 5 | | | | | | 160 |
| 14 | (United States) Andy Wilzoch | Porsche 911 GT3 R | | | | | | | | | 9 | | | 4 | 148 |
| 15 | (United States) Dan Knox | Dodge Viper GT3-R | | | | | | | | | 5 | | | DNS | 80 |
| 16 | (United States) Drew Regitz | Audi R8 LMS ultra | | | | | | | | | 6 | | | DNS | 76 |
| | (United States) Jim McCann | Dodge Viper GT3-R | | | | | | | | | Wth | | | Wth | 0 |
| | (United States) Michael McCann | Dodge Viper GT3-R | | | | | | | | | | Wth | Wth | | 0 |
| Pos. | Driver | Car | 25m | 60m | 25m | 60m | 25m | 60m | 25m | 60m | 25m | 60m | 25m | 60m | Points |
| Pos. | Driver | Car | MOS | | MOS | | UTA | | UTA | | LAG | | LAG | | Points |

| Color | Result |
|---|---|
| Gold | Winner |
| Silver | 2nd place |
| Bronze | 3rd place |
| Green | 4th & 5th place |
| Light Blue | 6th–10th place |
| Dark Blue | Finished (Outside Top 10) |
| Purple | Did not finish |
| Red | Did not qualify (DNQ) |
| Brown | Withdrawn (Wth) |
| Black | Disqualified; Excluded (DSQ/EX) |
| White | Did not start (DNS) |
| Light Cyan | Practice only (PO) |
| Blank | Did not participate |

**Bold** – Pole position
Italics – Fastest Lap

==== GT Cup ====
| Pos. | Driver | Car | MOS | | MOS | | UTA | | UTA | | LAG | | LAG | | Points |
| Pos. | Driver | Car | 25m | 60m | 25m | 60m | 25m | 60m | 25m | 60m | 25m | 60m | 25m | 60m | Points |
Pro
| 1 | (Brazil) Enrique Bernoldi | Lamborghini Huracán LP 620-2 Super Trofeo | | | | | | | | | | 2 | **1** | | 208 |
Sportsman
| 1 | (United States) Jeff Burton | Lamborghini Huracán LP 620-2 Super Trofeo | | | | | | | | | 2 | | | 1 | 208 |
| 2 | (United States) David Askew | Lamborghini Huracán LP 620-2 Super Trofeo | | | | | | | | | **1** | | | 2 | 208 |
| 3 | (United States) James Burke | Lamborghini Huracán LP 620-2 Super Trofeo | | | | | | | | | | 1 | 2 | | 208 |
| 4 | (Italy) Ludovico Manfredi | Porsche 911 GT3 Cup | | | | | | | | | 3 | | | 3 | 180 |
| 5 | (United States) Jonathan Summerton | Porsche 911 GT3 Cup | | | | | | | | | | 3 | 3 | | 180 |
| Pos. | Driver | Car | 25m | 60m | 25m | 60m | 25m | 60m | 25m | 60m | 25m | 60m | 25m | 60m | Points |
| Pos. | Driver | Car | MOS | | MOS | | UTA | | UTA | | LAG | | LAG | | Points |

==== GTS ====
| Pos. | Driver | Car | MOS | | MOS | | UTA | | UTA | | LAG | | LAG | | Points |
| Pos. | Driver | Car | 25m | 60m | 25m | 60m | 25m | 60m | 25m | 60m | 25m | 60m | 25m | 60m | Points |
Pro
| 1 | (United States) Kris Wilson | Aston Martin Vantage GT4 | | 1 | **1** | | | 3 | 3 | | | 2 | 1 | | 608 |
| 2 | (United States) Brandon Davis | Aston Martin Vantage GT4 | | | | | | | | | | 5 | 2 | | 178 |
| 3 | (New Zealand) Matt Halliday | Porsche Cayman GT4 Clubsport | | | | | | | | | | 3 | DNS | | 90 |
Sportsman
| 1 | (Canada) Max Riddle | Aston Martin Vantage GT4 | **1** | | | 1 | 1 | | | 1 | 4 | | | 2 | 622 |
| 2 | (United States) Derek DeBoer | Aston Martin Vantage GT4 | 2 | | | 2 | | 1 | 1 | | 2 | | | 6 | 590 |
| 3 | (United States) Jason Alexandridis | Aston Martin Vantage GT4 | | 2 | 2 | | 2 | | | 2 | | 4 | 8 | | 544 |
| 4 | (United States) Chris Beaufait | SIN R1 GT4 | | 3 | 3 | | **3** | | | 4 | DNS | | | 9 | 418 |
| 5 | (United States) Scott Heckert | SIN R1 GT4 | | | | | | 2 | **4** | | | DNS | 9 | | 246 |
| 6 | (United States) Kurt Rezzetano | Ford Mustang Boss 302 | | | | | | | | | **1** | | | 1 | 220 |
| 7 | (United States) Parker Chase | Ginetta G55 GT4 | | | | | | DNS | 2 | | | 10 | 10 | | 218 |
| 8 | (United States) Harry Gottsacker | Ginetta G55 GT4 | | | | | DNS | | | 3 | 10 | | | 10 | 210 |
| 9 | (United States) Andrew Aquilante | Ford Mustang Boss 302 | | | | | | | | | | 1 | **5** | | 190 |
| 10 | (Canada) James Vance | SIN R1 GT4 | 3 | | | 3 | | | | | | | | | 180 |
| 11 | (United States) Ari Balogh | Aston Martin Vantage GT4 | | | | | | | | | 8 | | | 3 | 158 |
| 12 | (United States) Greg Liefooghe | Aston Martin Vantage GT4 | | | | | | | | | | 8 | 3 | | 158 |
| 13 | (United States) Thomas Merrill | Aston Martin Vantage GT4 | | | | | | | | | | 7 | 4 | | 156 |
| 14 | (United States) Craig Lyons | Aston Martin Vantage GT4 | | | | | | | | | 5 | | | 7 | 152 |
| 15 | (United States) Greg Milzcik | Aston Martin Vantage GT4 | | | | | | | | | 7 | | | 5 | 152 |
| 16 | (United States) Jeff Courtney | Maserati GranTurismo MC | | | | | | | | | | 6 | 7 | | 148 |
| 17 | (United States) Greg Palmer | Maserati GranTurismo MC | | | | | | | | | 6 | | | 8 | 144 |
| 18 | (United States) Jason Wolfe | KTM X-Bow GT4 | | | | | | | | | 11 | | | 4 | 141 |
| 19 | (United States) Brett Sandberg | KTM X-Bow GT4 | | | | | | | | | | 11 | 6 | | 133 |
| 20 | (United States) George Kurtz | Aston Martin Vantage GT4 | | | | | | | | | 9 | | | 11 | 121 |
| 21 | (United States) Kenton Koch | Aston Martin Vantage GT4 | | | | | | | | | | 9 | 11 | | 121 |
| 22 | (United States) James Sofronas | Porsche Cayman GT4 Clubsport | | | | | | | | | 3 | | | DNS | 90 |
| Pos. | Driver | Car | 25m | 60m | 25m | 60m | 25m | 60m | 25m | 60m | 25m | 60m | 25m | 60m | Points |
| Pos. | Driver | Car | MOS | | MOS | | UTA | | UTA | | LAG | | LAG | | Points |
