= SIN R1 =

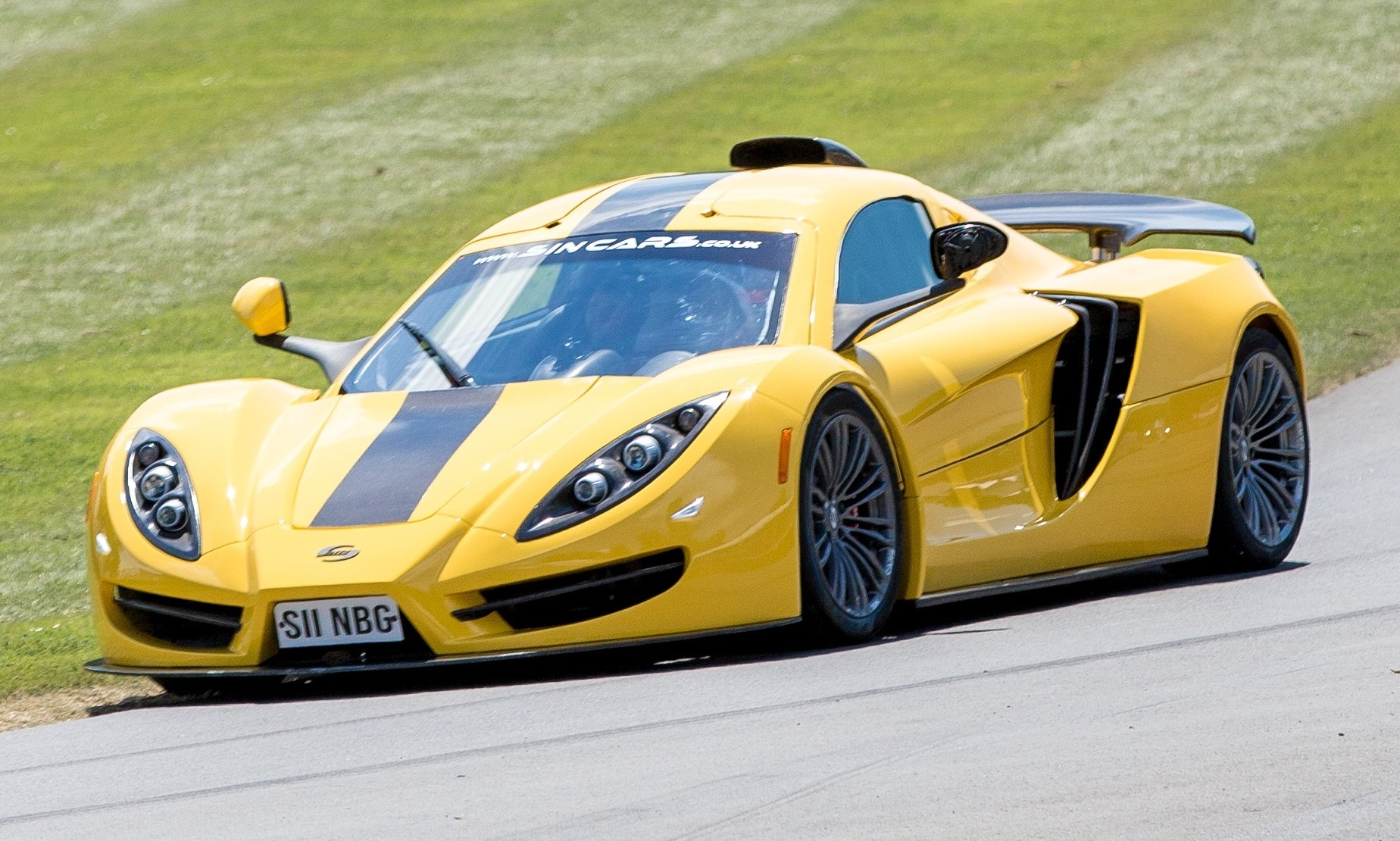
- SIN R1 at the 2014 Goodwood Festival of Speed

Overview
- Manufacturer: SIN Cars
- Production: 2015–present
- Designer: Rosen Daskalov

Body and chassis
- Class: Sports car (S)
- Layout: Rear mid-engine, rear-wheel-drive
- Doors: Butterfly doors

Powertrain
- Engine: 6.2 L (6,162 cc) LS3 V8 (R1 450); 7.0 L (7,011 cc) LS7 V8 (R1 550); 6.2 L (6,162 cc) LS9 supercharged V8 (R1 650)
- Power output: 450–650 hp (336–485 kW; 456–659 PS)
- Transmission: 6-speed manual

Dimensions
- Wheelbase: 2,760 mm (108.7 in)
- Length: 4,830 mm (190.2 in)
- Width: 2,000 mm (78.7 in)
- Height: 1,285 mm (50.6 in)
- Curb weight: 1,250 kg (2,760 lb)

The SIN R1 is a sports car made by Bulgarian manufacturer SIN Cars.

== Background ==
Rosen Daskalov, the founder of SIN Cars & former racing driver, was working with a British business partner in the United Kingdom in 2012. After disagreements they split and Daskalov moved the company to his hometown and continued developing the R1.

== Specifications ==
The R1 features an FIA-certified tube frame construction, being built around a strong, heavy and relatively easy-to-make tubular spaceframe chassis rather than a carbon fiber monocoque. It features carbon fiber bodywork and an active rear spoiler. It came with 3 engine choices – LS3 (6.2-liter N/A V8) for the 450, LS7 (7.0-liter N/A V8) for the 550, and an LS9 (6.2-liter supercharged V8) for the 650. The standard transmission was a 6-speed manual, with a sequential paddleshift gearbox offered on some models, sending power to a limited-slip differential. The brakes are supplied by AP Racing and the dampers by Öhlins. It has double wishbone suspension all around with in-board mounted springs and dampers. The car weighs 1,250 kg (2,760 lb) and has a top speed of 300 km/h (186 mph). The 7.0-liter naturally aspirated engine has its pistons and bearings replaced with high-performance items. A dry sump lubrication system is better fitted for track driving, which means the engine can be positioned lower in the chassis – and it uses a bespoke, part-titanium exhaust.

The R1 series includes 3 models (450, 550 & 650) for road and 2 models (VTX & GT4) for track. The first R1 was revealed in track-only prototype form in 2013 at the Autosport International show. In 2014, a road-going prototype was shown. The R1 will be produced no more than 20 units annually.

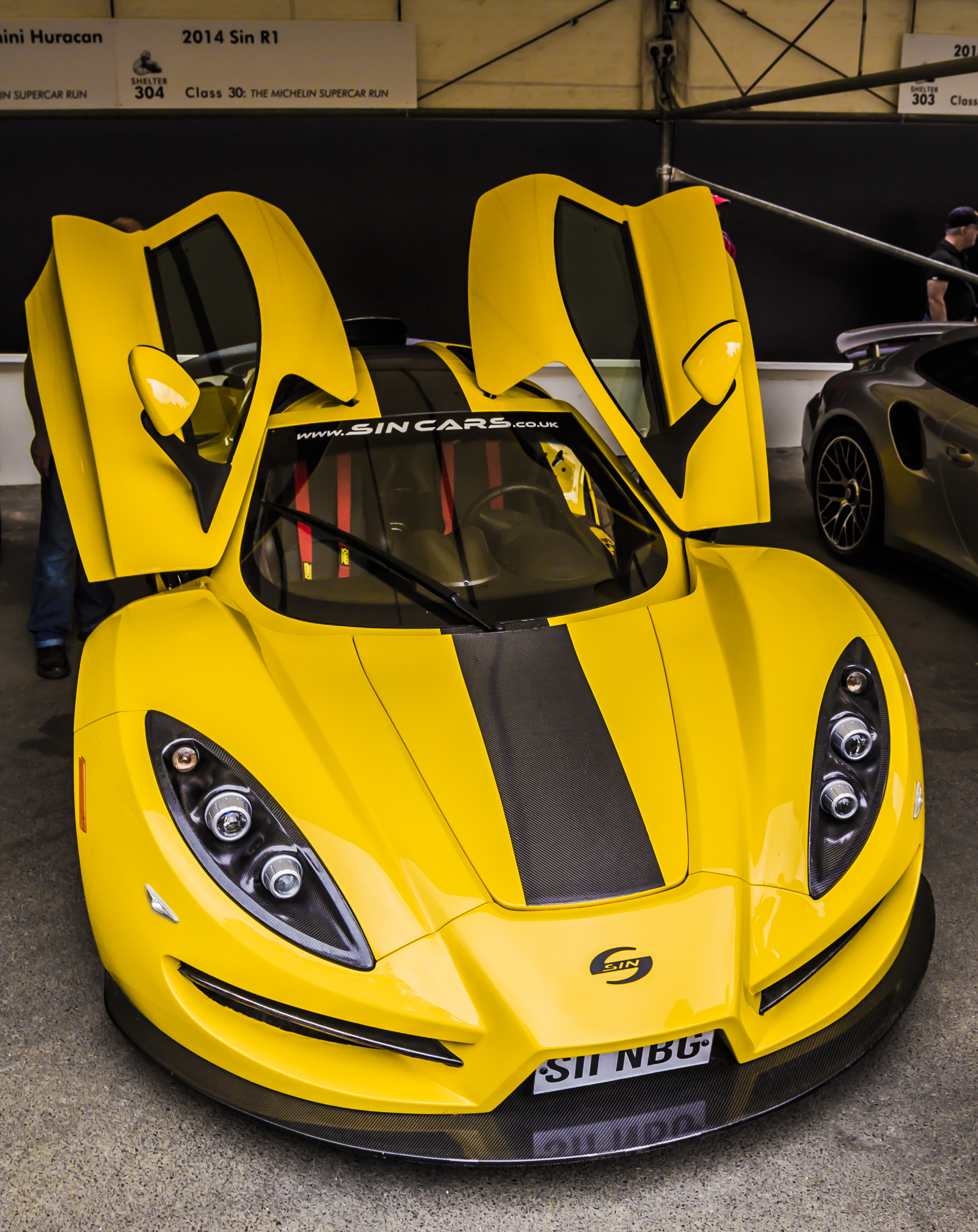
Sin R1 at the 2014 Goodwood Festival of Speed

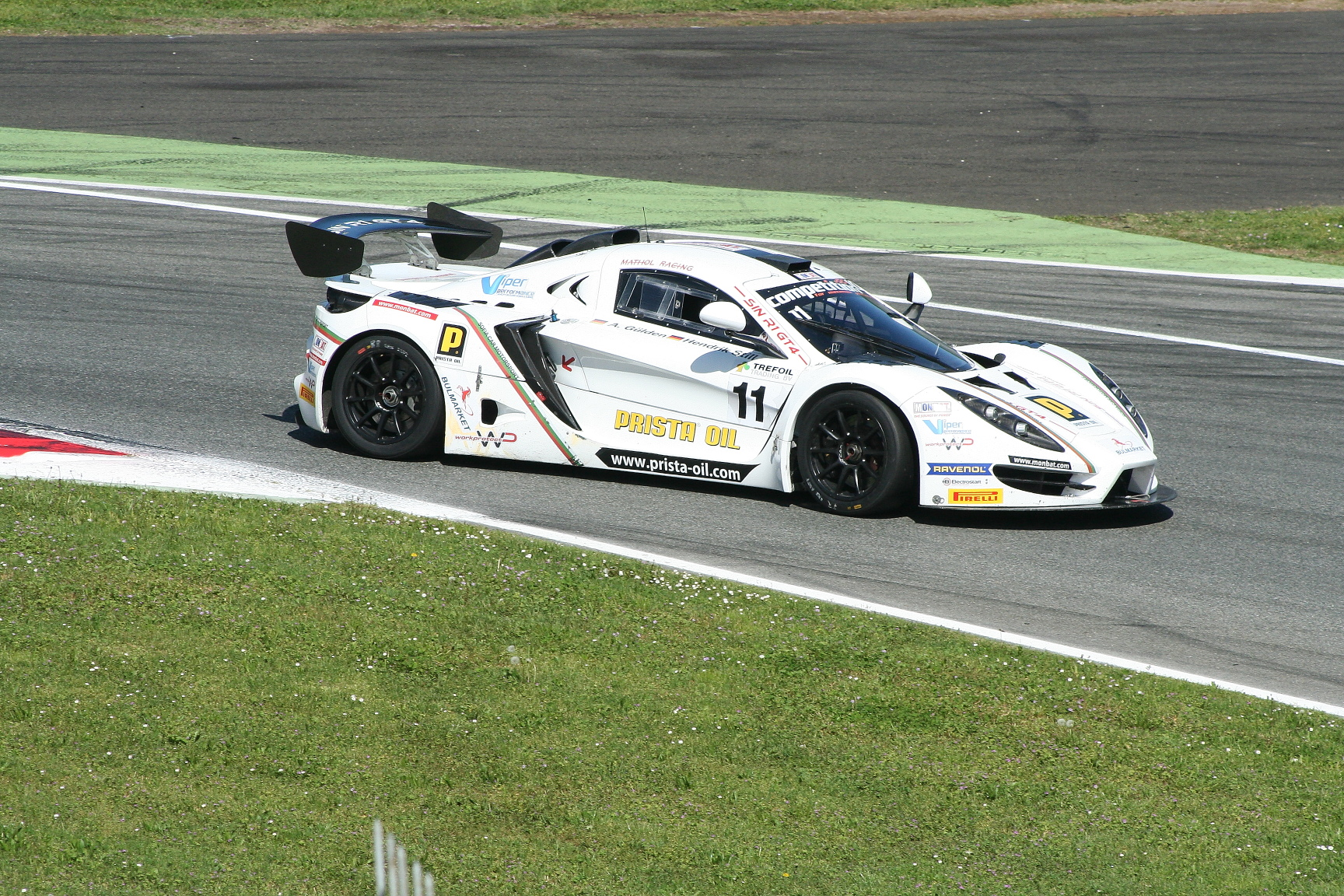
SIN R1 at R2 of the 2016 Competition102 GT4 European Series at Monza

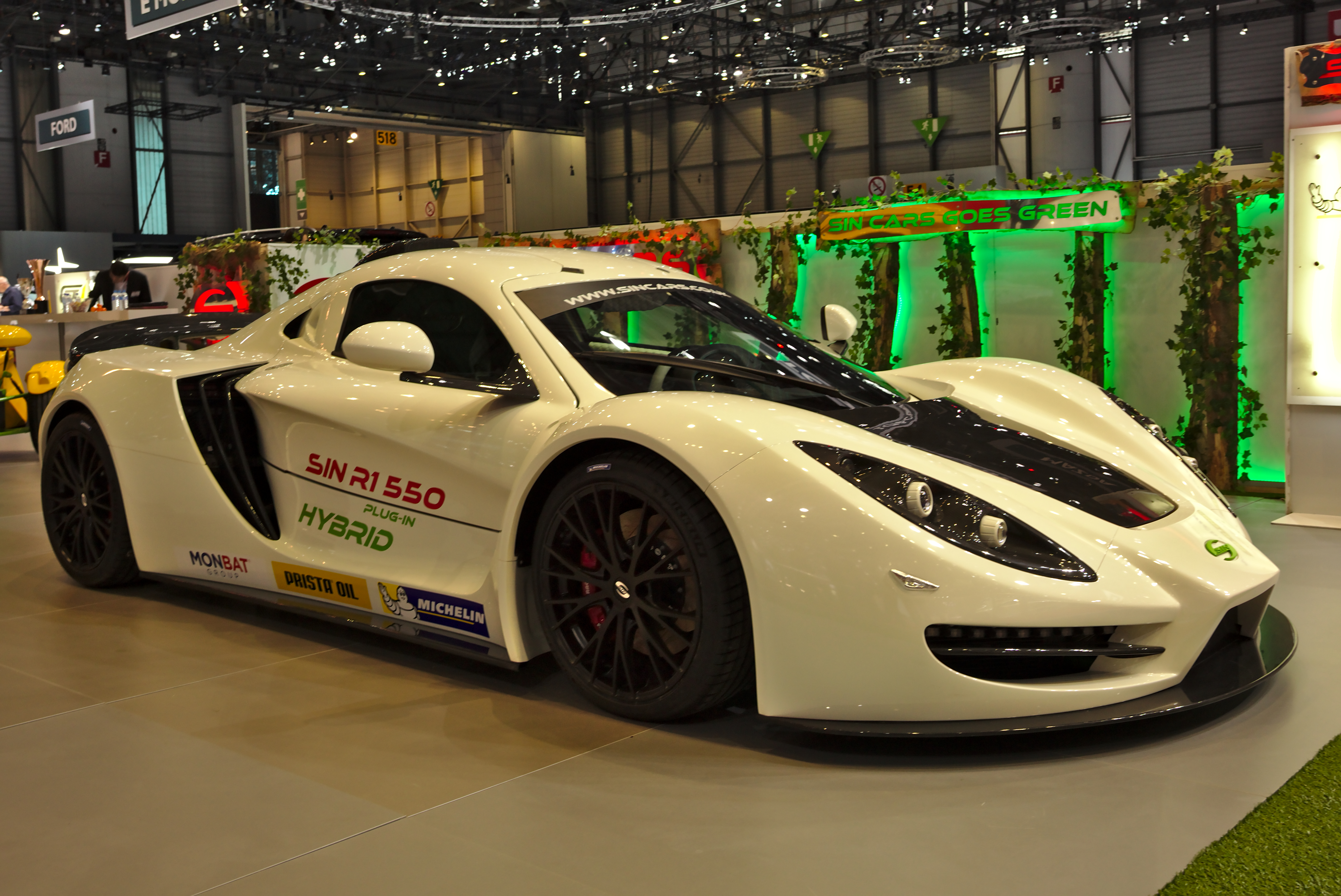
Sin R1 550 Hybrid at the 2018 Geneva Motor Show

== Specifications ==
Engine	Displacement	Bore × stroke	Compression	Induction	Power at RPM	Torque	0–100 km/h (62 mph)
LS3	6,162 cc (6.162 L; 376.0 cu in)	4.065 in × 3.622 in (103.3 mm × 92.0 mm)	10.7:1	N/A	450 PS (331 kW; 444 bhp) at 5900	585 N⋅m (431 lb⋅ft)	3.9 sec
LS7	7,011 cc (7.011 L; 427.8 cu in)	4.125 in × 4.000 in (104.8 mm × 101.6 mm)	11.0:1	N/A	550 PS (405 kW; 542 bhp) at 6300	640 N⋅m (472 lb⋅ft)	3.5 sec
LS9	6,162 cc (6.162 L; 376.0 cu in)	4.065 in × 3.622 in (103.3 mm × 92.0 mm)	9.1:1	Supercharged	650 PS (478 kW; 641 bhp) at 6300	820 N⋅m (605 lb⋅ft)	3.0 sec
