= Ari Balogh =

American businessman and racing driver (born 1964)

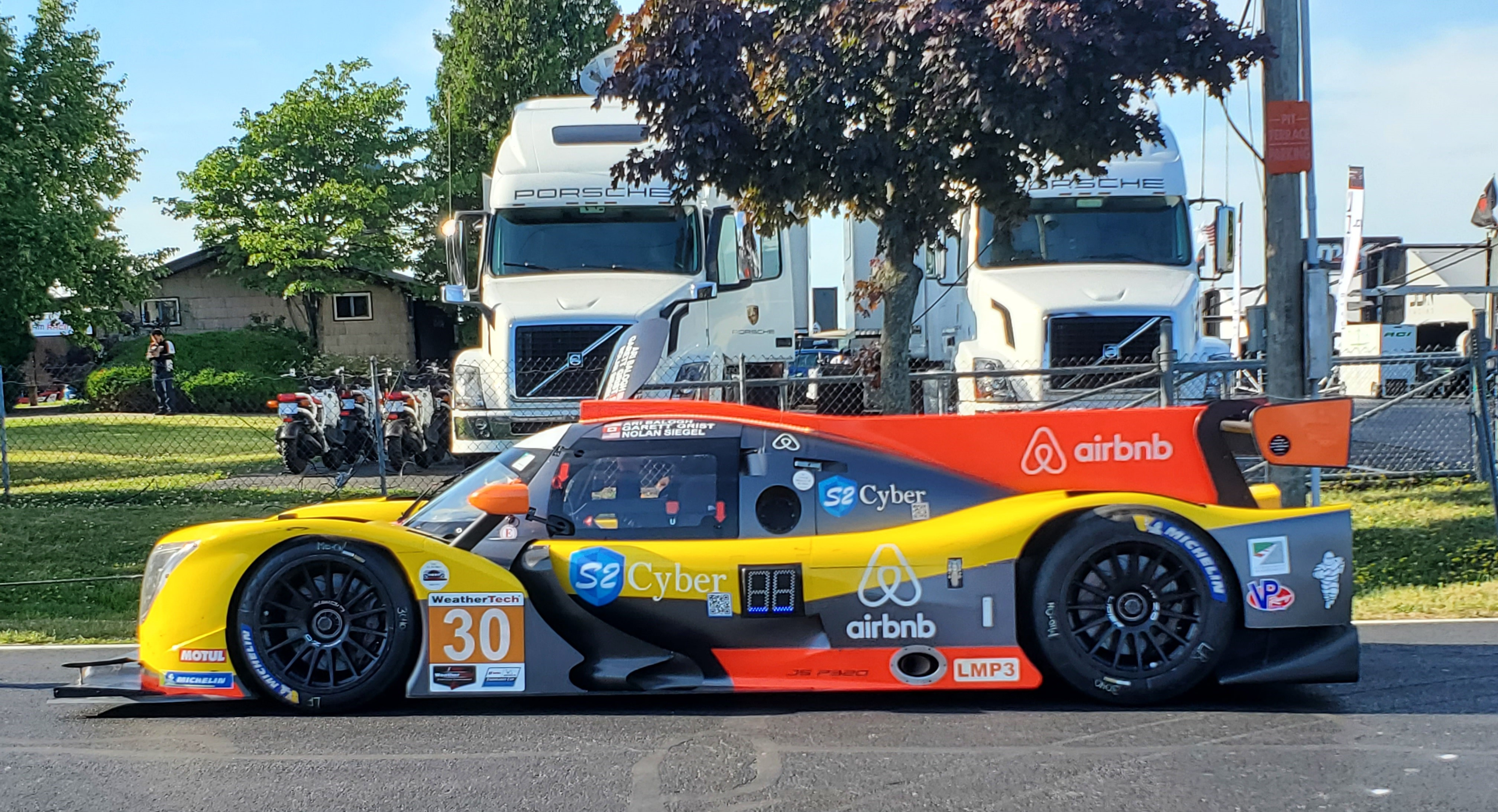
- Balogh in 2022
- Nationality: (United States) American
- Born: March 29, 1964 (age 62) Menlo Park, California, U.S.
- Categorisation: FIA Bronze

Championship titles
- 2026 2017: Airbnb Endurance Challenge – LMP3; SprintX GT Championship Series – GTS Am-Am

Aristotle N. Balogh (born March 29, 1964) is an American businessman, technology executive and racing driver who last competed in the LMP3 class of the IMSA VP Racing SportsCar Challenge for Toney Driver Development. He has held executive roles at Yahoo, Google and Airbnb.

== Business ventures ==
In 1999, Balogh joined Verisign as the company's vice president of engineering, before being promoted to senior vice president for operations three years later. Balogh then left the company to join Yahoo in 2008 as its CTO, but ultimately stepped down from his positions just two years later. In 2011, Balogh was set to join StumbleUpon as the vice president of engineering, but never spent a day at the company, as he moved to Google as its vice president of engineering. Seven years later, Balogh left Google to work at Airbnb's CTO, a position he held until late 2025.

== Career ==
Balogh made his car racing debut in 2016, competing in the Street Tuner class of the Continental Tire SportsCar Challenge for Porsche-fielding Next Level European. Racing alongside Greg Liefooghe in his rookie season, Balogh scored a lone podium at VIR en route to a 14th-place points finish. Moving to BMW-aligned BimmerWorld Racing for 2017, Balogh and Liefooghe took a best result of fifth at the same venue to end the season 14th in points. In parallel, the pair competed for Stephen Cameron Racing in the GTS Am-Am class of the SprintX GT Championship Series, taking five wins and finishing on the podium in all ten races to clinch the title, as the team switched from an Aston Martin to a BMW mid-season.

Moving up to CTSCC's Grand Sport class for 2018 with Stephen Cameron Racing and jumping Mercedes-AMG and BMW machinery, Balogh scored a best result of fourth at Sebring to take 11th in points. In 2019, he raced on a part-time basis in the newly-rebranded Michelin Pilot Challenge for a cast of teams, most notably taking an overall podium at VIR. After a one-off appearance in the series in 2020 for Stephen Cameron Racing, Balogh joined Jr III Racing to compete in the IMSA Prototype Challenge in 2021, partnering first his daughter Natasha and later LMP3 professional Garett Grist. Towards the end of the year, Balogh remained with the team to make his IMSA SportsCar Championship debut at Petit Le Mans, finishing second in LMP3 with Grist and Spencer Pigot.

In 2022, Balogh remained with JR III Racing for a dual campaign in the IMSA Prototype Challenge and the LMP3 class of the IMSA SportsCar Championship. Between the two campaigns, Balogh took a best result of second three times in the latter, as he and Grist ended the season third in points. Continuing with the team for most of the season in 2023, Balogh equalled his best result of second at Mosport, before switching to Tower Motorsports to make his LMP2 debut at the season-ending Petit Le Mans alongside IndyCar duo Kyffin Simpson and Scott McLaughlin. After not racing in 2024, Balogh reunited with Garett Grist to enter the first two rounds of the 2025 Le Mans Cup for Inter Europol Competition in LMP3 Pro-Am, before joining Toney Driver Development to compete in the endurance rounds of the IMSA VP Racing SportsCar Challenge in 2026. Competing on a part-time basis in the series, Balogh won at VIR and took two other podiums to clinch the series' inaugural Endurance Challenge title.

== Racing record ==
=== Racing career summary ===
Season	Series	Team	Races	Wins	Poles	F/Laps	Podiums	Points	Position
2016	Continental Tire SportsCar Challenge – ST	Next Level European	10	0	0	0	1	157	14th
2016	SprintX GT Championship Series – GTS	Stephen Cameron Racing	2	0	0	0	1	158	11th
2016	Pirelli World Challenge – TC	Stephen Cameron Racing	2	0	0	0	0	76	30th
2016	Pirelli World Challenge – GTS	Stephen Cameron Racing	1	0	0	0	0	68	36th
2016	Trans-Am – TA3	Stephen Cameron Racing	1	0	0	0	0	18	21st
2017	Continental Tire SportsCar Challenge – ST	BimmerWorld Racing	9	0	0	0	0	199	14th
2017	SprintX GT Championship Series – GTS Am-Am	Stephen Cameron Racing	10	5	1	2	10	236	**1st**
2017	Pirelli World Challenge – TC	Stephen Cameron Racing	12	0	0	0	0	118	9th
2017	Pirelli World Challenge – GTSA	Stephen Cameron Racing	5	2	0	1	3	83	12th
2018	Continental Tire SportsCar Challenge – GS	Stephen Cameron Racing	10	0	0	0	0	199	11th
2019	GT4 America Series – Sprint Am	Stephen Cameron Racing	2	0	0	0	0	24	18th
2019	GT4 America Series – SprintX Pro-Am	Stephen Cameron Racing	2	0	0	0	1	28	10th
2019	Michelin Pilot Challenge – GS	Automatic Racing AMR	2	0	0	0	0	112	24th
2019	Michelin Pilot Challenge – GS	BimmerWorld Racing	2	0	0	0	1	112	24th
2019	Michelin Pilot Challenge – GS	KohR Motorsports	1	0	0	0	0	112	24th
2019	Michelin Pilot Challenge – GS	Stephen Cameron Racing	1	0	0	0	0	112	24th
2020	Michelin Pilot Challenge – GS	Stephen Cameron Racing	1	0	0	0	0	24	52nd
2021	IMSA Prototype Challenge – LMP3–1	Jr III Racing	5	0	0	0	1	1180	9th
2021	Masters Endurance Legends USA – Proto 2		1	0	0	0	1	4	15th
2021	IMSA SportsCar Championship – LMP3	Jr III Motorsports	1	0	0	0	1	343	19th
2022	IMSA Prototype Challenge	Jr III Racing	4	0	0	0	1	1250	4th
2022	IMSA SportsCar Championship – LMP3	Jr III Motorsports	6	0	0	0	4	1942	**3rd**
2023	IMSA SportsCar Championship – LMP3	Jr III Motorsports	3	0	0	0	1	913	12th
2023	IMSA SportsCar Championship – LMP2	Tower Motorsports	1	0	0	0	0	264	27th
2025	Le Mans Cup – LMP3 Pro-Am	Inter Europol Competition	2	0	0	0	0	1	30th
2026	IMSA VP Racing SportsCar Challenge – LMP3	Toney Driver Development	6	1	0	0	3	1690	8th

* Season still in progress.

=== Complete Michelin Pilot Challenge results ===
(key) (Races in bold indicate pole position) (Races in italics indicate fastest lap)

Year	Entrant	Class	Make	1	2	3	4	5	6	7	8	9	10	Rank	Points
2016	Next Level European	Street Tuner	Porsche Cayman	DAY; 4	SEB; 8	LGA; 17	WGL; 25	MOS; 26	LIM; 24	ELK; 14	VIR; 2	COA; 22	ATL; 16	14th	157
2017	BimmerWorld Racing	Street Tuner	BMW 328i (F30)	DAY; 7	SEB; 15	COA; 6	WGL; 7	MOS	LIM; 6	ELK; 11	VIR; 5	LGA; 6	ATL; 14	14th	199
2018	Stephen Cameron Racing	Grand Sport	Mercedes-AMG GT4	DAY; 15	SEB; 4									11th	199
2018	Stephen Cameron Racing	Grand Sport	BMW M4 GT4			MOH; 8	WGL; 6	MOS; 9	LIM; 20	ELK; 10	VIR; 7	LGA; 16	ATL; 6	11th	199
2019	Automatic Racing AMR	Grand Sport	Aston Martin AMR Vantage GT4	DAY	SEB	MOH	WGL	MOS; 10	LIM; 15					24th	112
2019	BimmerWorld Racing	Grand Sport	BMW M4 GT4							ELK; 20	VIR; 3			24th	112
2019	KohR Motorsports	Grand Sport	Ford Mustang GT4									LGA; 12		24th	112
2019	Stephen Cameron Racing	Grand Sport	BMW M4 GT4										ATL; 16	24th	112
2020	Stephen Cameron Racing	Grand Sport	Aston Martin AMR Vantage GT4	DAY; 7	SEB	ELK	VIR	ATL	MOH; 1	MOH; 2	ATL	LAG	SEB	52nd	24

=== Complete IMSA SportsCar Championship results ===
(key) (Races in bold indicate pole position; results in italics indicate fastest lap)

Year	Team	Class	Make	Engine	1	2	3	4	5	6	7	Pos.	Points
2021	Jr III Motorsports	LMP3	Ligier JS P320	Nissan VK56DE 5.6 L V8	DAY	SEB	MOH	WGL	WGL	ELK	PET; 2	19th	343
2022	Jr III Motorsports	LMP3	Ligier JS P320	Nissan VK56DE 5.6 L V8	DAY	SEB; 2	MOH; 2	WGL; 6	MOS; 3	ELK; 4	PET; 2	3rd	1942
2023	Jr III Motorsports	LMP3	Ligier JS P320	Nissan VK56DE 5.6 L V8	DAY	SEB; 8	WGL; WD	MOS; 2	ELK; 4	IMS		12th	913
2023	Tower Motorsports	LMP2	Oreca 07	Gibson GK428 V8							PET; 7	27th	264

=== Complete Le Mans Cup results ===
(key) (Races in bold indicate pole position; results in italics indicate fastest lap)

Year	Entrant	Class	Chassis	1	2	3	4	5	6	7	Rank	Points
2025	Inter Europol Competition	LMP3 Pro-Am	Ligier JS P325	BAR; 11	LEC; 10	LMS; 1	LMS; 2	SPA	SIL	POR	30th	1

=== Complete IMSA VP Racing SportsCar Challenge results ===
(key) (Races in bold indicate pole position; results in italics indicate fastest lap)

Year	Entrant	Class	Chassis	1	2	3	4	5	6	7	8	9	10	11	12	13	14	Rank	Points
2026	Toney Driver Development	LMP3	Ligier JS P325	DAY; 1	DAY; 2	AUS1; 1	AUS1; 2	SEB; 3	AUS2; 5	MOH; 1	MOH; 2	VIR; 1	MOS; 1	MOS; 2	ELK; 2	ATL; 1; 9	ATL; 2; 7	8th	1690
