= SIN Cars =

Bulgarian supercar manufacturer

Sin Cars GmbH
- Type: Private limited company
- Industry: Automotive
- Founded: 2012; 14 years ago
- Founder: Rosen Daskalov
- Headquarters: Ruse, Bulgaria
- Key people: Rosen Daskalov (Chairman and CEO)
- Products: Sport cars
- Website: sincars.co.uk

Sin Cars is a Bulgarian sports car manufacturer founded in 2012 and based in Bulgaria and Germany.

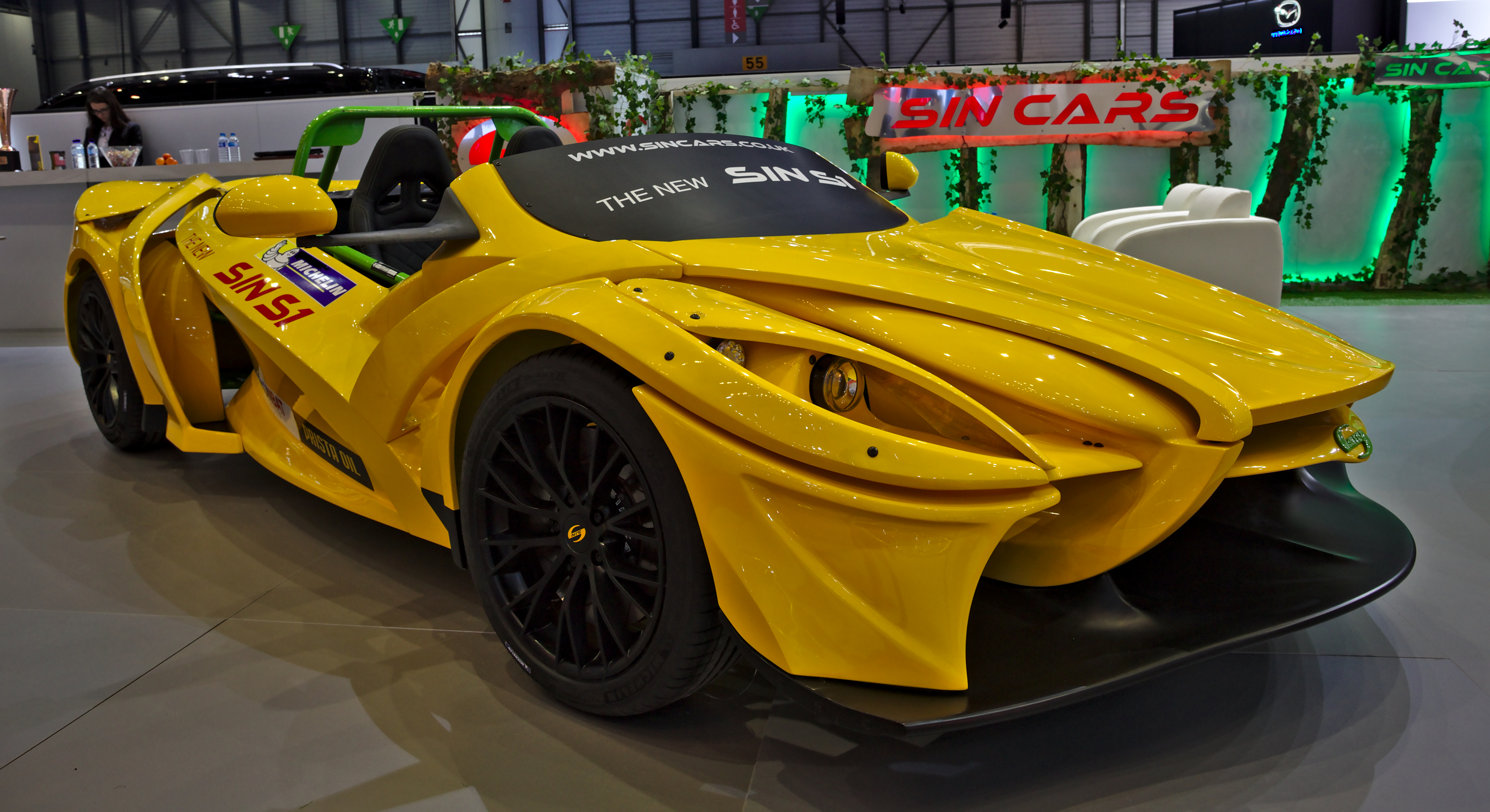
Sin S1 at the 2018 Geneva Motor Show

== History ==
=== Foundation and future plans ===
SIN Cars was founded as SIN Cars Limited by the Bulgarian engineer and racing driver Rosen Daskalov in Great Britain in 2012. In 2015, the company started production of road-legal sportscar Sin R1. This vehicle features a 6.2-litre V8 engine, producing 444 bhp and can reach 62 mph in 3.5 seconds. The company moved its headquarters to Munich, Germany and finally to Ruse, Bulgaria.

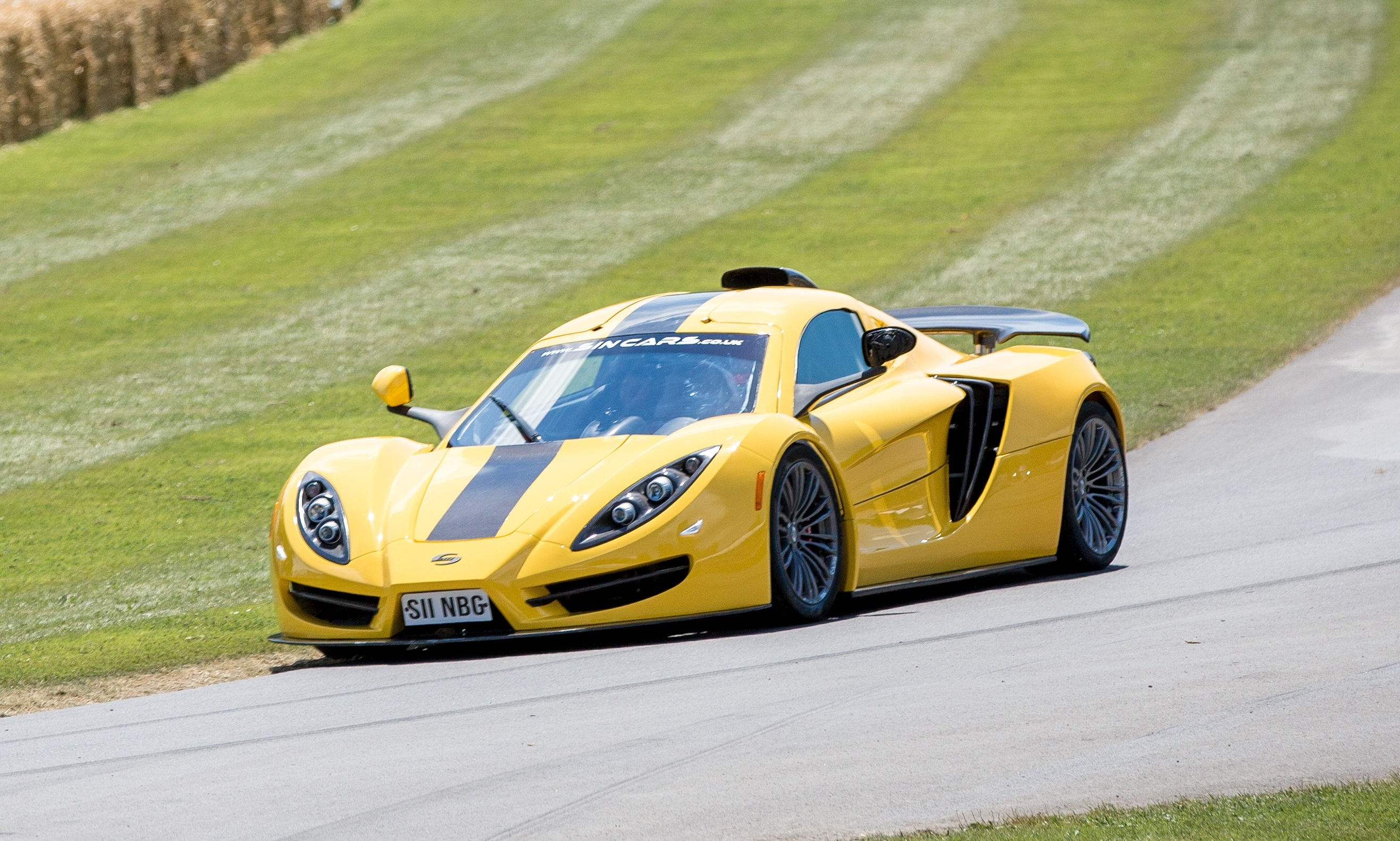
Sin R1 at the 2014 Goodwood Festival of Speed

In November 2018 it announced plans to finance expansion into the electric-cars market with Daskalov saying "Our goal is to sell a multifunctional small city car which will be used for courier deliveries, taxi services, transportation. European cities need this kind of transport. City centers will soon be closed for diesel cars. China is far ahead of us, but we can offer better quality."

=== Racing series ===
SIN entered the GT4 European Series for the 2015 season with the specified Sin R1 GT4 model. Sofia Car Motorsport finished on 8th place in the final standings.

For 2016, the team Racers Edge Motorsports joined Pirelli World Challenge using SIN R1 GT4 specification for the season.

== Models ==
- SIN L City Sun (Club Car)
- Sin L City (Van)
- SIN R1 (road car)
- SIN R1 GT4 (racing car)
- SIN S1 (modular car)
