= Aston Martin Vantage GT4 =

Aston Martin GT4
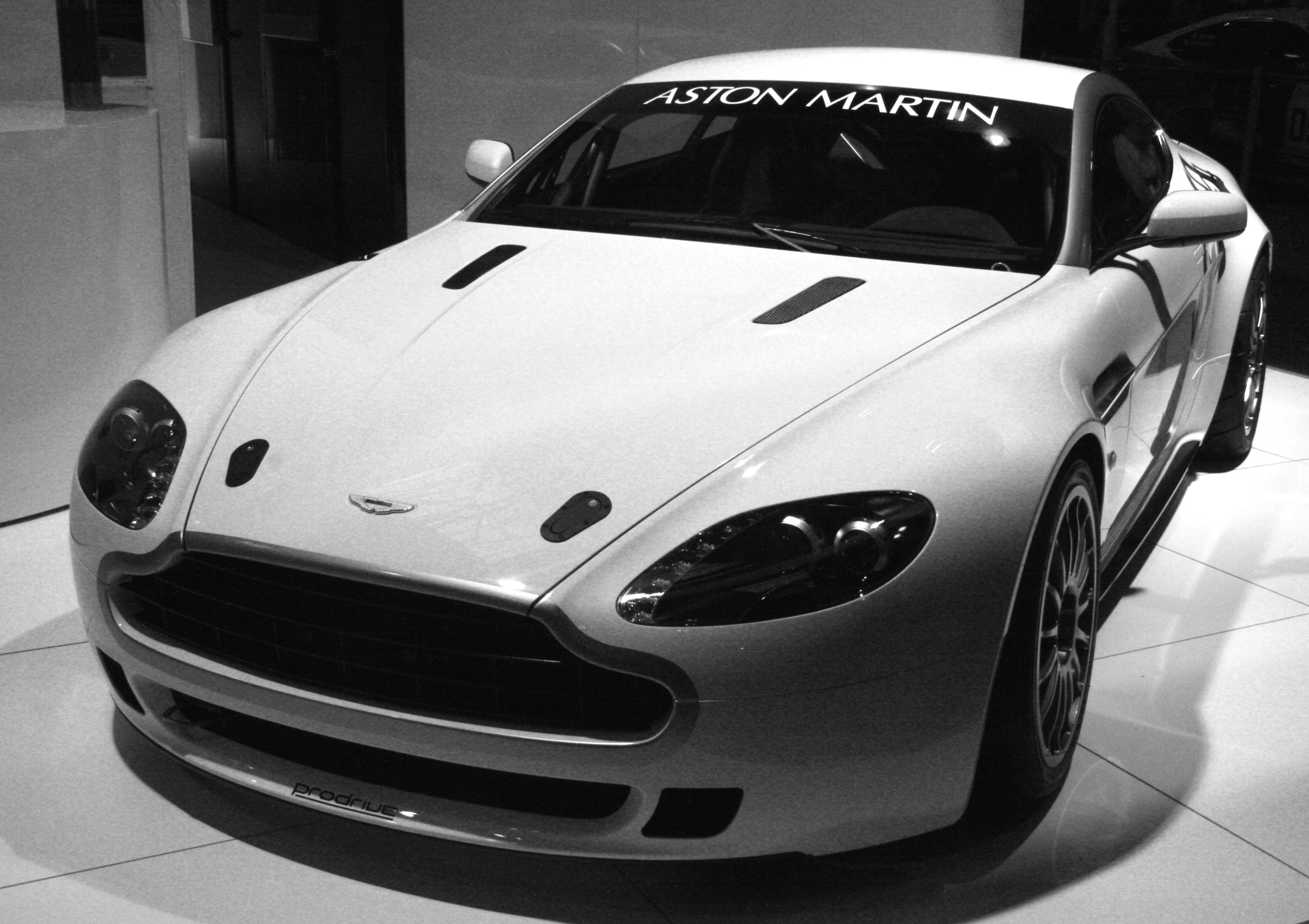
- The Prodrive GT4 at 2009 Autosport International
- Category: Sports car racing
- Constructor: Aston Martin Lagonda LTD
- Successor: Aston Martin Vantage (2018)

Technical specifications
- Length: 4,380 mm (172.4 in)
- Width: 1,865 mm (73.4 in)
- Height: 1,210 mm (47.6 in)
- Axle track: Front 1,580 mm (62.2 in); Rear 1,590 mm (62.6 in)
- Wheelbase: 2,600 mm (102.4 in)
- Engine: Aston Martin 4,735 cc (4.7 L; 288.9 cu in), V8, naturally aspirated, FMR
- Transmission: 6-speed manual or Sportshift
- Weight: 1,350 kg (2,980 lb)

Competition history

The Aston Martin Vantage GT4 is a race car introduced by Aston Martin in late 2008. It is an updated version of the Aston Martin V8 Vantage N24. Its primary alteration is the introduction of the new 4.7-litre V8 that also debuted in the production V8 Vantage. This replaces the 4.3-litre V8 in the V8 Vantage N24.

== Development ==
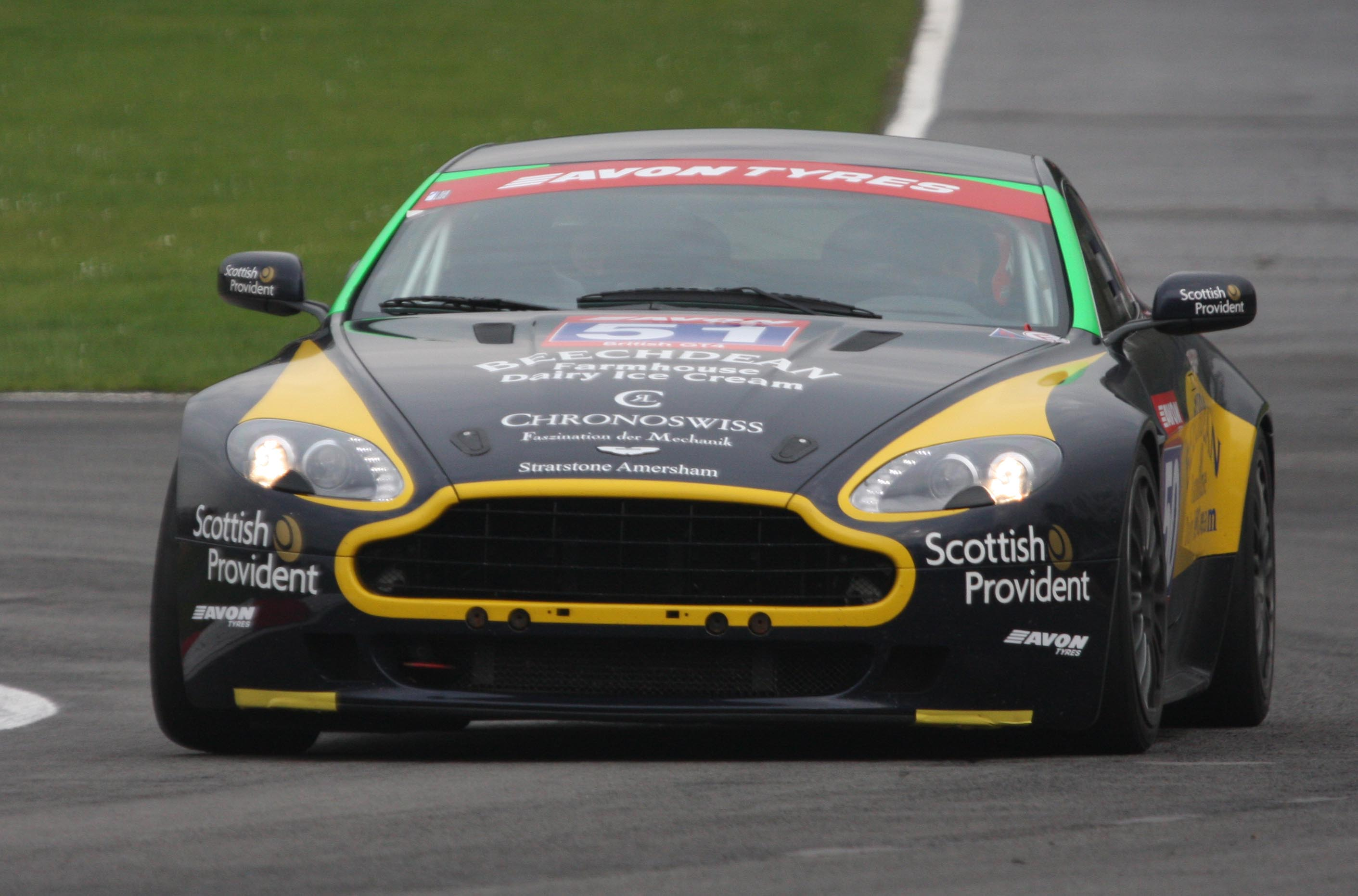
Barwell-Beechdean Vantage GT4 at Brands Hatch in 2009

The Aston Martin Vantage GT4 is the evolution of the successful Aston Martin V8 Vantage N24 car. It has an enlarged 4.7-litre engine and uprated suspension, allowing for increased camber and castor angles. The brakes have also been uprated with larger diameter front discs and racing pads.

The Vantage GT4 car has been built to FIA GT4 regulations making it eligible to compete in FIA European GT4 and FIA GT4 world endurance races.

== 2011 GT4 ==
In 2011 Aston Martin upgraded the specification of the Vantage GT4, with better aerodynamics, and increased engine power. Aerodynamic alterations include, a new front splitter for greater front downforce and greater rear downforce through a redesigned floor, new diffuser and a boot flip. The 2011 GT4 also comes with the option of a traction control system and a Bosch ABS system.
