= Mads Siljehaug =

Norwegian racing driver (born 1996)

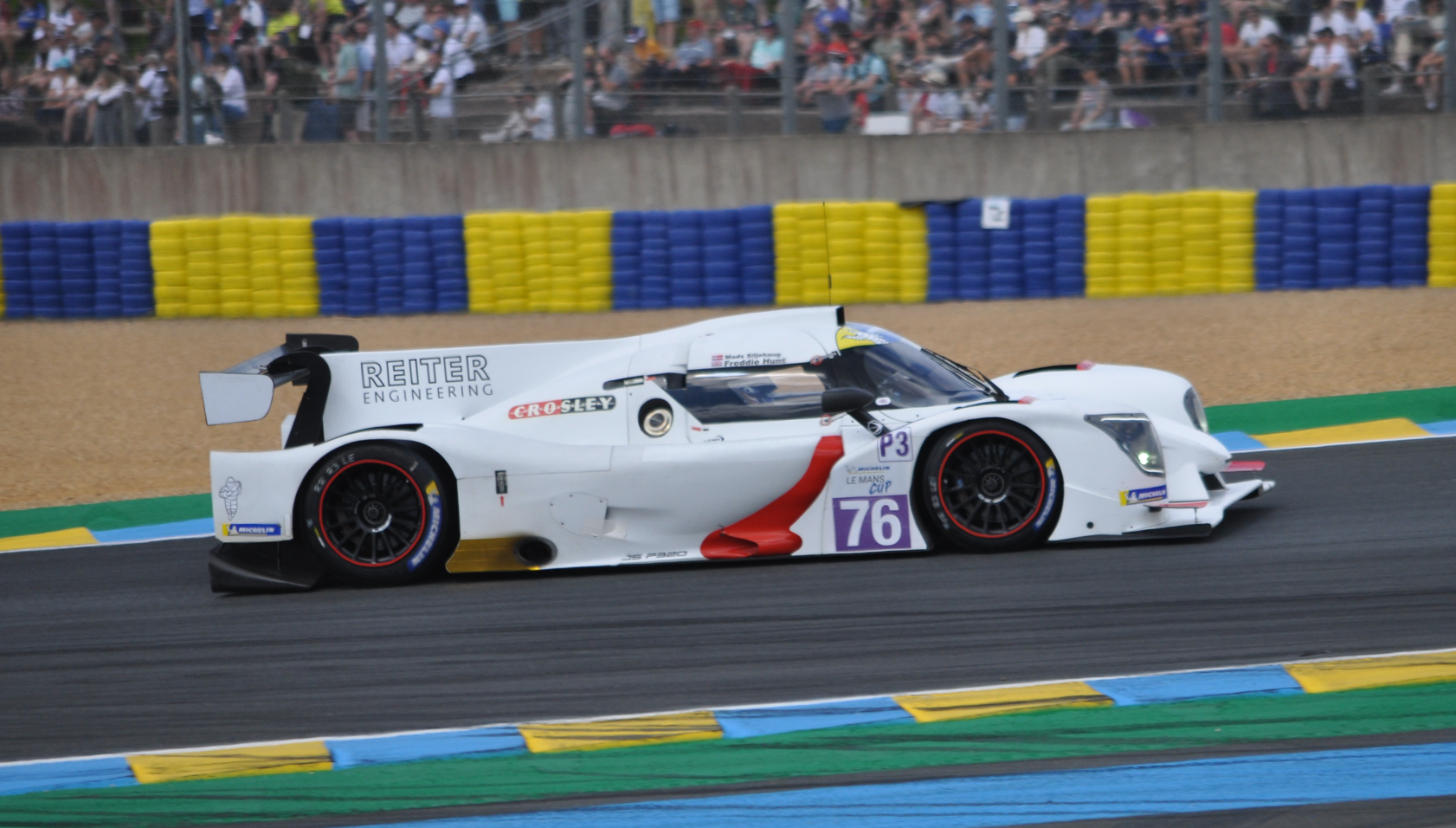
- Siljehaug in 2022
- Nationality: (Norway) Norwegian
- Born: 6 February 1996 (age 30) Lillehammer, Norway
- Categorisation: FIA Silver

Championship titles
- 2019 2013 2012: ADAC GT4 Germany; Formula Basic – Norwegian Cup; Formula Basic – Norwegian Championship

Mads Emil Hørlyk Siljehaug (born 6 February 1996) is a Norwegian racing driver who last competed in GT World Challenge America for Chicago Performance and Tuning Co. A former Reiter Engineering stalwart in GT4 and LMP3, he is the 2019 ADAC GT4 Germany champion and 2022 Le Mans Cup runner-up.

== Career ==
Siljehaug made his single-seater debut in 2012, racing in Formula Basic and winning the Norwegian Championship in his rookie year, and the Norwegian Cup the following year. After a two-year hiatus, Siljehaug joined KTM-affiliated Reiter Engineering to race in the GT4 European Series as a member of the team's Young Stars programme. In his first season in the series, Siljehaug took an overall win at Zandvoort and a Pro class win at Spa to secure runner-up honors in points. Remaining with the team for 2017, Siljehaug took a lone podium at Zandvoort to end the year 12th in the Silver Cup standings.

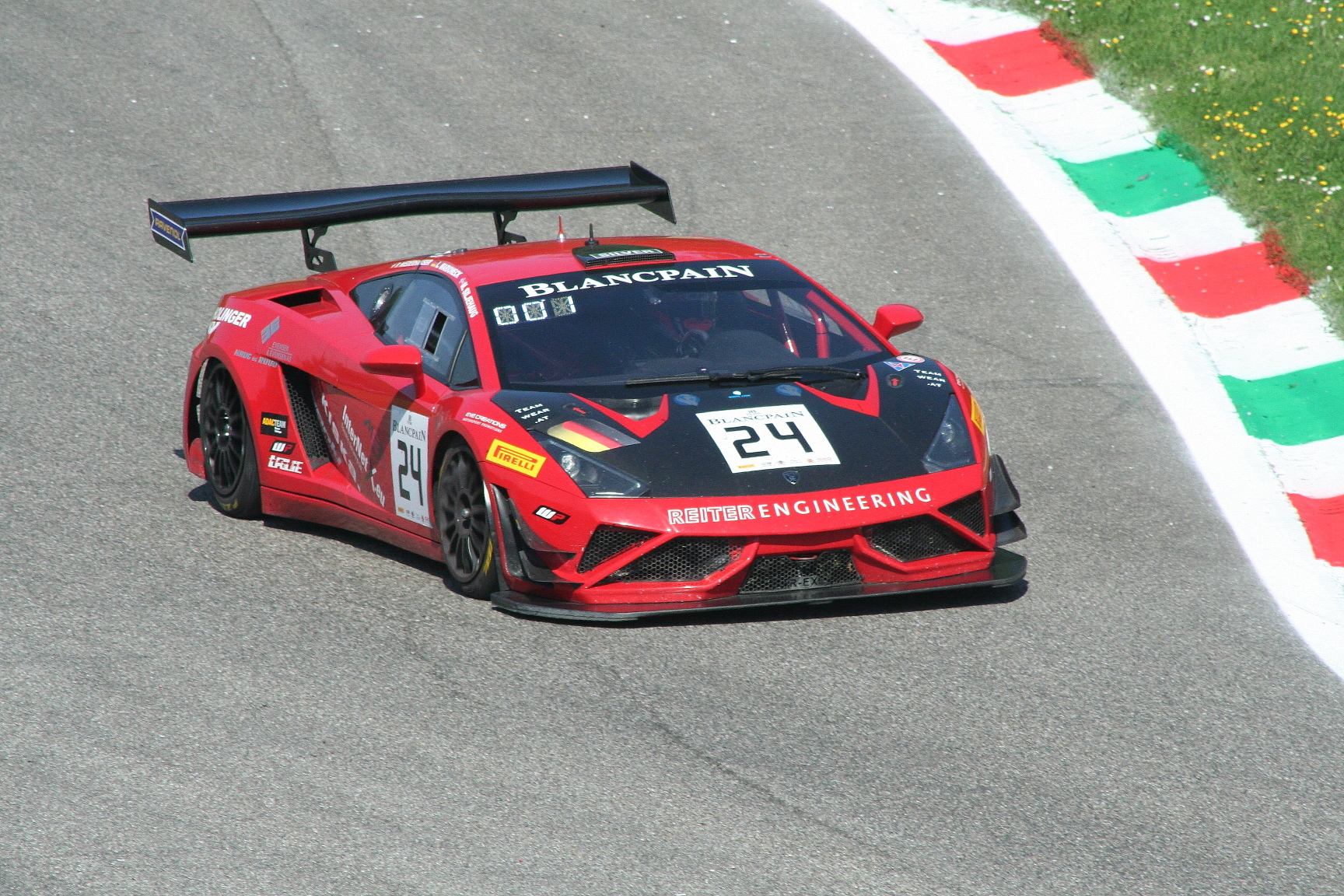
Siljehaug driving Reiter Engineering's Lamborghini at Monza during the 2018 Blancpain GT Series.

After winning the Reiter Young Stars competition in late 2017, Siljehaug continued with the team to make his GT3 debut in the 2018 Blancpain GT Series Endurance Cup. Racing a Lamborghini Gallardo R-EX at all events except the 24 Hours of Spa, he scored a lone Silver Cup podium at Le Castellet alongside Patric Niederhauser and Lennart Marioneck. During 2018, Siljehaug made select appearances for the team's GT4 squad, most notably winning twice in the GT4 Central European Cup. In 2019, Siljehaug settled for a dual campaign in the GT4 European Series and the newly-created ADAC GT4 Germany. In the former, Siljehaug qualified on pole at both Misano and Zandvoort, as well as taking his only podium in the latter round en route to a 12th-place points finish in the Silver Cup. In ADAC GT4, Siljehaug scored wins at Zandvoort and Sachsenring and a pair of second-place finishes to secure the title for Felbermayr - Reiter.

Staying in GT4 competition for 2020, Siljehaug switched to the GT4 America SprintX series with fellow KTM-fielding team Marco Polo Motorsports. In his first season in the series, Siljehaug took overall wins at Sonoma and Road America, as well as four other Silver Cup podiums to end the year fourth in points. During 2020, Siljehaug also made a one-off return to ADAC GT4 Germany with McLaren-fielding Dörr Motorsport at the Red Bull Ring. Returning to Reiter Engineering for the following year, Siljehaug raced with them in select rounds of the 24H GT Series in the GTX class. Racing a KTM X-Bow GTX Concept, Siljehaug scored wins at Mugello, Le Castellet and Barcelona to secure runner-up honors in the class standings. During 2021, Siljehaug also raced for Marco Polo Motorsports in the first three rounds of GT4 America, taking a class podium at Sonoma, as well as making a one-off appearance in Super Super Trucks at Long Beach, taking pole for race two.

Siljehaug on his way to second in LMP3 at the 2022 Road to Le Mans.

Siljehaug switched over to LMP3 in 2022, joining Freddie Hunt in the Le Mans Cup as Reiter undertook its first prototype campaign. At the wheel of a Ligier JS P320, Siljehaug won at Algarve and scored maximum points in race two at Le Mans as he ended the year runner-up in points. During 2022, Siljehaug also raced for the team's "True Racing" banner in select rounds of the Nürburgring Langstrecken-Serie in the SPX class. After competing in time attack events throughout the following two years, Siljehaug returned to competitive racing in 2025, joining Marco Polo Motorsports to race in the GT4 America Series. Racing a Toyota GR Supra GT4 Evo2 for select rounds, Siljehaug scored Silver Cup podiums at Road America and Barber, as well as a pole at Sonoma en route to ninth in points.

The following year, Siljehaug joined Lamborghini-fielding Chicago Performance to make his GT World Challenge America debut in the Pro-Am class with Nicolai Elghanayan. What was supposed to be a full-time campaign for Siljehaug became part-time when the team was unable to find a replacement for Elghananyan during most of the calendar. As a result, Siljehaug contested three races, including the Indianapolis 8 Hour in which he and Elghananyan were joined by Lamborghini factory driver Loris Spinelli.

== Karting record ==
=== Karting career summary ===
Season	Series	Team	Position
2009	Göteborgs Stora Pris – Mini		DNF
2010	Norwegian Championship – Formula Yamaha		12th
2011	Norwegian Championship – Formula Yamaha		8th
2012	Norwegian Championship – KZ2		24th

== Racing record ==
=== Racing career summary ===
Season	Series	Team	Races	Wins	Poles	F/Laps	Podiums	Points	Position
2012	Formula Basic – Norwegian Cup							66	4th
2012	Formula Basic – Factor-X Cup		4	2	1	0	2	47	8th
2012	Formula Basic – Norwegian Championship								**1st**
2013	Formula Basic – Norwegian Cup	NMK Sör-Gudbrandsdal	10	7	4	5	8	185	**1st**
2016	GT4 European Series – Pro	RYS Team Hohenberg	9	2	0	1	4	112.5	**2nd**
2016	British GT Championship – GT4	RYS Team Hohenberg	1	0	0	0	0	0	NC†
2017	GT4 European Series Northern Cup – Silver	RYS Team InterNetX	10	0	0	1	1	66	12th
2017	GT4 European Series Northern Cup – Silver	RYS Team True Racing	2	0	0	0	0	66	12th
2018	Blancpain GT Series Endurance Cup	Reiter Young Stars	4	0	0	0	0	0	NC
2018	Blancpain GT Series Endurance Cup – Silver	Reiter Young Stars	4	0	0	0	1	36	11th
2018	GT4 Central European Cup – Pro-Am	K Racing - Reiter	2	1	0	1	1	70	7th
2018	GT4 Central European Cup – Pro-Am	True Racing - Reiter	2	1	0	1	1	70	7th
2018	GT4 European Series – Silver	Felbermayr - Reiter	2	0	0	0	1	0	NC†
2019	GT4 European Series – Silver	Valvoline - True Racing	12	0	1	1	1	30	12th
2019	ADAC GT4 Germany	Felbermayr - Reiter	12	2	2	2	4	149	**1st**
2020	GT4 America SprintX – Silver	Marco Polo Motorsports	14	3	5	4	7	186	4th
2020	ADAC GT4 Germany	Dörr Motorsport	2	0	0	0	0	0	NC†
2021	GT4 America Series – Silver	Marco Polo Motorsports	6	0	0	1	1	67	8th
2021	24H GT Series – GTX	Reiter Engineering	4	3	0	0	4	81	**2nd**
2021	Nürburgring Langstrecken-Serie – Cup X	Teichmann Racing GT4	2	0	0	0	1	0	NC
2021	Stadium Super Trucks	N/A	2	0	1	0	0	19	20th
2022	Le Mans Cup – LMP3	Reiter Engineering	7	1	2	0	3	73	**2nd**
2022	Prototype Cup Germany	Reiter Engineering	2	1	0	0	2	41	11th
2022	Nürburgring Langstrecken-Serie – SPX	True Racing	3	0	0	0	0	0	NC
2022	24 Hours of Nürburgring – SPX	KTM True Racing	1	0	0	0	0	—N/a	DNF
2025	GT4 America Series – Silver	Marco Polo Motorsports	9	0	1	0	2	77	9th
2026	GT World Challenge America – Pro-Am	Chicago Performance and Tuning Co.	3	0	0	0	0	12	15th

^{†} As Siljehaug was a guest driver, he was ineligible to score points.

=== Complete GT4 European Series results ===
(key) (Races in bold indicate pole position) (Races in italics indicate fastest lap)

Year	Team	Car	Class	1	2	3	4	5	6	7	8	9	10	11	12	Pos	Points
2016	RYS Team Hohenberg	KTM X-Bow GT4	Pro	MNZ; 1 EX	MNZ; 2 Ret	PAU; 1; 3	PAU; 2 Ret	SIL	SPA; 2	HUN; 1; 4	HUN; 2; 8	ZAN; 1; 1	ZAN; 2; 3			2nd	112.5
2017	RYS Team InterNetX	KTM X-Bow GT4	Silver	MIS; 1; 17	MIS; 2 DSQ			RBR; 1; 6	RBR; 2; 14	SVK; 1 DSQ	SVK; 2 Ret	ZAN; 1; 2	ZAN; 2; 30	NÜR; 1; 5	NÜR; 2; 7	12th	66
2017	RYS Team True Racing	KTM X-Bow GT4	Silver			BRH; 1; 14	BRH; 2; 7									12th	66
2018	Felbermayr - Reiter	KTM X-Bow GT4	Silver	ZOL; 1	ZOL; 2	BRH; 1	BRH; 2	MIS; 1	MIS; 2	SPA; 1	SPA; 2	HUN; 1; 4	HUN; 2; 3	NÜR; 1	NÜR; 2	NC†	0†
2019	Valvoline - True Racing	KTM X-Bow GT4	Silver	MNZ; 1 Ret	MNZ; 2 Ret	BRH; 1; 23	BRH; 2; 18	LEC; 1; 31	LEC; 2 Ret	**MIS**; **1**; 15	MIS; 2 Ret	**ZAN**; **1**; 3	ZAN; 2 Ret	NÜR; 1; 11	NÜR; 2; 5	12th	30

=== Complete GT World Challenge Europe results ===
==== GT World Challenge Europe Endurance Cup ====
Year	Team	Car	Class	1	2	3	4	5	6	7	Pos.	Points
2018	Reiter Young Stars	Lamborghini Gallardo R-EX	Silver	MNZ; 16	SIL; 23	LEC; Ret	SPA; 6H	SPA; 12H	SPA; 24H	CAT; 36	11th	36

=== Complete ADAC GT4 Germany results ===
(key) (Races in bold indicate pole position) (Races in italics indicate fastest lap)

Year	Team	Car	1	2	3	4	5	6	7	8	9	10	11	12	DC	Points
2019	Felbermayr - Reiter	KTM X-Bow GT4	OSC; 1; 5	OSC; 2; 2	RBR; 1; 8	RBR; 2 Ret	ZAN; 1; 2	**ZAN**; **2**; 1	NÜR; 1; 10	NÜR; 2; 9	HOC; 1; 5	HOC; 2; 11	**SAC**; **1**; 1	SAC; 2; 7	1st	149
2020	Dörr Motorsport	McLaren 570S GT4	NÜR; 1	NÜR; 2	HOC; 1	HOC; 2	SAC; 1	SAC; 2	RBR; 1; 6	RBR; 2; 4	LAU; 1	LAU; 2	OSC; 1	OSC; 2	NC†	0†

=== Complete Le Mans Cup results ===
(key) (Races in bold indicate pole position; results in italics indicate fastest lap)

Year	Entrant	Class	Chassis	1	2	3	4	5	6	7	Rank	Points
2022	Reiter Engineering	LMP3	Ligier JS P320	LEC; 11	IMO; 16	LMS; 1; 5	LMS; 2; 2	MNZ; 6	SPA; 2	ALG; 1	2nd	73
