= 2020 GT4 America Series =

Racing series

The 2020 Pirelli GT4 America Series was the second season of the GT4 America Series. The series is split into a Sprint series, which features 50-minute races with one driver per car, and a SprintX series, which features one-hour races with two drivers per car and a mandatory driver change during Pit stops. The season begins on 7 March at Circuit of the Americas and ends on 3 October at Indianapolis Motor Speedway.

== Calendar ==
The final calendar was announced on 12 November 2019 Due to the COVID-19 pandemic, the SprintX and Sprint rounds at St. Petersburg and Long Beach were cancelled and replaced with tripleheaders at Virginia International Raceway and Sonoma Raceway.

Round	Circuit	Date
1	(United States) Circuit of the Americas, Elroy, Texas	7–8 March
2	(United States) Virginia International Raceway, Alton, Virginia	9–12 July
3	(United States) Sonoma Raceway, Sonoma, California	8–9 August
4	(United States) Road America, Elkhart Lake, Wisconsin	29–30 August
5	(United States) Circuit of the Americas, Elroy, Texas	19–20 September
6	(United States) Indianapolis Motor Speedway, Speedway, Indiana	2–3 October

== Entry list ==
=== SprintX ===
Team	Car	No.	Drivers	Class	Rounds
(United States) GMG Racing	Porsche Cayman GT4 Clubsport MR	2	(United States) Jason Bell	PA	All
(United States) GMG Racing	Porsche Cayman GT4 Clubsport MR	2	(United States) Andrew Davis	PA	All
(United States) GMG Racing	Audi R8 LMS GT4	8	(United States) Elias Sabo	PA	1, 3
(United States) GMG Racing	Audi R8 LMS GT4	8	(United States) Andy Lee	PA	1, 3
(United States) GMG Racing	Audi R8 LMS GT4	14	(United States) Michael McGrath	Am	1, 3
(United States) GMG Racing	Audi R8 LMS GT4	14	(United States) Alex Welch	Am	1, 3
(United States) Motorsport USA	McLaren 570S GT4	3	(United States) Michael McAleenan	Am	1, 3, 5–6
(United States) Motorsport USA	McLaren 570S GT4	3	(United States) Dan Rogers	Am	1, 3, 5–6
(United States) Motorsport USA	McLaren 570S GT4	111	(United States) Todd Clarke	Am	3, 5–6
(United States) Motorsport USA	McLaren 570S GT4	111	(United States) Ty Clarke	Am	3, 5–6
(United States) Nolasport	Porsche 718 Cayman GT4 Clubsport	7	(United States) Zac Anderson	Am	All
(United States) Nolasport	Porsche 718 Cayman GT4 Clubsport	7	(United States) Sean Gibbons	Am	All
(United States) Nolasport	Porsche 718 Cayman GT4 Clubsport	47	(United States) Jason Hart	PA	All
(United States) Nolasport	Porsche 718 Cayman GT4 Clubsport	47	(United States) Matt Travis	PA	All
(United States) Nolasport	Porsche Cayman GT4 Clubsport MR	46	(United States) John Dubets	S	1
(United States) Nolasport	Porsche Cayman GT4 Clubsport MR	46	(United States) Austen Smith	S	1
(United States) Nolasport	Porsche 718 Cayman GT4 Clubsport	46	(United States) David Walker	Am	3–6
(United States) Nolasport	Porsche 718 Cayman GT4 Clubsport	46	(United States) Russell Walker	Am	3–6
(United States) BSport Racing	Aston Martin Vantage AMR GT4	15	(United States) Kenton Koch	PA	All
(United States) BSport Racing	Aston Martin Vantage AMR GT4	15	(United States) Bryan Putt	PA	All
(United States) Rearden Racing	Mercedes-AMG GT4	16	(United States) John Allen	Am	2–4
(United States) Rearden Racing	Mercedes-AMG GT4	16	(United States) Kris Wilson	Am	2–4
(United States) Rearden Racing	Aston Martin Vantage AMR GT4	91	(United States) Jeff Burton	PA	1–3, 5
(United States) Rearden Racing	Aston Martin Vantage AMR GT4	91	(United States) Vesko Kozarov	PA	1–3, 5
(United States) Rearden Racing	Aston Martin Vantage AMR GT4	191	(United States) Vesko Kozarov	PA	4
(United States) Rearden Racing	Aston Martin Vantage AMR GT4	191	(United States) Jeff Burton	PA	4
(United States) TRG - The Racers Group	Porsche 718 Cayman GT4 Clubsport	17	(United States) Derek DeBoer	Am	All
(United States) TRG - The Racers Group	Porsche 718 Cayman GT4 Clubsport	17	(United States) James Rappaport	Am	All
(United States) TRG - The Racers Group	Porsche 718 Cayman GT4 Clubsport	23	(United States) Craig Lyons	PA	1
(United States) TRG - The Racers Group	Porsche 718 Cayman GT4 Clubsport	23	(United States) Spencer Pumpelly	PA	1
(United States) Stephen Cameron Racing	BMW M4 GT4	19	(United States) Greg Liefooghe	PA	All
(United States) Stephen Cameron Racing	BMW M4 GT4	19	(United States) Sean Quinlan	PA	All
(United States) Flying Lizard Motorsports	Aston Martin Vantage AMR GT4	21	(United States) Michael Dinan	PA	1, 3–6
(United States) Flying Lizard Motorsports	Aston Martin Vantage AMR GT4	21	(United States) Robby Foley	PA	1, 3–6
(United States) Flying Lizard Motorsports	Aston Martin Vantage AMR GT4	210	(United States) Robby Foley	PA	2
(United States) Flying Lizard Motorsports	Aston Martin Vantage AMR GT4	210	(United States) Michael Dinan	PA	2
(United States) Flying Lizard Motorsports	McLaren 570S GT4	30	(United States) Michael Cooper	PA	All
(United States) Flying Lizard Motorsports	McLaren 570S GT4	30	(United States) Erin Vogel	PA	All
(United States) CCR Team TFB	BMW M4 GT4	25	(United States) Cole Ciraulo	S	All
(United States) CCR Team TFB	BMW M4 GT4	25	(United States) Tim Barber	S	All
(United States) Classic BMW	BMW M4 GT4	26	(United States) Toby Grahovec	PA	1
(United States) Classic BMW	BMW M4 GT4	26	(United States) John Rader	PA	1
(United States) Classic BMW	BMW M4 GT4	26	(United States) Toby Grahovec	S	2–6
(United States) Classic BMW	BMW M4 GT4	26	(United States) Chandler Hull	S	2–6
(Canada) ST Racing	BMW M4 GT4	28	(United States) Harry Gottsacker	S	All
(Canada) ST Racing	BMW M4 GT4	28	(Canada) Nick Wittmer	S	All
(Canada) ST Racing	BMW M4 GT4	38	(United States) Jon Miller	S	All
(Canada) ST Racing	BMW M4 GT4	38	(Canada) Samantha Tan	S	All
(United States) RS1 (United States) Notlad Racing by RS1	Aston Martin Vantage AMR GT4	33	(United States) Joe Dalton	PA	All
(United States) RS1 (United States) Notlad Racing by RS1	Aston Martin Vantage AMR GT4	33	(United States) Patrick Gallagher	PA	All
(United States) RS1 (United States) Notlad Racing by RS1	Porsche 718 Cayman GT4 Clubsport	37	(United States) Charlie Bellurado	PA	All
(United States) RS1 (United States) Notlad Racing by RS1	Porsche 718 Cayman GT4 Clubsport	37	(Belgium) Jan Heylen	PA	All
(United States) Murillo Racing	Mercedes-AMG GT4	34	(United States) Matt Fassnacht	PA	1
(United States) Murillo Racing	Mercedes-AMG GT4	34	(United States) Christian Szymczak	PA	1
(United States) Andretti Autosport	McLaren 570S GT4	36	(United States) Jarett Andretti	S	All
(United States) Andretti Autosport	McLaren 570S GT4	36	(United States) Colin Mullan	S	All
(United States) Team Panoz Racing	Panoz Avezzano GT4	50	(United States) Ian James	PA	4–6
(United States) Team Panoz Racing	Panoz Avezzano GT4	50	(United States) Matthew Keegan	PA	4–6
(United States) Team Panoz Racing	Panoz Avezzano GT4	51	(Canada) Roman De Angelis	S	5–6
(United States) Team Panoz Racing	Panoz Avezzano GT4	51	(United States) Parker Chase	S	5–6
(United States) Black Swan Racing	Porsche Cayman GT4 Clubsport MR	54	(Netherlands) Jeroen Bleekemolen	PA	1
(United States) Black Swan Racing	Porsche Cayman GT4 Clubsport MR	54	(United States) Tim Pappas	PA	1
(United States) Dexter Racing	Ginetta G55 GT4	63	(United States) Ben Anderson	PA	1, 5
(United States) Dexter Racing	Ginetta G55 GT4	63	(United States) Warren Dexter	PA	1, 5
(United States) Dexter Racing	Ginetta G55 GT4	63	(United States) Ryan Dexter	S	3
(United States) Dexter Racing	Ginetta G55 GT4	63	(United States) Cody Ware	S	3
(United States) BGB Motorsports Group	Porsche Cayman GT4 Clubsport MR	69	(Canada) Tom Collingwood	Am	2, 4, 6
(United States) BGB Motorsports Group	Porsche Cayman GT4 Clubsport MR	69	(United States) John Tecce	Am	2, 4, 6
(United States) Marco Polo Motorsports	KTM X-Bow GT4 Evo	71	(United States) Nicolai Elghanayan	S	All
(United States) Marco Polo Motorsports	KTM X-Bow GT4 Evo	71	(Norway) Mads Siljehaug	S	All
(United States) Marco Polo Motorsports	KTM X-Bow GT4 Evo	74	(United States) Dieter-Heinz Kijora	Am	6
(United States) Marco Polo Motorsports	KTM X-Bow GT4 Evo	74	(United States) Vincent Piemonte	Am	6
(Canada) Compass Racing	McLaren 570S GT4	77	(United States) Anthony Geraci	Am	1
(Canada) Compass Racing	McLaren 570S GT4	77	(United States) Richard Golinello	Am	1
(Canada) Compass Racing	McLaren 570S GT4	77	(United States) Ray Mason III	Am	4
(Canada) Compass Racing	McLaren 570S GT4	77	(United States) Ross Thompson	Am	4
(United States) BimmerWorld Racing	BMW M4 GT4	82	(United States) Bill Auberlen	PA	All
(United States) BimmerWorld Racing	BMW M4 GT4	82	(United States) James Walker Jr.	PA	All

Icon	Class
S	Silver Cup
PA	Pro-Am Cup
Am	Am Cup

=== Sprint ===
Team	Car	No.	Drivers	Class	Rounds
(United States) GMG Racing	Porsche 718 Cayman GT4 Clubsport	2	(United States) Jason Bell	Am	All
(United States) Blackdog Speed Shop	McLaren 570S GT4	10	(United States) Michael Cooper	Pro	All
(United States) Blackdog Speed Shop	McLaren 570S GT4	11	(United States) Tony Gaples	Am	1, 4–6
(United States) Ian Lacy Racing	Ford Mustang GT4	12	(United States) Drew Staveley	Pro	All
(United States) Ian Lacy Racing	Ford Mustang GT4	24	(United States) Frank Gannett	Am	All
(United States) Andretti Autosport	McLaren 570S GT4	18	(United States) Jarett Andretti	Pro	All
(United States) Precision Driving Tech	BMW M4 GT4	22	(Serbia) Marko Radisic	Am	1
(United States) Classic BMW	BMW M4 GT4	26	(United States) Toby Grahovec	Pro	1
(United States) PF Racing	Ford Mustang GT4	40	(United States) James Pesek	Pro	2
(United States) Nolasport	Porsche 718 Cayman GT4 Clubsport	48	(United States) Jason Hall	Am	4–5
(United States) Nolasport	Porsche 718 Cayman GT4 Clubsport	48	(United States) Matt Travis	Am	6
(United States) Black Swan Racing	Porsche Cayman GT4 Clubsport MR	54	(United States) Tim Pappas	Am	1
(United States) Rearden Racing	Aston Martin Vantage AMR GT4	59	(United States) Paul Terry	Am	All
(United States) Rearden Racing	Aston Martin Vantage AMR GT4	91	(United States) Jeff Burton	Am	1, 5–6
(United States) Rearden Racing	Aston Martin Vantage AMR GT4	191	(United States) Jeff Burton	Am	2–4
(United States) KPR	SIN R1 GT4	62	(United States) Mark Klenin	Am	1–5
(United States) TRG - The Racers Group	Porsche 718 Cayman GT4 Clubsport	66	(United States) Spencer Pumpelly	Pro	1–4
(United States) BGB Motorsports	BMW M4 GT4	69	(Canada) Tom Collingwood	Am	2
(United States) C.G. Racing Inc.	Mercedes-AMG GT4	79	(United States) Christopher Gumprecht	Am	2^{STP}, 4, 6
(United States) RecStuff Racing	Aston Martin Vantage AMR GT4	89	(Canada) Fred Roberts	Am	1
(United States) RecStuff Racing	Mercedes-AMG GT4	99	(United States) Jeff Courtney	Am	1–2, 4, 6
(United States) Stephen Cameron Racing	BMW M4 GT4	119	(United States) Sean Quinlan	Am	All
(United States) Flying Lizard Motorsports	Aston Martin Vantage AMR GT4	210	(United States) Michael Dinan	Am	All

Icon	Class
Pro	Pro Cup
Am	Am Cup

Note: A car marked with ^{STP} is entered only for the St. Petersburg makeup races at VIR.

== Race results ==
Bold indicates overall winner

=== SprintX ===
Round		Circuit	Pole position	Silver Winners	Pro-Am Winners	Am Winners
1	R1	(United States) Austin	(United States) No. 71 Marco Polo Motorsports	(United States) No. 36 Andretti Autosport	**(United States) No. 47 Nolasport**	(United States) No. 7 Nolasport
1	R1	(United States) Austin	(United States) Nicolai Elghanayan (Norway) Mads Siljehaug	(United States) Jarett Andretti (United States) Colin Mullan	**(United States) Jason Hart** **(United States) Matt Travis**	(United States) Zac Anderson (United States) Sean Gibbons
1	R2	(United States) Austin	(United States) No.2 GMG Racing	(Canada) No. 28 ST Racing	**(United States) No. 47 Nolasport**	(United States) No. 7 Nolasport
1	R2	(United States) Austin	(United States) Jason Bell (United States) Andrew Davis	(United States) Harry Gottsacker (Canada) Nick Wittmer	**(United States) Jason Hart** **(United States) Matt Travis**	(United States) Zac Anderson (United States) Sean Gibbons
2	R1	(United States) Virginia	(Canada) No. 28 ST Racing	(Canada) No. 28 ST Racing	**(United States) No. 82 BimmerWorld Racing**	(United States) No. 16 Rearden Racing
2	R1	(United States) Virginia	(United States) Harry Gottsacker (Canada) Nick Wittmer	(United States) Harry Gottsacker (Canada) Nick Wittmer	**(United States) Bill Auberlen** **(United States) James Walker Jr.**	(United States) John Allen (United States) Kris Wilson
2	R2	(United States) Virginia	(United States) No. 82 BimmerWorld Racing	(United States) No. 26 Classic BMW	**(United States) No. 82 BimmerWorld Racing**	(United States) No. 16 Rearden Racing
2	R2	(United States) Virginia	(United States) Bill Auberlen (United States) James Walker Jr.	(United States) Toby Grahovec (United States) Chandler Hull	**(United States) Bill Auberlen** **(United States) James Walker Jr.**	(United States) John Allen (United States) Kris Wilson
2	R3	(United States) Virginia		(United States) No. 36 Andretti Autosport	**(United States) No. 47 Nolasport**	(United States) No. 7 Nolasport
2	R3	(United States) Virginia		(United States) Jarett Andretti (United States) Colin Mullan	**(United States) Jason Hart** **(United States) Matt Travis**	(United States) Zac Anderson (United States) Sean Gibbons
3	R1	(United States) Sonoma	(United States) No. 71 Marco Polo Motorsports	(United States) No. 36 Andretti Autosport	**(United States) No. 47 Nolasport**	(United States) No. 7 Nolasport
3	R1	(United States) Sonoma	(United States) Nicolai Elghanayan (Norway) Mads Siljehaug	(United States) Jarett Andretti (United States) Colin Mullan	**(United States) Jason Hart** **(United States) Matt Travis**	(United States) Zac Anderson (United States) Sean Gibbons
3	R2	(United States) Sonoma	(United States) No. 71 Marco Polo Motorsports	**(United States) No. 71 Marco Polo Motorsports**	(United States) No. 21 Flying Lizard Motorsports	(United States) No. 16 Rearden Racing
3	R2	(United States) Sonoma	(United States) Nicolai Elghanayan (Norway) Mads Siljehaug	**(United States) Nicolai Elghanayan** **(Norway) Mads Siljehaug**	(United States) Michael Dinan (United States) Robby Foley	(United States) John Allen (United States) Kris Wilson
3	R3	(United States) Sonoma		(United States) No. 25 CCR Team TFB	**(United States) No. 21 Flying Lizard Motorsports**	(United States) No. 7 Nolasport
3	R3	(United States) Sonoma		(United States) Tim Barber (United States) Cole Ciraulo	**(United States) Michael Dinan** **(United States) Robby Foley**	(United States) Zac Anderson (United States) Sean Gibbons
4	R1	(United States) Road America	(United States) No. 71 Marco Polo Motorsports	(Canada) No. 28 ST Racing	**(United States) No. 82 BimmerWorld Racing**	(United States) No. 7 Nolasport
4	R1	(United States) Road America	(United States) Nicolai Elghanayan (Norway) Mads Siljehaug	(United States) Harry Gottsacker (Canada) Nick Wittmer	**(United States) Bill Auberlen** **(United States) James Walker Jr.**	(United States) Zac Anderson (United States) Sean Gibbons
4	R2	(United States) Road America	(Canada) No. 28 ST Racing	**(United States) No. 21 Flying Lizard Motorsports**	(United States) No. 71 Marco Polo Motorsports	(United States) No. 16 Rearden Racing
4	R2	(United States) Road America	(United States) Harry Gottsacker (Canada) Nick Wittmer	**(United States) Michael Dinan** **(United States) Robby Foley**	(United States) Nicolai Elghanayan (Norway) Mads Siljehaug	(United States) John Allen (United States) Kris Wilson
4	R3	(United States) Road America		(United States) No. 21 Flying Lizard Motorsports	**(United States) No. 71 Marco Polo Motorsports**	(United States) No. 7 Nolasport
4	R3	(United States) Road America		(United States) Michael Dinan (United States) Robby Foley	**(United States) Nicolai Elghanayan** **(Norway) Mads Siljehaug**	(United States) Zac Anderson (United States) Sean Gibbons
5	R1	(United States) Austin	(Canada) No. 28 ST Racing	**(United States) No. 51 Team Panoz Racing**	(United States) No. 21 Flying Lizard Motorsports	(United States) No. 7 Nolasport
5	R1	(United States) Austin	(United States) Harry Gottsacker (Canada) Nick Wittmer	**(Canada) Roman De Angelis** **(United States) Parker Chase**	(United States) Michael Dinan (United States) Robby Foley	(United States) Zac Anderson (United States) Sean Gibbons
5	R2	(United States) Austin	(United States) No. 2 GMG Racing	(Canada) No. 28 ST Racing	**(United States) No. 2 GMG Racing**	(United States) No. 3 Motorsport USA
5	R2	(United States) Austin	(United States) Jason Bell (United States) Andrew Davis	(United States) Harry Gottsacker (Canada) Nick Wittmer	**(United States) Jason Bell** **(United States) Andrew Davis**	(United States) Michael McAleenan (United States) Dan Rogers
6	R1	(United States) Indianapolis	(United States) No. 47 Nolasport	(United States) No. 51 Team Panoz Racing	**(United States) No. 37 RS1**	(United States) No. 46 Nolasport
6	R1	(United States) Indianapolis	(United States) Jason Hart (United States) Matt Travis	(Canada) Roman De Angelis (United States) Parker Chase	**(United States) Charlie Belluardo** **(Belgium) Jan Heylen**	(United States) David Walker (United States) Russell Walker
6	R2	(United States) Indianapolis	(United States) No. 33 Notlad Racing by RS1	(United States) No. 36 Andretti Autosport	**(United States) No. 21 Flying Lizard Motorsports**	(United States) No. 46 Nolasport
6	R2	(United States) Indianapolis	(United States) Joe Dalton (United States) Patrick Gallagher	(United States) Jarett Andretti (United States) Colin Mullan	**(United States) Michael Dinan** **(United States) Robby Foley**	(United States) David Walker (United States) Russell Walker

=== Sprint ===
Round		Circuit	Pole position	Pro Winners	Am Winners
1	R1	(United States) Austin	(United States) No. 12 Ian Lacy Racing	**(United States) No. 12 Ian Lacy Racing**	(United States) No. 210 Flying Lizard Motorsports
1	R1	(United States) Austin	(United States) Drew Staveley	**(United States) Drew Staveley**	(United States) Michael Dinan
1	R2	(United States) Austin		**(United States) No. 10 Blackdog Speed Shop**	(United States) No. 59 Rearden Racing
1	R2	(United States) Austin		**(United States) Michael Cooper**	(United States) Paul Terry
2	R1	(United States) Virginia	(United States) No. 66 TRG - The Racers Group	(United States) **No. 66 TRG - The Racers Group**	(United States) No. 210 Flying Lizard Motorsports
2	R1	(United States) Virginia	(United States) Spencer Pumpelly	**(United States) Spencer Pumpelly**	(United States) Michael Dinan
2	R2	(United States) Virginia		**(United States) No. 10 Blackdog Speed Shop**	(United States) No. 210 Flying Lizard Motorsports
2	R2	(United States) Virginia		**(United States) Michael Cooper**	(United States) Michael Dinan
2	R3	(United States) Virginia		**(United States) No. 10 Blackdog Speed Shop**	(United States) No. 210 Flying Lizard Motorsports
2	R3	(United States) Virginia		**(United States) Michael Cooper**	(United States) Michael Dinan
3	R1	(United States) Sonoma	(United States) No. 66 TRG - The Racer's Group	**(United States) No. 10 Blackdog Speed Shop**	(United States) No. 210 Flying Lizard Motorsports
3	R1	(United States) Sonoma	(United States) Spencer Pumpelly	**(United States) Michael Cooper**	(United States) Michael Dinan
3	R2	(United States) Sonoma		**(United States) No. 10 Blackdog Speed Shop**	(United States) No. 59 Rearden Racing
3	R2	(United States) Sonoma		**(United States) Michael Cooper**	(United States) Paul Terry
3	R3	(United States) Sonoma		**(United States) No. 10 Blackdog Speed Shop**	(United States) No. 191 Rearden Racing
3	R3	(United States) Sonoma		**(United States) Michael Cooper**	(United States) Jeff Burton
4	R1	(United States) Road America	(United States) No. 66 TRG - The Racer's Group (Note: Qualifying at Road America was cancelled due to heavy rain, so the grid was set on times from Practice 2)	**(United States) No. 10 Blackdog Speed Shop**	(United States) No. 210 Flying Lizard Motorsports
4	R1	(United States) Road America	(United States) Spencer Pumpelly	**(United States) Michael Cooper**	(United States) Michael Dinan
4	R2	(United States) Road America		**(United States) No. 66 TRG - The Racer's Group**	(United States) No. 210 Flying Lizard Motorsports
4	R2	(United States) Road America		**(United States) Spencer Pumpelly**	(United States) Michael Dinan
4	R3	(United States) Road America		**(United States) No. 10 Blackdog Speed Shop**	(United States) No. 210 Flying Lizard Motorsports
4	R3	(United States) Road America		**(United States) Michael Cooper**	(United States) Michael Dinan
5	R1	(United States) Austin	(United States) No. 10 Blackdog Speed Shop	**(United States) No. 10 Blackdog Speed Shop**	(United States) No. 210 Flying Lizard Motorsports
5	R1	(United States) Austin	(United States) Michael Cooper	**(United States) Michael Cooper**	(United States) Michael Dinan
5	R2	(United States) Austin		**(United States) No. 10 Blackdog Speed Shop**	(United States) No. 59 Rearden Racing
5	R2	(United States) Austin		**(United States) Michael Cooper**	(United States) Paul Terry
5	R3	(United States) Austin		**(United States) No. 10 Blackdog Speed Shop**	(United States) No. 210 Flying Lizard Motorsports
5	R3	(United States) Austin		**(United States) Michael Cooper**	(United States) Michael Dinan
6	R1	(United States) Indianapolis	(United States) No. 48 Nolasport	**(United States) No. 12 Ian Lacy Racing**	(United States) No. 48 Nolasport
6	R1	(United States) Indianapolis	(United States) Matt Travis	**(United States) Drew Staveley**	(United States) Matt Travis
6	R2	(United States) Indianapolis		**(United States) No. 12 Ian Lacy Racing**	(United States) No. 210 Flying Lizard Motorsports
6	R2	(United States) Indianapolis		**(United States) Drew Staveley**	(United States) Michael Dinan

== Championship standings ==
Scoring system

Championship points are awarded for the first ten positions in each race. Entries are required to complete 75% of the winning car's race distance in order to be classified and earn points. Individual drivers are required to participate for a minimum of 25 minutes in order to earn championship points in any SprintX race.

Position	**1st**	**2nd**	**3rd**	**4th**	**5th**	**6th**	**7th**	**8th**	**9th**	**10th**
Points	25	18	15	12	10	8	6	4	2	1

=== Driver's championships ===
==== SprintX ====
Pos.	Driver	Team	AUS1 (United States)		VIR (United States)			SON (United States)			ELK (United States)			AUS2 (United States)		IMS (United States)		Points
Pos.	Driver	Team	RC1	RC2	RC1	RC2	RC3	RC1	RC2	RC3	RC1	RC2	RC3	RC1	RC2	RC1	RC2	Points
Silver Cup
1	(United States) Jarett Andretti (United States) Colin Mullan	(United States) Andretti Autosport	4	4	Ret	11	3	3	5	18	4	4	13	3	3	5	3	251
2	(United States) Harry Gottsacker (Canada) Nick Wittmer	(Canada) ST Racing	7	3	**7**	10	9	8	8	12	2	**Ret**	4	**15**	**2**	**3**	4	245
3	(United States) Jon Miller (Canada) Samantha Tan	(Canada) ST Racing	12	11	14	**9**	5	18	7	14	13	7	11	14	21	14	5	190
4	(United States) Nicolai Elghanayan (Norway) Mads Siljehaug	(United States) Marco Polo Motorsports	**6**	**7**	Ret	12	11	**20**	**1**	20	**5**	3	1	DNS	11	9	Ret	186
5	(United States) Tim Barber (United States) Cole Ciraulo	(United States) CCR Team TFB	15	12	Ret	7	6	15	21	6	6	11	7	17	16	8	6	179
6	(United States) Toby Grahovec (United States) Chandler Hull	(United States) Classic BMW			15	5	12	21	10	13	17	13	17	12	20	Ret	20	135
7	(United States) Parker Chase (Canada) Roman De Angelis	(United States) Team Panoz Racing												1	Ret	2	**11**	60
8	(United States) Ryan Dexter (United States) Cody Ware	(United States) Dexter Racing						5	14	7								44
9	(United States) John Dubets (United States) Austen Smith	(United States) Nolasport	20	24														16
Pro-Am Cup
1	(United States) Michael Dinan (United States) Robby Foley	(United States) Flying Lizard Motorsports	8	2	5	6	13	2	**2**	1	**Ret**	**1**	2	2	DNS	17	1	232
2	(United States) Jason Hart (United States) Matt Travis	(United States) Nolasport	**1**	1	13	4	1	**1**	9	2	8	8	3	8	7	**7**	2	230
3	(United States) Bill Auberlen (United States) James Walker	(United States) BimmerWorld Racing	Ret	13	**1**	**1**	2	11	16	11	1	2	10	5	8	6	8	183
4	(United States) Jason Bell (United States) Andrew Davis	(United States) GMG Racing	5	**9**	3	3	Ret	4	6	4	18	6	6	6	**1**	18	10	172
5	(United States) Kenton Koch (United States) Bryan Putt	(United States) BSport Racing	14	8	8	2	Ret	6	3	3	3	5	5	Ret	6	4	19	161
6	(United States) Charlie Belluardo (Belgium) Jan Heylen	(United States) RS1	2	5	4	13	17	19	23	8	DNS	18	16	7	4	1	14	129
7	(United States) Greg Liefooghe (United States) Sean Quinlan	(United States) Stephen Cameron Racing	18	10	2	DNS	4	7	4	10	Ret	12	Ret	Ret	9	Ret	21	80
8	(United States) Joe Dalton (United States) Patrick Gallagher	(United States) RS1	17	Ret	9	16	10	Ret	Ret	Ret	7	10	8	9	12	21	**7**	72
9	(United States) Michael Cooper (United States) Erin Vogel	(United States) Flying Lizard Motorsports	10	17	17	18	7	14	12	19	12	9	Ret	11	13	20	13	69
10	(United States) Jeff Burton (United States) Vesko Kosarov	(United States) Rearden Racing	16	Ret	6	14	8	9	18	5	DNS	DNS	9	Ret	10			57
11	(United States) Ian James (United States) Matthew Keegan	(United States) Team Panoz Racing									16	16	DNS	**4**	5	19	9	44
12	(United States) Andy Lee (United States) Elias Sabo	(United States) GMG Racing	13	16				10	15	DNS								18
13	(Netherlands) Jeroen Bleekemolen (United States) Tim Pappas	(United States) Black Swan Racing	3	18														15
14	(United States) Ben Anderson (United States) Warren Dexter	(United States) Dexter Racing	21	6										13	Ret			14
15	(United States) Craig Lyons (United States) Spencer Pumpelly	(United States) TRG - The Racers Group	11	26														6
	(United States) Toby Grahovec (United States) John Rader	(United States) Classic BMW	24	22														0
	(Serbia) Marko Radisic (Canada) Karl Wittmer	(United States) Precision Driving Tech	25	19														0
	(United States) Matt Fassnacht (United States) Christian Szymczak	(United States) Murillo Racing	Ret	25														0
Am Cup
1	(United States) Zac Anderson (United States) Sean Gibbons	(United States) Nolasport	9	**14**	12	**15**	14	12	13	9	**9**	15	12	10	17			284
2	(United States) Derek DeBoer (United States) James Rappaport	(United States) TRG - The Racers Group	22	21	11	19	15	22	20	16	14	19	15	18	19	13	18	196
3	(United States) David Walker (United States) Russell Walker	(United States) Nolasport						16	19	17	10	Ret	18	16	**15**	10	**12**	155
4	(United States) John Allen (United States) Kris Wilson	(United States) Rearden Racing			**10**	8	Ret	17	**11**	15	11	14	Ret					145
5	(United States) Michael McAleenan (United States) Dan Rogers	(United States) Motorsport USA	23	20				Ret	17	21				**19**	14	**16**	15	115
6	(Canada) Tom Collingwood (United States) John Tecce	(United States) BGB Motorsports Group			16	17	16				15	**17**	14			12	Ret	100
7	(United States) Michael McGrath (United States) Alex Welch	(United States) GMG Racing	**19**	15				**13**	22	DNS								62
8	(United States) Todd Clarke (United States) Ty Clarke	(United States) Motorsport USA						23	Ret	22				Ret	18	11	16	61
9	(United States) Dieter-Heinz Kijora (United States) Vincent Piemonte	(United States) Marco Polo Motorsports														15	17	22
10	(United States) Anthony Geraci (United States) Richard Gollinello	(Canada) Compass Racing	Ret	23														10
Pos.	Driver	Team	AUS1 (United States)		VIR (United States)			SON (United States)			ELK (United States)			AUS2 (United States)		IMS (United States)		Points

Key
Colour	Result
Gold	Race winner
Silver	2nd place
Bronze	3rd place
Green	Points finish
Blue	Non-points finish
Blue	Non-classified finish (NC)
Purple	Did not finish (Ret)
Black	Disqualified (DSQ)
Black	Excluded (EX)
White	Did not start (DNS)
White	Race cancelled (C)
White	Withdrew (WD)
Blank	Did not participate

**Bold** – Pole
Italics – Fastest Lap

==== Sprint ====
Pos.	Driver	Team	AUS1 (United States)		VIR (United States)			SON (United States)			ELK (United States)			AUS2 (United States)			IMS (United States)		Points
Pos.	Driver	Team	RC1	RC2	RC1	RC2	RC3	RC1	RC2	RC3	RC1	RC2	RC3	RC1	RC2	RC3	RC1	RC2	Points
Pro Cup
1	(United States) Michael Cooper	(United States) Blackdog Speed Shop	3	1	14	1	1	1	1	1	1	2	1	1	1	1	2	3	354
2	(United States) Drew Staveley	(United States) Ian Lacy Racing	**1**	3	3	4	4	3	2	3	10	5	3	**2**	2	2	**1**	1	276
3	(United States) Spencer Pumpelly	(United States) TRG - The Racers Group	2	4	**1**	2	2	**2**	3	2	**2**	1	2						203
4	(United States) Jarett Andretti	(United States) Andretti Autosport	6	2	2	3	3	4	4	4							4	5	144
5	(United States) James Pesek	(United States) PF Racing			6	7	5												32
6	(United States) Toby Grahovec	(United States) Classic BMW	9	5															20
	(United States) Greg Liefooghe	(United States) Stephen Cameron Racing					DSQ												0
Am Cup
1	(United States) Michael Dinan	(United States) Flying Lizard Motorsports	4	7	**4**	5	6	**5**	6	9	3	3	4	3		3	12	2	323
2	(United States) Paul Terry	(United States) Rearden Racing	**5**	6	10	8	10	6	5	8	**4**	6	6	**7**	3	4	5	4	268
3	(United States) Jeff Burton	(United States) Rearden Racing	8	9	8	9	9	7	7	5	13	Ret	7	4	4	6			176
4	(United States) Jason Bell	(United States) GMG Racing	10	11	13	10	8	11	10	6	8	9	10	6	5	Ret	8	8	146
5	(United States) Sean Quinlan	(United States) Stephen Cameron Racing	Ret	10	7	12	WD	8	9	7	7	8	9	5	7	Ret	6	11	140
6	(United States) Jeff Courtney	(United States) RecStuff Racing	12	12	5	6	7				6	7	8				9	6	123
7	(United States) Tony Gaples	(United States) Blackdog Speed Shop	7	8							5	4	5	Ret	6	5			108
8	(United States) Frank Gannett	(United States) Ian Lacy Racing	13	Ret	11	11	11	9	11	10	9	11	12	8	Ret		10	9	84
9	(United States) Mark Klenin	(United States) KPR	Ret	Ret	12	Ret	Ret	10	8	11	Ret	Ret	DNS	10	Ret				34
10	(United States) Jason Hall	(United States) Nolasport									DNS	10	11	9	8	7			34
11	(United States) Christopher Gumprecht	(United States) C.G. Racing Inc.			9	13					11	12	DNS				11	10	30
12	(United States) Matt Travis	(United States) NOLASPORT															**1**	DNS	25
13	(United States) Erin Vogel	(United States) Blackdog Speed Shop															7	7	24
14	(United States) Tim Pappas	(United States) Black Swan Racing	11	DNS															8
15	(Canada) Fred Roberts	(United States) RecStuff Racing	14	13															6
16	(Serbia) Marko Radisic	(United States) Precision Driving Tech	Ret	14															2
17	(United States) Ray Mason	(Canada) Compass Racing									12	Ret	DNS						2
Pos.	Driver	Team	AUS1 (United States)		VIR (United States)			SON (United States)			ELK (United States)			AUS2 (United States)			IMS (United States)		Points

=== Team's championships ===
==== SprintX ====
Pos.	Team	Manufacturer	AUS1 (United States)		VIR (United States)			SON (United States)			ELK (United States)			AUS2 (United States)		IMS (United States)		Points
Pos.	Team	Manufacturer	RC1	RC2	RC1	RC2	RC3	RC1	RC2	RC3	RC1	RC2	RC3	RC1	RC2	RC1	RC2	Points
Silver Cup
1	(Canada) ST Racing	BMW	7	3	**7**	**9**	5	8	7	12	2	**7**	4	**14**	**2**	**3**	4	274
2	(United States) Andretti Autosport	McLaren	4	4	Ret	11	3	3	5	18	4	4	13	3	3	5	3	257
3	(United States) Marco Polo Motorsports	KTM	**6**	**7**	Ret	12	11	**20**	**1**	20	**7**	3	1	DNS	11	9	Ret	196
4	(United States) CCR Team TFB	BMW	15	12	Ret	7	6	15	21	6	6	11	7	17	16	8	6	190
5	(United States) Classic BMW	BMW			15	5	12	21	10	13	17	13	17	12	20	Ret	20	150
6	(United States) Team Panoz Racing	Panoz												1	Ret	1	**17**	62
7	(United States) Dexter Racing	Ginetta						5	14	7								46
8	(United States) Nolasport	Porsche	20	24														20
Pro-Am Cup
1	(United States) Flying Lizard Motorsports	Aston Martin; McLaren	8	2	5	6	7	2	**2**	1	**12**	**1**	2	2	13	17	1	250
2	(United States) Nolasport	Porsche	**1**	1	13	4	1	**1**	9	2	8	8	3	8	7	**7**	2	232
3	(United States) BimmerWorld Racing	BMW	Ret	13	**1**	**1**	2	11	16	11	1	2	10	5	8	6	8	189
4	(United States) RS1	Porsche; Aston Martin	2	5	4	13	10	19	23	8	7	10	8	7	4	1	**7**	178
5	(United States) GMG Racing	Porsche; Audi	5	**9**	3	3	Ret	4	6	4	18	6	6	6	**1**	18	10	172
6	(United States) BSport Racing	Aston Martin	14	8	8	2	Ret	6	3	3	3	5	5	Ret	6	4	19	169
7	(United States) Stephen Cameron Racing	BMW	18	10	2	DNS	4	7	4	10	Ret	12	Ret	Ret	9	Ret	21	88
8	(United States) Rearden Racing	Aston Martin	16	Ret	6	14	8	9	18	5	DNS	DNS	9	Ret	10			64
9	(United States) Team Panoz Racing	Panoz									16	16	DNS	**4**	5	19	9	61
10	(United States) Black Swan Racing	Porsche	3	18														17
11	(United States) Dexter Racing	Ginetta	21	6														13
12	(United States) TRG - The Racers Group	Porsche	11	26														8
13	(United States) Precision Driving Tech	BMW	25	19														1
	(United States) Classic BMW	BMW	24	22														0
	(United States) Murillo Racing	Mercedes-AMG	Ret	25														0
Am Cup
1	(United States) Nolasport	Porsche	9	**14**	12	**15**	14	12	13	9	**9**	15	12	10	**15**	10	**12**	337
2	(United States) TRG - The Racers Group	Porsche	22	21	11	19	15	22	20	16	14	19	15	18	19	13	18	216
3	(United States) Rearden Racing	Mercedes-AMG			**10**	8	Ret	17	**11**	15	11	14	Ret					151
4	(United States) Motorsport USA	McLaren	23	20				23	17	21				19	14	**11**	15	140
5	(United States) BGB Motorsports Group	Porsche			16	17	17				15	**17**	14			12	Ret	102
6	(United States) GMG Racing	Audi	**19**	15				**13**	22	DNS								64
7	(Canada) Compass Racing	McLaren	Ret	23														10
Pos.	Team	Manufacturer	AUS1 (United States)		VIR (United States)			SON (United States)			ELK (United States)			AUS2 (United States)		IMS (United States)		Points

==== Sprint ====
Pos.	Team	Manufacturer	AUS1 (United States)		VIR (United States)			SON (United States)			ELK (United States)			AUS2 (United States)			IMS (United States)		Points
Pos.	Team	Manufacturer	RC1	RC2	RC1	RC2	RC3	RC1	RC2	RC3	RC1	RC2	RC3	RC1	RC2	RC3	RC1	RC2	Points
Pro Cup
1	(United States) Blackdog Speed Shop	McLaren	3	1	14	1	1	1	1	1	1	2	1	1	1	1	2	3	354
2	(United States) Ian Lacy Racing	Ford	**1**	3	3	4	4	3	2	3	10	5	3	**2**	2	2	**1**	1	276
3	(United States) TRG - The Racers Group	Porsche	2	4	**1**	2	2	**2**	3	2	**2**	1	2						203
4	(United States) Andretti Autosport	McLaren	6	2	2	3	3	4	4	4							4	5	144
5	(United States) PF Racing	Ford			6	7	5												32
6	(United States) Classic BMW	BMW	9	5															20
	(United States) Stephen Cameron Racing	BMW					DSQ												0
Am Cup
1	(United States) Flying Lizard Motorsports	Aston Martin	4	7	**4**	5	6	**5**	6	9									173
2	(United States) Rearden Racing	Aston Martin	**5**	**6**	10	8	10	6	5	5									150
3	(United States) GMG Racing	Porsche	10	11	13	10	8	11	10	6									89
4	(United States) Stephen Cameron Racing	BMW	Ret	10	7	12	WD	8	9	7									77
5	(United States) RecStuff Racing	Aston Martin; Mercedes-AMG	12	12	5	6	7												70
6	(United States) Ian Lacy Racing	Ford	13	Ret	11	11	11	9	11	10									64
7	(United States) KPR	SIN	Ret	Ret	12	Ret	Ret	10	8	11									39
8	(United States) Blackdog Speed Shop	McLaren	7	8															30
9	(United States) C.G. Racing Inc.	Mercedes-AMG			9	13													16
10	(United States) Black Swan Racing	Porsche	11	DNS															10
11	(United States) Precision Driving Tech	BMW	Ret	14															6
Pos.	Team	Manufacturer	AUS1 (United States)		VIR (United States)			SON (United States)			ELK (United States)			AUS2 (United States)			IMS (United States)		Points

== See also ==
- 2020 GT World Challenge America
