= 2022 Le Mans Cup =

2022 European motorsport series

The 2022 Le Mans Cup, known as the 2022 Michelin Le Mans Cup under sponsorship, was the seventh season of the Le Mans Cup. It began on 16 April at the Circuit Paul Ricard and ended on 15 October at the Algarve International Circuit. The series is open to Le Mans Prototypes in the LMP3 class, and grand tourer sports cars in the GT3 class.

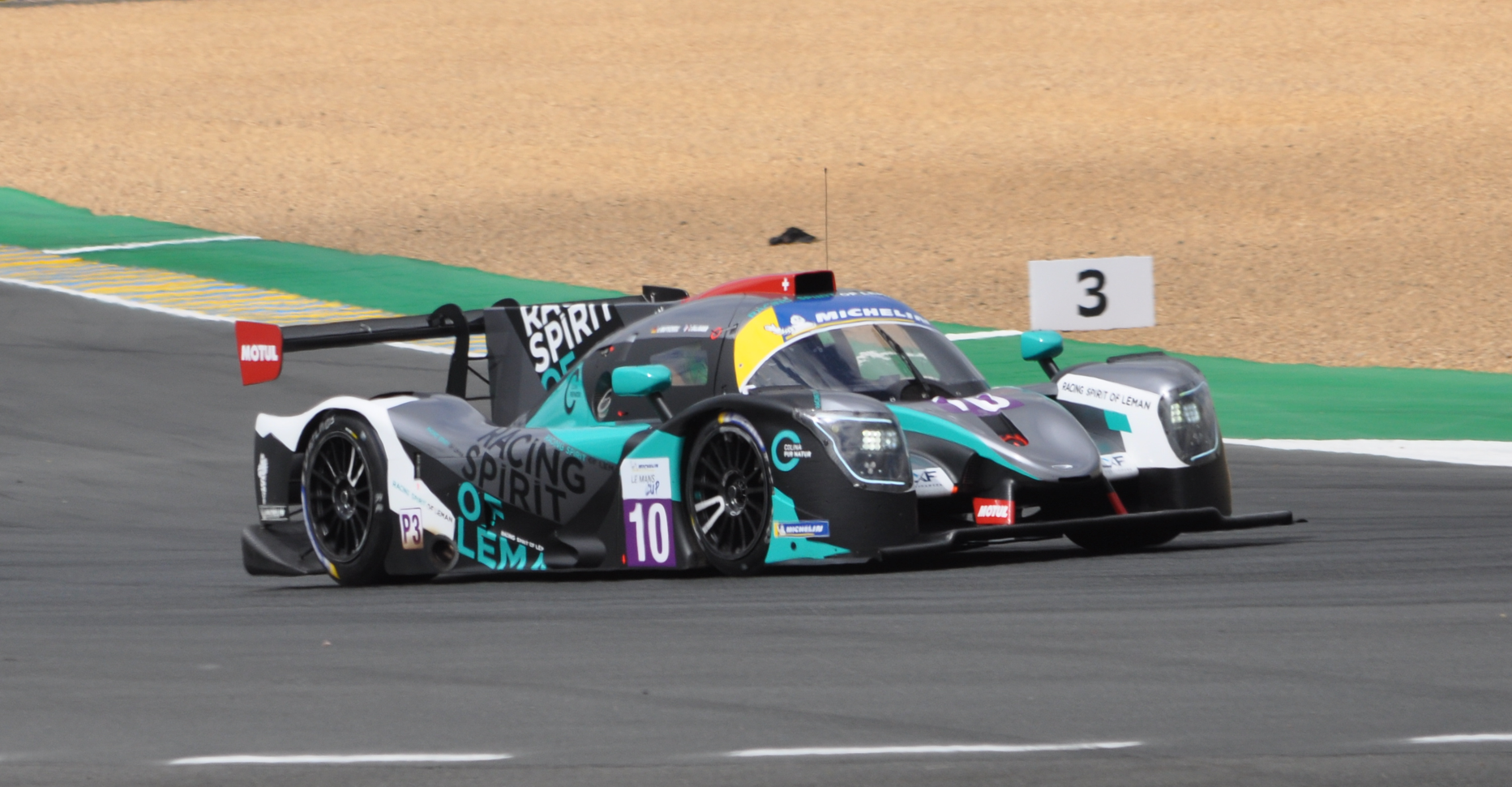
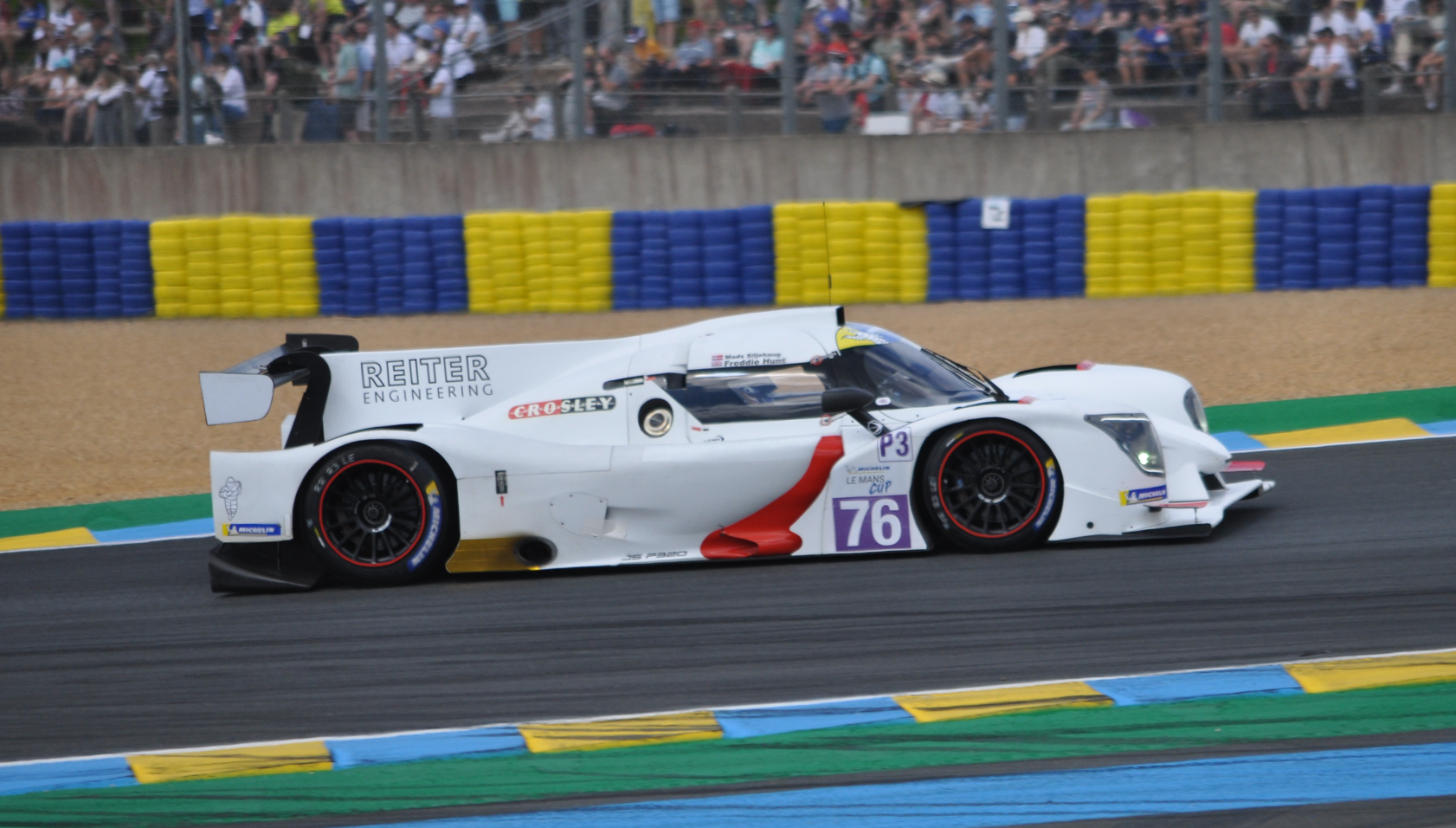
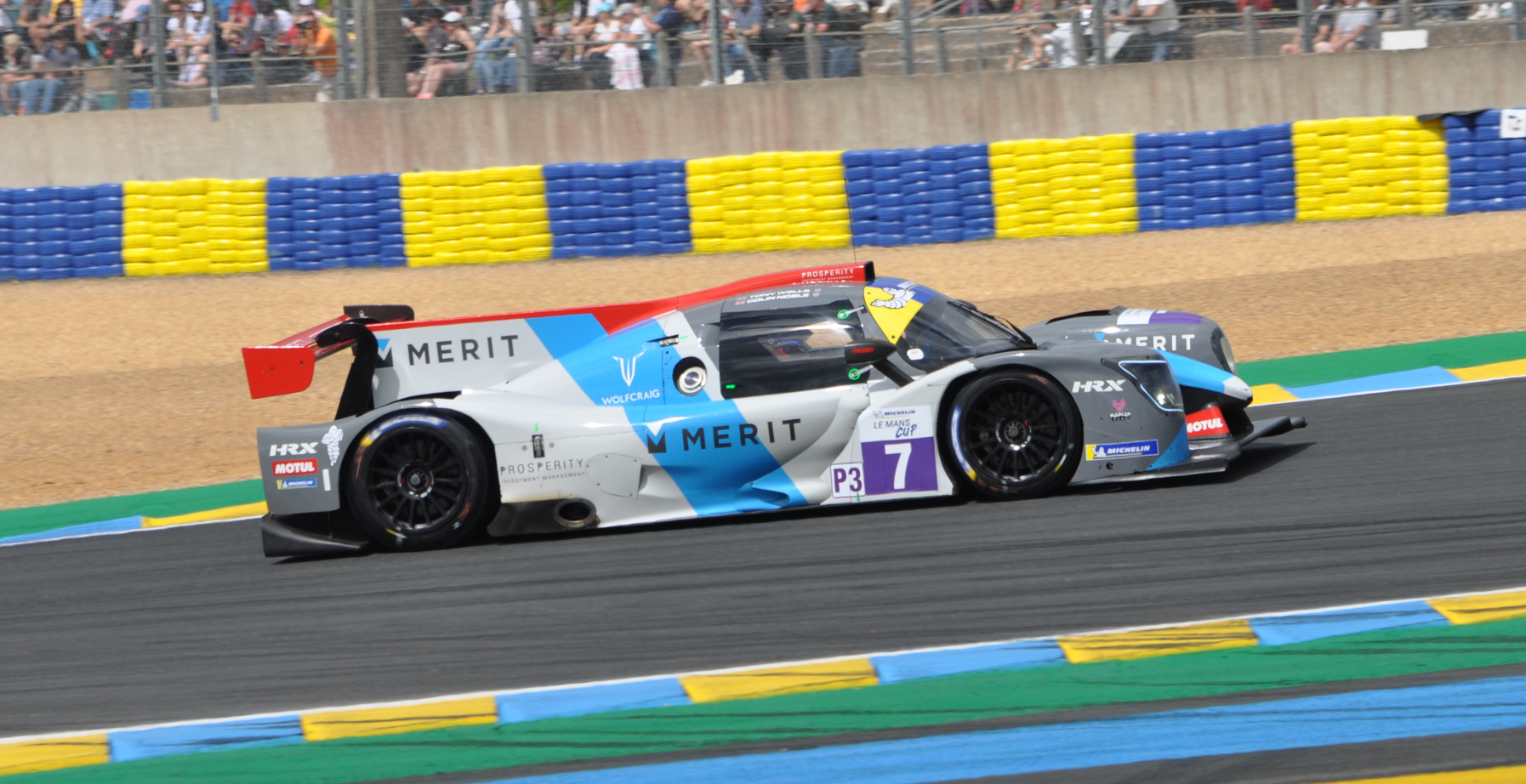
Racing Spirit of Léman, Tom Dillmann and Alexander Mattschull (left) won both LMP3 championships, Reiter Engineering, Freddie Hunt and Mads Siljehaug (centre) finished second in both LMP3 standings and Nielsen Racing, Colin Noble and Anthony Wells (right) finished third in the championship.
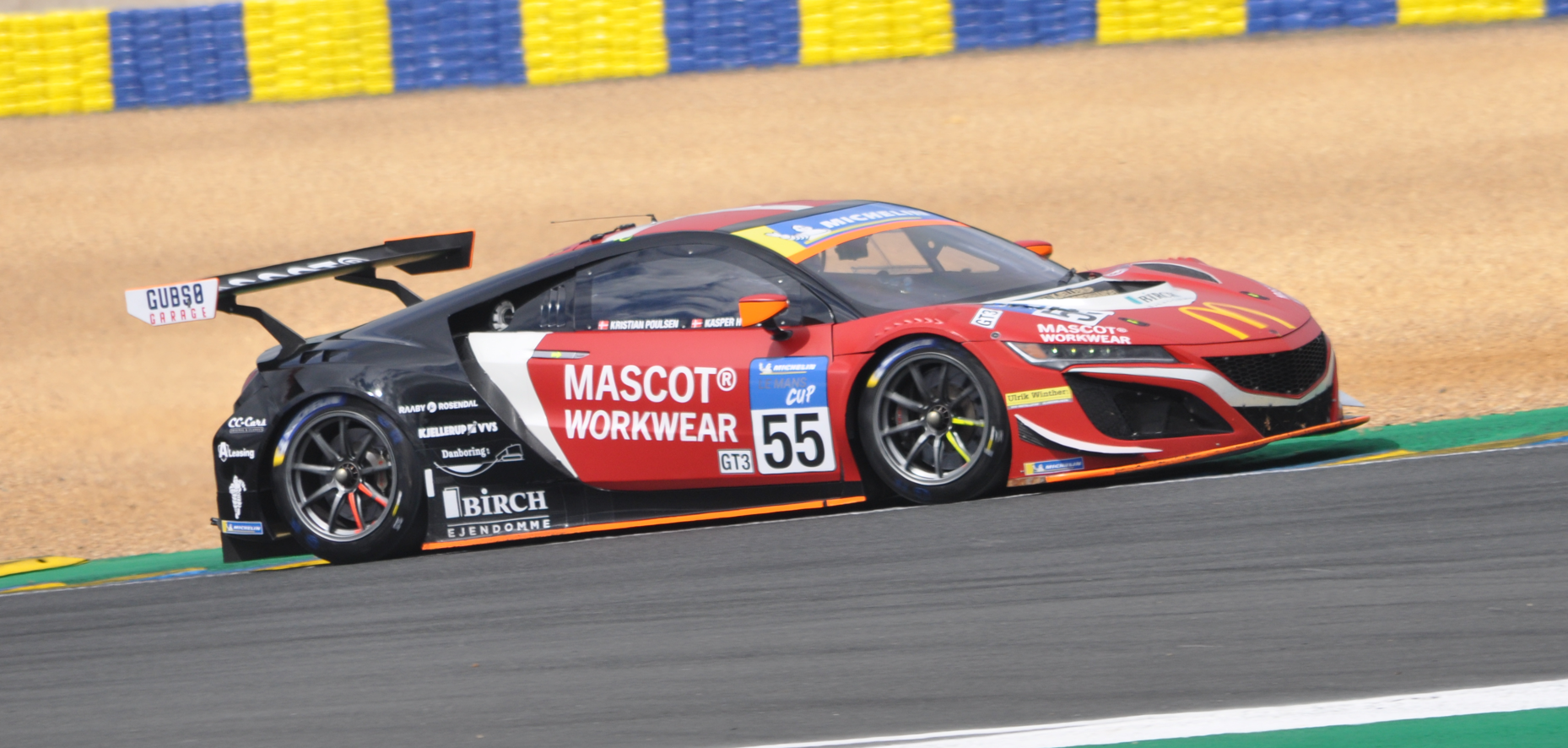
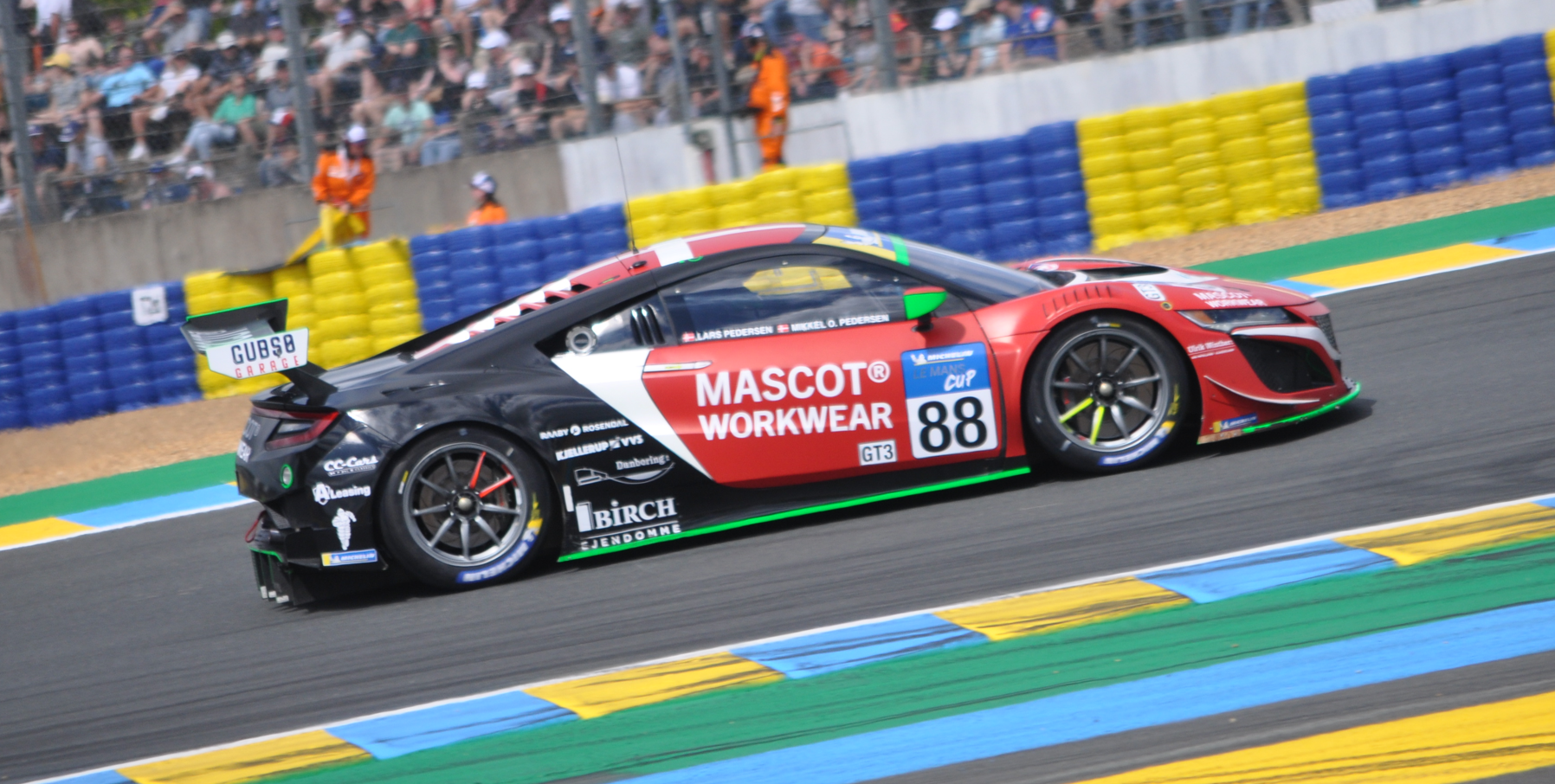
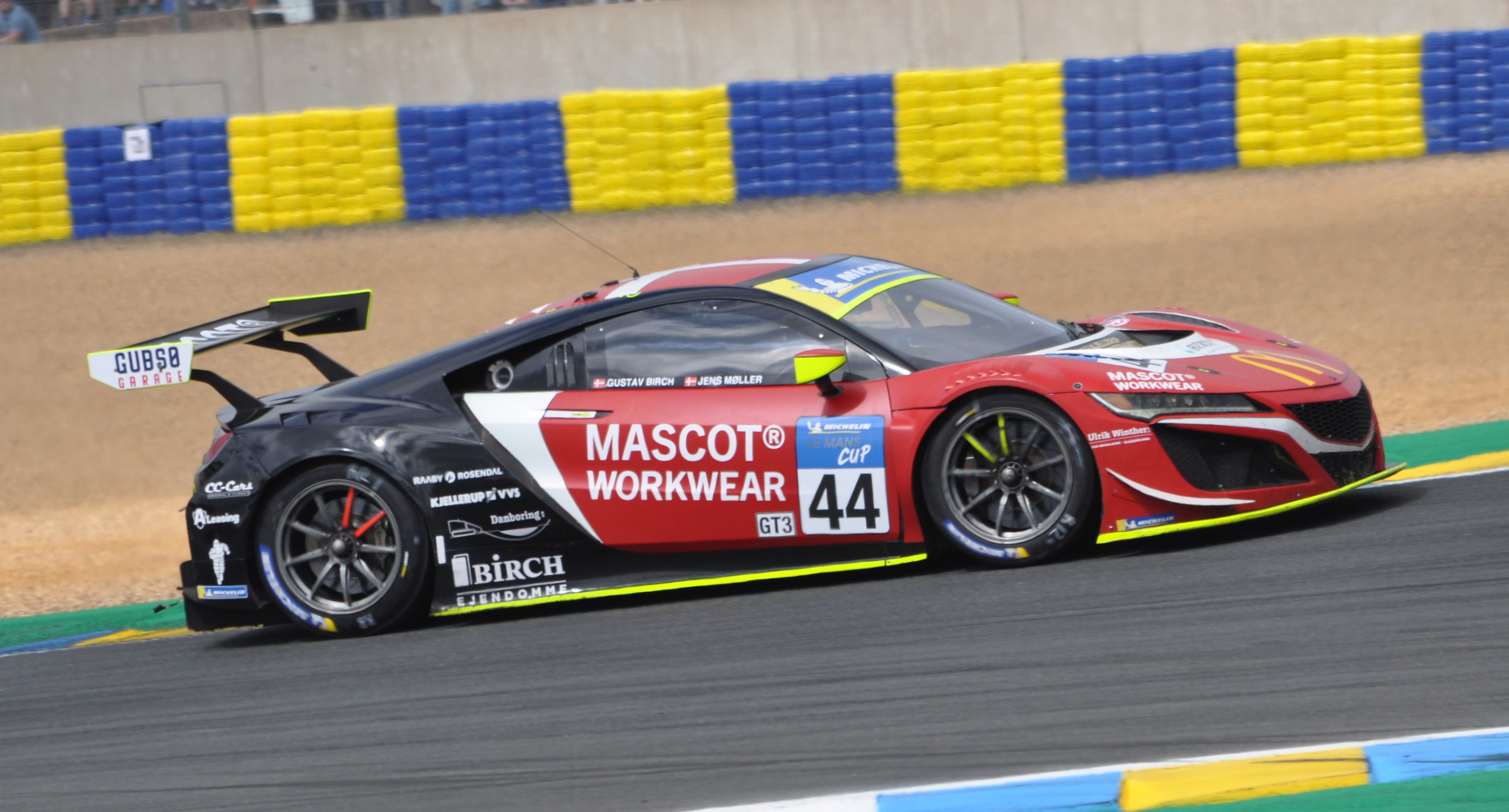
GMB Motorsport, Kasper H. Jensen and Kristian Poulsen (left) won both GT3s championships, other GMB Motorsport drivers Lars Engelbreckt Pedersen and #44 duo Gustav Birch and Jens Reno Møller finished second and third respectively.

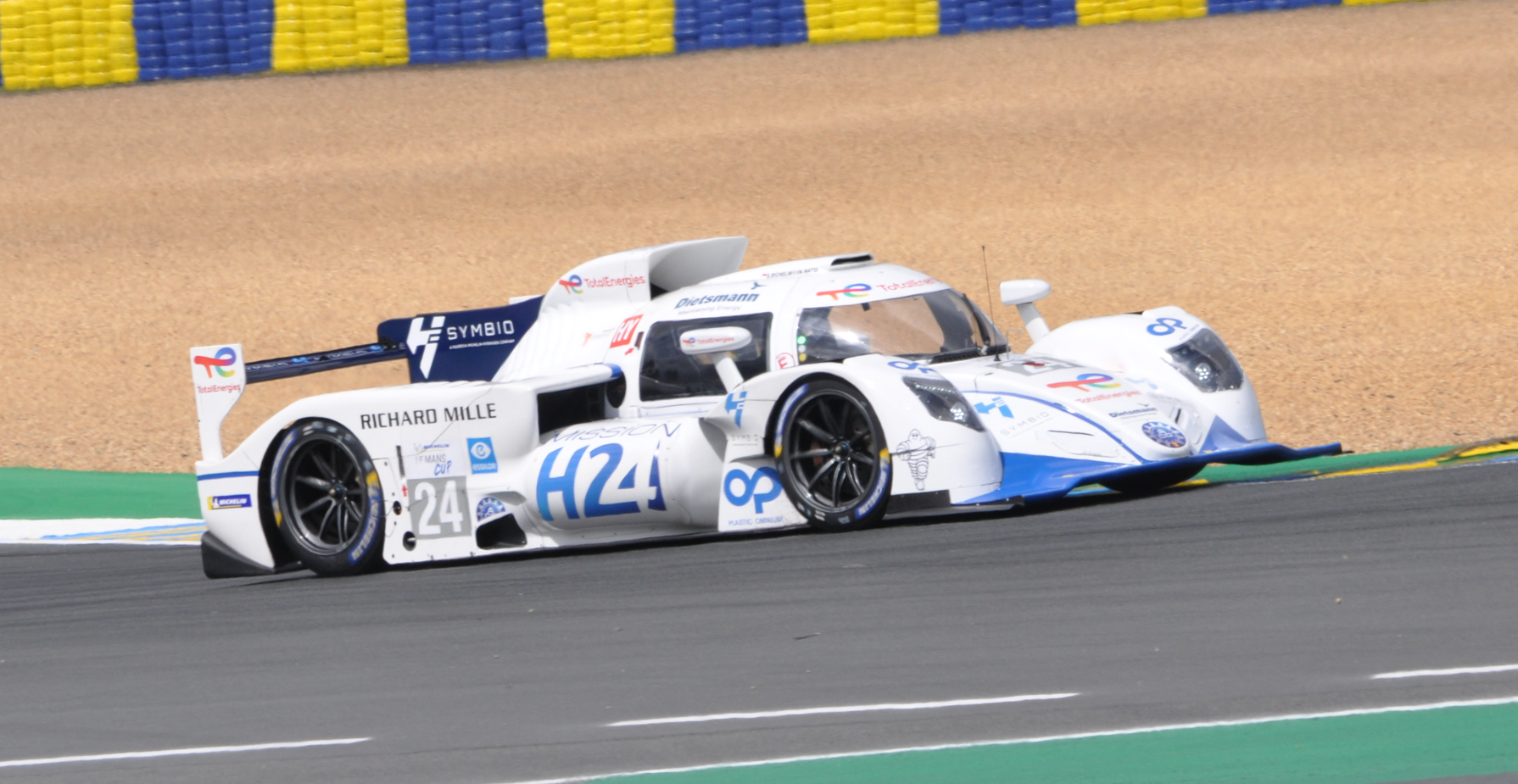
The hydrogen-electric H24 (pictured at Le Mans) made its competitive debut at Imola.

== Calendar ==
The 2022 calendar was unveiled on 17 September 2021.

Round	Circuit	Location	Race length	Date
1	(France) Circuit Paul Ricard	Le Castellet, France	1 hour 50 mins	16 April
2	(Italy) Imola Circuit	Imola, Italy	1 hour 50 mins	14 May
3	(France) Circuit de la Sarthe	Le Mans, France	55 minutes	9 June
3	(France) Circuit de la Sarthe	Le Mans, France	55 minutes	11 June
4	(Italy) Monza Circuit	Monza, Italy	1 hour 50 mins	2 July
5	(Belgium) Circuit de Spa-Francorchamps	Spa, Belgium	1 hour 50 mins	24 September
6	(Portugal) Algarve International Circuit	Portimão, Portugal	1 hour 50 mins	16 October

== Entries ==
=== LMP3 ===
All cars in the LMP3 class used the 2020 spec Nissan VK56DE 5.6L V8 engine and Michelin tyres. The new-for-2022 race length of 1h 50m removes the need for the additional mandatory stop that was introduced in 2020 to mitigate unexpected higher fuel consumption.

Entrant/Team	Chassis	No.	Drivers	Rounds
(United Kingdom) United Autosports	Ligier JS P320	2	(United Kingdom) Max Lynn	All
(United Kingdom) United Autosports	Ligier JS P320	2	(United Kingdom) Shaun Lynn	1–3, 5–6
(United Kingdom) United Autosports	Ligier JS P320	2	(United Kingdom) Andrew Haddon	4
(United Kingdom) United Autosports	Ligier JS P320	21	(United States) James McGuire	3
(United Kingdom) United Autosports	Ligier JS P320	21	(United Kingdom) Guy Smith	3
(United Kingdom) United Autosports	Ligier JS P320	22	(Australia) Andres Latorre	All
(United Kingdom) United Autosports	Ligier JS P320	22	(Australia) Garnet Patterson	All
(United Kingdom) United Autosports	Ligier JS P320	23	(United Kingdom) Wayne Boyd	All
(United Kingdom) United Autosports	Ligier JS P320	23	(United States) John Schauerman	All
(United Kingdom) United Autosports	Ligier JS P320	32	(Brazil) Daniel Schneider	All
(United Kingdom) United Autosports	Ligier JS P320	32	(Netherlands) Kay van Berlo	1
(United Kingdom) United Autosports	Ligier JS P320	32	(United Kingdom) Andy Meyrick	2–6
(Luxembourg) DKR Engineering	Duqueine M30 - D08	3	(United States) Jon Brownson	All
(Luxembourg) DKR Engineering	Duqueine M30 - D08	3	(Germany) Laurents Hörr	All
(Luxembourg) DKR Engineering	Duqueine M30 - D08	14	(United Arab Emirates) Alexander Bukhantsov	All
(Luxembourg) DKR Engineering	Duqueine M30 - D08	14	(Australia) James Winslow	All
(United Kingdom) Nielsen Racing	Duqueine M30 - D08	4	(United Kingdom) Matthew Bell	All
(United Kingdom) Nielsen Racing	Duqueine M30 - D08	4	(United Kingdom) John Melsom	All
(United Kingdom) Nielsen Racing	Ligier JS P320	7	(United Kingdom) Colin Noble	All
(United Kingdom) Nielsen Racing	Ligier JS P320	7	(United Kingdom) Anthony Wells	All
(France) ANS Motorsport	Ligier JS P320	6	(Switzerland) Jonathan Brossard	All
(France) ANS Motorsport	Ligier JS P320	6	(France) Nicholas Schatz	All
(Austria) AT Racing Team	Ligier JS P320	9	(Austria) Alexander Talkanitsa Sr.	All
(Austria) AT Racing Team	Ligier JS P320	9	(Austria) Alexander Talkanitsa Jr.	1–2, 5–6
(Austria) AT Racing Team	Ligier JS P320	9	(United States) Gregory Huffaker	3
(Austria) AT Racing Team	Ligier JS P320	9	(France) Charles Milesi	4
(Switzerland) Racing Spirit of Léman	Ligier JS P320	10	(France) Tom Dillmann	All
(Switzerland) Racing Spirit of Léman	Ligier JS P320	10	(Germany) Alexander Mattschull	All
(Switzerland) Racing Spirit of Léman	Ligier JS P320	43	(United Kingdom) Josh Skelton	All
(Switzerland) Racing Spirit of Léman	Ligier JS P320	43	(France) Jacques Wolff	All
(Germany) WTM Racing	Duqueine M30 - D08	11	(Germany) Torsten Kratz	All
(Germany) WTM Racing	Duqueine M30 - D08	11	(Germany) Leonard Weiss	All
(Germany) Rinaldi Racing	Duqueine M30 - D08	66	(Germany) Daniel Keilwitz	All
(Germany) Rinaldi Racing	Duqueine M30 - D08	66	(Germany) Steve Parrow	All
(Switzerland) Haegeli by T2 Racing	Duqueine M30 - D08	13	(Switzerland) Pieder Decurtins	2–6
(Switzerland) Haegeli by T2 Racing	Duqueine M30 - D08	13	(Germany) Lars Kern	2
(Switzerland) Haegeli by T2 Racing	Duqueine M30 - D08	13	(Germany) Marc Basseng	3–6
(United Kingdom) RLR MSport	Ligier JS P320	15	(Austria) Horst Felbermayr Jr.	3
(United Kingdom) RLR MSport	Ligier JS P320	15	(United Kingdom) Alex Kapadia	3
(United Kingdom) RLR MSport	Ligier JS P320	53	(United Kingdom) Martin Rich	1–3
(United Kingdom) RLR MSport	Ligier JS P320	53	(United Kingdom) Tommy Foster	1–2
(United Kingdom) RLR MSport	Ligier JS P320	53	(Chile) Nico Pino	3
(United Kingdom) RLR MSport	Ligier JS P320	53	(United Kingdom) Simon Butler	4–5
(United Kingdom) RLR MSport	Ligier JS P320	53	(Germany) Valentino Catalano	4
(United Kingdom) RLR MSport	Ligier JS P320	53	(Austria) Horst Felbermayr Jr.	5
(France) IDEC Sport	Ligier JS P320	17	(France) Dino Lunardi	1–3, 5–6
(France) IDEC Sport	Ligier JS P320	17	(United States) Charles Crews	1
(France) IDEC Sport	Ligier JS P320	17	(France) Patrice Lafargue	2–3, 5–6
(United Kingdom) Optimum Motorsport	Duqueine M30 - D08	20	(United Kingdom) Mark Crader	All
(United Kingdom) Optimum Motorsport	Duqueine M30 - D08	20	(United Kingdom) Alex Mortimer	All
(France) H24 Racing	GreenGT H24	24	(Monaco) Stéphane Richelmi	1–3, 6
(Switzerland) Cool Racing	Ligier JS P320	25	(United Kingdom) Mike Benham	3
(Switzerland) Cool Racing	Ligier JS P320	25	(United Kingdom) Duncan Tappy	3
(Switzerland) Cool Racing	Ligier JS P320	69	(Denmark) Malthe Jakobsen	All
(Switzerland) Cool Racing	Ligier JS P320	69	(United States) Maurice Smith	All
(United Kingdom) 24-7 Motorsport	Ligier JS P320	27	(United Kingdom) Andrew Ferguson	All
(United Kingdom) 24-7 Motorsport	Ligier JS P320	27	(United Kingdom) Jeremy Ferguson	1
(United Kingdom) 24-7 Motorsport	Ligier JS P320	27	(United Kingdom) Louis Hamilton-Smith	2–6
(France) MV2S Forestier Racing	Ligier JS P320	28	(France) Emilien Carde	All
(France) MV2S Forestier Racing	Ligier JS P320	28	(France) Christophe Cresp	1–2, 4–6
(France) MV2S Forestier Racing	Ligier JS P320	28	(United Kingdom) Nick Adcock	3
(France) MV2S Forestier Racing	Ligier JS P320	29	(France) Louis Rousset	All
(France) MV2S Forestier Racing	Ligier JS P320	29	(Switzerland) Jérôme de Sadeleer	All
(Germany) Frikadelli Racing Team	Ligier JS P320	30	(Germany) Klaus Abbelen	1–4, 6
(Germany) Frikadelli Racing Team	Ligier JS P320	30	(Germany) Felipe Fernández Laser	1–4, 6
(Italy) AF Corse	Ligier JS P320	31	(Portugal) Rui Águas	1–2, 5–6
(Italy) AF Corse	Ligier JS P320	31	(Greece) Kriton Lendoudis	1–2, 5–6
(Italy) AF Corse	Ligier JS P320	31	(United States) Mark Kvamme	3
(Italy) AF Corse	Ligier JS P320	31	(United States) Trenton Estep	3
(Poland) Team Virage	Ligier JS P320	33	(United States) Rob Hodes	1–4
(Poland) Team Virage	Ligier JS P320	33	(Guatemala) Ian Rodríguez	1–4
(Poland) Team Virage	Ligier JS P320	33	(United States) Christian Bogle	5–6
(Poland) Team Virage	Ligier JS P320	33	Dimitry Gvazava	5
(Poland) Team Virage	Ligier JS P320	33	(Spain) Antonio Forne	6
(Poland) Team Virage	Ligier JS P320	72	(France) Alexandre Yvon	1–4
(Poland) Team Virage	Ligier JS P320	72	(France) Mathis Poulet	1–4
(Poland) Team Virage	Ligier JS P320	72	(Italy) Alessandro Bracalente	5–6
(Poland) Team Virage	Ligier JS P320	72	(France) Thomas Padovani	5
(Poland) Team Virage	Ligier JS P320	72	(Australia) Nathan Kumar	6
(Spain) CD Sport	Ligier JS P320	37	(France) Fabien Michal	1–3, 5
(Spain) CD Sport	Ligier JS P320	37	(Hong Kong) Shaun Thong	1
(Spain) CD Sport	Ligier JS P320	37	(France) Adam Eteki	2
(Spain) CD Sport	Ligier JS P320	37	(France) Grégory Guilvert	3, 5
(Spain) CD Sport	Ligier JS P320	37	(Spain) Belén García	6
(Spain) CD Sport	Ligier JS P320	37	(China) Huilin Han	6
(France) Graff Racing	Ligier JS P320	40	(Switzerland) Luis Sanjuan	All
(France) Graff Racing	Ligier JS P320	40	(Switzerland) Théo Vaucher	1–4
(France) Graff Racing	Ligier JS P320	40	(Switzerland) David Droux	5–6
(France) Graff Racing	Ligier JS P320	57	(United Kingdom) Ryan Harper-Ellam	All
(France) Graff Racing	Ligier JS P320	57	(France) Fabrice Rossello	1
(France) Graff Racing	Ligier JS P320	57	(Switzerland) Stephan Rupp	2–6
(Poland) Inter Europol Competition	Ligier JS P320	54	(France) Noam Abramczyk	3
(Poland) Inter Europol Competition	Ligier JS P320	54	(United States) Don Yount	3
(Italy) TS Corse	Duqueine M30 - D08	73	(Italy) Pietro Peccenini	All
(Italy) TS Corse	Duqueine M30 - D08	73	(Republic of Ireland) Cian Carey	1
(Italy) TS Corse	Duqueine M30 - D08	73	(India) Parth Ghorpade	2, 4
(Italy) TS Corse	Duqueine M30 - D08	73	(Chile) Benjamín Hites	3
(Italy) TS Corse	Duqueine M30 - D08	73	(United Kingdom) Kai Askey	5–6
(Germany) Reiter Engineering	Ligier JS P320	76	(United Kingdom) Freddie Hunt	All
(Germany) Reiter Engineering	Ligier JS P320	76	(Norway) Mads Siljehaug	All
(Iceland) Team Thor	Ligier JS P320	77	(Iceland) Auðunn Guðmundsson	All
(Iceland) Team Thor	Ligier JS P320	77	(Denmark) Michael H. Markussen	All

=== GT3 ===
Team	Car	Engine	No.	Drivers	Rounds
(Germany) Schnitzelalm Racing	Mercedes-AMG GT3 Evo	Mercedes-AMG M159 6.2 L V8	8	(United States) P. J. Hyett	6
(Germany) Schnitzelalm Racing	Mercedes-AMG GT3 Evo	Mercedes-AMG M159 6.2 L V8	8	(United States) Gunnar Jeannette	6
(Germany) Leipert Motorsport	Lamborghini Huracán GT3 Evo	Lamborghini 5.2 L V10	19	(United States) Gregg Gorski	3
(Germany) Leipert Motorsport	Lamborghini Huracán GT3 Evo	Lamborghini 5.2 L V10	19	(United States) Gerhard Watzinger	3
(Belgium) Belgian Audi Club Team WRT	Audi R8 LMS Evo II	Audi 5.2 L V10	34	(France) Arnold Robin	3
(Belgium) Belgian Audi Club Team WRT	Audi R8 LMS Evo II	Audi 5.2 L V10	34	(France) Maxime Robin	3
(Denmark) GMB Motorsport	Honda NSX GT3 Evo22	Honda 3.5 L Turbo V6	44	(Denmark) Gustav Birch	All
(Denmark) GMB Motorsport	Honda NSX GT3 Evo22	Honda 3.5 L Turbo V6	44	(Denmark) Jens Reno Møller	All
(Denmark) GMB Motorsport	Honda NSX GT3 Evo22	Honda 3.5 L Turbo V6	55	(Denmark) Kasper H. Jensen	All
(Denmark) GMB Motorsport	Honda NSX GT3 Evo22	Honda 3.5 L Turbo V6	55	(Denmark) Kristian Poulsen	All
(Denmark) GMB Motorsport	Honda NSX GT3 Evo22	Honda 3.5 L Turbo V6	88	(Denmark) Lars Engelbreckt Pedersen	All
(Denmark) GMB Motorsport	Honda NSX GT3 Evo22	Honda 3.5 L Turbo V6	88	(Denmark) Mikkel O. Pedersen	1–4
(Denmark) GMB Motorsport	Honda NSX GT3 Evo22	Honda 3.5 L Turbo V6	88	(Denmark) Jan Magnussen	5–6
(Italy) Ebimotors	Porsche 911 GT3 R	Porsche 4.0 L Flat-6	46	(Italy) Fabio Babini	1–4
(Italy) Ebimotors	Porsche 911 GT3 R	Porsche 4.0 L Flat-6	46	(Italy) Emanuele Busnelli	1–4
(Italy) Ebimotors	Porsche 911 GT3 R	Porsche 4.0 L Flat-6	56	(Italy) Max Busnelli	3
(Italy) Ebimotors	Porsche 911 GT3 R	Porsche 4.0 L Flat-6	56	(Italy) Paolo Venerosi	3
(Italy) AF Corse	Ferrari 488 GT3 Evo 2020	Ferrari F154CB 3.9 L Turbo V8	51	(United Kingdom) Luke Davenport	1–3
(Italy) AF Corse	Ferrari 488 GT3 Evo 2020	Ferrari F154CB 3.9 L Turbo V8	51	(Spain) Marcos Vivian	1–3
(Italy) AF Corse	Ferrari 488 GT3 Evo 2020	Ferrari F154CB 3.9 L Turbo V8	51	(Japan) Kei Cozzolino	6
(Italy) AF Corse	Ferrari 488 GT3 Evo 2020	Ferrari F154CB 3.9 L Turbo V8	51	(Japan) Hiroshi Koizumi	6
(Italy) AF Corse	Ferrari 488 GT3 Evo 2020	Ferrari F154CB 3.9 L Turbo V8	61	(Switzerland) Gino Forgione	1–5
(Italy) AF Corse	Ferrari 488 GT3 Evo 2020	Ferrari F154CB 3.9 L Turbo V8	61	(Italy) Andrea Montermini	1–5
(Switzerland) Spirit of Race	Ferrari 488 GT3 Evo 2020	Ferrari F154CB 3.9 L Turbo V8	52	(France) Hugo Delacour	3
(Switzerland) Spirit of Race	Ferrari 488 GT3 Evo 2020	Ferrari F154CB 3.9 L Turbo V8	52	(Monaco) Cédric Sbirrazzuoli	3
(United Kingdom) Team Parker Racing	Porsche 911 GT3 R	Porsche 4.0 L Flat-6	65	(United Kingdom) Nick Jones	6
(United Kingdom) Team Parker Racing	Porsche 911 GT3 R	Porsche 4.0 L Flat-6	65	(United Kingdom) Scott Malvern	6
(Switzerland) Kessel Racing	Ferrari 488 GT3 Evo 2020	Ferrari F154CB 3.9 L Turbo V8	74	(Australia) Scott Andrews	3
(Switzerland) Kessel Racing	Ferrari 488 GT3 Evo 2020	Ferrari F154CB 3.9 L Turbo V8	74	(United States) Anton Dias Perera	3
(France) Racetivity	Mercedes-AMG GT3 Evo	Mercedes-AMG M159 6.2 L V8	83	(France) Jean-Bernard Bouvet	3
(France) Racetivity	Mercedes-AMG GT3 Evo	Mercedes-AMG M159 6.2 L V8	83	(France) Charles-Henri Samani	3
(Spain) Bullitt Racing	Aston Martin Vantage AMR GT3	Aston Martin 4.0 L Turbo V8	99	(United Kingdom) Stephen Pattrick	All
(Spain) Bullitt Racing	Aston Martin Vantage AMR GT3	Aston Martin 4.0 L Turbo V8	99	(France) Théo Nouet	1–2
(Spain) Bullitt Racing	Aston Martin Vantage AMR GT3	Aston Martin 4.0 L Turbo V8	99	(France) Valentin Hasse-Clot	3–6

== Race results ==
Bold indicates the overall winner.

Round		Circuit	LMP3 Winners	GT3 Winners
1		(France) Le Castellet	**(Switzerland) No. 10 Racing Spirit of Léman**	(Denmark) No. 55 GMB Motorsport
1		(France) Le Castellet	**(France) Tom Dillmann** **(Germany) Alexander Mattschull**	(Denmark) Kasper H. Jensen (Denmark) Kristian Poulsen
2		(Italy) Imola	**(Switzerland) No. 69 Cool Racing**	(Denmark) No. 44 GMB Motorsport
2		(Italy) Imola	**(Denmark) Malthe Jakobsen** **(United States) Maurice Smith**	(Denmark) Gustav Birch (Denmark) Jens Reno Møller
3	R1	(France) Le Mans (report)	**(Switzerland) No. 10 Racing Spirit of Léman**	(Italy) No. 46 Ebimotors
3	R1	(France) Le Mans (report)	**(France) Tom Dillmann** **(Germany) Alexander Mattschull**	(Italy) Fabio Babini (Italy) Emanuele Busnelli
3	R2	(France) Le Mans (report)	**(Switzerland) No. 25 Cool Racing**	(Denmark) No. 55 GMB Motorsport
3	R2	(France) Le Mans (report)	**(United Kingdom) Mike Benham** **(United Kingdom) Duncan Tappy**	(Denmark) Kasper H. Jensen (Denmark) Kristian Poulsen
4		(Italy) Monza	**(Switzerland) No. 10 Racing Spirit of Léman**	(Denmark) No. 88 GMB Motorsport
4		(Italy) Monza	**(France) Tom Dillmann** **(Germany) Alexander Mattschull**	(Denmark) Lars Engelbreckt Pedersen (Denmark) Mikkel O. Pedersen
5		(Belgium) Spa-Francorchamps	**(France) No. 40 Graff Racing**	(Denmark) No. 44 GMB Motorsport
5		(Belgium) Spa-Francorchamps	**(Switzerland) David Droux** **(Switzerland) Luis Sanjuan**	(Denmark) Gustav Birch (Denmark) Jens Reno Møller
6		(Portugal) Portimão	**(Germany) No. 76 Reiter Engineering**	(Italy) No. 51 AF Corse
6		(Portugal) Portimão	**(United Kingdom) Freddie Hunt** **(Norway) Mads Siljehaug**	(Japan) Kei Cozzolino (Japan) Hiroshi Koizumi

== Standings ==
Points are awarded according to the following structure:

Position	1st	2nd	3rd	4th	5th	6th	7th	8th	9th	10th	Pole
Points	25	18	15	12	10	8	6	4	2	1	1
Le Mans	15	9	7	6	5	4	3	2	1		1

=== LMP3 Teams Championship ===
Pos.	Team	Car	LEC (France)	IMO (Italy)	LMS (France)		MNZ (Italy)	SPA (Belgium)	POR (Portugal)	Points
1	(Switzerland) #10 Racing Spirit of Léman	Ligier JS P320	1	12	1	3	1	6	3	97
2	(Germany) #76 Reiter Engineering	Ligier JS P320	11	16	5	2	**6**	**2**	1	73
3	(United Kingdom) #7 Nielsen Racing	Ligier JS P320	6	6	3	9	Ret	4	2	55
4	(Switzerland) #69 Cool Racing	Ligier JS P320	Ret	1	27	5	16	5	4	53
5	(France) #29 MV2S Forestier Racing	Ligier JS P320	2	**Ret**	7	11	2	7	Ret	47
6	(France) #43 Racing Spirit of Léman	Ligier JS P320	29	22	2	26	3	3	Ret	39
7	(France) #40 Graff Racing	Ligier JS P320	17	23	22	16	8	1	7	35
8	(Germany) #11 WTM Racing	Duqueine M30 - D08	**4**	Ret	Ret	**4**	5	15	**9**	34
9	(United Kingdom) #23 United Autosports	Ligier JS P320	13	2	4	23	11	14	10	25
10	(Spain) #27 CD Sport	Ligier JS P320	7	5	20	6		16	17	21
11	(France) #17 IDEC Sport	Ligier JS P320	5	7	26	Ret		9	19	18
12	(United Kingdom) #32 United Autosports	Ligier JS P320	10	18	10	12	7	22	6	16
13	(United Kingdom) #53 RLR MSport	Ligier JS P320	3	19	14	19	Ret	Ret		15
14	(United Kingdom) #22 United Autosports	Ligier JS P320	16	3	Ret	17	Ret	25	14	15
15	(Luxembourg) #14 DKR Engineering	Duqueine M30 - D08	20	11	8	7	Ret	8	8	15
16	(Austria) #9 AT Racing Team	Ligier JS P320	18	9	Ret	25	4	28	23	14
17	(Germany) #66 Rinaldi Racing	Duqueine M30 - D08	28	4	12	29	18	26	16	12
18	(Iceland) #77 Team Thor	Ligier JS P320	12	15	18	14	9	11	5	12
19	(United Kingdom) #4 Nielsen Racing	Duqueine M30 - D08	8	Ret	Ret	8	22	27	15	7
20	(France) #57 Graff Racing	Ligier JS P320	9	8	11	27	Ret	13	20	6
21	(Poland) #72 Team Virage	Ligier JS P320	19	Ret	9	10	17	19	21	3
22	(Switzerland) #13 Haegeli by T2 Racing	Duqueine M30 - D08		10	21	22	12	10	12	2
23	(Germany) #30 Frikadelli Racing Team	Ligier JS P320	23	Ret	23	Ret	10		11	1
24	(Luxembourg) #3 DKR Engineering	Duqueine M30 - D08	15	17	**13**	Ret	21	Ret	25	1
25	(Italy) #31 AF Corse	Ligier JS P320	26	Ret	19	28		12	24	0
26	(United Kingdom) #24 24-7 Motorsport	Ligier JS P320	27	13	Ret	Ret	13	24	28	0
27	(United Kingdom) #20 Optimum Motorsport	Duqueine M30 - D08	24	14	28	13	20	17	18	0
28	(France) #6 ANS Motorsport	Duqueine M30 - D08	21	Ret	15	Ret	14	Ret	27	0
29	(Italy) #73 TS Corse	Duqueine M30 - D08	14	24	17	Ret	19	23	29	0
30	(France) #28 MV2S Forestier Racing	Ligier JS P320	Ret	18	24	15	Ret	18	13	0
31	(United Kingdom) #2 United Autosports	Ligier JS P320	25	20	25	24	15	21	22	0
32	(Poland) #33 Team Virage	Ligier JS P320	22	21	Ret	Ret	23	20	Ret	0
33	(France) #24 H24 Racing	GreenGT H24	WD	25	NC	30			26	0
Teams ineligible to score points
-	(Switzerland) #25 Cool Racing	Ligier JS P320			6	1				-
-	(United Kingdom) #15 RLR MSport	Ligier JS P320			16	21				-
-	(United Kingdom) #21 United Autosports	Ligier JS P320			Ret	18				-
-	(Poland) #54 Inter Europol Competition	Ligier JS P320			Ret	20				-
Pos.	Team	Car	LEC (France)	IMO (Italy)	LMS (France)		MNZ (Italy)	SPA (Belgium)	POR (Portugal)	Points

Key
Colour	Result
Gold	Race winner
Silver	2nd place
Bronze	3rd place
Green	Points finish
Blue	Non-points finish
Blue	Non-classified finish (NC)
Purple	Did not finish (Ret)
Black	Disqualified (DSQ)
Black	Excluded (EX)
White	Did not start (DNS)
White	Race cancelled (C)
White	Withdrew (WD)
Blank	Did not participate

**Bold** – Pole
Italics – Fastest Lap

=== GT3 Teams Championship ===
Pos.	Team	Car	LEC (France)	IMO (Italy)	LMS (France)		MNZ (Italy)	SPA (Belgium)	POR (Portugal)	Points
1	(Denmark) #55 GMB Motorsport	Honda NSX GT3 Evo22	1	5	3	1	2	3	**3**	109
2	(Denmark) #88 GMB Motorsport	Honda NSX GT3 Evo22	5	4	9	7	1	2	2	93
3	(Denmark) #44 GMB Motorsport	Honda NSX GT3 Evo22	**2**	1	6	**Ret**	Ret	**1**	Ret	76
4	(Spain) #99 Bullitt Racing	Aston Martin Vantage AMR GT3	4	2	**7**	3	3	DNS	4	72
5	(Italy) #46 Ebimotors	Porsche 911 GT3 R	7	**3**	1	4	**4**			57
6	(Italy) #61 AF Corse	Ferrari 488 GT3 Evo 2020	3	6	4	Ret	5	4		52
7	(Italy) #51 AF Corse	Ferrari 488 GT3 Evo 2020	6	7	DNS	DNS	WD		1	39
Teams ineligible to score points
-	(Belgium) #34 Team WRT	Audi R8 LMS Evo II			2	2				-
-	(Italy) #56 Ebimotors	Porsche 911 GT3 R			5	5				-
-	(United Kingdom) #65 Team Parker Racing	Porsche 911 GT3 R							5	-
-	(Italy) #52 Spirit of Race	Ferrari 488 GT3 Evo 2020			Ret	6				-
-	(Germany) #19 Leipert Motorsport	Lamborghini Huracán GT3 Evo			8	8				-
-	(France) #83 Racetivity	Mercedes-AMG GT3 Evo			Ret	DNS				-
-	(Switzerland) #74 Kessel Racing	Ferrari 488 GT3 Evo 2020			DNS	DNS				-
-	(Germany) #8 Schnitzelalm Racing	Mercedes-AMG GT3 Evo							Ret	-
Pos.	Team	Car	LEC (France)	IMO (Italy)	LMS (France)		MNZ (Italy)	SPA (Belgium)	POR (Portugal)	Points

Key
Colour	Result
Gold	Race winner
Silver	2nd place
Bronze	3rd place
Green	Points finish
Blue	Non-points finish
Blue	Non-classified finish (NC)
Purple	Did not finish (Ret)
Black	Disqualified (DSQ)
Black	Excluded (EX)
White	Did not start (DNS)
White	Race cancelled (C)
White	Withdrew (WD)
Blank	Did not participate

**Bold** – Pole
Italics – Fastest Lap

=== LMP3 Drivers Championship ===
Pos.	Driver	Team	LEC (France)	IMO (Italy)	LMS (France)		MNZ (Italy)	SPA (Belgium)	POR (Portugal)	Points
1	(Germany) Alexander Mattschull	(Switzerland) #10 Racing Spirit of Léman	1	12	1	3	1	6	3	97
1	(France) Tom Dillmann	(Switzerland) #10 Racing Spirit of Léman	1	12	1	3	1	6	3	97
2	(United Kingdom) Freddie Hunt	(Germany) #76 Reiter Engineering	11	16	5	2	**6**	**2**	1	73
2	(Norway) Mads Siljehaug	(Germany) #76 Reiter Engineering	11	16	5	2	**6**	**2**	1	73
3	(United Kingdom) Colin Noble	(United Kingdom) #7 Nielsen Racing	6	6	3	9	Ret	4	2	55
3	(United Kingdom) Anthony Wells	(United Kingdom) #7 Nielsen Racing	6	6	3	9	Ret	4	2	55
4	(Denmark) Malthe Jakobsen	(Switzerland) #69 Cool Racing	Ret	1	27	5	16	5	4	41
4	(United States) Maurice Smith	(Switzerland) #69 Cool Racing	Ret	1	27	5	16	5	4	41
5	(Switzerland) Jérôme de Sadeleer	(France) #29 MV2S Forestier Racing	2	**Ret**	7	11	2	7	Ret	47
5	(France) Louis Rousset	(France) #29 MV2S Forestier Racing	2	**Ret**	7	11	2	7	Ret	47
6	(France) Jacques Wolff	(Switzerland) #43 Racing Spirit of Léman	29	22	2	26	3	3	Ret	39
6	(United Kingdom) Josh Skelton	(Switzerland) #43 Racing Spirit of Léman	29	22	2	26	3	3	Ret	39
7	(Switzerland) Luis Sanjuan	(France) #40 Graff Racing	17	23	22	16	8	1	7	35
8	(Germany) Torsten Kratz	(Germany) #11 WTM Racing	**4**	Ret	Ret	**4**	5	15	**9**	34
8	(Germany) Leonard Weiss	(Germany) #11 WTM Racing	**4**	Ret	Ret	**4**	5	15	**9**	34
9	(Switzerland) David Droux	(France) #40 Graff Racing						1	7	31
10	(United States) John Schauerman	(United Kingdom) #23 United Autosports	13	2	4	23	11	14	10	25
10	(United Kingdom) Wayne Boyd	(United Kingdom) #23 United Autosports	13	2	4	23	11	14	10	25
11	(France) Fabien Michal	(Spain) #37 CD Sport	7	5	20	6		16		21
12	(France) Dino Lunardi	(France) #17 IDEC Sport	5	7	26	Ret		9	19	18
13	(Brazil) Daniel Schneider	(United Kingdom) #32 United Autosports	10	18	9	12	7	22	6	16
14	(United Kingdom) Martin Rich	(United Kingdom) #53 RLR MSport	3	19	14	19				15
14	(United Kingdom) Tommy Foster	(United Kingdom) #53 RLR MSport	3	19						15
15	(Australia) Andres Latorre	(United Kingdom) #22 United Autosports	16	3	Ret	17	Ret	25	14	15
15	(Australia) Garnet Patterson	(United Kingdom) #22 United Autosports	16	3	Ret	17	Ret	25	14	15
16	(United Kingdom) Andy Meyrick	(United Kingdom) #32 United Autosports		18	9	12	7	22	6	15
17	(United Arab Emirates) Alexander Bukhantsov	(Luxembourg) #14 DKR Engineering	20	11	8	7	Ret	8	8	15
17	(Australia) James Winslow	(Luxembourg) #14 DKR Engineering	20	11	8	7	Ret	8	8	15
18	(Austria) Alexander Talkanitsa Sr.	(Austria) #9 AT Racing Team	18	9	Ret	25	4	28	23	14
19	(Germany) Daniel Keilwitz	(Germany) #66 Rinaldi Racing	28	4	12	29	18	26	16	12
19	(Germany) Steve Parrow	(Germany) #66 Rinaldi Racing	28	4	12	29	18	26	16	12
20	(France) Charles Milesi	(Austria) #9 AT Racing Team					4			12
21	(Iceland) Auðunn Guðmundsson	(Iceland) #77 Team Thor	12	15	18	14	9	11	5	12
21	(Denmark) Michael H. Markussen	(Iceland) #77 Team Thor	12	15	18	14	9	11	5	12
22	(United States) Charles Crews	(France) #17 IDEC Sport	5							10
23	(France) Adam Eteki	(Spain) #37 CD Sport		5						10
24	(France) Patrice Lafargue	(France) #17 IDEC Sport		7	26	Ret		9	19	8
25	(United Kingdom) Matthew Bell	(United Kingdom) #4 Nielsen Racing	8	Ret	Ret	8	22	27	15	7
25	(United Kingdom) John Melsom	(United Kingdom) #4 Nielsen Racing	8	Ret	Ret	8	22	27	15	7
26	(Hong Kong) Shaun Thong	(Spain) #37 CD Sport	7							6
27	(United Kingdom) Ryan Harper-Ellam	(France) #57 Graff Racing	9	8	11	27	Ret	13	20	6
28	(France) Grégory Guilvert	(Spain) #37 CD Sport			20	6		16		5
29	(Switzerland) Stephan Rupp	(France) #57 Graff Racing		8	11	27	Ret	13	20	4
30	(Switzerland) Théo Vaucher	(France) #40 Graff Racing	17	23	22	16	8			4
31	(France) Alexandre Yvon	(Poland) #72 Team Virage	19	Ret	9	10	17			3
31	(France) Mathis Poulet	(Poland) #72 Team Virage	19	Ret	9	10	17			3
32	(France) Fabrice Rossello	(France) #57 Graff Racing	9							2
33	(Austria) Alexander Talkanitsa Jr.	(Austria) #9 AT Racing Team	18	9				28	23	2
34	(Switzerland) Pieder Decurtins	(Switzerland) #13 Haegeli by T2 Racing		10	21	22	12	10	12	2
35	(Netherlands) Kay van Berlo	(United Kingdom) #32 United Autosports	10							1
36	(Germany) Lars Kern	(Switzerland) #13 Haegeli by T2 Racing		10						1
37	(Germany) Felipe Fernández Laser	(Germany) #30 Frikadelli Racing Team	23	Ret	23	Ret	10		11	1
37	(Germany) Klaus Abbelen	(Germany) #30 Frikadelli Racing Team	23	Ret	23	Ret	10		11	1
38	(Germany) Marc Basseng	(Switzerland) #13 Haegeli by T2 Racing			21	22	12	10	13	1
39	(United States) Jon Brownson	(Luxembourg) #3 DKR Engineering	15	17	**13**	Ret	21	Ret	25	1
39	(Germany) Laurents Hörr	(Luxembourg) #3 DKR Engineering	15	17	**13**	Ret	21	Ret	25	1
Drivers who have not scored points are not shown in this table.
Pos.	Driver	Team	LEC (France)	IMO (Italy)	LMS (France)		MNZ (Italy)	SPA (Belgium)	POR (Portugal)	Points

Key
Colour	Result
Gold	Race winner
Silver	2nd place
Bronze	3rd place
Green	Points finish
Blue	Non-points finish
Blue	Non-classified finish (NC)
Purple	Did not finish (Ret)
Black	Disqualified (DSQ)
Black	Excluded (EX)
White	Did not start (DNS)
White	Race cancelled (C)
White	Withdrew (WD)
Blank	Did not participate

**Bold** – Pole
Italics – Fastest Lap

=== GT3 Drivers Championship ===
Pos.	Driver	Team	LEC (France)	IMO (Italy)	LMS (France)		MNZ (Italy)	SPA (Belgium)	POR (Portugal)	Points
1	(Denmark) Kasper H. Jensen	(Denmark) GMB Motorsport	1	5	3	1	2	3	**3**	109
1	(Denmark) Kristian Poulsen	(Denmark) GMB Motorsport	1	5	3	1	2	3	**3**	109
2	(Denmark) Lars Engelbreckt Pedersen	(Denmark) GMB Motorsport	5	4	9	7	1	2	2	93
3	(Denmark) Gustav Birch	(Denmark) GMB Motorsport	**2**	1	6	**Ret**	Ret	**1**	Ret	76
3	(Denmark) Jens Møller	(Denmark) GMB Motorsport	**2**	1	6	**Ret**	Ret	**1**	Ret	76
4	(United Kingdom) Stephen Pattrick	(Spain) Bullitt Racing	4	2	**7**	3	3	DNS	4	72
5	(Denmark) Mikkel O. Pedersen	(Denmark) GMB Motorsport	5	4	9	7	1			57
6	(Italy) Emanuele Busnelli	(Italy) Ebimotors	7	**3**	1	4	**4**			57
6	(Italy) Fabio Babini	(Italy) Ebimotors	7	**3**	1	4	**4**			57
7	(Italy) Andrea Montermini	(Italy) AF Corse	3	6	4	Ret	5	4		52
7	(Switzerland) Gino Forgione	(Italy) AF Corse	3	6	4	Ret	5	4		52
8	(France) Valentin Hasse-Clot	(Spain) Bullitt Racing			**7**	3	3	DNS	4	42
9	(Denmark) Jan Magnussen	(Denmark) GMB Motorsport						2	2	36
10	(France) Théo Nouet	(Spain) Bullitt Racing	4	2						30
11	(Japan) Kei Cozzolino	(Italy) AF Corse							1	25
11	(Japan) Hiroshi Koizumi	(Italy) AF Corse							1	25
12	(United Kingdom) Luke Davenport	(Italy) AF Corse	6	7	DNS	DNS	WD			14
12	(Spain) Marcos Vivian	(Italy) AF Corse	6	7	DNS	DNS	WD			14
Pos.	Driver	Team	LEC (France)	IMO (Italy)	LMS (France)		MNZ (Italy)	SPA (Belgium)	POR (Portugal)	Points

Key
Colour	Result
Gold	Race winner
Silver	2nd place
Bronze	3rd place
Green	Points finish
Blue	Non-points finish
Blue	Non-classified finish (NC)
Purple	Did not finish (Ret)
Black	Disqualified (DSQ)
Black	Excluded (EX)
White	Did not start (DNS)
White	Race cancelled (C)
White	Withdrew (WD)
Blank	Did not participate

**Bold** – Pole
Italics – Fastest Lap
