= 2026 Lamborghini Super Trofeo North America =

14th season of a one-make racing series by Lamborghini

The 2026 Lamborghini Super Trofeo North America was the fourteenth season of Lamborghini Super Trofeo North America. The season began on March 18 at Sebring and ended on October 25 with the World Final at Monza, featuring six rounds.

== Calendar ==
Rnd.	Circuit	Date	Supporting
1	Sebring International Raceway, Sebring, Florida	March 18–20	IMSA SportsCar Championship
2	WeatherTech Raceway Laguna Seca, Monterey, California	May 1–3	IMSA SportsCar Championship
3	(New York (state)) Watkins Glen International, Watkins Glen, New York	June 25–27	IMSA SportsCar Championship
4	Road America, Elkhart Lake, Wisconsin	July 30 – August 1	IMSA SportsCar Championship
5	Indianapolis Motor Speedway, Speedway, Indiana	September 18–20	IMSA SportsCar Championship
6	Autodromo Nazionale di Monza, Monza, Italy	October 21–23	Lamborghini Super Trofeo World Final

== Entry list ==
All teams use the Lamborghini Huracán Super Trofeo EVO2.

Team	Dealership	No.	Drivers	Class	Rounds
(United States) Wayne Taylor Racing	(Florida) Palm Beach	1	(Sweden) Hampus Ericsson	P	All
(United States) Wayne Taylor Racing	(Florida) Palm Beach	1	(United States) Nick Persing	P	All
(United States) Wayne Taylor Racing	(Florida) Palm Beach	7	(United States) Al Morey IV	P	All
(United States) Wayne Taylor Racing	(Florida) Palm Beach	7	(United Kingdom) James Wallis	P	All
(United States) Wayne Taylor Racing	(Florida) Palm Beach	10	(United States) Graham Doyle	PA	All
(United States) Wayne Taylor Racing	(Florida) Palm Beach	10	(Costa Rica) Danny Formal	PA	All
(United States) Wayne Taylor Racing	(Florida) Palm Beach	41	(United States) Marc Miller	PA	All
(United States) Wayne Taylor Racing	(Florida) Palm Beach	41	(United States) Paul Nemschoff	PA	All
(United States) RAFA Racing Team	(Texas) Austin	2	(United Kingdom) Jem Hepworth	P	1–2
(United States) RAFA Racing Team	(Texas) Austin	2	(Colombia) Tatiana Calderón	P	1
(United States) RAFA Racing Team	(Texas) Austin	2	(United States) Tyler Gonzalez	P	2–5
(United States) RAFA Racing Team	(Texas) Austin	2	(Brazil) Kiko Porto	P	3–5
(United States) RAFA Racing Team	(Texas) Austin	81	(United States) Chloe Chambers	PA	All
(United States) RAFA Racing Team	(Texas) Austin	81	(United States) Ian Porter	PA	All
(United States) Forty7 Motorsports	(Connecticut) Greenwich	3	(United States) Jackson Lee	P	1–2
(United States) Forty7 Motorsports	(Connecticut) Greenwich	3	(United States) Matt Jaskol	P	1
(United States) Forty7 Motorsports	(Connecticut) Greenwich	3	(United States) Dominic Starkweather	P	2–5
(United States) Forty7 Motorsports	(Connecticut) Greenwich	3	(United States) Jake Walker	P	3
(United States) Forty7 Motorsports	(Connecticut) Greenwich	3	(United States) AJ Muss	P	4
(United States) Forty7 Motorsports	(Florida) Palm Beach	40	(United States) Angelo Dinkov	PA	4–6
(United States) Forty7 Motorsports	(Florida) Palm Beach	40	(United States) Jack William Miller	PA	4–6
(United States) Forty7 Motorsports	(Pennsylvania) Philadelphia	66	(United States) Christopher Koebbe	LC	All
(United States) Forty7 Motorsports	(Pennsylvania) Philadelphia	77	(United States) Lindsay Brewer	PA	All
(United States) Forty7 Motorsports	(Pennsylvania) Philadelphia	77	(United States) Keawn Tandon	PA	All
(United States) Forty7 Motorsports	(Connecticut) Greenwich	95	(United States) Christopher Tasca	LC	1–5
(United States) ANSA Motorsports	(Florida) Broward	4	(Jamaica) Tommi Gore	P	All
(United States) ANSA Motorsports	(Florida) Broward	4	(United States) Colin Queen	P	1, 3–6
(United States) ANSA Motorsports	(Florida) Broward	4	(France) Nico Jamin	P	2
(United States) ANSA Motorsports	(Florida) Broward	17	(United States) Connor Qvale	LC	4–5
(United States) ANSA Motorsports	(Florida) Broward	30	(United States) Jeff Courtney	LC	3
(United States) ANSA Motorsports	(Florida) Broward	30	(Canada) Fred Roberts	LC	3
(United States) ANSA Motorsports	(Florida) Broward	94	(United States) Stephen Sorbaro	LC	3
(United States) 89x Motorsports	(Florida) Sarasota	9	(United States) Christian Pipas	LC	3, 5
(United States) 89x Motorsports	(Florida) Sarasota	89	(United States) Johan Schwartz	Am	All
(United States) 89x Motorsports	(Florida) Sarasota	89	(United States) Michael Fitzpatrick	Am	2–6
(Canada) TB Autosports	(Canada) Montreal	11	(Canada) Philippe Touchette	LC	All
(Canada) TB Autosports	(Canada) Montreal	19	(Canada) Mathieu Boucher	PA	1–2, 4–6
(Canada) TB Autosports	(Canada) Montreal	19	(Canada) Kyle Marcelli	PA	1–2, 4–6
(Canada) TB Autosports	(Canada) Montreal	19	(Canada) Mathieu Boucher	Am	3
(United States) XONINE RACING	(Illinois) Chicago	12	(United States) Anthony Bullock	Am	All
(United States) XONINE RACING	(Illinois) Chicago	13	(New Zealand) Chris van der Drift	PA	4
(United States) XONINE RACING	(Illinois) Chicago	13	(Australia) Todd Kingsford	PA	4
(United States) XONINE RACING	(Illinois) Downers Grove	33	(Lithuania) Darius Trinka	P	1–5
(United States) XONINE RACING	(Illinois) Downers Grove	33	(United States) Dominic Starkweather	P	1
(United States) XONINE RACING	(Illinois) Downers Grove	33	(New Zealand) Will Bamber	P	2–6
(United States) XONINE RACING	(Illinois) Chicago	57	(United States) Nick Groat	Am	All
(United States) XONINE RACING	(Illinois) Downers Grove	72	(United States) Troy Petersen	LC	All
(United States) XONINE RACING	(Illinois) Downers Grove	72	(United States) Josh Esfahani	LC	2–4
(United States) Alliance Racing	(Florida) Palm Beach	16	(United States) Rodin Younessi	LC	1
(United States) Alliance Racing	(Florida) Broward	28	(United States) Luke Berkeley	P	1
(United States) Alliance Racing	(Florida) Broward	28	(United States) Ernie Francis Jr.	P	1
(United States) Alliance Racing	(Florida) Palm Beach	40	(United States) Angelo Dinkov	PA	1–3
(United States) Alliance Racing	(Florida) Palm Beach	40	(United States) Jack William Miller	PA	1–3
(Canada) Atlantic Racing Team		22	(Canada) James Lawley	P	All
(United States) SP Motorsports	(California) San Francisco	27	(United States) Jaden Conwright	P	All
(United States) SP Motorsports	(California) San Francisco	27	(United States) Joaquin Morillo	P	All
(United States) SP Motorsports	(California) San Francisco	74	(United States) Daniel Morillo	Am	All
(United States) SP Motorsports	(California) San Francisco	74	(United States) Paul Whiting	Am	All
(United States) TR3 Racing	(Florida) Miami	29	(United States) Elias De La Torre IV	P	All
(United States) TR3 Racing	(Florida) Miami	29	(New Zealand) Will Bamber	P	1
(United States) TR3 Racing	(Florida) Miami	29	(Denmark) Dennis Lind	P	2, 4–6
(United States) TR3 Racing	(Florida) Miami	29	(Canada) Daniel Morad	P	3
(United States) TR3 Racing	(Florida) Orlando	37	(United States) Clay Wilson	LC	1–5
(United States) TR3 Racing	(Florida) Miami	63	(Mexico) Martin Fuentes	PA	All
(United States) TR3 Racing	(Florida) Miami	63	(United States) Mateo Siderman	PA	All
(United States) TR3 Racing	(Florida) Miami	70	(Canada) Dean Neuls	Am	All
(United States) Kaizen Autosport	(Florida) Palm Beach	36	(United States) Andrew Heffring	PA	All
(United States) Kaizen Autosport	(Florida) Palm Beach	36	(United States) Joel Miller	PA	All
(United States) Kaizen Autosport	(Florida) Palm Beach	44	(United States) Wyatt Foster	PA	All
(United States) Kaizen Autosport	(Florida) Palm Beach	44	(United States) Seth Henry	PA	All
(United States) TPC Racing	(Washington, D.C.) Washington	38	(United States) Scott Schmidt	LC	1, 3
(United States) Precision Performance Motorsports	(Florida) Palm Beach	45	(United States) Gabriel Holguin	Am	All
(United States) Precision Performance Motorsports	(Florida) Palm Beach	46	(United States) Brandon Gdovic	P	1–3
(United States) Precision Performance Motorsports	(Florida) Palm Beach	47	(United States) Cooper Broll	PA	1
(United States) Precision Performance Motorsports	(Florida) Palm Beach	47	(United States) Derek Ware	PA	1
(United States) Precision Performance Motorsports	(Florida) Palm Beach	47	(United States) Derek Ware	Am	2–3
(United States) Precision Performance Motorsports	(Florida) Palm Beach	47	(United States) Sean McAuliffe	Am	2
(United States) Precision Performance Motorsports	(Florida) Palm Beach	47	(United States) Cooper Broll	Am	3–6
(United States) Precision Performance Motorsports	(Florida) Palm Beach	48	(United States) David Staab	Am	All
(United States) Topp Racing	(Florida) Palm Beach	55	(United States) Avery Towns	P	1–3
(United States) Topp Racing	(Connecticut) Greenwich	99	(United States) Rocky T Bolduc	LC	All
(Germany) Leipert Motorsport		56	(Canada) Fred Roberts	LC	6
(United States) Taurino Racing	(California) Newport Beach	65	(United States) Ray Shahi	LC	All
(United States) Taurino Racing	(California) Newport Beach	88	(South Africa) Giano Taurino	P	All
(United States) Breathless Racing	(Florida) Broward	73	(United States) Luke Berkeley	P	3–5
(United States) Breathless Racing	(Florida) Broward	73	(United States) Ernie Francis Jr.	P	3–5

Icon	Class
P	Pro Cup
PA	Pro-Am Cup
Am	Am Cup
LC	LB Cup

== Race results ==
Bold indicates overall winner.

Round		Circuit	Pro Winner	Pro-Am Winner	Am Winner	LB Cup Winner
1	R1	(Florida) Sebring International Raceway	**(United States) #29 TR3 Racing**	(United States) #10 Wayne Taylor Racing	(United States) #57 XONINE RACING	(United States) #65 Taurino Racing
1	R1	(Florida) Sebring International Raceway	**(New Zealand) Will Bamber** **(United States) Elias De La Torre IV**	(United States) Graham Doyle (Costa Rica) Danny Formal	(United States) Nick Groat	(United States) Ray Shahi
1	R2	(Florida) Sebring International Raceway	**(United States) #29 TR3 Racing**	(United States) #10 Wayne Taylor Racing	(United States) #70 TR3 Racing	(United States) #99 Topp Racing
1	R2	(Florida) Sebring International Raceway	**(New Zealand) Will Bamber** **(United States) Elias De La Torre IV**	(United States) Graham Doyle (Costa Rica) Danny Formal	(Canada) Dean Neuls	(United States) Rocky T Bolduc
2	R1	(California) WeatherTech Raceway Laguna Seca	**(United States) #1 Wayne Taylor Racing**	(United States) #10 Wayne Taylor Racing	(United States) #12 XONINE RACING	(Canada) #11 TB Autosports
2	R1	(California) WeatherTech Raceway Laguna Seca	**(Sweden) Hampus Ericsson** **(United States) Nick Persing**	(United States) Graham Doyle (Costa Rica) Danny Formal	(United States) Anthony Bullock	(Canada) Philippe Touchette
2	R2	(California) WeatherTech Raceway Laguna Seca	**(United States) #33 XONINE RACING**	(United States) #10 Wayne Taylor Racing	(United States) #48 Precision Performance Motorsports	(United States) #66 Forty7 Motorsports
2	R2	(California) WeatherTech Raceway Laguna Seca	**(New Zealand) Will Bamber** **(Lithuania) Darius Trinka**	(United States) Graham Doyle (Costa Rica) Danny Formal	(United States) David Staab	(United States) Christopher Koebbe
3	R1	(New York (state)) Watkins Glen International	**(United States) #29 TR3 Racing**	(United States) #10 Wayne Taylor Racing	(United States) #70 TR3 Racing	(United States) #99 Topp Racing
3	R1	(New York (state)) Watkins Glen International	**(United States) Elias De La Torre IV** **(Canada) Daniel Morad**	(United States) Graham Doyle (Costa Rica) Danny Formal	(Canada) Dean Neuls	(United States) Rocky T Bolduc
3	R2	(New York (state)) Watkins Glen International	**(United States) #29 TR3 Racing**	(United States) #10 Wayne Taylor Racing	(United States) #12 XONINE RACING	(United States) #95 Forty7 Motorsports
3	R2	(New York (state)) Watkins Glen International	**(United States) Elias De La Torre IV** **(Canada) Daniel Morad**	(United States) Graham Doyle (Costa Rica) Danny Formal	(United States) Anthony Bullock	(United States) Christopher Tasca
4	R1	(Wisconsin) Road America	**(United States) #33 XONINE RACING**	(United States) #10 Wayne Taylor Racing	(United States) #89 89x Motorsports	(United States) #95 Forty7 Motorsports
4	R1	(Wisconsin) Road America	**(New Zealand) Will Bamber** **(Lithuania) Darius Trinka**	(United States) Graham Doyle (Costa Rica) Danny Formal	(United States) Michael Fitzpatrick (United States) Johan Schwartz	(United States) Christopher Tasca
4	R2	(Wisconsin) Road America	**(United States) #1 Wayne Taylor Racing**	(United States) #81 RAFA Racing Team	(United States) #45 Precision Performance Motorsports	(Canada) #11 TB Autosports
4	R2	(Wisconsin) Road America	**(Sweden) Hampus Ericsson** **(United States) Nick Persing**	(United States) Chloe Chambers (United States) Ian Porter	(United States) Gabriel Holguin	(Canada) Philippe Touchette
5	R1	(Indiana) Indianapolis Motor Speedway	**(United States) #29 TR3 Racing**	(United States) #10 Wayne Taylor Racing	(United States) #12 XONINE RACING	(United States) #99 Topp Racing
5	R1	(Indiana) Indianapolis Motor Speedway	**(United States) Elias De La Torre IV** **(Denmark) Dennis Lind**	(United States) Graham Doyle (Costa Rica) Danny Formal	(United States) Anthony Bullock	(United States) Rocky T Bolduc
5	R2	(Indiana) Indianapolis Motor Speedway	**(United States) #88 Taurino Racing**	(United States) #44 Kaizen Autosport	(United States) #48 Precision Performance Motorsports	(United States) #99 Topp Racing
5	R2	(Indiana) Indianapolis Motor Speedway	**(South Africa) Giano Taurino**	(United States) Wyatt Foster (United States) Seth Henry	(United States) David Staab	(United States) Rocky T Bolduc
6	R1	(Italy) Monza Circuit	**(United States) #29 TR3 Racing**	(United States) #10 Wayne Taylor Racing	(United States) #48 Precision Performance Motorsports	(Canada) #11 TB Autosports
6	R1	(Italy) Monza Circuit	**(United States) Elias De La Torre IV** **(Denmark) Dennis Lind**	(United States) Graham Doyle (Costa Rica) Danny Formal	(United States) David Staab	(Canada) Philippe Touchette
6	R2	(Italy) Monza Circuit	**(United States) #13 XONINE RACING**	(United States) #10 Wayne Taylor Racing	(United States) #48 Precision Performance Motorsports	(Canada) #11 TB Autosports
6	R2	(Italy) Monza Circuit	**(New Zealand) Will Bamber**	(United States) Graham Doyle (Costa Rica) Danny Formal	(United States) David Staab	(Canada) Philippe Touchette

== Championship standings ==
=== Points system ===
Championship points are awarded in each class at the finish of each event. Points are awarded based on finishing positions in the race as shown in the chart below.

Position	1st	2nd	3rd	4th	5th	6th	7th	8th	9th	10th	Pole
Points	15	12	10	8	6	5	4	3	2	1	**1**

For the teams and dealerships championship, each team or dealership takes the points of the two highest-placing entries within class. One additional point is also awarded for each class pole position in each race.

=== Drivers' Championship ===
Pos.	Drivers	SEB		LGA		WGL		ELK		IND		MNZ		Points
Pro
1	(United States) Elias De La Torre IV	**1**	**1**	**2**	**12**	**1**	**1**	3	2	**1**	10	**1**	3	143
2	(New Zealand) Will Bamber	**1**	**1**	11	1	2	3	**1**	10	7	3	4	**1**	124
3	(Sweden) Hampus Ericsson (United States) Nick Persing	2	2	1	4	12	9	2	**1**	2	8	2	2	116
4	(Lithuania) Darius Trinka	5	5	11	1	2	3	**1**	10	7	3			80
5	(Denmark) Dennis Lind			**2**	**12**			3	2	**1**	10	**1**	3	79
6	(Jamaica) Tommi Gore	12	3	3	2	5	6	8	4	5	5	8	7	73
7	(United States) Al Morey IV (United Kingdom) James Wallis	6	10	6	3	9	4	6	8	4	4	3	5	71
8	(South Africa) Giano Taurino	13	6	5	7	11	8	5	5	3	**1**	7	6	65
9	(United States) Tyler Gonzalez			9	6	3	2	4	3	6	2			64
10	(Brazil) Kiko Porto					3	2	4	3	6	2			57
11	(United States) Colin Queen	12	3			5	6	8	4	5	5	8	7	51
12	(United States) Jaden Conwright (United States) Joaquin Morillo	8	7	10	10	8	7	7	6	10	6	5	4	45
13	(United States) Brandon Gdovic	4	4	4	5	4	11							38
14	(United States) Dominic Starkweather	5	5	8	9	6	5	10	9	9	9			35
15	(Canada) Daniel Morad					**1**	**1**							32
16	(Canada) James Lawley	9	13	7	8	10	13	9	7	8	7	6	8	31
17	(France) Nico Jamin			3	2									22
18	(United States) Ernie Francis Jr.	3	8			13	10							14
19	(United States) Jake Walker					6	5							11
20	(United States) Jackson Lee	7	12	8	9									9
21	(United Kingdom) Jem Hepworth	10	11	9	6									8
22	(United States) Avery Towns	11	9	11	11	7	12							6
23	(United States) Matt Jaskol	7	12											4
24	(Colombia) Tatiana Calderón	10	11											1
25	(United States) Luke Berkeley					13	10							1
Pro-Am
1	(United States) Graham Doyle (Costa Rica) Danny Formal	**1**	1	1	1	**1**	1	**1**	5	**1**	2	**1**	1	173
2	(United States) Lindsay Brewer (United States) Keawn Tandon	2	3	5	2	3	5	6	9	2	3	2	2	109
3	(United States) Wyatt Foster (United States) Seth Henry	3	2	4	3	6	7	4	6	4	**1**	9	3	100
4	(Mexico) Martin Fuentes (United States) Mateo Siderman	4	4	3	4	4	3	3	8	9	4	3	5	91
5	(United States) Chloe Chambers (United States) Ian Porter	7	9	9	5	8	2	2	1	3	5	5	9	78
6	(United States) Marc Miller (United States) Paul Nemschoff	8	**7**	2	**8**	2	**4**	8	**4**	5	8	8	**6**	70
7	(United States) Andrew Heffring (United States) Joel Miller	10	6	**7**	9	5	8	7	2	6	6	6	4	66
8	(United States) Angelo Dinkov (United States) Jack William Miller	6	5	6	6	7	6	10	7	8	7	7	8	49
9	(Canada) Mathieu Boucher (Canada) Kyle Marcelli	5	8	8	7			9	3	7	9	4	7	46
10	(New Zealand) Chris van der Drift (Thailand) Todd Kingsford							5	10					7
11	(United States) Cooper Broll (United States) Derek Ware	9	10											3
Am
1	(United States) David Staab	2	**3**	3	**1**	3	3	2	2	2	**1**	**1**	**1**	154
2	(Canada) Dean Neuls	5	1	8	4	1	**2**	5	4	3	5	6	3	104
3	(United States) Gabriel Holguin	4	7	5	2	6	5	4	1	4	3	2	5	100
4	(United States) Anthony Bullock	7	6	1	6	**8**	1	**8**	**DNS**	**1**	4	4	8	87
5	(United States) Johan Schwartz	**3**	2	7	3	4	9	1	5	5	6	8	6	87
6	(United States) Nick Groat	1	4	2	7	7	4	7	3	7	7	7	7	81
7	(United States) Cooper Broll					2	8	3	7	6	2	3	2	68
8	(United States) Michael Fitzpatrick			7	3	4	9	1	5	5	6	8	6	64
9	(United States) Daniel Morillo (United States) Paul Whiting	6	5	6	8	5	6	6	6	8	DNS	5	4	58
10	(United States) Derek Ware			**4**	5	2	8							30
11	(United States) Sean McAuliffe			**4**	5									15
12	(Canada) Mathieu Boucher					9	7							6
LB Cup
1	(Canada) Philippe Touchette	2	2	1	4	2	2	**2**	**1**	8	2	**1**	**1**	145
2	(United States) Rocky T Bolduc	**5**	1	**2**	3	1	3	5	3	**1**	**1**	4	5	132
3	(United States) Ray Shahi	1	3	DNS	DNS	3	9	6	2	2	6	2	3	93
4	(United States) Christopher Koebbe	4	5	4	1	**8**	10	4	7	9	4	3	4	84
5	(United States) Christopher Tasca	7	**9**	3	**2**	11	1	1	6	7	8			74
6	(United States) Clay Wilson	3	7	5	6	5	5	3	5	3	3			73
7	(United States) Troy Petersen	6	8	6	5	6	**4**	7	4	6	7			54
8	(United States) Josh Esfahani			6	5	6	**4**	7	4					37
9	(United States) Christian Pipas					4	7			5	5			24
10	(Canada) Fred Roberts					7	11					5	2	22
11	(United States) Scott Schmidt	8	4			10	8							15
12	(United States) Connor Qvale							DNS	DNS	4	9			10
13	(United States) Rodin Younessi	9	6											7
14	(United States) Stephen Sorbaro					9	6							7
15	(United States) Jeff Courtney					7	11							4
Pos.	Drivers	SEB		LGA		WGL		ELK		IND		MNZ		Points

Colour	Result
Gold	Winner
Silver	Second place
Bronze	Third place
Green	Points classification
Blue	Non-points classification
Blue	Non-classified finish (NC)
Purple	Retired, not classified (Ret)
Red	Did not qualify (DNQ)
Red	Did not pre-qualify (DNPQ)
Black	Disqualified (DSQ)
White	Did not start (DNS)
White	Withdrew (WD)
White	Race cancelled (C)
Blank	Did not practice (DNP)
Blank	Did not arrive (DNA)
Blank	Excluded (EX)

**Bold** - Pole position

=== Teams' Championship ===
Pos.	Team	Points
1	(United States) Wayne Taylor Racing	321
2	(United States) TR3 Racing	286
3	(United States) Precision Performance Motorsports	278
4	(United States) XONINE RACING	243
5	(United States) Forty7 Motorsports	230
6	(Canada) TB Autosports	197
7	(United States) Kaizen Autosport	166
8	(United States) Taurino Racing	159
9	(United States) RAFA Racing Team	143
10	(United States) Topp Racing	137
11	(United States) 89x Motorsports	111
12	(United States) SP Motorsports	103
13	(United States) ANSA Motorsports	92
14	(United States) Alliance Racing	52
15	(Canada) Atlantic Racing Team	38
16	(Germany) Leipert Motorsport	18
17	(United States) TPC Racing	15
18	(United States) Breathless Racing	1

=== Dealers' Championship ===
Pos.	Team	Points
1	(Florida) Palm Beach	360
2	(Florida) Miami	280
3	(Illinois) Chicago	232
4	(Connecticut) Greenwich	210
5	(Canada) Montreal	197
6	(California) Newport Beach	159
7	(Texas) Austin	143
8	(Pennsylvania) Philadelphia	122
9	(Florida) Broward	105
10	(Florida) Sarasota	100
11	(California) San Francisco	98
12	(Florida) Orlando	73
13	(Texas) Houston	69
14	(Illinois) Downers Grove	54
15	(Washington, D.C.) Washington	15
