= 2024 IMSA SportsCar Weekend =

Eighth round of the 2024 IMSA SportsCar Championship season

The layout of Road America, where the race was held.

The 2024 IMSA SportsCar Weekend was a sports car race held at Road America near Elkhart Lake, Wisconsin, on August 4, 2024. It was the eighth round of the 2024 IMSA SportsCar Championship.

== Background ==
=== Preview ===
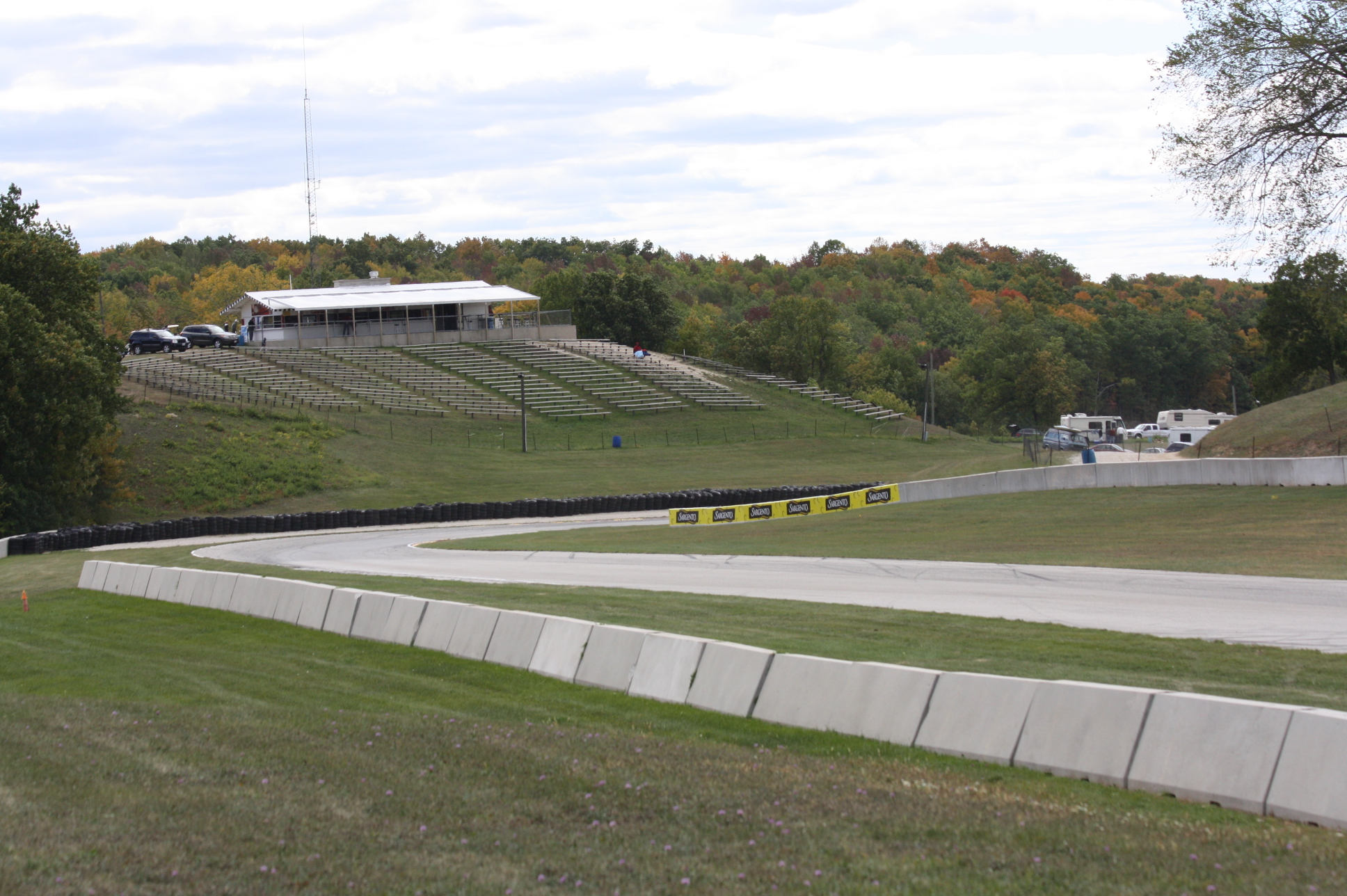
Road America, where the race was held.

International Motor Sports Association (IMSA) president John Doonan confirmed the race was part of the 2024 IMSA SportsCar Championship (IMSA SCC) in August 2023. It was the eleventh consecutive time the IMSA SCC hosted a race at Road America. The 2024 IMSA SportsCar Weekend was the eighth of eleven scheduled sports car races of 2024 by IMSA. The race was held at the fourteen-turn 4.048 mi (6.515 km) Road America on August 4, 2024.

=== Standings before the race ===
Preceding the event, the GTP Drivers' Championship was led by Dane Cameron and Felipe Nasr with 2044 points, 93 points ahead of the duo of Sébastien Bourdais and Renger van der Zande. Mathieu Jaminet and Nick Tandy sat in third, a further 39 points behind. Felipe Fraga and Gar Robinson were leading the LMP2 Drivers' Championship with 1308 points, 12 points ahead of Nick Boulle and Tom Dillmann, who won the previous race at Mosport Park. Ryan Dalziel sat in third, 135 points behind Fraga and Robinson. The GTD Pro Drivers' Championship was led by Laurin Heinrich and Sebastian Priaulx, with 1955 points. They were 98 points ahead of second-placed Ross Gunn. The GTD Drivers' Championship was led by Philip Ellis and Russell Ward with 2090 points. They sat 340 points ahead of second-placed Robby Foley and Patrick Gallagher in second. The Teams' Championships were led by Porsche Penske Motorsport, Riley, AO Racing, and Winward Racing, respectively, whilst the Manufacturers' Championships were led by Porsche in GTP and GTD Pro and Mercedes-AMG in GTD.

== Entry list ==
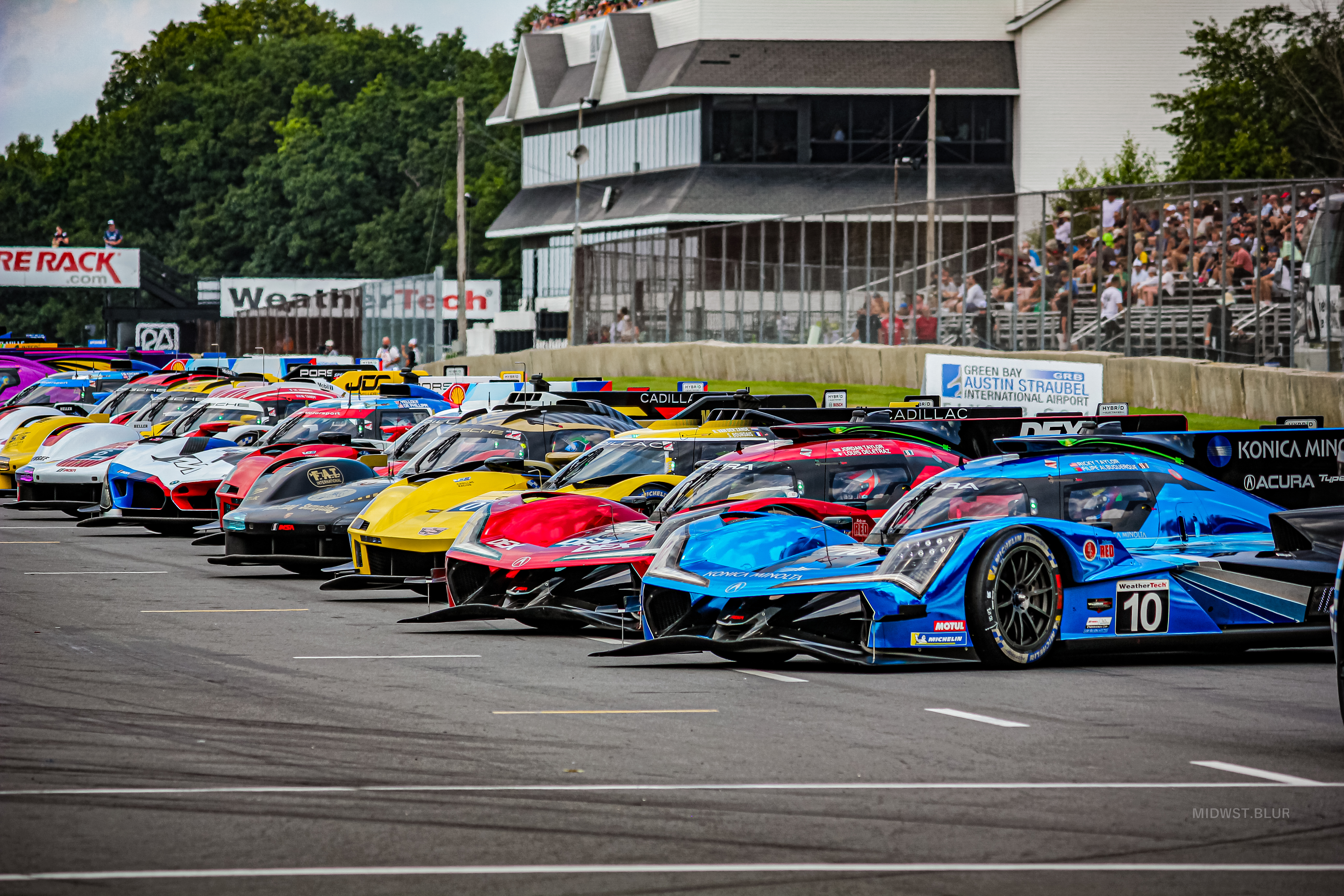
The GTP cars lined up before the race.

The entry list was revealed on July 24, 2024, and featured 47 entries: 10 entries in GTP, 12 entries in LMP2, 10 entries in GTD Pro, and 15 entries in GTD. The No. 04 CrowdStrike Racing by APR Oreca did not participate in the event after the CrowdStrike incident two weeks prior to the event. Furthermore, JDC–Miller MotorSports entered an additional Oreca in the LMP2 class for Scott Andrews and Gerry Knaut, whilst Tõnis Kasemets replaced Lance Willsey in the No. 33 Sean Creech Motorsport Ligier. For the second time this season, Conquest Racing fielded an additional car in the GTD Pro class: the No. 35 Ferrari was driven by Giacomo Altoè and Daniel Serra. The No. 120 Wright Motorsports Porsche returned to the GTD field after missing the previous round, whilst Triarsi Competizione fielded their No. 023 Ferrari for drivers Alessio Rovera and Onofrio Triarsi. Kenton Koch replaced Mike Skeen behind the wheel of the No. 32 Korthoff/Preston Motorsports Mercedes, whilst Sandy Mitchell replaced Kyle Marcelli behind the wheel of the No. 45 Wayne Taylor Racing with Andretti Lamborghini.

No.	Entrant	Car	Driver 1	Driver 2
GTP (Grand Touring Prototype) (10 entries)
01	(United States) Cadillac Racing	Cadillac V-Series.R	(France) Sébastien Bourdais	(Netherlands) Renger van der Zande
5	(Germany) Proton Competition Mustang Sampling	Porsche 963	(Italy) Gianmaria Bruni	(Netherlands) Bent Viscaal
6	(Germany) Porsche Penske Motorsport	Porsche 963	(France) Mathieu Jaminet	(United Kingdom) Nick Tandy
7	(Germany) Porsche Penske Motorsport	Porsche 963	(United States) Dane Cameron	(Brazil) Felipe Nasr
10	(United States) Wayne Taylor Racing with Andretti	Acura ARX-06	(Portugal) Filipe Albuquerque	(United States) Ricky Taylor
24	(United States) BMW M Team RLL	BMW M Hybrid V8	(Austria) Philipp Eng	(Finland) Jesse Krohn
25	(United States) BMW M Team RLL	BMW M Hybrid V8	(United States) Connor De Phillippi	(United Kingdom) Nick Yelloly
31	(United States) Whelen Cadillac Racing	Cadillac V-Series.R	(United Kingdom) Jack Aitken	(Brazil) Pipo Derani
40	(United States) Wayne Taylor Racing with Andretti	Acura ARX-06	(Switzerland) Louis Delétraz	(United States) Jordan Taylor
85	(United States) JDC–Miller MotorSports	Porsche 963	(Netherlands) Tijmen van der Helm	(United Kingdom) Richard Westbrook
LMP2 (Le Mans Prototype 2) (12 entries)
2	(United States) United Autosports USA	Oreca 07-Gibson	(United Kingdom) Ben Hanley	(United States) Ben Keating
8	(United States) Tower Motorsports	Oreca 07-Gibson	(Republic of Ireland) Charlie Eastwood	(Canada) John Farano
11	(France) TDS Racing	Oreca 07-Gibson	(Denmark) Mikkel Jensen	(United States) Steven Thomas
18	(United States) Era Motorsport	Oreca 07-Gibson	(United Kingdom) Ryan Dalziel	(United Kingdom) Stuart Wiltshire
20	(Denmark) MDK by High Class Racing	Oreca 07-Gibson	(Denmark) Dennis Andersen	(United States) Seth Lucas
22	(United States) United Autosports USA	Oreca 07-Gibson	(United States) Dan Goldburg	(United Kingdom) Paul di Resta
33	(United States) Sean Creech Motorsport	Ligier JS P217-Gibson	(Portugal) João Barbosa	(Estonia) Tõnis Kasemets
52	(Poland) Inter Europol by PR1/Mathiasen Motorsports	Oreca 07-Gibson	(United States) Nick Boulle	(France) Tom Dillmann
74	(United States) Riley	Oreca 07-Gibson	(Brazil) Felipe Fraga	(United States) Gar Robinson
79	(United States) JDC–Miller MotorSports	Oreca 07-Gibson	(Australia) Scott Andrews	(United States) Gerry Kraut
88	(Italy) Richard Mille AF Corse	Oreca 07-Gibson	(Argentina) Luis Pérez Companc	(Denmark) Nicklas Nielsen
99	(United States) AO Racing	Oreca 07-Gibson	(France) Paul-Loup Chatin	(United States) P. J. Hyett
GTD Pro (GT Daytona Pro) (10 entries)
1	(United States) Paul Miller Racing	BMW M4 GT3	(United States) Bryan Sellers	(United States) Madison Snow
3	(United States) Corvette Racing by Pratt Miller Motorsports	Chevrolet Corvette Z06 GT3.R	(Spain) Antonio García	(United Kingdom) Alexander Sims
4	(United States) Corvette Racing by Pratt Miller Motorsports	Chevrolet Corvette Z06 GT3.R	(Netherlands) Nicky Catsburg	(United States) Tommy Milner
9	(Canada) Pfaff Motorsports	McLaren 720S GT3 Evo	(United Kingdom) Oliver Jarvis	(Germany) Marvin Kirchhöfer
14	(United States) Vasser Sullivan	Lexus RC F GT3	(United Kingdom) Ben Barnicoat	(United Kingdom) Jack Hawksworth
23	(United States) Heart of Racing Team	Aston Martin Vantage AMR GT3 Evo	(United Kingdom) Ross Gunn	(Spain) Alex Riberas
35	(United States) Conquest Racing	Ferrari 296 GT3	(Italy) Giacomo Altoè	(Brazil) Daniel Serra
64	(Canada) Ford Multimatic Motorsports	Ford Mustang GT3	(Germany) Mike Rockenfeller	(United Kingdom) Harry Tincknell
65	(Canada) Ford Multimatic Motorsports	Ford Mustang GT3	(United States) Joey Hand	(Germany) Dirk Müller
77	(United States) AO Racing	Porsche 911 GT3 R (992)	(France) Julien Andlauer	(Germany) Laurin Heinrich
GTD (GT Daytona) (15 entries)
023	(United States) Triarsi Competizione	Ferrari 296 GT3	(Italy) Alessio Rovera	(United States) Onofrio Triarsi
12	(United States) Vasser Sullivan	Lexus RC F GT3	(United States) Frankie Montecalvo	(Canada) Parker Thompson
13	(Canada) AWA	Chevrolet Corvette Z06 GT3.R	(United Kingdom) Matt Bell	(Canada) Orey Fidani
27	(United States) Heart of Racing Team	Aston Martin Vantage AMR GT3 Evo	(Canada) Roman De Angelis	(Canada) Zacharie Robichon
32	(United States) Korthoff/Preston Motorsports	Mercedes-AMG GT3 Evo	(Canada) Mikaël Grenier	(United States) Kenton Koch
34	(United States) Conquest Racing	Ferrari 296 GT3	(Spain) Albert Costa	(United States) Manny Franco
45	(United States) Wayne Taylor Racing with Andretti	Lamborghini Huracán GT3 Evo 2	(Costa Rica) Danny Formal	(United Kingdom) Sandy Mitchell
55	(Germany) Proton Competition	Ford Mustang GT3	(Italy) Giammarco Levorato	(United States) Corey Lewis
57	(United States) Winward Racing	Mercedes-AMG GT3 Evo	(Switzerland) Philip Ellis	(United States) Russell Ward
66	(United States) Gradient Racing	Acura NSX GT3 Evo22	(United Kingdom) Stevan McAleer	(United States) Sheena Monk
70	(United Kingdom) Inception Racing	McLaren 720S GT3 Evo	(United States) Brendan Iribe	(Denmark) Frederik Schandorff
78	(United States) Forte Racing	Lamborghini Huracán GT3 Evo 2	(Canada) Misha Goikhberg	(Italy) Loris Spinelli
86	(United States) MDK Motorsports	Porsche 911 GT3 R (992)	(Denmark) Anders Fjordbach	[[Kerong Li| (China) ]] Kerong Li
96	(United States) Turner Motorsport	BMW M4 GT3	(United States) Robby Foley	(United States) Patrick Gallagher
120	(United States) Wright Motorsports	Porsche 911 GT3 R (992)	(United States) Adam Adelson	(United States) Elliott Skeer

== Practice ==
There were two practice sessions preceding the start of the race on Sunday, one on Friday afternoon and one on Saturday morning. The first session lasted 90 minutes on Friday afternoon while the second session on Saturday morning lasted 90 minutes.

== Qualifying ==
Saturday's afternoon qualifying session was broken into three sessions, with one session for the GTP, LMP2, GTD Pro and GTD classes, which lasted 15 minutes each. The rules dictated that all teams nominated a driver to qualify their cars, with the Pro-Am LMP2 class requiring a Bronze rated driver to qualify the car. The competitors' fastest lap times determined the starting order. IMSA then arranged the grid to put GTPs ahead of the LMP2, GTD Pro, and GTD cars.

=== Qualifying results ===
Pole positions in each class are indicated in bold and with ‡.

Pos.	Class	No.	Entry	Driver	Time	Gap	Grid
1	**GTP**	**10**	**(United States) Wayne Taylor Racing with Andretti**	**(Portugal) Filipe Albuquerque**	**1:48.601**	—	1‡
2	GTP	40	(United States) Wayne Taylor Racing with Andretti	(United States) Jordan Taylor	1:48.863	+0.262	2
3	GTP	01	(United States) Cadillac Racing	(Netherlands) Renger van der Zande	1:48.920	+0.319	3
4	GTP	5	(Germany) Proton Competition Mustang Sampling	(Italy) Gianmaria Bruni	1:49.392	+0.791	4
5	GTP	31	(United States) Whelen Cadillac Racing	(Brazil) Pipo Derani	1:49.408	+0.807	5
6	GTP	25	(United States) BMW M Team RLL	(United States) Connor De Phillippi	1:49.445	+0.844	6
7	GTP	6	(Germany) Porsche Penske Motorsport	(United Kingdom) Nick Tandy	1:49.465	+0.864	7
8	GTP	85	(United States) JDC–Miller MotorSports	(United Kingdom) Richard Westbrook	1:49.745	+1.144	8
9	GTP	7	(Germany) Porsche Penske Motorsport	(United States) Dane Cameron	1:49.976	+1.375	9
10	**LMP2**	**99**	**(United States) AO Racing**	**(United States) P. J. Hyett**	**1:53.738**	**+5.137**	11‡
11	LMP2	2	(United States) United Autosports USA	(United States) Ben Keating	1:54.110	+5.509	12
12	LMP2	22	(United States) United Autosports USA	(United States) Dan Goldburg	1:54.129	+5.528	13
13	LMP2	52	(Poland) Inter Europol by PR1/Mathiasen Motorsports	(United States) Nick Boulle	1:54.303	+5.702	14
14	LMP2	88	(Italy) Richard Mille AF Corse	(Argentina) Luis Pérez Companc	1:54.317	+5.716	15
15	LMP2	11	(France) TDS Racing	(United States) Steven Thomas	1:54.688	+6.087	16
16	LMP2	20	(Denmark) MDK by High Class Racing	(Denmark) Dennis Andersen	1:55.459	+6.858	17
17	LMP2	33	(United States) Sean Creech Motorsport	(Estonia) Tõnis Kasemets	1:55.662	+7.061	18
18	LMP2	74	(United States) Riley	(United States) Gar Robinson	1:56.322	+7.721	22^{1}
19	LMP2	8	(United States) Tower Motorsports	(Canada) John Farano	1:58.055	+9.454	19
20	LMP2	79	(United States) JDC–Miller MotorSports	(United States) Gerry Kraut	1:58.333	+9.732	20
21	LMP2	18	(United States) Era Motorsport	(United Kingdom) Stuart Wiltshire	1:58.536	+9.935	21
22	**GTD Pro**	**4**	**(United States) Corvette Racing by Pratt Miller Motorsports**	**(Netherlands) Nicky Catsburg**	**2:02.198**	**+13.597**	23‡
23	GTD Pro	3	(United States) Corvette Racing by Pratt Miller Motorsports	(United Kingdom) Alexander Sims	2:02.392	+13.791	24
24	GTD Pro	35	(United States) Conquest Racing	(Italy) Giacomo Altoè	2:02.729	+14.128	25
25	GTD Pro	14	(United States) Vasser Sullivan	(United Kingdom) Jack Hawksworth	2:02.912	+14.311	26
26	GTD Pro	64	(Canada) Ford Multimatic Motorsports	(Germany) Mike Rockenfeller	2:02.913	+14.312	27
27	GTD Pro	9	(Canada) Pfaff Motorsports	(United Kingdom) Oliver Jarvis	2:03.023	+14.422	28
28	GTD Pro	1	(United States) Paul Miller Racing	(United States) Madison Snow	2:03.363	+14.762	29
29	GTD Pro	23	(United States) Heart of Racing Team	(Spain) Alex Riberas	2:03.384	+14.783	30
30	GTD Pro	65	(Canada) Ford Multimatic Motorsports	(Germany) Dirk Müller	2:03.443	+14.842	31
31	GTD Pro	77	(United States) AO Racing	(France) Julien Andlauer	2:03.588	+14.987	32
32	**GTD**	**32**	**(United States) Korthoff/Preston Motorsports**	**(Canada) Mikaël Grenier**	**2:03.634**	**+15.033**	33‡
33	GTD	27	(United States) Heart of Racing Team	(Canada) Zacharie Robichon	2:03.764	+15.163	34
34	GTD	023	(United States) Triarsi Competizione	(United States) Onofrio Triarsi	2:03.841	+15.240	35
35	GTD	96	(United States) Turner Motorsport	(United States) Patrick Gallagher	2:03.981	+15.380	36
36	GTD	57	(United States) Winward Racing	(United States) Russell Ward	2:04.150	+15.549	37
37	GTD	45	(United States) Wayne Taylor Racing with Andretti	(Costa Rica) Danny Formal	2:04.276	+15.675	38
38	GTD	55	(Germany) Proton Competition	(Italy) Giammarco Levorato	2:04.303	+15.702	39
39	GTD	34	(United States) Conquest Racing	(United States) Manny Franco	2:04.304	+15.703	40
40	GTD	12	(United States) Vasser Sullivan	(United States) Frankie Montecalvo	2:04.369	+15.768	41
41	GTD	70	(United Kingdom) Inception Racing	(United States) Brendan Iribe	2:04.529	+15.928	42
42	GTD	78	(United States) Forte Racing	(Canada) Misha Goikhberg	2:04.877	+16.276	43
43	GTD	120	(United States) Wright Motorsports	(United States) Adam Adelson	2:05.194	+16.593	44
44	GTD	66	(United States) Gradient Racing	(United States) Sheena Monk	2:05.720	+17.119	45
45	GTD	86	(United States) MDK Motorsports	(China) Kerong Li	2:06.509	+17.908	46
46	GTD	13	(Canada) AWA	(Canada) Orey Fidani	2:07.340	+18.739	47
47	GTP	24	(United States) BMW M Team RLL	No Time Established			10
Sources:

- ^{1} The No. 74 Riley entry was moved to the back of its class after changing the engine of the car.

== Post-race ==
The result kept Cameron and Nasr atop the GTP Drivers' Championship with 2386 points while race winners Jaminet and Tandy advanced to second. As a result of finishing seventh, Boulle and Dillmann took the lead of the LMP2 Drivers' Championship. Hanley and Keating jumped from sixth to fourth. The final results of GTD Pro meant Heinrich continued to lead the Drivers' Championship, but his advantage was reduced to 76 points by third-place finisher Gunn. Ellis and Ward's fourth-place finish allowed them to keep their advantage over race finishers Foley and Gallagher in the GTD Drivers' Championship. Porsche and Mercedes-AMG continued to top their respective Manufacturers' Championships. Porsche Penske Motorsport, AO Racing, and Winward Racing kept their respective advantages in their of Teams' Championships while Inter Europol by PR1/Mathiasen Motorsports became the leader of the LMP2 Teams' Championship with three rounds remaining.

Class winners are in bold and ‡.

Pos	Class	No	Team	Drivers	Chassis	Laps	Time/Retired
Pos	Class	No	Team	Drivers	Engine	Laps	Time/Retired
1	**GTP**	**6**	**(Germany) Porsche Penske Motorsport**	**(France) Mathieu Jaminet (United Kingdom) Nick Tandy**	**Porsche 963**	**62**	**2:40:44.592‡**
1	**GTP**	**6**	**(Germany) Porsche Penske Motorsport**	**(France) Mathieu Jaminet (United Kingdom) Nick Tandy**	**Porsche 9RD 4.6 L twin-turbo V8**	**62**	**2:40:44.592‡**
2	GTP	7	(Germany) Porsche Penske Motorsport	(United States) Dane Cameron (Brazil) Felipe Nasr	Porsche 963	62	+0.390
2	GTP	7	(Germany) Porsche Penske Motorsport	(United States) Dane Cameron (Brazil) Felipe Nasr	Porsche 9RD 4.6 L twin-turbo V8	62	+0.390
3	GTP	10	(United States) Wayne Taylor Racing with Andretti	(Portugal) Filipe Albuquerque (United States) Ricky Taylor	Acura ARX-06	62	+1.150
3	GTP	10	(United States) Wayne Taylor Racing with Andretti	(Portugal) Filipe Albuquerque (United States) Ricky Taylor	Acura AR24e 2.4 L twin-turbo V6	62	+1.150
4	GTP	31	(United States) Whelen Cadillac Racing	(United Kingdom) Jack Aitken (Brazil) Pipo Derani	Cadillac V-Series.R	62	+1.449
4	GTP	31	(United States) Whelen Cadillac Racing	(United Kingdom) Jack Aitken (Brazil) Pipo Derani	Cadillac LMC55R 5.5 L V8	62	+1.449
5	GTP	5	(Germany) Proton Competition Mustang Sampling	(Italy) Gianmaria Bruni (Netherlands) Bent Viscaal	Porsche 963	62	+10.084
5	GTP	5	(Germany) Proton Competition Mustang Sampling	(Italy) Gianmaria Bruni (Netherlands) Bent Viscaal	Porsche 9RD 4.6 L twin-turbo V8	62	+10.084
6	GTP	85	(United States) JDC–Miller MotorSports	(Netherlands) Tijmen van der Helm (United Kingdom) Richard Westbrook	Porsche 963	62	+10.904
6	GTP	85	(United States) JDC–Miller MotorSports	(Netherlands) Tijmen van der Helm (United Kingdom) Richard Westbrook	Porsche 9RD 4.6 L twin-turbo V8	62	+10.904
7	GTP	24	(United States) BMW M Team RLL	(Austria) Philipp Eng (Finland) Jesse Krohn	BMW M Hybrid V8	62	+11.186
7	GTP	24	(United States) BMW M Team RLL	(Austria) Philipp Eng (Finland) Jesse Krohn	BMW P66/3 4.0 L twin-turbo V8	62	+11.186
8	GTP	40	(United States) Wayne Taylor Racing with Andretti	(Switzerland) Louis Delétraz (United States) Jordan Taylor	Acura ARX-06	62	+12.286
8	GTP	40	(United States) Wayne Taylor Racing with Andretti	(Switzerland) Louis Delétraz (United States) Jordan Taylor	Acura AR24e 2.4 L twin-turbo V6	62	+12.286
9	**LMP2**	**2**	**(United States) United Autosports USA**	**(United Kingdom) Ben Hanley (United States) Ben Keating**	**Oreca 07**	**62**	**+15.415‡**
9	**LMP2**	**2**	**(United States) United Autosports USA**	**(United Kingdom) Ben Hanley (United States) Ben Keating**	**Gibson GK428 4.2 L V8**	**62**	**+15.415‡**
10	LMP2	79	(United States) JDC–Miller MotorSports	(Australia) Scott Andrews (United States) Gerry Kraut	Oreca 07	62	+22.100
10	LMP2	79	(United States) JDC–Miller MotorSports	(Australia) Scott Andrews (United States) Gerry Kraut	Gibson GK428 4.2 L V8	62	+22.100
11	LMP2	99	(United States) AO Racing	(France) Paul-Loup Chatin (United States) P. J. Hyett	Oreca 07	62	+25.351
11	LMP2	99	(United States) AO Racing	(France) Paul-Loup Chatin (United States) P. J. Hyett	Gibson GK428 4.2 L V8	62	+25.351
12	LMP2	18	(United States) Era Motorsport	(United Kingdom) Ryan Dalziel (United Kingdom) Stuart Wiltshire	Oreca 07	62	+25.851
12	LMP2	18	(United States) Era Motorsport	(United Kingdom) Ryan Dalziel (United Kingdom) Stuart Wiltshire	Gibson GK428 4.2 L V8	62	+25.851
13	LMP2	88	(Italy) Richard Mille AF Corse	(Argentina) Luis Pérez Companc (Denmark) Nicklas Nielsen	Oreca 07	62	+27.165
13	LMP2	88	(Italy) Richard Mille AF Corse	(Argentina) Luis Pérez Companc (Denmark) Nicklas Nielsen	Gibson GK428 4.2 L V8	62	+27.165
14	LMP2	8	(United States) Tower Motorsports	(Republic of Ireland) Charlie Eastwood (Canada) John Farano	Oreca 07	62	+31.045
14	LMP2	8	(United States) Tower Motorsports	(Republic of Ireland) Charlie Eastwood (Canada) John Farano	Gibson GK428 4.2 L V8	62	+31.045
15	LMP2	52	(Poland) Inter Europol by PR1/Mathiasen Motorsports	(United States) Nick Boulle (France) Tom Dillmann	Oreca 07	62	+31.359
15	LMP2	52	(Poland) Inter Europol by PR1/Mathiasen Motorsports	(United States) Nick Boulle (France) Tom Dillmann	Gibson GK428 4.2 L V8	62	+31.359
16	LMP2	33	(United States) Sean Creech Motorsport	(Portugal) João Barbosa (Estonia) Tõnis Kasemets	Ligier JS P217	62	+40.012
16	LMP2	33	(United States) Sean Creech Motorsport	(Portugal) João Barbosa (Estonia) Tõnis Kasemets	Gibson GK428 4.2 L V8	62	+40.012
17	LMP2	20	(Denmark) MDK by High Class Racing	(Denmark) Dennis Andersen (United States) Seth Lucas	Oreca 07	62	+1:05.904
17	LMP2	20	(Denmark) MDK by High Class Racing	(Denmark) Dennis Andersen (United States) Seth Lucas	Gibson GK428 4.2 L V8	62	+1:05.904
18	LMP2	74	(United States) Riley	(Brazil) Felipe Fraga (United States) Gar Robinson	Oreca 07	62	+1:09.662
18	LMP2	74	(United States) Riley	(Brazil) Felipe Fraga (United States) Gar Robinson	Gibson GK428 4.2 L V8	62	+1:09.662
19	LMP2	22	(United States) United Autosports USA	(United States) Dan Goldburg (United Kingdom) Paul di Resta	Oreca 07	62	+1:44.835
19	LMP2	22	(United States) United Autosports USA	(United States) Dan Goldburg (United Kingdom) Paul di Resta	Gibson GK428 4.2 L V8	62	+1:44.835
20	GTP	01	(United States) Cadillac Racing	(France) Sébastien Bourdais (Netherlands) Renger van der Zande	Cadillac V-Series.R	61	+1 Lap
20	GTP	01	(United States) Cadillac Racing	(France) Sébastien Bourdais (Netherlands) Renger van der Zande	Cadillac LMC55R 5.5 L V8	61	+1 Lap
21	**GTD Pro**	**35**	**(United States) Conquest Racing**	**(Italy) Giacomo Altoè (Brazil) Daniel Serra**	**Ferrari 296 GT3**	**61**	**+1 Lap‡**
21	**GTD Pro**	**35**	**(United States) Conquest Racing**	**(Italy) Giacomo Altoè (Brazil) Daniel Serra**	**Ferrari F163 3.0 L Turbo V6**	**61**	**+1 Lap‡**
22	GTD Pro	1	(United States) Paul Miller Racing	(United States) Bryan Sellers (United States) Madison Snow	BMW M4 GT3	61	+1 Lap
22	GTD Pro	1	(United States) Paul Miller Racing	(United States) Bryan Sellers (United States) Madison Snow	BMW P58 3.0 L Turbo I6	61	+1 Lap
23	GTD Pro	23	(United States) Heart of Racing Team	(United Kingdom) Ross Gunn (Spain) Alex Riberas	Aston Martin Vantage AMR GT3 Evo	61	+1 Lap
23	GTD Pro	23	(United States) Heart of Racing Team	(United Kingdom) Ross Gunn (Spain) Alex Riberas	Aston Martin M177 4.0 L Turbo V8	61	+1 Lap
24	**GTD**	**96**	**(United States) Turner Motorsport**	**(United States) Robby Foley (United States) Patrick Gallagher**	**BMW M4 GT3**	**60**	**+2 Laps‡**
24	**GTD**	**96**	**(United States) Turner Motorsport**	**(United States) Robby Foley (United States) Patrick Gallagher**	**BMW P58 3.0 L Turbo I6**	**60**	**+2 Laps‡**
25	GTD	70	(United Kingdom) Inception Racing	(United States) Brendan Iribe (Denmark) Frederik Schandorff	McLaren 720S GT3 Evo	60	+2 Laps
25	GTD	70	(United Kingdom) Inception Racing	(United States) Brendan Iribe (Denmark) Frederik Schandorff	McLaren M840T 4.0 L Turbo V8	60	+2 Laps
26	GTD Pro	77	(United States) AO Racing	(France) Julien Andlauer (Germany) Laurin Heinrich	Porsche 911 GT3 R (992)	60	+2 Laps
26	GTD Pro	77	(United States) AO Racing	(France) Julien Andlauer (Germany) Laurin Heinrich	Porsche M97/80 4.2 L Flat-6	60	+2 Laps
27	GTD Pro	3	(United States) Corvette Racing by Pratt Miller Motorsports	(Spain) Antonio García (United Kingdom) Alexander Sims	Chevrolet Corvette Z06 GT3.R	60	+2 Laps
27	GTD Pro	3	(United States) Corvette Racing by Pratt Miller Motorsports	(Spain) Antonio García (United Kingdom) Alexander Sims	Chevrolet LT6 5.5 L V8	60	+2 Laps
28	GTD Pro	4	(United States) Corvette Racing by Pratt Miller Motorsports	(Netherlands) Nicky Catsburg (United States) Tommy Milner	Chevrolet Corvette Z06 GT3.R	60	+2 Laps
28	GTD Pro	4	(United States) Corvette Racing by Pratt Miller Motorsports	(Netherlands) Nicky Catsburg (United States) Tommy Milner	Chevrolet LT6 5.5 L V8	60	+2 Laps
29	GTD	66	(United States) Gradient Racing	(United Kingdom) Stevan McAleer (United States) Sheena Monk	Acura NSX GT3 Evo22	60	+2 Laps
29	GTD	66	(United States) Gradient Racing	(United Kingdom) Stevan McAleer (United States) Sheena Monk	Acura JNC1 3.5 L Turbo V6	60	+2 Laps
30	GTD	57	(United States) Winward Racing	(Switzerland) Philip Ellis (United States) Russell Ward	Mercedes-AMG GT3 Evo	60	+2 Laps
30	GTD	57	(United States) Winward Racing	(Switzerland) Philip Ellis (United States) Russell Ward	Mercedes-AMG M159 6.2 L V8	60	+2 Laps
31	GTD	13	(Canada) AWA	(United Kingdom) Matt Bell (Canada) Orey Fidani	Chevrolet Corvette Z06 GT3.R	60	+2 Laps
31	GTD	13	(Canada) AWA	(United Kingdom) Matt Bell (Canada) Orey Fidani	Chevrolet LT6 5.5 L V8	60	+2 Laps
32	GTD	34	(United States) Conquest Racing	(Spain) Albert Costa (United States) Manny Franco	Ferrari 296 GT3	60	+2 Laps
32	GTD	34	(United States) Conquest Racing	(Spain) Albert Costa (United States) Manny Franco	Ferrari F163 3.0 L Turbo V6	60	+2 Laps
33	GTD	32	(United States) Korthoff/Preston Motorsports	(Canada) Mikaël Grenier (United States) Kenton Koch	Mercedes-AMG GT3 Evo	60	+2 Laps
33	GTD	32	(United States) Korthoff/Preston Motorsports	(Canada) Mikaël Grenier (United States) Kenton Koch	Mercedes-AMG M159 6.2 L V8	60	+2 Laps
34	GTD Pro	9	(Canada) Pfaff Motorsports	(United Kingdom) Oliver Jarvis (Germany) Marvin Kirchhöfer	McLaren 720S GT3 Evo	60	+2 Laps
34	GTD Pro	9	(Canada) Pfaff Motorsports	(United Kingdom) Oliver Jarvis (Germany) Marvin Kirchhöfer	McLaren M840T 4.0 L Turbo V8	60	+2 Laps
35	GTD	55	(Germany) Proton Competition	(Italy) Giammarco Levorato (United States) Corey Lewis	Ford Mustang GT3	60	+2 Laps
35	GTD	55	(Germany) Proton Competition	(Italy) Giammarco Levorato (United States) Corey Lewis	Ford Coyote 5.4 L V8	60	+2 Laps
36	GTD Pro	65	(Canada) Ford Multimatic Motorsports	(United States) Joey Hand (Germany) Dirk Müller	Ford Mustang GT3	60	+2 Laps
36	GTD Pro	65	(Canada) Ford Multimatic Motorsports	(United States) Joey Hand (Germany) Dirk Müller	Ford Coyote 5.4 L V8	60	+2 Laps
37	GTD	27	(United States) Heart of Racing Team	(Canada) Roman De Angelis (Canada) Zacharie Robichon	Aston Martin Vantage AMR GT3 Evo	60	+2 Laps
37	GTD	27	(United States) Heart of Racing Team	(Canada) Roman De Angelis (Canada) Zacharie Robichon	Aston Martin M177 4.0 L Turbo V8	60	+2 Laps
38	GTD	86	(United States) MDK Motorsports	(Denmark) Anders Fjordbach (China) Kerong Li	Porsche 911 GT3 R (992)	60	+2 Laps
38	GTD	86	(United States) MDK Motorsports	(Denmark) Anders Fjordbach (China) Kerong Li	Porsche M97/80 4.2 L Flat-6	60	+2 Laps
39	GTD	12	(United States) Vasser Sullivan	(United States) Frankie Montecalvo (Canada) Parker Thompson	Lexus RC F GT3	60	+2 Laps
39	GTD	12	(United States) Vasser Sullivan	(United States) Frankie Montecalvo (Canada) Parker Thompson	Toyota 2UR-GSE 5.0 L V8	60	+2 Laps
40	GTD Pro	14	(United States) Vasser Sullivan	(United Kingdom) Ben Barnicoat (United Kingdom) Jack Hawksworth	Lexus RC F GT3	60	+2 Laps
40	GTD Pro	14	(United States) Vasser Sullivan	(United Kingdom) Ben Barnicoat (United Kingdom) Jack Hawksworth	Toyota 2UR-GSE 5.0 L V8	60	+2 Laps
41 DNF	GTD	023	(United States) Triarsi Competizione	(Italy) Alessio Rovera (United States) Onofrio Triarsi	Ferrari 296 GT3	57	Did not finish
41 DNF	GTD	023	(United States) Triarsi Competizione	(Italy) Alessio Rovera (United States) Onofrio Triarsi	Ferrari F163 3.0 L Turbo V6	57	Did not finish
42	GTD Pro	64	(Canada) Ford Multimatic Motorsports	(Germany) Mike Rockenfeller (United Kingdom) Harry Tincknell	Ford Mustang GT3	53	+9 Laps
42	GTD Pro	64	(Canada) Ford Multimatic Motorsports	(Germany) Mike Rockenfeller (United Kingdom) Harry Tincknell	Ford Coyote 5.4 L V8	53	+9 Laps
43 DNF	GTD	120	(United States) Wright Motorsports	(United States) Adam Adelson (United States) Elliott Skeer	Porsche 911 GT3 R (992)	46	Did not finish
43 DNF	GTD	120	(United States) Wright Motorsports	(United States) Adam Adelson (United States) Elliott Skeer	Porsche M97/80 4.2 L Flat-6	46	Did not finish
44 DNF	GTD	78	(United States) Forte Racing	(Canada) Misha Goikhberg (Italy) Loris Spinelli	Lamborghini Huracán GT3 Evo 2	45	Did not finish
44 DNF	GTD	78	(United States) Forte Racing	(Canada) Misha Goikhberg (Italy) Loris Spinelli	Lamborghini DGF 5.2 L V10	45	Did not finish
45	GTD	45	(United States) Wayne Taylor Racing with Andretti	(Costa Rica) Danny Formal (United Kingdom) Sandy Mitchell	Lamborghini Huracán GT3 Evo 2	35	+27 Laps
45	GTD	45	(United States) Wayne Taylor Racing with Andretti	(Costa Rica) Danny Formal (United Kingdom) Sandy Mitchell	Lamborghini DGF 5.2 L V10	35	+27 Laps
46 DNF	GTP	25	(United States) BMW M Team RLL	(United States) Connor De Phillippi (United Kingdom) Nick Yelloly	BMW M Hybrid V8	29	Did not finish
46 DNF	GTP	25	(United States) BMW M Team RLL	(United States) Connor De Phillippi (United Kingdom) Nick Yelloly	BMW P66/3 4.0 L twin-turbo V8	29	Did not finish
47 DNF	LMP2	11	(France) TDS Racing	(Denmark) Mikkel Jensen (United States) Steven Thomas	Oreca 07	27	Did not finish
47 DNF	LMP2	11	(France) TDS Racing	(Denmark) Mikkel Jensen (United States) Steven Thomas	Gibson GK428 4.2 L V8	27	Did not finish

== Standings after the race ==
GTP Drivers' Championship standings
Pos.	+/–	Driver	Points
1		(United States) Dane Cameron (Brazil) Felipe Nasr	2386
2	1	(France) Mathieu Jaminet (United Kingdom) Nick Tandy	2286
3	1	(France) Sébastien Bourdais (Netherlands) Renger van der Zande	2201
4	1	(United Kingdom) Jack Aitken (Brazil) Pipo Derani	2144
5	1	(Switzerland) Louis Delétraz (United States) Jordan Taylor	2107

LMP2 Drivers' Championship standings
Pos.	+/–	Driver	Points
1	1	(United States) Nick Boulle (France) Tom Dillmann	1564
2	1	(Brazil) Felipe Fraga (United States) Gar Robinson	1537
3		(United Kingdom) Ryan Dalziel	1473
4	2	(United Kingdom) Ben Hanley (United States) Ben Keating	1467
5	1	(United States) Dan Goldburg	1372

GTD Pro Drivers' Championship standings
Pos.	+/–	Driver	Points
1		(Germany) Laurin Heinrich	2256
2		(United Kingdom) Ross Gunn	2180
3		(United Kingdom) Ben Barnicoat (United Kingdom) Jack Hawksworth	2083
4		(Spain) Antonio García (United Kingdom) Alexander Sims	2066
5		(United States) Bryan Sellers (United States) Madison Snow	2023

GTD Drivers' Championship standings
Pos.	+/–	Driver	Points
1		(Switzerland) Philip Ellis (United States) Russell Ward	2396
2		(United States) Robby Foley (United States) Patrick Gallagher	2128
3		(Canada) Parker Thompson	1870
4		(Canada) Mikaël Grenier	1796
5		(Spain) Albert Costa (United States) Manny Franco	1781

- Note: Only the top five positions are included for all sets of standings.

GTP Teams' Championship standings
Pos.	+/–	Team	Points
1		#7 Porsche Penske Motorsport	2386
2	1	#6 Porsche Penske Motorsport	2286
3	1	#01 Cadillac Racing	2201
4	1	#31 Whelen Cadillac Racing	2144
5	1	#40 Wayne Taylor Racing with Andretti	2107

LMP2 Teams' Championship standings
Pos.	+/–	Team	Points
1	1	#52 Inter Europol by PR1/Mathiasen Motorsports	1564
2	1	#74 Riley	1537
3		#18 Era Motorsport	1473
4	2	#2 United Autosports USA	1467
5	1	#22 United Autosports USA	1372

GTD Pro Teams' Championship standings
Pos.	+/–	Team	Points
1		#77 AO Racing	2256
2		#23 Heart of Racing Team	2180
3		#14 Vasser Sullivan	2083
4		#3 Corvette Racing by Pratt Miller Motorsports	2066
5		#1 Paul Miller Racing	2023

GTD Teams' Championship standings
Pos.	+/–	Team	Points
1		#57 Winward Racing	2396
2		#96 Turner Motorsport	2128
3		#32 Korthoff/Preston Motorsports	1796
4		#34 Conquest Racing	1781
5		#12 Vasser Sullivan	1677

- Note: Only the top five positions are included for all sets of standings.

GTP Manufacturers' Championship standings
Pos.	+/–	Manufacturer	Points
1		(Germany) Porsche	2555
2		(United States) Cadillac	2466
3		(Japan) Acura	2416
4		(Germany) BMW	2188
5		(Italy) Lamborghini	572

GTD Pro Manufacturers' Championship standings
Pos.	+/–	Manufacturer	Points
1		(Germany) Porsche	2304
2		(United Kingdom) Aston Martin	2216
3	1	(United States) Chevrolet	2154
4	1	(Japan) Lexus	2139
5		(United Kingdom) McLaren	2019

GTD Manufacturers' Championship standings
Pos.	+/–	Manufacturer	Points
1		(Germany) Mercedes-AMG	2500
2	1	(United Kingdom) Aston Martin	2027
3	1	(Japan) Lexus	2022
4	2	(Germany) BMW	1970
5		(Germany) Porsche	1963

- Note: Only the top five positions are included for all sets of standings.

IMSA SportsCar Championship
Previous race: Chevrolet Grand Prix	2024 season	Next race: Michelin GT Challenge at VIR
