= Danny Formal =

Costa Rican racing driver (born 1995)

Daniel Formal
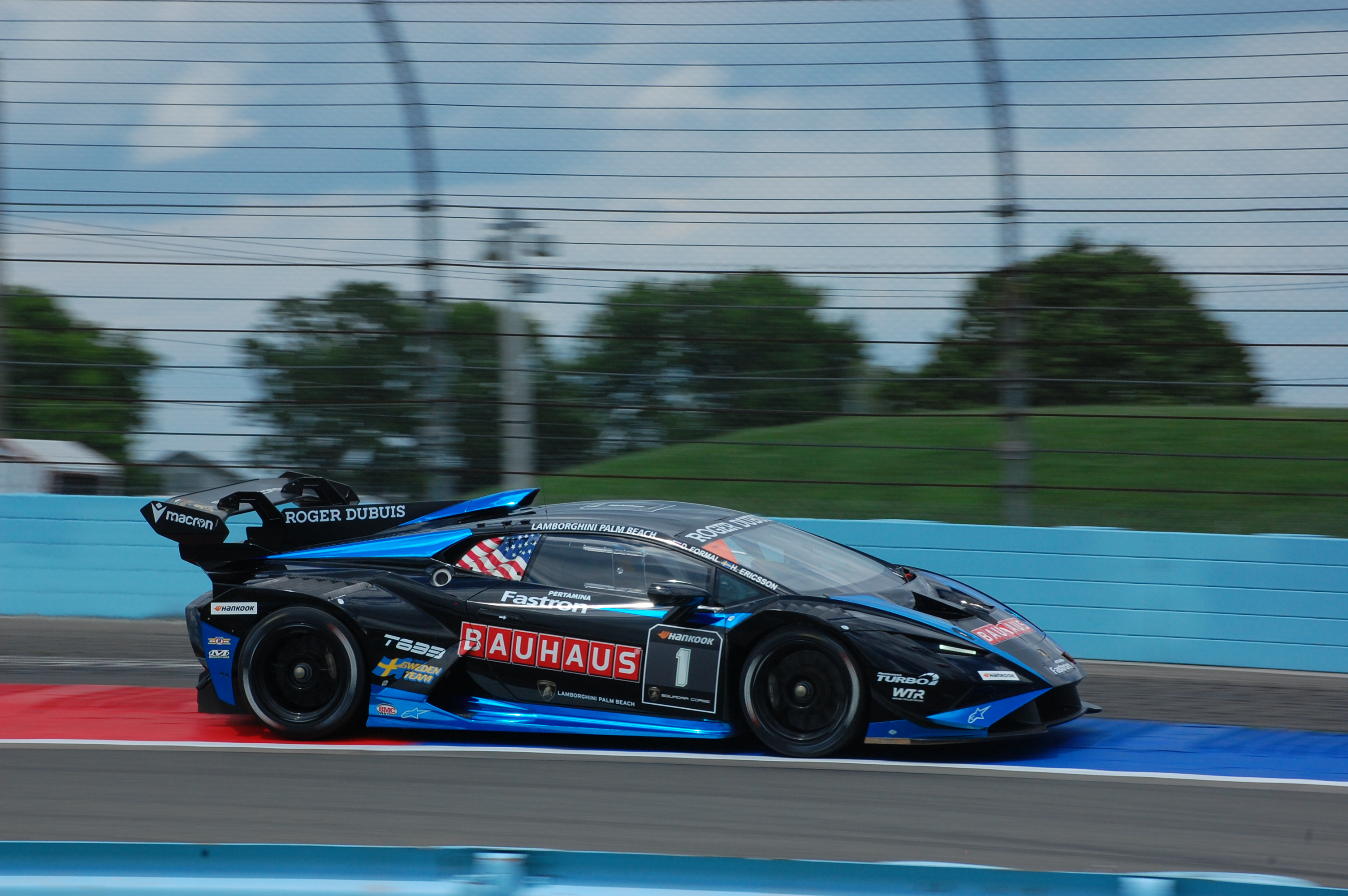
- Formal in 2025
- Nationality: (Costa Rica) Costa Rican (United States) American via double nationality
- Born: 24 December 1995 (age 30) San José, Costa Rica
- Categorisation: FIA Silver

Championship titles
- 2026 2025 2022–2023, 2025 2017: Lamborghini Super Trofeo North America – Pro-Am; Lamborghini Super Trofeo World Finals – Pro; Lamborghini Super Trofeo North America – Pro; Costa Rica Touring Car Championship

Daniel Formal (born 24 December 1995) is a Costa Rican racing driver who last competed for Wayne Taylor Racing in IMSA SportsCar Championship and Lamborghini Super Trofeo North America.

== Career ==
=== Karting ===
Formal began karting in 2004. In his early years in karting, Formal most notably won the 2008 USA Junior Rotax, and the Florida Winter Tour in both Rotax Junior and KF3. As he stepped up to senior classes, Formal won the 2012 and 2013 Florida Winter Tour in the TaG Senior class before making the switch to shifter karts in late 2013. In Shifter karts, Formal won four SKUSA SuperNationals titles in 2015 and 2016 in S1, 2019 in KZ, and 2023 in Pro Shifter. During his SKUSA SuperNationals titles, Formal also won the SKUSA Pro Tour in 2016 and the Biloxi Rok Fest in 2019.

=== GT Racing ===
Formal made his car racing debut in 2016 as he joined the Costa Rica Touring Car Championship. Racing for the Mitsubishi team, Formal was runner-up in his first ever year of car racing, but announced he would be leaving the team ahead of his sophomore season.

In 2017, Formal returned to the series as he switched to Hyundai alongside Erick Xirinachs. In his sophomore season in the championship, Formal won the last three races of the season to clinch the title by 67.5 points over Jose Montalto.

Having joined ANSA Motorsports in 2020 for their karting division, Formal later joined their Super Trofeo North America division to make his return to cars after three years. Formal took a lone class win at the season-ending round at Sebring as he ended the season fourth in the Pro-Am points.

Switching to Prestige Performance with WTR for 2021, Formal was joined by Kyle Marcelli for his second season in the series. The pair won both races at Road America, and race two at Laguna Seca as they finished fourth in points.

Remaining in Lamborghini Super Trofeo North America, Formal switched to Wayne Taylor Racing for his third season in the category. Driving alongside Kyle Marcelli, the pair won five races and took the title with one round left. During 2021, Formal also made his debut in Prototypes, racing in the IMSA Prototype Challenge on a part-time basis and also making a one-off appearance in the LMP3 class of the IMSA SportsCar Championship.

As Wayne Taylor Racing forged a partnership with Andretti Autosport, Formal remained in Lamborghini Super Trofeo North America, whilst also joining their Racers Edge Motorsport-supported GTD program in IMSA SportsCar Championship. In the former, Formal won ten of the 12 races on his way to his second consecutive Super Trofeo North America title. In IMSA, Formal scored a best result of sixth at the 24 Hours of Daytona as he ended the season 33rd in points.

Formal was retained by Wayne Taylor Racing with Andretti in 2024 as he competed in both Lamborghini Super Trofeo North America and the IMSA SportsCar Championship as Racers Edge Motorsport left the partnership. In his first full-season in GTD, Formal took his maiden series pole at Laguna Seca and scored a best result of fifth twice as he finished eighth in points. Racing as a Lamborghini Factory driver in Super Trofeo, Formal took wins at Watkins Glen International, Circuit of the Americas, and Jerez on his way to runner-up honors at season's end.

In 2025, Formal returned to Wayne Taylor Racing to race in both Lamborghini Super Trofeo North America and the IMSA SportsCar Championship. Driving alongside Trent Hindman in the former, the pair took the team's first GTD win at the fifth round of the season at Canadian Tire Motorsport Park and ended the year 12th in the class standings. Driving alongside Hampus Ericsson in the latter, the pair won seven races and scored two more podiums to secure the Pro title by 26 points, as well as the Super Trofeo World Finals Pro title at Misano.

The following year, Formal returned to Wayne Taylor Racing for his fourth season in the GTD class of the IMSA SportsCar Championship, as well as his seventh campaign in Lamborghini Super Trofeo North America, albeit in Pro-Am. In IMSA, Formal took his second series win at Laguna Seca to take 11th in the GTD standings. Teaming up with Graham Doyle in the Pro-Am class of the latter, Formal won all but two of the 12 races to secure his fourth class title in Lamborghini Super Trofeo North America.

== Karting record ==
=== Karting career summary ===
Season	Series	Team	Position
2004	WKA Florida Championship Series — Easykart 60cc		2nd
2005	WKA Florida Championship Series — Easykart 60cc		3rd
2005	Florida Winter Tour — Mini Max		5th
2005	Florida Winter Tour — Easykart 60cc		2nd
2005	Stars of Karting East – Cadet		22nd
2006	Florida Winter Tour — Mini Max		5th
2006	Stars of Karting National – Cadet	Tony Kart Racing Team	62nd
2007	Easykart International Grand Finals — Easykart 100		NC
2007	BTK / Arrows Karts – Rotax Junior		3rd
2008	Stars of Karting National – ICA Junior		17th
2008	Stars of Karting East – ICA Junior		12th
2008	Rotax Max Challenge U.S.A. – Junior Max		21st
2008	Rotax Max Challenge USA Grand Nationals – Junior Max		1st
2008	Florida Winter Tour – Rotax Junior	Advanced Karting of Miami	1st
2008	Florida Winter Tour – KF3	Advanced Karting of Miami	1st
2008	Florida Winter Tour – ICA Junior	Advanced Karting of Miami	2nd
2009	Jon Smith Kart Series – TaG Sr.		1st
2009	Florida Winter Tour – TaG Senior		10th
2010	Rotax Grand Nationals U.S.A. – Senior Max		3rd
2010	RMC Grand Finals – Senior Max		5th
2011	South Florida RMC Challenge – Rotax Senior		2nd
2011	Florida Winter Tour – Rotax Senior		3rd
2011	Rotax Grand Nationals U.S.A. – Senior Max		31st
2011	SKUSA SuperNationals – TaG Senior	Intrepid North America	2nd
2012	200 Miles of Newcastle	ZF Racing	31st
2012	Florida Winter Tour – TaG Senior		1st
2012	Florida Winter Tour – Rotax Senior		4th
2012	Rotax Max Challenge Grand Finals – Senior Max		15th
2012	WSK Euro Series – KZ2		15th
2012	SKUSA SuperNationals – TaG Senior	Advanced Karting	11th
2013	Florida Winter Tour – Rotax Senior		2nd
2013	Florida Winter Tour – TaG Senior		1st
2013	Rotax Max Challenge Grand Finals – DD2	Maxspeed Group	NC
2013	SKUSA SuperNationals – DD2		3rd
2014	SKUSA Pro Tour – S1		9th
2014	Florida Winter Tour – Rotax DD2		2nd
2014	Florida Winter Tour – TaG Senior		3rd
2014	Rotax Max Euro Challenge – DD2		18th
2014	Karting European Championship – KZ2		49th
2014	SKUSA SuperNationals – Pro Stock	DRT Racing	3rd
2014	SKUSA SuperNationals – TaG Senior	DRT Racing	12th
2015	SKUSA Pro Tour – S1		12th
2015	Florida Winter Tour – Rotax DD2		3rd
2015	SKUSA SuperNationals – S1	Champion Racing	1st
2016	Florida Winter Tour – Shifter Rok		2nd
2016	SKUSA Pro Tour – S1		1st
2016	SKUSA SuperNationals – S1 Pro Stock	DRT Racing	1st
2016	SKUSA SuperNationals – KZ2	DRT Racing	6th
2017	SKUSA Pro Tour – S1		12th
2017	SKUSA SuperNationals – S1 Pro	Champion Racing	6th
2017	SKUSA SuperNationals – KZ	Champion Racing	36th
2018	Florida Winter Tour – Shifter Rok		27th
2018	SKUSA Pro Tour – S1		18th
2018	Rotax Max Challenge Grand Finals – DD2	Formal Racing	2nd
2018	SKUSA SuperNationals – Pro Shifter	Formula K/Leading Edge Motorsports	4th
2019	SKUSA Pro Tour – Pro Shifter		22nd
2019	Rok Cup Superfinal – Shifter Rok		11th
2019	Florida Winter Tour – Shifter Rok	Leading Edge Motorsports	2nd
2019	Biloxi Rok Fest – Shifter Rok	Leading Edge Motorsports	1st
2019	SKUSA SuperNationals – KZ	Leading Edge Motorsports	1st
2020	SKUSA Pro Winter Series – Pro Shifter		NC
2020	SKUSA Pro Tour – Pro Shifter		4th
2020	Florida Winter Tour – Shifter Rok	ANSA Motorsports	2nd
2021	SKUSA Pro Tour – Pro Shifter		8th
2021	SKUSA SuperNationals – Pro Shifter	Leading Edge Motorsports	3rd
2022	SKUSA Pro Tour – Pro Shifter		32nd
2022	SKUSA SuperNationals – Pro Shifter	Rolison Performance Group	39th
2023	SKUSA Pro Tour – Pro Shifter		6th
2023	Rok Vegas – Pro Shifter	Rolison Performance Group	2nd
2023	SKUSA SuperNationals – Pro Shifter	Rolison Performance Group	1st
2024	SKUSA Pro Tour – Pro Shifter		2nd
2025	SKUSA Winter Series – Pro Shifter		4th

== Racing record ==
=== Racing career summary ===
Season	Series	Team	Races	Wins	Poles	F/Laps	Podiums	Points	Position
2016	Costa Rica Touring Car Championship		6	1	0	0	4	182	**2nd**
2017	Costa Rica Touring Car Championship		6	3	0	0	4	345.5	**1st**
2020	Lamborghini Super Trofeo North America – Pro-Am	ANSA Motorsports	8	1	3	2	7	70	4th
2020	Michelin Pilot Challenge – TC	Van Der Steur Racing LLC	1	0	0	0	0	19	30th
2021	Lamborghini Super Trofeo North America – Pro	Prestige Performance with WTR	9	3	2	2	6	67	4th
2022	Lamborghini Super Trofeo North America – Pro	Wayne Taylor Racing	12	5	0	0	11	153	**1st**
2022	IMSA Prototype Challenge	CT Motorsports LLC	3	0	0	0	0	630	18th
2022	IMSA SportsCar Championship – LMP3	Mühlner Motorsports America	1	0	0	0	0	231	36th
2023	IMSA SportsCar Championship – GTD	Racers Edge Motorsports with WTR Andretti	4	0	0	0	0	869	33th
2023	Lamborghini Super Trofeo North America – Pro	Wayne Taylor Racing with Andretti Autosport	12	10	5	6	12	92	**1st**
2023	Lamborghini Super Trofeo World Finals – Pro	Wayne Taylor Racing	2	0	0	0	0	5	10th
2024	IMSA SportsCar Championship – GTD	Wayne Taylor Racing with Andretti	10	0	1	0	0	2310	8th
2024	Lamborghini Super Trofeo North America – Pro	Wayne Taylor Racing with Andretti	12	3	4	4	7	129	**2nd**
2024	Lamborghini Super Trofeo World Finals – Pro	Wayne Taylor Racing with Andretti	2	0	0	0	0	5	9th
2024	Michelin Pilot Challenge – GS	Van Der Steur Racing	1	0	0	0	0	90	73rd
2025	IMSA SportsCar Championship – GTD	Wayne Taylor Racing	10	1	0	0	1	2274	12th
2025	Lamborghini Super Trofeo North America – Pro	Wayne Taylor Racing	12	7	7	3	9	148	**1st**
2025	Lamborghini Super Trofeo World Finals – Pro	Wayne Taylor Racing	2	1	1	0	1	22	**1st**
2026	IMSA SportsCar Championship – GTD	Wayne Taylor Racing	10	1	0	0	1	2215	11th
2026	Lamborghini Super Trofeo North America – Pro-Am	Wayne Taylor Racing	12	10	5	12	11	173	**1st**
2026	Lamborghini Super Trofeo World Finals – Pro	Wayne Taylor Racing	2	0	0	0	0	5	8th

=== Complete Michelin Pilot Challenge results ===
(key) (Races in bold indicate pole position) (Races in italics indicate fastest lap)

Year	Entrant	Class	Make	Engine	1	2	3	4	5	6	7	8	9	10	Rank	Points
2020	Van Der Steur Racing	TC	Hyundai Veloster N TCR	Hyundai 4.0 L Turbo I4	DAY	SEB1	ROA	VIR	MDO	ELK	ATL	LGA	SEB2; 12		30th	19
2024	Van Der Steur Racing	Grand Sport	Aston Martin Vantage AMR GT4	Aston Martin M177 4.0 L Twin-Turbo V8	DAY	SEB	LGA	MOH; 22	WGL	MOS	ELK	VIR	IMS	ATL	73rd	90

* Season still in progress.

=== Complete WeatherTech SportsCar Championship results ===
(key) (Races in bold indicate pole position; results in italics indicate fastest lap)

Year	Team	Class	Make	Engine	1	2	3	4	5	6	7	8	9	10	11	Pos.	Points
2022	Mühlner Motorsports America	LMP3	Duqueine M30 - D08	Nissan VK56DE 5.6 L V8	DAY	SEB	MDO	WGL; 10	MOS	ELK	PET					36th	231
2023	Racers Edge Motorsports with WTR Andretti	GTD	Acura NSX GT3 Evo22	Acura 3.5 L Turbo V6	DAY; 6	**SEB**; 19	LBH	MON	WGL; 8	MOS	LIM	ELK	VIR	IMS	PET; 14	33rd	869
2024	Wayne Taylor Racing with Andretti	GTD	Lamborghini Huracán GT3 Evo 2	Lamborghini 5.2 L V10	DAY; 17	SEB; 15	LBH; 8	**LGA**; 5	WGL; 12	MOS; 6	ELK; 15	VIR; 11	IMS; 10	PET; 5		8th	2310
2025	Wayne Taylor Racing	GTD	Lamborghini Huracán GT3 Evo 2	Lamborghini 5.2 L V10	DAY; 10	SEB; 14	LBH; 11	LGA; 18	WGL; 20	MOS; 1	ELK; 5	VIR; 13	IMS; 14	PET; 12		12th	2274
2026	Wayne Taylor Racing	GTD	Lamborghini Huracán GT3 Evo 2	Lamborghini 5.2 L V10	DAY; 8	SEB; 16	LBH; 17	LGA; 1	WGL; 20	MOS; 5	ELK; 12	VIR; 5	IMS; 13	PET; 16		11th	2215
