= 2024 Sahlen's Six Hours of The Glen =

Sixth round of the 2024 IMSA SportsCar Championship season

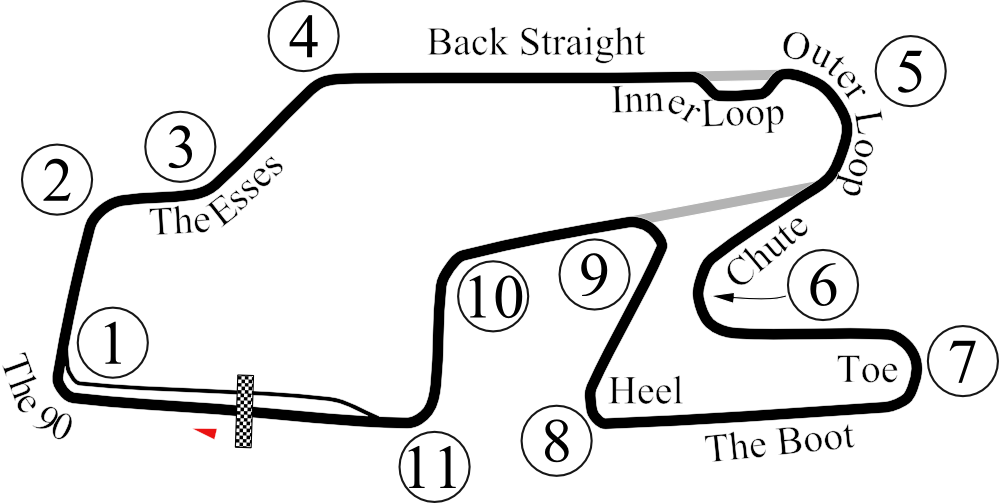
The layout of Watkins Glen International, where the race was held.

The 2024 Sahlen's Six Hours of The Glen was a sports car race held at Watkins Glen International in Dix, New York, on June 23, 2024. It was the sixth round of the 2024 IMSA SportsCar Championship, and the third round of the Michelin Endurance Cup.

== Background ==
=== Preview ===
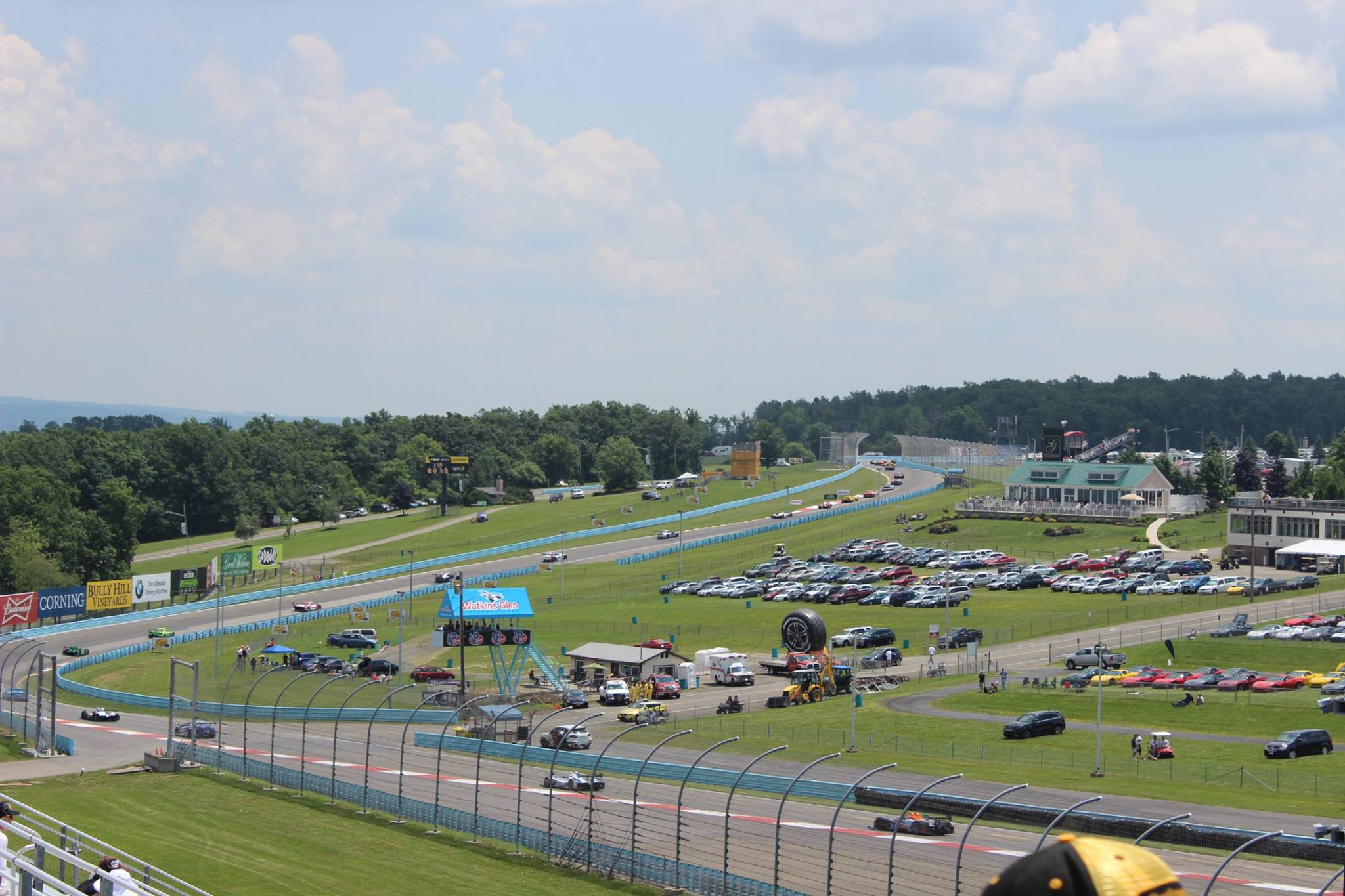
Watkins Glen International, where the race was held.

International Motor Sports Association (IMSA) president John Doonan confirmed the race was part of the 2024 IMSA SportsCar Championship (IMSA SCC) in August 2023. It was the tenth time the IMSA SCC hosted a race at Watkins Glen. The 2024 Sahlen's Six Hours of The Glen was the sixth of eleven scheduled sports car races of 2024 by IMSA. The race was held at the eleven-turn 3.450 mi (5.552 km) Watkins Glen International on June 23, 2024.

=== Standings before the race ===
Before the race, the GTP Drivers' Championship was led by Dane Cameron and Felipe Nasr with 1669 points, 70 ahead of second-placed Sébastien Bourdais and Renger van der Zande. Mathieu Jaminet and Nick Tandy were 83 points behind Cameron and Nasr in third place. Ryan Dalziel, Dwight Merriman, and Connor Zilisch were leading the LMP2 Drivers' Championship with 741 points, 127 points ahead of Josh Burdon, Felipe Fraga, and Gar Robinson in second. Laurin Heinrich and Sebastian Priaulx were on top in the GTD Pro Drivers' Championship with 1359 points, 84 ahead of Ben Barnicoat and Jack Hawksworth in second. Ross Gunn was a further 83 points behind in third place. The GTD Drivers' Championship was topped by Philip Ellis and Russell Ward with 1367 points, 213 ahead of second-placed Robby Foley and Patrick Gallagher. Porsche were leading the GTP and GTD Pro Manufacturers' Championships, whilst Mercedes-AMG were leading the GTD Manufacturers' Championship. Porsche Penske Motorsport, Era Motorsport, AO Racing, and Winward Racing were leading their Teams' Championships.

== Entry list ==
The entry list was revealed on June 12, 2024, and features 56 entries: 11 entries in GTP, 13 entries in LMP2, 11 entries in GTD Pro, and 21 entries in GTD.

No.	Entrant	Car	Driver 1	Driver 2	Driver 3
GTP (Grand Touring Prototype) (11 entries)
01	(United States) Cadillac Racing	Cadillac V-Series.R	(France) Sébastien Bourdais	(Netherlands) Renger van der Zande	
5	(Germany) Proton Competition Mustang Sampling	Porsche 963	(Italy) Gianmaria Bruni	(Netherlands) Bent Viscaal	
6	(Germany) Porsche Penske Motorsport	Porsche 963	(France) Mathieu Jaminet	(United Kingdom) Nick Tandy	
7	(Germany) Porsche Penske Motorsport	Porsche 963	(United States) Dane Cameron	(Brazil) Felipe Nasr	
10	(United States) Wayne Taylor Racing with Andretti	Acura ARX-06	(Portugal) Filipe Albuquerque	(United States) Ricky Taylor	
24	(United States) BMW M Team RLL	BMW M Hybrid V8	(Austria) Philipp Eng	(Finland) Jesse Krohn	
25	(United States) BMW M Team RLL	BMW M Hybrid V8	(United States) Connor De Phillippi	(United Kingdom) Nick Yelloly	
31	(United States) Whelen Cadillac Racing	Cadillac V-Series.R	(United Kingdom) Jack Aitken	(United Kingdom) Tom Blomqvist	(Brazil) Pipo Derani
40	(United States) Wayne Taylor Racing with Andretti	Acura ARX-06	(Switzerland) Louis Delétraz	(United States) Jordan Taylor	
63	(Italy) Lamborghini – Iron Lynx	Lamborghini SC63	(Italy) Matteo Cairoli	(Italy) Andrea Caldarelli	
85	(United States) JDC–Miller MotorSports	Porsche 963	(United Kingdom) Phil Hanson	(Netherlands) Tijmen van der Helm	(United Kingdom) Richard Westbrook
LMP2 (Le Mans Prototype 2) (13 entries)
04	(United States) CrowdStrike Racing by APR	Oreca 07-Gibson	(United States) Colin Braun	(United States) George Kurtz	(United Kingdom) Toby Sowery
2	(United States) United Autosports USA	Oreca 07-Gibson	(United Kingdom) Ben Hanley	(United States) Ben Keating	(Chile) Nico Pino
8	(United States) Tower Motorsports	Oreca 07-Gibson	(United States) Michael Dinan	(Republic of Ireland) Charlie Eastwood	(Canada) John Farano
11	(France) TDS Racing	Oreca 07-Gibson	(Denmark) Mikkel Jensen	(New Zealand) Hunter McElrea	(United States) Steven Thomas
18	(United States) Era Motorsport	Oreca 07-Gibson	(United Kingdom) Ryan Dalziel	(United States) Dwight Merriman	(United States) Connor Zilisch
20	(Denmark) MDK by High Class Racing	Oreca 07-Gibson	(Denmark) Dennis Andersen	(United States) Scott Huffaker	(United States) Seth Lucas
22	(United States) United Autosports USA	Oreca 07-Gibson	(United Kingdom) Paul di Resta	(United States) Bijoy Garg	(United States) Dan Goldburg
33	(United States) Sean Creech Motorsport	Ligier JS P217-Gibson	(Portugal) João Barbosa	(United Kingdom) Jonny Edgar	(United States) Lance Willsey
52	(Poland) Inter Europol by PR1/Mathiasen Motorsports	Oreca 07-Gibson	(United States) Nick Boulle	(France) Tom Dillmann	(Poland) Jakub Śmiechowski
74	(United States) Riley	Oreca 07-Gibson	(New Zealand) Josh Burdon	(Brazil) Felipe Fraga	(United States) Gar Robinson
81	(United States) DragonSpeed	Oreca 07-Gibson	(Sweden) Rasmus Lindh	(United States) Eric Lux	(Argentina) Nicolás Varrone
88	(Italy) Richard Mille AF Corse	Oreca 07-Gibson	(Denmark) Nicklas Nielsen	(Argentina) Luis Pérez Companc	(France) Lilou Wadoux
99	(United States) AO Racing	Oreca 07-Gibson	(Australia) Matthew Brabham	(France) Paul-Loup Chatin	(United States) P. J. Hyett
GTD Pro (GT Daytona Pro) (11 entries)
1	(United States) Paul Miller Racing	BMW M4 GT3	(United States) Bryan Sellers	(United States) Madison Snow	(United States) Neil Verhagen
3	(United States) Corvette Racing by Pratt Miller Motorsports	Chevrolet Corvette Z06 GT3.R	(Spain) Antonio García	(United Kingdom) Alexander Sims	
4	(United States) Corvette Racing by Pratt Miller Motorsports	Chevrolet Corvette Z06 GT3.R	(Netherlands) Nicky Catsburg	(United States) Tommy Milner	
9	(Canada) Pfaff Motorsports	McLaren 720S GT3 Evo	(United Kingdom) Oliver Jarvis	(Germany) Marvin Kirchhöfer	
14	(United States) Vasser Sullivan	Lexus RC F GT3	(United Kingdom) Ben Barnicoat	(United Kingdom) Jack Hawksworth	
19	(Italy) Iron Lynx	Lamborghini Huracán GT3 Evo 2	(South Africa) Jordan Pepper	(France) Franck Perera	
23	(United States) Heart of Racing Team	Aston Martin Vantage AMR GT3 Evo	(United Kingdom) Ross Gunn	(Spain) Alex Riberas	
62	(United States) Risi Competizione	Ferrari 296 GT3	(Italy) Davide Rigon	(Brazil) Daniel Serra	
64	(Canada) Ford Multimatic Motorsports	Ford Mustang GT3	(Germany) Mike Rockenfeller	(United Kingdom) Harry Tincknell	
65	(Canada) Ford Multimatic Motorsports	Ford Mustang GT3	(United States) Joey Hand	(Germany) Dirk Müller	
77	(United States) AO Racing	Porsche 911 GT3 R (992)	(Germany) Laurin Heinrich	(United Kingdom) Sebastian Priaulx	
GTD (GT Daytona) (21 entries)
023	(United States) Triarsi Competizione	Ferrari 296 GT3	(Italy) Alessio Rovera	(United States) Charlie Scardina	(United States) Onofrio Triarsi
12	(United States) Vasser Sullivan	Lexus RC F GT3	(United States) Frankie Montecalvo	(United States) Aaron Telitz	(Canada) Parker Thompson
13	(Canada) AWA	Chevrolet Corvette Z06 GT3.R	(United Kingdom) Matt Bell	(Canada) Orey Fidani	(Germany) Lars Kern
21	(Italy) AF Corse	Ferrari 296 GT3	(France) François Heriau	(United Kingdom) Simon Mann	(Spain) Miguel Molina
27	(United States) Heart of Racing Team	Aston Martin Vantage AMR GT3 Evo	(Canada) Roman De Angelis	(United Kingdom) Ian James	(Canada) Zacharie Robichon
32	(United States) Korthoff/Preston Motorsports	Mercedes-AMG GT3 Evo	(Canada) Mikaël Grenier	(United States) Kenton Koch	(United States) Mike Skeen
34	(United States) Conquest Racing	Ferrari 296 GT3	(Spain) Albert Costa	(United States) Manny Franco	(Monaco) Cédric Sbirrazzuoli
43	(United States) Andretti Motorsports	Porsche 911 GT3 R (992)	(United States) Jarett Andretti	(Colombia) Gabby Chaves	(Canada) Scott Hargrove
44	(United States) Magnus Racing	Aston Martin Vantage AMR GT3 Evo	(United States) Andy Lally	(United States) John Potter	(United States) Spencer Pumpelly
45	(United States) Wayne Taylor Racing with Andretti	Lamborghini Huracán GT3 Evo 2	(United States) Graham Doyle	(Costa Rica) Danny Formal	(Canada) Kyle Marcelli
47	(Italy) Cetilar Racing	Ferrari 296 GT3	(Italy) Antonio Fuoco	(Italy) Roberto Lacorte	(Italy) Giorgio Sernagiotto
55	(Germany) Proton Competition	Ford Mustang GT3	(United States) Ryan Hardwick	(Italy) Giammarco Levorato	(United States) Corey Lewis
57	(United States) Winward Racing	Mercedes-AMG GT3 Evo	(Netherlands) Indy Dontje	(Switzerland) Philip Ellis	(United States) Russell Ward
66	(United States) Gradient Racing	Acura NSX GT3 Evo22	(Colombia) Tatiana Calderón	(United Kingdom) Stevan McAleer	(United States) Sheena Monk
70	(United Kingdom) Inception Racing	McLaren 720S GT3 Evo	(United States) Brendan Iribe	(United Kingdom) Ollie Millroy	(Denmark) Frederik Schandorff
78	(United States) Forte Racing	Lamborghini Huracán GT3 Evo 2	(Canada) Devlin DeFrancesco	(Canada) Misha Goikhberg	(Italy) Loris Spinelli
80	(United States) Lone Star Racing	Mercedes-AMG GT3 Evo	(Angola) Rui Andrade	(Australia) Scott Andrews	(Turkey) Salih Yoluç
83	(Italy) Iron Dames	Lamborghini Huracán GT3 Evo 2	(Belgium) Sarah Bovy	(Switzerland) Rahel Frey	(Denmark) Michelle Gatting
86	(United States) MDK Motorsports	Porsche 911 GT3 R (992)	(Austria) Klaus Bachler	(Denmark) Anders Fjordbach	(China) Kerong Li
96	(United States) Turner Motorsport	BMW M4 GT3	(United States) Robby Foley	(United States) Patrick Gallagher	(United States) Jake Walker
120	(United States) Wright Motorsports	Porsche 911 GT3 R (992)	(United States) Adam Adelson	(Belgium) Jan Heylen	(United States) Elliott Skeer

== Practice ==
There were two practice sessions scheduled preceding the start of the race on Sunday, one on Friday and one on Saturday. The first session lasted 90 minutes on Friday afternoon while the second session lasted 90 minutes on Saturday morning.

== Qualifying ==
Saturday's afternoon qualifying session was broken into three sessions, with one session for the GTP, LMP2, GTD Pro and GTD classes, which lasted 15 minutes each. The rules dictated that all teams nominated a driver to qualify their cars, with the Pro-Am LMP2 class requiring a Bronze rated driver to qualify the car. The competitors' fastest lap times determined the starting order. IMSA then arranged the grid to put GTPs ahead of the LMP2, GTD Pro, and GTD cars.

=== Qualifying results ===
Pole positions in each class are indicated in bold and with ‡.

Pos.	Class	No.	Entry	Driver	Time	Gap	Grid
1	**GTP**	**40**	**(United States) Wayne Taylor Racing with Andretti**	**(Switzerland) Louis Delétraz**	**1:32.209**	—	1‡
2	GTP	01	(United States) Cadillac Racing	(Netherlands) Renger van der Zande	1:32.247	+0.038	2
3	GTP	31	(United States) Whelen Cadillac Racing	(United Kingdom) Jack Aitken	1:32.479	+0.270	3
4	GTP	85	(United States) JDC–Miller MotorSports	(United Kingdom) Phil Hanson	1:32.525	+0.316	4
5	GTP	6	(Germany) Porsche Penske Motorsport	(France) Mathieu Jaminet	1:32.579	+0.370	5
6	GTP	7	(Germany) Porsche Penske Motorsport	(Brazil) Felipe Nasr	1:32.648	+0.439	6
7	GTP	10	(United States) Wayne Taylor Racing with Andretti	(United States) Ricky Taylor	1:32.835	+0.626	7
8	GTP	24	(United States) BMW M Team RLL	(Austria) Philipp Eng	1:32.851	+0.642	8
9	GTP	63	(Italy) Lamborghini – Iron Lynx	(Italy) Andrea Caldarelli	1:32.923	+0.714	9
10	GTP	5	(Germany) Proton Competition Mustang Sampling	(Italy) Gianmaria Bruni	1:32.923	+0.714	10
11	**LMP2**	**99**	**(United States) AO Racing**	**(United States) P. J. Hyett**	**1:35.925**	**+3.716**	12‡
12	LMP2	22	(United States) United Autosports USA	(United States) Dan Goldburg	1:36.607	+4.398	13
13	LMP2	11	(France) TDS Racing	(United States) Steven Thomas	1:36.609	+4.400	14
14	LMP2	52	(Poland) Inter Europol by PR1/Mathiasen Motorsports	(United States) Nick Boulle	1:36.981	+4.772	15
15	LMP2	2	(United States) United Autosports USA	(United States) Ben Keating	1:37.170	+4.961	16
16	LMP2	04	(United States) CrowdStrike Racing by APR	(United States) George Kurtz	1:37.601	+5.392	17
17	LMP2	74	(United States) Riley	(United States) Gar Robinson	1:37.757	+5.548	18
18	LMP2	20	(Denmark) MDK by High Class Racing	(Denmark) Dennis Andersen	1:38.094	+5.885	19
19	LMP2	88	(Italy) Richard Mille AF Corse	(Argentina) Luis Pérez Companc	1:38.153	+5.944	20
20	LMP2	18	(United States) Era Motorsport	(United States) Dwight Merriman	1:39.204	+6.995	21
21	LMP2	81	(United States) DragonSpeed	(United States) Eric Lux	1:39.221	+7.012	22
22	LMP2	8	(United States) Tower Motorsports	(Canada) John Farano	1:40.949	+8.740	23
23	LMP2	33	(United States) Sean Creech Motorsport	(United States) Lance Willsey	1:41.773	+9.564	24
24	**GTD Pro**	**62**	**(United States) Risi Competizione**	**(Brazil) Daniel Serra**	**1:44.203**	**+11.994**	25‡
25	GTD Pro	3	(United States) Corvette Racing by Pratt Miller Motorsports	(United Kingdom) Alexander Sims	1:44.317	+12.108	26
26	GTD Pro	23	(United States) Heart of Racing Team	(United Kingdom) Ross Gunn	1:44.387	+12.178	27
27	GTD Pro	14	(United States) Vasser Sullivan	(United Kingdom) Jack Hawksworth	1:44.511	+12.302	28
28	GTD Pro	4	(United States) Corvette Racing by Pratt Miller Motorsports	(Netherlands) Nicky Catsburg	1:44.561	+12.352	29
29	**GTD**	**12**	**(United States) Vasser Sullivan**	**(Canada) Parker Thompson**	**1:44.642**	**+12.433**	30‡
30	GTD Pro	1	(United States) Paul Miller Racing	(United States) Madison Snow	1:44.662	+12.453	31
31	GTD Pro	64	(Canada) Ford Multimatic Motorsports	(Germany) Mike Rockenfeller	1:44.734	+12.525	32
32	GTD Pro	77	(United States) AO Racing	(United Kingdom) Sebastian Priaulx	1:45.029	+12.820	33
33	GTD Pro	9	(Canada) Pfaff Motorsports	(Germany) Marvin Kirchhöfer	1:45.083	+12.874	34
34	GTD Pro	19	(Italy) Iron Lynx	(France) Franck Perera	1:45.242	+13.033	35
35	GTD	023	(United States) Triarsi Competizione	(United States) Onofrio Triarsi	1:45.432	+13.033	36
36	GTD	32	(United States) Korthoff/Preston Motorsports	(Canada) Mikaël Grenier	1:45.432	+13.223	37
37	GTD	57	(United States) Winward Racing	(United States) Russell Ward	1:45.541	+13.332	38
38	GTD Pro	65	(Canada) Ford Multimatic Motorsports	(Germany) Dirk Müller	1:45.638	+13.429	39
39	GTD	96	(United States) Turner Motorsport	(United States) Patrick Gallagher	1:45.716	+13.507	40
40	GTD	70	(United Kingdom) Inception Racing	(United States) Brendan Iribe	1:46.076	+13.867	41
41	GTD	78	(United States) Forte Racing	(Canada) Misha Goikhberg	1:46.133	+13.924	42
42	GTD	34	(United States) Conquest Racing	(United States) Manny Franco	1:46.301	+14.092	43
43	GTD	80	(United States) Lone Star Racing	(Turkey) Salih Yoluç	1:46.487	+14.278	44
44	GTD	83	(Italy) Iron Dames	(Switzerland) Rahel Frey	1:46.593	+14.384	56^{1}
45	GTD	27	(United States) Heart of Racing Team	(United Kingdom) Ian James	1:46.817	+14.608	45
46	GTD	55	(Germany) Proton Competition	(United States) Ryan Hardwick	1:46.833	+14.624	46
47	GTD	120	(United States) Wright Motorsports	(United States) Adam Adelson	1:47.119	+14.910	47
48	GTD	44	(United States) Magnus Racing	(United States) John Potter	1:47.132	+14.923	48
49	GTD	47	(Italy) Cetilar Racing	(Italy) Roberto Lacorte	1:47.796	+15.587	49
50	GTD	21	(Italy) AF Corse	(France) François Heriau	1:47.965	+15.756	50
51	GTD	66	(United States) Gradient Racing	(United States) Sheena Monk	1:48.004	+15.795	51
52	GTD	45	(United States) Wayne Taylor Racing with Andretti	(United States) Graham Doyle	1:48.790	+16.581	52
53	GTD	13	(Canada) AWA	(Canada) Orey Fidani	1:48.826	+16.617	53
54	GTD	43	(United States) Andretti Motorsports	(United States) Jarett Andretti	1:49.117	+16.908	54
55	GTD	86	(United States) MDK Motorsports	(China) Kerong Li	1:50.164	+17.955	55
56	GTP	25	(United States) BMW M Team RLL	No Time Established^{2}			11
Sources:

- ^{1} The No. 83 Iron Dames entry was moved to the back of the GTD class as per Article 40.5 of the Sporting regulations (Engine change).
- ^{2} The No. 25 BMW M Team RLL entry did not participate in qualifying after Connor De Phillippi crashed the car during the second practice session. By IMSA rules, the car started from the rear of the GTP class on the starting grid.

== Post-race ==
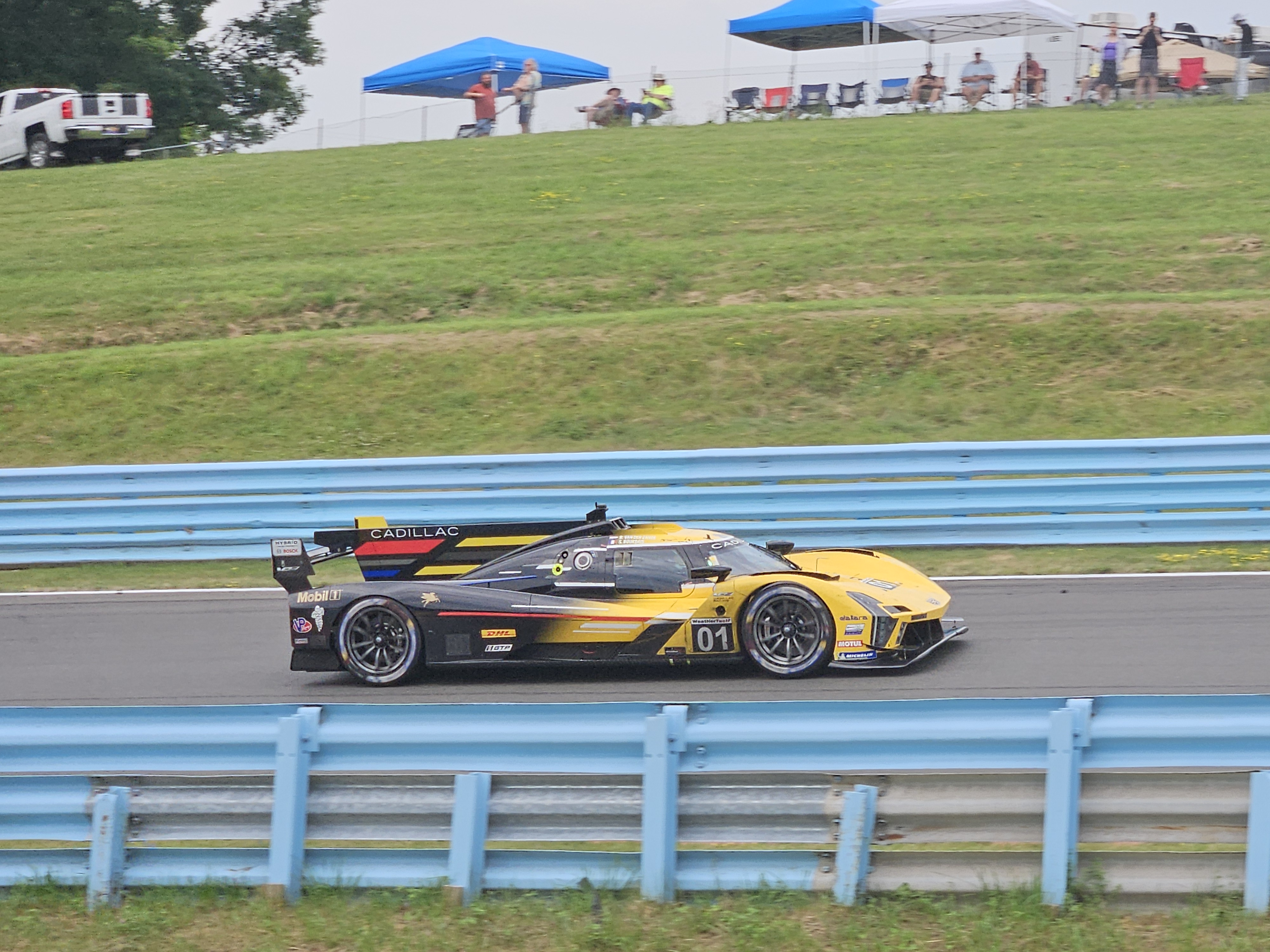
The No. 01 Cadillac Racing car took second in the GTP class

Cameron and Nasr's victory allowed them to extend their advantage to 95 points over Bourdais and van der Zande in the GTP Drivers' Championship. By finishing in second-place, Burdon, Fraga, and Robinson took the lead of the LMP2 Drivers' Championship with 958 points. The final results kept Heinrich and Priaulx atop the GTD Pro Drivers' Championship with 1632 points, 49 ahead of fourth-place finishers Barnicoat and Hawksworth, who in turn were 11 points in front of Gunn. Ellis and Ward's victory allowed them to extend their advantage to 305 points over fifth-place finishers Foley and Gallagher in the GTD Drivers' Championship. Porsche and Mercedes-AMG continued to top their respective Manufactures' Championships. Porsche Penske Motorsport, AO Racing, and Winward Racing kept their respective advantages in their of Teams' Championships while Riley became the leader of the LMP2 Teams' Championship with five rounds remaining.

=== Race results ===
Class winners are denoted in bold and with ‡.

Pos	Class	No	Team	Drivers	Chassis	Laps	Time/Retired
Pos	Class	No	Team	Drivers	Engine	Laps	Time/Retired
1	**GTP**	**7**	**(Germany) Porsche Penske Motorsport**	**(United States) Dane Cameron (Brazil) Felipe Nasr**	**Porsche 963**	**148**	**6:01:10.521‡**
1	**GTP**	**7**	**(Germany) Porsche Penske Motorsport**	**(United States) Dane Cameron (Brazil) Felipe Nasr**	**Porsche 9RD 4.6 L twin-turbo V8**	**148**	**6:01:10.521‡**
2	GTP	01	(United States) Cadillac Racing	(France) Sébastien Bourdais (Netherlands) Renger van der Zande	Cadillac V-Series.R	148	+0.749
2	GTP	01	(United States) Cadillac Racing	(France) Sébastien Bourdais (Netherlands) Renger van der Zande	Cadillac LMC55R 5.5 L V8	148	+0.749
3	GTP	6	(Germany) Porsche Penske Motorsport	(France) Mathieu Jaminet (United Kingdom) Nick Tandy	Porsche 963	148	+2.819
3	GTP	6	(Germany) Porsche Penske Motorsport	(France) Mathieu Jaminet (United Kingdom) Nick Tandy	Porsche 9RD 4.6 L twin-turbo V8	148	+2.819
4	GTP	40	(United States) Wayne Taylor Racing with Andretti	(Switzerland) Louis Delétraz (United States) Jordan Taylor	Acura ARX-06	148	+22.455
4	GTP	40	(United States) Wayne Taylor Racing with Andretti	(Switzerland) Louis Delétraz (United States) Jordan Taylor	Acura AR24e 2.4 L twin-turbo V6	148	+22.455
5	GTP	24	(United States) BMW M Team RLL	(Austria) Philipp Eng (Finland) Jesse Krohn	BMW M Hybrid V8	148	+22.924
5	GTP	24	(United States) BMW M Team RLL	(Austria) Philipp Eng (Finland) Jesse Krohn	BMW P66/3 4.0 L twin-turbo V8	148	+22.924
6	GTP	25	(United States) BMW M Team RLL	(United States) Connor De Phillippi (United Kingdom) Nick Yelloly	BMW M Hybrid V8	148	+23.820
6	GTP	25	(United States) BMW M Team RLL	(United States) Connor De Phillippi (United Kingdom) Nick Yelloly	BMW P66/3 4.0 L twin-turbo V8	148	+23.820
7	GTP	5	(Germany) Proton Competition Mustang Sampling	(Italy) Gianmaria Bruni (Netherlands) Bent Viscaal	Porsche 963	147	+1 Lap
7	GTP	5	(Germany) Proton Competition Mustang Sampling	(Italy) Gianmaria Bruni (Netherlands) Bent Viscaal	Porsche 9RD 4.6 L twin-turbo V8	147	+1 Lap
8	GTP	31	(United States) Whelen Cadillac Racing	(United Kingdom) Jack Aitken (United Kingdom) Tom Blomqvist (Brazil) Pipo Derani	Cadillac V-Series.R	147	+1 Lap
8	GTP	31	(United States) Whelen Cadillac Racing	(United Kingdom) Jack Aitken (United Kingdom) Tom Blomqvist (Brazil) Pipo Derani	Cadillac LMC55R 5.5 L V8	147	+1 Lap
9	**LMP2**	**88**	**(Italy) Richard Mille AF Corse**	**(Denmark) Nicklas Nielsen (Argentina) Luis Pérez Companc (France) Lilou Wadoux**	**Oreca 07**	**147**	**+1 Lap‡**
9	**LMP2**	**88**	**(Italy) Richard Mille AF Corse**	**(Denmark) Nicklas Nielsen (Argentina) Luis Pérez Companc (France) Lilou Wadoux**	**Gibson GK428 4.2 L V8**	**147**	**+1 Lap‡**
10	LMP2	74	(United States) Riley	(New Zealand) Josh Burdon (Brazil) Felipe Fraga (United States) Gar Robinson	Oreca 07	147	+1 Lap
10	LMP2	74	(United States) Riley	(New Zealand) Josh Burdon (Brazil) Felipe Fraga (United States) Gar Robinson	Gibson GK428 4.2 L V8	147	+1 Lap
11	LMP2	52	(Poland) Inter Europol by PR1/Mathiasen Motorsports	(United States) Nick Boulle (France) Tom Dillmann (Poland) Jakub Śmiechowski	Oreca 07	146	+2 Laps
11	LMP2	52	(Poland) Inter Europol by PR1/Mathiasen Motorsports	(United States) Nick Boulle (France) Tom Dillmann (Poland) Jakub Śmiechowski	Gibson GK428 4.2 L V8	146	+2 Laps
12	LMP2	20	(Denmark) MDK by High Class Racing	(Denmark) Dennis Andersen (United States) Scott Huffaker (United States) Seth Lucas	Oreca 07	146	+2 Laps
12	LMP2	20	(Denmark) MDK by High Class Racing	(Denmark) Dennis Andersen (United States) Scott Huffaker (United States) Seth Lucas	Gibson GK428 4.2 L V8	146	+2 Laps
13	LMP2	22	(United States) United Autosports USA	(United Kingdom) Paul di Resta (United States) Bijoy Garg (United States) Dan Goldburg	Oreca 07	146	+2 Laps
13	LMP2	22	(United States) United Autosports USA	(United Kingdom) Paul di Resta (United States) Bijoy Garg (United States) Dan Goldburg	Gibson GK428 4.2 L V8	146	+2 Laps
14	LMP2	8	(United States) Tower Motorsports	(United States) Michael Dinan (Republic of Ireland) Charlie Eastwood (Canada) John Farano	Oreca 07	146	+2 Laps
14	LMP2	8	(United States) Tower Motorsports	(United States) Michael Dinan (Republic of Ireland) Charlie Eastwood (Canada) John Farano	Gibson GK428 4.2 L V8	146	+2 Laps
15	LMP2	99	(United States) AO Racing	(Australia) Matthew Brabham (France) Paul-Loup Chatin (United States) P. J. Hyett	Oreca 07	146	+2 Laps
15	LMP2	99	(United States) AO Racing	(Australia) Matthew Brabham (France) Paul-Loup Chatin (United States) P. J. Hyett	Gibson GK428 4.2 L V8	146	+2 Laps
16	LMP2	2	(United States) United Autosports USA	(United Kingdom) Ben Hanley (United States) Ben Keating (Chile) Nico Pino	Oreca 07	146	+2 Laps
16	LMP2	2	(United States) United Autosports USA	(United Kingdom) Ben Hanley (United States) Ben Keating (Chile) Nico Pino	Gibson GK428 4.2 L V8	146	+2 Laps
17	GTP	85	(United States) JDC–Miller MotorSports	(United Kingdom) Phil Hanson (Netherlands) Tijmen van der Helm (United Kingdom) Richard Westbrook	Porsche 963	146	+2 Laps
17	GTP	85	(United States) JDC–Miller MotorSports	(United Kingdom) Phil Hanson (Netherlands) Tijmen van der Helm (United Kingdom) Richard Westbrook	Porsche 9RD 4.6 L twin-turbo V8	146	+2 Laps
18	**GTD Pro**	**23**	**(United States) Heart of Racing Team**	**(United Kingdom) Ross Gunn (Spain) Alex Riberas**	**Aston Martin Vantage AMR GT3 Evo**	**139**	**+9 Laps‡**
18	**GTD Pro**	**23**	**(United States) Heart of Racing Team**	**(United Kingdom) Ross Gunn (Spain) Alex Riberas**	**Aston Martin M177 4.0 L Turbo V8**	**139**	**+9 Laps‡**
19	GTD Pro	9	(Canada) Pfaff Motorsports	(United Kingdom) Oliver Jarvis (Germany) Marvin Kirchhöfer	McLaren 720S GT3 Evo	139	+9 Laps
19	GTD Pro	9	(Canada) Pfaff Motorsports	(United Kingdom) Oliver Jarvis (Germany) Marvin Kirchhöfer	McLaren M840T 4.0 L Turbo V8	139	+9 Laps
20	GTD Pro	3	(United States) Corvette Racing by Pratt Miller Motorsports	(Spain) Antonio García (United Kingdom) Alexander Sims	Chevrolet Corvette Z06 GT3.R	139	+9 Laps
20	GTD Pro	3	(United States) Corvette Racing by Pratt Miller Motorsports	(Spain) Antonio García (United Kingdom) Alexander Sims	Chevrolet LT6 5.5 L V8	139	+9 Laps
21	GTD Pro	14	(United States) Vasser Sullivan	(United Kingdom) Ben Barnicoat (United Kingdom) Jack Hawksworth	Lexus RC F GT3	139	+9 Laps
21	GTD Pro	14	(United States) Vasser Sullivan	(United Kingdom) Ben Barnicoat (United Kingdom) Jack Hawksworth	Toyota 2UR-GSE 5.0 L V8	139	+9 Laps
22	GTD Pro	64	(Canada) Ford Multimatic Motorsports	(Germany) Mike Rockenfeller (United Kingdom) Harry Tincknell	Ford Mustang GT3	139	+9 Laps
22	GTD Pro	64	(Canada) Ford Multimatic Motorsports	(Germany) Mike Rockenfeller (United Kingdom) Harry Tincknell	Ford Coyote 5.4 L V8	139	+9 Laps
23	GTD Pro	77	(United States) AO Racing	(Germany) Laurin Heinrich (United Kingdom) Sebastian Priaulx	Porsche 911 GT3 R (992)	139	+9 Laps
23	GTD Pro	77	(United States) AO Racing	(Germany) Laurin Heinrich (United Kingdom) Sebastian Priaulx	Porsche M97/80 4.2 L Flat-6	139	+9 Laps
24	**GTD**	**57**	**(United States) Winward Racing**	**(Netherlands) Indy Dontje (Switzerland) Philip Ellis (United States) Russell Ward**	**Mercedes-AMG GT3 Evo**	**139**	**+9 Laps**
24	**GTD**	**57**	**(United States) Winward Racing**	**(Netherlands) Indy Dontje (Switzerland) Philip Ellis (United States) Russell Ward**	**Mercedes-AMG M159 6.2 L V8**	**139**	**+9 Laps**
25	GTD	34	(United States) Conquest Racing	(Spain) Albert Costa (United States) Manny Franco (Monaco) Cédric Sbirrazzuoli	Ferrari 296 GT3	139	+9 Laps
25	GTD	34	(United States) Conquest Racing	(Spain) Albert Costa (United States) Manny Franco (Monaco) Cédric Sbirrazzuoli	Ferrari F163 3.0 L Turbo V6	139	+9 Laps
26	GTD	44	(United States) Magnus Racing	(United States) Andy Lally (United States) John Potter (United States) Spencer Pumpelly	Aston Martin Vantage AMR GT3 Evo	139	+9 Laps
26	GTD	44	(United States) Magnus Racing	(United States) Andy Lally (United States) John Potter (United States) Spencer Pumpelly	Aston Martin M177 4.0 L Turbo V8	139	+9 Laps
27	GTD	12	(United States) Vasser Sullivan	(United States) Frankie Montecalvo (United States) Aaron Telitz (Canada) Parker Thompson	Lexus RC F GT3	139	+9 Laps
27	GTD	12	(United States) Vasser Sullivan	(United States) Frankie Montecalvo (United States) Aaron Telitz (Canada) Parker Thompson	Toyota 2UR-GSE 5.0 L V8	139	+9 Laps
28	GTD	96	(United States) Turner Motorsport	(United States) Robby Foley (United States) Patrick Gallagher (United States) Jake Walker	BMW M4 GT3	139	+9 Laps
28	GTD	96	(United States) Turner Motorsport	(United States) Robby Foley (United States) Patrick Gallagher (United States) Jake Walker	BMW S58B30T0 3.0 L Turbo I6	139	+9 Laps
29	GTD	21	(Italy) AF Corse	(France) François Heriau (United Kingdom) Simon Mann (Spain) Miguel Molina	Ferrari 296 GT3	139	+9 Laps
29	GTD	21	(Italy) AF Corse	(France) François Heriau (United Kingdom) Simon Mann (Spain) Miguel Molina	Ferrari F163 3.0 L Turbo V6	139	+9 Laps
30	GTD	13	(Canada) AWA	(United Kingdom) Matt Bell (Canada) Orey Fidani (Germany) Lars Kern	Chevrolet Corvette Z06 GT3.R	139	+9 Laps
30	GTD	13	(Canada) AWA	(United Kingdom) Matt Bell (Canada) Orey Fidani (Germany) Lars Kern	Chevrolet LT6 5.5 L V8	139	+9 Laps
31	GTD	86	(United States) MDK Motorsports	(Austria) Klaus Bachler (Denmark) Anders Fjordbach (China) Kerong Li	Porsche 911 GT3 R (992)	139	+9 Laps
31	GTD	86	(United States) MDK Motorsports	(Austria) Klaus Bachler (Denmark) Anders Fjordbach (China) Kerong Li	Porsche M97/80 4.2 L Flat-6	139	+9 Laps
32	GTD	023	(United States) Triarsi Competizione	(Italy) Alessio Rovera (United States) Charlie Scardina (United States) Onofrio Triarsi	Ferrari 296 GT3	139	+9 Laps
32	GTD	023	(United States) Triarsi Competizione	(Italy) Alessio Rovera (United States) Charlie Scardina (United States) Onofrio Triarsi	Ferrari F163 3.0 L Turbo V6	139	+9 Laps
33	GTD	43	(United States) Andretti Motorsports	(United States) Jarett Andretti (Colombia) Gabby Chaves (Canada) Scott Hargrove	Porsche 911 GT3 R (992)	139	+9 Laps
33	GTD	43	(United States) Andretti Motorsports	(United States) Jarett Andretti (Colombia) Gabby Chaves (Canada) Scott Hargrove	Porsche M97/80 4.2 L Flat-6	139	+9 Laps
34	GTD Pro	4	(United States) Corvette Racing by Pratt Miller Motorsports	(Netherlands) Nicky Catsburg (United States) Tommy Milner	Chevrolet Corvette Z06 GT3.R	139	+9 Laps
34	GTD Pro	4	(United States) Corvette Racing by Pratt Miller Motorsports	(Netherlands) Nicky Catsburg (United States) Tommy Milner	Chevrolet LT6 5.5 L V8	139	+9 Laps
35	GTD	32	(United States) Korthoff/Preston Motorsports	(Canada) Mikaël Grenier (United States) Kenton Koch (United States) Mike Skeen	Mercedes-AMG GT3 Evo	139	+9 Laps
35	GTD	32	(United States) Korthoff/Preston Motorsports	(Canada) Mikaël Grenier (United States) Kenton Koch (United States) Mike Skeen	Mercedes-AMG M159 6.2 L V8	139	+9 Laps
36	GTD Pro	1	(United States) Paul Miller Racing	(United States) Bryan Sellers (United States) Madison Snow (United States) Neil Verhagen	BMW M4 GT3	139	+9 Laps
36	GTD Pro	1	(United States) Paul Miller Racing	(United States) Bryan Sellers (United States) Madison Snow (United States) Neil Verhagen	BMW S58B30T0 3.0 L Turbo I6	139	+9 Laps
37	GTD	45	(United States) Wayne Taylor Racing with Andretti	(United States) Graham Doyle (Costa Rica) Danny Formal (Canada) Kyle Marcelli	Lamborghini Huracán GT3 Evo 2	138	+10 Laps
37	GTD	45	(United States) Wayne Taylor Racing with Andretti	(United States) Graham Doyle (Costa Rica) Danny Formal (Canada) Kyle Marcelli	Lamborghini DGF 5.2 L V10	138	+10 Laps
38	GTD	66	(United States) Gradient Racing	(Colombia) Tatiana Calderón (United Kingdom) Stevan McAleer (United States) Sheena Monk	Acura NSX GT3 Evo22	137	+11 Laps
38	GTD	66	(United States) Gradient Racing	(Colombia) Tatiana Calderón (United Kingdom) Stevan McAleer (United States) Sheena Monk	Acura JNC1 3.5 L Turbo V6	137	+11 Laps
39 DNF	GTP	10	(United States) Wayne Taylor Racing with Andretti	(Portugal) Filipe Albuquerque (United States) Ricky Taylor	Acura ARX-06	134	Did Not Finish
39 DNF	GTP	10	(United States) Wayne Taylor Racing with Andretti	(Portugal) Filipe Albuquerque (United States) Ricky Taylor	Acura AR24e 2.4 L twin-turbo V6	134	Did Not Finish
40 DNF	GTD Pro	19	(Italy) Iron Lynx	(South Africa) Jordan Pepper (France) Franck Perera	Lamborghini Huracán GT3 Evo 2	131	Did Not Finish
40 DNF	GTD Pro	19	(Italy) Iron Lynx	(South Africa) Jordan Pepper (France) Franck Perera	Lamborghini DGF 5.2 L V10	131	Did Not Finish
41 DNF	LMP2	11	(France) TDS Racing	(Denmark) Mikkel Jensen (New Zealand) Hunter McElrea (United States) Steven Thomas	Oreca 07	125	Did Not Finish
41 DNF	LMP2	11	(France) TDS Racing	(Denmark) Mikkel Jensen (New Zealand) Hunter McElrea (United States) Steven Thomas	Gibson GK428 4.2 L V8	125	Did Not Finish
42	GTD Pro	65	(Canada) Ford Multimatic Motorsports	(United States) Joey Hand (Germany) Dirk Müller	Ford Mustang GT3	124	+24 Laps
42	GTD Pro	65	(Canada) Ford Multimatic Motorsports	(United States) Joey Hand (Germany) Dirk Müller	Ford Coyote 5.4 L V8	124	+24 Laps
43 DNF	LMP2	81	(United States) DragonSpeed	(Sweden) Rasmus Lindh (United States) Eric Lux (Argentina) Nicolás Varrone	Oreca 07	122	Did Not Finish
43 DNF	LMP2	81	(United States) DragonSpeed	(Sweden) Rasmus Lindh (United States) Eric Lux (Argentina) Nicolás Varrone	Gibson GK428 4.2 L V8	122	Did Not Finish
44 DNF	GTD Pro	62	(United States) Risi Competizione	(Italy) Davide Rigon (Brazil) Daniel Serra	Ferrari 296 GT3	122	Did Not Finish
44 DNF	GTD Pro	62	(United States) Risi Competizione	(Italy) Davide Rigon (Brazil) Daniel Serra	Ferrari F163 3.0 L Turbo V6	122	Did Not Finish
45 DNF	GTD	78	(United States) Forte Racing	(Canada) Devlin DeFrancesco (Canada) Misha Goikhberg (Italy) Loris Spinelli	Lamborghini Huracán GT3 Evo 2	139	Accident
45 DNF	GTD	78	(United States) Forte Racing	(Canada) Devlin DeFrancesco (Canada) Misha Goikhberg (Italy) Loris Spinelli	Lamborghini DGF 5.2 L V10	139	Accident
46 DNF	GTP	63	(Italy) Lamborghini – Iron Lynx	(Italy) Matteo Cairoli (Italy) Andrea Caldarelli	Lamborghini SC63	139	Did Not Finish
46 DNF	GTP	63	(Italy) Lamborghini – Iron Lynx	(Italy) Matteo Cairoli (Italy) Andrea Caldarelli	Lamborghini 3.8 L twin-turbo V8	139	Did Not Finish
47 DNF	GTD	83	(Italy) Iron Dames	(Belgium) Sarah Bovy (Switzerland) Rahel Frey (Denmark) Michelle Gatting	Lamborghini Huracán GT3 Evo 2	139	Accident
47 DNF	GTD	83	(Italy) Iron Dames	(Belgium) Sarah Bovy (Switzerland) Rahel Frey (Denmark) Michelle Gatting	Lamborghini DGF 5.2 L V10	139	Accident
48 DNF	GTD	27	(United States) Heart of Racing Team	(Canada) Roman De Angelis (United Kingdom) Ian James (Canada) Zacharie Robichon	Aston Martin Vantage AMR GT3 Evo	139	Accident
48 DNF	GTD	27	(United States) Heart of Racing Team	(Canada) Roman De Angelis (United Kingdom) Ian James (Canada) Zacharie Robichon	Aston Martin M177 4.0 L Turbo V8	139	Accident
49 DNF	GTD	55	(Germany) Proton Competition	(United States) Ryan Hardwick (Italy) Giammarco Levorato (United States) Corey Lewis	Ford Mustang GT3	139	Accident
49 DNF	GTD	55	(Germany) Proton Competition	(United States) Ryan Hardwick (Italy) Giammarco Levorato (United States) Corey Lewis	Ford Coyote 5.4 L V8	139	Accident
50 DNF	LMP2	33	(United States) Sean Creech Motorsport	(Portugal) João Barbosa (United Kingdom) Jonny Edgar (United States) Lance Willsey	Ligier JS P217	65	Accident
50 DNF	LMP2	33	(United States) Sean Creech Motorsport	(Portugal) João Barbosa (United Kingdom) Jonny Edgar (United States) Lance Willsey	Gibson GK428 4.2 L V8	65	Accident
51 DNF	GTD	47	(Italy) Cetilar Racing	(Italy) Antonio Fuoco (Italy) Roberto Lacorte (Italy) Giorgio Sernagiotto	Ferrari 296 GT3	15	Accident
51 DNF	GTD	47	(Italy) Cetilar Racing	(Italy) Antonio Fuoco (Italy) Roberto Lacorte (Italy) Giorgio Sernagiotto	Ferrari F163 3.0 L Turbo V6	15	Accident
52 (Note: The No. 120 Wright Motorsports entry was moved to the rear of the GTD classification after Jan Heylen failed to meet minimum drive time.)	GTD	120	(United States) Wright Motorsports	(United States) Adam Adelson (Belgium) Jan Heylen (United States) Elliott Skeer	Porsche 911 GT3 R (992)	139	+9 Laps
52	GTD	120	(United States) Wright Motorsports	(United States) Adam Adelson (Belgium) Jan Heylen (United States) Elliott Skeer	Porsche M97/80 4.2 L Flat-6	139	+9 Laps
53 (Note: The No. 80 Lone Star Racing entry was moved to the rear of the GTD classification after Scott Andrews failed to meet minimum drive time.)	GTD	80	(United States) Lone Star Racing	(Angola) Rui Andrade (Australia) Scott Andrews (Turkey) Salih Yoluç	Mercedes-AMG GT3 Evo	139	+9 Laps
53	GTD	80	(United States) Lone Star Racing	(Angola) Rui Andrade (Australia) Scott Andrews (Turkey) Salih Yoluç	Mercedes-AMG M159 6.2 L V8	139	+9 Laps
54 (Note: The No. 70 Inception Racing entry was moved to the rear of the GTD classification after Frederik Schandorff failed to meet minimum drive time.)	GTD	70	(United Kingdom) Inception Racing	(United States) Brendan Iribe (United Kingdom) Ollie Millroy (Denmark) Frederik Schandorff	McLaren 720S GT3 Evo	139	+9 Laps
54	GTD	70	(United Kingdom) Inception Racing	(United States) Brendan Iribe (United Kingdom) Ollie Millroy (Denmark) Frederik Schandorff	McLaren M840T 4.0 L Turbo V8	139	+9 Laps
55 DNF	LMP2	18	(United States) Era Motorsport	(United Kingdom) Ryan Dalziel (United States) Dwight Merriman (United States) Connor Zilisch	Oreca 07	1	Did Not Finish
55 DNF	LMP2	18	(United States) Era Motorsport	(United Kingdom) Ryan Dalziel (United States) Dwight Merriman (United States) Connor Zilisch	Gibson GK428 4.2 L V8	1	Did Not Finish
56 (Note: The No. 04 CrowdStrike Racing by APR entry was moved to the rear of the LMP2 classification after Colin Braun failed to meet minimum drive time.)	LMP2	04	(United States) CrowdStrike Racing by APR	(United States) Colin Braun (United States) George Kurtz (United Kingdom) Toby Sowery	Oreca 07	147	+1 lap
56	LMP2	04	(United States) CrowdStrike Racing by APR	(United States) Colin Braun (United States) George Kurtz (United Kingdom) Toby Sowery	Gibson GK428 4.2 L V8	147	+1 lap

== Standings after the race ==
GTP Drivers' Championship standings
Pos.	+/–	Driver	Points
1		(United States) Dane Cameron (Brazil) Felipe Nasr	2044
2		(France) Sébastien Bourdais (Netherlands) Renger van der Zande	1951
3		(France) Mathieu Jaminet (United Kingdom) Nick Tandy	1912
4	1	(Switzerland) Louis Delétraz (United States) Jordan Taylor	1845
5	1	(United Kingdom) Jack Aitken (Brazil) Pipo Derani	1838

LMP2 Drivers' Championship standings
Pos.	+/–	Driver	Points
1	1	(Australia) Josh Burdon (Brazil) Felipe Fraga (United States) Gar Robinson	958
2	1	(United Kingdom) Ryan Dalziel (United States) Dwight Merriman (United States) Connor Zilisch	952
3	2	(United States) Nick Boulle (France) Tom Dillmann (Poland) Jakub Śmiechowski	918
4	2	(United Kingdom) Paul di Resta (United States) Bijoy Garg (United States) Dan Goldburg	850
5	1	(United States) Colin Braun (United States) George Kurtz (United Kingdom) Toby Sowery	800

GTD Pro Drivers' Championship standings
Pos.	+/–	Driver	Points
1		(Germany) Laurin Heinrich (United Kingdom) Sebastian Priaulx	1632
2		(United Kingdom) Ben Barnicoat (United Kingdom) Jack Hawksworth	1583
3		(United Kingdom) Ross Gunn	1572
4		(United States) Bryan Sellers (United States) Madison Snow	1423
5	1	(United Kingdom) Oliver Jarvis (Germany) Marvin Kirchhöfer	1394

GTD Drivers' Championship standings
Pos.	+/–	Driver	Points
1		(Switzerland) Philip Ellis (United States) Russell Ward	1745
2		(United States) Robby Foley (United States) Patrick Gallagher	1440
3	1	(Canada) Parker Thompson	1353
4	3	(Spain) Albert Costa (United States) Manny Franco	1290
5		(Canada) Mikaël Grenier (United States) Mike Skeen	1263

- Note: Only the top five positions are included for all sets of standings.

GTP Teams' Championship standings
Pos.	+/–	Team	Points
1		#7 Porsche Penske Motorsport	2044
2		#01 Cadillac Racing	1951
3		#6 Porsche Penske Motorsport	1912
4	1	#40 Wayne Taylor Racing with Andretti	1845
5	1	#31 Whelen Cadillac Racing	1838

LMP2 Teams' Championship standings
Pos.	+/–	Team	Points
1	1	#74 Riley	958
2	1	#18 Era Motorsport	952
3	1	#52 Inter Europol by PR1/Mathiasen Motorsports	918
4	1	#22 United Autosports USA	850
5	2	#04 CrowdStrike Racing by APR	800

GTD Pro Teams' Championship standings
Pos.	+/–	Team	Points
1		#77 AO Racing	1632
2		#14 Vasser Sullivan	1583
3		#23 Heart of Racing Team	1572
4		#1 Paul Miller Racing	1423
5	2	#9 Pfaff Motorsports	1394

GTD Teams' Championship standings
Pos.	+/–	Team	Points
1		#57 Winward Racing	1745
2		#96 Turner Motorsport	1440
3	3	#34 Conquest Racing	1290
4		#32 Korthoff/Preston Motorsports	1263
5	2	#120 Wright Motorsports	1198

- Note: Only the top five positions are included for all sets of standings.

GTP Manufacturers' Championship standings
Pos.	+/–	Manufacturer	Points
1		(Germany) Porsche	2175
2		(United States) Cadillac	2134
3		(Japan) Acura	2061
4		(Germany) BMW	1880
5		(Italy) Lamborghini	572

GTD Pro Manufacturers' Championship standings
Pos.	+/–	Manufacturer	Points
1		(Germany) Porsche	1657
2		(Japan) Lexus	1607
3		(United Kingdom) Aston Martin	1586
4		(United States) Chevrolet	1474
5		(United Kingdom) McLaren	1458

GTD Manufacturers' Championship standings
Pos.	+/–	Manufacturer	Points
1		(Germany) Mercedes-AMG	1837
2	2	(Japan) Lexus	1493
3	1	(Germany) Porsche	1470
4	1	(Italy) Lamborghini	1454
5		(United Kingdom) Aston Martin	1383

- Note: Only the top five positions are included for all sets of standings.

IMSA SportsCar Championship
Previous race: Chevrolet Detroit Sports Car Classic	2024 season	Next race: Chevrolet Grand Prix
