= 2024 Motul Course de Monterey =

Fourth round of the 2024 IMSA SportsCar Championship season

The layout of WeatherTech Raceway Laguna Seca, where the race was held.

The 2024 Motul Course de Monterey (formally known as the 2024 Motul Course de Monterey powered by Hyundai N) was a sports car race held at WeatherTech Raceway Laguna Seca near Monterey, California, on May 12, 2024. It was the fourth round of the 2024 IMSA SportsCar Championship.

== Background ==
=== Preview ===
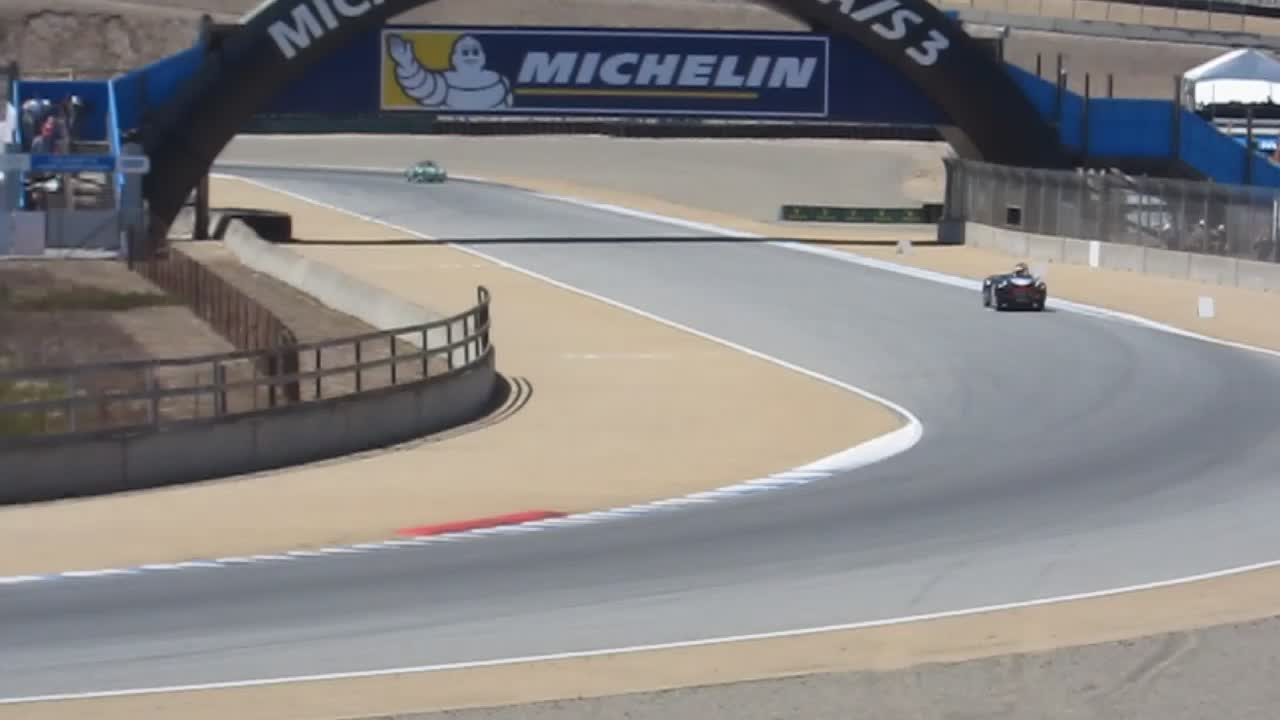
WeatherTech Raceway Laguna Seca, where the race was held.

International Motor Sports Association (IMSA) president John Doonan confirmed the race was part of the schedule of the 2024 IMSA SportsCar Championship (IMSA SCC) in August 2023. It will be the 11th consecutive year the race is a part of the IMSA SCC. The 2024 Motul Course de Monterey will be the fourth of eleventh scheduled sports car races of 2024 by IMSA. The race was held at the eleven-turn 2.238 mi (3.602 km) WeatherTech Raceway Laguna Seca on May 12, 2024.

=== Standings before the race ===
Before the race, Dane Cameron and Felipe Nasr led the GTP Drivers' Championship with 1032 points, 58 points ahead of Long Beach race winners Sébastien Bourdais and Renger van der Zande. Jack Aitken and Pipo Derani were a further 19 points behind, sitting in third place. GTD Pro did not participate in the Long Beach round, so the GTD Pro Drivers' Championship was led by James Calado, Davide Rigon, and Daniel Serra, with 722 points. They were 98 points ahead of Bryan Sellers, Madison Snow, and Neil Verhagen in second. The GTD Drivers' Championship was led by Philip Ellis and Russell Ward with 987 points, 185 points ahead of second-placed Robby Foley and Patrick Gallagher. Parker Thompson were third, 195 points behind Ellis and Ward. Cadillac, Lexus, and Mercedes-AMG were leading their respective Manufacturers' Championships, whilst Porsche Penske Motorsport, Risi Competizione, and Winward Racing each led their respective Teams' Championships.

== Entry list ==
No.	Entrant	Car	Driver 1	Driver 2
GTP (Grand Touring Prototype) (10 entries)
01	(United States) Cadillac Racing	Cadillac V-Series.R	(France) Sébastien Bourdais	(Netherlands) Renger van der Zande
5	(Germany) Proton Competition Mustang Sampling	Porsche 963	(Italy) Gianmaria Bruni	(Netherlands) Bent Viscaal
6	(Germany) Porsche Penske Motorsport	Porsche 963	(France) Mathieu Jaminet	(United Kingdom) Nick Tandy
7	(Germany) Porsche Penske Motorsport	Porsche 963	(United States) Dane Cameron	(Brazil) Felipe Nasr
10	(United States) Wayne Taylor Racing with Andretti	Acura ARX-06	(Portugal) Filipe Albuquerque	(United States) Ricky Taylor
24	(United States) BMW M Team RLL	BMW M Hybrid V8	(Austria) Philipp Eng	(Finland) Jesse Krohn
25	(United States) BMW M Team RLL	BMW M Hybrid V8	(United States) Connor De Phillippi	(United Kingdom) Nick Yelloly
31	(United States) Whelen Cadillac Racing	Cadillac V-Series.R	(United Kingdom) Jack Aitken	(Brazil) Pipo Derani
40	(United States) Wayne Taylor Racing with Andretti	Acura ARX-06	(Switzerland) Louis Delétraz	(United States) Jordan Taylor
85	(United States) JDC–Miller MotorSports	Porsche 963	(Netherlands) Tijmen van der Helm	(United Kingdom) Richard Westbrook
GTD Pro (GT Daytona Pro) (9 entries)
1	(United States) Paul Miller Racing	BMW M4 GT3	(United States) Bryan Sellers	(United States) Madison Snow
3	(United States) Corvette Racing by Pratt Miller Motorsports	Chevrolet Corvette Z06 GT3.R	(Spain) Antonio García	(United Kingdom) Alexander Sims
4	(United States) Corvette Racing by Pratt Miller Motorsports	Chevrolet Corvette Z06 GT3.R	(Netherlands) Nicky Catsburg	(United States) Tommy Milner
9	(Canada) Pfaff Motorsports	McLaren 720S GT3 Evo	(United Kingdom) Oliver Jarvis	(Germany) Marvin Kirchhöfer
14	(United States) Vasser Sullivan	Lexus RC F GT3	(United Kingdom) Ben Barnicoat	(United Kingdom) Jack Hawksworth
23	(United States) Heart of Racing Team	Aston Martin Vantage AMR GT3 Evo	(Germany) Mario Farnbacher	(United Kingdom) Ross Gunn
64	(Canada) Ford Multimatic Motorsports	Ford Mustang GT3	(Germany) Mike Rockenfeller	(United Kingdom) Harry Tincknell
65	(Canada) Ford Multimatic Motorsports	Ford Mustang GT3	(United States) Joey Hand	(Germany) Dirk Müller
77	(United States) AO Racing	Porsche 911 GT3 R (992)	(Germany) Laurin Heinrich	(United Kingdom) Sebastian Priaulx
GTD (GT Daytona) (15 entries)
12	(United States) Vasser Sullivan	Lexus RC F GT3	(United States) Frankie Montecalvo	(Canada) Parker Thompson
13	(Canada) AWA	Chevrolet Corvette Z06 GT3.R	(United Kingdom) Matt Bell	(Canada) Orey Fidani
27	(United States) Heart of Racing Team	Aston Martin Vantage AMR GT3 Evo	(Canada) Roman De Angelis	(United States) Spencer Pumpelly
32	(United States) Korthoff/Preston Motorsports	Mercedes-AMG GT3 Evo	(Canada) Mikaël Grenier	(United States) Mike Skeen
34	(United States) Conquest Racing	Ferrari 296 GT3	(Spain) Albert Costa	(United States) Manny Franco
43	(United States) Andretti Motorsports	Porsche 911 GT3 R (992)	(United States) Jarett Andretti	(Colombia) Gabby Chaves
45	(United States) Wayne Taylor Racing with Andretti	Lamborghini Huracán GT3 Evo 2	(Costa Rica) Danny Formal	(Canada) Kyle Marcelli
55	(Germany) Proton Competition	Ford Mustang GT3	(Italy) Giammarco Levorato	(United States) Corey Lewis
57	(United States) Winward Racing	Mercedes-AMG GT3 Evo	(Switzerland) Philip Ellis	(United States) Russell Ward
66	(United States) Gradient Racing	Acura NSX GT3 Evo22	(United Kingdom) Stevan McAleer	(United States) Sheena Monk
70	(United Kingdom) Inception Racing	McLaren 720S GT3 Evo	(United States) Brendan Iribe	(Denmark) Frederik Schandorff
78	(United States) Forte Racing	Lamborghini Huracán GT3 Evo 2	(Canada) Misha Goikhberg	(Italy) Loris Spinelli
86	(United States) MDK Motorsports	Porsche 911 GT3 R (992)	(Denmark) Anders Fjordbach	(China) Kerong Li
120	(United States) Wright Motorsports	Porsche 911 GT3 R (992)	(United States) Adam Adelson	(United States) Elliott Skeer
557	(United States) Turner Motorsport	BMW M4 GT3	(United States) Robby Foley	(United States) Patrick Gallagher

== Practice ==
There were two practice sessions preceding the start of the race on Sunday, one on Friday afternoon and one on Saturday morning. The first session lasted 90 minutes on Friday afternoon while the second session on Saturday morning lasted 90 minutes.

== Qualifying ==
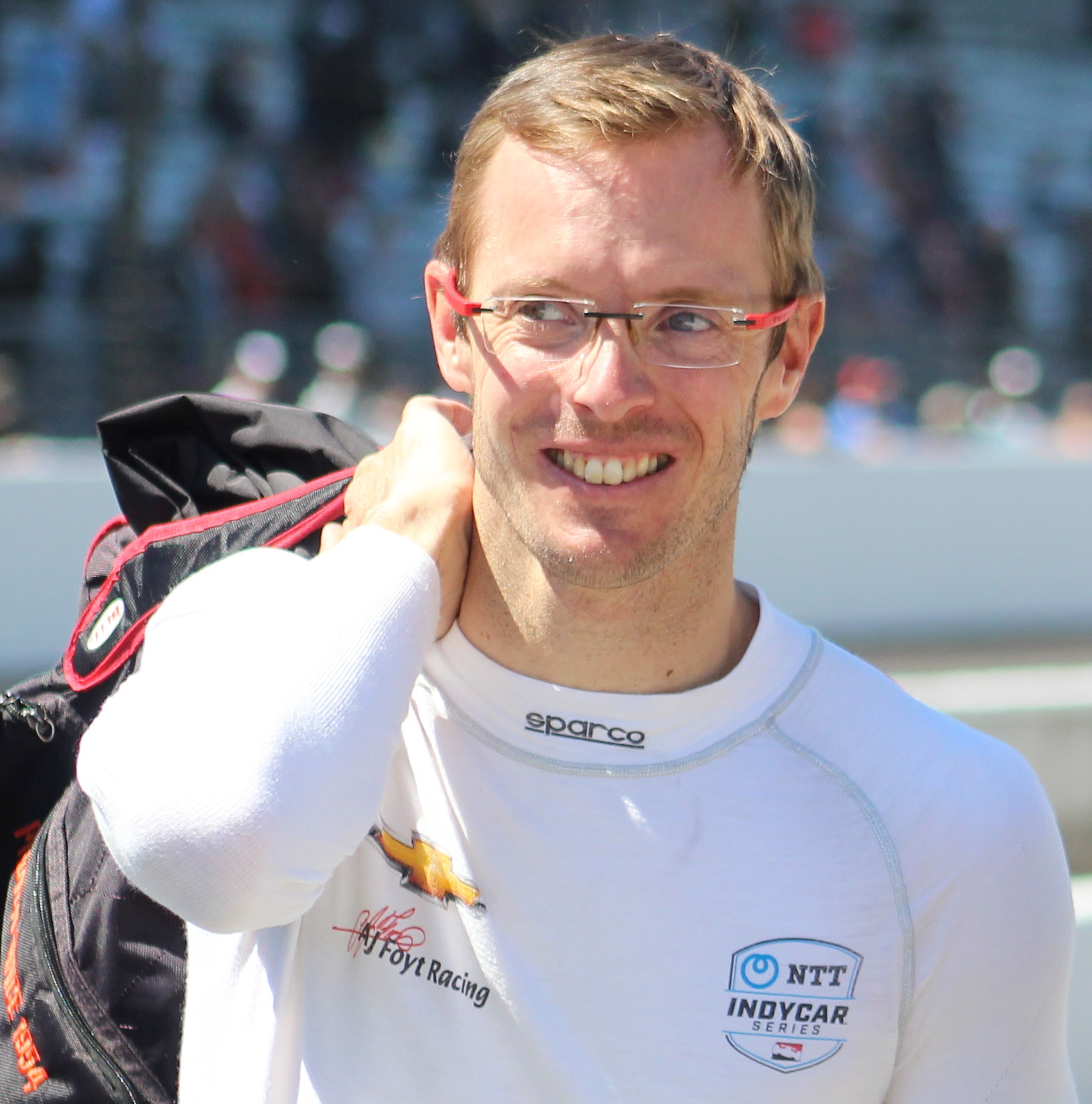
Sébastien Bourdais (pictured in 2021) took the overall pole position for Cadillac Racing.

Saturday's qualification session was divided into two groups with one session for the GTP, GTD Pro and the GTD classes, which lasted 15 minutes each. Cars in GTD Pro and GTD were sent out first. After a ten-minute interval, GTP vehicles drove onto the track. Regulations stipulated teams to nominate one qualifying driver, with the fastest laps determining each classes starting order. IMSA arranged the grid to put GTP vehicles ahead of the GTD Pro and GTD cars.

=== Qualifying results ===
Pole positions in each class are indicated in bold and with ‡.

Pos.	Class	No.	Entry	Driver	Time	Gap	Grid
1	**GTP**	**01**	**(United States) Cadillac Racing**	**(France) Sébastien Bourdais**	**1:12.445**	—	1‡
2	GTP	31	(United States) Whelen Cadillac Racing	(Brazil) Pipo Derani	1:12.557	+0.112	2
3	GTP	24	(United States) BMW M Team RLL	(Austria) Philipp Eng	1:12.649	+0.204	3
4	GTP	6	(Germany) Porsche Penske Motorsport	(France) Mathieu Jaminet	1:12.664	+0.219	4
5	GTP	25	(United States) BMW M Team RLL	(United States) Connor De Phillippi	1:12.704	+0.259	5
6	GTP	7	(Germany) Porsche Penske Motorsport	(United States) Dane Cameron	1:12.771	+0.326	6
7	GTP	10	(United States) Wayne Taylor Racing with Andretti	(United States) Ricky Taylor	1:12.905	+0.460	7
8	GTP	40	(United States) Wayne Taylor Racing with Andretti	(Switzerland) Louis Delétraz	1:13.084	+0.639	8
9	GTP	85	(United States) JDC–Miller MotorSports	(Netherlands) Tijmen van der Helm	1:13.184	+0.739	9
10	GTP	5	(Germany) Proton Competition Mustang Sampling	(Netherlands) Bent Viscaal	1:13.314	+0.869	10
11	**GTD Pro**	**4**	**(United States) Corvette Racing by Pratt Miller Motorsports**	**(Netherlands) Nicky Catsburg**	**1:19.727**	**+7.282**	11‡
12	GTD Pro	3	(United States) Corvette Racing by Pratt Miller Motorsports	(Spain) Antonio García	1:20.038	+7.593	12
13	GTD Pro	9	(Canada) Pfaff Motorsports	(Germany) Marvin Kirchhöfer	1:20.244	+7.799	13
14	GTD Pro	14	(United States) Vasser Sullivan	(United Kingdom) Jack Hawksworth	1:20.431	+7.986	14
15	GTD Pro	77	(United States) AO Racing	(United Kingdom) Sebastian Priaulx	1:20.473	+8.028	15
16	GTD Pro	23	(United States) Heart of Racing Team	(Germany) Mario Farnbacher	1:20.667	+8.222	16
17	**GTD**	**45**	**(United States) Wayne Taylor Racing with Andretti**	**(Costa Rica) Danny Formal**	**1:20.866**	**+8.421**	17‡
18	GTD	557	(United States) Turner Motorsport	(United States) Patrick Gallagher	1:20.995	+8.550	18
19	GTD Pro	1	(United States) Paul Miller Racing	(United States) Madison Snow	1:21.003	+8.559	19
20	GTD	57	(United States) Winward Racing	(United States) Russell Ward	1:21.051	+8.574	20
21	GTD	27	(United States) Heart of Racing Team	(United States) Spencer Pumpelly	1:21.051	+8.606	21
22	GTD	12	(United States) Vasser Sullivan	(United States) Frankie Montecalvo	1:21.074	+8.629	22
23	GTD	32	(United States) Korthoff/Preston Motorsports	(United States) Mike Skeen	1:21.088	+8.643	23
24	GTD Pro	64	(Canada) Ford Multimatic Motorsports	(Germany) Mike Rockenfeller	1:21.136	+8.691	24
25	GTD	78	(United States) Forte Racing	(Canada) Misha Goikhberg	1:21.335	+8.890	25
26	GTD	70	(United Kingdom) Inception Racing	(United States) Brendan Iribe	1:21.353	+8.908	26
27	GTD	34	(United States) Conquest Racing	(United States) Manny Franco	1:21.823	+9.378	27
28	GTD Pro	65	(Canada) Ford Multimatic Motorsports	(Germany) Dirk Müller	1:21.921	+9.476	28
29	GTD	55	(Germany) Proton Competition	(United States) Corey Lewis	1:22.051	+9.606	29
30	GTD	43	(United States) Andretti Motorsports	(United States) Jarett Andretti	1:22.346	+9.901	30
31	GTD	120	(United States) Wright Motorsports	(United States) Adam Adelson	1:22.458	+10.013	31
32	GTD	66	(United States) Gradient Racing	(United States) Sheena Monk	1:22.563	+10.118	32
33	GTD	13	(Canada) AWA	(Canada) Orey Fidani	1:23.294	+10.849	33
34	GTD	86	(United States) MDK Motorsports	(China) Kerong Li	1:23.437	+10.992	34

== Post-race ==
The final results kept Cameron and Nasr atop the GTP Drivers' Championship with 1357 points, 50 ahead of second-place finishers Aitken and Derani, who in turn, were a further 38 points in front of Bourdais and van der Zande. With 981 points, Heinrich and Priaulx's victory allowed them to take the lead of the GTD Pro Drivers' Championship. Fifth-place finishers García and Sims advanced from eighth to fifth while the absent Serra, Rigon, and Calado dropped to tenth. Ellis and Ward's victory allowed them to extend their advantage to 213 points over second-place finishers Foley and Gallagher in the GTD Drivers' Championship. Cadillac and Mercedes-AMG continued to top their respective Manufactures' Championships while Porsche took the lead of the GTD Pro Manufactures' Championship. Porsche Penske Motorsport and Winward Racing kept their respective advantages in their of Teams' Championships while AO Racing became the leader of the GTD Pro Teams' Championship with seven rounds remaining.

=== Race results ===
Class winners are denoted in bold and with ‡.

Pos	Class	No	Team	Drivers	Chassis	Laps	Time/Retired
Pos	Class	No	Team	Drivers	Engine	Laps	Time/Retired
1	**GTP**	**6**	**(Germany) Porsche Penske Motorsport**	**(France) Mathieu Jaminet (United Kingdom) Nick Tandy**	**Porsche 963**	**119**	**2:40:09.438‡**
1	**GTP**	**6**	**(Germany) Porsche Penske Motorsport**	**(France) Mathieu Jaminet (United Kingdom) Nick Tandy**	**Porsche 9RD 4.6 L twin-turbo V8**	**119**	**2:40:09.438‡**
2	GTP	31	(United States) Whelen Cadillac Racing	(United Kingdom) Jack Aitken (Brazil) Pipo Derani	Cadillac V-Series.R	119	+5.764
2	GTP	31	(United States) Whelen Cadillac Racing	(United Kingdom) Jack Aitken (Brazil) Pipo Derani	Cadillac LMC55R 5.5 L V8	119	+5.764
3	GTP	7	(Germany) Porsche Penske Motorsport	(United States) Dane Cameron (Brazil) Felipe Nasr	Porsche 963	119	+34.673
3	GTP	7	(Germany) Porsche Penske Motorsport	(United States) Dane Cameron (Brazil) Felipe Nasr	Porsche 9RD 4.6 L twin-turbo V8	119	+34.673
4	GTP	40	(United States) Wayne Taylor Racing with Andretti	(Switzerland) Louis Delétraz (United States) Jordan Taylor	Acura ARX-06	119	+43.445
4	GTP	40	(United States) Wayne Taylor Racing with Andretti	(Switzerland) Louis Delétraz (United States) Jordan Taylor	Acura AR24e 2.4 L twin-turbo V6	119	+43.445
5	GTP	01	(United States) Cadillac Racing	(France) Sébastien Bourdais (Netherlands) Renger van der Zande	Cadillac V-Series.R	119	+45.608
5	GTP	01	(United States) Cadillac Racing	(France) Sébastien Bourdais (Netherlands) Renger van der Zande	Cadillac LMC55R 5.5 L V8	119	+45.608
6	GTP	10	(United States) Wayne Taylor Racing with Andretti	(Portugal) Filipe Albuquerque (United States) Ricky Taylor	Acura ARX-06	119	+46.150
6	GTP	10	(United States) Wayne Taylor Racing with Andretti	(Portugal) Filipe Albuquerque (United States) Ricky Taylor	Acura AR24e 2.4 L twin-turbo V6	119	+46.150
7	GTP	25	(United States) BMW M Team RLL	(United States) Connor De Phillippi (United Kingdom) Nick Yelloly	BMW M Hybrid V8	119	+47.615
7	GTP	25	(United States) BMW M Team RLL	(United States) Connor De Phillippi (United Kingdom) Nick Yelloly	BMW P66/3 4.0 L twin-turbo V8	119	+47.615
8	GTP	85	(United States) JDC-Miller MotorSports	(Netherlands) Tijmen van der Helm (United Kingdom) Richard Westbrook	Porsche 963	119	+1:17.343
8	GTP	85	(United States) JDC-Miller MotorSports	(Netherlands) Tijmen van der Helm (United Kingdom) Richard Westbrook	Porsche 9RD 4.6 L twin-turbo V8	119	+1:17.343
9	GTP	24	(United States) BMW M Team RLL	(Austria) Philipp Eng (Finland) Jesse Krohn	BMW M Hybrid V8	118	+1 Lap
9	GTP	24	(United States) BMW M Team RLL	(Austria) Philipp Eng (Finland) Jesse Krohn	BMW P66/3 4.0 L twin-turbo V8	118	+1 Lap
10	GTP	5	(Germany) Proton Competition Mustang Sampling	(Italy) Gianmaria Bruni (Netherlands) Bent Viscaal	Porsche 963	118	+1 Lap
10	GTP	5	(Germany) Proton Competition Mustang Sampling	(Italy) Gianmaria Bruni (Netherlands) Bent Viscaal	Porsche 9RD 4.6 L twin-turbo V8	118	+1 Lap
11	**GTD Pro**	**77**	**(United States) AO Racing**	**(Germany) Laurin Heinrich (United Kingdom) Sebastian Priaulx**	**Porsche 911 GT3 R (992)**	**111**	**+8 Laps‡**
11	**GTD Pro**	**77**	**(United States) AO Racing**	**(Germany) Laurin Heinrich (United Kingdom) Sebastian Priaulx**	**Porsche 4.2 L Flat-6**	**111**	**+8 Laps‡**
12	GTD Pro	9	(Canada) Pfaff Motorsports	(United Kingdom) Oliver Jarvis (Germany) Marvin Kirchhöfer	McLaren 720S GT3 Evo	111	+8 Laps
12	GTD Pro	9	(Canada) Pfaff Motorsports	(United Kingdom) Oliver Jarvis (Germany) Marvin Kirchhöfer	McLaren M840T 4.0 L Turbo V8	111	+8 Laps
13	GTD Pro	4	(United States) Corvette Racing by Pratt Miller Motorsports	(Netherlands) Nicky Catsburg (United States) Tommy Milner	Chevrolet Corvette Z06 GT3.R	111	+8 Laps
13	GTD Pro	4	(United States) Corvette Racing by Pratt Miller Motorsports	(Netherlands) Nicky Catsburg (United States) Tommy Milner	Chevrolet LT6 5.5 L V8	111	+8 Laps
14	GTD Pro	14	(United States) Vasser Sullivan	(United Kingdom) Ben Barnicoat (United Kingdom) Jack Hawksworth	Lexus RC F GT3	111	+8 Laps
14	GTD Pro	14	(United States) Vasser Sullivan	(United Kingdom) Ben Barnicoat (United Kingdom) Jack Hawksworth	Toyota 2UR-GSE 5.0 L V8	111	+8 Laps
15	**GTD**	**57**	**(United States) Winward Racing**	**(United Kingdom) Philip Ellis (United States) Russell Ward**	**Mercedes-AMG GT3 Evo**	**111**	**+8 Laps‡**
15	**GTD**	**57**	**(United States) Winward Racing**	**(United Kingdom) Philip Ellis (United States) Russell Ward**	**Mercedes-AMG M159 6.2 L V8**	**111**	**+8 Laps‡**
16	GTD Pro	3	(United States) Corvette Racing by Pratt Miller Motorsports	(Spain) Antonio García (United Kingdom) Alexander Sims	Chevrolet Corvette Z06 GT3.R	111	+8 Laps
16	GTD Pro	3	(United States) Corvette Racing by Pratt Miller Motorsports	(Spain) Antonio García (United Kingdom) Alexander Sims	Chevrolet LT6 5.5 L V8	111	+8 Laps
17	GTD Pro	23	(United States) Heart of Racing Team	(Germany) Mario Farnbacher (United Kingdom) Ross Gunn	Aston Martin Vantage AMR GT3 Evo	111	+8 Laps
17	GTD Pro	23	(United States) Heart of Racing Team	(Germany) Mario Farnbacher (United Kingdom) Ross Gunn	Aston Martin M177 4.0 L Turbo V8	111	+8 Laps
18	GTD	557	(United States) Turner Motorsport	(United States) Robby Foley (United States) Patrick Gallagher	BMW M4 GT3	111	+8 Laps
18	GTD	557	(United States) Turner Motorsport	(United States) Robby Foley (United States) Patrick Gallagher	BMW S58B30T0 3.0 L Turbo I6	111	+8 Laps
19	GTD	120	(United States) Wright Motorsports	(United States) Adam Adelson (United States) Elliott Skeer	Porsche 911 GT3 R (992)	111	+8 Laps
19	GTD	120	(United States) Wright Motorsports	(United States) Adam Adelson (United States) Elliott Skeer	Porsche 4.2 L Flat-6	111	+8 Laps
20	GTD	32	(United States) Korthoff/Preston Motorsports	(Canada) Mikaël Grenier (United States) Mike Skeen	Mercedes-AMG GT3 Evo	110	+9 Laps
20	GTD	32	(United States) Korthoff/Preston Motorsports	(Canada) Mikaël Grenier (United States) Mike Skeen	Mercedes-AMG M159 6.2 L V8	110	+9 Laps
21	GTD	45	(United States) Wayne Taylor Racing with Andretti	(Costa Rica) Danny Formal (Canada) Kyle Marcelli	Lamborghini Huracán GT3 Evo 2	110	+9 Laps
21	GTD	45	(United States) Wayne Taylor Racing with Andretti	(Costa Rica) Danny Formal (Canada) Kyle Marcelli	Lamborghini DGF 5.2 L V10	110	+9 Laps
22	GTD Pro	1	(United States) Paul Miller Racing	(United States) Bryan Sellers (United States) Madison Snow	BMW M4 GT3	110	+9 Laps
22	GTD Pro	1	(United States) Paul Miller Racing	(United States) Bryan Sellers (United States) Madison Snow	BMW S58B30T0 3.0 L Turbo I6	110	+9 Laps
23	GTD Pro	65	(Canada) Ford Multimatic Motorsports	(United States) Joey Hand (Germany) Dirk Müller	Ford Mustang GT3	110	+9 Laps
23	GTD Pro	65	(Canada) Ford Multimatic Motorsports	(United States) Joey Hand (Germany) Dirk Müller	Ford Coyote 5.4 L V8	110	+9 Laps
24	GTD Pro	64	(Canada) Ford Multimatic Motorsports	(Germany) Mike Rockenfeller (United Kingdom) Harry Tincknell	Ford Mustang GT3	110	+9 Laps
24	GTD Pro	64	(Canada) Ford Multimatic Motorsports	(Germany) Mike Rockenfeller (United Kingdom) Harry Tincknell	Ford Coyote 5.4 L V8	110	+9 Laps
25	GTD	27	(United States) Heart of Racing Team	(Canada) Roman De Angelis (United States) Spencer Pumpelly	Aston Martin Vantage AMR GT3 Evo	110	+9 Laps
25	GTD	27	(United States) Heart of Racing Team	(Canada) Roman De Angelis (United States) Spencer Pumpelly	Aston Martin M177 4.0 L Turbo V8	110	+9 Laps
26	GTD	55	(Germany) Proton Competition	(Italy) Giammarco Levorato (United States) Corey Lewis	Ford Mustang GT3	110	+9 Laps
26	GTD	55	(Germany) Proton Competition	(Italy) Giammarco Levorato (United States) Corey Lewis	Ford Coyote 5.4 L V8	110	+9 Laps
27	GTD	78	(United States) Forte Racing	(Canada) Misha Goikhberg (Italy) Loris Spinelli	Lamborghini Huracán GT3 Evo 2	110	+9 Laps
27	GTD	78	(United States) Forte Racing	(Canada) Misha Goikhberg (Italy) Loris Spinelli	Lamborghini DGF 5.2 L V10	110	+9 Laps
28	GTD	12	(United States) Vasser Sullivan	(United States) Frankie Montecalvo (Canada) Parker Thompson	Lexus RC F GT3	109	+10 Laps
28	GTD	12	(United States) Vasser Sullivan	(United States) Frankie Montecalvo (Canada) Parker Thompson	Toyota 2UR-GSE 5.0 L V8	109	+10 Laps
29	GTD	43	(United States) Andretti Motorsports	(United States) Jarett Andretti (Colombia) Gabby Chaves	Porsche 911 GT3 R (992)	109	+10 Laps
29	GTD	43	(United States) Andretti Motorsports	(United States) Jarett Andretti (Colombia) Gabby Chaves	Porsche 4.2 L Flat-6	109	+10 Laps
30	GTD	13	(Canada) AWA	(United Kingdom) Matt Bell (Canada) Orey Fidani	Chevrolet Corvette Z06 GT3.R	109	+10 Laps
30	GTD	13	(Canada) AWA	(United Kingdom) Matt Bell (Canada) Orey Fidani	Chevrolet LT6 5.5 L V8	109	+10 Laps
31	GTD	66	(United States) Gradient Racing	(United Kingdom) Stevan McAleer (United States) Sheena Monk	Acura NSX GT3 Evo22	109	+10 Laps
31	GTD	66	(United States) Gradient Racing	(United Kingdom) Stevan McAleer (United States) Sheena Monk	Acura JNC1 3.5 L Turbo V6	109	+10 Laps
32	GTD	86	(United States) MDK Motorsports	(Denmark) Anders Fjordbach (China) Kerong Li	Porsche 911 GT3 R (992)	109	+10 Laps
32	GTD	86	(United States) MDK Motorsports	(Denmark) Anders Fjordbach (China) Kerong Li	Porsche 4.2 L Flat-6	109	+10 Laps
33	GTD	70	(United Kingdom) Inception Racing	(United States) Brendan Iribe (Denmark) Frederik Schandorff	McLaren 720S GT3 Evo	109	+10 Laps
33	GTD	70	(United Kingdom) Inception Racing	(United States) Brendan Iribe (Denmark) Frederik Schandorff	McLaren M840T 4.0 L Turbo V8	109	+10 Laps
34 DNF	GTD	34	(United States) Conquest Racing	(Spain) Albert Costa (United States) Manny Franco	Ferrari 296 GT3	79	Did Not Finish
34 DNF	GTD	34	(United States) Conquest Racing	(Spain) Albert Costa (United States) Manny Franco	Ferrari F163 3.0 L Turbo V6	79	Did Not Finish

== Standings after the race ==
GTP Drivers' Championship standings
Pos.	+/–	Driver	Points
1		(United States) Dane Cameron (Brazil) Felipe Nasr	1357
2	1	(United Kingdom) Jack Aitken (Brazil) Pipo Derani	1307
3	1	(France) Sébastien Bourdais (Netherlands) Renger van der Zande	1269
4		(Switzerland) Louis Delétraz (United States) Jordan Taylor	1244
5		(France) Mathieu Jaminet (United Kingdom) Nick Tandy	1231

LMP2 Drivers' Championship standings
Pos.	+/–	Driver	Points
1		(United Kingdom) Ryan Dalziel (United States) Dwight Merriman (United States) Connor Zilisch	741
2		(Australia) Josh Burdon (Brazil) Felipe Fraga (United States) Gar Robinson	614
3		(Denmark) Malthe Jakobsen	612
4		(United States) Colin Braun (United States) George Kurtz (United Kingdom) Toby Sowery	595
5		(United States) Nick Boulle (France) Tom Dillmann (Poland) Jakub Śmiechowski	590

GTD Pro Drivers' Championship standings
Pos.	+/–	Driver	Points
1	3	(Germany) Laurin Heinrich (United Kingdom) Sebastian Priaulx	981
2	1	(United Kingdom) Ben Barnicoat (United Kingdom) Jack Hawksworth	925
3	1	(United States) Bryan Sellers (United States) Madison Snow	888
4	2	(Germany) Mario Farnbacher (United Kingdom) Ross Gunn	867
5	3	(Spain) Antonio García (United Kingdom) Alexander Sims	812

GTD Drivers' Championship standings
Pos.	+/–	Driver	Points
1		(Switzerland) Philip Ellis (United States) Russell Ward	1367
2		(United States) Robby Foley (United States) Patrick Gallagher	1154
3	2	(United States) Adam Adelson (United States) Elliott Skeer	1059
4	1	(Canada) Parker Thompson	1038
5	1	(Canada) Mikaël Grenier (United States) Mike Skeen	1033

- Note: Only the top five positions are included for all sets of standings.

GTP Teams' Championship standings
Pos.	+/–	Team	Points
1		#7 Porsche Penske Motorsport	1357
2	1	#31 Whelen Cadillac Racing	1307
3	1	#01 Cadillac Racing	1269
4		#40 Wayne Taylor Racing with Andretti	1244
5		#6 Porsche Penske Motorsport	1231

LMP2 Teams' Championship standings
Pos.	+/–	Team	Points
1		#18 Era Motorsport	741
2		#74 Riley	614
3		#04 CrowdStrike Racing by APR	595
4		#52 Inter Europol by PR1/Mathiasen Motorsports	590
5		#22 United Autosports USA	558

GTD Pro Teams' Championship standings
Pos.	+/–	Team	Points
1	3	#77 AO Racing	981
2	1	#14 Vasser Sullivan	925
3	1	#1 Paul Miller Racing	888
4	2	#23 Heart of Racing Team	867
5	3	#3 Corvette Racing by Pratt Miller Motorsports	812

GTD Teams' Championship standings
Pos.	+/–	Team	Points
1		#57 Winward Racing	1367
2		#96 Turner Motorsport	1154
3	2	#120 Wright Motorsports	1059
4	1	#32 Korthoff/Preston Motorsports	1033
5	1	#43 Andretti Motorsports	952

- Note: Only the top five positions are included for all sets of standings.

GTP Manufacturers' Championship standings
Pos.	+/–	Manufacturer	Points
1		(United States) Cadillac	1450
2		(Germany) Porsche	1440
3		(Japan) Acura	1346
4		(Germany) BMW	1264
5		(Italy) Lamborghini	286

GTD Pro Manufacturers' Championship standings
Pos.	+/–	Manufacturer	Points
1	1	(Germany) Porsche	1003
2	1	(Japan) Lexus	947
3	1	(United Kingdom) Aston Martin	880
4	2	(United States) Chevrolet	877
5	2	(United Kingdom) McLaren	851

GTD Manufacturers' Championship standings
Pos.	+/–	Manufacturer	Points
1		(Germany) Mercedes-AMG	1457
2	1	(Germany) Porsche	1208
3	1	(Italy) Lamborghini	1199
4	2	(Japan) Lexus	1178
5	3	(United Kingdom) Aston Martin	1059

- Note: Only the top five positions are included for all sets of standings.

IMSA SportsCar Championship
Previous race: Grand Prix of Long Beach	2024 season	Next race: Chevrolet Detroit Sports Car Classic
