= 2023 Sahlen's Six Hours of The Glen =

Endurance race in Watkins Glen, New York

Track map of Watkins Glen International

The 2023 Sahlen's Six Hours of The Glen was an endurance sports car race sanctioned by the International Motor Sports Association (IMSA). The race was held at Watkins Glen International in Watkins Glen, New York on June 25, 2023. The race was the fifth round of the 2023 IMSA SportsCar Championship, and the third round of the 2023 Michelin Endurance Cup.

== Background ==
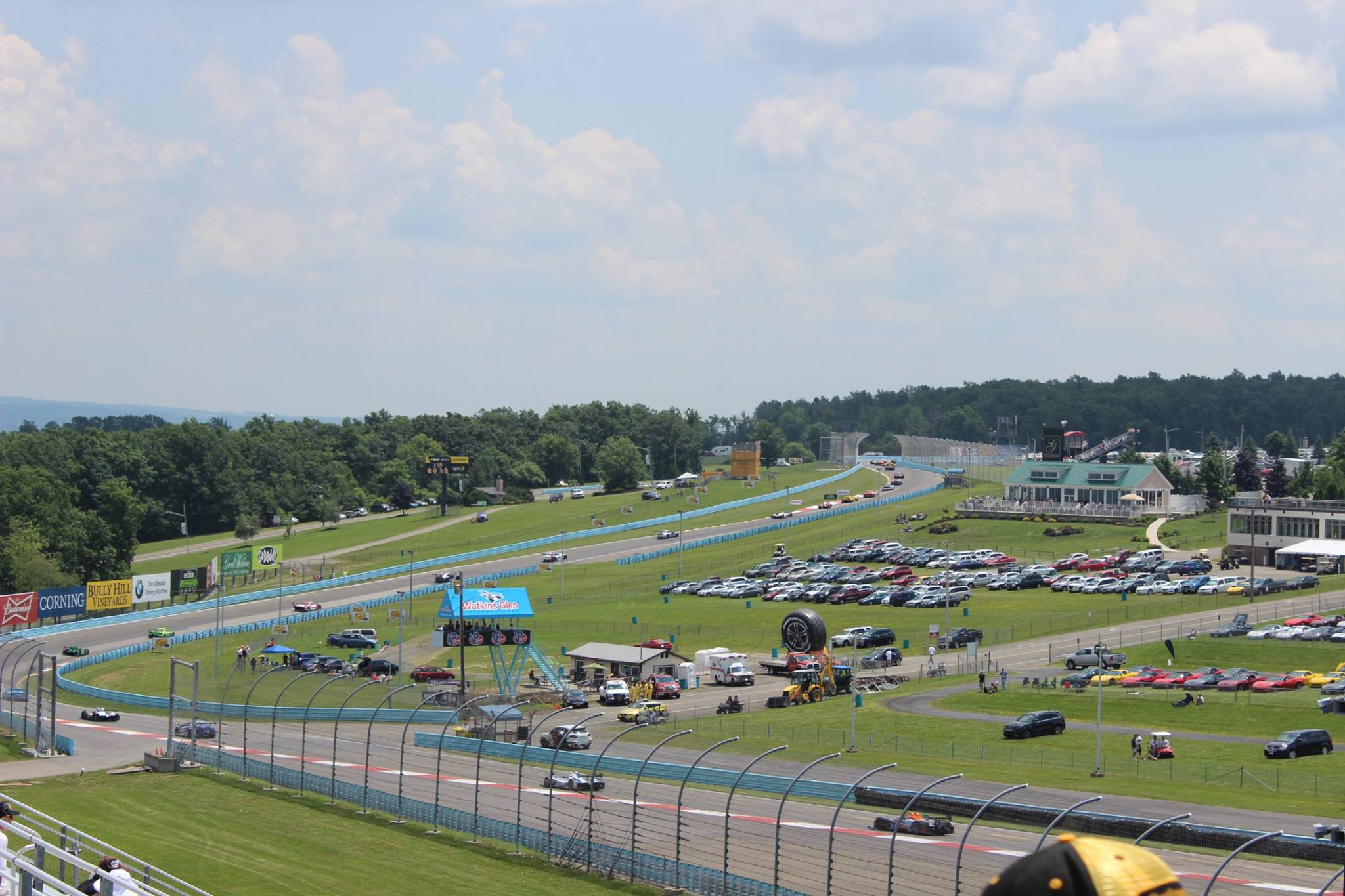
Watkins Glen International, where the race was held.

International Motor Sports Association's (IMSA) president John Doonan confirmed the race was part of the schedule for the 2023 IMSA SportsCar Championship (IMSA SCC) in August 2022. It was the ninth year the event was held as part of the WeatherTech SportsCar Championship. The 2023 Sahlen's Six Hours of The Glen was the fifth of eleven scheduled sports car races of 2023 by IMSA, and it was the third of four races of the Michelin Endurance Cup (MEC). The race was held at the eleven-turn 3.450 mi (5.552 km) Watkins Glen International on June 25, 2023.

On June 3, 2023, IMSA released the latest technical bulletin outlining Balance of Performance for the GTD and GTD Pro classes. A number of changes were made to the minimum weights of cars in the two classes, including 20 kg weight breaks for the Lamborghini, McLaren, and Mercedes. The Ferrari also received a 30 kg weight reduction, while the Corvette was handed a five kg reduction. The Corvette and Lexus also received horsepower increases following adjustments to the size of the cars' air restrictors. Finally, the Lexus received a three-liter fuel capacity increase, while the maximum fuel for the Acura was reduced by the same amount. On June 14, 2023, IMSA released the latest technical bulletin outlining BoP for the GTP class. A number of changes were made to the minimum weights of the cars. The Acura ran on 1053 kilograms of weight, the Porsche ran on 1043 kg, the BMW ran on 1038 kg and the Cadillac ran on 1037 kg. The maximum power output had been changed to 515 kilowatts of power for the Porsche, and 513 kW for both the BMW and Cadillac. The Acura remained on 520 kW.

After the Motul Course de Monterey one month earlier, Nick Tandy and Mathieu Jaminet led the GTP Drivers' Championship with 1307 points, ahead of Pipo Derani and Alexander Sims with 1282 points, and Filipe Albuquerque and Ricky Taylor with 1241 points. With 730 points, the LMP2 Drivers' Championship was led by Mikkel Jensen and Steven Thomas with a sixty-three point advantage over Paul-Loup Chatin and Ben Keating. In LMP3, the Drivers' Championship was led by Josh Burdon, Felipe Fraga, and Gar Robinson with 380 points. Ben Barnicoat and Jack Hawksworth led the GTD Pro Drivers' Championship with 1415 points ahead of Jules Gounon and Daniel Juncadella with 1374 points. In GTD, the Drivers' Championship was led by Bryan Sellers and Madison Snow with 1244 points, ahead of Brendan Iribe and Frederik Schandorff with 1182 points. Cadillac, Lexus, and BMW were leading their respective Manufacturers' Championships, while Porsche Penske Motorsport, TDS Racing, Riley Motorsports, Vasser Sullivan Racing, and Paul Miller Racing each led their own Teams' Championships.

=== Entries ===
In LMP2, AF Corse ran the No. 88 Oreca 07 machine with Nicklas Nielsen, Luis Pérez Companc, and Lilou Wadoux. Additionally, Tower Motorsport's John Farano was replaced by Salih Yoluç in the #8 entry as Farano continued to recover from an injury suffered in a crash at Laguna Seca earlier in the season. In GTD Pro, MDK Motorsports withheld their planned GTD Pro entry for an additional round after forgoing the 12 Hours of Sebring due to BoP concerns. While the concerns had long since been addressed, team principal Mark Kvamme elected to focus on the team's GT World Challenge America program, which had completed a race event at Virginia International Raceway the previous weekend. After missing Sebring, Andrea Caldarelli returned to Iron Lynx's GTD Pro lineup alongside Jordan Pepper. Furthermore, the No. 61 Ferrari 296 GT3 entered, with drivers Miguel Molina, Ulysse de Pauw, and Simon Mann. In GTD, The No. 42 NTE Sport car returned with Jaden Conwright and Luke Berkeley.

== Practice ==
There were two practice sessions preceding the start of the race on Sunday, one on Friday and one on Saturday. The first session lasted 90 minutes on Friday while the second session on Saturday lasted 105 minutes.

=== Practice 1 ===
The first practice session took place at 4:30 pm ET on Friday and ended with Colin Braun topping the charts for Meyer Shank Racing with Curb-Agajanian, with a lap time of 1:33.563.

Pos.	Class	No.	Team	Driver	Time	Gap
1	GTP	60	Meyer Shank Racing with Curb-Agajanian	Colin Braun	1:33.563	_
2	GTP	7	Porsche Penske Motorsport	Felipe Nasr	1:34.792	+1.229
3	GTP	6	Porsche Penske Motorsport	Nick Tandy	1:34.863	+1.300

=== Final Practice ===
The second and final practice session took place at 8:00 am ET on Saturday and ended with Colin Braun topping the charts for Meyer Shank Racing with Curb-Agajanian, with a lap time of 1:32.311.

Pos.	Class	No.	Team	Driver	Time	Gap
1	GTP	60	Meyer Shank Racing with Curb-Agajanian	Colin Braun	1:32.311	_
2	GTP	25	BMW M Team RLL	Connor De Phillippi	1:32.315	+0.004
3	GTP	24	BMW M Team RLL	Augusto Farfus	1:32.574	+0.263

== Qualifying ==
Qualifying was broken into three sessions. The first was for cars in the GTD Pro and GTD classes. Daniel Serra qualified on pole in GTD Pro driving the No. 62 Risi Competizione entry and the No. 78 Forte Racing powered by US RaceTronics entry driven by Loris Spinelli set the fastest time among all GTD cars.

The second session was for cars in the LMP2 and LMP3 classes. Steven Thomas and Gar Robinson were handed pole position for LMP2 and LMP3, respectively after the session did not reach minimum time to be declared official after cars aquaplaned off the track. Ari Balogh, driving the No. 30 Jr III Motorsports entry, spun into the inside wall of turn 7 before stopping alongside the tire barriers. Moments later, Ben Keating, driving the No. 52 PR1/Mathiasen Motorsports entry, aquaplaned off at turn 7 and hit the Jr III Motorsports Ligier. Not long afterwards, Anthony Mantella, driving the No. 17 AWA entry, also aquaplaned off the track at turn 7 and hit the PR1/Mathiasen Motorsports Oreca. The red flag was thrown and caused the session to be abandoned. Championship points were not awarded and starting positions were set by teams' championship standings.

The final session of qualifying was for the GTP class. Nick Tandy was handed pole position after the session was cancelled due to poor weather conditions. Championship points were not awarded and starting positions were set by teams' championship standings.

=== Qualifying results ===
Pole positions in each class are indicated in bold and by ‡.

Pos.	Class	No.	Team	Driver	Time	Gap	Grid
1	**GTD**	**78**	**Forte Racing powered by US RaceTronics**	**(Italy) Loris Spinelli**	**1:44.430**	**_**	29‡
2	**GTD Pro**	**62**	**Risi Competizione**	**(Brazil) Daniel Serra**	**1:44.829**	**+0.399**	30‡
3	GTD Pro	63	Iron Lynx	(South Africa) Jordan Pepper	1:45.139	+0.709	31
4	GTD	12	Vasser Sullivan Racing	(United States) Aaron Telitz	1:45.203	+0.773	32
5	GTD Pro	14	Vasser Sullivan Racing	(United Kingdom) Jack Hawksworth	1:45.297	+0.867	33
6	GTD	83	Iron Dames	(France) Doriane Pin	1:45.325	+0.895	34
7	GTD	1	Paul Miller Racing	(United States) Madison Snow	1:45.434	+1.004	35
8	GTD Pro	79	WeatherTech Racing	(Andorra) Jules Gounon	1:46.058	+1.628	36
9	GTD Pro	3	Corvette Racing	(United States) Jordan Taylor	1:46.168	+1.738	37
10	GTD Pro	9	Pfaff Motorsports	(France) Patrick Pilet	1:46.299	+1.869	38
11	GTD Pro	95	Turner Motorsport	(United States) Bill Auberlen	1:46.450	+2.020	39
12	GTD	27	Heart of Racing Team	(United Kingdom) Ian James	1:46.577	+2.147	40
13	GTD	42	NTE Sport	(United States) Jaden Conwright	1:46.643	+2.213	41
14	GTD	32	Team Korthoff Motorsports	(United States) Mike Skeen	1:46.741	+2.311	42
15	GTD	70	Inception Racing	(United States) Brendan Iribe	1:47.118	+2.688	43
16	GTD	96	Turner Motorsport	(United States) Patrick Gallagher	1:47.168	+2.738	44
17	GTD	57	Winward Racing	(United States) Russell Ward	1:47.553	+3.123	45
18	GTD	91	Kelly-Moss with Riley	(United States) Alan Metni	1:47.592	+3.162	46
19	GTD	44	Magnus Racing	(United States) John Potter	1:47.597	+3.167	47
20	GTD	80	AO Racing Team	(United States) P. J. Hyett	1:48.187	+3.757	48
21	GTD	023	Triarsi Competizione	(United States) Charlie Scardina	1:48.390	+3.960	49
22	GTD	16	Wright Motorsports	(United States) Ryan Hardwick	1:48.484	+4.054	50
23	GTD	66	Gradient Racing	(United States) Sheena Monk	1:48.514	+4.084	51
24	GTD	77	Wright Motorsports	(United States) Alan Brynjolfsson	1:48.726	+4.296	52
25	GTD	47	Cetilar Racing	(Italy) Roberto Lacorte	1:49.878	+5.448	53
26	GTD	93	Racer's Edge Motorsports with WTR Andretti	(United States) Ashton Harrison	1:50.581	+6.151	54
27	GTD Pro	61	AF Corse	(United Kingdom) Simon Mann	1:50.642	+6.212	55
28	GTD	92	Kelly-Moss with Riley	(United States) David Brule	1:52.854	+8.424	56
29	GTP	01	Cadillac Racing	No Time Established			4
30	LMP2	04	CrowdStrike Racing by APR	No Time Established			13
31	LMP3	4	Ave Motorsports	No Time Established			23
32	GTP	5	JDC-Miller MotorSports	No Time Established			9
33	GTP	6	Porsche Penske Motorsport	No Time Established			1‡
34	GTP	7	Porsche Penske Motorsport	No Time Established			6
35	LMP2	8	Tower Motorsports	No Time Established			12
36	GTP	10	Wayne Taylor Racing with Andretti Autosport	No Time Established			3
37	LMP2	11	TDS Racing	No Time Established			10‡
38	LMP3	13	AWA	No Time Established			20
39	LMP3	17	AWA	No Time Established			39
40	LMP2	18	Era Motorsport	No Time Established			14
41	LMP2	20	High Class Racing	No Time Established			16
42	GTD Pro	23	Heart of Racing Team	Did Not Participate			57
43	GTP	24	BMW M Team RLL	No Time Established			7
44	GTP	25	BMW M Team RLL	No Time Established			5
45	LMP3	30	Jr III Motorsports	No Time Established			26
46	GTP	31	Whelen Engineering Racing	No Time Established			2
47	LMP3	33	Sean Creech Motorsport	No Time Established			25
48	LMP2	35	TDS Racing	No Time Established			15
49	LMP3	36	Andretti Autosport	No Time Established			27
50	LMP3	38	Performance Tech Motorsports	No Time Established			24
51	LMP2	51	Rick Ware Racing	No Time Established			17
52	LMP2	52	PR1/Mathiasen Motorsports	No Time Established			11
53	LMP3	54	MLT Motorsports	No Time Established			28
54	GTP	60	Meyer Shank Racing with Curb-Agajanian	No Time Established			8
55	LMP3	74	Riley Motorsports	No Time Established			19‡
56	LMP3	85	JDC-Miller MotorSports	No Time Established			21
57	LMP2	88	AF Corse	No Time Established			18

== Race ==
=== Post-race ===
The race-winning No. 25 BMW M Hybrid V8.

As a result of being disqualified, Tandy and Jaminet dropped from first to third in the GTP Drivers' Championship. De Phillippi and Yelloly advanced from fifth to second while Derani and Sims took the championship lead. Hanley and Kurtz advanced from fourth to first in the LMP2 Drivers' Championship. Burdon, Fraga, and Robinson extended their advantage in the LMP3 Drivers' Championship over Boyd, Mantella, and Varrone to 124 points. In the GTD Pro Drivers' Championship, Barnicoat and Hawksworth extended their lead to 113 points over Gounon and Juncadella while García and Taylor moved from third after being fourth coming into Watkins Glen. The result kept Sellers and Snow atop the GTD Drivers' Championship while Montecalvo and Telitz advanced from fourth to second. Cadillac, Lexus, and BMW continued to top their respective Manufacturers' Championships, while Riley Motorsports, Vasser Sullivan Racing, and Paul Miller Racing kept their respective advantages in their respective of Teams' Championships. Whelen Engineering Racing and CrowdStrike Racing by APR took the lead in their respective Teams' Championships with six races left in the season.

=== Results ===
Class winners are in bold and ‡.

Pos	Class	No	Team	Drivers	Chassis	Laps	Time/Retired
Pos	Class	No	Team	Drivers	Engine	Laps	Time/Retired
1	**GTP**	**25**	**(United States) BMW M Team RLL**	**(United States) Connor De Phillippi (United Kingdom) Nick Yelloly**	**BMW M Hybrid V8**	**201**	**6:03:09.715‡**
1	**GTP**	**25**	**(United States) BMW M Team RLL**	**(United States) Connor De Phillippi (United Kingdom) Nick Yelloly**	**BMW P66/3 4.0 L Turbo V8**	**201**	**6:03:09.715‡**
2	GTP	31	(United States) Whelen Engineering Racing	(United Kingdom) Jack Aitken (Brazil) Pipo Derani (United Kingdom) Alexander Sims	Cadillac V-Series.R	201	+12.078
2	GTP	31	(United States) Whelen Engineering Racing	(United Kingdom) Jack Aitken (Brazil) Pipo Derani (United Kingdom) Alexander Sims	Cadillac LMC55R 5.5 L V8	201	+12.078
3	GTP	60	(United States) Meyer Shank Racing with Curb-Agajanian	(United Kingdom) Tom Blomqvist (United States) Colin Braun	Acura ARX-06	201	+20.421
3	GTP	60	(United States) Meyer Shank Racing with Curb-Agajanian	(United Kingdom) Tom Blomqvist (United States) Colin Braun	Acura AR24e 2.4 L Turbo V6	201	+20.421
4	GTP	5	(United States) JDC-Miller MotorSports	(Germany) Mike Rockenfeller (Netherlands) Tijmen van der Helm	Porsche 963	199	+2 Laps
4	GTP	5	(United States) JDC-Miller MotorSports	(Germany) Mike Rockenfeller (Netherlands) Tijmen van der Helm	Porsche 9RD 4.6 L Turbo V8	199	+2 Laps
5	GTP	01	(United States) Cadillac Racing	(France) Sébastien Bourdais (Netherlands) Renger van der Zande	Cadillac V-Series.R	197	+4 Laps
5	GTP	01	(United States) Cadillac Racing	(France) Sébastien Bourdais (Netherlands) Renger van der Zande	Cadillac LMC55R 5.5 L V8	197	+4 Laps
6	**LMP2**	**04**	**(United States) CrowdStrike Racing by APR**	**(United Kingdom) Ben Hanley (United States) George Kurtz (United States) Nolan Siegel**	**Oreca 07**	**196**	**+5 Laps‡**
6	**LMP2**	**04**	**(United States) CrowdStrike Racing by APR**	**(United Kingdom) Ben Hanley (United States) George Kurtz (United States) Nolan Siegel**	**Gibson GK428 4.2 L V8 engine**	**196**	**+5 Laps‡**
7	LMP2	18	(United States) Era Motorsport	(United Kingdom) Ryan Dalziel (United States) Dwight Merriman (Denmark) Christian Rasmussen	Oreca 07	196	+5 Laps
7	LMP2	18	(United States) Era Motorsport	(United Kingdom) Ryan Dalziel (United States) Dwight Merriman (Denmark) Christian Rasmussen	Gibson GK428 4.2 L V8 engine	196	+5 Laps
8	LMP2	52	(United States) PR1/Mathiasen Motorsports	(France) Paul-Loup Chatin (United States) Ben Keating (United Kingdom) Alex Quinn	Oreca 07	196	+5 Laps
8	LMP2	52	(United States) PR1/Mathiasen Motorsports	(France) Paul-Loup Chatin (United States) Ben Keating (United Kingdom) Alex Quinn	Gibson GK428 4.2 L V8 engine	196	+5 Laps
9	LMP2	35	(France) TDS Racing	(United States) John Falb (Netherlands) Giedo van der Garde (United States) Josh Pierson	Oreca 07	195	+6 Laps
9	LMP2	35	(France) TDS Racing	(United States) John Falb (Netherlands) Giedo van der Garde (United States) Josh Pierson	Gibson GK428 4.2 L V8 engine	195	+6 Laps
10	LMP2	8	(United States) Tower Motorsports	(Barbados) Kyffin Simpson (United Kingdom) Will Stevens (Turkey) Salih Yoluç	Oreca 07	195	+6 Laps
10	LMP2	8	(United States) Tower Motorsports	(Barbados) Kyffin Simpson (United Kingdom) Will Stevens (Turkey) Salih Yoluç	Gibson GK428 4.2 L V8 engine	195	+6 Laps
11	LMP2	88	(Italy) AF Corse	(Denmark) Nicklas Nielsen (Argentina) Luis Pérez Companc (France) Lilou Wadoux	Oreca 07	193	+8 Laps
11	LMP2	88	(Italy) AF Corse	(Denmark) Nicklas Nielsen (Argentina) Luis Pérez Companc (France) Lilou Wadoux	Gibson GK428 4.2 L V8 engine	193	+8 Laps
12	**LMP3**	**74**	**(United States) Riley Motorsports**	**(Australia) Josh Burdon (Brazil) Felipe Fraga (United States) Gar Robinson**	**Ligier JS P320**	**189**	**+12 Laps‡**
12	**LMP3**	**74**	**(United States) Riley Motorsports**	**(Australia) Josh Burdon (Brazil) Felipe Fraga (United States) Gar Robinson**	**Nissan VK56DE 5.6L V8 engine**	**189**	**+12 Laps‡**
13	LMP3	30	(United States) Jr III Motorsports	(United States) Ari Balogh (United States) Dakota Dickerson (Canada) Garett Grist	Ligier JS P320	189	+12 Laps
13	LMP3	30	(United States) Jr III Motorsports	(United States) Ari Balogh (United States) Dakota Dickerson (Canada) Garett Grist	Nissan VK56DE 5.6L V8 engine	189	+12 Laps
14	LMP3	17	(Canada) AWA	(United Kingdom) Wayne Boyd (Canada) Anthony Mantella (Argentina) Nicolás Varrone	Duqueine M30 - D08	189	+12 Laps
14	LMP3	17	(Canada) AWA	(United Kingdom) Wayne Boyd (Canada) Anthony Mantella (Argentina) Nicolás Varrone	Nissan VK56DE 5.6L V8 engine	189	+12 Laps
15	LMP3	36	(United States) Andretti Autosport	(United States) Jarett Andretti (Netherlands) Glenn van Berlo (Colombia) Gabby Chaves	Ligier JS P320	188	+13 Laps
15	LMP3	36	(United States) Andretti Autosport	(United States) Jarett Andretti (Netherlands) Glenn van Berlo (Colombia) Gabby Chaves	Nissan VK56DE 5.6L V8 engine	188	+13 Laps
16	LMP3	13	(Canada) AWA	(United Kingdom) Matt Bell (Canada) Orey Fidani (Germany) Lars Kern	Duqueine M30 - D08	188	+13 Laps
16	LMP3	13	(Canada) AWA	(United Kingdom) Matt Bell (Canada) Orey Fidani (Germany) Lars Kern	Nissan VK56DE 5.6L V8 engine	188	+13 Laps
17	LMP3	4	(United States) Ave Motorsports	(United States) Trenton Estep (Estonia) Tõnis Kasemets (United States) Seth Lucas	Ligier JS P320	187	+14 Laps
17	LMP3	4	(United States) Ave Motorsports	(United States) Trenton Estep (Estonia) Tõnis Kasemets (United States) Seth Lucas	Nissan VK56DE 5.6L V8 engine	187	+14 Laps
18	LMP3	33	(United States) Sean Creech Motorsport	(Portugal) João Barbosa (Chile) Nico Pino (United States) Lance Willsey	Ligier JS P320	187	+14 Laps
18	LMP3	33	(United States) Sean Creech Motorsport	(Portugal) João Barbosa (Chile) Nico Pino (United States) Lance Willsey	Nissan VK56DE 5.6L V8 engine	187	+14 Laps
19	LMP3	54	(United States) MLT Motorsports	(United Kingdom) Stevan McAleer (United States) Andrew Pinkerton (United States) Jason Rabe	Ligier JS P320	185	+16 Laps
19	LMP3	54	(United States) MLT Motorsports	(United Kingdom) Stevan McAleer (United States) Andrew Pinkerton (United States) Jason Rabe	Nissan VK56DE 5.6L V8 engine	185	+16 Laps
20	**GTD**	**12**	**(United States) Vasser Sullivan Racing**	**(United States) Frankie Montecalvo (United States) Aaron Telitz (Canada) Parker Thompson**	**Lexus RC F GT3**	**183**	**+18 Laps‡**
20	**GTD**	**12**	**(United States) Vasser Sullivan Racing**	**(United States) Frankie Montecalvo (United States) Aaron Telitz (Canada) Parker Thompson**	**Toyota 2UR 5.0 L V8**	**183**	**+18 Laps‡**
21	**GTD Pro**	**14**	**(United States) Vasser Sullivan Racing**	**(United Kingdom) Ben Barnicoat (United Kingdom) Jack Hawksworth**	**Lexus RC F GT3**	**183**	**+18 Laps‡**
21	**GTD Pro**	**14**	**(United States) Vasser Sullivan Racing**	**(United Kingdom) Ben Barnicoat (United Kingdom) Jack Hawksworth**	**Toyota 2UR 5.0 L V8**	**183**	**+18 Laps‡**
22	GTD Pro	62	(United States) Risi Competizione	(Italy) Davide Rigon (Brazil) Daniel Serra	Ferrari 296 GT3	183	+18 Laps
22	GTD Pro	62	(United States) Risi Competizione	(Italy) Davide Rigon (Brazil) Daniel Serra	Ferrari 3.0 L Turbo V6	183	+18 Laps
23	GTD Pro	3	(United States) Corvette Racing	(Spain) Antonio García (United States) Jordan Taylor	Chevrolet Corvette C8.R GTD	183	+18 Laps
23	GTD Pro	3	(United States) Corvette Racing	(Spain) Antonio García (United States) Jordan Taylor	Chevrolet 5.5 L V8	183	+18 Laps
24	GTD Pro	79	(United States) WeatherTech Racing	(Andorra) Jules Gounon (Spain) Daniel Juncadella	Mercedes-AMG GT3 Evo	183	+18 Laps
24	GTD Pro	79	(United States) WeatherTech Racing	(Andorra) Jules Gounon (Spain) Daniel Juncadella	Mercedes-AMG M159 6.2 L V8	183	+18 Laps
25	GTD	1	(United States) Paul Miller Racing	(United States) Corey Lewis (United States) Bryan Sellers (United States) Madison Snow	BMW M4 GT3	183	+18 Laps
25	GTD	1	(United States) Paul Miller Racing	(United States) Corey Lewis (United States) Bryan Sellers (United States) Madison Snow	BMW S58B30T0 3.0 L Turbo I6	183	+18 Laps
26	GTD	16	(United States) Wright Motorsports	(United States) Ryan Hardwick (Belgium) Jan Heylen (Canada) Zacharie Robichon	Porsche 911 GT3 R (992)	183	+18 Laps
26	GTD	16	(United States) Wright Motorsports	(United States) Ryan Hardwick (Belgium) Jan Heylen (Canada) Zacharie Robichon	Porsche 4.2 L Flat-6	183	+18 Laps
27	GTD	023	(United States) Triarsi Competizione	(Italy) Alessio Rovera (United States) Charlie Scardina (United States) Onofrio Triarsi	Ferrari 296 GT3	183	+18 Laps
27	GTD	023	(United States) Triarsi Competizione	(Italy) Alessio Rovera (United States) Charlie Scardina (United States) Onofrio Triarsi	Ferrari 3.0 L Turbo V6	183	+18 Laps
28	GTD	66	(United States) Gradient Racing	(United Kingdom) Katherine Legge (United States) Marc Miller (United States) Sheena Monk	Acura NSX GT3 Evo22	183	+18 Laps
28	GTD	66	(United States) Gradient Racing	(United Kingdom) Katherine Legge (United States) Marc Miller (United States) Sheena Monk	Acura 3.5 L Turbo V6	183	+18 Laps
29	GTD Pro	9	(Canada) Pfaff Motorsports	(Austria) Klaus Bachler (France) Patrick Pilet	Porsche 911 GT3 R (992)	183	+18 Laps
29	GTD Pro	9	(Canada) Pfaff Motorsports	(Austria) Klaus Bachler (France) Patrick Pilet	Porsche 4.2 L Flat-6	183	+18 Laps
30	GTD	27	(United States) Heart of Racing Team	(Canada) Roman De Angelis (United Kingdom) Ian James (Denmark) Marco Sørensen	Aston Martin Vantage AMR GT3	183	+18 Laps
30	GTD	27	(United States) Heart of Racing Team	(Canada) Roman De Angelis (United Kingdom) Ian James (Denmark) Marco Sørensen	Aston Martin 4.0 L Turbo V8	183	+18 Laps
31	GTD Pro	23	(United States) Heart of Racing Team	(United Kingdom) Ross Gunn (Spain) Alex Riberas	Aston Martin Vantage AMR GT3	183	+18 Laps
31	GTD Pro	23	(United States) Heart of Racing Team	(United Kingdom) Ross Gunn (Spain) Alex Riberas	Aston Martin 4.0 L Turbo V8	183	+18 Laps
32	GTD	78	(United States) Forte Racing powered by US RaceTronics	(Canada) Misha Goikhberg (United States) Patrick Liddy (Italy) Loris Spinelli	Lamborghini Huracán GT3 Evo 2	183	+18 Laps
32	GTD	78	(United States) Forte Racing powered by US RaceTronics	(Canada) Misha Goikhberg (United States) Patrick Liddy (Italy) Loris Spinelli	Lamborghini 5.2 L V10	183	+18 Laps
33	GTD	93	(United States) Racers Edge Motorsports with WTR Andretti	(Costa Rica) Danny Formal (United States) Ashton Harrison (Canada) Kyle Marcelli	Acura NSX GT3 Evo22	183	+18 Laps
33	GTD	93	(United States) Racers Edge Motorsports with WTR Andretti	(Costa Rica) Danny Formal (United States) Ashton Harrison (Canada) Kyle Marcelli	Acura 3.5 L Turbo V6	183	+18 Laps
34	GTD	44	(United States) Magnus Racing	(United States) Andy Lally (United States) John Potter (United States) Spencer Pumpelly	Aston Martin Vantage AMR GT3	183	+18 Laps
34	GTD	44	(United States) Magnus Racing	(United States) Andy Lally (United States) John Potter (United States) Spencer Pumpelly	Aston Martin 4.0 L Turbo V8	183	+18 Laps
35	GTD	92	(United States) Kelly-Moss with Riley	(France) Julien Andlauer (United States) David Brule (United States) Alec Udell	Porsche 911 GT3 R (992)	183	+18 Laps
35	GTD	92	(United States) Kelly-Moss with Riley	(France) Julien Andlauer (United States) David Brule (United States) Alec Udell	Porsche 4.2 L Flat-6	183	+18 Laps
36	LMP3	85	(United States) JDC-Miller MotorSports	(United Kingdom) Till Bechtolsheimer (United States) Dan Goldburg (Sweden) Rasmus Lindh	Duqueine M30 - D08	182	+19 Laps
36	LMP3	85	(United States) JDC-Miller MotorSports	(United Kingdom) Till Bechtolsheimer (United States) Dan Goldburg (Sweden) Rasmus Lindh	Nissan VK56DE 5.6L V8 engine	182	+19 Laps
37	GTD	77	(United States) Wright Motorsports	(United States) Alan Brynjolfsson (United States) Trent Hindman (United States) Maxwell Root	Porsche 911 GT3 R (992)	182	+19 Laps
37	GTD	77	(United States) Wright Motorsports	(United States) Alan Brynjolfsson (United States) Trent Hindman (United States) Maxwell Root	Porsche 4.2 L Flat-6	182	+19 Laps
38	GTD	32	(United States) Team Korthoff Motorsports	(Canada) Mikaël Grenier (United States) Kenton Koch (United States) Mike Skeen	Mercedes-AMG GT3 Evo	182	+19 Laps
38	GTD	32	(United States) Team Korthoff Motorsports	(Canada) Mikaël Grenier (United States) Kenton Koch (United States) Mike Skeen	Mercedes-AMG M159 6.2 L V8	182	+19 Laps
39	LMP2	11	(France) TDS Racing	(United States) Scott Huffaker (Denmark) Mikkel Jensen (United States) Steven Thomas	Oreca 07	182	+19 Laps
39	LMP2	11	(France) TDS Racing	(United States) Scott Huffaker (Denmark) Mikkel Jensen (United States) Steven Thomas	Gibson GK428 4.2 L V8 engine	182	+19 Laps
40	GTD	96	(United States) Turner Motorsport	(United States) Michael Dinan (United States) Robby Foley (United States) Patrick Gallagher	BMW M4 GT3	182	+19 Laps
40	GTD	96	(United States) Turner Motorsport	(United States) Michael Dinan (United States) Robby Foley (United States) Patrick Gallagher	BMW S58B30T0 3.0 L Turbo I6	182	+19 Laps
41	GTD	80	(United States) AO Racing Team	(United States) P.J. Hyett (United States) Gunnar Jeannette (United Kingdom) Sebastian Priaulx	Porsche 911 GT3 R (992)	182	+19 Laps
41	GTD	80	(United States) AO Racing Team	(United States) P.J. Hyett (United States) Gunnar Jeannette (United Kingdom) Sebastian Priaulx	Porsche 4.2 L Flat-6	182	+19 Laps
42	GTD	70	(United Kingdom) Inception Racing	(United States) Brendan Iribe (United Kingdom) Ollie Millroy (Denmark) Frederik Schandorff	McLaren 720S GT3 Evo	182	+19 Laps
42	GTD	70	(United Kingdom) Inception Racing	(United States) Brendan Iribe (United Kingdom) Ollie Millroy (Denmark) Frederik Schandorff	McLaren M840T 4.0 L Turbo V8	182	+19 Laps
43	GTD	83	(Italy) Iron Dames	(Switzerland) Rahel Frey (Denmark) Michelle Gatting (France) Doriane Pin	Lamborghini Huracán GT3 Evo 2	182	+19 Laps
43	GTD	83	(Italy) Iron Dames	(Switzerland) Rahel Frey (Denmark) Michelle Gatting (France) Doriane Pin	Lamborghini 5.2 L V10	182	+19 Laps
44	GTD	91	(United States) Kelly-Moss with Riley	(Netherlands) Kay van Berlo (New Zealand) Jaxon Evans (United States) Alan Metni	Porsche 911 GT3 R (992)	181	+20 Laps
44	GTD	91	(United States) Kelly-Moss with Riley	(Netherlands) Kay van Berlo (New Zealand) Jaxon Evans (United States) Alan Metni	Porsche 4.2 L Flat-6	181	+20 Laps
45 DNF	GTD Pro	95	(United States) Turner Motorsport	(United States) Bill Auberlen (United States) John Edwards (United States) Chandler Hull	BMW M4 GT3	179	Accident
45 DNF	GTD Pro	95	(United States) Turner Motorsport	(United States) Bill Auberlen (United States) John Edwards (United States) Chandler Hull	BMW S58B30T0 3.0 L Turbo I6	179	Accident
46 DNF	GTP	10	(United States) Wayne Taylor Racing with Andretti Autosport	(Portugal) Filipe Albuquerque (Switzerland) Louis Delétraz (United States) Ricky Taylor	Acura ARX-06	176	Mechanical
46 DNF	GTP	10	(United States) Wayne Taylor Racing with Andretti Autosport	(Portugal) Filipe Albuquerque (Switzerland) Louis Delétraz (United States) Ricky Taylor	Acura AR24e 2.4 L Turbo V6	176	Mechanical
47 DNF	GTD	47	(Italy) Cetilar Racing	(Italy) Antonio Fuoco (Italy) Roberto Lacorte (Italy) Giorgio Sernagiotto	Ferrari 296 GT3	158	Mechanical
47 DNF	GTD	47	(Italy) Cetilar Racing	(Italy) Antonio Fuoco (Italy) Roberto Lacorte (Italy) Giorgio Sernagiotto	Ferrari 3.0 L Turbo V6	158	Mechanical
48 DNF	GTD Pro	61	(Italy) AF Corse	(United Kingdom) Simon Mann (Spain) Miguel Molina (Belgium) Ulysse de Pauw	Ferrari 296 GT3	134	Mechanical
48 DNF	GTD Pro	61	(Italy) AF Corse	(United Kingdom) Simon Mann (Spain) Miguel Molina (Belgium) Ulysse de Pauw	Ferrari 3.0 L Turbo V6	134	Mechanical
49 DNF	LMP3	38	(United States) Performance Tech Motorsports	(United States) Christopher Allen (United States) Connor Bloum (United States) Alex Kirby	Ligier JS P320	109	Accident
49 DNF	LMP3	38	(United States) Performance Tech Motorsports	(United States) Christopher Allen (United States) Connor Bloum (United States) Alex Kirby	Nissan VK56DE 5.6L V8 engine	109	Accident
50 DNF	GTD Pro	63	(Italy) Iron Lynx	(Italy) Andrea Caldarelli (South Africa) Jordan Pepper	Lamborghini Huracán GT3 Evo 2	108	Accident
50 DNF	GTD Pro	63	(Italy) Iron Lynx	(Italy) Andrea Caldarelli (South Africa) Jordan Pepper	Lamborghini 5.2 L V10	108	Accident
51 DNF	GTD	42	(United States) NTE Sport	(United States) Luke Berkeley (United States) Jaden Conwright (United States) Rob Ferriol	Lamborghini Huracán GT3 Evo 2	105	Accident
51 DNF	GTD	42	(United States) NTE Sport	(United States) Luke Berkeley (United States) Jaden Conwright (United States) Rob Ferriol	Lamborghini 5.2 L V10	105	Accident
52	GTP	7	(Germany) Porsche Penske Motorsport	(Australia) Matt Campbell (Brazil) Felipe Nasr	Porsche 963	100	+101 Laps
52	GTP	7	(Germany) Porsche Penske Motorsport	(Australia) Matt Campbell (Brazil) Felipe Nasr	Porsche 9RD 4.6 L Turbo V8	100	+101 Laps
53 DNF	LMP2	20	(Denmark) High Class Racing	(Denmark) Dennis Andersen (Denmark) Anders Fjordbach (United Arab Emirates) Ed Jones (United States) Mark Kvamme	Oreca 07	60	Mechanical
53 DNF	LMP2	20	(Denmark) High Class Racing	(Denmark) Dennis Andersen (Denmark) Anders Fjordbach (United Arab Emirates) Ed Jones (United States) Mark Kvamme	Gibson GK428 4.2 L V8 engine	60	Mechanical
54 DNF	GTD	57	(United States) Winward Racing	(Netherlands) Indy Dontje (Switzerland) Raffaele Marciello (United States) Russell Ward	Mercedes-AMG GT3 Evo	32	Mechanical
54 DNF	GTD	57	(United States) Winward Racing	(Netherlands) Indy Dontje (Switzerland) Raffaele Marciello (United States) Russell Ward	Mercedes-AMG M159 6.2 L V8	32	Mechanical
55 DNF	LMP2	51	(United States) Rick Ware Racing	(Canada) Devlin DeFrancesco (Brazil) Pietro Fittipaldi (United States) Eric Lux	Oreca 07	7	Wheel Hub
55 DNF	LMP2	51	(United States) Rick Ware Racing	(Canada) Devlin DeFrancesco (Brazil) Pietro Fittipaldi (United States) Eric Lux	Gibson GK428 4.2 L V8 engine	7	Wheel Hub
56 DNF	GTP	24	(United States) BMW M Team RLL	(Austria) Philipp Eng (Brazil) Augusto Farfus	BMW M Hybrid V8	0	Crash
56 DNF	GTP	24	(United States) BMW M Team RLL	(Austria) Philipp Eng (Brazil) Augusto Farfus	BMW P66/3 4.0 L Turbo V8	0	Crash
57	GTP	6	(Germany) Porsche Penske Motorsport	(France) Mathieu Jaminet (United Kingdom) Nick Tandy	Porsche 963	201	-2.120 (Note: The No. 6 Porsche 963 was moved to the back of the GTP class after post-race technical inspection showed that the skid block measured less than the permitted minimum thickness.)
57	GTP	6	(Germany) Porsche Penske Motorsport	(France) Mathieu Jaminet (United Kingdom) Nick Tandy	Porsche 9RD 4.6 L Turbo V8	201	-2.120
OFFICIAL RESULTS

== Standings after the race ==
GTP Drivers' Championship standings
Pos.	+/–	Driver	Points
1	1	(Brazil) Pipo Derani (United Kingdom) Alexander Sims	1602
2	3	(United States) Connor De Phillippi (United Kingdom) Nick Yelloly	1583
3	1	(United Kingdom) Nick Tandy (France) Mathieu Jaminet	1527
4		(France) Sébastien Bourdais (Netherlands) Renger van der Zande	1495
5	2	(Portugal) Filipe Albuquerque (United States) Ricky Taylor	1491

LMP2 Drivers' Championship standings
Pos.	+/–	Driver	Points
1	3	(United Kingdom) Ben Hanley (United States) George Kurtz	973
2	1	(Denmark) Mikkel Jensen (United States) Steven Thomas	970
3	1	(France) Paul-Loup Chatin (United States) Ben Keating	967
4	1	(United Kingdom) Ryan Dalziel (United States) Dwight Merriman	906
5	1	(Netherlands) Giedo van der Garde	850

LMP3 Drivers' Championship standings
Pos.	+/–	Driver	Points
1		(Australia) Josh Burdon (Brazil) Felipe Fraga (United States) Gar Robinson	730
2	3	(United Kingdom) Wayne Boyd (Canada) Anthony Mantella (Argentina) Nicolás Varrone	606
3	1	(United Kingdom) Matt Bell (Canada) Orey Fidani (Germany) Lars Kern	604
4	6	(United States) Dakota Dickerson (Canada) Garett Grist	578
5	2	(United Kingdom) Till Bechtolsheimer (United States) Dan Goldburg	552

GTD Pro Drivers' Championship standings
Pos.	+/–	Driver	Points
1		(United Kingdom) Ben Barnicoat (United Kingdom) Jack Hawksworth	1795
2		(Andorra) Jules Gounon (Spain) Daniel Juncadella	1682
3	1	(Spain) Antonio García (United States) Jordan Taylor	1623
4	1	(Austria) Klaus Bachler (France) Patrick Pilet	1609
5		(United Kingdom) Ross Gunn (Spain) Alex Riberas	1408

GTD Drivers' Championship standings
Pos.	+/–	Driver	Points
1		(United States) Bryan Sellers (United States) Madison Snow	1592
2	2	(United States) Frankie Montecalvo (United States) Aaron Telitz	1488
3		(Canada) Roman De Angelis (Denmark) Marco Sørensen	1447
4	2	(United States) Brendan Iribe (Denmark) Frederik Schandorff	1365
5		(United States) Robby Foley (United States) Patrick Gallagher	1225

- Note: Only the top five positions are included for all sets of standings.

GTP Teams' Championship standings
Pos.	+/–	Team	Points
1	1	(United States) #31 Whelen Engineering Racing	1602
2	3	(United States) #25 BMW M Team RLL	1538
3	2	(Germany) #6 Porsche Penske Motorsport	1527
4		(United States) #01 Cadillac Racing	1495
5	2	(United States) #10 WTR with Andretti Autosport	1491

LMP2 Teams' Championship standings
Pos.	+/–	Team	Points
1	3	(United States) #04 CrowdStrike Racing by APR	973
2	1	(France) #11 TDS Racing	970
3	1	(United States) #52 PR1/Mathiasen Motorsports	967
4	1	(United States) #18 Era Motorsport	906
5	2	(United States) #8 Tower Motorsports	889

LMP3 Teams' Championship standings
Pos.	+/–	Team	Points
1		(United States) #74 Riley Motorsports	730
2	2	(Canada) #17 AWA	606
3	1	(Canada) #13 AWA	604
4	4	(United States) #30 Jr III Motorsports	578
5	2	(United States) #85 JDC-Miller MotorSports	552

GTD Pro Teams' Championship standings
Pos.	+/–	Team	Points
1		(United States) #14 Vasser Sullivan Racing	1795
2		(United States) #79 WeatherTech Racing	1682
3	1	(United States) #3 Corvette Racing	1623
4	1	(Canada) #9 Pfaff Motorsports	1609
5		(United States) #23 Heart of Racing Team	1408

GTD Teams' Championship standings
Pos.	+/–	Team	Points
1		(United States) #1 Paul Miller Racing	1592
2	2	(United States) #12 Vasser Sullivan Racing	1488
3		(United States) #27 Heart of Racing Team	1447
4	2	(United Kingdom) #70 Inception Racing	1365
5		(United States) #96 Turner Motorsport	1225

- Note: Only the top five positions are included for all sets of standings.

GTP Manufacturers' Championship standings
Pos.	+/–	Manufacturer	Points
1		(United States) Cadillac	1767
2	2	(Germany) BMW	1684
3	1	(Germany) Porsche	1655
4	1	(Japan) Acura	1644

GTD Pro Manufacturers' Championship standings
Pos.	+/–	Manufacturer	Points
1		(Japan) Lexus	1795
2		(Germany) Mercedes-AMG	1682
3	1	(United States) Chevrolet	1623
4	1	(Germany) Porsche	1609
5		(United Kingdom) Aston Martin	1419

GTD Manufacturers' Championship standings
Pos.	+/–	Manufacturer	Points
1		(Germany) BMW	1728
2		(United Kingdom) Aston Martin	1626
3	2	(Japan) Lexus	1592
4	1	(Germany) Porsche	1575
5	2	(United Kingdom) McLaren	1509

- Note: Only the top five positions are included for all sets of standings.

== Notes ==
IMSA SportsCar Championship
Previous race: 2023 Motul Course de Monterey	2023 season	Next race: 2023 Chevrolet Grand Prix
