= 2024 Grand Prix of Long Beach =

Third round of the 2024 IMSA SportsCar Championship season

The layout of the Long Beach Street Circuit

The 2024 Grand Prix of Long Beach (formally known as the 2024 Acura Grand Prix of Long Beach) was a sports car race held at Long Beach Street Circuit in Long Beach, California on April 20, 2024. It was the third round of the 2024 IMSA SportsCar Championship.

== Background ==
=== Preview ===
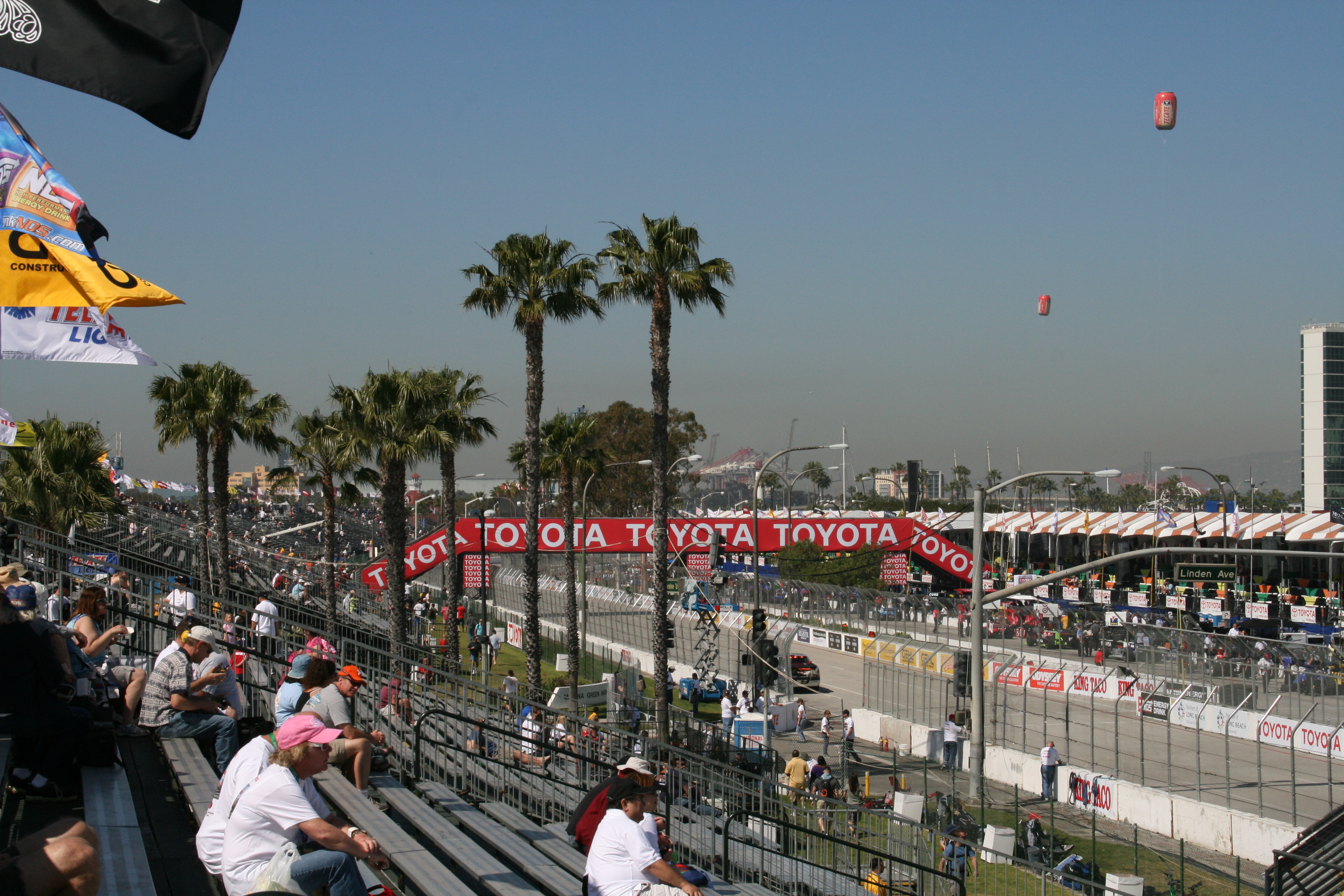
The Long Beach Street Circuit (pictured in 2009), where the race will be held.

International Motor Sports Association (IMSA) president John Doonan confirmed the race was part of the schedule of the 2024 IMSA SportsCar Championship (IMSA SCC) in August 2023. It will be the tenth year the event will be held as part of the WeatherTech SportsCar Championship, and the fifteenth annual running of the race, counting the period between 2006 and 2013 when it was a round of the Rolex Sports Car Series and the American Le Mans Series respectively. The 2024 Grand Prix of Long Beach will be the third of eleven scheduled sports car races of 2024 by IMSA. The race will be held at the 1.968 mi (3.167 km) Long Beach street circuit on April 20, 2024.

=== Balance of Performance ===
On April 8, 2024, IMSA released the latest technical bulletin outlining Balance of Performance for the GTP and GTD classes. In GTP, Acura will receive a 5-kilogram (kg) weight increase and a power increase of 3 kilowatts (kW). Cadillac keeps their 520 kW of power, but receives a 2 kg weight break compared to Sebring. BMW will also receive a 3 kW boost whilst keeping the same weight. Finally, Porsche receives a 3 kg weight increase, and 5 kW of additional power. There are no changes in BoP for the GTD class.

=== Standings before the race ===
Dane Cameron, Matt Campbell, and Felipe Nasr were leading the GTP Drivers' Championship with 706 points, with Louis Delétraz, Colton Herta, and Jordan Taylor level on points. In GTD, Indy Dontje, Philip Ellis, and Russell Ward led the championship with 725 points, 136 points ahead of Antonio Fuoco, Roberto Lacorte, and Giorgio Sernagiotto. Cadillac, Porsche, and Acura were all level on 710 points in the GTP Manufacturers' Championship, whilst Mercedes-AMG lead from Porsche and Lamborghini in GTD. Porsche Penske Motorsport and Winward Racing each led their respective Teams' Championships.

== Entry list ==
No.	Entrant	Car	Driver 1	Driver 2
GTP (Grand Touring Prototype) (10 entries)
01	(United States) Cadillac Racing	Cadillac V-Series.R	(France) Sébastien Bourdais	(Netherlands) Renger van der Zande
5	(Germany) Proton Competition Mustang Sampling	Porsche 963	(Italy) Gianmaria Bruni	(Germany) Mike Rockenfeller
6	(Germany) Porsche Penske Motorsport	Porsche 963	(France) Mathieu Jaminet	(United Kingdom) Nick Tandy
7	(Germany) Porsche Penske Motorsport	Porsche 963	(United States) Dane Cameron	(Brazil) Felipe Nasr
10	(United States) Wayne Taylor Racing with Andretti	Acura ARX-06	(Portugal) Filipe Albuquerque	(United States) Ricky Taylor
24	(United States) BMW M Team RLL	BMW M Hybrid V8	(Austria) Philipp Eng	(Finland) Jesse Krohn
25	(United States) BMW M Team RLL	BMW M Hybrid V8	(United States) Connor De Phillippi	(United Kingdom) Nick Yelloly
31	(United States) Whelen Cadillac Racing	Cadillac V-Series.R	(United Kingdom) Jack Aitken	(Brazil) Pipo Derani
40	(United States) Wayne Taylor Racing with Andretti	Acura ARX-06	(Switzerland) Louis Delétraz	(United States) Jordan Taylor
85	(United States) JDC–Miller MotorSports	Porsche 963	(Netherlands) Tijmen van der Helm	(United Kingdom) Richard Westbrook
GTD (GT Daytona) (17 entries)
12	(United States) Vasser Sullivan	Lexus RC F GT3	(United Kingdom) Jack Hawksworth	(United States) Frankie Montecalvo
13	(Canada) AWA	Chevrolet Corvette Z06 GT3.R	(United Kingdom) Matt Bell	(Canada) Orey Fidani
27	(United States) Heart of Racing Team	Aston Martin Vantage AMR GT3 Evo	(Canada) Roman De Angelis	(United States) Spencer Pumpelly
28	(United States) Flying Lizard Motorsports	Aston Martin Vantage AMR GT3 Evo	(United States) Andy Lee	(United States) Elias Sabo
32	(United States) Korthoff/Preston Motorsports	Mercedes-AMG GT3 Evo	(Canada) Mikaël Grenier	(United States) Mike Skeen
34	(United States) Conquest Racing	Ferrari 296 GT3	(Spain) Albert Costa	(United States) Manny Franco
43	(United States) Andretti Motorsports	Porsche 911 GT3 R (992)	(United States) Jarett Andretti	(Colombia) Gabby Chaves
45	(United States) Wayne Taylor Racing with Andretti	Lamborghini Huracán GT3 Evo 2	(Costa Rica) Danny Formal	(Canada) Kyle Marcelli
55	(Germany) Proton Competition	Ford Mustang GT3	(Italy) Giammarco Levorato	(United States) Corey Lewis
57	(United States) Winward Racing	Mercedes-AMG GT3 Evo	(Switzerland) Philip Ellis	(United States) Russell Ward
66	(United States) Gradient Racing	Acura NSX GT3 Evo22	(United Kingdom) Stevan McAleer	(United States) Sheena Monk
70	(United Kingdom) Inception Racing	McLaren 720S GT3 Evo	(United States) Brendan Iribe	(Denmark) Frederik Schandorff
78	(United States) Forte Racing	Lamborghini Huracán GT3 Evo 2	(Canada) Misha Goikhberg	(Italy) Loris Spinelli
86	(United States) MDK Motorsports	Porsche 911 GT3 R (992)	(Denmark) Anders Fjordbach	(China) Kerong Li
89	(United States) Vasser Sullivan	Lexus RC F GT3	(United Kingdom) Ben Barnicoat	(Canada) Parker Thompson
96	(United States) Turner Motorsport	BMW M4 GT3	(United States) Robby Foley	(United States) Patrick Gallagher
120	(United States) Wright Motorsports	Porsche 911 GT3 R (992)	(United States) Adam Adelson	(United States) Elliott Skeer

== Practice ==
There were two practice sessions preceding the start of the race on Saturday, one on Friday morning and one on Friday afternoon. The first session lasted 1 hour on Friday morning while the second session on Friday afternoon lasted 90 minutes.

== Qualifying ==
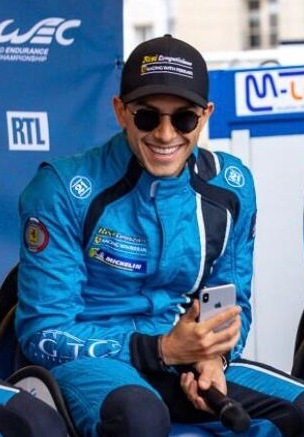
Pipo Derani (pictured in 2019) helped take the No. 31 Cadillac's third pole position of 2024.

Friday's afternoon qualifying session was broken into two sessions, with one session for the GTP and GTD classes, which lasted 15 minutes each. The rules dictated that all teams nominated a driver to qualify their cars. The competitors' fastest lap times determined the starting order. IMSA then arranged the grid to put GTPs ahead of the GTD cars.

=== Qualifying results ===
Pole positions in each class are indicated in bold and with ‡.

Pos.	Class	No.	Entry	Driver	Time	Gap	Grid
1	**GTP**	**31**	**(United States) Whelen Cadillac Racing**	**(Brazil) Pipo Derani**	**1:11.388**	—	1‡
2	GTP	25	(United States) BMW M Team RLL	(United Kingdom) Nick Yelloly	1:11.397	+0.009	2
3	GTP	01	(United States) Cadillac Racing	(France) Sébastien Bourdais	1:11.411	+0.023	3
4	GTP	6	(Germany) Porsche Penske Motorsport	(United Kingdom) Nick Tandy	1:11.629	+0.241	4
5	GTP	7	(Germany) Porsche Penske Motorsport	(United States) Dane Cameron	1:11.741	+0.353	5
6	GTP	40	(United States) Wayne Taylor Racing with Andretti	(United States) Jordan Taylor	1:11.745	+0.357	6
7	GTP	85	(United States) JDC–Miller MotorSports	(Netherlands) Tijmen van der Helm	1:11.930	+0.542	7
8	GTP	10	(United States) Wayne Taylor Racing with Andretti	(Portugal) Filipe Albuquerque	1:11.940	+0.552	8
9	GTP	24	(United States) BMW M Team RLL	(Austria) Philipp Eng	1:11.999	+0.611	9
10	GTP	5	(Germany) Proton Competition Mustang Sampling	(Germany) Mike Rockenfeller	1:13.143	+1.755	10
11	**GTD**	**89**	**(United States) Vasser Sullivan**	**(Canada) Parker Thompson**	**1:17.357**	**+5.969**	11‡
12	GTD	12	(United States) Vasser Sullivan	(United States) Frankie Montecalvo	1:17.619	+6.231	12
13	GTD	34	(United States) Conquest Racing	(Spain) Albert Costa	1:17.679	+6.291	13
14	GTD	27	(United States) Heart of Racing Team	(Canada) Roman De Angelis	1:17.725	+6.337	14
15	GTD	45	(United States) Wayne Taylor Racing with Andretti	(Costa Rica) Danny Formal	1:17.814	+6.426	15
16	GTD	32	(United States) Korthoff/Preston Motorsports	(Canada) Mikaël Grenier	1:17.827	+6.439	16
17	GTD	96	(United States) Turner Motorsport	(United States) Patrick Gallagher	1:18.011	+6.623	17
18	GTD	55	(Germany) Proton Competition	(Italy) Giammarco Levorato	1:18.177	+6.789	18
19	GTD	57	(United States) Winward Racing	(United States) Russell Ward	1:18.300	+6.912	19
20	GTD	70	(United Kingdom) Inception Racing	(United States) Brendan Iribe	1:18.448	+7.060	20
21	GTD	120	(United States) Wright Motorsports	(United States) Adam Adelson	1:18.457	+7.069	21
22	GTD	78	(United States) Forte Racing	(Canada) Misha Goikhberg	1:18.655	+7.267	22
23	GTD	43	(United States) Andretti Motorsports	(United States) Jarett Andretti	1:19.335	+7.947	23
24	GTD	86	(United States) MDK Motorsports	(China) Kerong Li	1:19.901	+8.513	24
25	GTD	13	(Canada) AWA	(Canada) Orey Fidani	1:20.072	+8.684	25
26	GTD	28	(United States) Flying Lizard Motorsports	(United States) Elias Sabo	1:20.397	+9.009	26
27	GTD	66	(United States) Gradient Racing	No Time Established			27

== Post-race ==
The final results kept Cameron and Nasr atop the GTP Drivers' Championship with 1032 points, 58 ahead of race winners Bourdais and van der Zande. The final results of GTD kept Ellis and Ward atop the Drivers' Championship with 987 points. Foley and Gallagher jumped from tenth to second with 802 points, 10 ahead of Thompson. Cadillac and Mercedes-AMG continued to top their respective Manufactures' Championships while Porsche Penske Motorsport and Winward Racing kept their respective advantages in their of Teams' Championships with eight rounds remaining.

=== Race results ===
Class winners are denoted in bold and with ‡.

Pos	Class	No	Team	Drivers	Chassis	Laps	Time/Retired
Pos	Class	No	Team	Drivers	Engine	Laps	Time/Retired
1	**GTP**	**01**	**(United States) Cadillac Racing**	**(France) Sébastien Bourdais (Netherlands) Renger van der Zande**	**Cadillac V-Series.R**	**68**	**1:40:07.318‡**
1	**GTP**	**01**	**(United States) Cadillac Racing**	**(France) Sébastien Bourdais (Netherlands) Renger van der Zande**	**Cadillac LMC55R 5.5 L V8**	**68**	**1:40:07.318‡**
2	GTP	31	(United States) Whelen Cadillac Racing	(United Kingdom) Jack Aitken (Brazil) Pipo Derani	Cadillac V-Series.R	68	+0.564
2	GTP	31	(United States) Whelen Cadillac Racing	(United Kingdom) Jack Aitken (Brazil) Pipo Derani	Cadillac LMC55R 5.5 L V8	68	+0.564
3	GTP	7	(Germany) Porsche Penske Motorsport	(United States) Dane Cameron (Brazil) Felipe Nasr	Porsche 963	68	+1.675
3	GTP	7	(Germany) Porsche Penske Motorsport	(United States) Dane Cameron (Brazil) Felipe Nasr	Porsche 9RD 4.6 L twin-turbo V8	68	+1.675
4	GTP	6	(Germany) Porsche Penske Motorsport	(France) Mathieu Jaminet (United Kingdom) Nick Tandy	Porsche 963	68	+2.913
4	GTP	6	(Germany) Porsche Penske Motorsport	(France) Mathieu Jaminet (United Kingdom) Nick Tandy	Porsche 9RD 4.6 L twin-turbo V8	68	+2.913
5	GTP	5	(Germany) Proton Competition Mustang Sampling	(Italy) Gianmaria Bruni (Germany) Mike Rockenfeller	Porsche 963	68	+4.297
5	GTP	5	(Germany) Proton Competition Mustang Sampling	(Italy) Gianmaria Bruni (Germany) Mike Rockenfeller	Porsche 9RD 4.6 L twin-turbo V8	68	+4.297
6	GTP	24	(United States) BMW M Team RLL	(Austria) Philipp Eng (Finland) Jesse Krohn	BMW M Hybrid V8	68	+5.047
6	GTP	24	(United States) BMW M Team RLL	(Austria) Philipp Eng (Finland) Jesse Krohn	BMW P66/3 4.0 L twin-turbo V8	68	+5.047
7	GTP	85	(United States) JDC-Miller MotorSports	(Netherlands) Tijmen van der Helm (United Kingdom) Richard Westbrook	Porsche 963	68	+6.892
7	GTP	85	(United States) JDC-Miller MotorSports	(Netherlands) Tijmen van der Helm (United Kingdom) Richard Westbrook	Porsche 9RD 4.6 L twin-turbo V8	68	+6.892
8	GTP	10	(United States) Wayne Taylor Racing with Andretti	(Portugal) Filipe Albuquerque (United States) Ricky Taylor	Acura ARX-06	68	+7.343
8	GTP	10	(United States) Wayne Taylor Racing with Andretti	(Portugal) Filipe Albuquerque (United States) Ricky Taylor	Acura AR24e 2.4 L twin-turbo V6	68	+7.343
9	**GTD**	**89**	**(United States) Vasser Sullivan**	**(United Kingdom) Ben Barnicoat (Canada) Parker Thompson**	**Lexus RC F GT3**	**65**	**+3 Laps‡**
9	**GTD**	**89**	**(United States) Vasser Sullivan**	**(United Kingdom) Ben Barnicoat (Canada) Parker Thompson**	**Toyota 2UR-GSE 5.0 L V8**	**65**	**+3 Laps‡**
10	GTD	96	(United States) Turner Motorsport	(United States) Robby Foley (United States) Patrick Gallagher	BMW M4 GT3	65	+3 Laps
10	GTD	96	(United States) Turner Motorsport	(United States) Robby Foley (United States) Patrick Gallagher	BMW S58B30T0 3.0 L Turbo I6	65	+3 Laps
11	GTD	32	(United States) Korthoff/Preston Motorsports	(Canada) Mikaël Grenier (United States) Mike Skeen	Mercedes-AMG GT3 Evo	65	+3 Laps
11	GTD	32	(United States) Korthoff/Preston Motorsports	(Canada) Mikaël Grenier (United States) Mike Skeen	Mercedes-AMG M159 6.2 L V8	65	+3 Laps
12	GTD	66	(United States) Gradient Racing	(United Kingdom) Stevan McAleer (United States) Sheena Monk	Acura NSX GT3 Evo22	65	+3 Laps
12	GTD	66	(United States) Gradient Racing	(United Kingdom) Stevan McAleer (United States) Sheena Monk	Acura JNC1 3.5 L Turbo V6	65	+3 Laps
13	GTD	55	(Germany) Proton Competition	(Italy) Giammarco Levorato (United States) Corey Lewis	Ford Mustang GT3	65	+3 Laps
13	GTD	55	(Germany) Proton Competition	(Italy) Giammarco Levorato (United States) Corey Lewis	Ford Coyote 5.4 L V8	65	+3 Laps
14	GTD	13	(Canada) AWA	(United Kingdom) Matt Bell (Canada) Orey Fidani	Chevrolet Corvette Z06 GT3.R	65	+3 Laps
14	GTD	13	(Canada) AWA	(United Kingdom) Matt Bell (Canada) Orey Fidani	Chevrolet LT6 5.5 L V8	65	+3 Laps
15	GTD	57	(United States) Winward Racing	(United Kingdom) Philip Ellis (United States) Russell Ward	Mercedes-AMG GT3 Evo	65	+3 Laps
15	GTD	57	(United States) Winward Racing	(United Kingdom) Philip Ellis (United States) Russell Ward	Mercedes-AMG M159 6.2 L V8	65	+3 Laps
16	GTD	45	(United States) Wayne Taylor Racing with Andretti	(Costa Rica) Danny Formal (Canada) Kyle Marcelli	Lamborghini Huracán GT3 Evo 2	65	+3 Laps
16	GTD	45	(United States) Wayne Taylor Racing with Andretti	(Costa Rica) Danny Formal (Canada) Kyle Marcelli	Lamborghini DGF 5.2 L V10	65	+3 Laps
17	GTD	43	(United States) Andretti Motorsports	(United States) Jarett Andretti (Colombia) Gabby Chaves	Porsche 911 GT3 R (992)	65	+3 Laps
17	GTD	43	(United States) Andretti Motorsports	(United States) Jarett Andretti (Colombia) Gabby Chaves	Porsche 4.2 L Flat-6	65	+3 Laps
18	GTD	28	(United States) Flying Lizard Motorsports	(United States) Elias Sabo (United States) Andy Lee	Aston Martin Vantage AMR GT3 Evo	65	+3 Laps
18	GTD	28	(United States) Flying Lizard Motorsports	(United States) Elias Sabo (United States) Andy Lee	Aston Martin M177 4.0 L Turbo V8	65	+3 Laps
19	GTD	78	(United States) Forte Racing	(Canada) Misha Goikhberg (Italy) Loris Spinelli	Lamborghini Huracán GT3 Evo 2	65	+3 Laps
19	GTD	78	(United States) Forte Racing	(Canada) Misha Goikhberg (Italy) Loris Spinelli	Lamborghini DGF 5.2 L V10	65	+3 Laps
20	GTD	34	(United States) Conquest Racing	(Spain) Albert Costa (United States) Manny Franco	Ferrari 296 GT3	65	+3 Laps
20	GTD	34	(United States) Conquest Racing	(Spain) Albert Costa (United States) Manny Franco	Ferrari F163 3.0 L Turbo V6	65	+3 Laps
21	GTD	86	(United States) MDK Motorsports	(Denmark) Anders Fjordbach (China) Kerong Li	Porsche 911 GT3 R (992)	64	+4 Laps
21	GTD	86	(United States) MDK Motorsports	(Denmark) Anders Fjordbach (China) Kerong Li	Porsche 4.2 L Flat-6	64	+4 Laps
22 DNF	GTP	25	(United States) BMW M Team RLL	(United States) Connor De Phillippi (United Kingdom) Nick Yelloly	BMW M Hybrid V8	61	Accident damage
22 DNF	GTP	25	(United States) BMW M Team RLL	(United States) Connor De Phillippi (United Kingdom) Nick Yelloly	BMW P66/3 4.0 L twin-turbo V8	61	Accident damage
23 DNF	GTD	27	(United States) Heart of Racing Team	(Canada) Roman De Angelis (United States) Spencer Pumpelly	Aston Martin Vantage AMR GT3 Evo	51	Accident damage
23 DNF	GTD	27	(United States) Heart of Racing Team	(Canada) Roman De Angelis (United States) Spencer Pumpelly	Aston Martin M177 4.0 L Turbo V8	51	Accident damage
24 DNF	GTD	12	(United States) Vasser Sullivan	(United States) Frankie Montecalvo (United Kingdom) Jack Hawksworth	Lexus RC F GT3	41	Accident damage
24 DNF	GTD	12	(United States) Vasser Sullivan	(United States) Frankie Montecalvo (United Kingdom) Jack Hawksworth	Toyota 2UR-GSE 5.0 L V8	41	Accident damage
25 DNF	GTP	40	(United States) Wayne Taylor Racing with Andretti	(Switzerland) Louis Delétraz (United States) Jordan Taylor	Acura ARX-06	30	Accident
25 DNF	GTP	40	(United States) Wayne Taylor Racing with Andretti	(Switzerland) Louis Delétraz (United States) Jordan Taylor	Acura AR24e 2.4 L twin-turbo V6	30	Accident
26 DNF	GTD	120	(United States) Wright Motorsports	(United States) Adam Adelson (United States) Elliott Skeer	Porsche 911 GT3 R (992)	8	Accident damage
26 DNF	GTD	120	(United States) Wright Motorsports	(United States) Adam Adelson (United States) Elliott Skeer	Porsche 4.2 L Flat-6	8	Accident damage
27 DNF	GTD	70	(United Kingdom) Inception Racing	(United States) Brendan Iribe (Denmark) Frederik Schandorff	McLaren 720S GT3 Evo	7	Accident
27 DNF	GTD	70	(United Kingdom) Inception Racing	(United States) Brendan Iribe (Denmark) Frederik Schandorff	McLaren M840T 4.0 L Turbo V8	7	Accident

== Standings after the race ==
GTP Drivers' Championship standings
Pos.	+/–	Driver	Points
1		(United States) Dane Cameron (Brazil) Felipe Nasr	1032
2	2	(France) Sébastien Bourdais (Netherlands) Renger van der Zande	974
3		(United Kingdom) Jack Aitken (Brazil) Pipo Derani	955
4	2	(Switzerland) Louis Delétraz (United States) Jordan Taylor	941
5	1	(France) Mathieu Jaminet (United Kingdom) Nick Tandy	853

LMP2 Drivers' Championship standings
Pos.	+/–	Driver	Points
1		(United Kingdom) Ryan Dalziel (United States) Dwight Merriman (United States) Connor Zilisch	741
2		(Australia) Josh Burdon (Brazil) Felipe Fraga (United States) Gar Robinson	614
3		(Denmark) Malthe Jakobsen	612
4		(United States) Colin Braun (United States) George Kurtz (United Kingdom) Toby Sowery	595
5		(United States) Nick Boulle (France) Tom Dillmann (Poland) Jakub Śmiechowski	590

GTD Pro Drivers' Championship standings
Pos.	+/–	Driver	Points
1		(United Kingdom) James Calado (Italy) Davide Rigon (Brazil) Daniel Serra	722
2		(United States) Bryan Sellers (United States) Madison Snow (United States) Neil Verhagen	624
3		(United Kingdom) Ben Barnicoat (United Kingdom) Jack Hawksworth (United States) Kyle Kirkwood	617
4		(Denmark) Michael Christensen (Germany) Laurin Heinrich (United Kingdom) Sebastian Priaulx	605
5		(Italy) Mirko Bortolotti (South Africa) Jordan Pepper (France) Franck Perera	596

GTD Drivers' Championship standings
Pos.	+/–	Driver	Points
1		(Switzerland) Philip Ellis (United States) Russell Ward	987
2	8	(United States) Robby Foley (United States) Patrick Gallagher	802
3	9	(Canada) Parker Thompson	792
4		(Spain) Albert Costa (United States) Manny Franco	765
5	2	(United States) Adam Adelson (United States) Elliott Skeer	740

- Note: Only the top five positions are included for all sets of standings.

GTP Teams' Championship standings
Pos.	+/–	Team	Points
1		#7 Porsche Penske Motorsport	1032
2	2	#01 Cadillac Racing	974
3		#31 Whelen Cadillac Racing	955
4	2	#40 Wayne Taylor Racing with Andretti	941
5	1	#6 Porsche Penske Motorsport	853

LMP2 Teams' Championship standings
Pos.	+/–	Team	Points
1		#18 Era Motorsport	741
2		#74 Riley	614
3		#04 CrowdStrike Racing by APR	595
4		#52 Inter Europol by PR1/Mathiasen Motorsports	590
5		#22 United Autosports USA	558

GTD Pro Teams' Championship standings
Pos.	+/–	Team	Points
1		#62 Risi Competizione	722
2		#1 Paul Miller Racing	624
3		#14 Vasser Sullivan	617
4		#77 AO Racing	605
5		#19 Iron Lynx	596

GTD Teams' Championship standings
Pos.	+/–	Team	Points
1		#57 Winward Racing	987
2	8	#96 Turner Motorsport	802
3	1	#34 Conquest Racing	765
4	1	#120 Wright Motorsports	740
5	8	#32 Korthoff/Preston Motorsports	728

- Note: Only the top five positions are included for all sets of standings.

GTP Manufacturers' Championship standings
Pos.	+/–	Manufacturer	Points
1		(United States) Cadillac	1095
2		(Germany) Porsche	1060
3		(Japan) Acura	1018
4		(Germany) BMW	952
5		(Italy) Lamborghini	286

GTD Pro Manufacturers' Championship standings
Pos.	+/–	Manufacturer	Points
1		(Japan) Lexus	637
2		(Germany) Porsche	625
3		(Italy) Lamborghini	596
4		(United Kingdom) Aston Martin	594
5		(United States) Ford	547

GTD Manufacturers' Championship standings
Pos.	+/–	Manufacturer	Points
1		(Germany) Mercedes-AMG	1077
2	3	(Japan) Lexus	912
3	1	(Germany) Porsche	886
4	1	(Italy) Lamborghini	884
5	2	(United States) Chevrolet	776

- Note: Only the top five positions are included for all sets of standings.

IMSA SportsCar Championship
Previous race: 12 Hours of Sebring	2024 season	Next race: Motul Course de Monterey
