= Acura ARX-06 =

Sports prototype racing car built by Acura

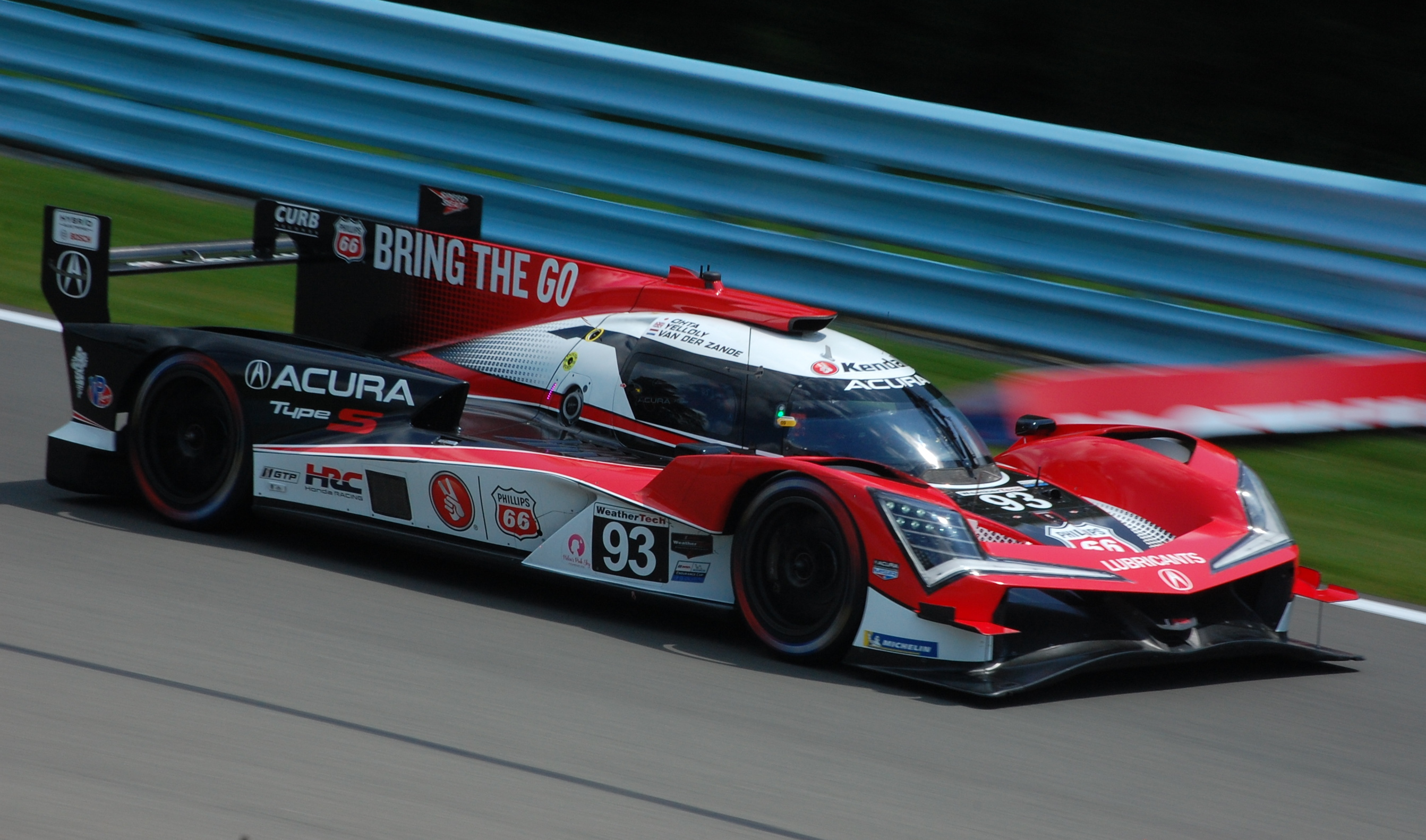
- The No. 93 ARX-06 at the 2025 Sahlen's Six Hours of The Glen
- Category: Le Mans Daytona h
- Constructor: HRC US (Oreca)
- Designers: David Salters (Technical Director, HRC US); Mark Crawford (Large Project Leader); Guy Melville-Brown (Exterior Project Lead); Bill Yex (Special Projects Lead); Jonathan Seaman (Lead Aerodynamicist)
- Predecessor: Acura ARX-05

Technical specifications
- Chassis: LMP2-based carbon fibre monocoque
- Suspension (front): Double wishbones, pushrods with power steering
- Suspension (rear): Double wishbones, pushrods
- Length: 5,100 mm (200.8 in)
- Width: 2,000 mm (78.7 in)
- Height: 1,060 mm (41.7 in)
- Wheelbase: 3,148 mm (123.9 in)
- Engine: Acura AR24e 2.4 L (146.5 cu in) 90° V6 twin-turbocharged, 24valve, DOHC mid-engine, longitudinally-mounted
- Electric motor: Rear-mounted 50 kW (68 PS; 67 hp) spec MGU supplied by Bosch
- Transmission: Xtrac P1359 7-speed sequential manual
- Power: 500 kW (680 PS; 671 hp)
- Weight: 1,030 kg
- Fuel: VP Racing Fuels
- Lubricants: Phillips 66
- Brakes: AP Racing carbon with AP Racing Monobloc 6-piston calipers
- Tyres: Michelin slicks with Rotiform one-piece forged alloys

Competition history
- Competition: IMSA SportsCar Championship
- Notable entrants: (United States) Meyer Shank Racing; (United States) Wayne Taylor Racing
- Notable drivers: (Portugal) Filipe Albuquerque; (United States) Ricky Taylor; (Switzerland) Louis Delétraz; (New Zealand) Brendon Hartley; (United Kingdom) Tom Blomqvist; (United States) Colin Braun; (Brazil) Hélio Castroneves; (France) Simon Pagenaud
- Debut: 2023 24 Hours of Daytona
- First win: 2023 24 Hours of Daytona
- Last win: 2026 Grand Prix of Long Beach
- Last event: 2026 Petit Le Mans
Races	Wins	Podiums	Poles	F/Laps
23	7	11	5	2
- Teams' Championships: 0
- Constructors' Championships: 0
- Drivers' Championships: 0

The Acura ARX-06 is a sports prototype racing car designed by Honda Racing Corporation USA, formerly known as Honda Performance Development (HPD), and built by Oreca. It is designed to the Le Mans Daytona h regulations, and competes in the GTP class in the IMSA SportsCar Championship since 2023. The car has a bespoke 2.4-liter twin-turbocharged V6 engine designated as the AR24e. The ARX-06 debuted alongside the BMW M Hybrid V8, Cadillac V-LMDh and Porsche 963 at the 2023 season opener of the IMSA SportsCar Championship at the Daytona International Speedway.

The ARX-06 won the 24 Hours of Daytona in 2023, the 12 Hours of Sebring in 2024 and Petit Le Mans in 2023, becoming the first car to win all three major IMSA endurance races during the GTP era.

== Background ==
In January 2021, Acura formally announced they would participate in IMSA's new GTP class in 2023 using an LMDh-compliant racing design. On December 6, 2021, Acura announced it would work with Oreca as their chassis supplier, making Acura the first manufacturer in the LMDh ruleset to select Oreca as their partner. It was also confirmed on the same day that Meyer Shank Racing and Wayne Taylor Racing would campaign the ARX-06 in the 2023 IMSA SportsCar Championship season.

The ARX-06 completed its first shakedown at Circuit Paul Ricard in July 2022. It was followed by the car's first full test at Circuit de Nevers Magny-Cours on 16 & 17 July 2022. The car was revealed on August 17, 2022. It was also announced that the car would use a hybrid powertrain, consisting of a 90° twin-turbocharged V6 internal combustion engine and standardized hybrid drivetrain components provided by Williams Advanced Engineering, Bosch and Xtrac, for maximum possible combined output of 671 hp (500 KW). No 24 hour tests were conducted due to supply-chain issues.

== Competition history ==
=== 2023 ===
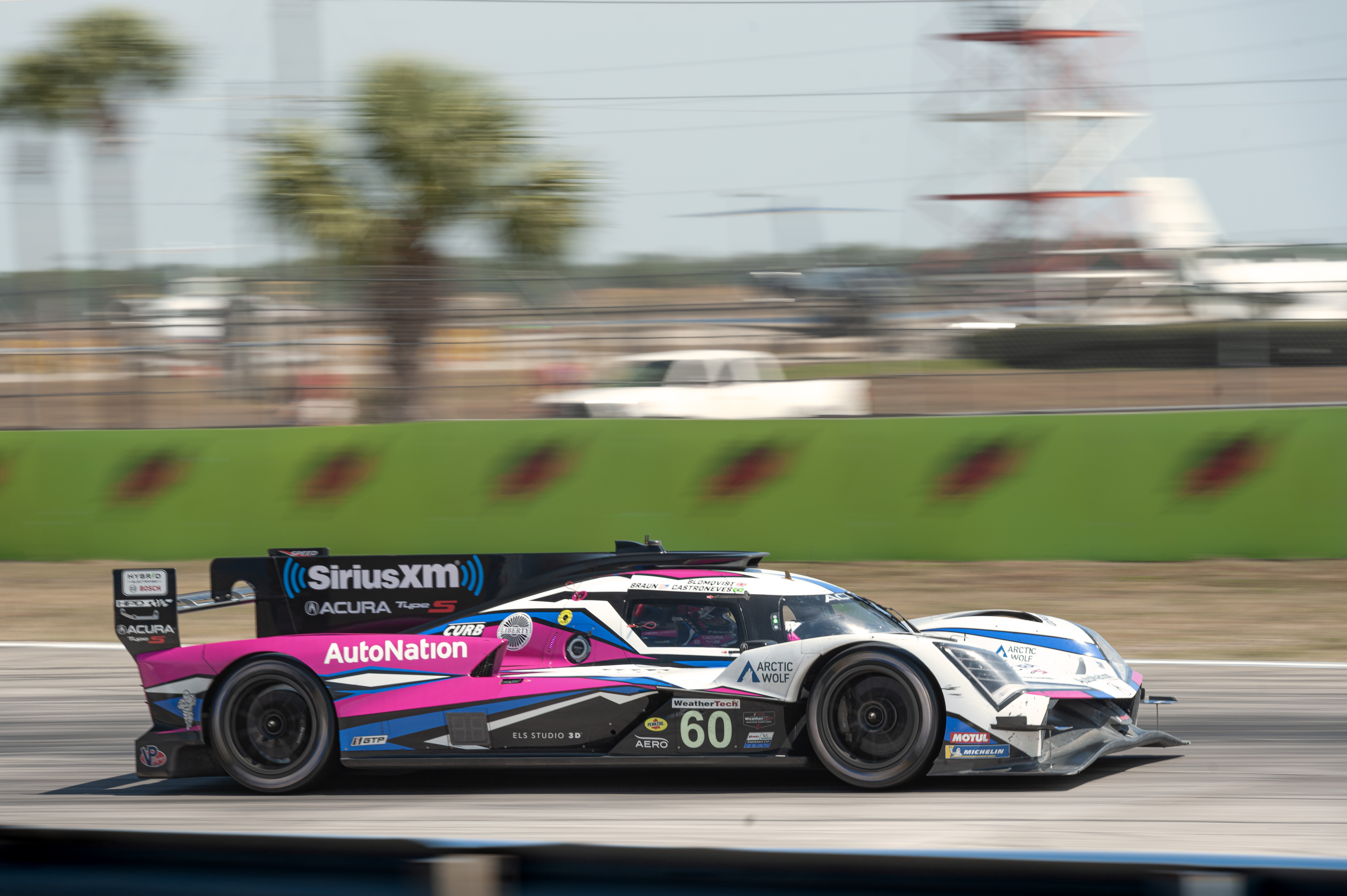
Meyer Shank Racing's No. 60 ARX-06 at the 2023 12 Hours of Sebring.

Two ARX-06s would campaign the 2023 IMSA SportsCar Championship. Wayne Taylor Racing and Meyer Shank Racing returned to compete with Acura after both teams had been competing in the series with Acura's ARX-05 since 2021. Wayne Taylor Racing, entering a partnership with Andretti Global for 2023, continued to race as #10, retaining Filipe Albuquerque and Ricky Taylor for the full season, and Meyer Shank Racing carried over #60, with longtime IMSA driver Colin Braun joining a returning Tom Blomqvist.

The ARX-06 proved to be the fastest car on debut against its fellow GTP class debutants, as both cars would qualify in the top 3, and later take home 1st and 2nd and the fastest lap at the 2023 24 Hours of Daytona, with Meyer Shank Racing's Braun and Blomqvist, joined by Hélio Castroneves and Simon Pagenaud, scoring the victory. After the race, Meyer Shank Racing were awarded a 200-point penalty following a post-race investigation by IMSA that revealed the team had manipulated tire pressure data in order to gain an advantage. They were, however, allowed to keep their race victory, which created controversy amongst drivers and spectators.

Both teams would score a collective total of six podiums throughout the season, including two more wins and a pole position at the 2023 Chevrolet Grand Prix and the 2023 Petit Le Mans, however, they would ultimately lose out in the Drivers' and Teams' Championships to Action Express Racing and Cadillac, who had each secured the titles at the finale in Road Atlanta amidst another controversial finish, as Albuquerque and Pipo Derani collided in Turn 1 in the final hour, forcing Albuquerque and Wayne Taylor Racing to retire. Acura would finish 3rd in the Manufacturers' Standings. At the end of the season, Meyer Shank Racing left the series to focus on an expanded effort in the 2024 IndyCar Series.

=== 2024 ===
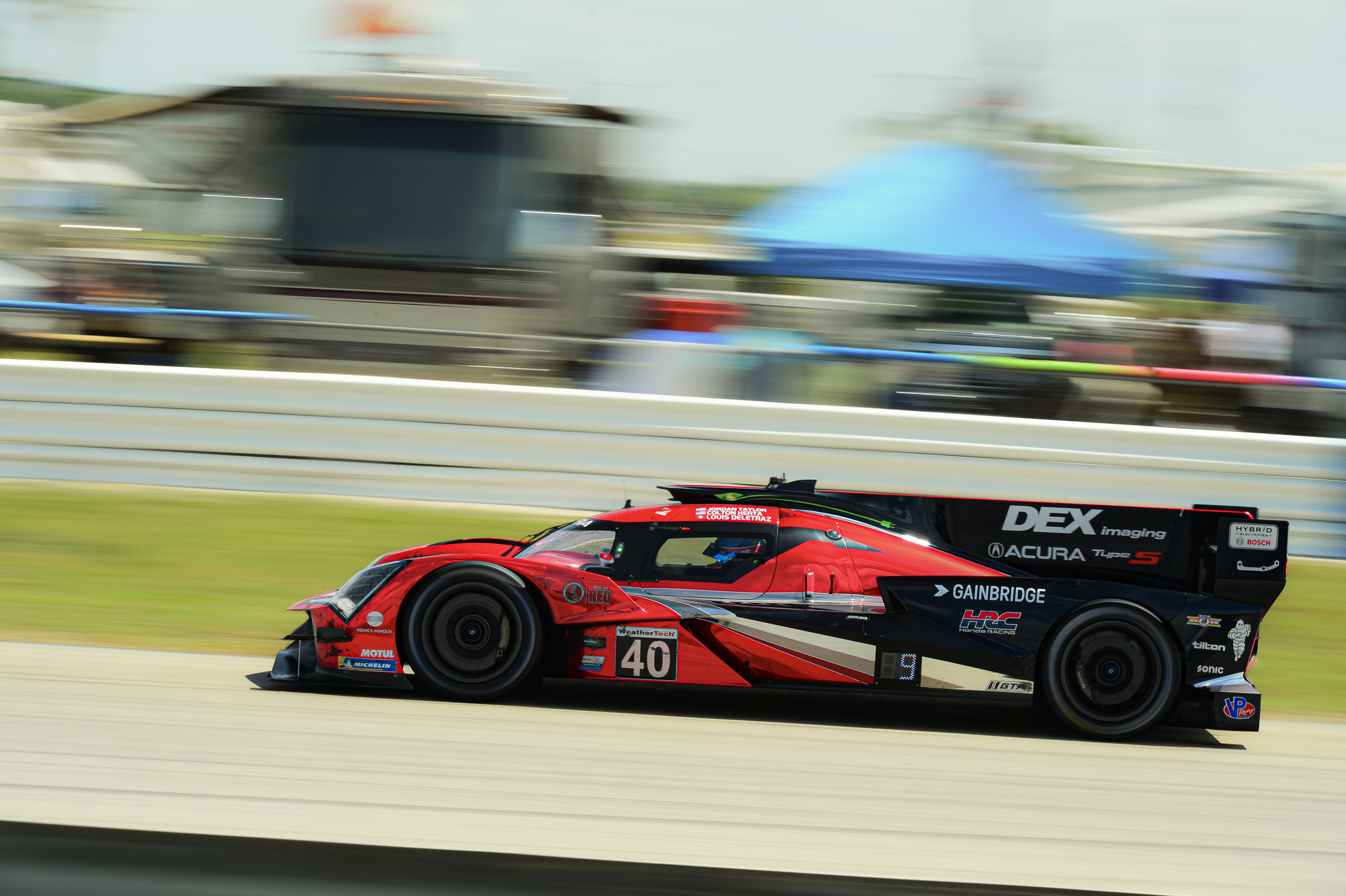
WTR/Andretti's No. 40 ARX-06 at the 2024 12 Hours of Sebring.

With Meyer Shank Racing's exit, Wayne Taylor Racing took over management of both cars, retaining Filipe Albuquerque and Ricky Taylor to drive the #10 car, and taking on Jordan Taylor and Louis Delétraz to race in the new #40 car.

Acura would fall behind on pace from the front as Porsche and Cadillac regularly fought in the top 5 and BMW would be in the mix. Wayne Taylor Racing would earn their first victory with the ARX-06 in the 2024 12 Hours of Sebring, as Delétraz completed a late-race pass for the lead on Porsche's Felipe Nasr and holding off Cadillac's Sébastien Bourdais to take home the win and the fastest lap alongside Jordan Taylor and Colton Herta, the latter joining the team for Sebring. The #10 crew would earn the team's second victory at the 2024 Chevrolet Detroit Sports Car Classic, with Albuquerque taking advantage of a late drive-through penalty from Porsche's Nick Tandy. Wayne Taylor Racing would score a total of four podiums and two race wins with the ARX-06, and would finish 5th and 6th in the Drivers' Standings. Acura would once again finish 3rd in the Manufacturers' Standings.

=== 2025 ===
For 2025, Wayne Taylor Racing would confirm a move to Cadillac, replacing Chip Ganassi Racing, and Meyer Shank Racing would return to the programme, confirming to a two-car lineup for the season, with one of the entries managed by Honda Racing Corporation USA. Blomqvist and Braun were retained for the full season to drive the returning #60 car, and Nick Yelloly and Renger van der Zande would join from BMW and Cadillac respectively to form the full season lineup for the new #93 car. IndyCar champions Álex Palou and Scott Dixon would join the team for the Michelin Endurance Cup rounds.

=== 2026 ===
The 2026 season saw an unchanged driver lineup for Meyer Shank Racing and strong initial success, with the #93 car winning the Grand Prix of Long Beach and regularly finishing well in both qualifying and races. However, midway through the season Honda Racing Corporation announced that the ARX-06 program would be suspended after the end of the season. Honda ruled out sales of the car to customer teams and Meyer Shank also announced they would take a hiatus from IMSA; both organizations cited a desire to focus on their IndyCar Series activities. In their last race, the 2026 Petit Le Mans, the #93 ran a special tribute paint scheme celebrating Acura's history in IMSA prototypes and fans were invited to sign their names or write messages on both cars. The #60 and #93 cars qualified 1-2 respectively and both cars led the field for much of the opening third of the race; however, the #93 would retire with about three hours left and the #60 would finish in sixth place following several incidents including a collision between the teammates while battling for position.

== Racing results ==
=== Complete IMSA SportsCar Championship results ===
(key) Races in bold indicates pole position. Races in italics indicates fastest lap. Year with * indicates in progress.

Year	Entrants	Class	Drivers	No.	1	2	3	4	5	6	7	8	9	Pts.	Pos.
2023					DAY	SEB	LBH	MON	WGL	MOS	ELK	IMS	PET		
2023	Meyer Shank Racing with Curb-Agajanian	GTP	(United Kingdom) Tom Blomqvist	60	**1**	6	6	6	3	**1**	2	5	1	2711	3rd
2023	Meyer Shank Racing with Curb-Agajanian	GTP	(United States) Colin Braun	60	**1**	6	6	6	3	**1**	2	5	1	2711	3rd
2023	Meyer Shank Racing with Curb-Agajanian	GTP	(Brazil) Hélio Castroneves	60	**1**	6							1	2711	3rd
2023	Meyer Shank Racing with Curb-Agajanian	GTP	(France) Simon Pagenaud	60	**1**									2711	3rd
2023	Wayne Taylor Racing with Andretti Autosport	GTP	(United States) Ricky Taylor	10	2	Ret	**Ret**	4	Ret	2	3	6	**Ret**	2712	2nd
2023	Wayne Taylor Racing with Andretti Autosport	GTP	(Portugal) Filipe Albuquerque	10	2	Ret	**Ret**	4	Ret	2	3	6	**Ret**	2712	2nd
2023	Wayne Taylor Racing with Andretti Autosport	GTP	(Switzerland) Louis Delétraz	10	2	Ret			Ret				**Ret**	2712	2nd
2023	Wayne Taylor Racing with Andretti Autosport	GTP	(New Zealand) Brendon Hartley	10	2									2712	2nd
2024					DAY	SEB	LBH	LGA	DET	WGL	ELK	IMS	ATL		
2024	Wayne Taylor Racing with Andretti	GTP	(Portugal) Filipe Albuquerque	10	Ret	5	8	6	1	Ret	**3**	4	Ret	2550	6th
2024	Wayne Taylor Racing with Andretti	GTP	(United States) Ricky Taylor	10	Ret	5	8	6	1	Ret	**3**	4	Ret	2550	6th
2024	Wayne Taylor Racing with Andretti	GTP	(New Zealand) Brendon Hartley	10	Ret	5							Ret	2550	6th
2024	Wayne Taylor Racing with Andretti	GTP	(Sweden) Marcus Ericsson	10	Ret									2550	6th
2024	Wayne Taylor Racing with Andretti	GTP	(United States) Jordan Taylor	40	3	1	Ret	4	5	**4**	8	DSQ	7	2603	5th
2024	Wayne Taylor Racing with Andretti	GTP	(Switzerland) Louis Delétraz	40	3	1	Ret	4	5	**4**	8	DSQ	7	2603	5th
2024	Wayne Taylor Racing with Andretti	GTP	(United States) Colton Herta	40	3	1							7	2603	5th
2024	Wayne Taylor Racing with Andretti	GTP	(United Kingdom) Jenson Button	40	3									2603	5th
2025					DAY	SEB	LBH	LGA	DET	WGL	ELK	IMS	ATL		
2025	Acura Meyer Shank Racing with Curb-Agajanian	GTP	(United Kingdom) Tom Blomqvist	60	2	10	9	11	6	1	7	3	5	2602	7th
2025	Acura Meyer Shank Racing with Curb-Agajanian	GTP	(United States) Colin Braun	60	2	10	9	11	6	1	7	3	5	2602	7th
2025	Acura Meyer Shank Racing with Curb-Agajanian	GTP	(New Zealand) Scott Dixon	60	2	10							5	2602	7th
2025	Acura Meyer Shank Racing with Curb-Agajanian	GTP	(Sweden) Felix Rosenqvist	60	2									2602	7th
2025	Acura Meyer Shank Racing with Curb-Agajanian	GTP	(Japan) Kakunoshin Ohta	93	14					6		5		2657	5th
2025	Acura Meyer Shank Racing with Curb-Agajanian	GTP	(Spain) Álex Palou	93	14	3								2657	5th
2025	Acura Meyer Shank Racing with Curb-Agajanian	GTP	(Netherlands) Renger van der Zande	93	14	3	11	5	1	6	**3**	5	7	2657	5th
2025	Acura Meyer Shank Racing with Curb-Agajanian	GTP	(United Kingdom) Nick Yelloly	93	14	3	11	5	1	6	**3**	5	7	2657	5th
2025	Acura Meyer Shank Racing with Curb-Agajanian	GTP	(France) Tristan Vautier	93									7	2657	5th
2026					DAY	SEB	LBH	LGA	DET	WGL	ELK	IMS	ATL		
2026	Acura Meyer Shank Racing with Curb-Agajanian	GTP	(United Kingdom) Tom Blomqvist	60	9	4	7	4	7	Ret	Ret	5	6	2465	8th
2026	Acura Meyer Shank Racing with Curb-Agajanian	GTP	(United States) Colin Braun	60	9	4	7	4	7	Ret	Ret	5	6	2465	8th
2026	Acura Meyer Shank Racing with Curb-Agajanian	GTP	(New Zealand) Scott Dixon	60	9	4							6	2465	8th
2026	Acura Meyer Shank Racing with Curb-Agajanian	GTP	(United States) AJ Allmendinger	60	9									2465	8th
2026	Acura Meyer Shank Racing with Curb-Agajanian	GTP	(Japan) Kakunoshin Ohta	93	**5**					2				2723	2nd
2026	Acura Meyer Shank Racing with Curb-Agajanian	GTP	(Spain) Álex Palou	93	**5**	6							Ret	2723	2nd
2026	Acura Meyer Shank Racing with Curb-Agajanian	GTP	(Netherlands) Renger van der Zande	93	**5**	6	**1**	5	4	2	**4**	7	Ret	2723	2nd
2026	Acura Meyer Shank Racing with Curb-Agajanian	GTP	(United Kingdom) Nick Yelloly	93	**5**	6	**1**	5	4	2	**4**	7	Ret	2723	2nd

=== Complete IMSA Michelin Endurance Cup results ===
(key) Races in bold indicates pole position. Races in italics indicates fastest lap. Year with * indicates in progress.

Year	Entrants	Class	Drivers	No.	1	2	3	4	5	Pts.	Pos.
2023					DAY	SEB	WGL	PET			
2023	Wayne Taylor Racing with Andretti Autosport	GTP	(United States) Ricky Taylor	10	2	Ret	Ret	**Ret**		21	8th
2023	Wayne Taylor Racing with Andretti Autosport	GTP	(Portugal) Filipe Albuquerque	10	2	Ret	Ret	**Ret**		21	8th
2023	Wayne Taylor Racing with Andretti Autosport	GTP	(Switzerland) Louis Delétraz	10	2	Ret	Ret	**Ret**		21	8th
2023	Wayne Taylor Racing with Andretti Autosport	GTP	(New Zealand) Brendon Hartley	10	2					21	8th
2023	Meyer Shank Racing with Curb-Agajanian	GTP	(United Kingdom) Tom Blomqvist	60	**1**	6	3	1		34	3rd
2023	Meyer Shank Racing with Curb-Agajanian	GTP	(United States) Colin Braun	60	**1**	6	3	1		34	3rd
2023	Meyer Shank Racing with Curb-Agajanian	GTP	(Brazil) Hélio Castroneves	60	**1**	6		1		34	3rd
2023	Meyer Shank Racing with Curb-Agajanian	GTP	(France) Simon Pagenaud	60	**1**					34	3rd
2024					DAY	SEB	WGL	IMS	ATL		
2024	Wayne Taylor Racing with Andretti	GTP	(Portugal) Filipe Albuquerque	10	Ret	5	Ret	4	9	32	7th
2024	Wayne Taylor Racing with Andretti	GTP	(United States) Ricky Taylor	10	Ret	5	Ret	4	9	32	7th
2024	Wayne Taylor Racing with Andretti	GTP	(New Zealand) Brendon Hartley	10	Ret	5			9	32	7th
2024	Wayne Taylor Racing with Andretti	GTP	(Sweden) Marcus Ericsson	10	Ret					32	7th
2024	Wayne Taylor Racing with Andretti	GTP	(United States) Jordan Taylor	40	3	1	**4**	DSQ	7	34	6th
2024	Wayne Taylor Racing with Andretti	GTP	(Switzerland) Louis Delétraz	40	3	1	**4**	DSQ	7	34	6th
2024	Wayne Taylor Racing with Andretti	GTP	(United States) Colton Herta	40	3	1			7	34	6th
2024	Wayne Taylor Racing with Andretti	GTP	(United Kingdom) Jenson Button	40	3					34	6th
2025					DAY	SEB	WGL	IMS	ATL		
2025	Acura Meyer Shank Racing with Curb-Agajanian	GTP	(United Kingdom) Tom Blomqvist	60	2	10	1	3	5	44	4th
2025	Acura Meyer Shank Racing with Curb-Agajanian	GTP	(United States) Colin Braun	60	2	10	1	3	5	44	4th
2025	Acura Meyer Shank Racing with Curb-Agajanian	GTP	(New Zealand) Scott Dixon	60	2	10			5	44	4th
2025	Acura Meyer Shank Racing with Curb-Agajanian	GTP	(Sweden) Felix Rosenqvist	60	2					44	4th
2025	Acura Meyer Shank Racing with Curb-Agajanian	GTP	(Japan) Kakunoshin Ohta	93	14		6	5		33	5th
2025	Acura Meyer Shank Racing with Curb-Agajanian	GTP	(Spain) Álex Palou	93	14	3				33	5th
2025	Acura Meyer Shank Racing with Curb-Agajanian	GTP	(Netherlands) Renger van der Zande	93	14	3	6	5	7	33	5th
2025	Acura Meyer Shank Racing with Curb-Agajanian	GTP	(United Kingdom) Nick Yelloly	93	14	3	6	5	7	33	5th
2025	Acura Meyer Shank Racing with Curb-Agajanian	GTP	(France) Tristan Vautier	93					7	33	5th
2026					DAY	SEB	WGL	ELK	ATL		
2026	Acura Meyer Shank Racing with Curb-Agajanian	GTP	(United Kingdom) Tom Blomqvist	60	9	4	Ret	Ret	6	31	9th
2026	Acura Meyer Shank Racing with Curb-Agajanian	GTP	(United States) Colin Braun	60	9	4	Ret	Ret	6	31	9th
2026	Acura Meyer Shank Racing with Curb-Agajanian	GTP	(New Zealand) Scott Dixon	60	9	4			6	31	9th
2026	Acura Meyer Shank Racing with Curb-Agajanian	GTP	(United States) AJ Allmendinger	60	9					31	9th
2026	Acura Meyer Shank Racing with Curb-Agajanian	GTP	(Japan) Kakunoshin Ohta	93	**5**		2			34	5th
2026	Acura Meyer Shank Racing with Curb-Agajanian	GTP	(Spain) Álex Palou	93	**5**	6			Ret	34	5th
2026	Acura Meyer Shank Racing with Curb-Agajanian	GTP	(Netherlands) Renger van der Zande	93	**5**	6	2	**4**	Ret	34	5th
2026	Acura Meyer Shank Racing with Curb-Agajanian	GTP	(United Kingdom) Nick Yelloly	93	**5**	6	2	**4**	Ret	34	5th
