= Acura AR24e engine =

Overview
- Manufacturer: Honda Racing Corporation USA
- Production: 2023–present

Layout
- Configuration: 90° V6
- Displacement: 2.4 L (2,396 cc)
- Cylinder bore: 89 mm (3.5 in)
- Piston stroke: 64.2 mm (3 in)
- Cylinder block material: Aluminium alloy
- Cylinder head material: Aluminium alloy
- Valvetrain: 24-valve (four-valves per cylinder), DOHC

RPM range
- Max. engine speed: 10,000

Combustion
- Turbocharger: Twin-turbocharged
- Fuel system: Gasoline direct injection
- Management: Bosch ECU
- Fuel type: VP Racing Fuels
- Oil system: Dry sump

Output
- Power output: 500 kW (671 hp; 680 PS)

The Acura AR24e engine is a twin-turbocharged, four-stroke, 2.4-liter, V6 racing engine, made by Honda Racing Corporation USA (HRC US) for use in their Acura ARX-06 LMDh race car, since 2023.

== Design ==
Honda Performance Development, now Honda Racing Corporation USA, developed the bespoke engine for the new-for-2023 ARX-06 LMDh featuring the smallest displacement that HRC US has made for an endurance racing engine. Optimizations include the 90° V-angle, to reduce the center of gravity of the engine and the combustion chamber can use sustainable low-carbon fuel. In accordance with the LMDh rules, the AR24e internal combustion engine is connected to the standardized hybrid drivetrain components provided by Bosch (motor generator unit), Williams Advanced Engineering (battery pack), and an Xtrac P1359 gearbox.

== Applications ==
- Acura ARX-06
