= 2024 IMSA SportsCar Championship =

Motor racing championship

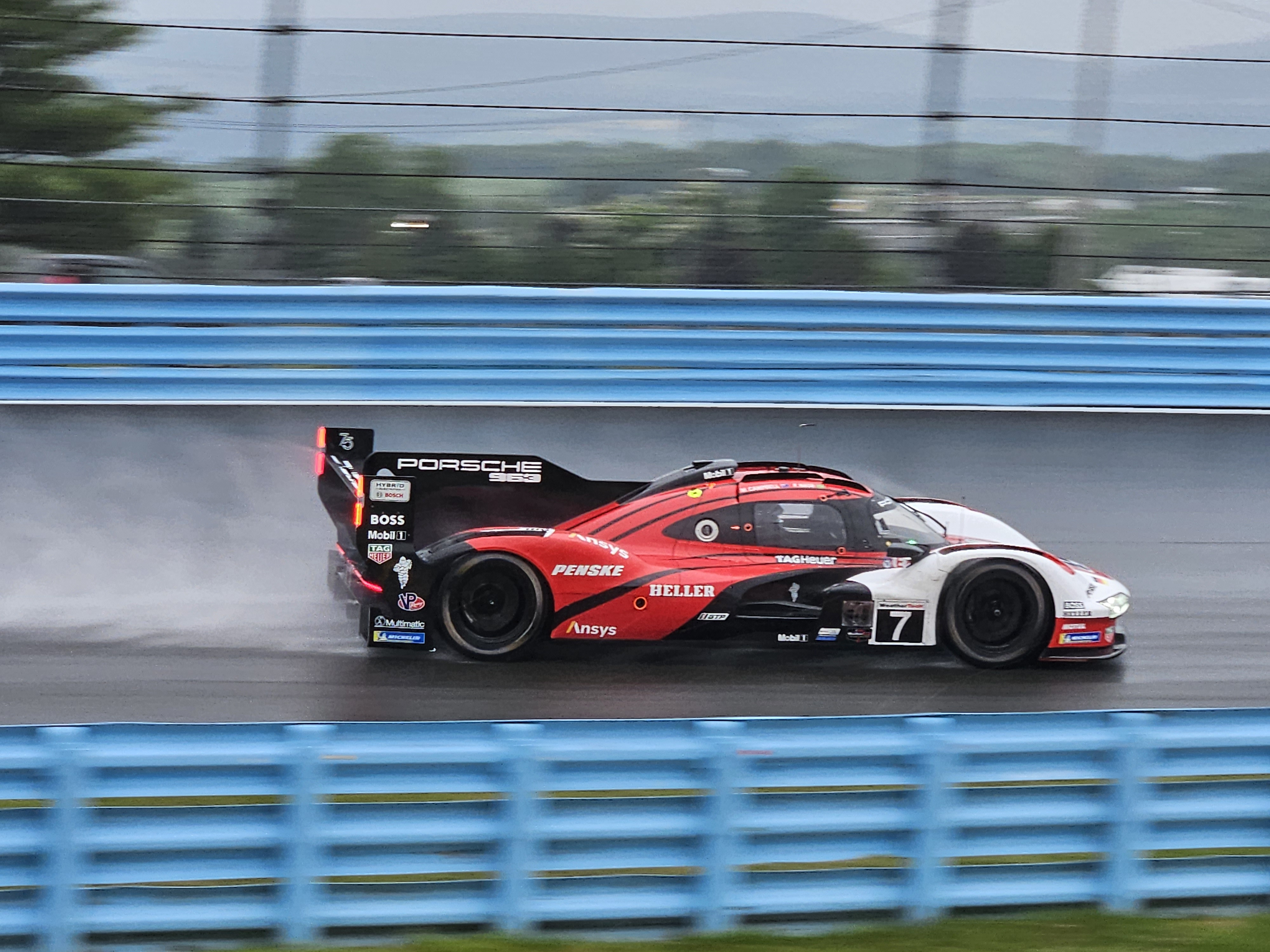
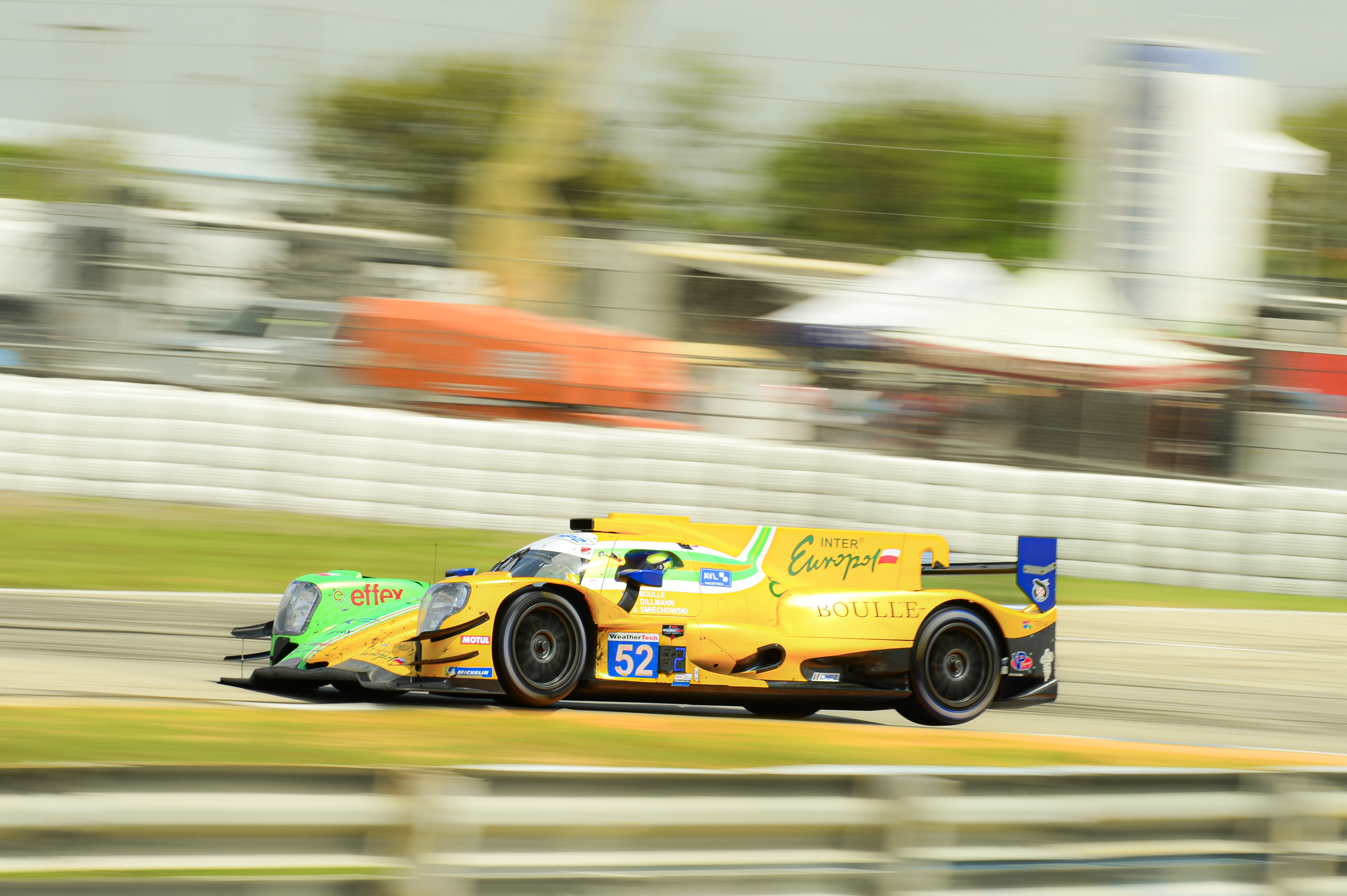
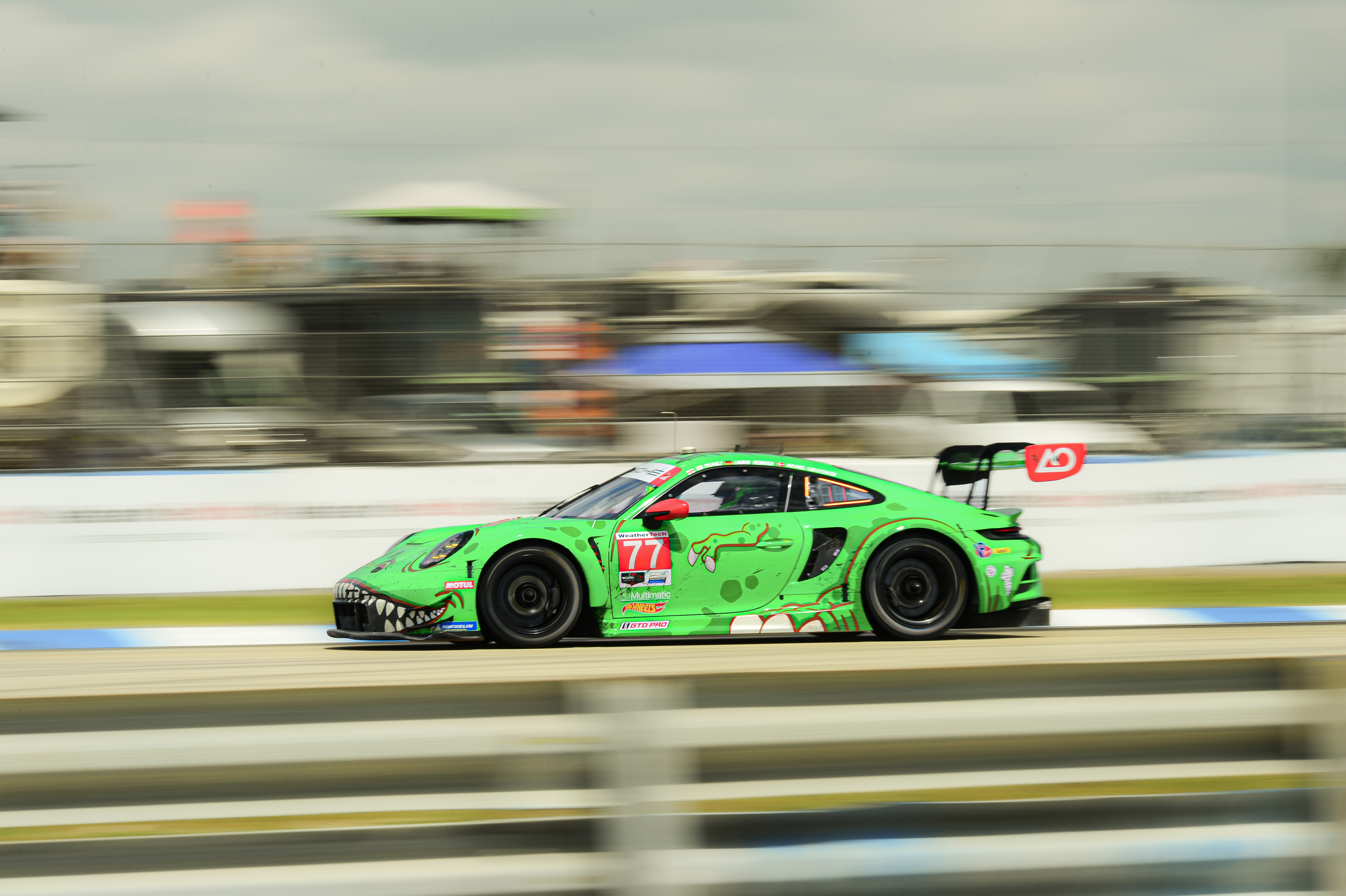
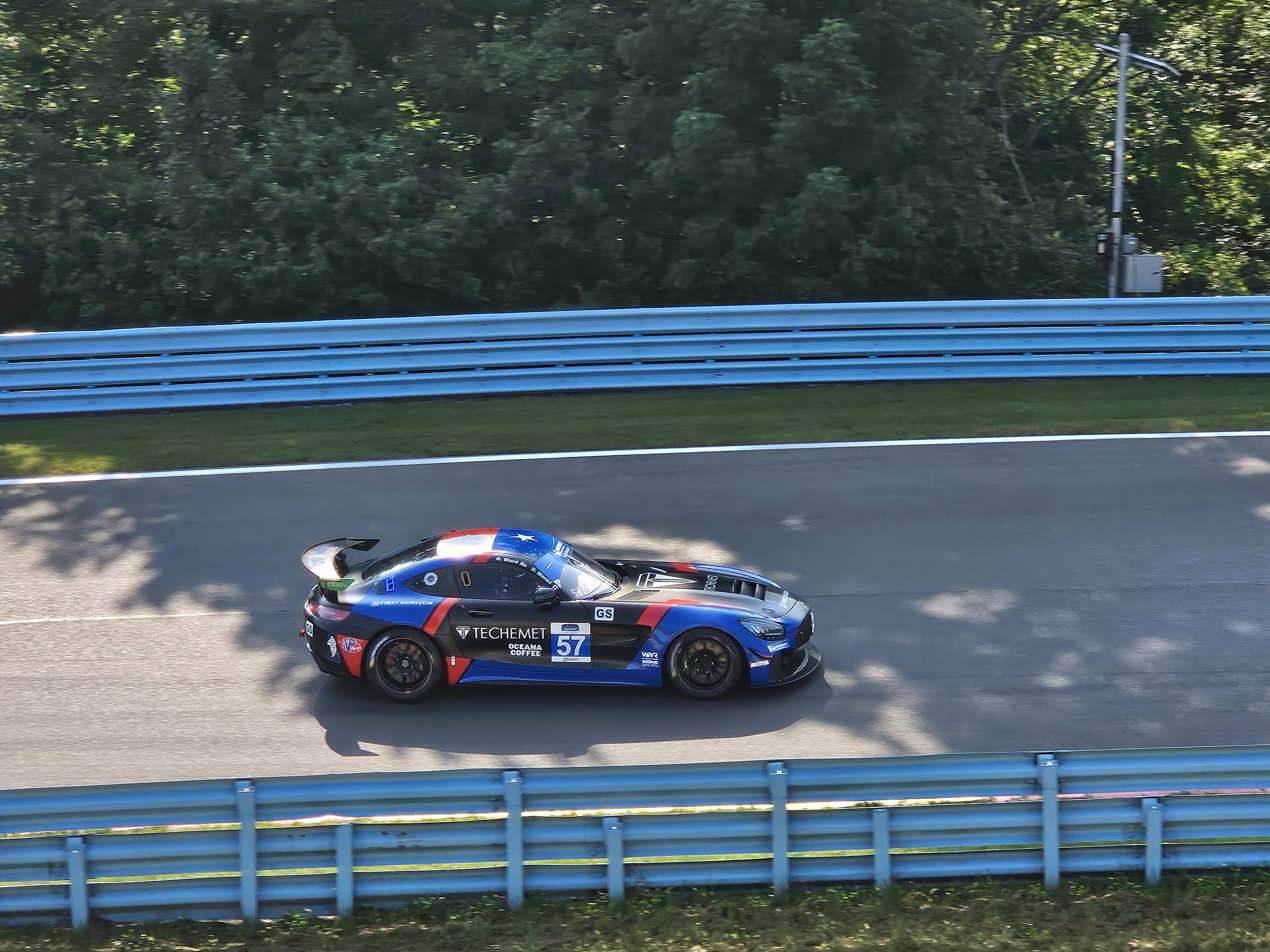
The Porsche No. 7 drivers of Team Penske are winners of the Grand Touring Prototype' Championship. Porsche won the manufacturers' championship in both GTP and GTD Pro. The Oreca No. 52 drivers of Inter Europol are the winners of the Le Mans Prototype 2 championship. The No. 77 of AO Racing Porsche won the GT Daytona Pro championship. The No. 57 Winward Racing Mercedes-AMG won the GT Daytona championship, with Mercedes-AMG winning the manufactures' championship in that class.

The 2024 IMSA SportsCar Championship (known for sponsorship reasons as the 2024 IMSA WeatherTech SportsCar Championship) was a motor racing championship, which was the 54th racing season sanctioned by the International Motor Sports Association and traces its lineage back to the 1971 IMSA GT Championship. It was also the eleventh season of the IMSA SportsCar Championship since the merger between the American Le Mans Series and the Rolex Sports Car Series in 2014, and the ninth under the sponsorship of WeatherTech. Following a change in class structure for the 2024 season, the IMSA SportsCar Championship saw a major expansion of its full-time grid across all of its classes.

== Classes ==
- Grand Touring Prototype (GTP) (LMDh and LMH)
- Le Mans Prototype 2 (LMP2)
- GT Daytona Pro (GTD Pro)
- GT Daytona (GTD)

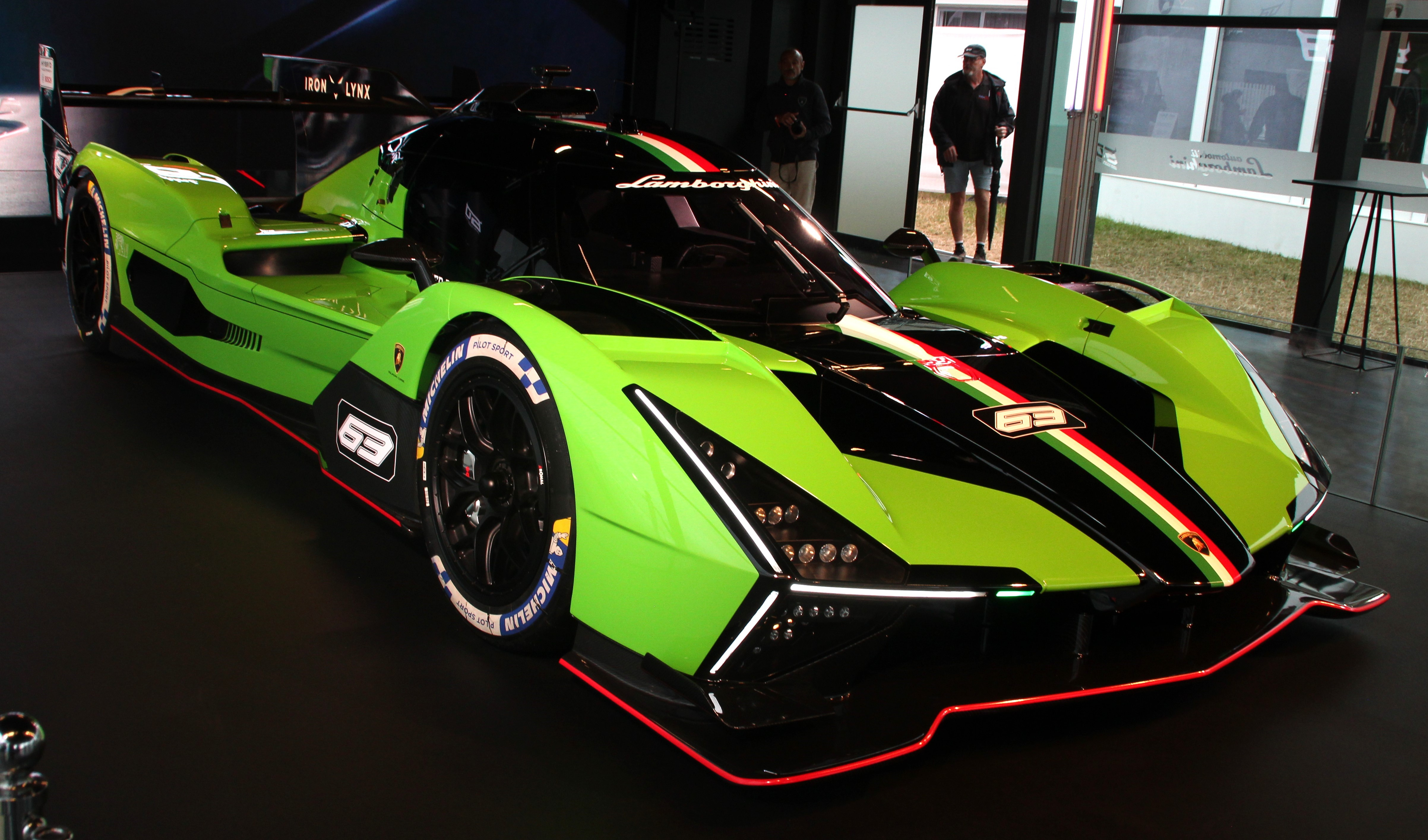
Lamborghini made their debut in the top class of the championship with the Lamborghini SC63 (pictured on display at the 2023 Goodwood Festival of Speed).

At the end of the 2023 season, IMSA discontinued the involvement of the Le Mans Prototype 3 (LMP3) class from the main championship. The class was originally introduced in 2021 as a means of bolstering the overall grid size, which had seen a record-low 38 starting cars in the 2020 24 Hours of Daytona. IMSA cited the growth of the GTP class as a contributing factor to dropping LMP3 for 2024 onwards, in addition to growth in other classes.

GTP is the flagship class of the championship, and consists of two sister technical regulations: Le Mans Daytona h (LMDh), and Le Mans Hypercar (LMH). The former regulation allows developing a bespoke design from a base chassis with a specification hybrid system on all cars, with freedom on aerodynamics and engine configuration. The latter regulation allows bespoke hybrid designs, and offers more design freedom in exchange for elevated development costs.

The GTP class is made of the same framework that comprises the Hypercar class of the FIA World Endurance Championship, in accordance with the collaborative alliance between IMSA and the French racing organizers ACO, which resulted in the convergence of the two organizer's top class regulations.

Unlike the other classes, LMP2 remained without BoP, even though there were two separate chassis in the class for the first time since 2021.

== Schedule ==
The provisional schedule was released on August 4, 2023, and featured 11 rounds.

Race is part of the Michelin Endurance Cup

Rnd.	Race	Length	Classes	Circuit	Location	Date
1	Rolex 24 at Daytona	24 hours	All	Daytona International Speedway	Daytona Beach, Florida	January 27–28
2	Mobil 1 Twelve Hours of Sebring	12 hours	All	Sebring International Raceway	Sebring, Florida	March 16
3	Acura Grand Prix of Long Beach	1 hour, 40 minutes	GTP, GTD	Long Beach Street Circuit	Long Beach, California	April 20
4	Motul Course de Monterey	2 hours, 40 minutes	GTP, GTD Pro, GTD	WeatherTech Raceway Laguna Seca	Monterey, California	May 12
5	Chevrolet Detroit Sports Car Classic	1 hour, 40 minutes	GTP, GTD Pro	Detroit Street Circuit	Detroit, Michigan	June 1
6	Sahlen's Six Hours of The Glen	6 hours	All	Watkins Glen International	Watkins Glen, New York	June 23
7	Chevrolet Grand Prix	2 hours, 40 minutes	LMP2, GTD Pro, GTD	Canadian Tire Motorsport Park	Bowmanville, Ontario	July 14
8	IMSA Sportscar Weekend	2 hours, 40 minutes	All	Road America	Elkhart Lake, Wisconsin	August 4
9	Michelin GT Challenge at VIR	2 hours, 40 minutes	GTD Pro, GTD	Virginia International Raceway	Alton, Virginia	August 25
10	Tirerack.com Battle on the Bricks	6 hours	All	Indianapolis Motor Speedway	Speedway, Indiana	September 22
11	Motul Petit Le Mans	10 hours	All	Michelin Raceway Road Atlanta	Braselton, Georgia	October 12

=== Calendar changes ===
- Lime Rock Park was dropped from the calendar. The track had been a part of the championship since 2015.
- The Michelin Endurance Cup expanded to 5 rounds, with the event at Indianapolis Motor Speedway transforming from a sprint race in 2023 to a six-hour endurance race for 2024.
- After a 1-year hiatus, Detroit returned to the IMSA calendar, with a sprint race on the Detroit Street Circuit.
- On September 7, 2023, the Watkins Glen date was moved one week earlier than originally announced, to avoid a clash with the 24 Hours of Spa.
- Canadian Tire Motorsport Park lost their GTP entries from previous seasons, with the LMP2 category becoming the headline category.

== Entries ==
=== Grand Touring Prototype (GTP) ===
Team	Chassis	Engine	No.	Drivers	Rounds
(United States) Cadillac Racing	Cadillac V-Series.R	Cadillac LMC55R 5.5 L V8	01	(France) Sébastien Bourdais	All
(United States) Cadillac Racing	Cadillac V-Series.R	Cadillac LMC55R 5.5 L V8	01	(Netherlands) Renger van der Zande	All
(United States) Cadillac Racing	Cadillac V-Series.R	Cadillac LMC55R 5.5 L V8	01	(New Zealand) Scott Dixon	1–2, 11
(United States) Cadillac Racing	Cadillac V-Series.R	Cadillac LMC55R 5.5 L V8	01	(Spain) Álex Palou	1
(Germany) Proton Competition Mustang Sampling	Porsche 963	Porsche 9RD 4.6 L twin-turbo V8	5	(Italy) Gianmaria Bruni	All
(Germany) Proton Competition Mustang Sampling	Porsche 963	Porsche 9RD 4.6 L twin-turbo V8	5	(Netherlands) Bent Viscaal	4–6, 8, 10–11
(Germany) Proton Competition Mustang Sampling	Porsche 963	Porsche 9RD 4.6 L twin-turbo V8	5	(Belgium) Alessio Picariello	1–2, 10–11
(Germany) Proton Competition Mustang Sampling	Porsche 963	Porsche 9RD 4.6 L twin-turbo V8	5	(France) Romain Dumas	1
(Germany) Proton Competition Mustang Sampling	Porsche 963	Porsche 9RD 4.6 L twin-turbo V8	5	(Switzerland) Neel Jani	1
(Germany) Proton Competition Mustang Sampling	Porsche 963	Porsche 9RD 4.6 L twin-turbo V8	5	(France) Julien Andlauer	2
(Germany) Proton Competition Mustang Sampling	Porsche 963	Porsche 9RD 4.6 L twin-turbo V8	5	(Germany) Mike Rockenfeller	3
(Germany) Porsche Penske Motorsport	Porsche 963	Porsche 9RD 4.6 L twin-turbo V8	6	(France) Mathieu Jaminet	All
(Germany) Porsche Penske Motorsport	Porsche 963	Porsche 9RD 4.6 L twin-turbo V8	6	(United Kingdom) Nick Tandy	All
(Germany) Porsche Penske Motorsport	Porsche 963	Porsche 9RD 4.6 L twin-turbo V8	6	(France) Kévin Estre	1, 11
(Germany) Porsche Penske Motorsport	Porsche 963	Porsche 9RD 4.6 L twin-turbo V8	6	(Belgium) Laurens Vanthoor	1
(Germany) Porsche Penske Motorsport	Porsche 963	Porsche 9RD 4.6 L twin-turbo V8	6	(France) Frédéric Makowiecki	2
(Germany) Porsche Penske Motorsport	Porsche 963	Porsche 9RD 4.6 L twin-turbo V8	7	(United States) Dane Cameron	All
(Germany) Porsche Penske Motorsport	Porsche 963	Porsche 9RD 4.6 L twin-turbo V8	7	(Brazil) Felipe Nasr	All
(Germany) Porsche Penske Motorsport	Porsche 963	Porsche 9RD 4.6 L twin-turbo V8	7	(Australia) Matt Campbell	1–2, 11
(Germany) Porsche Penske Motorsport	Porsche 963	Porsche 9RD 4.6 L twin-turbo V8	7	(United States) Josef Newgarden	1
(United States) Wayne Taylor Racing with Andretti	Acura ARX-06	Acura AR24e 2.4 L twin-turbo V6	10	(Portugal) Filipe Albuquerque	All
(United States) Wayne Taylor Racing with Andretti	Acura ARX-06	Acura AR24e 2.4 L twin-turbo V6	10	(United States) Ricky Taylor	All
(United States) Wayne Taylor Racing with Andretti	Acura ARX-06	Acura AR24e 2.4 L twin-turbo V6	10	(New Zealand) Brendon Hartley	1–2, 11
(United States) Wayne Taylor Racing with Andretti	Acura ARX-06	Acura AR24e 2.4 L twin-turbo V6	10	(Sweden) Marcus Ericsson	1
(United States) Wayne Taylor Racing with Andretti	Acura ARX-06	Acura AR24e 2.4 L twin-turbo V6	40	(Switzerland) Louis Delétraz	All
(United States) Wayne Taylor Racing with Andretti	Acura ARX-06	Acura AR24e 2.4 L twin-turbo V6	40	(United States) Jordan Taylor	All
(United States) Wayne Taylor Racing with Andretti	Acura ARX-06	Acura AR24e 2.4 L twin-turbo V6	40	(United States) Colton Herta	1–2, 11
(United States) Wayne Taylor Racing with Andretti	Acura ARX-06	Acura AR24e 2.4 L twin-turbo V6	40	(United Kingdom) Jenson Button	1
(United States) BMW M Team RLL	BMW M Hybrid V8	BMW P66/3 4.0 L twin-turbo V8	24	(Austria) Philipp Eng	All
(United States) BMW M Team RLL	BMW M Hybrid V8	BMW P66/3 4.0 L twin-turbo V8	24	(Finland) Jesse Krohn	All
(United States) BMW M Team RLL	BMW M Hybrid V8	BMW P66/3 4.0 L twin-turbo V8	24	(Brazil) Augusto Farfus	1–2, 11
(United States) BMW M Team RLL	BMW M Hybrid V8	BMW P66/3 4.0 L twin-turbo V8	24	(Belgium) Dries Vanthoor	1
(United States) BMW M Team RLL	BMW M Hybrid V8	BMW P66/3 4.0 L twin-turbo V8	25	(United States) Connor De Phillippi	All
(United States) BMW M Team RLL	BMW M Hybrid V8	BMW P66/3 4.0 L twin-turbo V8	25	(United Kingdom) Nick Yelloly	All
(United States) BMW M Team RLL	BMW M Hybrid V8	BMW P66/3 4.0 L twin-turbo V8	25	(Belgium) Maxime Martin	1–2, 11
(United States) BMW M Team RLL	BMW M Hybrid V8	BMW P66/3 4.0 L twin-turbo V8	25	(Germany) René Rast	1
(United States) Whelen Cadillac Racing	Cadillac V-Series.R	Cadillac LMC55R 5.5 L V8	31	(United Kingdom) Jack Aitken	All
(United States) Whelen Cadillac Racing	Cadillac V-Series.R	Cadillac LMC55R 5.5 L V8	31	(Brazil) Pipo Derani	All
(United States) Whelen Cadillac Racing	Cadillac V-Series.R	Cadillac LMC55R 5.5 L V8	31	(United Kingdom) Tom Blomqvist	1–2, 6, 10–11
(Italy) Lamborghini – Iron Lynx	Lamborghini SC63	Lamborghini 3.8 L twin-turbo V8	63	(Italy) Matteo Cairoli	2, 6, 10–11
(Italy) Lamborghini – Iron Lynx	Lamborghini SC63	Lamborghini 3.8 L twin-turbo V8	63	(Italy) Andrea Caldarelli	2, 6, 10–11
(Italy) Lamborghini – Iron Lynx	Lamborghini SC63	Lamborghini 3.8 L twin-turbo V8	63	(France) Romain Grosjean	2, 10–11
(United States) JDC–Miller MotorSports	Porsche 963	Porsche 9RD 4.6 L twin-turbo V8	85	(Netherlands) Tijmen van der Helm	All
(United States) JDC–Miller MotorSports	Porsche 963	Porsche 9RD 4.6 L twin-turbo V8	85	(United Kingdom) Richard Westbrook	All
(United States) JDC–Miller MotorSports	Porsche 963	Porsche 9RD 4.6 L twin-turbo V8	85	(United Kingdom) Phil Hanson	1–2, 6, 10–11
(United States) JDC–Miller MotorSports	Porsche 963	Porsche 9RD 4.6 L twin-turbo V8	85	(United States) Ben Keating	1

=== Le Mans Prototype 2 (LMP2) ===
In accordance with the 2017 LMP2 regulations, all cars in the LMP2 class use the Gibson GK428 V8 engine.

Team	Chassis	No.	Drivers	Rounds
(United States) CrowdStrike Racing by APR	Oreca 07	04	(United States) Colin Braun	1–2, 6–7
(United States) CrowdStrike Racing by APR	Oreca 07	04	(United States) George Kurtz	1–2, 6–7
(United States) CrowdStrike Racing by APR	Oreca 07	04	(United Kingdom) Toby Sowery	1–2, 6
(United States) CrowdStrike Racing by APR	Oreca 07	04	(Denmark) Malthe Jakobsen	1
(United States) United Autosports USA	Oreca 07	2	(United Kingdom) Ben Hanley	All
(United States) United Autosports USA	Oreca 07	2	(United States) Ben Keating	All
(United States) United Autosports USA	Oreca 07	2	(Chile) Nico Pino	1–2, 6, 10–11
(United States) United Autosports USA	Oreca 07	2	(Mexico) Pato O'Ward	1
(United States) United Autosports USA	Oreca 07	22	(United States) Dan Goldburg	All
(United States) United Autosports USA	Oreca 07	22	(United Kingdom) Paul di Resta	1–2, 6, 8, 10–11
(United States) United Autosports USA	Oreca 07	22	(United States) Bijoy Garg	1–2, 6, 10–11
(United States) United Autosports USA	Oreca 07	22	(Sweden) Felix Rosenqvist	1
(United States) United Autosports USA	Oreca 07	22	(Portugal) Filipe Albuquerque	7
(Canada) Tower Motorsports	Oreca 07	8	(Canada) John Farano	All
(Canada) Tower Motorsports	Oreca 07	8	(Republic of Ireland) Charlie Eastwood	2, 6, 8, 10
(Canada) Tower Motorsports	Oreca 07	8	(United States) Michael Dinan	1–2, 6, 10
(Canada) Tower Motorsports	Oreca 07	8	(Austria) Ferdinand Habsburg	1
(Canada) Tower Motorsports	Oreca 07	8	(New Zealand) Scott McLaughlin	1
(Canada) Tower Motorsports	Oreca 07	8	(Netherlands) Renger van der Zande	7
(Canada) Tower Motorsports	Oreca 07	8	(Mexico) Sebastián Álvarez	11
(Canada) Tower Motorsports	Oreca 07	8	(Denmark) Frederik Vesti	11
(France) TDS Racing	Oreca 07	11	(United States) Steven Thomas	All
(France) TDS Racing	Oreca 07	11	(Denmark) Mikkel Jensen	1–2, 6, 8, 10–11
(France) TDS Racing	Oreca 07	11	(New Zealand) Hunter McElrea	1–2, 6, 10–11
(France) TDS Racing	Oreca 07	11	(France) Charles Milesi	1
(France) TDS Racing	Oreca 07	11	(United States) Scott Huffaker	7
(United States) Era Motorsport	Oreca 07	18	(United Kingdom) Ryan Dalziel	All
(United States) Era Motorsport	Oreca 07	18	(United States) Dwight Merriman	1–2, 6, 10–11
(United States) Era Motorsport	Oreca 07	18	(United States) Connor Zilisch	1–2, 6, 10–11
(United States) Era Motorsport	Oreca 07	18	(United Kingdom) Stuart Wiltshire	7–8
(United States) Era Motorsport	Oreca 07	18	(Denmark) Christian Rasmussen	1
(Denmark) MDK by High Class Racing	Oreca 07	20	(Denmark) Dennis Andersen	All
(Denmark) MDK by High Class Racing	Oreca 07	20	(United States) Seth Lucas	All
(Denmark) MDK by High Class Racing	Oreca 07	20	(United States) Scott Huffaker	1, 6, 10–11
(Denmark) MDK by High Class Racing	Oreca 07	20	(Germany) Laurents Hörr	1–2
(United States) Sean Creech Motorsport	Ligier JS P217	33	(Portugal) João Barbosa	1–2, 6–8
(United States) Sean Creech Motorsport	Ligier JS P217	33	(United States) Lance Willsey	1–2, 6–7
(United States) Sean Creech Motorsport	Ligier JS P217	33	(United Kingdom) Jonny Edgar	1–2, 6
(United States) Sean Creech Motorsport	Ligier JS P217	33	(United States) Nolan Siegel	1
(United States) Sean Creech Motorsport	Ligier JS P217	33	(Estonia) Tõnis Kasemets	8
(Poland) Inter Europol by PR1/Mathiasen Motorsports	Oreca 07	52	(United States) Nick Boulle	All
(Poland) Inter Europol by PR1/Mathiasen Motorsports	Oreca 07	52	(France) Tom Dillmann	All
(Poland) Inter Europol by PR1/Mathiasen Motorsports	Oreca 07	52	(Poland) Jakub Śmiechowski	1–2, 6, 10–11
(Poland) Inter Europol by PR1/Mathiasen Motorsports	Oreca 07	52	(Brazil) Pietro Fittipaldi	1
(United States) Riley	Oreca 07	74	(Brazil) Felipe Fraga	All
(United States) Riley	Oreca 07	74	(United States) Gar Robinson	All
(United States) Riley	Oreca 07	74	(Australia) Josh Burdon	1–2, 6, 10–11
(United States) Riley	Oreca 07	74	(Brazil) Felipe Massa	1
(United States) JDC–Miller MotorSports	Oreca 07	79	(Australia) Scott Andrews	8
(United States) JDC–Miller MotorSports	Oreca 07	79	(United States) Gerry Kraut	8
(United States) DragonSpeed	Oreca 07	81	(United States) Eric Lux	1, 6
(United States) DragonSpeed	Oreca 07	81	(Sweden) Rasmus Lindh	2, 6
(United States) DragonSpeed	Oreca 07	81	(Australia) James Allen	1
(United States) DragonSpeed	Oreca 07	81	(Mexico) Sebastián Álvarez	1
(United States) DragonSpeed	Oreca 07	81	(Cayman Islands) Kyffin Simpson	1
(United States) DragonSpeed	Oreca 07	81	(Sweden) Henrik Hedman	2
(United States) DragonSpeed	Oreca 07	81	(Denmark) Malthe Jakobsen	2
(United States) DragonSpeed	Oreca 07	81	(Argentina) Nicolás Varrone	6
(Italy) Richard Mille AF Corse	Oreca 07	88	(Argentina) Luis Pérez Companc	All
(Italy) Richard Mille AF Corse	Oreca 07	88	(Denmark) Nicklas Nielsen	1–2, 6, 8, 10–11
(Italy) Richard Mille AF Corse	Oreca 07	88	(France) Lilou Wadoux	1–2, 6, 11
(Italy) Richard Mille AF Corse	Oreca 07	88	(France) Matthieu Vaxivière	1
(Italy) Richard Mille AF Corse	Oreca 07	88	(Brazil) Pipo Derani	7
(Italy) Richard Mille AF Corse	Oreca 07	88	(United States) Dylan Murry	10
(United States) AO Racing	Oreca 07	99	(United States) P. J. Hyett	All
(United States) AO Racing	Oreca 07	99	(France) Paul-Loup Chatin	1–2, 6, 8, 10–11
(United States) AO Racing	Oreca 07	99	(Australia) Matthew Brabham	1–2, 6, 10–11
(United States) AO Racing	Oreca 07	99	(United Kingdom) Alex Quinn	1
(United States) AO Racing	Oreca 07	99	(Switzerland) Louis Delétraz	7

=== GT Daytona (GTD Pro / GTD) ===
Team	Chassis	Engine	No.	Drivers	Rounds
GTD Pro
(United States) Heart of Racing Team	Aston Martin Vantage AMR GT3 Evo	Aston Martin M177 4.0 L Turbo V8	027	(Germany) Mario Farnbacher	10–11
(United States) Heart of Racing Team	Aston Martin Vantage AMR GT3 Evo	Aston Martin M177 4.0 L Turbo V8	027	(Canada) Roman De Angelis	10
(United States) Heart of Racing Team	Aston Martin Vantage AMR GT3 Evo	Aston Martin M177 4.0 L Turbo V8	027	(Canada) Zacharie Robichon	11
(United States) Heart of Racing Team	Aston Martin Vantage AMR GT3 Evo	Aston Martin M177 4.0 L Turbo V8	027	(Denmark) Marco Sørensen	11
(United States) Heart of Racing Team	Aston Martin Vantage AMR GT3 Evo	Aston Martin M177 4.0 L Turbo V8	23	(United Kingdom) Ross Gunn	All
(United States) Heart of Racing Team	Aston Martin Vantage AMR GT3 Evo	Aston Martin M177 4.0 L Turbo V8	23	(Spain) Alex Riberas	1–2, 5–6, 8–11
(United States) Heart of Racing Team	Aston Martin Vantage AMR GT3 Evo	Aston Martin M177 4.0 L Turbo V8	23	(Germany) Mario Farnbacher	1–2, 4, 7
(United States) Heart of Racing Team	Aston Martin Vantage AMR GT3 Evo	Aston Martin M177 4.0 L Turbo V8	23	(Canada) Roman De Angelis	11
(United States) Paul Miller Racing	BMW M4 GT3	BMW P58 3.0 L Turbo I6	1	(United States) Bryan Sellers	All
(United States) Paul Miller Racing	BMW M4 GT3	BMW P58 3.0 L Turbo I6	1	(United States) Madison Snow	All
(United States) Paul Miller Racing	BMW M4 GT3	BMW P58 3.0 L Turbo I6	1	(United States) Neil Verhagen	1–2, 6, 10–11
(United States) Paul Miller Racing	BMW M4 GT3	BMW P58 3.0 L Turbo I6	1	(South Africa) Sheldon van der Linde	1
(United States) Corvette Racing by Pratt Miller Motorsports	Chevrolet Corvette Z06 GT3.R	Chevrolet LT6 5.5 L V8	3	(Spain) Antonio García	All
(United States) Corvette Racing by Pratt Miller Motorsports	Chevrolet Corvette Z06 GT3.R	Chevrolet LT6 5.5 L V8	3	(United Kingdom) Alexander Sims	All
(United States) Corvette Racing by Pratt Miller Motorsports	Chevrolet Corvette Z06 GT3.R	Chevrolet LT6 5.5 L V8	3	(Spain) Daniel Juncadella	1–2, 11
(United States) Corvette Racing by Pratt Miller Motorsports	Chevrolet Corvette Z06 GT3.R	Chevrolet LT6 5.5 L V8	4	(Netherlands) Nicky Catsburg	All
(United States) Corvette Racing by Pratt Miller Motorsports	Chevrolet Corvette Z06 GT3.R	Chevrolet LT6 5.5 L V8	4	(United States) Tommy Milner	All
(United States) Corvette Racing by Pratt Miller Motorsports	Chevrolet Corvette Z06 GT3.R	Chevrolet LT6 5.5 L V8	4	(New Zealand) Earl Bamber	1–2, 11
(Canada) Pfaff Motorsports	McLaren 720S GT3 Evo	McLaren M840T 4.0 L Turbo V8	9	(United Kingdom) Oliver Jarvis	All
(Canada) Pfaff Motorsports	McLaren 720S GT3 Evo	McLaren M840T 4.0 L Turbo V8	9	(Germany) Marvin Kirchhöfer	All
(Canada) Pfaff Motorsports	McLaren 720S GT3 Evo	McLaren M840T 4.0 L Turbo V8	9	(Canada) James Hinchcliffe	1–2, 11
(Canada) Pfaff Motorsports	McLaren 720S GT3 Evo	McLaren M840T 4.0 L Turbo V8	9	(United States) Alexander Rossi	1
(United States) Vasser Sullivan	Lexus RC F GT3	Toyota 2UR-GSE 5.4 L V8	14	(United Kingdom) Ben Barnicoat	All
(United States) Vasser Sullivan	Lexus RC F GT3	Toyota 2UR-GSE 5.4 L V8	14	(United Kingdom) Jack Hawksworth	All
(United States) Vasser Sullivan	Lexus RC F GT3	Toyota 2UR-GSE 5.4 L V8	14	(United States) Kyle Kirkwood	1–2, 11
(United States) Vasser Sullivan	Lexus RC F GT3	Toyota 2UR-GSE 5.4 L V8	14	(United Kingdom) Mike Conway	1
(United States) Vasser Sullivan	Lexus RC F GT3	Toyota 2UR-GSE 5.4 L V8	15	(United States) Frankie Montecalvo	5
(United States) Vasser Sullivan	Lexus RC F GT3	Toyota 2UR-GSE 5.4 L V8	15	(Canada) Parker Thompson	5
(Italy) Iron Lynx	Lamborghini Huracán GT3 Evo 2	Lamborghini DGF 5.2 L V10	19	(South Africa) Jordan Pepper	1–2, 6, 11
(Italy) Iron Lynx	Lamborghini Huracán GT3 Evo 2	Lamborghini DGF 5.2 L V10	19	(France) Franck Perera	1–2, 6, 11
(Italy) Iron Lynx	Lamborghini Huracán GT3 Evo 2	Lamborghini DGF 5.2 L V10	19	(Italy) Mirko Bortolotti	1–2, 11
(Italy) Iron Lynx	Lamborghini Huracán GT3 Evo 2	Lamborghini DGF 5.2 L V10	19	(Italy) Andrea Caldarelli	1
(Italy) Iron Lynx	Lamborghini Huracán GT3 Evo 2	Lamborghini DGF 5.2 L V10	19	(Germany) Luca Engstler	10
(Italy) Iron Lynx	Lamborghini Huracán GT3 Evo 2	Lamborghini DGF 5.2 L V10	19	(Germany) Maximilian Paul	10
(Italy) Iron Lynx	Lamborghini Huracán GT3 Evo 2	Lamborghini DGF 5.2 L V10	60	(Italy) Matteo Cressoni	1–2
(Italy) Iron Lynx	Lamborghini Huracán GT3 Evo 2	Lamborghini DGF 5.2 L V10	60	(Italy) Claudio Schiavoni	1–2
(Italy) Iron Lynx	Lamborghini Huracán GT3 Evo 2	Lamborghini DGF 5.2 L V10	60	(Italy) Matteo Cairoli	1
(Italy) Iron Lynx	Lamborghini Huracán GT3 Evo 2	Lamborghini DGF 5.2 L V10	60	(France) Romain Grosjean	1
(Italy) Iron Lynx	Lamborghini Huracán GT3 Evo 2	Lamborghini DGF 5.2 L V10	60	(Italy) Leonardo Pulcini	2
(United States) Conquest Racing	Ferrari 296 GT3	Ferrari F163CE 3.0 L Turbo V6	35	(Brazil) Daniel Serra	5, 8
(United States) Conquest Racing	Ferrari 296 GT3	Ferrari F163CE 3.0 L Turbo V6	35	(Spain) Albert Costa	5
(United States) Conquest Racing	Ferrari 296 GT3	Ferrari F163CE 3.0 L Turbo V6	35	(Italy) Giacomo Altoè	8
(United States) Risi Competizione	Ferrari 296 GT3	Ferrari F163CE 3.0 L Turbo V6	62	(Italy) Davide Rigon	1–2, 6, 10–11
(United States) Risi Competizione	Ferrari 296 GT3	Ferrari F163CE 3.0 L Turbo V6	62	(Brazil) Daniel Serra	1–2, 6, 10–11
(United States) Risi Competizione	Ferrari 296 GT3	Ferrari F163CE 3.0 L Turbo V6	62	(United Kingdom) James Calado	1–2
(United States) Risi Competizione	Ferrari 296 GT3	Ferrari F163CE 3.0 L Turbo V6	62	(Italy) Alessandro Pier Guidi	1, 11
(Canada) Ford Multimatic Motorsports	Ford Mustang GT3	Ford Coyote 5.4 L V8	64	(Germany) Mike Rockenfeller	All
(Canada) Ford Multimatic Motorsports	Ford Mustang GT3	Ford Coyote 5.4 L V8	64	(United Kingdom) Harry Tincknell	All
(Canada) Ford Multimatic Motorsports	Ford Mustang GT3	Ford Coyote 5.4 L V8	64	(Germany) Christopher Mies	1–2, 11
(Canada) Ford Multimatic Motorsports	Ford Mustang GT3	Ford Coyote 5.4 L V8	65	(United States) Joey Hand	All
(Canada) Ford Multimatic Motorsports	Ford Mustang GT3	Ford Coyote 5.4 L V8	65	(Germany) Dirk Müller	All
(Canada) Ford Multimatic Motorsports	Ford Mustang GT3	Ford Coyote 5.4 L V8	65	(Belgium) Frédéric Vervisch	1–2, 11
(Australia) SunEnergy1 Racing	Mercedes-AMG GT3 Evo	Mercedes-AMG M159 6.2 L V8	75	(Australia) Kenny Habul	1, 10
(Australia) SunEnergy1 Racing	Mercedes-AMG GT3 Evo	Mercedes-AMG M159 6.2 L V8	75	(Germany) Maro Engel	1
(Australia) SunEnergy1 Racing	Mercedes-AMG GT3 Evo	Mercedes-AMG M159 6.2 L V8	75	(Andorra) Jules Gounon	1
(Australia) SunEnergy1 Racing	Mercedes-AMG GT3 Evo	Mercedes-AMG M159 6.2 L V8	75	(Germany) Luca Stolz	1
(Australia) SunEnergy1 Racing	Mercedes-AMG GT3 Evo	Mercedes-AMG M159 6.2 L V8	75	(Australia) Jordan Love	10
(Australia) SunEnergy1 Racing	Mercedes-AMG GT3 Evo	Mercedes-AMG M159 6.2 L V8	75	(Australia) Chaz Mostert	10
(United States) AO Racing	Porsche 911 GT3 R (992)	Porsche M97/80 4.2 L Flat-6	77	(Germany) Laurin Heinrich	All
(United States) AO Racing	Porsche 911 GT3 R (992)	Porsche M97/80 4.2 L Flat-6	77	(United Kingdom) Sebastian Priaulx	1–2, 4–7
(United States) AO Racing	Porsche 911 GT3 R (992)	Porsche M97/80 4.2 L Flat-6	77	(Denmark) Michael Christensen	1–2, 10–11
(United States) AO Racing	Porsche 911 GT3 R (992)	Porsche M97/80 4.2 L Flat-6	77	(France) Julien Andlauer	8, 11
(United States) AO Racing	Porsche 911 GT3 R (992)	Porsche M97/80 4.2 L Flat-6	77	(Austria) Klaus Bachler	9
(United States) DragonSpeed	Ferrari 296 GT3	Ferrari F163CE 3.0 L Turbo V6	82	(Monaco) Vincent Abril	11
(United States) DragonSpeed	Ferrari 296 GT3	Ferrari F163CE 3.0 L Turbo V6	82	(France) Thomas Neubauer	11
(United States) DragonSpeed	Ferrari 296 GT3	Ferrari F163CE 3.0 L Turbo V6	82	(Finland) Toni Vilander	11
GTD
(United States) Triarsi Competizione	Ferrari 296 GT3	Ferrari F163CE 3.0 L Turbo V6	023	(United States) Onofrio Triarsi	1–2, 6, 8, 10–11
(United States) Triarsi Competizione	Ferrari 296 GT3	Ferrari F163CE 3.0 L Turbo V6	023	(Italy) Alessio Rovera	1–2, 6, 8, 11
(United States) Triarsi Competizione	Ferrari 296 GT3	Ferrari F163CE 3.0 L Turbo V6	023	(United States) Charlie Scardina	1–2, 6, 10–11
(United States) Triarsi Competizione	Ferrari 296 GT3	Ferrari F163CE 3.0 L Turbo V6	023	(Italy) Riccardo Agostini	1, 10
(United States) Vasser Sullivan	Lexus RC F GT3	Toyota 2UR-GSE 5.4 L V8	12	(United States) Frankie Montecalvo	All
(United States) Vasser Sullivan	Lexus RC F GT3	Toyota 2UR-GSE 5.4 L V8	12	(Canada) Parker Thompson	1–2, 4, 6–11
(United States) Vasser Sullivan	Lexus RC F GT3	Toyota 2UR-GSE 5.4 L V8	12	(United States) Aaron Telitz	1–2, 6, 10–11
(United States) Vasser Sullivan	Lexus RC F GT3	Toyota 2UR-GSE 5.4 L V8	12	(Japan) Ritomo Miyata	1
(United States) Vasser Sullivan	Lexus RC F GT3	Toyota 2UR-GSE 5.4 L V8	12	(United Kingdom) Jack Hawksworth	3
(United States) Vasser Sullivan	Lexus RC F GT3	Toyota 2UR-GSE 5.4 L V8	89	(United Kingdom) Ben Barnicoat	3
(United States) Vasser Sullivan	Lexus RC F GT3	Toyota 2UR-GSE 5.4 L V8	89	(Canada) Parker Thompson	3
(Canada) AWA	Chevrolet Corvette Z06 GT3.R	Chevrolet LT6 5.5 L V8	13	(United Kingdom) Matt Bell	All
(Canada) AWA	Chevrolet Corvette Z06 GT3.R	Chevrolet LT6 5.5 L V8	13	(Canada) Orey Fidani	All
(Canada) AWA	Chevrolet Corvette Z06 GT3.R	Chevrolet LT6 5.5 L V8	13	(Germany) Lars Kern	1–2, 6, 10–11
(Canada) AWA	Chevrolet Corvette Z06 GT3.R	Chevrolet LT6 5.5 L V8	13	(United Kingdom) Alex Lynn	1
(Canada) AWA	Chevrolet Corvette Z06 GT3.R	Chevrolet LT6 5.5 L V8	17	(Canada) Anthony Mantella	1–2
(Canada) AWA	Chevrolet Corvette Z06 GT3.R	Chevrolet LT6 5.5 L V8	17	(United States) Thomas Merrill	1–2
(Canada) AWA	Chevrolet Corvette Z06 GT3.R	Chevrolet LT6 5.5 L V8	17	(Argentina) Nicolás Varrone	1–2
(Canada) AWA	Chevrolet Corvette Z06 GT3.R	Chevrolet LT6 5.5 L V8	17	(Republic of Ireland) Charlie Eastwood	1
(Italy) AF Corse	Ferrari 296 GT3	Ferrari F163CE 3.0 L Turbo V6	21	(France) François Hériau	1–2, 6, 10–11
(Italy) AF Corse	Ferrari 296 GT3	Ferrari F163CE 3.0 L Turbo V6	21	(United Kingdom) Simon Mann	1–2, 6, 10–11
(Italy) AF Corse	Ferrari 296 GT3	Ferrari F163CE 3.0 L Turbo V6	21	(Spain) Miguel Molina	1–2, 6, 10–11
(Italy) AF Corse	Ferrari 296 GT3	Ferrari F163CE 3.0 L Turbo V6	21	(Japan) Kei Cozzolino	1
(United States) Heart of Racing Team	Aston Martin Vantage AMR GT3 Evo	Aston Martin M177 4.0 L Turbo V8	27	(Canada) Roman De Angelis	1–4, 6–9
(United States) Heart of Racing Team	Aston Martin Vantage AMR GT3 Evo	Aston Martin M177 4.0 L Turbo V8	27	(Canada) Zacharie Robichon	1–2, 6, 8–9
(United States) Heart of Racing Team	Aston Martin Vantage AMR GT3 Evo	Aston Martin M177 4.0 L Turbo V8	27	(United Kingdom) Ian James	1–2, 6
(United States) Heart of Racing Team	Aston Martin Vantage AMR GT3 Evo	Aston Martin M177 4.0 L Turbo V8	27	(United States) Spencer Pumpelly	3–4, 7
(United States) Heart of Racing Team	Aston Martin Vantage AMR GT3 Evo	Aston Martin M177 4.0 L Turbo V8	27	(Denmark) Marco Sørensen	1
(United States) Flying Lizard Motorsports	Aston Martin Vantage AMR GT3 Evo	Aston Martin M177 4.0 L Turbo V8	28	(United States) Andy Lee	3
(United States) Flying Lizard Motorsports	Aston Martin Vantage AMR GT3 Evo	Aston Martin M177 4.0 L Turbo V8	28	(United States) Elias Sabo	3
(United States) Korthoff/Preston Motorsports	Mercedes-AMG GT3 Evo	Mercedes-AMG M159 6.2 L V8	32	(Canada) Mikaël Grenier	All
(United States) Korthoff/Preston Motorsports	Mercedes-AMG GT3 Evo	Mercedes-AMG M159 6.2 L V8	32	(United States) Mike Skeen	1–4, 6–7, 11
(United States) Korthoff/Preston Motorsports	Mercedes-AMG GT3 Evo	Mercedes-AMG M159 6.2 L V8	32	(United States) Kenton Koch	1–2, 6, 8–11
(United States) Korthoff/Preston Motorsports	Mercedes-AMG GT3 Evo	Mercedes-AMG M159 6.2 L V8	32	(Germany) Maximilian Götz	1
(United States) Conquest Racing	Ferrari 296 GT3	Ferrari F163CE 3.0 L Turbo V6	34	(Spain) Albert Costa	All
(United States) Conquest Racing	Ferrari 296 GT3	Ferrari F163CE 3.0 L Turbo V6	34	(United States) Manny Franco	All
(United States) Conquest Racing	Ferrari 296 GT3	Ferrari F163CE 3.0 L Turbo V6	34	(Monaco) Cédric Sbirrazzuoli	1–2, 6, 10–11
(United States) Conquest Racing	Ferrari 296 GT3	Ferrari F163CE 3.0 L Turbo V6	34	(Italy) Alessandro Balzan	1
(United States) / Andretti Motorsports (Note: Car No. 43 entered as Andretti Motorsports and car No. 45 entered as Wayne Taylor Racing with Andretti.); (United States) / Wayne Taylor Racing with Andretti	Porsche 911 GT3 R (992)	Porsche M97/80 4.2 L Flat-6	43	(United States) Jarett Andretti	1–4, 6, 10
(United States) / Andretti Motorsports; (United States) / Wayne Taylor Racing with Andretti	Porsche 911 GT3 R (992)	Porsche M97/80 4.2 L Flat-6	43	(Colombia) Gabby Chaves	1–4, 6, 10
(United States) / Andretti Motorsports; (United States) / Wayne Taylor Racing with Andretti	Porsche 911 GT3 R (992)	Porsche M97/80 4.2 L Flat-6	43	(Canada) Scott Hargrove	1–2, 6, 10
(United States) / Andretti Motorsports; (United States) / Wayne Taylor Racing with Andretti	Porsche 911 GT3 R (992)	Porsche M97/80 4.2 L Flat-6	43	(Austria) Thomas Preining	1
(United States) / Andretti Motorsports; (United States) / Wayne Taylor Racing with Andretti	Lamborghini Huracán GT3 Evo 2	Lamborghini DGF 5.2 L V10	45	(Costa Rica) Danny Formal	All
(United States) / Andretti Motorsports; (United States) / Wayne Taylor Racing with Andretti	Lamborghini Huracán GT3 Evo 2	Lamborghini DGF 5.2 L V10	45	(Canada) Kyle Marcelli	1–4, 6–7, 9–11
(United States) / Andretti Motorsports; (United States) / Wayne Taylor Racing with Andretti	Lamborghini Huracán GT3 Evo 2	Lamborghini DGF 5.2 L V10	45	(United States) Graham Doyle	1–2, 6, 10–11
(United States) / Andretti Motorsports; (United States) / Wayne Taylor Racing with Andretti	Lamborghini Huracán GT3 Evo 2	Lamborghini DGF 5.2 L V10	45	(United States) Ashton Harrison	1
(United States) / Andretti Motorsports; (United States) / Wayne Taylor Racing with Andretti	Lamborghini Huracán GT3 Evo 2	Lamborghini DGF 5.2 L V10	45	(United Kingdom) Sandy Mitchell	8
(United States) Magnus Racing	Aston Martin Vantage AMR GT3 Evo	Aston Martin M177 4.0 L Turbo V8	44	(United States) Andy Lally	1–2, 6, 10–11
(United States) Magnus Racing	Aston Martin Vantage AMR GT3 Evo	Aston Martin M177 4.0 L Turbo V8	44	(United States) John Potter	1–2, 6, 10–11
(United States) Magnus Racing	Aston Martin Vantage AMR GT3 Evo	Aston Martin M177 4.0 L Turbo V8	44	(United States) Spencer Pumpelly	1–2, 6, 10–11
(United States) Magnus Racing	Aston Martin Vantage AMR GT3 Evo	Aston Martin M177 4.0 L Turbo V8	44	(Denmark) Nicki Thiim	1
(Italy) Cetilar Racing	Ferrari 296 GT3	Ferrari F163CE 3.0 L Turbo V6	47	(Italy) Antonio Fuoco	1–2, 6, 10–11
(Italy) Cetilar Racing	Ferrari 296 GT3	Ferrari F163CE 3.0 L Turbo V6	47	(Italy) Roberto Lacorte	1–2, 6, 10–11
(Italy) Cetilar Racing	Ferrari 296 GT3	Ferrari F163CE 3.0 L Turbo V6	47	(Italy) Giorgio Sernagiotto	1–2, 6, 10–11
(Italy) Cetilar Racing	Ferrari 296 GT3	Ferrari F163CE 3.0 L Turbo V6	47	(Italy) Eddie Cheever III	1
(Germany) Proton Competition	Ford Mustang GT3	Ford Coyote 5.4 L V8	55	(Italy) Giammarco Levorato	All
(Germany) Proton Competition	Ford Mustang GT3	Ford Coyote 5.4 L V8	55	(United States) Corey Lewis	All
(Germany) Proton Competition	Ford Mustang GT3	Ford Coyote 5.4 L V8	55	(United States) Ryan Hardwick	1–2, 6, 11
(Germany) Proton Competition	Ford Mustang GT3	Ford Coyote 5.4 L V8	55	(Norway) Dennis Olsen	1
(Germany) Proton Competition	Ford Mustang GT3	Ford Coyote 5.4 L V8	55	(United Kingdom) Ben Barker	10
(United States) DragonSpeed	Ferrari 296 GT3	Ferrari F163CE 3.0 L Turbo V6	56	(Sweden) Henrik Hedman	10
(United States) DragonSpeed	Ferrari 296 GT3	Ferrari F163CE 3.0 L Turbo V6	56	(Sweden) Rasmus Lindh	10
(United States) DragonSpeed	Ferrari 296 GT3	Ferrari F163CE 3.0 L Turbo V6	56	(Finland) Toni Vilander	10
(United States) Winward Racing	Mercedes-AMG GT3 Evo	Mercedes-AMG M159 6.2 L V8	57	(Switzerland) Philip Ellis	All
(United States) Winward Racing	Mercedes-AMG GT3 Evo	Mercedes-AMG M159 6.2 L V8	57	(United States) Russell Ward	All
(United States) Winward Racing	Mercedes-AMG GT3 Evo	Mercedes-AMG M159 6.2 L V8	57	(Netherlands) Indy Dontje	1–2, 6, 10–11
(United States) Winward Racing	Mercedes-AMG GT3 Evo	Mercedes-AMG M159 6.2 L V8	57	(Canada) Daniel Morad	1
(United States) Gradient Racing	Acura NSX GT3 Evo22	Acura JNC1 3.5 L Turbo V6	66	(United States) Sheena Monk	All
(United States) Gradient Racing	Acura NSX GT3 Evo22	Acura JNC1 3.5 L Turbo V6	66	(United Kingdom) Stevan McAleer	1, 3–4, 6–11
(United States) Gradient Racing	Acura NSX GT3 Evo22	Acura JNC1 3.5 L Turbo V6	66	(Colombia) Tatiana Calderón	1–2, 6, 10–11
(United States) Gradient Racing	Acura NSX GT3 Evo22	Acura JNC1 3.5 L Turbo V6	66	(United Kingdom) Katherine Legge	1–2
(United Kingdom) Inception Racing	McLaren 720S GT3 Evo 8 Ferrari 296 GT3 2	McLaren M840T 4.0 L Turbo V8; Ferrari F163CE 3.0 L Turbo V6	70	(United States) Brendan Iribe	All
(United Kingdom) Inception Racing	McLaren 720S GT3 Evo 8 Ferrari 296 GT3 2	McLaren M840T 4.0 L Turbo V8; Ferrari F163CE 3.0 L Turbo V6	70	(Denmark) Frederik Schandorff	All
(United Kingdom) Inception Racing	McLaren 720S GT3 Evo 8 Ferrari 296 GT3 2	McLaren M840T 4.0 L Turbo V8; Ferrari F163CE 3.0 L Turbo V6	70	(United Kingdom) Ollie Millroy	1–2, 6, 10–11
(United Kingdom) Inception Racing	McLaren 720S GT3 Evo 8 Ferrari 296 GT3 2	McLaren M840T 4.0 L Turbo V8; Ferrari F163CE 3.0 L Turbo V6	70	(United Kingdom) Tom Gamble	1
(United States) Forte Racing	Lamborghini Huracán GT3 Evo 2	Lamborghini DGF 5.2 L V10	78	(Canada) Misha Goikhberg	All
(United States) Forte Racing	Lamborghini Huracán GT3 Evo 2	Lamborghini DGF 5.2 L V10	78	(Italy) Loris Spinelli	All
(United States) Forte Racing	Lamborghini Huracán GT3 Evo 2	Lamborghini DGF 5.2 L V10	78	(Canada) Devlin DeFrancesco	1–2, 6, 10–11
(United States) Forte Racing	Lamborghini Huracán GT3 Evo 2	Lamborghini DGF 5.2 L V10	78	(United Kingdom) Sandy Mitchell	1
(United States) Lone Star Racing	Mercedes-AMG GT3 Evo	Mercedes-AMG M159 6.2 L V8	80	(Angola) Rui Andrade	1–2, 6, 10–11
(United States) Lone Star Racing	Mercedes-AMG GT3 Evo	Mercedes-AMG M159 6.2 L V8	80	(Australia) Scott Andrews	1–2, 6, 10–11
(United States) Lone Star Racing	Mercedes-AMG GT3 Evo	Mercedes-AMG M159 6.2 L V8	80	(Turkey) Salih Yoluç	1–2, 6, 10–11
(United States) Lone Star Racing	Mercedes-AMG GT3 Evo	Mercedes-AMG M159 6.2 L V8	80	(United Kingdom) Adam Christodoulou	1
(Italy) Iron Dames	Lamborghini Huracán GT3 Evo 2	Lamborghini DGF 5.2 L V10	83	(Belgium) Sarah Bovy	1–2, 6, 10–11
(Italy) Iron Dames	Lamborghini Huracán GT3 Evo 2	Lamborghini DGF 5.2 L V10	83	(Switzerland) Rahel Frey	1–2, 6, 10–11
(Italy) Iron Dames	Lamborghini Huracán GT3 Evo 2	Lamborghini DGF 5.2 L V10	83	(Denmark) Michelle Gatting	1–2, 6, 10–11
(Italy) Iron Dames	Lamborghini Huracán GT3 Evo 2	Lamborghini DGF 5.2 L V10	83	(France) Doriane Pin	1
(United States) MDK Motorsports	Porsche 911 GT3 R (992)	Porsche M97/80 4.2 L Flat-6	86	(Denmark) Anders Fjordbach	All
(United States) MDK Motorsports	Porsche 911 GT3 R (992)	Porsche M97/80 4.2 L Flat-6	86	(China) Kerong Li	All
(United States) MDK Motorsports	Porsche 911 GT3 R (992)	Porsche M97/80 4.2 L Flat-6	86	(Austria) Klaus Bachler	1–2, 6, 11
(United States) MDK Motorsports	Porsche 911 GT3 R (992)	Porsche M97/80 4.2 L Flat-6	86	(Netherlands) Larry ten Voorde	1
(United States) MDK Motorsports	Porsche 911 GT3 R (992)	Porsche M97/80 4.2 L Flat-6	86	(New Zealand) Brendon Leitch	10
(United States) Kellymoss with Riley	Porsche 911 GT3 R (992)	Porsche M97/80 4.2 L Flat-6	90	(Netherlands) Kay van Berlo	10
(United States) Kellymoss with Riley	Porsche 911 GT3 R (992)	Porsche M97/80 4.2 L Flat-6	90	(United States) Riley Dickinson	10
(United States) Kellymoss with Riley	Porsche 911 GT3 R (992)	Porsche M97/80 4.2 L Flat-6	90	(United States) Jake Pedersen	10
(United States) Kellymoss with Riley	Porsche 911 GT3 R (992)	Porsche M97/80 4.2 L Flat-6	92	(France) Julien Andlauer	1
(United States) Kellymoss with Riley	Porsche 911 GT3 R (992)	Porsche M97/80 4.2 L Flat-6	92	(United States) David Brule	1
(United States) Kellymoss with Riley	Porsche 911 GT3 R (992)	Porsche M97/80 4.2 L Flat-6	92	(United States) Trent Hindman	1
(United States) Kellymoss with Riley	Porsche 911 GT3 R (992)	Porsche M97/80 4.2 L Flat-6	92	(United States) Alec Udell	1
(United States) Turner Motorsport	BMW M4 GT3	BMW P58 3.0 L Turbo I6	96	(United States) Robby Foley	All
(United States) Turner Motorsport	BMW M4 GT3	BMW P58 3.0 L Turbo I6	96	(United States) Patrick Gallagher	All
(United States) Turner Motorsport	BMW M4 GT3	BMW P58 3.0 L Turbo I6	96	(United States) Jake Walker	1–2, 6, 10–11
(United States) Turner Motorsport	BMW M4 GT3	BMW P58 3.0 L Turbo I6	96	(Germany) Jens Klingmann	1
(United States) Wright Motorsports	Porsche 911 GT3 R (992)	Porsche M97/80 4.2 L Flat-6	120	(United States) Adam Adelson	1–4, 6, 8–11
(United States) Wright Motorsports	Porsche 911 GT3 R (992)	Porsche M97/80 4.2 L Flat-6	120	(United States) Elliott Skeer	1–4, 6, 8–11
(United States) Wright Motorsports	Porsche 911 GT3 R (992)	Porsche M97/80 4.2 L Flat-6	120	(Belgium) Jan Heylen	1–2, 6, 10–11
(United States) Wright Motorsports	Porsche 911 GT3 R (992)	Porsche M97/80 4.2 L Flat-6	120	(France) Frédéric Makowiecki	1

- California-based team CDR Valkyrie announced plans to enter selected rounds with a Porsche 911 GT3 R (992), but did not appear at any events.

== Race results ==
Bold indicates overall and GTD winners.

Rnd	Circuit	GTP Winning Team	LMP2 Winning Team	GTD Pro Winning Team	GTD Winning Team	Report
Rnd	Circuit	GTP Winning Drivers	LMP2 Winning Drivers	GTD Pro Winning Drivers	GTD Winning Drivers	Report
1	Daytona	**(Germany) #7 Porsche Penske Motorsport**	(United States) #18 Era Motorsport	**(United States) #62 Risi Competizione**	(United States) #57 Winward Racing	Report
1	Daytona	**(United States) Dane Cameron** **(Australia) Matt Campbell** **(Brazil) Felipe Nasr** **(United States) Josef Newgarden**	(United Kingdom) Ryan Dalziel (United States) Dwight Merriman (Denmark) Christian Rasmussen (United States) Connor Zilisch	**(United Kingdom) James Calado** **(Italy) Alessandro Pier Guidi** **(Italy) Davide Rigon** **(Brazil) Daniel Serra**	(Netherlands) Indy Dontje (Switzerland) Philip Ellis (Canada) Daniel Morad (United States) Russell Ward	Report
2	Sebring	**(United States) #40 Wayne Taylor Racing with Andretti**	(United States) #18 Era Motorsport	**(United States) #14 Vasser Sullivan**	(United States) #57 Winward Racing	Report
2	Sebring	**(Switzerland) Louis Delétraz** **(United States) Colton Herta** **(United States) Jordan Taylor**	(United Kingdom) Ryan Dalziel (United States) Dwight Merriman (United States) Connor Zilisch	**(United Kingdom) Ben Barnicoat** **(United Kingdom) Jack Hawksworth** **(United States) Kyle Kirkwood**	(Netherlands) Indy Dontje (Switzerland) Philip Ellis (United States) Russell Ward	Report
3	Long Beach	**(United States) #01 Cadillac Racing**	did not participate	did not participate	**(United States) #89 Vasser Sullivan**	Report
3	Long Beach	**(France) Sébastien Bourdais** **(Netherlands) Renger van der Zande**	did not participate	did not participate	**(United Kingdom) Ben Barnicoat** **(Canada) Parker Thompson**	Report
4	Laguna Seca	**(Germany) #6 Porsche Penske Motorsport**	did not participate	**(United States) #77 AO Racing**	(United States) #57 Winward Racing	Report
4	Laguna Seca	**(France) Mathieu Jaminet** **(United Kingdom) Nick Tandy**	did not participate	**(Germany) Laurin Heinrich** **(United Kingdom) Sebastian Priaulx**	(Switzerland) Philip Ellis (United States) Russell Ward	Report
5	Detroit	**(United States) #10 Wayne Taylor Racing with Andretti**	did not participate	**(United States) #77 AO Racing**	did not participate	Report
5	Detroit	**(Portugal) Filipe Albuquerque** **(United States) Ricky Taylor**	did not participate	**(Germany) Laurin Heinrich** **(United Kingdom) Sebastian Priaulx**	did not participate	Report
6	Watkins Glen	**(Germany) #7 Porsche Penske Motorsport**	(Italy) #88 Richard Mille AF Corse	**(United States) #23 Heart of Racing Team**	(United States) #57 Winward Racing	Report
6	Watkins Glen	**(United States) Dane Cameron** **(Brazil) Felipe Nasr**	(Denmark) Nicklas Nielsen (Argentina) Luis Pérez Companc (France) Lilou Wadoux	**(United Kingdom) Ross Gunn** **(Spain) Alex Riberas**	(Netherlands) Indy Dontje (Switzerland) Philip Ellis (United States) Russell Ward	Report
7	Mosport	did not participate	**(Poland) #52 Inter Europol by PR1/Mathiasen Motorsports**	**(United States) #3 Corvette Racing by Pratt Miller Motorsports**	(United States) #27 Heart of Racing Team	Report
7	Mosport	did not participate	**(United States) Nick Boulle** **(France) Tom Dillmann**	**(Spain) Antonio García** **(United Kingdom) Alexander Sims**	(Canada) Roman De Angelis (United States) Spencer Pumpelly	Report
8	Road America	**(Germany) #6 Porsche Penske Motorsport**	(United States) #2 United Autosports USA	**(United States) #35 Conquest Racing**	(United States) #96 Turner Motorsport	Report
8	Road America	**(France) Mathieu Jaminet** **(United Kingdom) Nick Tandy**	(United Kingdom) Ben Hanley (United States) Ben Keating	**(Italy) Giacomo Altoè** **(Brazil) Daniel Serra**	(United States) Robby Foley (United States) Patrick Gallagher	Report
9	VIR	did not participate	did not participate	**(United States) #1 Paul Miller Racing**	(United States) #32 Korthoff/Preston Motorsports	Report
9	VIR	did not participate	did not participate	**(United States) Bryan Sellers** **(United States) Madison Snow**	(Canada) Mikaël Grenier (United States) Kenton Koch	Report
10	Indianapolis	**(United States) #24 BMW M Team RLL**	(France) #11 TDS Racing	**(United States) #77 AO Racing**	(United States) #120 Wright Motorsports	Report
10	Indianapolis	**(Austria) Philipp Eng** **(Finland) Jesse Krohn**	(Denmark) Mikkel Jensen (New Zealand) Hunter McElrea (United States) Steven Thomas	**(Denmark) Michael Christensen** **(Germany) Laurin Heinrich**	(United States) Adam Adelson (Belgium) Jan Heylen (United States) Elliott Skeer	Report
11	Road Atlanta	**(United States) #01 Cadillac Racing**	(France) #11 TDS Racing	**(Italy) #19 Iron Lynx**	(United States) #34 Conquest Racing	Report
11	Road Atlanta	**(France) Sébastien Bourdais** **(New Zealand) Scott Dixon** **(Netherlands) Renger van der Zande**	(Denmark) Mikkel Jensen (New Zealand) Hunter McElrea (United States) Steven Thomas	**(Italy) Mirko Bortolotti** **(South Africa) Jordan Pepper** **(France) Franck Perera**	(Spain) Albert Costa (United States) Manny Franco (Monaco) Cédric Sbirrazzuoli	Report

== Championship standings ==
=== Points systems ===
Championship points are awarded in each class at the finish of each event. Points are awarded based on finishing positions in qualifying and the race as shown in the chart below.

Position	1	2	3	4	5	6	7	8	9	10	11	12	13	14	15	16	17	18	19	20	21	22	23	24	25	26	27	28	29	30+
Qualifying	35	32	30	28	26	25	24	23	22	21	20	19	18	17	16	15	14	13	12	11	10	9	8	7	6	5	4	3	2	1
Race	350	320	300	280	260	250	240	230	220	210	200	190	180	170	160	150	140	130	120	110	100	90	80	70	60	50	40	30	20	10

Drivers points

Points are awarded in each class at the finish of each event.

Team points

Team points are calculated in exactly the same way as driver points, using the point distribution chart. Each car entered is considered its own "team" regardless if it is a single entry or part of a two-car team.

Manufacturer points

There are also a number of manufacturer championships which utilize the same season-long point distribution chart. The manufacturer championships recognized by IMSA are as follows:

Grand Touring Prototype (GTP): Engine & bodywork manufacturer
GT Daytona Pro (GTD Pro): Car manufacturer
GT Daytona (GTD): Car manufacturer

Each manufacturer receives finishing points for its highest finishing car in each class. The positions of subsequent finishing cars from the same manufacturer are not taken into consideration, and all other manufacturers move up in the order.

Example: Manufacturer A finishes 1st and 2nd at an event, and Manufacturer B finishes 3rd. Manufacturer A receives 35 first-place points while Manufacturer B would earn 32 second-place points.

Michelin Endurance Cup

The points system for the Michelin Endurance Cup is different from the normal points system. Points are awarded on a 5–4–3–2 basis for drivers, teams and manufacturers. The first finishing position at each interval earns five points, four points for second position, three points for third, with two points awarded for fourth and each subsequent finishing position.

Position	1	2	3	Other Classified
Race	5	4	3	2

At the Rolex 24 at Daytona, points are awarded at 6 hours, 12 hours, 18 hours and at the finish. At the Sebring 12 hours, points are awarded at 4 hours, 8 hours and at the finish. At the Watkins Glen 6 hours and Indianapolis 6 hours, points are awarded at 3 hours and at the finish. At the Petit Le Mans (10 hours), points are awarded at 4 hours, 8 hours and at the finish.

Like the season-long team championship, Michelin Endurance Cup team points are awarded for each car and drivers get points in any car that they drive, in which they are entered for points. The manufacturer points go to the highest placed car from that manufacturer (the others from that manufacturer not being counted), just like the season-long manufacturer championship.

For example: in any particular segment manufacturer A finishes 1st and 2nd and manufacturer B finishes 3rd. Manufacturer A only receives first-place points for that segment. Manufacturer B receives the second-place points.

=== Drivers' Championships ===
==== Standings: Grand Touring Prototype (GTP) ====
Pos.	Drivers	DAY	SEB	LBH	LGA	DET	WGL	ELK	IMS	ATL	Points	MEC
1	(United States) Dane Cameron (Brazil) Felipe Nasr	1	3	3	3	4	1	2	7	3	2982	50
2	(France) Mathieu Jaminet (United Kingdom) Nick Tandy	4	9	4	1	**2**	3	1	10	2	2869	41
3	(France) Sébastien Bourdais (Netherlands) Renger van der Zande	10	2	1	**5**	3	2	9	**6**	1	2864	42
4	(United Kingdom) Jack Aitken (Brazil) Pipo Derani	**2**	**10**	**2**	2	6	8	4	9	**5**	2687	38
5	(Switzerland) Louis Delétraz (United States) Jordan Taylor	3	1	10	4	5	**4**	8	11	7	2603	34
6	(Portugal) Filipe Albuquerque (United States) Ricky Taylor	9	5	8	6	1	10	**3**	4	9	2550	32
7	(Austria) Philipp Eng (Finland) Jesse Krohn	8	6	6	9	7	5	7	1	4	2537	31
8	(United States) Connor De Phillippi (United Kingdom) Nick Yelloly	7	4	9	7	10	6	10	2	10	2392	36
9	(Italy) Gianmaria Bruni	5	8	5	10	9	7	5	5	6	2372	28
10	(Netherlands) Tijmen van der Helm (United Kingdom) Richard Westbrook	6	11	7	8	8	9	6	3	11	2331	32
11	(Netherlands) Bent Viscaal				10	9	7	5	5	6	1577	14
12	(United Kingdom) Tom Blomqvist	**2**	**10**				8		9	**5**	1403	38
13	(United Kingdom) Phil Hanson	6	11				9		3	11	1290	32
14	(Belgium) Alessio Picariello	5	8						5	6	1067	24
15	(Australia) Matt Campbell	1	3							3	1038	36
16	(Italy) Matteo Cairoli (Italy) Andrea Caldarelli		7				11		8	8	986	20
17	(New Zealand) Scott Dixon	10	2							1	972	29
18	(United States) Colton Herta	3	1							7	970	25
19	(Brazil) Augusto Farfus	8	6							4	833	20
20	(Belgium) Maxime Martin	7	4							10	810	24
21	(New Zealand) Brendon Hartley	9	5							9	771	24
22	(France) Romain Grosjean		7						8	8	764	16
23	(France) Kévin Estre	4								2	647	22
24	(United States) Josef Newgarden	1									380	16
25	(United Kingdom) Jenson Button	3									326	9
26	(Belgium) Laurens Vanthoor	4									304	11
27	(Germany) Mike Rockenfeller			5							281	0
28	(United States) Ben Keating	6									272	8
29	(Germany) René Rast	7									268	9
30	(France) Romain Dumas (Switzerland) Neel Jani	5									260	8
31	(France) Julien Andlauer		8								254	6
32	(Belgium) Dries Vanthoor	8									253	8
33	(Sweden) Marcus Ericsson	9									245	8
34	(Spain) Álex Palou	10									242	9
35	(France) Frédéric Makowiecki		9								241	8
Pos.	Drivers	DAY	SEB	LBH	LGA	DET	WGL	ELK	IMS	ATL	Points	MEC

Colour	Result
Gold	Winner
Silver	Second place
Bronze	Third place
Green	Points classification
Blue	Non-points classification
Blue	Non-classified finish (NC)
Purple	Retired, not classified (Ret)
Red	Did not qualify (DNQ)
Red	Did not pre-qualify (DNPQ)
Black	Disqualified (DSQ)
White	Did not start (DNS)
White	Withdrew (WD)
White	Race cancelled (C)
Blank	Did not practice (DNP)
Blank	Did not arrive (DNA)
Blank	Excluded (EX)

**Bold** - Pole position
Italics - Fastest lap

==== Standings: Le Mans Prototype 2 (LMP2) ====
Pos.	Drivers	DAY	SEB	WGL	MOS	ELK	IMS	ATL	Points	MEC
1	(United States) Nick Boulle (France) Tom Dillmann	4	6	3	1	7	**2**	4	2227	42
2	(Brazil) Felipe Fraga (United States) Gar Robinson	3	5	2	2	10	5	2	2166	38
3	(United Kingdom) Ryan Dalziel	1	1	12	11	4	3	3	2118	40
4	(United States) Steven Thomas	13	2	9	3	12	1	1	2104	49
5	(United Kingdom) Ben Hanley (United States) Ben Keating	**6**	10	8	4	1	9	**10**	1962	30
6	(United States) P. J. Hyett	8	**11**	**7**	**8**	**3**	4	7	1942	28
7	(United States) Dan Goldburg	11	3	5	5	11	7	9	1884	31
8	(Argentina) Luis Pérez Companc	12	13	1	9	5	6	6	1860	36
9	(Canada) John Farano	5	12	6	6	6	8	5	1833	28
10	(Denmark) Mikkel Jensen	13	2	9		12	1	1	1778	49
11	(Denmark) Dennis Andersen (United States) Seth Lucas	10	8	4	12	9	10	8	1725	31
12	(France) Paul-Loup Chatin	8	**11**	**7**		**3**	4	7	1677	28
13	(Denmark) Nicklas Nielsen	12	13	1		5	6	6	1620	36
14	(United States) Dwight Merriman (United States) Connor Zilisch	1	1	12			3	3	1597	40
15	(United Kingdom) Paul di Resta	11	3	5		11	7	9	1592	31
16	(Australia) Josh Burdon	3	5	2			5	2	1587	38
17	(Poland) Jakub Śmiechowski	4	6	3			**2**	4	1581	42
18	(New Zealand) Hunter McElrea	13	2	9			1	1	1563	49
19	(United States) Bijoy Garg	11	3	5			7	9	1362	31
20	(United States) Scott Huffaker	10		4	3		10	8	1348	25
21	(Australia) Matthew Brabham	8	**11**	**7**			4	7	1342	28
22	(Chile) Nico Pino	**6**	10	8			9	**10**	1276	30
23	(Portugal) João Barbosa	9	4	11	10	8			1240	18
24	(United States) Colin Braun (United States) George Kurtz	2	9	13	7				1065	28
25	(France) Lilou Wadoux	12	13	1				6	1059	32
26	(United States) Michael Dinan	5	12	6			8		1007	22
27	(Republic of Ireland) Charlie Eastwood		12	6		6	8		1001	14
28	(United States) Lance Willsey	9	4	11	10				987	18
29	(United Kingdom) Toby Sowery	2	9	13					800	28
30	(United Kingdom) Jonny Edgar	9	4	11					755	18
31	(Denmark) Malthe Jakobsen	2	7						612	24
32	(Mexico) Sebastián Álvarez	7						5	543	14
33	(United Kingdom) Stuart Wiltshire				11	4			521	0
34	(United States) Eric Lux	7		10					492	12
35	(Sweden) Rasmus Lindh		7	10					492	11
36	(Germany) Laurents Hörr	10	8						483	14
37	(Denmark) Christian Rasmussen	1							370	15
38	(Australia) Scott Andrews (United States) Gerry Kraut					2			341	0
39	(Brazil) Felipe Massa	3							328	11
40	(Brazil) Pietro Fittipaldi	4							312	13
41	(Portugal) Filipe Albuquerque				5				292	0
42	(Mexico) Pato O'Ward	**6**							285	8
43	(Denmark) Frederik Vesti							5	281	6
44	(Austria) Ferdinand Habsburg (New Zealand) Scott McLaughlin	5							278	8
45	(United States) Dylan Murry						6		275	4
46	(Netherlands) Renger van der Zande				6				273	0
47	(Switzerland) Louis Delétraz				**8**				265	0
48	(Australia) James Allen (Cayman Islands) Kyffin Simpson	7							262	8
49	(Sweden) Henrik Hedman		7						262	7
50	(United Kingdom) Alex Quinn	8							254	8
51	(Estonia) Tõnis Kasemets					8			253	0
52	(Brazil) Pipo Derani				9				240	0
53	(United States) Nolan Siegel	9							239	8
54	(Argentina) Nicolás Varrone			10					230	4
55	(Sweden) Felix Rosenqvist	11							226	8
56	(France) Matthieu Vaxivière	12							211	8
57	(France) Charles Milesi	13							205	8
Pos.	Drivers	DAY	SEB	WGL	MOS	ELK	IMS	ATL	Points	MEC

==== Standings: GT Daytona Pro (GTD Pro) ====
Pos.	Drivers	DAY	SEB	LGA	DET	WGL	MOS	ELK	VIR	IMS	ATL	Points	MEC
1	(Germany) Laurin Heinrich	**2**	9	1	1	6	3	4	7	1	**11**	3122	38
2	(United Kingdom) Ross Gunn	4	5	6	3	1	5	3	3	5	3	3118	36
3	(Spain) Antonio García (United Kingdom) Alexander Sims	5	10	5	**10**	3	**1**	5	9	3	5	2934	36
4	(United States) Bryan Sellers (United States) Madison Snow	3	4	7	5	8	8	2	**1**	8	7	2929	43
5	(United Kingdom) Ben Barnicoat (United Kingdom) Jack Hawksworth	11	**1**	4	2	4	9	9	6	4	13	2859	31
6	(Germany) Mike Rockenfeller (United Kingdom) Harry Tincknell	6	7	9	11	5	4	10	2	2	8	2783	36
7	(United Kingdom) Oliver Jarvis (Germany) Marvin Kirchhöfer	10	12	2	8	2	6	7	5	10	9	2689	30
8	(Netherlands) Nicky Catsburg (United States) Tommy Milner	8	11	**3**	9	7	2	**6**	8	**11**	12	2674	33
9	(Spain) Alex Riberas	4	5		3	1		3	3	5	3	2558	36
10	(United States) Joey Hand (Germany) Dirk Müller	9	8	8	7	10	7	8	4	12	6	2555	29
11	(Brazil) Daniel Serra	1	2		7	**11**		1		9	2	2186	41
12	(United Kingdom) Sebastian Priaulx	**2**	9	1	1	6	3					1955	23
13	(Germany) Mario Farnbacher	4	5	6			5			6	4	1729	24
14	(Italy) Davide Rigon	1	2			**11**				9	2	1540	41
15	(United States) Neil Verhagen	3	4			8				8	7	1400	43
16	(South Africa) Jordan Pepper (France) Franck Perera	7	3			9					1	1211	35
17	(Denmark) Michael Christensen	**2**	9							1	11	1208	34
18	(Italy) Mirko Bortolotti	7	3								1	970	31
19	(United States) Kyle Kirkwood	11	**1**								13	817	23
20	(Spain) Daniel Juncadella	5	10								5	808	25
21	(Germany) Christopher Mies	6	7								8	786	22
22	(Belgium) Frédéric Vervisch	9	8								6	770	21
23	(United Kingdom) James Calado	1	2									722	24
24	(Italy) Alessandro Pier Guidi	1									2	714	24
25	(New Zealand) Earl Bamber	8	11								12	695	23
26	(Canada) James Hinchcliffe	10	12								9	691	20
27	(Canada) Roman De Angelis									6	3	604	15
28	(France) Julien Andlauer							4			11	536	6
29	(Italy) Matteo Cressoni (Italy) Claudio Schiavoni	12	6									484	14
30	(Australia) Kenny Habul	13								7		464	12
31	(Italy) Giacomo Altoè							1				380	0
32	(South Africa) Sheldon van der Linde	3										319	15
33	(Canada) Zacharie Robichon (Denmark) Marco Sørensen										4	303	6
34	(Canada) Parker Thompson (United States) Frankie Montecalvo				4							301	0
35	(Italy) Leonardo Pulcini		6									271	6
36	(Italy) Andrea Caldarelli	7										268	9
37	(Spain) Albert Costa				7							266	0
38	(Austria) Klaus Bachler								7			263	0
39	(Australia) Jordan Love (Australia) Chaz Mostert									7		263	4
40	(United States) Alexander Rossi	10										235	8
41	(United Kingdom) Mike Conway	11										232	8
42	(Monaco) Vincent Abril (France) Thomas Neubauer (Finland) Toni Vilander										10	229	6
43	(Italy) Matteo Cairoli (France) Romain Grosjean	12										213	8
44	(Germany) Luca Engstler (Germany) Maximilian Paul									13		202	4
45	(Germany) Maro Engel (Andorra) Jules Gounon (Germany) Luca Stolz	13										201	8
Pos.	Drivers	DAY	SEB	LGA	DET	WGL	MOS	ELK	VIR	IMS	ATL	Points	MEC

==== Standings: GT Daytona (GTD) ====
Pos.	Drivers	DAY	SEB	LBH	LGA	WGL	MOS	ELK	VIR	IMS	ATL	Points	MEC
1	(Switzerland) Philip Ellis (United States) Russell Ward	1	1	7	1	1	2	4	3	5	8	3266	41
2	(United States) Robby Foley (United States) Patrick Gallagher	14	6	2	2	5	4	1	4	2	9	3036	32
3	(Canada) Mikaël Grenier	5	21	3	4	11	8	**7**	1	**3**	19	2661	39
4	(Spain) Albert Costa (United States) Manny Franco	3	11	12	15	2	11	6	5	19	1	2577	35
5	(Canada) Misha Goikhberg (Italy) Loris Spinelli	16	5	11	8	14	9	14	2	4	2	2554	34
6	(Canada) Parker Thompson	**15**	13	**1**	9	**4**	**5**	11	9	22	3	2527	32
7	(United States) Frankie Montecalvo	**15**	13	15	9	**4**	**5**	11	9	22	3	2334	32
8	(Costa Rica) Danny Formal	17	15	8	**5**	12	6	15	11	10	5	2310	28
9	(United States) Brendan Iribe (Denmark) Frederik Schandorff	13	7	17	14	21	3	2	13	9	7	2308	40
10	(United Kingdom) Matt Bell (Canada) Orey Fidani	21	9	6	11	7	13	5	6	6	11	2288	28
11	(United States) Adam Adelson (United States) Elliott Skeer	7	3	16	3	19		13	8	1	16	2192	38
12	(United States) Sheena Monk	19	17	4	12	13	7	3	12	16	12	2175	28
13	(Denmark) Anders Fjordbach (China) Kerong Li	12	12	13	13	8	10	10	10	12	15	2129	28
14	(Canada) Kyle Marcelli	17	15	8	**5**	12	6		11	10	5	2125	28
15	(Italy) Giammarco Levorato (United States) Corey Lewis	20	16	5	7	17	12	8	**7**	17	17	2072	29
16	(United Kingdom) Stevan McAleer	19		4	12	13	7	3	12	16	12	2016	22
17	(United States) Mike Skeen	5	21	3	4	11	8			**3**	19	2004	39
18	(Canada) Roman De Angelis	22	4	14	6	16	1	9	14			1874	20
19	(United States) Spencer Pumpelly	23	10	14	6	3	1			11	18	1853	29
20	(United States) Kenton Koch	5	21			11		**7**	1	**3**	19	1773	39
21	(Netherlands) Indy Dontje	1	1			1				5	8	1651	41
22	(Monaco) Cédric Sbirrazzuoli	3	11			2				19	1	1405	35
23	(United States) Jarett Andretti (Colombia) Gabby Chaves	9	8	9	10	10				14		1357	22
24	(United States) Jake Walker	14	6			5				2	9	1346	32
25	(United States) Onofrio Triarsi	4	14			9		12		21	4	1344	34
26	(Canada) Devlin DeFrancesco	16	5			14				4	2	1305	34
27	(Belgium) Jan Heylen	7	3			19				1	16	1244	38
28	(Italy) Alessio Rovera	4	14			9		12			4	1225	30
29	(Italy) Antonio Fuoco (Italy) Roberto Lacorte (Italy) Giorgio Sernagiotto	10	**2**			18				7	14	1183	31
30	(France) François Hériau (United Kingdom) Simon Mann (Spain) Miguel Molina	2	19			6				20	6	1154	30
31	(United States) Aaron Telitz	**15**	13			**4**				22	3	1135	32
32	(United States) Charlie Scardina	4	14			9				21	4	1124	34
33	(United Kingdom) Ollie Millroy	13	7			21				9	7	1086	40
34	(United States) Graham Doyle	17	15			12				10	5	1075	28
35	(Germany) Lars Kern	21	9			7				6	11	1062	28
36	(Canada) Zacharie Robichon	22	4			16		9	14			1016	20
37	(United States) Andy Lally (United States) John Potter	23	10			3				11	18	995	29
38	(Angola) Rui Andrade (Australia) Scott Andrews (Turkey) Salih Yoluç	8	18			20				15	**10**	945	30
39	(Belgium) Sarah Bovy (Switzerland) Rahel Frey (Denmark) Michelle Gatting	6	20			15				18	13	918	28
40	(Canada) Scott Hargrove	9	8			10				14		889	22
41	(Colombia) Tatiana Calderón	19	17			13				16	12	883	28
42	(Austria) Klaus Bachler	12	12			8					15	842	24
43	(United States) Ryan Hardwick	20	16			17					17	616	24
44	(United Kingdom) Ian James	22	4			16						566	20
45	(Italy) Riccardo Agostini	4								21		422	15
46	(United Kingdom) Ben Barnicoat			**1**								385	0
47	(Canada) Daniel Morad	1										364	12
48	(United Kingdom) Sandy Mitchell	16						15				361	8
49	(Japan) Kei Cozzolino	2										340	10
50	(Italy) Alessandro Balzan	3										325	9
51	(United Kingdom) Katherine Legge	19	17									309	14
52	(Germany) Maximilian Götz	5										273	13
53	(France) Doriane Pin	6										268	8
54	(France) Frédéric Makowiecki	7										252	8
55	(Netherlands) Kay van Berlo (United States) Riley Dickinson (United States) Jake Pedersen									8		251	4
56	(Canada) Anthony Mantella (United States) Thomas Merrill (Argentina) Nicolás Varrone	18	22									251	14
57	(United Kingdom) Adam Christodoulou	8										241	10
58	(Austria) Thomas Preining	9										239	8
59	(Italy) Eddie Cheever III	10										234	9
60	(United States) Andy Lee (United States) Elias Sabo			10								225	0
61	(Netherlands) Larry ten Voorde	12										222	8
62	(New Zealand) Brendon Leitch									12		210	4
63	(France) Julien Andlauer (United States) David Brule (United States) Trent Hindman (United States) Alec Udell	11										208	8
64	(United Kingdom) Tom Gamble	13										201	13
65	(Japan) Ritomo Miyata	**15**										195	8
66	(United Kingdom) Jack Hawksworth			15								192	0
67	(Sweden) Henrik Hedman (Sweden) Rasmus Lindh (Finland) Toni Vilander									13		190	4
68	(Germany) Jens Klingmann	14										185	9
69	(United Kingdom) Ben Barker									17		172	5
70	(United States) Ashton Harrison	17										168	8
71	(Republic of Ireland) Charlie Eastwood	18										152	8
72	(Norway) Dennis Olsen	20										126	8
73	(United Kingdom) Alex Lynn	21										117	8
74	(Denmark) Marco Sørensen	22										99	8
75	(Denmark) Nicki Thiim	23										90	8
Pos.	Drivers	DAY	SEB	LBH	LGA	WGL	MOS	ELK	VIR	IMS	ATL	Points	MEC

=== Teams' Championships ===
==== Standings: Grand Touring Prototype (GTP) ====
Pos.	Team	Car	DAY	SEB	LBH	LGA	DET	WGL	ELK	IMS	ATL	Points	MEC
1	#7 Porsche Penske Motorsport	Porsche 963	1	3	3	3	4	1	2	7	3	2982	50
2	#6 Porsche Penske Motorsport	Porsche 963	4	9	4	1	**2**	3	1	10	2	2869	41
3	#01 Cadillac Racing	Cadillac V-Series.R	10	2	1	**5**	3	2	9	**6**	1	2864	42
4	#31 Whelen Cadillac Racing	Cadillac V-Series.R	**2**	**10**	**2**	2	6	8	4	9	**5**	2687	38
5	#40 Wayne Taylor Racing with Andretti	Acura ARX-06	3	1	10	4	5	**4**	8	11	7	2603	34
6	#10 Wayne Taylor Racing with Andretti	Acura ARX-06	9	5	8	6	1	10	**3**	4	9	2550	32
7	#24 BMW M Team RLL	BMW M Hybrid V8	8	6	6	9	7	5	7	1	4	2537	31
8	#25 BMW M Team RLL	BMW M Hybrid V8	7	4	9	7	10	6	10	2	10	2392	36
9	#5 Proton Competition Mustang Sampling	Porsche 963	5	8	5	10	9	7	5	5	6	2372	28
10	#85 JDC–Miller MotorSports	Porsche 963	6	11	7	8	8	9	6	3	11	2331	32
11	#63 Lamborghini – Iron Lynx	Lamborghini SC63		7				11		8	8	986	20
Pos.	Team	Car	DAY	SEB	LBH	LGA	DET	WGL	ELK	IMS	ATL	Points	MEC

==== Standings: Le Mans Prototype 2 (LMP2) ====
Pos.	Team	Car	DAY	SEB	WGL	MOS	ELK	IMS	ATL	Points	MEC
1	#52 Inter Europol by PR1/Mathiasen Motorsports	Oreca 07	4	6	3	1	7	**2**	4	2227	42
2	#74 Riley	Oreca 07	3	5	2	2	10	5	2	2166	38
3	#18 Era Motorsport	Oreca 07	1	1	12	11	4	3	3	2118	40
4	#11 TDS Racing	Oreca 07	13	2	9	3	12	1	1	2104	49
5	#2 United Autosports USA	Oreca 07	**6**	10	8	4	1	9	**10**	1962	30
6	#99 AO Racing	Oreca 07	8	**11**	**7**	**8**	**3**	4	7	1942	28
7	#22 United Autosports USA	Oreca 07	11	3	5	5	11	7	9	1884	31
8	#88 Richard Mille AF Corse	Oreca 07	12	13	1	9	5	6	6	1860	36
9	#8 Tower Motorsports	Oreca 07	5	12	6	6	6	8	5	1833	28
10	#20 MDK by High Class Racing	Oreca 07	10	8	4	12	9	10	8	1725	31
11	#33 Sean Creech Motorsport	Ligier JS P217	9	4	11	10	8			1240	18
12	#04 CrowdStrike Racing by APR	Oreca 07	2	9	13	7				1065	28
13	#81 DragonSpeed	Oreca 07	7	7	10					754	19
14	#79 JDC–Miller MotorSports	Oreca 07					2			341	0
Pos.	Team	Car	DAY	SEB	WGL	MOS	ELK	IMS	ATL	Points	MEC

==== Standings: GT Daytona Pro (GTD Pro) ====
Pos.	Team	Car	DAY	SEB	LGA	DET	WGL	MOS	ELK	VIR	IMS	ATL	Points	MEC
1	#77 AO Racing	Porsche 911 GT3 R (992)	**2**	9	1	1	6	3	4	7	1	**11**	3122	38
2	#23 Heart of Racing Team	Aston Martin Vantage AMR GT3 Evo	4	5	6	3	1	5	3	3	5	3	3118	36
3	#3 Corvette Racing by Pratt Miller Motorsports	Chevrolet Corvette Z06 GT3.R	5	10	5	**10**	3	**1**	5	9	3	5	2934	36
4	#1 Paul Miller Racing	BMW M4 GT3	3	4	7	5	8	8	2	**1**	8	7	2929	43
5	#14 Vasser Sullivan	Lexus RC F GT3	11	**1**	4	2	4	9	9	6	4	13	2859	31
6	#64 Ford Multimatic Motorsports	Ford Mustang GT3	6	7	9	11	5	4	10	2	2	8	2783	36
7	#9 Pfaff Motorsports	McLaren 720S GT3 Evo	10	12	2	8	2	6	7	5	10	9	2689	30
8	#4 Corvette Racing by Pratt Miller Motorsports	Chevrolet Corvette Z06 GT3.R	8	11	**3**	9	7	2	**6**	8	**11**	12	2674	33
9	#65 Ford Multimatic Motorsports	Ford Mustang GT3	9	8	8	6	10	7	8	4	12	6	2555	29
10	#62 Risi Competizione	Ferrari 296 GT3	1	2			**11**				9	2	1540	41
11	#19 Iron Lynx	Lamborghini Huracán GT3 Evo 2	7	3			9				13	1	1413	39
12	#35 Conquest Racing	Ferrari 296 GT3				7			1				646	0
13	#027 Heart of Racing Team	Aston Martin Vantage AMR GT3 Evo									6	4	577	10
14	#60 Iron Lynx	Lamborghini Huracán GT3 Evo 2	12	6									484	14
15	#75 SunEnergy1 Racing	Mercedes-AMG GT3 Evo	13								7		464	12
16	#15 Vasser Sullivan	Lexus RC F GT3				4							301	0
17	#082 DragonSpeed	Ferrari 296 GT3										10	229	6
Pos.	Team	Car	DAY	SEB	LGA	DET	WGL	MOS	ELK	VIR	IMS	ATL	Points	MEC

==== Standings: GT Daytona (GTD) ====
Pos.	Team	Car	DAY	SEB	LBH	LGA	WGL	MOS	ELK	VIR	IMS	ATL	Points	MEC
1	#57 Winward Racing	Mercedes-AMG GT3 Evo	1	1	7	1	1	2	4	3	5	8	3266	41
2	#96 Turner Motorsport	BMW M4 GT3	14	6	2	2	5	4	1	4	2	9	3036	32
3	#32 Korthoff/Preston Motorsports	Mercedes-AMG GT3 Evo	5	21	3	4	11	8	**7**	1	**3**	19	2661	39
4	#34 Conquest Racing	Ferrari 296 GT3	3	11	12	15	2	11	6	5	19	1	2577	35
5	#78 Forte Racing	Lamborghini Huracán GT3 Evo 2	16	5	11	8	14	9	14	2	4	2	2554	34
6	#12 Vasser Sullivan	Lexus RC F GT3	**15**	13	15	9	**4**	**5**	11	9	22	3	2334	32
7	#45 Wayne Taylor Racing with Andretti	Lamborghini Huracán GT3 Evo 2	17	15	8	**5**	12	6	15	11	10	5	2310	28
8	#70 Inception Racing	McLaren 720S GT3 Evo 8 Ferrari 296 GT3 2	13	7	17	14	21	3	2	13	9	7	2308	40
9	#13 AWA	Chevrolet Corvette Z06 GT3.R	21	9	6	11	7	13	5	6	6	11	2288	28
10	#120 Wright Motorsports	Porsche 911 GT3 R (992)	7	3	16	3	19		13	8	1	16	2192	38
11	#66 Gradient Racing	Acura NSX GT3 Evo22	19	17	4	12	13	7	3	12	16	12	2175	28
12	#86 MDK Motorsports	Porsche 911 GT3 R (992)	12	12	13	13	8	10	10	10	12	15	2129	28
13	#55 Proton Competition	Ford Mustang GT3	20	16	5	7	17	12	8	**7**	17	17	2072	29
14	#27 Heart of Racing Team	Aston Martin Vantage AMR GT3 Evo	22	4	14	6	16	1	9	14			1874	20
15	#43 Andretti Motorsports	Porsche 911 GT3 R (992)	9	8	9	10	10				14		1357	22
16	#023 Triarsi Competizione	Ferrari 296 GT3	4	14			9		12		21	4	1344	34
17	#47 Cetilar Racing	Ferrari 296 GT3	10	**2**			18				7	14	1183	31
18	#21 AF Corse	Ferrari 296 GT3	2	19			6				20	6	1154	30
19	#44 Magnus Racing	Aston Martin Vantage AMR GT3 Evo	23	10			3				11	18	995	29
20	#80 Lone Star Racing	Mercedes-AMG GT3 Evo	8	18			20				15	**10**	945	30
21	#83 Iron Dames	Lamborghini Huracán GT3 Evo 2	6	20			15				18	13	918	28
22	#89 Vasser Sullivan	Lexus RC F GT3			**1**								385	0
23	#90 Kellymoss with Riley	Porsche 911 GT3 R (992)									8		251	4
24	#17 AWA	Chevrolet Corvette Z06 GT3.R	18	22									251	14
25	#28 Flying Lizard Motorsports	Aston Martin Vantage AMR GT3 Evo			10								225	0
26	#92 Kellymoss with Riley	Porsche 911 GT3 R (992)	11										208	8
27	#56 DragonSpeed	Ferrari 296 GT3									13		190	4
Pos.	Team	Car	DAY	SEB	LBH	LGA	WGL	MOS	ELK	VIR	IMS	ATL	Points	MEC

=== Manufacturers' Championships ===
==== Standings: Grand Touring Prototype (GTP) ====
Pos.	Manufacturer	DAY	SEB	LBH	LGA	DET	WGL	ELK	IMS	ATL	Points	MEC
1	(Germany) Porsche	1	3	3	1	**2**	1	1	3	2	3257	60
2	(United States) Cadillac	**2**	**2**	**1**	**2**	3	2	4	**6**	1	3166	51
3	(Japan) Acura	3	1	8	4	1	**4**	**3**	4	6	3056	43
4	(Germany) BMW	7	4	6	7	7	5	7	1	4	2896	41
5	(Italy) Lamborghini		7				11		8	7	1144	21
Pos.	Manufacturer	DAY	SEB	LBH	LGA	DET	WGL	ELK	IMS	ATL	Points	MEC

==== Standings: GT Daytona Pro (GTD Pro) ====
Pos.	Manufacturer	DAY	SEB	LGA	DET	WGL	MOS	ELK	VIR	IMS	ATL	Points	MEC
1	(Germany) Porsche	**2**	9	1	1	6	3	4	7	1	**11**	3215	38
2	(United Kingdom) Aston Martin	4	5	6	3	1	5	3	3	5	3	3158	36
3	(United States) Chevrolet	5	10	**3**	**9**	3	**1**	**5**	8	**3**	5	3073	40
4	(Japan) Lexus	11	**1**	4	2	4	9	9	6	4	13	2973	31
5	(United States) Ford	6	7	8	6	5	4	8	2	2	6	2969	37
6	(United Kingdom) McLaren	10	12	2	8	2	6	7	5	10	9	2832	30
7	(Germany) BMW	3	4	7	5	8	8	2	**1**	8	7	2722	29
8	(Italy) Ferrari	1	2		7	**11**		1		9	2	1885	26
9	(Italy) Lamborghini	7	3			9				13	1	1458	39
10	(Germany) Mercedes-AMG	13								7		508	12
Pos.	Manufacturer	DAY	SEB	LGA	DET	WGL	MOS	ELK	VIR	IMS	ATL	Points	MEC

==== Standings: GT Daytona (GTD) ====
Pos.	Manufacturer	DAY	SEB	LBH	LGA	WGL	MOS	ELK	VIR	IMS	ATL	Points	MEC
1	(Germany) Mercedes-AMG	1	1	3	1	1	2	**4**	1	**3**	**8**	3532	53
2	(Italy) Lamborghini	6	5	8	**5**	12	6	14	2	4	2	2958	36
3	(Germany) BMW	14	6	2	2	5	4	1	4	2	9	2938	23
4	(Germany) Porsche	7	3	9	3	8	10	10	8	1	15	2862	38
5	(Japan) Lexus	**15**	13	**1**	9	**4**	**5**	11	9	22	3	2829	32
6	(United Kingdom) Aston Martin	22	4	10	6	3	1	9	14	11	18	2751	31
7	(Italy) Ferrari	2	**2**	12	15	2	11	6	5	7	1	2674	32
8	(United States) Chevrolet	18	9	6	11	7	13	5	6	6	11	2610	28
9	(Japan) Acura	19	17	4	12	13	7	3	12	16	12	2601	29
10	(United States) Ford	20	16	5	7	17	12	8	**7**	17	17	2538	29
11	(United Kingdom) McLaren	13	7	17	14	21	3	2	13			2136	28
Pos.	Manufacturer	DAY	SEB	LBH	LGA	WGL	MOS	ELK	VIR	IMS	ATL	Points	MEC
