= 2024 Chevrolet Detroit Sports Car Classic =

Fifth round of the 2024 IMSA SportsCar Championship season

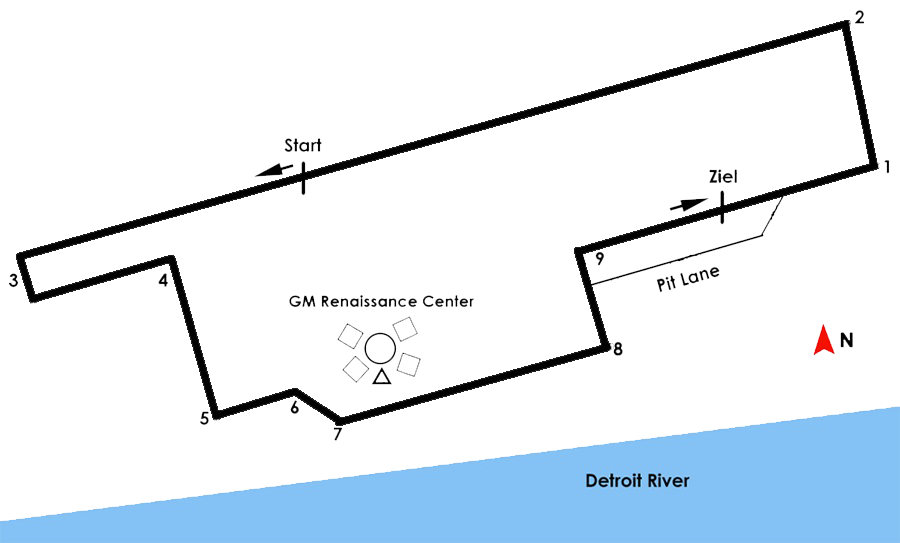
The layout of the Detroit street circuit, where the race was held.

The 2024 Chevrolet Detroit Sports Car Classic was a sports car race held at the Detroit street circuit in Detroit, Michigan, on June 1, 2024. It was the fifth round of the 2024 IMSA SportsCar Championship.

== Background ==
=== Preview ===
International Motor Sports Association (IMSA) president John Doonan confirmed the race was part of the 2024 IMSA SportsCar Championship (IMSA SCC) in August 2023. It was the ninth time the IMSA SCC hosted a race in Detroit, and the first time the race was hosted at the Detroit street circuit. The 2024 Detroit Grand Prix was the fifth of eleven scheduled sports car races of 2024 by IMSA. The race was held at the ten-turn 1.645 mi (2.647 km) Detroit street circuit on June 1, 2024.

=== Standings before the race ===
Prior to the race, the GTP Drivers' Championship was led by Dane Cameron and Felipe Nasr with 1357 points, 50 ahead of second-placed Jack Aitken and Pipo Derani. Sébastien Bourdais and Renger van der Zande sat 88 points behind Cameron and Nasr in third place. Laurin Heinrich and Sebastian Priaulx were on top in the GTD Pro Drivers' Championship with 981 points, 56 ahead of Ben Barnicoat and Jack Hawksworth in second. Bryan Sellers and Madison Snow sat a further 37 points behind in third place. Cadillac and Porsche were leading their respective Manufacturers' Championships, whilst Porsche Penske Motorsport and AO Racing were leading their Teams' Championships.

== Entry list ==
The entry list was revealed on May 22, 2024, and featured 21 entries: 10 entries in GTP, and 11 entries in GTD Pro. The GTP entry list stayed the same as it was in Laguna Seca, whilst GTD Pro saw the addition of two additional entries: the No. 15 Vasser Sullivan Lexus, and the No. 35 Conquest Racing Ferrari. The No. 15 Lexus was piloted by Frankie Montecalvo and Parker Thompson, whilst the No. 35 Ferrari was driven by Albert Costa and Daniel Serra. Furthermore, Alex Riberas returned in the No. 23 Heart of Racing Team Aston Martin, after being replaced by Mario Farnbacher in the previous round.

No.	Entrant	Car	Driver 1	Driver 2
GTP (Grand Touring Prototype) (10 entries)
01	(United States) Cadillac Racing	Cadillac V-Series.R	(France) Sébastien Bourdais	(Netherlands) Renger van der Zande
5	(Germany) Proton Competition Mustang Sampling	Porsche 963	(Italy) Gianmaria Bruni	(Netherlands) Bent Viscaal
6	(Germany) Porsche Penske Motorsport	Porsche 963	(France) Mathieu Jaminet	(United Kingdom) Nick Tandy
7	(Germany) Porsche Penske Motorsport	Porsche 963	(United States) Dane Cameron	(Brazil) Felipe Nasr
10	(United States) Wayne Taylor Racing with Andretti	Acura ARX-06	(Portugal) Filipe Albuquerque	(United States) Ricky Taylor
24	(United States) BMW M Team RLL	BMW M Hybrid V8	(Austria) Philipp Eng	(Finland) Jesse Krohn
25	(United States) BMW M Team RLL	BMW M Hybrid V8	(United States) Connor De Phillippi	(United Kingdom) Nick Yelloly
31	(United States) Whelen Cadillac Racing	Cadillac V-Series.R	(United Kingdom) Jack Aitken	(Brazil) Pipo Derani
40	(United States) Wayne Taylor Racing with Andretti	Acura ARX-06	(Switzerland) Louis Delétraz	(United States) Jordan Taylor
85	(United States) JDC–Miller MotorSports	Porsche 963	(Netherlands) Tijmen van der Helm	(United Kingdom) Richard Westbrook
GTD Pro (GT Daytona Pro) (11 entries)
1	(United States) Paul Miller Racing	BMW M4 GT3	(United States) Bryan Sellers	(United States) Madison Snow
3	(United States) Corvette Racing by Pratt Miller Motorsports	Chevrolet Corvette Z06 GT3.R	(Spain) Antonio García	(United Kingdom) Alexander Sims
4	(United States) Corvette Racing by Pratt Miller Motorsports	Chevrolet Corvette Z06 GT3.R	(Netherlands) Nicky Catsburg	(United States) Tommy Milner
9	(Canada) Pfaff Motorsports	McLaren 720S GT3 Evo	(United Kingdom) Oliver Jarvis	(Germany) Marvin Kirchhöfer
14	(United States) Vasser Sullivan	Lexus RC F GT3	(United Kingdom) Ben Barnicoat	(United Kingdom) Jack Hawksworth
15	(United States) Vasser Sullivan	Lexus RC F GT3	(United States) Frankie Montecalvo	(Canada) Parker Thompson
23	(United States) Heart of Racing Team	Aston Martin Vantage AMR GT3 Evo	(United Kingdom) Ross Gunn	(Spain) Alex Riberas
35	(United States) Conquest Racing	Ferrari 296 GT3	(Spain) Albert Costa	(Brazil) Daniel Serra
64	(Canada) Ford Multimatic Motorsports	Ford Mustang GT3	(Germany) Mike Rockenfeller	(United Kingdom) Harry Tincknell
65	(Canada) Ford Multimatic Motorsports	Ford Mustang GT3	(United States) Joey Hand	(Germany) Dirk Müller
77	(United States) AO Racing	Porsche 911 GT3 R (992)	(Germany) Laurin Heinrich	(United Kingdom) Sebastian Priaulx

== Practice ==
There were two practice sessions preceding the start of the race on Saturday, one on Friday morning and one on Friday afternoon. The first session lasted 90 minutes on Friday morning while the second session on Friday afternoon lasted 2 hours.

== Qualifying ==
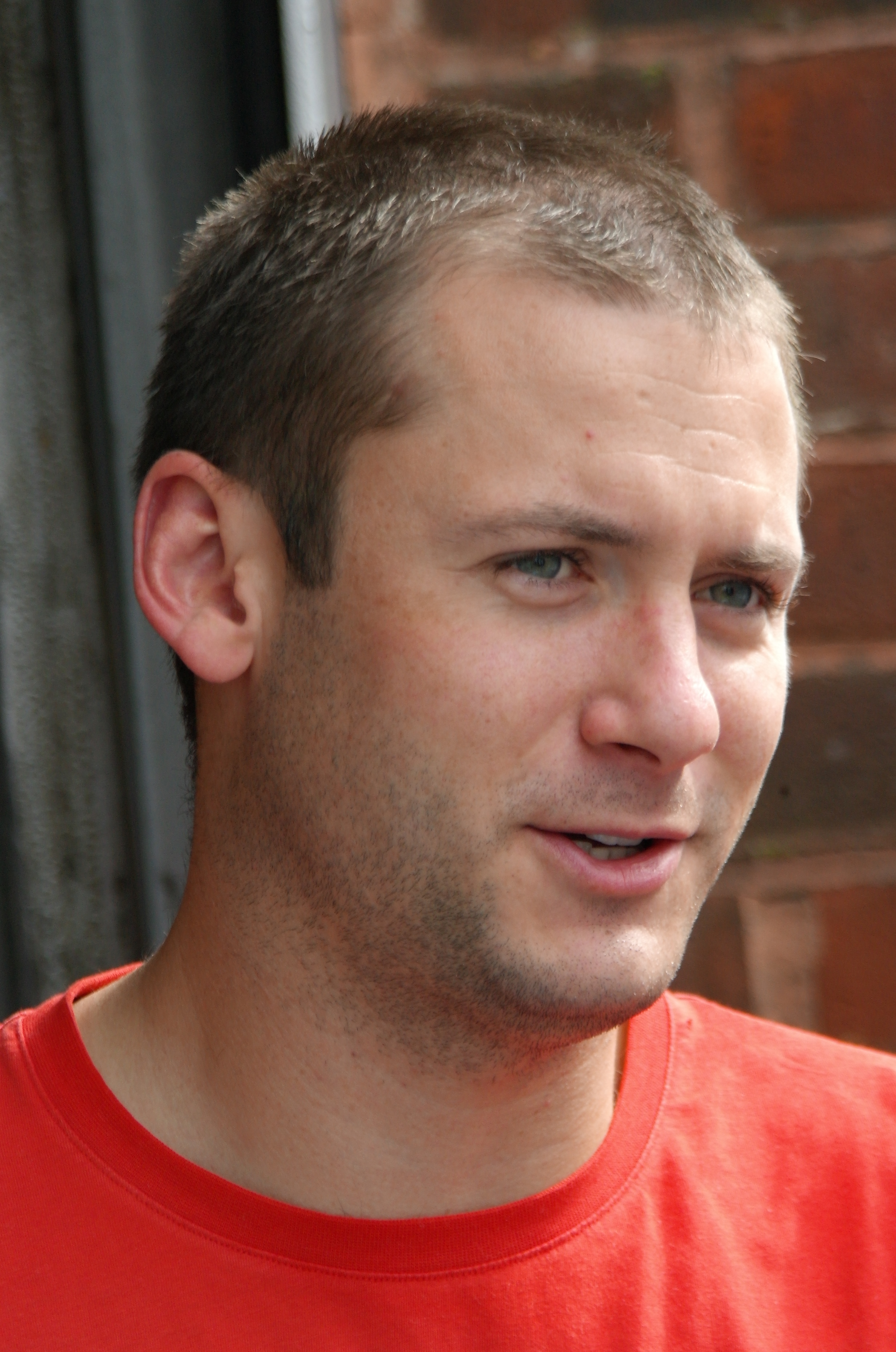
Nick Tandy (pictured in 2014) clinched Porsche Penske Motorsport's first pole position of the season.

Friday's afternoon qualifying was broken into two sessions, with one session for the GTP and GTD Pro classes, which lasted 15 minutes each. The rules dictated that all teams nominated a driver to qualify their cars. The competitors' fastest lap times determined the starting order. IMSA then arranged the grid to put GTPs ahead of the GTD Pro cars.

=== Qualifying results ===
Pole positions in each class are indicated in bold and with ‡.

Pos.	Class	No.	Entry	Driver	Time	Gap	Grid
1	**GTP**	**6**	**(Germany) Porsche Penske Motorsport**	**(United Kingdom) Nick Tandy**	**1:05.390**	—	1‡
2	GTP	7	(Germany) Porsche Penske Motorsport	(United States) Dane Cameron	1:05.514	+0.124	2
3	GTP	01	(United States) Cadillac Racing	(France) Sébastien Bourdais	1:05.762	+0.372	3
4	GTP	10	(United States) Wayne Taylor Racing with Andretti	(Portugal) Filipe Albuquerque	1:05.767	+0.377	4
5	GTP	40	(United States) Wayne Taylor Racing with Andretti	(United States) Jordan Taylor	1:05.901	+0.511	5
6	GTP	24	(United States) BMW M Team RLL	(Austria) Philipp Eng	1:06.001	+0.611	6
7	GTP	5	(Germany) Proton Competition Mustang Sampling	(Netherlands) Bent Viscaal	1:06.326	+0.936	7
8	GTP	25	(United States) BMW M Team RLL	(United Kingdom) Nick Yelloly	1:06.425	+1.035	8
9	GTP	85	(United States) JDC–Miller MotorSports	(Netherlands) Tijmen van der Helm	1:06.657	+1.267	9
10	GTP	31	(United States) Whelen Cadillac Racing	(Brazil) Pipo Derani	1:06.861^{1}	+1.471	10
11	**GTD Pro**	**3**	**(United States) Corvette Racing by Pratt Miller Motorsports**	**(Spain) Antonio García**	**1:09.092**	**+3.702**	11‡
12	GTD Pro	4	(United States) Corvette Racing by Pratt Miller Motorsports	(United States) Tommy Milner	1:09.428	+4.038	12
13	GTD Pro	14	(United States) Vasser Sullivan	(United Kingdom) Jack Hawksworth	1:09.626	+4.236	13
14	GTD Pro	77	(United States) AO Racing	(United Kingdom) Sebastian Priaulx	1:09.705	+4.315	14
15	GTD Pro	35	(United States) Conquest Racing	(Brazil) Daniel Serra	1:09.799	+4.409	15
16	GTD Pro	23	(United States) Heart of Racing Team	(United Kingdom) Ross Gunn	1:09.891	+4.501	16
17	GTD Pro	64	(Canada) Ford Multimatic Motorsports	(United Kingdom) Harry Tincknell	1:09.997	+4.607	17
18	GTD Pro	9	(Canada) Pfaff Motorsports	(United Kingdom) Oliver Jarvis	1:10.025	+4.635	18
19	GTD Pro	65	(Canada) Ford Multimatic Motorsports	(United States) Joey Hand	1:10.401	+5.011	19
20	GTD Pro	15	(United States) Vasser Sullivan	(United States) Frankie Montecalvo	1:10.466	+5.076	20
21	GTD Pro	1	(United States) Paul Miller Racing	(United States) Madison Snow	1:11.249	+5.859	21
Sources:

- ^{1} The No. 31 Whelen Cadillac Racing entry had its two fastest laps deleted as penalty for causing a red flag during its qualifying session.

== Post-race ==
The final results kept Cameron and Nasr atop the GTP Drivers' Championship with 1669 points, 70 ahead of third-place finishers Bourdais and van der Zande, who in turn were 13 points in front of Jaminet and Tandy. Heinrich and Priaulx's victory allowed them to extend their advantage to 84 points over second-place finishers Barnicoat and Hawksworth in the GTD Pro Drivers' Championship. Porsche topped their respective Manufactures' Championships while Porsche Penske Motorsport and AO Racing kept their respective advantages in their of Teams' Championships with six rounds remaining.

=== Race results ===
Class winners are in bold and ‡.

Pos	Class	No	Team	Drivers	Chassis	Laps	Time/Retired
Pos	Class	No	Team	Drivers	Engine	Laps	Time/Retired
1	**GTP**	**10**	**(United States) Wayne Taylor Racing with Andretti**	**(Portugal) Filipe Albuquerque (United States) Ricky Taylor**	**Acura ARX-06**	**75**	**1:40:02.133‡**
1	**GTP**	**10**	**(United States) Wayne Taylor Racing with Andretti**	**(Portugal) Filipe Albuquerque (United States) Ricky Taylor**	**Acura AR24e 2.4 L twin-turbo V6**	**75**	**1:40:02.133‡**
2	GTP	6	(Germany) Porsche Penske Motorsport	(France) Mathieu Jaminet (United Kingdom) Nick Tandy	Porsche 963	75	+1.132
2	GTP	6	(Germany) Porsche Penske Motorsport	(France) Mathieu Jaminet (United Kingdom) Nick Tandy	Porsche 9RD 4.6 L twin-turbo V8	75	+1.132
3	GTP	01	(United States) Cadillac Racing	(France) Sébastien Bourdais (Netherlands) Renger van der Zande	Cadillac V-Series.R	75	+4.198
3	GTP	01	(United States) Cadillac Racing	(France) Sébastien Bourdais (Netherlands) Renger van der Zande	Cadillac LMC55R 5.5 L V8	75	+4.198
4	GTP	7	(Germany) Porsche Penske Motorsport	(United States) Dane Cameron (Brazil) Felipe Nasr	Porsche 963	75	+5.142
4	GTP	7	(Germany) Porsche Penske Motorsport	(United States) Dane Cameron (Brazil) Felipe Nasr	Porsche 9RD 4.6 L twin-turbo V8	75	+5.142
5	GTP	40	(United States) Wayne Taylor Racing with Andretti	(Switzerland) Louis Delétraz (United States) Jordan Taylor	Acura ARX-06	75	+10.120
5	GTP	40	(United States) Wayne Taylor Racing with Andretti	(Switzerland) Louis Delétraz (United States) Jordan Taylor	Acura AR24e 2.4 L twin-turbo V6	75	+10.120
6	GTP	31	(United States) Whelen Cadillac Racing	(United Kingdom) Jack Aitken (Brazil) Pipo Derani	Cadillac V-Series.R	75	+10.359
6	GTP	31	(United States) Whelen Cadillac Racing	(United Kingdom) Jack Aitken (Brazil) Pipo Derani	Cadillac LMC55R 5.5 L V8	75	+10.359
7	GTP	24	(United States) BMW M Team RLL	(Austria) Philipp Eng (Finland) Jesse Krohn	BMW M Hybrid V8	75	+10.793
7	GTP	24	(United States) BMW M Team RLL	(Austria) Philipp Eng (Finland) Jesse Krohn	BMW P66/3 4.0 L twin-turbo V8	75	+10.793
8	GTP	85	(United States) JDC–Miller MotorSports	(Netherlands) Tijmen van der Helm (United Kingdom) Richard Westbrook	Porsche 963	74	+1 Lap
8	GTP	85	(United States) JDC–Miller MotorSports	(Netherlands) Tijmen van der Helm (United Kingdom) Richard Westbrook	Porsche 9RD 4.6 L twin-turbo V8	74	+1 Lap
9	**GTD Pro**	**77**	**(United States) AO Racing**	**(Germany) Laurin Heinrich (United Kingdom) Sebastian Priaulx**	**Porsche 911 GT3 R (992)**	**74**	**+1 Lap‡**
9	**GTD Pro**	**77**	**(United States) AO Racing**	**(Germany) Laurin Heinrich (United Kingdom) Sebastian Priaulx**	**Porsche M97/80 4.2 L Flat-6**	**74**	**+1 Lap‡**
10	GTD Pro	14	(United States) Vasser Sullivan	(United Kingdom) Ben Barnicoat (United Kingdom) Jack Hawksworth	Lexus RC F GT3	74	+1 Lap
10	GTD Pro	14	(United States) Vasser Sullivan	(United Kingdom) Ben Barnicoat (United Kingdom) Jack Hawksworth	Toyota 2UR-GSE 5.0 L V8	74	+1 Lap
11	GTD Pro	23	(United States) Heart of Racing Team	(United Kingdom) Ross Gunn (Spain) Alex Riberas	Aston Martin Vantage AMR GT3 Evo	74	+1 Lap
11	GTD Pro	23	(United States) Heart of Racing Team	(United Kingdom) Ross Gunn (Spain) Alex Riberas	Aston Martin M177 4.0 L Turbo V8	74	+1 Lap
12	GTD Pro	15	(United States) Vasser Sullivan	(United States) Frankie Montecalvo (Canada) Parker Thompson	Lexus RC F GT3	74	+1 Lap
12	GTD Pro	15	(United States) Vasser Sullivan	(United States) Frankie Montecalvo (Canada) Parker Thompson	Toyota 2UR-GSE 5.0 L V8	74	+1 Lap
13	GTD Pro	1	(United States) Paul Miller Racing	(United States) Bryan Sellers (United States) Madison Snow	BMW M4 GT3	74	+1 Lap
13	GTD Pro	1	(United States) Paul Miller Racing	(United States) Bryan Sellers (United States) Madison Snow	BMW P58 3.0 L Turbo I6	74	+1 Lap
14	GTD Pro	65	(Canada) Ford Multimatic Motorsports	(United States) Joey Hand (Germany) Dirk Müller	Ford Mustang GT3	73	+2 Laps
14	GTD Pro	65	(Canada) Ford Multimatic Motorsports	(United States) Joey Hand (Germany) Dirk Müller	Ford Coyote 5.4 L V8	73	+2 Laps
15 DNF	GTD Pro	35	(United States) Conquest Racing	(Spain) Albert Costa (Brazil) Daniel Serra	Ferrari 296 GT3	72	Did not finish
15 DNF	GTD Pro	35	(United States) Conquest Racing	(Spain) Albert Costa (Brazil) Daniel Serra	Ferrari F163 3.0 L Turbo V6	72	Did not finish
16 DNF	GTD Pro	9	(Canada) Pfaff Motorsports	(United Kingdom) Oliver Jarvis (Germany) Marvin Kirchhöfer	McLaren 720S GT3 Evo	71	Did not finish
16 DNF	GTD Pro	9	(Canada) Pfaff Motorsports	(United Kingdom) Oliver Jarvis (Germany) Marvin Kirchhöfer	McLaren M840T 4.0 L Turbo V8	71	Did not finish
17	GTD Pro	4	(United States) Corvette Racing by Pratt Miller Motorsports	(Netherlands) Nicky Catsburg (United States) Tommy Milner	Chevrolet Corvette Z06 GT3.R	69	+6 Laps
17	GTD Pro	4	(United States) Corvette Racing by Pratt Miller Motorsports	(Netherlands) Nicky Catsburg (United States) Tommy Milner	Chevrolet LT6 5.5 L V8	69	+6 Laps
18 DNF	GTP	5	(Germany) Proton Competition Mustang Sampling	(Italy) Gianmaria Bruni (Netherlands) Bent Viscaal	Porsche 963	65	Did not finish
18 DNF	GTP	5	(Germany) Proton Competition Mustang Sampling	(Italy) Gianmaria Bruni (Netherlands) Bent Viscaal	Porsche 9RD 4.6 L twin-turbo V8	65	Did not finish
19	GTD Pro	3	(United States) Corvette Racing by Pratt Miller Motorsports	(Spain) Antonio García (United Kingdom) Alexander Sims	Chevrolet Corvette Z06 GT3.R	59	+16 Laps
19	GTD Pro	3	(United States) Corvette Racing by Pratt Miller Motorsports	(Spain) Antonio García (United Kingdom) Alexander Sims	Chevrolet LT6 5.5 L V8	59	+16 Laps
20	GTD Pro	64	(Canada) Ford Multimatic Motorsports	(Germany) Mike Rockenfeller (United Kingdom) Harry Tincknell	Ford Mustang GT3	51	+24 Laps
20	GTD Pro	64	(Canada) Ford Multimatic Motorsports	(Germany) Mike Rockenfeller (United Kingdom) Harry Tincknell	Ford Coyote 5.4 L V8	51	+24 Laps
21 DNF	GTP	25	(United States) BMW M Team RLL	(United States) Connor De Phillippi (United Kingdom) Nick Yelloly	BMW M Hybrid V8	33	Suspension
21 DNF	GTP	25	(United States) BMW M Team RLL	(United States) Connor De Phillippi (United Kingdom) Nick Yelloly	BMW P66/3 4.0 L twin-turbo V8	33	Suspension

== Standings after the race ==
GTP Drivers' Championship standings
Pos.	+/–	Driver	Points
1		(United States) Dane Cameron (Brazil) Felipe Nasr	1669
2	1	(France) Sébastien Bourdais (Netherlands) Renger van der Zande	1599
3	2	(France) Mathieu Jaminet (United Kingdom) Nick Tandy	1586
4	2	(United Kingdom) Jack Aitken (Brazil) Pipo Derani	1578
5	1	(Switzerland) Louis Delétraz (United States) Jordan Taylor	1530

LMP2 Drivers' Championship standings
Pos.	+/–	Driver	Points
1		(United Kingdom) Ryan Dalziel (United States) Dwight Merriman (United States) Connor Zilisch	741
2		(Australia) Josh Burdon (Brazil) Felipe Fraga (United States) Gar Robinson	614
3		(Denmark) Malthe Jakobsen	612
4		(United States) Colin Braun (United States) George Kurtz (United Kingdom) Toby Sowery	595
5		(United States) Nick Boulle (France) Tom Dillmann (Poland) Jakub Śmiechowski	590

GTD Pro Drivers' Championship standings
Pos.	+/–	Driver	Points
1		(Germany) Laurin Heinrich (United Kingdom) Sebastian Priaulx	1359
2		(United Kingdom) Ben Barnicoat (United Kingdom) Jack Hawksworth	1275
3	1	(United Kingdom) Ross Gunn	1192
4	1	(United States) Bryan Sellers (United States) Madison Snow	1168
5	1	(Netherlands) Nicky Catsburg (United States) Tommy Milner	1060

GTD Drivers' Championship standings
Pos.	+/–	Driver	Points
1		(Switzerland) Philip Ellis (United States) Russell Ward	1367
2		(United States) Robby Foley (United States) Patrick Gallagher	1154
3		(United States) Adam Adelson (United States) Elliott Skeer	1059
4		(Canada) Parker Thompson	1038
5		(Canada) Mikaël Grenier (United States) Mike Skeen	1033

- Note: Only the top five positions are included for all sets of standings.

GTP Teams' Championship standings
Pos.	+/–	Team	Points
1		#7 Porsche Penske Motorsport	1669
2	1	#01 Cadillac Racing	1599
3	2	#6 Porsche Penske Motorsport	1586
4	2	#31 Whelen Cadillac Racing	1578
5	1	#40 Wayne Taylor Racing with Andretti	1530

LMP2 Teams' Championship standings
Pos.	+/–	Team	Points
1		#18 Era Motorsport	741
2		#74 Riley	614
3		#04 CrowdStrike Racing by APR	595
4		#52 Inter Europol by PR1/Mathiasen Motorsports	590
5		#22 United Autosports USA	558

GTD Pro Teams' Championship standings
Pos.	+/–	Team	Points
1		#77 AO Racing	1359
2		#14 Vasser Sullivan	1275
3	1	#23 Heart of Racing Team	1192
4	1	#1 Paul Miller Racing	1168
5	1	#4 Corvette Racing by Pratt Miller Motorsports	1060

GTD Teams' Championship standings
Pos.	+/–	Team	Points
1		#57 Winward Racing	1367
2		#96 Turner Motorsport	1154
3		#120 Wright Motorsports	1059
4		#32 Korthoff/Preston Motorsports	1033
5		#43 Andretti Motorsports	952

- Note: Only the top five positions are included for all sets of standings.

GTP Manufacturers' Championship standings
Pos.	+/–	Manufacturer	Points
1	1	(Germany) Porsche	1795
2	1	(United States) Cadillac	1782
3		(Japan) Acura	1726
4		(Germany) BMW	1572
5		(Italy) Lamborghini	286

GTD Pro Manufacturers' Championship standings
Pos.	+/–	Manufacturer	Points
1		(Germany) Porsche	1383
2		(Japan) Lexus	1299
3		(United Kingdom) Aston Martin	1206
4		(United States) Chevrolet	1142
5		(United Kingdom) McLaren	1115

GTD Manufacturers' Championship standings
Pos.	+/–	Manufacturer	Points
1		(Germany) Mercedes-AMG	1457
2		(Germany) Porsche	1208
3		(Italy) Lamborghini	1199
4		(Japan) Lexus	1178
5		(United Kingdom) Aston Martin	1059

- Note: Only the top five positions are included for all sets of standings.

IMSA SportsCar Championship
Previous race: Motul Course de Monterey	2024 season	Next race: Sahlen's Six Hours of The Glen
