= 2025 24 Hours of Daytona =

Endurance sports car race in Florida, US

| Previous: 2024 | Next: 2026 |
Index: Races | Winners

Map of the Daytona International Speedway combined road course

The 2025 24 Hours of Daytona was an endurance sports car race sanctioned by International Motor Sports Association (IMSA). The race was held at the Daytona International Speedway combined road course in Daytona Beach, Florida, from January 25 to January 26. This race was the 63rd running of the 24 Hours of Daytona and served as the opening round of the 2025 IMSA SportsCar Championship season.

== Background ==
=== Preview ===
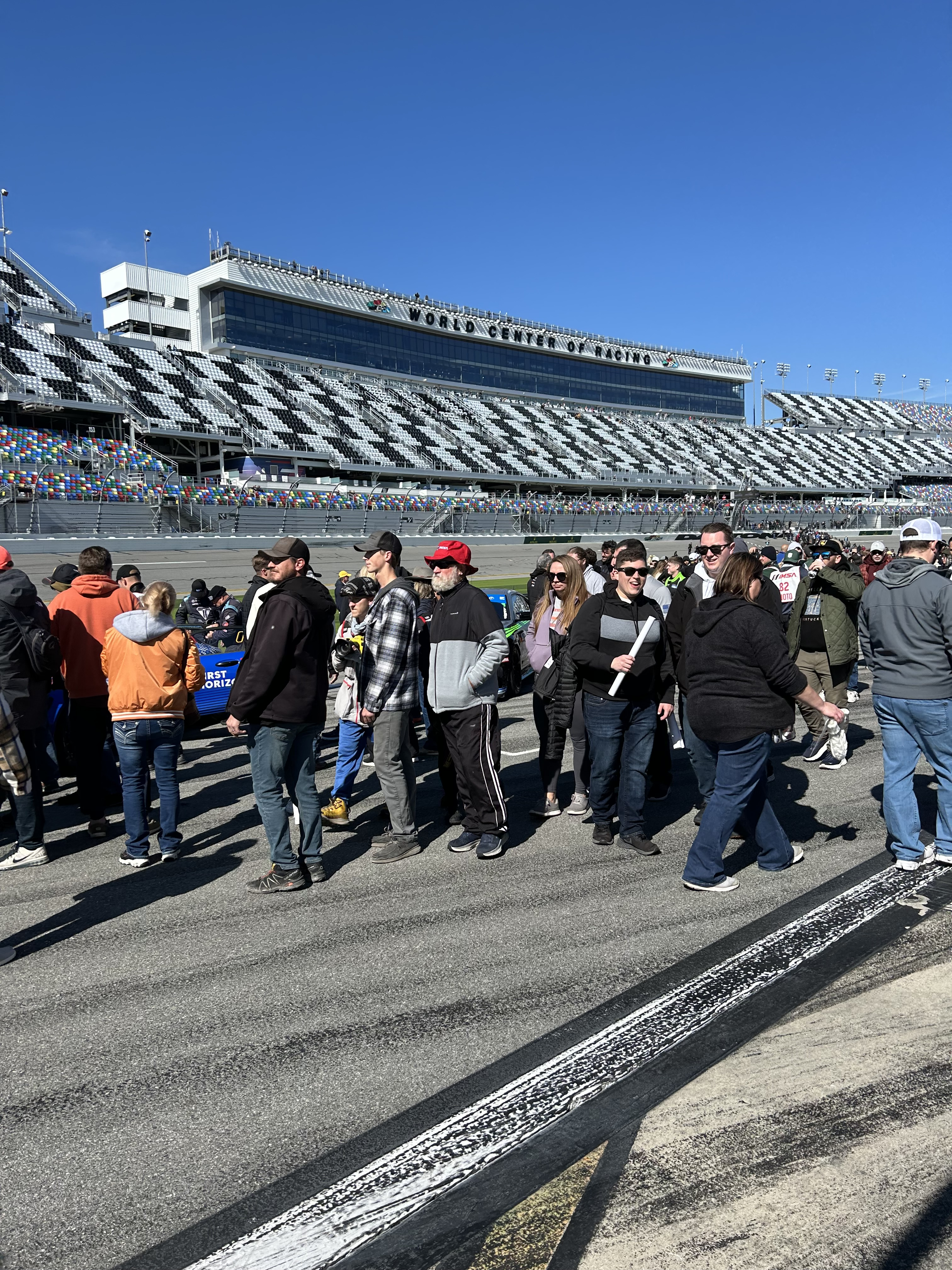
Daytona International Speedway, where the race is held annually

NASCAR founder Bill France Sr., who built Daytona International Speedway in 1959, conceived the 24 Hours of Daytona to attract European sports-car endurance racing to the United States and provide international exposure to the speedway. It is informally considered part of the Triple Crown of Endurance Racing, with the 12 Hours of Sebring and the 24 Hours of Le Mans.

International Motor Sports Association (IMSA) president John Doonan confirmed the race was a part of the 2025 IMSA SportsCar Championship (IMSA SCC) in March 2024. It was the twelfth consecutive year it was a part of the IMSA SCC, and the 63rd 24 Hours of Daytona. The 24 Hours of Daytona was the first of eleven scheduled sports car endurance races by IMSA, and the first of five races of the Michelin Endurance Cup (MEC). The race took place at the 12-turn 3.560-mile (5.729 km) Daytona International Speedway in Daytona Beach, Florida from January 25 to 26.

== Entry list ==
The entry list for the 2025 24 Hours of Daytona included drivers that features in various other racing series, including IndyCar (e.g. Alex Palou, Colton Herta), Formula 1 (e.g. Kevin Magnussen, Romain Grosjean), Formula E (Pascal Wehrlein) and NASCAR (e.g Austin Cindric, Connor Zilisch).

| No. | Entrant | Car | Driver 1 | Driver 2 | Driver 3 | Driver 4 |
GTP (Grand Touring Prototype) (12 entries)
| 5 | (Germany) Proton Competition | Porsche 963 | (France) Julien Andlauer | (Switzerland) Neel Jani | (Chile) Nico Pino | (France) Tristan Vautier |
| 6 | (Germany) Porsche Penske Motorsport | Porsche 963 | (Australia) Matt Campbell | (France) Kévin Estre | (France) Mathieu Jaminet | |
| 7 | (Germany) Porsche Penske Motorsport | Porsche 963 | (Brazil) Felipe Nasr | (United Kingdom) Nick Tandy | (Belgium) Laurens Vanthoor | |
| 10 | (United States) Cadillac Wayne Taylor Racing | Cadillac V-Series.R | (Portugal) Filipe Albuquerque | (New Zealand) Brendon Hartley | (United Kingdom) Will Stevens | (United States) Ricky Taylor |
| 24 | (United States) BMW M Team RLL | BMW M Hybrid V8 | (Austria) Philipp Eng | (Denmark) Kevin Magnussen | (Switzerland) Raffaele Marciello | (Belgium) Dries Vanthoor |
| 25 | (United States) BMW M Team RLL | BMW M Hybrid V8 | (Netherlands) Robin Frijns | (South Africa) Sheldon van der Linde | (Germany) René Rast | (Germany) Marco Wittmann |
| 31 | (United States) Cadillac Whelen | Cadillac V-Series.R | (United Kingdom) Jack Aitken | (New Zealand) Earl Bamber | (Brazil) Felipe Drugovich | (Denmark) Frederik Vesti |
| 40 | (United States) Cadillac Wayne Taylor Racing | Cadillac V-Series.R | (Switzerland) Louis Delétraz | (Japan) Kamui Kobayashi | (United States) Jordan Taylor | |
| 60 | (United States) Acura Meyer Shank Racing with Curb-Agajanian | Acura ARX-06 | (United Kingdom) Tom Blomqvist | (United States) Colin Braun | (New Zealand) Scott Dixon | (Sweden) Felix Rosenqvist |
| 63 | (Italy) Automobili Lamborghini Squadra Corse | Lamborghini SC63 | (Italy) Mirko Bortolotti | (France) Romain Grosjean | Daniil Kvyat (Note: Kvyat is Russian, but he competes as a neutral competitor as Russian national emblems were banned by the FIA following the Russian invasion of Ukraine.) | (Switzerland) Edoardo Mortara |
| 85 | (United States) JDC–Miller MotorSports | Porsche 963 | (United States) Bryce Aron | (Italy) Gianmaria Bruni | (Netherlands) Tijmen van der Helm | (Germany) Pascal Wehrlein |
| 93 | (United States) Acura Meyer Shank Racing with Curb-Agajanian | Acura ARX-06 | (Japan) Kakunoshin Ohta | (Spain) Álex Palou | (United Kingdom) Nick Yelloly | (Netherlands) Renger van der Zande |
LMP2 (Le Mans Prototype 2) (12 entries)
| 04 | (Portugal) CrowdStrike Racing by APR | Oreca 07-Gibson | (United States) Colton Herta | (Denmark) Malthe Jakobsen | (United States) George Kurtz | (United Kingdom) Toby Sowery |
| 2 | (United States) United Autosports USA | Oreca 07-Gibson | (United States) Nick Boulle | (United Kingdom) Ben Hanley | (United Kingdom) Oliver Jarvis | (Australia) Garnet Patterson |
| 8 | (Canada) Tower Motorsports | Oreca 07-Gibson | (Mexico) Sebastián Álvarez | (France) Sébastien Bourdais | (Canada) John Farano | (Netherlands) Job van Uitert |
| 11 | (France) TDS Racing | Oreca 07-Gibson | (Denmark) Mikkel Jensen | (New Zealand) Hunter McElrea | (France) Charles Milesi | (United States) Steven Thomas |
| 18 | (United States) Era Motorsport | Oreca 07-Gibson | (France) Paul-Loup Chatin | (United Kingdom) Ryan Dalziel | (Denmark) David Heinemeier Hansson | (Canada) Tobias Lütke |
| 22 | (United States) United Autosports USA | Oreca 07-Gibson | (Australia) James Allen | (United States) Dan Goldburg | (United Kingdom) Paul di Resta | (Sweden) Rasmus Lindh |
| 43 | (Poland) Inter Europol Competition | Oreca 07-Gibson | (France) Tom Dillmann | (Portugal) António Félix da Costa | (United States) Jon Field | (United States) Bijoy Garg |
| 52 | (United States) PR1/Mathiasen Motorsports | Oreca 07-Gibson | (Switzerland) Mathias Beche | (United States) Ben Keating | (Denmark) Benjamin Pedersen | (United States) Rodrigo Sales |
| 73 | (United States) Pratt Miller Motorsports | Oreca 07-Gibson | (Canada) Chris Cumming | (Brazil) Pietro Fittipaldi | (United Kingdom) Callum Ilott | (Republic of Ireland) James Roe |
| 74 | (United States) Riley | Oreca 07-Gibson | (Australia) Josh Burdon | (Brazil) Felipe Fraga | (Brazil) Felipe Massa | (United States) Gar Robinson |
| 88 | (Italy) AF Corse | Oreca 07-Gibson | (Denmark) Nicklas Nielsen | (Argentina) Luis Pérez Companc | (France) Matthieu Vaxivière | (United States) Dylan Murry |
| 99 | (United States) AO Racing | Oreca 07-Gibson | (United States) Dane Cameron | (United Kingdom) Jonny Edgar | (United States) P. J. Hyett | (Denmark) Christian Rasmussen |
GTD Pro (GT Daytona Pro) (15 entries)
| 007 | (United States) Heart of Racing Team | Aston Martin Vantage AMR GT3 Evo | (Canada) Roman De Angelis | (United Kingdom) Ross Gunn | (Spain) Alex Riberas | (Denmark) Marco Sørensen |
| 1 | (United States) Paul Miller Racing | BMW M4 GT3 Evo | (United States) Connor De Phillippi | (South Africa) Kelvin van der Linde | (United States) Madison Snow | (United States) Neil Verhagen |
| 3 | (United States) Corvette Racing by Pratt Miller Motorsports | Chevrolet Corvette Z06 GT3.R | (Spain) Antonio García | (Spain) Daniel Juncadella | (United Kingdom) Alexander Sims | |
| 4 | (United States) Corvette Racing by Pratt Miller Motorsports | Chevrolet Corvette Z06 GT3.R | (Netherlands) Nicky Catsburg | (United States) Tommy Milner | (Argentina) Nico Varrone | |
| 9 | (Canada) Pfaff Motorsports | Lamborghini Huracán GT3 Evo 2 | (Italy) Andrea Caldarelli | (Canada) James Hinchcliffe | (Italy) Marco Mapelli | (South Africa) Jordan Pepper |
| 14 | (United States) Vasser Sullivan Racing | Lexus RC F GT3 | (United Kingdom) Ben Barnicoat | (United States) Townsend Bell | (United States) Kyle Kirkwood | (United States) Aaron Telitz |
| 20 | (Germany) Proton Competition | Porsche 911 GT3 R (992) | (Italy) Matteo Cressoni | (Austria) Richard Lietz | (Austria) Thomas Preining | (Italy) Claudio Schiavoni |
| 48 | (United States) Paul Miller Racing | BMW M4 GT3 Evo | (Brazil) Augusto Farfus | (United Kingdom) Dan Harper | (Germany) Max Hesse | (Finland) Jesse Krohn |
| 64 | (Canada) Ford Multimatic Motorsports | Ford Mustang GT3 | (United States) Austin Cindric | (United Kingdom) Sebastian Priaulx | (Germany) Mike Rockenfeller | |
| 65 | (Canada) Ford Multimatic Motorsports | Ford Mustang GT3 | (Germany) Christopher Mies | (Norway) Dennis Olsen | (Belgium) Frédéric Vervisch | |
| 69 | (Germany) GetSpeed | Mercedes-AMG GT3 Evo | (United States) Anthony Bartone | (Belgium) Maxime Martin | (Germany) Fabian Schiller | (Germany) Luca Stolz |
| 75 | (Australia) 75 Express | Mercedes-AMG GT3 Evo | (Germany) Maro Engel | (Andorra) Jules Gounon | (Canada) Mikaël Grenier | (Australia) Kenny Habul |
| 77 | (United States) AO Racing | Porsche 911 GT3 R (992) | (Austria) Klaus Bachler | (Germany) Laurin Heinrich | (Belgium) Alessio Picariello | |
| 81 | (United States) DragonSpeed | Ferrari 296 GT3 | (Spain) Albert Costa | (Spain) Miguel Molina | (France) Thomas Neubauer | (Italy) Davide Rigon |
| 91 | (United States) Trackhouse by TF Sport | Chevrolet Corvette Z06 GT3.R | (New Zealand) Shane van Gisbergen | (United States) Ben Keating | (New Zealand) Scott McLaughlin | (United States) Connor Zilisch |
GTD (GT Daytona) (22 entries)
| 021 | (United States) Triarsi Competizione | Ferrari 296 GT3 | (United Kingdom) James Calado | (United Kingdom) Stevan McAleer | (United States) Sheena Monk | (United States) Mike Skeen |
| 023 | (United States) Triarsi Competizione | Ferrari 296 GT3 | (Italy) Eddie Cheever III | (Italy) Alessio Rovera | (United States) Charlie Scardina | (United States) Onofrio Triarsi |
| 12 | (United States) Vasser Sullivan Racing | Lexus RC F GT3 | (United Kingdom) Jack Hawksworth | (United States) Kyle Kirkwood | (United States) Frankie Montecalvo | (Canada) Parker Thompson |
| 13 | (Canada) AWA | Chevrolet Corvette Z06 GT3.R | (United Kingdom) Matt Bell | (Canada) Orey Fidani | (Germany) Lars Kern | (Germany) Marvin Kirchhöfer |
| 19 | (United States) van der Steur Racing | Aston Martin Vantage AMR GT3 Evo | (France) Valentin Hasse-Clot | (United States) Anthony McIntosh | (France) Maxime Robin | (United States) Rory van der Steur |
| 21 | (Italy) AF Corse | Ferrari 296 GT3 | (Japan) Kei Cozzolino | (United States) Simon Mann | (Italy) Alessandro Pier Guidi | (France) Lilou Wadoux |
| 27 | (United States) Heart of Racing Team | Aston Martin Vantage AMR GT3 Evo | (Italy) Mattia Drudi | (United Kingdom) Tom Gamble | (Canada) Zacharie Robichon | (United Kingdom) Casper Stevenson |
| 32 | (United States) Korthoff Competition Motors | Mercedes-AMG GT3 Evo | (Germany) Maximilian Götz | (United States) Kenton Koch | (United States) Seth Lucas | (Canada) Daniel Morad |
| 34 | (United States) Conquest Racing | Ferrari 296 GT3 | (Italy) Giacomo Altoè | (United States) Manny Franco | (Monaco) Cédric Sbirrazzuoli | (Brazil) Daniel Serra |
| 36 | (United States) DXDT Racing | Chevrolet Corvette Z06 GT3.R | (Brazil) Pipo Derani | (Republic of Ireland) Charlie Eastwood | (United States) Alec Udell | (Turkey) Salih Yoluç |
| 44 | (United States) Magnus Racing | Aston Martin Vantage AMR GT3 Evo | (United States) Andy Lally | (United States) John Potter | (United States) Spencer Pumpelly | (Denmark) Nicki Thiim |
| 45 | (United States) Wayne Taylor Racing | Lamborghini Huracán GT3 Evo 2 | (United States) Graham Doyle | (Costa Rica) Danny Formal | (United States) Trent Hindman | (Canada) Kyle Marcelli |
| 47 | (Italy) Cetilar Racing | Ferrari 296 GT3 | (Italy) Antonio Fuoco | (Italy) Nicola Lacorte | (Italy) Roberto Lacorte | (Italy) Lorenzo Patrese |
| 50 | (Italy) AF Corse | Ferrari 296 GT3 | (Italy) Riccardo Agostini | (Denmark) Conrad Laursen | (Monaco) Arthur Leclerc | (Brazil) Custodio Toledo |
| 57 | (United States) Winward Racing | Mercedes-AMG GT3 Evo | (Austria) Lucas Auer | (Netherlands) Indy Dontje | (Switzerland) Philip Ellis | (United States) Russell Ward |
| 66 | (United States) Gradient Racing | Ford Mustang GT3 | (United Kingdom) Till Bechtolsheimer | (Colombia) Tatiana Calderón | (United States) Joey Hand | (United Kingdom) Harry Tincknell |
| 70 | (United Kingdom) Inception Racing | Ferrari 296 GT3 | (Italy) David Fumanelli | (United States) Brendan Iribe | (United Kingdom) Ollie Millroy | (Denmark) Frederik Schandorff |
| 78 | (United States) Forte Racing | Lamborghini Huracán GT3 Evo 2 | (Germany) Mario Farnbacher | (Canada) Misha Goikhberg | (United States) Parker Kligerman | (France) Franck Perera |
| 80 | (United States) Lone Star Racing | Mercedes-AMG GT3 Evo | (Australia) Scott Andrews | (Estonia) Ralf Aron | (United States) Eric Filgueiras | (United States) Dan Knox |
| 83 | (Italy) Iron Dames | Porsche 911 GT3 R (992) | (Belgium) Sarah Bovy | (Switzerland) Rahel Frey | (Switzerland) Karen Gaillard | (Denmark) Michelle Gatting |
| 96 | (United States) Turner Motorsport | BMW M4 GT3 Evo | (United States) Robby Foley | (United States) Patrick Gallagher | (Germany) Jens Klingmann | (United States) Jake Walker |
| 120 | (United States) Wright Motorsports | Porsche 911 GT3 R (992) | (United States) Adam Adelson | (Turkey) Ayhancan Güven | (Australia) Tom Sargent | (United States) Elliott Skeer |

== Qualifying ==
=== Qualifying results ===
| Pos. | Class | No. | Entry | Driver | Time | Gap | Grid |
|---|---|---|---|---|---|---|---|
| 1 | GTP | 24 | (United States) BMW M Team RLL | (Belgium) Dries Vanthoor | 1:33.895 | — | 1‡ |
| 2 | GTP | 93 | (United States) Acura Meyer Shank Racing w/ Curb-Agajanian | (United Kingdom) Nick Yelloly | 1:34.186 | +0.291 | 2 |
| 3 | GTP | 7 | (Germany) Porsche Penske Motorsport | (Brazil) Felipe Nasr | 1:34.280 | +0.385 | 3 |
| 4 | GTP | 31 | (United States) Cadillac Whelen | (United Kingdom) Jack Aitken | 1:34.350 | +0.455 | 4 |
| 5 | GTP | 85 | (United States) JDC–Miller MotorSports | (Italy) Gianmaria Bruni | 1:34.374 | +0.479 | 5 |
| 6 | GTP | 60 | (United States) Acura Meyer Shank Racing w/ Curb-Agajanian | (United Kingdom) Tom Blomqvist | 1:34.432 | +0.537 | 6 |
| 7 | GTP | 10 | (United States) Cadillac Wayne Taylor Racing | (Portugal) Filipe Albuquerque | 1:34.933 | +1.038 | 7 |
| 8 | GTP | 40 | (United States) Cadillac Wayne Taylor Racing | (Switzerland) Louis Delétraz | 1:34.935 | +1.040 | 8 |
| 9 | GTP | 63 | (Italy) Automobili Lamborghini Squadra Corse | (Italy) Mirko Bortolotti | 1:36.475 | +2.580 | 9 |
| 10 | GTP | 6 | (Germany) Porsche Penske Motorsport | (Australia) Matt Campbell | 1:36.576 | +2.681 | 10 |
| 11 | LMP2 | 22 | (United States) United Autosports USA | (United States) Dan Goldburg | 1:38.676 | +4.781 | 13‡ |
| 12 | LMP2 | 52 | (United States) PR1/Mathiasen Motorsports | (United States) Ben Keating | 1:39.000 | +5.105 | 14 |
| 13 | LMP2 | 2 | (United States) United Autosports USA | (United States) Nick Boulle | 1:39.203 | +5.308 | 15 |
| 14 | LMP2 | 73 | (United States) Pratt Miller Motorsports | (Canada) Chris Cumming | 1:39.217 | +5.322 | 16 |
| 15 | LMP2 | 11 | (France) TDS Racing | (United States) Steven Thomas | 1:39.389 | +5.494 | 17 |
| 16 | LMP2 | 99 | (United States) AO Racing | (United States) P. J. Hyett | 1:39.600 | +5.705 | 18 |
| 17 | LMP2 | 88 | (Italy) AF Corse | (Argentina) Luis Pérez Companc | 1:39.754 | +5.859 | 19 |
| 18 | LMP2 | 74 | (United States) Riley | (United States) Gar Robinson | 1:39.768 | +5.873 | 20 |
| 19 | LMP2 | 04 | (United States) CrowdStrike Racing by APR | (United States) George Kurtz | 1:39.868 | +5.973 | 21 |
| 20 | LMP2 | 43 | (Poland) Inter Europol Competition | (United States) Jon Field | 1:40.401 | +6.506 | 22 |
| 21 | LMP2 | 18 | (United States) Era Motorsport | (Canada) Tobias Lütke | 1:41.158 | +7.263 | 23 |
| 22 | LMP2 | 8 | (Canada) Tower Motorsports | (Canada) John Farano | 1:41.244 | +7.349 | 24 |
| 23 | GTD Pro | 64 | (Canada) Ford Multimatic Motorsports | (Germany) Mike Rockenfeller | 1:45.523 | +11.628 | 25‡ |
| 24 | GTD Pro | 65 | (Canada) Ford Multimatic Motorsports | (Belgium) Frédéric Vervisch | 1:45.855 | +11.960 | 26 |
| 25 | GTD Pro | 48 | (United States) Paul Miller Racing | (United Kingdom) Dan Harper | 1:46.005 | +12.110 | 27 |
| 26 | GTD Pro | 3 | (United States) Corvette Racing by Pratt Miller Motorsports | (United Kingdom) Alexander Sims | 1:46.012 | +12.117 | 28 |
| 27 | GTD Pro | 9 | (Canada) Pfaff Motorsports | (Italy) Andrea Caldarelli | 1:46.136 | +12.241 | 29 |
| 28 | GTD Pro | 4 | (United States) Corvette Racing by Pratt Miller Motorsports | (United States) Tommy Milner | 1:46.445 | +12.550 | 30 |
| 29 | GTD Pro | 77 | (United States) AO Racing | (Germany) Laurin Heinrich | 1:46.539 | +12.644 | 31 |
| 30 | GTD Pro | 91 | (United States) Trackhouse by TF Sport | (United States) Connor Zilisch | 1:46.579 | +12.684 | 32 |
| 31 | GTD Pro | 75 | (Australia) 75 Express | (Germany) Maro Engel | 1:46.613 | +12.718 | 33 |
| 32 | GTD | 120 | (United States) Wright Motorsports | (United States) Elliott Skeer | 1:46.634 | +12.739 | 40‡ |
| 33 | GTD Pro | 007 | (United States) Heart of Racing Team | (Denmark) Marco Sørensen | 1:46.646 | +12.751 | 34 |
| 34 | GTD | 57 | (United States) Winward Racing | (Switzerland) Philip Ellis | 1:46.652 | +12.757 | 41 |
| 35 | GTD Pro | 69 | (Germany) GetSpeed | (Germany) Luca Stolz | 1:46.653 | +12.758 | 35 |
| 36 | GTD | 45 | (United States) Wayne Taylor Racing | (United States) Trent Hindman | 1:46.658 | +12.763 | 42 |
| 37 | GTD | 12 | (United States) Vasser Sullivan Racing | (Canada) Parker Thompson | 1:46.788 | +12.893 | 43 |
| 38 | GTD | 78 | (United States) Forte Racing | (France) Franck Perera | 1:46.805 | +12.910 | 44 |
| 39 | GTD | 19 | (United States) van der Steur Racing | (France) Valentin Hasse-Clot | 1:46.851 | +12.956 | 45 |
| 40 | GTD Pro | 81 | (United States) DragonSpeed | (Italy) Davide Rigon | 1:46.858 | +12.963 | 36 |
| 41 | GTD | 27 | (United States) Heart of Racing Team | (Canada) Zacharie Robichon | 1:46.905 | +13.010 | 46 |
| 42 | GTD | 70 | (United Kingdom) Inception Racing | (Denmark) Frederik Schandorff | 1:46.928 | +13.033 | 47 |
| 43 | GTD | 34 | (United States) Conquest Racing | (Brazil) Daniel Serra | 1:46.959 | +13.064 | 48 |
| 44 | GTD Pro | 1 | (United States) Paul Miller Racing | (United States) Madison Snow | 1:46.963 | +13.068 | 37 |
| 45 | GTD | 83 | (Italy) Iron Dames | (Denmark) Michelle Gatting | 1:46.981 | +13.086 | 49 |
| 46 | GTD Pro | 20 | (Germany) Proton Competition | (Austria) Thomas Preining | 1:47.115 | +13.220 | 38 |
| 47 | GTD | 021 | (United States) Triarsi Competizione | (United Kingdom) James Calado | 1:47.189 | +13.294 | 50 |
| 48 | GTD | 44 | (United States) Magnus Racing | (United States) John Potter | 1:47.280 | +13.385 | 51 |
| 49 | GTD | 96 | (United States) Turner Motorsport | (United States) Robby Foley | 1:47.281 | +13.386 | 52 |
| 50 | GTD Pro | 14 | (United States) Vasser Sullivan Racing | (United States) Kyle Kirkwood | 1:47.281 | +13.386 | 39 |
| 51 | GTD | 21 | (Italy) AF Corse | (United States) Simon Mann | 1:47.382 | +13.487 | 53 |
| 52 | GTD | 36 | (United States) DXDT Racing | (Republic of Ireland) Charlie Eastwood | 1:47.592 | +13.697 | 54 |
| 53 | GTD | 13 | (Canada) AWA | (Canada) Orey Fidani | 1:48.334 | +14.439 | 55 |
| 54 | GTD | 66 | (United States) Gradient Racing | (United Kingdom) Till Bechtolsheimer | 1:48.381 | +14.486 | 56 |
| 55 | GTD | 80 | (United States) Lone Star Racing | (United States) Dan Knox | 1:48.452 | +14.557 | 57 |
| 56 | GTD | 47 | (Italy) Cetilar Racing | (Italy) Roberto Lacorte | 1:48.558 | +14.663 | 58 |
| 57 | GTD | 50 | (Italy) AF Corse | (Brazil) Custodio Toledo | 1:49.656 | +15.761 | 59 |
| 58 | GTD | 32 | (United States) Korthoff/Preston Motorsports | (Germany) Maximilian Götz | 1:53.205 | +19.310 | 60 |
| 59 | GTP | 5 | (Germany) Proton Competition | No Time Established^{1} | | | 11 |
| 60 | GTD | 023 | (United States) Triarsi Competizione | No Time Established | | | 61 |
| 61 | GTP | 25 | (United States) BMW M Team RLL | No Time Established^{2} | | | 12 |
Sources:

- ^{1} The No. 5 Proton Competition entry did not participate in qualifying after the car encountered a right-front upright to wishbone failure in opening practice.
- ^{2} The No. 25 BMW M Team RLL entry stopped on track in qualifying due to a HV related issue and did not set a lap time.

== Post-race ==
Since it was the season's first race, Nasr, Tandy, and Vanthoor led the GTP Drivers' Championship with 380 points, ahead of Braun, Blomqvist, Dixon, and Rosenqvist by 25 points. Allen, di Resta, Goldburg, and Lindh led the LMP2 point standings, ahead of Fraga, Massa, Robinson, and Burdon. Mies, Olsen, and Versich held the GTD Pro Drivers' Championship lead over Sims, García, and Juncadella. In GTD, Bell, Fidani, Lars Kern, and Kirchhöfer led the class points standings over Adelson, Guven, Skeer, and Sargent. Porsche Penske, United Autosports USA, Ford Multimatic Motorsports and AWA became the leaders of their respective Teams' Championships. Porsche, Ford, and Chevrolet assumed the lead of their respective Manufacturers' Championships with 10 rounds remaining in the season.

=== Results ===
Class winners denoted in bold and with ‡

| Pos | Class | PIC | No. | Team / Entrant | Drivers | Chassis | Laps | Time/Retired |
| Pos | Class | PIC | No. | Team / Entrant | Drivers | Engine | Laps | Time/Retired |
|---|---|---|---|---|---|---|---|---|
| 1 | **GTP** | **1** | **7** | **(Germany) Porsche Penske Motorsport** | **(Brazil) Felipe Nasr (United Kingdom) Nick Tandy (Belgium) Laurens Vanthoor** | **Porsche 963** | **781** | **24:00:38.019‡** |
| 1 | **GTP** | **1** | **7** | **(Germany) Porsche Penske Motorsport** | **(Brazil) Felipe Nasr (United Kingdom) Nick Tandy (Belgium) Laurens Vanthoor** | **Porsche 9RD 4.6 L Twin-Turbo V8** | **781** | **24:00:38.019‡** |
| 2 | GTP | 2 | 60 | (United States) Acura Meyer Shank Racing with Curb-Agajanian | (United Kingdom) Tom Blomqvist (United States) Colin Braun (New Zealand) Scott Dixon (Sweden) Felix Rosenqvist | Acura ARX-06 | 781 | +1.335 |
| 2 | GTP | 2 | 60 | (United States) Acura Meyer Shank Racing with Curb-Agajanian | (United Kingdom) Tom Blomqvist (United States) Colin Braun (New Zealand) Scott Dixon (Sweden) Felix Rosenqvist | Acura AR24e 2.4 L Twin-Turbo V6 | 781 | +1.335 |
| 3 | GTP | 3 | 6 | (Germany) Porsche Penske Motorsport | (Australia) Matt Campbell (France) Kévin Estre (France) Mathieu Jaminet | Porsche 963 | 781 | +4.423 |
| 3 | GTP | 3 | 6 | (Germany) Porsche Penske Motorsport | (Australia) Matt Campbell (France) Kévin Estre (France) Mathieu Jaminet | Porsche 9RD 4.6 L Twin-Turbo V8 | 781 | +4.423 |
| 4 | GTP | 4 | 24 | (United States) BMW M Team RLL | (Austria) Philipp Eng (Denmark) Kevin Magnussen (Switzerland) Raffaele Marciello (Belgium) Dries Vanthoor | BMW M Hybrid V8 | 780 | +1 Lap |
| 4 | GTP | 4 | 24 | (United States) BMW M Team RLL | (Austria) Philipp Eng (Denmark) Kevin Magnussen (Switzerland) Raffaele Marciello (Belgium) Dries Vanthoor | BMW P66/3 4.0 L Twin-Turbo V8 | 780 | +1 Lap |
| 5 | GTP | 5 | 10 | (United States) Cadillac Wayne Taylor Racing | (Portugal) Filipe Albuquerque (New Zealand) Brendon Hartley (United Kingdom) Will Stevens (United States) Ricky Taylor | Cadillac V-Series.R | 780 | +1 Lap |
| 5 | GTP | 5 | 10 | (United States) Cadillac Wayne Taylor Racing | (Portugal) Filipe Albuquerque (New Zealand) Brendon Hartley (United Kingdom) Will Stevens (United States) Ricky Taylor | Cadillac LMC55R 5.5 L V8 | 780 | +1 Lap |
| 6 | GTP | 6 | 85 | (United States) JDC–Miller MotorSports | (United States) Bryce Aron (Italy) Gianmaria Bruni (Netherlands) Tijmen van der Helm (Germany) Pascal Wehrlein | Porsche 963 | 780 | +1 Lap |
| 6 | GTP | 6 | 85 | (United States) JDC–Miller MotorSports | (United States) Bryce Aron (Italy) Gianmaria Bruni (Netherlands) Tijmen van der Helm (Germany) Pascal Wehrlein | Porsche 9RD 4.6 L Twin-Turbo V8 | 780 | +1 Lap |
| 7 | GTP | 7 | 25 | (United States) BMW M Team RLL | (Netherlands) Robin Frijns (Germany) René Rast (South Africa) Sheldon van der Linde (Germany) Marco Wittmann | BMW M Hybrid V8 | 777 | +4 Laps |
| 7 | GTP | 7 | 25 | (United States) BMW M Team RLL | (Netherlands) Robin Frijns (Germany) René Rast (South Africa) Sheldon van der Linde (Germany) Marco Wittmann | BMW P66/3 4.0 L Twin-Turbo V8 | 777 | +4 Laps |
| 8 | **LMP2** | **1** | **22** | **(United States) United Autosports USA** | **(Australia) James Allen (United Kingdom) Paul di Resta (United States) Dan Goldburg (Sweden) Rasmus Lindh** | **Oreca 07** | **765** | **+16 Laps‡** |
| 8 | **LMP2** | **1** | **22** | **(United States) United Autosports USA** | **(Australia) James Allen (United Kingdom) Paul di Resta (United States) Dan Goldburg (Sweden) Rasmus Lindh** | **Gibson GK428 4.2 L V8** | **765** | **+16 Laps‡** |
| 9 | LMP2 | 2 | 74 | (United States) Riley | (Australia) Josh Burdon (Brazil) Felipe Fraga (Brazil) Felipe Massa (United States) Gar Robinson | Oreca 07 | 765 | +16 Laps |
| 9 | LMP2 | 2 | 74 | (United States) Riley | (Australia) Josh Burdon (Brazil) Felipe Fraga (Brazil) Felipe Massa (United States) Gar Robinson | Gibson GK428 4.2 L V8 | 765 | +16 Laps |
| 10 | LMP2 | 3 | 52 | (United States) PR1/Mathiasen Motorsports | (Switzerland) Mathias Beche (United States) Ben Keating (Denmark) Benjamin Pedersen (United States) Rodrigo Sales | Oreca 07 | 764 | +17 Laps |
| 10 | LMP2 | 3 | 52 | (United States) PR1/Mathiasen Motorsports | (Switzerland) Mathias Beche (United States) Ben Keating (Denmark) Benjamin Pedersen (United States) Rodrigo Sales | Gibson GK428 4.2 L V8 | 764 | +17 Laps |
| 11 | LMP2 | 4 | 18 | (United States) Era Motorsport | (France) Paul-Loup Chatin (United Kingdom) Ryan Dalziel (Denmark) David Heinemeier Hansson (Canada) Tobias Lütke | Oreca 07 | 764 | +17 Laps |
| 11 | LMP2 | 4 | 18 | (United States) Era Motorsport | (France) Paul-Loup Chatin (United Kingdom) Ryan Dalziel (Denmark) David Heinemeier Hansson (Canada) Tobias Lütke | Gibson GK428 4.2 L V8 | 764 | +17 Laps |
| 12 | LMP2 | 5 | 99 | (United States) AO Racing | (United States) Dane Cameron (United Kingdom) Jonny Edgar (United States) P. J. Hyett (Denmark) Christian Rasmussen | Oreca 07 | 757 | +24 Laps |
| 12 | LMP2 | 5 | 99 | (United States) AO Racing | (United States) Dane Cameron (United Kingdom) Jonny Edgar (United States) P. J. Hyett (Denmark) Christian Rasmussen | Gibson GK428 4.2 L V8 | 757 | +24 Laps |
| 13 | LMP2 | 6 | 04 | (Portugal) CrowdStrike Racing by APR | (United States) Colton Herta (Denmark) Malthe Jakobsen (United States) George Kurtz (United Kingdom) Toby Sowery | Oreca 07 | 755 | +26 Laps |
| 13 | LMP2 | 6 | 04 | (Portugal) CrowdStrike Racing by APR | (United States) Colton Herta (Denmark) Malthe Jakobsen (United States) George Kurtz (United Kingdom) Toby Sowery | Gibson GK428 4.2 L V8 | 755 | +26 Laps |
| 14 | GTP | 8 | 93 | (United States) Acura Meyer Shank Racing with Curb-Agajanian | (Japan) Kakunoshin Ohta (Spain) Álex Palou (Netherlands) Renger van der Zande (United Kingdom) Nick Yelloly | Acura ARX-06 | 741 | +40 Laps |
| 14 | GTP | 8 | 93 | (United States) Acura Meyer Shank Racing with Curb-Agajanian | (Japan) Kakunoshin Ohta (Spain) Álex Palou (Netherlands) Renger van der Zande (United Kingdom) Nick Yelloly | Acura AR24e 2.4 L Twin-Turbo V6 | 741 | +40 Laps |
| 15 | GTP | 9 | 31 | (United States) Cadillac Whelen | (United Kingdom) Jack Aitken (New Zealand) Earl Bamber (Brazil) Felipe Drugovich (Denmark) Frederik Vesti | Cadillac V-Series.R | 731 | +50 Laps |
| 15 | GTP | 9 | 31 | (United States) Cadillac Whelen | (United Kingdom) Jack Aitken (New Zealand) Earl Bamber (Brazil) Felipe Drugovich (Denmark) Frederik Vesti | Cadillac LMC55R 5.5 L V8 | 731 | +50 Laps |
| 16 | **GTD Pro** | **1** | **65** | **(Canada) Ford Multimatic Motorsports** | **(Germany) Christopher Mies (Norway) Dennis Olsen (Belgium) Frédéric Vervisch** | **Ford Mustang GT3** | **723** | **+58 Laps‡** |
| 16 | **GTD Pro** | **1** | **65** | **(Canada) Ford Multimatic Motorsports** | **(Germany) Christopher Mies (Norway) Dennis Olsen (Belgium) Frédéric Vervisch** | **Ford Coyote 5.4 L V8** | **723** | **+58 Laps‡** |
| 17 | GTD Pro | 2 | 3 | (United States) Corvette Racing by Pratt Miller Motorsports | (Spain) Antonio García (Spain) Daniel Juncadella (United Kingdom) Alexander Sims | Chevrolet Corvette Z06 GT3.R | 723 | +58 Laps |
| 17 | GTD Pro | 2 | 3 | (United States) Corvette Racing by Pratt Miller Motorsports | (Spain) Antonio García (Spain) Daniel Juncadella (United Kingdom) Alexander Sims | Chevrolet LT6 5.5 L V8 | 723 | +58 Laps |
| 18 | GTD Pro | 3 | 64 | (Canada) Ford Multimatic Motorsports | (United States) Austin Cindric (United Kingdom) Sebastian Priaulx (Germany) Mike Rockenfeller | Ford Mustang GT3 | 723 | +58 Laps |
| 18 | GTD Pro | 3 | 64 | (Canada) Ford Multimatic Motorsports | (United States) Austin Cindric (United Kingdom) Sebastian Priaulx (Germany) Mike Rockenfeller | Ford Coyote 5.4 L V8 | 723 | +58 Laps |
| 19 | GTD Pro | 4 | 1 | (United States) Paul Miller Racing | (United States) Connor De Phillippi (United States) Madison Snow (South Africa) Kelvin van der Linde (United States) Neil Verhagen | BMW M4 GT3 Evo | 723 | +58 Laps |
| 19 | GTD Pro | 4 | 1 | (United States) Paul Miller Racing | (United States) Connor De Phillippi (United States) Madison Snow (South Africa) Kelvin van der Linde (United States) Neil Verhagen | BMW P58 3.0 L Twin-Turbo I6 | 723 | +58 Laps |
| 20 | GTD Pro | 5 | 69 | (Germany) GetSpeed | (United States) Anthony Bartone (Belgium) Maxime Martin (Germany) Fabian Schiller (Germany) Luca Stolz | Mercedes-AMG GT3 Evo | 723 | +58 Laps |
| 20 | GTD Pro | 5 | 69 | (Germany) GetSpeed | (United States) Anthony Bartone (Belgium) Maxime Martin (Germany) Fabian Schiller (Germany) Luca Stolz | Mercedes-AMG M159 6.2 L V8 | 723 | +58 Laps |
| 21 | GTD Pro | 6 | 81 | (United States) DragonSpeed | (Spain) Albert Costa (Spain) Miguel Molina (France) Thomas Neubauer (Italy) Davide Rigon | Ferrari 296 GT3 | 723 | +58 Laps |
| 21 | GTD Pro | 6 | 81 | (United States) DragonSpeed | (Spain) Albert Costa (Spain) Miguel Molina (France) Thomas Neubauer (Italy) Davide Rigon | Ferrari F163CE 3.0 L Turbo V6 | 723 | +58 Laps |
| 22 | GTD Pro | 7 | 4 | (United States) Corvette Racing by Pratt Miller Motorsports | (Netherlands) Nicky Catsburg (United States) Tommy Milner (Argentina) Nicolás Varrone | Chevrolet Corvette Z06 GT3.R | 723 | +58 Laps |
| 22 | GTD Pro | 7 | 4 | (United States) Corvette Racing by Pratt Miller Motorsports | (Netherlands) Nicky Catsburg (United States) Tommy Milner (Argentina) Nicolás Varrone | Chevrolet LT6 5.5 L V8 | 723 | +58 Laps |
| 23 | GTD Pro | 8 | 77 | (United States) AO Racing | (Austria) Klaus Bachler (Germany) Laurin Heinrich (Belgium) Alessio Picariello | Porsche 911 GT3 R (992) | 722 | +59 Laps |
| 23 | GTD Pro | 8 | 77 | (United States) AO Racing | (Austria) Klaus Bachler (Germany) Laurin Heinrich (Belgium) Alessio Picariello | Porsche M97/80 4.2 L Flat-6 | 722 | +59 Laps |
| 24 | GTD Pro | 9 | 91 | (United States) Trackhouse by TF Sport | (United States) Ben Keating (New Zealand) Scott McLaughlin (New Zealand) Shane van Gisbergen (United States) Connor Zilisch | Chevrolet Corvette Z06 GT3.R | 722 | +59 Laps |
| 24 | GTD Pro | 9 | 91 | (United States) Trackhouse by TF Sport | (United States) Ben Keating (New Zealand) Scott McLaughlin (New Zealand) Shane van Gisbergen (United States) Connor Zilisch | Chevrolet LT6 5.5 L V8 | 722 | +59 Laps |
| 25 | **GTD** | **1** | **13** | **(Canada) AWA** | **(United Kingdom) Matt Bell (Canada) Orey Fidani (Germany) Lars Kern (Germany) Marvin Kirchhöfer** | **Chevrolet Corvette Z06 GT3.R** | **719** | **+62 Laps‡** |
| 25 | **GTD** | **1** | **13** | **(Canada) AWA** | **(United Kingdom) Matt Bell (Canada) Orey Fidani (Germany) Lars Kern (Germany) Marvin Kirchhöfer** | **Chevrolet LT6 5.5 L V8** | **719** | **+62 Laps‡** |
| 26 | GTD | 2 | 120 | (United States) Wright Motorsports | (United States) Adam Adelson (Turkey) Ayhancan Güven (Australia) Tom Sargent (United States) Elliott Skeer | Porsche 911 GT3 R (992) | 719 | +62 Laps |
| 26 | GTD | 2 | 120 | (United States) Wright Motorsports | (United States) Adam Adelson (Turkey) Ayhancan Güven (Australia) Tom Sargent (United States) Elliott Skeer | Porsche M97/80 4.2 L Flat-6 | 719 | +62 Laps |
| 27 | GTD | 3 | 27 | (United States) Heart of Racing Team | (Italy) Mattia Drudi (United Kingdom) Tom Gamble (Canada) Zacharie Robichon (United Kingdom) Casper Stevenson | Aston Martin Vantage AMR GT3 Evo | 719 | +62 Laps |
| 27 | GTD | 3 | 27 | (United States) Heart of Racing Team | (Italy) Mattia Drudi (United Kingdom) Tom Gamble (Canada) Zacharie Robichon (United Kingdom) Casper Stevenson | Aston Martin M177 4.0 L Turbo V8 | 719 | +62 Laps |
| 28 | GTD Pro | 10 | 20 | (Germany) Proton Competition | (Italy) Matteo Cressoni (Austria) Richard Lietz (Austria) Thomas Preining (Italy) Claudio Schiavoni | Porsche 911 GT3 R (992) | 719 | +62 Laps |
| 28 | GTD Pro | 10 | 20 | (Germany) Proton Competition | (Italy) Matteo Cressoni (Austria) Richard Lietz (Austria) Thomas Preining (Italy) Claudio Schiavoni | Porsche M97/80 4.2 L Flat-6 | 719 | +62 Laps |
| 29 | GTD | 4 | 57 | (United States) Winward Racing | (Austria) Lucas Auer (Netherlands) Indy Dontje (Switzerland) Philip Ellis (United States) Russell Ward | Mercedes-AMG GT3 Evo | 719 | +62 Laps |
| 29 | GTD | 4 | 57 | (United States) Winward Racing | (Austria) Lucas Auer (Netherlands) Indy Dontje (Switzerland) Philip Ellis (United States) Russell Ward | Mercedes-AMG M159 6.2 L V8 | 719 | +62 Laps |
| 30 | GTD | 5 | 96 | (United States) Turner Motorsport | (United States) Robby Foley (United States) Patrick Gallagher (Germany) Jens Klingmann (United States) Jake Walker | BMW M4 GT3 Evo | 719 | +62 Laps |
| 30 | GTD | 5 | 96 | (United States) Turner Motorsport | (United States) Robby Foley (United States) Patrick Gallagher (Germany) Jens Klingmann (United States) Jake Walker | BMW P58 3.0 L Twin-Turbo I6 | 719 | +62 Laps |
| 31 | GTD | 6 | 19 | (United States) van der Steur Racing | (France) Valentin Hasse-Clot (United States) Anthony McIntosh (France) Maxime Robin (United States) Rory van der Steur | Aston Martin Vantage AMR GT3 Evo | 719 | +62 Laps |
| 31 | GTD | 6 | 19 | (United States) van der Steur Racing | (France) Valentin Hasse-Clot (United States) Anthony McIntosh (France) Maxime Robin (United States) Rory van der Steur | Aston Martin M177 4.0 L Turbo V8 | 719 | +62 Laps |
| 32 | GTD | 7 | 50 | (Italy) AF Corse | (Italy) Riccardo Agostini (Denmark) Conrad Laursen (Monaco) Arthur Leclerc (Brazil) Custodio Toledo | Ferrari 296 GT3 | 719 | +62 Laps |
| 32 | GTD | 7 | 50 | (Italy) AF Corse | (Italy) Riccardo Agostini (Denmark) Conrad Laursen (Monaco) Arthur Leclerc (Brazil) Custodio Toledo | Ferrari F163CE 3.0 L Turbo V6 | 719 | +62 Laps |
| 33 | GTD | 8 | 83 | (Italy) Iron Dames | (Belgium) Sarah Bovy (Switzerland) Rahel Frey (Switzerland) Karen Gaillard (Denmark) Michelle Gatting | Porsche 911 GT3 R (992) | 719 | +62 Laps |
| 33 | GTD | 8 | 83 | (Italy) Iron Dames | (Belgium) Sarah Bovy (Switzerland) Rahel Frey (Switzerland) Karen Gaillard (Denmark) Michelle Gatting | Porsche M97/80 4.2 L Flat-6 | 719 | +62 Laps |
| 34 | GTD | 9 | 32 | (United States) Korthoff Competition Motors | (Germany) Maximilian Götz (United States) Kenton Koch (United States) Seth Lucas (Canada) Daniel Morad | Mercedes-AMG GT3 Evo | 719 | +62 Laps |
| 34 | GTD | 9 | 32 | (United States) Korthoff Competition Motors | (Germany) Maximilian Götz (United States) Kenton Koch (United States) Seth Lucas (Canada) Daniel Morad | Mercedes-AMG M159 6.2 L V8 | 719 | +62 Laps |
| 35 | GTD Pro | 11 | 14 | (United States) Vasser Sullivan Racing | (United Kingdom) Ben Barnicoat (United States) Townsend Bell (United States) Kyle Kirkwood (United States) Aaron Telitz | Lexus RC F GT3 | 704 | +77 Laps |
| 35 | GTD Pro | 11 | 14 | (United States) Vasser Sullivan Racing | (United Kingdom) Ben Barnicoat (United States) Townsend Bell (United States) Kyle Kirkwood (United States) Aaron Telitz | Toyota 2UR-GSE 5.4 L V8 | 704 | +77 Laps |
| 36 DNF | LMP2 | 7 | 88 | (Italy) AF Corse | (Denmark) Nicklas Nielsen (Argentina) Luis Pérez Companc (France) Matthieu Vaxivière (United States) Dylan Murry | Oreca 07 | 697 | Mechanical |
| 36 DNF | LMP2 | 7 | 88 | (Italy) AF Corse | (Denmark) Nicklas Nielsen (Argentina) Luis Pérez Companc (France) Matthieu Vaxivière (United States) Dylan Murry | Gibson GK428 4.2 L V8 | 697 | Mechanical |
| 37 DNF | GTD | 10 | 45 | (United States) Wayne Taylor Racing | (United States) Graham Doyle (Costa Rica) Danny Formal (United States) Trent Hindman (Canada) Kyle Marcelli | Lamborghini Huracán GT3 Evo 2 | 689 | Suspension |
| 37 DNF | GTD | 10 | 45 | (United States) Wayne Taylor Racing | (United States) Graham Doyle (Costa Rica) Danny Formal (United States) Trent Hindman (Canada) Kyle Marcelli | Lamborghini DGF 5.2 L V10 | 689 | Suspension |
| 38 | LMP2 | 8 | 11 | (France) TDS Racing | (Denmark) Mikkel Jensen (New Zealand) Hunter McElrea (France) Charles Milesi (United States) Steven Thomas | Oreca 07 | 682 | +99 Laps |
| 38 | LMP2 | 8 | 11 | (France) TDS Racing | (Denmark) Mikkel Jensen (New Zealand) Hunter McElrea (France) Charles Milesi (United States) Steven Thomas | Gibson GK428 4.2 L V8 | 682 | +99 Laps |
| 39 | LMP2 | 9 | 73 | (United States) Pratt Miller Motorsports | (Canada) Chris Cumming (Brazil) Pietro Fittipaldi (United Kingdom) Callum Ilott (Republic of Ireland) James Roe | Oreca 07 | 678 | +103 Laps |
| 39 | LMP2 | 9 | 73 | (United States) Pratt Miller Motorsports | (Canada) Chris Cumming (Brazil) Pietro Fittipaldi (United Kingdom) Callum Ilott (Republic of Ireland) James Roe | Gibson GK428 4.2 L V8 | 678 | +103 Laps |
| 40 | GTD | 11 | 34 | (United States) Conquest Racing | (Italy) Giacomo Altoè (United States) Manny Franco (Monaco) Cédric Sbirrazzuoli (Brazil) Daniel Serra | Ferrari 296 GT3 | 673 | +108 Laps |
| 40 | GTD | 11 | 34 | (United States) Conquest Racing | (Italy) Giacomo Altoè (United States) Manny Franco (Monaco) Cédric Sbirrazzuoli (Brazil) Daniel Serra | Ferrari F163CE 3.0 L Turbo V6 | 673 | +108 Laps |
| 41 | GTD Pro | 12 | 48 | (United States) Paul Miller Racing | (Brazil) Augusto Farfus (United Kingdom) Dan Harper (Germany) Max Hesse (Finland) Jesse Krohn | BMW M4 GT3 Evo | 668 | +113 Laps |
| 41 | GTD Pro | 12 | 48 | (United States) Paul Miller Racing | (Brazil) Augusto Farfus (United Kingdom) Dan Harper (Germany) Max Hesse (Finland) Jesse Krohn | BMW P58 3.0 L Twin-Turbo I6 | 668 | +113 Laps |
| 42 DNF | GTD | 12 | 78 | (United States) Forte Racing | (Germany) Mario Farnbacher (Canada) Misha Goikhberg (United States) Parker Kligerman (France) Franck Perera | Lamborghini Huracán GT3 Evo 2 | 591 | Accident damage |
| 42 DNF | GTD | 12 | 78 | (United States) Forte Racing | (Germany) Mario Farnbacher (Canada) Misha Goikhberg (United States) Parker Kligerman (France) Franck Perera | Lamborghini DGF 5.2 L V10 | 591 | Accident damage |
| 43 DNF | GTD | 13 | 80 | (United States) Lone Star Racing | (Australia) Scott Andrews (Estonia) Ralf Aron (United States) Eric Filgueiras (United States) Dan Knox | Mercedes-AMG GT3 Evo | 584 | Accident damage |
| 43 DNF | GTD | 13 | 80 | (United States) Lone Star Racing | (Australia) Scott Andrews (Estonia) Ralf Aron (United States) Eric Filgueiras (United States) Dan Knox | Mercedes-AMG M159 6.2 L V8 | 584 | Accident damage |
| 44 DNF | GTD | 14 | 12 | (United States) Vasser Sullivan Racing | (United Kingdom) Jack Hawksworth (United States) Kyle Kirkwood (United States) Frankie Montecalvo (Canada) Parker Thompson | Lexus RC F GT3 | 573 | Suspension |
| 44 DNF | GTD | 14 | 12 | (United States) Vasser Sullivan Racing | (United Kingdom) Jack Hawksworth (United States) Kyle Kirkwood (United States) Frankie Montecalvo (Canada) Parker Thompson | Toyota 2UR-GSE 5.0 L V8 | 573 | Suspension |
| 45 DNF | GTD | 15 | 023 | (United States) Triarsi Competizione | (Italy) Eddie Cheever III (Italy) Alessio Rovera (United States) Charlie Scardina (United States) Onofrio Triarsi | Ferrari 296 GT3 | 569 | Suspension |
| 45 DNF | GTD | 15 | 023 | (United States) Triarsi Competizione | (Italy) Eddie Cheever III (Italy) Alessio Rovera (United States) Charlie Scardina (United States) Onofrio Triarsi | Ferrari F163CE 3.0 L Turbo V6 | 569 | Suspension |
| 46 DNF | GTD | 16 | 21 | (Italy) AF Corse | (Japan) Kei Cozzolino (United States) Simon Mann (Italy) Alessandro Pier Guidi (France) Lilou Wadoux | Ferrari 296 GT3 | 555 | Accident |
| 46 DNF | GTD | 16 | 21 | (Italy) AF Corse | (Japan) Kei Cozzolino (United States) Simon Mann (Italy) Alessandro Pier Guidi (France) Lilou Wadoux | Ferrari F163CE 3.0 L Turbo V6 | 555 | Accident |
| 47 DNF | LMP2 | 10 | 43 | (Poland) Inter Europol Competition | (France) Tom Dillmann (Portugal) António Félix da Costa (United States) Jon Field (United States) Bijoy Garg | Oreca 07 | 430 | Gearbox |
| 47 DNF | LMP2 | 10 | 43 | (Poland) Inter Europol Competition | (France) Tom Dillmann (Portugal) António Félix da Costa (United States) Jon Field (United States) Bijoy Garg | Gibson GK428 4.2 L V8 | 430 | Gearbox |
| 48 DNF | GTD | 17 | 66 | (United States) Gradient Racing | (United Kingdom) Till Bechtolsheimer (Colombia) Tatiana Calderón (United States) Joey Hand (United Kingdom) Harry Tincknell | Ford Mustang GT3 | 425 | Clutch |
| 48 DNF | GTD | 17 | 66 | (United States) Gradient Racing | (United Kingdom) Till Bechtolsheimer (Colombia) Tatiana Calderón (United States) Joey Hand (United Kingdom) Harry Tincknell | Ford Coyote 5.4 L V8 | 425 | Clutch |
| 49 DNF | GTD | 18 | 70 | (United Kingdom) Inception Racing | (Italy) David Fumanelli (United States) Brendan Iribe (United Kingdom) Ollie Millroy (Denmark) Frederik Schandorff | Ferrari 296 GT3 | 392 | Steering arm |
| 49 DNF | GTD | 18 | 70 | (United Kingdom) Inception Racing | (Italy) David Fumanelli (United States) Brendan Iribe (United Kingdom) Ollie Millroy (Denmark) Frederik Schandorff | Ferrari F163CE 3.0 L Turbo V6 | 392 | Steering arm |
| 50 DNF | GTD | 19 | 36 | (United States) DXDT Racing | (Brazil) Pipo Derani (Republic of Ireland) Charlie Eastwood (United States) Alec Udell (Turkey) Salih Yoluç | Chevrolet Corvette Z06 GT3.R | 355 | Fire |
| 50 DNF | GTD | 19 | 36 | (United States) DXDT Racing | (Brazil) Pipo Derani (Republic of Ireland) Charlie Eastwood (United States) Alec Udell (Turkey) Salih Yoluç | Chevrolet LT6 5.5 L V8 | 355 | Fire |
| 51 DNF | GTP | 10 | 5 | (Germany) Proton Competition | (France) Julien Andlauer (Switzerland) Neel Jani (Chile) Nico Pino (France) Tristan Vautier | Porsche 963 | 352 | Suspension |
| 51 DNF | GTP | 10 | 5 | (Germany) Proton Competition | (France) Julien Andlauer (Switzerland) Neel Jani (Chile) Nico Pino (France) Tristan Vautier | Porsche 9RD 4.6 L Twin-Turbo V8 | 352 | Suspension |
| 52 DNF | GTD | 20 | 47 | (Italy) Cetilar Racing | (Italy) Antonio Fuoco (Italy) Nicola Lacorte (Italy) Roberto Lacorte (Italy) Lorenzo Patrese | Ferrari 296 GT3 | 336 | Electrical |
| 52 DNF | GTD | 20 | 47 | (Italy) Cetilar Racing | (Italy) Antonio Fuoco (Italy) Nicola Lacorte (Italy) Roberto Lacorte (Italy) Lorenzo Patrese | Ferrari F163CE 3.0 L Turbo V6 | 336 | Electrical |
| 53 DNF | GTP | 11 | 40 | (United States) Cadillac Wayne Taylor Racing | (Switzerland) Louis Delétraz (Japan) Kamui Kobayashi (United States) Jordan Taylor | Cadillac V-Series.R | 245 | Accident |
| 53 DNF | GTP | 11 | 40 | (United States) Cadillac Wayne Taylor Racing | (Switzerland) Louis Delétraz (Japan) Kamui Kobayashi (United States) Jordan Taylor | Cadillac LMC55R 5.5 L V8 | 245 | Accident |
| 54 DNF | LMP2 | 11 | 2 | (United States) United Autosports USA | (United States) Nick Boulle (United Kingdom) Ben Hanley (United Kingdom) Oliver Jarvis (Australia) Garnet Patterson | Oreca 07 | 239 | Accident |
| 54 DNF | LMP2 | 11 | 2 | (United States) United Autosports USA | (United States) Nick Boulle (United Kingdom) Ben Hanley (United Kingdom) Oliver Jarvis (Australia) Garnet Patterson | Gibson GK428 4.2 L V8 | 239 | Accident |
| 55 | LMP2 | 12 | 8 | (Canada) Tower Motorsports | (Mexico) Sebastián Álvarez (France) Sébastien Bourdais (Canada) John Farano (Netherlands) Job van Uitert | Oreca 07 | 765 | +16 Laps (Note: The No. 8 Tower Motorsports entry was found to be in violation of rules regarding the maximum wear on the skid plate after being examined in post-race inspection. By IMSA rules, the entry was moved to last in the LMP2 class.) |
| 55 | LMP2 | 12 | 8 | (Canada) Tower Motorsports | (Mexico) Sebastián Álvarez (France) Sébastien Bourdais (Canada) John Farano (Netherlands) Job van Uitert | Gibson GK428 4.2 L V8 | 765 | +16 Laps |
| 56 DNF | GTD Pro | 13 | 9 | (Canada) Pfaff Motorsports | (Italy) Andrea Caldarelli (Canada) James Hinchcliffe (Italy) Marco Mapelli (South Africa) Jordan Pepper | Lamborghini Huracán GT3 Evo 2 | 227 | Accident |
| 56 DNF | GTD Pro | 13 | 9 | (Canada) Pfaff Motorsports | (Italy) Andrea Caldarelli (Canada) James Hinchcliffe (Italy) Marco Mapelli (South Africa) Jordan Pepper | Lamborghini DGF 5.2 L V10 | 227 | Accident |
| 57 DNF | GTD Pro | 14 | 007 | (United States) Heart of Racing Team | (Canada) Roman De Angelis (United Kingdom) Ross Gunn (Spain) Alex Riberas (Denmark) Marco Sørensen | Aston Martin Vantage AMR GT3 Evo | 217 | Lost wheel |
| 57 DNF | GTD Pro | 14 | 007 | (United States) Heart of Racing Team | (Canada) Roman De Angelis (United Kingdom) Ross Gunn (Spain) Alex Riberas (Denmark) Marco Sørensen | Aston Martin M177 4.0 L Turbo V8 | 217 | Lost wheel |
| 58 DNF | GTD | 21 | 44 | (United States) Magnus Racing | (United States) Andy Lally (United States) John Potter (United States) Spencer Pumpelly (Denmark) Nicki Thiim | Aston Martin Vantage AMR GT3 Evo | 170 | Engine |
| 58 DNF | GTD | 21 | 44 | (United States) Magnus Racing | (United States) Andy Lally (United States) John Potter (United States) Spencer Pumpelly (Denmark) Nicki Thiim | Aston Martin M177 4.0 L Turbo V8 | 170 | Engine |
| 59 DNF | GTD | 22 | 021 | (United States) Triarsi Competizione | (United Kingdom) James Calado (United Kingdom) Stevan McAleer (United States) Sheena Monk (United States) Mike Skeen | Ferrari 296 GT3 | 688 | Contact (Note: The No. 021 Triarsi Competizione entry was found to have violated drive-time rules, with Stevan McAleer driving more than four hours within a six hour period. By IMSA rules, the No. 021 was moved to last in its class.) |
| 59 DNF | GTD | 22 | 021 | (United States) Triarsi Competizione | (United Kingdom) James Calado (United Kingdom) Stevan McAleer (United States) Sheena Monk (United States) Mike Skeen | Ferrari F163CE 3.0 L Turbo V6 | 688 | Contact |
| 60 DNF | GTD Pro | 15 | 75 | (Australia) 75 Express | (Germany) Maro Engel (Andorra) Jules Gounon (Canada) Mikaël Grenier (Australia) Kenny Habul | Mercedes-AMG GT3 Evo | 150 | Mechanical |
| 60 DNF | GTD Pro | 15 | 75 | (Australia) 75 Express | (Germany) Maro Engel (Andorra) Jules Gounon (Canada) Mikaël Grenier (Australia) Kenny Habul | Mercedes-AMG M159 6.2 L V8 | 150 | Mechanical |
| 61 DNF | GTP | 12 | 63 | (Italy) Automobili Lamborghini Squadra Corse | (Italy) Mirko Bortolotti (France) Romain Grosjean; Daniil Kvyat (Switzerland) Edoardo Mortara | Lamborghini SC63 | 34 | Overheating |
| 61 DNF | GTP | 12 | 63 | (Italy) Automobili Lamborghini Squadra Corse | (Italy) Mirko Bortolotti (France) Romain Grosjean; Daniil Kvyat (Switzerland) Edoardo Mortara | Lamborghini 3.8 L Turbo V8 | 34 | Overheating |
Provisional results

=== Fastest laps by class ===
| Class | Driver | Lap | Time |
|---|---|---|---|
| GTP | (South Africa) Sheldon van der Linde | 638 | 1:35.868 |
| LMP2 | (Denmark) Mikkel Jensen | 318 | 1:38.438 |
| GTD Pro | (United States) Madison Snow | 514 | 1:47.156 |
| GTD | (Germany) Marvin Kirchhöfer | 589 | 1:47.217 |

== Standings after the race ==
GTP Drivers' Championship standings
| Pos. | Driver | Points |
|---|---|---|
| 1 | (Brazil) Felipe Nasr (United Kingdom) Nick Tandy (Belgium) Laurens Vanthoor | 380 |
| 2 | (United Kingdom) Jack Aitken (United Kingdom) Tom Blomqvist (New Zealand) Scott Dixon (Sweden) Felix Rosenqvist | 345 |
| 3 | (France) Kévin Estre (France) Mathieu Jaminet (Australia) Matt Campbell | 321 |
| 4 | (Belgium) Dries Vanthoor (Denmark) Kevin Magnussen (Austria) Philipp Eng (Switzerland) Raffaele Marciello | 315 |
| 5 | (New Zealand) Brendon Hartley (Portugal) Filipe Albuquerque (United States) Ricky Taylor (United Kingdom) Will Stevens | 284 |

LMP2 Drivers' Championship standings
| Pos. | Driver | Points |
|---|---|---|
| 1 | (Australia) James Allen (United Kingdom) Paul di Resta (United States) Dan Goldburg (Sweden) Rasmus Lindh | 385 |
| 2 | (Australia) Josh Burdon (Brazil) Felipe Fraga (Brazil) Felipe Massa (United States) Gar Robinson | 343 |
| 3 | (Switzerland) Mathias Beche (United States) Ben Keating (Denmark) Benjamin Pedersen (United States) Rodrigo Sales | 332 |
| 4 | (France) Paul-Loup Chatin (United Kingdom) Ryan Dalziel (Denmark) David Heinemeier Hansson (Canada) Tobias Lütke | 300 |
| 5 | (United States) Dane Cameron (United Kingdom) Jonny Edgar (United States) P. J. Hyett (Denmark) Christian Rasmussen | 285 |

GTD Pro Drivers' Championship standings
| Pos. | Driver | Points |
|---|---|---|
| 1 | (Germany) Christopher Mies (Norway) Dennis Olsen (Belgium) Frédéric Vervisch | 382 |
| 2 | (Spain) Antonio García (Spain) Daniel Juncadella (United Kingdom) Alexander Sims | 348 |
| 3 | (United States) Austin Cindric (United Kingdom) Sebastian Priaulx (Germany) Mike Rockenfeller | 335 |
| 4 | (South Africa) Kelvin van der Linde (United States) Connor De Phillippi (United States) Madison Snow (United States) Neil Verhagen | 298 |
| 5 | (United States) Anthony Bartone (Belgium) Maxime Martin (Germany) Fabian Schiller (Germany) Luca Stolz | 280 |

GTD Drivers' Championship standings
| Pos. | Driver | Points |
|---|---|---|
| 1 | (United Kingdom) Matt Bell (Canada) Orey Fidani (Germany) Lars Kern (Germany) Marvin Kirchhöfer | 365 |
| 2 | (United States) Adam Adelson (Turkey) Ayhancan Güven (Australia) Tom Sargent (United States) Elliott Skeer | 355 |
| 3 | (Italy) Mattia Drudi (United Kingdom) Tom Gamble (Canada) Zacharie Robichon (United Kingdom) Casper Stevenson | 324 |
| 4 | (Austria) Lucas Auer (Netherlands) Indy Dontje (Switzerland) Philip Ellis (United States) Russell Ward | 312 |
| 5 | (United States) Robby Foley (United States) Patrick Gallagher (Germany) Jens Klingmann (United States) Jake Walker | 278 |

Note: Only the top five positions are included for all sets of standings.

GTP Teams' Championship standings
| Pos. | Team | Points |
|---|---|---|
| 1 | (Germany) #7 Porsche Penske Motorsport | 380 |
| 2 | (United States) #60 Acura Meyer Shank Racing w/ Curb-Agajanian | 345 |
| 3 | (Germany) #6 Porsche Penske Motorsport | 321 |
| 4 | (United States) #24 BMW M Team RLL | 315 |
| 5 | (United States) #10 Cadillac Wayne Taylor Racing | 284 |

LMP2 Teams' Championship standings
| Pos. | Team | Points |
|---|---|---|
| 1 | (United States) #22 United Autosports USA | 385 |
| 2 | (United States) #74 Riley | 343 |
| 3 | (United States) #52 PR1/Mathiasen Motorsports | 332 |
| 4 | (United States) #18 Era Motorsport | 300 |
| 5 | (United States) #99 AO Racing | 285 |

GTD Pro Teams' Championship standings
| Pos. | Team | Points |
|---|---|---|
| 1 | (United States) #65 Ford Multimatic Motorsports | 382 |
| 2 | (United States) #3 Corvette Racing by Pratt Miller Motorsports | 348 |
| 3 | (United States) #64 Ford Multimatic Motorsports | 335 |
| 4 | (United States) #1 Paul Miller Racing | 298 |
| 5 | (Germany) #69 GetSpeed Performance | 280 |

GTD Teams' Championship standings
| Pos. | Team | Points |
|---|---|---|
| 1 | (Canada) #13 AWA | 365 |
| 2 | (United States) #120 Wright Motorsports | 355 |
| 3 | (United States) #27 Heart of Racing Team | 324 |
| 4 | (United States) #57 Winward Racing | 312 |
| 5 | (United States) #96 Turner Motorsport | 278 |

Note: Only the top five positions are included for all sets of standings.

GTP Manufacturers' Championship standings
| Pos. | Manufacturer | Points |
|---|---|---|
| 1 | (Germany) Porsche | 380 |
| 2 | (Japan) Acura | 352 |
| 3 | (Germany) BMW | 335 |
| 4 | (United States) Cadillac | 308 |
| 5 | (Italy) Lamborghini | 286 |

GTD Pro Manufacturers' Championship standings
| Pos. | Manufacturer | Points |
|---|---|---|
| 1 | (United States) Ford | 385 |
| 2 | (United States) Chevrolet | 350 |
| 3 | (Germany) BMW | 332 |
| 4 | (Germany) Mercedes-AMG | 305 |
| 5 | (Italy) Ferrari | 283 |

GTD Manufacturers' Championship standings
| Pos. | Manufacturer | Points |
|---|---|---|
| 1 | (United States) Chevrolet | 373 |
| 2 | (Germany) Porsche | 355 |
| 3 | (United Kingdom) Aston Martin | 326 |
| 4 | (Germany) Mercedes-AMG | 312 |
| 5 | (Germany) BMW | 284 |

Note: Only the top five positions are included for all sets of standings.

IMSA SportsCar Championship
| Previous race: none | 2025 season | Next race: 12 Hours of Sebring |
