= 2025 SportsCar Grand Prix =

Eighth round of the 2025 IMSA SportsCar Championship season

The layout of Road America, where the race was held

The 2025 SportsCar Grand Prix (formally known as the 2025 Motul SportsCar Grand Prix) was a sports car race held at Road America near Elkhart Lake, Wisconsin, on August 3, 2025. It was the eighth round of the 2025 IMSA SportsCar Championship.

== Background ==
=== Preview ===
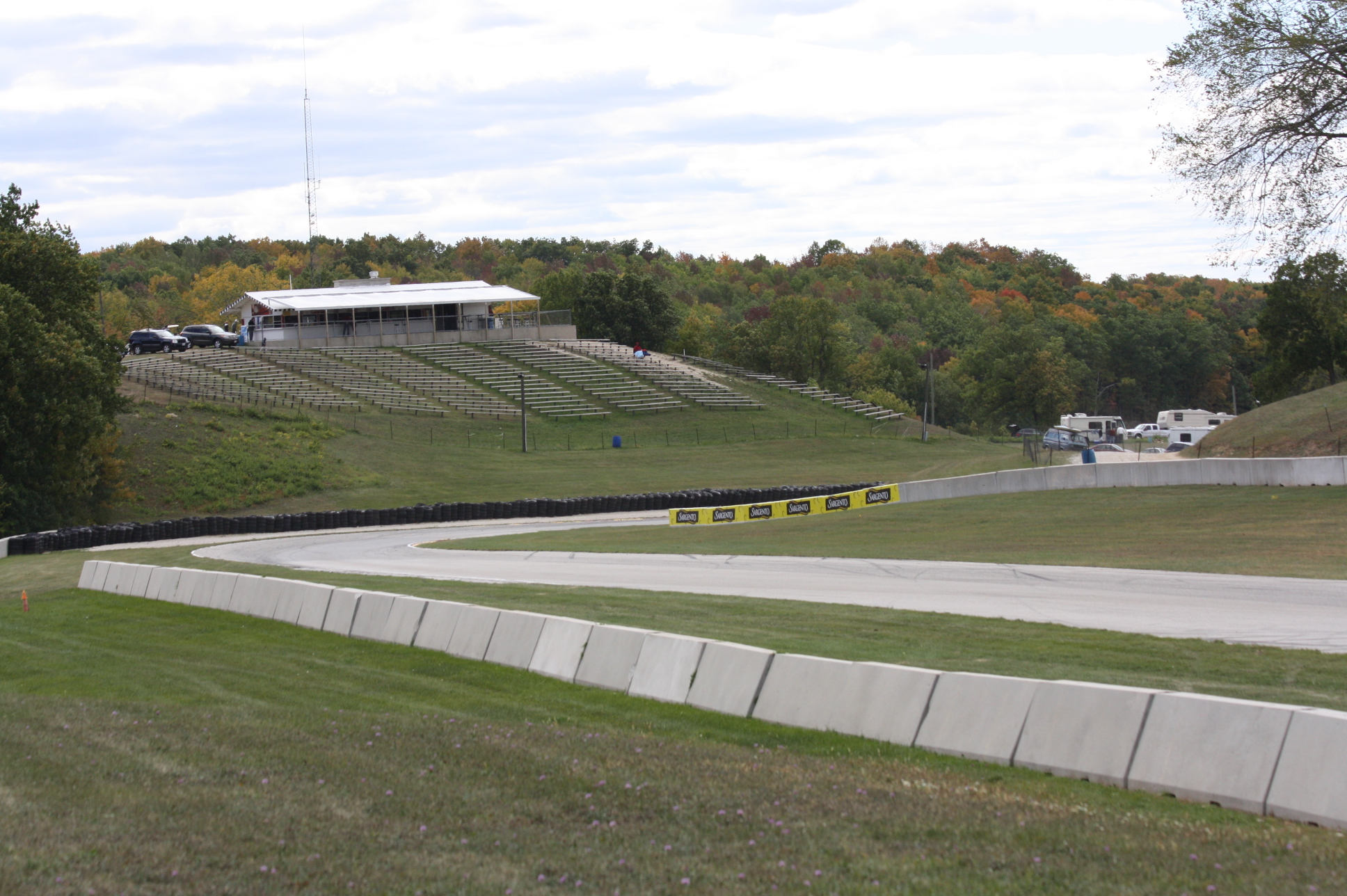
Road America, where the race was held

International Motor Sports Association (IMSA) president John Doonan confirmed the race was part of the schedule of the 2025 IMSA SportsCar Championship (IMSA SCC) in March 2024. It was the twelfth consecutive time the IMSA SCC hosted a race at Road America. The 2025 SportsCar Grand Prix was the eighth of eleven scheduled sports car races of 2025 by IMSA. The race was held at the fourteen-turn 4.048 mi (6.515 km) Road America on August 3, 2025.

=== Standings before the race ===
Preceding the event, Matt Campbell and Mathieu Jaminet led the GTD Drivers' Championship with 2028 points, 12 ahead of Porsche team-mates Felipe Nasr and Nick Tandy. Nick Yelloly and Renger van der Zande sat in third, 262 points behind Campbell and Jaminet. Dan Goldburg led the LMP2 Drivers' Championship with 1375 points, 78 points ahead of second-placed Dane Cameron and P. J. Hyett. The GTD Pro Drivers' Championship was led by Antonio García and Alexander Sims with 1942 points, 39 points ahead of Klaus Bachler and Laurin Heinrich in second. Albert Costa sat in third, a further 14 points behind. Philip Ellis and Russell Ward were in the lead of the GTD Drivers' Championship with 1902 points. Jack Hawksworth and Parker Thompson sat in second, 93 points behind Ellis and Ward. Casper Stevenson rounded out the top three, a further 31 points behind. Porsche Penske Motorsport, United Autosports USA, Corvette Racing by Pratt Miller Motorsports, and Winward Racing lead their respective Teams' Championships, with Porsche, Chevrolet, and Mercedes-AMG leading their respective Manufacturers' Championships.

== Entry list ==
The entry list was published on July 23, 2025, and featured 49 entries: 11 in GTP, 14 in LMP2, 10 in GTD Pro, and 14 in GTD. On July 31, 2025, Korthoff Competition Motors announced the withdrawal of their No. 32 Mercedes, which was initially entered for Daniel Morad and Mike Skeen, bringing the total amount of entries down to 48.

No.	Entrant	Car	Driver 1	Driver 2
GTP (Grand Touring Prototype) (11 entries)
6	(Germany) Porsche Penske Motorsport	Porsche 963	(Australia) Matt Campbell	(France) Mathieu Jaminet
7	(Germany) Porsche Penske Motorsport	Porsche 963	(Brazil) Felipe Nasr	(United Kingdom) Nick Tandy
10	(United States) Cadillac Wayne Taylor Racing	Cadillac V-Series.R	(Portugal) Filipe Albuquerque	(United States) Ricky Taylor
23	(United States) Aston Martin THOR Team	Aston Martin Valkyrie	(Canada) Roman De Angelis	(United Kingdom) Ross Gunn
24	(United States) BMW M Team RLL	BMW M Hybrid V8	(Austria) Philipp Eng	(Belgium) Dries Vanthoor
25	(United States) BMW M Team RLL	BMW M Hybrid V8	(South Africa) Sheldon van der Linde	(Germany) Marco Wittmann
31	(United States) Cadillac Whelen	Cadillac V-Series.R	(United Kingdom) Jack Aitken	(New Zealand) Earl Bamber
40	(United States) Cadillac Wayne Taylor Racing	Cadillac V-Series.R	(Switzerland) Louis Delétraz	(United States) Jordan Taylor
60	(United States) Acura Meyer Shank Racing w/ Curb-Agajanian	Acura ARX-06	(United Kingdom) Tom Blomqvist	(United States) Colin Braun
85	(United States) JDC–Miller MotorSports	Porsche 963	(Italy) Gianmaria Bruni	(Netherlands) Tijmen van der Helm
93	(United States) Acura Meyer Shank Racing w/ Curb-Agajanian	Acura ARX-06	(United Kingdom) Nick Yelloly	(Netherlands) Renger van der Zande
LMP2 (Le Mans Prototype 2) (14 entries)
04	(Portugal) CrowdStrike Racing by APR	Oreca 07-Gibson	(Denmark) Malthe Jakobsen	(United States) George Kurtz
2	(United States) United Autosports USA	Oreca 07-Gibson	(Canada) Phil Fayer	(United Kingdom) Ben Hanley
8	(Canada) Tower Motorsports	Oreca 07-Gibson	(France) Sébastien Bourdais	(Canada) John Farano
11	(France) TDS Racing	Oreca 07-Gibson	(Denmark) Mikkel Jensen	(United States) Steven Thomas
18	(United States) Era Motorsport	Oreca 07-Gibson	(Canada) Tobias Lütke	(Japan) Kakunoshin Ohta
22	(United States) United Autosports USA	Oreca 07-Gibson	(United States) Dan Goldburg	(United Kingdom) Paul di Resta
43	(Poland) Inter Europol Competition	Oreca 07-Gibson	(United States) Jeremy Clarke	(United States) Connor De Phillippi
52	(United States) PR1/Mathiasen Motorsports	Oreca 07-Gibson	(Denmark) Benjamin Pedersen	(United States) Naveen Rao
61	(United States) Team Tonis	Oreca 07-Gibson	(Australia) Matthew Brabham	(Estonia) Tõnis Kasemets
73	(United States) Pratt Miller Motorsports	Oreca 07-Gibson	(Canada) Chris Cumming	(Brazil) Pietro Fittipaldi
74	(United States) Riley	Oreca 07-Gibson	(Brazil) Felipe Fraga	(United States) Gar Robinson
79	(United States) JDC–Miller MotorSports	Oreca 07-Gibson	(Australia) Scott Andrews	(United States) Gerry Kraut
88	(Italy) AF Corse	Oreca 07-Gibson	(Argentina) Luis Pérez Companc	(Argentina) Matías Pérez Companc
99	(United States) AO Racing	Oreca 07-Gibson	(United States) Dane Cameron	(United States) P. J. Hyett
GTD Pro (GT Daytona Pro) (10 entries)
1	(United States) Paul Miller Racing	BMW M4 GT3 Evo	(United States) Madison Snow	(United States) Neil Verhagen
3	(United States) Corvette Racing by Pratt Miller Motorsports	Chevrolet Corvette Z06 GT3.R	(Spain) Antonio García	(United Kingdom) Alexander Sims
4	(United States) Corvette Racing by Pratt Miller Motorsports	Chevrolet Corvette Z06 GT3.R	(Netherlands) Nicky Catsburg	(United States) Tommy Milner
9	(Canada) Pfaff Motorsports	Lamborghini Huracán GT3 Evo 2	(Italy) Andrea Caldarelli	(Italy) Marco Mapelli
14	(United States) Vasser Sullivan Racing	Lexus RC F GT3	(United Kingdom) Ben Barnicoat	(United States) Aaron Telitz
48	(United States) Paul Miller Racing	BMW M4 GT3 Evo	(United Kingdom) Dan Harper	(Germany) Max Hesse
64	(Canada) Ford Multimatic Motorsports	Ford Mustang GT3	(United Kingdom) Sebastian Priaulx	(Germany) Mike Rockenfeller
65	(Canada) Ford Multimatic Motorsports	Ford Mustang GT3	(Germany) Christopher Mies	(Belgium) Frédéric Vervisch
77	(United States) AO Racing	Porsche 911 GT3 R (992)	(Austria) Klaus Bachler	(Germany) Laurin Heinrich
81	(United States) DragonSpeed	Ferrari 296 GT3	(Italy) Giacomo Altoè	(Spain) Albert Costa
GTD (GT Daytona) (13 entries)
021	(United States) Triarsi Competizione	Ferrari 296 GT3	(United States) Kenton Koch	(United States) Onofrio Triarsi
12	(United States) Vasser Sullivan Racing	Lexus RC F GT3	(United Kingdom) Jack Hawksworth	(Canada) Parker Thompson
13	(Canada) AWA	Chevrolet Corvette Z06 GT3.R	(United Kingdom) Matt Bell	(Canada) Orey Fidani
27	(United States) Heart of Racing Team	Aston Martin Vantage AMR GT3 Evo	(United Kingdom) Tom Gamble	(United Kingdom) Casper Stevenson
34	(United States) Conquest Racing	Ferrari 296 GT3	(United States) Manny Franco	(Brazil) Daniel Serra
36	(United States) DXDT Racing	Chevrolet Corvette Z06 GT3.R	(United States) Alec Udell	(Canada) Robert Wickens
45	(United States) Wayne Taylor Racing	Lamborghini Huracán GT3 Evo 2	(Costa Rica) Danny Formal	(United States) Trent Hindman
57	(United States) Winward Racing	Mercedes-AMG GT3 Evo	(Switzerland) Philip Ellis	(United States) Russell Ward
66	(United States) Gradient Racing	Ford Mustang GT3	(United States) Jenson Altzman	(United States) Robert Megennis
70	(United Kingdom) Inception Racing	Ferrari 296 GT3	(United States) Brendan Iribe	(Denmark) Frederik Schandorff
78	(United States) Forte Racing	Lamborghini Huracán GT3 Evo 2	(Germany) Mario Farnbacher	(Canada) Misha Goikhberg
96	(United States) Turner Motorsport	BMW M4 GT3 Evo	(United States) Robby Foley	(United States) Patrick Gallagher
120	(United States) Wright Motorsports	Porsche 911 GT3 R (992)	(United States) Adam Adelson	(United States) Elliott Skeer

== Practice ==
Two practice sessions were held preceding the start of the race on Sunday, one on Friday afternoon and one on Saturday morning. Both the session on Friday afternoon and on Saturday morning lasted 90 minutes.

=== Practice 1 ===
The first practice session took place at 2:00 pm CDT on Friday. Tom Blomqvist topped the session in the No. 60 Meyer Shank Racing Acura, with a 1-minute, 51.255-second lap time. Ross Gunn was second-quickest in the No. 23 Heart of Racing Team Aston Martin, 0.073 seconds behind Blomqvist. Jack Aitken rounded out the top three in the No. 31 Cadillac Whelen. Mikkel Jensen topped the LMP2 class in the No. 11 TDS Racing Oreca, with a lap time of 1:52.781. His lap was 0.365 seconds quicker than that of second-placed Paul di Resta in the No. 22 United Autosports USA Oreca. Russell Ward set the quickest time amongst all GT cars in the No. 57 Winward Racing Mercedes-AMG, with a lap time of 2:04.991. He was 0.748 seconds quicker than Parker Thompson in the No. 12 Vasser Sullivan Racing Lexus in second. Giacomo Altoè set the quickest time in the GTD Pro class, with a 2-minute, 5.844-second lap time. Nicky Catsburg was second-quickest in the No. 4 Corvette Racing Chevrolet. The session saw two red flag stoppages. The first was caused by the No. 22 Oreca, after Dan Goldburg got trapped in the gravel. The second was caused by Phil Fayer in the sister No. 2 United Oreca, after causing a collision with the No. 021 Triarsi Competizione Ferrari.

Pos.	Class	No.	Team	Driver	Time	Gap
1	GTP	60	(United States) Acura Meyer Shank Racing w/ Curb-Agajanian	(United Kingdom) Tom Blomqvist	1:51.255	—
2	GTP	23	(United States) Aston Martin THOR Team	(United Kingdom) Ross Gunn	1:51.328	+0.073
3	GTP	31	(United States) Cadillac Whelen	(United Kingdom) Jack Aitken	1:51.590	+0.335

=== Practice 2 ===
The second and final practice session took place at 9:05 am CDT on Saturday, and saw Dries Vanthoor topping the session in the No. 24 Team RLL BMW with a lap time of 1:49.676. He was 0.006 seconds quicker than second-placed Nick Yelloly in the No. 93 MSR Acura, with BMW team-mate Sheldon van der Linde rounding out the top three in the No. 25 BMW, 0.167 seconds behind Vanthoor. Malthe Jakobsen topped the LMP2 class in the No. 04 CrowdStrike Racing by APR Oreca, with a 1-minute, 52.823-second lap time. His lap was 0.029 seconds quicker than that of second-placed Jensen in the No. 11 Oreca, with Dane Cameron in the No. 99 AO Racing Oreca rounding out the top three. The GTD Pro class was topped by Alexander Sims in the No. 3 Chevrolet, with a lap time of 2:04.247. His lap was 0.107 seconds quicker Altoè's lap in the No. 81 Ferrari. Onofrio Triarsi topped the GTD class in the No. 021 Ferrari, with a 2-minute, 4.866-second lap time. The session saw a lengthy red flag after a collision between the No. 9 Pfaff Motorsports Lamborghini of Marco Mapelli and the No. 04 Oreca of George Kurtz.

Pos.	Class	No.	Team	Driver	Time	Gap
1	GTP	24	(United States) BMW M Team RLL	(Belgium) Dries Vanthoor	1:49.676	—
2	GTP	93	(United States) Acura Meyer Shank Racing w/ Curb-Agajanian	(United Kingdom) Nick Yelloly	1:49.682	+0.006
3	GTP	25	(United States) BMW M Team RLL	(South Africa) Sheldon van der Linde	1:49.843	+0.167

== Qualifying ==
Saturday's afternoon qualifying was broken into four sessions, with one session for the GTP, LMP2, GTD Pro, and GTD classes each. The rules dictated that all teams nominated a driver to qualify their cars, with the Pro-Am LMP2 class requiring a Bronze rated driver to qualify the car. The competitors' fastest lap times determined the starting order. The competitors' fastest lap times determined the starting order. IMSA then arranged the grid to put GTPs ahead of the LMP2, GTD Pro, and GTD cars.

=== Qualifying results ===
Pole positions in each class are indicated in bold and with ‡.

Pos.	Class	No.	Entry	Driver	Time	Gap	Grid
1	**GTP**	**93**	**(United States) Acura Meyer Shank Racing w/ Curb-Agajanian**	**(United Kingdom) Nick Yelloly**	**1:48.628**	—	1‡
2	GTP	25	(United States) BMW M Team RLL	(South Africa) Sheldon van der Linde	1:48.681	+0.053	2
3	GTP	24	(United States) BMW M Team RLL	(Belgium) Dries Vanthoor	1:48.683	+0.055	3
4	GTP	60	(United States) Acura Meyer Shank Racing w/ Curb-Agajanian	(United States) Colin Braun	1:48.708	+0.080	4
5	GTP	6	(Germany) Porsche Penske Motorsport	(Australia) Matt Campbell	1:48.960	+0.332	5
6	GTP	31	(United States) Cadillac Whelen	(United Kingdom) Jack Aitken	1:49.118	+0.490	6
7	GTP	10	(United States) Cadillac Wayne Taylor Racing	(Portugal) Filipe Albuquerque	1:49.121	+0.493	7
8	GTP	7	(Germany) Porsche Penske Motorsport	(Brazil) Felipe Nasr	1:49.171	+0.543	8
9	GTP	40	(United States) Cadillac Wayne Taylor Racing	(United States) Jordan Taylor	1:49.263	+0.635	9
10	GTP	23	(United States) Aston Martin THOR Team	(United Kingdom) Ross Gunn	1:49.309	+0.681	10
11	GTP	85	(United States) JDC–Miller MotorSports	(Italy) Gianmaria Bruni	1:50.367	+1.739	11
12	**LMP2**	**99**	**(United States) AO Racing**	**(United States) P. J. Hyett**	**1:53.240**	**+4.612**	12‡
13	LMP2	04	(Portugal) CrowdStrike Racing by APR	(United States) George Kurtz	1:53.906	+5.278	13
14	LMP2	22	(United States) United Autosports USA	(United States) Dan Goldburg	1:54.323	+5.695	14
15	LMP2	61	(United States) Team Tonis	(Estonia) Tõnis Kasemets	1:54.377	+5.749	15
16	LMP2	11	(France) TDS Racing	(United States) Steven Thomas	1:54.685	+6.057	16
17	LMP2	18	(United States) Era Motorsport	(Canada) Tobias Lütke	1:54.908	+6.280	17
18	LMP2	2	(United States) United Autosports USA	(Canada) Phil Fayer	1:55.108	+6.480	18
19	LMP2	88	(Italy) AF Corse	(Argentina) Luis Pérez Companc	1:55.117	+6.489	19
20	LMP2	52	(United States) PR1/Mathiasen Motorsports	(United States) Naveen Rao	1:55.410	+6.782	20
21	LMP2	43	(Poland) Inter Europol Competition	(United States) Jeremy Clarke	1:55.459	+6.831	21
22	LMP2	74	(United States) Riley	(United States) Gar Robinson	1:55.517	+6.889	22
23	LMP2	73	(United States) Pratt Miller Motorsports	(Canada) Chris Cumming	1:55.854	+7.226	23
24	LMP2	8	(Canada) Tower Motorsports	(Canada) John Farano	1:56.683	+8.055	24
25	LMP2	79	(United States) JDC–Miller MotorSports	(United States) Gerry Kraut	1:59.392	+10.764	25
26	**GTD**	**57**	**(United States) Winward Racing**	**(United States) Russell Ward**	**2:03.745**	**+15.117**	36‡
27	**GTD Pro**	**81**	**(United States) DragonSpeed**	**(Italy) Giacomo Altoè**	**2:03.904**	**+15.276**	26‡
28	GTD	27	(United States) Heart of Racing Team	(United Kingdom) Casper Stevenson	2:03.908	+15.280	37
29	GTD Pro	3	(United States) Corvette Racing by Pratt Miller Motorsports	(United Kingdom) Alexander Sims	2:03.914	+15.286	27
30	GTD Pro	4	(United States) Corvette Racing by Pratt Miller Motorsports	(United States) Tommy Milner	2:03.924	+15.296	28
31	GTD	021	(United States) Triarsi Competizione	(United States) Onofrio Triarsi	2:04.160	+15.532	38
32	GTD	36	(United States) DXDT Racing	(Canada) Robert Wickens	2:04.208	+15.580	39
33	GTD	12	(United States) Vasser Sullivan Racing	(Canada) Parker Thompson	2:04.494	+15.866	40
34	GTD	34	(United States) Conquest Racing	(United States) Manny Franco	2:04.602	+15.974	41
35	GTD Pro	48	(United States) Paul Miller Racing	(United Kingdom) Dan Harper	2:04.610	+15.982	29
36	GTD	45	(United States) Wayne Taylor Racing	(Costa Rica) Danny Formal	2:04.625	+15.997	42
37	GTD Pro	1	(United States) Paul Miller Racing	(United States) Madison Snow	2:04.644	+16.016	30
38	GTD Pro	65	(Canada) Ford Multimatic Motorsports	(Germany) Christopher Mies	2:05.089	+16.641	31
39	GTD	78	(United States) Forte Racing	(Canada) Misha Goikhberg	2:05.107	+16.479	43
40	GTD	70	(United Kingdom) Inception Racing	(United States) Brendan Iribe	2:05.231	+16.603	44
41	GTD Pro	77	(United States) AO Racing	(Austria) Klaus Bachler	2:05.411	+16.783	32
42	GTD Pro	64	(Canada) Ford Multimatic Motorsports	(Germany) Mike Rockenfeller	2:05.419	+16.791	33
43	GTD Pro	14	(United States) Vasser Sullivan Racing	(United States) Aaron Telitz	2:05.590	+16.962	34
44	GTD	96	(United States) Turner Motorsport	(United States) Patrick Gallagher	2:05.936	+17.308	45
45	GTD	66	(United States) Gradient Racing	(United States) Jenson Altzman	2:06.295	+17.667	46
46	GTD	120	(United States) Wright Motorsports	(United States) Adam Adelson	2:06.341	+17.713	47
47	GTD	13	(Canada) AWA	(Canada) Orey Fidani	2:07.072	+18.444	48
48	GTD Pro	9	(Canada) Pfaff Motorsports	No Time Established			35

== Race ==
=== Post-race ===
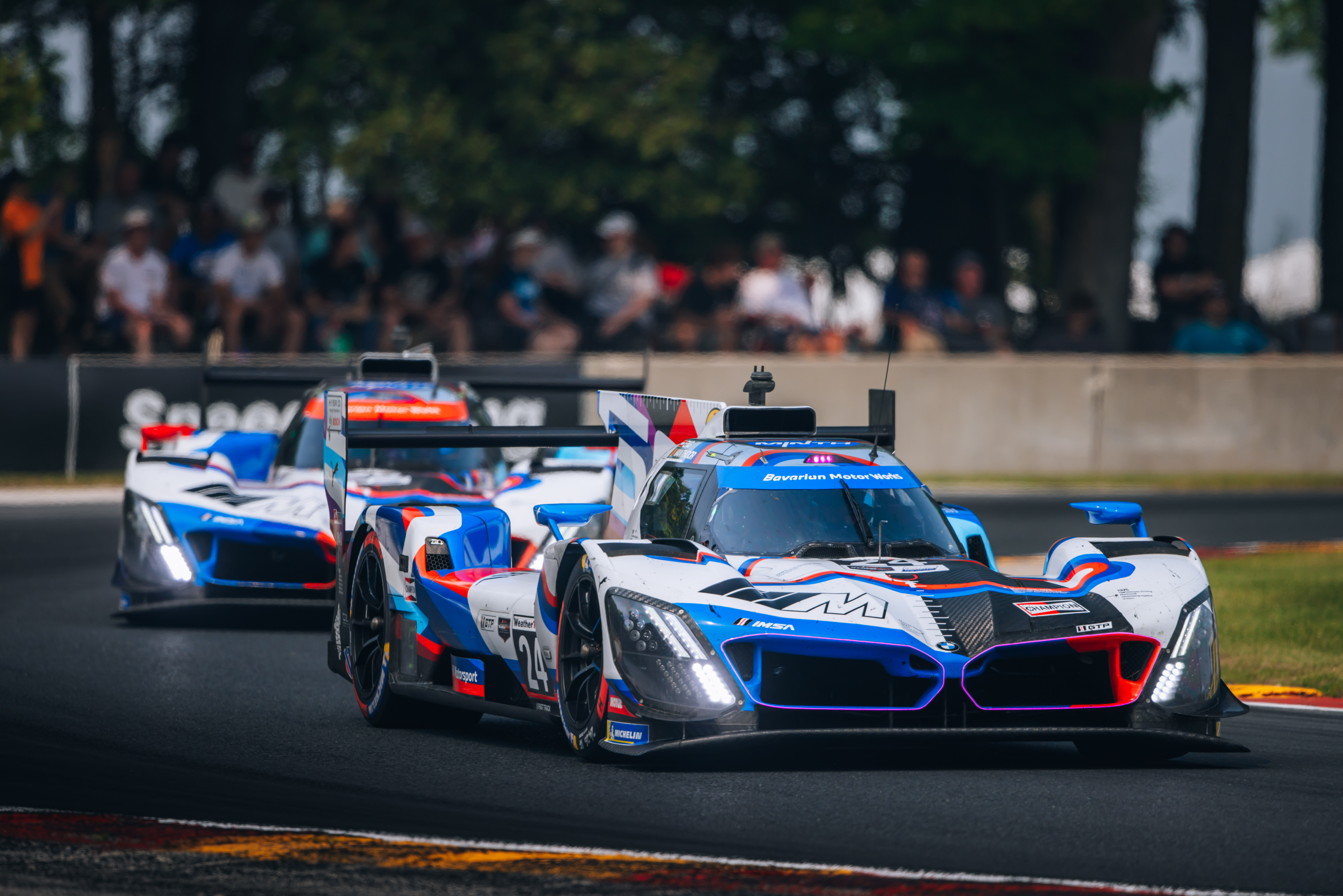
BMW completed a 1–2 finish in the GTP class.

The final results GTP allowed Campbell and Jaminet to extend their advantage in the GTP Drivers' Championship by 63 points over teammates Nasr and Tandy. As a result of winning the race, Cameron and Hyett took the lead of the LMP2 Drivers' Championship with 1682 points. The final results of GTD Pro kept García and Sims atop the GTD Pro Drivers' Championship. The final results of GTD allowed Ellis and ward to extend their advantage in the GTD Drivers' Championship to 112 points over Hawksworth and Thompson. Porsche Penske Motorsport, Corvette Racing by Pratt Miller Motorsports, and Winward Racing continued to top their respective Teams' Championships while AO Racing took the lead of the LMP2 Teams' Championship. Porsche, Chevrolet and Mercedes-AMG continued to their Manufacturers' Championship with 3 rounds remaining in the season.

Class winners are in bold and ‡.

Pos	Class	No	Team	Drivers	Chassis	Laps	Time/Retired
Pos	Class	No	Team	Drivers	Engine	Laps	Time/Retired
1	**GTP**	**24**	**(United States) BMW M Team RLL**	**(Austria) Philipp Eng** **(Belgium) Dries Vanthoor**	**BMW M Hybrid V8**	**66**	**2:40:20.740‡**
1	**GTP**	**24**	**(United States) BMW M Team RLL**	**(Austria) Philipp Eng** **(Belgium) Dries Vanthoor**	**BMW P66/3 4.0 L turbo V8**	**66**	**2:40:20.740‡**
2	GTP	25	(United States) BMW M Team RLL	(Germany) Marco Wittmann (South Africa) Sheldon van der Linde	BMW M Hybrid V8	66	+2.524
2	GTP	25	(United States) BMW M Team RLL	(Germany) Marco Wittmann (South Africa) Sheldon van der Linde	BMW P66/3 4.0 L turbo V8	66	+2.524
3	GTP	93	(United States) Acura Meyer Shank Racing w/ Curb-Agajanian	(Netherlands) Renger van der Zande (United Kingdom) Nick Yelloly	Acura ARX-06	66	+3.628
3	GTP	93	(United States) Acura Meyer Shank Racing w/ Curb-Agajanian	(Netherlands) Renger van der Zande (United Kingdom) Nick Yelloly	Acura AR24e 2.4 L turbo V6	66	+3.628
4	GTP	31	(United States) Cadillac Whelen	(United Kingdom) Jack Aitken (New Zealand) Earl Bamber	Cadillac V-Series.R	66	+15.464
4	GTP	31	(United States) Cadillac Whelen	(United Kingdom) Jack Aitken (New Zealand) Earl Bamber	Cadillac LMC55R 5.5 L V8	66	+15.464
5	GTP	6	(Germany) Porsche Penske Motorsport	(France) Mathieu Jaminet (Australia) Matt Campbell	Porsche 963	66	+15.848
5	GTP	6	(Germany) Porsche Penske Motorsport	(France) Mathieu Jaminet (Australia) Matt Campbell	Porsche 9RD 4.6 L turbo V8	66	+15.848
6	GTP	23	(United States) Aston Martin THOR Team	(United Kingdom) Ross Gunn (Canada) Roman De Angelis	Aston Martin Valkyrie	66	+16.576
6	GTP	23	(United States) Aston Martin THOR Team	(United Kingdom) Ross Gunn (Canada) Roman De Angelis	Aston Martin RA 6.5 L V12	66	+16.576
7	GTP	60	(United States) Acura Meyer Shank Racing w/ Curb-Agajanian	(United Kingdom) Tom Blomqvist (United States) Colin Braun	Acura ARX-06	66	+19.671
7	GTP	60	(United States) Acura Meyer Shank Racing w/ Curb-Agajanian	(United Kingdom) Tom Blomqvist (United States) Colin Braun	Acura AR24e 2.4 L turbo V6	66	+19.671
8	GTP	10	(United States) Cadillac Wayne Taylor Racing	(United States) Ricky Taylor (Portugal) Filipe Albuquerque	Cadillac V-Series.R	66	+23.867
8	GTP	10	(United States) Cadillac Wayne Taylor Racing	(United States) Ricky Taylor (Portugal) Filipe Albuquerque	Cadillac LMC55R 5.5 L V8	66	+23.867
9	GTP	40	(United States) Cadillac Wayne Taylor Racing	(United States) Jordan Taylor (Switzerland) Louis Delétraz	Cadillac V-Series.R	66	+24.480
9	GTP	40	(United States) Cadillac Wayne Taylor Racing	(United States) Jordan Taylor (Switzerland) Louis Delétraz	Cadillac LMC55R 5.5 L V8	66	+24.480
10	GTP	85	(United States) JDC–Miller MotorSports	(Netherlands) Tijmen van der Helm (Italy) Gianmaria Bruni	Porsche 963	66	+37.098
10	GTP	85	(United States) JDC–Miller MotorSports	(Netherlands) Tijmen van der Helm (Italy) Gianmaria Bruni	Porsche 9RD 4.6 L turbo V8	66	+37.098
11	**LMP2**	**99**	**(United States) AO Racing**	**(United States) P. J. Hyett** **(United States) Dane Cameron**	**Oreca 07**	**66**	**+46.652‡**
11	**LMP2**	**99**	**(United States) AO Racing**	**(United States) P. J. Hyett** **(United States) Dane Cameron**	**Gibson GK428 4.2 L V8**	**66**	**+46.652‡**
12	LMP2	43	(Poland) Inter Europol Competition	(United States) Connor De Phillippi (United States) Jeremy Clarke	Oreca 07	66	+50.819
12	LMP2	43	(Poland) Inter Europol Competition	(United States) Connor De Phillippi (United States) Jeremy Clarke	Gibson GK428 4.2 L V8	66	+50.819
13	LMP2	11	(France) TDS Racing	(United States) Steven Thomas (Denmark) Mikkel Jensen	Oreca 07	66	+59.103
13	LMP2	11	(France) TDS Racing	(United States) Steven Thomas (Denmark) Mikkel Jensen	Gibson GK428 4.2 L V8	66	+59.103
14	LMP2	2	(United States) United Autosports USA	(Canada) Phil Fayer (United Kingdom) Ben Hanley	Oreca 07	66	+1:05.447
14	LMP2	2	(United States) United Autosports USA	(Canada) Phil Fayer (United Kingdom) Ben Hanley	Gibson GK428 4.2 L V8	66	+1:05.447
15	LMP2	18	(United States) Era Motorsport	(Canada) Tobias Lütke (Japan) Kakunoshin Ohta	Oreca 07	66	+1:05.933
15	LMP2	18	(United States) Era Motorsport	(Canada) Tobias Lütke (Japan) Kakunoshin Ohta	Gibson GK428 4.2 L V8	66	+1:05.933
16	LMP2	04	(Portugal) CrowdStrike Racing by APR	(United States) George Kurtz (Denmark) Malthe Jakobsen	Oreca 07	66	+1:08.290
16	LMP2	04	(Portugal) CrowdStrike Racing by APR	(United States) George Kurtz (Denmark) Malthe Jakobsen	Gibson GK428 4.2 L V8	66	+1:08.290
17	LMP2	8	(Canada) Tower Motorsports	(Canada) John Farano (France) Sébastien Bourdais	Oreca 07	66	+1:08.757
17	LMP2	8	(Canada) Tower Motorsports	(Canada) John Farano (France) Sébastien Bourdais	Gibson GK428 4.2 L V8	66	+1:08.757
18	LMP2	73	(United States) Pratt Miller Motorsports	(Brazil) Pietro Fittipaldi (Canada) Chris Cumming	Oreca 07	66	+1:14.747
18	LMP2	73	(United States) Pratt Miller Motorsports	(Brazil) Pietro Fittipaldi (Canada) Chris Cumming	Gibson GK428 4.2 L V8	66	+1:14.747
19	LMP2	79	(United States) JDC–Miller MotorSports	(United States) Gerry Kraut (Australia) Scott Andrews	Oreca 07	66	+1:15.248
19	LMP2	79	(United States) JDC–Miller MotorSports	(United States) Gerry Kraut (Australia) Scott Andrews	Gibson GK428 4.2 L V8	66	+1:15.248
20	LMP2	61	(United States) Team Tonis	(Estonia) Tõnis Kasemets (Australia) Matthew Brabham	Oreca 07	66	+1:19.717
20	LMP2	61	(United States) Team Tonis	(Estonia) Tõnis Kasemets (Australia) Matthew Brabham	Gibson GK428 4.2 L V8	66	+1:19.717
21	LMP2	74	(United States) Riley	(United States) Gar Robinson (Brazil) Felipe Fraga	Oreca 07	66	+1:24.214
21	LMP2	74	(United States) Riley	(United States) Gar Robinson (Brazil) Felipe Fraga	Gibson GK428 4.2 L V8	66	+1:24.214
22	GTP	7	(Germany) Porsche Penske Motorsport	(Brazil) Felipe Nasr (United Kingdom) Nick Tandy	Porsche 963	66	+1:43.648
22	GTP	7	(Germany) Porsche Penske Motorsport	(Brazil) Felipe Nasr (United Kingdom) Nick Tandy	Porsche 9RD 4.6 L turbo V8	66	+1:43.648
23 DNF	LMP2	88	(Italy) AF Corse	(Argentina) Luis Pérez Companc (Argentina) Matías Pérez Companc	Oreca 07	65	Did not finish
23 DNF	LMP2	88	(Italy) AF Corse	(Argentina) Luis Pérez Companc (Argentina) Matías Pérez Companc	Gibson GK428 4.2 L V8	65	Did not finish
24	**GTD Pro**	**1**	**(United States) Paul Miller Racing**	**(United States) Madison Snow** **(United States) Neil Verhagen**	**BMW M4 GT3 Evo**	**62**	**+4 Laps‡**
24	**GTD Pro**	**1**	**(United States) Paul Miller Racing**	**(United States) Madison Snow** **(United States) Neil Verhagen**	**BMW P58 3.0 L Turbo I6**	**62**	**+4 Laps‡**
25	GTD Pro	64	(Canada) Ford Multimatic Motorsports	(Germany) Mike Rockenfeller (United Kingdom) Sebastian Priaulx	Ford Mustang GT3	62	+4 Laps
25	GTD Pro	64	(Canada) Ford Multimatic Motorsports	(Germany) Mike Rockenfeller (United Kingdom) Sebastian Priaulx	Ford Coyote 5.4 L V8	62	+4 Laps
26	GTD Pro	81	(United States) DragonSpeed	(Spain) Albert Costa (Italy) Giacomo Altoè	Ferrari 296 GT3	62	+4 Laps
26	GTD Pro	81	(United States) DragonSpeed	(Spain) Albert Costa (Italy) Giacomo Altoè	Ferrari F163CE 3.0 L Turbo V6	62	+4 Laps
27	**GTD**	**021**	**(United States) Triarsi Competizione**	**(United States) Onofrio Triarsi** **(United States) Kenton Koch**	**Ferrari 296 GT3**	**62**	**+4 Laps‡**
27	**GTD**	**021**	**(United States) Triarsi Competizione**	**(United States) Onofrio Triarsi** **(United States) Kenton Koch**	**Ferrari F163CE 3.0 L Turbo V6**	**62**	**+4 Laps‡**
28	GTD	78	(United States) Forte Racing	(Canada) Misha Goikhberg (Germany) Mario Farnbacher	Lamborghini Huracán GT3 Evo 2	62	+4 Laps
28	GTD	78	(United States) Forte Racing	(Canada) Misha Goikhberg (Germany) Mario Farnbacher	Lamborghini DGF 5.2 L V10	62	+4 Laps
29	GTD Pro	3	(United States) Corvette Racing by Pratt Miller Motorsports	(Spain) Antonio García (United Kingdom) Alexander Sims	Chevrolet Corvette Z06 GT3.R	62	+4 Laps
29	GTD Pro	3	(United States) Corvette Racing by Pratt Miller Motorsports	(Spain) Antonio García (United Kingdom) Alexander Sims	Chevrolet LT6 5.5 L V8	62	+4 Laps
30	GTD	34	(United States) Conquest Racing	(United States) Manny Franco (Brazil) Daniel Serra	Ferrari 296 GT3	62	+4 Laps
30	GTD	34	(United States) Conquest Racing	(United States) Manny Franco (Brazil) Daniel Serra	Ferrari F163CE 3.0 L Turbo V6	62	+4 Laps
31	GTD	96	(United States) Turner Motorsport	(United States) Patrick Gallagher (United States) Robby Foley	BMW M4 GT3 Evo	62	+4 Laps
31	GTD	96	(United States) Turner Motorsport	(United States) Patrick Gallagher (United States) Robby Foley	BMW P58 3.0 L Turbo I6	62	+4 Laps
32	GTD	45	(United States) Wayne Taylor Racing	(Costa Rica) Danny Formal (United States) Trent Hindman	Lamborghini Huracán GT3 Evo 2	62	+4 Laps
32	GTD	45	(United States) Wayne Taylor Racing	(Costa Rica) Danny Formal (United States) Trent Hindman	Lamborghini DGF 5.2 L V10	62	+4 Laps
33	GTD Pro	65	(Canada) Ford Multimatic Motorsports	(Germany) Christopher Mies (Belgium) Frédéric Vervisch	Ford Mustang GT3	62	+4 Laps
33	GTD Pro	65	(Canada) Ford Multimatic Motorsports	(Germany) Christopher Mies (Belgium) Frédéric Vervisch	Ford Coyote 5.4 L V8	62	+4 Laps
34	GTD	120	(United States) Wright Motorsports	(United States) Adam Adelson (United States) Elliott Skeer	Porsche 911 GT3 R (992)	62	+4 Laps
34	GTD	120	(United States) Wright Motorsports	(United States) Adam Adelson (United States) Elliott Skeer	Porsche M97/80 4.2 L Flat-6	62	+4 Laps
35	GTD	13	(Canada) AWA	(Canada) Orey Fidani (United Kingdom) Matt Bell	Chevrolet Corvette Z06 GT3.R	62	+4 Laps
35	GTD	13	(Canada) AWA	(Canada) Orey Fidani (United Kingdom) Matt Bell	Chevrolet LT6 5.5 L V8	62	+4 Laps
36	GTD	36	(United States) DXDT Racing	(Canada) Robert Wickens (United States) Alec Udell	Chevrolet Corvette Z06 GT3.R	62	+4 Laps
36	GTD	36	(United States) DXDT Racing	(Canada) Robert Wickens (United States) Alec Udell	Chevrolet LT6 5.5 L V8	62	+4 Laps
37	GTD	27	(United States) Heart of Racing Team	(United Kingdom) Tom Gamble (United Kingdom) Casper Stevenson	Aston Martin Vantage AMR GT3 Evo	62	+4 Laps
37	GTD	27	(United States) Heart of Racing Team	(United Kingdom) Tom Gamble (United Kingdom) Casper Stevenson	Aston Martin M177 4.0 L Turbo V8	62	+4 Laps
38	GTD	57	(United States) Winward Racing	(United States) Russell Ward (Switzerland) Philip Ellis	Mercedes-AMG GT3 Evo	62	+4 Laps
38	GTD	57	(United States) Winward Racing	(United States) Russell Ward (Switzerland) Philip Ellis	Mercedes-Benz M159 6.2 L V8	62	+4 Laps
39	GTD Pro	9	(Canada) Pfaff Motorsports	(Italy) Andrea Caldarelli (Italy) Marco Mapelli	Lamborghini Huracán GT3 Evo 2	62	+4 Laps
39	GTD Pro	9	(Canada) Pfaff Motorsports	(Italy) Andrea Caldarelli (Italy) Marco Mapelli	Lamborghini DGF 5.2 L V10	62	+4 Laps
40	GTD	12	(United States) Vasser Sullivan Racing	(United Kingdom) Jack Hawksworth (Canada) Parker Thompson	Lexus RC F GT3	62	+4 Laps
40	GTD	12	(United States) Vasser Sullivan Racing	(United Kingdom) Jack Hawksworth (Canada) Parker Thompson	Toyota 2UR-GSE 5.4 L V8	62	+4 Laps
41	GTD Pro	48	(United States) Paul Miller Racing	(Germany) Max Hesse (United Kingdom) Dan Harper	BMW M4 GT3 Evo	62	+4 Laps
41	GTD Pro	48	(United States) Paul Miller Racing	(Germany) Max Hesse (United Kingdom) Dan Harper	BMW P58 3.0 L Turbo I6	62	+4 Laps
42	GTD Pro	77	(United States) AO Racing	(Germany) Laurin Heinrich (Austria) Klaus Bachler	Porsche 911 GT3 R (992)	62	+4 Laps
42	GTD Pro	77	(United States) AO Racing	(Germany) Laurin Heinrich (Austria) Klaus Bachler	Porsche M97/80 4.2 L Flat-6	62	+4 Laps
43	GTD Pro	14	(United States) Vasser Sullivan Racing	(United Kingdom) Ben Barnicoat (United States) Aaron Telitz	Lexus RC F GT3	62	+4 Laps
43	GTD Pro	14	(United States) Vasser Sullivan Racing	(United Kingdom) Ben Barnicoat (United States) Aaron Telitz	Toyota 2UR-GSE 5.4 L V8	62	+4 Laps
44 DNF	GTD Pro	4	(United States) Corvette Racing by Pratt Miller Motorsports	(United States) Tommy Milner (Netherlands) Nicky Catsburg	Chevrolet Corvette Z06 GT3.R	56	Water Leak
44 DNF	GTD Pro	4	(United States) Corvette Racing by Pratt Miller Motorsports	(United States) Tommy Milner (Netherlands) Nicky Catsburg	Chevrolet LT6 5.5 L V8	56	Water Leak
45 DNF	GTD	66	(United States) Gradient Racing	(United States) Jenson Altzman (United States) Robert Megennis	Ford Mustang GT3	26	Accident
45 DNF	GTD	66	(United States) Gradient Racing	(United States) Jenson Altzman (United States) Robert Megennis	Ford Coyote 5.4 L V8	26	Accident
46 DNF	LMP2	52	(United States) PR1/Mathiasen Motorsports	(United States) Naveen Rao (Denmark) Benjamin Pedersen	Oreca 07	21	Accident
46 DNF	LMP2	52	(United States) PR1/Mathiasen Motorsports	(United States) Naveen Rao (Denmark) Benjamin Pedersen	Gibson GK428 4.2 L V8	21	Accident
47	LMP2	22	(United States) United Autosports USA	(United States) Dan Goldburg (United Kingdom) Paul di Resta	Oreca 07	21	+45 Laps
47	LMP2	22	(United States) United Autosports USA	(United States) Dan Goldburg (United Kingdom) Paul di Resta	Gibson GK428 4.2 L V8	21	+45 Laps
48 DNF	GTD	70	(United Kingdom) Inception Racing	(United States) Brendan Iribe (Denmark) Frederik Schandorff	Ferrari 296 GT3	4	Accident
48 DNF	GTD	70	(United Kingdom) Inception Racing	(United States) Brendan Iribe (Denmark) Frederik Schandorff	Ferrari F163CE 3.0 L Turbo V6	4	Accident

== Standings after the race ==
GTP Drivers' Championship standings
Pos.	+/–	Driver	Points
1		(France) Mathieu Jaminet (Australia) Matt Campbell	2314
2		(Brazil) Felipe Nasr (United Kingdom) Nick Tandy	2239
3	1	(Austria) Philipp Eng (Belgium) Dries Vanthoor	2133
4	1	(United Kingdom) Nick Yelloly (Netherlands) Renger van der Zande	2101
5		(Portugal) Filipe Albuquerque (United States) Ricky Taylor	2003

LMP2 Drivers' Championship standings
Pos.	+/–	Driver	Points
1	1	(United States) Dane Cameron (United States) P. J. Hyett	1682
2	1	(United States) Dan Goldburg	1575
3		(Brazil) Felipe Fraga (United States) Gar Robinson	1471
4	2	(United States) Steven Thomas	1409
5		(United States) George Kurtz	1374

GTD Pro Drivers' Championship standings
Pos.	+/–	Driver	Points
1		(Spain) Antonio García (United Kingdom) Alexander Sims	2254
2	1	(Spain) Albert Costa	2224
3	1	(Austria) Klaus Bachler (Germany) Laurin Heinrich	2157
4	1	(United Kingdom) Sebastian Priaulx (Germany) Mike Rockenfeller	2094
5	1	(United Kingdom) Dan Harper (Germany) Max Hesse	2024

GTD Drivers' Championship standings
Pos.	+/–	Driver	Points
1		(Switzerland) Philip Ellis (United States) Russell Ward	2147
2		(United Kingdom) Jack Hawksworth (Canada) Parker Thompson	2035
3		(United Kingdom) Casper Stevenson	2030
4	2	(United States) Kenton Koch	1951
5		(United States) Robby Foley (United States) Patrick Gallagher	1885

Note: Only the top five positions are included for all sets of standings.

GTP Teams' Championship standings
Pos.	+/–	Team	Points
1		(Germany) #6 Porsche Penske Motorsport	2028
2		(Germany) #7 Porsche Penske Motorsport	2016
3	1	(United States) #24 BMW M Team RLL	1766
4	1	(United States) #93 Acura Meyer Shank Racing w/ Curb-Agajanian	1753
5		(United States) #10 Cadillac Wayne Taylor Racing	1749

LMP2 Teams' Championship standings
Pos.	+/–	Team	Points
1	1	(United States) #99 AO Racing	1682
2	1	(United States) #22 United Autosports USA	1575
3		(United States) #74 Riley	1471
4		(Poland) #43 Inter Europol Competition	1436
5	1	(France) #11 TDS Racing	1409

GTD Pro Teams' Championship standings
Pos.	+/–	Team	Points
1		(United States) #3 Corvette Racing by Pratt Miller Motorsports	2254
2	1	(United States) #81 DragonSpeed	2224
3	1	(United States) #77 AO Racing	2157
4	1	(Canada) #64 Ford Multimatic Motorsports	2094
5	1	(United States) #48 Paul Miller Racing	2024

GTD Teams' Championship standings
Pos.	+/–	Team	Points
1		(United States) #57 Winward Racing	2147
2		(United States) #12 Vasser Sullivan Racing	2035
3		(United States) #27 Heart of Racing Team	2030
4	1	(United States) #96 Turner Motorsport	1885
5	1	(United States) #120 Wright Motorsports	1865

Note: Only the top five positions are included for all sets of standings.

GTP Manufacturers' Championship standings
Pos.	+/–	Manufacturer	Points
1		(Germany) Porsche	2492
2		(Japan) Acura	2447
3	1	(Germany) BMW	2344
4	1	(United States) Cadillac	2302
5		(United Kingdom) Aston Martin	1725

GTD Pro Manufacturers' Championship standings
Pos.	+/–	Manufacturer	Points
1		(United States) Chevrolet	2330
2	2	(Germany) BMW	2313
3		(Italy) Ferrari	2274
4	1	(United States) Ford	2248
5	3	(Germany) Porsche	2227

GTD Manufacturers' Championship standings
Pos.	+/–	Manufacturer	Points
1		(Germany) Mercedes-AMG	2361
2	2	(Italy) Ferrari	2207
3	1	(Japan) Lexus	2168
4	1	(United Kingdom) Aston Martin	2141
5		(Germany) Porsche	2114

Note: Only the top five positions are included for all sets of standings.

IMSA SportsCar Championship
Previous race: Chevrolet Grand Prix	2025 season	Next race: Michelin GT Challenge at VIR
