= Tobias Lütke =

German-Canadian entrepreneur and software developer

Tobias Lütke MSC
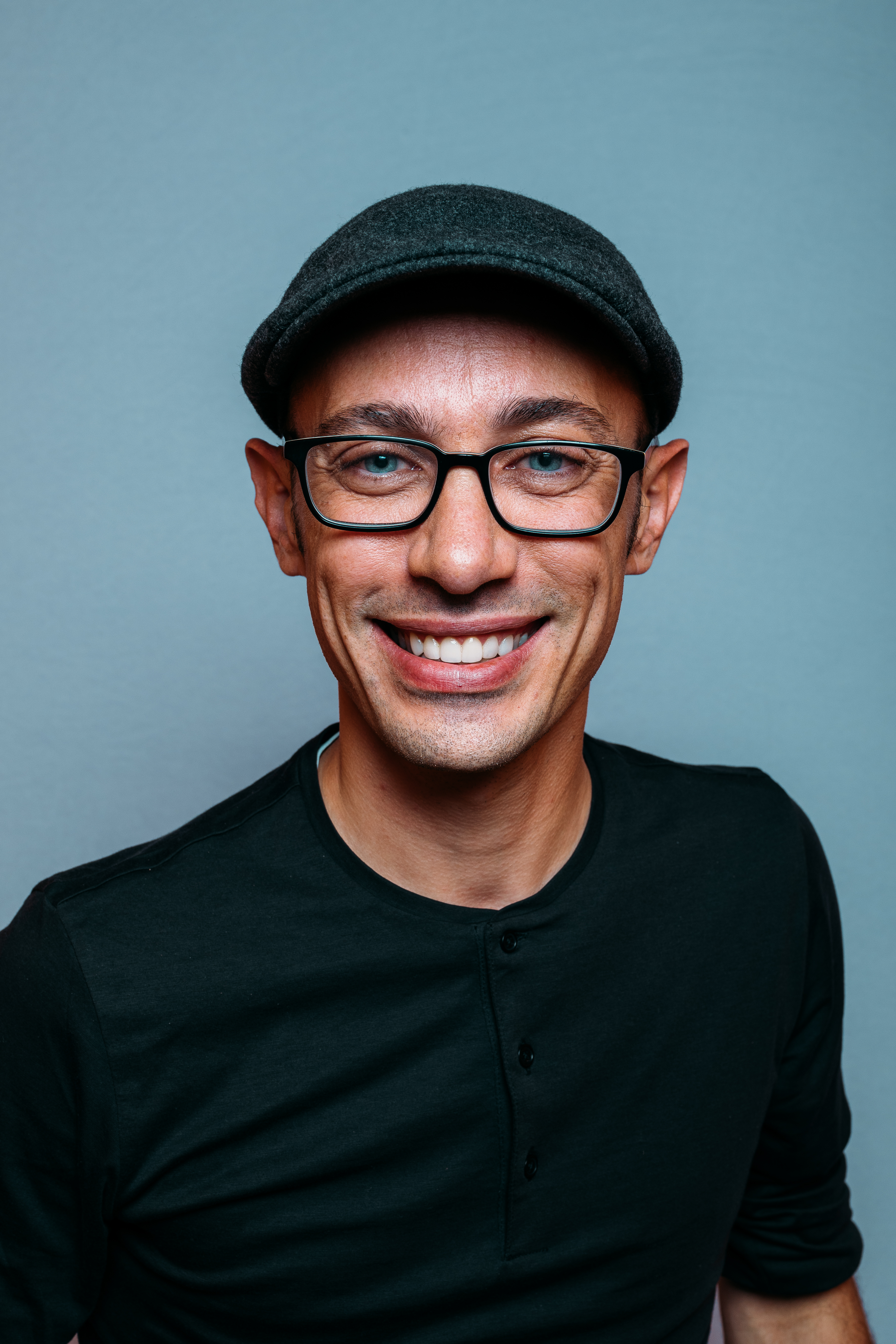
- Lütke in 2019
- Born: 1980 (age 45–46); Koblenz, West Germany
- Other name: Tobi Lütke
- Citizenship: Canadian; German
- Occupation: Businessman
- Title: CEO of Shopify
- Board member of: Coinbase
- Spouse: Fiona McKean
- Children: 3
- Awards: Meritorious Service Cross (2018)
- Categorisation: FIA Bronze
- Website: tobi.lutke.com

Tobias Lütke (born 1980) is a German Canadian entrepreneur and racing driver who is the co-founder and CEO of Shopify, an e-commerce company based in Ottawa, Ontario, Canada. He competes in the 2025 IMSA SportsCar Championship driving in LMP2 for Era Motorsport.

Lütke has been part of the core team of the Ruby on Rails framework and has created open source libraries such as Active Merchant. As of 2022, he was the 11th richest Canadian. As of August 2025, his net worth was US$12.3 billion.

== Early life ==
Lütke was born in Koblenz, Rhineland-Palatinate, Germany, in 1980. He received a Schneider CPC (German brand of the Amstrad Colour Personal Computer distributed by the Schneider Rundfunkwerke AG) from his parents at the age of six. Lütke graduated from school and entered an apprenticeship program at the Carl-Benz-School in Koblenz to become a computer programmer after the tenth grade. He moved from Germany to Canada in 2003.

During the early development of Shopify, Lütke lived in the Ottawa home of his parents-in-law, Bruce and Dale McKean, who were retired federal public servants. Bruce McKean also provided early seed capital to fund the startup.

Lütke cites John Carmack's .plan-files from the mid-1990s as "making a huge impression" on him as a teenager and calls them "a master class in systems design".

== Career ==
In 2004, Lütke, along with his partners, Daniel Weinand and Scott Lake, launched Snowdevil, an online snowboard shop. Lütke built a new e-commerce platform for the site, using Ruby on Rails. Soon after, the Snowdevil founders shifted their focus from snowboards to e-commerce and launched Shopify in 2006.

Lütke did not collect a salary from his business venture during the launch phase. He was able to do this as he lived with his girlfriend Fiona McKean in her parent's home where the couple resided at low cost for approximately a decade.

He currently owns 7% of Shopify, which went public in 2015. Despite controlling a minority of the shares outstanding, he controls a 40% voting interest in Shopify due to a two-class voting structure.

The Globe and Mail named Lütke "CEO of the Year" in November 2014. Lütke was presented with the Meritorious Service Cross on November 5, 2018, for his work in supporting the growth of the Canadian technology industry.

In October 2019, Lütke donated over 1 million dollars to Team Trees. This made him the largest donor in the project's history and marked a personal commitment to environmental protection.

On September 8, 2021, it was announced that Lütke, along with former and current Shopify top executives and Celtic House Venture Partners, invested $3 million in Creative Layer, "a global personalized print-on-demand platform for managing Shopify orders, proofs, fulfillment, and team members".

On January 31, 2022, cryptocurrency exchange Coinbase announced Lütke would join its board of directors.

== Criticism and controversies ==
=== Platform content policies ===
Lütke has faced criticism over his handling of Shopify's platform content policies and their enforcement. Lütke has historically defended free speech in commerce, including hosting controversial clients like the far-right online tabloid Breitbart in 2017 by stating if they removed a merchant, they would be enforcing a moral code and questioned what as well as who should define it.

=== Trade war between the United States and Canada ===
In 2025, Lütke criticized the Canadian federal government for its decision to impose retaliatory tariffs on the United States after President Donald Trump enacted 25% tariffs on Canadian goods. Lütke seemed afraid of escalation, stating that "hitting back will not lead to anything good. America will shrug it off", and softly described Trump's decision to put tariffs on Canada, saying, "Trump believes that Canada has not held its side of the bargain, and he set terms to prove that we still work together: get the borders under control and crack down on fentanyl dens."

=== AI-first approach ===
In April 2025, a memo from Lütke was leaked that revealed his demand that there would be no need for new hires at Shopify unless employees could justify why AI couldn't do the job. Commentators speculated that the 'leaked' memo move was more about tackling comments about Shopify's rapidly dropping share price; new hires would be difficult to justify anyway when the company was financially struggling. Over the subsequent months Shopify continued to lay off staff, as share prices continued to struggle.

=== Voting rights controversy ===
In July 2026, Lütke expressed support for setting voting rights proportional to the level of income tax paid by a citizen, with those paying no income tax being stripped of their voting rights and others gaining one additional vote for each $100,000 paid in income tax up to five votes per person. He also endorsed pensioners losing voting rights, describing them as state dependents. The remarks triggered widespread public controversy. with the Canadian Civil Liberties Association noted that this proposal would violate Section 3 of the Charter, which guarantees all adult Canadian citizens the right to vote. Media commentary and corporate governance experts highlighted that Lütke's proposals to restrict public voting rights contrasted with his own corporate voting structure at Shopify, where a 2022 "founder share" structure grants him 40% of the company's voting power despite holding only a 6% economic stake.

== Racing career ==
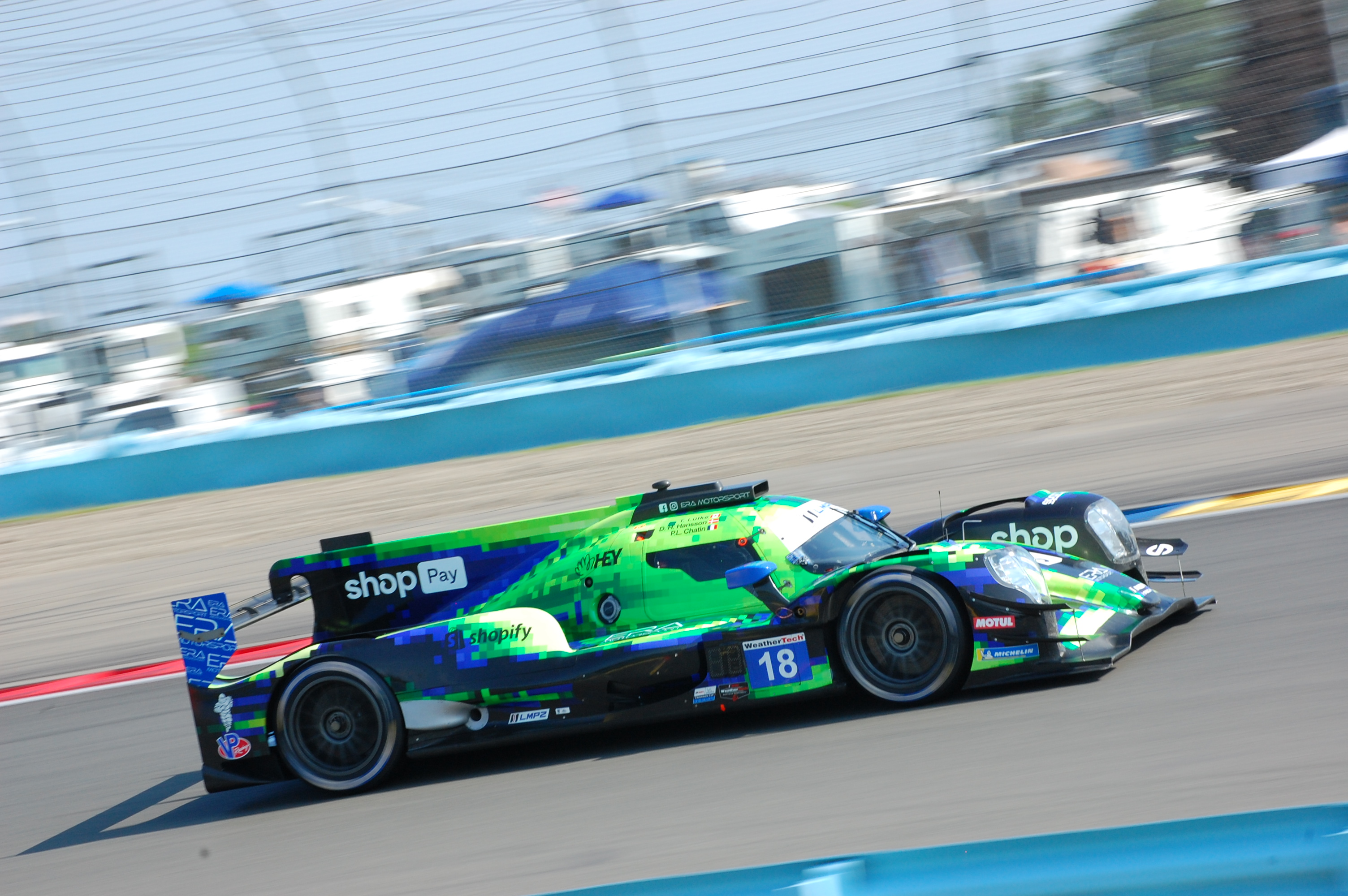
Lütke at Watkins Glen in 2025

In 2025, Lütke entered the 2025 IMSA SportsCar Championship to compete in the LMP2 class driving for Era Motorsport alongside co-drivers Paul-Loup Chatin, Ryan Dalziel, and David Heinemeier Hansson.

=== Racing career summary ===
Season	Series	Team	Races	Wins	Poles	F/Laps	Podiums	Points	Position
2024	HSR Prototype Challenge presented by IMSA - Amateur	TWOth. Autosport	6	3	N/A	N/A	5	44	**1st**
2025	IMSA SportsCar Championship - LMP2	Era Motorsport	6	0	0	0	1	1647	15th
2026	IMSA SportsCar Championship - LMP2	TDS Racing	7	0	0	0	1	1775	10th
2026	24 Hours of Le Mans - LMP2 Pro-Am	TDS Racing	1	0	0	0	0	N/A	5th

* Season still in progress.

=== Complete IMSA SportsCar Championship results ===
(key) (Races in bold indicate pole position; results in italics indicate fastest lap)

Year	Team	Class	Make	Engine	1	2	3	4	5	6	7	Rank	Points
2025	Era Motorsport	LMP2	Oreca 07	Gibson GK428 4.2 L V8	DAY; 4	SEB; 12	WGL; 4	MOS	ELK; 5	IMS; 12	ATL; 3	15th	1647
2026	TDS Racing	LMP2	Oreca 07	Gibson GK428 4.2 L V8	DAY; 12	SEB; 7	WGL; 10	MOS; 9	ELK; 3	IMS; 7	PET; 11	10th	1775

* Season still in progress.

==== 24 Hours of Daytona results ====
Year	Class	No	Team	Car	Co-drivers	Laps	Position	Class Pos.
2025	LMP2	18	(United States) Era Motorsport	Oreca 07	(France) Paul-Loup Chatin (United Kingdom) Ryan Dalziel (Denmark) David Heinemeier Hansson	764	12th	4nd

=== Complete 24 Hours of Le Mans results ===
Year	Team	Co-Drivers	Car	Class	Laps	Pos.	Class Pos.
2026	(France) TDS Racing	(Switzerland) Mathias Beche (France) Kévin Estre	Oreca 07-Gibson	LMP2	355	27th	13th
2026	(France) TDS Racing	(Switzerland) Mathias Beche (France) Kévin Estre	Oreca 07-Gibson	LMP2 Pro-Am	355	27th	5th

== Personal life ==
Lütke has three children with his wife Fiona McKean, a former Canadian diplomat.

In 2015, Lütke and McKean purchased and relaunched a classic Ontario summer resort lodge named Opinicon near Chaffey's Locks on the Rideau River.
