= 2021 Grand Prix of Long Beach =

Tenth round of the 2021 IMSA SportsCar Championship Season

The layout of the Long Beach Street Circuit

The 2021 Grand Prix of Long Beach (formally known as the Acura Grand Prix of Long Beach) was a sports car race sanctioned by the International Motor Sports Association (IMSA). The race was held at Long Beach Street Circuit in Long Beach, California on September 25, 2021. It was the tenth round of the 2021 IMSA SportsCar Championship, and seventh the round of 2021 WeatherTech Sprint Cup.

== Background ==
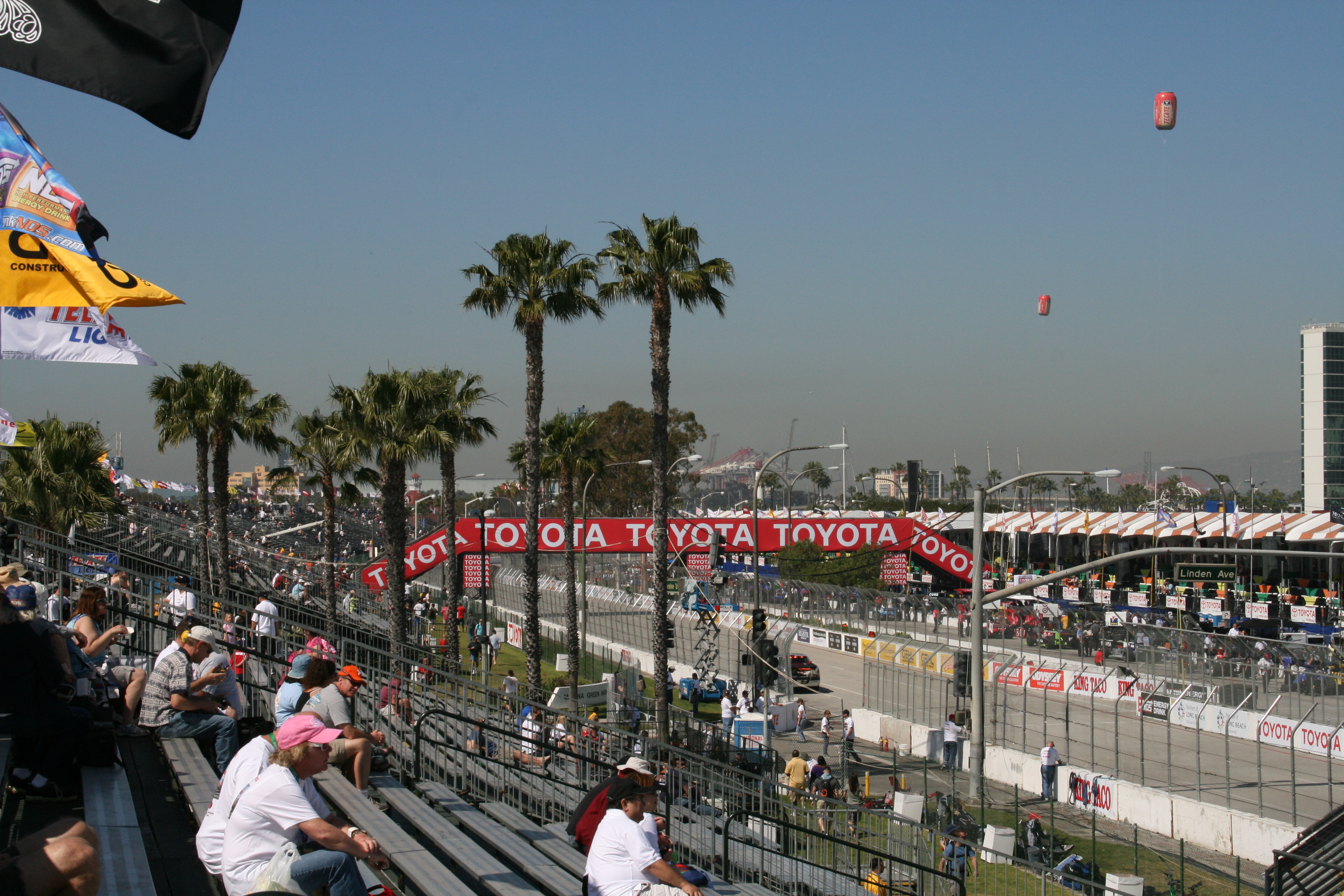
The Long Beach Street Circuit (pictured in 2009), where the race was held

The race marked IMSA's return to Long Beach after the previous year's edition was cancelled as a result of the COVID-19 pandemic. Originally scheduled to be run on April 17, 2021, the race was to kick off the two "West Coast Swing" rounds also consisting of WeatherTech Raceway Laguna Seca, however, the event postponed to September 25, 2021, due to the ongoing COVID-19 Pandemic in California. As a result of getting postponed, the race was set to clash with the 6 Hours of Fuji WEC race at Fuji, however the WEC event would get cancelled. The race marked the first time since the 2021 Sports Car Challenge at Mid-Ohio where spectators and fans were mandated to wear masks. GTD Would be returning to Long Beach for the first time since 2017.

On September 17, 2021, IMSA released the latest technical bulletin outlining Balance of Performance for the event. In GTD, the Ferrari 488 GT3 Evo 2020 received a 10 kilogram weight increase while the Lamborghini Huracán GT3 Evo got a fuel capacity reduction of 2 liters. No changes were made in DPi and GTLM.

Before the race, Filipe Albuquerque and Ricky Taylor led the DPi Drivers' Championship with 2765 points, ahead of Pipo Derani and Felipe Nasr in second with 2667 points, and Oliver Jarvis and Harry Tincknell with 2597 points. Antonio García and Jordan Taylor led the GTLM Drivers' Championship with 2562 points, 187 points ahead of Tommy Milner and Nick Tandy followed by Cooper MacNeil in third. With 2242 points, the GTD Drivers' Championship was led by Bill Auberlen and Robby Foley, ahead of Zacharie Robichon and Laurens Vanthoor. Cadillac, Chevrolet, and Porsche were leading their respective Manufacturers' Championships, while WTR-Konica Minolta Acura, Corvette Racing, Turner Motorsport and each led their own Teams' Championships.

=== Entries ===
A total of 26 cars took part in the event, split across three classes. 6 cars were entered in DPi, 3 in GTLM, 17 and in GTD. In GTLM, Cooper MacNeil would be joined by Mathieu Jaminet in the #79 WeatherTech Racing entry. GTD saw Scuderia Corsa return for the first time since Daytona. GMG Racing would be competing in the series for the first time since 2014 featuring drivers Kyle Washington and James Sofronas. US RaceTronics also made their IMSA SportsCar Championship debut at this event.

== Practice ==
There were two practice sessions preceding the start of the race on Saturday, one on Friday morning and one on Friday afternoon. The first session lasted one hour on Friday morning while the second session on Friday afternoon lasted 75 minutes.

=== Practice 1 ===
The first practice session took place at 9:00 AM PT on Friday and ended with Felipe Nasr topping the charts for Whelen Engineering Racing, with a lap time of 1:13.498, ahead of Renger van der Zande in the No. 01 Cadillac. The GTLM class was topped by the No. 4 Corvette Racing Chevrolet Corvette C8.R of Nick Tandy with a time of 1:19.734, ahead of Antonio García in the No. 3 Corvette. Patrick Long set the fastest time in GTD with a time of 1:20.544, ahead of Bryan Sellers in the Paul Miller Racing entry. The session was red flagged three times. The No. 55 Mazda of Oliver Jarvis stopped at turn ten due to a mechanical problem in the opening minutes of the session. Alex Riberas spun at turn 9 resulting in the second red flag of the session. The final stoppage came when Oliver Pla crashed the No. 60 Acura with 14 minutes remaining in the session resulting in the session ending early.

Pos.	Class	No.	Team	Driver	Time	Gap
1	DPi	31	Whelen Engineering Racing	Felipe Nasr	1:13.498	_
2	DPi	01	Cadillac Chip Ganassi Racing	Renger van der Zande	1:14.333	+0.835
3	DPi	60	Meyer Shank Racing with Curb-Agajanian	Oliver Pla	1:14.393	+0.895

=== Practice 2 ===
The second and final practice session took place at 12:45 PM PT on Friday and ended with Felipe Nasr topping the charts for Whelen Engineering Racing, with a lap time of 1:11.983. Loïc Duval's No. 5 Cadillac was second fastest followed by Kevin Magnussen in the No. 01 Cadillac. The GTLM class was topped by the No. 3 Corvette Racing Chevrolet Corvette C8.R of Antonio García with a time of 1:17.516, ahead of Tommy Milner in the No. 4 Corvette. Patrick Long set the fastest time in GTD with a time of 1:20.089. Zacharie Robichon in the No. 9 Porsche was second fastest followed by the No. 1 Paul Miller Racing Lamborghini Huracán GT3 Evo of Bryan Sellers. The session was stopped with less than two minutes remaining when Dane Cameron spun the No. 60 Acura at turn eight and stalled resulting in the session ending early.

Pos.	Class	No.	Team	Driver	Time	Gap
1	DPi	31	Whelen Engineering Racing	Felipe Nasr	1:11.983	_
2	DPi	5	JDC-Mustang Sampling Racing	Loïc Duval	1:12.145	+0.162
3	DPi	01	Cadillac Chip Ganassi Racing	Kevin Magnussen	1:12.290	+0.307

== Qualifying ==
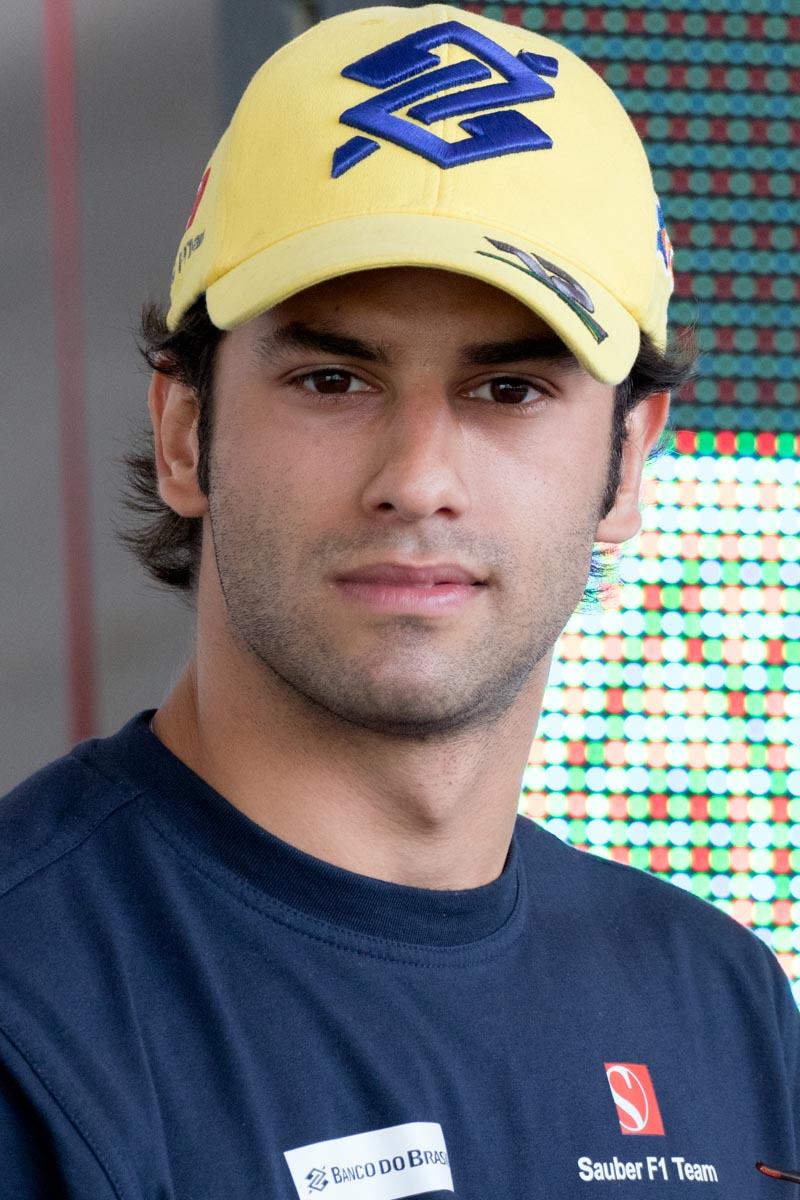
Felipe Nasr (pictured in 2015) helped take the No. 31 Cadillac's fourth pole position of 2021.

Qualifying was broken into three sessions. The first was for cars in the GTD class. Madison Snow qualified on pole for the class driving the No. 1 car for Paul Miller Racing, beating Robby Foley in the No. 96 Turner Motorsport BMW by more than one-tenth of a second. Richard Heistand was third in the No. 39 CarBahn Motorsports with Peregrine Racing Audi followed by Zacharie Robichon in the No. 9 Pfaff Motorsports Porsche.

The second session was for cars in the GTLM and GTD classes. Jordan Taylor qualified on pole in GTLM driving the No. 3 car for Corvette Racing, besting teammate Tommy Milner in the sister No. 4 Corvette Racing entry. Laurens Vanthoor set the fastest time in the GTD points paying session driving the No. 9 car for Pfaff Motorsports and earned 35 championship points. Vanthoor was 0.148 seconds clear of Bryan Sellers in the No. 1 Paul Miller Racing Lamborghini. Jack Hawksworth was third in the No. 14 Lexus followed by Bill Auberlen in the No. 96 BMW. The session was shortened after Alex Riberas, driving the No. 27 Heart of Racing Team Aston Martin, spun at turn eight and attempted to rejoin the track. Riberas blocked the track and squeezed Patrick Long's No. 16 Porsche to the barrier. For causing a red flag, Riberas had his best two laps from the session deleted.

The final session of qualifying was for cars in the DPi class. Felipe Nasr qualified on pole driving the No. 31 car for Whelen Engineering Racing, beating Kevin Magnussen in the No. 01 Cadillac Chip Ganassi Racing entry by 0.104 seconds. Loïc Duval was third in the No. 5 JDC-Mustang Sampling Racing Cadillac followed by Dane Cameron's No. 60 Meyer Shank Racing Acura in fourth. The session was shortened after Oliver Jarvis, driving the No. 55 Mazda Motorsports Mazda RT24-P, crashed at turn nine. For causing a red flag, Jarvis had his best two laps from the session deleted.

=== Qualifying results ===
Pole positions in each class are indicated in bold and by ‡.

Pos.	Class	No.	Team	Driver	Time	Gap	Grid
1	**DPi**	**31**	**(United States) Whelen Engineering Racing**	**(Brazil) Felipe Nasr**	**1:11.620**	**_**	1‡
2	DPi	01	(United States) Cadillac Chip Ganassi Racing	(Denmark) Kevin Magnussen	1:11.724	+0.104	2
3	DPi	5	(United States) JDC-Mustang Sampling Racing	(France) Loïc Duval	1:11.827	+0.207	3
4	DPi	60	(United States) Meyer Shank Racing with Curb-Agajanian	(United States) Dane Cameron	1:12.440	+0.820	4
5	DPi	10	(United States) WTR-Konica Minolta Acura	(Portugal) Filipe Albuquerque	1:12.461	+0.841	5
6	DPi	55	(Japan) Mazda Motorsports	(United Kingdom) Oliver Jarvis	1:13.179^{1}	+1.559	6
7	**GTLM**	**3**	**(United States) Corvette Racing**	**(United States) Jordan Taylor**	**1:16.801**	**+5.181**	7‡
8	GTLM	4	(United States) Corvette Racing	(United States) Tommy Milner	1:17.098	+5.478	8
9	**GTD**	**1**	**(United States) Paul Miller Racing**	**(United States) Madison Snow**	**1:19.475**	**+7.855**	10‡
10	GTD	96	(United States) Turner Motorsport	(United States) Robby Foley	1:19.609	+7.989	11
11	GTLM	79	(United States) WeatherTech Racing	(United States) Cooper MacNeil	1:19.686	+8.066	9
12	GTD	39	(United States) CarBahn Motorsports with Peregrine Racing	(United States) Richard Heistand	1:19.707	+8.087	12
13	GTD	9	(Canada) Pfaff Motorsports	(Canada) Zacharie Robichon	1:19.772	+8.152	16
14	GTD	63	(United States) Scuderia Corsa	(Italy) Daniel Mancinelli	1:19.849	+8.229	17
15	GTD	16	(United States) Wright Motorsports	(United States) Trent Hindman	1:20.018	+8.398	13
16	GTD	14	(United States) Vasser Sullivan Racing	(United States) Aaron Telitz	1:20.083	+8.463	14
17	GTD	23	(United States) Heart Of Racing Team	(Canada) Roman De Angelis	1:20.196	+8.576	15
18	GTD	12	(United States) Vasser Sullivan Racing	(United States) Frankie Montecalvo	1:20.221	+8.601	18
19	GTD	66	(United States) Gradient Racing	(United Kingdom) Till Bechtolsheimer	1:20.272	+8.652	19
20	GTD	26	(United States) O'Gara Motorsport - USRT	(United States) Steven Aghakhani	1:20.283	+8.663	20
21	GTD	19	(Austria) GRT Grasser Racing Team	(Canada) Misha Goikhberg	1:20.498	+8.878	21
22	GTD	76	(United States) Compass Racing	(United States) Matt McMurry	1:20.635	+9.015	22
23	GTD	27	(United States) Heart Of Racing Team	(United Kingdom) Ian James	1:21.133	+9.513	23
24	GTD	88	(United States) Team Hardpoint	(United States) Rob Ferriol	1:21.167	+9.547	24
25	GTD	44	(United States) Magnus Racing with Archangel Motorsports	(United States) John Potter	1:21.697	+10.077	25
26	GTD	34	(United States) GMG Racing	(United States) Kyle Washington	1:22.435	+10.815	26
Sources:

- ^{1} The No. 55 Mazda Motorsports entry had its two fastest laps deleted as penalty for causing a red flag during its qualifying session.

== Race ==
=== Post-Race ===
The result of the race meant Filipe Albuquerque and Ricky Taylor were still in the lead of the DPi Drivers' Championship with 3071 points, but their advantage had been reduced by 79 points as the victory of Derani and Nasr meant the two drivers were nineteen points behind. The result kept Antonio García and Jordan Taylor atop the GTLM Drivers' Championship. Jaminet advanced from sixth to fifth. As a result of winning the race, Sellers and Snow advanced from fourth to second in the GTD Drivers' Championship. Robichon and Vanthoor jumped from second to first while Auberlen and Foley dropped from first to fourth. Cadillac, Chevrolet, and Porsche continued to top their respective Manufacturers' Championships while WTR-Konica Minolta Acura and Corvette Racing kept their respective advantages in their respective Teams' Championships. Pfaff Motorsports took the lead of the GTD Teams' Championship with two rounds remaining in the season.

=== Race results ===
Class winners are denoted in bold and ‡.

Pos	Class	No.	Team	Drivers	Chassis	Laps	Time/Retired
Pos	Class	No.	Team	Drivers	Engine	Laps	Time/Retired
1	**DPi**	**31**	**(United States) Whelen Engineering Racing**	**(Brazil) Felipe Nasr (Brazil) Pipo Derani**	**Cadillac DPi-V.R**	**78**	**1:40:46.781‡**
1	**DPi**	**31**	**(United States) Whelen Engineering Racing**	**(Brazil) Felipe Nasr (Brazil) Pipo Derani**	**Cadillac 5.5L V8**	**78**	**1:40:46.781‡**
2	DPi	01	(United States) Cadillac Chip Ganassi Racing	(Netherlands) Renger van der Zande (Denmark) Kevin Magnussen	Cadillac DPi-V.R	78	+10.952
2	DPi	01	(United States) Cadillac Chip Ganassi Racing	(Netherlands) Renger van der Zande (Denmark) Kevin Magnussen	Cadillac 5.5L V8	78	+10.952
3	DPi	5	(United States) JDC-Mustang Sampling Racing	(France) Tristan Vautier (France) Loïc Duval	Cadillac DPi-V.R	78	+15.869
3	DPi	5	(United States) JDC-Mustang Sampling Racing	(France) Tristan Vautier (France) Loïc Duval	Cadillac 5.5L V8	78	+15.869
4	DPi	10	(United States) Konica Minolta Acura	(United States) Ricky Taylor (Portugal) Filipe Albuquerque	Acura ARX-05	78	+50.566
4	DPi	10	(United States) Konica Minolta Acura	(United States) Ricky Taylor (Portugal) Filipe Albuquerque	Acura AR35TT 3.5L Turbo V6	78	+50.566
5	DPi	55	(Canada) Mazda Motorsports	(United Kingdom) Oliver Jarvis (United Kingdom) Harry Tincknell	Mazda RT24-P	78	+1:13.185
5	DPi	55	(Canada) Mazda Motorsports	(United Kingdom) Oliver Jarvis (United Kingdom) Harry Tincknell	Mazda MZ-2.0T 2.0L Turbo I4	78	+1:13.185
6	**GTLM**	**4**	**(United States) Corvette Racing**	**(United States) Tommy Milner (United Kingdom) Nick Tandy**	**Chevrolet Corvette C8.R**	**75**	**+15.107‡**
6	**GTLM**	**4**	**(United States) Corvette Racing**	**(United States) Tommy Milner (United Kingdom) Nick Tandy**	**Chevrolet 5.5L V8**	**75**	**+15.107‡**
7	GTLM	3	(United States) Corvette Racing	(Spain) Antonio García (United States) Jordan Taylor	Chevrolet Corvette C8.R	75	+3 Laps
7	GTLM	3	(United States) Corvette Racing	(Spain) Antonio García (United States) Jordan Taylor	Chevrolet 5.5L V8	75	+3 Laps
8	GTLM	79	(United States) WeatherTech Racing	(United States) Cooper MacNeil (France) Mathieu Jaminet	Porsche 911 RSR-19	74	+4 Laps
8	GTLM	79	(United States) WeatherTech Racing	(United States) Cooper MacNeil (France) Mathieu Jaminet	Porsche 4.2L Flat-6	74	+4 Laps
9	**GTD**	**1**	**(United States) Paul Miller Racing**	**(United States) Bryan Sellers (United States) Madison Snow**	**Lamborghini Huracán GT3 Evo**	**73**	**+5 Laps‡**
9	**GTD**	**1**	**(United States) Paul Miller Racing**	**(United States) Bryan Sellers (United States) Madison Snow**	**Lamborghini 5.2L V10**	**73**	**+5 Laps‡**
10	GTD	9	(Canada) Pfaff Motorsports	(Canada) Zacharie Robichon (Belgium) Laurens Vanthoor	Porsche 911 GT3 R	73	+5 Laps
10	GTD	9	(Canada) Pfaff Motorsports	(Canada) Zacharie Robichon (Belgium) Laurens Vanthoor	Porsche 4.0L Flat-6	73	+5 Laps
11	GTD	16	(United States) Wright Motorsports	(United States) Trent Hindman (United States) Patrick Long	Porsche 911 GT3 R	73	+5 Laps
11	GTD	16	(United States) Wright Motorsports	(United States) Trent Hindman (United States) Patrick Long	Porsche 4.0L Flat-6	73	+5 Laps
12	GTD	14	(United States) Vasser Sullivan Racing	(United States) Aaron Telitz (United Kingdom) Jack Hawksworth	Lexus RC F GT3	73	+5 Laps
12	GTD	14	(United States) Vasser Sullivan Racing	(United States) Aaron Telitz (United Kingdom) Jack Hawksworth	Lexus 5.0L V8	73	+5 Laps
13	GTD	39	(United States) CarBahn Motorsports with Peregrine Racing	(United States) Richard Heistand (United States) Jeff Westphal	Audi R8 LMS Evo	73	+5 Laps
13	GTD	39	(United States) CarBahn Motorsports with Peregrine Racing	(United States) Richard Heistand (United States) Jeff Westphal	Audi 5.2L V10	73	+5 Laps
14	GTD	23	(United States) Heart of Racing Team	(Canada) Roman De Angelis (United Kingdom) Ross Gunn	Aston Martin Vantage GT3	73	+5 Laps
14	GTD	23	(United States) Heart of Racing Team	(Canada) Roman De Angelis (United Kingdom) Ross Gunn	Mercedes-Benz M177 4.0 L Turbo V8	73	+5 Laps
15	GTD	26	(United States) O'Gara Motorsport - USRT	(United States) Steven Aghakhani (Australia) Jake Eidson	Mercedes-AMG GT3 Evo	73	+5 Laps
15	GTD	26	(United States) O'Gara Motorsport - USRT	(United States) Steven Aghakhani (Australia) Jake Eidson	Mercedes-AMG M159 6.2L V8	73	+5 Laps
16	GTD	66	(United States) Gradient Racing	(United Kingdom) Till Bechtolsheimer (United States) Marc Miller	Acura NSX GT3 Evo	73	+5 Laps
16	GTD	66	(United States) Gradient Racing	(United Kingdom) Till Bechtolsheimer (United States) Marc Miller	Acura 3.5L Turbo V6	73	+5 Laps
17	GTD	88	(United States) Team Hardpoint	(United States) Rob Ferriol (United Kingdom) Katherine Legge	Porsche 911 GT3 R	72	+6 Laps
17	GTD	88	(United States) Team Hardpoint	(United States) Rob Ferriol (United Kingdom) Katherine Legge	Porsche 4.0L Flat-6	72	+6 Laps
18	GTD	63	(United States) Scuderia Corsa	(United States) Colin Braun (Italy) Daniel Mancinelli	Ferrari 488 GT3 Evo 2020	72	+6 Laps
18	GTD	63	(United States) Scuderia Corsa	(United States) Colin Braun (Italy) Daniel Mancinelli	Ferrari F154CB 3.9 L Turbo V8	72	+6 Laps
19	GTD	76	(United States) Compass Racing	(United States) Matt McMurry (Germany) Mario Farnbacher	Acura NSX GT3 Evo	72	+6 Laps
19	GTD	76	(United States) Compass Racing	(United States) Matt McMurry (Germany) Mario Farnbacher	Acura 3.5L Turbo V6	72	+6 Laps
20	GTD	27	(United States) Heart of Racing Team	(United Kingdom) Ian James (Spain) Alex Riberas	Aston Martin Vantage GT3	72	+6 Laps
20	GTD	27	(United States) Heart of Racing Team	(United Kingdom) Ian James (Spain) Alex Riberas	Mercedes-Benz M177 4.0 L Turbo V8	72	+6 Laps
21	GTD	12	(United States) Vasser Sullivan Racing	(United States) Frankie Montecalvo (United States) Zach Veach	Lexus RC F GT3	72	+6 Laps
21	GTD	12	(United States) Vasser Sullivan Racing	(United States) Frankie Montecalvo (United States) Zach Veach	Lexus 5.0L V8	72	+6 Laps
22	GTD	44	(United States) Magnus Racing with Archangel Motorsports	(United States) John Potter (United States) Andy Lally	Acura NSX GT3 Evo	71	+7 Laps
22	GTD	44	(United States) Magnus Racing with Archangel Motorsports	(United States) John Potter (United States) Andy Lally	Acura 3.5L Turbo V6	71	+7 Laps
23	GTD	34	(United States) GMG Racing	(United States) James Sofronas (United States) Kyle Washington	Porsche 911 GT3 R	70	+8 Laps
23	GTD	34	(United States) GMG Racing	(United States) James Sofronas (United States) Kyle Washington	Porsche 4.0L Flat-6	70	+8 Laps
24	GTD	96	(United States) Turner Motorsport	(United States) Bill Auberlen (United States) Robby Foley	BMW M6 GT3	69	+9 Laps
24	GTD	96	(United States) Turner Motorsport	(United States) Bill Auberlen (United States) Robby Foley	BMW 4.4L Turbo V8	69	+9 Laps
25 DNF	DPi	60	(United States) Meyer Shank Racing with Curb-Agajanian	(United States) Dane Cameron (France) Olivier Pla	Acura ARX-05	68	Accident
25 DNF	DPi	60	(United States) Meyer Shank Racing with Curb-Agajanian	(United States) Dane Cameron (France) Olivier Pla	Acura AR35TT 3.5L Turbo V6	68	Accident
26 DNF	GTD	19	(Austria) GRT Grasser Racing Team	(Canada) Misha Goikhberg (France) Franck Perera	Lamborghini Huracán GT3 Evo	25	Accident
26 DNF	GTD	19	(Austria) GRT Grasser Racing Team	(Canada) Misha Goikhberg (France) Franck Perera	Lamborghini 5.2L V10	25	Accident

== Standings after the race ==
DPi Drivers' Championship standings
Pos.	+/–	Driver	Points
1		(Portugal) Filipe Albuquerque (United States) Ricky Taylor	3071
2		(Brazil) Pipo Derani (Brazil) Felipe Nasr	3052
3		(United Kingdom) Oliver Jarvis (United Kingdom) Harry Tincknell	2882
4		(Denmark) Kevin Magnussen (Netherlands) Renger van der Zande	2879
5		(United States) Dane Cameron (France) Olivier Pla	2668

LMP2 Drivers' Championship standings
Pos.	+/–	Driver	Points
1		(Denmark) Mikkel Jensen (United States) Ben Keating	1807
2		(United States) Tristan Nunez (United States) Steven Thomas	1694
3		(France) Gabriel Aubry (Canada) John Farano	1634
4		(United Kingdom) Ryan Dalziel (United States) Dwight Merriman	1330
5		(United States) Scott Huffaker	702

LMP3 Drivers' Championship standings
Pos.	+/–	Driver	Points
1		(United States) Gar Robinson	1800
2		(United States) Jon Bennett (United States) Colin Braun	1750
3		(United States) Jim Cox (United States) Dylan Murry	1594
4		(Sweden) Rasmus Lindh	1538
5		(United States) Oliver Askew	1504

GTLM Drivers' Championship standings
Pos.	+/–	Driver	Points
1		(Spain) Antonio García (United States) Jordan Taylor	2917
2		(United States) Tommy Milner (United Kingdom) Nick Tandy	2757
3		(United States) Cooper MacNeil	2644
4		(Australia) Matt Campbell	1702
5	1	(France) Mathieu Jaminet	1324

GTD Drivers' Championship standings
Pos.	+/–	Driver	Points
1	1	(Canada) Zacharie Robichon (Belgium) Laurens Vanthoor	2570
2	2	(United States) Madison Snow (United States) Bryan Sellers	2538
3		(Canada) Roman De Angelis (United Kingdom) Ross Gunn	2466
4	3	(United States) Bill Auberlen (United States) Robby Foley	2420
5		(United States) Patrick Long	2363

- Note: Only the top five positions are included for all sets of standings.

DPi Teams' Championship standings
Pos.	+/–	Team	Points
1		(United States) #10 WTR-Konica Minolta Acura	3071
2		(United States) #31 Whelen Engineering Racing	3052
3		(Canada) #55 Mazda Motorsports	2882
4		(United States) #01 Cadillac Chip Ganassi Racing	2879
5		(United States) #60 Meyer Shank Racing w/ Curb-Agajanian	2668

LMP2 Teams' Championship standings
Pos.	+/–	Team	Points
1		(United States) #52 PR1 Mathiasen Motorsports	1807
2		(United States) #11 WIN Autosport	1694
3		(United States) #8 Tower Motorsport	1634
4		(United States) #18 Era Motorsport	1330
5		(United States) #22 United Autosports	614

LMP3 Teams' Championship standings
Pos.	+/–	Team	Points
1		(United States) #74 Riley Motorsports	1800
2		(United States) #54 CORE Autosport	1750
3		(United States) #91 Riley Motorsports	1594
4		(United States) #38 Performance Tech Motorsports	1538
5		(United States) #36 Andretti Autosport	1192

GTLM Teams' Championship standings
Pos.	+/–	Team	Points
1		(United States) #3 Corvette Racing	2917
2		(United States) #4 Corvette Racing	2757
3		(United States) #79 WeatherTech Racing	2644
4		(United States) #24 BMW Team RLL	1001
5		(United States) #25 BMW Team RLL	966

GTD Teams' Championship standings
Pos.	+/–	Team	Points
1	1	(Canada) #9 Pfaff Motorsports	2570
2	2	(United States) #1 Paul Miller Racing	2538
3		(United States) #23 Heart of Racing Team	2466
4	3	(United States) #96 Turner Motorsport	2420
5		(United States) #16 Wright Motorsports	2363

- Note: Only the top five positions are included for all sets of standings.

DPi Manufacturers' Championship standings
Pos.	+/–	Manufacturer	Points
1		(United States) Cadillac	3311
2		(Japan) Acura	3223
3		(Japan) Mazda	3039

GTLM Manufacturers' Championship standings
Pos.	+/–	Manufacturer	Points
1		(United States) Chevrolet	3000
2		(Germany) Porsche	2812
3		(Germany) BMW	1052
4		(Italy) Ferrari	330

GTD Manufacturers' Championship standings
Pos.	+/–	Manufacturer	Points
1		(Germany) Porsche	2704
2	2	(Italy) Lamborghini	2655
3		(United Kingdom) Aston Martin	2574
4	2	(Germany) BMW	2529
5		(Japan) Lexus	2467

- Note: Only the top five positions are included for all sets of standings.

IMSA SportsCar Championship
Previous race: 2021 IMSA Monterey Grand Prix	2021 season	Next race: 2021 GT Challenge at VIR
