= Roman De Angelis =

Canadian racing driver (born 2001)

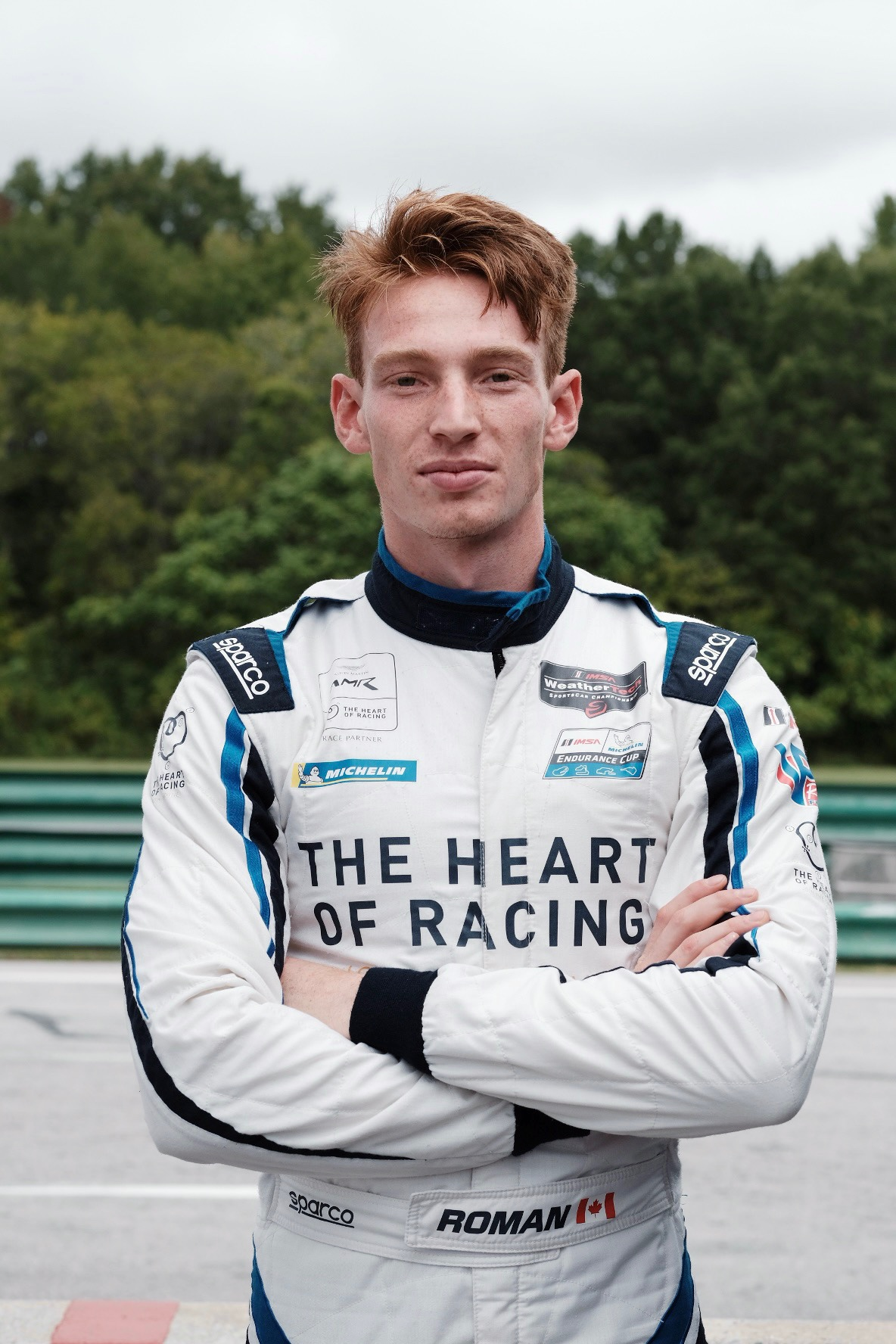
- De Angelis in 2021
- Nationality: (Canada) Canadian
- Born: Roman Senna De Angelis; 15 February 2001 (age 25) Windsor, Ontario, Canada

IMSA SportsCar Championship career
- Debut season: 2020
- Current team: The Heart of Racing
- Categorisation: FIA Silver (until 2023); FIA Gold (2024–)
- Car number: 27
- Former teams: Mark Motors Racing, Kelly Moss Racing
- Starts: 72
- Wins: 8
- Podiums: 19
- Poles: 4

Previous series
- 2016 2017–19 2018–19: Formula Ford 1600; IMSA GT3 Cup Challenge Canada; IMSA GT3 Cup Challenge USA

Championship titles
- 2017, 2019 2019 2021: IMSA GT3 Cup Challenge Canada; IMSA GT3 Cup Challenge USA; IMSA WeatherTech Sprint Cup - GTD

Roman Senna De Angelis (born 15 February 2001) is a Canadian racing driver, who currently competes in the IMSA SportsCar Championship for the Heart of Racing Team.

== Career ==
De Angelis began his racing career in karting at the age of nine and at the age 13 won his first title, the 2014 Canadian National Karting Championship. In 2016, De Angelis moved up from karting to Toyo Tires F1600 Championship Series where he won Rookie of Year honors for his second-place finish in the 18-race season.

De Angelis then moved on to race Porsche 911 GT3s competing in the IMSA GT3 Cup Challenge Canada with Mark Motors Racing beginning in 2017. In his first season he won the GT3 Cup Gold Class Canadian Championship, becoming the youngest driver to win the championship in GT3 Cup history at 16 years of age.

In 2018, De Angelis continued racing for Mark Motors Racing moving up to the GT3 Platinum Class and partnered with Kelly Moss and Racing for Children to compete in the IMSA Porsche GT3 Cup Challenge USA by Yokohama. De Angelis finished the year as runner up in both series. 2018 also saw De Angelis win his first endurance race of his career at the inaugural IMSA Prototype Challenge Roar Before the Rolex 24 driving the No. 4 Ligier JS P3 for ANSA Motorsports.

In 2019, racing with the same teams, De Angelis had the most successful season of his career winning both the GT3 Cup Platinum Class Canadian & GT3 Cup Platinum Class USA Championships, De Angelis was the first driver to accomplish this feat. De Angelis finished the 2019 season with 18 victories, 14 pole positions and 22 podiums in 24 race starts.

For the 2020 season, De Angelis joined the IMSA Weathertech Series in the GT Daytona Class competing for the Heart of Racing Team in the No. 23 Aston Martin GT Vantage car. The team got their first podium of the year at Charlotte Motor Speedway with a third-place finish and a season best second place finish at the Mobil 1 Twelve Hours of Sebring. De Angelis also raced in the Bathurst 12 Hour at Mount Panorama Motor Racing Circuit in New South Wales, Australia for the Garage 59 Team in an Aston Martin GT3 with co-driver Andrew Watson. The pair finished the race thirteenth overall and second in their GT3 Silver class. De Angelis also partnered with Panoz Racing to compete in four races of the GT4 America Series season. De Angelis and teammate Parker Chase claimed victories at Circuit of The Americas and Indianapolis.

2021 saw De Angelis remain with Heart of Racing, being joined by Ross Gunn who replaced team boss Ian James as his principal partner. The team got their first podium finish at the Mobil 1 Twelve Hours of Sebring and their first victory in Detroit at the Detroit Grand Prix at the Raceway at Belle Isle Park. De Angelis and Gunn claimed the WeatherTech Sprint Cup title as the highest scoring team in the sprint events through the season.

De Angelis was also a part of the Aston Martin Racing Driver Academy for the 2020 and 2021 seasons, as the only Canadian, in the 15-driver competition to find the next generation of GT endurance stars.

== Racing record ==
=== Career summary ===
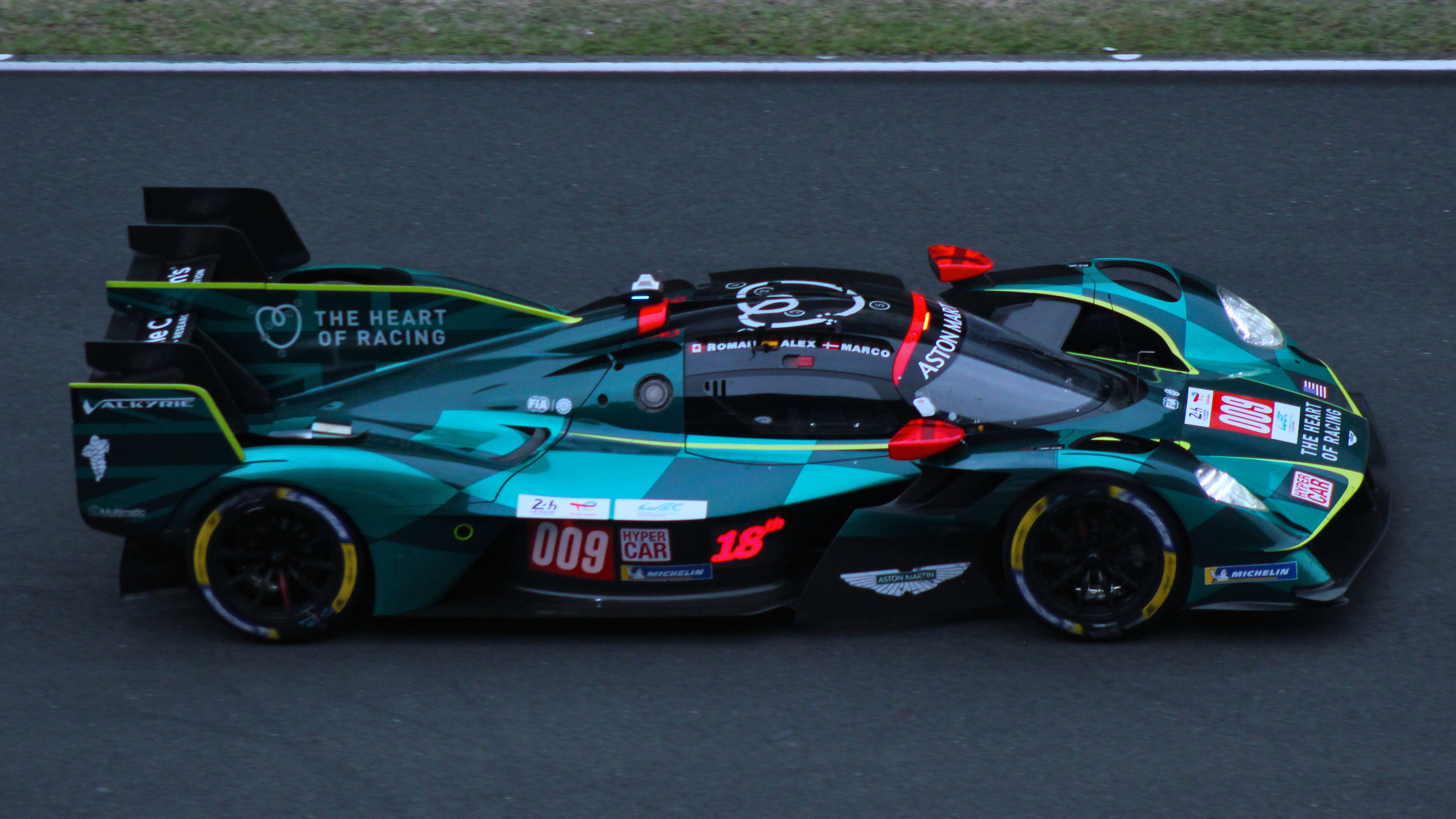
De Angelis' No. 009 car at the 2025 24 Hours of Le Mans

Season	Series	Team	Races	Wins	Poles	F/Laps	Podiums	Points	Position
2016	Toyo Tires F1600 Championship Series	Brian Graham Racing	18	4	0	0	15	374	**2nd**
2017	IMSA GT3 Cup Challenge Canada - Gold	Mark Motors Racing	11	10	9	11	11	249	**1st**
2017	IMSA GT3 Cup Challenge USA - Gold	Mark Motors Racing	13	8	12	12	9	219	**3rd**
2017	Pirelli World Challenge - GTS	ANSA Motorsports	1	0	0	0	0	5	40th
2018	IMSA GT3 Cup Challenge Canada - Platinum	Mark Motors Racing	12	1	3	1	10	373	**2nd**
2018	IMSA GT3 Cup Challenge USA - Platinum	Kelly Moss Racing	16	2	5	1	10	474	**2nd**
2018	IMSA Prototype Challenge - LMP3	ANSA Motorsports	1	1	1	0	1	50	24th
2018	IMSA Prototype Challenge - LMP3	Charles Wicht Racing	1	0	0	0	0	50	24th
2018	Porsche Supercup	Fach Auto Tech	2	0	0	0	0	0	NC†
2019	IMSA GT3 Cup Challenge Canada - Platinum	Mark Motors Racing	12	11	4	8	11	413	**1st**
2019	IMSA GT3 Cup Challenge USA - Platinum	Kelly Moss Racing	16	10	5	7	13	474	**1st**
2019	IMSA SportsCar Championship - GTD	Audi Sport Team WRT Speedstar	1	0	0	0	1	30	47th
2019	Porsche Supercup	Team Project 1 - FACH	1	0	0	0	0	2	23rd
2020	IMSA SportsCar Championship - GTD	Heart of Racing Team	8	0	0	0	2	199	15th
2020	GT4 America Series - Silver	Team Panoz Racing	4	2	1	2	2	60	7th
2020	GT World Challenge Europe Endurance Cup	Garage 59	1	0	0	0	0	0	NC
2020	Intercontinental GT Challenge	Garage 59	1	0	0	0	0	2	20th
2021	IMSA SportsCar Championship - GTD	Heart of Racing Team	13	3	1	0	6	3111	**3rd**
2021	24H GT Series - GT4	Heart of Racing Team							
2022	IMSA SportsCar Championship - GTD	Heart of Racing Team	12	2	0	0	5	2898	**1st**
2022	24H GT Series - GT4	Heart of Racing Team							
2022	GT World Challenge Europe Endurance Cup	Beechdean AMR	1	0	0	0	0	0	NC
2022-23	Middle East Trophy - GT3	Heart of Racing Team by SPS							
2023	IMSA SportsCar Championship - GTD	Heart of Racing Team	11	2	3	1	3	3221	**2nd**
2023	GT4 America Series - Pro-Am	Heart of Racing Team	11	3	0	0	1	119	4th
2023	24H GT Series - GT3	Heart of Racing by SPS							
2024	GT4 America Series - Pro-Am	Heart of Racing Team	13	2	0	0	6	186	**2nd**
2024	IMSA SportsCar Championship - GTD	Heart of Racing Team	7	1	0	1	1	1676*	7th*
2024	IMSA SportsCar Championship - GTD Pro	Heart of Racing Team	2	0	0	1	1	604	27th
2024	24H Series - GT3	Heart of Racing by SPS	1	0	0	0	0	0	NC
2024	24 Hours of Le Mans - LMP2	Algarve Pro Racing	1	0	0	0	0	N/A	8th
2025	FIA World Endurance Championship - Hypercar	Aston Martin THOR Team	3	0	0	0	0	0	28th
2025	IMSA SportsCar Championship - GTP	Aston Martin THOR Team	8	0	0	0	1	2049	12th
2025	IMSA SportsCar Championship - GTD Pro	Heart of Racing Team	1	0	0	0	0	191	43rd
2025	IMSA SportsCar Championship - GTD	Heart of Racing Team	1	0	0	0	0	288	65th
2026	Intercontinental GT Challenge	Heart of Racing by SPS	1	0	0	0	0	0	NC
2026	IMSA SportsCar Championship - GTP	Aston Martin THOR Team	9	0	0	0	0	2242	14th
2026	FIA World Endurance Championship - Hypercar	Aston Martin THOR Team	1	0	0	0	0	0	29th
2026	IMSA SportsCar Championship - GTD	Heart of Racing Team	1	0	0	0	0	285	61st
2026-27	Asian Le Mans Series - GT3	Heart of Racing Team							

^{*} Season still in progress.

=== Complete IMSA SportsCar Championship results ===
(key) (Races in bold indicate pole position; races in italics indicate fastest lap)

Year	Team	Class	Make	Engine	1	2	3	4	5	6	7	8	9	10	11	12	Rank	Points	Ref
2019	Audi Sport Team WRT Speedstar	GTD	Audi R8 LMS Evo	Audi DAR 5.2 L V10	DAY; 3	SEB	MDO	DET	WGL	MOS	LIM	ELK	VIR	LGA	PET		47th	30	
2020	Heart of Racing	GTD	Aston Martin Vantage AMR GT3	Aston Martin M177 4.0 L Turbo V8	DAY; 18	DAY	SEB	ELK; DNS	VIR; 8	ATL; 6	MDO; 4	CLT; 3	PET; 11	LGA; 4	SEB; 2		15th	199	
2021	Heart of Racing	GTD	Aston Martin Vantage AMR GT3	Aston Martin M177 4.0 L Turbo V8	DAY; 5	SEB; 3	MDO; 4	DET; 1	WGL; 3	WGL; 3	**LIM**; 1	ELK; 4	LGA; 5	LBH; 6	VIR; 5	PET; 1	3rd	3111	
2022	Heart of Racing Team	GTD	Aston Martin Vantage AMR GT3	Aston Martin M177 4.0 L Turbo V8	DAY; 9	SEB; 15	LBH; 12	LGA; 7	MDO; 8	DET; 2	WGL; 1	MOS; 1	LIM; 2	ELK; 6	VIR; 2	PET; 7	1st	2898	
2023	Heart of Racing Team	GTD	Aston Martin Vantage AMR GT3	Aston Martin M177 4.0 L Turbo V8	DAY; 1	SEB; 15	LBH; 2	LGA; 8	WGL; 6	**MOS**; 4	LIM; 1	ELK; 7	VIR; 12	IMS; 4	**PET**; 5		2nd	3221	
2024	Heart of Racing Team	GTD	Aston Martin Vantage AMR GT3 Evo	Aston Martin M177 4.0 L Turbo V8	DAY; 22	SEB; 4	LBH; 14	LGA; 6		WGL; 16	MOS; 1	ELK; 9	VIR; 14				18th	1874	
2024	Heart of Racing Team	GTD Pro	Aston Martin Vantage AMR GT3 Evo	Aston Martin M177 4.0 L Turbo V8					DET					IMS; 6	PET; 3		27th	604	
2025	Heart of Racing Team	GTD Pro	Aston Martin Vantage AMR GT3 Evo	Aston Martin M177 4.0 L Turbo V8	DAY; 14												43rd	191	
2025	Heart of Racing Team	GTD	Aston Martin Vantage AMR GT3 Evo	Aston Martin M177 4.0 L Turbo V8							MOS; 5		VIR				65th	288	
2025	Aston Martin THOR Team	GTP	Aston Martin Valkyrie AMR-LMH	Aston Martin RA 6.5 L V12		SEB; 9	LBH; 8	LGA; 10	DET; 8	WGL; 9		ELK; 6		IMS; 11	PET; 2		12th	2049	
2026	Aston Martin THOR Team	GTP	Aston Martin Valkyrie AMR-LMH	Aston Martin RA 6.5 L V12	DAY; 10	SEB; 9	LBH; 9	LGA; 8	DET; 10	WGL; 11		ELK; 5	IMS; 8	PET; 5			14th	2242	
2026	Heart of Racing Team	GTD	Aston Martin Vantage AMR GT3 Evo	Aston Martin M177 4.0 L Turbo V8							**MOS**; 6						61st	285	

^{*} Season still in progress.

=== Complete FIA World Endurance Championship results ===
(key) (Races in bold indicate pole position; races in italics indicate fastest lap)

Year	Entrant	Class	Chassis	Engine	1	2	3	4	5	6	7	8	Rank	Points
2025	Aston Martin THOR Team	Hypercar	Aston Martin Valkyrie AMR-LMH	Aston Martin RA 6.5 L V12	QAT; 17	IMO	SPA	LMS; 11	SÃO	COA	FUJ	BHR; 7 (Note: De Angelis did not fulfil his mandated minimum drive time at the 8 Hours of Bahrain, meaning that he did not receive points for the event.)	28th	0
2026	Aston Martin THOR Team	Hypercar	Aston Martin Valkyrie AMR-LMH	Aston Martin RA 6.5 L V12	IMO	SPA	LMS; 13	SÃO	COA	FUJ	CAT	MNZ	29th	0

=== 24 Hours of Le Mans results ===
Year	Team	Co-Drivers	Car	Class	Laps	Pos.	Class Pos.
2024	(Portugal) Algarve Pro Racing	(United Kingdom) Olli Caldwell (Liechtenstein) Matthias Kaiser	Oreca 07-Gibson	LMP2	294	22nd	8th
2025	(United States) Aston Martin THOR Team	(Spain) Alex Riberas (Denmark) Marco Sørensen	Aston Martin Valkyrie AMR	Hypercar	383	12th	12th
2026	(United States) Aston Martin THOR Team	(Spain) Alex Riberas (Denmark) Marco Sørensen	Aston Martin Valkyrie AMR	Hypercar	372	14th	14th

== Notes ==
Sporting positions
Preceded by Shaun McKaigue	IMSA GT3 Cup Challenge Canada; Gold Champion; 2017	Succeeded by Michel Bonnet
Preceded by Zacharie Robichon	IMSA GT3 Cup Challenge Canada; Platinum Champion; 2019	Succeeded by None
Preceded by Trenton Estep	IMSA GT3 Cup Challenge USA; Platinum Champion; 2019	Succeeded by Jeff Kingsley
Preceded by Aaron Telitz; Jack Hawksworth	WeatherTech Sprint Cup; Champion; 2021; With: Ross Gunn	Succeeded by Bryan Sellers; Madison Snow
Preceded by Zacharie Robichon; Laurens Vanthoor	IMSA SportsCar Championship; GTD Champion; 2022	Succeeded by Bryan Sellers; Madison Snow
