= The Heart of Racing =

American auto racing team

- Founded: 2014
- Base: Seattle, Washington, United States
- Team principal(s): Ian James
- Founder(s): Ian James; Gabe Newell; Yahn Bernier
- Current series: FIA World Endurance Championship; GT4 America Series; IMSA SportsCar Championship; Middle East Trophy; GT America Series
- Former series: D1NZ; North Island Enduro Series; GT World Challenge Europe Endurance Cup; Porsche Carrera Cup Germany; Porsche Supercup; 24H Series
- Current drivers: (Canada) Roman De Angelis (Germany) Mario Farnbacher (United States) Hannah Greenemeier (United States) Hannah Grisham (United Kingdom) Ross Gunn (United Kingdom) Ian James (New Zealand) Darren Kelly (Italy) Daniel Mancinelli (United States) Gray Newell (Spain) Alex Riberas (Canada) Zacharie Robichon
- Noted drivers: (Belgium) Maxime Martin (Denmark) Marco Sørensen
- Teams' Championships: 2019, 2021 D1NZ, 2021 North Island Enduro Series, 2022 IMSA GTD
- Drivers' Championships: 2019, 2021 D1NZ, 2021 North Island Enduro Series, 2022 IMSA GTD
- Website: www.theheartofracing.com

The Heart of Racing (also known as the Heart of Racing Team or simply Heart of Racing) is an American auto racing team established by British racing driver Ian James, American businessman Gabe Newell, and American developer Yahn Bernier. The team primarily competes in sports car racing with factory support from Aston Martin. Additionally, Heart of Racing races in support of Seattle Children's Hospital in Seattle, Washington.

== Racing history ==
The name the Heart of Racing began as a fundraising campaign created by Team Seattle in 1997 to benefit Seattle Children’s Hospital in Seattle, Washington. That campaign has continued ever since, with the hospital receiving proceeds from every race in which the team competes. Former Team Seattle driver Ian James subsequently founded a racing team of the same name; together with Team Seattle and Alex Job Racing, it contested the IMSA SportsCar Championship for three seasons, concluding its initial programme in 2016.

From 2014 to 2016, the combined operation fielded Porsche 911 GT3 cars and finished inside the top five of IMSA’s GT Daytona (GTD) class in two of those three seasons. In 2015 The Heart of Racing also supported Michael Ammermüller and Lechner Racing in the Porsche Carrera Cup Germany, where Ammermüller placed fourth overall with six podium finishes. The team broadened its activities into drifting, winning the D1NZ series in both the 2019 and 2021 seasons with New Zealander Darren Kelly in a modified Nissan GT‑R.

=== 2020 ===
After a three‑year hiatus, the Heart of Racing returned to IMSA competition in 2020, once again in the GTD class, this time with factory support from Aston Martin. The driver line‑up comprised Roman De Angelis, Alex Riberas, Ian James, Nicki Thiim and Darren Turner. The team’s best result that year was second place at the 12 Hours of Sebring.

=== 2021 ===
The team’s first victory came at the 2021 Detroit Sports Car Classic, where Roman De Angelis and Ross Gunn were promoted to first place after CarBahn with Peregrine Racing was disqualified for breaching the mandatory 40‑second refuelling rule. De Angelis and Gunn won again at the 2021 Northeast Grand Prix. Joined by Ian James, they added a third win at that season’s Petit Le Mans, and the No. 23 Aston Martin ultimately finished third in the GTD championship standings.

The Heart of Racing also entered the 2021 GT4 America Series with an Aston Martin Vantage AMR GT4 driven by Ian James and Gray Newell, son of Gabe Newell. The pair finished 13th in Pro‑Am, taking a victory in the second race at Watkins Glen. In the 2023 GT4 America season, De Angelis and Newell placed fourth in Pro‑Am, while Hannah Grisham and Rianna O'Meara‑Hunt finished sixth in the Am class. Additionally, Alex Riberas and Darren Kelly secured the 2021 North Island Enduro Series title in New Zealand.

=== 2022 ===
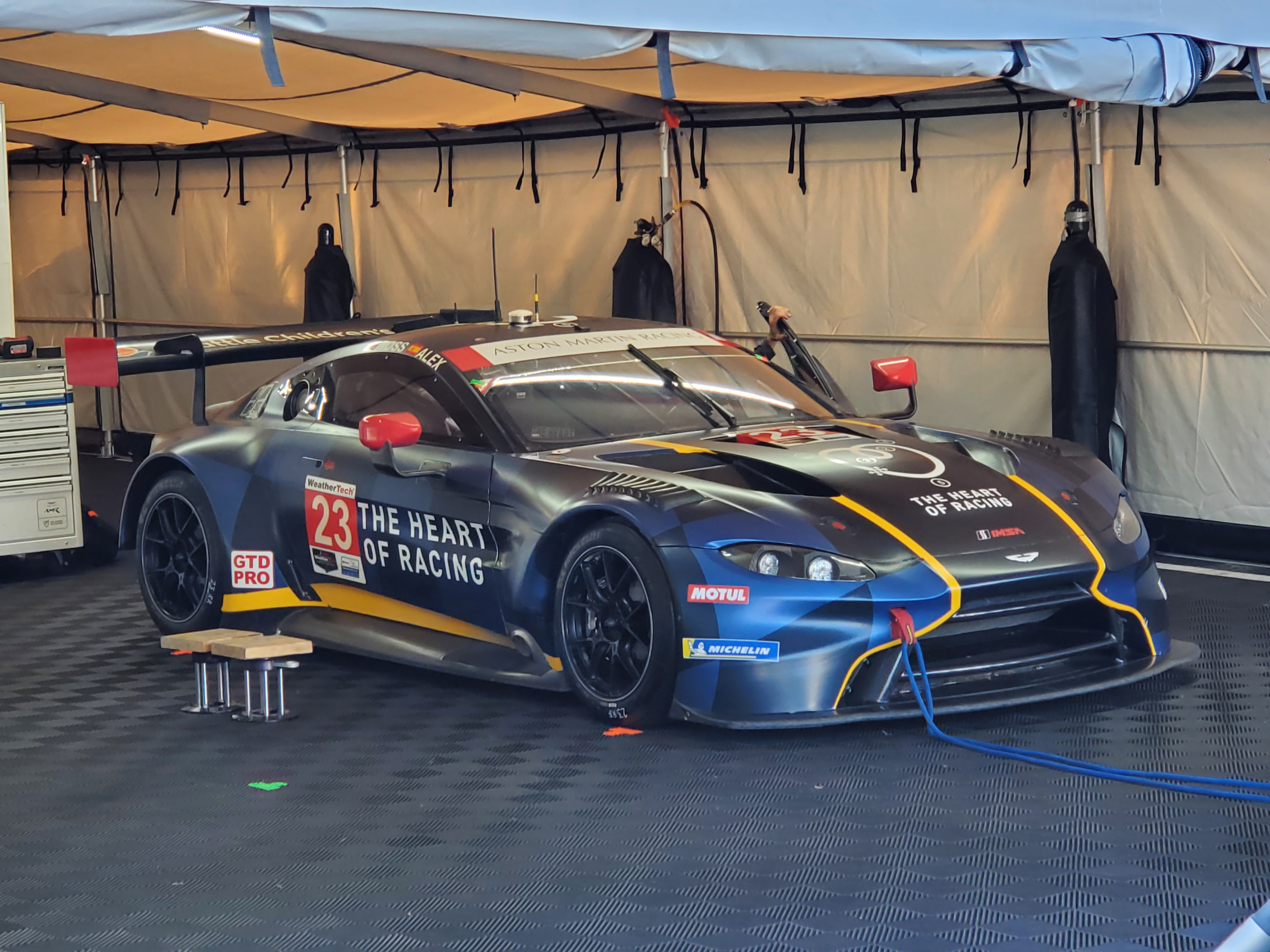
The Heart of Racing's Aston Martin Vantage AMR GT3 in the paddock during the 2022 Sahlen's Six Hours of the Glen

For the 2022 season, the Heart of Racing expanded its IMSA programme by entering a second No. 23 Aston Martin Vantage in the GTD Pro class, with Alex Riberas and Ross Gunn contesting the full season. Roman De Angelis returned to drive the No. 27 entry in the GTD class. Ian James, Darren Turner, Maxime Martin, and Tom Gamble also joined the team for selected rounds across both classes.

Each car secured two race victories during the season, including a standout performance at the 2022 Sahlen’s Six Hours of The Glen, where the team achieved a rare double class win - triumphing in both GTD and GTD Pro. The No. 23 car concluded the season fourth in the GTD Pro standings, while the No. 27 entry and De Angelis were crowned GTD class champions.

The team also supported the development of Darren Kelly’s Formula Drift Aston Martin Vantage, which debuted in the 2022 Formula D season. The drift car was powered by a twin‑supercharged 6.0‑litre Aston Martin V12 and incorporated components from both the GT3 and GT4 versions of the Vantage.

=== 2023 ===
In the 2023 season, both Heart of Racing entries finished inside the top five of their respective IMSA championship classes: the No. 23 Aston Martin placed fifth in GTD Pro, while the No. 27 car secured second place in the GTD standings. At the 24 Hours of Daytona, the Heart of Racing claimed its first class victory. The No. 27 GTD entry, driven by Roman De Angelis, Marco Sørensen, Ian James, and Darren Turner, not only won its class but also finished ahead of the GTD Pro-winning car.

The No. 23 car also added two more wins during the season, with victories at Road America and Lime Rock Park. The No. 27 entry also triumphed at Lime Rock, marking another double class win for the team.

Following the retirement of Paul Dalla Lana, the Heart of Racing took over the NorthWest AMR entry in the 2023 FIA World Endurance Championship (WEC) as part of a mid‑season transition, beginning with the 6 Hours of Spa‑Francorchamps. The revised driver line‑up featured Alex Riberas, Ian James, and Daniel Mancinelli. Although the team continued to race under the NorthWest AMR banner in compliance with WEC regulations, they delivered consistent results, finishing in the top seven at all remaining rounds - except Monza - including a third-place podium finish at the 8 Hours of Bahrain.

Later in 2023, the Heart of Racing announced that it would lead Aston Martin’s revived Valkyrie AMR Pro programme for the 2025 season, marking the manufacturer's renewed commitment to top-class endurance racing following its earlier decision in 2020 to pause the project in favour of Formula One. The team is partnering with Multimatic to support the technical and operational aspects of the programme.

=== 2024 ===
In 2024, the Heart of Racing confirmed its plans to field two Aston Martin Valkyrie prototypes in the Hypercar class for the 2025 FIA World Endurance Championship and the 24 Hours of Le Mans. This announcement followed a regulation change by WEC organisers requiring all Hypercar entrants to run a minimum of two cars in order to compete at Le Mans. The car, officially named the Valkyrie AMR‑LMH, completed its first shakedown tests in July at Silverstone Circuit and Donington Park. Participating in the test were Aston Martin factory driver Darren Turner, Multimatic driver Harry Tincknell, and Heart of Racing’s Mario Farnbacher.

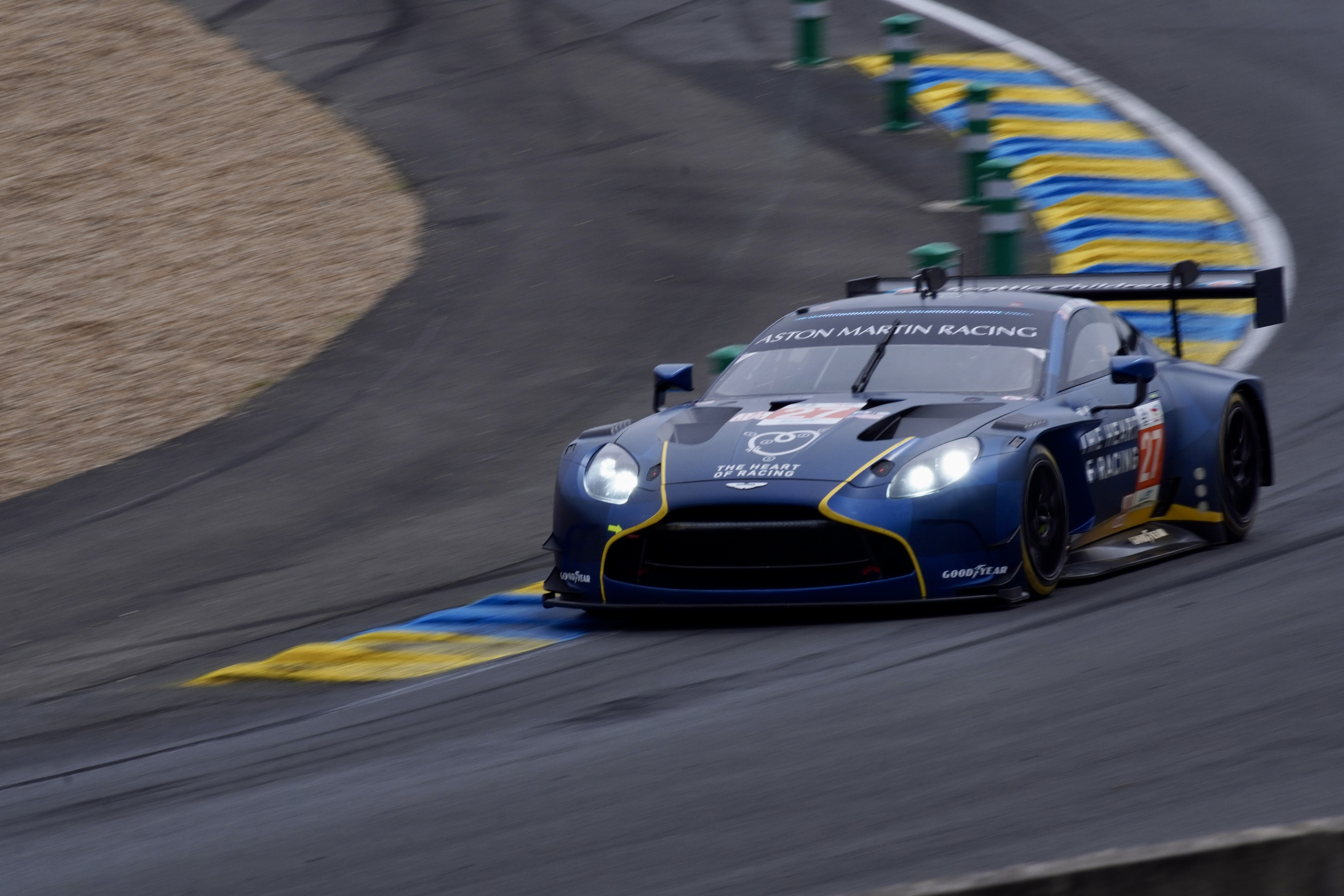
The Heart of Racing's Aston Martin Vantage AMR GT3 Evo at the 2024 24 Hours of Le Mans

In the 2024 FIA World Endurance Championship, the Heart of Racing entered under its own name for the first time, fully replacing NorthWest AMR as the second official Aston Martin team. The team retained its existing driver line-up of Ian James, Alex Riberas, and Daniel Mancinelli. During the season, the team secured its first LMGT3 class victory at the 2024 Lone Star Le Mans, having started from pole position. Over the course of the campaign, they collected three podium finishes and concluded the season fifth in the LMGT3 championship standings.

In the 2024 IMSA SportsCar Championship, Mario Farnbacher joined the team to replace David Pittard in the No. 23 GTD Pro entry, partnering with Ross Gunn and Alex Riberas. Spencer Pumpelly and Zacharie Robichon took over from Darren Turner in the No. 27 GTD entry. At the IMSA Battle on the Bricks, the No. 27 car was reclassified to the GTD Pro class and ran under the number No. 027. Late in the season, Ross Gunn entered a close battle for the GTD Pro Drivers’ Championship with AO Racing’s Laurin Heinrich. At the final round, the 2024 Petit Le Mans, Gunn had a chance to claim the title following a gearbox issue that hindered Heinrich’s team. However, Gunn was unable to overtake Daniel Serra for second place, ultimately finishing third in the race and second in the final championship standings.

In the 2024 GT4 America Series, the Heart of Racing participated in the first four rounds. Roman De Angelis and Gray Newell achieved two podium finishes during that span.

== Race results ==
=== 24 Hours of Le Mans results ===
| Year | Entrant | No. | Car | Drivers | Class | Laps | Pos. | Class Pos. |
|---|---|---|---|---|---|---|---|---|
| 2023 | (Canada) NorthWest AMR (Note: Paul Dalla Lana retired from racing and withdrew his NorthWest AMR team with immediate effect a week before the 2023 6 Hours of Spa-Francorchamps. Heart of Racing took over the entry, but kept the NorthWest AMR name and number to conform with the championship regulations.) | 98 | Aston Martin Vantage AMR | (United Kingdom) Ian James (Italy) Daniel Mancinelli (Spain) Alex Riberas | LMGTE Am | 310 | 33rd | 6th |
| 2024 | (United States) Heart of Racing Team | 27 | Aston Martin Vantage AMR GT3 Evo | (United Kingdom) Ian James (Italy) Daniel Mancinelli (Spain) Alex Riberas | LMGT3 | 196 | DNF | DNF |
| 2025 | (United States) Aston Martin THOR Team | 007 | Aston Martin Valkyrie AMR | (United Kingdom) Tom Gamble (United Kingdom) Ross Gunn (United Kingdom) Harry Tincknell | Hypercar | 381 | 14th | 14th |
| 2025 | (United States) Aston Martin THOR Team | 009 | Aston Martin Valkyrie AMR | (Canada) Roman De Angelis (Spain) Alex Riberas (Denmark) Marco Sørensen | Hypercar | 383 | 12th | 12th |
| 2025 | (United States) Heart of Racing Team | 27 | Aston Martin Vantage AMR GT3 Evo | (Italy) Mattia Drudi (United Kingdom) Ian James (Canada) Zacharie Robichon | LMGT3 | 341 | 36th | 4th |
| 2026 | (United States) Aston Martin THOR Team | 007 | Aston Martin Valkyrie AMR | (United Kingdom) Tom Gamble (United Kingdom) Ross Gunn (United Kingdom) Harry Tincknell | Hypercar | 379 | 8th | 8th |
| 2026 | (United States) Aston Martin THOR Team | 009 | Aston Martin Valkyrie AMR | (Canada) Roman De Angelis (Spain) Alex Riberas (Denmark) Marco Sørensen | Hypercar | 372 | 14th | 14th |
| 2026 | (United States) Heart of Racing Team | 23 | Aston Martin Vantage AMR GT3 Evo | (United Kingdom) Jonny Adam (Brazil) Eduardo Barrichello (United States) Gray Newell | LMGT3 | 335 | 35th | 3rd |
| 2026 | (United States) Heart of Racing Team | 27 | Aston Martin Vantage AMR GT3 Evo | (Italy) Mattia Drudi (United Kingdom) Ian James (Canada) Zacharie Robichon | LMGT3 | 291 | DNF | DNF |

=== Complete FIA World Endurance Championship results ===
| Year | Entrant | Class | No | Chassis | Engine | Drivers | 1 | 2 | 3 | 4 | 5 | 6 | 7 | 8 | Pos. | Pts |
|---|---|---|---|---|---|---|---|---|---|---|---|---|---|---|---|---|
| 2023 | (Canada) NorthWest AMR | LMGTE Am | 98 | Aston Martin Vantage AMR | Aston Martin M177 4.0 L Turbo V8 | (United Kingdom) Ian James (Italy) Daniel Mancinelli (Spain) Alex Riberas | SEB | POR | SPA; 7 | LMS; 6 | MZA | FUJ; 7 | BHR; 3 | | 9th | 51 |
| 2024 | (United States) Heart of Racing Team | LMGT3 | 27 | Aston Martin Vantage AMR GT3 Evo | Aston Martin M177 4.0 L Turbo V8 | (United Kingdom) Ian James (Italy) Daniel Mancinelli (Spain) Alex Riberas | QAT; 2 | ITA; 5 | SPA; 11 | LMS; Ret | SAP; 2 | COA; 1 | FUJ; 9 | BHR; 11 | 5th | 83 |
| 2025* | (United States) Heart of Racing Team | LMGT3 | 27 | Aston Martin Vantage AMR GT3 Evo | Aston Martin M177 4.0 L Turbo V8 | (United Kingdom) Ian James (Italy) Mattia Drudi (Canada) Zacharie Robichon | QAT; 6 | ITA; Ret | SPA; 5 | LMS; 4 | SAO; 14 | COA; 5 | FUJ; 7 | BHR; 3 | 4th | 86 |

* Season still in progress.

=== Complete IMSA SportsCar Championship results ===
| Year | Entrant | Class | No | Chassis | Engine | Drivers | 1 | 2 | 3 | 4 | 5 | 6 | 7 | 8 | 9 | 10 | 11 | 12 | Pos. | Pts | MEC |
|---|---|---|---|---|---|---|---|---|---|---|---|---|---|---|---|---|---|---|---|---|---|
| 2020 | (United States) Heart of Racing Team | GTD | 23 | Aston Martin Vantage AMR GT3 | Aston Martin M177 4.0 L Turbo V8 | (Canada) Roman De Angelis (United Kingdom) Ian James (Spain) Alex Riberas (Denmark) Nicki Thiim (United Kingdom) Darren Turner | DAY1; 18 | DAY2 | SEB1 | ELK; DNS | VIR; 8 | ATL1; 6 | MOH; 4 | CLT; 3 | ATL2; 11 | LGA; 4 | SEB2; 2 | | 10th | 199 | 27 |
| 2021 | (United States) Heart of Racing Team | GTD | 23 | Aston Martin Vantage AMR GT3 | Aston Martin M177 4.0 L Turbo V8 | (Canada) Roman De Angelis (United Kingdom) Ross Gunn (United Kingdom) Ian James (United Kingdom) Darren Turner | DAY; 5 | SEB; 3 | MOH; 4 | BEL; 1 | WGL1; 3 | WGL2; 3 | LIM; 1 | ELK; 4 | LGA; 5 | LBH; 6 | VIR; 5 | ATL; 1 | 3rd | 3111 | 34 |
| 2021 | (United States) Heart of Racing Team | GTD | 27 | Aston Martin Vantage AMR GT3 | Aston Martin M177 4.0 L Turbo V8 | (United Kingdom) Ian James (Spain) Alex Riberas | DAY | SEB | MOH | BEL | WGL1 | WGL2 | LIM | ELK | LGA; 12 | LBH; 12 | VIR; 6 | ATL | 17th | 669 | - |
| 2022 | (United States) Heart of Racing Team | GTD Pro | 23 | Aston Martin Vantage AMR GT3 | Aston Martin M177 4.0 L Turbo V8 | (United Kingdom) Tom Gamble (United Kingdom) Ross Gunn (Belgium) Maxime Martin (Spain) Alex Riberas | DAY; 13 | SEB; 11 | LBH; 1 | LGA; 5 | WGL; 1 | MOS; 3 | LIM; 2 | ELK; 4 | VIR; 4 | ATL; 4 | | | 4th | 3103 | 31 |
| 2022 | (United States) Heart of Racing Team | GTD | 27 | Aston Martin Vantage AMR GT3 | Aston Martin M177 4.0 L Turbo V8 | (Canada) Roman De Angelis (United Kingdom) Tom Gamble (United Kingdom) Ross Gunn (United Kingdom) Ian James (Belgium) Maxime Martin (United Kingdom) Darren Turner | DAY; 9 | SEB; 15 | LBH; 12 | LGA; 7 | MOH; 8 | BEL; 2 | WGL; 1 | MOS; 1 | LIM; 2 | ELK; 6 | VIR; 2 | ATL; 7 | 1st | 2898 | 30 |
| 2023 | (United States) Heart of Racing Team | GTD Pro | 23 | Aston Martin Vantage AMR GT3 | Aston Martin M177 4.0 L Turbo V8 | (United Kingdom) Ross Gunn (United Kingdom) David Pittard (Spain) Alex Riberas | DAY; 7 | SEB; 8 | LBH; 4 | LGA; 5 | WGL; 6 | MOS; 5 | LIM; 1 | ELK; 1 | VIR; 4 | IMS; 2 | ATL; 4 | | 5th | 3427 | 32 |
| 2023 | (United States) Heart of Racing Team | GTD | 27 | Aston Martin Vantage AMR GT3 | Aston Martin M177 4.0 L Turbo V8 | (Canada) Roman De Angelis (United Kingdom) Ian James (Denmark) Marco Sørensen (United Kingdom) Darren Turner | DAY; 1 | SEB; 15 | LBH; 2 | LGA; 8 | WGL; 6 | MOS; 4 | LIM; 1 | ELK; 7 | VIR; 12 | IMS; 4 | ATL; 5 | | 2nd | 3221 | 36 |
| 2024 | (United States) Heart of Racing Team | GTD Pro | 23 | Aston Martin Vantage AMR GT3 Evo | Aston Martin M177 4.0 L Turbo V8 | (Germany) Mario Farnbacher (United Kingdom) Ross Gunn (Spain) Alex Riberas | DAY; 4 | SEB; 5 | LGA; 6 | DET; 3 | WGL; 1 | MOS; 5 | ELK; 3 | VIR; 3 | IMS; 5 | ATL; 3 | | | 2nd | 3118 | 36 |
| 2024 | (United States) Heart of Racing Team | GTD | 27 | Aston Martin Vantage AMR GT3 Evo | Aston Martin M177 4.0 L Turbo V8 | (Canada) Roman De Angelis (United Kingdom) Ian James (United States) Spencer Pumpelly (Canada) Zacharie Robichon (Denmark) Marco Sørensen | DAY; 22 | SEB; 4 | LBH; 14 | LGA; 4 | WGL; 16 | MOS; 1 | ELK; 9 | VIR; 2 | IMS | ATL | | | 14th | 1874 | 20 |
| 2025 | (United States) Aston Martin THOR Team | GTP | 23 | Aston Martin Valkyrie AMR | Aston Martin RA 6.5 L V12 | (Canada) Roman De Angelis (United Kingdom) Ross Gunn (Spain) Alex Riberas | DAY | SEB; 9 | LBH; 8 | LGA; 10 | DET; 8 | WGL; 10 | ELK; 6 | IMS; 11 | ATL; 2 | | | | 11th | 2049 | 22 |
| 2025 | (United States) Heart of Racing Team | GTD Pro | 007 | Aston Martin Vantage AMR GT3 Evo | Aston Martin M177 4.0 L Turbo V8 | (Canada) Roman De Angelis (United Kingdom) Ross Gunn (Spain) Alex Riberas (Denmark) Marco Sørensen | DAY; 14 | SEB | LGA | DET | WGL | MOS | ELK | VIR | IMS | ATL | | | 16th | 191 | 8 |
| 2025 | (United States) Heart of Racing Team | GTD | 27 | Aston Martin Vantage AMR GT3 Evo | Aston Martin M177 4.0 L Turbo V8 | (United Kingdom) Casper Stevenson (United Kingdom) Tom Gamble (Canada) Zacharie Robichon (Italy) Mattia Drudi (United Kingdom) Darren Turner (Canada) Roman De Angelis | DAY; 3 | SEB; 3 | LBH; 9 | LGA; 12 | WGL; 1 | MOS; 5 | ELK; 9 | VIR; 3 | IMS; 11 | ATL; 4 | | | 2nd | 2898 | 38 |
| 2026* | (United States) Aston Martin THOR Team | GTP | 23 | Aston Martin Valkyrie AMR | Aston Martin RA 6.5 L V12 | (Canada) Roman De Angelis (United Kingdom) Ross Gunn (Spain) Alex Riberas | DAY; 10 | SEB | LBH | LGA | DET | WGL | ELK | IMS | ATL | | | | 10th | 231 | 8 |
| 2026* | (United States) Heart of Racing Team | GTD | 27 | Aston Martin Vantage AMR GT3 Evo | Aston Martin M177 4.0 L Turbo V8 | (Brazil) Eduardo Barrichello (Italy) Mattia Drudi (United Kingdom) Tom Gamble (Canada) Zacharie Robichon | DAY; 3 | SEB | LBH | LGA | WGL | MOS | ELK | VIR | IMS | ATL | | | 3rd | 335 | 10 |

* Season still in progress.

== Race wins ==
=== IMSA SportsCar Championship wins ===
| # | Season | Date | Classes | Track / Race | No. | Winning drivers | Chassis | Engine |
|---|---|---|---|---|---|---|---|---|
| 1 | 2021 | June 12 | GTD | Raceway at Belle Isle Park | 23 | Roman De Angelis / Ross Gunn | Aston Martin Vantage AMR GT3 | Mercedes-Benz M177 4.0L Turbo V8 |
| 2 | 2021 | July 17 | GTD | Lime Rock Park | 23 | Roman De Angelis / Ross Gunn | Aston Martin Vantage AMR GT3 | Mercedes-Benz M177 4.0L Turbo V8 |
| 3 | 2021 | November 13 | GTD | Road Atlanta | 23 | Roman De Angelis / Ross Gunn / Ian James | Aston Martin Vantage AMR GT3 | Aston Martin 4.0 L Turbo V8 |
| 4 | 2022 | April 9 | GTD Pro | Long Beach Street Circuit | 23 | Ross Gunn / Alex Riberas | Aston Martin Vantage AMR GT3 | Aston Martin 4.0 L Turbo V8 |
| 6 | 2022 | June 26 | GTD | Watkins Glen International | 27 | Roman De Angelis / Maxime Martin / Ian James | Aston Martin Vantage AMR GT3 | Aston Martin 4.0 L Turbo V8 |
| 5 | 2022 | June 26 | GTD Pro | Watkins Glen International | 23 | Ross Gunn / Alex Riberas | Aston Martin Vantage AMR GT3 | Aston Martin 4.0 L Turbo V8 |
| 6 | 2022 | July 3 | GTD | Canadian Tire Motorsports Park | 27 | Roman De Angelis / Maxime Martin | Aston Martin Vantage AMR GT3 | Aston Martin 4.0 L Turbo V8 |
| 7 | 2023 | January 28–29 | GTD | Daytona International Speedway | 27 | Roman De Angelis / Ian James / Marco Sørensen / Darren Turner | Aston Martin Vantage AMR GT3 | Aston Martin 4.0 L Turbo V8 |
| 8 | 2023 | July 22 | GTD Pro | Lime Rock Park | 23 | Ross Gunn / Alex Riberas | Aston Martin Vantage AMR GT3 | Aston Martin 4.0 L Turbo V8 |
| 9 | 2023 | July 22 | GTD | Lime Rock Park | 27 | Roman De Angelis / Marco Sørensen | Aston Martin Vantage AMR GT3 | Aston Martin 4.0 L Turbo V8 |
| 10 | 2023 | August 6 | GTD Pro | Road America | 23 | Ross Gunn / Alex Riberas | Aston Martin Vantage AMR GT3 | Aston Martin 4.0 L Turbo V8 |
| 11 | 2024 | June 23 | GTD Pro | Watkins Glen International | 23 | Ross Gunn / Alex Riberas | Aston Martin Vantage AMR GT3 Evo | Aston Martin M177 4.0 L Turbo V8 |
| 12 | 2024 | July 14 | GTD | Canadian Tire Motorsports Park | 27 | Roman De Angelis / Spencer Pumpelly | Aston Martin Vantage AMR GT3 Evo | Aston Martin M177 4.0 L Turbo V8 |
| 13 | 2025 | June 22 | GTD | Watkins Glen International | 27 | Tom Gamble / Zacharie Robichon / Casper Stevenson | Aston Martin Vantage AMR GT3 Evo | Aston Martin M177 4.0 L Turbo V8 |

=== FIA World Endurance Championship wins ===
| # | Season | Date | Classes | Track / Race | No. | Winning drivers | Chassis | Engine |
|---|---|---|---|---|---|---|---|---|
| 1 | 2024 | September 1 | LMGT3 | Circuit of the Americas | 27 | Ian James / Daniel Mancinelli / Alex Riberas | Aston Martin Vantage AMR GT3 Evo | Aston Martin M177 4.0 L Turbo V8 |

== See also ==
- Team Seattle
