= 2021 Detroit Sports Car Classic =

Fourth round of the 2021 IMSA SportsCar Championship Season

Track map of The Raceway on Belle Isle

The 2021 Detroit SportsCar Classic was a sports car race sanctioned by the International Motor Sports Association (IMSA). The race was held at The Raceway on Belle Isle in Detroit, Michigan on June 12, 2021. This race was the fourth round of the 2021 IMSA SportsCar Championship, and the second round of the 2021 WeatherTech Sprint Cup.

== Background ==
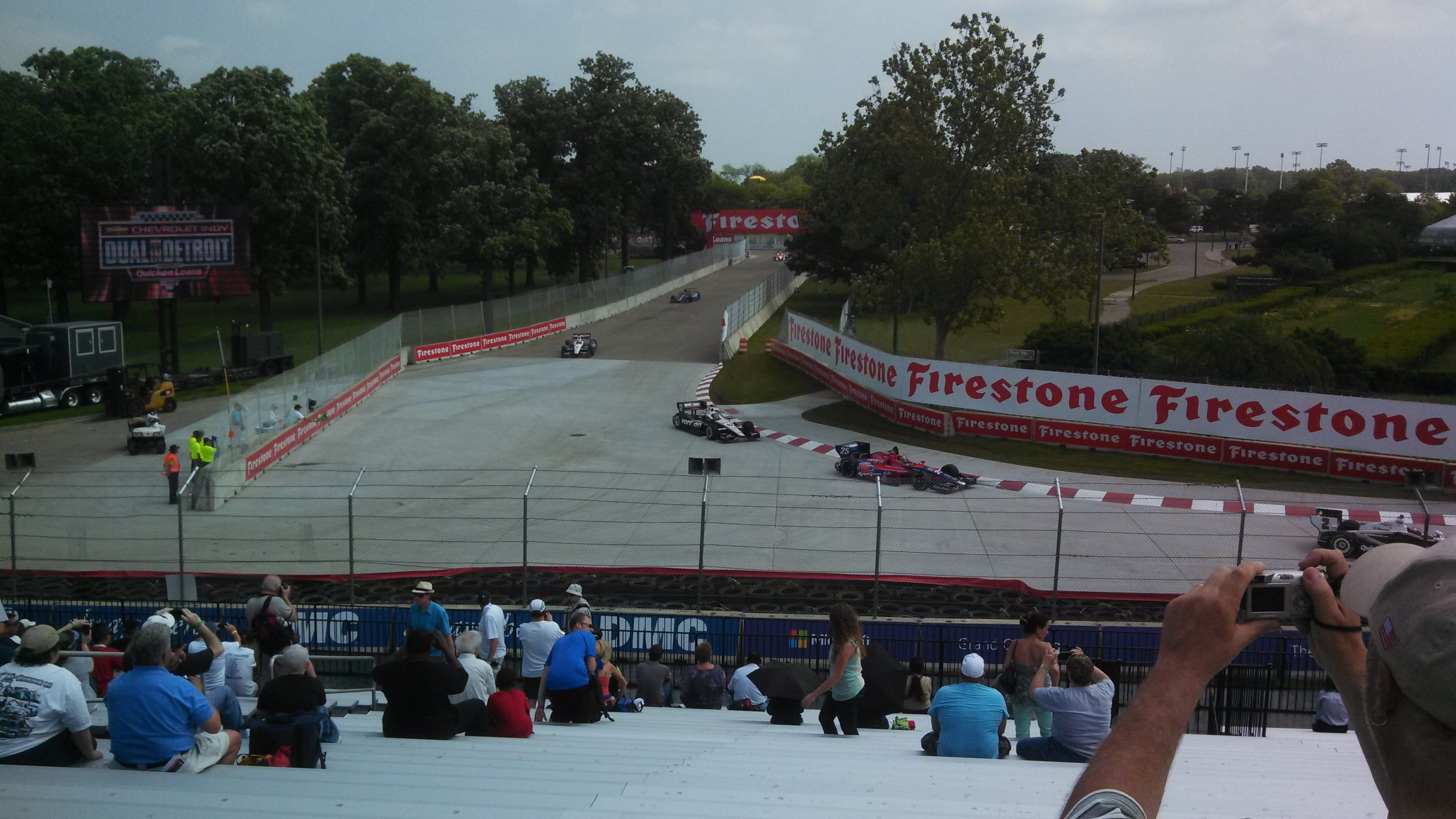
The Raceway on Belle Isle, where the race was held.

International Motor Sports Association's (IMSA) president John Doonan confirmed the race was part of the schedule for the 2021 IMSA SportsCar Championship (IMSA SCC) in September 2020. It was the seventh year the event was held as part of the WeatherTech SportsCar Championship, and the eleventh annual running of the race, counting the period between 2007 and 2013 when it was a round of the Rolex Sports Car Series and the American Le Mans Series respectively. The 2021 Detroit Sports Car Classic was the fourth of twelve scheduled sports car races of 2021 by IMSA, the shortest in terms of time, and was the second round of the WeatherTech Sprint Cup. The race was held at the fourteen-turn 2.350 mi (3.782 km) Belle Isle Park in Detroit, Michigan.

Unlike its predecessors, the race was initially scheduled to be a standalone event, relinquishing its traditional joint weekend with the IndyCar Series in an attempt to avoid conflict with the 2021 24 Hours of Le Mans. However, with the postponement of the Le Mans race to August, the race weekend was pushed back a week, allowing it to run in conjunction with the IndyCar double-header. While the reschedule alleviated a conflict with the Nürburgring 24 Hours, it fell on the same weekend as the WEC race at Portimão, leading to a further conflict for WeatherTech Racing. The classes competing at the event were also shuffled, as the LMP2 class was replaced with GTLM, which wouldn't score points towards the overall championship. The DPi and GTD classes remained on the entry list from the initial date, with the latter still only scoring points towards the WeatherTech Sprint Cup.

The race also marked the first event since the dawn of the COVID-19 pandemic that fans would be allowed paddock access, in accordance with the lifting of outdoor venue gathering restrictions in the state of Michigan.

Before the race, Filipe Albuquerque and Ricky Taylor led the DPi Drivers' Championship with 1070 points, ahead of Oliver Jarvis and Harry Tincknell in second with 1015 points. Nicky Catsburg, Antonio García, and Jordan Taylor led the GTLM Drivers' Championship with 697 points, 41 points ahead of Cooper MacNeil. With 920 points, the GTD Drivers' Championship was led by Bill Auberlen and Robby Foley. Acura, Chevrolet, and BMW were leading their respective Manufacturers' Championships, while WTR-Konica Minolta Acura, Corvette Racing, and Turner Motorsport each led their own Teams' Championships.

=== Entries ===
A total of 20 cars took part in the event, split across three classes. 6 cars were entered in DPi, 2 in GTLM, and 12 in GTD. Although no notable changes occurred in the DPi class, a handful of GTD competitors elected to forego the round due to its championship point output only counting for the WeatherTech Sprint Cup; namely Magnus Racing, Wright Motorsports, and Pfaff Motorsports. Buoying the GTD numbers, however, was SunEnergy1 Racing, who returned after skipping the Mid-Ohio round. In GTLM, the lone competitors were the two Corvettes, in line with WeatherTech Racing's expected absence.

After the initial entry list was released, a pair of driver changes were made prior to the race weekend. Marco Mapelli joined Misha Goikhberg in the Grasser Racing Team entry, while Townsend Bell subbed for Zach Veach, who missed the round after testing positive for COVID-19, in the Vasser Sullivan Racing No. 12.

== Practice ==
There were two practice sessions preceding the start of the race on Saturday, both on Friday. The first session lasted 90 minutes on Friday morning while the second session lasted 100 minutes on Friday afternoon.

=== Practice 1 ===
The first practice session took place at 8:00 am ET on Friday and ended with Tristan Vautier topping the charts for JDC-Mustang Sampling Racing, with a lap time of 1:21.588, ahead of the No. 10 Acura of Ricky Taylor. Nick Tandy set the fastest time in GTLM. The GTD class was topped by the No. 76 Compass Racing Acura NSX GT3 Evo of Mario Farnbacher with a time of 1:30.932. Richard Heistand was second fastest in the No. 39 Audi followed by Jack Hawksworth in the No. 14 Lexus. The session was stopped for 8 minutes when the No. 1 Paul Miller Racing Lamborghini Huracán GT3 Evo of Madison Snow stopped at turn three.

| Pos. | Class | No. | Team | Driver | Time | Gap |
|---|---|---|---|---|---|---|
| 1 | DPi | 5 | JDC-Mustang Sampling Racing | Tristan Vautier | 1:21.588 | _ |
| 2 | DPi | 10 | WTR-Konica Minolta Acura | Ricky Taylor | 1:21.684 | +0.096 |
| 3 | DPi | 01 | Cadillac Chip Ganassi Racing | Kevin Magnussen | 1:21.775 | +0.187 |

=== Practice 2 ===
The second and final practice session took place at 12:00 pm ET on Friday and ended with Kevin Magnussen topping the charts for Cadillac Chip Ganassi Racing, with a lap time of 1:20.068. Pipo Derani's No. 31 Cadillac was second fastest followed by Loïc Duval in the No. 5 Cadillac. Tommy Milner set the fastest time in GTLM. The GTD class was topped by the No. 14 Vasser Sullivan Racing Lexus RC F GT3 of Jack Hawksworth with a time of 1:30.495, ahead of Richard Heistand in the No. 39 Audi.

| Pos. | Class | No. | Team | Driver | Time | Gap |
|---|---|---|---|---|---|---|
| 1 | DPi | 01 | Cadillac Chip Ganassi Racing | Kevin Magnussen | 1:20.068 | _ |
| 2 | DPi | 31 | Whelen Engineering Racing | Pipo Derani | 1:20.226 | +0.158 |
| 3 | DPi | 5 | JDC-Mustang Sampling Racing | Loïc Duval | 1:20.281 | +0.213 |

== Qualifying ==
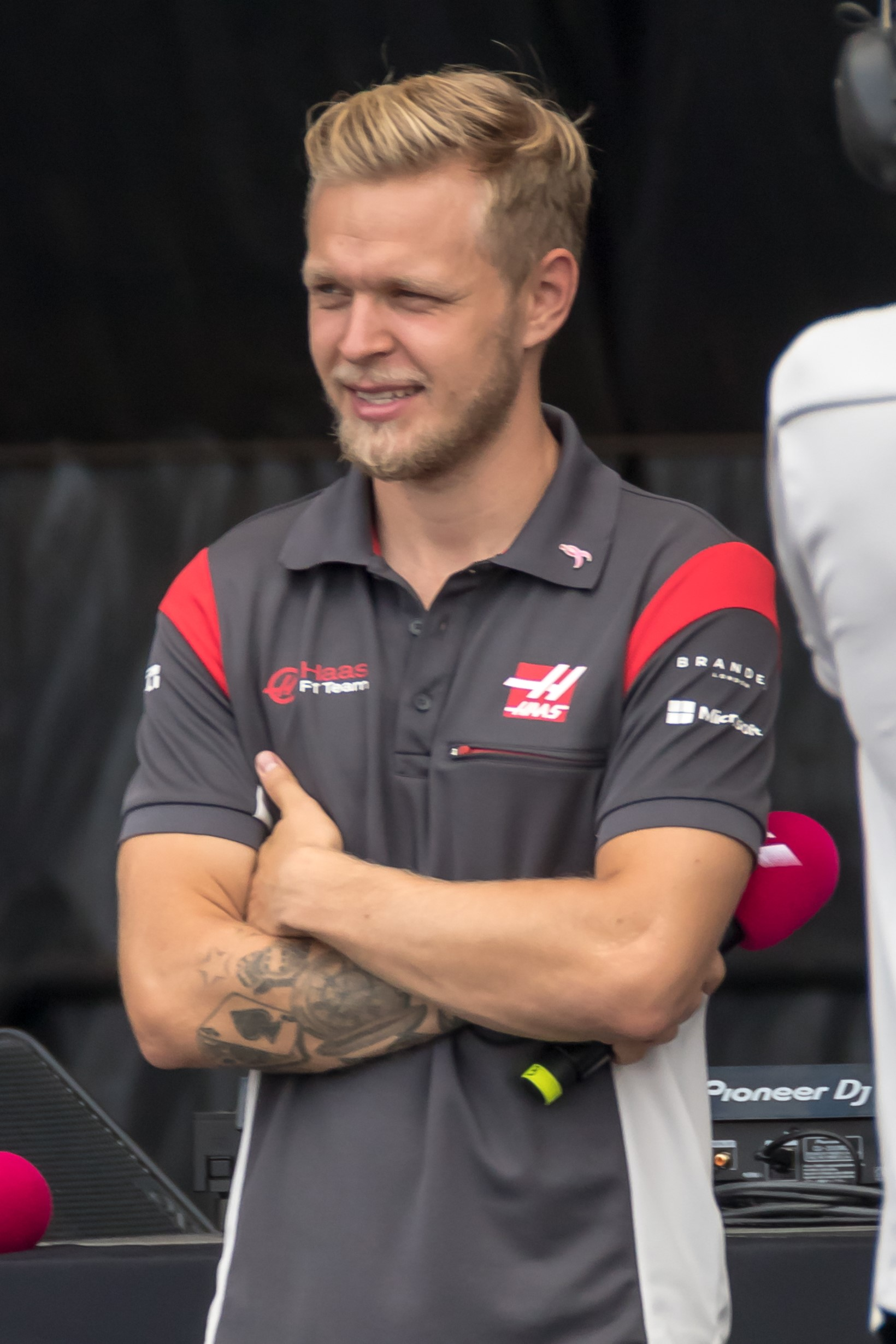
Kevin Magnussen (pictured in 2017) secured the overall pole position for Cadillac Chip Ganassi Racing.

Qualifying was broken into three sessions. The first was for cars in the GTD class. Richard Heinstand qualified on pole for the class driving the No. 39 car for CarBahn Motorsports with Peregrine Racing, beating Frankie Montecalvo in the No. 12 Vasser Sullivan Racing entry by less than one-tenth of a second. Roman De Angelis was third fastest followed by Robby Foley in the No. 96 Turner Motorsport entry.

The second session was for cars in the GTLM and GTD classes. Nick Tandy qualified on pole in GTLM driving the No. 4 car for Corvette Racing, besting teammate Jordan Taylor in the sister No. 3 Corvette Racing entry by more than three-tenths of a second. Mario Farnbacher set the fastest time in the GTD points paying session and earned 35 WeatherTech Sprint Cup points. The No. 14 Vasser Sullivan Racing entry did not set a time after Aaron Telitz hit the wall at turn 2 in the first session.

The final session of qualifying was for cars in the DPi class. Kevin Magnussen qualified on pole driving the No. 01 car for Cadillac Chip Ganassi Racing, beating Harry Tincknell in the No. 55 Mazda Motorsports entry by 0.021 seconds. The session was shortened after Tristan Vautier, driving the No. 5 JDC-Mustang Sampling Racing Cadillac, crashed at turn 4. For causing a red flag, Vauiter had his best two laps from the session deleted.

=== Qualifying results ===
Pole positions in each class are indicated in bold and by ‡.

| Pos. | Class | No. | Team | Driver | Time | Gap | Grid |
|---|---|---|---|---|---|---|---|
| 1 | **DPi** | **01** | **(United States) Cadillac Chip Ganassi Racing** | **(Denmark) Kevin Magnussen** | **1:20.031** | **_** | 1‡ |
| 2 | DPi | 55 | (Japan) Mazda Motorsports | (United Kingdom) Harry Tincknell | 1:20.052 | +0.021 | 2 |
| 3 | DPi | 31 | (United States) Whelen Engineering Racing | (Brazil) Pipo Derani | 1:20.161 | +0.130 | 3 |
| 4 | DPi | 10 | (United States) WTR-Konica Minolta Acura | (United States) Ricky Taylor | 1:20.299 | +0.268 | 4 |
| 5 | DPi | 5 | (United States) JDC-Mustang Sampling Racing | (France) Tristan Vautier | 1:20.532^{1} | +0.501 | 5 |
| 6 | DPi | 60 | (United States) Meyer Shank Racing with Curb-Agajanian | (France) Olivier Pla | 1:21.455 | +1.424 | 6 |
| 7 | **GTLM** | **4** | **(United States) Corvette Racing** | **(United Kingdom) Nick Tandy** | **1:27.283** | **+7.231** | 7‡ |
| 8 | GTLM | 3 | (United States) Corvette Racing | (United States) Jordan Taylor | 1:27.606 | +7.554 | 8 |
| 9 | **GTD** | **39** | **(United States) CarBahn Motorsports with Peregrine Racing** | **(United States) Richard Heistand** | **1:30.529** | **+10.498** | 9‡ |
| 10 | GTD | 12 | (United States) Vasser Sullivan Racing | (United States) Frankie Montecalvo | 1:30.617 | +10.586 | 10 |
| 11 | GTD | 23 | (United States) Heart Of Racing Team | (Canada) Roman De Angelis | 1:30.671 | +10.640 | 11 |
| 12 | GTD | 96 | (United States) Turner Motorsport | (United States) Robby Foley | 1:30.861 | +10.830 | 12 |
| 13 | GTD | 14 | (United States) Vasser Sullivan Racing | (United States) Aaron Telitz | 1:30.865 | +10.834 | 19^{2} |
| 14 | GTD | 1 | (United States) Paul Miller Racing | (United States) Madison Snow | 1:30.879 | +10.848 | 13 |
| 15 | GTD | 76 | (United States) Compass Racing | (Canada) Jeff Kingsley | 1:30.977 | +10.946 | 14 |
| 16 | GTD | 66 | (United States) Gradient Racing | (United Kingdom) Till Bechtolsheimer | 1:31.582 | +11.551 | 15 |
| 17 | GTD | 28 | (United States) Alegra Motorsports | (United States) Michael de Quesada | 1:31.660 | +11.629 | 16 |
| 18 | GTD | 75 | (Australia) SunEnergy1 Racing | (Australia) Kenny Habul | 1:31.784 | +11.753 | 17 |
| 19 | GTD | 88 | (United States) Team Hardpoint EBM | (United States) Rob Ferriol | 1:31.841 | +11.810 | 20^{3} |
| 20 | GTD | 19 | (Austria) GRT Grasser Racing Team | (Canada) Misha Goikhberg | 1:32.211 | +12.180 | 18 |
Sources:

- ^{1} The No. 5 JDC-Mustang Sampling Racing entry had its two fastest laps deleted as penalty for causing a red flag during its qualifying session.
- ^{2} The No. 14 Vasser Sullivan Racing entry initially qualified fifth in the GTD class. However, the car did not participate in the second GTD qualifying session. By IMSA rules, the entry was moved to the rear of the GTD field on the starting grid.
- ^{3} The No. 88 Team Hardpoint EBM entry was moved to the back of the GTD field as per Article 40.1.4 of the Sporting regulations (Change of starting tires).

== Post-race ==
As a result of winning the race, van der Zande and Magnussen advanced from sixth to fourth in the DPi Drivers' Championship. Derani and Nasr jumped from fourth to third while Duval and Vautier dropped from third to fifth. GTLM drivers, teams, and manufactures did not score full season points due to the event not counting for the overall championship. GTD drivers, teams, and manufactures did not score full season points due to the event only counting towards the WeatherTech Sprint Cup. Cadillac took the lead of the DPi Manufactures' Championship while WTR-Konica Minolta Acura continued to top the DPi Teams' Championship with eight rounds remaining.

=== Race results ===
Class winners are denoted in bold and ‡.

| Pos | Class | No. | Team | Drivers | Chassis | Laps | Time/Retired |
| Pos | Class | No. | Team | Drivers | Engine | Laps | Time/Retired |
|---|---|---|---|---|---|---|---|
| 1 | **DPi** | **01** | **(United States) Cadillac Chip Ganassi Racing** | **(Netherlands) Renger van der Zande (Denmark) Kevin Magnussen** | **Cadillac DPi-V.R** | **66** | **1:40:03.247‡** |
| 1 | **DPi** | **01** | **(United States) Cadillac Chip Ganassi Racing** | **(Netherlands) Renger van der Zande (Denmark) Kevin Magnussen** | **Cadillac 5.5L V8** | **66** | **1:40:03.247‡** |
| 2 | DPi | 31 | (United States) Whelen Engineering Racing | (Brazil) Felipe Nasr (Brazil) Pipo Derani | Cadillac DPi-V.R | 66 | +0.573 |
| 2 | DPi | 31 | (United States) Whelen Engineering Racing | (Brazil) Felipe Nasr (Brazil) Pipo Derani | Cadillac 5.5L V8 | 66 | +0.573 |
| 3 | DPi | 10 | (United States) Konica Minolta Acura | (United States) Ricky Taylor (Portugal) Filipe Albuquerque | Acura ARX-05 | 66 | +4.028 |
| 3 | DPi | 10 | (United States) Konica Minolta Acura | (United States) Ricky Taylor (Portugal) Filipe Albuquerque | Acura AR35TT 3.5L Turbo V6 | 66 | +4.028 |
| 4 | DPi | 55 | (Canada) Mazda Motorsports | (United Kingdom) Oliver Jarvis (United Kingdom) Harry Tincknell | Mazda RT24-P | 66 | +4.876 |
| 4 | DPi | 55 | (Canada) Mazda Motorsports | (United Kingdom) Oliver Jarvis (United Kingdom) Harry Tincknell | Mazda MZ-2.0T 2.0L Turbo I4 | 66 | +4.876 |
| 5 | DPi | 5 | (United States) JDC-Mustang Sampling Racing | (France) Tristan Vautier (France) Loïc Duval | Cadillac DPi-V.R | 66 | +5.182 |
| 5 | DPi | 5 | (United States) JDC-Mustang Sampling Racing | (France) Tristan Vautier (France) Loïc Duval | Cadillac 5.5L V8 | 66 | +5.182 |
| 6 | DPi | 60 | (United States) Meyer Shank Racing with Curb-Agajanian | (United States) Dane Cameron (France) Olivier Pla | Acura ARX-05 | 66 | +5.425 |
| 6 | DPi | 60 | (United States) Meyer Shank Racing with Curb-Agajanian | (United States) Dane Cameron (France) Olivier Pla | Acura AR35TT 3.5L Turbo V6 | 66 | +5.425 |
| 7 | **GTLM** | **4** | **(United States) Corvette Racing** | **(United States) Tommy Milner (United Kingdom) Nick Tandy** | **Chevrolet Corvette C8.R** | **63** | **+3 Laps‡** |
| 7 | **GTLM** | **4** | **(United States) Corvette Racing** | **(United States) Tommy Milner (United Kingdom) Nick Tandy** | **Chevrolet 5.5L V8** | **63** | **+3 Laps‡** |
| 8 | GTLM | 3 | (United States) Corvette Racing | (Spain) Antonio García (United States) Jordan Taylor | Chevrolet Corvette C8.R | 63 | +3 Laps |
| 8 | GTLM | 3 | (United States) Corvette Racing | (Spain) Antonio García (United States) Jordan Taylor | Chevrolet 5.5L V8 | 63 | +3 Laps |
| 9 | **GTD** | **23** | **(United States) Heart of Racing Team** | **(Canada) Roman De Angelis (United Kingdom) Ross Gunn** | **Aston Martin Vantage AMR GT3** | **62** | **+4 Laps‡** |
| 9 | **GTD** | **23** | **(United States) Heart of Racing Team** | **(Canada) Roman De Angelis (United Kingdom) Ross Gunn** | **Mercedes-Benz M177 4.0L Turbo V8** | **62** | **+4 Laps‡** |
| 10 | GTD | 19 | (Austria) GRT Grasser Racing Team | (Canada) Misha Goikhberg (Italy) Marco Mapelli | Lamborghini Huracán GT3 Evo | 62 | +4 Laps |
| 10 | GTD | 19 | (Austria) GRT Grasser Racing Team | (Canada) Misha Goikhberg (Italy) Marco Mapelli | Lamborghini 5.2L V10 | 62 | +4 Laps |
| 11 | GTD | 66 | (United States) Gradient Racing | (United Kingdom) Till Bechtolsheimer (United States) Marc Miller | Acura NSX GT3 Evo | 62 | +4 Laps |
| 11 | GTD | 66 | (United States) Gradient Racing | (United Kingdom) Till Bechtolsheimer (United States) Marc Miller | Acura 3.5L Turbo V6 | 62 | +4 Laps |
| 12 | GTD | 14 | (United States) Vasser Sullivan Racing | (United States) Aaron Telitz (United Kingdom) Jack Hawksworth | Lexus RC F GT3 | 62 | +4 Laps |
| 12 | GTD | 14 | (United States) Vasser Sullivan Racing | (United States) Aaron Telitz (United Kingdom) Jack Hawksworth | Lexus 5.0L V8 | 62 | +4 Laps |
| 13 | GTD | 12 | (United States) Vasser Sullivan Racing | (United States) Frankie Montecalvo (United States) Townsend Bell | Lexus RC F GT3 | 62 | +4 Laps |
| 13 | GTD | 12 | (United States) Vasser Sullivan Racing | (United States) Frankie Montecalvo (United States) Townsend Bell | Lexus 5.0L V8 | 62 | +4 Laps |
| 14 | GTD | 1 | (United States) Paul Miller Racing | (United States) Bryan Sellers (United States) Madison Snow | Lamborghini Huracán GT3 Evo | 62 | +4 Laps |
| 14 | GTD | 1 | (United States) Paul Miller Racing | (United States) Bryan Sellers (United States) Madison Snow | Lamborghini 5.2L V10 | 62 | +4 Laps |
| 15 | GTD | 75 | (Australia) SunEnergy1 Racing | (Australia) Kenny Habul (Canada) Mikaël Grenier | Mercedes-AMG GT3 Evo | 62 | +4 Laps |
| 15 | GTD | 75 | (Australia) SunEnergy1 Racing | (Australia) Kenny Habul (Canada) Mikaël Grenier | Mercedes-AMG M159 6.2L V8 | 62 | +4 Laps |
| 16 | GTD | 96 | (United States) Turner Motorsport | (United States) Bill Auberlen (United States) Robby Foley | BMW M6 GT3 | 55 | Transmission |
| 16 | GTD | 96 | (United States) Turner Motorsport | (United States) Bill Auberlen (United States) Robby Foley | BMW 4.4L Turbo V8 | 55 | Transmission |
| 17 DNF | GTD | 76 | (United States) Compass Racing | (Canada) Jeff Kingsley (Germany) Mario Farnbacher | Acura NSX GT3 Evo | 50 | Brakes |
| 17 DNF | GTD | 76 | (United States) Compass Racing | (Canada) Jeff Kingsley (Germany) Mario Farnbacher | Acura 3.5L Turbo V6 | 50 | Brakes |
| 18 DNF | GTD | 28 | (United States) Alegra Motorsports | (Canada) Daniel Morad (United States) Michael de Quesada | Mercedes-AMG GT3 Evo | 28 | Crash damage |
| 18 DNF | GTD | 28 | (United States) Alegra Motorsports | (Canada) Daniel Morad (United States) Michael de Quesada | Mercedes-AMG M159 6.2L V8 | 28 | Crash damage |
| 19 DNF | GTD | 88 | (United States) Team Hardpoint EBM | (United States) Rob Ferriol (United Kingdom) Katherine Legge | Porsche 911 GT3 R | 3 | Accident |
| 19 DNF | GTD | 88 | (United States) Team Hardpoint EBM | (United States) Rob Ferriol (United Kingdom) Katherine Legge | Porsche 4.0L Flat-6 | 3 | Accident |
| 20 (Note: The no. 39 CarBahn with Peregrine Racing entry was moved to the rear of the GTD classification for failing to meet the minimum refueling time of 40 seconds.) | GTD | 39 | (United States) CarBahn with Peregrine Racing | (United States) Richard Heistand (United States) Jeff Westphal | Audi R8 LMS Evo | 62 | +4 Laps |
| 20 | GTD | 39 | (United States) CarBahn with Peregrine Racing | (United States) Richard Heistand (United States) Jeff Westphal | Audi 5.2L V10 | 62 | +4 Laps |

== Standings after the race ==
DPi Drivers' Championship standings
| Pos. | +/– | Driver | Points |
|---|---|---|---|
| 1 | | (Portugal) Filipe Albuquerque (United States) Ricky Taylor | 1398 |
| 2 | | (United Kingdom) Oliver Jarvis (United Kingdom) Harry Tincknell | 1327 |
| 3 | 1 | (Brazil) Pipo Derani (Brazil) Felipe Nasr | 1270 |
| 4 | 2 | (Denmark) Kevin Magnussen (Netherlands) Renger van der Zande | 1219 |
| 5 | 2 | (France) Loïc Duval (France) Tristan Vautier | 1211 |

LMP2 Drivers' Championship standings
| Pos. | +/– | Driver | Points |
|---|---|---|---|
| 1 | | (United States) Scott Huffaker (Denmark) Mikkel Jensen (United States) Ben Keating | 382 |
| 2 | | (United Kingdom) Ryan Dalziel (United States) Dwight Merriman (United Kingdom) Kyle Tilley | 350 |
| 3 | | (France) Gabriel Aubry (France) Timothé Buret (Canada) John Farano | 326 |
| 4 | | (United States) Thomas Merrill (United States) Tristan Nunez (United States) Steven Thomas | 315 |
| 5 | | (United Kingdom) Wayne Boyd (United States) James McGuire (United Kingdom) Guy Smith | 388 |

LMP3 Drivers' Championship standings
| Pos. | +/– | Driver | Points |
|---|---|---|---|
| 1 | | (United States) Gar Robinson | 715 |
| 2 | | (United States) Jon Bennett (United States) Colin Braun | 690 |
| 3 | | (United States) Jim Cox (United States) Dylan Murry | 646 |
| 4 | | (Sweden) Rasmus Lindh (United States) Dan Goldburg | 620 |
| 5 | | (United States) Oliver Askew | 592 |

GTLM Drivers' Championship standings
| Pos. | +/– | Driver | Points |
|---|---|---|---|
| 1 | | (Netherlands) Nicky Catsburg (Spain) Antonio García (United States) Jordan Taylor | 697‡ |
| 2 | | (United States) Cooper MacNeil | 656‡ |
| 3 | | (United States) John Edwards (Brazil) Augusto Farfus (Finland) Jesse Krohn | 653‡ |
| 4 | | (United States) Tommy Milner (United Kingdom) Alexander Sims (United Kingdom) Nick Tandy | 647‡ |
| 5 | | (United States) Connor De Phillippi (Austria) Philipp Eng (Canada) Bruno Spengler | 636‡ |

GTD Drivers' Championship standings
| Pos. | +/– | Driver | Points |
|---|---|---|---|
| 1 | | (United States) Bill Auberlen (United States) Robby Foley | 920‡ |
| 2 | | (Canada) Roman De Angelis (United Kingdom) Ross Gunn | 913‡ |
| 3 | | (United States) Patrick Long | 874‡ |
| 4 | | (Canada) Zacharie Robichon (Belgium) Laurens Vanthoor | 872‡ |
| 5 | | (United States) Madison Snow (United States) Bryan Sellers | 854‡ |

- Note: Only the top five positions are included for all sets of standings.
- ‡: Non-points event
- ‡: Points count towards WeatherTech Sprint Cup championship only.

DPi Teams' Championship standings
| Pos. | +/– | Team | Points |
|---|---|---|---|
| 1 | | (United States) #10 WTR-Konica Minolta Acura | 1070 |
| 2 | | (Canada) #55 Mazda Motorsports | 1015 |
| 3 | 1 | (United States) #31 Whelen Engineering Racing | 925 |
| 4 | 2 | (United States) #01 Cadillac Chip Ganassi Racing | 920 |
| 5 | 2 | (United States) #5 JDC-Mustang Sampling Racing | 920 |

LMP2 Teams' Championship standings
| Pos. | +/– | Team | Points |
|---|---|---|---|
| 1 | | (United States) #52 PR1 Mathiasen Motorsports | 382 |
| 2 | | (United States) #18 Era Motorsport | 350 |
| 3 | | (United States) #8 Tower Motorsport | 326 |
| 4 | | (United States) #11 WIN Autosport | 315 |
| 5 | | (United States) #22 United Autosports | 288 |

LMP3 Teams' Championship standings
| Pos. | +/– | Team | Points |
|---|---|---|---|
| 1 | | (United States) #74 Riley Motorsports | 715 |
| 2 | | (United States) #54 CORE Autosport | 690 |
| 3 | | (United States) #91 Riley Motorsports | 646 |
| 4 | | (United States) #38 Performance Tech Motorsports | 620 |
| 5 | | (United States) #33 Sean Creech Motorsport | 571 |

GTLM Teams' Championship standings
| Pos. | +/– | Team | Points |
|---|---|---|---|
| 1 | | (United States) #3 Corvette Racing | 697‡ |
| 2 | | (United States) #79 WeatherTech Racing | 656‡ |
| 3 | | (United States) #24 BMW Team RLL | 653‡ |
| 4 | | (United States) #4 Corvette Racing | 647‡ |
| 5 | | (United States) #25 BMW Team RLL | 636‡ |

GTD Teams' Championship standings
| Pos. | +/– | Team | Points |
|---|---|---|---|
| 1 | | (United States) #96 Turner Motorsport | 920‡ |
| 2 | | (United States) #23 Heart of Racing Team | 913‡ |
| 3 | | (United States) #16 Wright Motorsports | 874‡ |
| 4 | | (Canada) #9 Pfaff Motorsports | 872‡ |
| 5 | | (United States) #1 Paul Miller Racing | 854‡ |

- Note: Only the top five positions are included for all sets of standings.
- ‡: Non-points event
- ‡: Points count towards WeatherTech Sprint Cup championship only.

DPi Manufacturers' Championship standings
| Pos. | +/– | Manufacturer | Points |
|---|---|---|---|
| 1 | 1 | (United States) Cadillac | 1475 |
| 2 | 1 | (Japan) Acura | 1444 |
| 3 | | (Japan) Mazda | 1349 |

GTLM Manufacturers' Championship standings
| Pos. | +/– | Manufacturer | Points |
|---|---|---|---|
| 1 | | (United States) Chevrolet | 720‡ |
| 2 | | (Germany) BMW | 700‡ |
| 3 | | (Germany) Porsche | 692‡ |
| 4 | | (Italy) Ferrari | 330‡ |

GTD Manufacturers' Championship standings
| Pos. | +/– | Manufacturer | Points |
|---|---|---|---|
| 1 | | (Germany) Porsche | 999‡ |
| 2 | | (Germany) BMW | 963‡ |
| 3 | | (United Kingdom) Aston Martin | 957‡ |
| 4 | | (Italy) Lamborghini | 938‡ |
| 5 | | (Japan) Lexus | 925‡ |

- Note: Only the top five positions are included for all sets of standings.
- ‡: Non-points event
- ‡: Points count towards WeatherTech Sprint Cup championship only.

IMSA SportsCar Championship
| Previous race: 2021 Sports Car Challenge at Mid-Ohio | 2021 season | Next race: 2021 6 Hours of The Glen |
