= 2021 Sports Car Challenge at Mid-Ohio =

Third round of the 2021 IMSA SportsCar Championship season

The layout of Mid-Ohio Sports Car Course

The 2021 SportsCar Challenge at Mid-Ohio, known for sponsorship reasons as the 2021 Acura SportsCar Challenge, was a sports car race held at Mid-Ohio Sports Car Course near Lexington, Ohio on May 16, 2021. The race is the third round of the 2021 IMSA SportsCar Championship, and the first round of the 2021 WeatherTech GT Daytona Sprint Cup.

== Background ==
This race was initially meant to be the fifth round of the 2021 IMSA Championship, until the two "West Coast Swing" rounds, located at WeatherTech Raceway Laguna Seca and Long Beach street circuit, both in California, were postponed to September due to the ongoing COVID-19 pandemic in California.

On May 5, 2021, the entry list for the event was released, featuring a total of 26 cars across three classes. Six cars were in Daytona Prototype International (DPi), another six entries were in the Le Mans Prototype 3 (LMP3) class, and 14 entries were received for the GT Daytona (GTD) class. The GT Le Mans (GTLM) and Le Mans Prototype 2 (LMP2) classes were not present. In the GTD class, several teams who were scheduled to be present only at the 3-hour rounds on the 2021 calendar made their season debut, including CarBahn Motorsports and Compass Racing, the former of which was making the step up from the IMSA SportsCar Championship support category, the Michelin Pilot Challenge.

This race also marked the start of the season for full-time Wright Motorsports driver, Ryan Hardwick, after suffering crashes that put him out of both the 24 Hours of Daytona and the 12 Hours of Sebring due to concussion. In those two races without Hardwick, Wright Motorsports built up a points lead in the GTD class.

In the LMP3 class, despite the absence of Forty7 motorsports, IndyCar team Andretti Autosport made their season debut with a Ligier JS P320 piloted by Jarett Andretti and Oliver Askew.

On May 5, 2021, IMSA released a technical bulletin regarding the Balance of Performance constraints for the Mid-Ohio race. The Mazda RT24-P was given a slight power boost, with the equivalent of a 7.5 horsepower increase in engine output through turbo boost levels. After winning at Daytona and Sebring, the Acura ARX-05 and Cadillac DPi-V.R respectively were each given a 1.0 liter reduction in fuel capacity.

In the GTD class, after finishing in the top two places at the 12 Hours of Sebring, the Porsche 911 GT3 R was made 20 kilograms heavier, bringing the standard weight to 1,320 kilograms. A similar change was made to the Acura NSX GT3 Evo, with a 10 kilogram weight reduction after best finishes of 11th and 4th at Daytona and Sebring respectively.

Forty7 Motorsports and Grasser Racing Team withdrew from the event prior to the first practice session.

== Practice ==
There were two practice sessions preceding the start of the race on Sunday, one on Friday and one on Saturday. The first session on Friday afternoon lasted one hour while the second session on Saturday morning lasted 75 minutes.

=== Practice 1 ===
The first practice session took place at 4:30 pm ET on Friday and ended with Pipo Derani topping the charts for Whelen Engineering Racing, with a lap time of 1:11.846, ahead of the No. 10 Acura of Ricky Taylor. Colin Braun set the fastest time in LMP3 with a lap time of 1:17.240. Jack Hawksworth was fastest in GTD with a time of 1:20.513, 0.291 seconds faster than Bill Auberlen's No. 96 BMW. The session was red flagged early for ten minutes after Jarett Andretti stopped on track.

Pos.	Class	No.	Team	Driver	Time	Gap
1	DPi	31	Whelen Engineering Racing	Pipo Derani	1:11.846	_
2	DPi	10	WTR-Konica Minolta Acura	Ricky Taylor	1:12.221	+0.375
3	DPi	60	Meyer Shank Racing with Curb-Agajanian	Dane Cameron	1:12.501	+0.655

=== Practice 2 ===
The second and final practice session took place at 8:50 am ET on Saturday and ended with Dane Cameron topping the charts for Meyer Shank Racing with Curb-Agajanian, with a lap time of 1:10.766. Pipo Derani was second fastest in the No. 31 Cadillac followed by Filipe Albuquerque in the No. 10 Acura. The No. 91 Riley Motorsports Ligier of Dylan Murry was fastest in LMP3 with a time of 1:16.606. The GTD class was topped by the No. 14 Vasser Sullivan Racing Lexus RC F GT3 of Aaron Telitz.

Pos.	Class	No.	Team	Driver	Time	Gap
1	DPi	60	Meyer Shank Racing with Curb-Agajanian	Dane Cameron	1:10.766	_
2	DPi	31	Whelen Engineering Racing	Pipo Derani	1:10.995	+0.229
3	DPi	10	WTR-Konica Minolta Acura	Filipe Albuquerque	1:11.034	+0.268

== Qualifying ==
Qualifying was broken into four sessions. The first was for cars in the GTD class. Aaron Telitz qualified on pole for the class driving the No. 14 car for Vasser Sullivan Racing, beating Robby Foley in the No. 96 Turner Motorsport entry by 0.006 seconds. Daniel Morad in the No. 28 Mercedes was third followed by Frankie Montecalvo in the No. 12 Lexus.

The second session was the points paying session for the GTD class. Patrick Long set the fastest time and earned 35 championship points. Long was 0.126 seconds clear of Zach Veach in the No. 12 Lexus followed by Laurens Vanthoor in the No. 9 Pfaff Motorsports Porsche.

The third session was for cars in the LMP3 class. Gar Robinson qualified on pole driving the No. 74 car for Riley Motorsports. Robinson was more than three-tenths clear of Jon Bennett in the No. 54 CORE Autosport car followed by Jarett Andretti in the No. 36 Andretti Autosport entry.

The final session of qualifying was for the DPi class. Harry Tincknell qualified on pole driving the No. 55 car for Mazda Motorsports, beating Filipe Albuquerque in the No. 10 WTR-Konica Minolta Acura entry by 0.095 seconds.

=== Qualifying results ===
Pole positions in each class are indicated in bold and by ‡.

Pos.	Class	No.	Team	Driver	Time	Gap	Grid
1	**DPi**	**55**	**(Japan) Mazda Motorsports**	**(United Kingdom) Harry Tincknell**	**1:10.027**	**_**	1‡
2	DPi	10	(United States) WTR-Konica Minolta Acura	(Portugal) Filipe Albuquerque	1:10.122	+0.095	2
3	DPi	60	(United States) Meyer Shank Racing with Curb-Agajanian	(United States) Dane Cameron	1:10.355	+0.328	6^{1}
4	DPi	31	(United States) Whelen Engineering Racing	(Brazil) Pipo Derani	1:10.432	+0.405	3
5	DPi	5	(United States) JDC-Mustang Sampling Racing	(France) Tristan Vautier	1:10.567	+0.540	5^{2}
6	DPi	01	(United States) Cadillac Chip Ganassi Racing	(Denmark) Kevin Magnussen	1:10.934	+0.907	4^{3}
7	**LMP3**	**74**	**(United States) Riley Motorsports**	**(United States) Gar Robinson**	**1:17.246**	**+7.219**	7‡
8	LMP3	54	(United States) CORE Autosport	(United States) Jon Bennett	1:17.632	+7.605	8
9	LMP3	36	(United States) Andretti Autosport	(United States) Jarett Andretti	1:17.713	+7.686	9
10	LMP3	38	(United States) Performance Tech Motorsports	(United States) Dan Goldburg	1:19.347	+9.320	10^{4}
11	LMP3	91	(United States) Riley Motorsports	(United States) Jim Cox	1:19.444	+9.417	11^{5}
12	LMP3	33	(United States) Sean Creech Motorsport	(United States) Lance Willsey	1:19.629	+9.602	12
13	**GTD**	**14**	**(United States) Vasser Sullivan Racing**	**(United States) Aaron Telitz**	**1:20.529**	**+10.502**	13‡
14	GTD	96	(United States) Turner Motorsport	(United States) Robby Foley	1:20.535	+10.508	14
15	GTD	28	(United States) Alegra Motorsports	(Canada) Daniel Morad	1:20.687	+10.660	15
16	GTD	12	(United States) Vasser Sullivan Racing	(United States) Frankie Montecalvo	1:20.812	+10.785	16
17	GTD	1	(United States) Paul Miller Racing	(United States) Madison Snow	1:20.941	+10.914	17
18	GTD	9	(Canada) Pfaff Motorsports	(Canada) Zacharie Robichon	1:20.952	+10.925	25^{6}
19	GTD	23	(United States) Heart Of Racing Team	(Canada) Roman De Angelis	1:21.139	+11.112	18
20	GTD	76	(United States) Compass Racing	(Canada) Jeff Kingsley	1:21.332	+11.305	19
21	GTD	39	(United States) CarBahn Motorsports with Peregrine Racing	(United States) Richard Heistand	1:21.478	+11.451	20
22	GTD	66	(United States) Gradient Racing	(United Kingdom) Till Bechtolsheimer	1:21.856	+11.829	21
23	GTD	16	(United States) Wright Motorsports	(United States) Trent Hindman	1:21.975	+11.948	22
24	GTD	88	(United States) Team Hardpoint EBM	(United States) Rob Ferriol	1:22.036	+12.009	23
25	GTD	44	(United States) Magnus Racing with Archangel Motorsports	(United States) John Potter	1:22.131	+12.104	24^{7}
Sources:

- ^{1} The No. 60 Meyer Shank Racing with Curb-Agajanian entry initially qualified third for the DPi class. However, the team changed engines. By IMSA rules, the entry was moved to the rear of the DPi field on the starting grid. Additionally, the team elected to change tires after qualifying.
- ^{2} The No. 5 JDC-Mustang Sampling Racing entry was moved to the back of the DPi field as per Article 40.1.4 of the Sporting regulations (Change of starting tires).
- ^{3} The No. 01 Cadillac Chip Ganassi Racing entry was moved to the back of the DPi field as per Article 40.1.4 of the Sporting regulations (Change of starting tires).
- ^{4} The No. 38 Performance Tech Motorsports entry initially qualified fourth for the LMP3 class. However, the car suffered an engine failure during qualifying, forcing the team to use its IMSA Prototype Challenge chassis due to a lack of spare engines. By IMSA rules, the entry was moved to the rear of the LMP3 field on the starting grid.
- ^{5} The No. 91 Riley Motorsports entry was moved to the back of the LMP3 field as per Article 40.1.4 of the Sporting regulations (Change of starting tires).
- ^{6} The No. 9 Pfaff Motorsports entry was moved to the rear of the GTD classification for violating competition rules regarding the car's ride height.
- ^{7} The No. 44 Magnus Racing entry was moved to the back of the GTD field as per Article 40.1.4 of the Sporting regulations (Change of starting tires).

== Race ==
=== Post-race ===
With a total of 1,070 points, Albuquerque and Taylor's victory allowed them to extend their lead in the DPi Drivers' Championship over Jarvis and Tincknell to 55 points. Derani and Nasr advanced from seventh to fourth while Cameron and Pla dropped from fourth to fifth. As a result of winning the race, Robinson took the lead of the LMP3 Drivers' Championship. Lindh and Goldburg advanced from tenth to fourth while Askew jumped from seventh to fifth. With 920 points, Auberlen and Foley's allowed them to take the lead of the GTD Drivers' Championship. Sellers and Snow advanced from seventh to fifth while Long dropped from first to third. Porsche continued to top their respective Manufactures' Championship while Acura took the lead of the DPi Manufactures' Championship. WTR-Konica Minolta Acura kept their advantage in the DPi Teams' Championship while Riley Motorsports and Turner Motorsport became the leaders of their respective class Teams' Championships with nine races left in the season.

== Race results ==
Class winners are denoted in bold and ‡.

Pos	Class	No.	Team	Drivers	Chassis	Laps	Time/Retired
Pos	Class	No.	Team	Drivers	Engine	Laps	Time/Retired
1	**DPi**	**10**	**(United States) Konica Minolta Acura ARX-05**	**(Portugal) Filipe Albuquerque (United States) Ricky Taylor**	**Acura ARX-05**	**122**	**2:40:21.370‡**
1	**DPi**	**10**	**(United States) Konica Minolta Acura ARX-05**	**(Portugal) Filipe Albuquerque (United States) Ricky Taylor**	**Acura AR35TT 3.5L Turbo V6**	**122**	**2:40:21.370‡**
2	DPi	31	(United States) Whelen Engineering Racing	(Brazil) Felipe Nasr (Brazil) Pipo Derani	Cadillac DPi-V.R	122	+0.368
2	DPi	31	(United States) Whelen Engineering Racing	(Brazil) Felipe Nasr (Brazil) Pipo Derani	Cadillac 5.5L V8	122	+0.368
3	DPi	55	(Canada) Mazda Motorsports	(United Kingdom) Oliver Jarvis (United Kingdom) Harry Tincknell	Mazda RT24-P	122	+12.925
3	DPi	55	(Canada) Mazda Motorsports	(United Kingdom) Oliver Jarvis (United Kingdom) Harry Tincknell	Mazda MZ-2.0T 2.0L Turbo I4	122	+12.925
4	DPi	5	(United States) JDC-Mustang Sampling Racing	(France) Tristan Vautier (France) Loïc Duval	Cadillac DPi-V.R	122	+26.719
4	DPi	5	(United States) JDC-Mustang Sampling Racing	(France) Tristan Vautier (France) Loïc Duval	Cadillac 5.5L V8	122	+26.719
5	DPi	01	(United States) Cadillac Chip Ganassi Racing	(Netherlands) Renger van der Zande (Denmark) Kevin Magnussen	Cadillac DPi-V.R	122	+33.115
5	DPi	01	(United States) Cadillac Chip Ganassi Racing	(Netherlands) Renger van der Zande (Denmark) Kevin Magnussen	Cadillac 5.5L V8	122	+33.115
6	DPi	60	(United States) Meyer Shank Racing with Curb-Agajanian	(United States) Dane Cameron (France) Olivier Pla	Acura ARX-05	122	+37.698
6	DPi	60	(United States) Meyer Shank Racing with Curb-Agajanian	(United States) Dane Cameron (France) Olivier Pla	Acura AR35TT 3.5L Turbo V6	122	+37.698
7	**LMP3**	**74**	**(United States) Riley Motorsports**	**(United States) Gar Robinson (Brazil) Felipe Fraga**	**Ligier JS P320**	**115**	**+7 Laps‡**
7	**LMP3**	**74**	**(United States) Riley Motorsports**	**(United States) Gar Robinson (Brazil) Felipe Fraga**	**Nissan VK56DE 5.6L V8**	**115**	**+7 Laps‡**
8	LMP3	38	(United States) Performance Tech Motorsports	(United States) Dan Goldburg (Sweden) Rasmus Lindh	Ligier JS P320	115	+7 Laps
8	LMP3	38	(United States) Performance Tech Motorsports	(United States) Dan Goldburg (Sweden) Rasmus Lindh	Nissan VK56DE 5.6L V8	115	+7 Laps
9	LMP3	91	(United States) Riley Motorsports	(United States) Jim Cox (United States) Dylan Murry	Ligier JS P320	115	+7 Laps
9	LMP3	91	(United States) Riley Motorsports	(United States) Jim Cox (United States) Dylan Murry	Nissan VK56DE 5.6L V8	115	+7 Laps
10	LMP3	54	(United States) CORE Autosport	(United States) Jon Bennett (United States) Colin Braun	Ligier JS P320	115	+7 Laps
10	LMP3	54	(United States) CORE Autosport	(United States) Jon Bennett (United States) Colin Braun	Nissan VK56DE 5.6L V8	115	+7 Laps
11	LMP3	33	(United States) Sean Creech Motorsport	(Portugal) João Barbosa (United States) Lance Willsey	Ligier JS P320	114	+8 Laps
11	LMP3	33	(United States) Sean Creech Motorsport	(Portugal) João Barbosa (United States) Lance Willsey	Nissan VK56DE 5.6L V8	114	+8 Laps
12	**GTD**	**96**	(United States) **Turner Motorsport**	**(United States) Bill Auberlen** **(United States) Robby Foley**	**BMW M6 GT3**	**111**	**+11 Laps**‡
12	**GTD**	**96**	(United States) **Turner Motorsport**	**(United States) Bill Auberlen** **(United States) Robby Foley**	**BMW** **4.4L Turbo V8**	**111**	**+11 Laps**‡
13	GTD	12	(United States) Vasser-Sullivan Racing	(United States) Frankie Montecalvo (United States) Zach Veach	Lexus RC F GT3	111	+11 Laps
13	GTD	12	(United States) Vasser-Sullivan Racing	(United States) Frankie Montecalvo (United States) Zach Veach	Lexus 5.0L V8	111	+11 Laps
14	GTD	1	(United States) Paul Miller Racing	(United States) Bryan Sellers (United States) Madison Snow	Lamborghini Huracán GT3 Evo	111	+11 Laps
14	GTD	1	(United States) Paul Miller Racing	(United States) Bryan Sellers (United States) Madison Snow	Lamborghini 5.2L V10	111	+11 Laps
15	GTD	23	(United States) Heart of Racing Team	(Canada) Roman De Angelis (United Kingdom) Ross Gunn	Aston Martin Vantage GT3	111	+11 Laps
15	GTD	23	(United States) Heart of Racing Team	(Canada) Roman De Angelis (United Kingdom) Ross Gunn	Mercedes-Benz M177 4.0 L Turbo V8	111	+11 Laps
16	GTD	76	(United States) Compass Racing	(Canada) Jeff Kingsley (Germany) Mario Farnbacher	Acura NSX GT3 Evo	111	+11 Laps
16	GTD	76	(United States) Compass Racing	(Canada) Jeff Kingsley (Germany) Mario Farnbacher	Acura 3.5L Turbo V6	111	+11 Laps
17	GTD	9	(Canada) Pfaff Motorsports	(Canada) Zacharie Robichon (Belgium) Laurens Vanthoor	Porsche 911 GT3 R	111	+11 Laps
17	GTD	9	(Canada) Pfaff Motorsports	(Canada) Zacharie Robichon (Belgium) Laurens Vanthoor	Porsche 4.0L Flat-6	111	+11 Laps
18	GTD	39	(United States) CarBahn Motorsports with Peregrine Racing	(United States) Richard Heistand (United States) Jeff Westphal	Audi R8 LMS Evo	111	+11 Laps
18	GTD	39	(United States) CarBahn Motorsports with Peregrine Racing	(United States) Richard Heistand (United States) Jeff Westphal	Audi 5.2L V10	111	+11 Laps
19	GTD	66	(United States) Gradient Racing	(United Kingdom) Till Bechtolsheimer (United States) Marc Miller	Acura NSX GT3 Evo	111	+11 Laps
19	GTD	66	(United States) Gradient Racing	(United Kingdom) Till Bechtolsheimer (United States) Marc Miller	Acura 3.5L Turbo V6	111	+11 Laps
20	GTD	44	(United States) Magnus Racing with Archangel Motorsports	(United States) John Potter (United States) Andy Lally	Acura NSX GT3 Evo	111	+11 Laps
20	GTD	44	(United States) Magnus Racing with Archangel Motorsports	(United States) John Potter (United States) Andy Lally	Acura 3.5L Turbo V6	111	+11 Laps
21	GTD	28	(United States) Alegra Motorsports	(Canada) Daniel Morad (United States) Michael de Quesada	Mercedes-AMG GT3 Evo	111	+11 Laps
21	GTD	28	(United States) Alegra Motorsports	(Canada) Daniel Morad (United States) Michael de Quesada	Mercedes-AMG M159 6.2L V8	111	+11 Laps
22	GTD	88	(United States) Team Hardpoint EBM	(United States) Rob Ferriol (United Kingdom) Katherine Legge	Porsche 911 GT3 R	110	+12 Laps
22	GTD	88	(United States) Team Hardpoint EBM	(United States) Rob Ferriol (United Kingdom) Katherine Legge	Porsche 4.0L Flat-6	110	+12 Laps
23	GTD	16	(United States) Wright Motorsports	(United States) Trent Hindman (United States) Patrick Long	Porsche 911 GT3 R	107	+15 Laps
23	GTD	16	(United States) Wright Motorsports	(United States) Trent Hindman (United States) Patrick Long	Porsche 4.0L Flat-6	107	+15 Laps
24	LMP3	36	(United States) Andretti Autosport	(United States) Jarett Andretti (United States) Oliver Askew	Ligier JS P320	85	Engine
24	LMP3	36	(United States) Andretti Autosport	(United States) Jarett Andretti (United States) Oliver Askew	Nissan VK56DE 5.6L V8	85	Engine
25	GTD	14	(United States) Vasser-Sullivan Racing	(United Kingdom) Jack Hawksworth (United States) Aaron Telitz	Lexus RC F GT3	77	Suspension
25	GTD	14	(United States) Vasser-Sullivan Racing	(United Kingdom) Jack Hawksworth (United States) Aaron Telitz	Lexus 5.0L V8	77	Suspension

== Standings after the race ==
DPi Drivers' Championship standings
Pos.	+/–	Driver	Points
1		(Portugal) Filipe Albuquerque (United States) Ricky Taylor	1070
2		(United Kingdom) Oliver Jarvis (United Kingdom) Harry Tincknell	1015
3		(France) Loïc Duval (France) Tristan Vautier	925
4	3	(Brazil) Pipo Derani (Brazil) Felipe Nasr	920
5	1	(United States) Dane Cameron (France) Olivier Pla	884

LMP2 Drivers' Championship standings
Pos.	+/–	Driver	Points
1		(United States) Scott Huffaker (Denmark) Mikkel Jensen (United States) Ben Keating	382
2		(United Kingdom) Ryan Dalziel (United States) Dwight Merriman (United Kingdom) Kyle Tilley	350
3		(France) Gabriel Aubry (France) Timothé Buret (Canada) John Farano	326
4		(United States) Thomas Merrill (United States) Tristan Nunez (United States) Steven Thomas	315
5		(United Kingdom) Wayne Boyd (United States) James McGuire (United Kingdom) Guy Smith	388

LMP3 Drivers' Championship standings
Pos.	+/–	Driver	Points
1	4	(United States) Gar Robinson	715
2	1	(United States) Jon Bennett (United States) Colin Braun	690
3		(United States) Jim Cox (United States) Dylan Murry	646
4	6	(Sweden) Rasmus Lindh (United States) Dan Goldburg	620
5	2	(United States) Oliver Askew	592

GTLM Drivers' Championship standings
Pos.	+/–	Driver	Points
1		(Netherlands) Nicky Catsburg (Spain) Antonio García (United States) Jordan Taylor	697
2		(United States) Cooper MacNeil	656
3		(United States) John Edwards (Brazil) Augusto Farfus (Finland) Jesse Krohn	653
4		(United States) Tommy Milner (United Kingdom) Alexander Sims (United Kingdom) Nick Tandy	647
5		(United States) Connor De Phillippi (Austria) Philipp Eng (Canada) Bruno Spengler	636

GTD Drivers' Championship standings
Pos.	+/–	Driver	Points
1	5	(United States) Bill Auberlen (United States) Robby Foley	920
2	1	(Canada) Roman De Angelis (United Kingdom) Ross Gunn	913
3	2	(United States) Patrick Long	874
4		(Canada) Zacharie Robichon (Belgium) Laurens Vanthoor	872
5	2	(United States) Madison Snow (United States) Bryan Sellers	854

- Note: Only the top five positions are included for all sets of standings.

DPi Teams' Championship standings
Pos.	+/–	Team	Points
1		(United States) #10 WTR-Konica Minolta Acura	1070
2		(Canada) #55 Mazda Motorsports	1015
3		(United States) #5 JDC-Mustang Sampling Racing	925
4	3	(United States) #31 Whelen Engineering Racing	920
5	1	(United States) #60 Meyer Shank Racing w/ Curb-Agajanian	920

LMP2 Teams' Championship standings
Pos.	+/–	Team	Points
1		(United States) #52 PR1 Mathiasen Motorsports	382
2		(United States) #18 Era Motorsport	350
3		(United States) #8 Tower Motorsport	326
4		(United States) #11 WIN Autosport	315
5		(United States) #22 United Autosports	288

LMP3 Teams' Championship standings
Pos.	+/–	Team	Points
1	2	(United States) #74 Riley Motorsports	715
2	1	(United States) #54 CORE Autosport	690
3	1	(United States) #91 Riley Motorsports	646
4	2	(United States) #38 Performance Tech Motorsports	620
5		(United States) #33 Sean Creech Motorsport	571

GTLM Teams' Championship standings
Pos.	+/–	Team	Points
1		(United States) #3 Corvette Racing	697
2		(United States) #79 WeatherTech Racing	656
3		(United States) #24 BMW Team RLL	653
4		(United States) #4 Corvette Racing	647
5		(United States) #25 BMW Team RLL	636

GTD Teams' Championship standings
Pos.	+/–	Team	Points
1	4	(United States) #96 Turner Motorsport	920
2		(United States) #23 Heart of Racing Team	913
3	2	(United States) #16 Wright Motorsports	874
4	1	(Canada) #9 Pfaff Motorsports	872
5	1	(United States) #1 Paul Miller Racing	854

- Note: Only the top five positions are included for all sets of standings.

DPi Manufacturers' Championship standings
Pos.	+/–	Manufacturer	Points
1	1	(Japan) Acura	1094
2	1	(United States) Cadillac	1090
3		(Japan) Mazda	1017

GTLM Manufacturers' Championship standings
Pos.	+/–	Manufacturer	Points
1		(United States) Chevrolet	720
2		(Germany) BMW	700
3		(Germany) Porsche	692
4		(Italy) Ferrari	330

GTD Manufacturers' Championship standings
Pos.	+/–	Manufacturer	Points
1		(Germany) Porsche	999
2	4	(Germany) BMW	963
3		(United Kingdom) Aston Martin	957
4		(Italy) Lamborghini	938
5	2	(Japan) Lexus	925

- Note: Only the top five positions are included for all sets of standings.

IMSA SportsCar Championship
Previous race: 2021 12 Hours of Sebring	2021 season	Next race: 2021 Detroit Sports Car Classic
