= 2025 Sahlen's Six Hours of The Glen =

Sixth round of the 2025 IMSA SportsCar Championship season

The layout of Watkins Glen International, where the race was held

The 2025 Sahlen's Six Hours of The Glen was a sports car race held at Watkins Glen International in Dix, New York, on June 22, 2025. It was the sixth round of the 2025 IMSA SportsCar Championship, and the third round of the Michelin Endurance Cup.

== Background ==
=== Preview ===
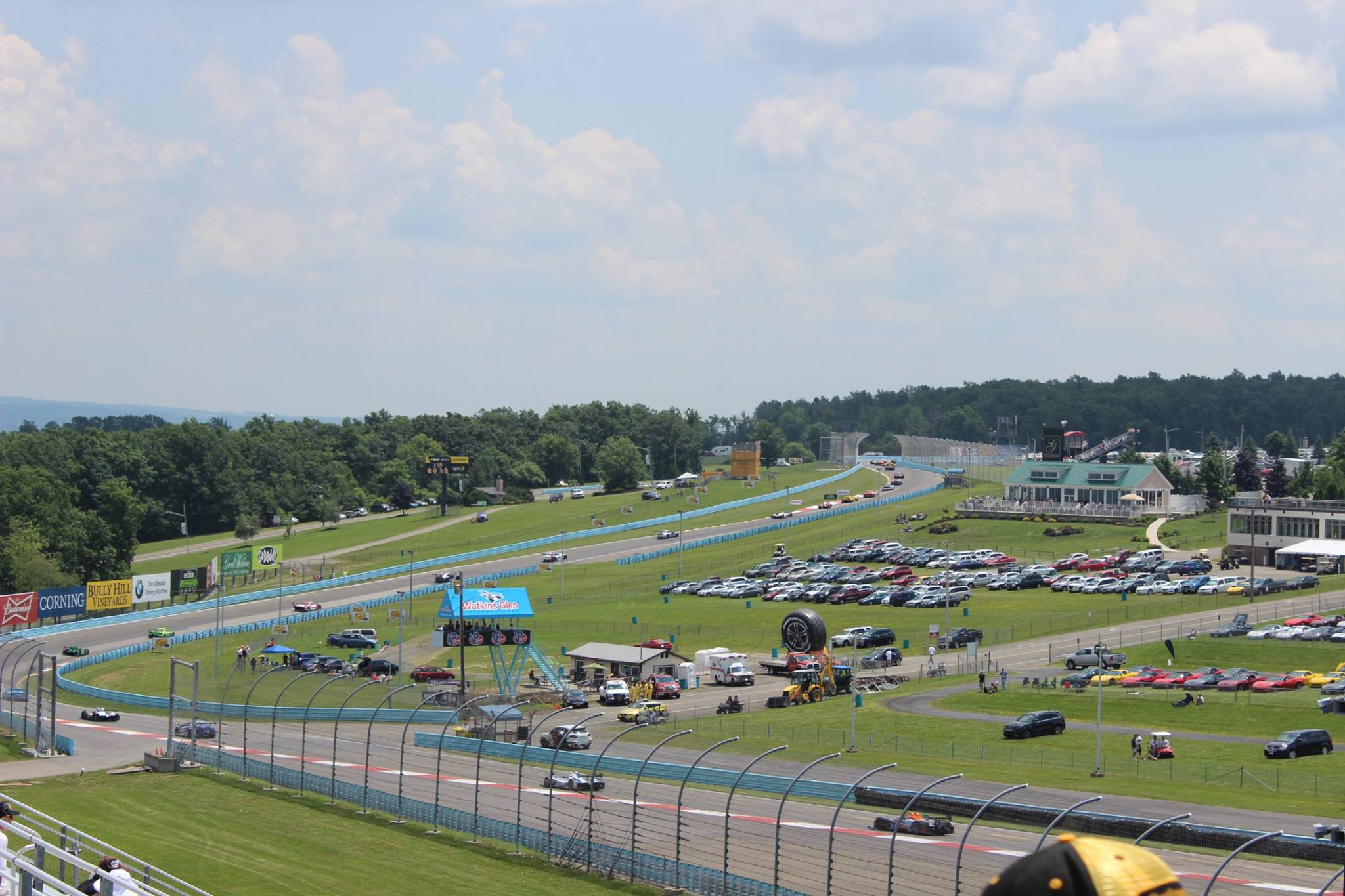
Watkins Glen International, where the race was held

International Motor Sports Association (IMSA) president John Doonan confirmed the race was part of the 2025 IMSA SportsCar Championship (IMSA SCC) in March 2024. It was the eleventh time the IMSA SCC hosted a race at Watkins Glen. The 2025 Sahlen's Six Hours of The Glen was the sixth of eleven scheduled sports car races of 2025 by IMSA. The race was held at the eleven-turn 3.450 mi (5.552 km) Watkins Glen International on June 22, 2025.

=== Standings before the race ===
The GTP Drivers' Championship was led by Felipe Nasr and Nick Tandy with 1795 points, 70 ahead of second-placed Matt Campbell and Mathieu Jaminet. Philipp Eng and Dries Vanthoor sat 83 points behind Nasr and Tandy in third place. Josh Burdon, Felipe Fraga, and Gar Robinson were leading the LMP2 Drivers' Championship with 645 points, 2 points ahead of Paul di Resta, Dan Goldburg, and Rasmus Lindh in second. Klaus Bachler and Laurin Heinrich were on top in the GTD Pro Drivers' Championship with 1014 points, 70 ahead of Antonio García and Alexander Sims in second. Albert Costa sat a further 75 points behind in third place. The GTD Drivers' Championship was topped by Philip Ellis and Russell Ward with 1372 points, 124 ahead of second-placed Jack Hawksworth and Parker Thompson. Porsche was leading the GTP and GTD Pro Manufacturers' Championships, whilst Mercedes-AMG was leading the GTD Manufacturers' Championship. Porsche Penske Motorsport, Riley, AO Racing, and Winward Racing were leading their Teams' Championships.

== Entry list ==
The entry list was published on June 11, 2025, and featured 56 entries: 13 entries in GTP, 12 entries in LMP2, ten entries in GTD Pro, and 21 entries in GTD. Sarah Bovy, Rahel Frey, Michelle Gatting were scheduled to compete for Iron Dames in the No. 83 entry, but due to a foot injury sustained by Gatting in testing for the 2025 24 Hours of Le Mans forced the team to withdraw from the event. Stevan McAleer, Sheena Monk and Mike Skeen were listed on compete for Triarsi Competizione in the No. 021 entry, but the trio were replaced by Alessandro Balzan, Jason Hart and Aaron Muss. in GTD Pro, Connor De Phillippi completed the driver lineup for Paul Miller Racing in the No. 1 entry. In GTD, Scott Hargrove completed the driver lineup for Forte Racing in the No. 78 entry, while Wyatt Brichacek did the same for Lone Star Racing's No. 80 entry. Mikey Taylor replaced Seth Lucas in the No. 32 entry by Korthoff Competition Motors prior to practice 1.

No.	Entrant	Car	Driver 1	Driver 2	Driver 3
GTP (Grand Touring Prototype) (13 entries)
5	(Germany) Proton Competition	Porsche 963	(Switzerland) Neel Jani	(Chile) Nico Pino	(Argentina) Nicolás Varrone
6	(Germany) Porsche Penske Motorsport	Porsche 963	(Australia) Matt Campbell	(France) Mathieu Jaminet	
7	(Germany) Porsche Penske Motorsport	Porsche 963	(Brazil) Felipe Nasr	(United Kingdom) Nick Tandy	
10	(United States) Cadillac Wayne Taylor Racing	Cadillac V-Series.R	(Portugal) Filipe Albuquerque	(United States) Ricky Taylor	
23	(United States) Aston Martin THOR Team	Aston Martin Valkyrie	(Canada) Roman De Angelis	(United Kingdom) Ross Gunn	
24	(United States) BMW M Team RLL	BMW M Hybrid V8	(Austria) Philipp Eng	(Belgium) Dries Vanthoor	
25	(United States) BMW M Team RLL	BMW M Hybrid V8	(South Africa) Sheldon van der Linde	(Germany) Marco Wittmann	
31	(United States) Cadillac Whelen	Cadillac V-Series.R	(United Kingdom) Jack Aitken	(New Zealand) Earl Bamber	(Denmark) Frederik Vesti
40	(United States) Cadillac Wayne Taylor Racing	Cadillac V-Series.R	(Switzerland) Louis Delétraz	(United States) Jordan Taylor	
60	(United States) Acura Meyer Shank Racing with Curb-Agajanian	Acura ARX-06	(United Kingdom) Tom Blomqvist	(United States) Colin Braun	
63	(Italy) Automobili Lamborghini Squadra Corse	Lamborghini SC63	(France) Romain Grosjean	Daniil Kvyat (Note: Kvyat is Russian, but he competes as a neutral competitor as Russian national emblems were banned by the FIA following the Russian invasion of Ukraine.)	
85	(United States) JDC–Miller MotorSports	Porsche 963	(Italy) Gianmaria Bruni	(Netherlands) Tijmen van der Helm	
93	(United States) Acura Meyer Shank Racing with Curb-Agajanian	Acura ARX-06	(Japan) Kakunoshin Ohta	(United Kingdom) Nick Yelloly	(Netherlands) Renger van der Zande
LMP2 (Le Mans Prototype 2) (12 entries)
04	(Portugal) CrowdStrike Racing by APR	Oreca 07-Gibson	(Denmark) Malthe Jakobsen	(United States) George Kurtz	(United Kingdom) Toby Sowery
2	(United States) United Autosports USA	Oreca 07-Gibson	(United States) Nick Boulle	(United States) Juan Manuel Correa	(United Kingdom) Ben Hanley
8	(Canada) Tower Motorsports	Oreca 07-Gibson	(Mexico) Sebastián Álvarez	(France) Sébastien Bourdais	(Canada) John Farano
11	(France) TDS Racing	Oreca 07-Gibson	(Denmark) Mikkel Jensen	(New Zealand) Hunter McElrea	(United States) Steven Thomas
18	(United States) Era Motorsport	Oreca 07-Gibson	(France) Paul-Loup Chatin	(Denmark) David Heinemeier Hansson	(Canada) Tobias Lütke
22	(United States) United Autosports USA	Oreca 07-Gibson	(United States) Dan Goldburg	(United Kingdom) Paul di Resta	(Sweden) Rasmus Lindh
43	(Poland) Inter Europol Competition	Oreca 07-Gibson	(United States) Jeremy Clarke	(France) Tom Dillmann	(United States) Bijoy Garg
52	(United States) PR1/Mathiasen Motorsports	Oreca 07-Gibson	(Switzerland) Mathias Beche	(Denmark) Benjamin Pedersen	(United States) Rodrigo Sales
73	(United States) Pratt Miller Motorsports	Oreca 07-Gibson	(Canada) Chris Cumming	(Portugal) Manuel Espírito Santo	(Brazil) Pietro Fittipaldi
74	(United States) Riley	Oreca 07-Gibson	(Australia) Josh Burdon	(Brazil) Felipe Fraga	(United States) Gar Robinson
88	(Italy) AF Corse	Oreca 07-Gibson	(Argentina) Luis Pérez Companc	(Argentina) Matías Pérez Companc	(France) Matthieu Vaxivière
99	(United States) AO Racing	Oreca 07-Gibson	(United States) Dane Cameron	(United Kingdom) Jonny Edgar	(United States) P. J. Hyett
GTD Pro (GT Daytona Pro) (10 entries)
1	(United States) Paul Miller Racing	BMW M4 GT3 Evo	(United States) Connor De Phillippi	(United States) Madison Snow	(United States) Neil Verhagen
3	(United States) Corvette Racing by Pratt Miller Motorsports	Chevrolet Corvette Z06 GT3.R	(Spain) Antonio García	(United Kingdom) Alexander Sims	
4	(United States) Corvette Racing by Pratt Miller Motorsports	Chevrolet Corvette Z06 GT3.R	(Netherlands) Nicky Catsburg	(United States) Tommy Milner	
9	(Canada) Pfaff Motorsports	Lamborghini Huracán GT3 Evo 2	(Italy) Andrea Caldarelli	(United Kingdom) Sandy Mitchell	
14	(United States) Vasser Sullivan Racing	Lexus RC F GT3	(United Kingdom) Ben Barnicoat	(United States) Aaron Telitz	
48	(United States) Paul Miller Racing	BMW M4 GT3 Evo	(United Kingdom) Dan Harper	(Germany) Max Hesse	
64	(Canada) Ford Multimatic Motorsports	Ford Mustang GT3	(United Kingdom) Sebastian Priaulx	(Germany) Mike Rockenfeller	
65	(Canada) Ford Multimatic Motorsports	Ford Mustang GT3	(Germany) Christopher Mies	(Belgium) Frédéric Vervisch	
77	(United States) AO Racing	Porsche 911 GT3 R (992)	(Austria) Klaus Bachler	(Germany) Laurin Heinrich	
81	(United States) DragonSpeed	Ferrari 296 GT3	(Spain) Albert Costa	(Italy) Davide Rigon	
GTD (GT Daytona) (20 entries)
021	(United States) Triarsi Competizione	Ferrari 296 GT3	(Italy) Alessandro Balzan	(United States) Jason Hart	(United States) Aaron Muss
023	(United States) Triarsi Competizione	Ferrari 296 GT3	(United Kingdom) James Calado	(United States) Onofrio Triarsi	(New Zealand) Andrew Waite
12	(United States) Vasser Sullivan Racing	Lexus RC F GT3	(United Kingdom) Jack Hawksworth	(United States) Frankie Montecalvo	(Canada) Parker Thompson
13	(Canada) AWA	Chevrolet Corvette Z06 GT3.R	(United Kingdom) Matt Bell	(Canada) Orey Fidani	(Germany) Lars Kern
19	(United States) van der Steur Racing	Aston Martin Vantage AMR GT3 Evo	(France) Valentin Hasse-Clot	(United States) Anthony McIntosh	(United States) Rory van der Steur
21	(Italy) AF Corse	Ferrari 296 GT3	(United States) Simon Mann	(Italy) Alessandro Pier Guidi	(France) Lilou Wadoux
27	(United States) Heart of Racing Team	Aston Martin Vantage AMR GT3 Evo	(United Kingdom) Tom Gamble	(Canada) Zacharie Robichon	(United Kingdom) Casper Stevenson
32	(United States) Korthoff Competition Motors	Mercedes-AMG GT3 Evo	(United States) Kenton Koch	(Canada) Daniel Morad	(South Africa) Mikey Taylor
34	(United States) Conquest Racing	Ferrari 296 GT3	(United States) Manny Franco	(Brazil) Daniel Serra	(United Kingdom) Ben Tuck
36	(United States) DXDT Racing	Chevrolet Corvette Z06 GT3.R	(Republic of Ireland) Charlie Eastwood	(United States) Alec Udell	(Turkey) Salih Yoluç
44	(United States) Magnus Racing	Aston Martin Vantage AMR GT3 Evo	(United States) John Potter	(United States) Spencer Pumpelly	(Denmark) Marco Sørensen
45	(United States) Wayne Taylor Racing	Lamborghini Huracán GT3 Evo 2	(United States) Graham Doyle	(Costa Rica) Danny Formal	(United States) Trent Hindman
47	(Italy) Cetilar Racing	Ferrari 296 GT3	(Italy) Antonio Fuoco	(Italy) Lorenzo Patrese	(Italy) Giorgio Sernagiotto
57	(United States) Winward Racing	Mercedes-AMG GT3 Evo	(Netherlands) Indy Dontje	(Switzerland) Philip Ellis	(United States) Russell Ward
66	(United States) Gradient Racing	Ford Mustang GT3	(United Kingdom) Till Bechtolsheimer	(Colombia) Tatiana Calderón	(United States) Joey Hand
70	(United Kingdom) Inception Racing	Ferrari 296 GT3	(United States) Brendan Iribe	(United Kingdom) Ollie Millroy	(Denmark) Frederik Schandorff
78	(United States) Forte Racing	Lamborghini Huracán GT3 Evo 2	(Germany) Mario Farnbacher	(Canada) Misha Goikhberg	(Canada) Scott Hargrove
80	(United States) Lone Star Racing	Mercedes-AMG GT3 Evo	(Australia) Scott Andrews	(United States) Wyatt Brichacek	(United States) Dan Knox
96	(United States) Turner Motorsport	BMW M4 GT3 Evo	(United States) Robby Foley	(United States) Patrick Gallagher	(United States) Jake Walker
120	(United States) Wright Motorsports	Porsche 911 GT3 R (992)	(United States) Adam Adelson	(Australia) Tom Sargent	(United States) Elliott Skeer

== Qualifying ==
Saturday's afternoon qualifying was broken into four sessions, with one session for the GTP, LMP2, GTD Pro, and GTD classes each. The rules dictated that all teams nominated a driver to qualify their cars, with the Pro-Am LMP2 class requiring a Bronze rated driver to qualify the car. The competitors' fastest lap times determined the starting order. The competitors' fastest lap times determined the starting order. IMSA then arranged the grid to put GTPs ahead of the LMP2, GTD Pro, and GTD cars.

=== Qualifying results ===
Pole positions in each class are indicated in bold and with ‡.

Pos.	Class	No.	Entry	Driver	Time	Gap	Grid
1	**GTP**	**93**	**(United States) Acura Meyer Shank Racing with Curb-Agajanian**	**(Netherlands) Renger van der Zande**	**1:31.558**	—	1‡
2	GTP	31	(United States) Cadillac Whelen	(United Kingdom) Jack Aitken	1:31.845	+0.287	2
3	GTP	60	(United States) Acura Meyer Shank Racing with Curb-Agajanian	(United States) Colin Braun	1:32.167	+0.609	3
4	GTP	10	(United States) Cadillac Wayne Taylor Racing	(United States) Ricky Taylor	1:32.444	+0.886	4
5	GTP	40	(United States) Cadillac Wayne Taylor Racing	(Switzerland) Louis Delétraz	1:32.566	+1.008	5
6	GTP	24	(United States) BMW M Team RLL	(Belgium) Dries Vanthoor	1:32.977	+1.419	6
7	GTP	25	(United States) BMW M Team RLL	(South Africa) Sheldon van der Linde	1:33.106	+1.548	7
8	GTP	6	(Germany) Porsche Penske Motorsport	(France) Mathieu Jaminet	1:33.323	+1.765	8
9	GTP	23	(United States) Aston Martin THOR Team	(United Kingdom) Ross Gunn	1:33.360	+1.802	9
10	GTP	7	(Germany) Porsche Penske Motorsport	(Brazil) Felipe Nasr	1:33.382	+1.824	10
11	GTP	63	(Italy) Automobili Lamborghini Squadra Corse	(France) Romain Grosjean	1:33.479	+1.921	11
12	GTP	5	(Germany) Proton Competition	(Argentina) Nicolás Varrone	1:33.553	+1.975	12
13	GTP	85	(United States) JDC–Miller MotorSports	(Netherlands) Tijmen van der Helm	1:34.294	+2.736	13
14	**LMP2**	**99**	**(United States) AO Racing**	**(United States) P. J. Hyett**	**1:35.878**	**+4.320**	14‡
15	LMP2	11	(France) TDS Racing	(United States) Steven Thomas	1:36.051	+4.493	15
16	LMP2	22	(United States) United Autosports USA	(United States) Dan Goldburg	1:36.683	+5.125	16
17	LMP2	2	(United States) United Autosports USA	(United States) Nick Boulle	1:37.018	+5.640	17
18	LMP2	18	(United States) Era Motorsport	(Canada) Tobias Lütke	1:37.133	+5.575	18
19	LMP2	43	(Poland) Inter Europol Competition	(United States) Jeremy Clarke	1:37.147	+5.589	19
20	LMP2	74	(United States) Riley	(United States) Gar Robinson	1:37.232	+5.674	20
21	LMP2	88	(Italy) AF Corse	(Argentina) Luis Pérez Companc	1:37.311	+5.753	21
22	LMP2	73	(United States) Pratt Miller Motorsports	(Canada) Chris Cumming	1:37.526	+5.968	22
23	LMP2	04	(Portugal) CrowdStrike Racing by APR	(United States) George Kurtz	1:37.558	+6.000	23
24	LMP2	52	(United States) PR1/Mathiasen Motorsports	(United States) Rodrigo Sales	1:37.851	+6.293	24
25	LMP2	8	(Canada) Tower Motorsports	(Canada) John Farano	1:39.334	+7.776	25
26	**GTD Pro**	**9**	**(Canada) Pfaff Motorsports**	**(Italy) Andrea Caldarelli**	**1:44.595**	**+13.037**	26‡
27	GTD Pro	48	(United States) Paul Miller Racing	(United Kingdom) Dan Harper	1:44.737	+13.179	27
28	**GTD**	**27**	**(United States) Heart of Racing Team**	**(Canada) Zacharie Robichon**	**1:44.788**	**+13.230**	36‡
29	GTD	36	(United States) DXDT Racing	(United States) Alec Udell	1:44.999	+13.441	37
30	GTD	32	(United States) Korthoff Competition Motors	(Canada) Daniel Morad	1:45.212	+13.654	38
31	GTD	57	(United States) Winward Racing	(United States) Russell Ward	1:45.236	+13.678	39
32	GTD Pro	4	(United States) Corvette Racing by Pratt Miller Motorsports	(Netherlands) Nicky Catsburg	1:45.296	+13.738	28
33	GTD Pro	81	(United States) DragonSpeed	(Spain) Albert Costa	1:45.326	+13.768	29
34	GTD	12	(United States) Vasser Sullivan Racing	(Canada) Parker Thompson	1:45.443	+13.885	40
35	GTD Pro	14	(United States) Vasser Sullivan Racing	(United States) Aaron Telitz	1:45.450	+13.892	30
36	GTD Pro	3	(United States) Corvette Racing by Pratt Miller Motorsports	(United Kingdom) Alexander Sims	1:45.490	+13.932	31
37	GTD Pro	64	(Canada) Ford Multimatic Motorsports	(Germany) Mike Rockenfeller	1:45.517	+13.959	32
38	GTD Pro	1	(United States) Paul Miller Racing	(United States) Madison Snow	1:45.532	+13.974	33
39	GTD Pro	77	(United States) AO Racing	(Austria) Klaus Bachler	1:45.572	+14.014	34
40	GTD Pro	65	(Canada) Ford Multimatic Motorsports	(Germany) Christopher Mies	1:56.646	+14.088	35
41	GTD	47	(Italy) Cetilar Racing	(Italy) Lorenzo Patrese	1:45.696	+14.138	41
42	GTD	023	(United States) Triarsi Competizione	(United States) Onofrio Triarsi	1:45.882	+14.324	42
43	GTD	78	(United States) Forte Racing	(Canada) Misha Goikhberg	1:45.906	+14.348	43
44	GTD	19	(United States) van der Steur Racing	(United States) Anthony McIntosh	1:46.013	+14.455	44
45	GTD	96	(United States) Turner Motorsport	(United States) Patrick Gallagher	1:46.213	+14.655	45
46	GTD	70	(United Kingdom) Inception Racing	(United States) Brendan Iribe	1:46.529	+14.971	46
47	GTD	44	(United States) Magnus Racing	(United States) John Potter	1:46.548	+14.990	47
48	GTD	34	(United States) Conquest Racing	(United States) Manny Franco	1:46.779	+15.221	48
49	GTD	021	(United States) Triarsi Competizione	(United States) Aaron Muss	1:47.416	+15.858	49
50	GTD	120	(United States) Wright Motorsports	(United States) Adam Adelson	1:47.465	+15.907	50
51	GTD	66	(United States) Gradient Racing	(United Kingdom) Till Bechtolsheimer	1:47.690	+16.132	51
52	GTD	45	(United States) Wayne Taylor Racing	(United States) Graham Doyle	1:48.138	+16.580	52
53	GTD	13	(Canada) AWA	(Canada) Orey Fidani	1:48.611	+17.053	53
54	GTD	80	(United States) Lone Star Racing	(United States) Dan Knox	1:49.332	+17.774	54
55	GTD	21	(Italy) AF Corse	(Italy) Alessandro Pier Guidi	No time set (Note: The No. 21 AF Corse Ferrari had all its lap times disallowed due to failing post-qualifying technical inspection, with an unplugged mandatory sensory permitted by IMSA regulations.)		55

== Race ==
=== Post-race ===
The final results allowed Campbell and Jaminet to take the lead of GTP Drivers' Championship with 2028 points, 12 ahead of Nasr and Tandy. As a result of winning the race, Goldburgh, di Resta, and Lindh took the lead of the LMP2 Drivers' Championship. By finishing second-place García and Sims took the take the lead of the GTD Pro Drivers' Championship with 1632 points. The final results of GTD kept Ellis and ward atop the GTD Drivers' Championship, 60 points ahead of race-winner Stevenson. Porsche Penske Motorsport and Winward Racing continued to top their respective Teams' Championships, United Autosports USA and Corvette Racing by Pratt Miller Motorsports became the leaders of their Teams' Championships. Porsche and Mercedes-AMG continued to their Manufacturers' Championship, while Chevrolet took took the lead of the GTD Pro Manufacturers' Championship with 5 rounds remaining in the season.

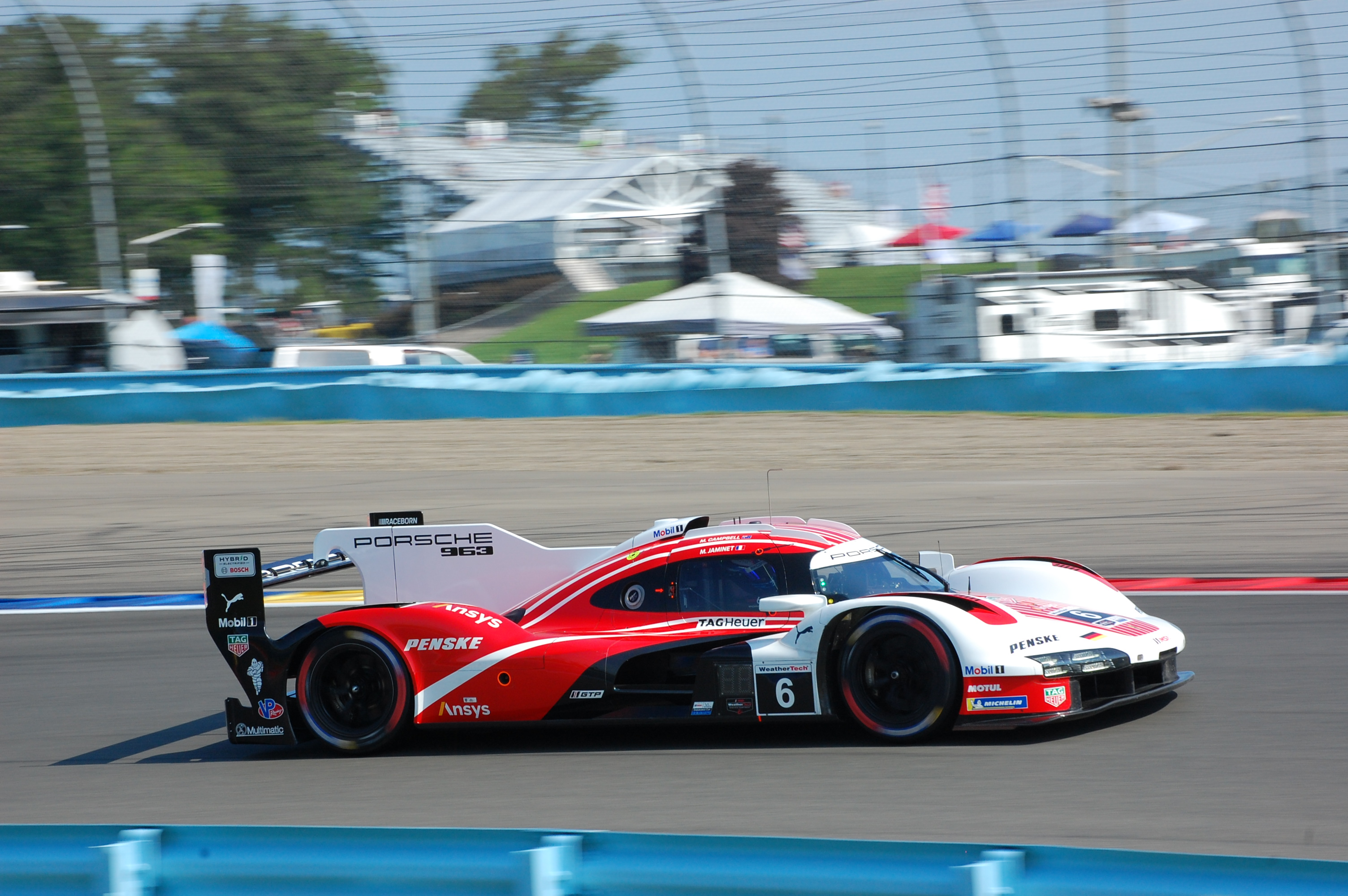
The No. 6 Porsche Penske car leads the GTP Teams' Championship after the race.

Class winners are in bold and ‡.

Pos	Class	No	Team	Drivers	Chassis	Laps	Time/Retired
Pos	Class	No	Team	Drivers	Engine	Laps	Time/Retired
1	**GTP**	**60**	**(United States) Acura Meyer Shank Racing w/ Curb-Agajanian**	**(United Kingdom) Tom Blomqvist (United States) Colin Braun**	**Acura ARX-06**	**169**	**6:00:08.598‡**
1	**GTP**	**60**	**(United States) Acura Meyer Shank Racing w/ Curb-Agajanian**	**(United Kingdom) Tom Blomqvist (United States) Colin Braun**	**Acura AR24e 2.4 L turbo V6**	**169**	**6:00:08.598‡**
2	GTP	40	(United States) Cadillac Wayne Taylor Racing	(Switzerland) Louis Delétraz (United States) Jordan Taylor	Cadillac V-Series.R	169	+1.880
2	GTP	40	(United States) Cadillac Wayne Taylor Racing	(Switzerland) Louis Delétraz (United States) Jordan Taylor	Cadillac LMC55R 5.5 L V8	169	+1.880
3	GTP	10	(United States) Cadillac Wayne Taylor Racing	(Portugal) Filipe Albuquerque (United States) Ricky Taylor	Cadillac V-Series.R	169	+5.265
3	GTP	10	(United States) Cadillac Wayne Taylor Racing	(Portugal) Filipe Albuquerque (United States) Ricky Taylor	Cadillac LMC55R 5.5 L V8	169	+5.265
4	GTP	6	(Germany) Porsche Penske Motorsport	(Australia) Matt Campbell (France) Mathieu Jaminet	Porsche 963	169	+6.981
4	GTP	6	(Germany) Porsche Penske Motorsport	(Australia) Matt Campbell (France) Mathieu Jaminet	Porsche 9RD 4.6 L turbo V8	169	+6.981
5	GTP	31	(United States) Cadillac Whelen	(United Kingdom) Jack Aitken (New Zealand) Earl Bamber (Denmark) Frederik Vesti	Cadillac V-Series.R	169	+37.830
5	GTP	31	(United States) Cadillac Whelen	(United Kingdom) Jack Aitken (New Zealand) Earl Bamber (Denmark) Frederik Vesti	Cadillac LMC55R 5.5 L V8	169	+37.830
6	GTP	93	(United States) Acura Meyer Shank Racing w/ Curb-Agajanian	(Japan) Kakunoshin Ohta (United Kingdom) Nick Yelloly (Netherlands) Renger van der Zande	Acura ARX-06	169	+41.277
6	GTP	93	(United States) Acura Meyer Shank Racing w/ Curb-Agajanian	(Japan) Kakunoshin Ohta (United Kingdom) Nick Yelloly (Netherlands) Renger van der Zande	Acura AR24e 2.4 L turbo V6	169	+41.277
7	GTP	63	(Italy) Automobili Lamborghini Squadra Corse	(France) Romain Grosjean; Daniil Kvyat	Lamborghini SC63	169	+41.351
7	GTP	63	(Italy) Automobili Lamborghini Squadra Corse	(France) Romain Grosjean; Daniil Kvyat	Lamborghini 3.8 L turbo V8	169	+41.351
8	GTP	24	(United States) BMW M Team RLL	(Austria) Philipp Eng (Belgium) Dries Vanthoor	BMW M Hybrid V8	169	+44.081
8	GTP	24	(United States) BMW M Team RLL	(Austria) Philipp Eng (Belgium) Dries Vanthoor	BMW P66/3 4.0 L turbo V8	169	+44.081
9	GTP	23	(United States) Aston Martin THOR Team	(Canada) Roman De Angelis (United Kingdom) Ross Gunn	Aston Martin Valkyrie	168	+1 Lap
9	GTP	23	(United States) Aston Martin THOR Team	(Canada) Roman De Angelis (United Kingdom) Ross Gunn	Aston Martin RA 6.5 L V12	168	+1 Lap
10 DNF	GTP	85	(United States) JDC–Miller MotorSports	(Italy) Gianmaria Bruni (Netherlands) Tijmen van der Helm	Porsche 963	168	Did not finish
10 DNF	GTP	85	(United States) JDC–Miller MotorSports	(Italy) Gianmaria Bruni (Netherlands) Tijmen van der Helm	Porsche 9RD 4.6 L turbo V8	168	Did not finish
11	**LMP2**	**22**	**(United States) United Autosports USA**	**(United States) Dan Goldburg (United Kingdom) Paul di Resta (Sweden) Rasmus Lindh**	**Oreca 07**	**167**	**+2 Laps‡**
11	**LMP2**	**22**	**(United States) United Autosports USA**	**(United States) Dan Goldburg (United Kingdom) Paul di Resta (Sweden) Rasmus Lindh**	**Gibson GK428 4.2 L V8**	**167**	**+2 Laps‡**
12	LMP2	99	(United States) AO Racing	(United States) Dane Cameron (United Kingdom) Jonny Edgar (United States) P. J. Hyett	Oreca 07	167	+2 Laps
12	LMP2	99	(United States) AO Racing	(United States) Dane Cameron (United Kingdom) Jonny Edgar (United States) P. J. Hyett	Gibson GK428 4.2 L V8	167	+2 Laps
13	LMP2	04	(Portugal) CrowdStrike Racing by APR	(Denmark) Malthe Jakobsen (United States) George Kurtz (United Kingdom) Toby Sowery	Oreca 07	167	+2 Laps
13	LMP2	04	(Portugal) CrowdStrike Racing by APR	(Denmark) Malthe Jakobsen (United States) George Kurtz (United Kingdom) Toby Sowery	Gibson GK428 4.2 L V8	167	+2 Laps
14	LMP2	18	(United States) Era Motorsport	(France) Paul-Loup Chatin (Denmark) David Heinemeier Hansson (Canada) Tobias Lütke	Oreca 07	167	+2 Laps
14	LMP2	18	(United States) Era Motorsport	(France) Paul-Loup Chatin (Denmark) David Heinemeier Hansson (Canada) Tobias Lütke	Gibson GK428 4.2 L V8	167	+2 Laps
15	LMP2	74	(United States) Riley	(Australia) Josh Burdon (Brazil) Felipe Fraga (United States) Gar Robinson	Oreca 07	167	+2 Laps
15	LMP2	74	(United States) Riley	(Australia) Josh Burdon (Brazil) Felipe Fraga (United States) Gar Robinson	Gibson GK428 4.2 L V8	167	+2 Laps
16	LMP2	88	(Italy) AF Corse	(Argentina) Luis Pérez Companc (Argentina) Matías Pérez Companc (France) Matthieu Vaxivière	Oreca 07	167	+2 Laps
16	LMP2	88	(Italy) AF Corse	(Argentina) Luis Pérez Companc (Argentina) Matías Pérez Companc (France) Matthieu Vaxivière	Gibson GK428 4.2 L V8	167	+2 Laps
17	LMP2	73	(United States) Pratt Miller Motorsports	(Canada) Chris Cumming (Portugal) Manuel Espírito Santo (Brazil) Pietro Fittipaldi	Oreca 07	167	+2 Laps
17	LMP2	73	(United States) Pratt Miller Motorsports	(Canada) Chris Cumming (Portugal) Manuel Espírito Santo (Brazil) Pietro Fittipaldi	Gibson GK428 4.2 L V8	167	+2 Laps
18	LMP2	43	(Poland) Inter Europol Competition	(United States) Jeremy Clarke (France) Tom Dillmann (United States) Bijoy Garg	Oreca 07	167	+2 Laps
18	LMP2	43	(Poland) Inter Europol Competition	(United States) Jeremy Clarke (France) Tom Dillmann (United States) Bijoy Garg	Gibson GK428 4.2 L V8	167	+2 Laps
19	LMP2	8	(United States) Tower Motorsports	(Mexico) Sebastián Álvarez (France) Sébastien Bourdais (Canada) John Farano	Oreca 07	167	+2 Laps
19	LMP2	8	(United States) Tower Motorsports	(Mexico) Sebastián Álvarez (France) Sébastien Bourdais (Canada) John Farano	Gibson GK428 4.2 L V8	167	+2 Laps
20	**GTD Pro**	**48**	**(United States) Paul Miller Racing**	**(United Kingdom) Dan Harper (Germany) Max Hesse**	**BMW M4 GT3 Evo**	**160**	**+9 Laps‡**
20	**GTD Pro**	**48**	**(United States) Paul Miller Racing**	**(United Kingdom) Dan Harper (Germany) Max Hesse**	**BMW P58 3.0 L Turbo I6**	**160**	**+9 Laps‡**
21	GTD Pro	3	(United States) Corvette Racing by Pratt Miller Motorsports	(Spain) Antonio García (United Kingdom) Alexander Sims	Chevrolet Corvette Z06 GT3.R	160	+9 Laps
21	GTD Pro	3	(United States) Corvette Racing by Pratt Miller Motorsports	(Spain) Antonio García (United Kingdom) Alexander Sims	Chevrolet LT6 5.5 L V8	160	+9 Laps
22	GTD Pro	81	(United States) DragonSpeed	(Spain) Albert Costa (Italy) Davide Rigon	Ferrari 296 GT3	160	+9 Laps
22	GTD Pro	81	(United States) DragonSpeed	(Spain) Albert Costa (Italy) Davide Rigon	Ferrari F163CE 3.0 L Turbo V6	160	+9 Laps
23	GTD Pro	4	(United States) Corvette Racing by Pratt Miller Motorsports	(Netherlands) Nicky Catsburg (United States) Tommy Milner	Chevrolet Corvette Z06 GT3.R	160	+9 Laps
23	GTD Pro	4	(United States) Corvette Racing by Pratt Miller Motorsports	(Netherlands) Nicky Catsburg (United States) Tommy Milner	Chevrolet LT6 5.5 L V8	160	+9 Laps
24	GTD Pro	77	(United States) AO Racing	(Austria) Klaus Bachler (Germany) Laurin Heinrich	Porsche 911 GT3 R (992)	160	+9 Laps
24	GTD Pro	77	(United States) AO Racing	(Austria) Klaus Bachler (Germany) Laurin Heinrich	Porsche M97/80 4.2 L Flat-6	160	+9 Laps
25	**GTD**	**27**	**(United States) Heart of Racing Team**	**(United Kingdom) Tom Gamble (Canada) Zacharie Robichon (United Kingdom) Casper Stevenson**	**Aston Martin Vantage AMR GT3 Evo**	**160**	**+9 Laps‡**
25	**GTD**	**27**	**(United States) Heart of Racing Team**	**(United Kingdom) Tom Gamble (Canada) Zacharie Robichon (United Kingdom) Casper Stevenson**	**Aston Martin M177 4.0 L Turbo V8**	**160**	**+9 Laps‡**
26	GTD Pro	64	(Canada) Ford Multimatic Motorsports	(United Kingdom) Sebastian Priaulx (Germany) Mike Rockenfeller	Ford Mustang GT3	160	+9 Laps
26	GTD Pro	64	(Canada) Ford Multimatic Motorsports	(United Kingdom) Sebastian Priaulx (Germany) Mike Rockenfeller	Ford Coyote 5.4 L V8	160	+9 Laps
27	GTD	70	(United Kingdom) Inception Racing	(United States) Brendan Iribe (United Kingdom) Ollie Millroy (Denmark) Frederik Schandorff	Ferrari 296 GT3	160	+9 Laps
27	GTD	70	(United Kingdom) Inception Racing	(United States) Brendan Iribe (United Kingdom) Ollie Millroy (Denmark) Frederik Schandorff	Ferrari F163CE 3.0 L Turbo V6	160	+9 Laps
28	GTD	32	(United States) Korthoff Competition Motors	(United States) Kenton Koch (Canada) Daniel Morad (South Africa) Mikey Taylor	Mercedes-AMG GT3 Evo	160	+9 Laps
28	GTD	32	(United States) Korthoff Competition Motors	(United States) Kenton Koch (Canada) Daniel Morad (South Africa) Mikey Taylor	Mercedes-Benz M159 6.2 L V8	160	+9 Laps
29	GTD	023	(United States) Triarsi Competizione	(United Kingdom) James Calado (United States) Onofrio Triarsi (New Zealand) Andrew Waite	Ferrari 296 GT3	160	+9 Laps
29	GTD	023	(United States) Triarsi Competizione	(United Kingdom) James Calado (United States) Onofrio Triarsi (New Zealand) Andrew Waite	Ferrari F163CE 3.0 L Turbo V6	160	+9 Laps
30	GTD	21	(Italy) AF Corse	(United States) Simon Mann (Italy) Alessandro Pier Guidi (France) Lilou Wadoux	Ferrari 296 GT3	160	+9 Laps
30	GTD	21	(Italy) AF Corse	(United States) Simon Mann (Italy) Alessandro Pier Guidi (France) Lilou Wadoux	Ferrari F163CE 3.0 L Turbo V6	160	+9 Laps
31	GTD	66	(United States) Gradient Racing	(United Kingdom) Till Bechtolsheimer (Colombia) Tatiana Calderón (United States) Joey Hand	Ford Mustang GT3	160	+9 Laps
31	GTD	66	(United States) Gradient Racing	(United Kingdom) Till Bechtolsheimer (Colombia) Tatiana Calderón (United States) Joey Hand	Ford Coyote 5.4 L V8	160	+9 Laps
32	GTD	47	(Italy) Cetilar Racing	(Italy) Antonio Fuoco (Italy) Lorenzo Patrese (Italy) Giorgio Sernagiotto	Ferrari 296 GT3	160	+9 Laps
32	GTD	47	(Italy) Cetilar Racing	(Italy) Antonio Fuoco (Italy) Lorenzo Patrese (Italy) Giorgio Sernagiotto	Ferrari F163CE 3.0 L Turbo V6	160	+9 Laps
33	GTD Pro	1	(United States) Paul Miller Racing	(United States) Connor De Phillippi (United States) Madison Snow (United States) Neil Verhagen	BMW M4 GT3 Evo	160	+9 Laps
33	GTD Pro	1	(United States) Paul Miller Racing	(United States) Connor De Phillippi (United States) Madison Snow (United States) Neil Verhagen	BMW P58 3.0 L Turbo I6	160	+9 Laps
34	GTD	96	(United States) Turner Motorsport	(United States) Robby Foley (United States) Patrick Gallagher (United States) Jake Walker	BMW M4 GT3 Evo	160	+9 Laps
34	GTD	96	(United States) Turner Motorsport	(United States) Robby Foley (United States) Patrick Gallagher (United States) Jake Walker	BMW P58 3.0 L Turbo I6	160	+9 Laps
35	GTD	13	(Canada) AWA	(United Kingdom) Matt Bell (Canada) Orey Fidani (Germany) Lars Kern	Chevrolet Corvette Z06 GT3.R	160	+9 Laps
35	GTD	13	(Canada) AWA	(United Kingdom) Matt Bell (Canada) Orey Fidani (Germany) Lars Kern	Chevrolet LT6 5.5 L V8	160	+9 Laps
36	GTD	34	(United States) Conquest Racing	(United States) Manny Franco (Brazil) Daniel Serra (United Kingdom) Ben Tuck	Ferrari 296 GT3	160	+9 Laps
36	GTD	34	(United States) Conquest Racing	(United States) Manny Franco (Brazil) Daniel Serra (United Kingdom) Ben Tuck	Ferrari F163CE 3.0 L Turbo V6	160	+9 Laps
37 DNF	GTD	12	(United States) Vasser Sullivan Racing	(United Kingdom) Jack Hawksworth (United States) Frankie Montecalvo (Canada) Parker Thompson	Lexus RC F GT3	159	Did not finish
37 DNF	GTD	12	(United States) Vasser Sullivan Racing	(United Kingdom) Jack Hawksworth (United States) Frankie Montecalvo (Canada) Parker Thompson	Toyota 2UR-GSE 5.4 L V8	159	Did not finish
38 DNF	GTD	021	(United States) Triarsi Competizione	(Italy) Alessandro Balzan (United States) Jason Hart (United States) Aaron Muss	Ferrari 296 GT3	159	Did not finish
38 DNF	GTD	021	(United States) Triarsi Competizione	(Italy) Alessandro Balzan (United States) Jason Hart (United States) Aaron Muss	Ferrari F163CE 3.0 L Turbo V6	159	Did not finish
39	GTD	120	(United States) Wright Motorsports	(United States) Adam Adelson (Australia) Tom Sargent (United States) Elliott Skeer	Porsche 911 GT3 R (992)	159	+10 Laps
39	GTD	120	(United States) Wright Motorsports	(United States) Adam Adelson (Australia) Tom Sargent (United States) Elliott Skeer	Porsche M97/80 4.2 L Flat-6	159	+10 Laps
40	GTD	78	(United States) Forte Racing	(Germany) Mario Farnbacher (Canada) Misha Goikhberg (Canada) Scott Hargrove	Lamborghini Huracán GT3 Evo 2	158	+11 Laps
40	GTD	78	(United States) Forte Racing	(Germany) Mario Farnbacher (Canada) Misha Goikhberg (Canada) Scott Hargrove	Lamborghini DGF 5.2 L V10	158	+11 Laps
41 DNF	GTD	36	(United States) DXDT Racing	(Republic of Ireland) Charlie Eastwood (United States) Alec Udell (Turkey) Salih Yoluç	Chevrolet Corvette Z06 GT3.R	154	Did not finish
41 DNF	GTD	36	(United States) DXDT Racing	(Republic of Ireland) Charlie Eastwood (United States) Alec Udell (Turkey) Salih Yoluç	Chevrolet LT6 5.5 L V8	154	Did not finish
42 DNF	GTD Pro	14	(United States) Vasser Sullivan Racing	(United Kingdom) Ben Barnicoat (United States) Aaron Telitz	Lexus RC F GT3	149	Did not finish
42 DNF	GTD Pro	14	(United States) Vasser Sullivan Racing	(United Kingdom) Ben Barnicoat (United States) Aaron Telitz	Toyota 2UR-GSE 5.4 L V8	149	Did not finish
43	LMP2	2	(United States) United Autosports USA	(United States) Nick Boulle (United States) Juan Manuel Correa (United Kingdom) Ben Hanley	Oreca 07	149	+20 Laps
43	LMP2	2	(United States) United Autosports USA	(United States) Nick Boulle (United States) Juan Manuel Correa (United Kingdom) Ben Hanley	Gibson GK428 4.2 L V8	149	+20 Laps
44	GTD	57	(United States) Winward Racing	(Netherlands) Indy Dontje (Switzerland) Philip Ellis (United States) Russell Ward	Mercedes-AMG GT3 Evo	149	+20 Laps
44	GTD	57	(United States) Winward Racing	(Netherlands) Indy Dontje (Switzerland) Philip Ellis (United States) Russell Ward	Mercedes-Benz M159 6.2 L V8	149	+20 Laps
45 DNF	GTD	44	(United States) Magnus Racing	(United States) John Potter (United States) Spencer Pumpelly (Denmark) Marco Sørensen	Aston Martin Vantage AMR GT3 Evo	141	Did not finish
45 DNF	GTD	44	(United States) Magnus Racing	(United States) John Potter (United States) Spencer Pumpelly (Denmark) Marco Sørensen	Aston Martin M177 4.0 L Turbo V8	141	Did not finish
46 DNF	GTP	7	(Germany) Porsche Penske Motorsport	(Brazil) Felipe Nasr (United Kingdom) Nick Tandy	Porsche 963	126	Did not finish
46 DNF	GTP	7	(Germany) Porsche Penske Motorsport	(Brazil) Felipe Nasr (United Kingdom) Nick Tandy	Porsche 9RD 4.6 L turbo V8	126	Did not finish
47 DNF	GTD	19	(United States) van der Steur Racing	(France) Valentin Hasse-Clot (United States) Anthony McIntosh (United States) Rory van der Steur	Aston Martin Vantage AMR GT3 Evo	104	Did not finish
47 DNF	GTD	19	(United States) van der Steur Racing	(France) Valentin Hasse-Clot (United States) Anthony McIntosh (United States) Rory van der Steur	Aston Martin M177 4.0 L Turbo V8	104	Did not finish
48 DNF	GTP	25	(United States) BMW M Team RLL	(South Africa) Sheldon van der Linde (Germany) Marco Wittmann	BMW M Hybrid V8	103	Did not finish
48 DNF	GTP	25	(United States) BMW M Team RLL	(South Africa) Sheldon van der Linde (Germany) Marco Wittmann	BMW P66/3 4.0 L turbo V8	103	Did not finish
49 DNF	GTP	5	(Germany) Proton Competition	(Switzerland) Neel Jani (Chile) Nico Pino (Argentina) Nicolás Varrone	Porsche 963	67	Did not finish
49 DNF	GTP	5	(Germany) Proton Competition	(Switzerland) Neel Jani (Chile) Nico Pino (Argentina) Nicolás Varrone	Porsche 9RD 4.6 L turbo V8	67	Did not finish
50 DNF	GTD Pro	9	(Canada) Pfaff Motorsports	(Italy) Andrea Caldarelli (United Kingdom) Sandy Mitchell	Lamborghini Huracán GT3 Evo 2	67	Did not finish
50 DNF	GTD Pro	9	(Canada) Pfaff Motorsports	(Italy) Andrea Caldarelli (United Kingdom) Sandy Mitchell	Lamborghini DGF 5.2 L V10	67	Did not finish
51	GTD Pro	65	(Canada) Ford Multimatic Motorsports	(Germany) Christopher Mies (Belgium) Frédéric Vervisch	Ford Mustang GT3	160	+9 Laps (Note: The No. 65 Ford Multimatic Motorsports originally finished 3rd in the GTD Pro class, but was later moved to the back of the class after post-race inspection revealed tire pressures exceeding the allowed limit.)
51	GTD Pro	65	(Canada) Ford Multimatic Motorsports	(Germany) Christopher Mies (Belgium) Frédéric Vervisch	Ford Coyote 5.4 L V8	160	+9 Laps
52 DNF	GTD	80	(United States) Lone Star Racing	(Australia) Scott Andrews (United States) Wyatt Brichacek (United States) Dan Knox	Mercedes-AMG GT3 Evo	64	Did not finish
52 DNF	GTD	80	(United States) Lone Star Racing	(Australia) Scott Andrews (United States) Wyatt Brichacek (United States) Dan Knox	Mercedes-Benz M159 6.2 L V8	64	Did not finish
53 DNF	LMP2	11	(France) TDS Racing	(Denmark) Mikkel Jensen (New Zealand) Hunter McElrea (United States) Steven Thomas	Oreca 07	29	Did not finish
53 DNF	LMP2	11	(France) TDS Racing	(Denmark) Mikkel Jensen (New Zealand) Hunter McElrea (United States) Steven Thomas	Gibson GK428 4.2 L V8	29	Did not finish
54 DNF	LMP2	52	(United States) PR1/Mathiasen Motorsports	(Switzerland) Mathias Beche (Denmark) Benjamin Pedersen (United States) Rodrigo Sales	Oreca 07	25	Did not finish
54 DNF	LMP2	52	(United States) PR1/Mathiasen Motorsports	(Switzerland) Mathias Beche (Denmark) Benjamin Pedersen (United States) Rodrigo Sales	Gibson GK428 4.2 L V8	25	Did not finish
55 DNF	GTD	45	(United States) Wayne Taylor Racing	(United States) Graham Doyle (Costa Rica) Danny Formal (United States) Trent Hindman	Lamborghini Huracán GT3 Evo 2	16	Did not finish
55 DNF	GTD	45	(United States) Wayne Taylor Racing	(United States) Graham Doyle (Costa Rica) Danny Formal (United States) Trent Hindman	Lamborghini DGF 5.2 L V10	16	Did not finish

== Standings after the race ==
GTP Drivers' Championship standings
Pos.	+/–	Driver	Points
1	1	(France) Mathieu Jaminet (Australia) Matt Campbell	2028
2	1	(Brazil) Felipe Nasr (United Kingdom) Nick Tandy	2016
3	1	(United Kingdom) Nick Yelloly (Netherlands) Renger van der Zande	1766
4	1	(Austria) Philipp Eng (Belgium) Dries Vanthoor	1753
5		(Portugal) Filipe Albuquerque (United States) Ricky Taylor	1749

LMP2 Drivers' Championship standings
Pos.	+/–	Driver	Points
1	1	(United States) Dan Goldburg (United Kingdom) Paul di Resta (Sweden) Rasmus Lindh	1023
2	1	(Brazil) Felipe Fraga (United States) Gar Robinson (Australia) Josh Burdon	929
3	3	(United States) Dane Cameron (United States) P. J. Hyett (United Kingdom) Jonny Edgar	912
4	4	(United States) George Kurtz (Denmark) Malthe Jakobsen (United Kingdom) Toby Sowery	866
5	2	(United States) Bijoy Garg (France) Tom Dillmann	857

GTD Pro Drivers' Championship standings
Pos.	+/–	Driver	Points
1	1	(Spain) Antonio García (United Kingdom) Alexander Sims	1632
2	1	(Austria) Klaus Bachler (Germany) Laurin Heinrich	1580
3	1	(Spain) Albert Costa	1518
4	1	(United Kingdom) Sebastian Priaulx (Germany) Mike Rockenfeller	1517
5	1	(United Kingdom) Dan Harper (Germany) Max Hesse	1510

GTD Drivers' Championship standings
Pos.	+/–	Driver	Points
1		(Switzerland) Philip Ellis (United States) Russell Ward	1550
2	2	(United Kingdom) Casper Stevenson	1490
3	1	(United Kingdom) Jack Hawksworth (Canada) Parker Thompson	1474
4	1	(United States) Adam Adelson (United States) Elliott Skeer	1362
5		(United States) Robby Foley (United States) Patrick Gallagher	1329

Note: Only the top five positions are included for all sets of standings.

GTP Teams' Championship standings
Pos.	+/–	Team	Points
1	1	(Germany) #6 Porsche Penske Motorsport	2028
2	1	(Germany) #7 Porsche Penske Motorsport	2016
3	1	(United States) #93 Acura Meyer Shank Racing w/ Curb-Agajanian	1766
4	1	(United States) #24 BMW M Team RLL	1753
5		(United States) #10 Cadillac Wayne Taylor Racing	1749

LMP2 Teams' Championship standings
Pos.	+/–	Team	Points
1	1	(United States) #22 United Autosports USA	1023
2	1	(United States) #74 Riley	929
3	3	(United States) #99 AO Racing	912
4	4	(Portugal) #04 CrowdStrike Racing by APR	866
5	2	(Poland) #43 Inter Europol Competition	857

GTD Pro Teams' Championship standings
Pos.	+/–	Team	Points
1	1	(United States) #3 Corvette Racing by Pratt Miller Motorsports	1632
2	1	(United States) #77 AO Racing	1580
3	4	(United States) #81 DragonSpeed	1518
4	1	(Canada) #64 Ford Multimatic Motorsports	1517
5	1	(United States) #48 Paul Miller Racing	1510

GTD Teams' Championship standings
Pos.	+/–	Team	Points
1		(United States) #57 Winward Racing	1550
2	2	(United States) #27 Heart of Racing Team	1490
3	1	(United States) #12 Vasser Sullivan Racing	1474
4	1	(United States) #120 Wright Motorsports	1362
5		(United States) #96 Turner Motorsport	1329

Note: Only the top five positions are included for all sets of standings.

GTP Manufacturers' Championship standings
Pos.	+/–	Manufacturer	Points
1		(Germany) Porsche	2182
2	1	(Japan) Acura	2092
3	1	(United States) Cadillac	1974
4	1	(Germany) BMW	1962
5		(United Kingdom) Aston Martin	1439

GTD Pro Manufacturers' Championship standings
Pos.	+/–	Manufacturer	Points
1	2	(United States) Chevrolet	1668
2	2	(Germany) BMW	1638
3	1	(Germany) Porsche	1626
4	3	(United States) Ford	1624
5		(Italy) Ferrari	1565

GTD Manufacturers' Championship standings
Pos.	+/–	Manufacturer	Points
1		(Germany) Mercedes-AMG	1734
2		(Japan) Lexus	1577
3	2	(United Kingdom) Aston Martin	1571
4	1	(Germany) Porsche	1558
5	1	(Italy) Ferrari	1554

Note: Only the top five positions are included for all sets of standings.

IMSA SportsCar Championship
Previous race: Chevrolet Detroit Sports Car Classic	2025 season	Next race: Chevrolet Grand Prix
