= 2025 IMSA Battle on the Bricks =

Tenth round of the 2025 IMSA SportsCar Championship season

The layout of Indianapolis Motor Speedway, where the race was held

The 2025 IMSA Battle on the Bricks (officially known as the 2025 Tirerack.com Battle on the Bricks) was a sports car race held at Indianapolis Motor Speedway in Speedway, Indiana, on September 21, 2025. It was the tenth round of the 2025 IMSA SportsCar Championship, as well as the fourth round of the Michelin Endurance Cup.

== Background ==
=== Preview ===
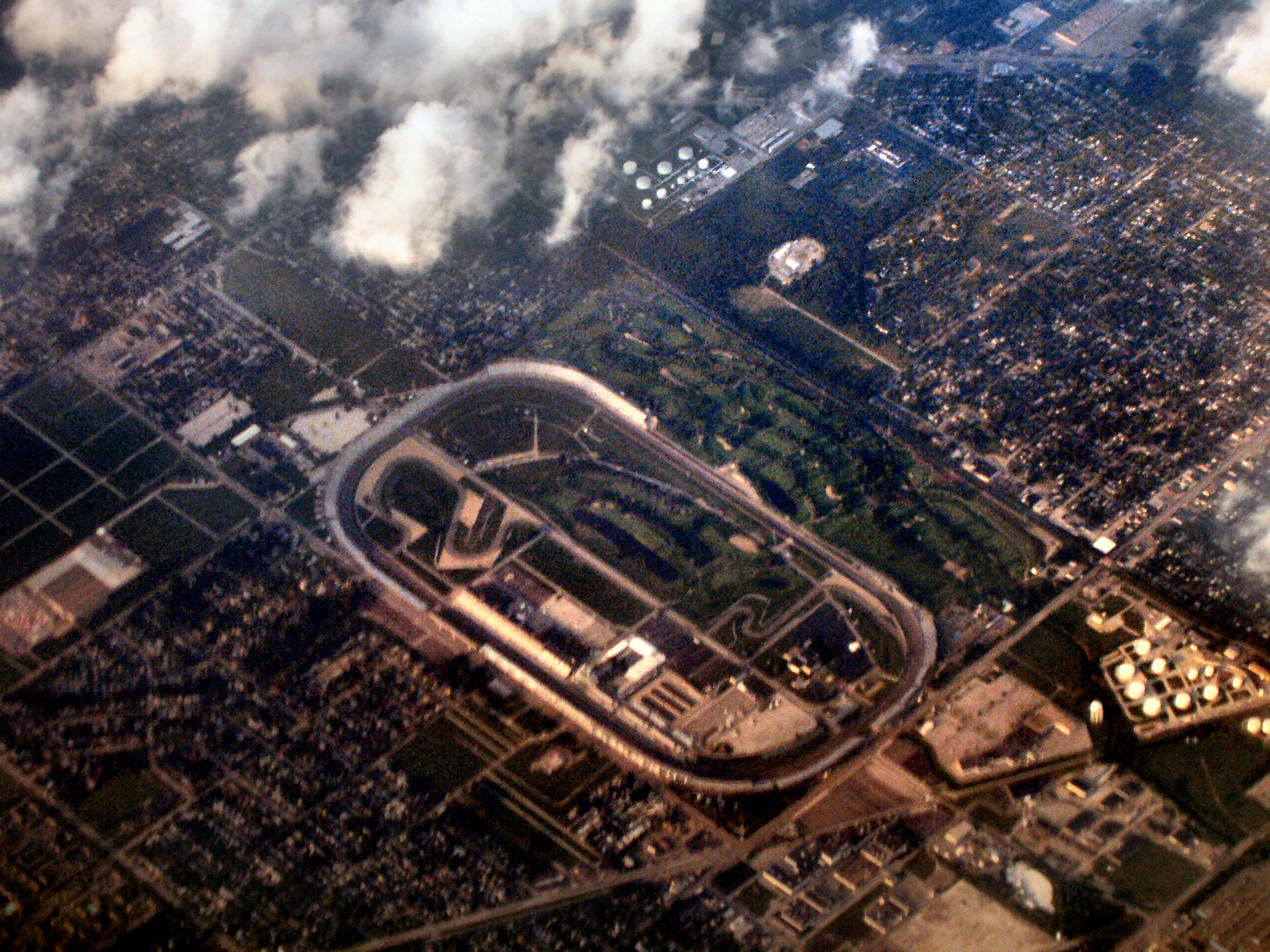
Indianapolis Motor Speedway, where the race was held

International Motor Sports Association (IMSA) president John Doonan confirmed the race was part of the 2025 IMSA SportsCar Championship (IMSA SCC) in March 2024. It was the third consecutive year the IMSA SCC hosted a race at Indianapolis Motor Speedway. The 2025 IMSA Battle on the Bricks was the tenth of eleven scheduled sports car races of 2025 by IMSA. The race was held at the fourteen-turn 2.439 mi (3.925 km) Indianapolis Motor Speedway road course on September 21, 2025.

=== Standings before the race ===
Preceding the event, Matt Campbell and Mathieu Jaminet led the GTP Drivers' Championship with 2314 points, 75 ahead of Porsche teammates Felipe Nasr and Nick Tandy. Dries Vanthoor and Philipp Eng sat in third, 181 points behind Campbell and Jaminet. The LMP2 Drivers' Championship was led by Dane Cameron and PJ Hyett with 1682 points, 107 points ahead of second-placed Daniel Goldburg. Felipe Fraga and Gar Robinson sat in third, a further 104 points behind. The GTD Pro Drivers' Championship saw Antonio Garcia and Alexander Sims leading with 2632 points, 53 points ahead of second-placed Albert Costa. Klaus Bachler and Laurin Heinrich sat in third, 191 points behind Garcia and Sims. In GTD, Philip Ellis and Russell Ward led the Drivers' Championship with 2529 points, 271 points ahead of second-placed Casper Stevenson. Kenton Koch sat in third place, a further 57 points behind. The Teams' Championships were led by Porsche Penske Motorsport, AO Racing, Corvette Racing by Pratt Miller Motorsports, and Winward Racing, respectively, whilst the Manufacturers' Championships were led by Porsche in GTP, Chevrolet in GTD Pro, and Mercedes-AMG in GTD.

== Entry list ==
The entry list was revealed on September 10, 2025, and featured 53 entries: 12 entries in GTP, 12 in LMP2, 11 in GTD Pro, and 18 entries in GTD.

No.	Entrant	Car	Driver 1	Driver 2	Driver 3
Grand Touring Prototype (GTP) (12 entries)
6	(Germany) Porsche Penske Motorsport	Porsche 963	(Australia) Matt Campbell	(France) Mathieu Jaminet	
7	(Germany) Porsche Penske Motorsport	Porsche 963	(Brazil) Felipe Nasr	(United Kingdom) Nick Tandy	
10	(United States) Cadillac Wayne Taylor Racing	Cadillac V-Series.R	(Portugal) Filipe Albuquerque	(United States) Ricky Taylor	
23	(United States) Aston Martin THOR Team	Aston Martin Valkyrie	(Canada) Roman De Angelis	(United Kingdom) Ross Gunn	
24	(United States) BMW M Team RLL	BMW M Hybrid V8	(Austria) Philipp Eng	(Belgium) Dries Vanthoor	
25	(United States) BMW M Team RLL	BMW M Hybrid V8	(South Africa) Sheldon van der Linde	(Germany) Marco Wittmann	
31	(United States) Cadillac Whelen	Cadillac V-Series.R	(United Kingdom) Jack Aitken	(New Zealand) Earl Bamber	(Denmark) Frederik Vesti
40	(United States) Cadillac Wayne Taylor Racing	Cadillac V-Series.R	(Switzerland) Louis Delétraz	(United States) Jordan Taylor	
60	(United States) Acura Meyer Shank Racing w/ Curb-Agajanian	Acura ARX-06	(United Kingdom) Tom Blomqvist	(United States) Colin Braun	
63	(Italy) Automobili Lamborghini Squadra Corse	Lamborghini SC63	(France) Romain Grosjean	(Switzerland) Edoardo Mortara	
85	(United States) JDC–Miller MotorSports	Porsche 963	(Netherlands) Tijmen van der Helm	(Switzerland) Nico Müller	
93	(United States) Acura Meyer Shank Racing w/ Curb-Agajanian	Acura ARX-06	(Japan) Kakunoshin Ohta	(United Kingdom) Nick Yelloly	(Netherlands) Renger van der Zande
Le Mans Prototype 2 (LMP2) (12 entries)
04	(Portugal) CrowdStrike Racing by APR	Oreca 07-Gibson	(Denmark) Malthe Jakobsen	(United States) George Kurtz	(United Kingdom) Toby Sowery
2	(United States) United Autosports USA	Oreca 07-Gibson	(United States) Nick Boulle	(United States) Juan Manuel Correa	(United Kingdom) Ben Hanley
8	(Canada) Tower Motorsports	Oreca 07-Gibson	(Mexico) Sebastián Álvarez	(France) Sébastien Bourdais	(Canada) John Farano
11	(France) TDS Racing	Oreca 07-Gibson	(New Zealand) Hunter McElrea	(Denmark) Mikkel Jensen	(United States) Steven Thomas
18	(United States) Era Motorsport	Oreca 07-Gibson	(Denmark) David Heinemeier Hansson	(United Kingdom) Oliver Jarvis	(Canada) Tobias Lütke
22	(United States) United Autosports USA	Oreca 07-Gibson	(United States) Dan Goldburg	(Sweden) Rasmus Lindh	(United Kingdom) Paul di Resta
43	(Poland) Inter Europol Competition	Oreca 07-Gibson	(United States) Jeremy Clarke	(France) Tom Dillmann	(United States) Bijoy Garg
52	(United States) PR1/Mathiasen Motorsports	Oreca 07-Gibson	(Denmark) Benjamin Pedersen	(United States) Naveen Rao	(United States) Logan Sargeant
73	(United States) Pratt Miller Motorsports	Oreca 07-Gibson	(Canada) Chris Cumming	(Brazil) Pietro Fittipaldi	(Republic of Ireland) James Roe
74	(United States) Riley	Oreca 07-Gibson	(Australia) Josh Burdon	(Brazil) Felipe Fraga	(United States) Gar Robinson
88	(Italy) AF Corse	Oreca 07-Gibson	(Argentina) Luis Pérez Companc	(Argentina) Matías Pérez Companc	(Denmark) Nicklas Nielsen
99	(United States) AO Racing	Oreca 07-Gibson	(United States) Dane Cameron	(United Kingdom) Jonny Edgar	(United States) P. J. Hyett
GT Daytona Pro (GTD Pro) (11 entries)
1	(United States) Paul Miller Racing	BMW M4 GT3 Evo	(United States) Connor De Phillippi	(United States) Madison Snow	(United States) Neil Verhagen
3	(United States) Corvette Racing by Pratt Miller Motorsports	Chevrolet Corvette Z06 GT3.R	(Spain) Antonio García	(United Kingdom) Alexander Sims	
4	(United States) Corvette Racing by Pratt Miller Motorsports	Chevrolet Corvette Z06 GT3.R	(Netherlands) Nicky Catsburg	(United States) Tommy Milner	
9	(Canada) Pfaff Motorsports	Lamborghini Huracán GT3 Evo 2	(Italy) Andrea Caldarelli	(Italy) Marco Mapelli	
14	(United States) Vasser Sullivan	Lexus RC F GT3	(United Kingdom) Ben Barnicoat	(United States) Aaron Telitz	
48	(United States) Paul Miller Racing	BMW M4 GT3 Evo	(United Kingdom) Dan Harper	(Germany) Max Hesse	
64	(Canada) Ford Multimatic Motorsports	Ford Mustang GT3	(Germany) Mike Rockenfeller	(United Kingdom) Sebastian Priaulx	
65	(Canada) Ford Multimatic Motorsports	Ford Mustang GT3	(Germany) Christopher Mies	(Belgium) Frédéric Vervisch	
75	(Australia) 75 Express	Mercedes-AMG GT3 Evo	(Australia) Broc Feeney	(Canada) Mikaël Grenier	(Australia) Kenny Habul
77	(United States) AO Racing	Porsche 911 GT3 R (992)	(Austria) Klaus Bachler	(Germany) Laurin Heinrich	
81	(United States) DragonSpeed	Ferrari 296 GT3	(Spain) Albert Costa	(Italy) Davide Rigon	
GT Daytona (GTD) (18 entries)
021	(United States) Triarsi Competizione	Ferrari 296 GT3	(United States) Joel Miller	(United States) AJ Muss	(Italy) Niccolò Schirò
023	(United States) Triarsi Competizione	Ferrari 296 GT3	(United Kingdom) James Calado	(United States) Kenton Koch	(United States) Onofrio Triarsi
12	(United States) Vasser Sullivan	Lexus RC F GT3	(United Kingdom) Jack Hawksworth	(United States) Frankie Montecalvo	(Canada) Parker Thompson
13	(Canada) AWA	Chevrolet Corvette Z06 GT3.R	(United Kingdom) Matt Bell	(Canada) Orey Fidani	(Germany) Lars Kern
19	(United States) van der Steur Racing	Aston Martin Vantage AMR GT3 Evo	(Brazil) Eduardo Barrichello	(France) Valentin Hasse-Clot	(United States) Anthony McIntosh
21	(Italy) AF Corse	Ferrari 296 GT3	(United States) Simon Mann	(Italy) Alessandro Pier Guidi	(France) Lilou Wadoux
27	(United States) Heart of Racing Team	Aston Martin Vantage AMR GT3 Evo	(United Kingdom) Tom Gamble	(Canada) Zacharie Robichon	(United Kingdom) Casper Stevenson
34	(United States) Conquest Racing	Ferrari 296 GT3	(United States) Manny Franco	(Brazil) Daniel Serra	(United Kingdom) Ben Tuck
36	(United States) DXDT Racing	Chevrolet Corvette Z06 GT3.R	(Republic of Ireland) Charlie Eastwood	(United States) Alec Udell	(Turkey) Salih Yoluç
45	(United States) Wayne Taylor Racing with Andretti	Lamborghini Huracán GT3 Evo 2	(United States) Graham Doyle	(Costa Rica) Danny Formal	(United States) Trent Hindman
47	(Italy) Cetilar Racing	Ferrari 296 GT3	(Italy) Antonio Fuoco	(Italy) Nicola Lacorte	(Italy) Lorenzo Patrese
57	(United States) Winward Racing	Mercedes-AMG GT3 Evo	(Netherlands) Indy Dontje	(Switzerland) Philip Ellis	(United States) Russell Ward
66	(United States) Gradient Racing	Ford Mustang GT3	(United Kingdom) Till Bechtolsheimer	(United States) Mason Filippi	(United States) Joey Hand
70	(United Kingdom) Inception Racing	Ferrari 296 GT3	(United States) Brendan Iribe	(United Kingdom) Ollie Millroy	(Denmark) Frederik Schandorff
78	(United States) Forte Racing	Lamborghini Huracán GT3 Evo 2	(Germany) Mario Farnbacher	(United States) Eric Filgueiras	(Canada) Misha Goikhberg
80	(United States) Lone Star Racing	Mercedes-AMG GT3 Evo	(Australia) Scott Andrews	(United States) Wyatt Brichacek	(Netherlands) Lin Hodenius
96	(United States) Turner Motorsport	BMW M4 GT3 Evo	(United States) Robby Foley	(United States) Patrick Gallagher	(United States) Jake Walker
120	(United States) Wright Motorsports	Porsche 911 GT3 R (992)	(United States) Adam Adelson	(Australia) Tom Sargent	(United States) Elliott Skeer

== Qualifying ==
Saturday's afternoon qualifying was broken into four sessions, with one session for the GTP, LMP2, GTD Pro, and GTD classes each. The rules dictated that all teams nominated a driver to qualify their cars, with the Pro-Am LMP2 class requiring a Bronze rated driver to qualify the car. The competitors' fastest lap times determined the starting order. The competitors' fastest lap times determined the starting order. IMSA then arranged the grid to put GTPs ahead of the LMP2, GTD Pro, and GTD cars.

=== Qualifying results ===
Pole positions in each class are indicated in bold and with ‡.

Pos.	Class	No.	Entry	Driver	Time	Gap	Grid
1	GTP	60	(United States) Acura Meyer Shank Racing w/ Curb-Agajanian	(United Kingdom) Tom Blomqvist	1:14.569	—	12^{1}
2	**GTP**	**31**	**(United States) Cadillac Whelen**	**(United Kingdom) Jack Aitken**	**1:14.610**	**+0.041**	1‡
3	GTP	40	(United States) Cadillac Wayne Taylor Racing	(Switzerland) Louis Delétraz	1:14.715	+0.146	2
4	GTP	10	(United States) Cadillac Wayne Taylor Racing	(United States) Ricky Taylor	1:14.804	+0.235	3
5	GTP	6	(Germany) Porsche Penske Motorsport	(Australia) Matt Campbell	1:14.910	+0.341	4
6	GTP	93	(United States) Acura Meyer Shank Racing w/ Curb-Agajanian	(United Kingdom) Nick Yelloly	1:15.005	+0.436	5
7	GTP	25	(United States) BMW M Team RLL	(South Africa) Sheldon van der Linde	1:15.125	+0.556	6
8	GTP	24	(United States) BMW M Team RLL	(Belgium) Dries Vanthoor	1:15.133	+0.564	7
9	GTP	63	(Italy) Automobili Lamborghini Squadra Corse	(France) Romain Grosjean	1:15.170	+0.601	8
10	GTP	7	(Germany) Porsche Penske Motorsport	(Brazil) Felipe Nasr	1:15.185	+0.616	9
11	GTP	23	(United States) Aston Martin THOR Team	(Canada) Roman De Angelis	1:15.434	+0.865	10
12	GTP	85	(United States) JDC–Miller MotorSports	(Switzerland) Nico Müller	1:15.566	+0.997	11
13	**LMP2**	**2**	**(United States) United Autosports USA**	**(United States) Nick Boulle**	**1:17.846**	**+3.277**	13‡
14	LMP2	22	(United States) United Autosports USA	(United States) Dan Goldburg	1:18.222	+3.653	14
15	LMP2	99	(United States) AO Racing	(United States) P. J. Hyett	1:18.364	+3.795	15
16	LMP2	43	(Poland) Inter Europol Competition	(United States) Jeremy Clarke	1:18.573	+4.004	16
17	LMP2	11	(France) TDS Racing	(United States) Steven Thomas	1:18.724	+4.155	17
18	LMP2	18	(United States) Era Motorsport	(Canada) Tobias Lütke	1:18.787	+4.218	18
19	LMP2	88	(Italy) AF Corse	(Argentina) Luis Pérez Companc	1:18.821	+4.252	19
20	LMP2	52	(United States) PR1/Mathiasen Motorsports	(United States) Naveen Rao	1:19.085	+4.516	20
21	LMP2	04	(Portugal) CrowdStrike Racing by APR	(United States) George Kurtz	1:19.101	+4.532	21
22	LMP2	8	(Canada) Tower Motorsports	(Canada) John Farano	1:19.720	+5.151	22
23	LMP2	74	(United States) Riley	(United States) Gar Robinson	1:19.966	+5.397	23
24	**GTD**	**27**	**(United States) Heart of Racing Team**	**(United Kingdom) Casper Stevenson**	**1:23.088**	**+8.519**	36‡
25	**GTD Pro**	**48**	**(United States) Paul Miller Racing**	**(United Kingdom) Dan Harper**	**1:23.259**	**+8.690**	25‡
26	GTD	21	(Italy) AF Corse	(France) Lilou Wadoux	1:23.282	+8.713	37
27	GTD Pro	65	(Canada) Ford Multimatic Motorsports	(Germany) Christopher Mies	1:23.445	+8.876	26
28	GTD Pro	75	(Australia) 75 Express	(Canada) Mikaël Grenier	1:23.487	+8.918	35^{2}
29	GTD Pro	3	(United States) Corvette Racing by Pratt Miller Motorsports	(United Kingdom) Alexander Sims	1:23.510	+8.941	27
30	GTD Pro	9	(Canada) Pfaff Motorsports	(Italy) Andrea Caldarelli	1:23.559	+8.990	28
31	GTD Pro	77	(United States) AO Racing	(Germany) Laurin Heinrich	1:23.559	+8.990	29
32	GTD	80	(United States) Lone Star Racing	(Netherlands) Lin Hodenius	1:23.570	+9.001	38
33	GTD	57	(United States) Winward Racing	(United States) Russell Ward	1:23.614	+9.045	39
34	GTD Pro	81	(United States) DragonSpeed	(Spain) Albert Costa	1:23.618	+9.049	30
35	GTD Pro	64	(Canada) Ford Multimatic Motorsports	(Germany) Mike Rockenfeller	1:23.678	+9.109	31
36	GTD	34	(United States) Conquest Racing	(United States) Manny Franco	1:23.730	+9.161	40
37	GTD	47	(Italy) Cetilar Racing	(Italy) Nicola Lacorte	1:23.801	+9.232	41
38	GTD Pro	1	(United States) Paul Miller Racing	(United States) Madison Snow	1:23.807	+9.238	32
39	GTD	36	(United States) DXDT Racing	(United States) Alec Udell	1:23.877	+9.308	42
40	GTD Pro	4	(United States) Corvette Racing by Pratt Miller Motorsports	(United States) Tommy Milner	1:23.882	+9.313	33
41	GTD	023	(United States) Triarsi Competizione	(United States) Onofrio Triarsi	1:23.931	+9.362	43
42	GTD Pro	14	(United States) Vasser Sullivan	(United States) Aaron Telitz	1:24.062	+9.493	34
43	GTD	19	(United States) van der Steur Racing	(United States) Anthony McIntosh	1:24.319	+9.750	44
44	GTD	12	(United States) Vasser Sullivan	(United States) Frankie Montecalvo	1:24.388	+9.819	45
45	GTD	021	(United States) Triarsi Competizione	(United States) AJ Muss	1:24.457	+9.888	46
46	GTD	78	(United States) Forte Racing	(Canada) Misha Goikhberg	1:24.629	+10.060	47
47	GTD	120	(United States) Wright Motorsports	(United States) Adam Adelson	1:24.660	+10.091	48
48	GTD	96	(United States) Turner Motorsport	(United States) Jake Walker	1:24.722	+10.153	49
49	GTD	70	(United Kingdom) Inception Racing	(United States) Brendan Iribe	1:24.744	+10.175	50
50	GTD	13	(Canada) AWA	(Canada) Orey Fidani	1:25.027	+10.458	51
51	GTD	66	(United States) Gradient Racing	(United Kingdom) Till Bechtolsheimer	1:25.437	+10.868	52
52	GTD	45	(United States) Wayne Taylor Racing with Andretti	(United States) Graham Doyle	1:25.571	+11.002	53
53	LMP2	73	(United States) Pratt Miller Motorsports	(Canada) Chris Cumming	No Time Established		24
Sources:

- ^{1} The No. 60 MSR Acura was moved to the back of the GTP classification for failing to comply with bodywork tolerances.
- ^{2} The No. 75 Mercedes-AMG was moved to the back of the GTD Pro classification for violating minimum ground clearance.

== Race ==
=== Post-race ===
The final results of GTP allowed Campbell and Jaminet to extend their advantage in the Drivers' Championship by 56 points over teammates Nasr and Tandy. Cameron and Hyett's fifth-place finish allowed them to keep their advantage over Goldburg in the LMP2 Drivers' Championship. The final results in GTD Pro meant García and Sims advantage in the GTD Pro Drivers' Championship was reduced by 35 points over second-place finisher Costa. Ellis and Ward's fifth-place finish allowed them to keep their advantage over Stevenson in the GTD Drivers' Championship. Porsche Penske Motorsport, AO Racing, Corvette Racing by Pratt Miller Motorsports, and Winward Racing continued to top their respective Teams' Championships. Porsche, Chevrolet, and Mercedes-AMG continued to their Manufacturers' Championship with 1 round remaining in the season.

Class winners are in bold and ‡.

Pos	Class	No	Team	Drivers	Chassis	Laps	Time/Retired
Pos	Class	No	Team	Drivers	Engine	Laps	Time/Retired
1	**GTP**	**31**	**(United States) Cadillac Whelen**	**(United Kingdom) Jack Aitken** **(New Zealand) Earl Bamber** **(Denmark) Frederik Vesti**	**Cadillac V-Series.R**	**243**	**6:00:41.285‡**
1	**GTP**	**31**	**(United States) Cadillac Whelen**	**(United Kingdom) Jack Aitken** **(New Zealand) Earl Bamber** **(Denmark) Frederik Vesti**	**Cadillac LMC55R 5.5 L V8**	**243**	**6:00:41.285‡**
2	GTP	10	(United States) Cadillac Wayne Taylor Racing	(United States) Ricky Taylor (Portugal) Filipe Albuquerque	Cadillac V-Series.R	243	+0.988
2	GTP	10	(United States) Cadillac Wayne Taylor Racing	(United States) Ricky Taylor (Portugal) Filipe Albuquerque	Cadillac LMC55R 5.5 L V8	243	+0.988
3	GTP	60	(United States) Acura Meyer Shank Racing w/ Curb-Agajanian	(United Kingdom) Tom Blomqvist (United States) Colin Braun	Acura ARX-06	243	+1.952
3	GTP	60	(United States) Acura Meyer Shank Racing w/ Curb-Agajanian	(United Kingdom) Tom Blomqvist (United States) Colin Braun	Acura AR24e 2.4 L turbo V6	243	+1.952
4	GTP	24	(United States) BMW M Team RLL	(Austria) Philipp Eng (Belgium) Dries Vanthoor	BMW M Hybrid V8	243	+2.684
4	GTP	24	(United States) BMW M Team RLL	(Austria) Philipp Eng (Belgium) Dries Vanthoor	BMW P66/3 4.0 L turbo V8	243	+2.684
5	GTP	93	(United States) Acura Meyer Shank Racing w/ Curb-Agajanian	(Japan) Kakunoshin Ohta (Netherlands) Renger van der Zande (United Kingdom) Nick Yelloly	Acura ARX-06	243	+3.888
5	GTP	93	(United States) Acura Meyer Shank Racing w/ Curb-Agajanian	(Japan) Kakunoshin Ohta (Netherlands) Renger van der Zande (United Kingdom) Nick Yelloly	Acura AR24e 2.4 L turbo V6	243	+3.888
6	GTP	25	(United States) BMW M Team RLL	(Germany) Marco Wittmann (South Africa) Sheldon van der Linde	BMW M Hybrid V8	243	+4.157
6	GTP	25	(United States) BMW M Team RLL	(Germany) Marco Wittmann (South Africa) Sheldon van der Linde	BMW P66/3 4.0 L turbo V8	243	+4.157
7	GTP	6	(Germany) Porsche Penske Motorsport	(France) Mathieu Jaminet (Australia) Matt Campbell	Porsche 963	243	+4.671
7	GTP	6	(Germany) Porsche Penske Motorsport	(France) Mathieu Jaminet (Australia) Matt Campbell	Porsche 9RD 4.6 L turbo V8	243	+4.671
8	GTP	85	(United States) JDC–Miller MotorSports	(Netherlands) Tijmen van der Helm (Switzerland) Nico Müller	Porsche 963	243	+6.046
8	GTP	85	(United States) JDC–Miller MotorSports	(Netherlands) Tijmen van der Helm (Switzerland) Nico Müller	Porsche 9RD 4.6 L turbo V8	243	+6.046
9	GTP	40	(United States) Cadillac Wayne Taylor Racing	(United States) Jordan Taylor (Switzerland) Louis Delétraz	Cadillac V-Series.R	243	+6.943
9	GTP	40	(United States) Cadillac Wayne Taylor Racing	(United States) Jordan Taylor (Switzerland) Louis Delétraz	Cadillac LMC55R 5.5 L V8	243	+6.943
10	GTP	63	(Italy) Automobili Lamborghini Squadra Corse	(France) Romain Grosjean (Switzerland) Edoardo Mortara	Lamborghini SC63	243	+7.260
10	GTP	63	(Italy) Automobili Lamborghini Squadra Corse	(France) Romain Grosjean (Switzerland) Edoardo Mortara	Lamborghini 3.8 L turbo V8	243	+7.260
11	GTP	23	(United States) Aston Martin THOR Team	(United Kingdom) Ross Gunn (Canada) Roman De Angelis	Aston Martin Valkyrie	243	+7.847
11	GTP	23	(United States) Aston Martin THOR Team	(United Kingdom) Ross Gunn (Canada) Roman De Angelis	Aston Martin RA 6.5 L V12	243	+7.847
12	GTP	7	(Germany) Porsche Penske Motorsport	(Brazil) Felipe Nasr (United Kingdom) Nick Tandy	Porsche 963	242	+1 Lap
12	GTP	7	(Germany) Porsche Penske Motorsport	(Brazil) Felipe Nasr (United Kingdom) Nick Tandy	Porsche 9RD 4.6 L turbo V8	242	+1 Lap
13	**LMP2**	**11**	**(France) TDS Racing**	**(United States) Steven Thomas** **(New Zealand) Hunter McElrea** **(Denmark) Mikkel Jensen**	**Oreca 07**	**241**	**+2 Laps‡**
13	**LMP2**	**11**	**(France) TDS Racing**	**(United States) Steven Thomas** **(New Zealand) Hunter McElrea** **(Denmark) Mikkel Jensen**	**Gibson GK428 4.2 L V8**	**241**	**+2 Laps‡**
14	LMP2	43	(Poland) Inter Europol Competition	(United States) Jeremy Clarke (France) Tom Dillmann (United States) Bijoy Garg	Oreca 07	241	+2 Laps
14	LMP2	43	(Poland) Inter Europol Competition	(United States) Jeremy Clarke (France) Tom Dillmann (United States) Bijoy Garg	Gibson GK428 4.2 L V8	241	+2 Laps
15	LMP2	74	(United States) Riley	(Australia) Josh Burdon (United States) Gar Robinson (Brazil) Felipe Fraga	Oreca 07	241	+2 Laps
15	LMP2	74	(United States) Riley	(Australia) Josh Burdon (United States) Gar Robinson (Brazil) Felipe Fraga	Gibson GK428 4.2 L V8	241	+2 Laps
16	LMP2	22	(United States) United Autosports USA	(United States) Dan Goldburg (Sweden) Rasmus Lindh (United Kingdom) Paul di Resta	Oreca 07	241	+2 Laps
16	LMP2	22	(United States) United Autosports USA	(United States) Dan Goldburg (Sweden) Rasmus Lindh (United Kingdom) Paul di Resta	Gibson GK428 4.2 L V8	241	+2 Laps
17	LMP2	99	(United States) AO Racing	(United States) Dane Cameron (United Kingdom) Jonny Edgar (United States) P. J. Hyett	Oreca 07	241	+2 Laps
17	LMP2	99	(United States) AO Racing	(United States) Dane Cameron (United Kingdom) Jonny Edgar (United States) P. J. Hyett	Gibson GK428 4.2 L V8	241	+2 Laps
18	LMP2	2	(United States) United Autosports USA	(United States) Nick Boulle (United States) Juan Manuel Correa (United Kingdom) Ben Hanley	Oreca 07	240	+3 Laps
18	LMP2	2	(United States) United Autosports USA	(United States) Nick Boulle (United States) Juan Manuel Correa (United Kingdom) Ben Hanley	Gibson GK428 4.2 L V8	240	+3 Laps
19	LMP2	8	(Canada) Tower Motorsports	(Mexico) Sebastián Álvarez (France) Sébastien Bourdais (Canada) John Farano	Oreca 07	240	+3 Laps
19	LMP2	8	(Canada) Tower Motorsports	(Mexico) Sebastián Álvarez (France) Sébastien Bourdais (Canada) John Farano	Gibson GK428 4.2 L V8	240	+3 Laps
20	LMP2	52	(United States) PR1/Mathiasen Motorsports	(Denmark) Benjamin Pedersen (United States) Naveen Rao (United States) Logan Sargeant	Oreca 07	240	+3 Laps
20	LMP2	52	(United States) PR1/Mathiasen Motorsports	(Denmark) Benjamin Pedersen (United States) Naveen Rao (United States) Logan Sargeant	Gibson GK428 4.2 L V8	240	+3 Laps
21	LMP2	73	(United States) Pratt Miller Motorsports	(Canada) Chris Cumming (Brazil) Pietro Fittipaldi (Republic of Ireland) James Roe	Oreca 07	236	+7 Laps
21	LMP2	73	(United States) Pratt Miller Motorsports	(Canada) Chris Cumming (Brazil) Pietro Fittipaldi (Republic of Ireland) James Roe	Gibson GK428 4.2 L V8	236	+7 Laps
22 DNF	LMP2	04	(Portugal) CrowdStrike Racing by APR	(Denmark) Malthe Jakobsen (United States) George Kurtz (United Kingdom) Toby Sowery	Oreca 07	234	Accident
22 DNF	LMP2	04	(Portugal) CrowdStrike Racing by APR	(Denmark) Malthe Jakobsen (United States) George Kurtz (United Kingdom) Toby Sowery	Gibson GK428 4.2 L V8	234	Accident
23	**GTD Pro**	**64**	**(Canada) Ford Multimatic Motorsports**	**(Germany) Mike Rockenfeller** **(United Kingdom) Sebastian Priaulx**	**Ford Mustang GT3**	**231**	**+12 Laps‡**
23	**GTD Pro**	**64**	**(Canada) Ford Multimatic Motorsports**	**(Germany) Mike Rockenfeller** **(United Kingdom) Sebastian Priaulx**	**Ford Coyote 5.4 L V8**	**231**	**+12 Laps‡**
24	GTD Pro	81	(United States) DragonSpeed	(Spain) Albert Costa (Italy) Davide Rigon	Ferrari 296 GT3	231	+12 Laps
24	GTD Pro	81	(United States) DragonSpeed	(Spain) Albert Costa (Italy) Davide Rigon	Ferrari F163CE 3.0 L Turbo V6	231	+12 Laps
25	GTD Pro	48	(United States) Paul Miller Racing	(Germany) Max Hesse (United Kingdom) Dan Harper	BMW M4 GT3 Evo	231	+12 Laps
25	GTD Pro	48	(United States) Paul Miller Racing	(Germany) Max Hesse (United Kingdom) Dan Harper	BMW P58 3.0 L Turbo I6	231	+12 Laps
26	GTD Pro	3	(United States) Corvette Racing by Pratt Miller Motorsports	(Spain) Antonio García (United Kingdom) Alexander Sims	Chevrolet Corvette Z06 GT3.R	231	+12 Laps
26	GTD Pro	3	(United States) Corvette Racing by Pratt Miller Motorsports	(Spain) Antonio García (United Kingdom) Alexander Sims	Chevrolet LT6 5.5 L V8	231	+12 Laps
27	GTD Pro	14	(United States) Vasser Sullivan Racing	(United Kingdom) Ben Barnicoat (United States) Aaron Telitz	Lexus RC F GT3	231	+12 Laps
27	GTD Pro	14	(United States) Vasser Sullivan Racing	(United Kingdom) Ben Barnicoat (United States) Aaron Telitz	Toyota 2UR-GSE 5.4 L V8	231	+12 Laps
28	GTD Pro	4	(United States) Corvette Racing by Pratt Miller Motorsports	(United States) Tommy Milner (Netherlands) Nicky Catsburg	Chevrolet Corvette Z06 GT3.R	231	+12 Laps
28	GTD Pro	4	(United States) Corvette Racing by Pratt Miller Motorsports	(United States) Tommy Milner (Netherlands) Nicky Catsburg	Chevrolet LT6 5.5 L V8	231	+12 Laps
29	GTD Pro	77	(United States) AO Racing	(Germany) Laurin Heinrich (Austria) Klaus Bachler	Porsche 911 GT3 R (992)	231	+12 Laps
29	GTD Pro	77	(United States) AO Racing	(Germany) Laurin Heinrich (Austria) Klaus Bachler	Porsche M97/80 4.2 L Flat-6	231	+12 Laps
30	GTD Pro	1	(United States) Paul Miller Racing	(United States) Connor De Phillippi (United States) Madison Snow (United States) Neil Verhagen	BMW M4 GT3 Evo	231	+12 Laps
30	GTD Pro	1	(United States) Paul Miller Racing	(United States) Connor De Phillippi (United States) Madison Snow (United States) Neil Verhagen	BMW P58 3.0 L Turbo I6	231	+12 Laps
31	GTD Pro	9	(Canada) Pfaff Motorsports	(Italy) Andrea Caldarelli (Italy) Marco Mapelli	Lamborghini Huracán GT3 Evo 2	230	+13 Laps
31	GTD Pro	9	(Canada) Pfaff Motorsports	(Italy) Andrea Caldarelli (Italy) Marco Mapelli	Lamborghini DGF 5.2 L V10	230	+13 Laps
32	**GTD**	**70**	**(United Kingdom) Inception Racing**	**(United States) Brendan Iribe** **(United Kingdom) Ollie Millroy** **(Denmark) Frederik Schandorff**	**Ferrari 296 GT3**	**230**	**+13 Laps‡**
32	**GTD**	**70**	**(United Kingdom) Inception Racing**	**(United States) Brendan Iribe** **(United Kingdom) Ollie Millroy** **(Denmark) Frederik Schandorff**	**Ferrari F163CE 3.0 L Turbo V6**	**230**	**+13 Laps‡**
33	GTD	120	(United States) Wright Motorsports	(United States) Adam Adelson (Australia) Tom Sargent (United States) Elliott Skeer	Porsche 911 GT3 R (992)	230	+13 Laps
33	GTD	120	(United States) Wright Motorsports	(United States) Adam Adelson (Australia) Tom Sargent (United States) Elliott Skeer	Porsche M97/80 4.2 L Flat-6	230	+13 Laps
34	GTD	34	(United States) Conquest Racing	(United States) Manny Franco (Brazil) Daniel Serra (United Kingdom) Ben Tuck	Ferrari 296 GT3	230	+13 Laps
34	GTD	34	(United States) Conquest Racing	(United States) Manny Franco (Brazil) Daniel Serra (United Kingdom) Ben Tuck	Ferrari F163CE 3.0 L Turbo V6	230	+13 Laps
35	GTD	96	(United States) Turner Motorsport	(United States) Robby Foley (United States) Patrick Gallagher (United States) Jake Walker	BMW M4 GT3 Evo	230	+13 Laps
35	GTD	96	(United States) Turner Motorsport	(United States) Robby Foley (United States) Patrick Gallagher (United States) Jake Walker	BMW P58 3.0 L Turbo I6	230	+13 Laps
36	GTD	57	(United States) Winward Racing	(Netherlands) Indy Dontje (Switzerland) Philip Ellis (United States) Russell Ward	Mercedes-AMG GT3 Evo	230	+13 Laps
36	GTD	57	(United States) Winward Racing	(Netherlands) Indy Dontje (Switzerland) Philip Ellis (United States) Russell Ward	Mercedes-Benz M159 6.2 L V8	230	+13 Laps
37	GTD	13	(Canada) AWA	(United Kingdom) Matt Bell (Canada) Orey Fidani (Germany) Lars Kern	Chevrolet Corvette Z06 GT3.R	230	+13 Laps
37	GTD	13	(Canada) AWA	(United Kingdom) Matt Bell (Canada) Orey Fidani (Germany) Lars Kern	Chevrolet LT6 5.5 L V8	230	+13 Laps
38	GTD	023	(United States) Triarsi Competizione	(United Kingdom) James Calado (United States) Kenton Koch (United States) Onofrio Triarsi	Ferrari 296 GT3	230	+13 Laps
38	GTD	023	(United States) Triarsi Competizione	(United Kingdom) James Calado (United States) Kenton Koch (United States) Onofrio Triarsi	Ferrari F163CE 3.0 L Turbo V6	230	+13 Laps
39	GTD	021	(United States) Triarsi Competizione	(United States) Joel Miller (United States) AJ Muss (Italy) Niccolò Schirò	Ferrari 296 GT3	230	+13 Laps
39	GTD	021	(United States) Triarsi Competizione	(United States) Joel Miller (United States) AJ Muss (Italy) Niccolò Schirò	Ferrari F163CE 3.0 L Turbo V6	230	+13 Laps
40	GTD	12	(United States) Vasser Sullivan Racing	(United Kingdom) Jack Hawksworth (United States) Frankie Montecalvo (Canada) Parker Thompson	Lexus RC F GT3	230	+13 Laps
40	GTD	12	(United States) Vasser Sullivan Racing	(United Kingdom) Jack Hawksworth (United States) Frankie Montecalvo (Canada) Parker Thompson	Toyota 2UR-GSE 5.4 L V8	230	+13 Laps
41	GTD	66	(United States) Gradient Racing	(United Kingdom) Till Bechtolsheimer (United States) Mason Filippi (United States) Joey Hand	Ford Mustang GT3	229	+14 Laps
41	GTD	66	(United States) Gradient Racing	(United Kingdom) Till Bechtolsheimer (United States) Mason Filippi (United States) Joey Hand	Ford Coyote 5.4 L V8	229	+14 Laps
42	GTD	27	(United States) Heart of Racing Team	(United Kingdom) Tom Gamble (Canada) Zacharie Robichon (United Kingdom) Casper Stevenson	Aston Martin Vantage AMR GT3 Evo	229	+14 Laps
42	GTD	27	(United States) Heart of Racing Team	(United Kingdom) Tom Gamble (Canada) Zacharie Robichon (United Kingdom) Casper Stevenson	Aston Martin M177 4.0 L Turbo V8	229	+14 Laps
43	GTD	47	(Italy) Cetilar Racing	(Italy) Antonio Fuoco (Italy) Nicola Lacorte (Italy) Lorenzo Patrese	Ferrari 296 GT3	219	+24 Laps
43	GTD	47	(Italy) Cetilar Racing	(Italy) Antonio Fuoco (Italy) Nicola Lacorte (Italy) Lorenzo Patrese	Ferrari F163CE 3.0 L Turbo V6	219	+24 Laps
44	GTD	78	(United States) Forte Racing	(Germany) Mario Farnbacher (United States) Eric Filgueiras (Canada) Misha Goikhberg	Lamborghini Huracán GT3 Evo 2	214	+29 Laps
44	GTD	78	(United States) Forte Racing	(Germany) Mario Farnbacher (United States) Eric Filgueiras (Canada) Misha Goikhberg	Lamborghini DGF 5.2 L V10	214	+29 Laps
45 DNF	GTD	45	(United States) Wayne Taylor Racing	(United States) Graham Doyle (Costa Rica) Danny Formal (United States) Trent Hindman	Lamborghini Huracán GT3 Evo 2	184	Differential
45 DNF	GTD	45	(United States) Wayne Taylor Racing	(United States) Graham Doyle (Costa Rica) Danny Formal (United States) Trent Hindman	Lamborghini DGF 5.2 L V10	184	Differential
46 DNF	GTD Pro	65	(Canada) Ford Multimatic Motorsports	(Germany) Christopher Mies (Belgium) Frédéric Vervisch	Ford Mustang GT3	180	Contact
46 DNF	GTD Pro	65	(Canada) Ford Multimatic Motorsports	(Germany) Christopher Mies (Belgium) Frédéric Vervisch	Ford Coyote 5.4 L V8	180	Contact
47 DNF	LMP2	88	(Italy) AF Corse	(Argentina) Luis Pérez Companc (Argentina) Matías Pérez Companc (Denmark) Nicklas Nielsen	Oreca 07	124	Contact
47 DNF	LMP2	88	(Italy) AF Corse	(Argentina) Luis Pérez Companc (Argentina) Matías Pérez Companc (Denmark) Nicklas Nielsen	Gibson GK428 4.2 L V8	124	Contact
48 DNF	GTD	75	(Australia) 75 Express	(Australia) Broc Feeney (Canada) Mikaël Grenier (Australia) Kenny Habul	Mercedes-AMG GT3 Evo	123	Gearbox
48 DNF	GTD	75	(Australia) 75 Express	(Australia) Broc Feeney (Canada) Mikaël Grenier (Australia) Kenny Habul	Mercedes-Benz M159 6.2 L V8	123	Gearbox
49 DNF	LMP2	18	(United States) Era Motorsport	(Denmark) David Heinemeier Hansson (United Kingdom) Oliver Jarvis (Canada) Tobias Lütke	Oreca 07	119	Engine
49 DNF	LMP2	18	(United States) Era Motorsport	(Denmark) David Heinemeier Hansson (United Kingdom) Oliver Jarvis (Canada) Tobias Lütke	Gibson GK428 4.2 L V8	119	Engine
50 DNF	GTD	19	(United States) van der Steur Racing	(Brazil) Eduardo Barrichello (France) Valentin Hasse-Clot (United States) Anthony McIntosh	Aston Martin Vantage AMR GT3 Evo	109	Gearbox
50 DNF	GTD	19	(United States) van der Steur Racing	(Brazil) Eduardo Barrichello (France) Valentin Hasse-Clot (United States) Anthony McIntosh	Aston Martin M177 4.0 L Turbo V8	109	Gearbox
51 DNF	GTD	80	(United States) Lone Star Racing	(Australia) Scott Andrews (United States) Wyatt Brichacek (Netherlands) Lin Hodenius	Mercedes-AMG GT3 Evo	99	Rear wheel
51 DNF	GTD	80	(United States) Lone Star Racing	(Australia) Scott Andrews (United States) Wyatt Brichacek (Netherlands) Lin Hodenius	Mercedes-Benz M159 6.2 L V8	99	Rear wheel
52 DNF	GTD	36	(United States) DXDT Racing	(Canada) Robert Wickens (United States) Alec Udell	Chevrolet Corvette Z06 GT3.R	52	Accident
52 DNF	GTD	36	(United States) DXDT Racing	(Canada) Robert Wickens (United States) Alec Udell	Chevrolet LT6 5.5 L V8	52	Accident
53 DNF	GTD	21	(Italy) AF Corse	(United States) Simon Mann (Italy) Alessandro Pier Guidi (France) Lilou Wadoux	Ferrari 296 GT3	26	Power loss
53 DNF	GTD	21	(Italy) AF Corse	(United States) Simon Mann (Italy) Alessandro Pier Guidi (France) Lilou Wadoux	Ferrari F163CE 3.0 L Turbo V6	26	Power loss

== Standings after the race ==
GTP Drivers' Championship standings
Pos.	+/–	Driver	Points
1		(France) Mathieu Jaminet (Australia) Matt Campbell	2582
2		(Brazil) Felipe Nasr (United Kingdom) Nick Tandy	2451
3		(Austria) Philipp Eng (Belgium) Dries Vanthoor	2437
4		(United Kingdom) Nick Yelloly (Netherlands) Renger van der Zande	2387
5		(Portugal) Filipe Albuquerque (United States) Ricky Taylor	2353

LMP2 Drivers' Championship standings
Pos.	+/–	Driver	Points
1		(United States) Dane Cameron (United States) P. J. Hyett	1972
2		(United States) Dan Goldburg	1887
3		(Brazil) Felipe Fraga (United States) Gar Robinson	1791
4		(United States) Steven Thomas	1785
5	1	(United Kingdom) Ben Hanley	1651

GTD Pro Drivers' Championship standings
Pos.	+/–	Driver	Points
1		(Spain) Antonio García (United Kingdom) Alexander Sims	2942
2		(Spain) Albert Costa	2924
3	1	(United Kingdom) Sebastian Priaulx (Germany) Mike Rockenfeller	2773
4	1	(Austria) Klaus Bachler (Germany) Laurin Heinrich	2707
5	2	(United Kingdom) Dan Harper (Germany) Max Hesse	2599

GTD Drivers' Championship standings
Pos.	+/–	Driver	Points
1		(Switzerland) Philip Ellis (United States) Russell Ward	2817
2		(United Kingdom) Casper Stevenson	2593
3		(United States) Kenton Koch	2564
4		(United Kingdom) Jack Hawksworth (Canada) Parker Thompson	2531
5		(United States) Robby Foley (United States) Patrick Gallagher	2487

Note: Only the top five positions are included for all sets of standings.

GTP Teams' Championship standings
Pos.	+/–	Team	Points
1		(Germany) #6 Porsche Penske Motorsport	2582
2		(Germany) #7 Porsche Penske Motorsport	2451
3		(United States) #24 BMW M Team RLL	2437
4		(United States) #93 Acura Meyer Shank Racing w/ Curb-Agajanian	2387
5		(United States) #10 Cadillac Wayne Taylor Racing	2353

LMP2 Teams' Championship standings
Pos.	+/–	Team	Points
1		(United States) #99 AO Racing	1972
2		(United States) #22 United Autosports USA	1887
3		(United States) #74 Riley	1791
4	1	(France) #11 TDS Racing	1785
5	1	(Poland) #43 Inter Europol Competition	1784

GTD Pro Teams' Championship standings
Pos.	+/–	Team	Points
1		(United States) #3 Corvette Racing by Pratt Miller Motorsports	2942
2		(United States) #81 DragonSpeed	2924
3	1	(Canada) #64 Ford Multimatic Motorsports	2773
4	1	(United States) #77 AO Racing	2707
5	2	(United States) #48 Paul Miller Racing	2599

GTD Teams' Championship standings
Pos.	+/–	Team	Points
1		(United States) #57 Winward Racing	2817
2		(United States) #27 Heart of Racing Team	2593
3		(United States) #12 Vasser Sullivan Racing	2531
4		(United States) #96 Turner Motorsport	2487
5		(United States) #120 Wright Motorsports	2462

Note: Only the top five positions are included for all sets of standings.

GTP Manufacturers' Championship standings
Pos.	+/–	Manufacturer	Points
1		(Germany) Porsche	2804
2		(Japan) Acura	2797
3	1	(United States) Cadillac	2687
4	1	(Germany) BMW	2672
5		(United Kingdom) Aston Martin	2000

GTD Pro Manufacturers' Championship standings
Pos.	+/–	Manufacturer	Points
1		(United States) Chevrolet	3020
2		(Italy) Ferrari	2974
3	1	(United States) Ford	2958
4	1	(Germany) BMW	2940
5		(Germany) Porsche	2809

GTD Manufacturers' Championship standings
Pos.	+/–	Manufacturer	Points
1		(Germany) Mercedes-AMG	3053
2		(Italy) Ferrari	2939
3		(United Kingdom) Aston Martin	2734
4	1	(Germany) Porsche	2730
5	1	(Japan) Lexus	2709

Note: Only the top five positions are included for all sets of standings.

IMSA SportsCar Championship
Previous race: Michelin GT Challenge at VIR	2025 season	Next race: Petit Le Mans
