= Lamborghini SC63 =

Sports prototype racing car

- The No. 63 SC63 at the 2025 Sahlen's Six Hours of The Glen
- Category: Le Mans Daytona h
- Constructor: Lamborghini (Ligier)
- Designers: Mitja Borkert (Head of Design); Jin-ho Seo (Exterior Designer); Rouven Mohr (Chief Technical Officer, Lamborghini)
- Predecessor: Lamborghini Countach QVX

Technical specifications
- Chassis: LMP2-based carbon-fibre monocoque
- Suspension (front): Pushrods, KW dampers and torsion springs with power steering
- Suspension (rear): Pushrods, KW shock absorbers and torsion springs
- Length: 5,100 mm (200.8 in)
- Height: 1,170 mm (46.1 in)
- Wheelbase: 3,148 mm (123.9 in)
- Engine: Lamborghini Squadra Corse 3.8 L (231.9 cu in) 90° V8 twin-turbocharged, DOHC mid-engine, longitudinally-mounted
- Electric motor: Rear-mounted 50 kW (68 PS; 67 hp) spec MGU supplied by Bosch
- Transmission: Xtrac P1359 7-speed sequential semi-automatic
- Power: 500 kW (680 PS; 671 hp)
- Weight: 1,030 kg (2,271 lb)
- Fuel: TotalEnergies (WEC); VP Racing Fuels (IMSA)
- Lubricants: Pertamina Fastron
- Brakes: Brembo carbon 380/355mm with Brembo Monobloc 6-piston calipers
- Tyres: Michelin slicks with Ronal one-piece forged alloys, 29/71-18 front and 34/71-18 rear

Competition history
- Competition: FIA World Endurance Championship; IMSA SportsCar Championship
- Notable entrants: (Italy) Automobili Lamborghini Squadra Corse; (Italy) Lamborghini Iron Lynx
- Notable drivers: (Italy) Mirko Bortolotti; (Italy) Andrea Caldarelli; (France) Romain Grosjean; (Russia) Daniil Kvyat; (Italy) Matteo Cairoli; (Italy) Edoardo Mortara
- Debut: 2024 Qatar 1812 km
- Last event: 2025 Petit Le Mans
Races	Wins	Podiums
15	0	0
Poles	F/Laps	Titles
0	1	0
- Teams' Championships: 0
- Constructors' Championships: 0
- Drivers' Championships: 0

The Lamborghini SC63 is an LMDh sports prototype racing car designed by Lamborghini and built by Ligier to compete in the Hypercar and GTP (Grand Touring Prototype) classes in the FIA World Endurance Championship and IMSA SportsCar Championship, respectively.

The name SC63 is a reference of the following; "SC" stands for the initials of the Lamborghini's motorsport division, Squadra Corse while the number 63 refers to the year of the foundation of the automobile brand, 1963.

== Background ==
On 17 May 2022, Lamborghini formally announced an entry into both the World Endurance Championship and the IMSA SportsCar Championship starting from the 2024 season, using a car designed to the LMDh regulations. One month later, during the 2022 Le Mans press conference, it was confirmed that Lamborghini would work with Ligier as their chassis supplier, making Lamborghini the first manufacturer in the LMDh ruleset to select Ligier as their partner.

Further details about the prototype emerged in September 2022, with Lamborghini announcing that it will be utilizing a hybrid powertrain, consisting of an 90° V8 twin-turbo internal combustion engine and standardized hybrid drivetrain components provided by Williams Advanced Engineering, Bosch and Xtrac, for maximum possible combined output of 671 hp (500 KW). In November 2022 it was announced that Iron Lynx would be responsible for running the factory effort in both the WEC and IMSA.

The partnership would begin with factory-supported GT3 programs in the 2023 IMSA SportsCar Championship and the 2023 GT World Challenge Europe Endurance Cup, which would expand into dual efforts in the 2024 FIA World Endurance Championship and the 2024 IMSA SportsCar Championship. Lamborghini's Head of Motorsport, Giorgio Sanna, said that the manufacturer would be aiming to run a single car in the 2024 editions of the WEC and IMSA, with a double-entry planned for the 2024 24 Hours of Le Mans,

The car was revealed on 13 July 2023, the first day of the 2023 Goodwood Festival of Speed. In interviews post the launch of the car, Sanna stated that Iron Lynx would remain the sole operator of the SC63 during its 4-year life cycle which ends in 2027. He also commented that it was uncertain whether or not the car would debut at the 2024 24 Hours of Daytona.

The SC63 completed its first shakedown at Vallelunga Circuit in early August 2023. It was followed by the car's first full test Imola on 10 and 11 August 2023. Driving duties for the test were split between Mirko Bortolotti, Andrea Caldarelli and Daniil Kvyat, covering over 1500 km. There were a number of notable modifications as compared to the demo-spec of the car at Goodwood, with a more squarish cockpit, flaps on the roof before the air intake and new elements on the rear wing.

== Racing history ==
=== 2024 ===
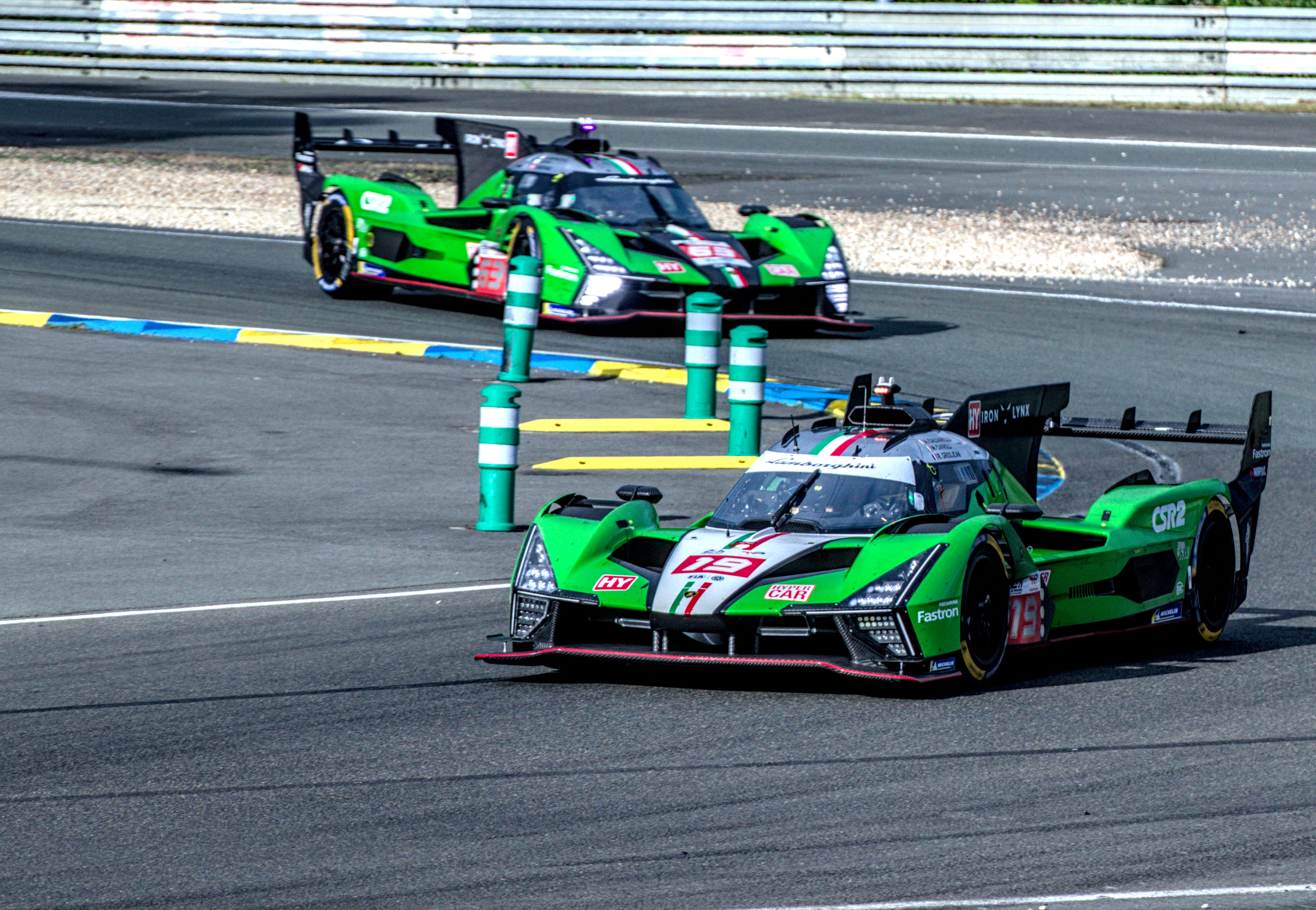
The No. 19 and No. 63 SC63 at the 2024 24 Hours of Le Mans.

Ahead of the 2024 calendar year, Lamborghini announced the driver lineups for the IMSA Michelin Endurance Cup and the FIA World Endurance Championship. Andrea Caldarelli, Matteo Cairoli, and Romain Grosjean were set to race in IMSA, and Mirko Bortolotti, Daniil Kvyat, and Edoardo Mortara were set to race in WEC.

The SC63 completed its global debut at the 2024 Qatar 1812 km alongside fellow series newcomers BMW, Alpine, and Isotta Fraschini. Despite Iron Lynx's hopes that the SC63 would be in the mix amongst the Hypercar field, the car was among the slowest in its class, qualifying in 18th ahead of the last-placed Isotta Fraschini. The car, however, displayed strong reliability and was able to reach the checkered flag, finishing in 13th overall. Two weeks later, it made its IMSA debut at the 2024 12 Hours of Sebring, where it again showed its strong reliability to finish 7th overall. Lamborghini's pace in Sebring was more competitive than in Lusail, able to stay close to the midfield and avoiding falling a lap behind for an extended period of time via a strong defensive driving stint from Grosjean against the race leading Porsche.

Two SC63s were entered by Iron Lynx at the 2024 24 Hours of Le Mans. The second car, entered under No. 19, was driven by Iron Lynx's IMSA lineup of Cairoli, Caldarelli, and Grosjean. Both cars were able to finish the race with no errors, and Lamborghini were able to make their first and only points finish of the season in WEC with the full-season No. 63 car finishing in 10th overall.

Lamborghini fought towards the front at the 2024 IMSA Battle on the Bricks, taking advantage of wet weather conditions and holding the race lead early for nine laps. After receiving a drive-through penalty, the SC63 was again able to climb to the front making use of an alternate pit strategy, but the team's race later ended in retirement after a collision with Proton Competition's Ford Mustang GT3 damaged the rear suspension.

At the conclusion of Lamborghini's respective seasons, they confirmed they would not be returning to the FIA World Endurance Championship the following year in both the Hypercar and LMGT3 classes, as the two-car Hypercar mandate set to be in effect for 2025 was not viable. Riley Technologies were confirmed to assist with the factory operations for the SC63, as Iron Lynx confirmed a brand switch to Mercedes-AMG following a communication breakdown between the team and Lamborghini.

=== 2025 ===
Ahead of the racing season, Lamborghini outlined that 2025 would be another development year for the SC63. Like the previous year, Lamborghini would only compete in the Michelin Endurance Cup rounds of the 2025 IMSA SportsCar Championship. They experienced a troubled start to their IMSA campaign, being forced to retire at the 24 Hours of Daytona and the 12 Hours of Sebring due to technical issues. The SC63 returned three months later for the next Michelin Endurance Cup race at the 2025 Sahlen's Six Hours of The Glen, where it equaled its best performance in the series, finishing in 7th overall. Initially starting in 11th, Romain Grosjean took advantage of mixed conditions early in the race to climb to the front, leading for 23 laps.

On 4 August 2025, in the middle of the IMSA season, Lamborghini announced its decision to pause the LMDh programme for 2026 and withdraw from the IMSA Sportscar Championship at the end of the current season due to a "strategic realignment of its motorsport activities", choosing to focus its efforts on the upcoming Lamborghini Temerario GT3 instead. Lamborghini also stated that they would be open to resuming the project in 2027 if the brand found a suitable factory partner.

Lamborghini rolled out an 'Evo joker' update for the SC63 ahead of the 2025 IMSA Battle on the Bricks, featuring an all-new rear suspension package. The update proved effective on race day, as the SC63 climbed to 5th before its progress was derailed towards the end, following a collision in turn 7 with the lapped No. 7 Porsche and a full-course yellow in the final 10 minutes that neutralized fuel strategies among the field. The car saw a strong end to its campaign in the 2025 Petit Le Mans season finale, making a late charge for the win against Cadillac and Aston Martin before finishing 4th overall, its best performance to date.

== Racing results ==
=== Complete IMSA SportsCar Championship results ===
(key) Races in bold indicates pole position. Races in italics indicates fastest lap.

Year	Entrants	Class	Drivers	No.	1	2	3	4	5	6	7	8	9	Pts.	Pos.
2024	Lamborghini Iron Lynx	GTP			DAY	SEB	LBH	LGA	DET	WGL	ELK	IMS	ATL	986	11th
2024	Lamborghini Iron Lynx	GTP	(Italy) Matteo Cairoli	63		7				Ret		8	Ret	986	11th
2024	Lamborghini Iron Lynx	GTP	(Italy) Andrea Caldarelli	63		7				Ret		8	Ret	986	11th
2024	Lamborghini Iron Lynx	GTP	(France) Romain Grosjean	63		7						8	Ret	986	11th
2025	Automobili Lamborghini Squadra Corse	GTP			DAY	SEB	LBH	LGA	DET	WGL	ELK	IMS	ATL	1209	12th
2025	Automobili Lamborghini Squadra Corse	GTP	(France) Romain Grosjean	63	Ret	Ret				7		10	4	1209	12th
2025	Automobili Lamborghini Squadra Corse	GTP	(Russia) Daniil Kvyat	63	Ret	Ret				7				1209	12th
2025	Automobili Lamborghini Squadra Corse	GTP	(Italy) Mirko Bortolotti	63	Ret	Ret								1209	12th
2025	Automobili Lamborghini Squadra Corse	GTP	(Switzerland) Edoardo Mortara	63	Ret							10	4	1209	12th

=== Complete FIA World Endurance Championship results ===
(key) Races in bold indicates pole position. Races in italics indicates fastest lap.

Year	Entrants	Class	Drivers	No.	1	2	3	4	5	6	7	8	Points	Pos
2024	Lamborghini Iron Lynx	Hypercar			QAT	IMO	SPA	LMN	SAP	COA	FUJ	BHR	11	8th
2024	Lamborghini Iron Lynx	Hypercar	(Italy) Mirko Bortolotti	63	13	12	Ret	10	17	14	Ret	Ret	11	8th
2024	Lamborghini Iron Lynx	Hypercar	(Russia) Daniil Kvyat	63	13	12	Ret	10	17	14	Ret	Ret	11	8th
2024	Lamborghini Iron Lynx	Hypercar	(Italy) Edoardo Mortara	63	13	12		10	17	14	Ret	Ret	11	8th
2024	Lamborghini Iron Lynx	Hypercar	(Italy) Andrea Caldarelli	63			Ret						11	8th
2024	Lamborghini Iron Lynx	Hypercar	(Italy) Matteo Cairoli	19				13					**	**
2024	Lamborghini Iron Lynx	Hypercar	(Italy) Andrea Caldarelli	19				13					**	**
2024	Lamborghini Iron Lynx	Hypercar	(France) Romain Grosjean	19				13					**	**

** Not eligible for championship points.
