= Gar Robinson =

American racing driver

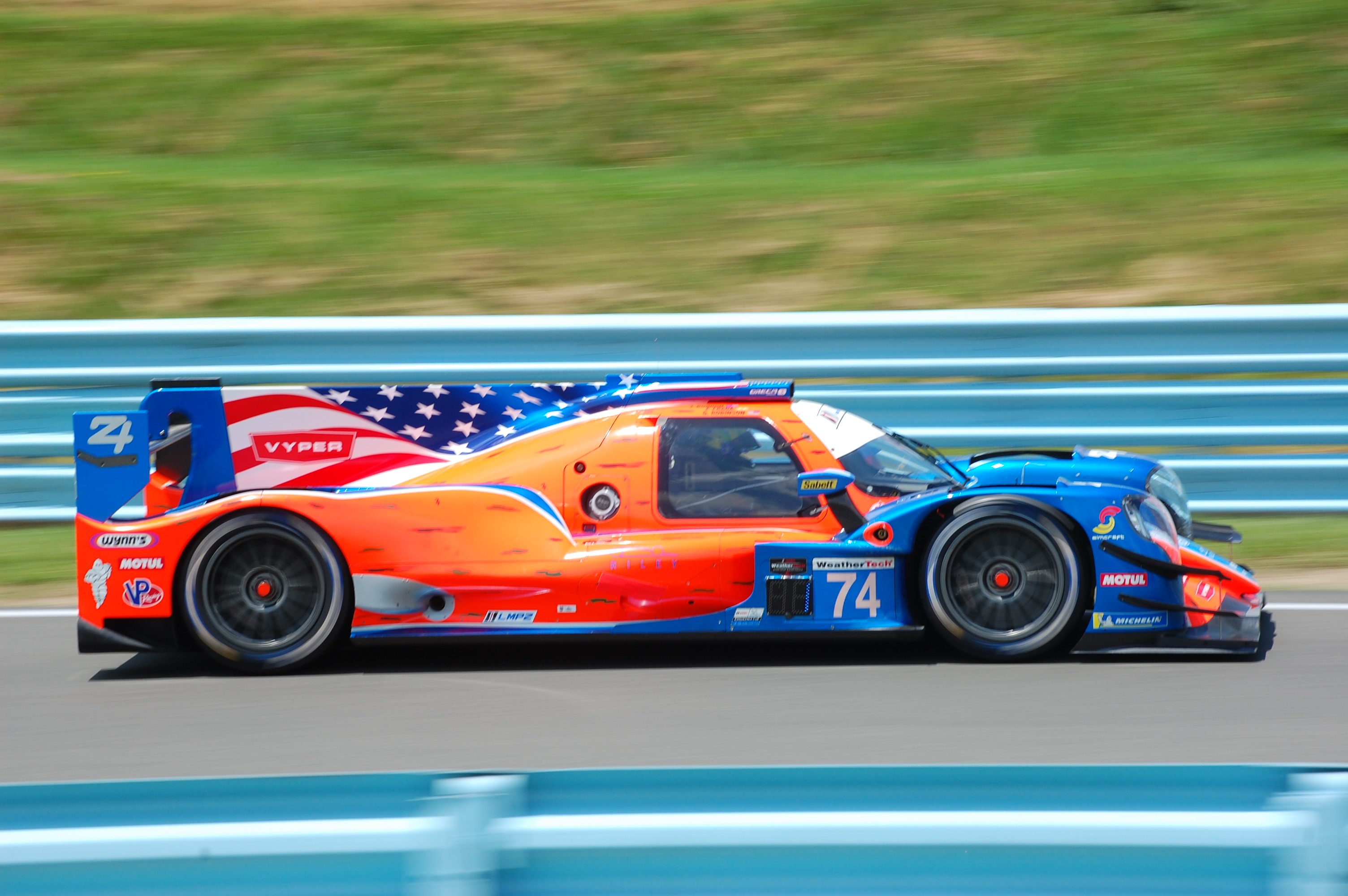
- Robinson's Riley LMP2 in 2025
- Nationality: (United States) American
- Born: George Anderson Robinson; January 17, 1995 (age 31) San Antonio, Texas, U.S.

IMSA SportsCar Championship career
- Debut season: 2016
- Current team: Riley Motorsports
- Categorisation: FIA Silver (until 2022); FIA Bronze (2023–)
- Car number: 74
- Starts: 26
- Championships: 1
- Wins: 6
- Poles: 2
- Best finish: 1st in 2021, 2023
- Finished last season: 1st

Previous series
- Trans-Am Series

Championship titles
- 2015, 2017, 2018: Trans-Am TA2

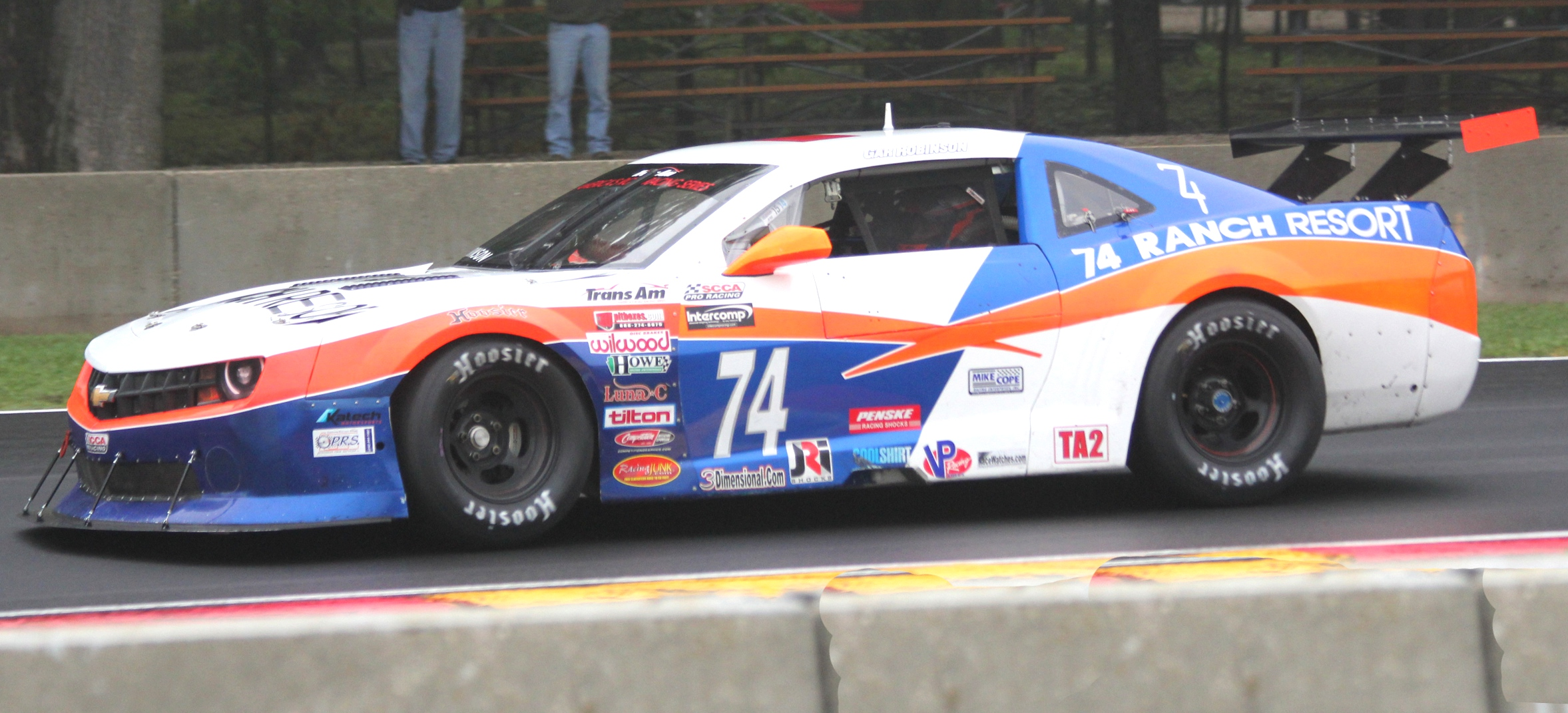
Robinson's 2015 Trans Am car at Road America

George Anderson "Gar" Robinson (born January 17, 1996) is an American racing driver. He is the 2021 and 2023 WeatherTech SportsCar Championship LMP3 Champion and currently drives the No. 74 Oreca 07 for Riley Motorsports in the IMSA WeatherTech SportsCar Championship. Previously, Robinson competed in the Trans-Am Series in the TA2 Class, where he is a two-time champion, winning in 2015 and 2017.

== Early life and career ==
Robinson is the son of former IMSA driver George Robinson. According to the website of his family team, Robinson Racing, his early accomplishments include a Quarter Midget Championship and a third place finish in class at the 2016 24 Hours of Daytona racing a Dodge Viper.

== Racing record ==
=== Career summary ===
Season	Series	Team	Races	Wins	Poles	F/Laps	Podiums	Points	Position
2012	NASA National Championships - Spec Miata		1	0	0	0	0	0	14th
2014	Trans-Am Series - TA2		3	0	0	0	0	69	14th
2014	Lamborghini Super Trofeo USA	AVID Motorsports	2	0	0	0	0	9	27th
2015	Trans-Am Series - TA2		12	3	0	0	9	298	**1st**
2016	IMSA SportsCar Championship - GTD	Riley Motorsports	1	0	0	0	1	31	43rd
2016	Trans-Am Series - TA2	Robinson Racing	12	2	1	2	6	261	**3rd**
2017	Trans-Am Series - TA2	Robinson Racing	13	5	4	4	9	341	**1st**
2018	Trans-Am Series - TA2	Robinson Racing	3	1	0	3	3	92	14th
2018	Pirelli World Challenge - GTS	Robinson Racing							
2018	SprintX GT Championship Series - GTS	Robinson Racing							
2019	IMSA SportsCar Championship - GTD	Lone Star Racing	5	0	0	0	0	83	31st
2019	GT4 America Series - Sprint	Robinson Racing	13	0	1	3	6	137	4th
2019	Trans-Am Series - TA2	PBR Distributions	3	0	0	0	3	135	**2nd**
2020	IMSA SportsCar Championship - GTD	Riley Motorsports	11	0	0	0	1	244	9th
2021	IMSA SportsCar Championship - LMP3	Riley Motorsports	7	4	1	0	6	2176	**1st**
2021	Trans-Am Series - TA2		1	0	0	0	0	17	44th
2022	IMSA SportsCar Championship - LMP3	Riley Motorsports	7	3	3	0	3	1948	**2nd**
2022	IMSA Prototype Challenge	Riley Motorsports	1	0	0	0	0	280	28th
2022	NASCAR Xfinity Series	Jimmy Means Racing	0	0	0	0	0	0	NC
2023	IMSA SportsCar Championship - LMP3	Riley Motorsports	7	4	2	0	6	2162	**1st**
2023	Trans-Am Series - TA	74 Ranch Resort	1	1	1	1	1	92	17th
2024	IMSA SportsCar Championship - LMP2	Riley	7	0	0	0	4	2166	**2nd***
2025	IMSA SportsCar Championship - LMP2	Riley	7	0	0	0	3	2047	4th

=== Complete WeatherTech SportsCar Championship results ===
(key) (Races in bold indicate pole position; results in italics indicate fastest lap)

Year	Team	Class	Make	Engine	1	2	3	4	5	6	7	8	9	10	11	Pos.	Points	Ref
2016	Riley Motorsports	GTD	Dodge Viper GT3-R	Dodge 8.3 L V10	DAY; 3	SEB	LGA	BEL	WGL	MOS	LIM	ELK	VIR	AUS	PET	43rd	31	
2019	Lone Star Racing	GTD	Mercedes-AMG GT3	Mercedes-AMG M159 6.2L V8	DAY	SEB	MDO; 11	DET; 7	WGL	MOS; 11	LIM	ELK; 11	VIR	LGA	PET; 8	31st	83	
2020	Riley Motorsports	GTD	Mercedes-AMG GT3 Evo	Mercedes-AMG M159 6.2L V8	DAY; 11	DAY; 6	SEB; 4	ELK; 6	VIR; 4	ATL; 4	MDO; 2	CHA; 10	PET; 12	LGA; 9	SEB; 9	9th	244	
2021	Riley Motorsports	LMP3	Ligier JS P320	Nissan VK56DE 5.6 L V8	DAY; 11	SEB; 3	**MDO**; 1	WGL; 1	WGL; 1	ELK; 3	PET; 1					1st	2176	
2022	Riley Motorsports	LMP3	Ligier JS P320	Nissan VK56DE 5.6 L V8	DAY; 1	**SEB**; 7	MDO; 4	WGL; 1	**MOS**; 5	ELK; 1	**PET**; 4					2nd	1948	
2023	Riley Motorsports	LMP3	Ligier JS P320	Nissan VK56DE 5.6 L V8	DAY; 9	SEB; 1	**WGL**; 1	**MOS**; 1	ELK; 1	IMS; 2	PET; 3					1st	2162	
2024	Riley	LMP2	Oreca 07	Gibson GK428 4.2 L V8	DAY; 3	SEB; 5	WGL; 2	MOS; 2	ELK; 10	IMS; 5	ATL; 2					2nd	2166	
2025	Riley	LMP2	Oreca 07	Gibson GK428 4.2 L V8	DAY; 2	SEB; 4	WGL; 5	MOS; 3	ELK; 11	IMS; 3	PET; 8					4th	2047	

=== NASCAR ===
(key) (Bold – Pole position awarded by qualifying time. Italics – Pole position earned by points standings or practice time. * – Most laps led.)

==== Xfinity Series ====
NASCAR Xfinity Series results
Year	Driver	No.	Make	1	2	3	4	5	6	7	8	9	10	11	12	13	14	15	16	17	18	19	20	21	22	23	24	25	26	27	28	29	30	31	32	33	NXSC	Pts	Ref
2022	Jimmy Means Racing	52	Chevy	DAY	CAL	LVS	PHO	ATL	COA; DNQ	RCH	MAR	TAL	DOV	DAR	TEX	CLT	PIR	NSH	ROA	ATL	NHA	POC	IND	MCH	GLN	DAY	DAR	KAN	BRI	TEX	TAL	CLT	LVS	HOM	MAR	PHO	N/A	0	

Sporting positions
Preceded by None	WeatherTech SportsCar Championship; LMP3 Champion; 2021	Succeeded by Colin Braun; Jobn Bennett
Preceded by Colin Braun; Jobn Bennett	WeatherTech SportsCar Championship; LMP3 Champion; 2023	Succeeded by None (Class discontinued)
