= Aaron Muss =

American snowboarder and racing driver (born 1994)

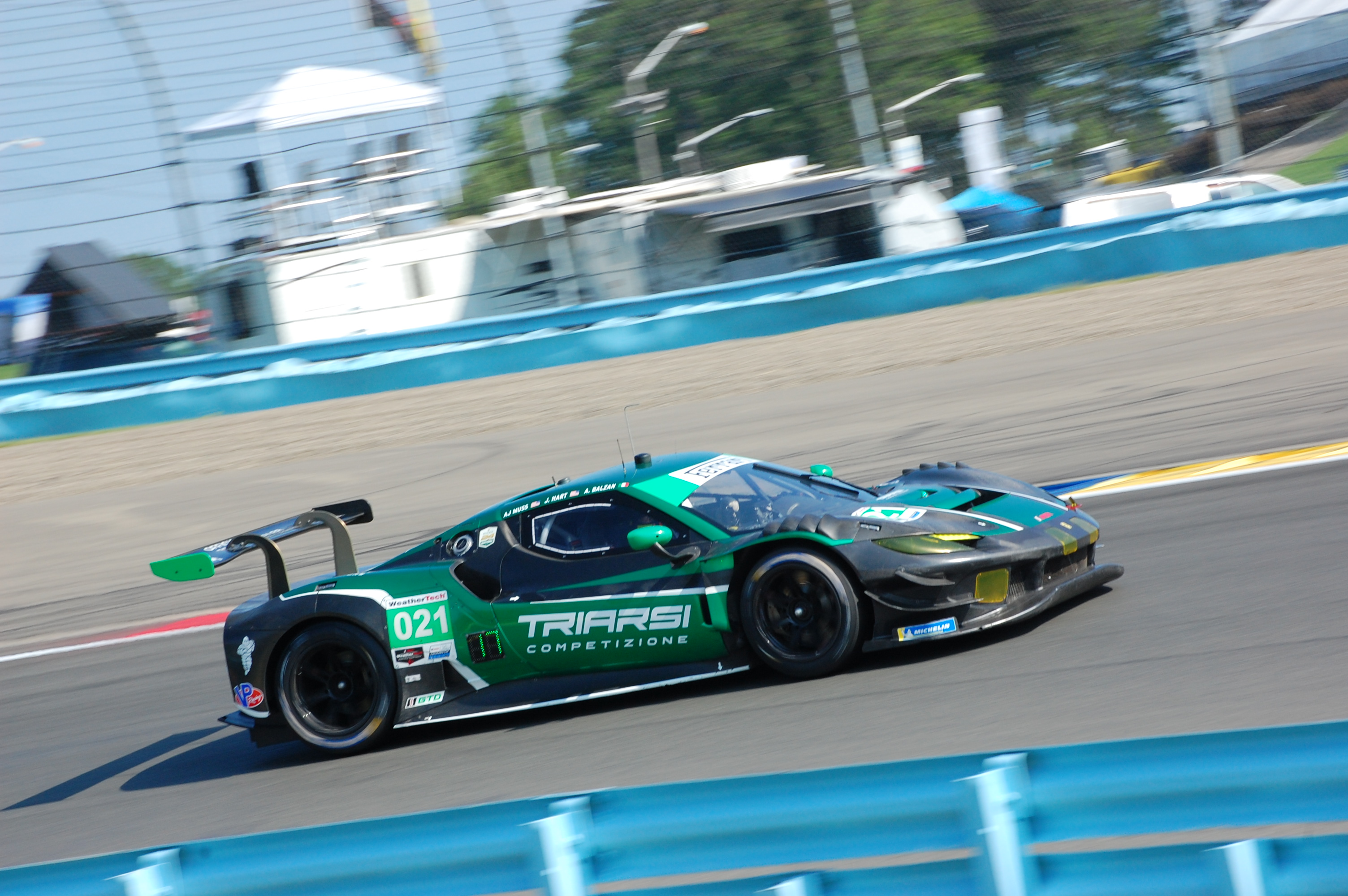
- Muss' Triarsi Ferrari in 2025

Personal information
- Born: December 15, 1994 (age 31) New Brunswick, New Jersey, U.S.

Sport
- Country: United States
- Sport: Snowboarding; Auto racing
- Categorisation: FIA Silver

Aaron "AJ" Muss (born December 15, 1994) is an American snowboarder and racing driver.

Muss competed in the 2013 and 2017 FIS Snowboard World Championships, as well as the 2018 Winter Olympics, in parallel giant slalom. In 2013, following a medical emergency, he was clinically dead for 30 seconds and then placed in an induced coma for two weeks. Muss made the switch to competitive motorsport in 2020, racing in the Michelin Pilot Challenge for Hyundai before making it all the way to the IMSA SportsCar Championship in 2025, and GT World Challenge Europe in 2026.
