= Lars Kern =

German racing driver (born 1987)

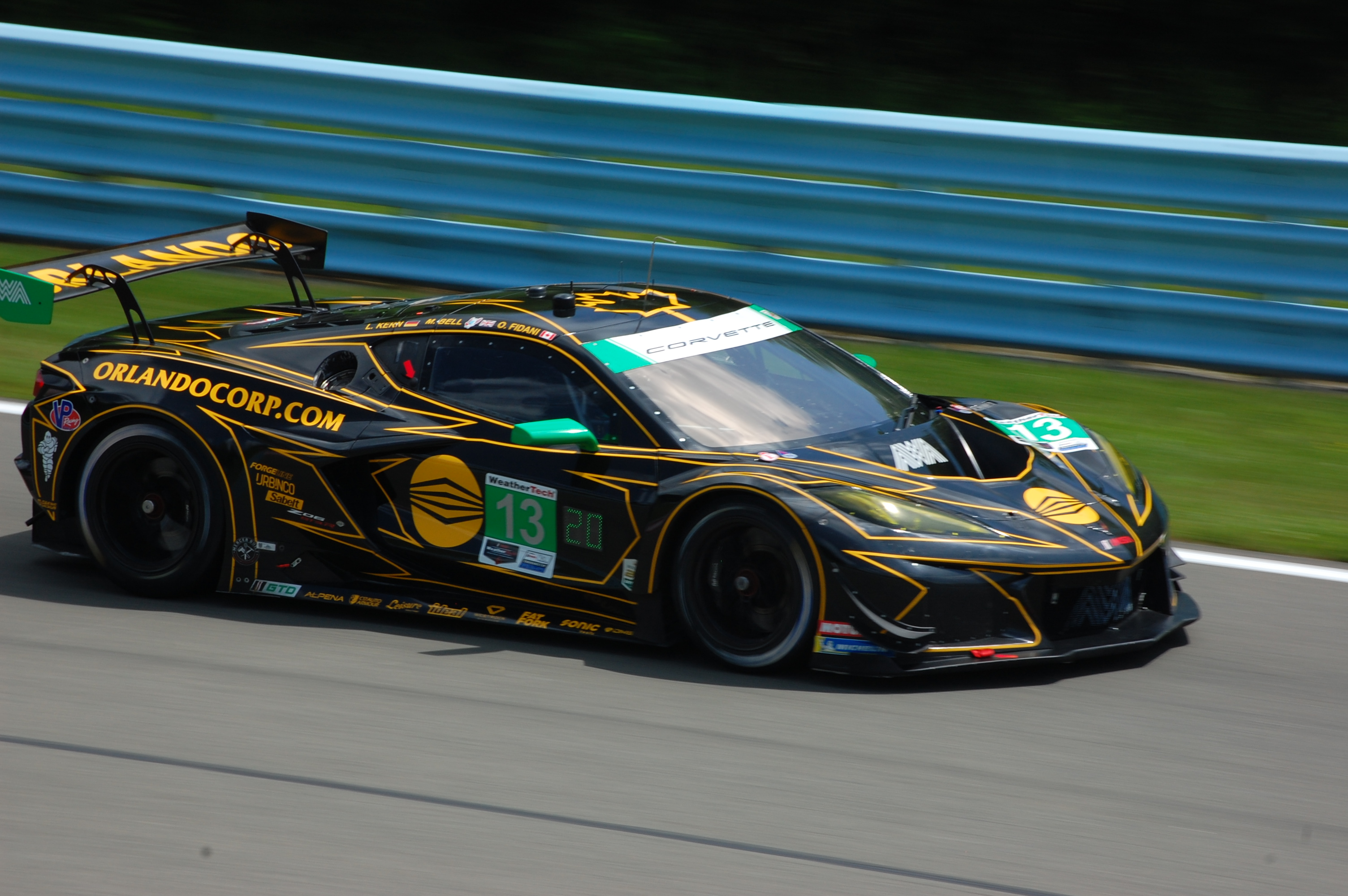
- Kern in 2025
- Nationality: (Germany) German
- Born: 18 November 1987 (age 38) Weissach, Baden-Württemberg, Germany

IMSA SportsCar Championship career
- Debut season: 2019
- Current team: AWA
- Categorisation: FIA Silver
- Car number: 13
- Starts: 25
- Wins: 2
- Podiums: 6
- Poles: 0
- Fastest laps: 0
- Best finish: 11th in 2023

Lars Kern (born 18 November 1987) is a German racing driver. He currently competes in the 2025 IMSA SportsCar Championship driving the No. 13 AWA Chevrolet Corvette Z06 GT3.R. Kern is the GTD class winner of the 2025 24 Hours of Daytona with AWA and the SP-X class winner of the 2016 24 Hours of Nürburgring. He was part of the Manthey crew that won the 2021 24 Hours of Nürburgring overall, but was unable to race due to illness.

Kern is also a Porsche development driver and holds multiple lap records in Porsche production cars at the Nürburgring.

== Career ==
=== IMSA SportsCar Championship ===
==== 2019 ====
In 2019, Kern signed with Pfaff Motorsports to compete in the Michelin Endurance Cup rounds of the 2019 IMSA SportsCar Championship. He would drive alongside Scott Hargrove and Zacharie Robichon for the season. Kern would score his best result in Petit Le Mans finishing third.

==== 2020 ====
Kern returned to the championship for the 2020 season, resigning with Pfaff Motorsports to drive their No. 9 Porsche 911 GT3 R alongside Dennis Olsen and Zacharie Robichon. In the first race of the season at Daytona, Kern qualified on pole in the GTD class, however he and his co-drivers were not able to translate this in the race, finishing 13th in class. Originally, Kern was signed to drive in the Michelin Endurance Cup rounds, but due to the COVID-19 pandemic, he only competed in two races the entire season, the second of which being Petit Le Mans. In Petit Le Mans, Kern finished fifth in the race.

==== 2021 ====
Following a shortened 2020 season, Kern returned for the 2021 IMSA SportsCar Championship to drive Pfaff Motorsports' No. 9 Porsche 911 GT3 R alongside Zacharie Robichon and Laurens Vanthoor. Kern would win his first race in the championship in the second race at the 12 Hours of Sebring. He would also finish on the podium in second at Petit Le Mans. That year, Kern was also part of the Manthey Racing crew that won the 24 Hours of Nürburgring overall, together with Matteo Cairoli, Michael Christensen and Kévin Estre, but he was unable to race due to illness and therefore wasn't credited with the victory.

==== 2022 ====
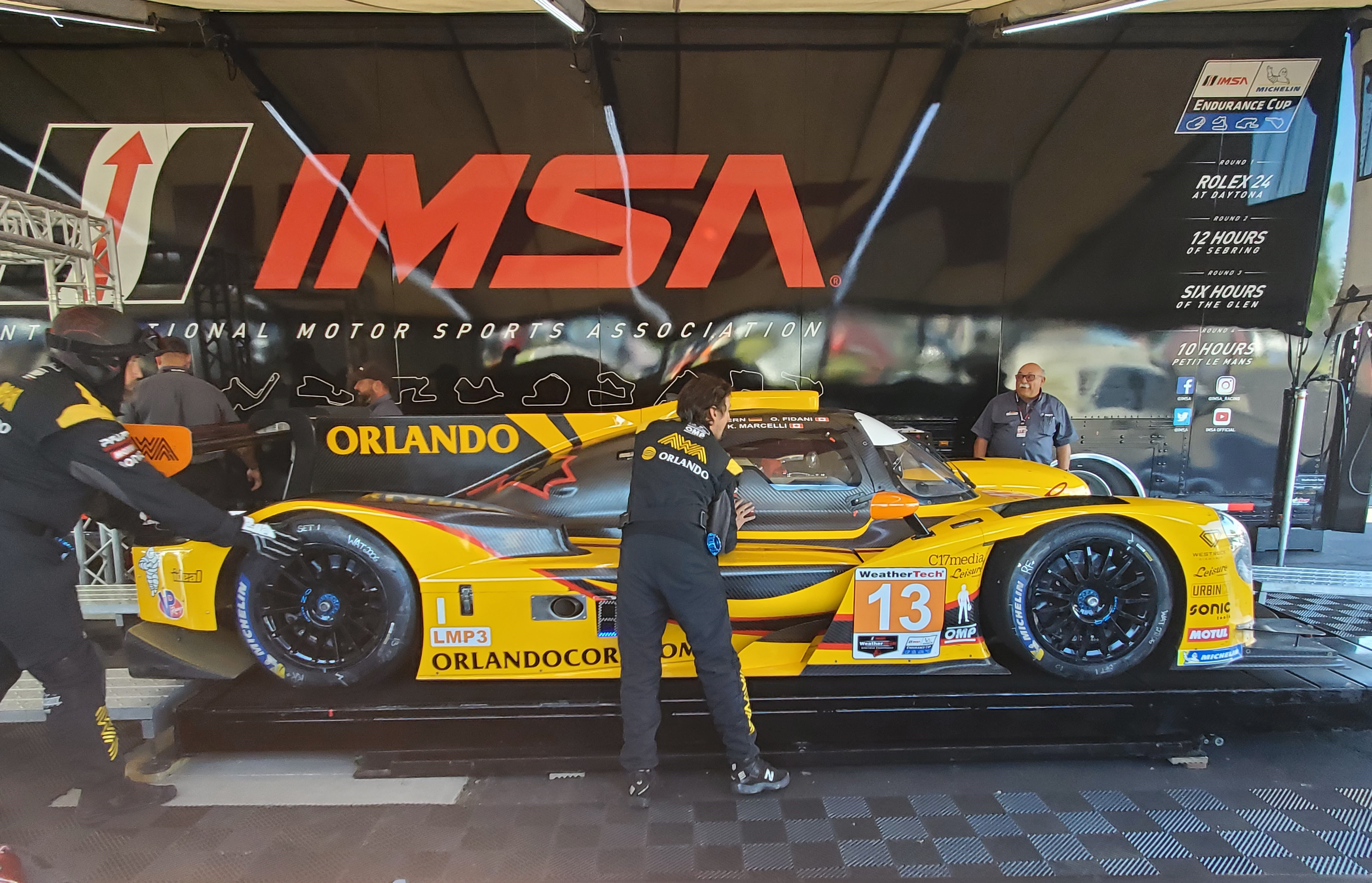
Kern's AWA No. 13 Duqueine M30 - D08 at the 2022 Sahlen's Six Hours of the Glen

For the 2022 season, Kern switched teams to newcomer AWA, joining Matt Bell, Orey Fidani, and Kuno Wittmer to drive the team's No. 13 Duqueine M30 - D08 in LMP3 for the Michelin Endurance Cup rounds of the season. In the opening race of the season, he would finish in fifth for the team. Kern would have a decent season, finishing a best of fourth at Sebring.

==== 2023 ====
Kern resigned with AWA for the 2023 IMSA SportsCar Championship to drive in the Michelin Endurance Cup rounds of the season. He would be paired up with Matt Bell and Orey Fidani once again. In the second race of the season at Sebring, the trio would get their first podium of the season finishing second. They would get another podium at Petit Le Mans, finishing in second.

==== 2024 ====
For 2024, Kern resigned with AWA for the 2024 season, however, he and the team would switch to the GTD class where Kern would drive the team's brand new Chevrolet Corvette Z06 GT3.R. Bell and Fidani would once again join the team alongside Kern. They would have a difficult season, with no podiums and a best result of sixth. However, due to Fidani consistency throughout the season, he and the team were awarded with the Bob Akin Award for Bronze rated drivers. This gave the team, Fidani, Bell, and Kern an automatic invite to the 2025 24 Hours of Le Mans.

==== 2025 ====
Kern returned to the championship for the 2025 season once again with AWA. Matt Bell and Orey Fidani would return as Kern's teammates aboard the No. 13 Chevrolet Corvette Z06 GT3.R, Marvin Kirchhöfer joining them for the 24 Hours of Daytona. The opening race of the season at Daytona did not start off strongly, with Fidani only qualifying 16th in class for the race. Although during the race, the team showed that they had pace and made their way up the field. Towards the closing hours of the race, the team sat in third behind the No. 27 Heart of Racing Team Aston Martin and the No. 120 Wright Motorsports Porsche who were battling for the lead. Bell, who was in the car at this stage, overtook the No. 120 and battled with the No. 27 to take the lead of the race. With 20 minutes to go, Bell overtook the No. 27 for the race lead and kept it. Kern, Bell, Kirchhöfer, and Fidani crossed the finish in first, winning the 2025 24 Hours of Daytona.

=== 24 Hours of Le Mans ===
==== 2025 ====
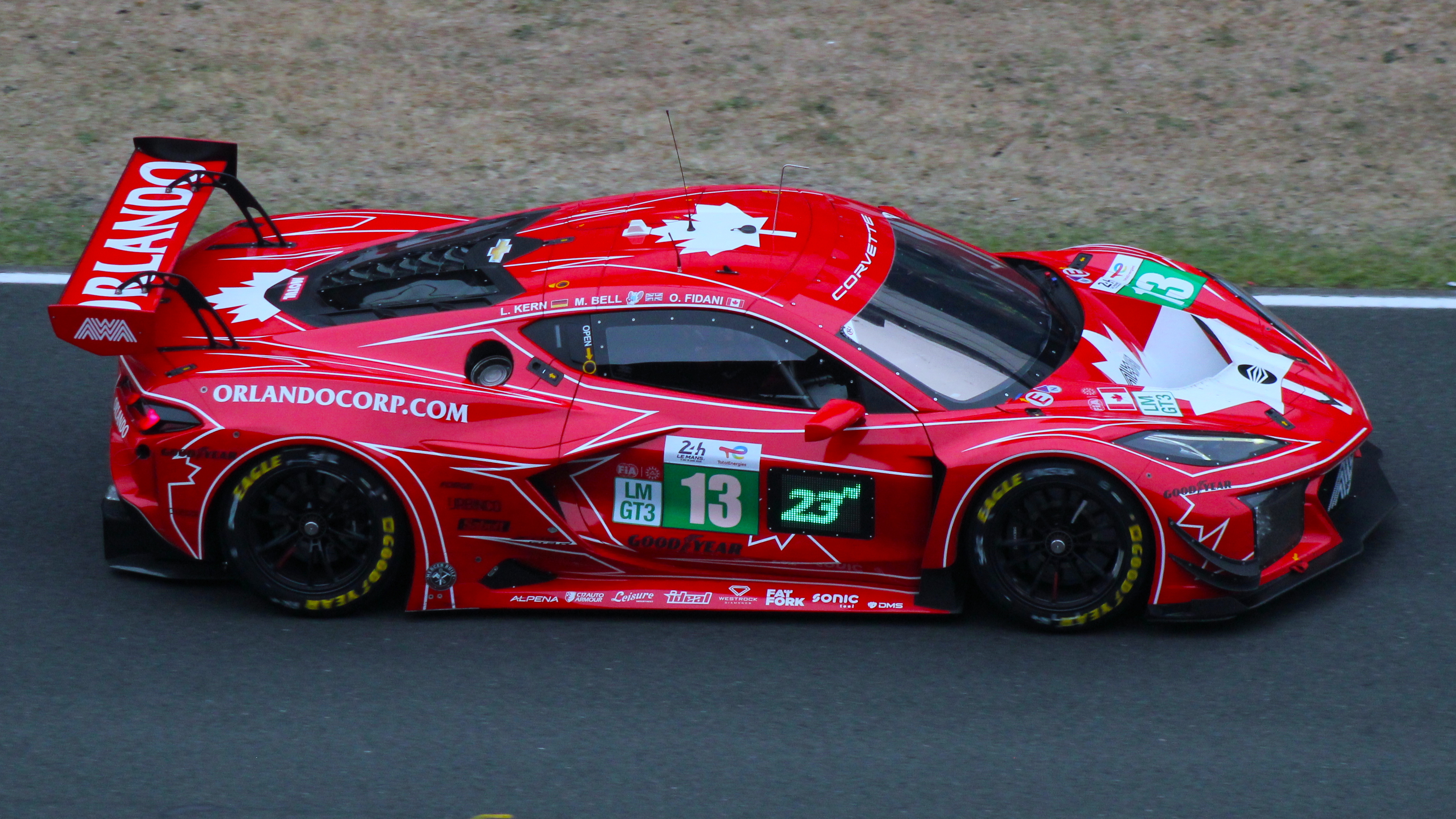
Kern in the No. 13 AWA Chevrolet Corvette Z06 GT3.R at the 2025 24 Hours of Le Mans

With AWA winning the Bob Akin Award at the 2024 IMSA SportsCar Championship, the team and Kern received an automatic invite to the 2025 24 Hours of Le Mans. Matt Bell and Orey Fidani would rejoin the team and Kern for Le Mans. They would finish a respectable tenth in the LMGT3 class in their debut.

== Racing record ==
=== Career summary ===
Season	Series	Team	Races	Wins	Poles	F/Laps	Podiums	Points	Position
2010	ADAC GT Masters	Jola Competition	2	0	0	0	0	0	62nd
2011	Belcar Endurance Championship	Speedlover	6	0	0	0	0	45	11th
2016	ADAC 24 Hours of Nürburgring - SP-X	Manthey Racing	1	1	–	–	1	–	**1st**
2017	Porsche Carrera Cup Australia	Porsche Centre Melbourne	8	0	0	1	1	191.5	11th
2017	VLN Langstrecken Serie - SP9	Manthey Racing	4	0	0	0	1	0	NC
2017	ADAC 24 Hours of Nürburgring - SP-X	Manthey Racing	1	0	–	–	1	–	**2nd**
2017	VLN Nürburgring Series - SPX	Manthey Racing	4	2	1	0	2	0	NC
2017	Porsche Invitational Race - Sepang	Robert Gattereder	1	0	0	0	0	0	13th
2018	24H Series - Championship of the Continents - A6	Manthey Racing	1	0	0	0	1	0	NC
2018	VLN Langstrecken Serie - SP9 Pro	Manthey Racing	5	0	0	0	0	10.73	27th
2018	ADAC 24 Hours of Nürburgring - SP-X	Manthey Racing	1	0	0	0	0	0	17th
2018	Belgian Endurance	Belgium Racing	1	0	0	0	1	199	**2nd**
2018	VLN Endurance	Manthey Racing, KÜS Team75 Bernhard	5	0	0	0	0	14.4	378th
2019	IMSA SportsCar Championship - GTD	Pfaff Motorsports	4	0	0	0	1	91	29th
2019	ADAC GT4 Germany	Team Allied-Racing	8	0	1	0	3	88	8th
2019	24 Hours of the Nürburgring - SP9 Pro	Manthey Racing	1	0	0	0	0	0	5th
2019	VLN Langstrecken Serie - SP9 Pro	Manthey Racing	2	0	0	0	0	5.5	62nd
2020	IMSA SportsCar Championship - GTD	Pfaff Motorsports	2	0	1	0	0	44	35th
2020	VLN Langstrecken Serie - SP9 Pro	Manthey Racing	4	0	0	0	0	16.04	31st
2020	24 Hours of the Nürburgring - SP9	Frikadelli Racing Team	1	0	0	0	0	0	7th
2021	IMSA SportsCar Championship - GTD	Pfaff Motorsports	4	1	0	0	2	1215	20th
2021	VLN Langstrecken Series - SP9 Pro/Am	Manthey Racing	3	1	0	0	1	0	NC
2021	VLN Langstrecken Series - SP9 Pro/Am	Falken Motorsports	1	0	0	0	0	0	NC
2021	GT World Challenge Europe Endurance Cup	Team Allied Racing	1	0	0	0	0	0	NC
2022	IMSA SportsCar Championship - LMP3	AWA	4	0	0	0	0	812	9th
2022	VLN Langstrecken Series - SP9 Pro	Falken Motorsports	1	0	0	0	0	0	NC
2022	Michelin Pilot Challenge - GS	Absolute Racing	1	0	0	0	0	50	71st
2022	GT4 America Series - Pro-Am	Absolute Racing	2	0	0	0	0	0	NC
2022	Le Mans Cup - LMP3	Haegeli by T2 Racing	1	0	0	0	0	1	36th
2022	24 Hours of the Nürburgring - SP9 Pro/Am	Huber Motorsport	1	0	–	–	1	0	**3rd**
2023	IMSA SportsCar Championship - LMP3	AWA	4	0	0	0	2	952	11th
2023	VLN Langstrecken Series - SP9 Pro	Huber Motorsport	1	0	0	0	0	0	NC
2023	24 Hours of the Nürburgring - SP9	Huber Motorsport	1	0	0	0	0	0	NC
2024	IMSA SportsCar Championship - GTD	AWA	5	0	0	1	0	1062	5th
2024	Le Mans Cup - GT3	Kessel Racing	2	0	0	0	0	0	NC
2025	IMSA SportsCar Championship - GTD	AWA	5	1	0	1	1	1320	20th
2025	24 Hours of Le Mans - LMGT3	AWA	1	0	0	0	0	N/A	10th
2026	IMSA SportsCar Championship - GTD	13 Autosport	5	0	0	1	0	1221	27th
2026	24 Hours of Le Mans - LMGT3	13 Autosport	1	0	0	0	0	N/A	DNF
2026	Nürburgring Langstrecken-Serie - SP10	Manthey Racing							
2026	Nürburgring Langstrecken-Serie - SP-Pro	Manthey Racing							
2026	GT World Challenge America - Pro-Am	Kellymoss	1	0	0	0	0	0	NC†

* Season still in progress.

=== Complete IMSA SportsCar Championship results ===
(key) (Races in bold indicate pole position) (Races in italics indicate fastest lap)

Year	Entrant	Class	Chassis	Engine	1	2	3	4	5	6	7	8	9	10	11	12	Pos.	Pts
2019	Pfaff Motorsports	GTD	Porsche 911 GT3 R	Porsche 4.0 L Flat-6	DAY; 16	SEB; 10	MOH	BEL	WGL; 6	MOS	LIM	ELK	VIR	LGA	ATL; 3		29th	91
2020	Pfaff Motorsports	GTD	Porsche 911 GT3 R	Porsche 4.0 L Flat-6	**DAY**; **1**; 13	DAY; 2	SEB; 1	ELK	VIR	ATL; 1	MOH	CLT	ATL; 2; 5	LGA	SEB; 2		35th	44
2021	Pfaff Motorsports	GTD	Porsche 911 GT3 R	Porsche 4.0 L Flat-6	DAY; 12	SEB; 1	MOH	BEL	WGL; 1	WGL; 2; 7	LIM	ELK	LGA; 5	LBH	VIR	ATL; 2	20th	1215
2022	AWA	LMP3	Duqueine M30 - D-08	Nissan VK56 V8 5.6L	DAY; 5	SEB; 4	MOH	WGL; 9	MOS	ELK	ATL; 7						19th	812
2023	AWA	LMP3	Duqueine M30 - D-08	Nissan VK56 V8 5.6L	DAY; 4	SEB; 2	WGL; 5	MOS	ELK	IMS	ATL; 2						11th	952
2024	AWA	GTD	Chevrolet Corvette Z06 GT3.R	Chevrolet LT6 5.5 L V8	DAY; 21	SEB; 9	LBH	LGA	WGL; 7	MOS	ELK	VIR	IMS; 6	ATL; 11			35th	1062
2025	AWA	GTD	Chevrolet Corvette Z06 GT3.R	Chevrolet LT6 5.5 L V8	DAY; 1	SEB; 10	LBH	LGA	WGL; 9	MOS	ELK	VIR	IMS; 6	ATL; 9			20th	1320
2026	13 Autosport	GTD	Chevrolet Corvette Z06 GT3.R	Chevrolet LT6 5.5 L V8	DAY; 4	SEB; 6	LBH	LGA	WGL; 13	MOS	ELK; 7	VIR	IMS	PET; 10			27th	1221

* Season still in progress.

==== 24 Hours of Daytona results ====
Year	Class	No	Team	Car	Co-drivers	Laps	Position	Class Pos.
2019	GTD	9	(Canada) Pfaff Motorsports	Porsche 911 GT3 R	(Canada) Scott Hargrove (Norway) Dennis Olsen (Canada) Zacharie Robichon	470	37 ^{DNF}	16 ^{DNF}
2020	GTD	9	(Canada) Pfaff Motorsports	Porsche 911 GT3 R	(Norway) Dennis Olsen (Canada) Zacharie Robichon (France) Patrick Pilet	716	32	13
2021	GTD	9	(Canada) Pfaff Motorsports	Porsche 911 GT3 R	(Norway) Matt Campbell (Canada) Zacharie Robichon (Belgium) Laurens Vanthoor	702	36	12
2022	LMP3	13	(Canada) AWA	Duqueine M30 - D-08	(United Kingdom) Matt Bell (Canada) Orey Fidani (Canada) Kuno Wittmer	695	32	5
2023	LMP3	13	(Canada) AWA	Duqueine M30 - D-08	(United Kingdom) Matt Bell (Canada) Orey Fidani (Germany) Moritz Kranz	717	35	4
2024	GTD	13	(Canada) AWA	Chevrolet Corvette Z06 GT3.R	(United Kingdom) Matt Bell (Canada) Orey Fidani (United Kingdom) Alex Lynn	308	51 ^{DNF}	21 ^{DNF}
2025	GTD	13	(Canada) AWA	Chevrolet Corvette Z06 GT3.R	(United Kingdom) Matt Bell (Canada) Orey Fidani (Germany) Marvin Kirchhöfer	719	21	**1**

==== 24 Hours of Nürburgring results ====
Year	Class	No	Team	Car	Co-drivers	Laps	Position	Class Pos.
2016	SP-X	170	(Germany) Manthey Racing	Porsche Cayman GT4	(Germany) Christoph Breuer (Germany) Christian Gebhardt	121	23	**1**
2017	SP-X	150	(Germany) Manthey Racing	Porsche Cayman 981 GT4 CS	(Germany) Christoph Breuer (Germany) Moritz Oberheim (Germany) Marc Hennerici	144	27	**2**
2018	SP9	12	(Germany) Manthey Racing	Porsche 911 GT3 R	(Germany) Christoph Breuer (Germany) Moritz Oberheim (Germany) Marc Hennerici	129	18	17
2019	SP9	12	(Germany) Manthey Racing	Porsche 911 GT3 R (17)	(Italy) Matteo Cairoli (Germany) Otto Klohs (Norway) Dennis Olsen	155	4	4
2020	SP9 Pro	31	(Germany) Frikadelli Racing Team	Porsche 911 GT3 R	(Germany) Lance David Arnold (France) Mathieu Jaminet (Belgium) Maxime Martin	85	7	7
2022	SP9 Pro/Am	25	(Germany) Huber Motorsport	Porsche 911 GT3 R	(Germany) Nico Menzel (Germany) Klaus Rader (Germany) Joachim Thyssen	156	11	**3**
2023	SP9 Pro	25	(Germany) Huber Motorsport	Porsche 911 GT3 R	(France) Romain Dumas (Germany) Dennis Fetzer (France) Côme Ledogar	105	DNF	DNF

=== Complete 24 Hours of Le Mans results ===
Year	Team	Co-Drivers	Car	Class	Laps	Pos.	Class Pos.
2025	(Canada) AWA Racing	(United Kingdom) Matt Bell (Canada) Orey Fidani	Chevrolet Corvette Z06 GT3.R	LMGT3	338	42nd	10th
2026	(Canada) 13 Autosport	(United Kingdom) Matt Bell (Canada) Orey Fidani	Chevrolet Corvette Z06 GT3.R	LMGT3	61	DNF	DNF
