= 2017 VLN Series =

Motorsport season

The 2017 VLN Series was the 40th season of the VLN.

The drivers championship was won by Michael Schrey, driving a BMW M235i Racing Cup for Bonk-Motorsport.

== Calendar ==
Rnd.	Race	Length	Circuit	Date
1	63. ADAC Westfalenfahrt	4 hours	(Germany) Nürburgring Nordschleife	March 25
2	42. DMV 4-Stunden-Rennen	4 hours	(Germany) Nürburgring Nordschleife	April 8
3	59. ADAC ACAS H&R-Cup	4 hours	(Germany) Nürburgring Nordschleife	June 24
4	48. Adenauer ADAC Rundstrecken-Trophy	4 hours	(Germany) Nürburgring Nordschleife	July 8
5	ROWE 6 Stunden ADAC Ruhr-Pokal-Rennen	6 hours	(Germany) Nürburgring Nordschleife	August 19
6	40. RCM DMV Grenzlandrennen	4 hours	(Germany) Nürburgring Nordschleife	September 2
7	57. ADAC Reinoldus-Langstreckenrennen	4 hours (Note: The race was stopped after 3 hours 33 minutes (22 laps) due to an accident between Fuchsröhre and Adenauer Forst leaving dirt and debris on the track surface. The classification was later corrected to reflect the standings at the end of the 21st lap.)	(Germany) Nürburgring Nordschleife	September 23
8	49. ADAC Barbarossapreis	4 hours	(Germany) Nürburgring Nordschleife	October 7
9	42. DMV Münsterlandpokal	4 hours	(Germany) Nürburgring Nordschleife	October 21

== Race results ==
Results indicate overall winners only.

Rnd	Circuit	Pole position	Winners
1	(Germany) Nürburgring Nordschleife	No. 911 (Germany) Manthey Racing	No. 911 (Germany) Manthey Racing
1	(Germany) Nürburgring Nordschleife	(France) Romain Dumas (France) Frédéric Makowiecki (France) Patrick Pilet	(France) Romain Dumas (France) Frédéric Makowiecki (France) Patrick Pilet
2	(Germany) Nürburgring Nordschleife	No. 12 (Germany) Manthey Racing	No. 911 (Germany) Manthey Racing
2	(Germany) Nürburgring Nordschleife	(Germany) Otto Klohs (France) Mathieu Jaminet (Germany) Lars Kern	(Austria) Richard Lietz (France) Frédéric Makowiecki
3	(Germany) Nürburgring Nordschleife	No. 59 (Germany) Manthey Racing	No. 22 (Germany) Team Monschau
3	(Germany) Nürburgring Nordschleife	(Switzerland) "Steve Smith" (Germany) "Randy Walls" (Germany) Sven Müller	(Germany) Georg Weiss (Germany) Oliver Kainz (Germany) Jochen Krumbach
4	(Germany) Nürburgring Nordschleife	No. 59 (Germany) Manthey Racing	No. 3 (Germany) Falken Motorsports
4	(Germany) Nürburgring Nordschleife	(Switzerland) "Steve Smith" (Germany) Sven Müller (Germany) "Randy Walls"	(Netherlands) Stef Dusseldorp (Germany) Jörg Müller
5	(Germany) Nürburgring Nordschleife	No. 4 (Germany) Falken Motorsports	No. 911 (Germany) Manthey Racing
5	(Germany) Nürburgring Nordschleife	(Austria) Martin Ragginger (Austria) Klaus Bachler	(France) Romain Dumas (France) Kévin Estre (France) Mathieu Jaminet
6	(Germany) Nürburgring Nordschleife	No. 911 (Germany) Manthey Racing	No. 28 (Germany) Land-Motorsport
6	(Germany) Nürburgring Nordschleife	(France) Romain Dumas (France) Patrick Pilet	(United States) Connor De Phillippi (Netherlands) Robin Frijns
7	(Germany) Nürburgring Nordschleife	No. 8 (Germany) HARIBO Racing Team	No. 911 (Germany) Manthey Racing
7	(Germany) Nürburgring Nordschleife	(Germany) Lance David Arnold (Germany) Mario Farnbacher (Spain) Daniel Juncadella	(Denmark) Michael Christensen (France) Kévin Estre
8	(Germany) Nürburgring Nordschleife	No. 22 (Germany) Team Monschau	No. 28 (Germany) Land-Motorsport
8	(Germany) Nürburgring Nordschleife	(Germany) Georg Weiss (Germany) Oliver Kainz (Germany) Jochen Krumbach	(Belgium) Dries Vanthoor (Germany) Markus Winkelhock
9	(Germany) Nürburgring Nordschleife	No. 15 (Germany) Phoenix Racing	No. 911 (Germany) Manthey Racing
9	(Germany) Nürburgring Nordschleife	(Germany) Frank Stippler (Germany) Christian Mamerow (Netherlands) Robin Frijns	(France) Frédéric Makowiecki (Germany) Lars Kern

== See also ==
- 2017 24 Hours of Nürburgring

== Bibliography ==
- Jörg Hildebrand & Hasso Jacoby. Grüne Hölle 2017: Die Langstreckenrennen auf dem Nürburgring (in German). Weiss Verlag. ISBN 978-3-923632-23-7.
