= 2020 Petit Le Mans =

Sportscar endurance race in Georgia, US

The Track map of Road Atlanta

The 2020 Petit Le Mans (formally known as the 2020 MOTUL Petit Le Mans for sponsorship reasons) was the 23rd running of the Petit Le Mans, and was held on October 17, 2020. It was the 9th race in the 2020 IMSA WeatherTech Sportscar Championship, and the 3rd race of the 2020 Michelin Endurance Cup, and was run at Road Atlanta in Braselton, Georgia. The race was won overall by the #10 Konica Minolta Cadillac Cadillac DPi-V.R after the #7 Acura Team Penske and #31 Whelen Engineering Racing entries made contact and spun out in the closing minutes of the race.

== Background ==
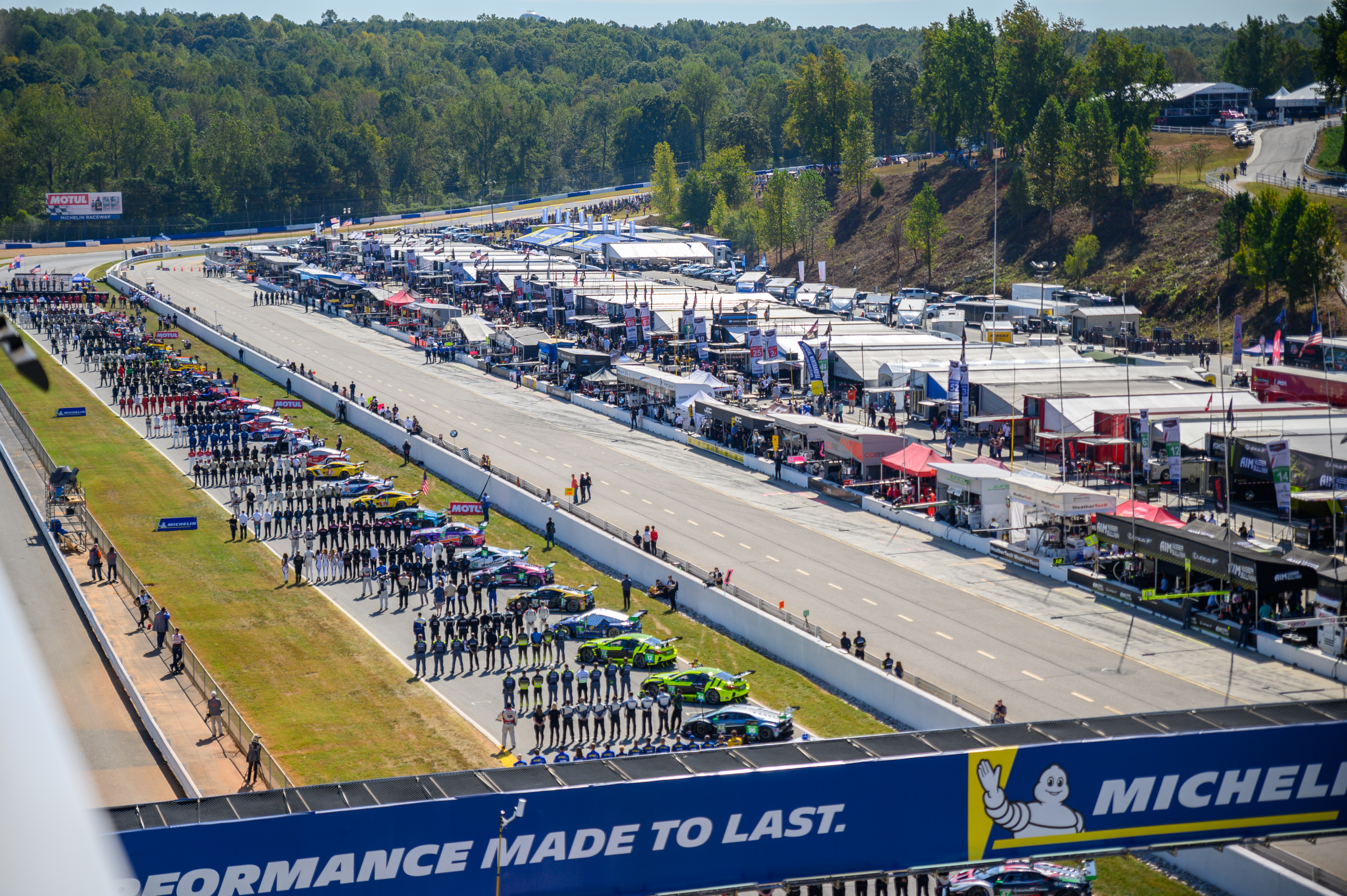

Michelin Raceway Road Atlanta, where the race was held.

Then International Motor Sports Association's (IMSA) president Scott Atherton confirmed the race was part of the schedule for the 2020 IMSA SportsCar Championship (IMSA SCC) in August 2019. It was the seventh consecutive year it was part of the IMSA SCC, and the 23rd Petit Le Mans. The 2020 Petit Le Mans was the ninth of eleven sports car races of 2020 by IMSA, and the third of four races of the Michelin Endurance Cup (MEC). The race took place at the 12-turn, 2.540-mile (4.088 km) Road Atlanta in Braselton, Georgia. The event was one of the first postponed by IMSA as a result of the emerging COVID-19 pandemic, with the organization citing CDC regulations on public gatherings as the official cause of postponement. The race was rescheduled from running on October 10, 2020, to October 17, 2020. Due to the 12 Hours of Sebring getting postponed, Petit Le Mans would not be the season finale for the first time in the IMSA WeatherTech SportsCar Championship.

Before the race, Ryan Briscoe and Renger van der Zande led the DPi Drivers' Championship with 180 points, ahead of Pipo Derani in second with 177 points, and Helio Castroneves and Ricky Taylor with 175 points. In LMP2, Patrick Kelly led the Drivers' Championship with 98 points, 6 points ahead of Dwight Merriman and Kyle Tilley. Antonio García and Jordan Taylor led the GTLM Drivers' Championship with 261 points, 24 points ahead of Oliver Gavin and Tommy Milner in second, and Connor De Phillippi and Bruno Spengler in third. With 200 points, the GTD Drivers' Championship was led by Mario Farnbacher and Matt McMurry, ahead of Aaron Telitz. Cadillac, Chevrolet, and Lexus were leading their respective Manufactures' Championships while Konica Minolta Cadillac DPi-V.R, PR1/Mathiasen Motorsports, Corvette Racing, and Meyer Shank Racing with Curb-Agajanian each led their own Teams' Championships.

Felipe Nasr and Pipo Derani entered the race as defending winners.

=== Entries ===
A total of 31 cars took part in the event split across 4 classes. 8 cars were entered in DPi, 4 in LMP2, 6 in GTLM, and 13 in GTD. In DPi, Tristan Vautier replaced João Barbosa in the Mustang Sampling Racing/JDC-Miller MotorSports entry. In LMP2, Inter Europol Competition made their IMSA SportsCar Championship debut. Era Motorsport withdrew from the event after Dwight Merriman suffered a back injury at the 24 Hours of Le Mans. Mikkel Jensen replaced Ryan Dalziel in the Tower Motorsport By Starworks entry. Job van Uitert made his IMSA SportsCar Championship debut joining Mikkel Jensen and John Farano in the Tower Motorsport By Starworks entry. Colin Braun joined Matthew Bell and James McGuire in the Performance Tech Motorsports entry. In GTD, Pfaff Motorsports made their first appearance since the season opening race at Daytona. Scuderia Corsa returned after skipping the previous two rounds. Team Hardpoint expanded its campaign to include running at Petit Le Mans and the 12 Hours of Sebring. GRT Grasser Racing Team skipped the event due to a clash with the ADAC GT Masters round at the Red Bull Ring.

== Practice ==
There were three practice sessions preceding the start of the race on Saturday, all three one on Thursday. The first session on Thursday morning lasted one hour. The second session on Thursday afternoon lasted 75 minutes. The final session on Thursday evening lasted 90 minutes.

=== Practice 1 ===
The first practice session took place at 11:15 am ET on Thursday and ended with Ricky Taylor topping the charts for Acura Team Penske, with a lap time of 1:10.086. Mikkel Jensen was fastest in LMP2 with a time of 1:11.078. Laurens Vanthoor set the fastest time in GTLM with a time of 1:17.008. The GTD class was topped by the #48 Paul Miller Racing Lamborghini Huracán GT3 Evo of Bryan Sellers with a time of 1:19.946. The session was stopped for four minutes when Chris Miller, driving the #85 JDC-Miller MotorSports entry, spun at turn 5 and came to a stop facing oncoming traffic.

Pos.	Class	No.	Team	Driver	Time	Gap
1	DPi	7	Acura Team Penske	Ricky Taylor	1:10.086	_
2	DPi	77	Mazda Motorsports	Oliver Jarvis	1:10.154	+0.068
3	DPi	55	Mazda Motorsports	Jonathan Bomarito	1:10.243	+0.157

=== Practice 2 ===
The second practice session took place at 3:45 pm ET on Thursday and ended with Filipe Albuquerque topping the charts for Whelen Engineering Racing, with a lap time of 1:09.230. Simon Trummer set the fastest time in LMP2. The GTLM class topped by the #3 Corvette Racing Chevrolet Corvette C8.R of Antonio García with a time of 1:16.901. John Edwards in the #24 BMW Team RLL entry was second and Connor De Phillippi rounded out the top 3. Robby Foley set the fastest time in GTD.

Pos.	Class	No.	Team	Driver	Time	Gap
1	DPi	31	Whelen Engineering Racing	Filipe Albuquerque	1:09.230	_
2	DPi	77	Mazda Motorsports	Felipe Nasr	1:09.757	+0.527
3	DPi	10	Konica Minolta Cadillac	Tristan Nunez	1:09.860	+0.630

=== Practice 3 ===
The third and final practice session took place at 7:30 pm ET on Thursday and ended with Pipo Derani topping the charts for Whelen Engineering Racing, with a lap time of 1:10.175. Mikkel Jensen was fastest in LMP2 with a time of 1:11.195. The GTLM class topped by the #912 Porsche GT Team Porsche 911 RSR-19 of Laurens Vanthoor with a time of 1:17.252. Frederic Makowiecki in the sister #911 Porsche GT Team entry was second and Nicky Catsburg rounded out the top 3. Jack Hawksworth set the fastest time in GTD. The session was red flagged twice. 55 minutes into the session, Jakub Śmiechowski in the #51 Inter Europol Competition Oreca spun at turn 10, and got stuck in the gravel trap. 4 minutes later, Ben Keating in the #74 Riley Motorsports Mercedes-AMG GT3 Evo, spun at turn 2. Chris Miller in the #85 JDC-Miller MotorSports Cadillac DPi-V.R, went off track and collided with Keating's Mercedes. The #85 Cadillac received right-front damage and lost its rear wing while the #74 Mercedes suffered right-front damage.

Pos.	Class	No.	Team	Driver	Time	Gap
1	DPi	31	Whelen Engineering Racing	Pipo Derani	1:10.175	_
2	DPi	10	Konica Minolta Cadillac	Renger van der Zande	1:10.215	+0.040
3	DPi	6	Acura Team Penske	Dane Cameron	1:10.262	+0.087

== Qualifying ==
Friday's afternoon qualifying was broken into three sessions, with one session for the DPi and LMP2, GTLM, and GTD classes, which lasted for 15 minutes each, and a ten minute interval between the sessions. The rules dictated that all teams nominated a driver to qualify their cars, with the Pro-Am (LMP2/GTD) classes requiring a Bronze/Silver Rated Driver to qualify the car. The competitors' fastest lap times determined the starting order. IMSA then arranged the grid to put DPis ahead of the LMP2, GTLM, and GTD cars.

The first session was for cars in GTD class. Shinya Michimi qualified on pole for the class driving the No. 86 car for Meyer Shank Racing with Curb-Agajanian, besting Jeff Westphal in the Scuderia Corsa entry.

The second session was for cars in the GTLM class. Antonio García qualified on pole driving the No. 3 car for Corvette Racing, beating Connor De Phillippi in the #25 BMW Team RLL entry by less than three-tenths of a second.

The final session of qualifying was for cars in the LMP2 and DPi classes. Dane Cameron secured overall pole for the event driving the No. 6 car for Acura Team Penske, beating teammate Ricky Taylor in the sister No. 7 Acura Team Penske entry by less than one-tenth of a second. Patrick Kelly took pole in LMP2, beating Rob Hodes in the Inter Europol Competition entry.

=== Qualifying results ===
Pole positions in each class are indicated in bold and by ‡.

Pos.	Class	No.	Team	Driver	Time	Gap	Grid
1	**DPi**	**6**	**(United States) Acura Team Penske**	**(United States) Dane Cameron**	**1:08.412**	**_**	1‡
2	DPi	7	(United States) Acura Team Penske	(United States) Ricky Taylor	1:08.506	+0.094	2
3	DPi	31	(United States) Whelen Engineering Racing	(Brazil) Felipe Nasr	1:08.612	+0.200	3
4	DPi	55	(Canada) Mazda Motorsports	(United Kingdom) Harry Tincknell	1:08.636	+0.224	4
5	DPi	10	(United States) Konica Minolta Cadillac	(Australia) Ryan Briscoe	1:08.850	+0.438	5
6	DPi	77	(Canada) Mazda Motorsports	(United States) Tristan Nunez	1:08.925	+0.513	6
7	DPi	5	(United States) JDC-Mustang Sampling Racing	(France) Sébastien Bourdais	1:09.040	+0.628	7
8	DPi	85	(United States) JDC-Miller MotorSports	(France) Gabriel Aubry	1:09.229	+0.817	8
9	**LMP2**	**52**	**(United States) PR1/Mathiasen Motorsports**	**(United States) Patrick Kelly**	**1:11.590**	**+3.178**	9‡
10	LMP2	51	(Poland) Inter Europol Competition	(United States) Rob Hodes	1:13.161	+4.749	10
11	LMP2	8	(United States) Tower Motorsports by Starworks	(Canada) John Farano	1:14.082	+5.670	12^{1}
12	**GTLM**	**3**	**(United States) Corvette Racing**	**(Spain) Antonio García**	**1:15.163**	**+6.751**	13‡
13	GTLM	25	(United States) BMW Team RLL	(United States) Connor De Phillippi	1:15.434	+7.022	14
14	GTLM	24	(United States) BMW Team RLL	(United States) John Edwards	1:15.615	+7.182	15
15	GTLM	912	(United States) Porsche GT Team	(Belgium) Laurens Vanthoor	1:15.657	+7.245	16
16	GTLM	4	(United States) Corvette Racing	(United States) Tommy Milner	1:15.856	+7.444	17
17	GTLM	911	(United States) Porsche GT Team	(United Kingdom) Nick Tandy	1:15.858	+7.446	18
18	**GTD**	**86**	**(United States) Meyer Shank Racing with Curb-Agajanian**	**(Japan) Shinya Michimi**	**1:19.291**	**+10.879**	19‡
19	GTD	63	(United States) Scuderia Corsa	(United States) Jeff Westphal	1:19.464	+11.052	20
20	GTD	12	(Canada) AIM Vasser Sullivan	(United States) Frankie Montecalvo	1:19.563	+11.151	21
21	GTD	48	(United States) Paul Miller Racing	(United States) Madison Snow	1:19.567	+11.155	22
22	GTD	96	(United States) Turner Motorsport	(United States) Robby Foley	1:19.657	+11.245	23
23	GTD	57	(United States) Heinricher Racing with MSR Curb-Agajanian	(Canada) Misha Goikhberg	1:19.666	+11.254	24
24	GTD	30	(United States) Team Hardpoint	(United States) Andrew Davis	1:19.722	+11.310	25
25	GTD	9	(Canada) Pfaff Motorsports	(Canada) Zacharie Robichon	1:19.774	+11.362	26
26	GTD	14	(Canada) AIM Vasser Sullivan	(United States) Michael de Quesada	1:19.908	+11.496	27
27	GTD	16	(United States) Wright Motorsports	(United States) Ryan Hardwick	1:20.399	+11.987	28
28	GTD	23	(United States) Heart of Racing Team	(United Kingdom) Ian James	1:20.434	+12.022	31^{2}
29	GTD	44	(United States) GRT Magnus	(United States) John Potter	1:20.453	+12.041	29
30	GTD	74	(United States) Riley Motorsports	(United States) Gar Robinson	1:20.622	+12.210	30
31	LMP2	38	(United States) Performance Tech Motorsports	(United States) James McGuire	No time	_	11

- ^{1} The No. 8 Tower Motorsports by Starworks entry was moved to the back of the LMP2 field as per Article 40.1.4 of the Sporting regulations (Change of starting tires).
- ^{2} The No. 23 Heart of Racing Team entry was moved to the back of the GTD field as per Article 40.1.4 of the Sporting regulations (Change of starting tires).

== Race ==
=== Post-race ===
Helio Castroneves and Ricky Taylor advanced from third to second in the DPi Drivers' Championship. Derani dropped from second to third while Bourdais moved from fifth to fourth. The result kept Kelly atop the LMP2 Drivers' Championship. Braun advanced from eleventh to fifth. The result kept Antonio García and Jordan Taylor atop the GTLM Drivers' Championship while Edwards and Krohn advanced from fourth to third. By finishing second place, Telitz took the lead of the GTD Drivers' Championship. Farnbacher and McMurry dropped from first to fourth while Hawksworth advanced from fourth to second. Cadillac, Chevrolet, and Lexus continued to top their respective Manufacturers' Championships while Konica Minolta Cadillac DPi-V.R, PR1/Mathiasen Motorsports, and Corvette Racing kept their respective advantages in their respective of Teams' Championships. AIM Vasser Sullivan took the lead of the GTD Teams' Championship with two rounds remaining in the season.

=== Results ===
Class winners are denoted in bold and ‡.

Pos	Class	No	Team	Drivers	Chassis	Laps	Time/Retired
Pos	Class	No	Team	Drivers	Engine	Laps	Time/Retired
1	**DPi**	**10**	**(United States) Konica Minolta Cadillac**	**(Australia) Ryan Briscoe (New Zealand) Scott Dixon (Netherlands) Renger van der Zande**	**Cadillac DPi-V.R**	**460**	**10:00:22.332‡**
1	**DPi**	**10**	**(United States) Konica Minolta Cadillac**	**(Australia) Ryan Briscoe (New Zealand) Scott Dixon (Netherlands) Renger van der Zande**	**Cadillac 5.5 L V8**	**460**	**10:00:22.332‡**
2	DPi	7	(United States) Acura Team Penske	(Brazil) Hélio Castroneves (United States) Alexander Rossi (United States) Ricky Taylor	Acura ARX-05	460	+0.429
2	DPi	7	(United States) Acura Team Penske	(Brazil) Hélio Castroneves (United States) Alexander Rossi (United States) Ricky Taylor	Acura AR35TT 3.5 L Turbo V6	460	+0.429
3	DPi	6	(United States) Acura Team Penske	(United States) Dane Cameron (Colombia) Juan Pablo Montoya (France) Simon Pagenaud	Acura ARX-05	460	+1.236
3	DPi	6	(United States) Acura Team Penske	(United States) Dane Cameron (Colombia) Juan Pablo Montoya (France) Simon Pagenaud	Acura AR35TT 3.5 L Turbo V6	460	+1.236
4	DPi	5	(United States) JDC-Mustang Sampling Racing	(France) Sébastien Bourdais (France) Loïc Duval (France) Tristan Vautier	Cadillac DPi-V.R	460	+3.700
4	DPi	5	(United States) JDC-Mustang Sampling Racing	(France) Sébastien Bourdais (France) Loïc Duval (France) Tristan Vautier	Cadillac 5.5 L V8	460	+3.700
5	DPi	31	(United States) Whelen Engineering Racing	(Portugal) Filipe Albuquerque (Brazil) Pipo Derani (Brazil) Felipe Nasr	Cadillac DPi-V.R	458	+2 Laps
5	DPi	31	(United States) Whelen Engineering Racing	(Portugal) Filipe Albuquerque (Brazil) Pipo Derani (Brazil) Felipe Nasr	Cadillac 5.5 L V8	458	+2 Laps
6	**LMP2**	**8**	**(United States) Tower Motorsports by Starworks**	**(Canada) John Farano (Denmark) Mikkel Jensen (Netherlands) Job van Uitert**	**Oreca 07**	**450**	**+10 Laps‡**
6	**LMP2**	**8**	**(United States) Tower Motorsports by Starworks**	**(Canada) John Farano (Denmark) Mikkel Jensen (Netherlands) Job van Uitert**	**Gibson GK428 4.2 L V8**	**450**	**+10 Laps‡**
7	LMP2	38	(United States) Performance Tech Motorsports	(United Kingdom) Matthew Bell (United States) Colin Braun (United States) James McGuire	Oreca 07	445	+15 Laps
7	LMP2	38	(United States) Performance Tech Motorsports	(United Kingdom) Matthew Bell (United States) Colin Braun (United States) James McGuire	Gibson GK428 4.2 L V8	445	+15 Laps
8	DPi	55	(Canada) Mazda Motorsports	(United States) Jonathan Bomarito (United States) Ryan Hunter-Reay (United Kingdom) Harry Tincknell	Mazda RT24-P	441	+19 Laps
8	DPi	55	(Canada) Mazda Motorsports	(United States) Jonathan Bomarito (United States) Ryan Hunter-Reay (United Kingdom) Harry Tincknell	Mazda MZ-2.0T 2.0 L Turbo I4	441	+19 Laps
9	LMP2	51	(Poland) Inter Europol Competition	(United States) Rob Hodes (United States) Austin McCusker (Poland) Jakub Śmiechowski	Oreca 07	441	+19 Laps
9	LMP2	51	(Poland) Inter Europol Competition	(United States) Rob Hodes (United States) Austin McCusker (Poland) Jakub Śmiechowski	Gibson GK428 4.2 L V8	441	+19 Laps
10	**GTLM**	**911**	**(United States) Porsche GT Team**	**(Australia) Matt Campbell (France) Frederic Makowiecki (United Kingdom) Nick Tandy**	**Porsche 911 RSR-19**	**431**	**+29 Laps‡**
10	**GTLM**	**911**	**(United States) Porsche GT Team**	**(Australia) Matt Campbell (France) Frederic Makowiecki (United Kingdom) Nick Tandy**	**Porsche 4.2 L Flat-6**	**431**	**+29 Laps‡**
11	GTLM	3	(United States) Corvette Racing	(Netherlands) Nicky Catsburg (Spain) Antonio García (United States) Jordan Taylor	Chevrolet Corvette C8.R	431	+29 Laps
11	GTLM	3	(United States) Corvette Racing	(Netherlands) Nicky Catsburg (Spain) Antonio García (United States) Jordan Taylor	Chevrolet 5.5 L V8	431	+29 Laps
12	GTLM	24	(United States) BMW Team RLL	(United States) John Edwards (Brazil) Augusto Farfus (Finland) Jesse Krohn	BMW M8 GTE	431	+29 Laps
12	GTLM	24	(United States) BMW Team RLL	(United States) John Edwards (Brazil) Augusto Farfus (Finland) Jesse Krohn	BMW S63 4.0 L Turbo V8	431	+29 Laps
13	GTLM	4	(United States) Corvette Racing	(Switzerland) Marcel Fässler (United Kingdom) Oliver Gavin (United States) Tommy Milner	Chevrolet Corvette C8.R	431	+29 Laps
13	GTLM	4	(United States) Corvette Racing	(Switzerland) Marcel Fässler (United Kingdom) Oliver Gavin (United States) Tommy Milner	Chevrolet 5.5 L V8	431	+29 Laps
14 DNF	GTLM	912	(United States) Porsche GT Team	(New Zealand) Earl Bamber (France) Mathieu Jaminet (Belgium) Laurens Vanthoor	Porsche 911 RSR-19	429	crash
14 DNF	GTLM	912	(United States) Porsche GT Team	(New Zealand) Earl Bamber (France) Mathieu Jaminet (Belgium) Laurens Vanthoor	Porsche 4.2 L Flat-6	429	crash
15	DPi	77	(Canada) Mazda Motorsports	(United Kingdom) Oliver Jarvis (United States) Tristan Nunez (France) Olivier Pla	Mazda RT24-P	427	+33 Laps
15	DPi	77	(Canada) Mazda Motorsports	(United Kingdom) Oliver Jarvis (United States) Tristan Nunez (France) Olivier Pla	Mazda MZ-2.0T 2.0 L Turbo I4	427	+33 Laps
16 DNF	LMP2	52	(United States) PR1/Mathiasen Motorsports	(United States) Scott Huffaker (United States) Patrick Kelly (Switzerland) Simon Trummer	Oreca 07	418	suspension
16 DNF	LMP2	52	(United States) PR1/Mathiasen Motorsports	(United States) Scott Huffaker (United States) Patrick Kelly (Switzerland) Simon Trummer	Gibson GK428 4.2 L V8	418	suspension
17	**GTD**	**63**	**(United States) Scuderia Corsa**	**(Italy) Alessandro Balzan (United States) Cooper MacNeil (United States) Jeff Westphal**	**Ferrari 488 GT3**	**413**	**+47 Laps‡**
17	**GTD**	**63**	**(United States) Scuderia Corsa**	**(Italy) Alessandro Balzan (United States) Cooper MacNeil (United States) Jeff Westphal**	**Ferrari F154CB 3.9 L Turbo V8**	**413**	**+47 Laps‡**
18	GTD	14	(Canada) AIM Vasser Sullivan	(United Kingdom) Jack Hawksworth (United States) Michael de Quesada (United States) Aaron Telitz	Lexus RC F GT3	413	+47 Laps
18	GTD	14	(Canada) AIM Vasser Sullivan	(United Kingdom) Jack Hawksworth (United States) Michael de Quesada (United States) Aaron Telitz	Lexus 5.0 L V8	413	+47 Laps
19	GTD	44	(United States) GRT Magnus	(United States) Andy Lally (United States) John Potter (United States) Spencer Pumpelly	Lamborghini Huracán GT3 Evo	413	+47 Laps
19	GTD	44	(United States) GRT Magnus	(United States) Andy Lally (United States) John Potter (United States) Spencer Pumpelly	Lamborghini 5.2 L V10	413	+47 Laps
20	GTD	16	(United States) Wright Motorsports	(United States) Ryan Hardwick (Belgium) Jan Heylen (United States) Patrick Long	Porsche 911 GT3 R	413	+47 Laps
20	GTD	16	(United States) Wright Motorsports	(United States) Ryan Hardwick (Belgium) Jan Heylen (United States) Patrick Long	Porsche 4.0 L Flat-6	413	+47 Laps
21	GTD	9	(Canada) Pfaff Motorsports	(Germany) Lars Kern (Norway) Dennis Olsen (Canada) Zacharie Robichon	Porsche 911 GT3 R	413	+47 Laps
21	GTD	9	(Canada) Pfaff Motorsports	(Germany) Lars Kern (Norway) Dennis Olsen (Canada) Zacharie Robichon	Porsche 4.0 L Flat-6	413	+47 Laps
22	GTD	57	(United States) Heinricher Racing with MSR Curb-Agajanian	(Canada) Mikhail Goikhberg (United States) Trent Hindman (Portugal) Álvaro Parente	Acura NSX GT3 Evo	413	+47 Laps
22	GTD	57	(United States) Heinricher Racing with MSR Curb-Agajanian	(Canada) Mikhail Goikhberg (United States) Trent Hindman (Portugal) Álvaro Parente	Acura 3.5 L Turbo V6	413	+47 Laps
23	GTD	48	(United States) Paul Miller Racing	(United States) Corey Lewis (United States) Bryan Sellers (United States) Madison Snow	Lamborghini Huracán GT3 Evo	413	+47 Laps
23	GTD	48	(United States) Paul Miller Racing	(United States) Corey Lewis (United States) Bryan Sellers (United States) Madison Snow	Lamborghini 5.2 L V10	413	+47 Laps
24 DNF	GTD	12	(Canada) AIM Vasser Sullivan	(United States) Townsend Bell (United States) Kyle Kirkwood (United States) Frankie Montecalvo	Lexus RC F GT3	410	crash
24 DNF	GTD	12	(Canada) AIM Vasser Sullivan	(United States) Townsend Bell (United States) Kyle Kirkwood (United States) Frankie Montecalvo	Lexus 5.0 L V8	410	crash
25	GTD	96	(United States) Turner Motorsport	(United States) Bill Auberlen (United States) Robby Foley (United States) Dillon Machavern	BMW M6 GT3	408	+52 Laps
25	GTD	96	(United States) Turner Motorsport	(United States) Bill Auberlen (United States) Robby Foley (United States) Dillon Machavern	BMW 4.4 L Turbo V8	408	+52 Laps
26	DPi	85	(United States) JDC-Miller MotorSports	(France) Gabriel Aubry (Brazil) Matheus Leist (United States) Chris Miller	Cadillac DPi-V.R	406	+54 Laps
26	DPi	85	(United States) JDC-Miller MotorSports	(France) Gabriel Aubry (Brazil) Matheus Leist (United States) Chris Miller	Cadillac 5.5 L V8	406	+54 Laps
27	GTLM	25	(United States) BMW Team RLL	(United States) Connor De Phillippi (United States) Colton Herta (Canada) Bruno Spengler	BMW M8 GTE	399	+61 Laps
27	GTLM	25	(United States) BMW Team RLL	(United States) Connor De Phillippi (United States) Colton Herta (Canada) Bruno Spengler	BMW S63 4.0 L Turbo V8	399	+61 Laps
28	GTD	86	(United States) Meyer Shank Racing with Curb-Agajanian	(Germany) Mario Farnbacher (United States) Matt McMurry (Japan) Shinya Michimi	Acura NSX GT3 Evo	399	+61 Laps
28	GTD	86	(United States) Meyer Shank Racing with Curb-Agajanian	(Germany) Mario Farnbacher (United States) Matt McMurry (Japan) Shinya Michimi	Acura 3.5 L Turbo V6	399	+61 Laps
29 DNF	GTD	23	(United States) Heart of Racing Team	(Canada) Roman De Angelis (United Kingdom) Ian James (United Kingdom) Darren Turner	Aston Martin Vantage AMR GT3	297	crash damage
29 DNF	GTD	23	(United States) Heart of Racing Team	(Canada) Roman De Angelis (United Kingdom) Ian James (United Kingdom) Darren Turner	Aston Martin 4.0 L Turbo V8	297	crash damage
30 DNF	GTD	74	(United States) Riley Motorsports	(United States) Lawson Aschenbach (United States) Ben Keating (United States) Gar Robinson	Mercedes-AMG GT3 Evo	268	engine
30 DNF	GTD	74	(United States) Riley Motorsports	(United States) Lawson Aschenbach (United States) Ben Keating (United States) Gar Robinson	Mercedes-AMG M159 6.2 L V8	268	engine
31 DNF	GTD	30	(United States) Team Hardpoint	(United States) Andrew Davis (United States) Robert Ferriol (Germany) Marcus Winkelhock	Audi R8 LMS Evo	258	mechanical
31 DNF	GTD	30	(United States) Team Hardpoint	(United States) Andrew Davis (United States) Robert Ferriol (Germany) Marcus Winkelhock	Audi 5.2 L V10	258	mechanical

== Standings after the race ==
DPi Drivers' Championship standings
Pos.	+/–	Driver	Points
1		(Australia) Ryan Briscoe (Netherlands) Renger van der Zande	215
2	1	(Brazil) Helio Castroneves (United States) Ricky Taylor	207
3	1	(Brazil) Pipo Derani	203
4	1	(France) Sébastien Bourdais	199
5	1	(United States) Jonathan Bomarito (United Kingdom) Harry Tincknell	197

LMP2 Drivers' Championship standings
Pos.	+/–	Driver	Points
1		(United States) Patrick Kelly	126
2		(United States) Dwight Merriman (United Kingdom) Kyle Tilley	92
3	1	(Switzerland) Simon Trummer	91
4	1	(Canada) Cameron Cassels	64
5	6	(United States) Colin Braun	64

GTLM Drivers' Championship standings
Pos.	+/–	Driver	Points
1		(Spain) Antonio García (United States) Jordan Taylor	293
2		(United Kingdom) Oliver Gavin (United States) Tommy Milner	265
3	1	(United States) John Edwards (Finland) Jesse Krohn	261
4	1	(United States) Connor De Phillippi (Canada) Bruno Spengler	259
5		(France) Frédéric Makowiecki (United Kingdom) Nick Tandy	232

GTD Drivers' Championship standings
Pos.	+/–	Driver	Points
1	1	(United States) Aaron Telitz	228
2	2	(United Kingdom) Jack Hawksworth	226
3		(United States) Ryan Hardwick (United States) Patrick Long	224
4	3	(Germany) Mario Farnbacher (United States) Matt McMurry	221
5		(United States) Townsend Bell	206

- Note: Only the top five positions are included for all sets of standings.

DPi Teams' Championship standings
Pos.	+/–	Team	Points
1		(United States) #10 Konica Minolta Cadillac DPi-V.R	215
2	1	(United States) #7 Acura Team Penske	207
3	1	(United States) #31 Whelen Engineering Racing	203
4	1	(United States) #5 Mustang Sampling Racing / JDC-Miller MotorSports	199
5	1	(Canada) #55 Mazda Motorsports	197

LMP2 Teams' Championship standings
Pos.	+/–	Team	Points
1		(United States) #52 PR1/Mathiasen Motorsports	126
2	1	(United States) #38 Performance Tech Motorsports	96
3	1	(United States) #18 Era Motorsport	92
4	1	(United States) #8 Tower Motorsport by Starworks	63
5	1	(United States) #81 DragonSpeed USA	61

GTLM Teams' Championship standings
Pos.	+/–	Team	Points
1		(United States) #3 Corvette Racing	293
2		(United States) #4 Corvette Racing	265
3	1	(United States) #24 BMW Team RLL	261
4	1	(United States) #25 BMW Team RLL	259
5		(United States) #911 Porsche GT Team	232

GTD Teams' Championship standings
Pos.	+/–	Team	Points
1	2	(Canada) #14 AIM Vasser Sullivan	226
2		(United States) #16 Wright Motorsports	224
3	2	(United States) #86 Meyer Shank Racing with Curb-Agajanian	221
4		(Canada) #12 AIM Vasser Sullivan	206
5		(United States) #96 Turner Motorsport	204

- Note: Only the top five positions are included for all sets of standings.

DPi Manufacturers' Championship standings
Pos.	+/–	Manufacturer	Points
1		(United States) Cadillac	231
2		(Japan) Acura	227
3		(Japan) Mazda	221

GTLM Manufacturers' Championship standings
Pos.	+/–	Manufacturer	Points
1		(United States) Chevrolet	304
2		(Germany) BMW	288
3		(Germany) Porsche	251
4		(Italy) Ferrari	28

GTD Manufacturers' Championship standings
Pos.	+/–	Manufacturer	Points
1		(Japan) Lexus	243
2		(Japan) Acura	234
3		(Germany) Porsche	230
4		(Germany) BMW	219
5	1	(Italy) Lamborghini	217

- Note: Only the top five positions are included for all sets of standings.

IMSA SportsCar Championship
Previous race: 2020 MOTUL 100% Synthetic Grand Prix	2020 season	Next race: 2020 Hyundai Monterey Sports Car Championship
