= Pfaff Motorsports =

Canadian auto racing team

- Nation: Canada
- Founder(s): Chris Pfaff
- Former names: Pfaff Motor
- Base: Toronto, Canada
- Team principal(s): Steve Bortolotti
- Current series: IMSA Sportscar Championship
- Former series: Sports Car Championship Canada; Canadian Touring Car Championship; SprintX GT Championship Series; Pirelli World Challenge; IMSA GT3 Cup Challenge Canada
- Current drivers: IMSA SportsCar Championship: 9.: (Italy) Andrea Caldarelli (United Kingdom) Sandy Mitchell (Canada) James Hinchcliffe (Italy) Mirko Bortolotti (France) Franck Perera
- Website: https://pfaffmotorsports.com

Pfaff Motorsports is a Canadian sports car racing team based in Toronto that currently competes in the GTD Pro class of the IMSA SportsCar Championship. The team began racing in the Rothmans Porsche Challenge in 1986, winning the championship in 1988 with Scott Goodyear. The Pfaff Group brought Pfaff Motorsports in-house in 2014.

== Background ==
Current president and CEO of Pfaff Automotive Partners Chris Pfaff, who assumed control in 1986, is the son of the founder Hans J. Pfaff, who created the Volkswagen dealership H.J. Pfaff Motors in 1964, adding Porsche in 1966. General Manager Steve Bortolotti held a role in Pfaff Tuning before assuming his current role as GM of Motorsport.

The team joined the IMSA WeatherTech SportsCar Championship in 2019, following a more than 50 year history in North American Cup-class racing. The Pfaff Group brought Pfaff Motorsports in-house in 2014 and appointed General Manager Steve Bortolotti in February 2015. In 2016 President and CEO of Pfaff Automotive Partners Chris Pfaff was inducted into the Canadian Motorsport Hall of Fame for the role he has played in the development of a long list of notable Canadian racers.

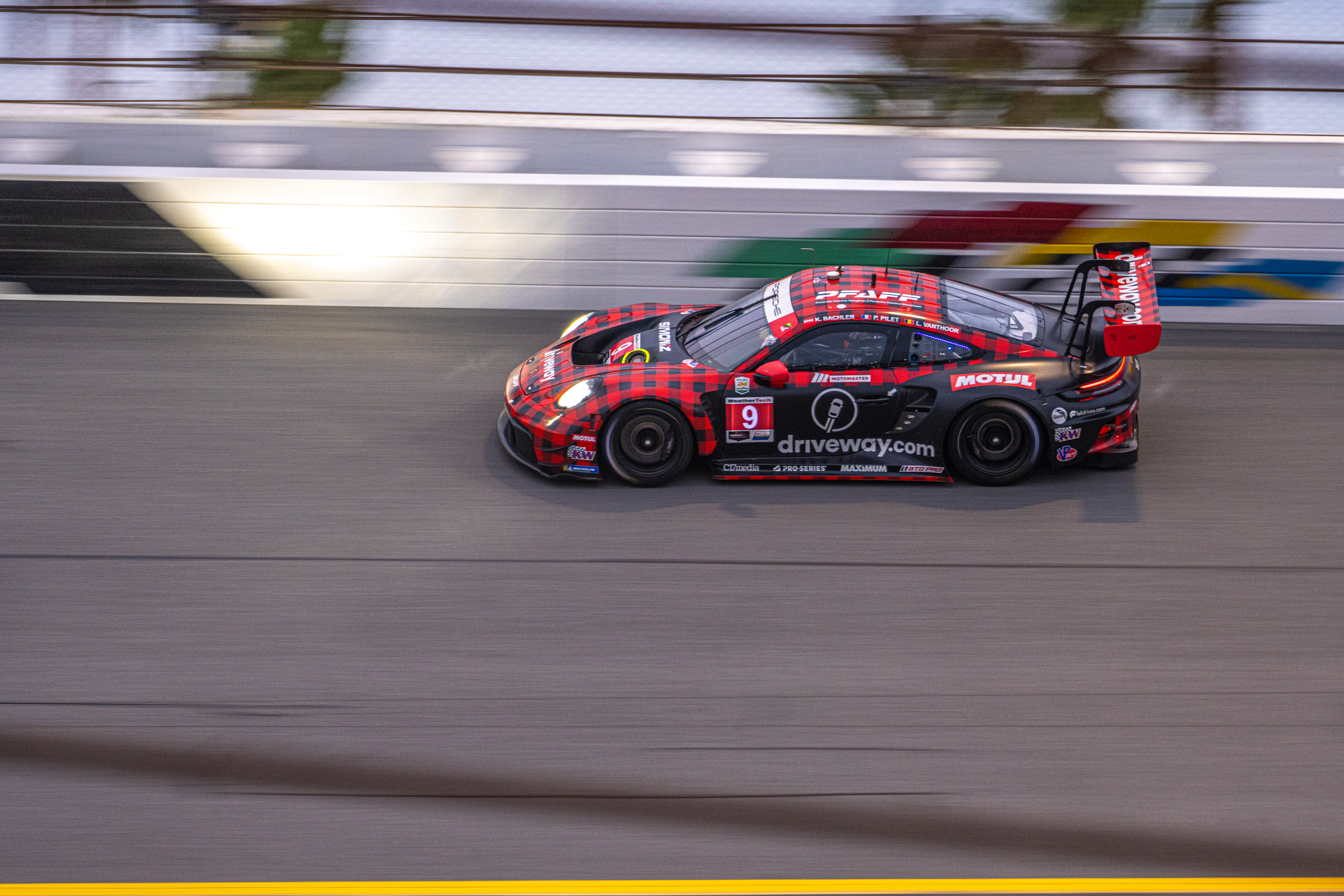
Pfaff Motorsport's Porsche 992 GT3 R at Daytona International Speedway

== History ==
Pfaff Motors campaigned a Porsche 944 in the inaugural Rothmans Porsche Challenge in 1986, and remained with the series until it ended in 1990, with Scott Goodyear winning the championship for the team in 1988.

Pfaff entered the one-make series Ultra 94 Porsche GT3 Cup Canada from 2012 until the series ended in 2019. However, when that series was replaced by Porsche Carrera Cup North America in 2021, Pfaff had already moved to international racing in the IMSA SportsCar Championship.

Pfaff joined the Pirelli World Challenge in 2018, with factory drivers and support from Porsche Motorsport NA, including reigning Cup Challenge Canada champion of 2017 Scott Hargrove moving across to that entry. The team also fielded an entry in the supporting GT4 class.

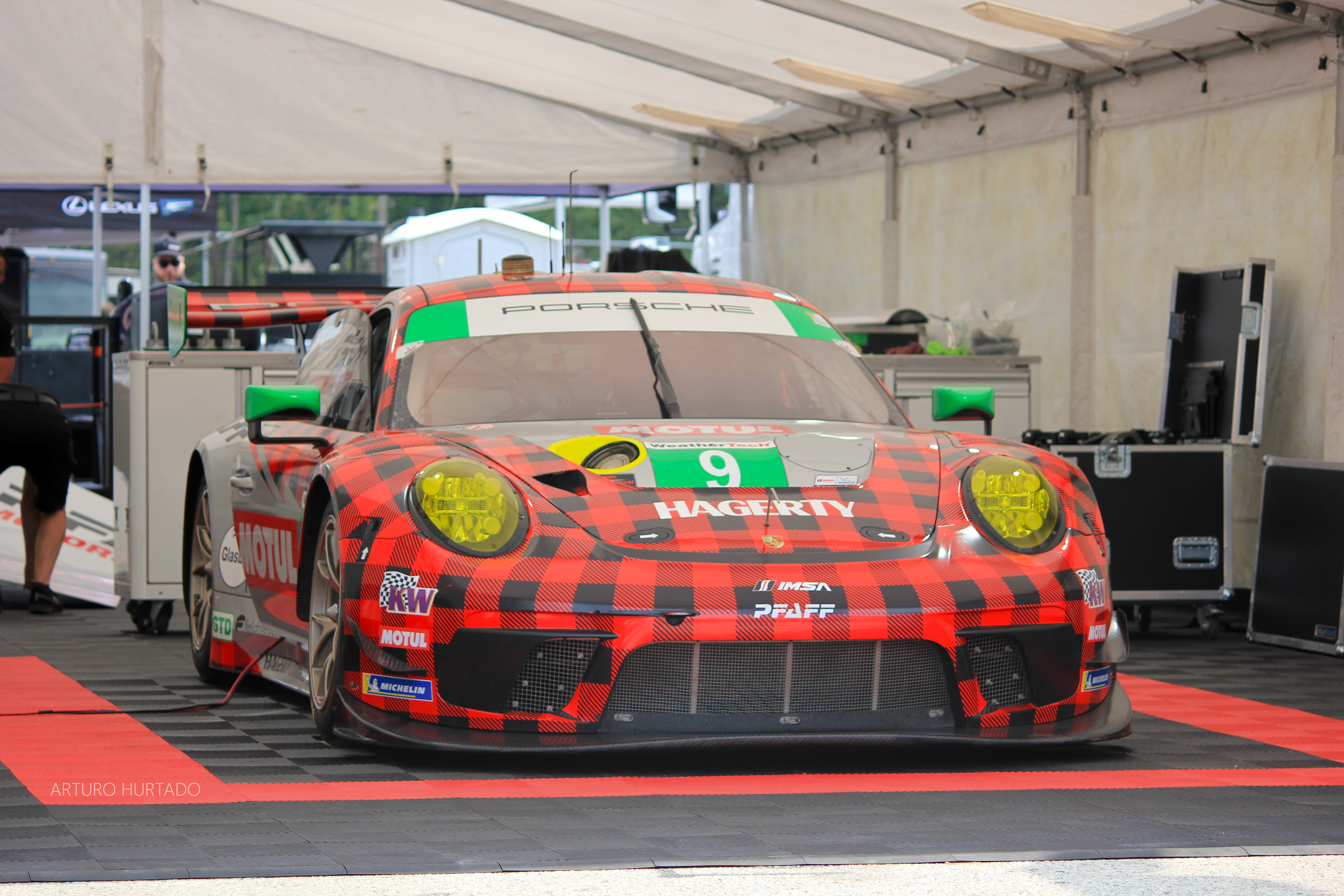
Pfaff Motorsports in Plaid livery at IWSC Road America round in 2021

From 2019 on, Pfaff have campaigned in the IMSA Sportscar Championship, including the 24 Hours of Daytona, with a Porsche 911 GT3 R. Pfaff's North American racing in 2020 was heavily affected by the impact of the COVID-19 pandemic. Pfaff ran in that season's 2020 24 Hours of Daytona but were otherwise only able to enter the Petit Le Mans round, and missed the remainder of the rearranged rounds. The team, and commercial partners, competed in the domestic Canadian Touring Car Championship instead, using the experienced IMSA driver Zacharie Robichon in a coaching role with young driver Zachary Vanier. The 17-year old secured the championship title with Pfaff.

Pfaff appeared in a red and black "Plaid Porsche" livery from 2019 to 2023. The idea started as a joke in the workshop; the car for the 2020 24 Hours of Daytona arrived late, forcing the team had to work over the Christmas holiday period in order to meet logistics deadlines. Many of the mechanics arrived to work on the car wearing plaid shirts and marketing director Laurence Yap suggested wrapping the car in plaid, with the design doubling as a symbol of Canadian pride.

On Oct 9, 2023, Pfaff Motorsportsannounced a switch to McLaren, campaigning a 720S GT3 Evo as an official manufacturer nominated entry to the GTD Pro class in the IMSA WeatherTech SportsCar Championship. This included a switch away from the full plaid livery, instead creating a "ghost plaid" within a livery aligned with McLaren's "papaya and blue," according to designers Dakins Design.

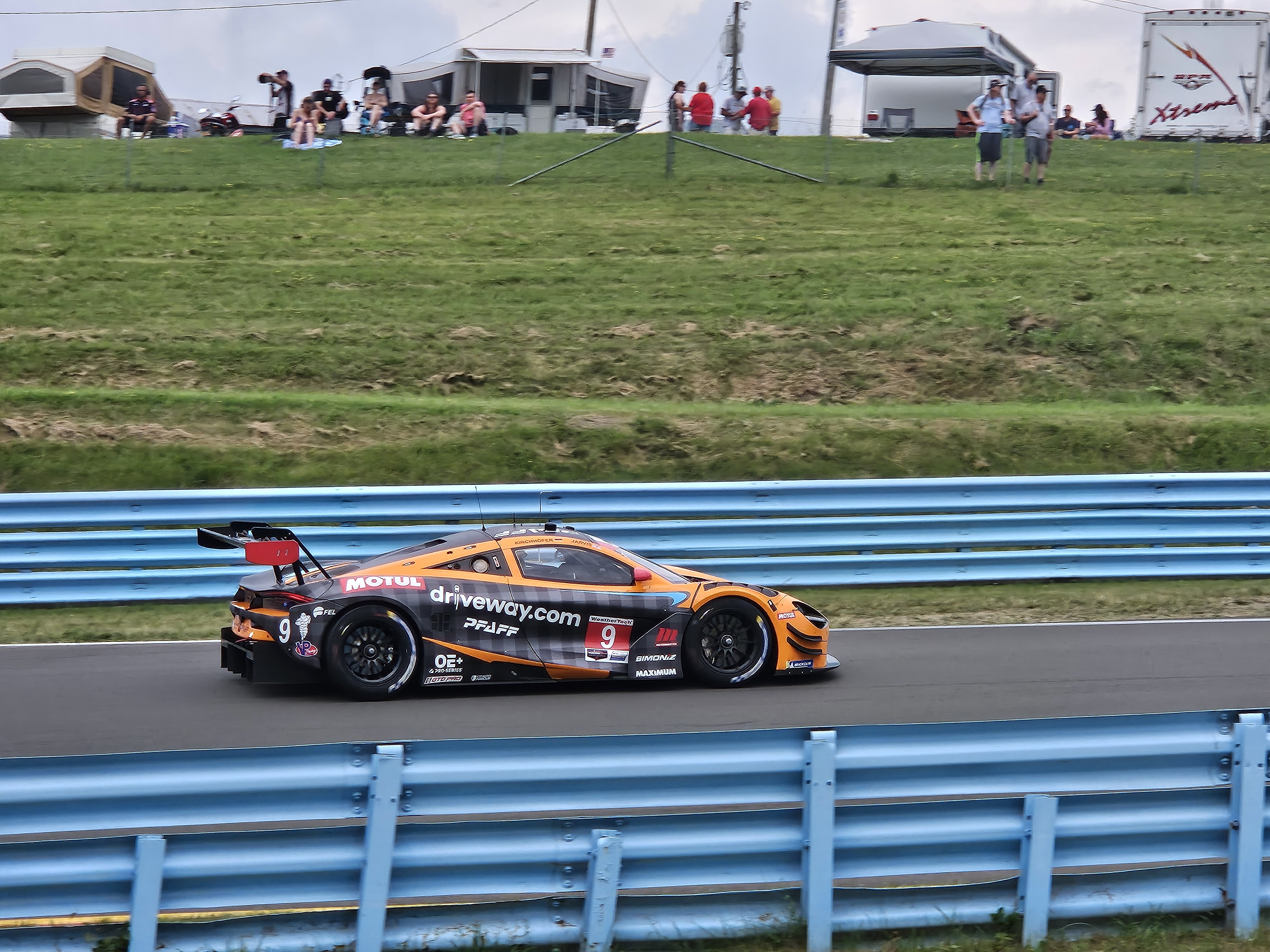
Pfaff Motorsports in Ghost Plaid livery at IWSC Watkin's Glen round in 2024

Note: the Pfaff businesses have a more recent McLaren relationship in addition to the founding Porsche relationship, and have previously campaigned McLaren GT4 chassis with IMSA.

In 2025, Pfaff switched manufacturers again, purchasing a Lamborghini Huracán GT3 Evo 2 to continue competing in the GTD Pro class in IMSA. With the switch to Lamborghini, the team also reverted back to their popular full plaid livery that they had previously used with Porsche.

On August 3, 2026, Pfaff motorsports announced they would withdraw from the IMSA SportsCar Championship at season's end after running the new Lamborghini Temerario GT3 in GTD Pro. The Pfaff Group had recently purchased Canadian Tire Motorsport Park and wanted to focus energy on redeveloping the track as well as providing additional development opportunities for younger Canadian drivers. Their final IMSA season was a successful one, with back-to-back victories at Road America and Virginia International Raceway helping the #9 car reach second place in the final GTD Pro standings. The win at Road America also served as the first-ever official win for the Temerario GT3 in a major racing series (while the Temerario had twice taken the checkers that year in the DTM series, both wins were later vacated due to on-track or tech inspection penalties).

== Racing record ==
=== Complete IMSA SportsCar Championship results ===
(key) Races in bold indicates pole position. Races in italics indicates fastest lap.url

| Year | Entrant | Class | No. | Chassis | Engine | Drivers | Rds. | Rounds | | | | | | | | | | | | MEC | Pts. | Pos. |
| Year | Entrant | Class | No. | Chassis | Engine | Drivers | Rds. | 1 | 2 | 3 | 4 | 5 | 6 | 7 | 8 | 9 | 10 | 11 | 12 | MEC | Pts. | Pos. |
|---|---|---|---|---|---|---|---|---|---|---|---|---|---|---|---|---|---|---|---|---|---|---|
| 2019 | (Canada) Pfaff Motorsports | GTD | 9 | Porsche 911 GT3 R | Porsche 4.0 L Flat-6 | (Canada) Scott Hargrove (Canada) Zacharie Robichon (Germany) Lars Kern (Norway) Dennis Olsen (Australia) Matt Campbell | 1-4, 6-7, 10-12; 1-4, 6-12; 1-2, 6, 12; 1, 8; 9 | DAY; 16 | SEB; 10 | | MOH; 12 | BEL | WGL; 6 | MOS; 5 | LIM; 1 | ELK; 1 | VIR; **4** | LGA; 4 | ATL; 3 | 29 | 262 | 3rd |
| 2020 | (Canada) Pfaff Motorsports | GTD | 9 | Porsche 911 GT3 R | Porsche 4.0 L Flat-6 | (Germany) Lars Kern (Norway) Dennis Olsen (Canada) Zacharie Robichon (France) Patrick Pilet | 1, 9; 1,9; 1,9; 1 | **DAY1**; 13 | DAY2 | SEB1 | ELK | VIR | ATL1 | MOH | CLT | ATL2; 5 | LGA | SEB2 | | 14 | 44 | 16th |
| 2021 | (Canada) Pfaff Motorsports | GTD | 9 | Porsche 911 GT3 R | Porsche 4.0 L Flat-6 | (Canada) Zacharie Robichon (Belgium) Laurens Vanthoor (Germany) Lars Kern (Australia) Matt Campbell | 1-3, 5, 7-12; 1-3, 5, 7-12; 1-2, 5, 12; 1 | DAY; 12 | SEB; 1 | MOH; 6 | DET | WGL1; 7 | WGL2 | LIM; 4 | ELK; 1 | LGA; 1 | LBH; 2 | VIR; 1 | ATL; 2 | 38 | 3284 | 1st |
| 2022 | (Canada) Pfaff Motorsports | GTD Pro | 9 | Porsche 911 GT3 R | Porsche 4.0 L Flat-6 | (Australia) Matt Campbell (France) Mathieu Jaminet (Brazil) Felipe Nasr | All; All; 1-2, 11 | DAY; 1 | SEB; 5 | LBH; 5 | **LGA**; **1** | | WGL; 3 | **MOS**; **1** | **LIM**; **1** | ELK; 2 | VIR; 1 | ATL; 3 | | 33 | 3497 | 1st |
| 2023 | (Canada) Pfaff Motorsports | GTD Pro | 9 | Porsche 911 GT3 R (992) | Porsche M97/80 4.2 L Flat-6 | (Austria) Klaus Bachler (France) Patrick Pilet (Belgium) Laurens Vanthoor (France) Kévin Estre | All; All; 1-2; 11 | DAY; 5 | SEB; 1 | LBH; 3 | LGA; 3 | WGL; 5 | MOS; 2 | LIM; 3 | ELK; 4 | VIR; 3 | **IMS**; **4** | ATL; 2 | | 33 | 3578 | 4th |
| 2024 | (Canada) Pfaff Motorsports | GTD Pro | 9 | McLaren 720S GT3 Evo | McLaren M840T 4.0 L Turbo V8 | (United Kingdom) Oliver Jarvis (Germany) Marvin Kirchhöfer (Canada) James Hinchcliffe (United States) Alexander Rossi | All; All; 1-2, 11; 1 | DAY; 10 | SEB; 12 | | LGA; 2 | DET; 8 | WGL; 2 | MOS; 6 | ELK; 7 | VIR; 5 | IMS; 10 | ATL; 9 | | 30 | 2689 | 7th |
| 2025 | (Canada) Pfaff Motorsports | GTD Pro | 9 | Lamborghini Huracán GT3 Evo 2 | Lamborghini DGF 5.2 L V10 | (Italy) Andrea Caldarelli (Italy) Marco Mapelli (Canada) James Hinchcliffe (South Africa) Jordan Pepper (United Kingdom) Sandy Mitchell | All; 1-5, 7-11; 1-2, 11; 1; 6 | DAY; 13 | SEB; 10 | | LGA; 4 | DET; 3 | WGL; **9** | MOS; 5 | ELK; 6 | VIR; 9 | IMS; 9 | ATL; 10 | | 28 | 2580 | 9th |
| 2026 | (Canada) Pfaff Motorsports | GTD Pro | 9 | Lamborghini Huracán GT3 Evo 2 | Lamborghini DGF 5.2 L V10 | (Italy) Andrea Caldarelli (United Kingdom) Sandy Mitchell (Canada) James Hinchcliffe (Italy) Mirko Bortolotti (France) Franck Perera | All; All; 1; 1; 2, 11 | DAY; 6 | | | | | | | | | | | | 31 | 2979 | 2nd |
| 2026 | (Canada) Pfaff Motorsports | GTD Pro | 9 | Lamborghini Temerario GT3 | Lamborghini L411 4.0 L V8 | (Italy) Andrea Caldarelli (United Kingdom) Sandy Mitchell (Canada) James Hinchcliffe (Italy) Mirko Bortolotti (France) Franck Perera | All; All; 1; 1; 2, 11 | | SEB; 10 | | LGA; 5 | DET; 2 | WGL; 9 | MOS; 8 | ELK; 1 | VIR; 1 | IMS; 3 | ATL; 4 | | 31 | 2979 | 2nd |
| 2026 | (Canada) Pfaff Motorsports | GTD | 46 | Lamborghini Temerario GT3 | Lamborghini L411 4.0 L V8 | (Italy) Andrea Caldarelli (Canada) Zachary Vanier | 3; 3 | DAY | SEB | LBH; 14 | LGA | | WGL | MOS | ELK | VIR | IMS | ATL | | 0 | 193 | 23rd |

* - Season still in progress
