= Zacharie Robichon =

Canadian motor racing driver (born 1992)

- Robichon at Le Mans in 2022
- Nationality: (Canada) Canadian
- Born: Zacharie Richard Robichon; May 31, 1992 (age 34) Ottawa, Ontario, Canada

IMSA career
- Debut season: 2019
- Current team: Wright Motorsports
- Categorisation: FIA Silver
- Car number: 16
- Former teams: Pfaff Motorsports
- Starts: 26
- Wins: 7
- Poles: 3
- Fastest laps: 0
- Best finish: 1st in 2021

Previous series
- 2018 2016–2017 2015 2015 2014 2013: Ultra 94 GT3 Cup Challenge Canada by Yokohama; Ultra 94 Porsche GT3 Cup Canada; F2000; F1600; Can Am Cup; Toyo Tires F1600 Championship Series - Class A

Championship titles
- 2021 2015: IMSA SportsCar Championship - GTD; Can Am Cup

Zacharie Richard Robichon (born May 31, 1992) is a Canadian sportscar racer, who competes in the IMSA SportsCar Championship for Heart of Racing and in the FIA World Endurance Championship with Proton Competition.

== Career ==
=== Karting ===
Robichon got his passion for car racing growing up came from his father who raced Formula cars in the 70s and 80s.

Robichon began karting at 14 years of age and didn't enter a full season of competition until 2009 when he began racing in the Canadian National Karting Championships, Rotax Senior class.In September 2011, Robichon beat seven other karters to win the third "Hinchtown.com Canadian Karting Award" sponsored by IndyCar driver James Hinchcliffe. The prize was a fully-paid, three-day "Wheel to Wheel" race licensing course at the Bridgestone Racing Academy.

=== F1600 ===
After competing for Canada in the annual Formula Ford Festival, Robichon moved to Formula 1600 after his father agreed to fund one season on the condition that he find sponsors to pay for subsequent years. In 2014, he competed in both the Quebec-based Toyo Tires Formula Tour 1600 and Ontario-based Toyo Tires F1600 Championship Series Class A with BGR Team Grote, as well as two races in the 2014 F2000 Championship Series. He took two podiums in four starts in the Formula Four and one win and three podiums in eight starts in the F1600 Championship Series.

In September, Robichon won the Can-Am Cup in a photo finish, catching leader Tristan DeGrand at the last turn on the final lap and then out-dragging his rival to the finish line.

In 2015, Robichon joined Brian Graham Racing and finished second overall in the Toyo Tires F1600 Championship "class A" Series, with three wins, eight podiums and five poles in eight starts. While racing in F1600, Robichon also worked as an engineer and mechanic for other drivers.

=== Porsche GT3 Cup ===
After three seasons of Formula 1600, Robichon made the switch to sportscars, racing in the Ultra 94 Porsche GT 3 Canada Series for Mark Motors Racing in Ottawa in 2016.

Robichon raced for three seasons in the Ultra 94 Porsche GT3 Cup Canada finishing third overall in 2016, with two wins and 10 podiums in 12 starts. He also started two races in the 2016 Porsche GT3 Cup Challenge USA scoring one podium for Mark Motors Racing.

Robichon returned to Ultra 94 Porsche GT3 Cup Canada with Mark Motors in 2017, taking second overall with two wins, 11 podiums and one pole in 12 races.

Robichon dominated the 2018 Ultra 94 GT3 Cup Challenge Canada by Yokohama on his way to the title, taking 11 wins, 12 podiums and nine poles in 12 starts. In August, Robichon got an emergency call while participating in a ride along event at Canadian Tire Motorsport Park from the Moorespeed team which needed a replacement driver for the Porsche GT3 Challenge USA race at Road America. Robichon swept both races that weekend

In all, Robichon started eight Porsche GT3 Challenge USA races for Moorespeed in 2018, finishing taking home seven wins, seven podiums and eight poles. He finished 12th overall despite starting only half the races.

=== IMSA SportsCar Championship ===
In 2019, Robichon teamed with fellow Canadian Scott Hargrove at Pfaff Motorsports in the IMSA SportsCar Championship GTD class, driving a Porsche 911 GT3 R to third overall, with wins in the 2019 Northeast Grand Prix and the 2019 Road Race Showcase at Road America.

Although the plan for 2020 was to challenge for the GTD title, it got derailed due to COVID-19 pandemic. Robichon's full-time teammates for the season were Lars Kern and Dennis Olsen. In addition, Patrick Pilet joining the squad for the 24 Hours of Daytona.

Pfaff Motorsoport's Toronto base combined with border restrictions made competing in a full season impossible. In the end, Robichon only started two races in GTD, the pre-COVID 2020 24 Hours of Daytona where Pfaff started on pole but finished 13th. In its other start in 2020, the team finished fifth in the 2020 IMSA SportsCar Weekend at Road America.

With Pfaff Motorsport Porsche's plaid livery quickly becoming a fan favorite, the team arrived at the 2020 season opening Rolex 24 at Daytona with custom race suits that made the driver look like lumberjacks wearing plaid shirts and blue jeans.

In 2021, Robichon welcomed new teammate Laurens Vanthoor at Pfaff Motorsports. The pair struggled in the first half of the ten-race season, managing only one win in the first five starts, although the victory came in the prestigious 12 Hours of Sebring.

The Pfaff team began a comeback in the second half with a GTD win in the IMSA Sports Car Weekend and followed it with another in the Hyundai Monterey Sports Car Championship. After a second in Long Beach, the pair were victorious again at the Michelin GT Challenge at VIR, setting the stage for a title showdown at the season finale.

A second in the Petit Le Mans at Road Atlanta was enough to deliver the GTD team championship to Pfaff Motorsports and the drivers’ title to Robichon and Vanthoor. The podium in the season finale ended an impressive string of three victories and two second-place finishes in the second half. In all, the pair took four wins and six podiums in ten starts to win the IMSA SportsCar Championship GTD class title.

With Pfaff Motorsport moving the GTD Pro in 2022, Robichon joined Wright Motorsports in its Porsche 911 GT3 R GTD class entry.

In 2022, Robichon Raced the four rounds of the Michelin Endurance Cup: 24 Hours of Daytona, 12 Hours of Sebring (Sebring), 6 hours at the Glen (Watkins Glen International), and Petit Le Mans (Michelin Raceway Road Atlanta). He admitted that moving into a part-time role brought concerns about fitting into the team and being a third wheel to the ouftfit's full-time drivers, Ryan Hardwick and Jan Heylen.

In his first race with his new team, Robichon took a class victory at Daytona with teammates Ryan Hardwick, Jan Heylen, and Richard Lietz.

=== European Le Mans Series ===
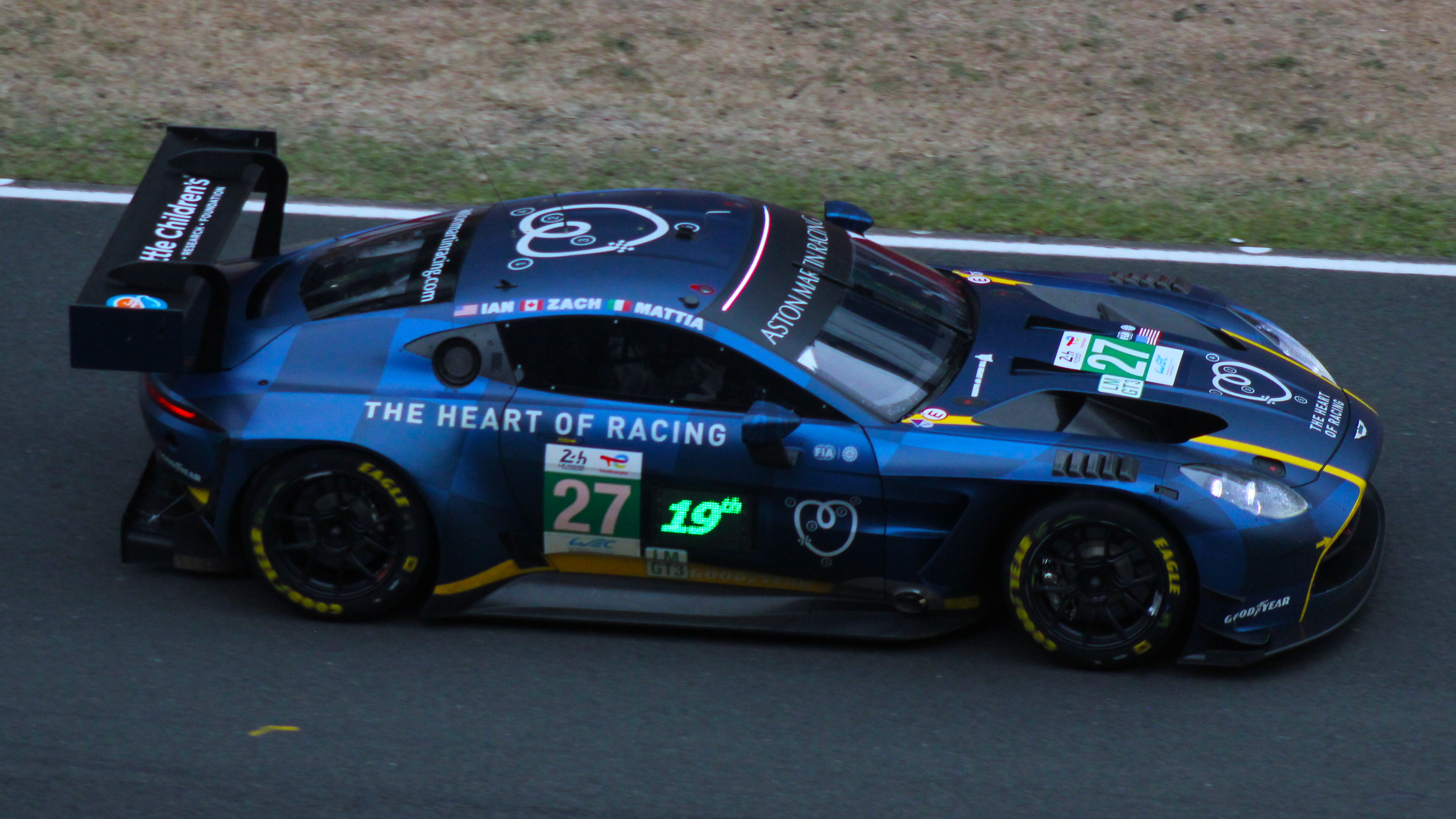
Robichon's No. 27 car at the 2025 24 Hours of Le Mans

On the heels of his victory in the 24 Hours of Daytona, Robichon joined with Proton Competition in the European Le Mans Series, racing Porsche 911 RSR-19 in the GTE class alongside the actor Michael Fassbender and Porsche factory driver Richard Lietz.

In 2023, Robichon won the ELMS championship in the GTE class with Proton Competition.

In his first start in the 24 Hours of Le Mans in 2022, Robichon finished a disappointing 16th in class and 51st overall.

== Racing results ==
=== Career summary ===
Season	Series	Team	Races	Wins	Poles	F/Laps	Podiums	Points	Position
2014	F2000 Championship Series	BGR Team Grote	2	0	0	0	0	38	35th
2019	IMSA SportsCar Championship - GTD	Pfaff Motorsports	10	2	1	0	3	262	**3rd**
2019	IMSA SportsCar Championship - GTD	Park Place Motorsports	1	0	1	0	1	262	**3rd**
2020	IMSA SportsCar Championship - GTD	Pfaff Motorsports	2	0	0	0	0	44	35th
2021	IMSA SportsCar Championship - GTD	Pfaff Motorsports	10	4	0	0	6	3284	**1st**
2022	IMSA SportsCar Championship - GTD	Wright Motorsports	4	1	0	0	1	1191	19th
2022	European Le Mans Series - LMGTE	Proton Competition	6	0	0	0	1	35	14th
2022	24 Hours of Le Mans - LMGTE Am	Proton Competition	1	0	0	0	0	N/A	16th
2023	IMSA SportsCar Championship - GTD	Wright Motorsports	5	0	0	0	1	1052	24th
2023	FIA World Endurance Championship - LMGTE Am	Proton Competition	2	0	0	0	0	14	22nd
2023	European Le Mans Series - LMGTE	Proton Competition	6	2	2	1	5	105	**1st**
2023	24 Hours of Le Mans - LMGTE Am	Proton Competition	1	0	0	0	0	N/A	Ret
2024	IMSA SportsCar Championship - GTD	Heart of Racing Team	5	0	0	0	0	1016	36th
2024	IMSA SportsCar Championship - GTD Pro	Heart of Racing Team	1	0	0	0	0	303	33rd
2024	FIA World Endurance Championship - LMGT3	Proton Competition	8	0	0	0	0	18	22nd
2025	IMSA SportsCar Championship - GTD	Heart of Racing Team	5	1	2	1	3	1574	16th
2025	FIA World Endurance Championship - LMGT3	Heart of Racing Team	8	0	1	0	1	86	4th
2025	GT World Challenge America - Pro-Am	Heart of Racing Team	1	0	0	0	0	0	NC
2025	Intercontinental GT Challenge	Heart of Racing by SPS	2	0	0	0	0	8	27th
2025	Intercontinental GT Challenge	Kessel Racing	1	0	0	0	0	8	27th
2025	GT World Challenge Europe Endurance Cup	Kessel Racing	1	0	0	0	0	0	NC
2026	IMSA SportsCar Championship - GTD	Heart of Racing Team	5	0	2	0	2	1207	24th
2026	FIA World Endurance Championship - LMGT3	Heart of Racing Team	8	1	1	0	3	64	10th
2026-27	Asian Le Mans Series - GT3	Heart of Racing Team							

=== Complete IMSA SportsCar Championship results ===
(key) (Races in bold indicate pole position) (Races in italics indicate fastest lap)

Year	Entrant	Class	Car	Engine	1	2	3	4	5	6	7	8	9	10	11	12	Rank	Points	Ref
2019	Pfaff Motorsports	GTD	Porsche 911 GT3 R	Porsche 4.0 L Flat-6	DAY; 16	SEB; 10	MOH; 12		WGL; 6	MOS; 5	LIM; 1	ELK; 1	**VIR**; 4	LGA; 4	PET; 3		3rd	262	
2019	Park Place Motorsports	GTD	Porsche 911 GT3 R	Porsche 4.0 L Flat-6				**BEL**; 2									3rd	262	
2020	Pfaff Motorsports	GTD	Porsche 911 GT3 R	Porsche 4.0 L Flat-6	DAY; 13	DAY	SEB	ELK	VIR	ATL	MDO	CLT	PET; 5	LGA	SEB		35th	44	
2021	Pfaff Motorsports	GTD	Porsche 911 GT3 R	Porsche 4.0 L Flat-6	DAY; 12	SEB; 1	MDO; 6	DET	WGL; 7	WGL	LIM; 4	ELK; 1	LGA; 1	LBH; 2	VIR; 1	PET; 2	1st	3284	
2022	Wright Motorsports	GTD	Porsche 911 GT3 R	Porsche 4.0 L Flat-6	DAY; 1	SEB; 10	LBH	LGA	MDO	DET	WGL; 6	MOS	LIM	ELK	VIR	PET; 4	19th	1191	
2023	Wright Motorsports	GTD	Porsche 911 GT3 R (992)	Porsche 4.2 L Flat-6	DAY; 9	SEB; 6	LBH	MON	WGL; 3	MOS	LIM	ELK	VIR	IMS	PET; 11		24th	1052	
2024	Heart of Racing Team	GTD	Aston Martin Vantage AMR GT3 Evo	Aston Martin AMR16A 4.0 L Turbo V8	DAY; 22	SEB; 4	LBH	LGA		WGL; 16	MOS	ELK; 9	VIR; 14	IMS			36th	1016	
2024	Heart of Racing Team	GTD Pro	Aston Martin Vantage AMR GT3 Evo	Aston Martin AMR16A 4.0 L Turbo V8					DET						PET; 4		33rd	303	
2025	Heart of Racing Team	GTD	Aston Martin Vantage AMR GT3 Evo	Aston Martin AMR16A 4.0 L Turbo V8	DAY; 3	SEB; 3	LGA	DET	**WGL**; 1	MOS	ELK	VIR	**IMS**; 11	PET; 4			16th	1574	
2026	Heart of Racing Team	GTD	Aston Martin Vantage AMR GT3 Evo	Aston Martin AMR16A 4.0 L Turbo V8	**DAY**; 3	**SEB**; 2	LBH	LGA	WGL; 5	MOS	ELK; 15	VIR	IMS	PET; 17			24th	1307	

^{*} Season still in progress.

=== Complete European Le Mans Series results ===
(key) (Races in bold indicate pole position) (Races in italics indicate fastest lap)

Year	Entrant	Class	Chassis	Engine	1	2	3	4	5	6	Rank	Points
2022	Proton Competition	LMGTE	Porsche 911 RSR-19	Porsche 4.2 L Flat-6	LEC; 3	IMO; 7	MNZ; Ret	CAT; 8	SPA; 7	ALG; 8	14th	35
2023	Proton Competition	LMGTE	Porsche 911 RSR-19	Porsche 4.2 L Flat-6	CAT; 1	LEC; 9	ARA; 2	**SPA**; 3	PRT; 2	ALG; 1	1st	105

=== 24 Hours of Le Mans results ===
Year	Team	Co-drivers	Car	Class	Laps	Pos.	Class pos.
2022	(Germany) Proton Competition	(Australia) Matt Campbell (Republic of Ireland) Michael Fassbender	Porsche 911 RSR-19	GTE; Am	329	51st	16th
2023	(Germany) Proton Competition	(United States) Ryan Hardwick (Belgium) Jan Heylen	Porsche 911 RSR-19	GTE; Am	28	DNF	DNF
2024	(Germany) Proton Competition	(United Kingdom) Ben Barker (United States) Ryan Hardwick	Ford Mustang GT3	LMGT3	227	46th	17th
2025	(United States) Heart of Racing Team	(Italy) Mattia Drudi (United Kingdom) Ian James	Aston Martin Vantage AMR GT3 Evo	LMGT3	341	36th	4th
2026	(United States) Heart of Racing Team	(Italy) Mattia Drudi (United Kingdom) Ian James	Aston Martin Vantage AMR GT3 Evo	LMGT3	291	DNF	DNF

=== Complete FIA World Endurance Championship results ===
(key) (Races in bold indicate pole position) (Races in italics indicate fastest lap)

Year	Entrant	Class	Car	Engine	1	2	3	4	5	6	7	8	Rank	Points
2023	Proton Competition	LMGTE Am	Porsche 911 RSR-19	Porsche 4.2 L Flat-6	SEB; WD	ALG; 9	SPA; 4	LMS	MNZ	FUJ	BHR		22nd	14
2024	Proton Competition	LMGT3	Ford Mustang GT3	Ford Coyote 5.4 L V8	QAT; 11	IMO; 9	SPA; 9	LMS; 14	SÃO; 7	COA; 6	FUJ; 15	BHR; Ret	22nd	18
2025	Heart of Racing Team	LMGT3	Aston Martin Vantage GT3 Evo	Aston Martin M177 4.0 L Turbo V8	QAT; 6	ITA; Ret	SPA; 5	**LMS**; 4	SÃO; 14	COA; 5	FUJ; 7	BHR; 3	4th	86
2026	Heart of Racing Team	LMGT3	Aston Martin Vantage AMR GT3 Evo	Aston Martin M177 4.0 L Turbo V8	IMO; Ret	SPA; 2	**LMS**; Ret	SÃO; 13	COA; 1	FUJ; 2	CAT; 15	MNZ; 9	10th	64

^{*} Season still in progress.

=== Complete Asian Le Mans Series results ===
(key) (Races in bold indicate pole position) (Races in italics indicate fastest lap)

Year	Team	Class	Car	Engine	1	2	3	4	5	6	Pos.	Points
2026–27	Heart of Racing Team	GT	Aston Martin Vantage AMR GT3 Evo	Aston Martin 4.0 L Turbo V8	LEC; 1; 13	LEC; 2; 3	JER; 1	JER; 2	ALG; 1	ALG; 2	6th*	15*

== Personal life ==
Robichon has degrees in business and finance.

Outside of racing, he owns an event management company that runs all the driving related activities for Porsche Canada. The company has a 30 staff that offers driving experiences for Porsche owners, track days, and winter safety courses.
