= 2021 Northeast Grand Prix =

Seventh round of the 2021 IMSA SportsCar Championship Season

Track map of Lime Rock Park

The 2021 Northeast Grand Prix was a sports car race sanctioned by the International Motor Sports Association (IMSA). The race was held at Lime Rock Park in Lakeville, Connecticut, on July 17, 2021. This race was the seventh round of the 2021 IMSA SportsCar Championship, and the fourth round of the 2021 WeatherTech Sprint Cup.

Initially scheduled to run for two hours and 40 minutes, severe weather in the area caused just under 90 minutes of the event to be completed. Antonio García and Jordan Taylor scored overall victory for Corvette Racing; their fourth class victory of the season.

== Background ==
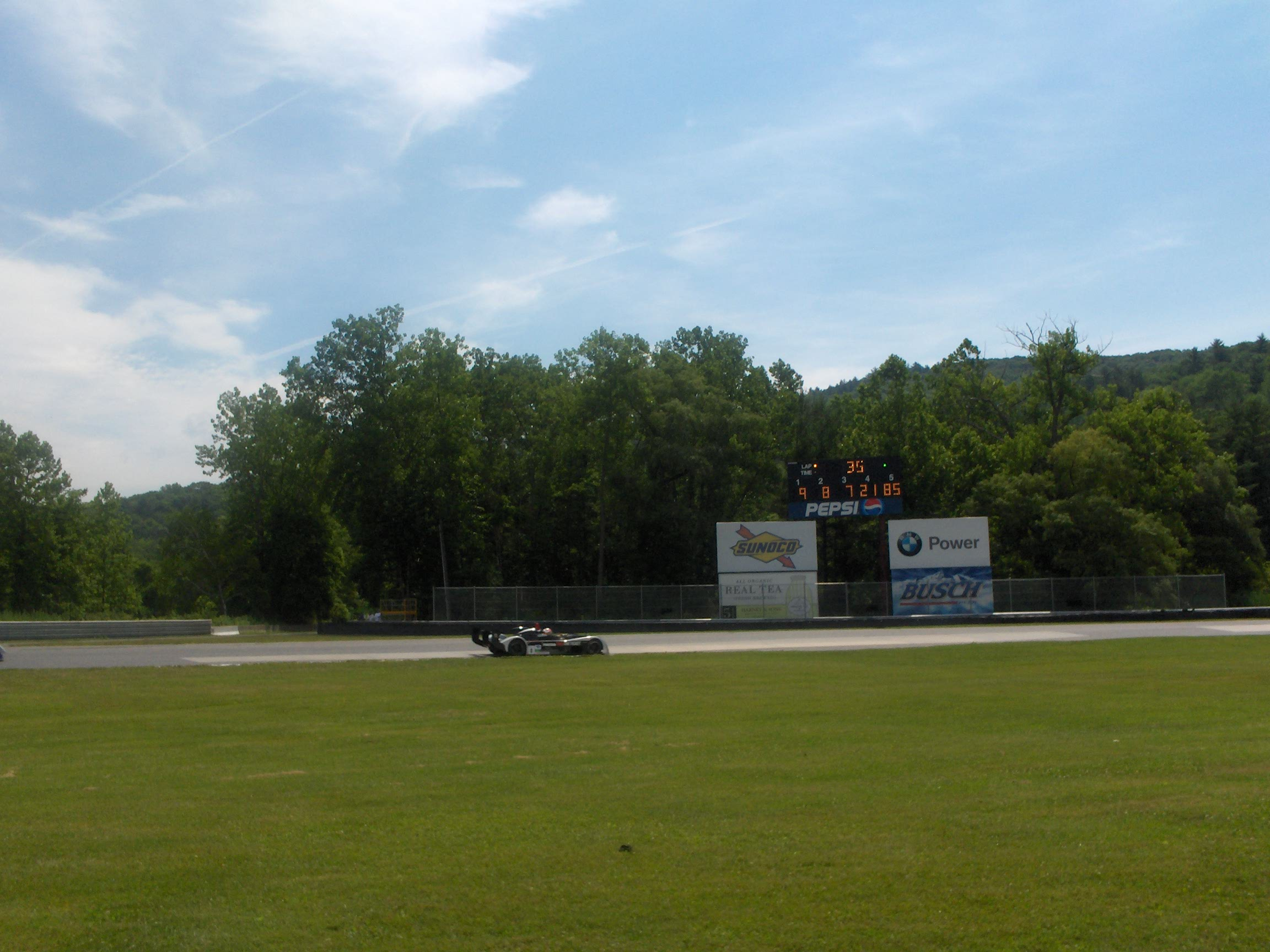
Lime Rock Park, where the race was held.

International Motor Sports Association's (IMSA) president John Doonan confirmed the race was part of the schedule for the 2021 IMSA SportsCar Championship (IMSA SCC) in September 2020. It was the sixth year it was part of the IMSA SCC. The 2021 Northeast Grand Prix was the seventh of twelve sports car races of 2021 by IMSA, and it was the fourth round held as part of the WeatherTech Sprint Cup. The race was held at the seven-turn 1.530 mi (2.462 km) Lime Rock Park in Lakeville, Connecticut, on July 17, 2021.

The race marked IMSA's return to Lime Rock Park following the 2020 edition's cancellation due to the COVID-19 pandemic. As in previous years, the event was also the first GT-only round of the IMSA SportsCar Championship season, in which only the GTLM and GTD classes were scheduled to compete.

On July 8, 2021, IMSA released the latest technical bulletin outlining Balance of Performance for the event. In GTLM, after a 1-2 finish at the WeatherTech 240, the Corvette received a 10 kilogram weight increase. The Porsche, meanwhile, received a 20 kilogram weight break. No changes were made in GTD.

Before the race, Antonio García and Jordan Taylor led the GTLM Drivers' Championship with 1082 points, 81 points ahead of Tommy Milner and Nick Tandy followed by Cooper MacNeil in third. With 1296 points, the GTD Drivers' Championship was led by Bill Auberlen and Robby Foley, ahead of Roman De Angelis and Ross Gunn. Chevrolet and BMW were leading their respective Manufacturers' Championships, while Corvette Racing and Turner Motorsport each led their own Teams' Championships.

=== Entries ===
A total of 16 cars took part in the event, split across two classes. 3 cars were entered in GTLM, and 13 in GTD. 17 cars were featured on the pre-event entry list, and the final tally of 16 was reached following Alegra Motorsports' withdrawal due to sponsorship issues.

GTLM saw an identical entry list from the previous round at Watkins Glen, comprising the pair of Corvette Racing entries and the lone Porsche from WeatherTech Racing. In GTD, Gilbert Korthoff Motorsports didn't return after completing their planned single outing at Watkins Glen, while Pfaff Motorsports, Wright Motorsports, and Magnus Racing returned after skipping the most recent round, which only paid points towards the WeatherTech Sprint Cup.

== Practice ==
There were two practice sessions preceding the start of the race on Saturday, both on Friday. The first session lasted one hour on Friday morning while the second session lasted 75 minutes on Friday afternoon.

=== Practice 1 ===
The first practice session took place at 11:45 am ET and ended with Antonio García topping the charts for Corvette Racing, with a lap time of 50.456. Nick Tandy's No. 4 Corvette was second fastest followed by Mathieu Jaminet in the No. 79 Porsche. The GTD class was topped by the No. 19 GRT Grasser Racing Team Lamborghini Huracán GT3 Evo of Franck Perera with a time of 52.499, ahead of Patrick Long in the No. 16 Porsche.

Pos.	Class	No.	Team	Driver	Time	Gap
1	GTLM	3	Corvette Racing	Antonio García	50.456	_
2	GTLM	4	Corvette Racing	Nick Tandy	50.493	+0.037
3	GTLM	79	WeatherTech Racing	Mathieu Jaminet	50.796	+0.340

=== Practice 2 ===
The second and final practice session took place at 1:55 pm ET on Friday and ended with Tommy Milner topping the charts for Corvette Racing, with a lap time of 50.961, 0.329 seconds faster than Jordan Taylor's No. 3 Corvette. The GTD class was topped by the No. 9 Pfaff Motorsports Porsche 911 GT3 R of Zacharie Robichon with a time of 52.380. Aaron Telitz's No. 14 Lexus was second fastest followed by Trent Hindman in the Wright Motorsports entry. The session was red flagged for 15 minutes to due severe weather.

Pos.	Class	No.	Team	Driver	Time	Gap
1	GTLM	4	Corvette Racing	Tommy Milner	50.961	_
2	GTLM	3	Corvette Racing	Jordan Taylor	51.290	+0.329
3	GTD	9	Pfaff Motorsports	Zacharie Robichon	52.380	+1.419

== Qualifying ==
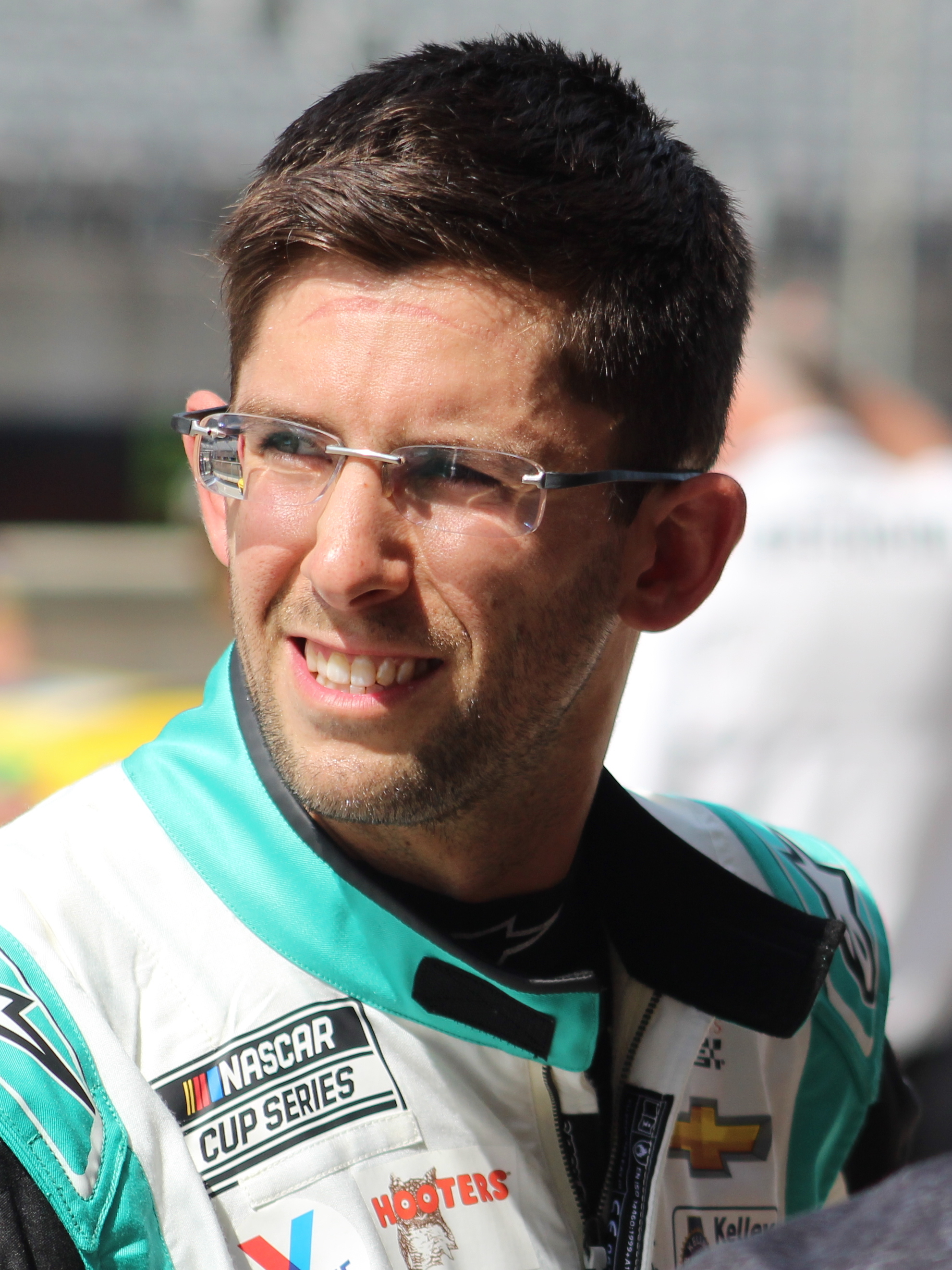
Jordan Taylor (pictured in 2023) secured the overall pole position for Corvette Racing.

Qualifying was broken into two sessions. The first was for cars in the GTD class. Roman De Angelis qualified on pole for the class driving the No. 23 car for Heart of Racing Team, beating Aaron Telitz in the No. 14 Vasser Sullivan Racing entry by 0.045 seconds. Richard Heistand was third in the No. 39 Audi followed by Frankie Montecalvo in the No. 12 Lexus.

The final session of qualifying was for the GTLM and GTD classes. Jordan Taylor qualified on pole in GTLM driving the No. 3 car for Corvette Racing, beating teammate Tommy Milner in the sister No. 4 Corvette Racing entry by less than 0.150 seconds. Jack Hawksworth set the fastest time in the GTD points paying session and earned 35 championship points. The session saw one incident when Cooper MacNeil, driving the No. 79 WeatherTech Racing Porsche, spun at turn 3 and got stuck on the grass. For causing a red flag, MacNeil had his best two laps from the session deleted.

=== Qualifying results ===
Pole positions in each class are indicated in bold and by ‡.

Pos.	Class	No.	Team	Driver	Time	Gap	Grid
1	**GTLM**	**3**	**(United States) Corvette Racing**	**(United States) Jordan Taylor**	**49.958**	**_**	1‡
2	GTLM	4	(United States) Corvette Racing	(United States) Tommy Milner	50.100	+0.142	3^{1}
3	GTLM	79	(United States) WeatherTech Racing	(United States) Cooper MacNeil	50.833	+0.875	2
4	**GTD**	**23**	**(United States) Heart Of Racing Team**	**(Canada) Roman De Angelis**	**51.729**	**+1.771**	4‡
5	GTD	14	(United States) Vasser Sullivan Racing	(United States) Aaron Telitz	51.774	+1.816	5
6	GTD	39	(United States) CarBahn Motorsports with Peregrine Racing	(United States) Richard Heistand	51.784	+1.826	6
7	GTD	12	(United States) Vasser Sullivan Racing	(United States) Frankie Montecalvo	51.937	+1.979	7
8	GTD	1	(United States) Paul Miller Racing	(United States) Madison Snow	51.989	+2.031	8
9	GTD	9	(Canada) Pfaff Motorsports	(Canada) Zacharie Robichon	52.023	+2.065	9
10	GTD	96	(United States) Turner Motorsport	(United States) Robby Foley	52.053	+2.095	10
11	GTD	16	(United States) Wright Motorsports	(United States) John Potter	52.142	+2.184	11
12	GTD	66	(United States) Gradient Racing	(United Kingdom) Till Bechtolsheimer	52.271	+2.313	12
13	GTD	76	(United States) Compass Racing	(Canada) Jeff Kingsley	52.278	+2.320	13
14	GTD	19	(Austria) GRT Grasser Racing Team	(Canada) Misha Goikhberg	52.400	+2.442	14
15	GTD	88	(United States) Team Hardpoint EBM	(United States) Rob Ferriol	53.333	+3.375	15
16	GTD	44	(United States) Magnus Racing with Archangel Motorsports	(United States) John Potter	53.396	+3.438	16
Sources:

- ^{1} The No. 4 Corvette Racing entry was moved to the back of the GTLM field as per Article 40.5 of the Sporting regulations (Engine change).

== Race ==
=== Post-race ===
With a total of 1852 points, García and Taylor's victory allowed them to increase their advantage over Milner and Tandy in the GTLM Drivers' Championship. Jaminet advanced from eighth to fifth. As a result of winning the race, De Angelis and Gunn took the lead of the GTD Drivers' Championship. Chevrolet continued to took the GTLM Manufactures' Championship while Aston Martin took the lead of the GTD Manufactures' Championship. Corvette Racing kept their advantage in GTLM Teams' Championship while Heart of Racing Team took the lead of the GTD Teams' Championship with five rounds remaining in the season.

=== Race results ===
Class winners are denoted in bold and ‡.

Pos	Class	No.	Team	Drivers	Chassis	Laps	Time/Retired
Pos	Class	No.	Team	Drivers	Engine	Laps	Time/Retired
1	**GTLM**	**3**	**(United States) Corvette Racing**	**(Spain) Antonio García (United States) Jordan Taylor**	**Chevrolet Corvette C8.R**	**100**	**1:28:29.019‡**
1	**GTLM**	**3**	**(United States) Corvette Racing**	**(Spain) Antonio García (United States) Jordan Taylor**	**Chevrolet 5.5L V8**	**100**	**1:28:29.019‡**
2	GTLM	4	(United States) Corvette Racing	(United States) Tommy Milner (United Kingdom) Nick Tandy	Chevrolet Corvette C8.R	100	+18.134
2	GTLM	4	(United States) Corvette Racing	(United States) Tommy Milner (United Kingdom) Nick Tandy	Chevrolet 5.5L V8	100	+18.134
3	GTLM	79	(United States) WeatherTech Racing	(United States) Cooper MacNeil (France) Mathieu Jaminet	Porsche 911 RSR-19	100	+27.793
3	GTLM	79	(United States) WeatherTech Racing	(United States) Cooper MacNeil (France) Mathieu Jaminet	Porsche 4.2L Flat-6	100	+27.793
4	**GTD**	**23**	**(United States) Heart of Racing Team**	**(Canada) Roman De Angelis (United Kingdom) Ross Gunn**	**Aston Martin Vantage GT3**	**98**	**+2 Laps‡**
4	**GTD**	**23**	**(United States) Heart of Racing Team**	**(Canada) Roman De Angelis (United Kingdom) Ross Gunn**	**Mercedes-Benz M177 4.0 L Turbo V8**	**98**	**+2 Laps‡**
5	GTD	1	(United States) Paul Miller Racing	(United States) Bryan Sellers (United States) Madison Snow	Lamborghini Huracán GT3 Evo	98	+2 Laps
5	GTD	1	(United States) Paul Miller Racing	(United States) Bryan Sellers (United States) Madison Snow	Lamborghini 5.2L V10	98	+2 Laps
6	GTD	14	(United States) Vasser Sullivan Racing	(United States) Aaron Telitz (United Kingdom) Jack Hawksworth	Lexus RC F GT3	98	+2 Laps
6	GTD	14	(United States) Vasser Sullivan Racing	(United States) Aaron Telitz (United Kingdom) Jack Hawksworth	Lexus 5.0L V8	98	+2 Laps
7	GTD	9	(Canada) Pfaff Motorsports	(Canada) Zacharie Robichon (Belgium) Laurens Vanthoor	Porsche 911 GT3 R	98	+2 Laps
7	GTD	9	(Canada) Pfaff Motorsports	(Canada) Zacharie Robichon (Belgium) Laurens Vanthoor	Porsche 4.0L Flat-6	98	+2 Laps
8	GTD	96	(United States) Turner Motorsport	(United States) Bill Auberlen (United States) Robby Foley	BMW M6 GT3	98	+2 Laps
8	GTD	96	(United States) Turner Motorsport	(United States) Bill Auberlen (United States) Robby Foley	BMW 4.4L Turbo V8	98	+2 Laps
9	GTD	39	(United States) CarBahn Motorsports with Peregrine Racing	(United States) Richard Heistand (United States) Jeff Westphal	Audi R8 LMS Evo	97	+3 Laps
9	GTD	39	(United States) CarBahn Motorsports with Peregrine Racing	(United States) Richard Heistand (United States) Jeff Westphal	Audi 5.2L V10	97	+3 Laps
10	GTD	19	(Austria) GRT Grasser Racing Team	(Canada) Misha Goikhberg (France) Franck Perera	Lamborghini Huracán GT3 Evo	97	+3 Laps
10	GTD	19	(Austria) GRT Grasser Racing Team	(Canada) Misha Goikhberg (France) Franck Perera	Lamborghini 5.2L V10	97	+3 Laps
11	GTD	16	(United States) Wright Motorsports	(United States) Trent Hindman (United States) Patrick Long	Porsche 911 GT3 R	97	+3 Laps
11	GTD	16	(United States) Wright Motorsports	(United States) Trent Hindman (United States) Patrick Long	Porsche 4.0L Flat-6	97	+3 Laps
12	GTD	76	(United States) Compass Racing	(Canada) Jeff Kingsley (Germany) Mario Farnbacher	Acura NSX GT3 Evo	97	+3 Laps
12	GTD	76	(United States) Compass Racing	(Canada) Jeff Kingsley (Germany) Mario Farnbacher	Acura 3.5L Turbo V6	97	+3 Laps
13	GTD	12	(United States) Vasser Sullivan Racing	(United States) Frankie Montecalvo (United States) Zach Veach	Lexus RC F GT3	97	+3 Laps
13	GTD	12	(United States) Vasser Sullivan Racing	(United States) Frankie Montecalvo (United States) Zach Veach	Lexus 5.0L V8	97	+3 Laps
14	GTD	66	(United States) Gradient Racing	(United Kingdom) Till Bechtolsheimer (United States) Marc Miller	Acura NSX GT3 Evo	97	+3 Laps
14	GTD	66	(United States) Gradient Racing	(United Kingdom) Till Bechtolsheimer (United States) Marc Miller	Acura 3.5L Turbo V6	97	+3 Laps
15	GTD	88	(United States) Team Hardpoint EBM	(United States) Rob Ferriol (United Kingdom) Katherine Legge	Porsche 911 GT3 R	96	+4 Laps
15	GTD	88	(United States) Team Hardpoint EBM	(United States) Rob Ferriol (United Kingdom) Katherine Legge	Porsche 4.0L Flat-6	96	+4 Laps
16	GTD	44	(United States) Magnus Racing with Archangel Motorsports	(United States) John Potter (United States) Andy Lally	Acura NSX GT3 Evo	95	+5 Laps
16	GTD	44	(United States) Magnus Racing with Archangel Motorsports	(United States) John Potter (United States) Andy Lally	Acura 3.5L Turbo V6	95	+5 Laps

== Standings after the race ==
DPi Drivers' Championship standings
Pos.	+/–	Driver	Points
1		(Portugal) Filipe Albuquerque (United States) Ricky Taylor	2068
2		(United Kingdom) Oliver Jarvis (United Kingdom) Harry Tincknell	1987
3		(Brazil) Pipo Derani (Brazil) Felipe Nasr	1954
4		(Denmark) Kevin Magnussen (Netherlands) Renger van der Zande	1849
5		(United States) Dane Cameron (France) Olivier Pla	1793

LMP2 Drivers' Championship standings
Pos.	+/–	Driver	Points
1		(Denmark) Mikkel Jensen (United States) Ben Keating	1087
2		(United States) Tristan Nunez (United States) Steven Thomas	1052
3		(France) Gabriel Aubry (Canada) John Farano	964
4		(United States) Scott Huffaker	702
5		(United States) Thomas Merrill	700

LMP3 Drivers' Championship standings
Pos.	+/–	Driver	Points
1		(United States) Gar Robinson	1468
2		(United States) Jon Bennett (United States) Colin Braun	1372
3		(United States) Jim Cox (United States) Dylan Murry	1290
4		(United States) Oliver Askew	1214
5		(Sweden) Rasmus Lindh (United States) Dan Goldburg	1183

GTLM Drivers' Championship standings
Pos.	+/–	Driver	Points
1		(Spain) Antonio García (United States) Jordan Taylor	1852
2		(United States) Tommy Milner (United Kingdom) Nick Tandy	1661
3		(United States) Cooper MacNeil	1604
4		(United States) John Edwards (Brazil) Augusto Farfus (Finland) Jesse Krohn	1001
5	3	(France) Mathieu Jaminet	994

GTD Drivers' Championship standings
Pos.	+/–	Driver	Points
1	1	(Canada) Roman De Angelis (United Kingdom) Ross Gunn	1606
2	1	(United States) Bill Auberlen (United States) Robby Foley	1578
3		(United States) Madison Snow (United States) Bryan Sellers	1536
4		(Canada) Zacharie Robichon (Belgium) Laurens Vanthoor	1445
5		(United States) Patrick Long	1389

- Note: Only the top five positions are included for all sets of standings.

DPi Teams' Championship standings
Pos.	+/–	Team	Points
1		(United States) #10 WTR-Konica Minolta Acura	2068
2		(Canada) #55 Mazda Motorsports	1987
3		(United States) #31 Whelen Engineering Racing	1954
4		(United States) #01 Cadillac Chip Ganassi Racing	1849
5		(United States) #60 Meyer Shank Racing w/ Curb-Agajanian	1793

LMP2 Teams' Championship standings
Pos.	+/–	Team	Points
1		(United States) #52 PR1 Mathiasen Motorsports	1087
2		(United States) #11 WIN Autosport	1052
3		(United States) #8 Tower Motorsport	964
4		(United States) #18 Era Motorsport	640
5		(United States) #22 United Autosports	614

LMP3 Teams' Championship standings
Pos.	+/–	Team	Points
1		(United States) #74 Riley Motorsports	1468
2		(United States) #54 CORE Autosport	1372
3		(United States) #91 Riley Motorsports	1290
4		(United States) #38 Performance Tech Motorsports	1183
5		(United States) #36 Andretti Autosport	902

GTLM Teams' Championship standings
Pos.	+/–	Team	Points
1		(United States) #3 Corvette Racing	1852
2		(United States) #4 Corvette Racing	1661
3		(United States) #79 WeatherTech Racing	1604
4		(United States) #24 BMW Team RLL	1001
5		(United States) #25 BMW Team RLL	966

GTD Teams' Championship standings
Pos.	+/–	Team	Points
1	1	(United States) #23 Heart of Racing Team	1606
2	1	(United States) #96 Turner Motorsport	1578
3		(United States) #1 Paul Miller Racing	1536
4		(Canada) #9 Pfaff Motorsports	1445
5		(United States) #16 Wright Motorsports	1389

- Note: Only the top five positions are included for all sets of standings.

DPi Manufacturers' Championship standings
Pos.	+/–	Manufacturer	Points
1		(United States) Cadillac	2189
2		(Japan) Acura	2154
3		(Japan) Mazda	2059

GTLM Manufacturers' Championship standings
Pos.	+/–	Manufacturer	Points
1		(United States) Chevrolet	1875
2		(Germany) Porsche	1726
3		(Germany) BMW	1052
4		(Italy) Ferrari	330

GTD Manufacturers' Championship standings
Pos.	+/–	Manufacturer	Points
1	2	(United Kingdom) Aston Martin	1656
2		(Italy) Lamborghini	1633
3	2	(Germany) BMW	1627
4		(Germany) Porsche	1579
5		(Japan) Lexus	1545

- Note: Only the top five positions are included for all sets of standings.

IMSA SportsCar Championship
Previous race: 2021 WeatherTech 240	2021 season	Next race: 2021 Road Race Showcase at Road America
