= Corvette Racing =

American auto racing team

(United States) Corvette Racing
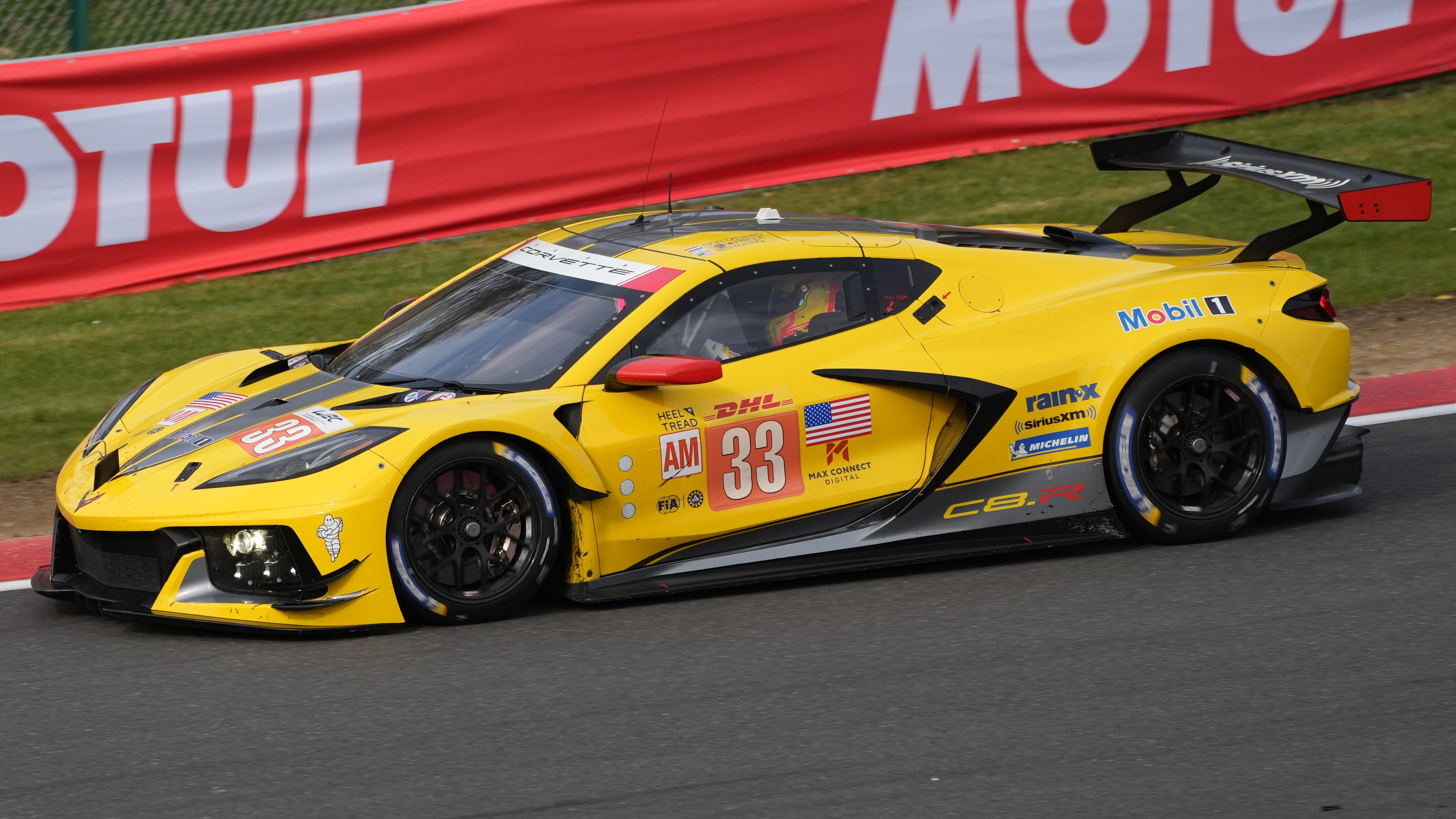
- Founded: 1999
- Team principal(s): Doug Fehan
- Current series: FIA World Endurance Championship; IMSA SportsCar Championship
- Former series: American Le Mans Series; Rolex Sports Car Series
- Noted drivers: Ron Fellows, Johnny O'Connell, Scott Pruett, Oliver Gavin, Olivier Beretta, Jan Magnussen, Antonio García, Tommy Milner, Jordan Taylor, Nicky Catsburg, Ben Keating, Nicolás Varrone
- Teams' Championships: American Le Mans Series: 2001, 2002, 2003, 2004, 2005, 2006, 2007, 2008, 2012, 2013; IMSA SportsCar Championship: 2016, 2017, 2018, 2020, 2021, 2025; FIA World Endurance Championship: 2023
- Drivers' Championships: American Le Mans Series: 2002, 2003, 2004, 2005, 2006, 2007, 2008, 2012, 2013; IMSA SportsCar Championship: 2016, 2017, 2018, 2020, 2021, 2025; FIA World Endurance Championship: 2023

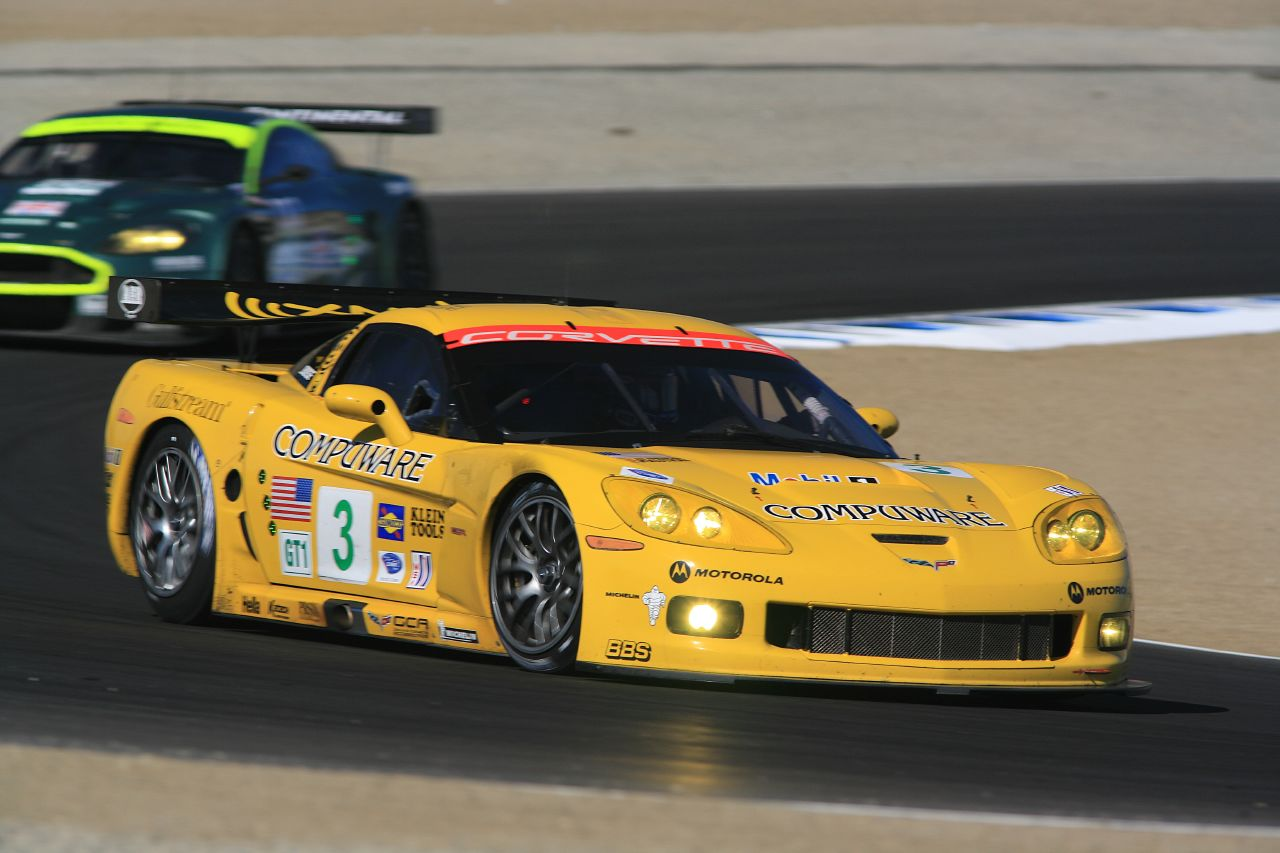
One of Corvette Racing's Chevrolet Corvette C6.R cars being raced at Laguna Seca in the American Le Mans Series in 2006.

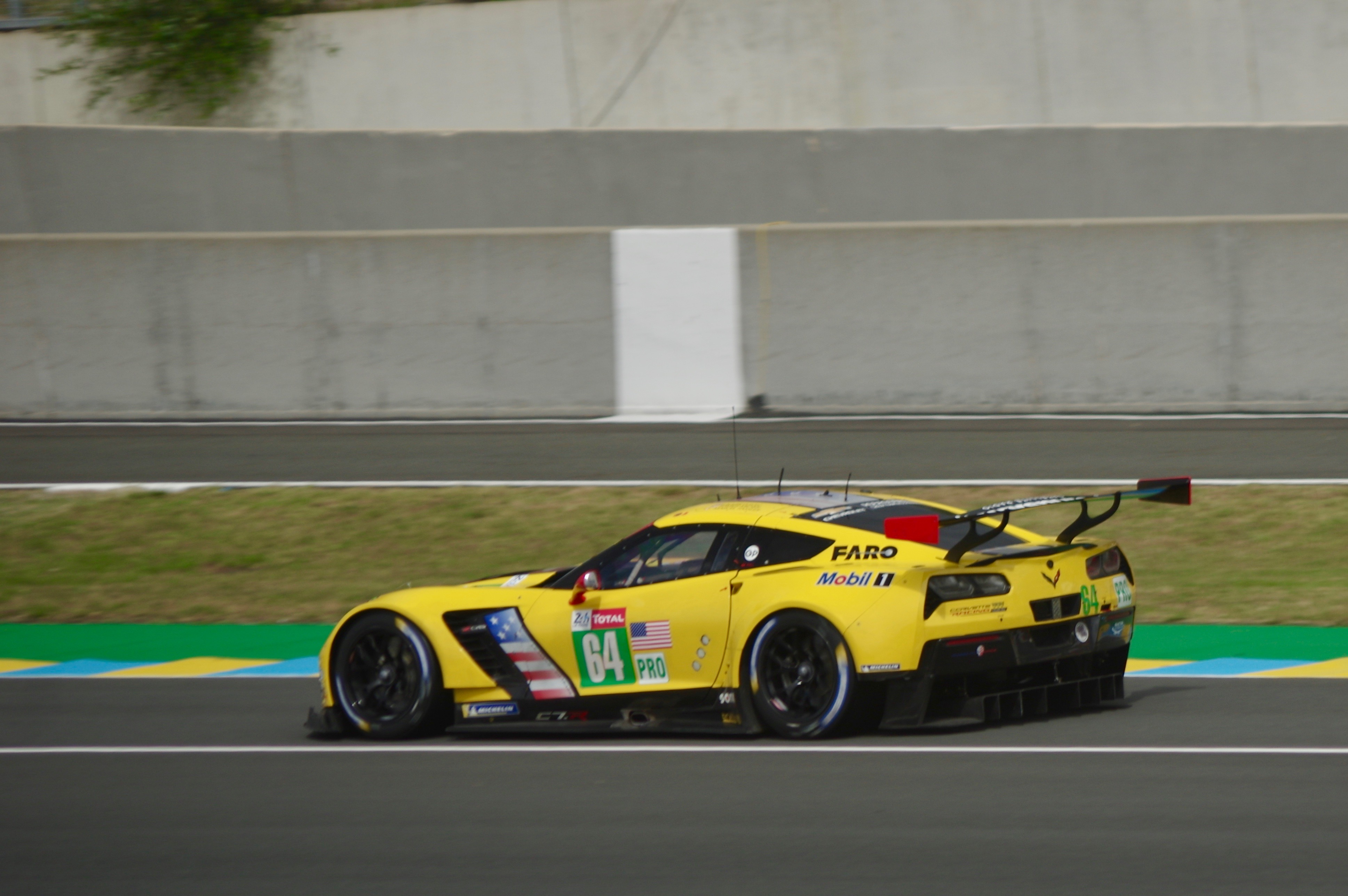
Chevrolet Corvette C7.R driven by Marcel Fässler, Oliver Gavin, and Tommy Milner in 2017

Corvette Racing is an American auto racing team established in 1999 by General Motors and Pratt Miller for the purposes of competing in sports car racing internationally. Corvette Racing was originally the official racing program for General Motors and their Chevrolet Corvette production car until the end of the LM GTE class in 2023, having utilized four generations of the Corvette to develop racing cars, although racing programs involving the Corvette have been endorsed by General Motors to varying degrees since 1956. The team is known for its yellow livery and several class wins at the 24 Hours of Le Mans.

Corvette Racing closed out its direct factory operation at the end of 2023, with General Motors focusing on customer teams with the new Chevrolet Corvette Z06 GT3.R. Beginning in 2024, the team rebranded under the name Corvette Racing by Pratt Miller Motorsports for the IMSA SportsCar Championship. Corvette Racing is also supporting TF Sport, which switched from Aston Martin to Corvette for 2024 in the FIA World Endurance Championship. Both the IMSA and WEC entries are run with limited GM factory support.

Corvette Racing has had multiple successes across multiple championships, including one championship in the FIA World Endurance Championship, five championships in the IMSA SportsCar Championship, and ten championships in the American Le Mans Series, as well as nine victories at the 24 Hours of Le Mans, four victories at the 24 Hours of Daytona, 11 victories at the 12 Hours of Sebring, and eight victories at Petit Le Mans.

== Results ==
=== 24 Hours of Le Mans ===
Officially debuting in 2000, Corvette Racing has won the 24 Hours of Le Mans nine times with Pratt Miller Motorsports. From 2024, Corvette Racing supports customer team TF Sport for Le Mans and the FIA World Endurance Championship.

Year	Entrant	No.	Car	Drivers	Class	Laps	Pos.	Class Pos.
2000	(United States) Corvette Racing	63	Chevrolet Corvette C5-R	(United Kingdom) Justin Bell (Canada) Ron Fellows (United States) Chris Kneifel	LMGTS	326	11th	4th
2000	(United States) Corvette Racing	64	Chevrolet Corvette C5-R	(United States) Kelly Collins (France) Franck Fréon (United States) Andy Pilgrim	LMGTS	327	10th	3rd
2001	(United States) Corvette Racing Pratt	63	Chevrolet Corvette C5-R	(Canada) Ron Fellows (United States) Johnny O'Connell (United States) Scott Pruett	LMGTS	278	8th	1st
2001	(United States) Corvette Racing Pratt	64	Chevrolet Corvette C5-R	(United States) Kelly Collins (France) Franck Fréon (United States) Andy Pilgrim	LMGTS	271	14th	2nd
2002	(United States) Corvette Racing	63	Chevrolet Corvette C5-R	(Canada) Ron Fellows (United Kingdom) Oliver Gavin (United States) Johnny O'Connell	LMGTS	335	11th	1st
2002	(United States) Corvette Racing	64	Chevrolet Corvette C5-R	(United States) Kelly Collins (France) Franck Fréon (United States) Andy Pilgrim	LMGTS	331	13th	2nd
2003	(United States) Corvette Racing	50	Chevrolet Corvette C5-R	(United States) Kelly Collins (United Kingdom) Oliver Gavin (United States) Andy Pilgrim	LMGTS	326	11th	2nd
2003	(United States) Corvette Racing	53	Chevrolet Corvette C5-R	(Canada) Ron Fellows (France) Franck Fréon (United States) Johnny O'Connell	LMGTS	326	12th	3rd
2004	(United States) Corvette Racing	63	Chevrolet Corvette C5-R	(Canada) Ron Fellows (United States) Johnny O'Connell (Italy) Max Papis	LMGTS	334	8th	2nd
2004	(United States) Corvette Racing	64	Chevrolet Corvette C5-R	(Monaco) Olivier Beretta (United Kingdom) Oliver Gavin (Denmark) Jan Magnussen	LMGTS	345	6th	1st
2005	(United States) Corvette Racing	63	Chevrolet Corvette C6.R	(Canada) Ron Fellows (United States) Johnny O'Connell (Italy) Max Papis	LMGT1	347	6th	2nd
2005	(United States) Corvette Racing	64	Chevrolet Corvette C6.R	(Monaco) Olivier Beretta (United Kingdom) Oliver Gavin (Denmark) Jan Magnussen	LMGT1	349	5th	1st
2006	(United States) Corvette Racing	63	Chevrolet Corvette C6.R	(Canada) Ron Fellows (United States) Johnny O'Connell (Italy) Max Papis	LMGT1	327	12th	7th
2006	(United States) Corvette Racing	64	Chevrolet Corvette C6.R	(Monaco) Olivier Beretta (United Kingdom) Oliver Gavin (Denmark) Jan Magnussen	LMGT1	355	4th	1st
2007	(United States) Corvette Racing	63	Chevrolet Corvette C6.R	(Canada) Ron Fellows (Denmark) Jan Magnussen (United States) Johnny O'Connell	LMGT1	342	6th	2nd
2007	(United States) Corvette Racing	64	Chevrolet Corvette C6.R	(Monaco) Olivier Beretta (United Kingdom) Oliver Gavin (Italy) Max Papis	LMGT1	22	DNF	DNF
2008	(United States) Corvette Racing	63	Chevrolet Corvette C6.R	(Canada) Ron Fellows (Denmark) Jan Magnussen (United States) Johnny O'Connell	LMGT1	344	14th	2nd
2008	(United States) Corvette Racing	64	Chevrolet Corvette C6.R	(Monaco) Olivier Beretta (United Kingdom) Oliver Gavin (Italy) Max Papis	LMGT1	341	15th	3rd
2009	(United States) Corvette Racing	63	Chevrolet Corvette C6.R	(Spain) Antonio García (Denmark) Jan Magnussen (United States) Johnny O'Connell	LMGT1	342	15th	1st
2009	(United States) Corvette Racing	64	Chevrolet Corvette C6.R	(Monaco) Olivier Beretta (Switzerland) Marcel Fässler (United Kingdom) Oliver Gavin	LMGT1	311	DNF	DNF
2010	(United States) Corvette Racing	63	Chevrolet Corvette C6.R	(Spain) Antonio García (Denmark) Jan Magnussen (United States) Johnny O'Connell	LMGT2	225	DNF	DNF
2010	(United States) Corvette Racing	64	Chevrolet Corvette C6.R	(Monaco) Olivier Beretta (France) Emmanuel Collard (United Kingdom) Oliver Gavin	LMGT2	255	DNF	DNF
2011	(United States) Corvette Racing	73	Chevrolet Corvette C6.R	(Monaco) Olivier Beretta (Spain) Antonio García (United States) Tommy Milner	LMGTE Pro	314	11th	1st
2011	(United States) Corvette Racing	74	Chevrolet Corvette C6.R	(United Kingdom) Oliver Gavin (Denmark) Jan Magnussen (United Kingdom) Richard Westbrook	LMGTE Pro	211	DNF	DNF
2012	(United States) Corvette Racing	73	Chevrolet Corvette C6.R	(Spain) Antonio García (Denmark) Jan Magnussen (United States) Jordan Taylor	LMGTE Pro	326	23rd	5th
2012	(United States) Corvette Racing	74	Chevrolet Corvette C6.R	(United Kingdom) Oliver Gavin (United States) Tommy Milner (United Kingdom) Richard Westbrook	LMGTE Pro	215	NC	NC
2013	(United States) Corvette Racing	73	Chevrolet Corvette C6.R	(Spain) Antonio García (Denmark) Jan Magnussen (United States) Jordan Taylor	LMGTE Pro	312	19th	4th
2013	(United States) Corvette Racing	74	Chevrolet Corvette C6.R	(United Kingdom) Oliver Gavin (United States) Tommy Milner (United Kingdom) Richard Westbrook	LMGTE Pro	309	22nd	7th
2014	(United States) Corvette Racing	73	Chevrolet Corvette C7.R	(Spain) Antonio García (Denmark) Jan Magnussen (United States) Jordan Taylor	LMGTE Pro	338	16th	2nd
2014	(United States) Corvette Racing	74	Chevrolet Corvette C7.R	(United Kingdom) Oliver Gavin (United States) Tommy Milner (United Kingdom) Richard Westbrook	LMGTE Pro	333	20th	4th
2015	(United States) Corvette Racing – GM	63	Chevrolet Corvette C7.R	(Australia) Ryan Briscoe (Spain) Antonio García (Denmark) Jan Magnussen	LMGTE Pro	0	WD	WD
2015	(United States) Corvette Racing – GM	64	Chevrolet Corvette C7.R	(United Kingdom) Oliver Gavin (United States) Tommy Milner (United States) Jordan Taylor	LMGTE Pro	337	17th	1st
2016	(United States) Corvette Racing – GM	63	Chevrolet Corvette C7.R	(Spain) Antonio García (Denmark) Jan Magnussen (United States) Ricky Taylor	LMGTE Pro	336	25th	7th
2016	(United States) Corvette Racing – GM	64	Chevrolet Corvette C7.R	(United Kingdom) Oliver Gavin (United States) Tommy Milner (United States) Jordan Taylor	LMGTE Pro	219	DNF	DNF
2017	(United States) Corvette Racing – GM	63	Chevrolet Corvette C7.R	(Spain) Antonio García (Denmark) Jan Magnussen (United States) Jordan Taylor	LMGTE Pro	340	19th	3rd
2017	(United States) Corvette Racing – GM	64	Chevrolet Corvette C7.R	(Switzerland) Marcel Fässler (United Kingdom) Oliver Gavin (United States) Tommy Milner	LMGTE Pro	335	24th	8th
2018	(United States) Corvette Racing – GM	63	Chevrolet Corvette C7.R	(Spain) Antonio García (Denmark) Jan Magnussen (Germany) Mike Rockenfeller	LMGTE Pro	342	18th	4th
2018	(United States) Corvette Racing – GM	64	Chevrolet Corvette C7.R	(Switzerland) Marcel Fässler (United Kingdom) Oliver Gavin (United States) Tommy Milner	LMGTE Pro	259	DNF	DNF
2019	(United States) Corvette Racing	63	Chevrolet Corvette C7.R	(Spain) Antonio García (Denmark) Jan Magnussen (Germany) Mike Rockenfeller	LMGTE Pro	337	28th	8th
2019	(United States) Corvette Racing	64	Chevrolet Corvette C7.R	(Switzerland) Marcel Fässler (United Kingdom) Oliver Gavin (United States) Tommy Milner	LMGTE Pro	82	DNF	DNF
2021	(United States) Corvette Racing	63	Chevrolet Corvette C8.R	(Netherlands) Nicky Catsburg (Spain) Antonio García (United States) Jordan Taylor	LMGTE Pro	345	21st	2nd
2021	(United States) Corvette Racing	64	Chevrolet Corvette C8.R	(United States) Tommy Milner (United Kingdom) Alexander Sims (United Kingdom) Nick Tandy	LMGTE Pro	313	44th	6th
2022	(United States) Corvette Racing	63	Chevrolet Corvette C8.R	(Netherlands) Nicky Catsburg (Spain) Antonio García (United States) Jordan Taylor	LMGTE Pro	214	DNF	DNF
2022	(United States) Corvette Racing	64	Chevrolet Corvette C8.R	(United States) Tommy Milner (United Kingdom) Alexander Sims (United Kingdom) Nick Tandy	LMGTE Pro	260	DNF	DNF
2023	(United States) Corvette Racing	33	Chevrolet Corvette C8.R	(Netherlands) Nicky Catsburg (United States) Ben Keating (Argentina) Nicolás Varrone	LMGTE Am	313	26th	1st

==== Le Mans wins by Corvette generation ====
Vehicle	Active	Wins
Corvette C5-R	2000–2004	3 (2001, 2002, 2004)
Corvette C6.R	2005–2013	4 (2005, 2006, 2009, 2011)
Corvette C7.R	2014–2019	1 (2015)
Corvette C8.R	2021–2023	1 (2023)
Corvette Z06 GT3.R	2024–present	1 (2026)

== IMSA racing results ==
=== Complete IMSA SportsCar Championship results ===
(key) Races in bold indicates pole position. Races in italics indicates fastest lap.

Year	Entrant	Class	Drivers	No.	Rds.	Rounds												Pts.	Pos.
Year	Entrant	Class	Drivers	No.	Rds.	1	2	3	4	5	6	7	8	9	10	11	12	Pts.	Pos.
2014	(United States) Corvette Racing	GTLM	(Spain) Antonio García (Denmark) Jan Magnussen (Australia) Ryan Briscoe (United States) Jordan Taylor	3	All; 1-4, 7-10, 12-13; 1-2, 13; 11	DAY; 10	SEB; 8	**LBH**; **1**	**LGA**; **1**	WGL; 1	MOS; 1	IMS; 4	ELK; 6	VIR; 7	COA; 9	ATL; 8		317	2nd
2014	(United States) Corvette Racing	GTLM	(United Kingdom) Oliver Gavin (United States) Tommy Milner (United Kingdom) Robin Liddell (Australia) Ryan Briscoe	4	All; All; 1-2; 13	DAY; 5	SEB; 6	LBH; 3	LGA; 5	WGL; 5	MOS; 7	IMS; 5	ELK; 7	VIR; 9	COA; 10	ATL; 4		291	8th
2015	(United States) Corvette Racing	GTLM	(Spain) Antonio García (Denmark) Jan Magnussen (Australia) Ryan Briscoe	3	All; All; 1-2, 12	DAY; 1	SEB; 1	LBH; 3	LGA; 7	**WGL**; **4**	MOS; 3	ELK; 4	VIR; 6	COA; 6	ATL; 6			295	3rd
2015	(United States) Corvette Racing	GTLM	(United Kingdom) Oliver Gavin (United States) Tommy Milner (France) Simon Pagenaud (Australia) Ryan Briscoe	4	All; All; 1-2; 12	**DAY**; **3**	SEB; 9	LBH; 7	LGA; 6	WGL; 7	MOS; 5	ELK; 7	VIR; 8	COA; 8	ATL; 3			261	8th
2016	(United States) Corvette Racing	GTLM	(Spain) Antonio García (Denmark) Jan Magnussen (Germany) Mike Rockenfeller	3	All; All; 1-2, 12	DAY; 2	SEB; 9	LBH; 9	LGA; 4	WGL; 7	MOS; 3	LIM; 2	ELK; 6	**VIR**; **1**	COA; 3	ATL; 4		319	3rd
2016	(United States) Corvette Racing	GTLM	(United Kingdom) Oliver Gavin (United States) Tommy Milner (Switzerland) Marcel Fässler	4	All; All; 1-2, 12	DAY; 1	SEB; 1	LBH; 2	LGA; 7	WGL; 4	MOS; 2	LIM; 1	ELK; 1	VIR; 9	COA; 5	ATL; 3		345	1st
2017	(United States) Corvette Racing	GTLM	(Spain) Antonio García (Denmark) Jan Magnussen (Germany) Mike Rockenfeller	3	All; All; 1-2, 12	DAY; 4	SEB; 1	**LBH**; **5**	COA; 1	WGL; 3	MOS; 4	LIM; 4	ELK; 4	VIR; 1	LGA; 4	ATL; 2		344	1st
2017	(United States) Corvette Racing	GTLM	(United Kingdom) Oliver Gavin (United States) Tommy Milner (Switzerland) Marcel Fässler	4	All; All; 1-2, 12	DAY; 9	SEB; 10	LBH; 1	COA; 7	WGL; 5	MOS; 8	LIM; 8	ELK; 5	VIR; 6	LGA; 9	ATL; 4		276	8th
2018	(United States) Corvette Racing	GTLM	(Spain) Antonio García (Denmark) Jan Magnussen (Germany) Mike Rockenfeller (Switzerland) Marcel Fässler	3	All; All; 1-2; 12	**DAY**; **3**	SEB; 8	LBH; 4	MOH; 3	WGL; 2	MOS; 2	**LIM**; **2**	ELK; 3	VIR; 2	LGA; 3	ATL; 8		322	1st
2018	(United States) Corvette Racing	GTLM	(United Kingdom) Oliver Gavin (United States) Tommy Milner (Switzerland) Marcel Fässler	4	All; All; 1-2, 12	DAY; 4	SEB; 6	LBH; 1	MOH; 8	WGL; 5	MOS; 3	LIM; 4	ELK; 2	VIR; 6	**LGA**; **5**	ATL; 2		310	3rd
2019	(United States) Corvette Racing	GTLM	(Spain) Antonio García (Denmark) Jan Magnussen (Germany) Mike Rockenfeller	3	All; All; 1-2, 12	DAY; 6	SEB; 3	LBH; 2	MOH; 2	**WGL**; **2**	MOS; 7	LIM; 5	**ELK**; **4**	VIR; 3	LGA; 3	ATL; 4		317	3rd
2019	(United States) Corvette Racing	GTLM	(United Kingdom) Oliver Gavin (United States) Tommy Milner (Switzerland) Marcel Fässler	4	All; 1-4, 6, 9-12; 1-2, 7-8, 12	DAY; 8	SEB; 8	LBH; 3	MOH; 8	WGL; 8	MOS; 8	LIM; 6	ELK; 6	VIR; 4	LGA; 4	ATL; 7		275	8th
2020	(United States) Corvette Racing	GTLM	(Spain) Antonio García (United States) Jordan Taylor (Netherlands) Nicky Catsburg	3	All; All; 1, 9, 11	DAY 1; 4	DAY 2; 1	**SEB 1**; **2**	ELK; 1	VIR; 1	ATL 1; 5	**MOH**; **1**	**CLT**; **1**	**ATL 2**; **2**	**LGA**; **2**	**SEB 2**; **5**		351	1st
2020	(United States) Corvette Racing	GTLM	(United Kingdom) Oliver Gavin (United States) Tommy Milner (Switzerland) Marcel Fässler	4	All; All; 1, 9, 11	DAY 1; 7	**DAY 2**; **5**	SEB 1; 1	ELK; 2	VIR; 4	ATL 1; 2	MOH; 2	CLT; 4	ATL 2; 4	LGA; 6	SEB 2; 6		315	3rd
2021	(United States) Corvette Racing	GTLM	(Spain) Antonio García (United States) Jordan Taylor (Netherlands) Nicky Catsburg	3	All; All; 1-2, 12	DAY 1; 2	DAY 2; 1	**SEB**; **4**	BEL; 2	**WGL 1**; **1**	**WGL 2**; **1**	**LIM**; **1**	**ELK**; **2**	**LGA**; **2**	**LBH**; **2**	VIR; 2	ATL; 6	3549	1st
2021	(United States) Corvette Racing	GTLM	(United Kingdom) Nick Tandy (United States) Tommy Milner (United Kingdom) Alexander Sims	4	All; All; 1-2, 12	DAY 1; 1	**DAY 2**; **2**	SEB; 5	**BEL**; **1**	WGL 1; 4	WGL 2; 2	LIM; 2	ELK; 3	LGA; 1	LBH; 1	**VIR**; **1**	ATL; 4	3448	2nd
2022	(United States) Corvette Racing	GTD Pro	(Spain) Antonio García (United States) Jordan Taylor (Netherlands) Nicky Catsburg	3	All; All; 1-2, 12	DAY 1; 6	DAY 2; 6	SEB; 1	**LBH**; **3**	LGA; 4	WGL; 6	MOS; 2	LIM; 4	ELK; 3	VIR; 2	PET; 5		3rd	3194
2022	(United States) Corvette Racing	GTD Pro	(United Kingdom) Nick Tandy (United States) Tommy Milner (Denmark) Marco Sørensen	4	1; 1; 1	DAY 1; 7	DAY 2; 10	SEB	LBH	LGA	WGL	MOS	LIM	ELK	VIR	PET		35th	234
2023	(United States) Corvette Racing	GTD Pro	(Spain) Antonio García (United States) Jordan Taylor (United States) Tommy Milner	3	All; All; 1-2, 11	DAY; 2	**SEB**; **5**	LBH; 2	MON; 4	WGL; 3	MOS; 1	LIM; 4	ELK; 3	VIR; 1	IMS; 5	PET; 7		3rd	3579
2024	(United States) Corvette Racing by Pratt Miller Motorsports	GTD Pro	(Spain) Antonio García (United Kingdom) Alexander Sims (Spain) Daniel Juncadella	3	All; All; 1-2, 11	DAY; 5	SEB; 10	LGA; 5	**DET**; 10	WGL; 3	**MOS**; 1	ELK; 5	VIR; 9	IMS; 3	PET; 5			3rd	2934
2024	(United States) Corvette Racing by Pratt Miller Motorsports	GTD Pro	(Netherlands) Nicky Catsburg (United States) Tommy Milner (New Zealand) Earl Bamber	4	All; All; 1-2, 11	DAY; 8	SEB; 11	**LGA**; 3	DET; 9	WGL; 7	MOS; 2	**ELK**; 6	VIR; 8	**IMS**; 11	PET; 12			8th	2674
2025	(United States) Corvette Racing by Pratt Miller Motorsports	GTD Pro	(Spain) Antonio García (United Kingdom) Alexander Sims (Spain) Daniel Juncadella	3	All; All; 1-2, 11	DAY; 2	SEB; 7	LGA; 3	DET; 2	WGL; 2	MOS; 4	ELK; 4	VIR; 1	IMS; 4	ATL; 3			1st	3265
2025	(United States) Corvette Racing by Pratt Miller Motorsports	GTD Pro	(Netherlands) Nicky Catsburg (United States) Tommy Milner (Argentina) Nicolás Varrone	4	All; All; 1-2, 11	DAY; 7	SEB; 9	LGA; 6	DET; 6	WGL; 4	MOS; 2	ELK; 10	VIR; 3	IMS; 6	ATL; 2			6th	2908

== Bibliography ==
- Dobbie, Nigel S. (2010). Corvette Racing: The GT1 Years. SilverWood Books. ISBN 978-1906236373.
- Kimble, David (2013). Corvette Racing: The Complete Competition History from Sebring to Le Mans. Motorbooks. ISBN 978-0760343432.
- Dobbie, Nigel S. (2019). Corvette Racing: The First 20 Years. SilverWood Books. ISBN 978-1781329030.
