= 2025 Michelin GT Challenge at VIR =

Ninth round of the 2025 IMSA SportsCar Championship season

The layout of Virginia International Raceway, where the race was held

The 2025 Michelin GT Challenge at VIR was a sports car race held at Virginia International Raceway in Alton, Virginia, on August 24, 2025. It was the ninth round of the 2025 IMSA SportsCar Championship.

== Background ==
=== Preview ===
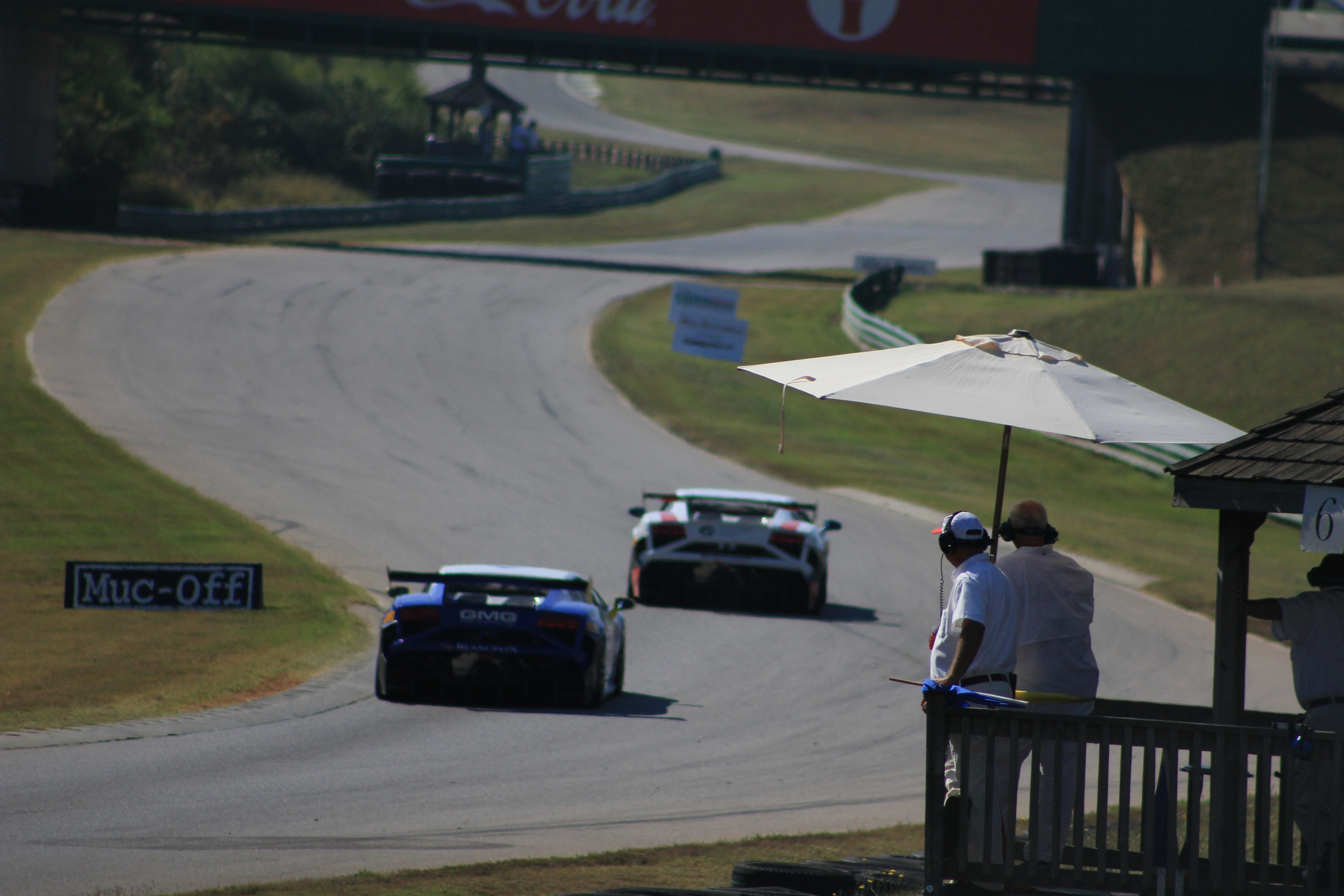
Virginia International Raceway, where the race was held

International Motor Sports Association (IMSA) president John Doonan confirmed the race was part of the 2025 IMSA SportsCar Championship (IMSA SCC) in March 2024. It was the twelfth consecutive year the IMSA SCC hosted a race at Virginia International Raceway. The 2025 Michelin GT Challenge at VIR was the ninth of eleven scheduled sports car races of 2025 by IMSA. The race was held at the seventeen-turn 3.270 mi (5.263 km) Virginia International Raceway on August 24, 2025.

=== Standings before the race ===
Preceding the event, Antonio García and Alexander Sims led the GTD Pro Drivers' Championship with 2254 points, 30 points ahead of second-placed Albert Costa. Klaus Bachler and Laurin Heinrich sat in third, 97 points behind García and Sims. Philip Ellis and Russell Ward led the GTD Drivers' Championship with 2147 points, 112 ahead of Jack Hawksworth and Parker Thompson. Casper Stevenson sat in third, a further five points behind. Corvette Racing by Pratt Miller Motorsports and Winward Racing led their respective Teams' Championships, with Chevrolet and Mercedes-AMG leading their respective Manufacturers' Championships.

== Entry list ==
The entry list was published on August 13, 2025, and featured 23 entries – 10 in GTD Pro, and 13 in GTD.

No.	Entrant	Car	Driver 1	Driver 2
GTD Pro (GT Daytona Pro) (10 entries)
1	(United States) Paul Miller Racing	BMW M4 GT3 Evo	(United States) Madison Snow	(United States) Neil Verhagen
3	(United States) Corvette Racing by Pratt Miller Motorsports	Chevrolet Corvette Z06 GT3.R	(Spain) Antonio García	(United Kingdom) Alexander Sims
4	(United States) Corvette Racing by Pratt Miller Motorsports	Chevrolet Corvette Z06 GT3.R	(Netherlands) Nicky Catsburg	(United States) Tommy Milner
9	(Canada) Pfaff Motorsports	Lamborghini Huracán GT3 Evo 2	(Italy) Andrea Caldarelli	(Italy) Marco Mapelli
14	(United States) Vasser Sullivan Racing	Lexus RC F GT3	(United Kingdom) Ben Barnicoat	(United States) Aaron Telitz
48	(United States) Paul Miller Racing	BMW M4 GT3 Evo	(United Kingdom) Dan Harper	(Germany) Max Hesse
64	(Canada) Ford Multimatic Motorsports	Ford Mustang GT3	(United Kingdom) Sebastian Priaulx	(Germany) Mike Rockenfeller
65	(Canada) Ford Multimatic Motorsports	Ford Mustang GT3	(Germany) Christopher Mies	(Belgium) Frédéric Vervisch
77	(United States) AO Racing	Porsche 911 GT3 R (992)	(Austria) Klaus Bachler	(Germany) Laurin Heinrich
81	(United States) DragonSpeed	Ferrari 296 GT3	(Italy) Giacomo Altoè	(Spain) Albert Costa
GTD (GT Daytona) (13 entries)
021	(United States) Triarsi Competizione	Ferrari 296 GT3	(United States) Kenton Koch	(United States) Onofrio Triarsi
12	(United States) Vasser Sullivan Racing	Lexus RC F GT3	(United Kingdom) Jack Hawksworth	(Canada) Parker Thompson
13	(Canada) AWA	Chevrolet Corvette Z06 GT3.R	(United Kingdom) Matt Bell	(Canada) Orey Fidani
27	(United States) Heart of Racing Team	Aston Martin Vantage AMR GT3 Evo	(United Kingdom) Tom Gamble	(United Kingdom) Casper Stevenson
34	(United States) Conquest Racing	Ferrari 296 GT3	(United States) Manny Franco	(Brazil) Daniel Serra
36	(United States) DXDT Racing	Chevrolet Corvette Z06 GT3.R	(United States) Alec Udell	(Canada) Robert Wickens
45	(United States) Wayne Taylor Racing	Lamborghini Huracán GT3 Evo 2	(Costa Rica) Danny Formal	(United States) Trent Hindman
57	(United States) Winward Racing	Mercedes-AMG GT3 Evo	(Switzerland) Philip Ellis	(United States) Russell Ward
66	(United States) Gradient Racing	Ford Mustang GT3	(United States) Jenson Altzman	(United States) Robert Megennis
70	(United Kingdom) Inception Racing	Ferrari 296 GT3	(United States) Brendan Iribe	(Denmark) Frederik Schandorff
78	(United States) Forte Racing	Lamborghini Huracán GT3 Evo 2	(Germany) Mario Farnbacher	(Canada) Misha Goikhberg
96	(United States) Turner Motorsport	BMW M4 GT3 Evo	(United States) Robby Foley	(United States) Patrick Gallagher
120	(United States) Wright Motorsports	Porsche 911 GT3 R (992)	(United States) Adam Adelson	(United States) Elliott Skeer

== Qualifying ==
=== Qualifying results ===
Pole positions in each class are indicated in bold and with ‡.

Pos.	Class	No.	Entry	Driver	Time	Gap	Grid
1	**GTD Pro**	**81**	**(United States) DragonSpeed**	**(Italy) Giacomo Altoè**	**1:44.433**	—	1‡
2	GTD Pro	1	(United States) Paul Miller Racing	(United States) Neil Verhagen	1:44.478	+0.045	2
3	GTD Pro	48	(United States) Paul Miller Racing	(United Kingdom) Dan Harper	1:44.570	+0.137	3
4	**GTD**	**12**	**(United States) Vasser Sullivan Racing**	**(United Kingdom) Jack Hawksworth**	**1:44.860**	**+0.427**	11‡
5	GTD Pro	3	(United States) Corvette Racing by Pratt Miller Motorsports	(Spain) Antonio García	1:44.886	+0.453	4
6	GTD Pro	4	(United States) Corvette Racing by Pratt Miller Motorsports	(Netherlands) Nicky Catsburg	1:44.891	+0.458	5
7	GTD Pro	64	(Canada) Ford Multimatic Motorsports	(United Kingdom) Sebastian Priaulx	1:44.992	+0.559	6
8	GTD	57	(United States) Winward Racing	(United States) Russell Ward	1:44.998	+0.565	12
9	GTD	021	(United States) Triarsi Competizione	(United States) Onofrio Triarsi	1:44.999	+0.566	13
10	GTD Pro	77	(United States) AO Racing	(Austria) Klaus Bachler	1:45.126	+0.693	7
11	GTD	27	(United States) Heart of Racing Team	(United Kingdom) Casper Stevenson	1:45.264	+0.831	14
12	GTD Pro	65	(Canada) Ford Multimatic Motorsports	(Belgium) Frédéric Vervisch	1:45.327	+0.894	8
13	GTD	34	(United States) Conquest Racing	(United States) Manny Franco	1:45.335	+0.902	15
14	GTD	96	(United States) Turner Motorsport	(United States) Patrick Gallagher	1:45.355	+0.922	16
15	GTD	45	(United States) Wayne Taylor Racing	(Costa Rica) Danny Formal	1:45.369	+0.936	17
16	GTD	36	(United States) DXDT Racing	(United States) Alec Udell	1:45.453	+1.020	18
17	GTD Pro	9	(Canada) Pfaff Motorsports	(Italy) Marco Mapelli	1:45.628	+1.195	9
18	GTD	78	(United States) Forte Racing	(Canada) Misha Goikhberg	1:45.770	+1.337	19
19	GTD Pro	14	(United States) Vasser Sullivan Racing	(United States) Aaron Telitz	1:45.922	+1.489	10
20	GTD	70	(United Kingdom) Inception Racing	(United States) Brendan Iribe	1:46.004	+1.571	20
21	GTD	66	(United States) Gradient Racing	(United States) Jenson Altzman	1:46.213	+1.780	21
22	GTD	120	(United States) Wright Motorsports	(United States) Adam Adelson	1:46.376	+1.943	22
23	GTD	13	(Canada) AWA	(Canada) Orey Fidani	1:46.814	+2.381	23

== Race ==
=== Post-race ===
The final results of GTD Pro allowed García and Sims to extend their advantage in the GTD Pro Drivers' Championship by 23 points over second-place finisher Costa. Ellis and Ward's victory allowed them to extend their advantage GTD Drivers' Championship to 271 points as Stevenson took over second. Corvette Racing by Pratt Miller Motorsports and Winward Racing continued to top their respective Teams' Championships. Chevrolet and Mercedes-AMG continued to their Manufacturers' Championship with 2 rounds remaining in the season.

Class winners are in bold and ‡.

Pos	Class	No	Team	Drivers	Chassis	Laps	Time/Retired
Pos	Class	No	Team	Drivers	Engine	Laps	Time/Retired
1	**GTD Pro**	**3**	**(United States) Corvette Racing by Pratt Miller Motorsports**	**(Spain) Antonio García (United Kingdom) Alexander Sims**	**Chevrolet Corvette Z06 GT3.R**	**81**	**2:40:22.059‡**
1	**GTD Pro**	**3**	**(United States) Corvette Racing by Pratt Miller Motorsports**	**(Spain) Antonio García (United Kingdom) Alexander Sims**	**Chevrolet LT6 5.5 L V8**	**81**	**2:40:22.059‡**
2	GTD Pro	81	(United States) DragonSpeed	(Italy) Giacomo Altoè (Spain) Albert Costa	Ferrari 296 GT3	81	+1.070
2	GTD Pro	81	(United States) DragonSpeed	(Italy) Giacomo Altoè (Spain) Albert Costa	Ferrari F163CE 3.0 L Turbo V6	81	+1.070
3	GTD Pro	4	(United States) Corvette Racing by Pratt Miller Motorsports	(Netherlands) Nicky Catsburg (United States) Tommy Milner	Chevrolet Corvette Z06 GT3.R	81	+5.036
3	GTD Pro	4	(United States) Corvette Racing by Pratt Miller Motorsports	(Netherlands) Nicky Catsburg (United States) Tommy Milner	Chevrolet LT6 5.5 L V8	81	+5.036
4	GTD Pro	64	(Canada) Ford Multimatic Motorsports	(United Kingdom) Sebastian Priaulx (Germany) Mike Rockenfeller	Ford Mustang GT3	81	+5.446
4	GTD Pro	64	(Canada) Ford Multimatic Motorsports	(United Kingdom) Sebastian Priaulx (Germany) Mike Rockenfeller	Ford Coyote 5.4 L V8	81	+5.446
5	GTD Pro	77	(United States) AO Racing	(Austria) Klaus Bachler (Germany) Laurin Heinrich	Porsche 911 GT3 R (992)	81	+10.123
5	GTD Pro	77	(United States) AO Racing	(Austria) Klaus Bachler (Germany) Laurin Heinrich	Porsche M97/80 4.2 L Flat-6	81	+10.123
6	GTD Pro	1	(United States) Paul Miller Racing	(United States) Madison Snow (United States) Neil Verhagen	BMW M4 GT3 Evo	81	+11.339
6	GTD Pro	1	(United States) Paul Miller Racing	(United States) Madison Snow (United States) Neil Verhagen	BMW P58 3.0 L Turbo I6	81	+11.339
7	GTD Pro	65	(Canada) Ford Multimatic Motorsports	(Germany) Christopher Mies (Belgium) Frédéric Vervisch	Ford Mustang GT3	81	+13.312
7	GTD Pro	65	(Canada) Ford Multimatic Motorsports	(Germany) Christopher Mies (Belgium) Frédéric Vervisch	Ford Coyote 5.4 L V8	81	+13.312
8	GTD Pro	14	(United States) Vasser Sullivan Racing	(United Kingdom) Ben Barnicoat (United States) Aaron Telitz	Lexus RC F GT3	81	+19.560
8	GTD Pro	14	(United States) Vasser Sullivan Racing	(United Kingdom) Ben Barnicoat (United States) Aaron Telitz	Toyota 2UR-GSE 5.4 L V8	81	+19.560
9	GTD Pro	9	(Canada) Pfaff Motorsports	(Italy) Andrea Caldarelli (Italy) Marco Mapelli	Lamborghini Huracán GT3 Evo 2	81	+20.113
9	GTD Pro	9	(Canada) Pfaff Motorsports	(Italy) Andrea Caldarelli (Italy) Marco Mapelli	Lamborghini DGF 5.2 L V10	81	+20.113
10	**GTD**	**57**	**(United States) Winward Racing**	**(Switzerland) Philip Ellis (United States) Russell Ward**	**Mercedes-AMG GT3 Evo**	**81**	**+21.292‡**
10	**GTD**	**57**	**(United States) Winward Racing**	**(Switzerland) Philip Ellis (United States) Russell Ward**	**Mercedes-Benz M159 6.2 L V8**	**81**	**+21.292‡**
11	GTD	021	(United States) Triarsi Competizione	(United States) Kenton Koch (United States) Onofrio Triarsi	Ferrari 296 GT3	81	+22.370
11	GTD	021	(United States) Triarsi Competizione	(United States) Kenton Koch (United States) Onofrio Triarsi	Ferrari F163CE 3.0 L Turbo V6	81	+22.370
12	GTD	27	(United States) Heart of Racing Team	(United Kingdom) Tom Gamble (United Kingdom) Casper Stevenson	Aston Martin Vantage AMR GT3 Evo	81	+23.903
12	GTD	27	(United States) Heart of Racing Team	(United Kingdom) Tom Gamble (United Kingdom) Casper Stevenson	Aston Martin M177 4.0 L Turbo V8	81	+23.903
13	GTD	96	(United States) Turner Motorsport	(United States) Robby Foley (United States) Patrick Gallagher	BMW M4 GT3 Evo	81	+25.708
13	GTD	96	(United States) Turner Motorsport	(United States) Robby Foley (United States) Patrick Gallagher	BMW P58 3.0 L Turbo I6	81	+25.708
14	GTD	66	(United States) Gradient Racing	(United States) Jenson Altzman (United States) Robert Megennis	Ford Mustang GT3	81	+28.092
14	GTD	66	(United States) Gradient Racing	(United States) Jenson Altzman (United States) Robert Megennis	Ford Coyote 5.4 L V8	81	+28.092
15	GTD	34	(United States) Conquest Racing	(United States) Manny Franco (Brazil) Daniel Serra	Ferrari 296 GT3	81	+28.457
15	GTD	34	(United States) Conquest Racing	(United States) Manny Franco (Brazil) Daniel Serra	Ferrari F163CE 3.0 L Turbo V6	81	+28.457
16	GTD	120	(United States) Wright Motorsports	(United States) Adam Adelson (United States) Elliott Skeer	Porsche 911 GT3 R (992)	81	+28.932
16	GTD	120	(United States) Wright Motorsports	(United States) Adam Adelson (United States) Elliott Skeer	Porsche M97/80 4.2 L Flat-6	81	+28.932
17	GTD	13	(Canada) AWA	(United Kingdom) Matt Bell (Canada) Orey Fidani	Chevrolet Corvette Z06 GT3.R	81	+31.423
17	GTD	13	(Canada) AWA	(United Kingdom) Matt Bell (Canada) Orey Fidani	Chevrolet LT6 5.5 L V8	81	+31.423
18	GTD	12	(United States) Vasser Sullivan Racing	(United Kingdom) Jack Hawksworth (Canada) Parker Thompson	Lexus RC F GT3	81	+33.308
18	GTD	12	(United States) Vasser Sullivan Racing	(United Kingdom) Jack Hawksworth (Canada) Parker Thompson	Toyota 2UR-GSE 5.4 L V8	81	+33.308
19	GTD	36	(United States) DXDT Racing	(United States) Alec Udell (Canada) Robert Wickens	Chevrolet Corvette Z06 GT3.R	81	+33.485
19	GTD	36	(United States) DXDT Racing	(United States) Alec Udell (Canada) Robert Wickens	Chevrolet LT6 5.5 L V8	81	+33.485
20	GTD	70	(United Kingdom) Inception Racing	(United States) Brendan Iribe (Denmark) Frederik Schandorff	Ferrari 296 GT3	81	+40.859
20	GTD	70	(United Kingdom) Inception Racing	(United States) Brendan Iribe (Denmark) Frederik Schandorff	Ferrari F163CE 3.0 L Turbo V6	81	+40.859
21	GTD	78	(United States) Forte Racing	(Germany) Mario Farnbacher (Canada) Misha Goikhberg	Lamborghini Huracán GT3 Evo 2	81	+48.983
21	GTD	78	(United States) Forte Racing	(Germany) Mario Farnbacher (Canada) Misha Goikhberg	Lamborghini DGF 5.2 L V10	81	+48.983
22 DNF	GTD	45	(United States) Wayne Taylor Racing	(Costa Rica) Danny Formal (United States) Trent Hindman	Lamborghini Huracán GT3 Evo 2	61	Fire
22 DNF	GTD	45	(United States) Wayne Taylor Racing	(Costa Rica) Danny Formal (United States) Trent Hindman	Lamborghini DGF 5.2 L V10	61	Fire
23 DNF	GTD Pro	48	(United States) Paul Miller Racing	(United Kingdom) Dan Harper (Germany) Max Hesse	BMW M4 GT3 Evo	53	Engine
23 DNF	GTD Pro	48	(United States) Paul Miller Racing	(United Kingdom) Dan Harper (Germany) Max Hesse	BMW P58 3.0 L Turbo I6	53	Engine

== Standings after the race ==
GTP Drivers' Championship standings
Pos.	+/–	Driver	Points
1		(France) Mathieu Jaminet (Australia) Matt Campbell	2314
2		(Brazil) Felipe Nasr (United Kingdom) Nick Tandy	2239
3		(Austria) Philipp Eng (Belgium) Dries Vanthoor	2133
4		(United Kingdom) Nick Yelloly (Netherlands) Renger van der Zande	2101
5		(Portugal) Filipe Albuquerque (United States) Ricky Taylor	2003

LMP2 Drivers' Championship standings
Pos.	+/–	Driver	Points
1		(United States) Dane Cameron (United States) P. J. Hyett	1682
2		(United States) Dan Goldburg	1575
3		(Brazil) Felipe Fraga (United States) Gar Robinson	1471
4		(United States) Steven Thomas	1409
5		(United States) George Kurtz	1374

GTD Pro Drivers' Championship standings
Pos.	+/–	Driver	Points
1		(Spain) Antonio García (United Kingdom) Alexander Sims	2632
2		(Spain) Albert Costa	2579
3		(Austria) Klaus Bachler (Germany) Laurin Heinrich	2441
4		(United Kingdom) Sebastian Priaulx (Germany) Mike Rockenfeller	2399
5	1	(United States) Madison Snow (United States) Neil Verhagen	2296

GTD Drivers' Championship standings
Pos.	+/–	Driver	Points
1		(Switzerland) Philip Ellis (United States) Russell Ward	2529
2	1	(United Kingdom) Casper Stevenson	2358
3	1	(United States) Kenton Koch	2301
4	2	(United Kingdom) Jack Hawksworth (Canada) Parker Thompson	2290
5		(United States) Robby Foley (United States) Patrick Gallagher	2190

Note: Only the top five positions are included for all sets of standings.

GTP Teams' Championship standings
Pos.	+/–	Team	Points
1		(Germany) #6 Porsche Penske Motorsport	2028
2		(Germany) #7 Porsche Penske Motorsport	2016
3		(United States) #24 BMW M Team RLL	1766
4		(United States) #93 Acura Meyer Shank Racing w/ Curb-Agajanian	1753
5		(United States) #10 Cadillac Wayne Taylor Racing	1749

LMP2 Teams' Championship standings
Pos.	+/–	Team	Points
1		(United States) #99 AO Racing	1682
2		(United States) #22 United Autosports USA	1575
3		(United States) #74 Riley	1471
4		(Poland) #43 Inter Europol Competition	1436
5		(France) #11 TDS Racing	1409

GTD Pro Teams' Championship standings
Pos.	+/–	Team	Points
1		(United States) #3 Corvette Racing by Pratt Miller Motorsports	2632
2		(United States) #81 DragonSpeed	2579
3		(United States) #77 AO Racing	2441
4		(Canada) #64 Ford Multimatic Motorsports	2399
5	1	(United States) #1 Paul Miller Racing	2296

GTD Teams' Championship standings
Pos.	+/–	Team	Points
1		(United States) #57 Winward Racing	2529
2	1	(United States) #27 Heart of Racing Team	2358
3	1	(United States) #12 Vasser Sullivan Racing	2290
4		(United States) #96 Turner Motorsport	2190
5		(United States) #120 Wright Motorsports	2124

Note: Only the top five positions are included for all sets of standings.

GTP Manufacturers' Championship standings
Pos.	+/–	Manufacturer	Points
1		(Germany) Porsche	2492
2		(Japan) Acura	2447
3		(Germany) BMW	2344
4		(United States) Cadillac	2302
5		(United Kingdom) Aston Martin	1725

GTD Pro Manufacturers' Championship standings
Pos.	+/–	Manufacturer	Points
1		(United States) Chevrolet	2710
2	1	(Italy) Ferrari	2629
3	1	(Germany) BMW	2605
4		(United States) Ford	2576
5		(Germany) Porsche	2533

GTD Manufacturers' Championship standings
Pos.	+/–	Manufacturer	Points
1		(Germany) Mercedes-AMG	2743
2		(Italy) Ferrari	2557
3	1	(United Kingdom) Aston Martin	2469
4	1	(Japan) Lexus	2433
5		(Germany) Porsche	2386

Note: Only the top five positions are included for all sets of standings.

IMSA SportsCar Championship
Previous race: SportsCar Grand Prix	2025 season	Next race: IMSA Battle on the Bricks
