= Pratt Miller Motorsports =

American racing team

(United States) Pratt Miller Motorsports
- Founded: 1989
- Founder(s): Pratt Miller (parent company); Gary Pratt; Jim Miller
- Base: New Hudson, Michigan, United States
- Team principal(s): Matt Carroll (CEO)
- Current series: IMSA SportsCar Championship
- Current drivers: IMSA SportsCar Championship: 3. (Spain) Antonio García (Spain) Daniel Juncadella (United Kingdom) Alexander Sims; 4. (Netherlands) Nicky Catsburg (United States) Tommy Milner (Argentina) Nicolás Varrone; 73. (Canada) Chris Cumming (Brazil) Pietro Fittipaldi (United Kingdom) Callum Ilott (Republic of Ireland) James Roe
- Teams' Championships: American Le Mans Series: 2001, 2002, 2003, 2004, 2005, 2006, 2007, 2008, 2012, 2013; Rolex Sports Car Series: 2006; Pirelli World Challenge: 2012, 2013, 2014; IMSA SportsCar Championship: 2016, 2017, 2018, 2020, 2021, 2025; FIA World Endurance Championship: 2023
- Drivers' Championships: American Le Mans Series: 2002, 2003, 2004, 2005, 2006, 2007, 2008, 2012, 2013; Rolex Sports Car Series: 2008; Pirelli World Challenge: 2015; IMSA SportsCar Championship: 2016, 2017, 2018, 2020, 2021, 2025; FIA World Endurance Championship: 2023
- Website: https://www.prattmiller.com/who-we-serve/motorsports/

Pratt Miller Motorsports is an American auto racing team that currently competes in the LMP2 and the GTD Pro classes of the IMSA SportsCar Championship. It was founded as a division of Pratt Miller Engineering by Gary Pratt and Jim Miller in 1989.

The team is best known as service provider for many of General Motors' motorsports programs, including the operation of the Corvette Racing team.

== History ==
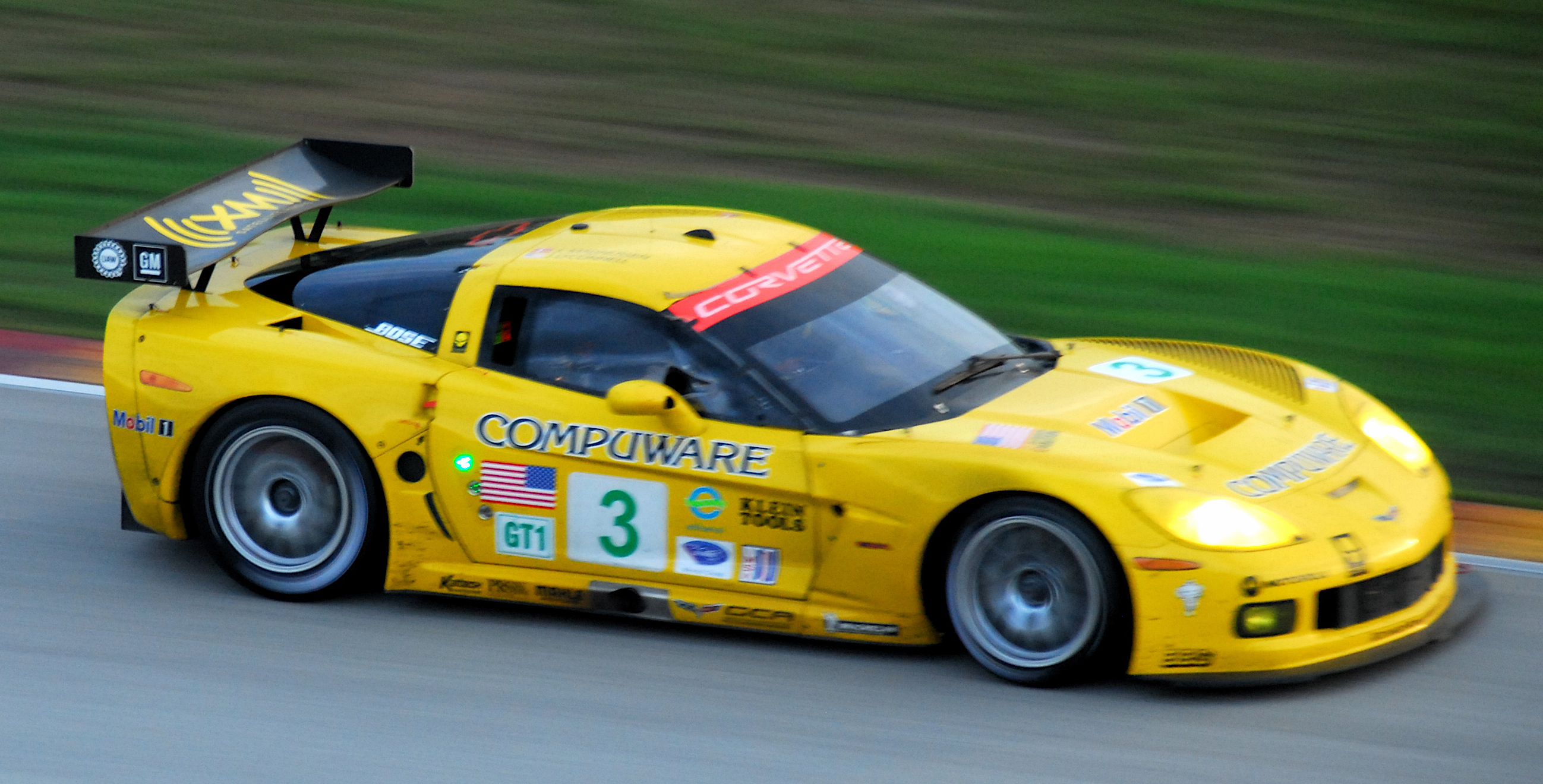
A Chevrolet Corvette C6.R.

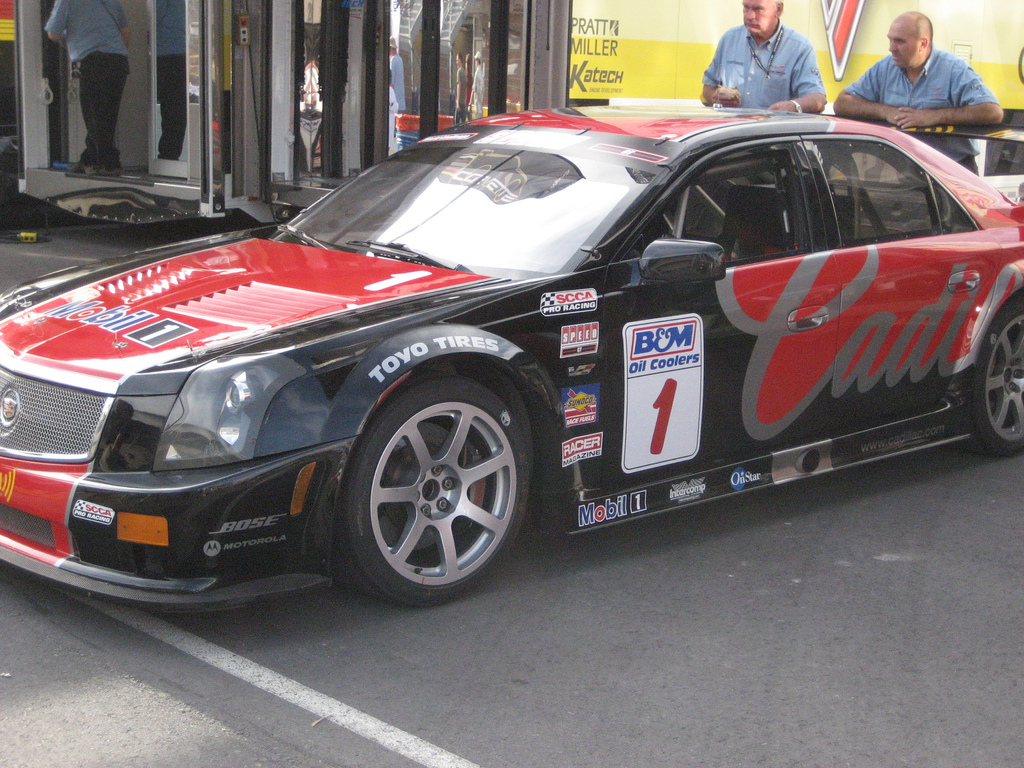
A Cadillac CTS-V.

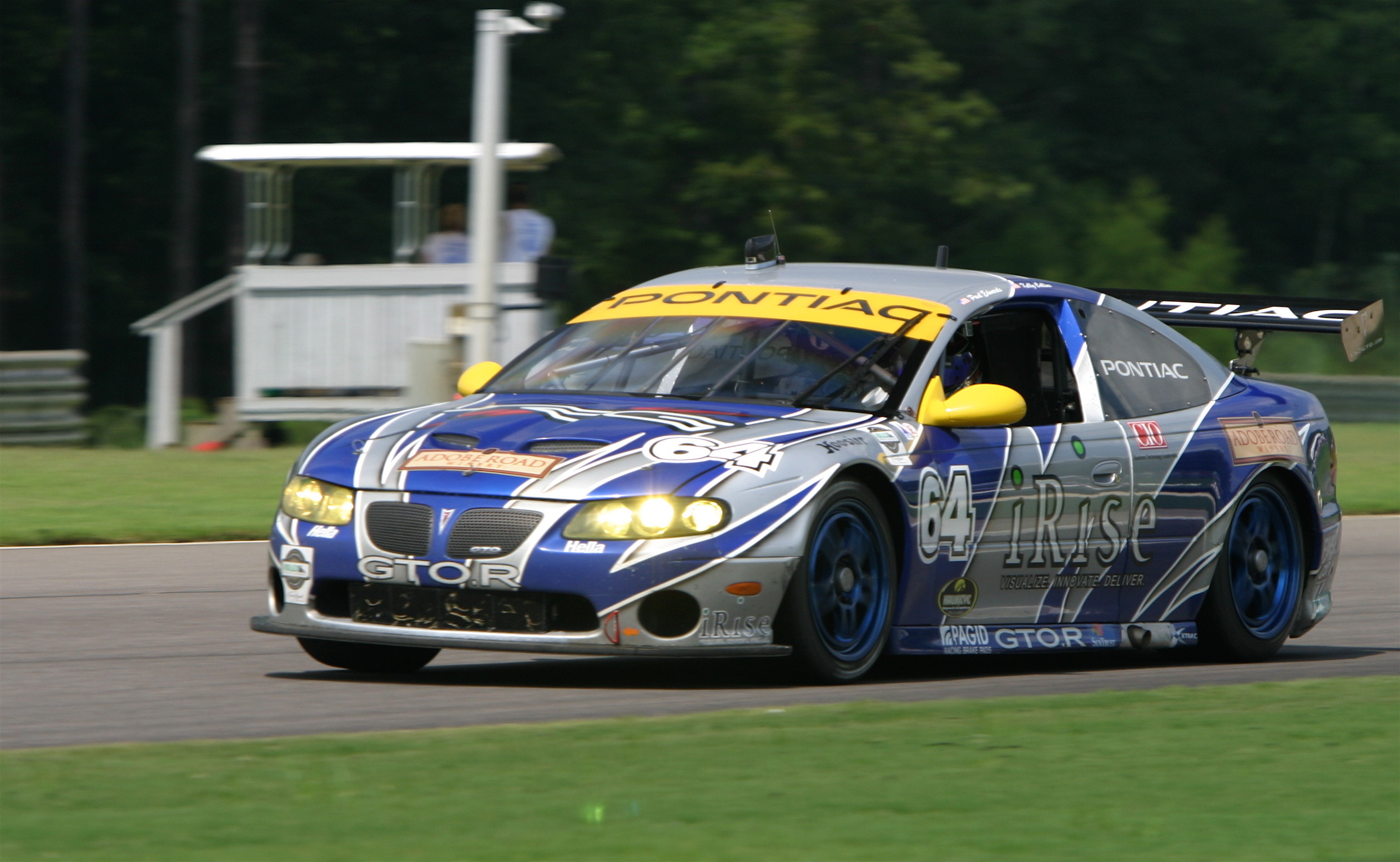
A Pontiac GTO.R.

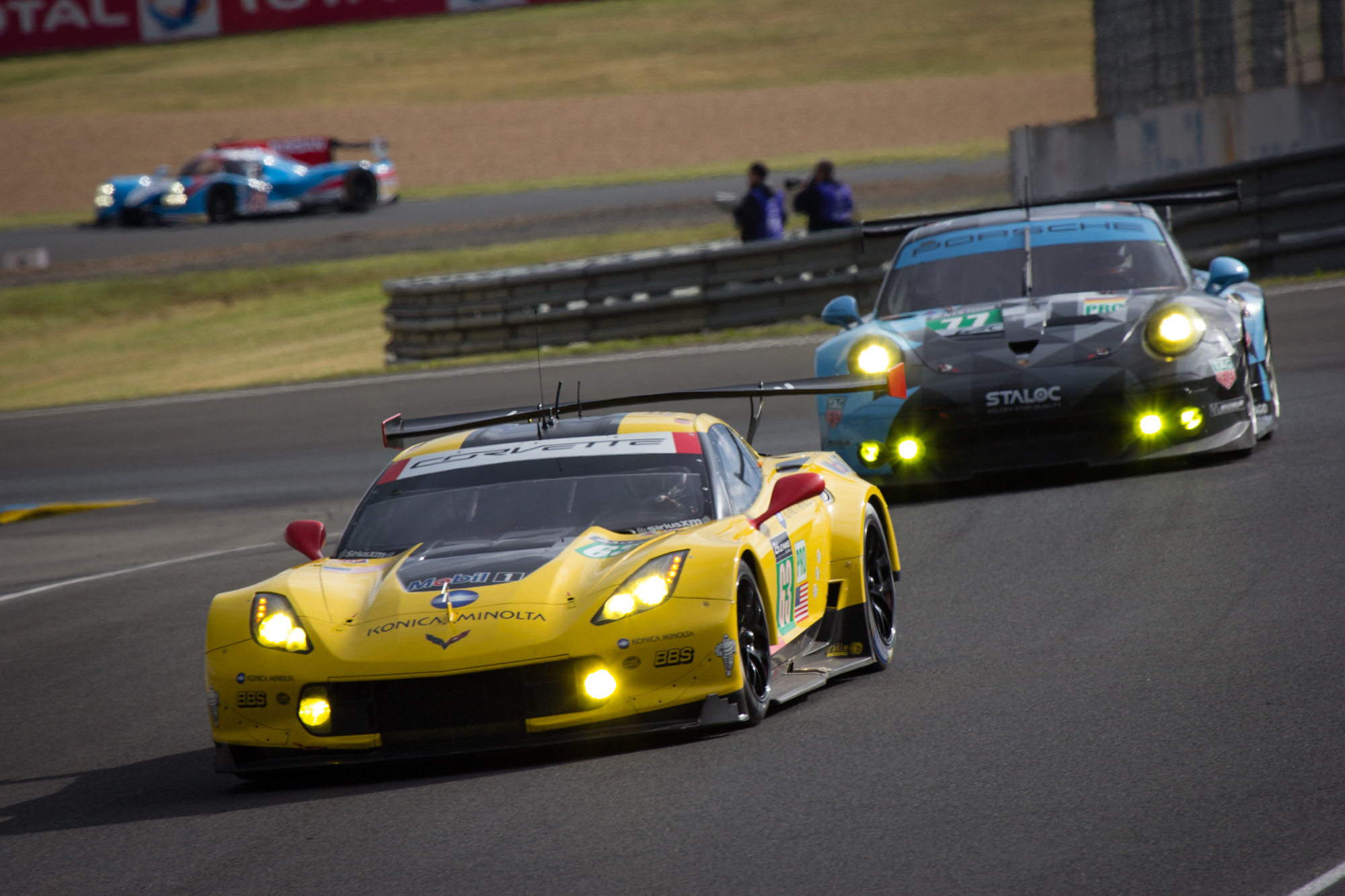
A Chevrolet Corvette C7.R

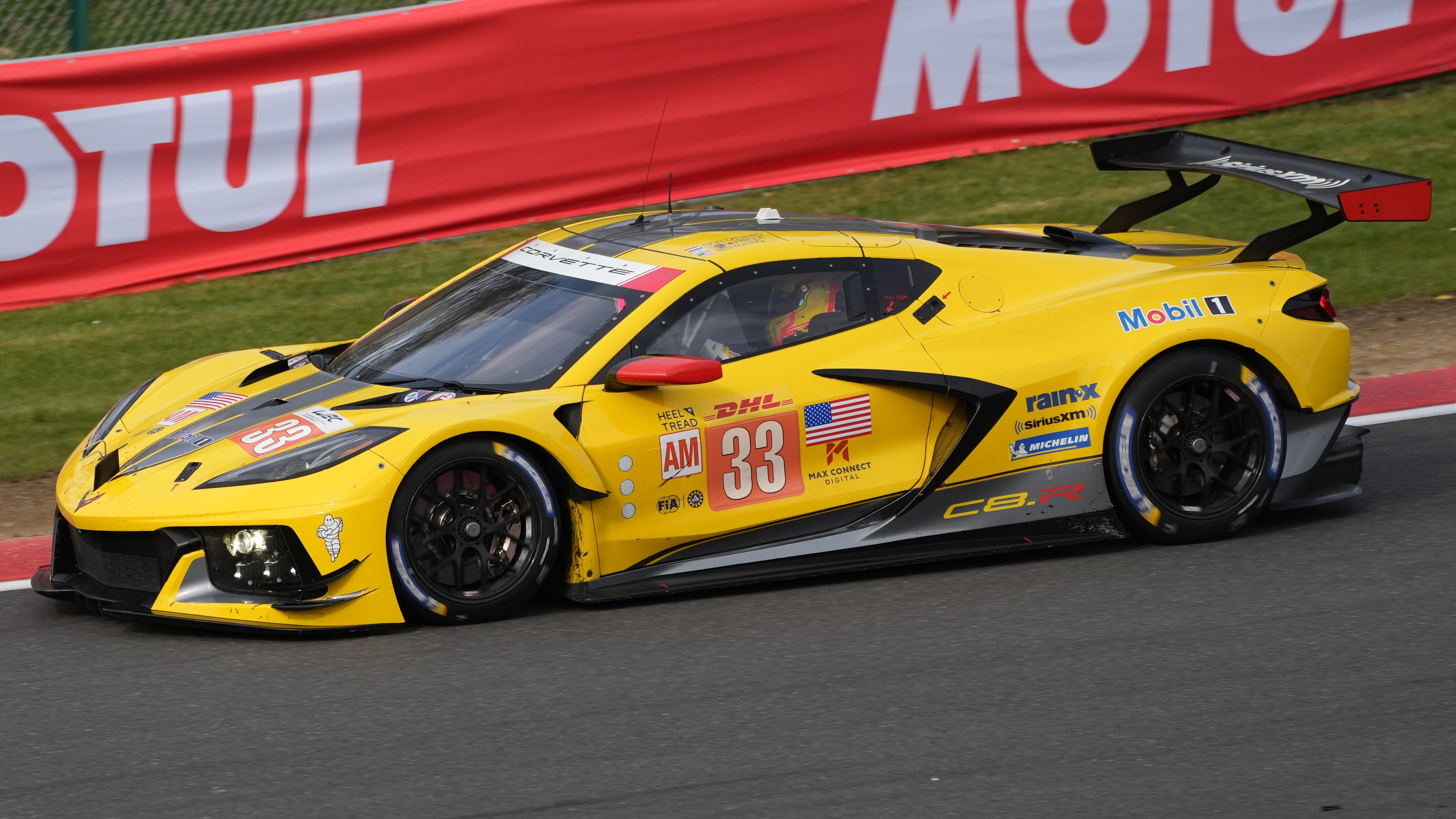
Chevrolet Corvette C8.R driven by Nicky Catsburg, Ben Keating, and Nicolás Varrone in 2023

Pratt Miller Motorsports was founded in 1989 by Gary Pratt and Jim Miller as a subsidiary of their company Pratt Miller. In 1997, the team entered a partnership with General Motors and subsidiary Chevrolet to establish a new sportscar racing program based around the Chevrolet Corvette. The partnership resulted in the founding of the Corvette Racing program in 1997.

Since their alliance with General Motors, Pratt Miller have won numerous championships and famous racing events. Corvette Racing has won the 24 Hours of Le Mans nine times, claimed the overall victory at the Rolex 24 at Daytona in 2001, and won seven straight American Le Mans Series championships. Team Cadillac won seven Pirelli World Challenge championships, while The Racer's Group, running Pratt Miller-built Pontiac GTO.Rs, won the Rolex Sports Car Series championship in 2006. GM Racing's Katech-built LS7.R small-block engine was also named the 2006 Global Motorsport Engine of the Year. Katech built the C5-R and LS7.R engines that powered the C5-R and C6.R Corvettes in the GTS/GT1 classes of ALMS and the 24 Hours of Le Mans. Following the 2009 24 Hours of Le Mans, Corvette Racing switched to the GT2 class and decided to bring the engine builds in-house. Corvette Racing won the 2012 and 2013 American Le Mans Series GT Team's and Manufacturer's Championships.

The team's exclusive racing partnership with General Motors ended in 2023, with the team beginning work with multiple partners in 2024.

=== IMSA SportsCar Championship ===
==== 2025 ====
For the 2025 IMSA SportsCar Championship, the team expanded to the LMP2 class, fielding the No. 73 Oreca 07 for Chris Cumming, Pietro Fittipaldi, Callum Ilott, and James Roe.

== Championships and Major Victories ==
- American Le Mans Series: 2001 GTS, 2002 GTS, 2003 GTS, 2004 GTS, 2005 GT1, 2006 GT1, 2007 GT1, 2008 GT1, 2012 GT, 2013 GT
- Rolex Sports Car Series: 2006 GT, 2008 GT Driver
- Pirelli World Challenge: 2012 GT, 2013 GT, 2014 GT, 2015 GT Driver
- IMSA SportsCar Championship: 2016 GTLM, 2017 GTLM, 2018 GTLM, 2020 GTLM, 2021 GTLM, 2025 GTD Pro
- FIA World Endurance Championship: 2023 LMGTE Am
- Petit Le Mans: 2000 GTS, 2001 GTS, 2002 GTS, 2004 GTS, 2005 GT1, 2007 GT1, 2008 GT1, 2010 GT2
- 24 Hours of Daytona: 2001 GTS/overall, 2015 GTLM, 2016 GTLM, 2021 GTLM
- 24 Hours of Le Mans: 2001 GTS, 2002 GTS, 2004 GTS, 2005 GT1, 2006 GT1, 2009 GT1, 2011 LMGTE Pro, 2015 LMGTE Pro, 2023 LMGTE Am
- 12 Hours of Sebring: 2002 GTS, 2003 GTS, 2004 GTS, 2006 GT1, 2007 GT1, 2008 GT1, 2009 GT1, 2013 GT, 2015 GTLM, 2016 GTLM, 2017 GTLM, 2022 GTD Pro
- 6 Hours of Watkins Glen: 2012 GT, 2013 GT, 2014 GTLM, 2021 GTLM

== Results ==
=== 24 Hours of Le Mans ===
Officially making their debut in 2000, Pratt Miller Motorsports has won the 24 Hours of Le Mans nine times.

| Year | Entrant | No. | Car | Drivers | Class | Laps | Pos. | Class Pos. |
|---|---|---|---|---|---|---|---|---|
| 2000 | (United States) Corvette Racing | 63 | Chevrolet Corvette C5-R | (United Kingdom) Justin Bell (Canada) Ron Fellows (United States) Chris Kneifel | LMGTS | 326 | 11th | 4th |
| 2000 | (United States) Corvette Racing | 64 | Chevrolet Corvette C5-R | (United States) Kelly Collins (France) Franck Fréon (United States) Andy Pilgrim | LMGTS | 327 | 10th | 3rd |
| 2001 | (United States) Corvette Racing Pratt | 63 | Chevrolet Corvette C5-R | (Canada) Ron Fellows (United States) Johnny O'Connell (United States) Scott Pruett | LMGTS | 278 | 8th | 1st |
| 2001 | (United States) Corvette Racing Pratt | 64 | Chevrolet Corvette C5-R | (United States) Kelly Collins (France) Franck Fréon (United States) Andy Pilgrim | LMGTS | 271 | 14th | 2nd |
| 2002 | (United States) Corvette Racing | 63 | Chevrolet Corvette C5-R | (Canada) Ron Fellows (United Kingdom) Oliver Gavin (United States) Johnny O'Connell | LMGTS | 335 | 11th | 1st |
| 2002 | (United States) Corvette Racing | 64 | Chevrolet Corvette C5-R | (United States) Kelly Collins (France) Franck Fréon (United States) Andy Pilgrim | LMGTS | 331 | 13th | 2nd |
| 2003 | (United States) Corvette Racing | 50 | Chevrolet Corvette C5-R | (United States) Kelly Collins (United Kingdom) Oliver Gavin (United States) Andy Pilgrim | LMGTS | 326 | 11th | 2nd |
| 2003 | (United States) Corvette Racing | 53 | Chevrolet Corvette C5-R | (Canada) Ron Fellows (France) Franck Fréon (United States) Johnny O'Connell | LMGTS | 326 | 12th | 3rd |
| 2004 | (United States) Corvette Racing | 63 | Chevrolet Corvette C5-R | (Canada) Ron Fellows (United States) Johnny O'Connell (Italy) Max Papis | LMGTS | 334 | 8th | 2nd |
| 2004 | (United States) Corvette Racing | 64 | Chevrolet Corvette C5-R | (Monaco) Olivier Beretta (United Kingdom) Oliver Gavin (Denmark) Jan Magnussen | LMGTS | 345 | 6th | 1st |
| 2005 | (United States) Corvette Racing | 63 | Chevrolet Corvette C6.R | (Canada) Ron Fellows (United States) Johnny O'Connell (Italy) Max Papis | LMGT1 | 347 | 6th | 2nd |
| 2005 | (United States) Corvette Racing | 64 | Chevrolet Corvette C6.R | (Monaco) Olivier Beretta (United Kingdom) Oliver Gavin (Denmark) Jan Magnussen | LMGT1 | 349 | 5th | 1st |
| 2006 | (United States) Corvette Racing | 63 | Chevrolet Corvette C6.R | (Canada) Ron Fellows (United States) Johnny O'Connell (Italy) Max Papis | LMGT1 | 327 | 12th | 7th |
| 2006 | (United States) Corvette Racing | 64 | Chevrolet Corvette C6.R | (Monaco) Olivier Beretta (United Kingdom) Oliver Gavin (Denmark) Jan Magnussen | LMGT1 | 355 | 4th | 1st |
| 2007 | (United States) Corvette Racing | 63 | Chevrolet Corvette C6.R | (Canada) Ron Fellows (Denmark) Jan Magnussen (United States) Johnny O'Connell | LMGT1 | 342 | 6th | 2nd |
| 2007 | (United States) Corvette Racing | 64 | Chevrolet Corvette C6.R | (Monaco) Olivier Beretta (United Kingdom) Oliver Gavin (Italy) Max Papis | LMGT1 | 22 | DNF | DNF |
| 2008 | (United States) Corvette Racing | 63 | Chevrolet Corvette C6.R | (Canada) Ron Fellows (Denmark) Jan Magnussen (United States) Johnny O'Connell | LMGT1 | 344 | 14th | 2nd |
| 2008 | (United States) Corvette Racing | 64 | Chevrolet Corvette C6.R | (Monaco) Olivier Beretta (United Kingdom) Oliver Gavin (Italy) Max Papis | LMGT1 | 341 | 15th | 3rd |
| 2009 | (United States) Corvette Racing | 63 | Chevrolet Corvette C6.R | (Spain) Antonio García (Denmark) Jan Magnussen (United States) Johnny O'Connell | LMGT1 | 342 | 15th | 1st |
| 2009 | (United States) Corvette Racing | 64 | Chevrolet Corvette C6.R | (Monaco) Olivier Beretta (Switzerland) Marcel Fässler (United Kingdom) Oliver Gavin | LMGT1 | 311 | DNF | DNF |
| 2010 | (United States) Corvette Racing | 63 | Chevrolet Corvette C6.R | (Spain) Antonio García (Denmark) Jan Magnussen (United States) Johnny O'Connell | LMGT2 | 225 | DNF | DNF |
| 2010 | (United States) Corvette Racing | 64 | Chevrolet Corvette C6.R | (Monaco) Olivier Beretta (France) Emmanuel Collard (United Kingdom) Oliver Gavin | LMGT2 | 255 | DNF | DNF |
| 2011 | (United States) Corvette Racing | 73 | Chevrolet Corvette C6.R | (Monaco) Olivier Beretta (Spain) Antonio García (United States) Tommy Milner | LMGTE Pro | 314 | 11th | 1st |
| 2011 | (United States) Corvette Racing | 74 | Chevrolet Corvette C6.R | (United Kingdom) Oliver Gavin (Denmark) Jan Magnussen (United Kingdom) Richard Westbrook | LMGTE Pro | 211 | DNF | DNF |
| 2012 | (United States) Corvette Racing | 73 | Chevrolet Corvette C6.R | (Spain) Antonio García (Denmark) Jan Magnussen (United States) Jordan Taylor | LMGTE Pro | 326 | 23rd | 5th |
| 2012 | (United States) Corvette Racing | 74 | Chevrolet Corvette C6.R | (United Kingdom) Oliver Gavin (United States) Tommy Milner (United Kingdom) Richard Westbrook | LMGTE Pro | 215 | NC | NC |
| 2013 | (United States) Corvette Racing | 73 | Chevrolet Corvette C6.R | (Spain) Antonio García (Denmark) Jan Magnussen (United States) Jordan Taylor | LMGTE Pro | 312 | 19th | 4th |
| 2013 | (United States) Corvette Racing | 74 | Chevrolet Corvette C6.R | (United Kingdom) Oliver Gavin (United States) Tommy Milner (United Kingdom) Richard Westbrook | LMGTE Pro | 309 | 22nd | 7th |
| 2014 | (United States) Corvette Racing | 73 | Chevrolet Corvette C7.R | (Spain) Antonio García (Denmark) Jan Magnussen (United States) Jordan Taylor | LMGTE Pro | 338 | 16th | 2nd |
| 2014 | (United States) Corvette Racing | 74 | Chevrolet Corvette C7.R | (United Kingdom) Oliver Gavin (United States) Tommy Milner (United Kingdom) Richard Westbrook | LMGTE Pro | 333 | 20th | 4th |
| 2015 | (United States) Corvette Racing – GM | 63 | Chevrolet Corvette C7.R | (Australia) Ryan Briscoe (Spain) Antonio García (Denmark) Jan Magnussen | LMGTE Pro | 0 | WD | WD |
| 2015 | (United States) Corvette Racing – GM | 64 | Chevrolet Corvette C7.R | (United Kingdom) Oliver Gavin (United States) Tommy Milner (United States) Jordan Taylor | LMGTE Pro | 337 | 17th | 1st |
| 2016 | (United States) Corvette Racing – GM | 63 | Chevrolet Corvette C7.R | (Spain) Antonio García (Denmark) Jan Magnussen (United States) Ricky Taylor | LMGTE Pro | 336 | 25th | 7th |
| 2016 | (United States) Corvette Racing – GM | 64 | Chevrolet Corvette C7.R | (United Kingdom) Oliver Gavin (United States) Tommy Milner (United States) Jordan Taylor | LMGTE Pro | 219 | DNF | DNF |
| 2017 | (United States) Corvette Racing – GM | 63 | Chevrolet Corvette C7.R | (Spain) Antonio García (Denmark) Jan Magnussen (United States) Jordan Taylor | LMGTE Pro | 340 | 19th | 3rd |
| 2017 | (United States) Corvette Racing – GM | 64 | Chevrolet Corvette C7.R | (Switzerland) Marcel Fässler (United Kingdom) Oliver Gavin (United States) Tommy Milner | LMGTE Pro | 335 | 24th | 8th |
| 2018 | (United States) Corvette Racing – GM | 63 | Chevrolet Corvette C7.R | (Spain) Antonio García (Denmark) Jan Magnussen (Germany) Mike Rockenfeller | LMGTE Pro | 342 | 18th | 4th |
| 2018 | (United States) Corvette Racing – GM | 64 | Chevrolet Corvette C7.R | (Switzerland) Marcel Fässler (United Kingdom) Oliver Gavin (United States) Tommy Milner | LMGTE Pro | 259 | DNF | DNF |
| 2019 | (United States) Corvette Racing | 63 | Chevrolet Corvette C7.R | (Spain) Antonio García (Denmark) Jan Magnussen (Germany) Mike Rockenfeller | LMGTE Pro | 337 | 28th | 8th |
| 2019 | (United States) Corvette Racing | 64 | Chevrolet Corvette C7.R | (Switzerland) Marcel Fässler (United Kingdom) Oliver Gavin (United States) Tommy Milner | LMGTE Pro | 82 | DNF | DNF |
| 2021 | (United States) Corvette Racing | 63 | Chevrolet Corvette C8.R | (Netherlands) Nicky Catsburg (Spain) Antonio García (United States) Jordan Taylor | LMGTE Pro | 345 | 21st | 2nd |
| 2021 | (United States) Corvette Racing | 64 | Chevrolet Corvette C8.R | (United States) Tommy Milner (United Kingdom) Alexander Sims (United Kingdom) Nick Tandy | LMGTE Pro | 313 | 44th | 6th |
| 2022 | (United States) Corvette Racing | 63 | Chevrolet Corvette C8.R | (Netherlands) Nicky Catsburg (Spain) Antonio García (United States) Jordan Taylor | LMGTE Pro | 214 | DNF | DNF |
| 2022 | (United States) Corvette Racing | 64 | Chevrolet Corvette C8.R | (United States) Tommy Milner (United Kingdom) Alexander Sims (United Kingdom) Nick Tandy | LMGTE Pro | 260 | DNF | DNF |
| 2023 | (United States) Corvette Racing | 33 | Chevrolet Corvette C8.R | (Netherlands) Nicky Catsburg (United States) Ben Keating (Argentina) Nicolás Varrone | LMGTE Am | 313 | 26th | 1st |

==== Le Mans wins by Corvette generation ====
| Vehicle | Active | Wins |
|---|---|---|
| Corvette C5-R | 2000–2004 | 3 (2001, 2002, 2004) |
| Corvette C6.R | 2005–2013 | 4 (2005, 2006, 2009, 2011) |
| Corvette C7.R | 2014–2019 | 1 (2015) |
| Corvette C8.R | 2021–2023 | 1 (2023) |
| Corvette Z06 GT3.R | 2024–present | 1 (2026) |

== IMSA racing results ==
=== Complete IMSA SportsCar Championship results ===
(key) Races in bold indicates pole position. Races in italics indicates fastest lap.

| Year | Entrant | Class | Drivers | No. | Rds. | Rounds | | | | | | | | | | | | Pts. | Pos. |
| Year | Entrant | Class | Drivers | No. | Rds. | 1 | 2 | 3 | 4 | 5 | 6 | 7 | 8 | 9 | 10 | 11 | 12 | Pts. | Pos. |
|---|---|---|---|---|---|---|---|---|---|---|---|---|---|---|---|---|---|---|---|
| 2014 | (United States) Corvette Racing | GTLM | (Spain) Antonio García (Denmark) Jan Magnussen (Australia) Ryan Briscoe (United States) Jordan Taylor | 3 | All; 1-4, 7-10, 12-13; 1-2, 13; 11 | DAY; 10 | SEB; 8 | **LBH**; **1** | **LGA**; **1** | WGL; 1 | MOS; 1 | IMS; 4 | ELK; 6 | VIR; 7 | COA; 9 | ATL; 8 | | 317 | 2nd |
| 2014 | (United States) Corvette Racing | GTLM | (United Kingdom) Oliver Gavin (United States) Tommy Milner (United Kingdom) Robin Liddell (Australia) Ryan Briscoe | 4 | All; All; 1-2; 13 | DAY; 5 | SEB; 6 | LBH; 3 | LGA; 5 | WGL; 5 | MOS; 7 | IMS; 5 | ELK; 7 | VIR; 9 | COA; 10 | ATL; 4 | | 291 | 8th |
| 2015 | (United States) Corvette Racing | GTLM | (Spain) Antonio García (Denmark) Jan Magnussen (Australia) Ryan Briscoe | 3 | All; All; 1-2, 12 | DAY; 1 | SEB; 1 | LBH; 3 | LGA; 7 | **WGL**; **4** | MOS; 3 | ELK; 4 | VIR; 6 | COA; 6 | ATL; 6 | | | 295 | 3rd |
| 2015 | (United States) Corvette Racing | GTLM | (United Kingdom) Oliver Gavin (United States) Tommy Milner (France) Simon Pagenaud (Australia) Ryan Briscoe | 4 | All; All; 1-2; 12 | **DAY**; **3** | SEB; 9 | LBH; 7 | LGA; 6 | WGL; 7 | MOS; 5 | ELK; 7 | VIR; 8 | COA; 8 | ATL; 3 | | | 261 | 8th |
| 2016 | (United States) Corvette Racing | GTLM | (Spain) Antonio García (Denmark) Jan Magnussen (Germany) Mike Rockenfeller | 3 | All; All; 1-2, 12 | DAY; 2 | SEB; 9 | LBH; 9 | LGA; 4 | WGL; 7 | MOS; 3 | LIM; 2 | ELK; 6 | **VIR**; **1** | COA; 3 | ATL; 4 | | 319 | 3rd |
| 2016 | (United States) Corvette Racing | GTLM | (United Kingdom) Oliver Gavin (United States) Tommy Milner (Switzerland) Marcel Fässler | 4 | All; All; 1-2, 12 | DAY; 1 | SEB; 1 | LBH; 2 | LGA; 7 | WGL; 4 | MOS; 2 | LIM; 1 | ELK; 1 | VIR; 9 | COA; 5 | ATL; 3 | | 345 | 1st |
| 2017 | (United States) Corvette Racing | GTLM | (Spain) Antonio García (Denmark) Jan Magnussen (Germany) Mike Rockenfeller | 3 | All; All; 1-2, 12 | DAY; 4 | SEB; 1 | **LBH**; **5** | COA; 1 | WGL; 3 | MOS; 4 | LIM; 4 | ELK; 4 | VIR; 1 | LGA; 4 | ATL; 2 | | 344 | 1st |
| 2017 | (United States) Corvette Racing | GTLM | (United Kingdom) Oliver Gavin (United States) Tommy Milner (Switzerland) Marcel Fässler | 4 | All; All; 1-2, 12 | DAY; 9 | SEB; 10 | LBH; 1 | COA; 7 | WGL; 5 | MOS; 8 | LIM; 8 | ELK; 5 | VIR; 6 | LGA; 9 | ATL; 4 | | 276 | 8th |
| 2018 | (United States) Corvette Racing | GTLM | (Spain) Antonio García (Denmark) Jan Magnussen (Germany) Mike Rockenfeller (Switzerland) Marcel Fässler | 3 | All; All; 1-2; 12 | **DAY**; **3** | SEB; 8 | LBH; 4 | MOH; 3 | WGL; 2 | MOS; 2 | **LIM**; **2** | ELK; 3 | VIR; 2 | LGA; 3 | ATL; 8 | | 322 | 1st |
| 2018 | (United States) Corvette Racing | GTLM | (United Kingdom) Oliver Gavin (United States) Tommy Milner (Switzerland) Marcel Fässler | 4 | All; All; 1-2, 12 | DAY; 4 | SEB; 6 | LBH; 1 | MOH; 8 | WGL; 5 | MOS; 3 | LIM; 4 | ELK; 2 | VIR; 6 | **LGA**; **5** | ATL; 2 | | 310 | 3rd |
| 2019 | (United States) Corvette Racing | GTLM | (Spain) Antonio García (Denmark) Jan Magnussen (Germany) Mike Rockenfeller | 3 | All; All; 1-2, 12 | DAY; 6 | SEB; 3 | LBH; 2 | MOH; 2 | **WGL**; **2** | MOS; 7 | LIM; 5 | **ELK**; **4** | VIR; 3 | LGA; 3 | ATL; 4 | | 317 | 3rd |
| 2019 | (United States) Corvette Racing | GTLM | (United Kingdom) Oliver Gavin (United States) Tommy Milner (Switzerland) Marcel Fässler | 4 | All; 1-4, 6, 9-12; 1-2, 7-8, 12 | DAY; 8 | SEB; 8 | LBH; 3 | MOH; 8 | WGL; 8 | MOS; 8 | LIM; 6 | ELK; 6 | VIR; 4 | LGA; 4 | ATL; 7 | | 275 | 8th |
| 2020 | (United States) Corvette Racing | GTLM | (Spain) Antonio García (United States) Jordan Taylor (Netherlands) Nicky Catsburg | 3 | All; All; 1, 9, 11 | DAY 1; 4 | DAY 2; 1 | **SEB 1**; **2** | ELK; 1 | VIR; 1 | ATL 1; 5 | **MOH**; **1** | **CLT**; **1** | **ATL 2**; **2** | **LGA**; **2** | **SEB 2**; **5** | | 351 | 1st |
| 2020 | (United States) Corvette Racing | GTLM | (United Kingdom) Oliver Gavin (United States) Tommy Milner (Switzerland) Marcel Fässler | 4 | All; All; 1, 9, 11 | DAY 1; 7 | **DAY 2**; **5** | SEB 1; 1 | ELK; 2 | VIR; 4 | ATL 1; 2 | MOH; 2 | CLT; 4 | ATL 2; 4 | LGA; 6 | SEB 2; 6 | | 315 | 3rd |
| 2021 | (United States) Corvette Racing | GTLM | (Spain) Antonio García (United States) Jordan Taylor (Netherlands) Nicky Catsburg | 3 | All; All; 1-2, 12 | DAY 1; 2 | DAY 2; 1 | **SEB**; **4** | BEL; 2 | **WGL 1**; **1** | **WGL 2**; **1** | **LIM**; **1** | **ELK**; **2** | **LGA**; **2** | **LBH**; **2** | VIR; 2 | ATL; 6 | 3549 | 1st |
| 2021 | (United States) Corvette Racing | GTLM | (United Kingdom) Nick Tandy (United States) Tommy Milner (United Kingdom) Alexander Sims | 4 | All; All; 1-2, 12 | DAY 1; 1 | **DAY 2**; **2** | SEB; 5 | **BEL**; **1** | WGL 1; 4 | WGL 2; 2 | LIM; 2 | ELK; 3 | LGA; 1 | LBH; 1 | **VIR**; **1** | ATL; 4 | 3448 | 2nd |
| 2022 | (United States) Corvette Racing | GTD Pro | (Spain) Antonio García (United States) Jordan Taylor (Netherlands) Nicky Catsburg | 3 | All; All; 1-2, 12 | DAY 1; 6 | DAY 2; 6 | SEB; 1 | **LBH**; **3** | LGA; 4 | WGL; 6 | MOS; 2 | LIM; 4 | ELK; 3 | VIR; 2 | PET; 5 | | 3rd | 3194 |
| 2022 | (United States) Corvette Racing | GTD Pro | (United Kingdom) Nick Tandy (United States) Tommy Milner (Denmark) Marco Sørensen | 4 | 1; 1; 1 | DAY 1; 7 | DAY 2; 10 | SEB | LBH | LGA | WGL | MOS | LIM | ELK | VIR | PET | | 35th | 234 |
| 2023 | (United States) Corvette Racing | GTD Pro | (Spain) Antonio García (United States) Jordan Taylor (United States) Tommy Milner | 3 | All; All; 1-2, 11 | DAY; 2 | **SEB**; **5** | LBH; 2 | MON; 4 | WGL; 3 | MOS; 1 | LIM; 4 | ELK; 3 | VIR; 1 | IMS; 5 | PET; 7 | | 3rd | 3579 |
| 2024 | (United States) Corvette Racing by Pratt Miller Motorsports | GTD Pro | (Spain) Antonio García (United Kingdom) Alexander Sims (Spain) Daniel Juncadella | 3 | All; All; 1-2, 11 | DAY; 5 | SEB; 10 | LGA; 5 | **DET**; 10 | WGL; 3 | **MOS**; 1 | ELK; 5 | VIR; 9 | IMS; 3 | PET; 5 | | | 3rd | 2934 |
| 2024 | (United States) Corvette Racing by Pratt Miller Motorsports | GTD Pro | (Netherlands) Nicky Catsburg (United States) Tommy Milner (New Zealand) Earl Bamber | 4 | All; All; 1-2, 11 | DAY; 8 | SEB; 11 | **LGA**; 3 | DET; 9 | WGL; 7 | MOS; 2 | **ELK**; 6 | VIR; 8 | **IMS**; 11 | PET; 12 | | | 8th | 2674 |
| 2025 | (United States) Pratt Miller Motorsports | LMP2 | (Canada) Chris Cumming (Brazil) Pietro Fittipaldi (Republic of Ireland) James Roe (United Kingdom) Callum Ilott (Portugal) Manuel Espírito Santo | 73 | All; All; 1-2, 10–1; 1; 6 | DAY; 9 | SEB; 11 | | | WGL; 7 | MOS; 6 | ELK; 8 | | IMS; 9 | ATL; 7 | | | 11th | 1756 |
| 2025 | (United States) Corvette Racing by Pratt Miller Motorsports | GTD Pro | (Spain) Antonio García (United Kingdom) Alexander Sims (Spain) Daniel Juncadella | 3 | All; All; 1-2, 11 | DAY; 2 | SEB; 7 | LGA; 3 | DET; 2 | WGL; 2 | MOS; 4 | ELK; 4 | VIR; 1 | IMS; 4 | ATL; 3 | | | 1st | 3265 |
| 2025 | (United States) Corvette Racing by Pratt Miller Motorsports | GTD Pro | (Netherlands) Nicky Catsburg (United States) Tommy Milner (Argentina) Nicolás Varrone | 4 | All; All; 1-2, 11 | DAY; 7 | SEB; 9 | LGA; 6 | DET; 6 | WGL; 4 | MOS; 2 | ELK; 10 | VIR; 3 | IMS; 6 | ATL; 2 | | | 6th | 2908 |
