= 2025 Chevrolet Detroit Sports Car Classic =

Fifth round of the 2025 IMSA SportsCar Championship season

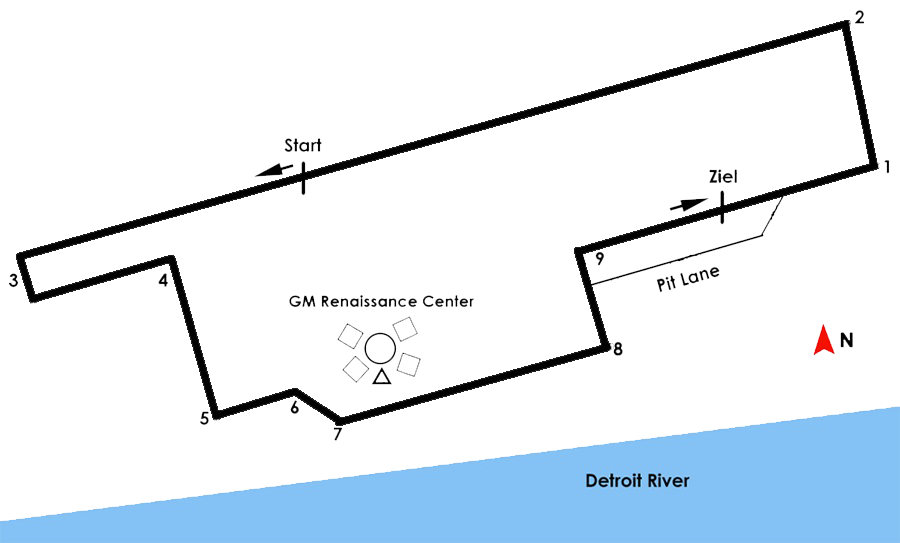
The layout of the Detroit street circuit, where the race was held

The 2025 Chevrolet Detroit Sports Car Classic was a sports car race held at the Detroit street circuit in Detroit, Michigan, on May 31, 2025. It was the fifth round of the 2025 IMSA SportsCar Championship.

== Background ==
=== Preview ===
International Motor Sports Association (IMSA) president John Doonan confirmed the race was part of the schedule of the 2025 IMSA SportsCar Championship (IMSA SCC) in March 2024. It was the tenth time the IMSA SCC hosted a race in Detroit, and the second consecutive time the race was hosted at the Detroit street circuit. The 2025 Detroit Sports Car Classic was the fifth of eleven scheduled sports car races of 2025 by IMSA. The race was held at the ten-turn 1.645 mi (2.647 km) Detroit street circuit on May 31, 2025.

=== Standings before the race ===
Prior to the race, Felipe Nasr and Nick Tandy led the GTP Drivers' Championship with 1490 points, 91 points ahead of Porsche team-mates Matt Campbell and Mathieu Jaminet. Philipp Eng and Dries Vanthoor sat in third, 280 points behind Nasr and Tandy. The GTD Pro Drivers' Championship was led by Klaus Bachler and Laurin Heinrich with 1014 points, 70 points ahead of second-placed Antonio García and Alexander Sims. Porsche Penske Motorsport and AO Racing led their respective Teams' Championships, with Porsche leading the Manufacturers' Championship in both the GTP and GTD Pro classes.

== Entry list ==
The entry list was published on May 21, 2025, and featured 22 entries: 11 in both GTP and GTD Pro. Giacomo Altoè was originally listed to compete for DragonSpeed in the No. 81 entry, but was replaced last minute by Rasmus Lindh.

No.	Entrant	Car	Driver 1	Driver 2
GTP (Grand Touring Prototype) (11 entries)
6	(Germany) Porsche Penske Motorsport	Porsche 963	(Australia) Matt Campbell	(France) Mathieu Jaminet
7	(Germany) Porsche Penske Motorsport	Porsche 963	(Brazil) Felipe Nasr	(United Kingdom) Nick Tandy
10	(United States) Cadillac Wayne Taylor Racing	Cadillac V-Series.R	(Portugal) Filipe Albuquerque	(United States) Ricky Taylor
23	(United States) Aston Martin THOR Team	Aston Martin Valkyrie	(Canada) Roman De Angelis	(United Kingdom) Ross Gunn
24	(United States) BMW M Team RLL	BMW M Hybrid V8	(Austria) Philipp Eng	(Belgium) Dries Vanthoor
25	(United States) BMW M Team RLL	BMW M Hybrid V8	(South Africa) Sheldon van der Linde	(Germany) Marco Wittmann
31	(United States) Cadillac Whelen	Cadillac V-Series.R	(United Kingdom) Jack Aitken	(New Zealand) Earl Bamber
40	(United States) Cadillac Wayne Taylor Racing	Cadillac V-Series.R	(Switzerland) Louis Delétraz	(United States) Jordan Taylor
60	(United States) Acura Meyer Shank Racing w/ Curb-Agajanian	Acura ARX-06	(United Kingdom) Tom Blomqvist	(United States) Colin Braun
85	(United States) JDC–Miller MotorSports	Porsche 963	(Italy) Gianmaria Bruni	(Netherlands) Tijmen van der Helm
93	(United States) Acura Meyer Shank Racing w/ Curb-Agajanian	Acura ARX-06	(United Kingdom) Nick Yelloly	(Netherlands) Renger van der Zande
GTD Pro (GT Daytona Pro) (11 entries)
1	(United States) Paul Miller Racing	BMW M4 GT3 Evo	(United States) Madison Snow	(United States) Neil Verhagen
3	(United States) Corvette Racing by Pratt Miller Motorsports	Chevrolet Corvette Z06 GT3.R	(Spain) Antonio García	(United Kingdom) Alexander Sims
4	(United States) Corvette Racing by Pratt Miller Motorsports	Chevrolet Corvette Z06 GT3.R	(Netherlands) Nicky Catsburg	(United States) Tommy Milner
9	(Canada) Pfaff Motorsports	Lamborghini Huracán GT3 Evo 2	(Italy) Andrea Caldarelli	(Italy) Marco Mapelli
14	(United States) Vasser Sullivan Racing	Lexus RC F GT3	(United Kingdom) Jack Hawksworth	(United States) Aaron Telitz
15	(United States) Vasser Sullivan Racing	Lexus RC F GT3	(United States) Frankie Montecalvo	(Canada) Parker Thompson
48	(United States) Paul Miller Racing	BMW M4 GT3 Evo	(United Kingdom) Dan Harper	(Germany) Max Hesse
64	(Canada) Ford Multimatic Motorsports	Ford Mustang GT3	(United Kingdom) Sebastian Priaulx	(Germany) Mike Rockenfeller
65	(Canada) Ford Multimatic Motorsports	Ford Mustang GT3	(Germany) Christopher Mies	(Belgium) Frédéric Vervisch
77	(United States) AO Racing	Porsche 911 GT3 R (992)	(Austria) Klaus Bachler	(Germany) Laurin Heinrich
81	(United States) DragonSpeed	Ferrari 296 GT3	(Spain) Albert Costa	(Sweden) Rasmus Lindh

== Practice ==
There were three practice sessions preceding the start of the race on Saturday, two on Friday and one on Saturday. The first session lasted 90 minutes on Friday morning, the second session lasted 120 minutes on Friday afternoon. The final practice session lasted 20 minutes on Saturday morning.

=== Practice 1 ===
The first practice session took place at 8:00 am ET on Friday and ended with Jack Aitken topping the charts for Cadillac Whelen, with a lap time of 1:07.254, ahead of the No. 93 Acura of Renger van der Zande. GTD Pro was topped by Alexander Sims with a time of 1:10.818, ahead of the sister Corvette Racing Chevrolet of Nicky Catsburg. The session was stopped once when the No. 40 Cadillac Wayne Taylor Racing Cadillac and the No. 9 Pfaff Motorsports Lamborghini went off at turn 1.

Pos.	Class	No.	Team	Driver	Time	Gap
1	GTP	31	(United States) Cadillac Whelen	(United Kingdom) Jack Aitken	1:07.254	—
2	GTP	93	(United States) Acura Meyer Shank Racing w/ Curb-Agajanian	(Netherlands) Renger van der Zande	1:07.605	+0.351
3	GTP	7	(Germany) Porsche Penske Motorsport	(United Kingdom) Nick Tandy	1:07.651	+0.397

=== Practice 2 ===
The second practice session took place at 11:30 pm ET on Friday and ended with Sheldon van der Linde topping the charts for BMW M Team RLL, with a lap time of 1:06.427. Nick Tandy in the No. 7 Porsche Penske Motorsport Porsche set the second fastest time of 1:06.720. Antonio García led the way in GTD Pro with a time of 1:10.565 in the No. 3 Chevrolet followed closely by his teammate, Tommy Milner, in the No. 4 Chevrolet with a time of 1:10.575. There were three red flags in the session, two for debris and one for an incident by the No. 10 Cadillac of Filipe Albuquerque.

Pos.	Class	No.	Team	Driver	Time	Gap
1	GTP	25	(United States) BMW M Team RLL	(South Africa) Sheldon van der Linde	1:06.427	—
2	GTP	7	(Germany) Porsche Penske Motorsport	(United Kingdom) Nick Tandy	1:06.720	+0.293
3	GTP	24	(United States) BMW M Team RLL	(Belgium) Dries Vanthoor	1:06.765	+0.338

=== Practice 3 ===
The third and final practice session took place at 10:35 pm ET on Saturday and ended with Nick Tandy in the No. 7 Porsche fastest of the session with a time of 1:08.552 followed by Dries Vanthoor in the No. 24 BMW M Team RLL BMW in second. Marco Mapelli, in the No. 9 Pfaff Motorsports Lamborghini led the way in GTD Pro with a lap time of 1:11.116.

Pos.	Class	No.	Team	Driver	Time	Gap
1	GTP	7	(Germany) Porsche Penske Motorsport	(United Kingdom) Nick Tandy	1:08.552	—
2	GTP	24	(United States) BMW M Team RLL	(Belgium) Dries Vanthoor	1:08.598	+0.046
3	GTP	6	(Germany) Porsche Penske Motorsport	(France) Mathieu Jaminet	1:08.720	+0.168

== Qualifying ==
Friday's afternoon qualifying was broken into two sessions, with one session for both the GTP and GTD classes each. The rules dictated that all teams nominated a driver to qualify their cars. The competitors' fastest lap times determined the starting order. IMSA then arranged the grid to put GTP cars ahead of the GTD cars.

=== Qualifying results ===
Pole positions in each class are indicated in bold and with ‡.

Pos.	Class	No.	Entry	Driver	Time	Gap	Grid
1	**GTP**	**93**	**(United States) Acura Meyer Shank Racing w/ Curb-Agajanian**	**(United Kingdom) Nick Yelloly**	**1:05.762**	—	1‡
2	GTP	60	(United States) Acura Meyer Shank Racing w/ Curb-Agajanian	(United Kingdom) Tom Blomqvist	1:05.908	+0.146	2
3	GTP	25	(United States) BMW M Team RLL	(South Africa) Sheldon van der Linde	1:06.078	+0.316	3
4	GTP	24	(United States) BMW M Team RLL	(Belgium) Dries Vanthoor	1:06.140	+0.378	4
5	GTP	6	(Germany) Porsche Penske Motorsport	(Australia) Matt Campbell	1:06.496	+0.734	5
6	GTP	7	(Germany) Porsche Penske Motorsport	(United Kingdom) Nick Tandy	1:06.626	+0.864	6
7	GTP	31	(United States) Cadillac Whelen	(United Kingdom) Jack Aitken	1:06.835	+1.073	7
8	GTP	10	(United States) Cadillac Wayne Taylor Racing	(Portugal) Filipe Albuquerque	1:06.916	+1.154	8
9	GTP	40	(United States) Cadillac Wayne Taylor Racing	(Switzerland) Louis Delétraz	1:07.553	+1.791	9
10	GTP	85	(United States) JDC–Miller MotorSports	(Italy) Gianmaria Bruni	1:07.682	+1.920	10
11	GTP	23	(United States) Aston Martin THOR Team	(Canada) Roman De Angelis	1:07.907	+2.145	11
12	**GTD Pro**	**64**	**(Canada) Ford Multimatic Motorsports**	**(United Kingdom) Sebastian Priaulx**	**1:10.922**	**+5.160**	12‡
13	GTD Pro	65	(Canada) Ford Multimatic Motorsports	(Germany) Christopher Mies	1:11.251	+5.489	13
14	GTD Pro	1	(United States) Paul Miller Racing	(United States) Neil Verhagen	1:11.480	+5.718	14
15	GTD Pro	48	(United States) Paul Miller Racing	(United Kingdom) Dan Harper	1:11.884	+6.122	15
16	GTD Pro	4	(United States) Corvette Racing by Pratt Miller Motorsports	(United States) Tommy Milner	1:11.901	+6.139	16
17	GTD Pro	9	(Canada) Pfaff Motorsports	(Italy) Andrea Caldarelli	1:12.296	+6.534	17
18	GTD Pro	77	(United States) AO Racing	(Austria) Klaus Bachler	1:13.346	+7.584	18
19	GTD Pro	3	(United States) Corvette Racing by Pratt Miller Motorsports	(Spain) Antonio García	1:13.560	+7.798	19
20	GTD Pro	15	(United States) Vasser Sullivan Racing	(United States) Frankie Montecalvo	1:14.125	+8.363	20
21	GTD Pro	81	(United States) DragonSpeed	(Sweden) Rasmus Lindh	1:17.755	+11.993	21
22	GTD Pro	14	(United States) Vasser Sullivan Racing	(United Kingdom) Jack Hawksworth	No time set (Note: The No. 14 Vasser Sullivan Racing Lexus had all its lap times disallowed due to failing post-qualifying technical inspection, with ground clearance below the minimum permitted by IMSA regulations.)		22

== Race ==
=== Post-race ===
The final results kept Nasr and Tandy atop GTP Drivers' Championship with 1795 points, 70 ahead of third-place finishers Campbell and Jaminet. The final results of GTD Pro meant Bachler and Heinrich continued to take the lead of the GTD Pro Drivers' Championship, but their advantage was reduced to 11 points by second-place finishers García and Sims. Priaulx and Rockenfeller advanced from seventh to third. Porsche Penske Motorsport and AO Racing continued to top their respective Teams' Championships. Porsche continued to top the GTP Manufacturers' Championship while Ford took took the lead of the GTD Pro Manufacturers' Championship with 6 rounds remaining in the season.

Class winners are in bold and ‡.

Pos	Class	No	Team	Drivers	Chassis	Laps	Time/Retired
Pos	Class	No	Team	Drivers	Engine	Laps	Time/Retired
1	**GTP**	**93**	**(United States) Acura Meyer Shank Racing w/ Curb-Agajanian**	**(United Kingdom) Nick Yelloly (Netherlands) Renger van der Zande**	**Acura ARX-06**	**84**	**1:40:46.658‡**
1	**GTP**	**93**	**(United States) Acura Meyer Shank Racing w/ Curb-Agajanian**	**(United Kingdom) Nick Yelloly (Netherlands) Renger van der Zande**	**Acura AR24e 2.4 L turbo V6**	**84**	**1:40:46.658‡**
2	GTP	10	(United States) Cadillac Wayne Taylor Racing	(Portugal) Filipe Albuquerque (United States) Ricky Taylor	Cadillac V-Series.R	84	+0.947
2	GTP	10	(United States) Cadillac Wayne Taylor Racing	(Portugal) Filipe Albuquerque (United States) Ricky Taylor	Cadillac LMC55R 5.5 L V8	84	+0.947
3	GTP	6	(Germany) Porsche Penske Motorsport	(Australia) Matt Campbell (France) Mathieu Jaminet	Porsche 963	84	+3.436
3	GTP	6	(Germany) Porsche Penske Motorsport	(Australia) Matt Campbell (France) Mathieu Jaminet	Porsche 9RD 4.6 L turbo V8	84	+3.436
4	GTP	7	(Germany) Porsche Penske Motorsport	(Brazil) Felipe Nasr (United Kingdom) Nick Tandy	Porsche 963	84	+4.117
4	GTP	7	(Germany) Porsche Penske Motorsport	(Brazil) Felipe Nasr (United Kingdom) Nick Tandy	Porsche 9RD 4.6 L turbo V8	84	+4.117
5	GTP	24	(United States) BMW M Team RLL	(Austria) Philipp Eng (Belgium) Dries Vanthoor	BMW M Hybrid V8	84	+7.075
5	GTP	24	(United States) BMW M Team RLL	(Austria) Philipp Eng (Belgium) Dries Vanthoor	BMW P66/3 4.0 L turbo V8	84	+7.075
6	GTP	60	(United States) Acura Meyer Shank Racing w/ Curb-Agajanian	(United Kingdom) Tom Blomqvist (United States) Colin Braun	Acura ARX-06	84	+10.032
6	GTP	60	(United States) Acura Meyer Shank Racing w/ Curb-Agajanian	(United Kingdom) Tom Blomqvist (United States) Colin Braun	Acura AR24e 2.4 L turbo V6	84	+10.032
7	GTP	25	(United States) BMW M Team RLL	(South Africa) Sheldon van der Linde (Germany) Marco Wittmann	BMW M Hybrid V8	84	+26.285 (Note: The No. 4 Corvette Racing by Pratt Miller Motorsports Chevrolet, No. 25 BMW M Team RLL BMW, and No. 77 AO Racing Porsche received a 17-second time penalty post-race each for an unserved drive-through penalty.)
7	GTP	25	(United States) BMW M Team RLL	(South Africa) Sheldon van der Linde (Germany) Marco Wittmann	BMW P66/3 4.0 L turbo V8	84	+26.285
8	GTP	23	(United States) Aston Martin THOR Team	(Canada) Roman De Angelis (United Kingdom) Ross Gunn	Aston Martin Valkyrie	84	+29.661
8	GTP	23	(United States) Aston Martin THOR Team	(Canada) Roman De Angelis (United Kingdom) Ross Gunn	Aston Martin RA 6.5 L V12	84	+29.661
9	GTP	40	(United States) Cadillac Wayne Taylor Racing	(Switzerland) Louis Delétraz (United States) Jordan Taylor	Cadillac V-Series.R	84	+49.610
9	GTP	40	(United States) Cadillac Wayne Taylor Racing	(Switzerland) Louis Delétraz (United States) Jordan Taylor	Cadillac LMC55R 5.5 L V8	84	+49.610
10	GTP	31	(United States) Cadillac Whelen	(United Kingdom) Jack Aitken (New Zealand) Earl Bamber	Cadillac V-Series.R	83	+1 Lap
10	GTP	31	(United States) Cadillac Whelen	(United Kingdom) Jack Aitken (New Zealand) Earl Bamber	Cadillac LMC55R 5.5 L V8	83	+1 Lap
11	GTP	85	(United States) JDC–Miller MotorSports	(Italy) Gianmaria Bruni (Netherlands) Tijmen van der Helm	Porsche 963	83	+1 Lap
11	GTP	85	(United States) JDC–Miller MotorSports	(Italy) Gianmaria Bruni (Netherlands) Tijmen van der Helm	Porsche 9RD 4.6 L turbo V8	83	+1 Lap
12	**GTD Pro**	**64**	**(Canada) Ford Multimatic Motorsports**	**(United Kingdom) Sebastian Priaulx (Germany) Mike Rockenfeller**	**Ford Mustang GT3**	**81**	**+3 Laps‡**
12	**GTD Pro**	**64**	**(Canada) Ford Multimatic Motorsports**	**(United Kingdom) Sebastian Priaulx (Germany) Mike Rockenfeller**	**Ford Coyote 5.4 L V8**	**81**	**+3 Laps‡**
13	GTD Pro	3	(United States) Corvette Racing by Pratt Miller Motorsports	(Spain) Antonio García (United Kingdom) Alexander Sims	Chevrolet Corvette Z06 GT3.R	81	+3 Laps
13	GTD Pro	3	(United States) Corvette Racing by Pratt Miller Motorsports	(Spain) Antonio García (United Kingdom) Alexander Sims	Chevrolet LT6 5.5 L V8	81	+3 Laps
14	GTD Pro	9	(Canada) Pfaff Motorsports	(Italy) Andrea Caldarelli (Italy) Marco Mapelli	Lamborghini Huracán GT3 Evo 2	81	+3 Laps
14	GTD Pro	9	(Canada) Pfaff Motorsports	(Italy) Andrea Caldarelli (Italy) Marco Mapelli	Lamborghini DGF 5.2 L V10	81	+3 Laps
15	GTD Pro	14	(United States) Vasser Sullivan Racing	(United Kingdom) Jack Hawksworth (United States) Aaron Telitz	Lexus RC F GT3	81	+3 Laps
15	GTD Pro	14	(United States) Vasser Sullivan Racing	(United Kingdom) Jack Hawksworth (United States) Aaron Telitz	Toyota 2UR-GSE 5.0 L V8	81	+3 Laps
16	GTD Pro	77	(United States) AO Racing	(Austria) Klaus Bachler (Germany) Laurin Heinrich	Porsche 911 GT3 R (992)	81	+3 Laps
16	GTD Pro	77	(United States) AO Racing	(Austria) Klaus Bachler (Germany) Laurin Heinrich	Porsche M97/80 4.2 L Flat-6	81	+3 Laps
17	GTD Pro	4	(United States) Corvette Racing by Pratt Miller Motorsports	(Netherlands) Nicky Catsburg (United States) Tommy Milner	Chevrolet Corvette Z06 GT3.R	81	+3 Laps
17	GTD Pro	4	(United States) Corvette Racing by Pratt Miller Motorsports	(Netherlands) Nicky Catsburg (United States) Tommy Milner	Chevrolet LT6 5.5 L V8	81	+3 Laps
18	GTD Pro	48	(United States) Paul Miller Racing	(United Kingdom) Dan Harper (Germany) Max Hesse	BMW M4 GT3 Evo	80	+4 Laps
18	GTD Pro	48	(United States) Paul Miller Racing	(United Kingdom) Dan Harper (Germany) Max Hesse	BMW P58 3.0 L Turbo I6	80	+4 Laps
19	GTD Pro	81	(United States) DragonSpeed	(Spain) Albert Costa (Sweden) Rasmus Lindh	Ferrari 296 GT3	80	+4 Laps
19	GTD Pro	81	(United States) DragonSpeed	(Spain) Albert Costa (Sweden) Rasmus Lindh	Ferrari F163CE 3.0 L Turbo V6	80	+4 Laps
20	GTD Pro	15	(United States) Vasser Sullivan Racing	(United States) Frankie Montecalvo (Canada) Parker Thompson	Lexus RC F GT3	80	+4 Laps
20	GTD Pro	15	(United States) Vasser Sullivan Racing	(United States) Frankie Montecalvo (Canada) Parker Thompson	Toyota 2UR-GSE 5.0 L V8	80	+4 Laps
21 DNF	GTD Pro	65	(Canada) Ford Multimatic Motorsports	(Germany) Christopher Mies (Belgium) Frédéric Vervisch	Ford Mustang GT3	78	Collision
21 DNF	GTD Pro	65	(Canada) Ford Multimatic Motorsports	(Germany) Christopher Mies (Belgium) Frédéric Vervisch	Ford Coyote 5.4 L V8	78	Collision
22	GTD Pro	1	(United States) Paul Miller Racing	(United States) Madison Snow (United States) Neil Verhagen	BMW M4 GT3 Evo	75	+9 Laps
22	GTD Pro	1	(United States) Paul Miller Racing	(United States) Madison Snow (United States) Neil Verhagen	BMW P58 3.0 L Turbo I6	75	+9 Laps

== Standings after the race ==
GTP Drivers' Championship standings
Pos.	+/–	Driver	Points
1		(Brazil) Felipe Nasr (United Kingdom) Nick Tandy	1795
2		(France) Mathieu Jaminet (Australia) Matt Campbell	1725
3		(Austria) Philipp Eng (Belgium) Dries Vanthoor	1498
4	2	(United Kingdom) Nick Yelloly (Netherlands) Renger van der Zande	1481
5	2	(Portugal) Filipe Albuquerque (United States) Ricky Taylor	1421

LMP2 Drivers' Championship standings
Pos.	+/–	Driver	Points
1		(Brazil) Felipe Fraga (United States) Gar Robinson (Australia) Josh Burdon	645
2		(United States) Dan Goldburg (United Kingdom) Paul di Resta (Sweden) Rasmus Lindh	643
3		(United States) Bijoy Garg (France) Tom Dillmann	602
4		(United States) Steven Thomas (New Zealand) Hunter McElrea (Denmark) Mikkel Jensen	591
5		(Denmark) Benjamin Pedersen (Switzerland) Mathias Beche (United States) Rodrigo Sales	576

GTD Pro Drivers' Championship standings
Pos.	+/–	Driver	Points
1		(Austria) Klaus Bachler (Germany) Laurin Heinrich	1298
2		(Spain) Antonio García (United Kingdom) Alexander Sims	1287
3	4	(United Kingdom) Sebastian Priaulx (Germany) Mike Rockenfeller	1243
4	1	(Spain) Albert Costa	1190
5	1	(Germany) Christopher Mies (Belgium) Frédéric Vervisch	1149

GTD Drivers' Championship standings
Pos.	+/–	Driver	Points
1		(Switzerland) Philip Ellis (United States) Russell Ward	1372
2		(United Kingdom) Jack Hawksworth (Canada) Parker Thompson	1248
3		(United States) Adam Adelson (United States) Elliott Skeer	1166
4		(United Kingdom) Casper Stevenson	1105
5		(United States) Robby Foley (United States) Patrick Gallagher	1078

Note: Only the top five positions are included for all sets of standings.

GTP Teams' Championship standings
Pos.	+/–	Team	Points
1		(Germany) #7 Porsche Penske Motorsport	1795
2		(Germany) #6 Porsche Penske Motorsport	1725
3		(United States) #24 BMW M Team RLL	1498
4	2	(United States) #93 Acura Meyer Shank Racing w/ Curb-Agajanian	1481
5	2	(United States) #10 Cadillac Wayne Taylor Racing	1421

LMP2 Teams' Championship standings
Pos.	+/–	Team	Points
1		(United States) #74 Riley	645
2		(United States) #22 United Autosports USA	643
3		(Poland) #43Inter Europol Competition	602
4		(France) #11 TDS Racing	591
5		(United States) #52 PR1/Mathiasen Motorsports	576

GTD Pro Teams' Championship standings
Pos.	+/–	Team	Points
1		(United States) #77 AO Racing	1298
2		(United States) #3 Corvette Racing by Pratt Miller Motorsports	1287
3	4	(Canada) #64 Ford Multimatic Motorsports	1243
4	1	(United States) #81 DragonSpeed	1190
5	1	(Canada) #65 Ford Multimatic Motorsports	1149

GTD Teams' Championship standings
Pos.	+/–	Team	Points
1		(United States) #57 Winward Racing	1372
2		(United States) #12 Vasser Sullivan Racing	1248
3		(United States) #120 Wright Motorsports	1166
4		(United States) #27 Heart of Racing Team	1105
5		(United States) #96 Turner Motorsport	1078

Note: Only the top five positions are included for all sets of standings.

GTP Manufacturers' Championship standings
Pos.	+/–	Manufacturer	Points
1		(Germany) Porsche	1854
2	1	(Japan) Acura	1707
3	1	(Germany) BMW	1672
4		(United States) Cadillac	1622
5		(United Kingdom) Aston Martin	1163

GTD Pro Manufacturers' Championship standings
Pos.	+/–	Manufacturer	Points
1	4	(United States) Ford	1339
2	1	(Germany) Porsche	1322
3	1	(United States) Chevrolet	1318
4	2	(Germany) BMW	1256
5	2	(Italy) Ferrari	1237

GTD Manufacturers' Championship standings
Pos.	+/–	Manufacturer	Points
1		(Germany) Mercedes-AMG	1404
2		(Japan) Lexus	1309
3		(Germany) Porsche	1305
4		(Italy) Ferrari	1208
5		(United Kingdom) Aston Martin	1186

Note: Only the top five positions are included for all sets of standings.

IMSA SportsCar Championship
Previous race: Monterey SportsCar Championship	2025 season	Next race: Sahlen's Six Hours of The Glen
