= 2025 GT America Series =

Racing Series

The 2025 GT America Series was the fifth season of the SRO Motorsports Group's GT America Series, an auto racing series for grand tourer cars. The races were contested with GT2-spec, GT3-spec and GT4-spec cars. The season began on March 28 at Sonoma Raceway and finished on October 19 at Indianapolis.

== Calendar ==
The initial calendar was revealed during the 2024 24 Hours of Spa featuring eight rounds.

Round	Circuit	Date	Supporting
1	Sonoma Raceway, Sonoma, California	March 28–30	GT World Challenge America
2	Long Beach Street Circuit, Long Beach, California	April 11–13	IndyCar Series; IMSA SportsCar Championship
3	Circuit of the Americas, Austin, Texas	April 25–27	GT World Challenge America
4	Sebring International Raceway, Sebring, Florida	May 16–18	GT World Challenge America
5	Virginia International Raceway, Alton, Virginia	July 18–20	GT World Challenge America
6	Road America, Elkhart Lake, Wisconsin	August 15–17	GT World Challenge America
7	Barber Motorsports Park, Birmingham, Alabama	September 5–7	GT World Challenge America
8	Indianapolis Motor Speedway, Indianapolis, Indiana	October 16–19	Intercontinental GT Challenge; GT World Challenge America

== Entry list ==
Team	Car	No.	Drivers	Class		Rounds
Team	Car	No.	Drivers	Car	Driver	Rounds
(United States) HP TECH Motorsport	Ferrari 296 GT3	004	(United States) Tony Davis	GT3	GT	7–8
(United States) ProSport Competition	Aston Martin Vantage GT4	007	(United States) Tim Savage	GT4	GT	1
(United States) Archangel Motorsports with Pro-Sport Competition	Aston Martin Vantage GT4	007	(United States) Mike Johnson	GT4	GT	8
(United States) Crowdstrike Racing by Riley Motorsports	Mercedes-AMG GT3 Evo	04	(United States) George Kurtz	GT3	GT	1–2, 8
(United States) 89x Motorsports	Aston Martin Vantage GT4	09	(United States) John Dean	GT4	GT	5
(United States) 89x Motorsports	Aston Martin Vantage GT4	89	(United States) Michael Fitzpatrick	GT4	GT	4–5
(Germany) Rotek Racing	Porsche 718 Cayman GT4 RS Clubsport	099	(United States) Robb Holland	GT4	GT	2
(United States) Racers Edge Motorsports	Aston Martin Vantage AMR GT3 Evo	2	(United States) Jason Bell	GT3	GT	2, 5–8
(United States) ACI Motorsports	Porsche 718 Cayman GT4 RS Clubsport	7	(United States) Curt Swearingin	GT4	GT	1
(United States) ACI Motorsports	Porsche 718 Cayman GT4 RS Clubsport	7	(United States) Ricco Shlaimoun	GT4	GT	2
(United States) DXDT Racing	Chevrolet Corvette Z06 GT3.R	11	(United States) Blake McDonald	GT3	GT	2–8
(Canada) R. Ferri Motorsport	Ferrari 296 GT3	13	(Canada) Marc Muzzo	GT3	GT	1, 3
(United States) GMG Racing	Audi R8 LMS Evo II	14	(United States) James Sofronas	GT3	GT	2
(United States) GMG Racing	Porsche 911 GT3 R (992)	32	(United States) Kyle Washington	GT3	GT	All
(United States) GMG Racing	Porsche 911 GT3 R (991.2)	54	(United States) Patrick Mulcahy	GT3	GT	2
(United States) GMG Racing	Audi R8 LMS GT2	58	(United States) CJ Moses	GT2	GT	2, 5, 8
(Italy) AF Corse USA	Ferrari 296 GT3	16	(United States) Rodin Younessi	GT3	GT	8
(Mexico) Esses Racing	Porsche 911 GT3 R (992)	19	(Mexico) Joel Cortes	GT3	GT	3
(United States) RS1	Porsche 911 GT3 R (992)	19	(Mexico) Joel Cortes	GT3	GT	7–8
(United States) FASTMD Racing with Remstar	Audi R8 GT4 LMS	20	(United States) Farhan Siddiqi	GT4	INV	4
(United States) FASTMD Racing with Remstar	Audi R8 LMS GT3	20	(United States) Farhan Siddiqi	GT3	GT	6–7
(United States) FASTMD Racing with Remstar	Audi R8 LMS GT3	95	(United States) Farhan Siddiqi	GT3	GT	3
(United States) Heart of Racing Team	Aston Martin Vantage AMR GT3 Evo	24	(United States) Gray Newell	GT3	GT	2
(United States) Turner Motorsport	BMW M4 GT3 Evo	29	(United States) Justin Rothberg	GT3	GT	All
(United States) Van der Steur Racing	Aston Martin Vantage GT4 Evo	39	(United States) Max Hewitt	GT4	GT	1, 3
(United States) NOLASport	Porsche 718 Cayman GT4 RS Clubsport	47	(United States) Matt Travis	GT4	GT	1
(United States) NOLASport	Porsche 718 Cayman GT4 RS Clubsport	47	(United States) Michael Auriemma	GT4	GT	3
(United States) Chouest Povoledo Racing	Chevrolet Corvette Z06 GT3.R	50	(United States) Ross Chouest	GT3	GT	All
(United States) SKI Autosports	Audi R8 LMS Evo II	56	(Mexico) Memo Gidley	GT3	GT	3–8
(United States) Flying Lizard Motorsports	Lamborghini Huracan Super Trofeo	62	(United States) Evan King	GT2	GT	8
(United States) Flying Lizard Motorsports	BMW M4 GT3 Evo	80	(United States) Elias Sabo	GT3	GT	1–3
(United States) Flying Lizard Motorsports	BMW M4 GT4 (G82)	610	(United States) Craig Lumsden	GT4	GT	8
(United States) JTR Motorsports Engineering	Toyota GR Supra GT4 Evo2	69	(United States) Anthony McIntosh	GT4	GT	1, 3–5
(Germany) Mishumotors	Corvette C7 GT3-R	70	(Germany) Mirco Schultis	GT3	GT	1–4, 8
(Australia) 75 Express	Mercedes-AMG GT3 Evo	75	(Australia) Kenny Habul	GT3	GT	8
(United States) RCX Motorsport	Porsche 718 Cayman GT4 RS Clubsport	83	(Hungary) Jozsef Petkes	GT4	GT	8
(United States) Regulator Racing	Mercedes-AMG GT3 Evo	91	(United States) Jeff Burton	GT3	GT	2, 8
(United States) Random Vandals Racing	BMW M4 GT4 Evo (G82)	98	(United States) Paul Sparta	GT4	GT	2
(United States) Paradaime Performance Engineering	Porsche 718 Cayman GT4 RS Clubsport	140	(United States) Mark Crigler	GT4	GT	1
(United States) MLT Motorsports	Lamborghini Huracan Super Trofeo Evo2 GT2	142	(United Kingdom) Adrian Kunzle	GT2	GT	2
(United States) Fast Track Racing	BMW M4 GT4 Evo (G82)	188	(United States) Denny Stripling	GT4	GT	1
(United States) Fast Track Racing	BMW M4 GT4 (G82)	188	(United States) Judson Holt	GT4	GT	2
(United States) Wright Motorsports	Porsche 911 GT3 R (992)	216	(Canada) Jon Manship	GT3	GT	3

Icon	Class
Car
GT2	GT2 Cars
GT3	GT3 Current-Gen Cars
GT3	GT3 Previous-Gen Cars
GT4	GT4 Cars
Drivers
GT	SRO3
GT	GT2
GT	GT4
INV	Invitational

== Race results ==
Bold indicates overall winner

Round		Circuit	Pole position	SRO3 Winners	GT2 Winners	GT4 Winners	Results
1	R1	(California) Sonoma	(United States) #04 Crowdstrike Racing by Riley Motorsports	(United States) #04 Crowdstrike Racing by Riley Motorsports	No Entries	(United States) #69 JTR Motorsports Engineering	Report
1	R1	(California) Sonoma	(United States) George Kurtz	(United States) George Kurtz	No Entries	(United States) Anthony McIntosh	Report
1	R2	(California) Sonoma	(United States) #04 Crowdstrike Racing by Riley Motorsports	(United States) #32 GMG Racing	No Entries	(United States) #39 Van der Steur Racing	Report
1	R2	(California) Sonoma	(United States) George Kurtz	(United States) Kyle Washington	No Entries	(United States) Max Hewitt	Report
2	R1	(California) Long Beach	(United States) #24 Heart of Racing Team	(United States) #29 Turner Motorsport	(United States) #142 MLT Motorsports	(United States) #188 Fast Track Racing	Report
2	R1	(California) Long Beach	(United States) Gray Newell	(United States) Justin Rothberg	(United Kingdom) Adrian Kunzle	(United States) Judson Holt	Report
2	R2	(California) Long Beach	(United States) #11 DXDT Racing	(United States) #29 Turner Motorsport	(United States) #142 MLT Motorsports	(United States) #188 Fast Track Racing	Report
2	R2	(California) Long Beach	(United States) Blake McDonald	(United States) Justin Rothberg	(United Kingdom) Adrian Kunzle	(United States) Judson Holt	Report
3	R1	(Texas) COTA	(United States) #32 GMG Racing	(United States) #32 GMG Racing	No Entries	(United States) #69 JTR Motorsports Engineering	Report
3	R1	(Texas) COTA	(United States) Kyle Washington	(United States) Kyle Washington	No Entries	(United States) Anthony McIntosh	Report
3	R2	(Texas) COTA	(United States) #29 Turner Motorsport	(United States) #29 Turner Motorsport	No Entries	(United States) #39 Van der Steur Racing	Report
3	R2	(Texas) COTA	(United States) Justin Rothberg	(United States) Justin Rothberg	No Entries	(United States) Max Hewitt	Report
4	R1	(Florida) Sebring	(United States) #11 DXDT Racing	(United States) #56 SKI Autosports	No Entries	(United States) #69 JTR Motorsports Engineering	Report
4	R1	(Florida) Sebring	(United States) Blake McDonald	(Mexico) Memo Gidley	No Entries	(United States) Anthony McIntosh	Report
4	R2	(Florida) Sebring	(United States) #32 GMG Racing	(United States) #32 GMG Racing	No Entries	(United States) #69 JTR Motorsports Engineering	Report
4	R2	(Florida) Sebring	(United States) Kyle Washington	(United States) Kyle Washington	No Entries	(United States) Anthony McIntosh	Report
5	R1	Virginia	(United States) #29 Turner Motorsport	(United States) #29 Turner Motorsport	(United States) #58 GMG Racing	(United States) #89 89x Motorsports	Report
5	R1	Virginia	(United States) Justin Rothberg	(United States) Justin Rothberg	(United States) CJ Moses	(United States) Michael Fitzpatrick	Report
5	R2	Virginia	(United States) #29 Turner Motorsport	(United States) #29 Turner Motorsport	(United States) #58 GMG Racing	(United States) #89 89x Motorsports	Report
5	R2	Virginia	(United States) Justin Rothberg	(United States) Justin Rothberg	(United States) CJ Moses	(United States) Michael Fitzpatrick	Report
6	R1	(Wisconsin) Road America	(United States) #11 DXDT Racing	(United States) #56 SKI Autosports	No Entries		Report
6	R1	(Wisconsin) Road America	(United States) Blake McDonald	(Mexico) Memo Gidley	No Entries		Report
6	R2	(Wisconsin) Road America	(United States) #56 SKI Autosports	(United States) #50 Chouest Povoledo Racing	No Entries		Report
6	R2	(Wisconsin) Road America	(Mexico) Memo Gidley	(United States) Ross Chouest	No Entries		Report
7	R1	(Alabama) Barber	(United States) #56 SKI Autosports	(United States) #50 Chouest Povoledo Racing	No Entries		Report
7	R1	(Alabama) Barber	(Mexico) Memo Gidley	(United States) Ross Chouest	No Entries		Report
7	R2	(Alabama) Barber	(United States) #56 SKI Autosports	(United States) #29 Turner Motorsport	No Entries		Report
7	R2	(Alabama) Barber	(Mexico) Memo Gidley	(United States) Justin Rothberg	No Entries		Report
8	R1	(Indiana) Indianapolis	(United States) #04 Crowdstrike Racing by Riley Motorsports	(United States) #56 SKI Autosports	(United States) #58 GMG Racing	(United States) #007 Archangel Motorsports with Pro-Sport Competition	Report
8	R1	(Indiana) Indianapolis	(United States) George Kurtz	(Mexico) Memo Gidley	(United States) CJ Moses	(United States) Mike Johnson	Report
8	R2	(Indiana) Indianapolis	(United States) #2 Racers Edge Motorsports	(United States) #50 Chouest Povoledo Racing	No Starters	(United States) #83 RCX Motorsport	Report
8	R2	(Indiana) Indianapolis	(United States) Jason Bell	(United States) Ross Chouest	No Starters	(Hungary) Jozsef Petkes	Report

== Championship Standings ==
Scoring System

Championship points are awarded for the first ten positions in each race. Entries are required to complete 75% of the winning car's race distance in order to be classified and earn points.

Position	**1st**	**2nd**	**3rd**	**4th**	**5th**	**6th**	**7th**	**8th**	**9th**	**10th**
Points	25	18	15	12	10	8	6	4	2	1

=== Drivers' Championships ===
Pos.	Driver	Team	1		2		3		4		5		6		7		8		Points
Pos.	Driver	Team	(California) SON		(California) LBH		(Texas) COTA		(Florida) SEB		(Virginia) VIR		(Wisconsin) ELK		(Alabama) BAR		(Indiana) IND		Points
Pos.	Driver	Team	R1	R2	R1	R2	R1	R2	R1	R2	R1	R2	R1	R2	R1	R2	R1	R2	Points
SRO3
1	(United States) Justin Rothberg	(United States) Turner Motorsport	5	2	1	1	2	**1**	2	3	**1**	**1**	5	3	4	1	4	DNS	278
2	(United States) Kyle Washington	(United States) GMG Racing	6	1	2	2	**1**	2	3	1	4	3	3	5	3	5	6	EX	237
3	(Mexico) Memo Gidley	(United States) SKI Autosports					3	4	1	**2**	2	2	1	**2**	**2**	**2**	1	4	222
4	(United States) Ross Chouest	(United States) Chouest Povoledo Racing	7	6	5	5	4	3	5	5	3	4	2	1	1	6	5	1	219
5	(Germany) Mirco Schultis	(Germany) Mishumotors	3	3	6				4	4							7	2	86
6	(United States) George Kurtz	(United States) Crowdstrike Racing by Riley Motorsports	**1**	**5**	4	4											**2**		77
7	(United States) Jason Bell	(United States) Racers Edge Motorsports			DNS						5	5	6	DNS	7	DNS	3	**5**	59
8	(Mexico) Joel Cortes	(Mexico) Esses Racing					6	6							6	3		3	54
9	(United States) Elias Sabo	(United States) Flying Lizard Motorsports	2	4	9	3	7												53
10	(United States) Farhan Siddiqi	(United States) FASTMD Racing with Remstar											4	4	5	4			46
11	(Canada) Marc Muzzo	(Canada) R. Ferri Motorsport	4	DNS			5	5											32
12	(United States) Gray Newell	(United States) Heart of Racing Team			**3**	9													17
13	(United States) Blake McDonald	(United States) DXDT Racing			7	**7**			**DNS**				**DNS**	DNS					12
14	(Canada) Jon Manship	(United States) Wright Motorsports																	10
15	(United States) James Sofronas	(United States) GMG Racing			10	6													9
16	(United States) Jeff Burton	(United States) Regulator Racing			8	10													5
17	(United States) Patrick Mulcahy	(United States) GMG Racing			DNS	8													4
18	(Canada) Jean-Frédéric Laberge	(Canada) LAB Motorsport by GT Racing					DNS												0
GT2
1	(United States) CJ Moses	(United States) GMG Racing			DNS	2					**1**	**1**					**1**		93
2	(United Kingdom) Adrian Kunzle	(United States) MLT Motorsports			**1**	**1**													50
GT4
1	(United States) Anthony McIntosh	(United States) JTR Motorsports Engineering	**1**	**2**			1	2	**1**	1									136
2	(United States) Max Hewitt	(United States) Van der Steur Racing	2	1			**2**	**1**											86
3	(United States) Michael Fitzpatrick	(United States) 89x Motorsports							2	**2**	**1**	**1**							86
4	(United States) Judson Holt	(United States) Fast Track Racing			1	1													50
5	(United States) Denny Stripling	(United States) Fast Track Racing	5	6			3	3											48
6	(United States) John Dean	(United States) 89x Motorsports									2	2							36
6	(United States) Paul Sparta	(United States) Random Vandals Racing			**2**	**3**													33
7	(United States) Ricco Shlaimoun	(United States) ACI Motorsports			3	2													33
8	(United States) Matt Travis	(United States) NOLASport	3	3															30
9	(United States) Tim Savage	(United States) ProSport Competition	7	4															18
10	(United States) Mark Crigler	(United States) Paradaime Performance Engineering	6	5															18
11	(United States) Curt Swearingin	(United States) ACI Motorsports	4	7															18
12	(United States) Michael Auriemma	(United States) NOLASport					DNS	DNS											0
Pos.	Driver	Team	(California) SON		(California) LBH		(Texas) COTA		(Florida) SEB		(Virginia) VIR		(Wisconsin) ELK		(Alabama) BAR		(Indiana) IND		Points

Key
Colour	Result
Gold	Race winner
Silver	2nd place
Bronze	3rd place
Green	Points finish
Blue	Non-points finish
Blue	Non-classified finish (NC)
Purple	Did not finish (Ret)
Black	Disqualified (DSQ)
Black	Excluded (EX)
White	Did not start (DNS)
White	Race cancelled (C)
White	Withdrew (WD)
Blank	Did not participate

**Bold** – Pole
Italics – Fastest Lap

Notes

- † – Drivers did not finish the race but were classified, as they completed more than 75% of the race distance.
- ‡ – Post-event penalty. Car moved to back of class.
