= 2024 GT America Series =

Racing Series

The 2024 GT America Series was the fourth season of the SRO Motorsports Group's GT America Series, an auto racing series for grand tourer cars. The races were contested with GT2-spec, GT3-spec and GT4-spec cars. The season began on April 5 at Sonoma Raceway and ended on October 6 at Indianapolis.

== Calendar ==
The initial calendar was revealed during the 2023 24 Hours of Spa featuring eight rounds.

Round	Circuit	Date	Supporting
1	Sonoma Raceway, Sonoma, California	April 5–7	GT World Challenge America
2	Long Beach Street Circuit, Long Beach, California	April 19–21	IndyCar Series; IMSA SportsCar Championship
3	Sebring International Raceway, Sebring, Florida	May 3–5	GT World Challenge America
4	Circuit of the Americas, Austin, Texas	May 17–19	GT World Challenge America
5	Virginia International Raceway, Alton, Virginia	July 19–21	GT World Challenge America
6	Road America, Elkhart Lake, Wisconsin	August 16–18	GT World Challenge America
7	Barber Motorsports Park, Birmingham, Alabama	September 6–8	GT World Challenge America
8	Indianapolis Motor Speedway, Indianapolis, Indiana	October 4–6	Intercontinental GT Challenge; GT World Challenge America

== Entry list ==
Team	Car	No.	Drivers	Class		Rounds
Team	Car	No.	Drivers	Car	Driver	Rounds
(United States) Crowdstrike Racing by Riley Motorsports	Mercedes-AMG GT3 Evo	04	(United States) George Kurtz	GT3	OV	1–4
(United States) Flying Lizard Motorsports	Nissan Z Nismo GT4	05	(Canada) Damir Hot	GT4	GT	5, 8
(United States) Flying Lizard Motorsports	Nissan Z Nismo GT4	5	(Canada) Damir Hot	GT4	GT	4
(United States) Flying Lizard Motorsports	Aston Martin Vantage AMR GT3 Evo	2	(United States) Jason Bell	GT3	OV	All
(United States) Flying Lizard Motorsports	Aston Martin Vantage AMR GT3 Evo	48	(United States) Elias Sabo	GT3	OV	5
(United States) Flying Lizard Motorsports	BMW M4 GT3	8	(United States) Elias Sabo	GT3	OV	6–7
(United States) Flying Lizard Motorsports	Aston Martin Vantage AMR GT4	8	(United States) Elias Sabo	GT4	GT	2
(United States) Flying Lizard Motorsports	Aston Martin Vantage AMR GT4	13	(United States) Todd Parriott	GT4	GT	1–3
(United States) Flying Lizard Motorsports	Aston Martin Vantage AMR GT4	31	(United States) Todd Parriott	GT4	GT	4–7
(United States) ProSport Competition	Aston Martin Vantage AMR GT3	007	(United States) Tim Savage	GT3	OV	1, 3–7
(United States) ProSport Competition	Aston Martin Vantage AMR GT4	007	(United States) Tim Savage	GT4	GT	8
(United States) DXDT Racing	Mercedes-AMG GT3 Evo	08	(United States) Scott Smithson	GT3	OV	1
(United States) DXDT Racing	Chevrolet Corvette Z06 GT3.R	08	(United States) Scott Smithson	GT3	OV	3–5
(United States) DXDT Racing	Chevrolet Corvette Z06 GT3.R	08	(United States) Bryson Morris	GT3	OV	6
(United States) DXDT Racing	Chevrolet Corvette Z06 GT3.R	64	(United States) Bryson Morris	GT3	OV	7
(United States) DXDT Racing	Chevrolet Corvette Z06 GT3.R	64	(United States) Blake McDonald	GT3	OV	8
(United States) Orlando Motorsports Services	McLaren Artura GT4	085	(United States) Alan Teo	GT4	GT	8
(Germany) Rotek Racing	Porsche 718 Cayman GT4 RS Clubsport	098	(United States) Isaac Sherman	GT4	GT	All
(Germany) Rotek Racing	Porsche 718 Cayman GT4 RS Clubsport	099	(United States) Robb Holland	GT4	GT	2
(United States) SKI Autosports	Audi R8 LMS Evo II	3	(United States) Johnny O'Connell	GT3	OV	All
(United States) ACI Motorsports	Porsche 718 Cayman GT4 RS Clubsport	7	(United States) Curt Swearingin	GT4	GT	All
(United States) Lone Star Racing	Mercedes-AMG GT2	10	(United States) Dan Knox	GT2	GT	2, 8
(United States) Lone Star Racing	Mercedes-AMG GT3 Evo	11	(United States) Marc Austin	GT3	OV	4
(United States) GMG Racing	Audi R8 LMS Evo II	14	(United States) James Sofronas	GT3	OV	1–2, 4, 6, 8
(United States) GMG Racing	Porsche 911 GT3 R (991.2)	32	(United States) Kyle Washington	GT3	OV	1–4
(United States) GMG Racing	Porsche 911 GT3 R (992)	32	(United States) Kyle Washington	GT3	OV	5–7
(United States) GMG Racing	Mercedes-AMG GT2	44	(United States) Brent Holden	GT2	GT	1–2
(United States) GMG Racing	Audi R8 LMS GT2	58	(United States) CJ Moses	GT2	GT	2, 8
(United States) Carrus Callas Raceteam	BMW M4 GT4 (G82)	21	(United States) Nicholas Shanny	GT4	GT	All
(United States) Heart of Racing Team	Aston Martin Vantage AMR GT4	25	(United States) Gray Newell	GT4	GT	All
(United States) CRP/Daskalos Racing	Mercedes-AMG GT3 Evo	27	(United States) Jason Daskalos	GT3	OV	All
(United States) Turner Motorsport	BMW M4 GT3	29	(United States) Justin Rothberg	GT3	OV	All
(United States) Fast Track Racing	BMW M4 GT3	30	(United States) John Roberts	GT3	OV	4
(United States) Rigid Speed Company	BMW M4 GT4 Gen II	33	(United States) Joseph Catania	GT4	GT	5
(Canada) STR38 Motorsports	BMW M4 GT4 (G82)	38	(Canada) Samantha Tan	GT4	GT	2
(United States) Dollahite Racing	Audi R8 LMS Evo II	46	(United States) Scott Dollahite	GT3	OV	8
(United States) Chouest Povoledo Racing	Mercedes-AMG GT3 Evo	50	(United States) Ross Chouest	GT3	OV	All
(United States) Archangel Motorsports	Aston Martin Vantage AMR GT4	69	(United States) Todd Coleman	GT4	GT	1–2
(Germany) Mishumotors	Corvette C7 GT3-R	70	(Germany) Mirco Schultis	GT3	OV	1–3, 6, 8
(United States) Regulator Racing	Mercedes-AMG GT3 Evo	91	(United States) Jeff Burton	GT3	OV	6–7
(Canada) Montreal Motorsport Group	Porsche 911 GT3 R (992)	92	(Canada) Jean-Frédéric Laberge	GT3	OV	5
(United States) FastMD Racing with Remstar Racing	Audi R8 LMS GT4 Evo	95	(United States) Farhan Siddiqi	GT4	GT	3–4, 6
(United States) TPC with Dream Racing	McLaren Artura GT4	102	(United States) Alan Grossberg	GT4	GT	6–8
(United States) TPC with Dream Racing	Lamborghini Huracán Super Trofeo Evo2 GT2	102	(United States) Alan Grossberg	GT2	GT	1–4
(United States) TPC with Dream Racing	Lamborghini Huracán Super Trofeo Evo2 GT2	127	(United States) Aaron Farhadi	GT2	GT	1–3

Icon	Class
Car
GT2	GT2 Cars
GT3	GT3 Current-Gen Cars
GT3	GT3 Previous-Gen Cars
GT4	GT4 Cars
Drivers
OV	Overall
GT	GT2
GT	GT4
INV	Invitational

Notes:

- AF Corse and driver Custodio Toledo were originally entered for the season opener at Sonoma, but decided to withdraw from the event.
- CrowdStrike Racing by Riley Motorsports was originally entered for the fifth round at Virginia International Raceway, but was withdrawn following the CrowdStrike global outage.
- GMG Racing originally entered the No. 58 for CJ Moses in the fifth round at VIR, but later withdrew the entry from the event.

== Race results ==
Bold indicates overall winner

Round		Circuit	Pole position	SRO3 Winners	GT2 Winners	GT4 Winners	Results
1	R1	(California) Sonoma	(United States) #27 CRP/Daskalos Racing	(United States) #27 CRP/Daskalos Racing	(United States) #127 TPC with Dream Racing	(United States) #098 Rotek Racing	Report
1	R1	(California) Sonoma	(United States) Jason Daskalos	(United States) Jason Daskalos	(United States) Aaron Farhadi	(United States) Isaac Sherman	Report
1	R2	(California) Sonoma	(United States) #14 GMG Racing	(United States) #3 SKI Autosports	(United States) #127 TPC with Dream Racing	(United States) #098 Rotek Racing	Report
1	R2	(California) Sonoma	(United States) James Sofronas	(United States) Johnny O'Connell	(United States) Aaron Farhadi	(United States) Isaac Sherman	Report
2	R1	(California) Long Beach	(United States) #3 SKI Autosports	(United States) #27 CRP/Daskalos Racing	(United States) #10 Lone Star Racing	(United States) #098 Rotek Racing	Report
2	R1	(California) Long Beach	(United States) Johnny O'Connell	(United States) Jason Daskalos	(United States) Dan Knox	(United States) Isaac Sherman	Report
2	R2	(California) Long Beach	(United States) #27 CRP/Daskalos Racing	(United States) #27 CRP/Daskalos Racing	(United States) #10 Lone Star Racing	(United States) #098 Rotek Racing	Report
2	R2	(California) Long Beach	(United States) Jason Daskalos	(United States) Jason Daskalos	(United States) Dan Knox	(United States) Isaac Sherman	Report
3	R1	(Florida) Sebring	(United States) #04 Crowdstrike Racing by Riley Motorsports	(United States) #04 Crowdstrike Racing by Riley Motorsports	(United States) #102 TPC with Dream Racing	(United States) #098 Rotek Racing	Report
3	R1	(Florida) Sebring	(United States) George Kurtz	(United States) George Kurtz	(United States) Alan Grossberg	(United States) Isaac Sherman	Report
3	R2	(Florida) Sebring	(United States) #04 Crowdstrike Racing by Riley Motorsports	(United States) #04 Crowdstrike Racing by Riley Motorsports	(United States) #102 TPC with Dream Racing	(United States) #098 Rotek Racing	Report
3	R2	(Florida) Sebring	(United States) George Kurtz	(United States) George Kurtz	(United States) Alan Grossberg	(United States) Isaac Sherman	Report
4	R1	(Texas) COTA	(United States) #3 SKI Autosports	(United States) #27 CRP/Daskalos Racing	(United States) #102 TPC with Dream Racing	(United States) #098 Rotek Racing	Report
4	R1	(Texas) COTA	(United States) Johnny O'Connell	(United States) Jason Daskalos	(United States) Alan Grossberg	(United States) Isaac Sherman	Report
4	R2	(Texas) COTA	(United States) #04 Crowdstrike Racing by Riley Motorsports	(United States) #04 Crowdstrike Racing by Riley Motorsports	(United States) #102 TPC with Dream Racing	(United States) #7 ACI Motorsports	Report
4	R2	(Texas) COTA	(United States) George Kurtz	(United States) George Kurtz	(United States) Alan Grossberg	(United States) Curt Swearingin	Report
5	R1	Virginia	(United States) #29 Turner Motorsport	(United States) #29 Turner Motorsport	No Entries	(United States) #7 ACI Motorsports	Report
5	R1	Virginia	(United States) Justin Rothberg	(United States) Justin Rothberg	No Entries	(United States) Curt Swearingin	Report
5	R2	Virginia	(United States) #3 SKI Autosports	(United States) #3 SKI Autosports	No Entries	(Germany) #098 Rotek Racing	Report
5	R2	Virginia	(United States) Johnny O'Connell	(United States) Johnny O'Connell	No Entries	(United States) Isaac Sherman	Report
6	R1	(Wisconsin) Road America	(United States) #29 Turner Motorsport	(United States) #29 Turner Motorsport	No Entries	(United States) #7 ACI Motorsports	Report
6	R1	(Wisconsin) Road America	(United States) Justin Rothberg	(United States) Justin Rothberg	No Entries	(United States) Curt Swearingin	Report
6	R2	(Wisconsin) Road America	(United States) #14 GMG Racing	(United States) #14 GMG Racing	No Entries	(Germany) #098 Rotek Racing	Report
6	R2	(Wisconsin) Road America	(United States) James Sofronas	(United States) James Sofronas	No Entries	(United States) Isaac Sherman	Report
7	R1	(Alabama) Barber	(United States) #29 Turner Motorsport	(United States) #27 CRP/Daskalos Racing	No Entries	(Germany) #098 Rotek Racing	Report
7	R1	(Alabama) Barber	(United States) Justin Rothberg	(United States) Jason Daskalos	No Entries	(United States) Isaac Sherman	Report
7	R2	(Alabama) Barber	(United States) #27 CRP/Daskalos Racing	(United States) #27 CRP/Daskalos Racing	No Entries	(Germany) #098 Rotek Racing	Report
7	R2	(Alabama) Barber	(United States) Jason Daskalos	(United States) Jason Daskalos	No Entries	(United States) Isaac Sherman	Report
8	R1	(Indiana) Indianapolis	(United States) #29 Turner Motorsport	(United States) #29 Turner Motorsport	(United States) #10 Lone Star Racing	(Germany) #098 Rotek Racing	Report
8	R1	(Indiana) Indianapolis	(United States) Justin Rothberg	(United States) Justin Rothberg	(United States) Dan Knox	(United States) Isaac Sherman	Report
8	R2	(Indiana) Indianapolis	(United States) #29 Turner Motorsport	(United States) #29 Turner Motorsport	(United States) #58 GMG Racing	(Germany) #098 Rotek Racing	Report
8	R2	(Indiana) Indianapolis	(United States) Justin Rothberg	(United States) Justin Rothberg	(United States) CJ Moses	(United States) Isaac Sherman	Report

== Championship Standings ==
Scoring System

Championship points are awarded for the first ten positions in each race. Entries are required to complete 75% of the winning car's race distance in order to be classified and earn points.

Position	**1st**	**2nd**	**3rd**	**4th**	**5th**	**6th**	**7th**	**8th**	**9th**	**10th**
Points	25	18	15	12	10	8	6	4	2	1

=== Drivers' Championships ===
Pos.	Driver	Team	1		2		3		4		5		6		7		8		Points
Pos.	Driver	Team	(California) SON		(California) LBH		(Florida) SEB		(Texas) COTA		(Virginia) VIR		(Wisconsin) ELK		(Alabama) BAR		(Indiana) IND		Points
Pos.	Driver	Team	RD1	RD2	RD1	RD2	RD1	RD2	RD1	RD2	RD1	RD2	RD1	RD2	RD1	RD2	RD1	RD2	Points
SRO3
1	(United States) Johnny O'Connell	(United States) SKI Autosports	2	1	**2**	3	3	2	**2**	13	3	**1**	3	3	13	2	2	2	259
2	(United States) Justin Rothberg	(United States) Turner Motorsport	6	5	4	4	4	3	5	3	**1**	2	**1**	2	2	8	1	1	258
3	(United States) Jason Daskalos	(United States) CRP/Daskalos Racing	**1**	6	1	**1**	2	4	1	11	15	3	2	4	1	1	7	6	255
4	(United States) Kyle Washington	(United States) GMG Racing	9	4	5	8	Ret	5	6	2	5	5	6	6	3	4	4	4	153
5	(United States) James Sofronas	(United States) GMG Racing	8	**2**	3	2			4	10			5	**1**			3	15	129
6	(United States) George Kurtz	(United States) CrowdStrike Racing by Riley Motorsports	3	3			**1**	**1**	3	**1**	WD	WD							120
7	(United States) Jason Bell	(United States) Flying Lizard Motorsports	7	7	10	10	Ret	8	7	12	2	8	Ret	DNS	5	3	6	5	99
8	(Germany) Mirco Schultis	(Germany) Mishumotors	4	9	6	5	5	6					4	5			5	3	97
9	(United States) Ross Chouest	(United States) Chouest Povoledo Racing	5	19	7	7	6	7	17	4	4	4			4	Ret			86
10	(United States) Tim Savage	(United States) ProSport Competition	10	8			13	9	10	15	9	Ret	7	7	6	Ret			40
11	(United States) Elias Sabo	(United States) Flying Lizard Motorsports									6	6	DNS	DNS					16
12	(United States) Marc Austin	(United States) Lone Star Racing							8	5									14
13	(Canada) Jean-Frédéric Laberge	(Canada) Montreal Motorsport Group									12	7							10
14	(United States) John Roberts	(United States) Fast Track Racing							9	14									3
15	(United States) Bryson Morris	(United States) DXDT Racing											DNS	DNS					0
ineligible to score points
	(United States) Scott Dollahite	(United States) Dollahite Racing															9	7	-
GT2
1	(United States) Alan Grossberg	(United States) TPC with Dream Racing	19	11	12	13	**7**	**14**	**11**	**16**									155
2	(United States) Aaron Farhadi	(United States) TPC with Dream Racing	**11**	10	9	9													86
3	(United States) Dan Knox	(United States) Lone Star Racing			**8**	**6**											8		75
4	(United States) CJ Moses	(United States) GMG Racing			13	12											10	8	65
5	(United States) Brent Holden	(United States) GMG Racing	17	**18**	11	11													63
GT4
1	(United States) Isaac Sherman	(Germany) Rotek Racing	**12**	**12**	14	**14**	8	**10**	**12**	7	8	**9**	**13**	8	7	5	11	9	369
2	(United States) Curt Swearingin	(United States) ACI Motorsports	15	15	16	17	**9**	11	13	**6**	**7**	10	8	**9**	8	11	13		257
3	(United States) Gray Newell	(United States) Heart of Racing Team	13	14	**17**	16	10	12	14	8	11	12	9	10	9	6	16	10	236
4	(United States) Nicholas Shanny	(United States) Carrus Callas Raceteam	18	17	21	Ret	11	13	15	9	13	13	11	12	11	7	14	13	157
5	(United States) Todd Parriott	(United States) Flying Lizard Motorsports	16	16	20	20	12	15	Ret	Ret	14	14	10	11	10	9			119
6	(Canada) Damir Hot	(United States) Flying Lizard Motorsports							WD	WD	10	11					12	11	63
7	(United States) Alan Grossberg	(United States) TPC Racing											14	13	12	10	15	14	50
8	(United States) Todd Coleman	(United States) Archangel Motorsports	14	13	Ret	18													45
9	(Canada) Samantha Tan	(Canada) STR38 Motorsports			18	15													28
10	(United States) Farhan Siddiqi	(United States) FastMD Racing with Remstar Racing							16	Ret			12	14					26
11	(United States) Robb Holland	(Germany) Rotek Racing			15	Ret													18
12	(United States) Elias Sabo	(United States) Flying Lizard Motorsports			19	19													16
13	(United States) Joseph Catania	(United States) Rigid Speed Company									DNS	15							6
Ineligible to score points
	(United States) Tim Savage	(United States) ProSport Competition															Ret	12	-
	(United States) Alan Teo	(United States) Orlando Motorsports Services															17		-
Pos.	Driver	Team	(California) SON		(California) LBH		(Florida) SEB		(Texas) COTA		(Virginia) VIR		(Wisconsin) ELK		(Alabama) BAR		(Indiana) IND		Points

Key
Colour	Result
Gold	Race winner
Silver	2nd place
Bronze	3rd place
Green	Points finish
Blue	Non-points finish
Blue	Non-classified finish (NC)
Purple	Did not finish (Ret)
Black	Disqualified (DSQ)
Black	Excluded (EX)
White	Did not start (DNS)
White	Race cancelled (C)
White	Withdrew (WD)
Blank	Did not participate

**Bold** – Pole
Italics – Fastest Lap

Notes

- † – Drivers did not finish the race but were classified, as they completed more than 75% of the race distance.
- ‡ – Post-event penalty. Car moved to back of class.
