= Justin Rothberg =

American racing driver (born 2002)

- Nationality: (United States) American
- Born: February 9, 2002 (age 24) Miami, Florida, U.S.
- Relatives: Jonathan Rothberg (uncle)

GT World Challenge America career
- Debut season: 2024
- Current team: Turner Motorsport
- Categorisation: FIA Silver
- Starts: 26
- Wins: 7
- Podiums: 18
- Poles: 4
- Fastest laps: 2
- Best finish: 1st in 2024, 2025

Championship titles
- 2025 2024–2025 2023: GT America Series - SRO3; GT World Challenge America - Pro-Am; Ferrari Challenge North America - Trofeo Pirelli Am

Awards
- 2024–2025: BMW M Sports Trophy

Justin Rothberg (born February 9, 2002) is an American racing driver who currently competes in GT World Challenge America for Turner Motorsport in the Pro class.

== Career ==
=== Early career ===
Rothberg began his career in Ferrari Challenge North America in the Coppa Shell class in 2022. He contested half of the season, taking a win a Sonoma Raceway. Rothberg returned the following year, this time competing in the Trofeo Pirelli Am class, winning six times en route to the championship title.

=== 2024 ===
In 2024, Rothberg stepped up to SRO competition, racing in the GT America Series and GT World Challenge America for Turner Motorsport in a BMW M4 GT3. He and his driver coach, Robby Foley won two races and finished on the podium eight times to claim the Pro-Am class championship in GT World Challenge America. In GT America, Rothberg finished one point shy of the SRO3 championship, losing out to SKI Autosport's Johnny O’Connell.

=== 2025 ===
For the 2025 season, Rothberg again pulled double duty in the GT America Series and GT World Challenge America for Turner Motorsport in a BMW M4 GT3 Evo. After a fourth-place finish at the penultimate race at Indianapolis, he secured the SRO3 title in GT America. Foley and Rothberg successfully defended their Pro-Am class championship in GT World Challenge America with five wins and ten podiums.

Rothberg also made a one-off appearance in the ARCA Menards Series for Nitro Motorsports at the 2025 Owens Corning 200 at Toledo Speedway. He qualified 13th and finished 17th.

=== 2026 ===
After no longer receiving a derogation by SRO America to his driver rating, Rothberg, Foley and Turner Motorsport were forced to step up to the Pro class of GT World Challenge America for 2026.

== Racing record ==
=== Racing career summary ===
Season	Series	Team	Races	Wins	Poles	F/Laps	Podiums	Points	Position
2022	Ferrari Challenge North America - Coppa Shell	Ferrari of Palm Beach	7	1	0	2	2	?	?
2023	Ferrari Challenge North America - Trofeo Pirelli Am	Conquest Racing	14	6	4	8	12	157	**1st**
2024	GT America Series - SRO3	Turner Motorsport	16	4	4	2	8	258	**2nd**
2024	GT World Challenge America - Pro-Am	Turner Motorsport	13	2	0	1	8	228	**1st**
2024	Intercontinental GT Challenge	Turner Motorsport	1	0	0	0	0	8	20th
2025	GT America Series - SRO3	Turner Motorsport	15	6	5	4	11	278	**1st**
2025	GT World Challenge America - Pro-Am	Turner Motorsport	13	5	4	1	10	260	**1st**
2025	Intercontinental GT Challenge	Turner Motorsport	1	0	0	0	0	1	32nd
2025	ARCA Menards Series	Nitro Motorsports	1	0	0	0	0	27	118th
2026	GT World Challenge America - Pro	Turner Motorsport	7	3	1	2	4	154	**1st**
2026	Intercontinental GT Challenge	Turner Motorsport	1	0	0	0	1	18	20th

* Season still in progress.
† As Rothberg was a guest driver, he was ineligible for points

=== Complete GT America Series results ===
(key) (Races in bold indicate pole position) (Races in italics indicate fastest lap)

Year	Team	Class	Make	1	2	3	4	5	6	7	8	9	10	11	12	13	14	15	16	Pos.	Points
2024	Turner Motorsport	SRO3	BMW M4 GT3	SON 1; 6	SON 2; 5	LBH 1; 4	LBH 2; 4	SEB 1; 4	SEB 2; 3	AUS 1; 5	AUS 2; 3	**VIR 1**; 1	VIR 2; 2	**ELK 1**; 1	ELK 2; 2	BAR 1; 2	BAR 2; 8	IND 1; 1	IND 2; 1	2nd	258
2025	Turner Motorsport	SRO3	BMW M4 GT3 Evo	SON 1; 5	SON 2; 2	LBH 1; 1	LBH 2; 1	AUS 1; 2	**AUS 2**; 1	SEB 1; 2	SEB 2; 3	**VIR 1**; 1	**VIR 2**; 1	ELK 1; 5	ELK 2; 3	BAR 1; 4	BAR 2; 1	IND 1; 4	IND 2 DNS	1st	278

=== Complete GT World Challenge America results ===
(key) (Races in bold indicate pole position) (Races in italics indicate fastest lap)

Year	Team	Class	Make	1	2	3	4	5	6	7	8	9	10	11	12	13	Pos.	Points
2024	Turner Motorsport	Pro-Am	BMW M4 GT3	SON 1; 3	SON 2; 4	SEB 1; 2	SEB 2; 1	AUS 1; 4	AUS 2; 2	VIR 1; 7	VIR 2; 4	ELK 1; 1	ELK 2; 8	BAR 1; 3	BAR 2; 2	IND; 1	1st	228
2025	Turner Motorsport	Pro-Am	BMW M4 GT3 Evo	SON 1; 1	SON 2; 3	AUS 1; 2	**AUS 2**; 5	SEB 1; 3	**SEB 2**; 1	VIR 1; 1	**VIR 2**; 1	ELK 1; 7	ELK 2; 2	BAR 1; 1	BAR 2; 7	**IND**; 1	1st	260
2026	Turner Motorsport	Pro	BMW M4 GT3 Evo	SON; 5	AUS; 2	SEB; 1	ATL; 4	ELK; 1	BAR; 4	**IND**; 1							1st	154

* Season still in progress.

=== Complete Intercontinental GT Challenge results ===
(key) (Races in bold indicate pole position) (Races in italics indicate fastest lap)

Year	Manufacturer	Car	1	2	3	4	5	Pos.	Points
2024	BMW	BMW M4 GT3	BAT	NÜR	SPA	IND; 6		20th	8
2025	BMW	BMW M4 GT3 Evo	BAT	NÜR	SPA	SUZ	IND; 10	32nd	1
2026	BMW	BMW M4 GT3 Evo	BAT	NÜR	SPA	SUZ	IND; 2	20th	18

=== ARCA Menards Series ===
(key) (Bold – Pole position awarded by qualifying time. Italics – Pole position earned by points standings or practice time. * – Most laps led.)

ARCA Menards Series results
Year	Team	No.	Make	1	2	3	4	5	6	7	8	9	10	11	12	13	14	15	16	17	18	19	20	AMSC	Pts	Ref
2025	Nitro Motorsports	70	Toyota	DAY	PHO	TAL	KAN	CLT	MCH	BLN	ELK	LRP	DOV	IRP	IOW	GLN	ISF	MAD	DSF	BRI	SLM	KAN	TOL; 17	118th	27	
