= Gray Newell =

American racing driver (born 1997)

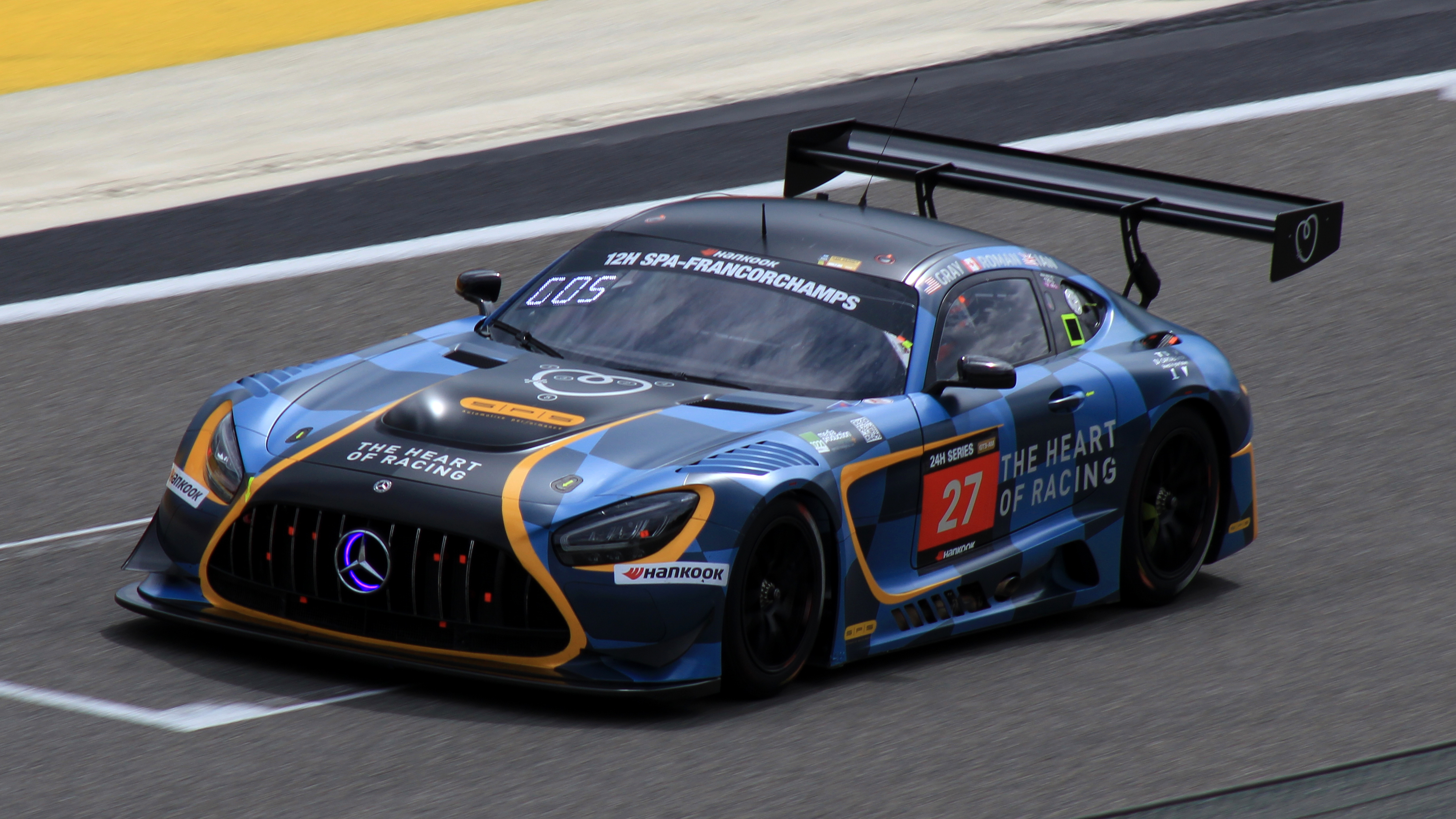
- Newell at the Circuit de Spa-Francorchamps in 2023
- Nationality: (United States) American
- Born: October 7, 1997 (age 29) Seattle, Washington, United States
- Relatives: Gabe Newell (father)

FIA World Endurance Championship career
- Debut season: 2026
- Current team: Heart of Racing Team
- Categorisation: FIA Silver (2021–2024); FIA Bronze (2025–)
- Car number: 23
- Starts: 8
- Wins: 0
- Podiums: 3
- Poles: 2
- Fastest laps: 0
- Best finish: 7th in 2026 (LMGT3)

Previous series
- 2025 2023–24, 2025 2021–2025 2024 2021–2024 2021–2024: GT World Challenge America; Middle East Trophy; GT America Series; Le Mans Cup; GT4 America Series; 24H Series

Gray Newell (born October 7, 1997) is an American racing driver who competes in the Asian Le Mans Series with the Heart of Racing. He previously competed in the LMGT3 class of the FIA World Endurance Championship with the Heart of Racing.

Newell is the eldest son of Gabe Newell, the co-founder of the video game company Valve Corporation and the racing team The Heart of Racing.

== Personal life ==
Newell was born on October 7, 1997, as the son of Gabe Newell, the co-founder of the video game company Valve. He is the eldest child, having a younger brother named Luc Mennet. Newell was the inspiration for the final boss in Valve's 1998 video game Half-Life, as his parents considered childbirth to be the most frightening thing they could think of at the time.

== Software career ==
In his early twenties, Newell decided to go into game development like his father. Inspired by the game Titanfall, Newell set out to develop his own game. He went on to co-found indie-studio Naetyr Games. Their project was titled Fury, an MMO first-person shooter that he described as "similar to Garry's Mod, Spore, and in the same vein as Star Citizen." The team at Naetyr was in the pre-production development phase before Newell decided to leave the studio and development on Fury to focus on his racing career.

== Racing career ==
=== GT4 America Series ===
==== 2021 ====
Newell started his career in racing relatively late at the age of 23. He made his debut in the series with the Heart of Racing Team driving in the Pro-Am category. He paired up with Heart of Racing Team co-founder Ian James. The duo's most successful weekend was at Watkins Glen, where they finished second in race one and won race two in class. Newell finished the season thirteenth in the championship.

==== 2022 ====
Newell returned to the series for the 2022 season, once again driving for the Heart of Racing Team with Ian James. Following a disappointing start to the season at Sonoma, Newell and James secured their first podium in class of the season during race one at NOLA. The momentum for the pair carried into the following weekend at VIR, finishing fourth in race one, and second in race two. At Watkins Glen, Newell and James went on to win race one in class, giving Newell his second victory in the series. During qualifying at Road America, Newell took his maiden pole position in the series for race one. In the race, Newell held the lead during his entire stint, with James taking over in the second half of the race. A late race charge from second place Jason Hart ensued in the final minutes of the race. Hart and James battled for the lead, with the two eventually making contact at turn 3, sending Hart into the grass. James finished first on the road, however, a two-position penalty was given for avoidable contact, awarding the win to Elliott Skeer, and leaving Newell and James to finish third. Following an absence from the penultimate weekend at Sebring, Newell secured his second pole position at Indianapolis. The pair finished third in race one and fourth in race two.

==== 2023 ====
Newell returned for a third consecutive season in 2023 with the Heart of Racing Team and Ian James. Following a disappointing round one at Sonoma, James was replaced by Canadian Roman De Angelis for the remainder of the season. At NOLA Motorsports Park, Newell qualified on pole for race one. During the race, De Angelis was running in third when the lead two cars received penalties, allowing Newell and De Angelis to take the race win. During round four at VIR, Newell was given a two-race suspension by series organizers SRO America for exceeding the maximum amount of behavior warning points. This came about from an incident during race one at VIR in the GT America Series, where Newell was deemed responsible. The following weekend at Road America saw a return to form for Newell and De Angelis, winning race one in class. Newell took his second pole of the season at Sebring. Newell's race wouldn't last long however, as a collision with Elias Sabo on lap one sent both drivers into the wall. The final weekend at Indianapolis was the pair's best weekend yet, winning race one and finishing third in race two.

==== 2024 ====
In his fourth year in the series, Newell reunited with Roman De Angelis and the Heart of Racing Team. Newell kicked off his season well, finishing second and fourth in races one and two at Sonoma. He and De Angelis were consistent in the first half of the season, scoring points in every race. At Road America, Newell took his first pole of the season. During race one, Newell fought for the lead with Kay Van Berlo, eventually losing out and finishing third. Newell and De Angelis rebounded in race two to take the win in class. At Barber, the duo experienced a mid-season car change, receiving the new Aston Martin Vantage GT4 Evo. They qualified on pole once again, with Newell at the helm. Unfortunately, Newell dropped down the order following a restart, and finished the race in seventh. After starting 26th on the grid in race two, De Angelis made his way up to third overall, and eventually took the lead. He went on to get his and Newell's second victory of the season. They closed off the season on a high with a second place at Indianapolis. Newell finished second in the championship, his highest finish in the series.

=== GT America Series ===
==== 2021 ====
Alongside his GT4 America Series campaign, Newell also contested the full GT America Series in the GT4 class with the Heart of Racing Team. The first half of the season was consistent for Newell, finishing inside the top-10 in every race up till Road America. Towards the latter part of the season, he began to put in impressive performances, getting a second place finish in race one at Watkins Glen. Newell carried this momentum to the rest of the remaining races, finishing on the podium twice more at Sebring and Indianapolis. During race two at Indianapolis, Newell took the lead of the race and went on to take his maiden victory in the series.

==== 2022 ====
Newell returned to the series for the 2022 season, once again competing in the GT4 class with the Heart of Racing Team. He had a consistent season, scoring points in a majority of the races he competed in.

==== 2023 ====
Newell returned for a third consecutive season in 2023 with the Heart of Racing Team in the GT4 class. At the season opener in St. Petersburg, he finished on the podium in both races. Newell finished thrice more on the podium at NOLA and both COTA races. After the COTA races, Newell sat third in the championship, 23 points behind the championship leader. In qualifying at VIR, he put his car on pole position, which was his first in the series. Unfortunately, this momentum did not carry over to the race, as he had an incident with GT2 driver CJ Moses. Moses was weaving across the track with Newell attempting to leave a gap, but the two ultimately collided. Newell was deemed responsible by the stewards and received a two-race suspension in both GT America and GT4 America for exceeding the maximum amount of behavior warning points. During the second half of the season, Newell was consistent, finishing no lower than sixth in the following five races. At Indianapolis, he took his second pole of the season for race one, and finished the race in third. Newell closed out his season fourth in the championship.

==== 2024 ====
Newell's fourth season in 2024 with the Heart of Racing Team started well, securing podium finishes in both races at Sonoma. He scored his first pole of the season during the next round at Long Beach. Newell had five consecutive podiums from Long Beach to COTA, elevating him up the standings. In the second half of the season, Newell had another run of podium finishes from Road America to Barber. He secured a second place finish during the final race of the season at Indianapolis. Newell's consistency throughout the season allowed him to secure his best championship finish of third.

==== 2025 ====
Newell made a one-off appearance during the 2025 season at Long Beach, where he took the overall pole for race one. He finished on the podium in third.

=== GT World Challenge America ===
For 2025, Newell moved up full-time to GT3 machinery, remaining with the Heart of Racing Team to compete in the 2025 GT World Challenge America season. Veteran sportscar driver Darren Turner partnered Newell for the season. The opening round at Sonoma was mixed, with the duo finishing inside the points for race one and scoring a non-points paying position in race two. Following a string of points finishes in the next four races, Newell had his best weekend yet at VIR. During race one, the pair were in contention for the Pro-Am win, however, a late race pass from Robby Foley on Turner meant that they had to settle for second. In race two, third place runner Kyle Washington retired late in the race, promoting Newell and Turner to third in the Pro-Am class. At Road America, another penalty for a competitor in race two awarded Newell a podium. Ahead of the 8 Hours of Indianapolis, Zacharie Robichon joined as the third driver in Newell's entry. They had a successful race, finishing second in the Pro-Am class. Newell ended the season fourth in the championship.

=== FIA World Endurance Championship ===
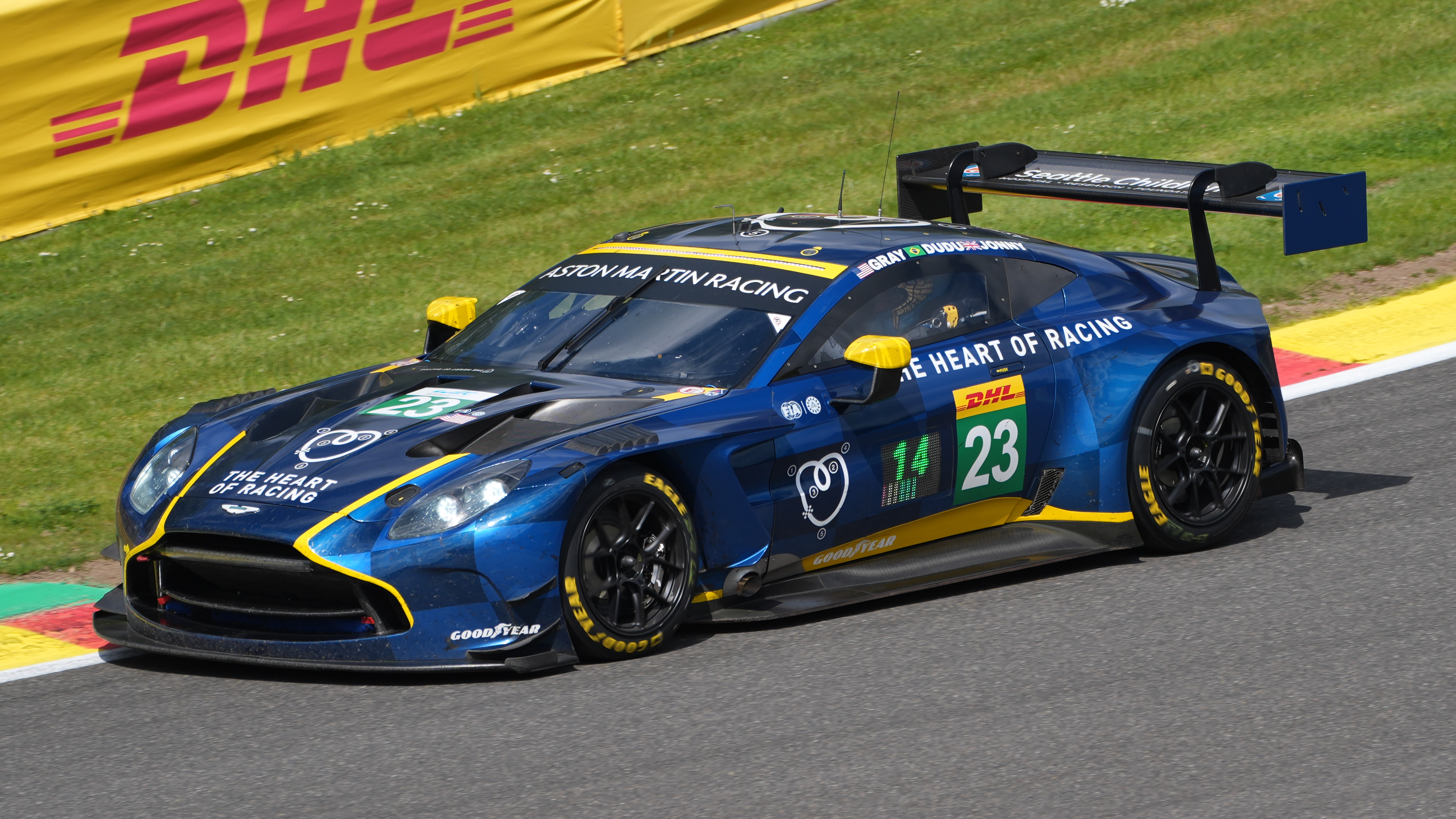
Newell's Aston Martin Vantage AMR GT3 Evo at the 2026 6 Hours of Spa-Francorchamps

Following years of competing in the United States, Newell and the Heart of Racing Team announced that he would enter the top stage of endurance racing, competing full-time in the LMGT3 class of the 2026 FIA World Endurance Championship. Jonny Adam and Eduardo Barrichello joined Newell as his teammates for the season. Ahead of the 6 Hours of Imola, Kobe Pauwels was brought in to replace Barrichello as the Brazilian had a clashing IMSA SportsCar Championship race during the same weekend. Despite this change, Newell had a successful weekend, finishing in the points in ninth on his debut. In his first qualifying session at Le Mans, Newell qualified third in his group, promoting him and his teammates to the Hyperpole 1 session. Barrichello put the car into Hyperpole 2, and Adam qualified their entry eighth on the LMGT3 grid. They contended for the LMGT3 class victory throughout the race, and ended on the podium in third.

== Racing record ==
=== Racing career summary ===
| Season | Series | Team | Races | Wins | Poles | F/Laps | Podiums | Points | Position |
|---|---|---|---|---|---|---|---|---|---|
| 2021 | GT America Series – GT4 | Heart of Racing Team | 16 | 1 | 0 | 1 | 4 | 105 | 5th |
| 2021 | 24H GT Series – GT4 | Heart of Racing Team | 1 | 0 | 0 | 0 | 0 | 0 | 45th |
| 2021 | GT4 America Series – Pro-Am | Heart of Racing Team | 14 | 1 | 0 | 0 | 2 | 63 | 13th |
| 2022 | 24H GT Series – GT4 | Heart of Racing Team | 1 | 0 | 0 | 0 | 1 | 29 | 5th |
| 2022 | GT America Series – GT4 | Heart of Racing Team | 14 | 0 | 0 | 0 | 0 | 83 | 7th |
| 2022 | GT4 America Series – Pro-Am | Heart of Racing Team | 10 | 1 | 2 | 0 | 5 | 117 | 5th |
| 2023 | 24H GT Series – GT3 Am | Heart of Racing Team by SPS | 2 | 2 | 1 | 2 | 2 | 80 | 4th |
| 2023 | GT4 America Series – Pro-Am | Heart of Racing Team | 13 | 3 | 2 | 0 | 4 | 119 | 4th |
| 2023 | GT America Series – GT4 | Heart of Racing Team | 17 | 0 | 2 | 1 | 5 | 179 | 4th |
| 2023–24 | Middle East Trophy – GT3 Pro-Am | Heart of Racing Team by SPS | 1 | 0 | 0 | 0 | 0 | ? | ? |
| 2024 | 24H Series – GT3 Am | Heart of Racing Team by SPS | 1 | 0 | 0 | 1 | 0 | 28 | 17th |
| 2024 | Le Mans Cup – GT3 | Heart of Racing Team by SPS | 1 | 0 | 0 | 0 | 0 | 0 | 28th |
| 2024 | GT4 America Series – Pro-Am | Heart of Racing Team | 13 | 2 | 2 | 0 | 6 | 186 | **2nd** |
| 2024 | GT America Series – GT4 | Heart of Racing Team | 16 | 0 | 1 | 1 | 12 | 177 | **3rd** |
| 2025 | Middle East Trophy – GT3 Am | Heart of Racing Team by SPS | 1 | 0 | 0 | 0 | 0 | 0 | 20th |
| 2025 | 24H Series – GT3 Am | Heart of Racing Team by SPS | 1 | 1 | 1 | 0 | 1 | 40 | 9th |
| 2025 | GT World Challenge America – Pro-Am | Heart of Racing Team | 13 | 0 | 0 | 0 | 4 | 144 | 4th |
| 2025 | GT America Series – GT3 | Heart of Racing Team | 2 | 0 | 1 | 0 | 1 | 17 | 12th |
| 2026 | FIA World Endurance Championship – LMGT3 | Heart of Racing Team | 8 | 0 | 2 | 0 | 3 | 69 | 7th |
| 2026 | 24 Hours of Le Mans – LMGT3 | Heart of Racing Team | 1 | 0 | 0 | 0 | 1 | – | **3rd** |
| 2026–27 | Asian Le Mans Series – GT3 | Heart of Racing Team | 2 | 0 | 0 | 0 | 0 | 0* | 16th* |

† As Newell was a guest driver, he was ineligible to score points.

* Season still in progress.

=== Complete GT America Series results ===
(key) (Races in bold indicate pole position; results in italics indicate fastest lap)

| Year | Entrant | Class | Chassis | Engine | 1 | 2 | 3 | 4 | 5 | 6 | 7 | 8 | 9 | 10 | 11 | 12 | 13 | 14 | 15 | 16 | 17 | 18 | Rank | Points | Ref |
|---|---|---|---|---|---|---|---|---|---|---|---|---|---|---|---|---|---|---|---|---|---|---|---|---|---|
| 2021 | Heart of Racing Team | GT4 | Aston Martin Vantage AMR GT4 | Aston Martin M177 4.0 L Turbo V8 | SON; 1; 10 | SON; 2; 9 | AUS; 1; 7 | AUS; 2; 4 | VIR; 1; 7 | VIR; 2; 5 | NSH; 1; 9 | NSH; 2; 9 | ELK; 1; 7 | ELK; 2 Ret | WGL; 1; 2 | WGL; 2 Ret | SEB; 1; 9 | SEB; 2; 2 | IND; 1; 2 | IND; 2; 1 | | | 5th | 105 | |
| 2022 | Heart of Racing Team | GT4 | Aston Martin Vantage AMR GT4 | Aston Martin M177 4.0 L Turbo V8 | STP; 1; 7 | STP; 2; 5 | SON; 1; 4 | SON; 2 Ret | VIR; 1; 9 | VIR; 2; 4 | WGL; 1; 6 | WGL; 2; 5 | NSH; 1 Ret | NSH; 2; 8 | ELK; 1; 10 | ELK; 2; 12 | SEB; 1 | SEB; 2 | IND; 1; 4 | IND; 2; 4 | | | 7th | 83 | |
| 2023 | Heart of Racing Team | GT4 | Aston Martin Vantage AMR GT4 | Aston Martin M177 4.0 L Turbo V8 | STP; 1; 2 | STP; 2; 2 | SON; 1; 5 | SON; 2; 4 | NOL; 1; 3 | NOL; 2; 7 | COA; 1; 3 | COA; 2; 3 | **VIR**; **1**; 9 | VIR; 2 WD | NSH; 1 Ret | NSH; 2; 4 | ELK; 1; 6 | ELK; 2; 4 | SEB; 1; 4 | SEB; 2; 5 | **IND**; **1**; 3 | IND; 2; 4 | 4th | 179 | |
| 2024 | Heart of Racing Team | GT4 | Aston Martin Vantage AMR GT4 | Aston Martin M177 4.0 L Turbo V8 | SON; 1; 2 | SON; 2; 3 | **LBH**; **1**; 4 | LBH; 2; 3 | SEB; 1; 3 | SEB; 2; 3 | COA; 1; 3 | COA; 2; 3 | VIR; 1; 4 | VIR; 2; 4 | ELK; 1; 2 | ELK; 2; 3 | BAR; 1; 3 | BAR; 2; 2 | IND; 1; 6 | IND; 2; 2 | | | 3rd | 236 | |
| 2025 | Heart of Racing Team | GT3 | Aston Martin Vantage AMR GT3 Evo | Aston Martin M177 4.0 L Turbo V8 | SON; 1 | SON; 2 | **LBH**; **1**; 3 | LBH; 2; 9 | COA; 1 | COA; 2 | SEB; 1 | SEB; 2 | VIR; 1 | VIR; 2 | ELK; 1 | ELK; 2 | BAR; 1 | BAR; 2 | IND; 1 | IND; 2 | | | 12th | 17 | |

=== Complete GT4 America Series results ===
(key) (Races in bold indicate pole position; results in italics indicate fastest lap)

| Year | Entrant | Class | Chassis | Engine | 1 | 2 | 3 | 4 | 5 | 6 | 7 | 8 | 9 | 10 | 11 | 12 | 13 | 14 | 15 | Rank | Points | Ref |
|---|---|---|---|---|---|---|---|---|---|---|---|---|---|---|---|---|---|---|---|---|---|---|
| 2021 | Heart of Racing Team | Pro-Am | Aston Martin Vantage AMR GT4 | Aston Martin M177 4.0 L Turbo V8 | SON; 1; 11 | SON; 2; 11 | AUS; 1; 12 | AUS; 2; 9 | VIR; 1; 10 | VIR; 2; 10 | ELK; 1; 14 | ELK; 2; 7 | WGL; 1; 2 | WGL; 2; 1 | SEB; 1; 16 | SEB; 2; 15 | IMS; 1; 9 | IMS; 2; 5 | | 13th | 63 | |
| 2022 | Heart of Racing Team | Pro-Am | Aston Martin Vantage AMR GT4 | Aston Martin M177 4.0 L Turbo V8 | SON; 1; 8 | SON; 2 DNS | NOL; 1; 3 | NOL; 2 Ret | VIR; 1; 4 | VIR; 2; 2 | WGL; 1; 1 | WGL; 2; 10 | **ELK**; **1**; 3 | ELK; 2 DNS | SEB; 1 | SEB; 2 | **IMS**; **1**; 3 | IMS; 2; 4 | | 5th | 117 | |
| 2023 | Heart of Racing Team | Pro-Am | Aston Martin Vantage AMR GT4 | Aston Martin M177 4.0 L Turbo V8 | SON; 1; 11 | SON; 2; 11 | **NOL**; **1**; 1 | NOL; 2 C | COA; 1; 9 | COA; 2; 15 | VIR; 1 DNS | VIR; 2; 6 | ROA; 1; 1 | ROA; 2; 8 | SEB; 1; 5 | **SEB**; **2** Ret | SEB; 3; 8 | IMS; 1; 1 | IMS; 2; 3 | 4th | 179 | |
| 2024 | Heart of Racing Team | Pro-Am | Aston Martin Vantage AMR GT4 | Aston Martin M177 4.0 L Turbo V8 | SON; 1; 2 | SON; 2; 4 | SEB; 1; 6 | SEB; 2; 3 | COA; 5† | VIR; 1; 5 | VIR; 2; 6 | **ELK**; **1**; 3 | ELK; 2; 1 | **BAR**; **1**; 7 | BAR; 2; 1 | IND; 1; 11 | IND; 2; 2 | | | 2nd | 286 | |

=== Complete GT World Challenge America results ===
(key) (Races in bold indicate pole position; results in italics indicate fastest lap)

| Year | Entrant | Class | Chassis | Engine | 1 | 2 | 3 | 4 | 5 | 6 | 7 | 8 | 9 | 10 | 11 | 12 | 13 | Rank | Points | Ref |
|---|---|---|---|---|---|---|---|---|---|---|---|---|---|---|---|---|---|---|---|---|
| 2025 | Heart of Racing Team | Pro-Am | Aston Martin Vantage AMR GT3 Evo | Aston Martin M177 4.0 L Turbo V8 | SON; 1; 8 | SON; 2; 11 | COA; 1; 4 | COA; 2; 7 | SEB; 1; 7 | SEB; 2; 7 | VIR; 1; 2 | VIR; 2; 3 | ELK; 1; 6 | ELK; 2; 3 | BAR; 1; 4 | BAR; 2; 7 | IMS; 2 | 4th | 144 | |

=== Complete FIA World Endurance Championship results ===
(key) (Races in bold indicate pole position; results in italics indicate fastest lap)

| Year | Entrant | Class | Chassis | Engine | 1 | 2 | 3 | 4 | 5 | 6 | 7 | 8 | Rank | Points | Ref |
|---|---|---|---|---|---|---|---|---|---|---|---|---|---|---|---|
| 2026 | Heart of Racing Team | LMGT3 | Aston Martin Vantage AMR GT3 Evo | Aston Martin M177 4.0 L Turbo V8 | IMO; 9 | SPA; 12 | LMS; 3 | **SÃO**; 18 | **COA**; 3 | FUJ; Ret | CAT; 9 | MNZ; 2 | 7th | 69 | |

=== Complete 24 Hours of Le Mans results ===
| Year | Team | Co-Drivers | Car | Class | Laps | Pos. | Class Pos. | Ref |
|---|---|---|---|---|---|---|---|---|
| 2026 | (United States) Heart of Racing Team | (United Kingdom) Jonny Adam (Brazil) Eduardo Barrichello | Aston Martin Vantage AMR GT3 Evo | LMGT3 | 335 | 35th | **3rd** | |

=== Complete Asian Le Mans Series results ===
(key) (Races in bold indicate pole position; races in italics indicate fastest lap)

| Year | Entrant | Class | Chassis | Engine | 1 | 2 | 3 | 4 | 5 | 6 | Pos. | Pts |
|---|---|---|---|---|---|---|---|---|---|---|---|---|
| 2026–27 | The Heart of Racing | GT3 | Aston Martin Vantage AMR GT3 Evo | Aston Martin M177 4.0 L Turbo V8 | LEC; 1; 11 | LEC; 2; 14 | JER; 1 | JER; 2 | POR; 1 | POR; 2 | 16th* | 0* |

* Season still in progress.
