= GT America Series =

Sports car racing series based in the United States

- Category: Grand tourer (GT2, GT3, GT4)
- Country: United States
- Inaugural season: 2021
- Official website: https://www.gtamerica.us/

The GT America Series is a sports car racing series based in the United States which runs as a support series to the GT World Challenge America. It is managed by the Stéphane Ratel Organisation and sanctioned by the United States Auto Club.

== History ==
The series was announced in October 2020, replacing the GT Sports Club America and the Sprint category of the GT4 America Series. The first race was run on March 6, 2021, and was won by George Kurtz. At the end of the opening season, Charlie Luck was crowned the inaugural overall champion, while Jason Bell won the GT4 class championship.

=== Class structure ===
The series places strong emphasis on Bronze-rated and gentleman drivers in the single-driver sprint race format. Races are 40 minutes in length, with no required pit stops. Entries are split into three classes; SRO3 (featuring GT3-homologated cars), GT2, and GT4. Previous generation GT3 machinery is also homologated for the competition.

The 2021 season featured a GT3 Masters class, exclusively for drivers above the age of 50, which took a similar format to the former GT Sports Club's Titanium class. With many Bronze-rated drivers already over the age of 50, and inaugural champion Charlie Luck claiming both the Masters and Overall championships, the class was disbanded ahead of the 2022 season.

== Champions ==
| Year | GT3 Overall | GT2 | GT4 |
|---|---|---|---|
| 2021 | (United States) Charlie Luck (United States) Wright Motorsports | (United States) Elias Sabo (United States) GMG Racing | (United States) Jason Bell (United States) GMG Racing |
| 2022 | (United States) George Kurtz (United States) Crowdstrike Racing by Riley Motorsports | (United States) C.J. Moses (United States) GMG Racing | (United States) Ross Chouest (United States) GMG Racing |
| 2023 | (Mexico) Memo Gidley (United States) TKO Motorsports with Flying Lizard | (United States) C.J. Moses (United States) GMG Racing | (United States) Jason Bell (United States) Flying Lizard Motorsports |
| 2024 | (United States) Johnny O'Connell (United States) SKI Autosports | (United States) Alan Grossberg (United States) TPC with Dream Racing | (United States) Isaac Sherman (Germany) Rotek Racing |
| 2025 | (United States) Justin Rothberg (United States) Turner Motorsport | (United States) C.J. Moses (United States) GMG Racing | (United States) Anthony McIntosh (United States) JTR Motorsports Engineering |

== See also ==
- GT World Challenge America
- GT4 America Series
- TC America Series
