= 2025 GT World Challenge America =

Nineteenth season of GT World Challenge America

The 2025 GT World Challenge America Powered by AWS was the nineteenth season of the United States Auto Club's GT World Challenge America, and the eighth under ownership of SRO Motorsports Group.

The season began at Sonoma on March 28, and finished at Indianapolis on October 18.

== Calendar ==
The preliminary calendar released on June 26, 2024, at the SRO's annual 24 Hours of Spa press conference, featuring 14 races across seven rounds. On August 6, 2024, the calendar was finalized, and the date of Indianapolis round was pushed back two weeks.

| Round | Circuit | Date | Map |
|---|---|---|---|
| 1 | Sonoma Raceway, Sonoma, California | March 28–30 | 2025 GT World Challenge America is located in the United States |
| 2 | Circuit of the Americas, Austin, Texas | April 25–27 | 2025 GT World Challenge America is located in the United States |
| 3 | Sebring International Raceway, Sebring, Florida | May 16–18 | 2025 GT World Challenge America is located in the United States |
| 4 | Virginia International Raceway, Alton, Virginia | July 18–20 | 2025 GT World Challenge America is located in the United States |
| 5 | Road America, Elkhart Lake, Wisconsin | August 15–17 | 2025 GT World Challenge America is located in the United States |
| 6 | Barber Motorsports Park, Birmingham, Alabama | September 5–7 | 2025 GT World Challenge America is located in the United States |
| 7 | Indianapolis Motor Speedway, Indianapolis, Indiana | October 16–18 | 2025 GT World Challenge America is located in the United States |

== Entry list ==
| Team | Car | Engine | No. | Drivers | Class | Rounds |
|---|---|---|---|---|---|---|
| (United States) CrowdStrike Racing by Riley Motorsports | Mercedes-AMG GT3 Evo | Mercedes-AMG M159 6.2 L V8 | 04 | (United States) Colin Braun | PA | 1, 7 |
| (United States) CrowdStrike Racing by Riley Motorsports | Mercedes-AMG GT3 Evo | Mercedes-AMG M159 6.2 L V8 | 04 | (United States) George Kurtz | PA | 1, 7 |
| (United States) CrowdStrike Racing by Riley Motorsports | Mercedes-AMG GT3 Evo | Mercedes-AMG M159 6.2 L V8 | 04 | (United Kingdom) Toby Sowery | PA | 7 |
| (United States) Racers Edge Motorsports | Aston Martin Vantage AMR GT3 Evo | Aston Martin AMR16A 4.0 L Turbo V8 | 2 | (United States) Jason Bell | PA | 1–3 |
| (United States) Racers Edge Motorsports | Aston Martin Vantage AMR GT3 Evo | Aston Martin AMR16A 4.0 L Turbo V8 | 2 | (United States) Michael Cooper | PA | 1–3 |
| (United States) Dollahite Racing | Ford Mustang GT3 (Note: Scott Dollahite damaged the Ford Mustang GT3 chassis in Race 1 at Road America. Turner Motorsport provided Dollahite Racing with a spare BMW M4 GT3 Evo chassis for Race 2 to allow Eric Powell to take the start and score points.) | Ford Coyote 5.4 L V8 | 6 | (United States) Scott Dollahite | PA 1 Am 2–7 | All |
| (United States) Dollahite Racing | Ford Mustang GT3 | Ford Coyote 5.4 L V8 | 6 | (United States) Anthony Lazzaro | PA 1 Am 2–7 | 1–2 |
| (United States) Dollahite Racing | Ford Mustang GT3 | Ford Coyote 5.4 L V8 | 6 | (Italy) Stefano Gattuso | PA 1 Am 2–7 | 3, 7 |
| (United States) Dollahite Racing | Ford Mustang GT3 | Ford Coyote 5.4 L V8 | 6 | (United States) Eric Powell | PA 1 Am 2–7 | 4–7 |
| (Germany) Herberth Motorsport | Porsche 911 GT3 R (992) | Porsche M97/80 4.2 L Flat-6 | 7 | (Germany) Ralf Bohn | PA | 7 |
| (Germany) Herberth Motorsport | Porsche 911 GT3 R (992) | Porsche M97/80 4.2 L Flat-6 | 7 | (Switzerland) Rolf Ineichen | PA | 7 |
| (Germany) Herberth Motorsport | Porsche 911 GT3 R (992) | Porsche M97/80 4.2 L Flat-6 | 7 | (Germany) Robert Renauer | PA | 7 |
| (Germany) Blattner Company by Herberth Motorsport | Porsche 911 GT3 R (992) | Porsche M97/80 4.2 L Flat-6 | 21 | (United States) Dustin Blattner | PA | 7 |
| (Germany) Blattner Company by Herberth Motorsport | Porsche 911 GT3 R (992) | Porsche M97/80 4.2 L Flat-6 | 21 | (Germany) Alfred Renauer | PA | 7 |
| (Germany) Blattner Company by Herberth Motorsport | Porsche 911 GT3 R (992) | Porsche M97/80 4.2 L Flat-6 | 21 | (Germany) Dennis Marschall | PA | 7 |
| (United States) Flying Lizard Motorsports | BMW M4 GT3 Evo | BMW P58 3.0 L Twin Turbo I6 | 8 | (United States) Andy Lee | PA | 1–2 |
| (United States) Flying Lizard Motorsports | BMW M4 GT3 Evo | BMW P58 3.0 L Twin Turbo I6 | 8 | (United States) Elias Sabo | PA | 1–2 |
| (United States) Wright Motorsports | Porsche 911 GT3 R (992) | Porsche M97/80 4.2 L Flat-6 | 10 | (Hong Kong) Antares Au | PA | 7 |
| (United States) Wright Motorsports | Porsche 911 GT3 R (992) | Porsche M97/80 4.2 L Flat-6 | 10 | (Netherlands) Loek Hartog | PA | 7 |
| (United States) Wright Motorsports | Porsche 911 GT3 R (992) | Porsche M97/80 4.2 L Flat-6 | 10 | (Switzerland) Patric Niederhauser | PA | 7 |
| (United States) Wright Motorsports | Porsche 911 GT3 R (992) | Porsche M97/80 4.2 L Flat-6 | 120 | (United States) Adam Adelson | P | 7 |
| (United States) Wright Motorsports | Porsche 911 GT3 R (992) | Porsche M97/80 4.2 L Flat-6 | 120 | (Germany) Laurin Heinrich | P | 7 |
| (United States) Wright Motorsports | Porsche 911 GT3 R (992) | Porsche M97/80 4.2 L Flat-6 | 120 | (United States) Elliott Skeer | P | 7 |
| (United States) DXDT Racing | Chevrolet Corvette Z06 GT3.R | Chevrolet LT6.R 5.5 L V8 | 11 | (United Kingdom) Matt Bell | PA | All |
| (United States) DXDT Racing | Chevrolet Corvette Z06 GT3.R | Chevrolet LT6.R 5.5 L V8 | 11 | (United States) Blake McDonald | PA | All |
| (United States) DXDT Racing | Chevrolet Corvette Z06 GT3.R | Chevrolet LT6.R 5.5 L V8 | 11 | (United States) Alec Udell | PA | 7 |
| (Italy) AF Corse USA | Ferrari 296 GT3 | Ferrari F163CE 3.0 L Turbo V6 | 16 | (Brazil) Marcelo Hahn | PA | 1–2, 4–7 |
| (Italy) AF Corse USA | Ferrari 296 GT3 | Ferrari F163CE 3.0 L Turbo V6 | 16 | (Brazil) Allam Khodair | PA | 1–2, 7 |
| (Italy) AF Corse USA | Ferrari 296 GT3 | Ferrari F163CE 3.0 L Turbo V6 | 16 | (Brazil) Christian Hahn | PA | 4–5, 7 |
| (Italy) AF Corse USA | Ferrari 296 GT3 | Ferrari F163CE 3.0 L Turbo V6 | 16 | (Brazil) Diego Gomes Nunes | PA | 6 |
| (Italy) AF Corse USA | Ferrari 296 GT3 | Ferrari F163CE 3.0 L Turbo V6 | 163 | (Brazil) Oswaldo Negri Jr. | Am | 1–2, 4–7 |
| (Italy) AF Corse USA | Ferrari 296 GT3 | Ferrari F163CE 3.0 L Turbo V6 | 163 | (United States) Jay Schreibman | Am | 1–2, 4–7 |
| (Italy) AF Corse USA | Ferrari 296 GT3 | Ferrari F163CE 3.0 L Turbo V6 | 163 | (United States) Conrad Grunewald | Am | 7 |
| (United States) RS1 | Porsche 911 GT3 R (992) | Porsche M97/80 4.2 L Flat-6 | 18 | (Belgium) Jan Heylen | P | All |
| (United States) RS1 | Porsche 911 GT3 R (992) | Porsche M97/80 4.2 L Flat-6 | 18 | (United Kingdom) Alex Sedgwick | P | All |
| (United States) RS1 | Porsche 911 GT3 R (992) | Porsche M97/80 4.2 L Flat-6 | 18 | (Belgium) Alessio Picariello | P | 7 |
| (United States) Heart of Racing Team | Aston Martin Vantage AMR GT3 Evo | Aston Martin AMR16A 4.0 L Turbo V8 | 24 | (United States) Gray Newell | PA | All |
| (United States) Heart of Racing Team | Aston Martin Vantage AMR GT3 Evo | Aston Martin AMR16A 4.0 L Turbo V8 | 24 | (United Kingdom) Darren Turner | PA | All |
| (United States) Heart of Racing Team | Aston Martin Vantage AMR GT3 Evo | Aston Martin AMR16A 4.0 L Turbo V8 | 24 | (Canada) Zacharie Robichon | PA | 7 |
| (United States) CRP Racing | Mercedes-AMG GT3 Evo | Mercedes-AMG M159 6.2 L V8 | 27 | (United States) Jason Daskalos | PA | 1–6 |
| (United States) CRP Racing | Mercedes-AMG GT3 Evo | Mercedes-AMG M159 6.2 L V8 | 27 | (United States) Isaac Sherman | PA | 1–6 |
| (United States) Turner Motorsport | BMW M4 GT3 Evo | BMW P58 3.0 L Twin Turbo I6 | 29 | (United States) Robby Foley | PA | All |
| (United States) Turner Motorsport | BMW M4 GT3 Evo | BMW P58 3.0 L Twin Turbo I6 | 29 | (United States) Justin Rothberg | PA | All |
| (United States) Turner Motorsport | BMW M4 GT3 Evo | BMW P58 3.0 L Twin Turbo I6 | 29 | (United States) Patrick Gallagher | PA | 7 |
| (United States) GMG Racing | Porsche 911 GT3 R (992) | Porsche M97/80 4.2 L Flat-6 | 32 | (Australia) Tom Sargent | PA | All |
| (United States) GMG Racing | Porsche 911 GT3 R (992) | Porsche M97/80 4.2 L Flat-6 | 32 | (United States) Kyle Washington | PA | All |
| (United States) GMG Racing | Porsche 911 GT3 R (992) | Porsche M97/80 4.2 L Flat-6 | 32 | (Austria) Klaus Bachler | PA | 7 |
| (Canada) JMF Motorsports | Mercedes-AMG GT3 Evo | Mercedes-AMG M159 6.2 L V8 | 34 | (Canada) Mikaël Grenier | P | All |
| (Canada) JMF Motorsports | Mercedes-AMG GT3 Evo | Mercedes-AMG M159 6.2 L V8 | 34 | (United States) Michai Stephens | P | All |
| (Canada) JMF Motorsports | Mercedes-AMG GT3 Evo | Mercedes-AMG M159 6.2 L V8 | 34 | (Austria) Lucas Auer | P | 7 |
| (Belgium) Team WRT | BMW M4 GT3 Evo | BMW P58 3.0 L Twin Turbo I6 | 46 | (South Africa) Kelvin van der Linde | P | 7 |
| (Belgium) Team WRT | BMW M4 GT3 Evo | BMW P58 3.0 L Twin Turbo I6 | 46 | (Italy) Valentino Rossi | P | 7 |
| (Belgium) Team WRT | BMW M4 GT3 Evo | BMW P58 3.0 L Twin Turbo I6 | 46 | (Belgium) Charles Weerts | P | 7 |
| (Belgium) Team WRT | BMW M4 GT3 Evo | BMW P58 3.0 L Twin Turbo I6 | 777 | (Oman) Al Faisal Al Zubair | P | 7 |
| (Belgium) Team WRT | BMW M4 GT3 Evo | BMW P58 3.0 L Twin Turbo I6 | 777 | (Brazil) Augusto Farfus | P | 7 |
| (Belgium) Team WRT | BMW M4 GT3 Evo | BMW P58 3.0 L Twin Turbo I6 | 777 | (Switzerland) Raffaele Marciello | P | 7 |
| (United States) Chouest Povoledo Racing | Chevrolet Corvette Z06 GT3.R | Chevrolet LT6.R 5.5 L V8 | 50 | (United States) Ross Chouest | PA | All |
| (United States) Chouest Povoledo Racing | Chevrolet Corvette Z06 GT3.R | Chevrolet LT6.R 5.5 L V8 | 50 | (Canada) Aaron Povoledo | PA | All |
| (United States) Chouest Povoledo Racing | Chevrolet Corvette Z06 GT3.R | Chevrolet LT6.R 5.5 L V8 | 50 | (Netherlands) Nicky Catsburg | PA | 7 |
| (United States) Random Vandals Racing | BMW M4 GT3 Evo | BMW P58 3.0 L Twin Turbo I6 | 51 | (United States) Bill Auberlen | P | All |
| (United States) Random Vandals Racing | BMW M4 GT3 Evo | BMW P58 3.0 L Twin Turbo I6 | 51 | (United States) Varun Choksey | P | All |
| (United States) Random Vandals Racing | BMW M4 GT3 Evo | BMW P58 3.0 L Twin Turbo I6 | 51 | (Austria) Philipp Eng | P | 7 |
| (United States) Random Vandals Racing | BMW M4 GT3 Evo | BMW P58 3.0 L Twin Turbo I6 | 99 | (United States) Connor De Phillippi | P | All |
| (United States) Random Vandals Racing | BMW M4 GT3 Evo | BMW P58 3.0 L Twin Turbo I6 | 99 | (United States) Kenton Koch | P | All |
| (United States) Random Vandals Racing | BMW M4 GT3 Evo | BMW P58 3.0 L Twin Turbo I6 | 99 | (United States) Conor Daly | P | 7 |
| (New Zealand) EBM | Porsche 911 GT3 R (992) | Porsche M97/80 4.2 L Flat-6 | 61 | (Malaysia) Adrian D'Silva | P | 7 |
| (New Zealand) EBM | Porsche 911 GT3 R (992) | Porsche M97/80 4.2 L Flat-6 | 61 | (Switzerland) Ricardo Feller | P | 7 |
| (New Zealand) EBM | Porsche 911 GT3 R (992) | Porsche M97/80 4.2 L Flat-6 | 61 | (Germany) Sven Müller | P | 7 |
| (Australia) 75 Express | Mercedes-AMG GT3 Evo | Mercedes-AMG M159 6.2 L V8 | 75 | (Australia) Kenny Habul | P | 7 |
| (Australia) 75 Express | Mercedes-AMG GT3 Evo | Mercedes-AMG M159 6.2 L V8 | 75 | (Australia) Chaz Mostert | P | 7 |
| (Australia) 75 Express | Mercedes-AMG GT3 Evo | Mercedes-AMG M159 6.2 L V8 | 75 | (Australia) Will Power | P | 7 |
| (United States) Mercedes-AMG Lone Star Racing | Mercedes-AMG GT3 Evo | Mercedes-AMG M159 6.2 L V8 | 80 | (Andorra) Jules Gounon | P | 7 |
| (United States) Mercedes-AMG Lone Star Racing | Mercedes-AMG GT3 Evo | Mercedes-AMG M159 6.2 L V8 | 80 | (Netherlands) Lin Hodenius | P | 7 |
| (United States) Mercedes-AMG Lone Star Racing | Mercedes-AMG GT3 Evo | Mercedes-AMG M159 6.2 L V8 | 80 | (Belgium) Maxime Martin | P | 7 |
| (United States) Archangel Motorsports | McLaren 720S GT3 Evo | McLaren M840T 4.0 L Turbo V8 | 88 | (United States) Todd Coleman | PA | All |
| (United States) Archangel Motorsports | McLaren 720S GT3 Evo | McLaren M840T 4.0 L Turbo V8 | 88 | (United States) Aaron Telitz | PA | All |
| (United States) Archangel Motorsports | McLaren 720S GT3 Evo | McLaren M840T 4.0 L Turbo V8 | 88 | (United States) Thomas Merrill | PA | 7 |
| (United States) Regulator Racing | Mercedes-AMG GT3 Evo | Mercedes-AMG M159 6.2 L V8 | 91 | (United States) Jeff Burton | PA | All |
| (United States) Regulator Racing | Mercedes-AMG GT3 Evo | Mercedes-AMG M159 6.2 L V8 | 91 | (Switzerland) Philip Ellis | PA | All |
| (United States) Regulator Racing | Mercedes-AMG GT3 Evo | Mercedes-AMG M159 6.2 L V8 | 91 | (Netherlands) "Daan Arrow" | PA | 7 |
| (Canada) LAB Motorsport by GT Racing | Porsche 911 GT3 R (992) | Porsche M97/80 4.2 L Flat-6 | 92 | (Canada) Jean-Frédéric Laberge | PA | 1–4 |
| (Canada) LAB Motorsport by GT Racing | Porsche 911 GT3 R (992) | Porsche M97/80 4.2 L Flat-6 | 92 | (Canada) Kyle Marcelli | PA | 1–4 |
| (Hong Kong) Mercedes-AMG Team GMR | Mercedes-AMG GT3 Evo | Mercedes-AMG M159 6.2 L V8 | 888 | (Germany) Maro Engel | P | 7 |
| (Hong Kong) Mercedes-AMG Team GMR | Mercedes-AMG GT3 Evo | Mercedes-AMG M159 6.2 L V8 | 888 | (Germany) Tom Kalender | P | 7 |
| (Hong Kong) Mercedes-AMG Team GMR | Mercedes-AMG GT3 Evo | Mercedes-AMG M159 6.2 L V8 | 888 | (Germany) Luca Stolz | P | 7 |

| Icon | Class |
|---|---|
| P | Pro Cup |
| PA | Pro/Am Cup |
| Am | Am Cup |

== Race results ==
Bold indicates overall winner

| Round | | Circuit | Pole position | Pro Winners | Pro/Am Winners | Am Winners | Results |
|---|---|---|---|---|---|---|---|
| 1 | R1 | (California) Sonoma | (United States) #99 Random Vandals Racing | **(Canada) #34 JMF Motorsports** | (United States) #29 Turner Motorsport | (Italy) #163 AF Corse USA | Report |
| 1 | R1 | (California) Sonoma | (United States) Connor De Phillippi (United States) Kenton Koch | **(Canada) Mikaël Grenier** **(United States) Michai Stephens** | (United States) Robby Foley (United States) Justin Rothberg | (Brazil) Oswaldo Negri Jr. (United States) Jay Schreibman | Report |
| 1 | R2 | (California) Sonoma | (United States) #04 CrowdStrike Racing by Riley Motorsports | **(United States) #99 Random Vandals Racing** | (United States) #91 Regulator Racing | (Italy) #163 AF Corse USA | Report |
| 1 | R2 | (California) Sonoma | (United States) Colin Braun (United States) George Kurtz | **(United States) Connor De Phillippi** **(United States) Kenton Koch** | (United States) Jeff Burton (Switzerland) Philip Ellis | (Brazil) Oswaldo Negri Jr. (United States) Jay Schreibman | Report |
| 2 | R1 | (Texas) Austin | (United States) #91 Regulator Racing | **(United States) #99 Random Vandals Racing** | (United States) #11 DXDT Racing | (Italy) #163 AF Corse USA | Report |
| 2 | R1 | (Texas) Austin | (United States) Jeff Burton (Switzerland) Philip Ellis | **(United States) Connor De Phillippi** **(United States) Kenton Koch** | (United Kingdom) Matt Bell (United States) Blake McDonald | (Brazil) Oswaldo Negri Jr. (United States) Jay Schreibman | Report |
| 2 | R2 | (Texas) Austin | (United States) #29 Turner Motorsport | (Canada) #34 JMF Motorsports | **(United States) #91 Regulator Racing** | (United States) #6 Dollahite Racing | Report |
| 2 | R2 | (Texas) Austin | (United States) Robby Foley (United States) Justin Rothberg | (Canada) Mikaël Grenier (United States) Michai Stephens | **(United States) Jeff Burton** **(Switzerland) Philip Ellis** | (United States) Scott Dollahite (United States) Anthony Lazzaro | Report |
| 3 | R1 | (Florida) Sebring | (United States) #91 Regulator Racing | **(United States) #99 Random Vandals Racing** | (United States) #11 DXDT Racing | (United States) #6 Dollahite Racing | Report |
| 3 | R1 | (Florida) Sebring | (United States) Jeff Burton (Switzerland) Philip Ellis | **(United States) Connor De Phillippi** **(United States) Kenton Koch** | (United Kingdom) Matt Bell (United States) Blake McDonald | (United States) Scott Dollahite (Italy) Stefano Gattuso | Report |
| 3 | R2 | (Florida) Sebring | (United States) #29 Turner Motorsport | **(United States) #99 Random Vandals Racing** | (United States) #29 Turner Motorsport | (United States) #6 Dollahite Racing | Report |
| 3 | R2 | (Florida) Sebring | (United States) Robby Foley (United States) Justin Rothberg | **(United States) Connor De Phillippi** **(United States) Kenton Koch** | (United States) Robby Foley (United States) Justin Rothberg | (United States) Scott Dollahite (Italy) Stefano Gattuso | Report |
| 4 | R1 | Virginia | (United States) #91 Regulator Racing | **(United States) #18 RS1** | (United States) #29 Turner Motorsport | (Italy) #163 AF Corse USA | Report |
| 4 | R1 | Virginia | (United States) Jeff Burton (Switzerland) Philip Ellis | **(Belgium) Jan Heylen** **(United Kingdom) Alex Sedgwick** | (United States) Robby Foley (United States) Justin Rothberg | (Brazil) Oswaldo Negri Jr. (United States) Jay Schreibman | Report |
| 4 | R2 | Virginia | (United States) #18 RS1 | **(United States) #18 RS1** | (United States) #29 Turner Motorsport | (United States) #6 Dollahite Racing | Report |
| 4 | R2 | Virginia | (Belgium) Jan Heylen (United Kingdom) Alex Sedgwick | **(Belgium) Jan Heylen** **(United Kingdom) Alex Sedgwick** | (United States) Robby Foley (United States) Justin Rothberg | (United States) Scott Dollahite (United States) Eric Powell | Report |
| 5 | R1 | (Wisconsin) Road America | (United States) #91 Regulator Racing | (United States) #99 Random Vandals Racing | **(United States) #91 Regulator Racing** | (Italy) #163 AF Corse USA | Report |
| 5 | R1 | (Wisconsin) Road America | (United States) Jeff Burton (Switzerland) Philip Ellis | (United States) Connor De Phillippi (United States) Kenton Koch | **(United States) Jeff Burton** **(Switzerland) Philip Ellis** | (Brazil) Oswaldo Negri Jr. (United States) Jay Schreibman | Report |
| 5 | R2 | (Wisconsin) Road America | (United States) #11 DXDT Racing | **(Canada) #34 JMF Motorsports** | (United States) #11 DXDT Racing | (Italy) #163 AF Corse USA | Report |
| 5 | R2 | (Wisconsin) Road America | (United Kingdom) Matt Bell (United States) Blake McDonald | **(Canada) Mikaël Grenier** **(United States) Michai Stephens** | (United Kingdom) Matt Bell (United States) Blake McDonald | (Brazil) Oswaldo Negri Jr. (United States) Jay Schreibman | Report |
| 6 | R1 | (Alabama) Barber | (United States) #91 Regulator Racing | **(United States) #99 Random Vandals Racing** | (United States) #29 Turner Motorsport | (United States) #6 Dollahite Racing | Report |
| 6 | R1 | (Alabama) Barber | (United States) Jeff Burton (Switzerland) Philip Ellis | **(United States) Connor De Phillippi** **(United States) Kenton Koch** | (United States) Robby Foley (United States) Justin Rothberg | (United States) Scott Dollahite (United States) Eric Powell | Report |
| 6 | R2 | (Alabama) Barber | (Canada) #34 JMF Motorsports | **(Canada) #34 JMF Motorsports** | (United States) #11 DXDT Racing | (United States) #6 Dollahite Racing | Report |
| 6 | R2 | (Alabama) Barber | (Canada) Mikaël Grenier (United States) Michai Stephens | **(Canada) Mikaël Grenier** **(United States) Michai Stephens** | (United Kingdom) Matt Bell (United States) Blake McDonald | (United States) Scott Dollahite (United States) Eric Powell | Report |
| 7 | R1 | (Indiana) Indianapolis | (United States) #80 Mercedes-AMG Lone Star Racing | **(Belgium) #46 Team WRT** | (Germany) #21 Blattner Company by Herberth Motorsport | (Italy) #163 AF Corse USA | Report |
| 7 | R1 | (Indiana) Indianapolis | (Andorra) Jules Gounon (Netherlands) Lin Hodenius (Belgium) Maxime Martin | **(South Africa) Kelvin van der Linde** **(Italy) Valentino Rossi** **(Belgium) Charles Weerts** | (United States) Dustin Blattner (Germany) Dennis Marschall (Germany) Alfred Renauer | (Brazil) Oswaldo Negri Jr. (United States) Jay Schreibman (United States) Conrad Grunewald | Report |

== Championship standings ==
Scoring system

Championship points are awarded for the first ten positions in each race. Individual drivers are required to participate for a minimum of 40 minutes in order to earn championship points in any race. Race-by-race entries which only participated in either of the final two races of the season are not eligible for points.

Standard Points

| Position | 1st | 2nd | 3rd | 4th | 5th | 6th | 7th | 8th | 9th | 10th |
| Points | 25 | 18 | 15 | 12 | 10 | 8 | 6 | 4 | 2 | 1 |

Indianapolis Points

| Position | 1st | 2nd | 3rd | 4th | 5th | 6th | 7th | 8th | 9th | 10th |
| Points | 50 | 36 | 30 | 24 | 20 | 16 | 12 | 8 | 4 | 2 |

=== Drivers' championship ===
| Pos. | Driver | Team | SON | | COT | | SEB | | VIR | | ELK (Note: Race 1 was abandoned with 26 minutes to go due to weather conditions, half points were awarded.) | | BAR | | IND | Points |
| Pos. | Driver | Team | RD1 | RD2 | RD1 | RD2 | RD1 | RD2 | RD1 | RD2 | RD1 | RD2 | RD1 | RD2 | RDU | Points |
Pro class
| 1 | (United States) Connor De Phillippi (United States) Kenton Koch | (United States) Random Vandals Racing | 2^{PF} | 1^{PF} | 1^{F} | 16† | 1^{P} | 1^{PF} | 2^{P} | 3^{P} | 2^{F} | 2 | 1^{P} | 3^{F} | 4 | 283.5 |
| 2 | (Canada) Mikaël Grenier (United States) Michai Stephens | (Canada) JMF Motorsports | 1 | 3 | 2^{P} | 2^{PF} | 4 | 3 | 5 | 2 | 4^{P} | 1^{PF} | 2 | 1^{P} | 7 | 248.5 |
| 3 | (Belgium) Jan Heylen (United Kingdom) Alex Sedgwick | (United States) RS1 | 4 | 2 | 3 | 3 | 2^{F} | 2 | 1^{F} | 1^{F} | 5 | 3 | 4 | 2 | 5 | 236 |
| 4 | (United States) Bill Auberlen (United States) Varun Choksey | (United States) Random Vandals Racing | 3 | 4 | 14† | 15 | 3 | 4 | 11 | 6 | 3 | 4 | 3^{F} | 5 | 24†^{P} | 177 |
Drivers ineligible to score points
| – | (South Africa) Kelvin van der Linde (Italy) Valentino Rossi (Belgium) Charles Weerts | (Belgium) Team WRT | | | | | | | | | | | | | 1 | – |
| – | (Germany) Tom Kalender (Germany) Maro Engel (Germany) Luca Stolz | (Hong Kong) Mercedes-AMG Team GMR | | | | | | | | | | | | | 2 | – |
| – | (Brazil) Augusto Farfus (Switzerland) Raffaele Marciello (Oman) Al Faisal Al Zubair | (Belgium) Team WRT | | | | | | | | | | | | | 3^{F} | – |
| – | (United States) Conor Daly | (United States) Random Vandals Racing | | | | | | | | | | | | | 4 | – |
| – | (Belgium) Alessio Picariello | (United States) RS1 | | | | | | | | | | | | | 5 | – |
| – | (Australia) Kenny Habul (Australia) Chaz Mostert (Australia) Will Power | (Australia) 75 Express | | | | | | | | | | | | | 6 | – |
| – | (Austria) Lucas Auer | (Canada) JMF Motorsports | | | | | | | | | | | | | 7 | – |
| – | (Andorra) Jules Gounon (Netherlands) Lin Hodenius (Belgium) Maxime Martin | (United States) Mercedes-AMG Lone Star Racing | | | | | | | | | | | | | 21 | – |
| – | (Malaysia) Adrian D'Silva (Switzerland) Ricardo Feller (Germany) Sven Müller | (New Zealand) EBM | | | | | | | | | | | | | 23† | – |
| – | (Austria) Philipp Eng | (United States) Random Vandals Racing | | | | | | | | | | | | | 24†^{P} | – |
| – | (United States) Adam Adelson (Germany) Laurin Heinrich (United States) Elliott Skeer | (United States) Wright Motorsports | | | | | | | | | | | | | 25† | – |
Pro-Am class
| 1 | (United States) Robby Foley (United States) Justin Rothberg | (United States) Turner Motorsport | 5 | 7 | 5 | 7^{P} | 7 | 5^{P} | 3 | 4^{PF} | 11 | 6 | 5 | 8 | 10^{P} | 260 |
| 2 | (United Kingdom) Matt Bell (United States) Blake McDonald | (United States) DXDT Racing | 17 | 14 | 4^{F} | 5 | 5 | 7^{F} | 6 | 5 | 6 | 5^{P} | 6 | 4 | 22 | 195 |
| 3 | (United States) Jeff Burton (Switzerland) Philip Ellis | (United States) Regulator Racing | 11^{P} | 5 | 10^{P} | 1 | 6^{P} | 6 | 12^{PF} | 15† | 1^{PF} | 8 | 11^{PF} | 9 | 16^{F} | 156.5 |
| 4 | (United States) Gray Newell (United Kingdom) Darren Turner | (United States) Heart of Racing Team | 12 | 15 | 7 | 9 | 11 | 12 | 4 | 7 | 10 | 7 | 8 | 11 | 11 | 144 |
| 5 | (Australia) Tom Sargent (United States) Kyle Washington | (United States) GMG Racing | 13 | 13 | 6 | 6^{F} | 10 | 8 | 7 | 13† | 12 | 9 | 7 | 6^{PF} | 14 | 134 |
| 6 | (United States) Todd Coleman (United States) Aaron Telitz | (United States) Archangel Motorsports | 9 | 10 | 9 | 10 | 8^{F} | 9 | 10 | 14† | 14† | 12^{F} | 9 | 12 | 12 | 119 |
| 7 | (United States) Jason Daskalos (United States) Isaac Sherman | (United States) CRP Racing | 8 | 8 | 15 | 4 | 15 | 14 | 8 | 9 | 8 | 14† | 10 | 7 | | 96 |
| 8 | (Brazil) Marcelo Hahn | (Italy) AF Corse USA | 7 | 9 | 13 | 14 | | | 4 | 12 | 7 | 10 | 14 | 10 | 19 | 80.5 |
| 9 | (United States) Colin Braun (United States) George Kurtz | (United States) CrowdStrike Racing by Riley Motorsports | 6^{F} | 6^{PF} | | | | | | | | | | | 13 | 60 |
| 10 | (United States) Ross Chouest (Canada) Aaron Povoledo | (United States) Chouest Povoledo Racing | 15 | 12 | 11 | 17† | 13 | 13 | 13 | 8 | 9 | 13 | 15† | 14 | 20 | 53 |
| 11 | (Brazil) Allam Khodair | (Italy) AF Corse USA | 7 | 9 | 13 | 14 | | | | | | | | | 19 | 39 |
| 12 | (Brazil) Christian Hahn | (Italy) AF Corse USA | | | | | | | 4 | 12 | 7 | 10 | | | 19 | 37.5 |
| 13 | (United States) Jason Bell (United States) Michael Cooper | (United States) Racers Edge Motorsports | 10 | 16 | 8 | 11 | 14 | 10 | | | | | | | | 30 |
| 14 | (Canada) Jean-Frédéric Laberge (Canada) Kyle Marcelli | (Canada) LAB Motorsport by GT Racing | DNS | DNS | 12 | 8 | 9 | 15 | 16† | DNS | | | | | | 22 |
| 15 | (United States) Andy Lee (United States) Elias Sabo | (United States) Flying Lizard Motorsports | 14 | 11 | 17† | DNS | | | | | | | | | | 7 |
Drivers ineligible to score points
| – | (United States) Dustin Blattner (Germany) Dennis Marschall (Germany) Alfred Renauer | (Germany) Blattner Company by Herberth Motorsport | | | | | | | | | | | | | 8 | – |
| – | (Hong Kong) Antares Au (Netherlands) Loek Hartog (Switzerland) Patric Niederhauser | (United States) Wright Motorsports | | | | | | | | | | | | | 9 | – |
| – | (Brazil) Diego Gomes Nunes | (Italy) AF Corse USA | | | | | | | | | | | 14 | 10 | | – |
| – | (United States) Patrick Gallagher | (United States) Turner Motorsport | | | | | | | | | | | | | 10^{P} | – |
| – | (Canada) Zacharie Robichon | (United States) Heart of Racing Team | | | | | | | | | | | | | 11 | – |
| – | (United States) Thomas Merrill | (United States) Archangel Motorsports | | | | | | | | | | | | | 12 | – |
| – | (United Kingdom) Toby Sowery | (United States) CrowdStrike Racing by Riley Motorsports | | | | | | | | | | | | | 13 | – |
| – | (Austria) Klaus Bachler | (United States) GMG Racing | | | | | | | | | | | | | 14 | – |
| – | (Germany) Ralf Bohn (Switzerland) Rolf Ineichen (Germany) Robert Renauer | (Germany) Herberth Motorsport | | | | | | | | | | | | | 15 | – |
| – | (Netherlands) "Daan Arrow" | (United States) Regulator Racing | | | | | | | | | | | | | 16^{F} | – |
| – | (United States) Scott Dollahite (United States) Anthony Lazzaro | (United States) Dollahite Racing | 18 | 17 | | | | | | | | | | | | – |
| – | (Netherlands) Nicky Catsburg | (United States) Chouest Povoledo Racing | | | | | | | | | | | | | 20 | – |
| – | (United States) Alec Udell | (United States) DXDT Racing | | | | | | | | | | | | | 22 | – |
Am class
| 1 | (Brazil) Oswaldo Negri Jr. (United States) Jay Schreibman | (Italy) AF Corse USA | 16^{PF} | 18†^{PF} | 16^{PF} | 13^{F} | | | 9^{F} | 11^{PF} | 13 | 11^{PF} | 13^{F} | 15^{F} | 17^{F} | 259.5 |
| 2 | (United States) Scott Dollahite | (United States) Dollahite Racing | | | 18† | 12^{P} | 12^{PF} | 11^{PF} | 15†^{P} | 10 | 15†^{PF} | 15† | 12^{P} | 13^{P} | 18^{P} | 249 |
| 3 | (United States) Eric Powell | (United States) Dollahite Racing | | | | | | | 15† | 10 | 15†^{PF} | 15† | 12^{P} | 13^{P} | 18^{P} | 156 |
| 4 | (Italy) Stefano Gattuso | (United States) Dollahite Racing | | | | | 12^{PF} | 11^{PF} | | | | | | | 18^{P} | 86 |
| 5 | (United States) Anthony Lazzaro | (United States) Dollahite Racing | | | 18† | 12^{P} | | | | | | | | | | 43 |
Drivers ineligible to score points
| – | (United States) Conrad Grunewald | (Italy) AF Corse USA | | | | | | | | | | | | | 17^{F} | – |
| Pos. | Driver | Team | SON | | COT | | SEB | | VIR | | ELK | | BAR | | IND | Points |

Key
| Colour | Result |
|---|---|
| Gold | Race winner |
| Silver | 2nd place |
| Bronze | 3rd place |
| Green | Points finish |
| Blue | Non-points finish |
| Blue | Non-classified finish (NC) |
| Purple | Did not finish (Ret) |
| Black | Disqualified (DSQ) |
| Black | Excluded (EX) |
| White | Did not start (DNS) |
| White | Race cancelled (C) |
| White | Withdrew (WD) |
| Blank | Did not participate |

^{P} – Pole
^{F} – Fastest Lap

=== Teams' championship ===
| Pos. | Team | SON | | COT | | SEB | | VIR | | ELK | | BAR | | IND | Points |
| Pos. | Team | RD1 | RD2 | RD1 | RD2 | RD1 | RD2 | RD1 | RD2 | RD1 | RD2 | RD1 | RD2 | RDU | Points |
Pro class
| 1 | (United States) Random Vandals Racing | 2^{PF} | 1^{PF} | 1^{F} | 15 | 1^{P} | 1^{PF} | 2^{P} | 3^{P} | 2^{F} | 2 | 1^{PF} | 3^{F} | 4^{P} | 296.5 |
| 2 | (Canada) JMF Motorsports | 1 | 3 | 2^{P} | 2^{PF} | 4 | 3 | 5 | 2 | 4^{P} | 1^{PF} | 2 | 1^{P} | 7 | 253 |
| 3 | (United States) RS1 | 4 | 2 | 3 | 3 | 2^{F} | 2 | 1^{F} | 1^{F} | 5 | 3 | 4 | 2 | 5 | 243.5 |
Teams ineligible to score points
| – | (Belgium) Team WRT | | | | | | | | | | | | | 1^{F} | – |
| – | (Hong Kong) Mercedes-AMG Team GMR | | | | | | | | | | | | | 2 | – |
| – | (Australia) 75 Express | | | | | | | | | | | | | 6 | – |
| – | (United States) Mercedes-AMG Team Lone Star Racing | | | | | | | | | | | | | 21 | – |
| – | (Australia) EBM | | | | | | | | | | | | | 23 | – |
| – | (United States) Wright Motorsports | | | | | | | | | | | | | 25 | – |
Pro-Am class
| 1 | (United States) Turner Motorsport | 5 | 7 | 5 | 7^{P} | 7 | 5^{P} | 3 | 4^{PF} | 11 | 6 | 5 | 11 | 10^{P} | 260 |
| 2 | (United States) DXDT Racing | 17 | 14 | 4^{F} | 5 | 5 | 7^{F} | 6 | 5 | 6 | 5^{P} | 6 | 4 | 22 | 195 |
| 3 | (United States) Regulator Racing | 11^{P} | 5 | 10^{P} | 1 | 6^{P} | 6 | 12^{PF} | 15† | 1^{PF} | 8 | 11^{PF} | 12 | 16^{F} | 156.5 |
| 4 | (United States) Heart of Racing Team | 12 | 15 | 7 | 9 | 11 | 12 | 4 | 7 | 10 | 7 | 8 | 9 | 11 | 144 |
| 5 | (United States) GMG Racing | 13 | 13 | 6 | 6^{F} | 10 | 8 | 7 | 13† | 12 | 9 | 7 | 6^{PF} | 14 | 134 |
| 6 | (United States) Archangel Motorsports | 9 | 10 | 9 | 10 | 8^{F} | 9 | 10 | 14† | 14† | 12^{F} | 9 | 10 | 12 | 119 |
| 7 | (United States) CRP Racing | 8 | 8 | 15 | 4 | 15 | 14 | 8 | 9 | 8 | 14† | 10 | 7 | | 96 |
| 8 | (Italy) AF Corse USA | 7 | 9 | 13 | 14 | | | 4 | 12 | 7 | 10 | 14 | 8 | 19 | 80.5 |
| 9 | (United States) CrowdStrike Racing by Riley Motorsports | 6^{F} | 6^{PF} | | | | | | | | | | | 13 | 60 |
| 10 | (United States) Chouest Povoledo Racing | 15 | 12 | 11 | 17† | 13 | 13 | 13 | 8 | 9 | 13 | 15 | 14 | 20 | 53 |
| 11 | (United States) Racers Edge Motorsports | 10 | 16 | 8 | 11 | 14 | 10 | | | | | | | | 30 |
| 12 | (Canada) LAB Motorsport by GT Racing | DNS | DNS | 12 | 8 | 9 | 15 | 16† | DNS | | | | | | 22 |
| 13 | (United States) Flying Lizard Motorsports | 14 | 11 | 17† | DNS | | | | | | | | | | 7 |
| 14 | (United States) Dollahite Racing | 18 | 17 | | | | | | | | | | | | 0 |
Teams ineligible to score points
| – | (Germany) Blattner Company by Herberth Motorsport | | | | | | | | | | | | | 8 | – |
| – | (United States) Wright Motorsports | | | | | | | | | | | | | 9 | – |
| – | (Germany) Herberth Motorsport | | | | | | | | | | | | | 15 | – |
Am class
| 1 | (Italy) AF Corse USA | 16^{PF} | 18†^{PF} | 16^{PF} | 13^{F} | | | 9^{F} | 11^{PF} | 13^{F} | 11^{PF} | 13^{F} | 15^{F} | 17^{F} | 259.5 |
| 2 | (United States) Dollahite Racing | | | 18† | 12^{P} | 12^{PF} | 11^{PF} | 15†^{P} | 10 | 15†^{P} | 15† | 12^{P} | 13^{P} | 18^{P} | 249 |
| Pos. | Team | SON | | COT | | SEB | | VIR | | ELK | | BAR | | IND | Points |

Notes

- † – Drivers did not finish the race but were classified, as they had started the race.

== See also ==
- 2025 GT World Challenge Europe
- 2025 GT World Challenge Europe Endurance Cup
- 2025 GT World Challenge Europe Sprint Cup
- 2025 GT World Challenge Asia
- 2025 GT World Challenge Australia
