= Johnny O'Connell =

American racing driver

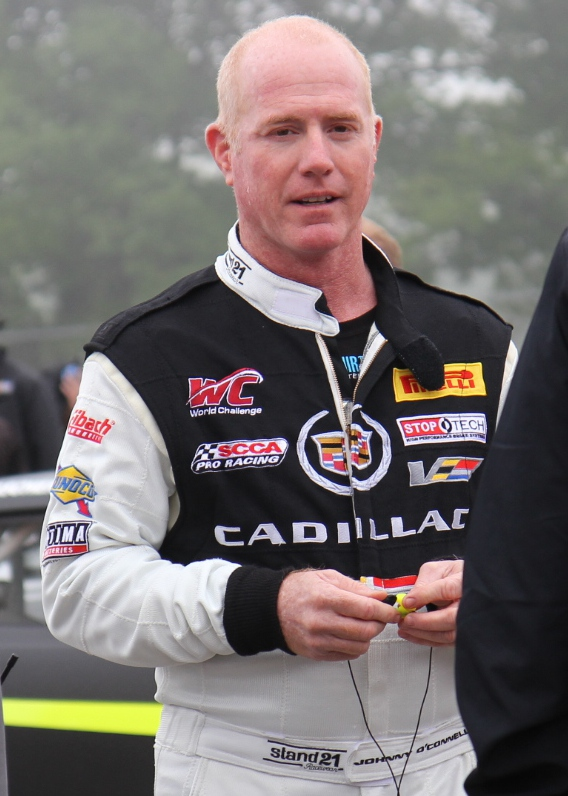
- O'Connell at Road America in 2014
- Nationality: (United States) American
- Born: John Chandler O'Connell; July 24, 1962 (age 64) Poughkeepsie, New York, U.S.
- Categorisation: FIA Platinum (until 2015); FIA Gold (2016–2017); FIA Silver (2018–2022); FIA Bronze (2023–)

NASCAR O'Reilly Auto Parts Series career
- 1 race run over 1 year
- 2013 position: 65th
- Best finish: 65th (2013)
- First race: 2013 Johnsonville Sausage 200 (Road America)
Wins	Top tens	Poles
0	0	0

IndyCar Series career
- 4 races run over 2 years
- Best finish: 9th (1996)
- First race: 1996 Indy 200 (Orlando)
- Last race: 1996-97 Las Vegas 500K (Las Vegas)
Wins	Podiums	Poles
0	0	0
- Statistics up to date as of November 16, 2013.

24 Hours of Le Mans career
- Years: 1994, 1998–2010, 2016
- Teams: Clayton Cunningham Racing, Panoz Motorsports, Corvette Racing, Team AAI
- Best finish: 5th (1994, 2000)
- Class wins: 4 (1994, 2001, 2002, 2009)

John Chandler O'Connell (born July 24, 1962) is a racing driver from the United States. He currently drives for Cadillac in the Pirelli World Challenge, winning the 2012, 2013, 2014 and 2015 GT driver's championship.

== Career ==
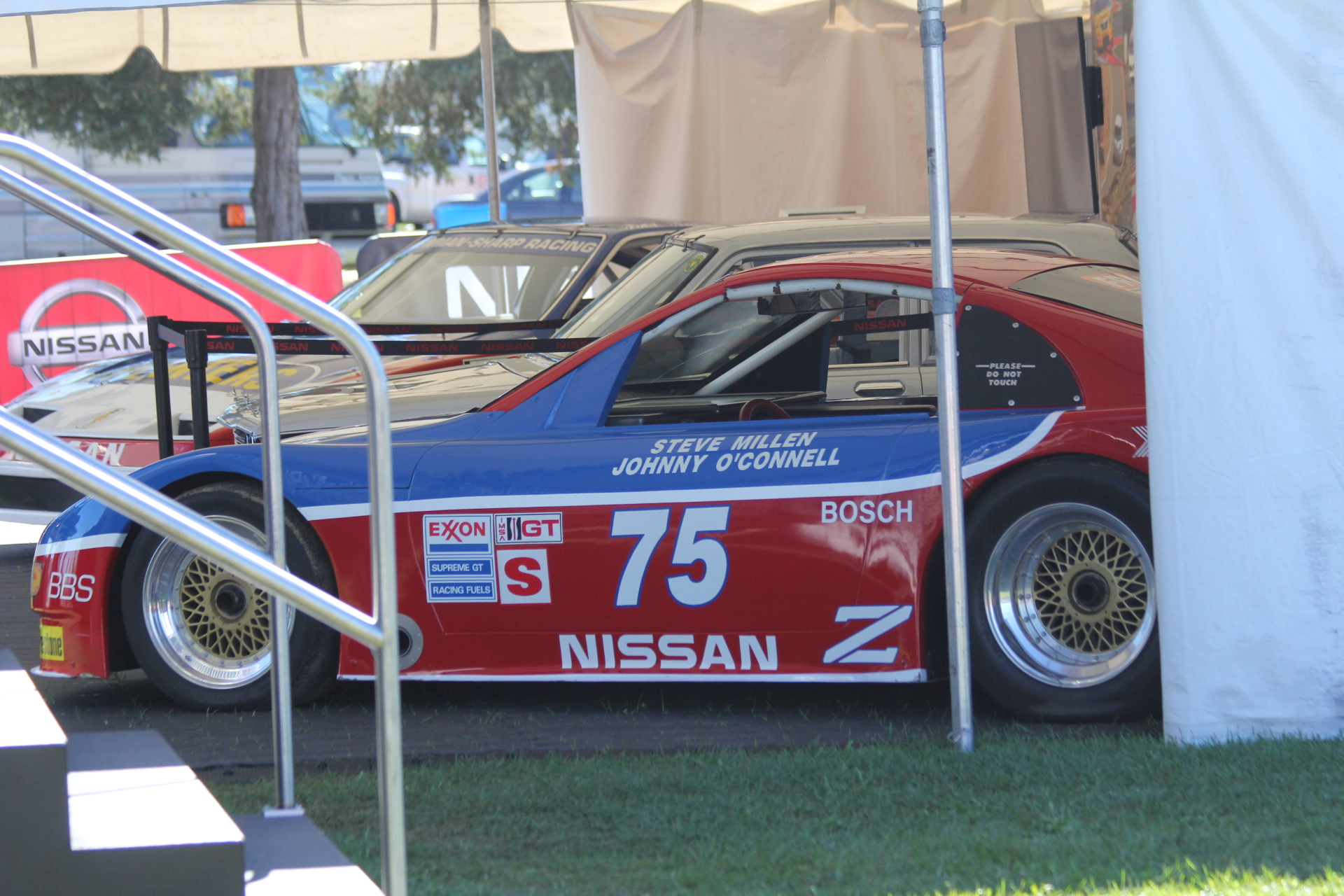
1990s IMSA car

Born in Poughkeepsie, New York, O'Connell started racing in the Formula Atlantic series in 1987, winning the Championship and Rookie of the Year. He also spent 1996 in the Indy Racing League, racing in the Indianapolis 500 and finishing in the top-ten in half of his four starts. He has seven class wins in the 12 Hours of Sebring, more than any other driver, and an overall title in 1994 when racing for Nissan. Driving for Corvette Racing, he has also won a number of class victories at the 24 Hours of Le Mans and the 24 Hours of Daytona. With his teammate Ron Fellows, he won the 2003 GTS class driver's championship.

O'Connell was also featured in Chevy's 2007, Super Bowl ad, "Ain't We Got Love" also featuring Mary J. Blige, rapper T.I., Big & Rich, and Dale Earnhardt Jr.

In 2013, O'Connell competed in the Johnsonville Sausage 200 at Road America in the NASCAR Nationwide Series for JR Motorsports, driving the No. 5 Chevrolet Camaro; he finished 12th in the event.

In 2023, O'Connell announced his return to racing in the GT America Series after being reclassified as a bronze driver due to his age. He won the 2024 GT America Series in an Audi R8 LMS GT3.

== Motorsports career results ==
=== NASCAR ===
(key) (Bold – Pole position awarded by qualifying time. Italics – Pole position earned by points standings or practice time. * – Most laps led.)

==== Nationwide Series ====
NASCAR Nationwide Series results
Year	Team	No.	Make	1	2	3	4	5	6	7	8	9	10	11	12	13	14	15	16	17	18	19	20	21	22	23	24	25	26	27	28	29	30	31	32	33	NNSC	Pts	Ref
2013	JR Motorsports	5	Chevy	DAY	PHO	LVS	BRI	CAL	TEX	RCH	TAL	DAR	CLT	DOV	IOW	MCH	ROA; 12	KEN	DAY	NHA	CHI	IND	IOW	GLN	MOH	BRI	ATL	RCH	CHI	KEN	DOV	KAN	CLT	TEX	PHO	HOM	65th	32	

^{1} Ineligible for series points

=== 24 Hours of Le Mans results ===
Year	Team	Co-Drivers	Car	Class	Laps	Pos.	Class Pos.
1994	(United States) Clayton Cunningham Racing	(New Zealand) Steve Millen (United States) John Morton	Nissan 300ZX Turbo	IMSA; GTS	317	5th	**1st**
1998	(United States) Panoz Motorsports (France) DAMS	(France) Éric Bernard (France) Christophe Tinseau	Panoz Esperante GTR-1	GT1	236	DNF	DNF
1999	(United States) Panoz Motorsports	(Denmark) Jan Magnussen (Italy) Max Angelelli	Panoz LMP-1 Roadster-S; Ford	LMP	323	11th	9th
2000	(United States) Panoz Motorsports	(Japan) Hiroki Katoh (France) Pierre-Henri Raphanel	Panoz LMP-1 Roadster-S-Élan	LMP900	342	5th	5th
2001	(United States) Corvette Racing	(Canada) Ron Fellows (United States) Scott Pruett	Chevrolet Corvette C5-R	GTS	278	8th	**1st**
2002	(United States) Corvette Racing	(Canada) Ron Fellows (United Kingdom) Oliver Gavin	Chevrolet Corvette C5-R	GTS	335	11th	**1st**
2003	(United States) Corvette Racing	(Canada) Ron Fellows (France) Franck Fréon	Chevrolet Corvette C5-R	GTS	326	12th	**3rd**
2004	(United States) Corvette Racing	(Canada) Ron Fellows (Italy) Max Papis	Chevrolet Corvette C5-R	GTS	334	8th	**2nd**
2005	(United States) Corvette Racing	(Canada) Ron Fellows (Italy) Max Papis	Chevrolet Corvette C6.R	GT1	347	6th	**2nd**
2006	(United States) Corvette Racing	(Canada) Ron Fellows (Italy) Max Papis	Chevrolet Corvette C6.R	GT1	327	12th	7th
2007	(United States) Corvette Racing	(Denmark) Jan Magnussen (Canada) Ron Fellows	Chevrolet Corvette C6.R	GT1	342	6th	**2nd**
2008	(United States) Corvette Racing	(Denmark) Jan Magnussen (Canada) Ron Fellows	Chevrolet Corvette C6.R	GT1	344	14th	**2nd**
2009	(United States) Corvette Racing	(Denmark) Jan Magnussen (Spain) Antonio García	Chevrolet Corvette C6.R	GT1	342	15th	**1st**
2010	(United States) Corvette Racing	(Denmark) Jan Magnussen (Spain) Antonio García	Chevrolet Corvette C6.R	GT2	225	DNF	DNF
2016	(Taiwan) Team AAI	(United Kingdom) Oliver Bryant (United States) Mark Patterson	Chevrolet Corvette C7.R	GTE; Am	306	39th	9th

=== Indy Racing League results ===
(key) (Races in bold indicate pole position)

Year	Team	Chassis	No.	Engine	1	2	3	4	5	6	7	8	9	10	Rank	Points	Ref
1996	Cunningham Racing	Lola T941 Reynard 95i2	75	Ford XB V8t	WDW; 7	PHX; 5	INDY; 29								**9th**	**192**	
1996–97	Treadway Racing	Reynard 95i	10	Ford XB V8t	NHA; Wth										**40th**	**23**	
1996–97	Treadway Racing	Reynard 94i	6	Ford XB V8t		LVS; 12	WDW	PHX							**40th**	**23**	
1996–97	A. J. Foyt Enterprises	G-Force GF01	1	Oldsmobile Aurora V8					INDY; DNQ	TXS	PPIR	CLT	NHA	LVS	**40th**	**23**	

=== Indianapolis 500 results ===
Year	Chassis	Engine	Start	Finish	Team
1996	Reynard	Ford-Cosworth	29th	29th	Byrd-Cunningham Racing

Sporting positions
Preceded by Ted Prappas	North American Formula Atlantic; Pacific Division Champion; 1987	Succeeded by Dean Hall
