= George Kurtz =

American businessman and racing driver (born 1970)

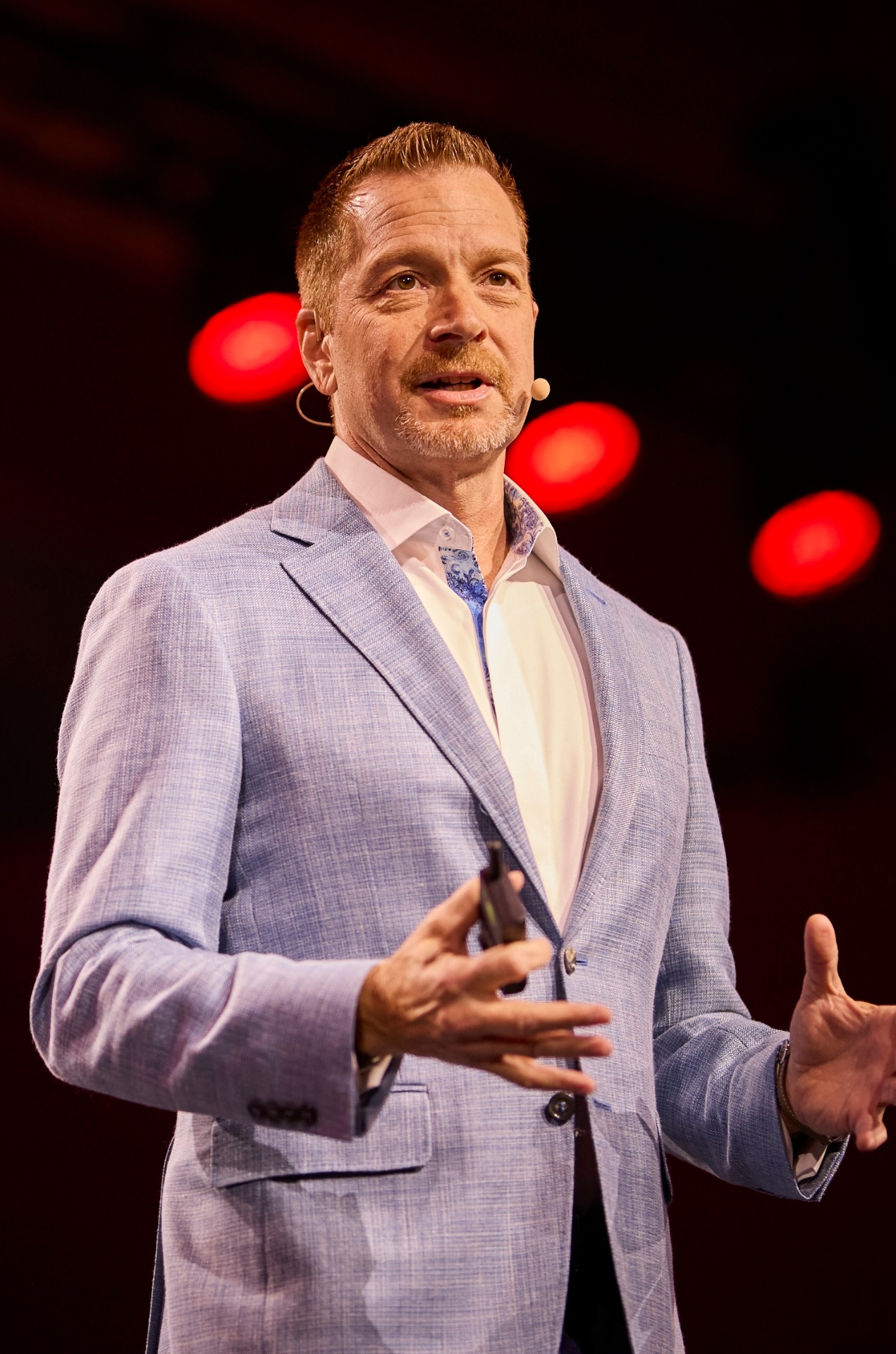
- Born: October 14, 1970 (age 56); New Jersey, U.S.
- Education: Seton Hall University (BS)
- Occupations: CEO of CrowdStrike; Co-owner and strategic advisor of Mercedes-AMG Petronas Formula One Team; Racing driver
- Categorisation: FIA Bronze
- Spouse: Anna Kurtz
- Children: 2
- Awards: 2023 Jim Trueman Award
- Website: https://georgekurtz.com/

George Kurtz (born October 14, 1970) is an American entrepreneur, businessman and racing driver. He is a co-founder and chief executive officer of CrowdStrike, a cybersecurity technology company. Kurtz also co-owns the Mercedes-AMG Petronas Formula One Team, serving as a technology adviser and steering-committee member.

Before founding CrowdStrike, he founded Foundstone, a security products and anti-virus software company, and became chief technology officer of McAfee after it acquired Foundstone in 2004. He has made a number of contributions to cybersecurity, including creating the field of vulnerability management; defining terminology, workflows, and services that remain central to cybersecurity; and leading an industry shift toward cloud-based cybersecurity architectures. Kurtz is co-author of Hacking Exposed: Network Security Secrets & Solutions, a book covering network security, vulnerability assessment, and penetration testing techniques. In 2024, Fortune magazine named Kurtz one of the "100 Most Powerful People in Business".

Kurtz owns and develops real estate projects in Scottsdale, Arizona, and elsewhere in the southwestern United States.

Kurtz is a FIA Bronze-rated race car driver who has won the Pro-Am class in the 24 Hours of Le Mans and the 24 Hours of Spa. He is also the 2026 IMSA SportsCar LMP2 class champion.

== Early life and education ==
Kurtz grew up in Parsippany–Troy Hills, New Jersey, and attended Parsippany High School. Kurtz has said that he started programming video games on his Commodore when he was in fourth grade. He went on to build bulletin board systems in high school.

Kurtz received a Bachelor of Science with a major in accounting from the private Seton Hall University in South Orange, New Jersey.

== Career ==
=== Price Waterhouse and Ernst & Young ===
After college, Kurtz began his career at Price Waterhouse as a Certified Public Accountant. In 1993, he became a member of the firm's new security division as cybersecurity grew in importance. Kurtz conducted penetration testing, a then-new approach to finding vulnerabilities in corporate network infrastructure. He later joined Ernst & Young, where he continued penetration testing and helped develop internet security protocols and practices that remain part of the cybersecurity field. After a few years at Ernst & Young, Kurtz left to start his first company.

=== Foundstone ===
In 1999, Kurtz launched Foundstone to offer cybersecurity products and services, a novel pairing at the time. The company competed against Internet Security Systems, which was later acquired by IBM.

Frustrated with time-consuming and incomplete vulnerability assessment technologies, Kurtz pioneered vulnerability management, creating both the category and term. His company also pioneered professional training in penetration testing and vulnerability management. The training was based on Hacking Exposed, a book about cybersecurity for network administrators that he co-wrote in 1999 with Stuart McClure and Joel Scambray. The book has sold more than 600,000 copies and been translated into more than 30 languages. The training helped create a global community of cybersecurity professionals well-versed on the new domain of vulnerability management.

Kurtz was recognized in Fast Company's inaugural "Fast 50" list for his innovative work at Foundstone.

=== McAfee ===
In August 2004, Kurtz sold Foundstone to McAfee, where he became Senior Vice President and General Manager of Risk Management. He was promoted to Executive Vice President and Chief Technology Officer (CTO) in October 2009, overseeing the company's technology strategy and innovation efforts. As CTO, Kurtz was involved in McAfee's response to major cybersecurity incidents, including 2010's Operation Aurora, which attacked on Google and other organizations. He also led research into cyber threats such as Night Dragon and Shady RAT. After Intel acquired McAfee in 2011, Kurtz left the company to start his own firm.

=== CrowdStrike ===
==== Founding and early years ====
In November 2011, Kurtz joined private equity firm Warburg Pincus as an "entrepreneur-in-residence" where he began developing the concept for a new cybersecurity venture. In February 2012, he, Gregg Marston, and Dmitri Alperovitch co-founded CrowdStrike in Irvine, California, with $25 million in initial funding from Warburg Pincus. Kurtz served as CEO. The following year, the company launched its flagship product, Falcon, which offered a new approach to cybersecurity: a cloud-native, intelligence-driven model intended to shift away from traditional on-premise solutions and reduce the performance impact on client systems. In 2013, CrowdStrike appeared on the MIT Tech Review's 50 Disruptive Companies list. In 2015, the ISSA President's Award for Public Service was awarded to Kurtz for contributions to the cybersecurity community.

==== Growth and impact ====
Headquartered in Austin, Texas, with offices in Sunnyvale, California, and operations worldwide, CrowdStrike grew quickly. In 2017, Kurtz was named one of 34 regional EY Entrepreneurs of the Year for building CrowdStrike. In 2019, the company held its initial public offering (IPO) on the Nasdaq stock exchange, reaching a valuation of about $6.6 billion.

A July 2020 report by IDC called CrowdStrike the fastest-growing vendor in the market. In 2021, the company was ranked No. 4 on Inc. Magazine's inaugural list of the 250 Best-Led Companies. In 2024, CrowdStrike was added to the S&P 500 index, becoming the fastest cybersecurity company to join the index. That year, Cybercrime Magazine named Kurtz its "Cybersecurity Person of the Year". Kurtz's total compensation for 2024 was $47 million, an increase of 29 percent over the previous year.

CrowdStrike has been recognized for its innovation in the cybersecurity industry, particularly in endpoint security. In March 2020, Andrew Nowinski, an analyst at D.A. Davidson & Co., said CrowdStrike offered a leading solution in the field. In 2023 and 2024, the company's AI-powered threat detection and response products were said to advance the fields of threat hunting and automated security. The company's subscription-based approach to cybersecurity has been compared to Salesforce's model in customer relationship management and ServiceNow's role in IT service management.

==== 2024 outage ====
In July 2024, CrowdStrike released a software update that disrupted millions of Microsoft Windows systems, an event that has been described as the largest outage in the history of information technology. As chief executive officer, Kurtz publicly apologized for the incident and said the company would work to restore affected systems and change its internal development and testing processes to prevent more such failures. Media coverage noted that Kurtz had also been involved a 2010 McAfee software update that caused widespread disruption.

== Investments ==
Kurtz has invested in emerging-technology and cybersecurity startups, including Lovable, which makes an AI-assisted software development platform; 1Password, which makes an enterprise password and identity-management platform; Armadin, which he joined in 2026 as a board member; Doppel, a cybersecurity company that focuses on AI-enabled social-engineering attacks; Grip Security, which makes a SaaS security platform; Aryon Security, a cloud security enforcement platform that enables proactive cloud risk prevention; and VISO TRUST, which makes a third-party risk-management product for vendors.

== Real estate holdings ==
Since 2019, Kurtz has been developing real estate in the Southwestern United States.

=== The Parque ===
Kurtz purchased the site of Cracker Jax, an amusement park and driving range in Scottsdale, Arizona, and submitted plans in 2023 to turn the area into "The Parque", a 2-million-square-foot mixed-use campus with residential units, an office building, restaurants, retail space, a hotel, and a 2-acre green space. Despite some community opposition, the Scottsdale City Council voted 5-2 to approve the project.

=== The Promenade ===
Kurtz owns The Promenade, a shopping center in Scottsdale, where he has made environmental improvements. The 730,000-square foot center has a spire designed by Frank Lloyd Wright.

=== Scottsdale Quarter ===
Kurtz's FalconEye Ventures acquired Scottsdale Quarter in 2025, a 755,000-square-foot mixed-use property in Scottsdale. Plans include a $100 million upgrade to improve its luxury retail, office, and residential offerings.

== Racing career ==
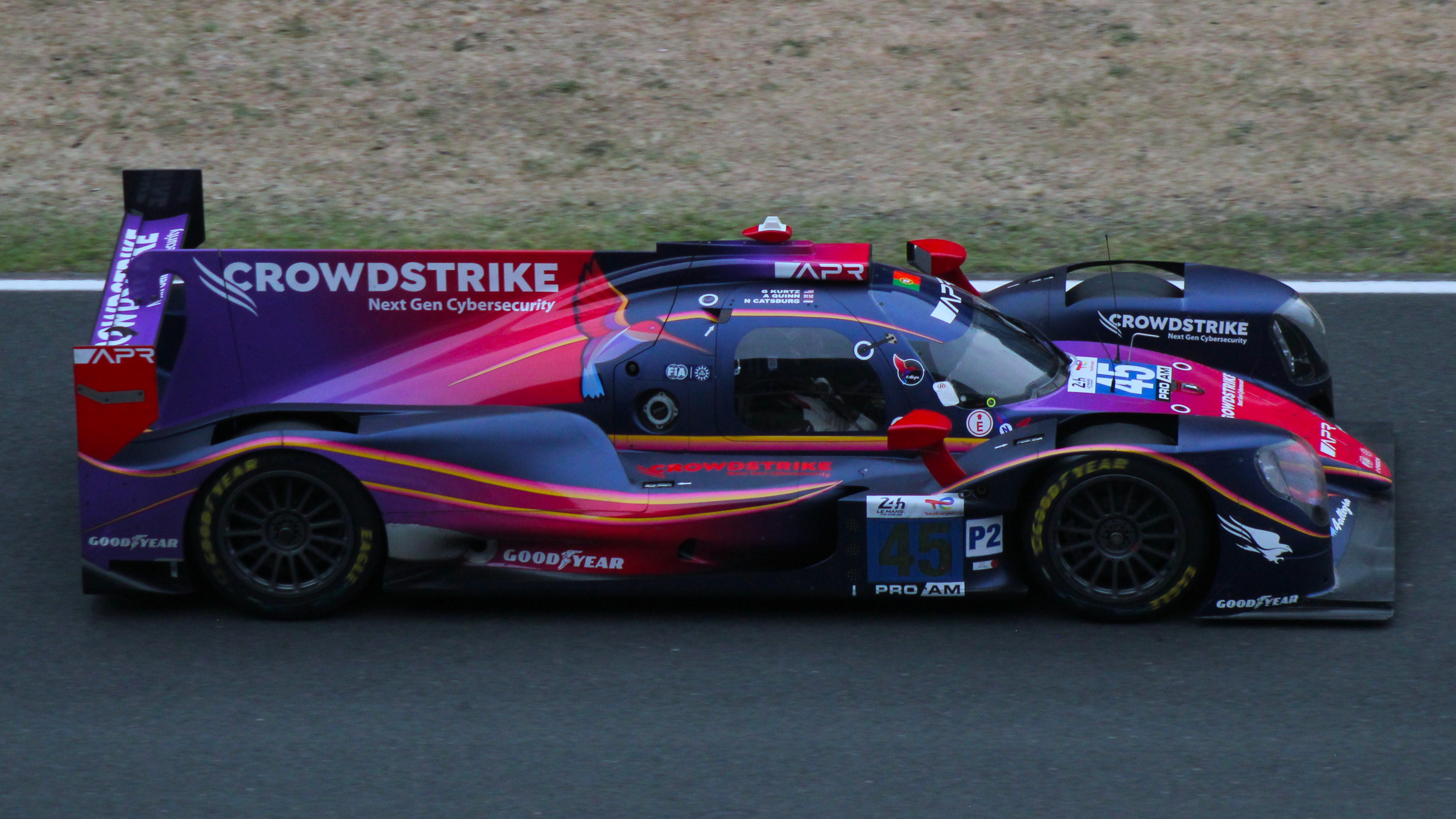
Kurtz's No. 45 car at the 2025 24 Hours of Le Mans

In 2016, Kurtz made his racing debut in the Pirelli World Challenge, driving an Aston Martin Vantage GT4 for TRG-AMR. He remained in the series for the following two years, winning the GTS Am class in 2017 at the wheel of a McLaren 570S GT4. In 2019, the championship was renamed the GT World Challenge America, which Kurtz contested with pro driver Colin Braun in the GT3 category. The duo finished fifth in the Pro-Am standings. The duo reunited in 2020, when Kurtz made eight podiums, including his first overall win in GT3 machinery at Virginia International Raceway and another victory, to finish as the runner-up of Pro-Am.

In 2021, Kurtz again raced in the GTWC America series but also in prototype cars, competing in a Ligier JS P320 in the IMSA SportsCar Championship's LMP3 category. In that series, he competed solely in the endurance events, winning at Sebring and scoring a class podium at Watkins Glen. Three missed weekends in the former series dropped Kurtz and Braun to sixth in the drivers' standings, with two class wins.

In 2022, Kurtz remained in both championships, scoring two podiums in IMSA, including third place in class at the 24 Hours of Daytona. In GTWC America, he won ten of 16 races, earning the title in the SRO3 class.

In 2023, Kurtz stepped up to the LMP2 category to compete full-time in the IMSA SCC, driving for his own Crowdstrike team supported by Algarve Pro Racing alongside Ben Hanley, with silver-ranked Nolan Siegel supporting the pair at the endurance rounds. Kurtz and Hanley won at the season-ending Petit Le Mans and another race, but finished second in the standings, edged out by Paul-Loup Chatin and Ben Keating. In the Michelin Endurance Trophy, which took into account placings solely within the four endurance races, the Kurtz-Hanley combo came out on top. Kurtz also made his debut at the 24 Hours of Le Mans, where he, Colin Braun, and James Allen won in the LMP2 Pro-Am subclass. Finally, he returned to the GTWC America to defend his title, and although Kurtz only finished third in the SRO3 category he claimed Pro-Am honours, having partnered with Braun throughout the year. During the 2023–24 winter, Kurtz and Braun raced in the Asian Le Mans Series, where they and young pro Malthe Jakobsen won two races on their way to the championship.

Following the 2024 CrowdStrike incident, Kurtz withdrew from racing for the season; he returned to motorsport for the 2025 24 Hours of Daytona.

=== Mercedes-AMG Petronas Formula One Team ===
In 2025, Kurtz became a co-owner of the Mercedes-AMG Petronas Formula One Team through a minority investment in an ownership entity controlled by team principal Toto Wolff. As part of the arrangement, he joined the team's strategic steering committee and serves as a technology adviser, contributing expertise in data security, systems resilience, and large-scale digital infrastructure.

=== Record ===
==== Complete WeatherTech SportsCar Championship results ====
(key) (Races in bold indicate pole position; results in italics indicate fastest lap)

| Year | Team | Class | Make | Engine | 1 | 2 | 3 | 4 | 5 | 6 | 7 | Pos. | Points |
|---|---|---|---|---|---|---|---|---|---|---|---|---|---|
| 2021 | CORE Autosport | LMP3 | Ligier JS P320 | Nissan VK56DE 5.6 L V8 | DAY; 5† | SEB; 1 | MDO | WGL; 2 | WGL | ELK | PET; 7 | 11th | 968 |
| 2022 | CORE Autosport | LMP3 | Ligier JS P320 | Nissan VK56DE 5.6 L V8 | DAY; 3† | SEB; 5 | MDO | WGL; 2 | MOS | ELK | PET; 5 | 17th | 921 |
| 2023 | CrowdStrike Racing by APR | LMP2 | Oreca 07 | Gibson GK428 4.2 L V8 | DAY; 2† | SEB; 5 | MON; 3 | WGL; 1 | **ELK**; 7 | IMS; 3 | PET; 1 | 2nd | 1958 |
| 2024 | CrowdStrike Racing by APR | LMP2 | Oreca 07 | Gibson GK428 4.2 L V8 | DAY; 2 | SEB; 9 | WGL; 13 | MOS; 7 | ELK | IMS | ATL | 24th | 1065 |
| 2025 | CrowdStrike Racing by APR | LMP2 | Oreca 07 | Gibson GK428 4.2 L V8 | DAY; 6 | SEB; 6 | WGL; 3 | MOS; 11 | ELK; 6 | IMS; 10 | ATL; 10 | 8th | 1836 |
| 2026 | CrowdStrike Racing by APR | LMP2 | Oreca 07 | Gibson GK428 4.2 L V8 | DAY; 1 | SEB; 5 | WGL; 2 | MOS; 2 | ELK; 2 | IMS; 9 | PET; 1 | 1st | 2322 |

^{†} Points only counted towards the Michelin Endurance Cup, and not the overall LMP2 Championship. ^{†} Points only counted towards the Michelin Endurance Cup, and not the overall LMP3 Championship.

==== Complete 24 Hours of Daytona results ====
| Year | Team | Co-Drivers | Car | Class | Laps | Pos. | Class Pos. |
|---|---|---|---|---|---|---|---|
| 2021 | (United States) CORE Autosport | (United States) Jon Bennett (United States) Colin Braun (United States) Matt McMurry | Ligier JS P320 | LMP3 | 737 | 31st | 5th |
| 2022 | (United States) CORE Autosport | (United States) Jon Bennett (United States) Colin Braun (Sweden) Niclas Jönsson | Ligier JS P320 | LMP3 | 721 | 16th | **3rd** |
| 2023 | (United States) CrowdStrike Racing by APR | (Mexico) Esteban Gutiérrez (United Kingdom) Ben Hanley (United States) Matt McMurry | Oreca 07 | LMP2 | 761 | 8th | **2nd** |
| 2024 | (United States) CrowdStrike Racing by APR | (United States) Colin Braun (Denmark) Malthe Jakobsen (United Kingdom) Toby Sowery | Oreca 07 | LMP2 | 767 | 10th | **2nd** |
| 2026 | (United States) CrowdStrike Racing by APR | (United Kingdom) Alex Quinn (Denmark) Malthe Jakobsen (United Kingdom) Toby Sowery | Oreca 07 | LMP2 | 686 | 10th | **1st** |

==== 24 Hours of Le Mans results ====
| Year | Team | Co-Drivers | Car | Class | Laps | Pos. | Class Pos. |
|---|---|---|---|---|---|---|---|
| 2023 | (Portugal) Algarve Pro Racing | (Australia) James Allen (United States) Colin Braun | Oreca 07-Gibson | LMP2 | 322 | 20th | 10th |
| 2023 | (Portugal) Algarve Pro Racing | (Australia) James Allen (United States) Colin Braun | Oreca 07-Gibson | LMP2 Pro-Am | 322 | 20th | **1st** |
| 2024 | (Portugal) CrowdStrike Racing by APR | (United States) Colin Braun (Netherlands) Nicky Catsburg | Oreca 07-Gibson | LMP2 | 149 | DNF | DNF |
| 2024 | (Portugal) CrowdStrike Racing by APR | (United States) Colin Braun (Netherlands) Nicky Catsburg | Oreca 07-Gibson | LMP2 Pro-Am | 149 | DNF | DNF |
| 2025 | (Portugal) Algarve Pro Racing | (Netherlands) Nicky Catsburg (United Kingdom) Alex Quinn | Oreca 07-Gibson | LMP2 | 362 | 30th | 13th |
| 2025 | (Portugal) Algarve Pro Racing | (Netherlands) Nicky Catsburg (United Kingdom) Alex Quinn | Oreca 07-Gibson | LMP2 Pro-Am | 362 | 30th | 8th |
| 2026 | (United States) CrowdStrike Racing by APR | (Germany) Laurin Heinrich (United Kingdom) Alex Quinn | Oreca 07-Gibson | LMP2 | 358 | 21st | 7th |
| 2026 | (United States) CrowdStrike Racing by APR | (Germany) Laurin Heinrich (United Kingdom) Alex Quinn | Oreca 07-Gibson | LMP2 Pro-Am | 358 | 21st | **1st** |

Sporting positions
| Preceded by Mikkel Jensen; Ben Keating; Scott Huffaker | Michelin Endurance Cup; LMP2 Champion; 2023; With: Ben Hanley | Succeeded by Incumbent |
