= 2025 Bathurst 12 Hour =

Endurance race in Australia

(Australia) 2025 Bathurst 12 Hour
Event Information
- Round 1 of 5 in the 2025
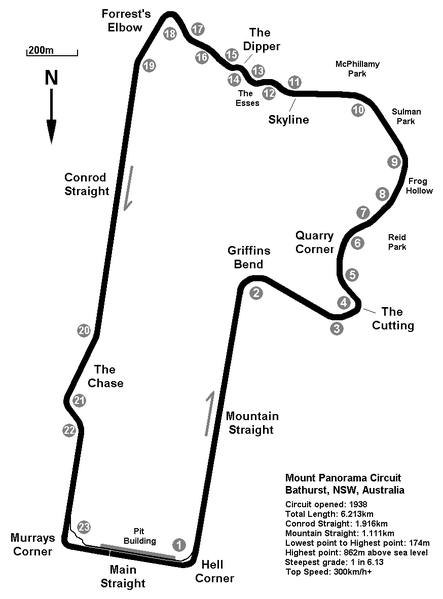
- Date: 31 January – 2 February 2025
- Location: Bathurst, New South Wales, Australia
- Venue: Mount Panorama Circuit

Results
Race 1
| Distance | 306 laps | 1901.178 km |
| Pole position | (Austria) Lucas Auer; Mercedes-AMG Team Craft-Bamboo Racing | 2:01.2760 |
| Winner | (Brazil) Augusto Farfus (South Africa) Kelvin van der Linde (South Africa) Sheldon van der Linde; Team WRT | 12:01:53.1350 |

The 2025 Bathurst 12 Hour (commercially titled 2025 Meguiar's Bathurst 12 Hour) was an endurance race for FIA GT3 cars and invited vehicles, staged at the Mount Panorama Circuit, Bathurst, New South Wales, Australia on 2 February 2025. It was the opening round of the 2025 Intercontinental GT Challenge.

After 1 year of being sponsored by Repco brand, the race was sponsored by the Meguiar's brand, through a partnership with Australian distributor MotorActive.

== Entry list ==
=== Class structure ===
Entries were divided into classes based on car type and driver ratings.

- Class A – GT3 (Current Specification FIA GT3 cars)
  - Pro – No Driver Restrictions
  - Pro-Am – For driving combinations featuring two FIA Platinum, FIA Gold, or FIA Silver and one or two FIA Bronze related drivers.
  - Silver Cup – for driving combinations featuring only FIA Silver and Bronze drivers
  - Bronze – for driving combinations featuring only FIA Bronze drivers
- Class B – GT Cup class
  - Class for Porsche GT3 Cup and other GTC cars from One-make racing series.
- Class C – GT4 (Current Specification SRO GT4 cars)
- Class I – Invitational class
  - For MARC cars, SRO GT2 cars and other special GT cars.

=== Entries ===
| No. | Entrant | Car | Driver 1 | Driver 2 | Driver 3 | Driver 4 |
Class A (GT3 Pro) (9 entries)
| 26 | (Australia) Arise Racing GT | Ferrari 296 GT3 | (Australia) Will Brown | (Australia) Chaz Mostert | (Brazil) Daniel Serra | |
| 32 | (Belgium) Team WRT | BMW M4 GT3 | (Brazil) Augusto Farfus | (South Africa) Kelvin van der Linde | (South Africa) Sheldon van der Linde | |
| 46 | (Belgium) Team WRT | BMW M4 GT3 | (Switzerland) Raffaele Marciello | (Italy) Valentino Rossi | (Belgium) Charles Weerts | |
| 75 | (Australia) 75 Express | Mercedes-AMG GT3 Evo | (Andorra) Jules Gounon | (Australia) Kenny Habul | (Germany) Luca Stolz | |
| 77 | (Hong Kong) Mercedes-AMG Team Craft-Bamboo Racing | Mercedes-AMG GT3 Evo | (Austria) Lucas Auer | (Germany) Maximilian Götz | (Australia) Jayden Ojeda | |
| 183 | (Australia) Jamec Racing | Audi R8 LMS Evo II | (Australia) Broc Feeney | (Switzerland) Ricardo Feller | (Australia) Liam Talbot | |
| 222 | (Australia) Scott Taylor Motorsport | Mercedes-AMG GT3 Evo | (Australia) Craig Lowndes | (Australia) Thomas Randle | (Australia) Cameron Waters | |
| 888 | (Hong Kong) Mercedes-AMG Team GMR | Mercedes-AMG GT3 Evo | (Germany) Maro Engel | (Canada) Mikaël Grenier | (Belgium) Maxime Martin | |
| 911 | (China) Absolute Racing | Porsche 911 GT3 R (992) | (Australia) Matt Campbell | (Turkey) Ayhancan Güven | (Belgium) Alessio Picariello | |
Class A (GT3 Silver) (3 entries)
| 14 | (Australia) Volante Rosso Motorsport | Aston Martin Vantage AMR GT3 | (United Arab Emirates) Jamie Day | (Australia) Jaylyn Robotham | (Ecuador) Mateo Villagomez | |
| 47 | (Australia) Supabarn Tigani Motorsport | Mercedes-AMG GT3 Evo | (Australia) James Koundouris | (Australia) Theo Koundouris | (Australia) David Russell | (Australia) Luke Youlden |
| 93 | (Australia) Wall Racing | Lamborghini Huracán GT3 Evo 2 | (Australia) Tony D'Alberto | (Australia) Adrian Deitz | (Australia) Grant Denyer | (New Zealand) Brendon Leitch |
Class A (GT3 Bronze) (3 entries)
| 4 | (Australia) Grove Racing | Mercedes-AMG GT3 Evo | (Australia) Brenton Grove | (Australia) Stephen Grove | (Germany) Fabian Schiller | |
| 9 | (Australia) Hallmarc Racing | Audi R8 LMS Evo II | (Australia) Marc Cini | (Australia) Dean Fiore | (Australia) Lee Holdsworth | |
| 27 | (United States) Heart of Racing by SPS | Mercedes-AMG GT3 Evo | (United Kingdom) Ross Gunn | (United Kingdom) Ian James | (Canada) Zacharie Robichon | |
Class A (GT3 Pro-Am) (3 entries)
| 36 | (Australia) Arise Racing GT | Ferrari 296 GT3 | (New Zealand) Jaxon Evans | (Italy) Alessio Rovera | (Australia) Brad Schumacher | (Australia) Elliot Schutte |
| 44 | (Australia) Geyer Valmont Racing | Audi R8 LMS Evo II | (Australia) Scott Andrews | (Australia) Sergio Pires | (Australia) Marcel Zalloua | |
| 91 | (Australia) The Bend Manthey EMA | Porsche 911 GT3 R (992) | (Germany) Laurin Heinrich | (Netherlands) Morris Schuring | (Australia) Sam Shahin | (Australia) Yasser Shahin |
Class C (GT4) (3 entries)
| 19 | (Australia) Team Nineteen | Mercedes-AMG GT4 | (Hong Kong) Daniel Bilski | (United Kingdom) Adam Christodoulou | (Australia) Mark Griffith | |
| 24 | (Australia) Method Motorsport | McLaren Artura GT4 | (Australia) Josh Buchan | (Australia) Jake Santalucia | (Australia) Anthony Levitt | |
| 25 | (Australia) Method Motorsport | McLaren Artura GT4 | (Australia) Paul Buccini | (Australia) Tom Hayman | (Australia) Ryan Sorensen | |
Class I (Invitational) (1 entry)
| 50 | (Australia) KTM Vantage Racing | KTM X-Bow GT2 | (Australia) David Crampton | (Australia) Trent Harrison | (Australia) Glen Wood | |

==== Notes ====
- 111 Racing was due to compete in the GT3-Bronze class with a Mercedes-AMG GT3 Evo and drivers Darren Currie, Grant Donaldson and Cameron McLeod, but withdrew due to a lack of funding.
- Cameron Campbell was originally entered to compete for Method Motorsport in the No. 24 McLaren, but withdrew after Friday practice. Josh Buchan replaced Campbell.

== Results ==
=== Practice ===
| Session | Day | Fastest Lap | | | | | |
| Session | Day | No. | Driver | Team | Car | Time | Ref |
|---|---|---|---|---|---|---|---|
| Practice 1 | Friday | 32 | (Brazil) Augusto Farfus | (Belgium) Team WRT | BMW M4 GT3 | 2:02.900 | |
| Practice 2 (Note: Session was for FIA Bronze categorised drivers only.) | Friday | 14 | (United Arab Emirates) Jamie Day | (Australia) Volante Rosso Motorsport | Aston Martin Vantage AMR GT3 | 2:05.106 | |
| Practice 3 | Friday | 888 | (Germany) Maro Engel | (Hong Kong) Mercedes-AMG Team GMR | Mercedes-AMG GT3 Evo | 2:03.851 | |
| Practice 4 | Friday | 183 | (Australia) Liam Talbot | (Australia) Jamec Racing | Audi R8 LMS Evo II | 2:05.093 | |
| Practice 5 | Saturday | 222 | (Australia) Cameron Waters | (Australia) Scott Taylor Motorsport | Mercedes-AMG GT3 Evo | 2:03.693 | |
| Practice 6 | Saturday | 222 | (Australia) Cameron Waters | (Australia) Scott Taylor Motorsport | Mercedes-AMG GT3 Evo | 2:02.700 | |

=== Qualifying ===
| Pos. | Class | No. | Driver | Team | Car | Time | |
| Pos. | Class | No. | Driver | Team | Car | Gr.A | Gr.B |
|---|---|---|---|---|---|---|---|
| 1 | P | 183 | (Switzerland) Ricardo Feller | (Australia) Jamec Racing | Audi R8 LMS Evo II | | 2:01.894 |
| 2 | PA | 91 | (Germany) Laurin Heinrich | (Australia) The Bend Manthey EMA | Porsche 911 GT3 R (992) | | +0.032 |
| 3 | P | 32 | (South Africa) Sheldon van der Linde | (Belgium) Team WRT | BMW M4 GT3 | | +0.035 |
| 4 | P | 222 | (Australia) Cameron Waters | (Australia) Scott Taylor Motorsport | Mercedes-AMG GT3 Evo | | +0.091 |
| 5 | P | 888 | (Germany) Maro Engel | (Hong Kong) Mercedes-AMG Team GMR | Mercedes-AMG GT3 Evo | | +0.136 |
| 6 | P | 75 | (Germany) Luca Stolz | (Australia) 75 Express | Mercedes-AMG GT3 Evo | | +0.221 |
| 7 | P | 77 | (Austria) Lucas Auer | (Hong Kong) Mercedes-AMG Team Craft-Bamboo Racing | Mercedes-AMG GT3 Evo | +0.234 | |
| 8 | P | 26 | (Australia) Chaz Mostert | (Australia) Arise Racing GT | Ferrari 296 GT3 | +0.330 | |
| 9 | B | 9 | (Australia) Lee Holdsworth | (Australia) Hallmarc Racing | Audi R8 LMS Evo II | +0.377 | |
| 10 | PA | 44 | (Australia) Scott Andrews | (Australia) Geyer Valmont Racing | Audi R8 LMS Evo II | +0.381 | |
| 11 | P | 911 | (Australia) Matt Campbell | (China) Absolute Racing | Porsche 911 GT3 R (992) | | +0.469 |
| 12 | P | 46 | (Switzerland) Raffaele Marciello | (Belgium) Team WRT | BMW M4 GT3 | | +0.493 |
| 13 | B | 27 | (United Kingdom) Ross Gunn | (United States) Heart of Racing by SPS | Mercedes-AMG GT3 Evo | | +0.504 |
| 14 | B | 4 | (Germany) Fabian Schiller | (Australia) Grove Racing | Mercedes-AMG GT3 Evo | +0.715 | |
| 15 | S | 47 | (Australia) David Russell | (Australia) Supabarn Tigani Motorsport | Mercedes-AMG GT3 Evo | +0.765 | |
| 16 | PA | 36 | (New Zealand) Jaxon Evans | (Australia) Arise Racing GT | Ferrari 296 GT3 | +0.957 | |
| 17 | S | 93 | (Australia) Tony D'Alberto | (Australia) Wall Racing | Lamborghini Huracán GT3 Evo 2 | | +1.022 |
| 18 | S | 14 | (United Arab Emirates) Jamie Day | (Australia) Volante Rosso Motorsport | Aston Martin Vantage AMR GT3 | | +1.096 |
| 19 | I | 50 | (Australia) David Crampton | (Australia) KTM Vantage Racing | KTM X-Bow GT2 | +11.973 | |
| 20 | GT4 | 19 | (United Kingdom) Adam Christodoulou | (Australia) Team Nineteen | Mercedes-AMG GT4 | +14.096 | |
| 21 | GT4 | 25 | (Australia) Tom Hayman | (Australia) Method Motorsport | McLaren Artura GT4 | +14.591 | |
| 22 | GT4 | 24 | (Australia) Jake Santalucia | (Australia) Method Motorsport | McLaren Artura GT4 | +14.643 | |

=== Top 10 Shootout ===
| Pos. | Class | No. | Driver | Team | Car | Time |
|---|---|---|---|---|---|---|
| 1 | P | 77 | (Austria) Lucas Auer | (Hong Kong) Mercedes-AMG Team Craft-Bamboo Racing | Mercedes-AMG GT3 Evo | 2:01.276 |
| 2 | P | 183 | (Switzerland) Ricardo Feller | (Australia) Jamec Racing | Audi R8 LMS Evo II | +0.125 |
| 3 | P | 888 | (Germany) Maro Engel | (Hong Kong) Mercedes-AMG Team GMR | Mercedes-AMG GT3 Evo | +0.283 |
| 4 | P | 32 | (South Africa) Sheldon van der Linde | (Belgium) Team WRT | BMW M4 GT3 | +0.417 |
| 5 | P | 26 | (Australia) Chaz Mostert | (Australia) Arise Racing GT | Ferrari 296 GT3 | +0.432 |
| 6 | PA | 91 | (Germany) Laurin Heinrich | (Australia) The Bend Manthey EMA | Porsche 911 GT3 R (992) | +0.616 |
| 7 | P | 75 | (Germany) Luca Stolz | (Australia) 75 Express | Mercedes-AMG GT3 Evo | +0.628 |
| 8 | PA | 44 | (Australia) Scott Andrews | (Australia) Geyer Valmont Racing | Audi R8 LMS Evo II | +0.658 |
| 9 | P | 222 | (Australia) Cameron Waters | (Australia) Scott Taylor Motorsport | Mercedes-AMG GT3 Evo | +0.675 |
| 10 | B | 9 | (Australia) Lee Holdsworth | (Australia) Hallmarc Racing | Audi R8 LMS Evo II | +0.894 |

=== Race ===
Class winners indicated in bold and with ‡.

| Pos. | Class | No. | Team | Drivers | Car | Laps | Time/Retired |
| Pos. | Class | No. | Team | Drivers | Engine | Laps | Time/Retired |
|---|---|---|---|---|---|---|---|
| 1 | P | **32** | **(Belgium) Team WRT** | **(Brazil) Augusto Farfus** **(South Africa) Kelvin van der Linde** **(South Africa) Sheldon van der Linde** | **BMW M4 GT3** | **306** | **12:01:53.135‡** |
| 1 | P | **32** | **(Belgium) Team WRT** | **(Brazil) Augusto Farfus** **(South Africa) Kelvin van der Linde** **(South Africa) Sheldon van der Linde** | **BMW S58B30T0 3.0 L Turbo I6** | **306** | **12:01:53.135‡** |
| 2 | P | 46 | (Belgium) Team WRT | (Switzerland) Raffaele Marciello (Italy) Valentino Rossi (Belgium) Charles Weerts | BMW M4 GT3 | 306 | +10.244 |
| 2 | P | 46 | (Belgium) Team WRT | (Switzerland) Raffaele Marciello (Italy) Valentino Rossi (Belgium) Charles Weerts | BMW S58B30T0 3.0 L Turbo I6 | 306 | +10.244 |
| 3 | P | 75 | (Australia) 75 Express | (Andorra) Jules Gounon (Australia) Kenny Habul (Germany) Luca Stolz | Mercedes-AMG GT3 Evo | 306 | +11.363 |
| 3 | P | 75 | (Australia) 75 Express | (Andorra) Jules Gounon (Australia) Kenny Habul (Germany) Luca Stolz | Mercedes-AMG M159 6.2 L V8 | 306 | +11.363 |
| 4 | P | 26 | (Australia) Arise Racing GT | (Australia) Will Brown (Australia) Chaz Mostert (Brazil) Daniel Serra | Ferrari 296 GT3 | 306 | +1:03.962 |
| 4 | P | 26 | (Australia) Arise Racing GT | (Australia) Will Brown (Australia) Chaz Mostert (Brazil) Daniel Serra | Ferrari F163 3.0 L Turbo V6 | 306 | +1:03.962 |
| 5 | P | 77 | (Hong Kong) Mercedes-AMG Team Craft-Bamboo Racing | (Austria) Lucas Auer (Germany) Maximilian Götz (Australia) Jayden Ojeda | Mercedes-AMG GT3 Evo | 306 | +1:27.904 |
| 5 | P | 77 | (Hong Kong) Mercedes-AMG Team Craft-Bamboo Racing | (Austria) Lucas Auer (Germany) Maximilian Götz (Australia) Jayden Ojeda | Mercedes-AMG M159 6.2 L V8 | 306 | +1:27.904 |
| 6 | P | 911 | (China) Absolute Racing | (Australia) Matt Campbell (Turkey) Ayhancan Güven (Belgium) Alessio Picariello | Porsche 911 GT3 R (992) | 306 | +1:42.068 |
| 6 | P | 911 | (China) Absolute Racing | (Australia) Matt Campbell (Turkey) Ayhancan Güven (Belgium) Alessio Picariello | Porsche M97/80 4.2 L Flat-6 | 306 | +1:42.068 |
| 7 | B | **27** | **(United States) Heart of Racing by SPS** | **(United Kingdom) Ross Gunn** **(United Kingdom) Ian James** **(Canada) Zacharie Robichon** | **Mercedes-AMG GT3 Evo** | **305** | **+1 Lap‡** |
| 7 | B | **27** | **(United States) Heart of Racing by SPS** | **(United Kingdom) Ross Gunn** **(United Kingdom) Ian James** **(Canada) Zacharie Robichon** | **Mercedes-AMG M159 6.2 L V8** | **305** | **+1 Lap‡** |
| 8 | PA | **36** | **(Australia) Arise Racing GT** | **(New Zealand) Jaxon Evans** **(Italy) Alessio Rovera** **(Australia) Brad Schumacher** **(Australia) Elliot Schutte** | **Ferrari 296 GT3** | **303** | **+3 Laps‡** |
| 8 | PA | **36** | **(Australia) Arise Racing GT** | **(New Zealand) Jaxon Evans** **(Italy) Alessio Rovera** **(Australia) Brad Schumacher** **(Australia) Elliot Schutte** | **Ferrari F163 3.0 L Turbo V6** | **303** | **+3 Laps‡** |
| 9 | S | **93** | **(Australia) Wall Racing** | **(Australia) Tony D'Alberto** **(Australia) Adrian Deitz** **(Australia) Grant Denyer** **(New Zealand) Brendon Leitch** | **Lamborghini Huracán GT3 Evo 2** | **303** | **+3 Laps‡** |
| 9 | S | **93** | **(Australia) Wall Racing** | **(Australia) Tony D'Alberto** **(Australia) Adrian Deitz** **(Australia) Grant Denyer** **(New Zealand) Brendon Leitch** | **Lamborghini DGF 5.2 L V10** | **303** | **+3 Laps‡** |
| 10 | PA | 91 | (Australia) The Bend Manthey EMA | (Germany) Laurin Heinrich (Netherlands) Morris Schuring (Australia) Sam Shahin (Australia) Yasser Shahin | Porsche 911 GT3 R (992) | 303 | +3 Laps |
| 10 | PA | 91 | (Australia) The Bend Manthey EMA | (Germany) Laurin Heinrich (Netherlands) Morris Schuring (Australia) Sam Shahin (Australia) Yasser Shahin | Porsche M97/80 4.2 L Flat-6 | 303 | +3 Laps |
| 11 | B | 9 | (Australia) Hallmarc Racing | (Australia) Marc Cini (Australia) Dean Fiore (Australia) Lee Holdsworth | Audi R8 LMS Evo II | 291 | +15 Laps |
| 11 | B | 9 | (Australia) Hallmarc Racing | (Australia) Marc Cini (Australia) Dean Fiore (Australia) Lee Holdsworth | Audi DAR 5.2 L V10 | 291 | +15 Laps |
| 12 | S | 47 | (Australia) Supabarn Tigani Motorsport | (Australia) James Koundouris (Australia) Theo Koundouris (Australia) David Russell (Australia) Luke Youlden | Mercedes-AMG GT3 Evo | 283 | +23 Laps |
| 12 | S | 47 | (Australia) Supabarn Tigani Motorsport | (Australia) James Koundouris (Australia) Theo Koundouris (Australia) David Russell (Australia) Luke Youlden | Mercedes-AMG M159 6.2 L V8 | 283 | +23 Laps |
| 13 | S | 14 | (Australia) Volante Rosso Motorsport | (United Arab Emirates) Jamie Day (Australia) Jaylyn Robotham (Ecuador) Mateo Villagomez | Aston Martin Vantage AMR GT3 | 276 | +30 Laps |
| 13 | S | 14 | (Australia) Volante Rosso Motorsport | (United Arab Emirates) Jamie Day (Australia) Jaylyn Robotham (Ecuador) Mateo Villagomez | Aston Martin M177 4.0 L Turbo V8 | 276 | +30 Laps |
| 14 | GT4 | **24** | **(Australia) Method Motorsport** | **(Australia) Josh Buchan** **(Australia) Jake Santalucia** **(Australia) Anthony Levitt** | **McLaren Artura GT4** | **276** | **+30 Laps‡** |
| 14 | GT4 | **24** | **(Australia) Method Motorsport** | **(Australia) Josh Buchan** **(Australia) Jake Santalucia** **(Australia) Anthony Levitt** | **McLaren M630 3.0 L Turbo V6** | **276** | **+30 Laps‡** |
| 15 | I | **50** | **(Australia) KTM Vantage Racing** | **(Australia) David Crampton** **(Australia) Trent Harrison** **(Australia) Glen Wood** | **KTM X-Bow GT2** | **270** | **+36 Laps‡** |
| 15 | I | **50** | **(Australia) KTM Vantage Racing** | **(Australia) David Crampton** **(Australia) Trent Harrison** **(Australia) Glen Wood** | **Audi TFSI 2.5 L Turbo I5** | **270** | **+36 Laps‡** |
| 16 | GT4 | 19 | (Australia) Team Nineteen | (Hong Kong) Daniel Bilski (United Kingdom) Adam Christodoulou (Australia) Mark Griffith | Mercedes-AMG GT4 | 261 | +45 Laps |
| 16 | GT4 | 19 | (Australia) Team Nineteen | (Hong Kong) Daniel Bilski (United Kingdom) Adam Christodoulou (Australia) Mark Griffith | Mercedes-AMG M178 4.0 L Turbo V8 | 261 | +45 Laps |
| 17 | PA | 44 | (Australia) Geyer Valmont Racing | (Australia) Scott Andrews (Australia) Sergio Pires (Australia) Marcel Zalloua | Audi R8 LMS Evo II | 241 | +65 Laps |
| 17 | PA | 44 | (Australia) Geyer Valmont Racing | (Australia) Scott Andrews (Australia) Sergio Pires (Australia) Marcel Zalloua | Audi DAR 5.2 L V10 | 241 | +65 Laps |
| DNF | P | 888 | (Hong Kong) Mercedes-AMG Team GMR | (Germany) Maro Engel (Canada) Mikaël Grenier (Belgium) Maxime Martin | Mercedes-AMG GT3 Evo | 170 | Crash |
| DNF | P | 888 | (Hong Kong) Mercedes-AMG Team GMR | (Germany) Maro Engel (Canada) Mikaël Grenier (Belgium) Maxime Martin | Mercedes-AMG M159 6.2 L V8 | 170 | Crash |
| DNF | P | 183 | (Australia) Jamec Racing | (Australia) Broc Feeney (Switzerland) Ricardo Feller (Australia) Liam Talbot | Audi R8 LMS Evo II | 164 | Steering |
| DNF | P | 183 | (Australia) Jamec Racing | (Australia) Broc Feeney (Switzerland) Ricardo Feller (Australia) Liam Talbot | Audi DAR 5.2 L V10 | 164 | Steering |
| DNF | B | 4 | (Australia) Grove Racing | (Australia) Brenton Grove (Australia) Stephen Grove (Germany) Fabian Schiller | Mercedes-AMG GT3 Evo | 53 | Crash |
| DNF | B | 4 | (Australia) Grove Racing | (Australia) Brenton Grove (Australia) Stephen Grove (Germany) Fabian Schiller | Mercedes-AMG M159 6.2 L V8 | 53 | Crash |
| DNF | GT4 | 25 | (Australia) Method Motorsport | (Australia) Paul Buccini (Australia) Tom Hayman (Australia) Ryan Sorensen | McLaren Artura GT4 | 36 | Crash |
| DNF | GT4 | 25 | (Australia) Method Motorsport | (Australia) Paul Buccini (Australia) Tom Hayman (Australia) Ryan Sorensen | McLaren M630 3.0 L Turbo V6 | 36 | Crash |
| DNF | P | 222 | (Australia) Scott Taylor Motorsport | (Australia) Craig Lowndes (Australia) Thomas Randle (Australia) Cameron Waters | Mercedes-AMG GT3 Evo | 35 | Crash |
| DNF | P | 222 | (Australia) Scott Taylor Motorsport | (Australia) Craig Lowndes (Australia) Thomas Randle (Australia) Cameron Waters | Mercedes-AMG M159 6.2 L V8 | 35 | Crash |

- Fastest race lap: 2:02.2740 – Chaz Mostert

== Notes ==
Intercontinental GT Challenge
| Previous race: 2024 Indianapolis 8 Hours | 2025 season | Next race: 2025 24 Hours of Nürburgring |
