= 2025 Indianapolis 8 Hour =

Sports car race in Indianapolis, Indiana

(United States) Indianapolis 8 Hour
Event information
- Round 5 of 5 in the 2025 Intercontinental GT Challenge
- Date: 18 October 2025
- Location: Indianapolis, Indiana, U.S.
- Venue: Indianapolis Motor Speedway
- Duration: 8 Hours

Results
- Laps completed: 198
- Distance: 779.13 km (484.13 mi)

Pole position
- Time: 1:22.283
- Team: (United States) Mercedes-AMG Team Lone Star Racing
- Drivers: (Andorra) Jules Gounon (Netherlands) Lin Hodenius (Belgium) Maxime Martin

Winners
- Time: 8:00:16.725
- Team: (Belgium) Team WRT
- Drivers: (South Africa) Kelvin van der Linde (Italy) Valentino Rossi (Belgium) Charles Weerts

The 2025 Indianapolis 8 Hour (formally known as the Indianapolis 8 Hour Presented by AWS) was a sports car race held at the Indianapolis Motor Speedway in Indianapolis, Indiana, on October 18, 2025. It was the fifth and final round of the 2025 Intercontinental GT Challenge and the seventh and final round of the 2025 GT World Challenge America season.

== Entry list ==
The provisional entry list was announced on September 17, featuring 27 entries. Eight manufacturers were represented: 7 Porsche cars, 6 Mercedes cars, 5 BMW cars, 2 Ferrari and Aston Martin cars, and 1 car each from Corvette, McLaren, and Ford. An updated list was revealed on 10 October, with the grid decreasing to 25 entries, with Racers Edge Motorsports and CRP Racing withdrawing from the event.

No.	Entrant	Car	Driver 1	Driver 2	Driver 3
Pro (11 entries)
18	(United States) RS1	Porsche 911 GT3 R (992)	(Belgium) Jan Heylen	(Belgium) Alessio Picariello	(United Kingdom) Alex Sedgwick
34	(Canada) JMF Motorsports	Mercedes-AMG GT3 Evo	(Austria) Lucas Auer	(Canada) Mikaël Grenier	(United States) Michai Stephens
46	(Belgium) Team WRT	BMW M4 GT3 Evo	(South Africa) Kelvin van der Linde	(Italy) Valentino Rossi	(Belgium) Charles Weerts
51	(United States) Random Vandals Racing	BMW M4 GT3 Evo	(United States) Bill Auberlen	(United States) Varun Choksey	(Austria) Philipp Eng
61	(New Zealand) Earl Bamber Motorsport	Porsche 911 GT3 R (992)	(Malaysia) Adrian D'Silva	(Switzerland) Ricardo Feller	(Germany) Sven Müller
75	(Australia) 75 Express	Mercedes-AMG GT3 Evo	(Australia) Kenny Habul	(Australia) Chaz Mostert	(Australia) Will Power
80	(United States) Mercedes-AMG Team Lone Star Racing	Mercedes-AMG GT3 Evo	(Andorra) Jules Gounon	(Netherlands) Lin Hodenius	(Belgium) Maxime Martin
99	(United States) Random Vandals Racing	BMW M4 GT3 Evo	(United States) Conor Daly	(United States) Connor De Phillippi	(United States) Kenton Koch
120	(United States) Wright Motorsports	Porsche 911 GT3 R (992)	(United States) Adam Adelson	(Germany) Laurin Heinrich	(United States) Elliott Skeer
777	(Belgium) Team WRT	BMW M4 GT3 Evo	(Brazil) Augusto Farfus	(Switzerland) Raffaele Marciello	(Oman) Al Faisal Al Zubair
888	(Hong Kong) Mercedes-AMG Team GMR	Mercedes-AMG GT3 Evo	(Germany) Maro Engel	(Germany) Tom Kalender	(Germany) Luca Stolz
Pro-Am (12 entries)
04	(United States) CrowdStrike Racing by Riley Motorsports	Mercedes-AMG GT3 Evo	(United States) Colin Braun	(United States) George Kurtz	(United Kingdom) Toby Sowery
7	(Germany) Herberth Motorsport	Porsche 911 GT3 R (992)	(Germany) Ralf Bohn	(Switzerland) Rolf Ineichen	(Germany) Robert Renauer
10	(United States) Wright Motorsports	Porsche 911 GT3 R (992)	(Hong Kong) Antares Au	(Netherlands) Loek Hartog	(Switzerland) Patric Niederhauser
11	(United States) DXDT Racing	Chevrolet Corvette Z06 GT3.R	(United Kingdom) Matt Bell	(United States) Blake McDonald	(United States) Alec Udell
16	(Italy) AF Corse USA	Ferrari 296 GT3	(Brazil) Christian Hahn	(Brazil) Marcelo Hahn	(Brazil) Allam Khodair
21	(Germany) Blattner Company by Herberth Motorsport	Porsche 911 GT3 R (992)	(United States) Dustin Blattner	(Germany) Dennis Marschall	(Germany) Alfred Renauer
24	(United States) Heart of Racing Team	Aston Martin Vantage AMR GT3 Evo	(United States) Gray Newell	(Canada) Zacharie Robichon	(United Kingdom) Darren Turner
29	(United States) Turner Motorsport	BMW M4 GT3 Evo	(United States) Robby Foley	(United States) Patrick Gallagher	(United States) Justin Rothberg
32	(United States) GMG Racing	Porsche 911 GT3 R (992)	(Austria) Klaus Bachler	(Australia) Tom Sargent	(United States) Kyle Washington
50	(United States) Chouest Povoledo Racing	Chevrolet Corvette Z06 GT3.R	(Netherlands) Nicky Catsburg	(United States) Ross Chouest	(Canada) Aaron Povoledo
88	(United States) Archangel Motorsports	McLaren 720S GT3 Evo	(United States) Todd Coleman	(United States) Thomas Merrill	(United States) Aaron Telitz
91	(United States) Regulator Racing	Mercedes-AMG GT3 Evo	(Netherlands) "Daan Arrow"	(United States) Jeff Burton	(Switzerland) Philip Ellis
Am (2 entries)
6	(United States) Dollahite Racing	Ford Mustang GT3	(United States) Scott Dollahite	(Italy) Stefano Gattuso	(United States) Eric Powell
163	(Italy) AF Corse USA	Ferrari 296 GT3	(United States) Conrad Grunewald	(Brazil) Oswaldo Negri Jr.	(United States) Jay Schreibman

== Race results ==
Class winners denoted in bold and with ‡

Pos	Class	No.	Team	Drivers	Car	Laps	Time/Retired
Pos	Class	No.	Team	Drivers	Engine	Laps	Time/Retired
1	P	**46**	**(Belgium) Team WRT**	**(South Africa) Kelvin van der Linde** **(Italy) Valentino Rossi** **(Belgium) Charles Weerts**	**BMW M4 GT3 Evo**	**198**	**8:00:16.725‡**
1	P	**46**	**(Belgium) Team WRT**	**(South Africa) Kelvin van der Linde** **(Italy) Valentino Rossi** **(Belgium) Charles Weerts**	**BMW P58 3.0 L Twin-turbo I6**	**198**	**8:00:16.725‡**
2	P	888	(Hong Kong) Mercedes-AMG Team GMR	(Germany) Maro Engel (Germany) Tom Kalender (Germany) Luca Stolz	Mercedes-AMG GT3 Evo	198	+0.805
2	P	888	(Hong Kong) Mercedes-AMG Team GMR	(Germany) Maro Engel (Germany) Tom Kalender (Germany) Luca Stolz	Mercedes-Benz M159 6.2 L V8	198	+0.805
3	P	777	(Belgium) Team WRT	(Brazil) Augusto Farfus (Switzerland) Raffaele Marciello (Oman) Al Faisal Al Zubair	BMW M4 GT3 Evo	198	+2.542
3	P	777	(Belgium) Team WRT	(Brazil) Augusto Farfus (Switzerland) Raffaele Marciello (Oman) Al Faisal Al Zubair	BMW P58 3.0 L Twin-turbo I6	198	+2.542
4	P	99	(United States) Random Vandals Racing	(United States) Connor De Phillippi (United States) Kenton Koch (United States) Conor Daly	BMW M4 GT3 Evo	198	+10.448
4	P	99	(United States) Random Vandals Racing	(United States) Connor De Phillippi (United States) Kenton Koch (United States) Conor Daly	BMW P58 3.0 L Twin-turbo I6	198	+10.448
5	P	18	(United States) RS1	(Belgium) Jan Heylen (Belgium) Alessio Picariello (United Kingdom) Alex Sedgwick	Porsche 911 GT3 R (992)	198	+33.069
5	P	18	(United States) RS1	(Belgium) Jan Heylen (Belgium) Alessio Picariello (United Kingdom) Alex Sedgwick	Porsche M97/80 4.2 L Flat-6	198	+33.069
6	P	75	(Australia) 75 Express	(Australia) Kenny Habul (Australia) Chaz Mostert (Australia) Will Power	Mercedes-AMG GT3 Evo	198	+39.167
6	P	75	(Australia) 75 Express	(Australia) Kenny Habul (Australia) Chaz Mostert (Australia) Will Power	Mercedes-Benz M159 6.2 L V8	198	+39.167
7	P	34	(Canada) JMF Motorsports	(Canada) Mikaël Grenier (United States) Michai Stephens (Austria) Lucas Auer	Mercedes-AMG GT3 Evo	198	+19:45.525
7	P	34	(Canada) JMF Motorsports	(Canada) Mikaël Grenier (United States) Michai Stephens (Austria) Lucas Auer	Mercedes-Benz M159 6.2 L V8	198	+19:45.525
8	PA	**21**	**(Germany) Blattner Company by Herberth Motorsport**	**(United States) Dustin Blattner** **(Germany) Dennis Marschall** **(Germany) Alfred Renauer**	**Porsche 911 GT3 R (992)**	**197**	**+1 Lap‡**
8	PA	**21**	**(Germany) Blattner Company by Herberth Motorsport**	**(United States) Dustin Blattner** **(Germany) Dennis Marschall** **(Germany) Alfred Renauer**	**Porsche M97/80 4.2 L Flat-6**	**197**	**+1 Lap‡**
9	PA	10	(United States) Wright Motorsports	(Hong Kong) Antares Au (Netherlands) Loek Hartog (Switzerland) Patric Niederhauser	Porsche 911 GT3 R (992)	197	+1 Lap
9	PA	10	(United States) Wright Motorsports	(Hong Kong) Antares Au (Netherlands) Loek Hartog (Switzerland) Patric Niederhauser	Porsche M97/80 4.2 L Flat-6	197	+1 Lap
10	PA	29	(United States) Turner Motorsport	(United States) Robby Foley (United States) Patrick Gallagher (United States) Justin Rothberg	BMW M4 GT3 Evo	197	+1 Lap
10	PA	29	(United States) Turner Motorsport	(United States) Robby Foley (United States) Patrick Gallagher (United States) Justin Rothberg	BMW P58 3.0 L Twin-turbo I6	197	+1 Lap
11	PA	24	(United States) Heart of Racing Team	(United States) Gray Newell (Canada) Zacharie Robichon (United Kingdom) Darren Turner	Aston Martin Vantage AMR GT3 Evo	197	+1 Lap
11	PA	24	(United States) Heart of Racing Team	(United States) Gray Newell (Canada) Zacharie Robichon (United Kingdom) Darren Turner	Aston Martin M177 4.0 L Turbo V8	197	+1 Lap
12	PA	88	(United States) Archangel Motorsports	(United States) Todd Coleman (United States) Aaron Telitz (United States) Thomas Merrill	McLaren 720S GT3 Evo	197	+1 Lap
12	PA	88	(United States) Archangel Motorsports	(United States) Todd Coleman (United States) Aaron Telitz (United States) Thomas Merrill	McLaren M840T 4.0 L Turbo V8	197	+1 Lap
13	PA	04	(United States) CrowdStrike Racing by Riley Motorsports	(United States) Colin Braun (United States) George Kurtz (United Kingdom) Toby Sowery	Mercedes-AMG GT3 Evo	197	+1 Lap
13	PA	04	(United States) CrowdStrike Racing by Riley Motorsports	(United States) Colin Braun (United States) George Kurtz (United Kingdom) Toby Sowery	Mercedes-Benz M159 6.2 L V8	197	+1 Lap
14	PA	32	(United States) GMG Racing	(Austria) Klaus Bachler (Australia) Tom Sargent (United States) Kyle Washington	Porsche 911 GT3 R (992)	197	+1 Lap
14	PA	32	(United States) GMG Racing	(Austria) Klaus Bachler (Australia) Tom Sargent (United States) Kyle Washington	Porsche M97/80 4.2 L Flat-6	197	+1 Lap
15	PA	7	(Germany) Herberth Motorsport	(Germany) Ralf Bohn (Switzerland) Rolf Ineichen (Germany) Robert Renauer	Porsche 911 GT3 R (992)	196	+2 Laps
15	PA	7	(Germany) Herberth Motorsport	(Germany) Ralf Bohn (Switzerland) Rolf Ineichen (Germany) Robert Renauer	Porsche M97/80 4.2 L Flat-6	196	+2 Laps
16	PA	91	(United States) Regulator Racing	(United States) Jeff Burton (Switzerland) Philip Ellis (Netherlands) "Daan Arrow"	Mercedes-AMG GT3 Evo	196	+2 Laps
16	PA	91	(United States) Regulator Racing	(United States) Jeff Burton (Switzerland) Philip Ellis (Netherlands) "Daan Arrow"	Mercedes-Benz M159 6.2 L V8	196	+2 Laps
17	Am	**163**	**(Italy) AF Corse USA**	**(United States) Conrad Grunewald** **(Brazil) Oswaldo Negri Jr.** **(United States) Jay Schreibman**	**Ferrari 296 GT3**	**195**	**+3 Laps‡**
17	Am	**163**	**(Italy) AF Corse USA**	**(United States) Conrad Grunewald** **(Brazil) Oswaldo Negri Jr.** **(United States) Jay Schreibman**	**Ferrari F163CE 3.0 L Turbo V6**	**195**	**+3 Laps‡**
18	Am	6	(United States) Dollahite Racing	(United States) Scott Dollahite (Italy) Stefano Gattuso (United States) Eric Powell	Ford Mustang GT3	195	+3 Laps
18	Am	6	(United States) Dollahite Racing	(United States) Scott Dollahite (Italy) Stefano Gattuso (United States) Eric Powell	Ford Coyote 5.4 L V8	195	+3 Laps
19	PA	16	(Italy) AF Corse USA	(Brazil) Christian Hahn (Brazil) Marcelo Hahn (Brazil) Allam Khodair	Ferrari 296 GT3	194	+4 Laps
19	PA	16	(Italy) AF Corse USA	(Brazil) Christian Hahn (Brazil) Marcelo Hahn (Brazil) Allam Khodair	Ferrari F163CE 3.0 L Turbo V6	194	+4 Laps
20	PA	50	(United States) Chouest Povoledo Racing	(United States) Ross Chouest (Canada) Aaron Povoledo (Netherlands) Nicky Catsburg	Chevrolet Corvette Z06 GT3.R	192	+6 Laps
20	PA	50	(United States) Chouest Povoledo Racing	(United States) Ross Chouest (Canada) Aaron Povoledo (Netherlands) Nicky Catsburg	Chevrolet LT6.R 5.5 L V8	192	+6 Laps
21	P	80	(United States) Mercedes-AMG Lone Star Racing	(Andorra) Jules Gounon (Netherlands) Lin Hodenius (Belgium) Maxime Martin	Mercedes-AMG GT3 Evo	183	+15 Laps
21	P	80	(United States) Mercedes-AMG Lone Star Racing	(Andorra) Jules Gounon (Netherlands) Lin Hodenius (Belgium) Maxime Martin	Mercedes-Benz M159 6.2 L V8	183	+15 Laps
22	PA	11	(United States) DXDT Racing	(United Kingdom) Matt Bell (United States) Blake McDonald (United States) Alec Udell	Chevrolet Corvette Z06 GT3.R	174	+24 Laps
22	PA	11	(United States) DXDT Racing	(United Kingdom) Matt Bell (United States) Blake McDonald (United States) Alec Udell	Chevrolet LT6.R 5.5 L V8	174	+24 Laps
DNF	P	61	(New Zealand) EBM	(Malaysia) Adrian D'Silva (Switzerland) Ricardo Feller (Germany) Sven Müller	Porsche 911 GT3 R (992)	161	Electrical
DNF	P	61	(New Zealand) EBM	(Malaysia) Adrian D'Silva (Switzerland) Ricardo Feller (Germany) Sven Müller	Porsche M97/80 4.2 L Flat-6	161	Electrical
DNF	P	51	(United States) Random Vandals Racing	(United States) Bill Auberlen (United States) Varun Choksey (Austria) Philipp Eng	BMW M4 GT3 Evo	156	Throttle body
DNF	P	51	(United States) Random Vandals Racing	(United States) Bill Auberlen (United States) Varun Choksey (Austria) Philipp Eng	BMW P58 3.0 L Twin-turbo I6	156	Throttle body
DNF	P	120	(United States) Wright Motorsports	(United States) Adam Adelson (Germany) Laurin Heinrich (United States) Elliott Skeer	Porsche 911 GT3 R (992)	130	Contact
DNF	P	120	(United States) Wright Motorsports	(United States) Adam Adelson (Germany) Laurin Heinrich (United States) Elliott Skeer	Porsche M97/80 4.2 L Flat-6	130	Contact

Icon	Class
**P**	Pro Cup
**PA**	Pro-Am Cup
**Am**	Am Cup

Intercontinental GT Challenge
Previous race: 2025 Suzuka 1000 km	2025 season	Next race: none
