= 2025 Intercontinental GT Challenge =

Motorsport event

The 2025 Intercontinental GT Challenge was the tenth season of the Intercontinental GT Challenge. For the first time since 2019, the series returned to five rounds starting with the Bathurst 12 Hour on 2 February with the finale at Indianapolis 8 Hour on 18 October.

== Calendar ==
Map of circuit locations

The provisional calendar was released on 28 July 2024, at the SRO's annual press conference, including 5 rounds. On 6 August 2024, the calendar was officialized, the date of Suzuka round was revealed and the date of Indianapolis round was pushed back two weeks.

Also part of the GT World Challenge Europe
Also part of the GT World Challenge America

| Round | Race | Circuit | Date | Report |
|---|---|---|---|---|
| 1 | (Australia) Meguiar's Bathurst 12 Hour | Mount Panorama Circuit, Bathurst, New South Wales, Australia | 31 January–2 February | Report |
| 2 | (Germany) ADAC Ravenol Nürburgring 24 Hours | Nürburgring Nordschleife, Nürburg, Germany | 19–22 June | Report |
| 3 | (Belgium) CrowdStrike 24 Hours of Spa | Circuit de Spa-Francorchamps, Stavelot, Belgium | 26–29 June | Report |
| 4 | (Japan) Suzuka 1000 km | Suzuka International Racing Course, Suzuka, Mie Prefecture, Japan | 12–14 September | Report |
| 5 | (United States) Indianapolis 8 Hour Presented by AWS | Indianapolis Motor Speedway, Indianapolis, Indiana, United States | 16–18 October | Report |

== Entries ==
| Manufacturer | Team | Car | No. | Drivers | Class | Rounds |
|---|---|---|---|---|---|---|
| BMW | (Belgium) Team WRT | BMW M4 GT3 | 32 | (Brazil) Augusto Farfus | P | 1 |
| BMW | (Belgium) Team WRT | BMW M4 GT3 | 32 | (South Africa) Kelvin van der Linde | P | 1 |
| BMW | (Belgium) Team WRT | BMW M4 GT3 | 32 | (South Africa) Sheldon van der Linde | P | 1 |
| BMW | (Belgium) Team WRT | BMW M4 GT3 | 46 | (Switzerland) Raffaele Marciello | P | 1 |
| BMW | (Belgium) Team WRT | BMW M4 GT3 | 46 | (Italy) Valentino Rossi | P | 1 |
| BMW | (Belgium) Team WRT | BMW M4 GT3 | 46 | (Belgium) Charles Weerts | P | 1 |
| BMW | (Italy) BMW Italia Ceccato Racing | BMW M4 GT3 Evo | 15 | (United States) Connor De Phillippi | B | 3 |
| BMW | (Italy) BMW Italia Ceccato Racing | BMW M4 GT3 Evo | 15 | (Italy) Felice Jelmini | B | 3 |
| BMW | (Italy) BMW Italia Ceccato Racing | BMW M4 GT3 Evo | 15 | (Italy) Federico Malvestiti | B | 3 |
| BMW | (Italy) BMW Italia Ceccato Racing | BMW M4 GT3 Evo | 15 | (Brazil) Marcelo Tomasoni | B | 3 |
| BMW | (United States) Turner Motorsport | BMW M4 GT3 Evo | 29 | (United States) Robby Foley | PA | 5 |
| BMW | (United States) Turner Motorsport | BMW M4 GT3 Evo | 29 | (United States) Patrick Gallagher | PA | 5 |
| BMW | (United States) Turner Motorsport | BMW M4 GT3 Evo | 29 | (United States) Justin Rothberg | PA | 5 |
| BMW | (Belgium) Team WRT (Note: Car No. 30, No. 31, No. 32 and No. 46 entered as Team WRT, and car No. 777 entered as AlManar Racing by WRT.) (Oman) AlManar Racing by WRT | BMW M4 GT3 Evo | 30 | (Sweden) Gustav Bergström | S | 3 |
| BMW | (Belgium) Team WRT (Oman) AlManar Racing by WRT | BMW M4 GT3 Evo | 30 | (France) Étienne Cheli | S | 3 |
| BMW | (Belgium) Team WRT (Oman) AlManar Racing by WRT | BMW M4 GT3 Evo | 30 | (Belgium) Gilles Stadsbader | S | 3 |
| BMW | (Belgium) Team WRT (Oman) AlManar Racing by WRT | BMW M4 GT3 Evo | 30 | (France) Pierre-Louis Chovet | S | 3 |
| BMW | (Belgium) Team WRT (Oman) AlManar Racing by WRT | BMW M4 GT3 Evo | 31 | (South Africa) Sheldon van der Linde | P | 3 |
| BMW | (Belgium) Team WRT (Oman) AlManar Racing by WRT | BMW M4 GT3 Evo | 31 | (Belgium) Dries Vanthoor | P | 3 |
| BMW | (Belgium) Team WRT (Oman) AlManar Racing by WRT | BMW M4 GT3 Evo | 31 | (Germany) Marco Wittmann | P | 3 |
| BMW | (Belgium) Team WRT (Oman) AlManar Racing by WRT | BMW M4 GT3 Evo | 31 | (Brazil) Augusto Farfus | P | 4 |
| BMW | (Belgium) Team WRT (Oman) AlManar Racing by WRT | BMW M4 GT3 Evo | 31 | (United Kingdom) Dan Harper | P | 4 |
| BMW | (Belgium) Team WRT (Oman) AlManar Racing by WRT | BMW M4 GT3 Evo | 31 | (Germany) Max Hesse | P | 4 |
| BMW | (Belgium) Team WRT (Oman) AlManar Racing by WRT | BMW M4 GT3 Evo | 32 | (South Africa) Kelvin van der Linde | P | 3–4 |
| BMW | (Belgium) Team WRT (Oman) AlManar Racing by WRT | BMW M4 GT3 Evo | 32 | (Belgium) Charles Weerts | P | 3–4 |
| BMW | (Belgium) Team WRT (Oman) AlManar Racing by WRT | BMW M4 GT3 Evo | 32 | (Belgium) Ugo de Wilde | P | 3 |
| BMW | (Belgium) Team WRT (Oman) AlManar Racing by WRT | BMW M4 GT3 Evo | 32 | (Switzerland) Raffaele Marciello | P | 4 |
| BMW | (Belgium) Team WRT (Oman) AlManar Racing by WRT | BMW M4 GT3 Evo | 46 | (Italy) Valentino Rossi | P | 3, 5 |
| BMW | (Belgium) Team WRT (Oman) AlManar Racing by WRT | BMW M4 GT3 Evo | 46 | (Denmark) Kevin Magnussen | P | 3 |
| BMW | (Belgium) Team WRT (Oman) AlManar Racing by WRT | BMW M4 GT3 Evo | 46 | (Germany) René Rast | P | 3 |
| BMW | (Belgium) Team WRT (Oman) AlManar Racing by WRT | BMW M4 GT3 Evo | 46 | (South Africa) Kelvin van der Linde | P | 5 |
| BMW | (Belgium) Team WRT (Oman) AlManar Racing by WRT | BMW M4 GT3 Evo | 46 | (Belgium) Charles Weerts | P | 5 |
| BMW | (Belgium) Team WRT (Oman) AlManar Racing by WRT | BMW M4 GT3 Evo | 777 | (Germany) Jens Klingmann | G | 3 |
| BMW | (Belgium) Team WRT (Oman) AlManar Racing by WRT | BMW M4 GT3 Evo | 777 | (United Kingdom) Ben Tuck | G | 3 |
| BMW | (Belgium) Team WRT (Oman) AlManar Racing by WRT | BMW M4 GT3 Evo | 777 | (United States) Neil Verhagen | G | 3 |
| BMW | (Belgium) Team WRT (Oman) AlManar Racing by WRT | BMW M4 GT3 Evo | 777 | (Oman) Al Faisal Al Zubair | G | 3 |
| BMW | (Belgium) Team WRT (Oman) AlManar Racing by WRT | BMW M4 GT3 Evo | 777 | (Oman) Al Faisal Al Zubair | P | 5 |
| BMW | (Belgium) Team WRT (Oman) AlManar Racing by WRT | BMW M4 GT3 Evo | 777 | (Brazil) Augusto Farfus | P | 5 |
| BMW | (Belgium) Team WRT (Oman) AlManar Racing by WRT | BMW M4 GT3 Evo | 777 | (Switzerland) Raffaele Marciello | P | 5 |
| BMW | (United Kingdom) Century Motorsport | BMW M4 GT3 Evo | 42 | (Netherlands) Mex Jansen | S | 3 |
| BMW | (United Kingdom) Century Motorsport | BMW M4 GT3 Evo | 42 | (United Kingdom) Will Moore | S | 3 |
| BMW | (United Kingdom) Century Motorsport | BMW M4 GT3 Evo | 42 | (South Africa) Jarrod Waberski | S | 3 |
| BMW | (United States) Random Vandals Racing | BMW M4 GT3 Evo | 51 | (United States) Bill Auberlen | P | 5 |
| BMW | (United States) Random Vandals Racing | BMW M4 GT3 Evo | 51 | (United States) Varun Choksey | P | 5 |
| BMW | (United States) Random Vandals Racing | BMW M4 GT3 Evo | 51 | (Austria) Philipp Eng | P | 5 |
| BMW | (United States) Random Vandals Racing | BMW M4 GT3 Evo | 99 | (United States) Conor Daly | P | 5 |
| BMW | (United States) Random Vandals Racing | BMW M4 GT3 Evo | 99 | (United States) Connor De Phillippi | P | 5 |
| BMW | (United States) Random Vandals Racing | BMW M4 GT3 Evo | 99 | (United States) Kenton Koch | P | 5 |
| BMW | (China) Team KRC | BMW M4 GT3 Evo | 89 | (Netherlands) Maxime Oosten | B | 4 |
| BMW | (China) Team KRC | BMW M4 GT3 Evo | 89 | (China) Ruan Cunfan | B | 4 |
| BMW | (China) Team KRC | BMW M4 GT3 Evo | 89 | (United States) Neil Verhagen | B | 4 |
| BMW | (Germany) Rowe Racing | BMW M4 GT3 Evo | 98 | (Brazil) Augusto Farfus | P | 2–3 |
| BMW | (Germany) Rowe Racing | BMW M4 GT3 Evo | 98 | (Finland) Jesse Krohn | P | 2–3 |
| BMW | (Germany) Rowe Racing | BMW M4 GT3 Evo | 98 | (Switzerland) Raffaele Marciello | P | 2–3 |
| BMW | (Germany) Rowe Racing | BMW M4 GT3 Evo | 98 | (South Africa) Kelvin van der Linde | P | 2 |
| BMW | (Germany) Rowe Racing | BMW M4 GT3 Evo | 998 | (Austria) Philipp Eng | P | 3 |
| BMW | (Germany) Rowe Racing | BMW M4 GT3 Evo | 998 | (United Kingdom) Dan Harper | P | 3 |
| BMW | (Germany) Rowe Racing | BMW M4 GT3 Evo | 998 | (Germany) Max Hesse | P | 3 |
| BMW | (United Kingdom) Paradine Competition | BMW M4 GT3 Evo | 991 | (United Kingdom) Jake Dennis | B | 3 |
| BMW | (United Kingdom) Paradine Competition | BMW M4 GT3 Evo | 991 | (Indonesia) Sean Gelael | B | 3 |
| BMW | (United Kingdom) Paradine Competition | BMW M4 GT3 Evo | 991 | (United Kingdom) Darren Leung | B | 3 |
| BMW | (United Kingdom) Paradine Competition | BMW M4 GT3 Evo | 991 | (United Kingdom) Toby Sowery | B | 3 |
| BMW | (United Kingdom) Paradine Competition | BMW M4 GT3 Evo | 992 | (United Kingdom) Charles Clark | S | 3 |
| BMW | (United Kingdom) Paradine Competition | BMW M4 GT3 Evo | 992 | (Brazil) Pedro Ebrahim | S | 3 |
| BMW | (United Kingdom) Paradine Competition | BMW M4 GT3 Evo | 992 | (United Kingdom) James Kellett | S | 3 |
| BMW | (United Kingdom) Paradine Competition | BMW M4 GT3 Evo | 992 | (Netherlands) Maxime Oosten | S | 3 |
| Ferrari | (Switzerland) Kessel Racing | Ferrari 296 GT3 | 8 | (Italy) Daniele Di Amato | B | 3 |
| Ferrari | (Switzerland) Kessel Racing | Ferrari 296 GT3 | 8 | (Italy) David Fumanelli | B | 3 |
| Ferrari | (Switzerland) Kessel Racing | Ferrari 296 GT3 | 8 | (Switzerland) Nicolò Rosi | B | 3 |
| Ferrari | (Switzerland) Kessel Racing | Ferrari 296 GT3 | 8 | (Italy) Niccolò Schirò | B | 3 |
| Ferrari | (Switzerland) Kessel Racing | Ferrari 296 GT3 | 74 | (United States) Dustin Blattner | B | 3 |
| Ferrari | (Switzerland) Kessel Racing | Ferrari 296 GT3 | 74 | (Denmark) Conrad Laursen | B | 3 |
| Ferrari | (Switzerland) Kessel Racing | Ferrari 296 GT3 | 74 | (Germany) Dennis Marschall | B | 3 |
| Ferrari | (Switzerland) Kessel Racing | Ferrari 296 GT3 | 74 | (Canada) Zacharie Robichon | B | 3 |
| Ferrari | (Germany) Rinaldi Racing (Note: Car No. 12 entered as Rinaldi Racing, and car No. 45 entered as Realize Kondo Racing with Rinaldi.) (Japan) Realize Kondo Racing with Rinaldi | Ferrari 296 GT3 | 12 | (Germany) Felipe Fernández Laser | B | 3 |
| Ferrari | (Germany) Rinaldi Racing (Japan) Realize Kondo Racing with Rinaldi | Ferrari 296 GT3 | 12 | (Germany) Christian Hook | B | 3 |
| Ferrari | (Germany) Rinaldi Racing (Japan) Realize Kondo Racing with Rinaldi | Ferrari 296 GT3 | 12 | (South Africa) David Perel | B | 3 |
| Ferrari | (Germany) Rinaldi Racing (Japan) Realize Kondo Racing with Rinaldi | Ferrari 296 GT3 | 12 | (Italy) Davide Rigon | B | 3 |
| Ferrari | (Germany) Rinaldi Racing (Japan) Realize Kondo Racing with Rinaldi | Ferrari 296 GT3 | 45 | (Zimbabwe) Axcil Jefferies | P | 2 |
| Ferrari | (Germany) Rinaldi Racing (Japan) Realize Kondo Racing with Rinaldi | Ferrari 296 GT3 | 45 | (Germany) Felipe Fernández Laser | P | 2 |
| Ferrari | (Germany) Rinaldi Racing (Japan) Realize Kondo Racing with Rinaldi | Ferrari 296 GT3 | 45 | (France) Thomas Neubauer | P | 2 |
| Ferrari | (Germany) Rinaldi Racing (Japan) Realize Kondo Racing with Rinaldi | Ferrari 296 GT3 | 45 | (South Africa) David Perel | P | 2 |
| Ferrari | (China) Harmony Racing | Ferrari 296 GT3 | 21 | (United States) Dustin Blattner | B | 4 |
| Ferrari | (China) Harmony Racing | Ferrari 296 GT3 | 21 | (Germany) Dennis Marschall | B | 4 |
| Ferrari | (China) Harmony Racing | Ferrari 296 GT3 | 21 | (Italy) Lorenzo Patrese | B | 4 |
| Ferrari | (Australia) Arise Racing GT | Ferrari 296 GT3 | 26 | (Australia) Will Brown | P | 1 |
| Ferrari | (Australia) Arise Racing GT | Ferrari 296 GT3 | 26 | (Australia) Chaz Mostert | P | 1 |
| Ferrari | (Australia) Arise Racing GT | Ferrari 296 GT3 | 26 | (Brazil) Daniel Serra | P | 1 |
| Ferrari | (Australia) Arise Racing GT | Ferrari 296 GT3 | 36 | (New Zealand) Jaxon Evans | PA | 1 |
| Ferrari | (Australia) Arise Racing GT | Ferrari 296 GT3 | 36 | (Italy) Alessio Rovera | PA | 1 |
| Ferrari | (Australia) Arise Racing GT | Ferrari 296 GT3 | 36 | (Australia) Brad Schumacher | PA | 1 |
| Ferrari | (Australia) Arise Racing GT | Ferrari 296 GT3 | 36 | (Australia) Elliot Schutte | PA | 1 |
| Ferrari | (Japan) PONOS Racing | Ferrari 296 GT3 | 45 | (Japan) Kei Cozzolino | PA | 4 |
| Ferrari | (Japan) PONOS Racing | Ferrari 296 GT3 | 45 | (Japan) Yorikatsu Tsujiko | PA | 4 |
| Ferrari | (Japan) PONOS Racing | Ferrari 296 GT3 | 45 | (Japan) Yusuke Yamasaki | PA | 4 |
| Ferrari | (Italy) AF Corse USA (Note: Car No. 16 and No. 163 entered as AF Corse USA, car No. 50, No. 51 and No. 52 entered as AF Corse - Francorchamps Motors, car No. 70 and No. 71 entered as AF Corse, and car No. 93 entered as Ziggo Sport - Tempesta.) (Italy) AF Corse - Francorchamps Motors (Italy) AF Corse (United Kingdom) Ziggo Sport – Tempesta | Ferrari 296 GT3 | 16 | (Brazil) Christian Hahn | PA | 5 |
| Ferrari | (Italy) AF Corse USA (Italy) AF Corse - Francorchamps Motors (Italy) AF Corse (United Kingdom) Ziggo Sport – Tempesta | Ferrari 296 GT3 | 16 | (Brazil) Marcelo Hahn | PA | 5 |
| Ferrari | (Italy) AF Corse USA (Italy) AF Corse - Francorchamps Motors (Italy) AF Corse (United Kingdom) Ziggo Sport – Tempesta | Ferrari 296 GT3 | 16 | (Brazil) Allam Khodair | PA | 5 |
| Ferrari | (Italy) AF Corse USA (Italy) AF Corse - Francorchamps Motors (Italy) AF Corse (United Kingdom) Ziggo Sport – Tempesta | Ferrari 296 GT3 | 50 | (Italy) Eliseo Donno | P | 3 |
| Ferrari | (Italy) AF Corse USA (Italy) AF Corse - Francorchamps Motors (Italy) AF Corse (United Kingdom) Ziggo Sport – Tempesta | Ferrari 296 GT3 | 50 | (Italy) Antonio Fuoco | P | 3 |
| Ferrari | (Italy) AF Corse USA (Italy) AF Corse - Francorchamps Motors (Italy) AF Corse (United Kingdom) Ziggo Sport – Tempesta | Ferrari 296 GT3 | 50 | (Monaco) Arthur Leclerc | P | 3 |
| Ferrari | (Italy) AF Corse USA (Italy) AF Corse - Francorchamps Motors (Italy) AF Corse (United Kingdom) Ziggo Sport – Tempesta | Ferrari 296 GT3 | 51 | (Monaco) Vincent Abril | P | 3 |
| Ferrari | (Italy) AF Corse USA (Italy) AF Corse - Francorchamps Motors (Italy) AF Corse (United Kingdom) Ziggo Sport – Tempesta | Ferrari 296 GT3 | 51 | (Italy) Alessandro Pier Guidi | P | 3 |
| Ferrari | (Italy) AF Corse USA (Italy) AF Corse - Francorchamps Motors (Italy) AF Corse (United Kingdom) Ziggo Sport – Tempesta | Ferrari 296 GT3 | 51 | (Italy) Alessio Rovera | P | 3 |
| Ferrari | (Italy) AF Corse USA (Italy) AF Corse - Francorchamps Motors (Italy) AF Corse (United Kingdom) Ziggo Sport – Tempesta | Ferrari 296 GT3 | 52 | (Belgium) Jef Machiels | B | 3 |
| Ferrari | (Italy) AF Corse USA (Italy) AF Corse - Francorchamps Motors (Italy) AF Corse (United Kingdom) Ziggo Sport – Tempesta | Ferrari 296 GT3 | 52 | (Belgium) Louis Machiels | B | 3 |
| Ferrari | (Italy) AF Corse USA (Italy) AF Corse - Francorchamps Motors (Italy) AF Corse (United Kingdom) Ziggo Sport – Tempesta | Ferrari 296 GT3 | 52 | (Italy) Tommaso Mosca | B | 3 |
| Ferrari | (Italy) AF Corse USA (Italy) AF Corse - Francorchamps Motors (Italy) AF Corse (United Kingdom) Ziggo Sport – Tempesta | Ferrari 296 GT3 | 52 | (Argentina) Marcos Siebert | B | 3 |
| Ferrari | (Italy) AF Corse USA (Italy) AF Corse - Francorchamps Motors (Italy) AF Corse (United Kingdom) Ziggo Sport – Tempesta | Ferrari 296 GT3 | 70 | (Italy) Riccardo Agostini | PA | 3 |
| Ferrari | (Italy) AF Corse USA (Italy) AF Corse - Francorchamps Motors (Italy) AF Corse (United Kingdom) Ziggo Sport – Tempesta | Ferrari 296 GT3 | 70 | (United Kingdom) Matt Bell | PA | 3 |
| Ferrari | (Italy) AF Corse USA (Italy) AF Corse - Francorchamps Motors (Italy) AF Corse (United Kingdom) Ziggo Sport – Tempesta | Ferrari 296 GT3 | 70 | (United States) Blake McDonald | PA | 3 |
| Ferrari | (Italy) AF Corse USA (Italy) AF Corse - Francorchamps Motors (Italy) AF Corse (United Kingdom) Ziggo Sport – Tempesta | Ferrari 296 GT3 | 70 | (Brazil) Custodio Toledo | PA | 3 |
| Ferrari | (Italy) AF Corse USA (Italy) AF Corse - Francorchamps Motors (Italy) AF Corse (United Kingdom) Ziggo Sport – Tempesta | Ferrari 296 GT3 | 71 | (Belgium) Stéphane Lémeret | PA | 3 |
| Ferrari | (Italy) AF Corse USA (Italy) AF Corse - Francorchamps Motors (Italy) AF Corse (United Kingdom) Ziggo Sport – Tempesta | Ferrari 296 GT3 | 71 | (Spain) Miguel Molina | PA | 3 |
| Ferrari | (Italy) AF Corse USA (Italy) AF Corse - Francorchamps Motors (Italy) AF Corse (United Kingdom) Ziggo Sport – Tempesta | Ferrari 296 GT3 | 71 | (Argentina) Luis Pérez Companc | PA | 3 |
| Ferrari | (Italy) AF Corse USA (Italy) AF Corse - Francorchamps Motors (Italy) AF Corse (United Kingdom) Ziggo Sport – Tempesta | Ferrari 296 GT3 | 71 | (Argentina) Matías Pérez Companc | PA | 3 |
| Ferrari | (Italy) AF Corse USA (Italy) AF Corse - Francorchamps Motors (Italy) AF Corse (United Kingdom) Ziggo Sport – Tempesta | Ferrari 296 GT3 | 93 | (Italy) Eddie Cheever III | B | 3 |
| Ferrari | (Italy) AF Corse USA (Italy) AF Corse - Francorchamps Motors (Italy) AF Corse (United Kingdom) Ziggo Sport – Tempesta | Ferrari 296 GT3 | 93 | (United Kingdom) Chris Froggatt | B | 3 |
| Ferrari | (Italy) AF Corse USA (Italy) AF Corse - Francorchamps Motors (Italy) AF Corse (United Kingdom) Ziggo Sport – Tempesta | Ferrari 296 GT3 | 93 | (Hong Kong) Jonathan Hui | B | 3 |
| Ferrari | (Italy) AF Corse USA (Italy) AF Corse - Francorchamps Motors (Italy) AF Corse (United Kingdom) Ziggo Sport – Tempesta | Ferrari 296 GT3 | 93 | (Italy) Lorenzo Patrese | B | 3 |
| Ferrari | (Italy) AF Corse USA (Italy) AF Corse - Francorchamps Motors (Italy) AF Corse (United Kingdom) Ziggo Sport – Tempesta | Ferrari 296 GT3 | 163 | (United States) Conrad Grunewald | Am | 5 |
| Ferrari | (Italy) AF Corse USA (Italy) AF Corse - Francorchamps Motors (Italy) AF Corse (United Kingdom) Ziggo Sport – Tempesta | Ferrari 296 GT3 | 163 | (Brazil) Oswaldo Negri Jr. | Am | 5 |
| Ferrari | (Italy) AF Corse USA (Italy) AF Corse - Francorchamps Motors (Italy) AF Corse (United Kingdom) Ziggo Sport – Tempesta | Ferrari 296 GT3 | 163 | (United States) Jay Schreibman | Am | 5 |
| Ferrari | (Japan) LM corsa | Ferrari 296 GT3 | 60 | (Italy) Giancarlo Fisichella | PA | 4 |
| Ferrari | (Japan) LM corsa | Ferrari 296 GT3 | 60 | (Japan) Kei Nakanishi | PA | 4 |
| Ferrari | (Japan) LM corsa | Ferrari 296 GT3 | 60 | (Japan) Shigekazu Wakisaka | PA | 4 |
| Ferrari | (Japan) K-tunes Racing | Ferrari 296 GT3 | 98 | (Japan) Shinichi Takagi | B | 4 |
| Ferrari | (Japan) K-tunes Racing | Ferrari 296 GT3 | 98 | (United Kingdom) Sean Walkinshaw | B | 4 |
| Ferrari | (Japan) K-tunes Racing | Ferrari 296 GT3 | 98 | (Japan) Daisuke Yamawaki | B | 4 |
| Ferrari | (Japan) Maezawa Racing | Ferrari 296 GT3 | 555 | (Japan) Yusaku Maezawa | B | 4 |
| Ferrari | (Japan) Maezawa Racing | Ferrari 296 GT3 | 555 | (France) Thomas Neubauer | B | 4 |
| Ferrari | (Japan) Maezawa Racing | Ferrari 296 GT3 | 555 | (Japan) Naoki Yokomizo | B | 4 |
| Mercedes-AMG | (Japan) Goodsmile Racing | Mercedes-AMG GT3 Evo | 00 | (Japan) Tatsuya Kataoka | P | 3–4 |
| Mercedes-AMG | (Japan) Goodsmile Racing | Mercedes-AMG GT3 Evo | 00 | (Japan) Kamui Kobayashi | P | 3–4 |
| Mercedes-AMG | (Japan) Goodsmile Racing | Mercedes-AMG GT3 Evo | 00 | (Japan) Nobuteru Taniguchi | P | 3–4 |
| Mercedes-AMG | (United States) Crowdstrike by Riley | Mercedes-AMG GT3 Evo | 04 | (United States) Colin Braun | PA | 5 |
| Mercedes-AMG | (United States) Crowdstrike by Riley | Mercedes-AMG GT3 Evo | 04 | (United States) George Kurtz | PA | 5 |
| Mercedes-AMG | (United States) Crowdstrike by Riley | Mercedes-AMG GT3 Evo | 04 | (United Kingdom) Toby Sowery | PA | 5 |
| Mercedes-AMG | (Germany) / GetSpeed (Note: Car No. 3, No. 6 and No. 69 entered as GetSpeed, and car No. 14 & 17 entered as Mercedes-AMG Team GetSpeed.); (Germany) / Mercedes-AMG Team GetSpeed | Mercedes-AMG GT3 Evo | 3 | (United States) Anthony Bartone | S | 3 |
| Mercedes-AMG | (Germany) / GetSpeed; (Germany) / Mercedes-AMG Team GetSpeed | Mercedes-AMG GT3 Evo | 3 | (Poland) Karol Basz | S | 3 |
| Mercedes-AMG | (Germany) / GetSpeed; (Germany) / Mercedes-AMG Team GetSpeed | Mercedes-AMG GT3 Evo | 3 | (Germany) Tom Kalender | S | 3 |
| Mercedes-AMG | (Germany) / GetSpeed; (Germany) / Mercedes-AMG Team GetSpeed | Mercedes-AMG GT3 Evo | 3 | (Switzerland) Yannick Mettler | S | 3 |
| Mercedes-AMG | (Germany) / GetSpeed; (Germany) / Mercedes-AMG Team GetSpeed | Mercedes-AMG GT3 Evo | 6 | (Netherlands) Colin Caresani | S | 3 |
| Mercedes-AMG | (Germany) / GetSpeed; (Germany) / Mercedes-AMG Team GetSpeed | Mercedes-AMG GT3 Evo | 6 | (Netherlands) Lin Hodenius | S | 3 |
| Mercedes-AMG | (Germany) / GetSpeed; (Germany) / Mercedes-AMG Team GetSpeed | Mercedes-AMG GT3 Evo | 6 | (Thailand) Tanart Sathienthirakul | S | 3 |
| Mercedes-AMG | (Germany) / GetSpeed; (Germany) / Mercedes-AMG Team GetSpeed | Mercedes-AMG GT3 Evo | 6 | (United Kingdom) Aaron Walker | S | 3 |
| Mercedes-AMG | (Germany) / GetSpeed; (Germany) / Mercedes-AMG Team GetSpeed | Mercedes-AMG GT3 Evo | 14 | (Germany) Maro Engel | P | 2 |
| Mercedes-AMG | (Germany) / GetSpeed; (Germany) / Mercedes-AMG Team GetSpeed | Mercedes-AMG GT3 Evo | 14 | (Belgium) Maxime Martin | P | 2 |
| Mercedes-AMG | (Germany) / GetSpeed; (Germany) / Mercedes-AMG Team GetSpeed | Mercedes-AMG GT3 Evo | 14 | (Germany) Luca Stolz | P | 2 |
| Mercedes-AMG | (Germany) / GetSpeed; (Germany) / Mercedes-AMG Team GetSpeed | Mercedes-AMG GT3 Evo | 14 | (Germany) Fabian Schiller | P | 2 |
| Mercedes-AMG | (Germany) / GetSpeed; (Germany) / Mercedes-AMG Team GetSpeed | Mercedes-AMG GT3 Evo | 17 | (Germany) Fabian Schiller | P | 3 |
| Mercedes-AMG | (Germany) / GetSpeed; (Germany) / Mercedes-AMG Team GetSpeed | Mercedes-AMG GT3 Evo | 17 | (Estonia) Ralf Aron | P | 2 |
| Mercedes-AMG | (Germany) / GetSpeed; (Germany) / Mercedes-AMG Team GetSpeed | Mercedes-AMG GT3 Evo | 17 | (Austria) Lucas Auer | P | 2 |
| Mercedes-AMG | (Germany) / GetSpeed; (Germany) / Mercedes-AMG Team GetSpeed | Mercedes-AMG GT3 Evo | 17 | (United Kingdom) Adam Christodoulou | P | 2 |
| Mercedes-AMG | (Germany) / GetSpeed; (Germany) / Mercedes-AMG Team GetSpeed | Mercedes-AMG GT3 Evo | 17 | (Canada) Mikaël Grenier | P | 2 |
| Mercedes-AMG | (Germany) / GetSpeed; (Germany) / Mercedes-AMG Team GetSpeed | Mercedes-AMG GT3 Evo | 17 | (Andorra) Jules Gounon | P | 3 |
| Mercedes-AMG | (Germany) / GetSpeed; (Germany) / Mercedes-AMG Team GetSpeed | Mercedes-AMG GT3 Evo | 17 | (Germany) Luca Stolz | P | 3 |
| Mercedes-AMG | (Germany) / GetSpeed; (Germany) / Mercedes-AMG Team GetSpeed | Mercedes-AMG GT3 Evo | 69 | (Switzerland) Philip Ellis | PA | 4 |
| Mercedes-AMG | (Germany) / GetSpeed; (Germany) / Mercedes-AMG Team GetSpeed | Mercedes-AMG GT3 Evo | 69 | (Luxembourg) Steve Jans | PA | 4 |
| Mercedes-AMG | (Germany) / GetSpeed; (Germany) / Mercedes-AMG Team GetSpeed | Mercedes-AMG GT3 Evo | 69 | (United States) Anthony McIntosh | PA | 4 |
| Mercedes-AMG | (Australia) Grove Racing | Mercedes-AMG GT3 Evo | 4 | (Australia) Stephen Grove | B | 1 |
| Mercedes-AMG | (Australia) Grove Racing | Mercedes-AMG GT3 Evo | 4 | (Australia) Brenton Grove | B | 1 |
| Mercedes-AMG | (Australia) Grove Racing | Mercedes-AMG GT3 Evo | 4 | (Germany) Fabian Schiller | B | 1 |
| Mercedes-AMG | (United States) / CrowdStrike by SPS (Note: Car No. 4 entered as CrowdStrike by SPS and car No. 27 entered as Heart of Racing by SPS.); (United States) / Heart of Racing by SPS | Mercedes-AMG GT3 Evo | 4 | (United States) Colin Braun | PA | 3 |
| Mercedes-AMG | (United States) / CrowdStrike by SPS; (United States) / Heart of Racing by SPS | Mercedes-AMG GT3 Evo | 4 | (Netherlands) Nicky Catsburg | PA | 3 |
| Mercedes-AMG | (United States) / CrowdStrike by SPS; (United States) / Heart of Racing by SPS | Mercedes-AMG GT3 Evo | 4 | (United States) George Kurtz | PA | 3 |
| Mercedes-AMG | (United States) / CrowdStrike by SPS; (United States) / Heart of Racing by SPS | Mercedes-AMG GT3 Evo | 4 | (United States) Ian James | PA | 3 |
| Mercedes-AMG | (United States) / CrowdStrike by SPS; (United States) / Heart of Racing by SPS | Mercedes-AMG GT3 Evo | 27 | (United States) Ian James | B | 1, 4 |
| Mercedes-AMG | (United States) / CrowdStrike by SPS; (United States) / Heart of Racing by SPS | Mercedes-AMG GT3 Evo | 27 | (United Kingdom) Ross Gunn | B | 1 |
| Mercedes-AMG | (United States) / CrowdStrike by SPS; (United States) / Heart of Racing by SPS | Mercedes-AMG GT3 Evo | 27 | (Canada) Zacharie Robichon | B | 1, 4 |
| Mercedes-AMG | (United States) / CrowdStrike by SPS; (United States) / Heart of Racing by SPS | Mercedes-AMG GT3 Evo | 27 | (Spain) Alex Riberas | B | 4 |
| Mercedes-AMG | (Belgium) Boutsen VDS | Mercedes-AMG GT3 Evo | 9 | (Germany) Maximilian Götz | P | 3 |
| Mercedes-AMG | (Belgium) Boutsen VDS | Mercedes-AMG GT3 Evo | 9 | (Canada) Mikaël Grenier | P | 3 |
| Mercedes-AMG | (Belgium) Boutsen VDS | Mercedes-AMG GT3 Evo | 9 | (Belgium) Maxime Martin | P | 3 |
| Mercedes-AMG | (Belgium) Boutsen VDS | Mercedes-AMG GT3 Evo | 10 | (France) Loris Cabirou | S | 3 |
| Mercedes-AMG | (Belgium) Boutsen VDS | Mercedes-AMG GT3 Evo | 10 | (France) César Gazeau | S | 3 |
| Mercedes-AMG | (Belgium) Boutsen VDS | Mercedes-AMG GT3 Evo | 10 | (France) Aurélien Panis | S | 3 |
| Mercedes-AMG | (Belgium) Boutsen VDS | Mercedes-AMG GT3 Evo | 10 | (United Kingdom) Hugo Cook | S | 3 |
| Mercedes-AMG | (Germany) SR Motorsport by Schnitzelalm | Mercedes-AMG GT3 Evo | 11 | (Germany) Christopher Brück | PA | 2 |
| Mercedes-AMG | (Germany) SR Motorsport by Schnitzelalm | Mercedes-AMG GT3 Evo | 11 | (Germany) Jannes Fittje | PA | 2 |
| Mercedes-AMG | (Germany) SR Motorsport by Schnitzelalm | Mercedes-AMG GT3 Evo | 11 | (Germany) Jay Mo Härtling | PA | 2 |
| Mercedes-AMG | (Germany) SR Motorsport by Schnitzelalm | Mercedes-AMG GT3 Evo | 11 | (Germany) Kenneth Heyer | PA | 2 |
| Mercedes-AMG | (Hong Kong) / Craft-Bamboo Racing (Note: Car No. 28 entered as Craft-Bamboo Racing and car No. 77 entered as Mercedes-AMG Team Craft-Bamboo Racing.); (Hong Kong) / Mercedes-AMG Team Craft-Bamboo Racing | Mercedes-AMG GT3 Evo | 28 | (United Kingdom) Ben Barnicoat | PA | 4 |
| Mercedes-AMG | (Hong Kong) / Craft-Bamboo Racing; (Hong Kong) / Mercedes-AMG Team Craft-Bamboo Racing | Mercedes-AMG GT3 Evo | 28 | (Hong Kong) Jonathan Hui | PA | 4 |
| Mercedes-AMG | (Hong Kong) / Craft-Bamboo Racing; (Hong Kong) / Mercedes-AMG Team Craft-Bamboo Racing | Mercedes-AMG GT3 Evo | 28 | (Hong Kong) Kevin Tse | PA | 4 |
| Mercedes-AMG | (Hong Kong) / Craft-Bamboo Racing; (Hong Kong) / Mercedes-AMG Team Craft-Bamboo Racing | Mercedes-AMG GT3 Evo | 77 | (Germany) Maximilian Götz | P | 1, 4 |
| Mercedes-AMG | (Hong Kong) / Craft-Bamboo Racing; (Hong Kong) / Mercedes-AMG Team Craft-Bamboo Racing | Mercedes-AMG GT3 Evo | 77 | (Austria) Lucas Auer | P | 1 |
| Mercedes-AMG | (Hong Kong) / Craft-Bamboo Racing; (Hong Kong) / Mercedes-AMG Team Craft-Bamboo Racing | Mercedes-AMG GT3 Evo | 77 | (Australia) Jayden Ojeda | P | 1 |
| Mercedes-AMG | (Hong Kong) / Craft-Bamboo Racing; (Hong Kong) / Mercedes-AMG Team Craft-Bamboo Racing | Mercedes-AMG GT3 Evo | 77 | (Estonia) Ralf Aron | P | 4 |
| Mercedes-AMG | (Hong Kong) / Craft-Bamboo Racing; (Hong Kong) / Mercedes-AMG Team Craft-Bamboo Racing | Mercedes-AMG GT3 Evo | 77 | (Japan) Kakunoshin Ohta | P | 4 |
| Mercedes-AMG | (Canada) JMF Motorsports | Mercedes-AMG GT3 Evo | 34 | (Austria) Lucas Auer | P | 5 |
| Mercedes-AMG | (Canada) JMF Motorsports | Mercedes-AMG GT3 Evo | 34 | (Canada) Mikaël Grenier | P | 5 |
| Mercedes-AMG | (Canada) JMF Motorsports | Mercedes-AMG GT3 Evo | 34 | (United States) Michai Stephens | P | 5 |
| Mercedes-AMG | (Australia) Supabarn Tigani Motorsport | Mercedes-AMG GT3 Evo | 47 | (Australia) James Koundouris | S | 1 |
| Mercedes-AMG | (Australia) Supabarn Tigani Motorsport | Mercedes-AMG GT3 Evo | 47 | (Australia) Theo Koundouris | S | 1 |
| Mercedes-AMG | (Australia) Supabarn Tigani Motorsport | Mercedes-AMG GT3 Evo | 47 | (Australia) David Russell | S | 1 |
| Mercedes-AMG | (Australia) Supabarn Tigani Motorsport | Mercedes-AMG GT3 Evo | 47 | (Australia) Luke Youlden | S | 1 |
| Mercedes-AMG | (United States) / Mercedes-AMG Team Mann-Filter (Note: Car No. 48 entered as Mercedes-AMG Mann-Filter, and car No. 57 & No. 81 entered as Winward Racing.); (United States) / Winward Racing | Mercedes-AMG GT3 Evo | 48 | (Austria) Lucas Auer | P | 3 |
| Mercedes-AMG | (United States) / Mercedes-AMG Team Mann-Filter; (United States) / Winward Racing | Mercedes-AMG GT3 Evo | 48 | (Italy) Matteo Cairoli | P | 3 |
| Mercedes-AMG | (United States) / Mercedes-AMG Team Mann-Filter; (United States) / Winward Racing | Mercedes-AMG GT3 Evo | 48 | (Germany) Maro Engel | P | 3 |
| Mercedes-AMG | (United States) / Mercedes-AMG Team Mann-Filter; (United States) / Winward Racing | Mercedes-AMG GT3 Evo | 57 | (Netherlands) Indy Dontje | G | 3 |
| Mercedes-AMG | (United States) / Mercedes-AMG Team Mann-Filter; (United States) / Winward Racing | Mercedes-AMG GT3 Evo | 57 | (Switzerland) Philip Ellis | G | 3 |
| Mercedes-AMG | (United States) / Mercedes-AMG Team Mann-Filter; (United States) / Winward Racing | Mercedes-AMG GT3 Evo | 57 | (Canada) Daniel Morad | G | 3 |
| Mercedes-AMG | (United States) / Mercedes-AMG Team Mann-Filter; (United States) / Winward Racing | Mercedes-AMG GT3 Evo | 57 | (United States) Russell Ward | G | 3 |
| Mercedes-AMG | (United States) / Mercedes-AMG Team Mann-Filter; (United States) / Winward Racing | Mercedes-AMG GT3 Evo | 81 | (Germany) Marvin Dienst | B | 3 |
| Mercedes-AMG | (United States) / Mercedes-AMG Team Mann-Filter; (United States) / Winward Racing | Mercedes-AMG GT3 Evo | 81 | (Italy) Gabriele Piana | B | 3 |
| Mercedes-AMG | (United States) / Mercedes-AMG Team Mann-Filter; (United States) / Winward Racing | Mercedes-AMG GT3 Evo | 81 | (Armenia) Rinat Salikhov | B | 3 |
| Mercedes-AMG | (United States) / Mercedes-AMG Team Mann-Filter; (United States) / Winward Racing | Mercedes-AMG GT3 Evo | 81 | (Netherlands) "Daan Arrow" | B | 3 |
| Mercedes-AMG | (Australia) 75 Express | Mercedes-AMG GT3 Evo | 75 | (Andorra) Jules Gounon | P | 1 |
| Mercedes-AMG | (Australia) 75 Express | Mercedes-AMG GT3 Evo | 75 | (Australia) Kenny Habul | P | 1 |
| Mercedes-AMG | (Australia) 75 Express | Mercedes-AMG GT3 Evo | 75 | (Germany) Luca Stolz | P | 1 |
| Mercedes-AMG | (Australia) 75 Express | Mercedes-AMG GT3 Evo | 75 | (Austria) Dominik Baumann | B | 4 |
| Mercedes-AMG | (Australia) 75 Express | Mercedes-AMG GT3 Evo | 75 | (Switzerland) Yannick Mettler | B | 4 |
| Mercedes-AMG | (Australia) 75 Express | Mercedes-AMG GT3 Evo | 75 | (Australia) Kenny Habul | B | 4 |
| Mercedes-AMG | (Australia) 75 Express | Mercedes-AMG GT3 Evo | 75 | (Australia) Kenny Habul | PA | 5 |
| Mercedes-AMG | (Australia) 75 Express | Mercedes-AMG GT3 Evo | 75 | (Australia) Chaz Mostert | PA | 5 |
| Mercedes-AMG | (Australia) 75 Express | Mercedes-AMG GT3 Evo | 75 | (Australia) Will Power | PA | 5 |
| Mercedes-AMG | (United States) Mercedes-AMG Lone Star Racing | Mercedes-AMG GT3 Evo | 80 | (Andorra) Jules Gounon | P | 5 |
| Mercedes-AMG | (United States) Mercedes-AMG Lone Star Racing | Mercedes-AMG GT3 Evo | 80 | (Netherlands) Lin Hodenius | P | 5 |
| Mercedes-AMG | (United States) Mercedes-AMG Lone Star Racing | Mercedes-AMG GT3 Evo | 80 | (Belgium) Maxime Martin | P | 5 |
| Mercedes-AMG | (United States) Regulator Racing | Mercedes-AMG GT3 Evo | 91 | (Netherlands) "Daan Arrow" | PA | 5 |
| Mercedes-AMG | (United States) Regulator Racing | Mercedes-AMG GT3 Evo | 91 | (United States) Jeff Burton | PA | 5 |
| Mercedes-AMG | (United States) Regulator Racing | Mercedes-AMG GT3 Evo | 91 | (Switzerland) Philip Ellis | PA | 5 |
| Mercedes-AMG | (Australia) Scott Taylor Motorsport | Mercedes-AMG GT3 Evo | 222 | (Australia) Craig Lowndes | P | 1 |
| Mercedes-AMG | (Australia) Scott Taylor Motorsport | Mercedes-AMG GT3 Evo | 222 | (Australia) Thomas Randle | P | 1 |
| Mercedes-AMG | (Australia) Scott Taylor Motorsport | Mercedes-AMG GT3 Evo | 222 | (Australia) Cameron Waters | P | 1 |
| Mercedes-AMG | (Bahrain) 2 Seas Motorsport | Mercedes-AMG GT3 Evo | 222 | (United Kingdom) Charles Dawson | B | 3 |
| Mercedes-AMG | (Bahrain) 2 Seas Motorsport | Mercedes-AMG GT3 Evo | 222 | (United Kingdom) Kiern Jewiss | B | 3 |
| Mercedes-AMG | (Bahrain) 2 Seas Motorsport | Mercedes-AMG GT3 Evo | 222 | (Canada) Parker Thompson | B | 3 |
| Mercedes-AMG | (Bahrain) 2 Seas Motorsport | Mercedes-AMG GT3 Evo | 222 | (United Kingdom) Lewis Williamson | B | 3 |
| Mercedes-AMG | (Germany) Nordique Racing | Mercedes-AMG GT3 Evo | 611 | (Japan) Kazuto Kotaka | G | 3 |
| Mercedes-AMG | (Germany) Nordique Racing | Mercedes-AMG GT3 Evo | 611 | (Italy) Edoardo Liberati | G | 3 |
| Mercedes-AMG | (Germany) Nordique Racing | Mercedes-AMG GT3 Evo | 611 | (Japan) Yuichi Nakayama | G | 3 |
| Mercedes-AMG | (Germany) Nordique Racing | Mercedes-AMG GT3 Evo | 611 | (Germany) Tim Sandtler | G | 3 |
| Mercedes-AMG | (Hong Kong) Mercedes-AMG Team GMR | Mercedes-AMG GT3 Evo | 888 | (Canada) Mikaël Grenier | P | 1, 4 |
| Mercedes-AMG | (Hong Kong) Mercedes-AMG Team GMR | Mercedes-AMG GT3 Evo | 888 | (Belgium) Maxime Martin | P | 1, 4 |
| Mercedes-AMG | (Hong Kong) Mercedes-AMG Team GMR | Mercedes-AMG GT3 Evo | 888 | (Germany) Maro Engel | P | 1, 5 |
| Mercedes-AMG | (Hong Kong) Mercedes-AMG Team GMR | Mercedes-AMG GT3 Evo | 888 | (Germany) Luca Stolz | P | 4–5 |
| Mercedes-AMG | (Hong Kong) Mercedes-AMG Team GMR | Mercedes-AMG GT3 Evo | 888 | (Germany) Tom Kalender | P | 5 |
| Porsche | (Australia) AMAC Motorsport | Porsche 911 GT3 R (991.2) | 55 | (Australia) Grant Denyer | Am | 4 |
| Porsche | (Australia) AMAC Motorsport | Porsche 911 GT3 R (991.2) | 55 | (Australia) Andrew Macpherson | Am | 4 |
| Porsche | (Australia) AMAC Motorsport | Porsche 911 GT3 R (991.2) | 55 | (Australia) William Ben Porter | Am | 4 |
| Porsche | (China) Origine Motorsport | Porsche 911 GT3 R (992) | 6 | (Denmark) Bastian Buus | P | 4 |
| Porsche | (China) Origine Motorsport | Porsche 911 GT3 R (992) | 6 | (Germany) Laurin Heinrich | P | 4 |
| Porsche | (China) Origine Motorsport | Porsche 911 GT3 R (992) | 6 | (Belgium) Alessio Picariello | P | 4 |
| Porsche | (China) Origine Motorsport | Porsche 911 GT3 R (992) | 86 | (Denmark) Anders Fjordbach | B | 4 |
| Porsche | (China) Origine Motorsport | Porsche 911 GT3 R (992) | 86 | (China) Kerong Li | B | 4 |
| Porsche | (China) Origine Motorsport | Porsche 911 GT3 R (992) | 86 | (China) Leo Ye Hongli | B | 4 |
| Porsche | (Hong Kong) Absolute Racing | Porsche 911 GT3 R (992) | 7 | (France) Kévin Estre | P | 4 |
| Porsche | (Hong Kong) Absolute Racing | Porsche 911 GT3 R (992) | 7 | (France) Patrick Pilet | P | 4 |
| Porsche | (Hong Kong) Absolute Racing | Porsche 911 GT3 R (992) | 7 | (Belgium) Laurens Vanthoor | P | 4 |
| Porsche | (Hong Kong) Absolute Racing | Porsche 911 GT3 R (992) | 10 | (Hong Kong) Antares Au | B | 4 |
| Porsche | (Hong Kong) Absolute Racing | Porsche 911 GT3 R (992) | 10 | (Netherlands) Loek Hartog | B | 4 |
| Porsche | (Hong Kong) Absolute Racing | Porsche 911 GT3 R (992) | 10 | (Austria) Richard Lietz | B | 4 |
| Porsche | (Hong Kong) Absolute Racing | Porsche 911 GT3 R (992) | 911 | (Australia) Matt Campbell | P | 1 |
| Porsche | (Hong Kong) Absolute Racing | Porsche 911 GT3 R (992) | 911 | (Turkey) Ayhancan Güven | P | 1 |
| Porsche | (Hong Kong) Absolute Racing | Porsche 911 GT3 R (992) | 911 | (Belgium) Alessio Picariello | P | 1 |
| Porsche | (Germany) / Herberth Motorsport (Note: Car No. 7, 91 and 92 entered as Herberth Motorsport and car No. 21 entered as Blattner Company by Herberth Motorsport); (Germany) / Blattner Company by Herberth Motorsport | Porsche 911 GT3 R (992) | 7 | (Germany) Ralf Bohn | PA | 5 |
| Porsche | (Germany) / Herberth Motorsport; (Germany) / Blattner Company by Herberth Motorsport | Porsche 911 GT3 R (992) | 7 | (Switzerland) Rolf Ineichen | PA | 5 |
| Porsche | (Germany) / Herberth Motorsport; (Germany) / Blattner Company by Herberth Motorsport | Porsche 911 GT3 R (992) | 7 | (Germany) Robert Renauer | PA | 5 |
| Porsche | (Germany) / Herberth Motorsport; (Germany) / Blattner Company by Herberth Motorsport | Porsche 911 GT3 R (992) | 21 | (United States) Dustin Blattner | PA | 5 |
| Porsche | (Germany) / Herberth Motorsport; (Germany) / Blattner Company by Herberth Motorsport | Porsche 911 GT3 R (992) | 21 | (Germany) Dennis Marschall | PA | 5 |
| Porsche | (Germany) / Herberth Motorsport; (Germany) / Blattner Company by Herberth Motorsport | Porsche 911 GT3 R (992) | 21 | (Germany) Alfred Renauer | PA | 5 |
| Porsche | (Germany) / Herberth Motorsport; (Germany) / Blattner Company by Herberth Motorsport | Porsche 911 GT3 R (992) | 91 | (Germany) Alfred Renauer | B | 3–4 |
| Porsche | (Germany) / Herberth Motorsport; (Germany) / Blattner Company by Herberth Motorsport | Porsche 911 GT3 R (992) | 91 | (Germany) Ralf Bohn | B | 3–4 |
| Porsche | (Germany) / Herberth Motorsport; (Germany) / Blattner Company by Herberth Motorsport | Porsche 911 GT3 R (992) | 91 | (Germany) Robert Renauer | B | 3–4 |
| Porsche | (Germany) / Herberth Motorsport; (Germany) / Blattner Company by Herberth Motorsport | Porsche 911 GT3 R (992) | 91 | (Zimbabwe) Axcil Jefferies | B | 3 |
| Porsche | (Germany) / Herberth Motorsport; (Germany) / Blattner Company by Herberth Motorsport | Porsche 911 GT3 R (992) | 92 | (Germany) Tim Heinemann | G | 3 |
| Porsche | (Germany) / Herberth Motorsport; (Germany) / Blattner Company by Herberth Motorsport | Porsche 911 GT3 R (992) | 92 | (Switzerland) Rolf Ineichen | G | 3 |
| Porsche | (Germany) / Herberth Motorsport; (Germany) / Blattner Company by Herberth Motorsport | Porsche 911 GT3 R (992) | 92 | (Germany) Joel Sturm | G | 3 |
| Porsche | (United States) Wright Motorsports | Porsche 911 GT3 R (992) | 10 | (Hong Kong) Antares Au | PA | 5 |
| Porsche | (United States) Wright Motorsports | Porsche 911 GT3 R (992) | 10 | (Netherlands) Loek Hartog | PA | 5 |
| Porsche | (United States) Wright Motorsports | Porsche 911 GT3 R (992) | 10 | (Switzerland) Patric Niederhauser | PA | 5 |
| Porsche | (United States) Wright Motorsports | Porsche 911 GT3 R (992) | 120 | (United States) Elliott Skeer | G | 3 |
| Porsche | (United States) Wright Motorsports | Porsche 911 GT3 R (992) | 120 | (Australia) Tom Sargent | G | 3 |
| Porsche | (United States) Wright Motorsports | Porsche 911 GT3 R (992) | 120 | (United States) Adam Adelson | G | 3 |
| Porsche | (United States) Wright Motorsports | Porsche 911 GT3 R (992) | 120 | (United States) Adam Adelson | P | 5 |
| Porsche | (United States) Wright Motorsports | Porsche 911 GT3 R (992) | 120 | (Germany) Laurin Heinrich | P | 5 |
| Porsche | (United States) Wright Motorsports | Porsche 911 GT3 R (992) | 120 | (United States) Elliott Skeer | P | 5 |
| Porsche | (China) Phantom Global Racing | Porsche 911 GT3 R (992) | 13 | (Hong Kong) Adderly Fong | B | 4 |
| Porsche | (China) Phantom Global Racing | Porsche 911 GT3 R (992) | 13 | (China) Sun Jingzu | B | 4 |
| Porsche | (China) Phantom Global Racing | Porsche 911 GT3 R (992) | 13 | (Germany) Nico Menzel | B | 4 |
| Porsche | (China) Phantom Global Racing | Porsche 911 GT3 R (992) | 23 | (Austria) Klaus Bachler | P | 4 |
| Porsche | (China) Phantom Global Racing | Porsche 911 GT3 R (992) | 23 | (France) Dorian Boccolacci | P | 4 |
| Porsche | (China) Phantom Global Racing | Porsche 911 GT3 R (992) | 23 | (Switzerland) Patric Niederhauser | P | 4 |
| Porsche | (Germany) Scherer Sport PHX | Porsche 911 GT3 R (992) | 16 | (Switzerland) Patric Niederhauser | P | 2 |
| Porsche | (Germany) Scherer Sport PHX | Porsche 911 GT3 R (992) | 16 | (Switzerland) Ricardo Feller | P | 2 |
| Porsche | (Germany) Scherer Sport PHX | Porsche 911 GT3 R (992) | 16 | (Belgium) Laurens Vanthoor | P | 2 |
| Porsche | (Italy) Dinamic GT | Porsche 911 GT3 R (992) | 18 | (Australia) Matt Campbell | P | 3 |
| Porsche | (Italy) Dinamic GT | Porsche 911 GT3 R (992) | 18 | (France) Mathieu Jaminet | P | 3 |
| Porsche | (Italy) Dinamic GT | Porsche 911 GT3 R (992) | 18 | (Denmark) Bastian Buus | P | 3 |
| Porsche | (Italy) Dinamic GT | Porsche 911 GT3 R (992) | 54 | (Denmark) Bastian Buus | P | 2 |
| Porsche | (Italy) Dinamic GT | Porsche 911 GT3 R (992) | 54 | (Italy) Matteo Cairoli | P | 2 |
| Porsche | (Italy) Dinamic GT | Porsche 911 GT3 R (992) | 54 | (Netherlands) Loek Hartog | P | 2 |
| Porsche | (Italy) Dinamic GT | Porsche 911 GT3 R (992) | 54 | (Germany) Joel Sturm | P | 2 |
| Porsche | (Italy) Dinamic GT | Porsche 911 GT3 R (992) | 54 | (United Arab Emirates) Federico Al Rifai | S | 3 |
| Porsche | (Italy) Dinamic GT | Porsche 911 GT3 R (992) | 54 | (France) Sébastien Baud | S | 3 |
| Porsche | (Italy) Dinamic GT | Porsche 911 GT3 R (992) | 54 | (Sri Lanka) Eshan Pieris | S | 3 |
| Porsche | (Italy) Dinamic GT | Porsche 911 GT3 R (992) | 54 | (Netherlands) Jop Rappange | S | 3 |
| Porsche | (Japan) Porsche Center Okazaki Nine Racing | Porsche 911 GT3 R (992) | 18 | (Japan) Kazuto Kotaka | B | 4 |
| Porsche | (Japan) Porsche Center Okazaki Nine Racing | Porsche 911 GT3 R (992) | 18 | (Japan) Hiroaki Nagai | B | 4 |
| Porsche | (Japan) Porsche Center Okazaki Nine Racing | Porsche 911 GT3 R (992) | 18 | (Japan) Takuro Shinohara | B | 4 |
| Porsche | (United States) RS1 | Porsche 911 GT3 R (992) | 18 | (United States) Jan Heylen | P | 5 |
| Porsche | (United States) RS1 | Porsche 911 GT3 R (992) | 18 | (Belgium) Alessio Picariello | P | 5 |
| Porsche | (United States) RS1 | Porsche 911 GT3 R (992) | 18 | (United Kingdom) Alex Sedgwick | P | 5 |
| Porsche | (France) Schumacher CLRT | Porsche 911 GT3 R (992) | 22 | (Austria) Klaus Bachler | P | 3 |
| Porsche | (France) Schumacher CLRT | Porsche 911 GT3 R (992) | 22 | (Turkey) Ayhancan Güven | P | 3 |
| Porsche | (France) Schumacher CLRT | Porsche 911 GT3 R (992) | 22 | (Germany) Laurin Heinrich | P | 3 |
| Porsche | (France) AV Racing by Car Collection Motorsport | Porsche 911 GT3 R (992) | 29 | (France) Noam Abramczyk | PA | 3 |
| Porsche | (France) AV Racing by Car Collection Motorsport | Porsche 911 GT3 R (992) | 29 | (Belgium) Mathieu Detry | PA | 3 |
| Porsche | (France) AV Racing by Car Collection Motorsport | Porsche 911 GT3 R (992) | 29 | (Belgium) Fabian Duffieux | PA | 3 |
| Porsche | (France) AV Racing by Car Collection Motorsport | Porsche 911 GT3 R (992) | 29 | (China) Yuan Bo | PA | 3 |
| Porsche | (United States) GMG Racing | Porsche 911 GT3 R (992) | 32 | (Austria) Klaus Bachler | PA | 5 |
| Porsche | (United States) GMG Racing | Porsche 911 GT3 R (992) | 32 | (Australia) Tom Sargent | PA | 5 |
| Porsche | (United States) GMG Racing | Porsche 911 GT3 R (992) | 32 | (United States) Kyle Washington | PA | 5 |
| Porsche | (Germany) Falken Motorsports | Porsche 911 GT3 R (992) | 33 | (France) Julien Andlauer | P | 2 |
| Porsche | (Germany) Falken Motorsports | Porsche 911 GT3 R (992) | 33 | (Germany) Nico Menzel | P | 2 |
| Porsche | (Germany) Falken Motorsports | Porsche 911 GT3 R (992) | 33 | (Germany) Sven Müller | P | 2 |
| Porsche | (Germany) Falken Motorsports | Porsche 911 GT3 R (992) | 33 | (Belgium) Alessio Picariello | P | 2 |
| Porsche | (Germany) Falken Motorsports | Porsche 911 GT3 R (992) | 44 | (France) Dorian Boccolacci | P | 2 |
| Porsche | (Germany) Falken Motorsports | Porsche 911 GT3 R (992) | 44 | (Germany) Tim Heinemann | P | 2 |
| Porsche | (Germany) Falken Motorsports | Porsche 911 GT3 R (992) | 44 | (Germany) Dennis Marschall | P | 2 |
| Porsche | (Germany) Falken Motorsports | Porsche 911 GT3 R (992) | 44 | (Netherlands) Morris Schuring | P | 2 |
| Porsche | (South Korea) Vollgas Motorsports | Porsche 911 GT3 R (992) | 33 | (South Korea) Jongpil Kim | S | 4 |
| Porsche | (South Korea) Vollgas Motorsports | Porsche 911 GT3 R (992) | 33 | (China) Liang Jiatong | S | 4 |
| Porsche | (South Korea) Vollgas Motorsports | Porsche 911 GT3 R (992) | 33 | (Netherlands) "Daan Arrow" | S | 4 |
| Porsche | (Germany) Black Falcon Team EAE | Porsche 911 GT3 R (992) | 48 | (Netherlands) "Daan Arrow" | PA | 2 |
| Porsche | (Germany) Black Falcon Team EAE | Porsche 911 GT3 R (992) | 48 | (Germany) Ben Büennagel | PA | 2 |
| Porsche | (Germany) Black Falcon Team EAE | Porsche 911 GT3 R (992) | 48 | (Turkey) Mustafa Mehmet Kaya | PA | 2 |
| Porsche | (Germany) Black Falcon Team EAE | Porsche 911 GT3 R (992) | 48 | (Germany) Gabriele Piana | PA | 2 |
| Porsche | (South Korea) Hankook Competition | Porsche 911 GT3 R (992) | 55 | (Netherlands) Roelof Bruins | PA | 2 |
| Porsche | (South Korea) Hankook Competition | Porsche 911 GT3 R (992) | 55 | (Canada) Steven Cho | PA | 2 |
| Porsche | (South Korea) Hankook Competition | Porsche 911 GT3 R (992) | 55 | (Germany) Marco Holzer | PA | 2 |
| Porsche | (South Korea) Hankook Competition | Porsche 911 GT3 R (992) | 55 | (South Korea) Kim Jong-kyum | PA | 2 |
| Porsche | (New Zealand) EBM GIGA Racing | Porsche 911 GT3 R (992) | 61 | (Malaysia) Adrian D'Silva | P | 4–5 |
| Porsche | (New Zealand) EBM GIGA Racing | Porsche 911 GT3 R (992) | 61 | (Germany) Sven Müller | P | 4–5 |
| Porsche | (New Zealand) EBM GIGA Racing | Porsche 911 GT3 R (992) | 61 | (United Kingdom) Harry King | P | 4 |
| Porsche | (New Zealand) EBM GIGA Racing | Porsche 911 GT3 R (992) | 61 | (Switzerland) Ricardo Feller | P | 5 |
| Porsche | (Germany) Lionspeed GP | Porsche 911 GT3 R (992) | 80 | (Switzerland) Ricardo Feller | B | 3 |
| Porsche | (Germany) Lionspeed GP | Porsche 911 GT3 R (992) | 80 | (Germany) Patrick Kolb | B | 3 |
| Porsche | (Germany) Lionspeed GP | Porsche 911 GT3 R (992) | 80 | (Italy) Riccardo Pera | B | 3 |
| Porsche | (Germany) Lionspeed GP | Porsche 911 GT3 R (992) | 80 | (Italy) Gabriel Rindone | B | 3 |
| Porsche | (Australia) The Bend Manthey EMA (Note: Car No. 91 entered as The Bend Manthey EMA, and No. 911 entered as Manthey EMA.) (Germany) Manthey EMA | Porsche 911 GT3 R (992) | 91 | (Germany) Laurin Heinrich | PA | 1 |
| Porsche | (Australia) The Bend Manthey EMA (Germany) Manthey EMA | Porsche 911 GT3 R (992) | 91 | (Netherlands) Morris Schuring | PA | 1 |
| Porsche | (Australia) The Bend Manthey EMA (Germany) Manthey EMA | Porsche 911 GT3 R (992) | 91 | (Australia) Sam Shahin | PA | 1 |
| Porsche | (Australia) The Bend Manthey EMA (Germany) Manthey EMA | Porsche 911 GT3 R (992) | 91 | (Australia) Yasser Shahin | PA | 1 |
| Porsche | (Australia) The Bend Manthey EMA (Germany) Manthey EMA | Porsche 911 GT3 R (992) | 911 | (France) Kévin Estre | P | 2 |
| Porsche | (Australia) The Bend Manthey EMA (Germany) Manthey EMA | Porsche 911 GT3 R (992) | 911 | (Turkey) Ayhancan Güven | P | 2 |
| Porsche | (Australia) The Bend Manthey EMA (Germany) Manthey EMA | Porsche 911 GT3 R (992) | 911 | (Austria) Thomas Preining | P | 2 |
| Porsche | (Germany) Rutronik Racing | Porsche 911 GT3 R (992) | 96 | (Germany) Sven Müller | P | 3 |
| Porsche | (Germany) Rutronik Racing | Porsche 911 GT3 R (992) | 96 | (Switzerland) Patric Niederhauser | P | 3 |
| Porsche | (Germany) Rutronik Racing | Porsche 911 GT3 R (992) | 96 | (Belgium) Alessio Picariello | P | 3 |
| Porsche | (Germany) Rutronik Racing | Porsche 911 GT3 R (992) | 97 | (Hong Kong) Antares Au | B | 3 |
| Porsche | (Germany) Rutronik Racing | Porsche 911 GT3 R (992) | 97 | (Netherlands) Loek Hartog | B | 3 |
| Porsche | (Germany) Rutronik Racing | Porsche 911 GT3 R (992) | 97 | (Estonia) Martin Rump | B | 3 |
| Porsche | (Germany) Rutronik Racing | Porsche 911 GT3 R (992) | 97 | (Netherlands) Morris Schuring | B | 3 |
| Porsche | (Lithuania) Pure Rxcing | Porsche 911 GT3 R (992) | 911 | (Austria) Richard Lietz | P | 3 |
| Porsche | (Lithuania) Pure Rxcing | Porsche 911 GT3 R (992) | 911 | (United Kingdom) Alex Malykhin (Note: Malykhin is Belarusian, but he competes under a British licence as Belarusian national emblems were banned by the FIA following the Russian invasion of Ukraine.) | P | 3 |
| Porsche | (Lithuania) Pure Rxcing | Porsche 911 GT3 R (992) | 911 | (Austria) Thomas Preining | P | 3 |

| Icon | Class |
|---|---|
| P | Pro Cup |
| G | Gold Cup |
| S | Silver Cup |
| B | Bronze Cup |
| PA | Pro-Am Cup |
| Am | Am Cup |
| | Independent Cup |

=== Notes ===
- 111 Racing was due to compete in the Bronze class with a Mercedes-AMG GT3 Evo in the 2025 Bathurst 12 Hour with drivers Darren Currie, Grant Donaldson and Cameron McLeod, but withdrew due to a lack of funding.

== Championship standings ==
Scoring system

Championship points were awarded for the first ten positions in each race. Entries were required to complete 75% of the winning car's race distance in order to be classified and earn points. Individual drivers were required to participate for a minimum of 25 minutes in order to earn championship points in any race. A manufacturer only received points for its two highest placed cars in each round.

| Position | **1st** | **2nd** | **3rd** | **4th** | **5th** | **6th** | **7th** | **8th** | **9th** | **10th** |
| Points | 25 | 18 | 15 | 12 | 10 | 8 | 6 | 4 | 2 | 1 |

=== Drivers' championships ===
==== Overall championship ====
The results indicate the classification relative to other drivers in the series, not the classification in the race.

| Pos. | Driver | Manufacturer | BAT (Australia) | NÜR (Germany) | SPA (Belgium) | SUZ (Japan) | IND (United States) | Points |
|---|---|---|---|---|---|---|---|---|
| 1 | (South Africa) Kelvin van der Linde | BMW | 1 | 1 | 5 | 1 | 1 | 110 |
| 2 | (Switzerland) Raffaele Marciello | BMW | 2 | 1 | 4 | 1 | 3 | 95 |
| 3 | (Brazil) Augusto Farfus | BMW | 1 | 1 | 4 | 5 | 3 | 87 |
| 4 | (Belgium) Charles Weerts | BMW | 2 | | 5 | 1 | 1 | 78 |
| 5 | (Belgium) Alessio Picariello | Porsche | 6 | Ret | 1 | 4 | 5 | 55 |
| 6 | (Italy) Valentino Rossi | BMW | 2 | | 8 | | 1 | 47 |
| 7 | (Germany) Luca Stolz | Mercedes-AMG | 3 | Ret | Ret | 6 | 2 | 41 |
| 8 | (Finland) Jesse Krohn | BMW | | 1 | 4 | | | 37 |
| 9 | (France) Kévin Estre | Porsche | | 2 | | 2 | | 36 |
| 10 | (South Africa) Sheldon van der Linde | BMW | 1 | | 6 | | | 33 |
| 10 | (Switzerland) Patric Niederhauser | Porsche | | WD | 1 | 7 | 9 | 33 |
| 11 | (Netherlands) Loek Hartog | Porsche | | 3 | 28 | 3 | 9 | 32 |
| 12 | (Austria) Lucas Auer | Mercedes-AMG | 5 | 7 | 7 | | 7 | 28 |
| 13 | (Denmark) Bastian Buus | Porsche | | 3 | Ret | 4 | | 27 |
| 14 | (Turkey) Ayhancan Güven | Porsche | 6 | 2 | Ret | | | 26 |
| 15 | (Germany) Sven Müller | Porsche | | Ret | 1 | 11 | Ret | 25 |
| 16 | (Germany) Maro Engel | Mercedes-AMG | Ret | Ret | 7 | | 2 | 24 |
| 17 | (Australia) Kenny Habul | Mercedes-AMG | 3 | | | 12 | 6 | 23 |
| 18 | (Italy) Alessio Rovera | Ferrari | 8 | | 2 | | | 22 |
| 19 | (Italy) Matteo Cairoli | Porsche | | 3 | | | | 21 |
| 19 | (Italy) Matteo Cairoli | Mercedes-AMG | | | 7 | | | 21 |
| 20 | (Australia) Chaz Mostert | Ferrari | 4 | | | | | 20 |
| 20 | (Australia) Chaz Mostert | Mercedes-AMG | | | | | 6 | 20 |
| 20 | (Canada) Mikaël Grenier | Mercedes-AMG | Ret | 7 | Ret | 6 | 7 | 20 |
| 21 | (Austria) Thomas Preining | Porsche | | 2 | Ret | | | 18 |
| 21 | (Belgium) Laurens Vanthoor | Porsche | | WD | | 2 | | 18 |
| 21 | (Monaco) Vincent Abril (Italy) Alessandro Pier Guidi | Ferrari | | | 2 | | | 18 |
| 21 | (France) Patrick Pilet | Porsche | | | | 2 | | 18 |
| 21 | (Germany) Tom Kalender | Mercedes-AMG | | | Ret | | 2 | 18 |
| 22 | (Hong Kong) Antares Au | Porsche | | | 28 | 3 | 9 | 17 |
| 23 | (Andorra) Jules Gounon | Mercedes-AMG | 3 | | Ret | | **17** | 15 |
| 23 | (Germany) Joel Sturm | Porsche | | 3 | 32 | | | 15 |
| 23 | (Austria) Richard Lietz | Porsche | | | Ret | 3 | | 15 |
| 23 | (Italy) Eliseo Donno (Italy) Antonio Fuoco (Monaco) Arthur Leclerc | Ferrari | | | 3 | | | 15 |
| 23 | (Oman) Al Faisal Al Zubair | BMW | | | 12 | | 3 | 15 |
| 24 | (Germany) Laurin Heinrich | Porsche | 9 | | Ret | 4 | Ret | 14 |
| 25 | (Australia) Will Brown (Brazil) Daniel Serra | Ferrari | 4 | | | | | 12 |
| 25 | (Netherlands) Roelof Bruins (Canada) Steven Cho (Germany) Marco Holzer (South Korea) Kim Jong-kyum | Porsche | | 4 | | | | 12 |
| 25 | (Germany) Maximilian Götz | Mercedes-AMG | 5 | | Ret | 9 | | 12 |
| 25 | (United States) Connor De Phillippi | BMW | | | 30 | | 4 | 12 |
| 25 | (United States) Conor Daly (United States) Kenton Koch | BMW | | | | | 4 | 12 |
| 26 | (United Kingdom) Dan Harper (Germany) Max Hesse | BMW | | | 20 | 5 | | 10 |
| 26 | (Australia) Jayden Ojeda | Mercedes-AMG | 5 | | | | | 10 |
| 26 | (Germany) Christopher Brück (Germany) Jannes Fittje (Germany) Jay Mo Härtling (Germany) Kenneth Heyer | Mercedes-AMG | | 5 | | | | 10 |
| 26 | (Belgium) Ugo de Wilde | BMW | | | 5 | | | 10 |
| 26 | (United States) Jan Heylen (United Kingdom) Alex Sedgwick | Porsche | | | | | 5 | 10 |
| 27 | (Netherlands) "Daan Arrow" | Porsche | | 6 | | 21 | | 8 |
| 27 | (Netherlands) "Daan Arrow" | Mercedes-AMG | | | 11 | | 14 | 8 |
| 27 | (Italy) Gabriele Piana | Porsche | | 6 | | | | 8 |
| 27 | (Italy) Gabriele Piana | Mercedes-AMG | | | 11 | | | 8 |
| 27 | (Belgium) Maxime Martin | Mercedes-AMG | Ret | Ret | Ret | 6 | **17** | 8 |
| 27 | (Australia) Matt Campbell | Porsche | 6 | | Ret | | | 8 |
| 27 | (Germany) Ben Büennagel (Turkey) Mustafa Mehmet Kaya | Porsche | | 6 | | | | 8 |
| 27 | (Belgium) Dries Vanthoor (Germany) Marco Wittmann | BMW | | | 6 | | | 8 |
| 27 | (Canada) Zacharie Robichon | Mercedes-AMG | 7 | | | 19 | | 8 |
| 27 | (Canada) Zacharie Robichon | Ferrari | | | 9 | | | 8 |
| 27 | (Estonia) Ralf Aron | Mercedes-AMG | | 7 | | 9 | | 8 |
| 27 | (Australia) Will Power | Mercedes-AMG | | | | | 6 | 8 |
| 28 | (United Kingdom) Ian James | Mercedes-AMG | 7 | | 24 | 19 | | 6 |
| 28 | (France) Dorian Boccolacci | Porsche | | Ret | | 7 | | 6 |
| 28 | (Austria) Klaus Bachler | Porsche | | | Ret | 7 | 12 | 6 |
| 28 | (United Kingdom) Ross Gunn | Mercedes-AMG | 7 | | | | | 6 |
| 28 | (United Kingdom) Adam Christodoulou | Mercedes-AMG | | 7 | | | | 6 |
| 28 | (Germany) Dennis Marschall | Porsche | | Ret | | | 8 | 6 |
| 28 | (Germany) Dennis Marschall | Ferrari | | | 9 | 20 | | 6 |
| 28 | (United States) Dustin Blattner | Ferrari | | | 9 | 20 | | 6 |
| 28 | (United States) Dustin Blattner | Porsche | | | | | 8 | 6 |
| 28 | (Canada) Michai Stephens | Mercedes-AMG | | | | | 7 | 6 |
| 29 | (Germany) Alfred Renauer | Porsche | | | 16 | 10 | 8 | 5 |
| 30 | (United States) Neil Verhagen | BMW | | | 12 | 8 | | 4 |
| 30 | (Zimbabwe) Axcil Jefferies | Ferrari | | 8 | | | | 4 |
| 30 | (Zimbabwe) Axcil Jefferies | Porsche | | | 16 | | | 4 |
| 30 | (France) Thomas Neubauer | Ferrari | | 8 | | 26 | | 4 |
| 30 | (Germany) Felipe Fernández Laser (South Africa) David Perel | Ferrari | | 8 | 27 | | | 4 |
| 30 | (Netherlands) Maxime Oosten | BMW | | | Ret | 8 | | 4 |
| 30 | (New Zealand) Jaxon Evans (Australia) Brad Schumacher (Australia) Elliot Schutte | Ferrari | 8 | | | | | 4 |
| 30 | (Denmark) Kevin Magnussen (Germany) René Rast | BMW | | | 8 | | | 4 |
| 30 | (China) Ruan Cunfan | BMW | | | | 8 | | 4 |
| 31 | (Netherlands) Morris Schuring | Porsche | 9 | Ret | 28 | | | 2 |
| 31 | (Australia) Sam Shahin (Australia) Yasser Shahin | Porsche | 9 | | | | | 2 |
| 31 | (Denmark) Conrad Laursen | Ferrari | | | 9 | | | 2 |
| 31 | (Japan) Kakunoshin Ohta | Mercedes-AMG | | | | 9 | | 2 |
| 32 | (Germany) Ralf Bohn (Germany) Robert Renauer | Porsche | | | 16 | 10 | 13 | 1 |
| 32 | (Australia) James Koundouris (Australia) Theo Koundouris (Australia) David Russell (Australia) Luke Youlden | Mercedes-AMG | 10 | | | | | 1 |
| 32 | (Australia) Tom Sargent | Porsche | | | 10 | | 12 | 1 |
| 32 | (United States) Adam Adelson (United States) Elliott Skeer | Porsche | | | 10 | | Ret | 1 |
| 32 | (United States) Robby Foley (United States) Patrick Gallagher (United States) Justin Rothberg | BMW | | | | | 10 | 1 |
| — | (Germany) Marvin Dienst (Armenia) Rinat Salikhov | Mercedes-AMG | | | 11 | | | 0 |
| — | (Malaysia) Adrian D'Silva | Porsche | | | | 11 | Ret | 0 |
| — | (United Kingdom) Harry King | Porsche | | | | 11 | | 0 |
| — | (United States) Colin Braun (United States) George Kurtz | Mercedes-AMG | | | 24 | | 11 | 0 |
| — | (United Kingdom) Toby Sowery | BMW | | | Ret | | | 0 |
| — | (United Kingdom) Toby Sowery | Mercedes-AMG | | | | | 11 | 0 |
| — | (Switzerland) Yannick Mettler | Mercedes-AMG | | | Ret | 12 | | 0 |
| — | (Germany) Jens Klingmann (United Kingdom) Ben Tuck | BMW | | | 12 | | | 0 |
| — | (Austria) Dominik Baumann | Mercedes-AMG | | | | 12 | | 0 |
| — | (United States) Kyle Washington | Porsche | | | | | 12 | 0 |
| — | (Japan) Kazuto Kotaka | Mercedes-AMG | | | 25 | | | 0 |
| — | (Japan) Kazuto Kotaka | Porsche | | | | 13 | | 0 |
| — | (Switzerland) Ricardo Feller | Porsche | | WD | 13 | | Ret | 0 |
| — | (Germany) Patrick Kolb (Italy) Riccardo Pera (Italy) Gabriel Rindone | Porsche | | | 13 | | | 0 |
| — | (Japan) Hiroaki Nagai (Japan) Takuro Shinohara | Porsche | | | | 13 | | 0 |
| — | (Switzerland) Rolf Ineichen | Porsche | | | 32 | | 13 | 0 |
| — | (Netherlands) Mex Jansen (United Kingdom) Will Moore (South Africa) Jarrod Waberski | BMW | | | 14 | | | 0 |
| — | (Switzerland) Philip Ellis | Mercedes-AMG | | | Ret | 17 | 14 | 0 |
| — | (United States) Jeff Burton | Mercedes-AMG | | | | | 14 | 0 |
| — | (Japan) Tatsuya Kataoka (Japan) Kamui Kobayashi (Japan) Nobuteru Taniguchi | Mercedes-AMG | | | 29 | 15 | | 0 |
| — | (Sweden) Gustav Bergström (France) Étienne Cheli (Belgium) Gilles Stadsbader (France) Pierre-Louis Chovet | BMW | | | 15 | | | 0 |
| — | (United States) Conrad Grunewald (Brazil) Oswaldo Negri Jr. (United States) Jay Schreibman | Ferrari | | | | | 15 | 0 |
| — | (Hong Kong) Jonathan Hui | Ferrari | | | 31 | | | 0 |
| — | (Hong Kong) Jonathan Hui | Mercedes-AMG | | | | 16 | | 0 |
| — | (United Kingdom) Ben Barnicoat (Hong Kong) Kevin Tse | Mercedes-AMG | | | | 16 | | 0 |
| — | (Brazil) Christian Hahn (Brazil) Marcelo Hahn (Brazil) Allam Khodair | Ferrari | | | | | 16 | 0 |
| — | (United Kingdom) Charles Dawson (United Kingdom) Kiern Jewiss (Canada) Parker Thompson (United Kingdom) Lewis Williamson | Mercedes-AMG | | | 17 | | | 0 |
| — | (Luxembourg) Steve Jans (United States) Anthony McIntosh | Mercedes-AMG | | | | 17 | | 0 |
| — | (Netherlands) Lin Hodenius | Mercedes-AMG | | | Ret | | **17** | 0 |
| — | (France) Loris Cabirou (France) César Gazeau (France) Aurélien Panis (United Kingdom) Hugo Cook | Mercedes-AMG | | | 18 | | | 0 |
| — | (Denmark) Anders Fjordbach (China) Kerong Li (China) Leo Ye Hongli | Porsche | | | | 18 | | 0 |
| — | (Italy) Daniele Di Amato (Italy) David Fumanelli (Switzerland) Nicolò Rosi (Italy) Niccolò Schirò | Ferrari | | | 19 | | | 0 |
| — | (Spain) Alex Riberas | Mercedes-AMG | | | | 19 | | 0 |
| — | (Italy) Lorenzo Patrese | Ferrari | | | 31 | 20 | | 0 |
| — | (Austria) Philipp Eng | BMW | | | 20 | | Ret | 0 |
| — | (United Arab Emirates) Federico Al Rifai (France) Sébastien Baud (Sri Lanka) Eshan Pieris (Netherlands) Jop Rappange | Porsche | | | 21 | | | 0 |
| — | (South Korea) Jongpil Kim (China) Liang Jiatong | Porsche | | | | 21 | | 0 |
| — | (Germany) Nico Menzel | Porsche | | Ret | | 22 | | 0 |
| — | (France) Noam Abramczyk (Belgium) Mathieu Detry (Belgium) Fabian Duffieux (China) Bo Yuan | Porsche | | | 22 | | | 0 |
| — | (Hong Kong) Adderly Fong (China) Sun Jingzu | Porsche | | | | 22 | | 0 |
| — | (Belgium) Jef Machiels (Belgium) Louis Machiels (Italy) Tommaso Mosca (Argentina) Marcos Siebert | Ferrari | | | 23 | | | 0 |
| — | (Italy) Giancarlo Fisichella (Japan) Kei Nakanishi (Japan) Shigekazu Wakisaka | Ferrari | | | | 23 | | 0 |
| — | (Netherlands) Nicky Catsburg | Mercedes-AMG | | | 24 | | | 0 |
| — | (Australia) Grant Denyer (Australia) Andrew Macpherson (Australia) William Ben Porter | Porsche | | | | 24 | | 0 |
| — | (Italy) Edoardo Liberati (Japan) Yuichi Nakayama (Germany) Tim Sandtler | Mercedes-AMG | | | 25 | | | 0 |
| — | (Japan) Shinichi Takagi (United Kingdom) Sean Walkinshaw (Japan) Daisuke Yamawaki | Ferrari | | | | 25 | | 0 |
| — | (Belgium) Stéphane Lémeret (Spain) Miguel Molina (Argentina) Luis Pérez Companc (Argentina) Matías Pérez Companc | Ferrari | | | 26 | | | 0 |
| — | (Japan) Yusaku Maezawa (Japan) Naoki Yokomizo | Ferrari | | | | 26 | | 0 |
| — | (Germany) Christian Hook (Italy) Davide Rigon | Ferrari | | | 27 | | | 0 |
| — | (Estonia) Martin Rump | Porsche | | | 28 | | | 0 |
| — | (Italy) Felice Jelmini (Italy) Federico Malvestiti (Brazil) Marcelo Tomasoni | BMW | | | 30 | | | 0 |
| — | (Italy) Eddie Cheever III (United Kingdom) Chris Froggatt | Ferrari | | | 31 | | | 0 |
| — | (Germany) Tim Heinemann | Porsche | | Ret | 32 | | | 0 |
| — | (Germany) Fabian Schiller | Mercedes-AMG | Ret | Ret | Ret | | | 0 |
| — | (Australia) Stephen Grove (Australia) Brenton Grove | Mercedes-AMG | Ret | | | | | 0 |
| — | (Australia) Craig Lowndes (Australia) Thomas Randle (Australia) Cameron Waters | Mercedes-AMG | Ret | | | | | 0 |
| — | (France) Julien Andlauer | Porsche | | Ret | | | | 0 |
| — | (United Kingdom) Jake Dennis (Indonesia) Sean Gelael (United Kingdom) Darren Leung | BMW | | | Ret | | | 0 |
| — | (United Kingdom) Charles Clark (Brazil) Pedro Ebrahim (United Kingdom) James Kellett | BMW | | | Ret | | | 0 |
| — | (Italy) Riccardo Agostini (United Kingdom) Matt Bell (United States) Blake McDonald (Brazil) Custodio Toledo | Ferrari | | | Ret | | | 0 |
| — | (United States) Anthony Bartone (Poland) Karol Basz | Mercedes-AMG | | | Ret | | | 0 |
| — | (Netherlands) Colin Caresani (Thailand) Tanart Sathienthirakul (United Kingdom) Aaron Walker | Mercedes-AMG | | | Ret | | | 0 |
| — | (Netherlands) Indy Dontje (Canada) Daniel Morad (United States) Russell Ward | Mercedes-AMG | | | Ret | | | 0 |
| — | (France) Mathieu Jaminet | Porsche | | | Ret | | | 0 |
| — | (United Kingdom) Alex Malykhin | Porsche | | | Ret | | | 0 |
| — | (Japan) Kei Cozzolino (Japan) Yorikatsu Tsujiko (Japan) Yusuke Yamasaki | Ferrari | | | | Ret | | 0 |
| — | (United States) Bill Auberlen (United States) Varun Choksey | BMW | | | | | Ret | 0 |
| Pos. | Driver | Manufacturer | BAT (Australia) | NÜR (Germany) | SPA (Belgium) | SUZ (Japan) | IND (United States) | Points |

| Colour | Result |
|---|---|
| Gold | Winner |
| Silver | Second place |
| Bronze | Third place |
| Green | Points classification |
| Blue | Non-points classification |
| Blue | Non-classified finish (NC) |
| Purple | Retired, not classified (Ret) |
| Red | Did not qualify (DNQ) |
| Red | Did not pre-qualify (DNPQ) |
| Black | Disqualified (DSQ) |
| White | Did not start (DNS) |
| White | Withdrew (WD) |
| White | Race cancelled (C) |
| Blank | Did not practice (DNP) |
| Blank | Did not arrive (DNA) |
| Blank | Excluded (EX) |

**Bold** – Pole
Italics – Fastest Lap

==== Intercontinental GT Challenge Independent Cup ====
| Pos. | Driver | Manufacturer | BAT (Australia) | NÜR (Germany) | SPA (Belgium) | SUZ (Japan) | IND (United States) | Points |
|---|---|---|---|---|---|---|---|---|
| 1 | (Australia) Kenny Habul | Mercedes-AMG | **1** | | | 4 | 1 | 62 |
| 2 | (Hong Kong) Antares Au | Porsche | | | 2 | 1 | 2 | 61 |
| 3 | (Germany) Ralf Bohn | Porsche | | | 1 | 2 | 3 | 58 |
| 4 | (Malaysia) Adrian D'Silva | Porsche | | | | 3 | 4 | 27 |
| 5 | (Hong Kong) Jonathan Hui | Ferrari | | | **3** | | | 25 |
| 5 | (Hong Kong) Jonathan Hui | Mercedes-AMG | | | | 5 | | 25 |
| Pos. | Driver | Manufacturer | BAT (Australia) | NÜR (Germany) | SPA (Belgium) | SUZ (Japan) | IND (United States) | Points |

=== Manufacturers' championship ===
| Pos. | Manufacturer | BAT (Australia) | NÜR (Germany) | SPA (Belgium) | SUZ (Japan) | IND (United States) | Points |
|---|---|---|---|---|---|---|---|
| 1 | (Germany) BMW | 1 | 1 | 4 | 1 | 1 | 207 |
| 1 | (Germany) BMW | 2 | | 5 | 5 | 3 | 207 |
| 2 | (Germany) Porsche | 6 | 2 | 1 | 2 | 5 | 149 |
| 2 | (Germany) Porsche | 9 | 3 | 10 | 3 | 8 | 149 |
| 3 | (Germany) Mercedes-AMG | 3 | 5 | 7 | 6 | 2 | 131 |
| 3 | (Germany) Mercedes-AMG | 5 | 8 | 11 | 9 | 6 | 131 |
| 4 | (Italy) Ferrari | 4 | 7 | 2 | 19 | 15 | 91 |
| 4 | (Italy) Ferrari | 8 | | 3 | 23 | 16 | 91 |

== See also ==
- 2025 British GT Championship
- 2025 GT World Challenge America
- 2025 GT World Challenge Asia
- 2025 GT World Challenge Australia
- 2025 GT World Challenge Europe Endurance Cup
