= List of auto racing governing bodies in the United States =

This is a list of the auto racing governing bodies for the United States and the series they govern.

== Current ==
=== Automobile Racing Club of America ===
- ARCA Menards Racing Series
- ARCA Re-Max Series
- ARCA Truck Series
- ARCA CRA Super Series
- ARCA Midwest Tour
- ARCA OK Tire Sportsman Series

=== INDYCAR ===
- IndyCar Series
- Indy NXT
- Pro Mazda Championship
- U.S. F2000 National Championship

=== ICSCC ===
- Spec Miata
- Improved Touring

=== International Hot Rod Association ===
- Knoll-Gas Nitro Jam Drag Racing Series
- O'Reilly Auto Parts Thunder Jam
- The Summit Pro-Am Tour
- The Summit SuperSeries

=== International Motor Sports Association ===
- WeatherTech SportsCar Championship
- Michelin Pilot Challenge
- Mazda Prototype Lites
- IMSA GT3 Cup Challenge
- IMSA GT3 Cup Challenge Canada
- Ferrari Challenge
- Lamborghini Super Trofeo
- Mazda MX-5 Cup
- Mustang Challenge
- Porsche Carrera Cup North America

=== National Association for Stock Car Auto Racing ===
- Craftsman Truck Series
- Xfinity Series
- NASCAR Cup Series
- Whelen Modified Tour
- Pinty's Series
- NASCAR Mexico Series
- NASCAR Whelen Euro Series
- NASCAR Advance Auto Parts Weekly Series

=== National Auto Sport Association ===
- 944 Challenge
- American Iron
- American Stock Car Challenge
- BMWCCA
- Camaro Mustang Challenge
- Factory Five Challenge
- Formula TR
- GTS Challenge
- Honda Challenge
- Legends Racing
- MX-5 Challenge
- NASA Rally Sport
- Performance Touring
- Porsche Racing Challenge
- Pro Truck
- Spec E30
- Spec Focus
- Spec Miata Challenge
- Super Touring
- Super Unlimited
- United States Touring Car Championship

=== National Hot Rod Association ===
- Jr. Drag Racing League
- Lucas Oil Drag Racing Series
- NHRA Camping World Drag Racing Series
- Summit Racing Series

=== American Rally Association ===
The American Rally Association National Championship Series is the premier stage rally championship in the United States. From coast to coast, the top competitors from N. America and Europe compete at high speeds in street legal cars, on all types of drive-able surfaces. Teams from Subaru Rally Team, Team O'Neil Motorsports, Honda Performance Development, and Dirt Fish compete alongside the fastest privateers like Phoenix Project (phxpjt.com) and McKenna Motorsports. Rally is the oldest form of motorsport that takes place on public or private roads with modified production or specially built road-legal cars. It is distinguished by running not on a circuit, but instead in a point-to-point format in which participants and their co-drivers drive between set control points (special stages), leaving at regular intervals from one or more start points.

=== Formula D ===
- Formula Drift Professional Drifting Championship
- Formula Drift Team Drift
- Red Bull Drifting World Championship

=== Sports Car Club of America ===
- Pirelli World Challenge
- Trans-Am Series
- Global Mazda MX-5 Cup
- United States Formula 4 Championship
- Atlantic Championship
- F2000 Championship Series
- F1600 Championship Series
- Formula 1000
- Formula 500
- Improved Touring

=== United States Auto Club ===
- Silver Crown Series
- Sprint Car Series
- National Midget Series
- HPD Midget Series
- TORC: The Off Road Championship

=== Southern California Timing Association ===
- Bonneville Salt Flats
- El Mirage Dry Lake

=== United States Hot Rod Association ===
- Monster Jam

World of Outlaws

- Sprint Car Series
- Late Model Series

== Former ==
=== Championship Auto Racing Teams (1979-2008) ===
- Champ Car World Series
- Indy Lights
- Atlantic Championship
- Barber Pro Series
- North American Touring Car Championship

=== Grand American Road Racing Association (2000-2013) ===
- Ferrari Challenge
- Ford Racing Mustang Challenge
- Koni Challenge Series
- Rolex Sports Car Series
