= 12 Hours at the Point =

American endurance race

- Venue: Summit Point Motorsports Park
- First race: 1999
- Last race: 2009
- Duration: 12 hours
- Most wins (driver): Harrison/Coleman/Wisker (3)
- Most wins (manufacturer): Porsche (3)
- Lap record: (Harrison/Coleman/Wisker, Porsche 993, 2002 (944 mi (1,519 km))

The 12 Hours at the Point was an endurance race for sports cars and sedans hosted by the Washington, D.C. Region of the Sports Car Club of America (SCCA). The initial event was staged in June 1999 at Summit Point Motorsports Park in Summit Point, West Virginia. With the exception of 2006, the race has been held on the weekend closest to June 1. It is the oldest perennial SCCA-sanctioned endurance race.

It was one of three events that comprised the Triple Crown of SCCA amateur endurance racing. The second event in the Triple Crown was The Longest Day of Nelson, held at Nelson Ledges Road Course in Ohio. The final member of the crown was disputed and was either the Charge of the Headlight Brigade, held at Virginia International Raceway in Virginia or the Tropical 12 Hour, held at Homestead-Miami Speedway in Florida.

2009 was the last year the 12 Hours at the Point was conducted.

== Overall Winners ==
Year	Drivers	Car	Class	Laps	Distance
1999	Legg/Gaynor/Jeter/Craw	Datsun 240Z	ITS	450	900 mi (1,400 km)
2000	Moorcones/Rooney/Ball	Mazda Miata	ITE	439	878 mi (1,413 km)
2001	Ash/Boros/Scweitz/Dobyns	Ferrari 348	ITE	467	934 mi (1,503 km)
2002	Harrison/Coleman/Wisker	Porsche 993	ITE	469	940 mi (1,510 km)
2003	Harrison/Coleman/Wisker	Porsche 993	ITE	394	788 mi (1,268 km)
2004	Coch/Ellinger/Ellinger	Mercedes	ITE	393	786 mi (1,265 km)
2005	Harrison/Coleman/Wisker	Porsche 993	ITE	472	944 mi (1,519 km)
2006	Armstrong/Wilson	Mazda RX-7	ITS	450	900 mi (1,400 km)
2007	Collins/Peter		ITE	467	934 mi (1,503 km)
2008	Ken Reilly/?	Spec Racer Ford	SRF	360	720 mi (1,160 km)

== Index of Performance Winners ==
Year	Drivers	Car	Class	Actual Laps	Actual Distance
1999	LaVine Brothers Racing	VW Scirocco	ITC	423	846 mi (1,362 km)
2000	Baracka/Higgins/Coombs	VW Rabbit	ITC	424	848 mi (1,365 km)
2001	Traut/Traut, Jr.	Mazda Miata	SM	437	874 mi (1,407 km)
2002	O'Brien/Espenlave/Baldwin/Foss/?	Mazda Miata	SM	445	890 mi (1,430 km)
2003	Legg/Lucas	Datsun 240Z	ITS	385	770 mi (1,240 km)
2004	Walsh/Williamson	Nissan 200SX SE-R	SSC	377	754 mi (1,213 km)
2005	de Pedro/Zalner/Zalner	Mazda Miata	SM	446	892 mi (1,436 km)
2006	de Pedro/Zalner/Zalner	Mazda Miata	SM	444	888 mi (1,429 km)
