= Longest Day of Nelson =

Amateur sports car endurance race

The Longest Day of Nelson was conceived in 1980, when a group of racing enthusiasts, led by John McGill, Grover Griggs and Ann McHugh, came up with the idea to hold an amateur 24-hour endurance race for purely showroom stock vehicles at the Nelson Ledges Road Course in Ohio, which would take place on or near the summer solstice each year. Sanctioned by the Sports Car Club of America (SCCA), the host of the event was the Northeast Ohio Region of the SCCA.

In 1981, Popular Mechanics called the race "the second most important 24-hour race in the country." That year, Popular Mechanics raced a Porsche 924 to first place, covering 1,838 miles.

Originally operating as a stand-alone event, it became a stop for the SCCA Playboy Endurance Cup and the subsequent Escort Endurance Series during the mid-eighties, attracting large fields of factory-backed professional race teams. In 1987, the Longest Day returned to its low-key amateur roots and ran yearly until 1996.

It was one of three events that comprised the Triple Crown of SCCA amateur endurance racing. The second event in the Triple Crown, The 12 Hours at the Point, was held at Summit Point Raceway in West Virginia. The final member of the crown is often disputed; the Charge of the Headlight Brigade, held at Virginia International Raceway in Virginia or the Tropical 12 Hour, held at Homestead-Miami Speedway in Florida both lay claim to the event. In 2004, 2005, and 2006, 12-hour races were held.

Nelson Ledges currently hosts a 24-hour race for the ChampCar Endurance Series, for production-based race cars.

Plans were announced to revive the Longest Day of Nelson in 2021 as an SCCA sanctioned event, but the race was postponed to 2022.

The Longest Day of Nelson was held July 16 and 17, 2022, and sanctioned by ChampCar Endurance Series.

== Related events ==
In 1968, the 24 Hours of Nelson Ledges began as the only 24-hour motorcycle race in the United States, finally ceasing in 1993.
