= Cadillac ATS =

Compact executive car by Cadillac (2013–2019)

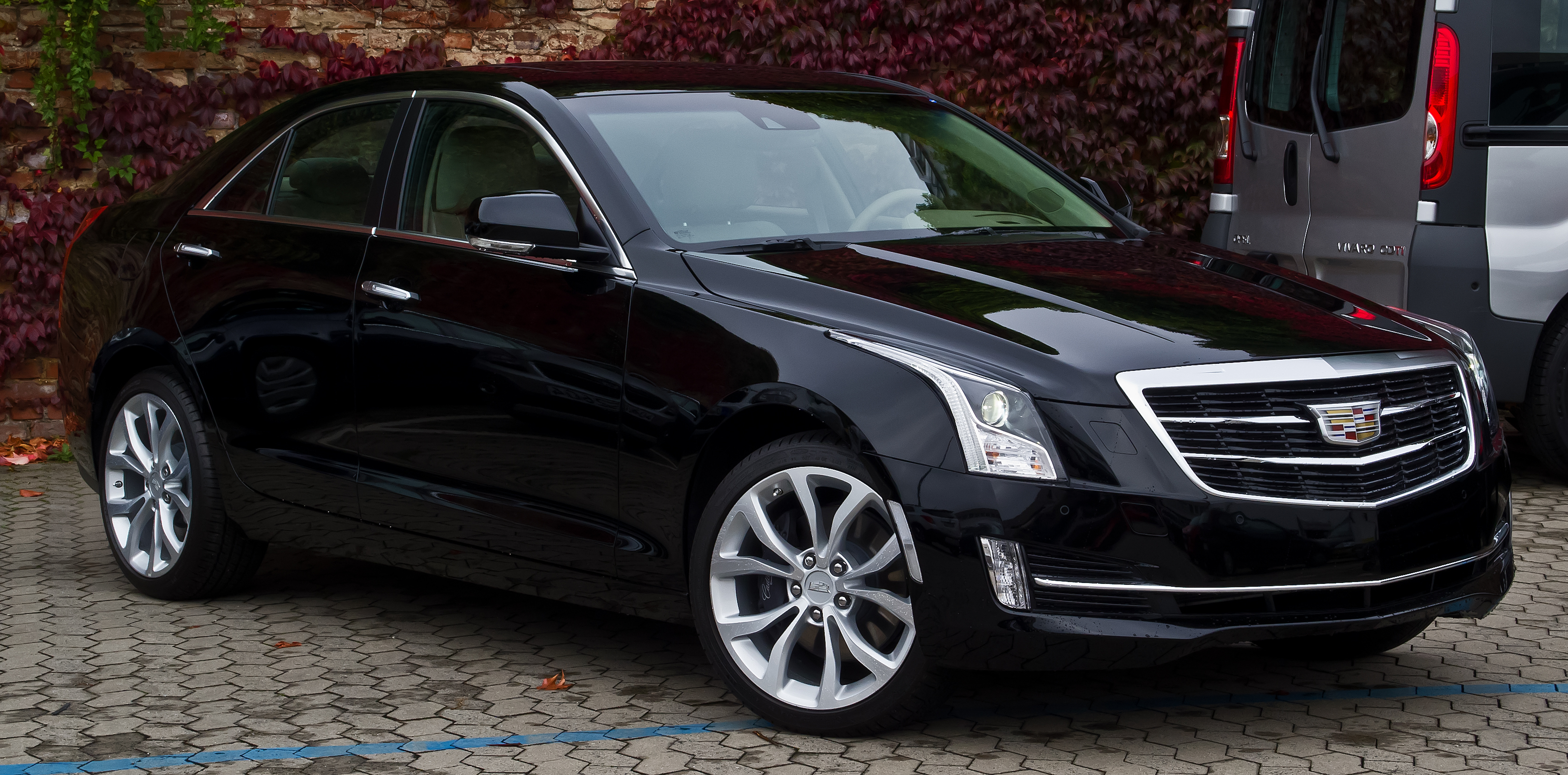

Overview
- Manufacturer: General Motors
- Production: July 2012 – July 2019 (United States); August 2014 – September 2019 (ATS-L) (Note: For the Chinese market only)
- Model years: 2013–2019
- Assembly: United States: Lansing, Michigan (Lansing Grand River Assembly); China: Shanghai (SAIC-GM)
- Designer: Bob Boniface (exterior); Eric Clough (interior)

Body and chassis
- Class: Compact executive car
- Body style: 4-door sedan 2-door coupe
- Layout: Front-engine, rear-wheel-drive; Front-engine, all-wheel-drive
- Platform: GM Alpha
- Related: Cadillac CTS (third generation); Chevrolet Camaro (sixth generation)

Powertrain
- Engine: Gasoline: 2.5 L LCV Ecotec I4; 2.0 L LTG Ecotec I4 turbo; 3.6 L LFX V6 E85; 3.6 L LGX V6
- Transmission: 6-speed Tremec TR-3160 manual; 6-speed Tremec TR-6060 manual; 6-speed GM 6L45 Hydra-Matic automatic; 6-speed GM 6T70 automatic (China); 8-speed GM 8L45 Hydra-Matic automatic

Suspension
- Front: MacPherson struts with dual lower ball joints, twin-tube struts and direct-acting stabilizer bar
- Rear: Five-link independent with twin-tube shock absorbers

Dimensions
- Wheelbase: 2,776 mm (109.3 in); 2,861 mm (112.6 in) (ATS-L)
- Length: 4,643 mm (182.8 in) (sedan); 4,663 mm (183.6 in) (coupe); 4,729 mm (186.2 in) (ATS-L)
- Width: 1,806 mm (71.1 in) (sedan); 1,842 mm (72.5 in) (coupe)
- Height: 1,420 mm (55.9 in) (sedan); 1,392 mm (54.8 in) (coupe)
- Curb weight: 1,504–1,570 kg (3,315–3,461 lb)

Chronology
- Predecessor: Cadillac BLS (Europe)
- Successor: Cadillac CT4

The Cadillac ATS is a compact executive car (D-segment) manufactured by General Motors and marketed by Cadillac from the 2013 to 2019 model years, available in both four-door sedan and two-door coupé body styles. In the US, it is the brand's first locally built entry-level premium car since the Cimarron, and in Europe, it is the successor to the Swedish-built Cadillac BLS. The ATS was developed at the General Motors Technical Center in Warren, Michigan and assembled at the Lansing Grand River Assembly plant in Lansing, Michigan.

Using GM's Alpha platform, the ATS was offered in either rear- or all-wheel drive configurations. The ATS base engine had been a naturally aspirated 2.5-liter I-4 gasoline engine that produces 202 hp (151 kW) (until the 2016 model year). Optional engines include a 2.0-liter turbocharged I-4 gasoline engine that produces 272 hp (203 kW) and a naturally aspirated 3.6-liter V6 gasoline engine that produces 321 hp (239 kW). The 2.0-liter engine replaced the 2.5-liter engine as the base engine for the 2017 model year. All versions were equipped with a 6-speed GM 6L45 Hydra-Matic automatic transmission as standard until the 2015 model year. An 8-speed automatic transmission was introduced for the 2016 model year. The 2.0-liter turbocharged, rear-wheel drive version can be mated to an optional 6-speed Tremec M3L TR-3160 manual transmission.

Prior to the debut of the ATS, Cadillac's smallest vehicle was the E-segment CTS. The CTS was comparable in price to D-segment competitors like the Audi A4, the BMW 3 Series, the Lexus IS and the Mercedes-Benz C-Class, but was comparable in size and weight to the more expensive BMW 5 Series. Although Cadillac believed that customers would favor a Mercedes-Benz E-Class-sized sedan at the price of a 3 Series, this assumption was proven to be incorrect. Cadillac's research found that target customers who already owned vehicles like the 3 Series or A4 did not want a larger vehicle.

Cadillac debuted the ATS to the press in January 2012, before beginning production in July of that year, with sales beginning in August as a 2013 model. Cadillac sold the ATS in the United States, Canada, Mexico, Europe, the Middle East, China, Japan, and South Korea. The ATS was replaced by the Cadillac CT4 in 2019 for the 2020 model year.

== Development ==
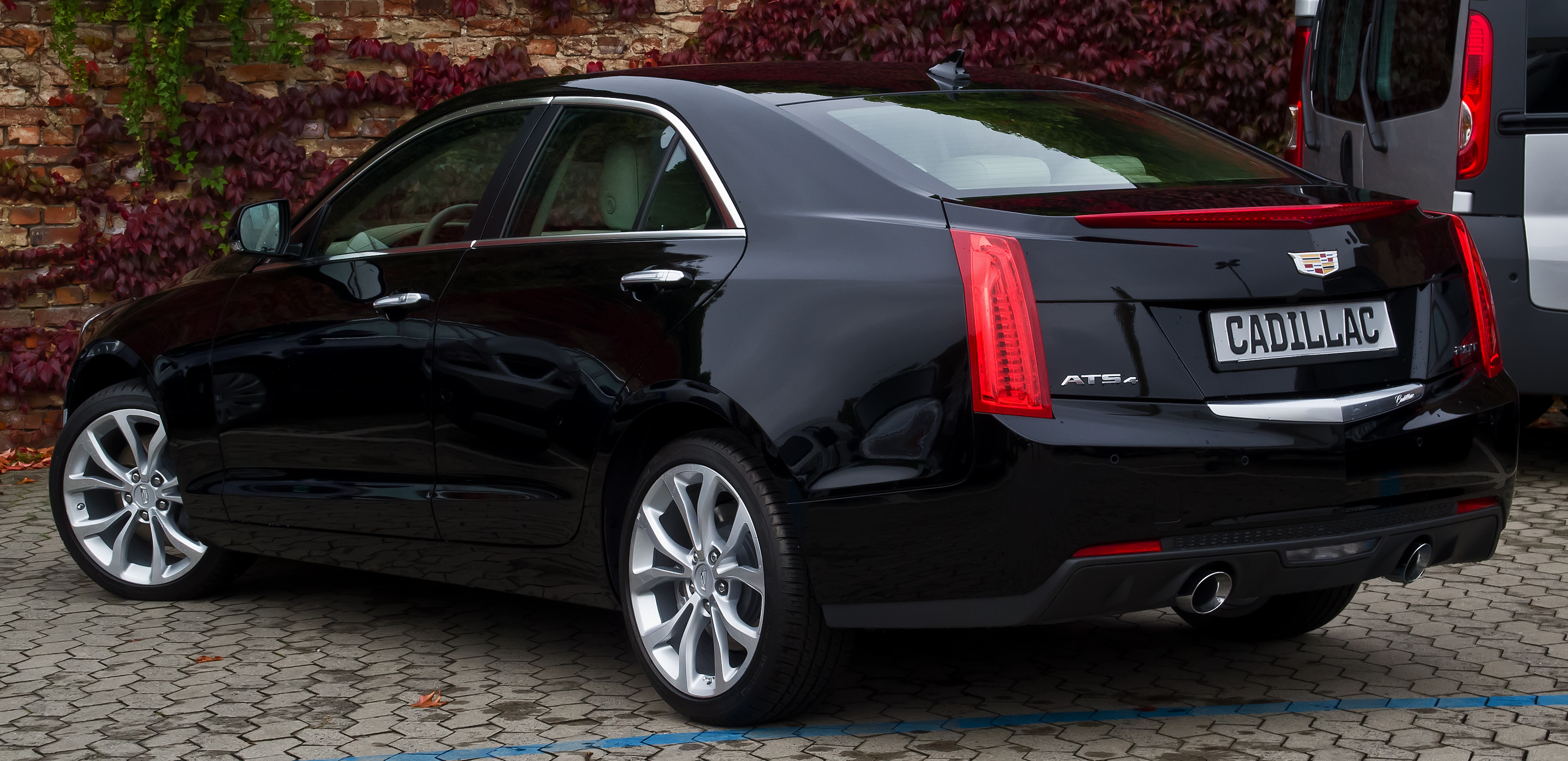
European-spec Cadillac ATS 2.0 Turbo AWD Premium (facelift)

Cadillac, upon discovering that the public wanted something small and designed with consideration, began full-scale development of a compact car in 2009, with said car being given the designation "ATS". The ATS was developed by GM engineers working principally at the General Motors Technical Center in Warren, Michigan, United States. In August 2009, vice president of design Edward Welburn revealed a full-size styling buck of the ATS alongside the XTS luxury saloon.

To establish parameters around which they would design the ATS, GM engineers benchmarked the 1999-2006 BMW E46 3 Series, which ATS chief engineer Dave Masch and his team regarded as the most dynamic and driver-focused iteration of the BMW 3 Series. The engineers emphasized low weight when developing the ATS, and their efforts resulted in a finished vehicle that weighed less than the E46 benchmark. To achieve this result, Masch suggested that the engineering team disregard certain GM product development rules that, had they been followed, would have resulted in a heavier vehicle.

During the early development of the ATS, GM engineers determined that downsizing the GM Sigma II platform that underpinned the second-generation CTS would make the car too heavy, and that using an economical, front-wheel drive platform would sacrifice performance expected of a Cadillac sedan. Under the leadership of Dave Leone, GM engineers created a new platform designed to be light and compact, to be capable of handling both rear- and all-wheel drive configurations, and to have a near 50/50 weight distribution. The new platform developed by the GM engineers for the ATS was called the GM Alpha platform.

Cadillac took two years to conclude the development of the ATS. Ken Kelzer, engineering executive for GM, said that it would have been possible to simply cut down a CTS, which would have resulted a "pretty good car". However, he said that since the BMW 3 Series was its direct competitor, a unique platform would be optimal. Larry Craig, the ATS Program Engineering Manager, said that several iterations were completed until a compromise was made between manufacturability, weight and strength. Consequently, the lightest ATS weighed 3,315 lb (1,504 kg), compared to a BMW E46 328i at 3,461 lb (1,570 kg). Dave Leone, vehicle line executive for rear-wheel-drive and performance cars, knew that downsizing the larger CTS would result in a small car not able to deliver the performance wanted in the segment. Leone and his team established a dollar-per-kilogram strategy to measure the cost effectiveness of weight-reduction. The engineers made sure to monitor materials used in developing the ATS, which resulted in an almost perfect weight distribution figure of 51 percent and 49 percent for front and rear, respectively.

The exterior was designed by a team under the direction of Bob Boniface. Boniface said that the well-designed exterior was due to its well-constructed interior and chassis, and so the design team desired to make its exterior as quality as its system. The design team worked closely with the engineering team to make sure its exterior design met all of the performance metrics they set out. Taki Karras, ATS design manager, stated that it was significantly harder to make an entirely new architecture rather than reskinning something else. According to Kelzer, it took two years to develop kinematics models and building six mules to test theories, and additionally an extra three and a half years to go from formal program approval to production. Tony Roma was the chief engineer of the ATS-V, which had 25 percent greater structural stiffness than a non-V ATS.

In September 2011, Cadillac released a two-minute video which featured an interview with General Motors North America president Mark Reuss, who test drove a pre-production development variant of the ATS; also featured in the video were ATS engineers and developers David Leone, Chris Berube, and Kevin Zelenka. General Motors invested US$190 million to upgrade the Lansing Grand River Assembly plant for ATS production, which created 600 jobs in the result of a second shift of workers. Cadillac debuted the production ATS to the press on January 8, 2012. GM began assembling ATS vehicles intended for sale to customers on July 26, 2012, and began selling the ATS in the United States in August of that year as a 2013 model. Sales in China began on November 21, 2013, initially imported from the US by Shanghai GM. The Chinese-assembled ATS-L was launched in China in August 2014.

=== Design ===
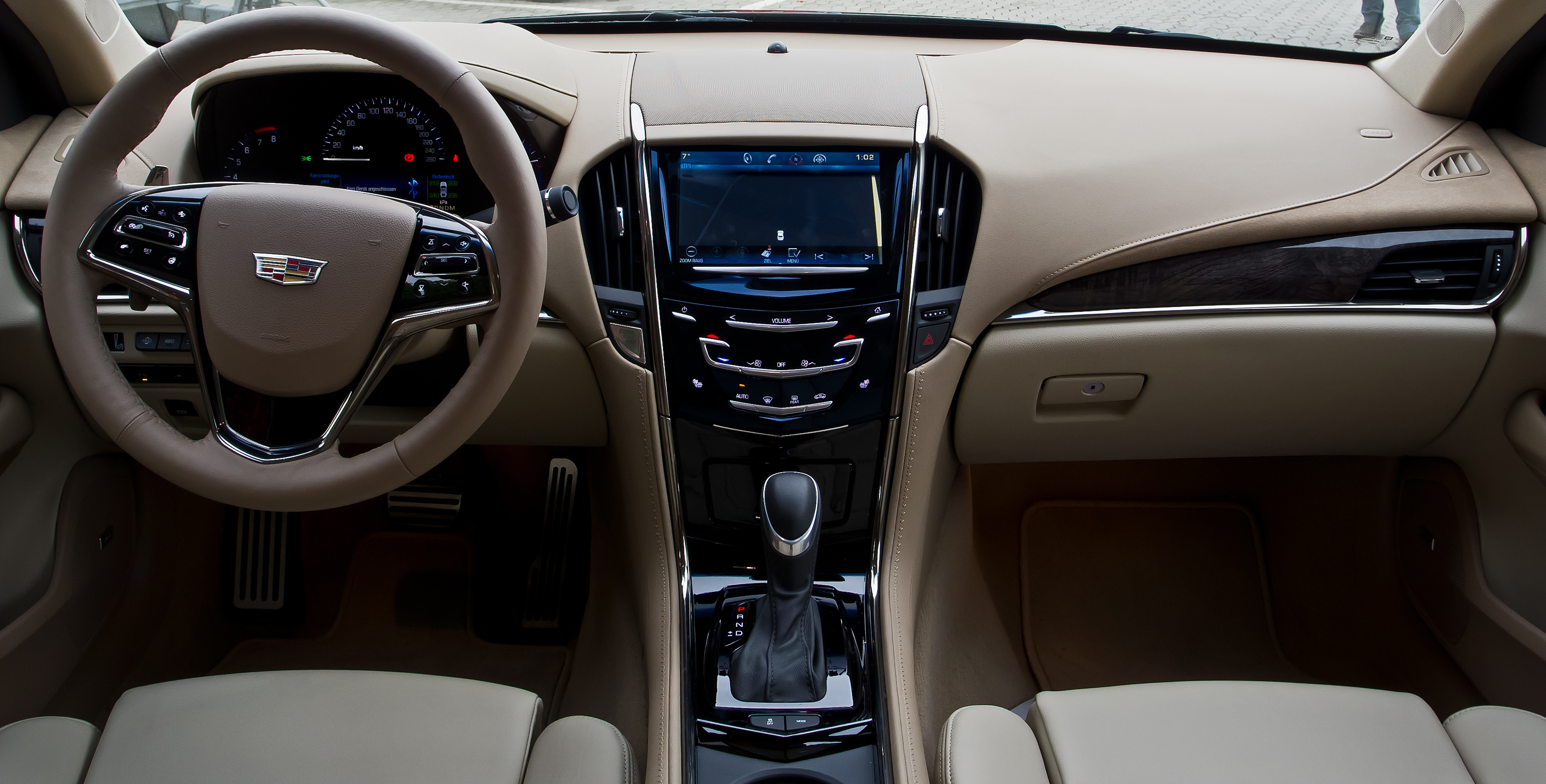
Interior (Premium)

The ATS benefits from electric power steering via a rack-mounted, variable-assist and belt-driven system from ZF Friedrichshafen, internally known as the "ZF Lenksysteme". (Note: "Lenksysteme" is German for "steering systems".) Kelzer said that when GM was looking for suspension layouts, they were also looking at the various electric power steering systems available. Cheaper systems were available, but it would have forced them to give up the premium feeling that the driver expects. The ATS uses cast-iron for the rear differential, unusual for its class, as its competitors use aluminum housings. However, the heavier metal helps preserve the vehicle's 50:50 weight distribution, allows for improved fuel efficiency, among other benefits. As cast iron has a lower thermal expansion rate than aluminum, the differential bearings have a lower pre-load. Noise is suppressed better, and the driveshafts are attached by bolts instead of splines, eliminating spline take-up and defeating noise, vibration, and harshness (NVH).

The ATS features Cadillac's first five-link independent rear suspension. On all four sides, the upper and lower control arms make up four of the links, with the fifth being a toe-control link to increase control over the wheel on a horizontal plane, primarily during cornering. The front suspension is a MacPherson strut, double-pivot set up, using a pair of ball joints and lower control links. Third-generation Magnetic Ride Control active suspension is optional on the Premium trim level in rear-wheel drive. A mechanical limited-slip differential is standard with the manual transmission variant and is available on the premium automatic. Straight steel arms are used in place of aluminum, each with lightening holes stamped in. Underbody aero shields help redirect wind around and under the car, additionally contributes to decreasing noise in the cabin. The ATS achieves a drag coefficient of 0.299 C_{d}. The ATS benefits from advanced materials in multiple locations, which includes ultra high strength steels (UHSS) placed throughout the car, aluminum hood and magnesium engine mounts, a laminated windshield, which is lighter than traditional tempered glass, and door trim panels that are made from natural fibers, which is lighter than the standard plastics.

The ATS offers 10.4 cubic feet (290 L) of boot space, which has been considered relatively low for its class compared to an F30 3 Series rated at 13 cubic feet (370 L). The ATS was available in four interior color combinations: Jet Black, Light Platinum with Jet Black, Kona Brown with Jet Black, and Morello Red with Jet Black. Three interior fabrics were available as seat trim materials: Leatherette, Leather, and Semi-Aniline leather. Standard features in the 2019 Cadillac ATS include dual-zone automatic climate control, proximity key entry, push-button start, remote start, a rearview camera, and the Teen Driver system. The 8-inch touchscreen infotainment system which came standard, features Bluetooth, three USB ports, voice recognition, a 12-speaker Bose surround-sound stereo, satellite radio, HD Radio, Android Auto and Apple CarPlay, wireless smartphone charging, and a 4G LTE Wi-Fi hotspot. Optional features include navigation, a sunroof, a 110-volt power outlet, and rain-sensing windshield wipers. The ATS features an instrument panel that wraps into the doors and a center stack in the mid-instrument panel that flows into the center console. The gauge cluster features LED lighting which allows for clear, at-a-glance viewing in all conditions, while ambient lighting emphasizes the functional elements of the console and doors.

=== Safety systems ===
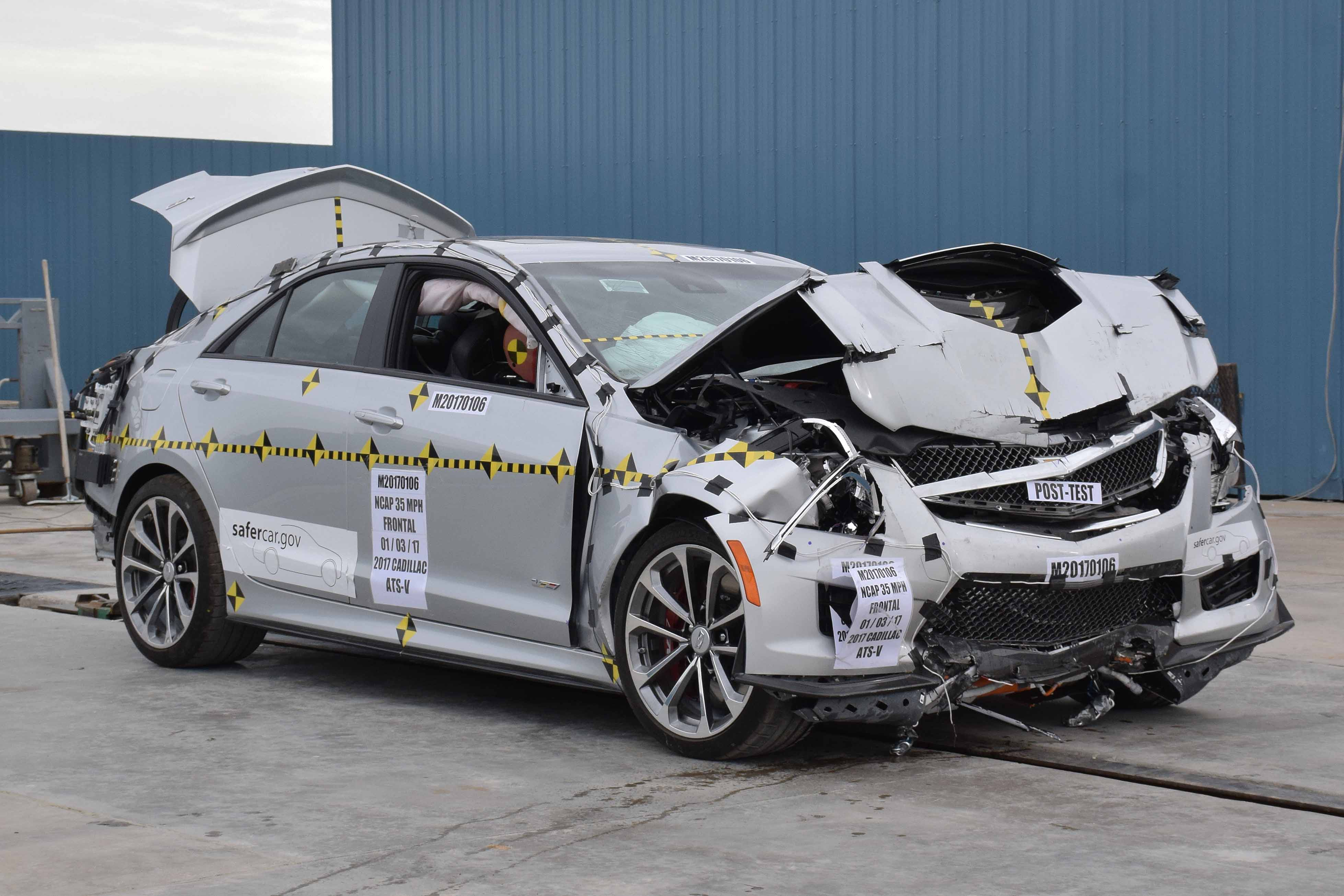
An NHTSA-tested 2017 ATS-V sedan. Full frontal-width test at 56 km/h (35 mph)

The ATS's safety development was based on what GM called a "control and alert" strategy, which makes effective use of advanced technologies to help avoid crashes. Don Butler, vice president of Cadillac marketing, said that the ATS features systems that can "react faster than humans". It features visual and acoustic alerts, depending on the alert feature, which helps drivers identify forthcoming crash incidents and intervene when a crash threat appears more imminent.

Available safety systems include adaptive cruise control, which senses traffic in front of the ATS to adjust the vehicle speed, including automatically stopping the vehicle in heavy traffic and accelerating again. This feature benefits from radar technology. Intelligent brake assist detects abrupt braking and applies full power to the brakes for quicker stopping. Forward collision alert also features radar technology which detects a possible crash and alerts the driver, giving them time to stop or switch lanes. If the driver does not react or react fast enough, autonomous emergency braking will apply the braking in an effort to avoid the crash. Lane departure warning warns the driver of unintentional lane changes. The rearview camera identifies traffic lane markings and provides acoustic alerts. Blind zone alert uses radar sensors placed on both sides of the car, which searches for other cars in blind zone areas of the car and lets the driver know using LED symbols in the outdoor mirrors. Rear cross-traffic alert warns the driver of traffic when backing out of a parking spot. Visual and acoustic alerts will be activated if moving vehicles are detected. The rearview camera allows for a view of objects directly behind the ATS, while the dynamic guidelines provide a reference that helps make parking and other maneuvers less complicated. A display is in the center stack infotainment system. The start assist applies the brakes for 1.5 seconds to prevent the vehicle from rolling back if the driver forgets to enable the parking brake.

The ATS features frontal and side airbags for the driver and front passenger, side curtain airbags for all, and knee protection airbags for driver and front passenger. The frontal airbags for the driver and front passenger also feature Passenger Sensing System and automatic passenger airbag suppression. Two packages are available: the ESS I includes lane departure warning, forward collision alert, rear thorax air bags and Rainsense wipers, while the ESS II features side blind zone alert, rear cross traffic alert, autonomous emergency braking, adaptive cruise control and a full-color head-up display.

==== Testing ====
Testing conducted by the National Highway Traffic and Safety Administration (NHTSA) scored the 2013 and 2014 ATS, in both rear- and all-wheel drive variants, at five stars in frontal crash, side crash and rollover protection, resulting in five stars overall, the highest possible score. The NHTSA noted the availability of three NHTSA recommended technologies on the ATS: electronic stability control, forward collision warning, and lane departure warning.

== Trim levels ==
In North America and other countries excluding China, the 2013 ATS was available in four trim levels at the time of its introduction: Standard, Luxury, Performance and Premium. Standard features on the base trim include 17-inch alloy wheels, heated mirrors, automatic headlights, aero grille, cruise control, dual-zone automatic climate control, six-way power front seats with power lumbar, vinyl upholstery, a tilt-and-telescoping steering wheel, General Motors' OnStar system, Bluetooth connectivity, a seven-speaker Bose sound system with satellite radio, and an auxiliary audio jack. On the base ATS, optional features include Cadillac User Experience infotainment system and an upgraded sound system, which adds HD Radio, an 8-inch touchscreen audio display, 10-speaker Bose sound system with a CD player, and a rearview camera.

Cadillac User Experience comes standard on the Luxury trim, which additionally adds run-flat tires, keyless entry and start, remote engine start for automatic transmission models, eight-way power front seats, front and rear parking sensors, an auto-dimming rearview mirror, leather seating, memory functions and a 60-40 split-folding rear seat. Adding to the Standard and Luxury trims, the Performance trim adds dual exhausts, a Driver Awareness package which comes with a variety of safety systems, xenon headlights, an upgraded 10-speaker Bose surround-sound audio system, and sporty front seats. The Premium trim adds 18-inch wheels, navigation system, and a color head-up display. Rear-wheel drive Premium trim levels additionally feature with run-flat summer tires, a sport-tuned suspension, adaptive suspension dampers and a limited-slip rear differential.

In China, at the time of the model's introduction, the ATS was available in five exterior colors and two interior colors over four trim levels: Standard, Luxury, Elite and Comfort.

== Powertrains ==
In mid-December 2011, Cadillac unveiled the newly developed 2.0-liter engine, intended for use in both the ATS and the Chevrolet Malibu. Extensive efforts went into minimizing friction, resulting in the engine being able to produce 90 percent of its torque at just 1,500 RPM. At the time, the ATS's 276 hp (206 kW) 2.0 engine had the highest specific output of any General Motors engine, and was the most power-dense engine certified by the Society of Automotive Engineers, at 138 hp (103 kW) per liter.

The ATS initially offered three engine options and two transmissions. The range started at the entry-level 2.5-liter LCV inline-four engine, producing an output of 202 hp (151 kW) and 190 lb⋅ft (258 N⋅m), available with a 6-speed automatic transmission. Its top speed is limited at 220 km/h (140 mph) and it has a 0–100 km/h acceleration of 7.5 seconds. A 2.0-liter LTG inline-four model available with either a 6-speed automatic or a 6-speed manual producing 272 hp (203 kW) and 260 lb⋅ft (353 N⋅m) was available at launch; its acceleration was rated at 5.9 to 6 seconds for rear-wheel drive models, while it was rated at 6.1 seconds for the all-wheel drive 6-speed automatic model. Each model had a top speed of 225 km/h (140 mph). Lastly, a 3.6 LFX engine, benefitting from a V6 configuration, was available, which produced an output of 321 hp (239 kW) and 274 lb⋅ft (371 N⋅m). Its 0–100 km/h acceleration was rated at 5.4 seconds, while its top speed was limited to 245 km/h (152 mph). General Motors had stated at debut that a diesel model of both the ATS and the CTS would be available, but these plans never came to fruition.

For the 2015 model year, Cadillac made minor engine adjustments, increasing torque figures for the 2.0-liter model by 47 N⋅m (35 lbf⋅ft), representing a 14 percent increase over the previous model. This was achieved by engine calibration that resulted in increased boost pressure for better performance. For the 2016 model year, Cadillac redesigned the 3.0 V6 engine with a new paddle-shift eight-speed automatic transmission. The 2.0-liter turbo and the 3.6-liter V6 models both introduced Stop/Start technology, while the 3.6 model added Active Fuel Management, a technology initially used by GM brands such as Holden, Chevrolet, and GMC which allows the V6 engine to "turn off" half of the cylinders. GM stated that this technology would enhance fuel economy up to an estimated 9 percent over the previous V6. The 2-door coupe variant went on sale in between the second and third quarters of 2014 as a 2015 model.

Due to the 23 percent decrease in sales of the ATS through May 2016, Cadillac decided to streamline the lineup for 2017 by discontinuing the 2.5-liter engine, leaving the 272 hp (203 kW) 2.0-liter turbo inline-four engine as the ATS' entry-level offering.

| Displacement | Fuel type | Engine code | Configuration | Aspiration | Power | Torque | Layout | Transmission | Model years |
|---|---|---|---|---|---|---|---|---|---|
| 2,499 cc (2.5 L) | Gasoline | LCV | I4 | Natural | 151 kW (202 hp) @ 6300 rpm | 258 N⋅m (190 lb⋅ft) @ 4400 rpm | FR | 6-speed automatic | 2013–2015 |
| 2,499 cc (2.5 L) | Gasoline | LCV | I4 | Natural | 151 kW (202 hp) @ 6300 rpm | 258 N⋅m (190 lb⋅ft) @ 4400 rpm | FR | 8-speed automatic | 2016 |
| 1,998 cc (2.0 L) | Gasoline | LTG | I4 | Turbocharged | 203 kW (272 hp) @ 5500 rpm | 353 N⋅m (260 lb⋅ft) @ 1700-5500 rpm | FR, F4 (optional) | 6-speed automatic, 6-speed manual (optional) | 2013–2014 |
| 1,998 cc (2.0 L) | Gasoline | LTG | I4 | Turbocharged | 203 kW (272 hp) @ 5500 rpm | 400 N⋅m (295 lb⋅ft) @ 3000-4600 rpm | FR, F4 (optional) | 6-speed automatic, 6-speed manual (optional) | 2015 |
| 1,998 cc (2.0 L) | Gasoline | LTG | I4 | Turbocharged | 203 kW (272 hp) @ 5500 rpm | 400 N⋅m (295 lb⋅ft) @ 3000-4600 rpm | FR, F4 (optional) | 8-speed automatic, 6-speed manual (optional) | 2016–2019 |
| 3,564 cc (3.6 L) | Gasoline | LFX | V6 | Natural | 239 kW (321 hp) @ 6800 rpm | 371 N⋅m (274 lb⋅ft) @ 4800 rpm | FR, F4 (optional) | 6-speed automatic | 2013–2015 |
| 3,649 cc (3.6 L) | Gasoline | LGX | V6 | Natural | 250 kW (335 hp) @ 6800 rpm | 386 N⋅m (285 lb⋅ft) @ 5300 rpm | FR, F4 (optional) | 8-speed automatic | 2016–2019 |
| 3,564 cc (3.6 L) | Gasoline | LF4 | V6 | Turbocharged | 346 kW (464 hp) @ 5850 rpm | 603 N⋅m (445 lb⋅ft) @ 3500 rpm | FR | 8-speed automatic (optional); 6-speed manual | 2016–2019 |

EPA estimated fuel economy

EPA estimated fuel economy
| Engine | Transmission | Drivetrain | City Rating | Highway Rating |
|---|---|---|---|---|
| 2.5-liter I4 | Automatic | RWD | 22 mpg_{‑US} (11 L/100 km; 26 mpg_{‑imp}) | 33 mpg_{‑US} (7.1 L/100 km; 40 mpg_{‑imp}) |
| 2.0-liter turbo I4 | Automatic | RWD | 21 mpg_{‑US} (11 L/100 km; 25 mpg_{‑imp}) | 31 mpg_{‑US} (7.6 L/100 km; 37 mpg_{‑imp}) |
| 2.0-liter turbo I4 | Automatic | AWD | 20 mpg_{‑US} (12 L/100 km; 24 mpg_{‑imp}) | 30 mpg_{‑US} (7.8 L/100 km; 36 mpg_{‑imp}) |
| 2.0-liter turbo I4 | Manual | RWD | 19 mpg_{‑US} (12 L/100 km; 23 mpg_{‑imp}) | 30 mpg_{‑US} (7.8 L/100 km; 36 mpg_{‑imp}) |
| 3.6-liter turbo V6 | Automatic/Manual | RWD | 19 mpg_{‑US} (12 L/100 km; 23 mpg_{‑imp}) | 28 mpg_{‑US} (8.4 L/100 km; 34 mpg_{‑imp}) |
| 3.6-liter V6 | Automatic | AWD | 18 mpg_{‑US} (13 L/100 km; 22 mpg_{‑imp}) | 26 mpg_{‑US} (9.0 L/100 km; 31 mpg_{‑imp}) |

== Model year changes ==
=== 2015 ===
In May 2014, Cadillac announced the ATS would receive a minor facelift to better replicate its coupe counterpart. The front received the updated Cadillac emblem, which removed the laurel wreaths around it and increased the emblem's size. Featuring a more streamlined design, the recently released ATS Coupe was the first Cadillac model to adopt the new badge, the second being its four-door counterpart. The other large change was the redesigned lower grille. The outgoing model featured a three-piece unit with added chrome detailing and vertical fog lamps. The facelift reunited the three-piece grille into a singular unit, horizontally crossed by a slim chrome line. The ATS offered two new colors: Crystal White Tricoat and Dark Adriatic Blue Metallic. Cabin changes were more significant as the model featured revised upholstery and trim combinations as well as additional safety systems and features. The CUE infotainment system was updated with Text Message Alerts, Siri Eyes Free compatibility, and a Teen Driver function that enables owners to set a radio volume limit and establish a speed warning between 40–70 mph (64–113 km/h), among other features. The model could be optioned with Cadillac's DockSpot inductive charger which can recharge compatible smartphones without plugging it in.

=== 2016 ===
For 2016, Cadillac made slight modifications to the engines of the ATS, and added start-stop technology on some models. The ATS was available with a Hydra-Matic 8L45 paddle-shift eight-speed automatic transmission, updated safety systems replacing ESS I and II, Cadillac User Experience enhancements, including Apple CarPlay and Android Auto capability, and new exterior colors, including Cocoa Bronze Metallic, Moonstone Metallic, and Stellar Black Metallic.

=== 2017 ===
Cadillac updated the ATS significantly for 2017. For customer clarity, trims levels were renamed Standard, Luxury, Premium Luxury and Premium Performance. 17-inch premium alloy wheels, 17-inch alloy wheels, and 17-inch Sterling Silver premium alloy wheels were slightly altered. The Sterling Silver wheels were discontinued, but the other two were revised. A Carbon Black sport package, which blacks out the chrome and adds body-colored door handles and spoiler, were also available for 2017, in addition to optional Recaro seats, complementing the Cadillac signature exterior and interior design. Exterior color options for this model included Black Raven, Phantom Gray Metallic, Red Obsession Tintcoat and Crystal White Tricoat, while interior colors included Jet Black or Light Platinum.

=== 2018 ===
For 2018, Cadillac removed the Moonstone Metallic, Deep Amethyst Metallic, and Bronze Dune Metallic colors, with the addition of the Satin Steel Metallic color. The Carbon Black Package and Black Sport Appearance Package were discontinued, and the CD glovebox was removed. An updated CUE system was introduced, and the heated steering wheel was replaced with an automatic heated steering wheel, which turns on automatically based on ambient air temperature.

== ATS-L ==
In July 2014, Cadillac announced that it would be producing a long wheelbase version of the ATS for the Chinese market, known as the ATS-L. The ATS-L has a wheelbase 85 mm (3.3 in) longer than the standard ATS sedan, and was manufactured in China by Shanghai GM.

Prior to the introduction of the ATS-L, standard wheelbase vehicles had been imported to China from GM's Lansing manufacturing facility in Michigan. However, 2014 models intended for the Chinese market were built at a recently established factory in Shanghai. GM invested approximately US$1.3 billion on building the factory, for which the ATS-L, exclusive to the market, would be produced in. The 2.0 liter LTG turbocharged petrol engine is standard across the range producing 230 and 279 horsepower. The ATS-L previously ran on the GM 6T70 automatic gearbox for 2014 and 2015, and used the GM 8L45 automatic gearbox from 2016 to 2019. Trim levels are known as the 25T and 28T. Production ended in September 2019.

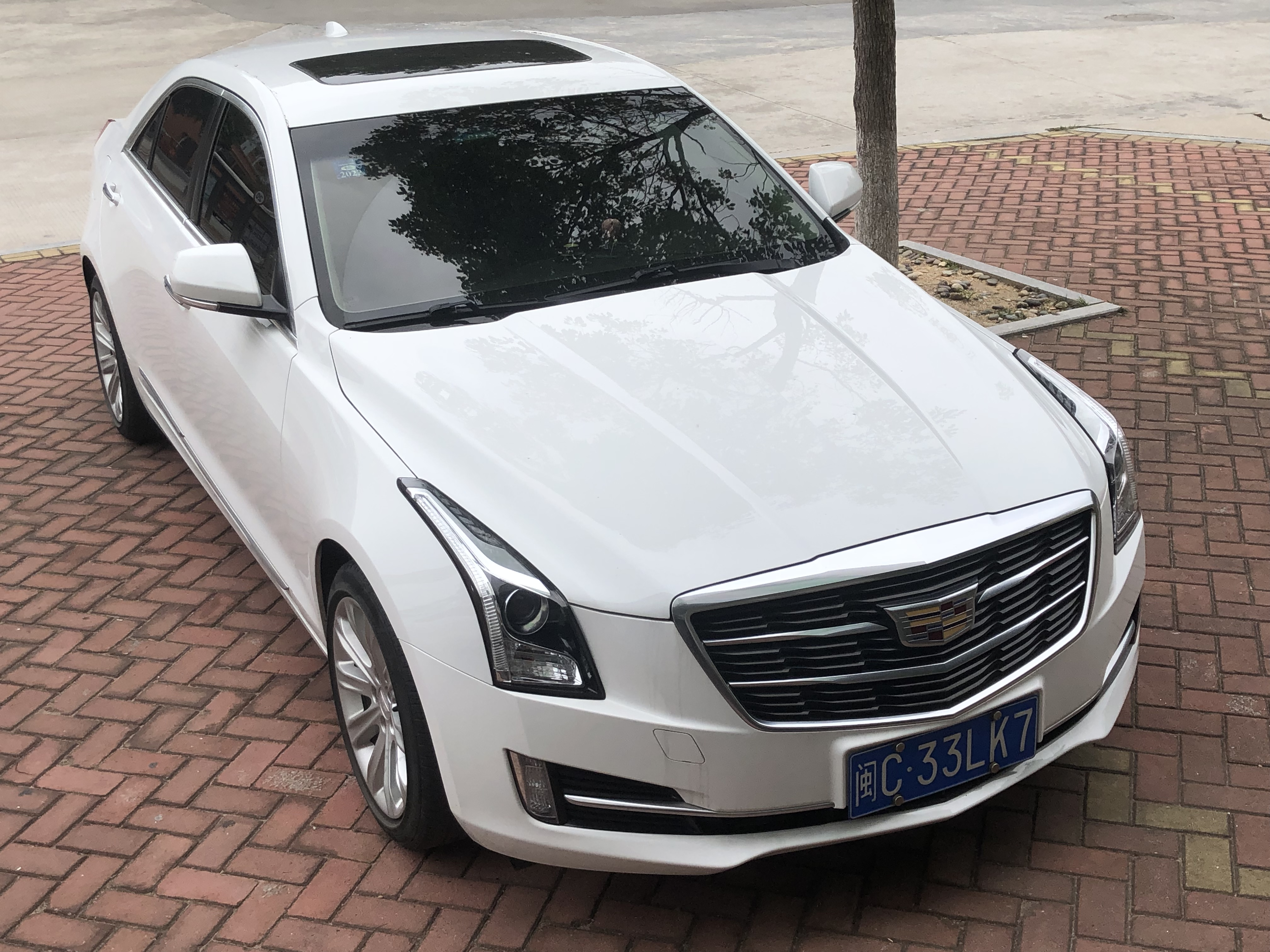
Cadillac ATS-L

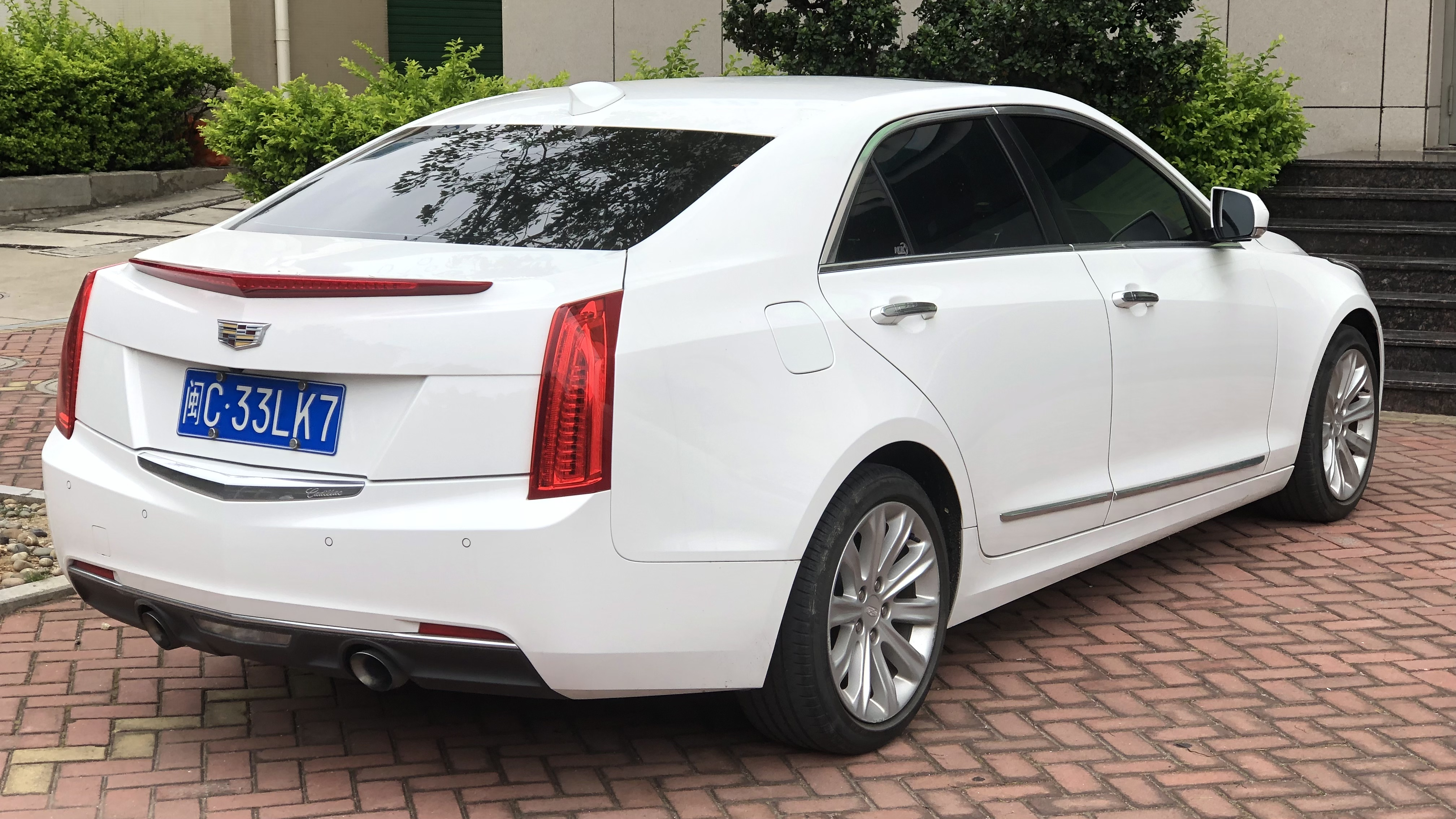
Cadillac ATS-L

=== Sales ===
| Calendar year | China |
|---|---|
| 2014 | 4,855 |
| 2015 | 30,801 |
| 2016 | 37,636 |
| 2017 | 55,682 |
| 2018 | 57,227 |
| 2019 | 26,020 |

== Coupe ==
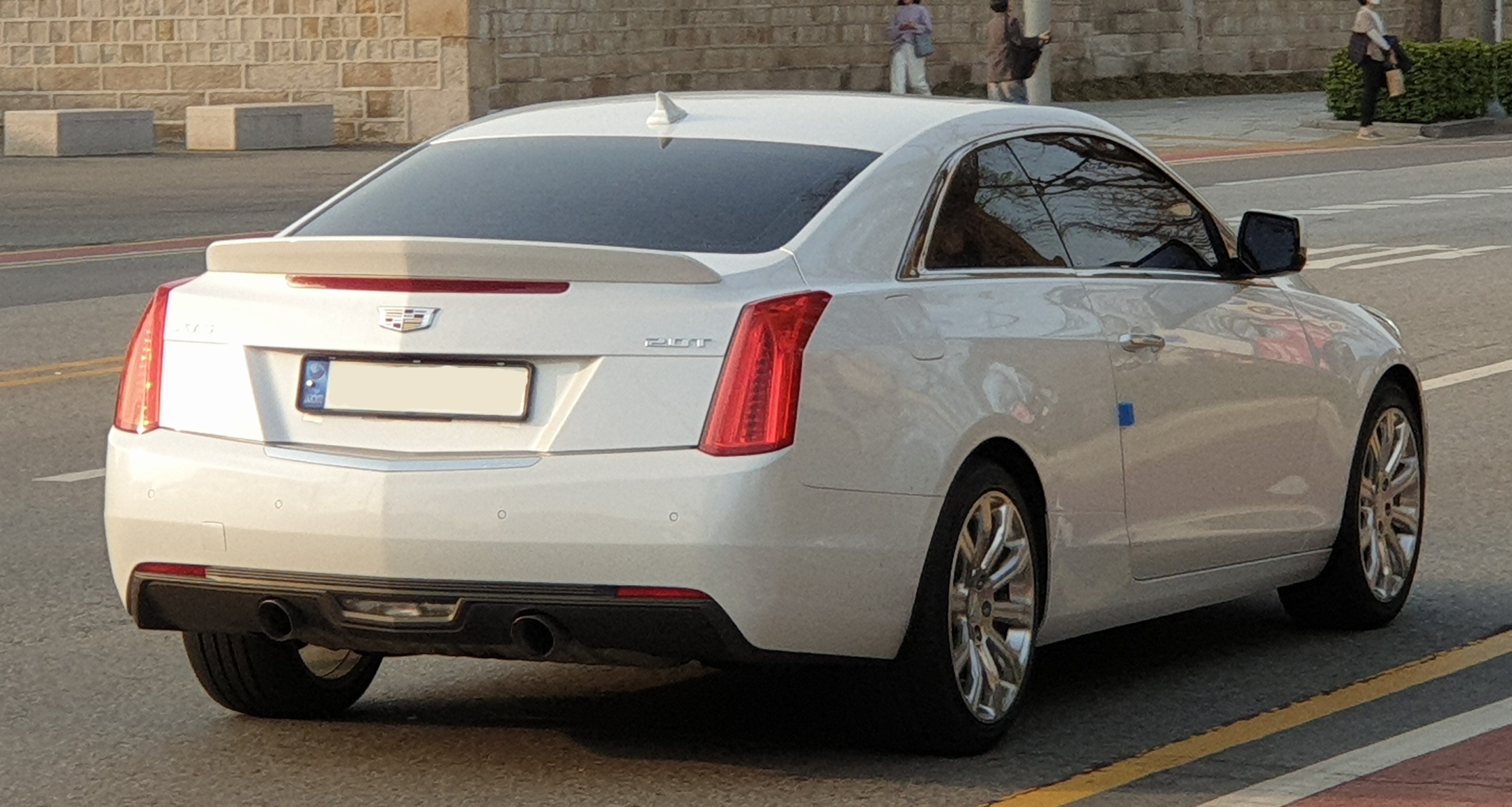
Cadillac ATS Coupe 2.0T

The 2015 Cadillac ATS Coupe, intended to compete with the Mercedes-Benz C-Class Coupe and the BMW 4 Series, debuted at the 2014 Detroit Auto Show, and went on sale in the summer of 2014. Slightly longer and wider than the sedan model, two models were available at launch: a 2.0 L four-cylinder engine with 272 hp (203 kW) and 295 lb⋅ft (400 N⋅m) of torque, and the other with a 3.6 L engine with 321 hp (239 kW) and 275 lb⋅ft (373 N⋅m) of torque. Choices were between a six-speed manual or a six-speed automatic transmission, and standard rear-wheel drive with optional all-wheel drive. The wider track of the ATS Coupe improves the steering precision and response. The roof was lowered, contributing towards a lower center of gravity, reducing roll and improving steering response. The 2015 Cadillac ATS Coupe was the first production model to wear Cadillac's newly revised brand logo without its previous laurel wreath, and was first shown on the Cadillac Elmiraj concept car. The ATS coupe received 4G LTE connectivity with a WiFi hotspot, CUE interface with Siri Eyes Free capability, and a Bose stereo with 12 speakers. GM discontinued the ATS compact executive coupe after the 2019 model year without any replacement planned due to poor sales and the growing popularity of crossovers and SUVs. However, the sedan version of the ATS was replaced by the Cadillac CT4 sedan for the 2020 model year.

== ATS-V ==
Cadillac ATS-V
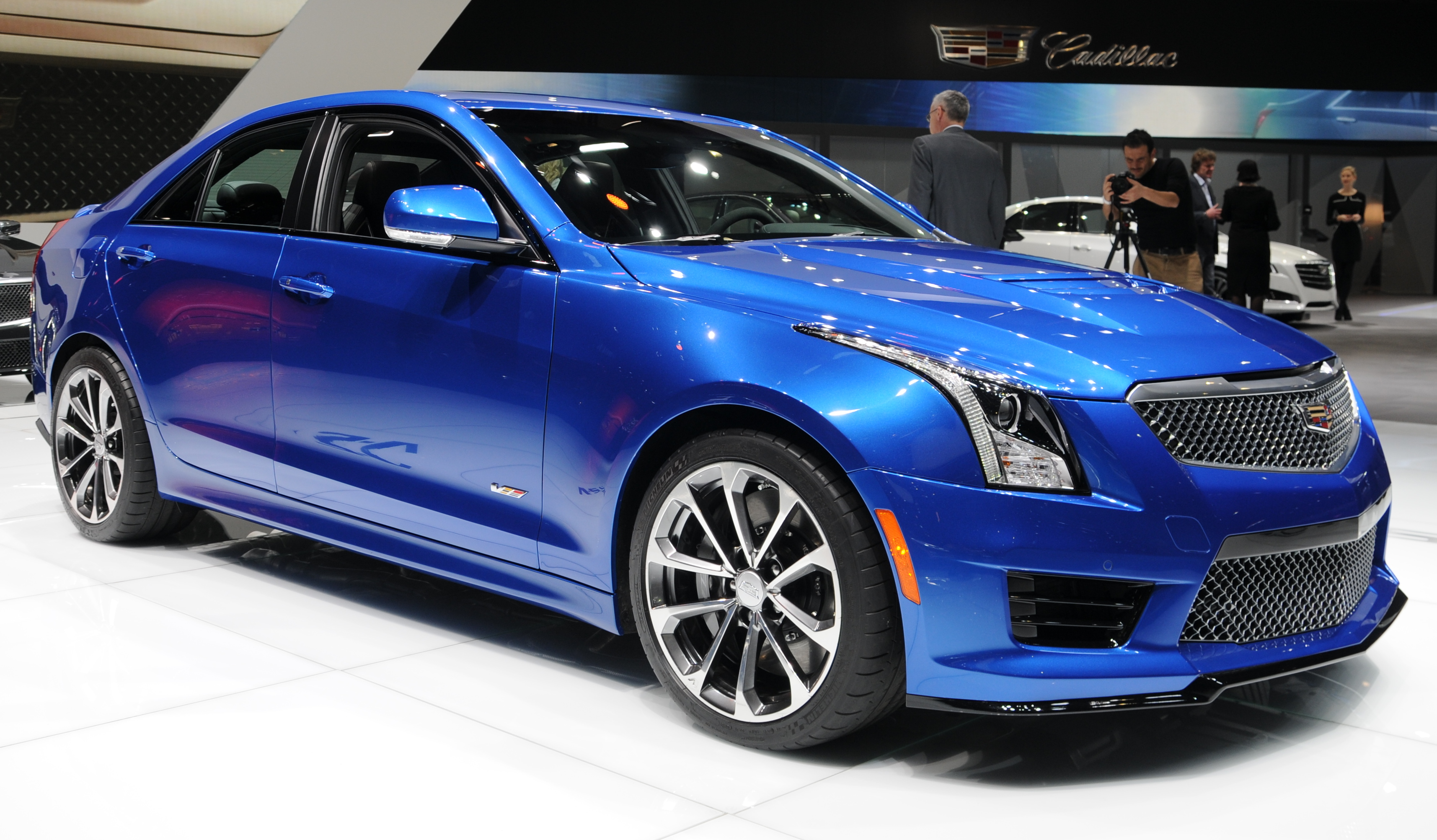

Overview
- Manufacturer: General Motors
- Production: March 2015 – December 2018
- Model years: 2016–2019
- Designer: Henri Kavaja (exterior)

Body and chassis
- Body style: 4-door sedan; 2-door coupe
- Layout: Front-engine, rear-wheel-drive

Powertrain
- Engine: 3.6 L LF4 twin-turbo DOHC V6
- Transmission: 6-speed manual 8-speed automatic

Chronology
- Successor: Cadillac CT4-V Blackwing

The Cadillac ATS-V is the high-performance variant of the ATS compact executive sedan and coupe. The coupe variant was revealed in early November 2014, while the four-door was revealed eight days later. Designed to compete with the Mercedes-Benz AMG C 63 and the BMW M3/M4 (for the coupe), the ATS-V was available exclusively in a rear-wheel drive configuration. The ATS-V opened orders in February 2015, and started production in March of that year. Tony Roma was chief engineer on the ATS-V, and had also chief engineered the third-generation CTS-V. The ATS-V has settings that allow the driver to adjust vehicle parameters like steering, suspension, and throttle. Offering a 0 to 60 time of 3.9 seconds, its tested top speed was rated at 189 mph (304 km/h). Power and torque outputs were rated at a SAE-certified 346 kW (464 hp) and 603 N⋅m (445 lbf⋅ft) respectively. The hood is made of carbon fiber, which has an air-extraction vent that removes hot air out of the engine compartment. The ATS-V features a Brembo high-performance brake system developed to provide durability and capability for track day car performance. The transmission options are a Tremec TR6060 six-speed manual with active revolution matching and launch control, or a HydraMatic 8L90 eight-speed automatic with launch control and Performance Algorithm Shift.

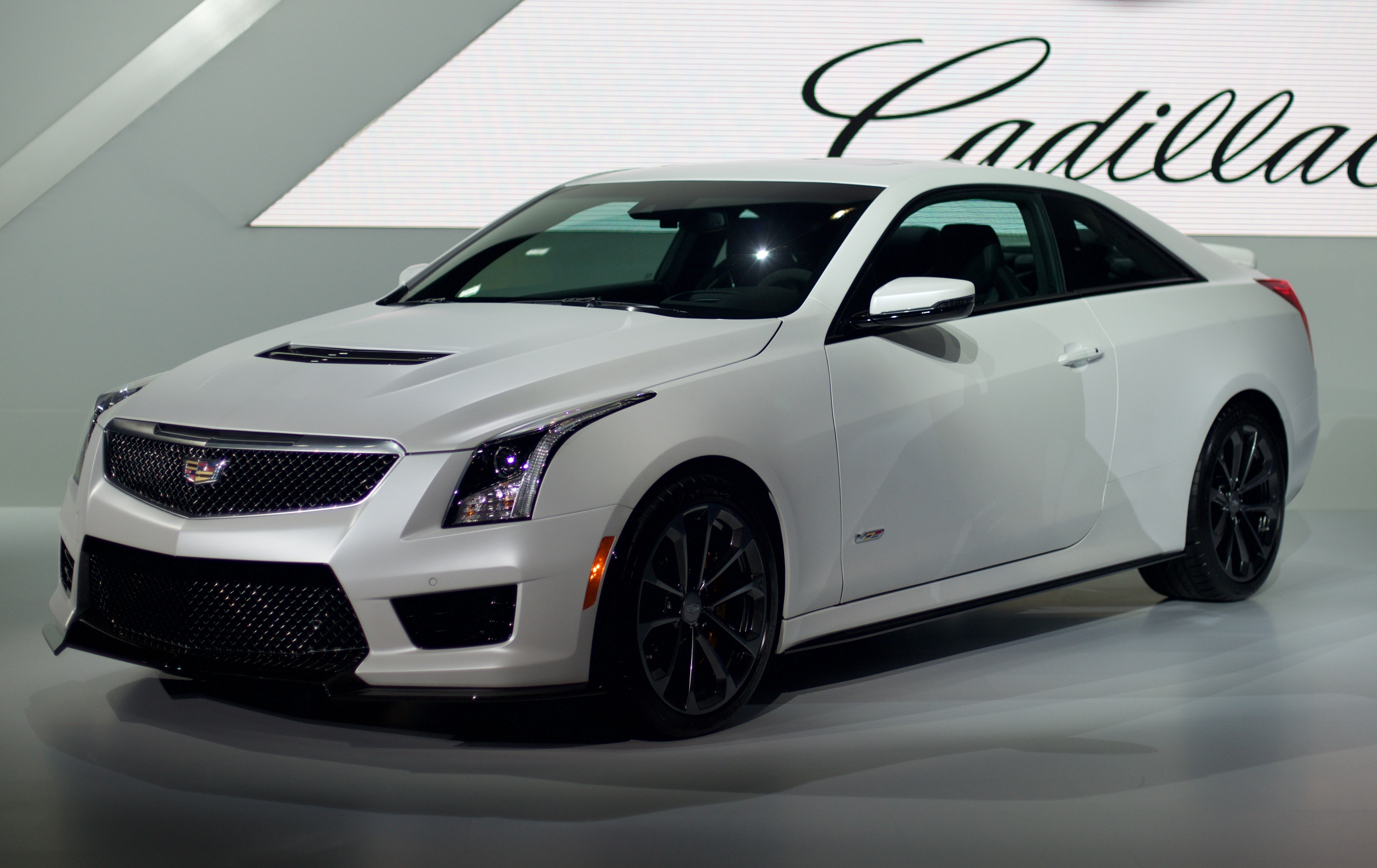
Cadillac ATS-V Coupe

Motor Trend conducted a comparison between the BMW M3, ATS-V, and AMG C63-S. The Cadillac managed to accelerate faster than both German vehicles, and was the fastest around Willow Springs International Motorsports Park; it was also the least expensive in the test.

The ATS-V sedan was replaced by the Cadillac CT4-V. The coupe ATS-V was discontinued without replacement.

== Motorsport ==
=== ATS-V.R GT3 ===
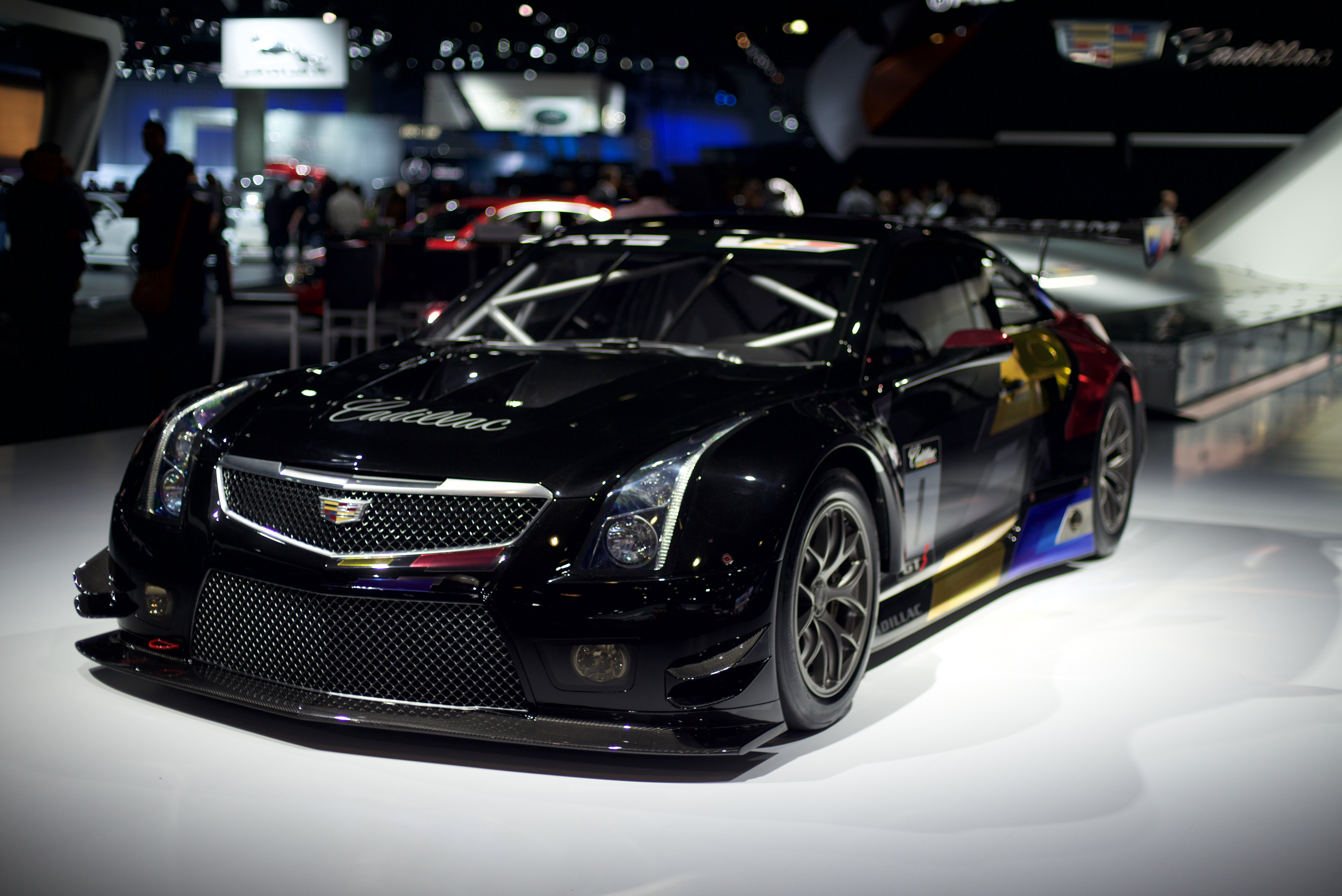
The Cadillac ATS-V.R GT3 on display at the 2014 LA Auto Show

On November 14, 2014, Cadillac unveiled the ATS-V.R, a racing variant of the forthcoming ATS-V developed to SRO GT3 specifications in partnership with Pratt & Miller. The car was introduced as the successor to the Cadillac CTS-V.R. It was powered by the LF4.R, a race-tuned version of the 3.6-liter twin-turbocharged V6 used in the production ATS-V. Key modifications included larger BorgWarner turbochargers, more efficient intercoolers, a Bosch MS 5.1 engine control unit, direct side-exit exhausts, and a bespoke rear transaxle among numerous other changes.

The ATS-V.R debuted in the Pirelli World Challenge for the 2015 season as part of a factory-backed effort. With Cadillac treating 2015 as a development year, a customer racing program was not pursued. The car achieved immediate success with Johnny O'Connell securing the driver's championship in the GT category and Cadillac finishing third in the manufacturer's standings. In 2016, Michael Cooper and O'Connell would finish third and fourth in the driver's championship respectively, while Cadillac again placed third among manufacturers. The 2017 season saw Cadillac's best result in the manufacturer's championship with a second place finish as Cooper and O'Connell placed second and sixth respectively in the driver's standings.

On September 28, 2017, Cadillac announced its withdrawal from the Pirelli World Challenge, bringing an end to the ATS-V.R program without a successor. Although the possibility of a future return was left open, the ATS-V.R has not competed since. Its absence from privateer competition stemming from Cadillac's decision not to offer the car to customer teams has since been cited as a contributing factor in SRO Motorsports Group's introduction of minimum production requirements for GT3 cars.

== Sales ==
The following table represents sales figures for the ATS in both the United States and other markets.

| Calendar year | United States | Global |
|---|---|---|
| 2012 | 7,008 | |
| 2013 | 38,319 | |
| 2014 | 29,890 | 46,648 |
| 2015 | 26,873 | 63,049 |
| 2016 | 21,505 | |
| 2017 | 13,100 | |
| 2018 | 10,859 | |
| 2019 | 1,134 | |
| 2020 | 116 | |
