= Tremec TR-3160 transmission =

Manual transmission for light delivery vehicles

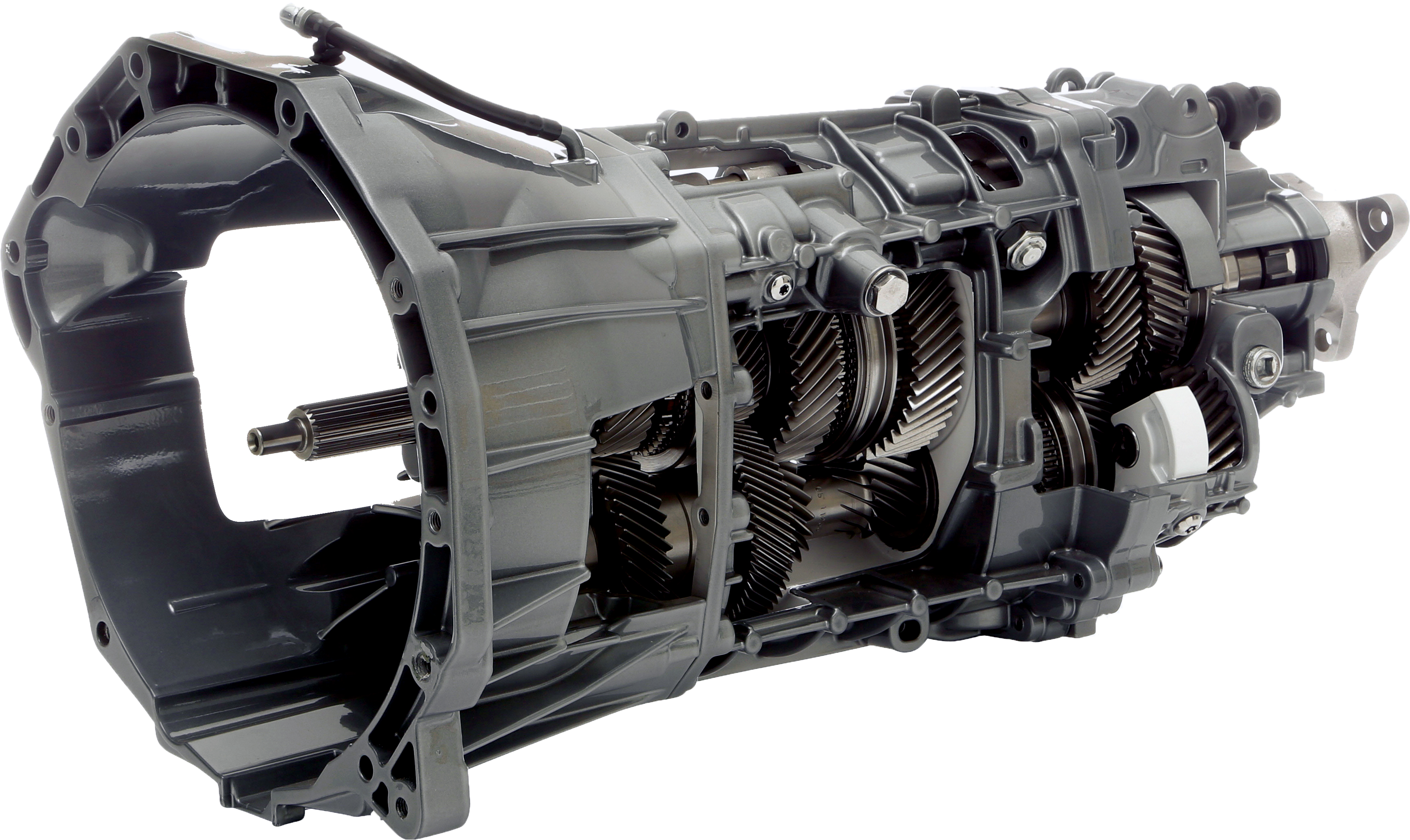
Cut-away view of the TREMEC TR-3160 transmission

The TREMEC TR-3160 is a six-speed RWD manual transmission that features six forward speeds and one reverse speed. It is manufactured by TREMEC (formerly Transmission Technologies Corporation).

The TR-3160 is designed for either a single or double overdrive application and is used for light delivery vans, light commercial vehicles, or performance vehicle applications.

Based on an 81mm center distance, the TR-3160 utilizes high strength steel on all gears and shafts - maximizing torque capacity and durability while minimizing weight and package size. High capacity tapered bearings and high capacity synchronizers contribute to low shift efforts and shifter travel. All gears are hard-finished.

The multi-rail shift system accommodates direct mount and semi-remote shifter locations that provide greater flexibility while reducing noise, vibration and harshness (NVH).

TR-3160 features:

- Rear-wheel drive, six-speed manual transmission available with single or double overdrive
- Double and triple cone synchronizers feature hybrid and sintered bronze friction material
- Multi-rail shift system accommodates direct mount or semi-remote shifter locations
- High-precision guide plate
- Advanced interlock system
- Anti-friction roller ball detents
- Hollow shafts and webbed gears
- Three-piece end load design aluminum housing
- Low-friction linear shift rail bearings
- Dry weight is 55 kg (121 lb) in base configuration; 51 kg (112 lb) with mass reduction

== Applications ==
- 2013–2019 Cadillac ATS
- 2016–2024 Chevrolet Camaro (2.0T or 3.6L engine)
- 2016–2020 Ford Mustang Shelby GT350
- 2021-2023 Ford Mustang Mach 1
- 2024-present Ford Mustang Dark Horse

== Selected Gear Ratios ==
Model	1st	2nd	3rd	4th	5th	6th	Reverse
Cadillac ATS	4.12	2.62	1.81	1.30	1.00	0.80	3.75
Chevrolet Camaro	4.40	2.59	1.80	1.34	1.00	0.75	3.99
Ford Mustang Shelby GT350	3.25	2.23	1.61	1.24	1.00	0.63	2.95
Ford Mustang Mach 1	3.25	2.23	1.61	1.24	1.00	0.63	2.95
Ford Mustang Dark Horse	3.25	2.23	1.61	1.24	1.00	0.63	2.95

== See also ==
- Tremec
