= 1986 SCCA/Escort Endurance Championship =

Seasons
- ← 1985 1987 →

The 1986 SCCA/Escort Endurance Championship season was the second year of the SCCA Endurance Championship. It was the first season of title sponsorship by Escort, replacing title sponsor Playboy Magazine from the previous season. The class structure was also modified, adding the Super Sports (SS) class and combining the C class of the previous year into the B class. The per race purse was set to US$28,000 and the year-end points fund grew to $80,000 - to be split among the four classes.

== Schedule ==
Round	Race	Length	Circuit	Location	Date
1	6 Hours of Sears Point	6 hours	(United States) Sears Point International Raceway	Sonoma, California	April 26
2	Toyo Tire Shrine Cup Twin 4 Hours of Portland	Twin 4 hours	(United States) Portland International Raceway	Portland, Oregon	May 11
3	24 Hour Longest Day of Nelson	24 hours	(United States) Nelson Ledges Road Course	Warren, Ohio	June 28–29
4	Albany Classic Cars/Mobil Oil 6 Hours of Road Atlanta	6 hours	(United States) Road Atlanta	Braselton, Georgia	July 20
5	Budweiser 24 Hours of Mosport	24 hours	(Canada) Mosport Park	Bowmanville, Ontario	August 8–10
6	24 Hours of Mid Ohio	24 hours	(United States) Mid-Ohio Sports Car Course	Lexington, Ohio	September 28–29

== Race results ==
Round	Circuit	GT winning car	SS winning car	A winning car	B winning car	Report
Round	Circuit	GT winning drivers	SS winning drivers	A winning drivers	B winning drivers	Report
1	(United States) Sears Point	No. 08 Delta G Racing Porsche 944	No. 74 Rippie Anderson Motorsports Chevrolet Corvette	No. 87 Team Mitsubishi 87 Mitsubishi Starion	No. 35 Quantum Engineering No. 35 Honda CRX-Si	Report
1	(United States) Sears Point	Geoff Provo, Gregg Doran, Barney Gardner	Parker Johnston, Bill Cooper	Mike Rutherford, Ray Kong	Ran Haase, Scott Gaylord, Lance Stewart	Report
2	(United States) Portland	No. 08 Delta G Racing Porsche 944	No. 4 Bakeracing No. 4 Chevrolet Corvette	No. 88 Team Mitsubishi 88 Mitsubishi Starion	No. 20 Coyote Enterprises Mitsubishi Starion	Report
2	(United States) Portland	Geoff Provo, Gregg Doran	Bobby Archer, Tommy Archer	Peter Farrell, Dave Vegher	Wiley Timbrook, Bob Gill	Report
3	(United States) Nelson Ledges	No. 11 Carlsen Porsche Racing 11 Porsche 944	No. 98 Morrison-Cook Motor Sports No. 2 Chevrolet Corvette	No. 87 Dave Wolin Mitsubishi 87 Mitsubishi Starion	No. 33 Quantum Engineering No. 33 Honda CRX-Si	Report
3	(United States) Nelson Ledges	Paul McIntosh, Bruce MacInnes, Larry Bleil	Don Knowles, John Heinricy, Bob McConnell	Mike Rutherford, Ray Kong, Bob Sweet, Charles Downes, Dave Vegher, John Norris	Bruce Short, John Green, Donna Sue Landon, Doug Peterson	Report
4	(United States) Road Atlanta	No. 11 Carlsen Porsche Racing 11 Porsche 944	No. 5 Bakeracing No. 4 Chevrolet Corvette	No. 53 Team Shelby 53 Dodge Shelby Charger	No. 35 Quantum Engineering No. 35 Honda CRX-Si	Report
4	(United States) Road Atlanta	Paul McIntosh, Kees Nierop	Kim Baker, Bobby Archer, Tommy Archer	Garth Ullom, Tim Evans	Ran Haase, Scott Gaylord, Lance Stewart	Report
5	(Canada) Mosport Park	No. 19 Saleen Autosport Saleen Mustang	No. 4 Bakeracing No. 4 Chevrolet Corvette	No. 53 Team Shelby 53 Dodge Shelby Charger	No. 39 CGJ/Phoenix Racing VW Scirocco GTX	Report
5	(Canada) Mosport Park	Steve Saleen, Desiré Wilson, Lisa Caceres, Rick Titus, Skeeter McKitterick, Tom Winters	Kim Baker, Bobby Archer, Tommy Archer, Mitch Wright, John Dinkel	Garth Ullom, Tim Evans, Jack Broomall	Bill Pate, Alistair Oag, Phil Pate, Peter Schwartzott	Report
6	(United States) Mid-Ohio	Chevrolet Camaro	Chevrolet Corvette	Dodge Shelby Charger	VW Scirocco GTX	Report
6	(United States) Mid-Ohio	Norton, Warner, S. Hendricks, L. Hendricks	B. Archer, T. Archer, K. Baker, Wright, Dinkel	Ullom, Evans, Broomall, Hannemann	Schwartzott, Oag, B. Pate, P. Pate	Report
