= GT World Challenge America =

Racing series

- Category: Group GT3
- Country: United States
- Inaugural season: 1984
- Tire suppliers: Pirelli
- Drivers' champion: (United States) Robby Foley (United States) Justin Rothberg
- Makes' champion: (Germany) Porsche
- Teams' champion: (United States) Turner Motorsport
- Official website: www.gt-world-challenge-america.com

GT World Challenge America is a North American auto racing series launched in 1990 by the Sports Car Club of America. It has been managed by the SRO Motorsports Group since 2018, and has been sanctioned by the United States Auto Club since 2017.

The GT World Challenge America is currently exclusive for GT3 class racecars since 2019. Each weekend features a single three-hour race beginning in 2026.

The series functions as the highest level of SRO Motorsports America race weekends, supported by the Pirelli GT4 America, GT America, Toyota GR Cup North America, TC America, and McLaren Trophy America series.

== History ==
The Sports Car Club of America created a "showroom stock" class for amateur club racing in 1972. In 1984, following the success of the Longest Day of Nelson and another 24-hour race at Mid-Ohio, the SCCA combined existing races into a manufacturer's championship. For 1985, the series became a 6-race professional championship with sponsorship from Playboy magazine. Escort radar detectors sponsored the series from 1986 until 1991.

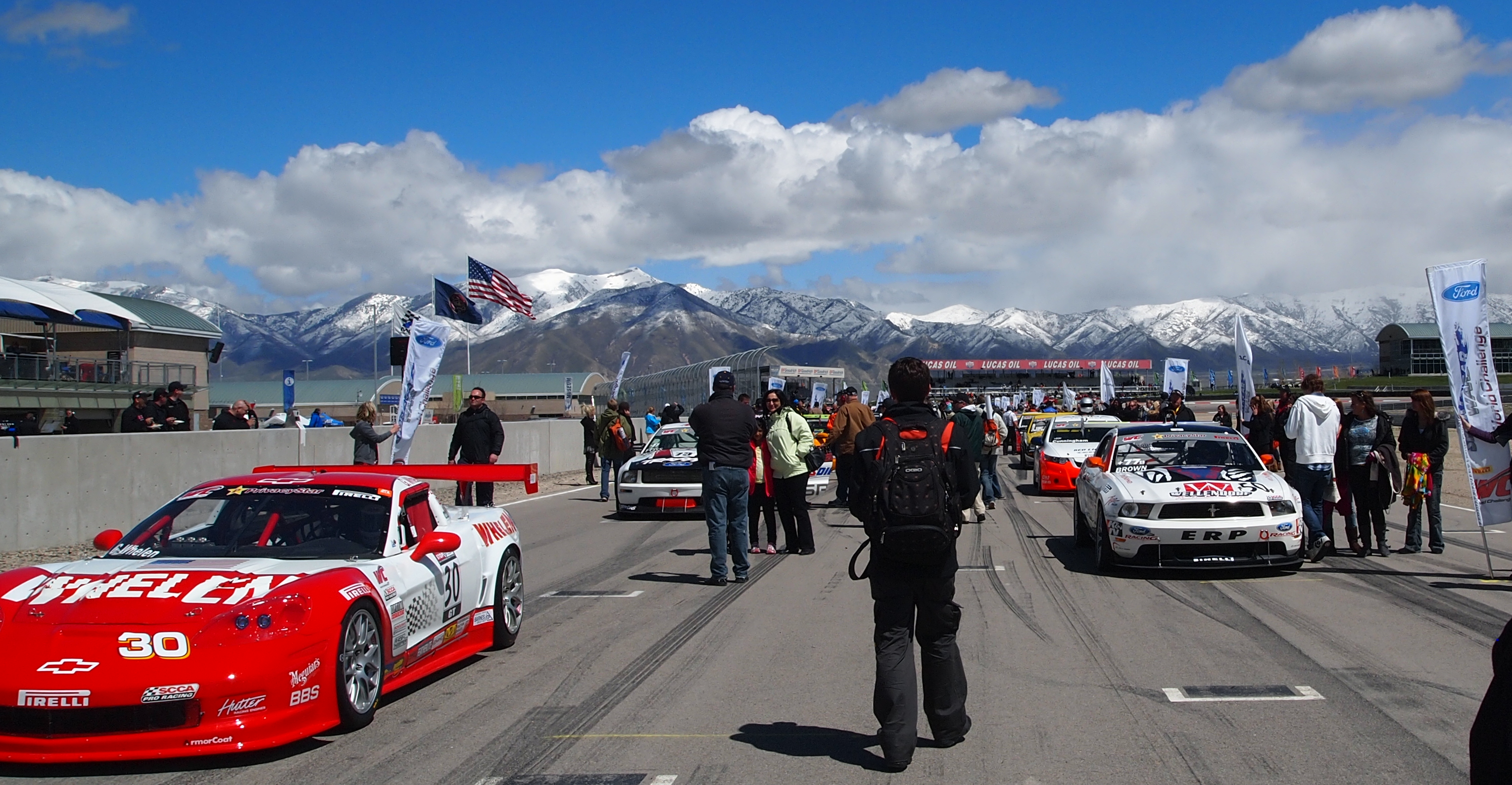
Fans invited to tour starting grid before 2011 season race

In 1990, the series was officially named World Challenge and was restructured to adopt rules similar to the European Group A for homologated production cars. The higher-cost "sports" classes were dropped after 1996, leaving the class format as it would stand until 2010. Speedvision TV network began sponsoring the series in 1999. With fields growing, the series began separate races for the GT and Touring classes in 2000, which would remain until 2010. In 2010, the series moved away from the partnership with SPEED, and signed a broadcast partnership with Versus (now NBCSN) for coverage. The series moved existing touring cars into a new GTS class, while changing the rules for the touring car class to reduce costs and keep cars closer to stock.

With the SpeedVision television contract, the World Challenge eventually succeeded Trans Am as the SCCA's premier series.

In July 2008, the World Challenge series was purchased by WC Vision, a group of investors. The Sports Car Club of America remained the sanctioning partner of the series.

From 2010 to 2015, each weekend had one or multiple single-driver races.

Starting with the 2011 season, the series signed a partnership with Pirelli and the leading tire manufacturer became the official tire supplier and title sponsor of the series.

Starting in 2013, FIA Group GT3 class cars are now approved to compete in the class.

In 2014, the Pirelli World Challenge established a GT-A classification similar to the FIA's bronze category.

In 2015, the series established GT Cup, featuring Porsche 991 Cup Cars that ran as part of the overall GT class races. Also, CBS Sports Network and Motor Trend On Demand became the new television partners.

In 2016, the series established a SprintX championship featuring 60-minute two-driver races, while the single-driver races were rebranded as Sprint. Also, as part of the partnership with the SRO, the GTS class was expanded to include GT4 homologations.

For 2017, the Pirelli World Challenge transferred to USAC as its sanctioning body. GT Cup class was expanded to include Cup cars from Lamborghini and Ferrari, while SprintX classes expand in both driver classification specificity and competition-legal platforms.

On May 25, 2018, it was announced that the Stéphane Ratel Organisation (SRO) had become majority shareholder of WC Vision LLC, and thus majority owner of Pirelli World Challenge.

For 2019, the series acquired a new title sponsor as part of the overhaul of the SRO series. The GT Sprint Cup in Europe and GT Series Asia will now be known as the Blancpain GT World Challenge Europe and Asia, respectively. The current World Challenge will became the GT World Challenge America. Also it adopted a GT3-only series, moving away from multi class racing. The Sprint and SprintX parallel championships were abolished, and a new 90-minute two-driver race format was adopted.

On October 2020, the SRO Motorsports Group announced the creation of a separate series (GT America Series) to split off from existing sprint formats to serve as a cost-effective alternative for single drivers and Bronze-rated pilots.

== Format ==
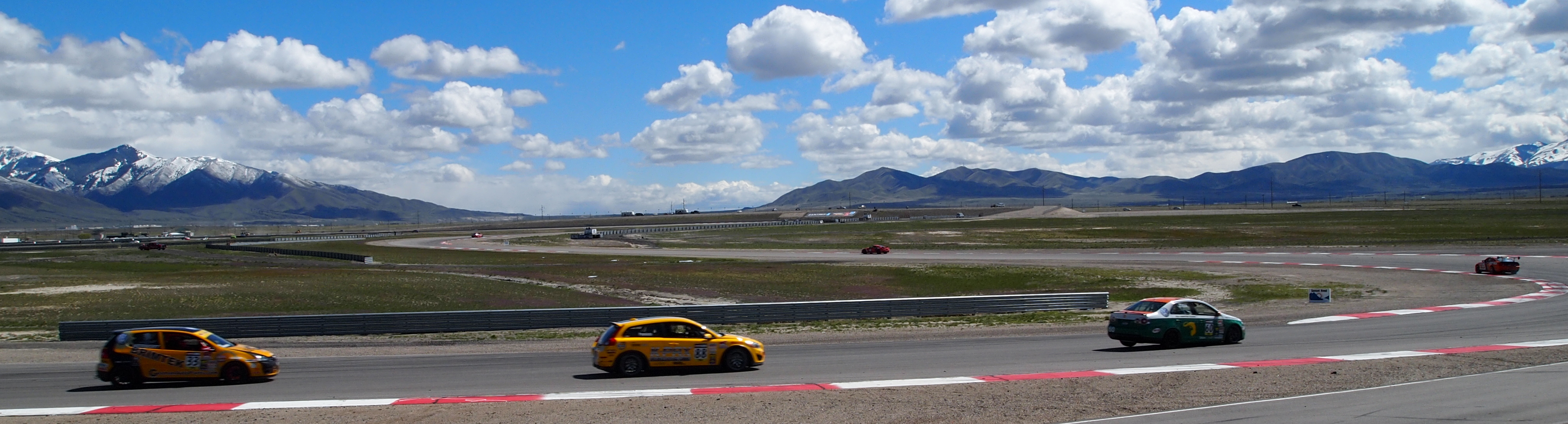
2011 GTS and Touring cars brake after first straight, Miller Motorsports Park

The championship is divided into three primary classes (Pro, Pro Am, Am) based on the official FIA driver ratings (Platinum, Gold, Silver, and Bronze) with each class scoring points towards an individual class title allowing professionals and amateurs to compete together fairly.

Since the 2026 season, the calendar consists of seven three-hour endurance races. Each weekend consists of three 60-minute free practice sessions and a 15-minute qualifying session through Friday and Saturday, with the races taken place on Sunday afternoons.

The Indianapolis 8 Hour was a special three-driver endurance race held from 2020 to 2026 alongside alongside the Intercontinental GT Challenge). Qualifying consists of three sessions instead of a single one. On the first two editions, the GTWCA awarded points after the three-hour mark rather than at the race finish. The event will be replaced by the Texas 8 Hour for 2027.

== Classes ==
The FIA Group GT3 class was included for the 2013 season. It is the single class of the GT World Challenge America since 2019, as the other classes moved to standalone championships.

=== GT ===
The GT class permitted coupe, sedan and convertible body styles developed by manufacturers and privateers. They were typically sold in the market as "sports" cars, "sport-touring" cars, or performance versions of "luxury" cars. Forced induction was permitted on cars that come equipped with forced induction stock, or on cars that the series determined need help reaching the target horsepower range. Power output ranged from 500 hp to 600 hp. Weight varied depending on power output and tire size. All of the vehicles in GT were rear-wheel drive or all-wheel drive.

=== GTA ===
A "GTA" ("GT Amateur") driver class debuted in 2014. It was a designation to recognize gentlemen drivers that competed in the GT class.

=== GT Cup ===
This spec class debuted in 2015 featuring Porsche 991 Cup Cars that ran as part of the overall GT Class races, with a separate victory circle presentation alongside that of the GT/GT-A class winners. In 2017 the class was expanded to include Lamborghini Huracan Super Trofeo and Ferrari 488 Challenge cars.

=== SRO GT4 ===
Prior to becoming a standalone championship within SRO America in 2019, SRO GT4 competed as GTS along side Group GT3 in a sprint multi class format.

=== TCR Touring Car (TCR) ===
The TCR class is based on the international TCR Touring Car class employed by a multitude of series worldwide. All TCR cars are based on 4 or 5 door production vehicles, and are powered by 2.0 litre turbocharged engines. While the bodyshell and suspension layout of the production vehicle is retained in a TCR car, and many models use a production gearbox, certain accommodations are made for the stresses of the racetrack including upgraded brakes and aerodynamics. Competition vehicles are subject to Balance of Performance (or BoP) adjustments to ensure close racing between different vehicles.

=== Touring Car B-Spec ===
Based on the Sports Car Club of America class of the same name, these were smaller cars with small, efficient, naturally aspirated motors (target HP is 125). Modifications were limited to manufacturer specified performance spring and shocks to keep overall cost down. Cars competing in TCB were prepared to the SCCA Club Racing B Spec rules. Cars that were eligible included the Fiat 500, Ford Fiesta, Mazda 2, Mini Cooper, Chevrolet Sonic, Honda Fit, Kia Rio, and Nissan Versa. The class was discontinued after the 2017 season, a year after sanctioning of the series changed from SCCA to USAC. These cars are still eligible to participate in the SCCA Runoffs.

== Circuits ==
Races part of SRO America's series as of the 2025 season. Green dots are venues hosting all four categories of GT World Challenge: GT4 America, TC America and GT America, yellow dots are venues hosting GT America only. Indianapolis is an eight-hour GT endurance contest as part of the Intercontinental GT Challenge.

== Television ==
Speed TV network televised the World Challenge starting in 1996, with the series being called the SPEED World Challenge until 2010.

Near the end of the broadcast partnership with SPEED, the World Challenge had been broadcast on weekdays as opposed to the traditional weekends. For 2009, the races were combined into an hour-long block.

On January 4, 2010, Versus (now NBC Sports Network) announced they would televise 90-minute broadcasts beginning in the 2010 season. Each broadcast featured all the races from each round. The entire 2010 season was shown on the channel. The series later returned to weekend telecasts.

Starting in 2015, CBS Sports Network announced that it acquired television rights to the series. Torque.TV, later Motor Trend On Demand partnered with CBS Sports Network for the race broadcasts to stream all races live on their website as well as on World-ChallengeTV.com. CBS Sports Network will have at least 1 race with live television coverage with Detroit being the first round announced to have live coverage.

The series has also established a section on its official site where fans can watch archived race and in-car video, as well as an increasing amount of archived television broadcasts of events prior to the 2016 season. The website currently has coverage from as far back as 2008.

== Tires ==
On October 4, 2010, the series announced that Pirelli would replace longtime partner Toyo Tires as the exclusive tire supplier for the series. For the first time in series history, teams competed on racing slicks (Pirelli P Zero) rather than the DOT competition tires in use for much of its history. In January 2014, Pirelli Tire North America and WC Vision extended the partnership for an additional five years. The extension of the partnership between the tire brand and the top production car-based racing series will run through the 2018 season.

== Champions ==
=== Drivers' ===
Season	GT Champion	Car	TC Champion	Car
SCCA / Escort Endurance Championship
1986	Paul McIntosh (GT); Bobby Archer & Tommy Archer (SS)	Porsche 944; Chevrolet Corvette	Garth Ullom & Tim Evans (SSA); Scott Gaylord & Lance Stewart (SSB)	Dodge Shelby Charger; Honda CRX
1987	Steve Saleen & Rick Titus (GT); Bobby Archer & Tommy Archer (SS)	Saleen Mustang; Chevrolet Corvette	Ray Kong & Mike Rutherford (SSA); Alistair Oag & Peter Schwartzott (SSB)	Mitsubishi Starion; Volkswagen GTI
1988	Stuart Hayner	Chevrolet Camaro	Pepe Pombo (SSA); Peter Cunningham (SSB)	Nissan 300ZX; Honda CRX
1989	Don Knowles & John Heinricy	Chevrolet Camaro	Bobby Archer & Tommy Archer (SSA); Peter Cunningham & Scott Gaylord (SSB)	Eagle Talon; Honda CRX
SCCA World Challenge
1990	R. K. Smith	Chevrolet Corvette	Bobby Archer	Eagle Talon
1991	Lou Gigliotti (SS); Shawn Hendricks (World Challenge)	Chevrolet Camaro; Chevrolet Corvette	Mitch Wright	Eagle Talon
1992	R. K. Smith (Class A); Lou Gigliotti (Class B)	Chevrolet Corvette; Chevrolet Camaro	Dave Jolly	Oldsmobile Achieva
1993	Elliott Forbes-Robinson (Class A); Willy Lewis (Class B)	Nissan 300ZX; Eagle Talon	Ron Emmick	Oldsmobile Achieva
1994	Price Cobb (World Challenge); Neil Hannemann (Touring Car)	Porsche 911; Eagle Talon	Dave Jolly	Oldsmobile Achieva
1995	David Murry (Sports); Neil Hannemann (Touring)	Porsche 911; Eagle Talon	Peter Cunningham	Honda Prelude
1996	Martin Snow (S1); Almo Coppelli (S2); Lou Gigliotti (T1)	Porsche 911; Callaway Corvette; Saleen Mustang	Michael Galati	Honda Prelude
1997	Peter Cunningham	Acura NSX	Pierre Kleinubing	Acura Integra
1998	Terry Borcheller	Saleen Mustang	Michael Galati	Acura Integra
1999	Bobby Archer	Dodge Viper	Michael Galati	Acura Integra
2000	Jeff McMillin	BMW M3	Pierre Kleinubing	Acura Integra
2001	Michael Galati	Audi S4	Pierre Kleinubing	Acura Integra
2002	Michael Galati	Audi S4	Peter Cunningham	Acura Integra
2003	Randy Pobst	Audi RS6	Bill Auberlen	BMW 325i
2004	Tommy Archer	Dodge Viper	Bill Auberlen	BMW 325i
2005	Andy Pilgrim	Cadillac CTS-V Sedan	Peter Cunningham	Acura TSX
2006	Lawson Aschenbach	Porsche 911 GT3	Pierre Kleinubing	Acura TSX
2007	Randy Pobst	Porsche 911 GT3	Jeff Altenburg	Mazda 6
2008	Randy Pobst	Porsche 911 GT3	Peter Cunningham	Acura TSX
2009	Brandon Davis	Ford Mustang GT	Pierre Kleinubing	Acura TSX
2010	Randy Pobst (GT); Peter Cunningham (GTS)	Volvo S60; Acura TSX	Robert Stout	Scion tC
2011	Patrick Long (GT); Paul Brown (GTS)	Porsche 911 GT3; Ford Mustang Boss	Lawson Aschenbach	Honda Civic
2012	Johnny O'Connell (GT); Peter Cunningham (GTS)	Cadillac CTS-V; Acura TSX	Michael Cooper (TC); Jonathan Start (TCB)	Mazda3; Fiat 500
2013	Johnny O'Connell (GT) (2); Lawson Aschenbach (GTS)	Cadillac CTS-V; Chevrolet Camaro	Ryan Winchester (TC); Robbie Davis (TCB)	Honda Civic; MINI Cooper
2014	Johnny O'Connell (GT); Michael Mills (GTA); Lawson Aschenbach (GTS)	Cadillac CTS-V; Porsche GT3R; Chevrolet Camaro	Michael DiMeo (TC); Jason Wolfe (TCA); Brian Price (TCB)	Honda Civic; Kia Forte Koup; Honda Fit
2015	Johnny O'Connell (GT); Frankie Montecalvo (GTA); Colin Thompson (GTC)	Cadillac ATS-V; Mercedes SLS; Porsche 911	Michael Cooper (GTS); Corey Fergus (TC); Jason Wolfe (TCA); Johan Schwartz (TCB)	Ford Mustang; Porsche Cayman; Honda Civic; Chevrolet Sonic
2016	Álvaro Parente (GT); Martin Fuentes (GTA); Alec Udell (GTC); Brett Sandberg (GTS)	McLaren 650S GT3; Ferrari 458 Italia GT3; Porsche 911 GT3 Cup; KTM X-Bow GT4	Toby Grahovec (TC); Elivan Goulart (TCA); Tom O'Gorman (TCB)	BMW M235i Racing; Mazda MX-5 Cup; Honda Fit
2017	Patrick Long (GT); James Sofronas (GTA); Yuki Harata (GTC); Lawson Aschenbach (GTS); George Kurtz (GTSA)	Porsche 911 GT3 R Porsche 911 GT3 R Lamborghini Huracán LP 620-2 Super Trofeo; Chevrolet Camaro GT4.R; McLaren 570S GT4	Paul Holton (TC); Matt Fassnacht (TCA); P.J. Groenke (TCB)	Audi RS 3 LMS; Mazda MX-5 Cup; Chevrolet Sonic
2018	Toni Vilander (GT); Martin Fuentes (GTA); James Sofronas (GTS); Drew Staveley (GTSA)	Ferrari 488 GT3; Ferrari 488 GT3; Audi R8 LMS GT4; Ginetta G55 GT4	Ryan Eversley (TCR/TCA); Vesko Kozarov (TC)	Honda Civic Type R TCR (FK8); Nissan 370Z
GT World Challenge America
2019	Overall	Pro-Am	Am	
2019	(Finland) Toni Vilander	(Canada) Martin Barkey (Canada) Kyle Marcelli	(Mexico) Martin Fuentes	
2020	Silver	Pro-Am	Am	
2020	(United States) Shelby Blackstock (United States) Trent Hindman	(Mexico) Martin Fuentes	(United States) Fred Poordad (United States) Max Root	
2021	Pro	Pro-Am	Am	
2021	(Italy) Andrea Caldarelli (South Africa) Jordan Pepper	(Belgium) Jan Heylen (United States) Fred Poordad	(United States) Conrad Grunewald (United States) Jean-Claude Saada	
2022	(Italy) Andrea Caldarelli	(Germany) Mario Farnbacher (United States) Ashton Harrison	(United States) Charlie Scardina (United States) Onofrio Triarsi	
2023	(United Kingdom) Stevan McAleer (United States) Eric Filgueiras	(United States) Colin Braun (United States) George Kurtz	(United States) Anthony Bartone (United Kingdom) Andy Pilgrim	
2024	(United States) Elliott Skeer (United States) Adam Adelson	(United States) Robby Foley (United States) Justin Rothberg	(United States) Jay Schreibman (Brazil) Oswaldo Negri Jr.	
2025	(United States) Connor De Phillippi (United States) Kenton Koch	(United States) Robby Foley (United States) Justin Rothberg	(United States) Jay Schreibman (Brazil) Oswaldo Negri Jr.	
2026	(United States) Robby Foley (United States) Justin Rothberg	(United States) Kyle Washington	(United States) Jay Schreibman	

- From 1986 to 1989 the series consisted of endurance races where co-drivers were used, often resulting in co-champions.
- From 1986 to 1996 a variety of prior classification systems were used. Class winners are placed under the heading (GT or TC) of the most similar modern class.

=== Manufacturers' ===
Season	GT/GT3 Champion	GTS/GT4 Champion	TCR Champion	TC Champion	TCA Champion	TCB Champion
1999	(Germany) Porsche			(Japan) Acura		
2000	(Germany) Porsche			(Japan) Acura		
2001	(Germany) Audi			(Germany) BMW		
2002	(Germany) Porsche			(Japan) Acura		
2003	(Germany) Audi			(Germany) BMW		
2004	(Germany) Audi			(Germany) BMW		
2005	(United States) Cadillac			(Japan) Acura		
2006	(Germany) Porsche			(Japan) Acura		
2007	(United States) Cadillac			(Japan) Mazda		
2008	(Germany) Porsche			(Japan) Acura		
2009	(Germany) Porsche			(Japan) Acura		
2010	(Sweden) Volvo	(Japan) Acura		(Japan) Scion		
2011	(Germany) Porsche	(United States) Ford		(Japan) Honda		
2012	(United States) Cadillac	(Japan) Acura		(Japan) Honda		(Japan) Honda
2013	(United States) Cadillac	(United States) Chevrolet		(Japan) Honda		
2014	(United States) Cadillac	(South Korea) Kia		(Japan) Honda	(South Korea) Kia	(Japan) Honda
2015	(Germany) Porsche	(United States) Ford		(Japan) Mazda	(Japan) Honda	
2016	(United Kingdom) McLaren	(United States) Ford		(Japan) Mazda	(Japan) Mazda	
2017	(Germany) Porsche	(United States) Chevrolet		(Germany) BMW	(Japan) Mazda	
2018	(Italy) Ferrari		(South Korea) Hyundai	(Japan) Nissan	(Japan) Honda	
2019	(United Kingdom) Bentley					
2020	(Japan) Acura					
2021	(Italy) Lamborghini					
2022	(Italy) Lamborghini					
2023	(Germany) Porsche					
2024	(Germany) Porsche					
2025	(Germany) BMW					
2026	(Germany) Porsche					

=== Teams' ===
Season	Overall	Pro-Am	Am
2019	(United States) K-PAX Racing	(United States) RealTime Racing	(Italy) Squadra Corse
Season	Silver	Pro-Am	Am
2020	(United States) Racers Edge Motorsports	(Italy) Squadra Corse	(United States) Wright Motorsports
Season	Pro	Pro-Am	Am
2021	(United States) K-PAX Racing	(United States) Wright Motorsports	(Italy) AF Corse
2022	(United States) K-PAX Racing	(United States) Racers Edge Motorsports	(United States) Triarsi Competizione
2023	(United States) RS1	(United States) CrowdStrike by Riley	(United States) RealTime Racing
2024	(United States) Wright Motorsports	(United States) Turner Motorsport	(Italy) AF Corse
2025	(United States) Random Vandals Racing	(United States) Turner Motorsport	(Italy) AF Corse USA
2026	(United States) Turner Motorsport	(United States) GMG Racing	(Italy) AF Corse USA

== See also ==
- Intercontinental GT Challenge
- GT Word Challenge Australia
- GT World Challenge Asia
- GT World Challenge Europe
- GT America Series
- GT4 America
- McLaren Trophy America
- Toyota GR Cup North America
- TC America
