= American Stock Car Challenge =

Racing series

American Stock Car Racing (ASC Racing) provides a venue for late model stock cars similar to those used in NASCAR, Southwest Tour, Grand National, ASA and other series to compete on road courses in the United States. The series was designed to bring the speed and passion of stock car racing to a level where drivers and teams without large budgets can afford to field competitive cars.

ASC Racing includes a "spec" class (ASC) which requires that competitors use the GM 350 ZZ4, GM 350 ZZ4 Fast Burn, Ford 351 Windsor or the Dodge 360 Magnum, Goodyear D2602 10" slicks, sealed shocks, and other items to keep the field even in terms of car performance and costs.

For those who just want to join ASC Racing with their current stock cars without modifying them to meet the "spec" requirements, ASC Racing also offers the ASC Unlimited Class (ASC-U). ASC-U is open to any stock car from any series that wants to join other stock car racers at any event.

== History ==
Originally influenced by GT America in 1995, the National Auto Sport Association (NASA) was looking for an affordable Big Bore V8 powered race car to promote grass roots road racing. The Originators were; Jerry Kunzman Founder of NASA, Miguel Caparros Director of Marketing for NASA, Doug Davis NASCAR SCCA racer and creator of NASA Touring Car Series and Scot Busby NASCAR driver and stock car builder.

== Prototype ==
After the specifications had been set, at the last moment It was decided to build a truck in order not to encroach on the then new GT America cars that were also based in Northern California. Rich and Betty Rogers stepped up to the plate and financed the prototype Chevy Silverado Pick up Finished in NAPA auto parts livery.

== Development ==
The chassis was based on a 1979 Grand Prix and maintained the original brakes and suspension control arms in an effort to keep cost down. At 2,600 lbs and over 400 horse power on hand it should be fast. First time out was at the demanding Sear Point Raceway (Infenion). Test Drivers were Brandon Kraus and Miguel Caparros. It was fast with predictable handling, in short time both drivers were setting fast laps for the day. The Young Mr Kraus got to test his abilities and brute strength when the engine pulley came off and the vehicle lost the power steering in the middle of the infamous Turn 2. Kraus was able to spin and avoid contact and brought the truck in for the day. It was a good day all in all. Next test was 3 weeks later at Laguna Seca. The high speeds attainable at Laguna Seca, played into the strengths of the truck. The Truck was the fastest car on the track. It was decided at the last minute to enter the 3 hour enduro that afternoon. Starting from the last position, Brandon Kraus was at the lead by the end of the first lap. Pulling away to a two lap lead after the first hour. At the first pit stop the lead was given back as the crew was not prepared for fast refueling and the drivers change in a race truck is rather tedious. Rich Rogers took off and drove at a more conservative pace and lost two laps to the leading BMW M3's. The second pit stop and driver change went better and only one additional laps. Now down 3 laps former Trans Am driver Lou Lerner took off matching earlier lap times. On the last lap, Lou passed the lead BMW for the lead having made up all the lost laps. At Laguna's turn 11 with the checker in sight, leading by 100 yards, the heat and exhaustion caused Lou to go into the turn too fast and spun into the sand trap.

== Champions ==
Year	Champion	Vehicle
2004	Scott Ivie	Chevrolet Monte Carlo
2005	Scott Ivie	Chevrolet Monte Carlo
2006	Ken Stinnett	Dodge Charger

Year	ASC Champion	Vehicle	ASC Unlimited Champion	Vehicle
2007	Jeff Glowniak	Chevrolet Monte Carlo	Manuel Gil del Real	Ford Taurus
2008	Bryan Hintz	Chevrolet Monte Carlo	Manuel Gil del Real	Ford Taurus
2009	Bryan Hintz	Chevrolet Monte Carlo	Manuel Gil del Real	Ford Taurus
2010	?	?	?	?
2011	Ed Charnock	Super Truck	Manuel Gil del Real	Ford Taurus
