= Spec Focus =

Spec Focus (SF) is a class of racing car used in National Auto Sport Association (NASA). The SF class focuses on the popular Ford Focus. SF is geared toward budget-minded enthusiasts looking for an affordable and fun class with rules that guarantee close competition on a reasonable budget with cars built in this century. SF allows owners of a Ford Focus to go racing by simply adding an easily available assortment of bolt-on parts and safety equipment and is a perfect starting point for aspiring new drivers to get into racing. The normal cost for a Spec Focus is $8,000 to $10,000.

Spec Focus races are run at all NASA regional events, as well as the annual National Championships held each year at the Mid-Ohio Sports Car Course.

Spec Focus Logo

== Cars ==
- 2000-2008 Ford Focus ZX3, ZX5, ZX4, ZTS, SVT, Coupes and Sedans
- 2.0L Zetec, 2.0 SVT, 2.0L Duratec, 2.3L Duratec
- 160+ WHP
- Ford Racing Dynamic Dampers
- Ford Racing Spec Focus Springs
- Performance Sway Bars
- Ford MTX-75 transmission
- Ford Racing SVT Brakes
- OEM, SVT, RS Type Kits
- SVT or RS Type Spoilers Allowed
- 17 x 7 Ford Racing Wheels
- Toyo Proxes R888 215/45 x 17
- Estimated cost $7,000 to $9,000

== Class rules ==
This section is not an exhaustive set of rules; it is intended to give the reader an idea of the preparation level of the cars in this class.

Spec Focus use specific Multimatic Inverted Dynamic dampers with Multimatic springs and adjustable front and rear sway bars, SVT Brake kit. Toyo Tires are specified for the Spec Focus Series. The tire are 215/45x17 Toyo R888 Race tires that will fit on a Ford Racing Performance Parts 17x7 wheel.

Cars with 2.0 liter engines have a minimal weight of 2600 pounds and cars with a 2.3 liter Duratec engines have a minimum race weight of 2675 pounds.

The full rules for the class may be found in the current Spec Focus Category Specifications of the NASA rule book.

== Series Officials ==
National Series Director - West: Ted Severns

National Series Director - East: Leo Capaldi

== National Champions ==
2006 Brett Mars, Ohio/Indiana Region

2007 Craig Capaldi, Ohio/Indiana Region

2008 Craig Capaldi, Ohio/Indiana Region

== Track Records ==
Autobahn County Club: Chris Kisner - 2.0L SVT ZX3 1:47.276

Buttonwillow Raceway Park 13CW: Ryan Lapp - 2.0L Zetec ZX3 2:11.219

Buttonwillow Raceway Park 13CCW: Ryan Lapp - 2.0L Zetec ZX3 2:10.842

California Speedway: Preston Lerner - 2.3L Duratec ZX4 ST 2:02.683

Gateway International Raceway: Thomas Gage - 2.0L SVT 1:14.799

Mid-Ohio (Club Course): Brett Mars - 2.3L Duratec ZX4 ST 1:48.100

Mid-Ohio (Pro Course): Craig Capaldi - 2.3L Duratec ZX5 1:45.495

Phoenix Intl Raceway: Tom Wilson - 2.0L Zetec ZX3 1:15.323

Grattan Raceway: Leo Capaldi - 2.0L Duratec ZX5 1:33.157

Summit Point (full): Matt Marks - 2.3L Duratec ZX4 ST 1:33.417

Virginia International Raceway: Matt Marks - 2.3L Duratec ZX4 ST 2:26.943

Virginia International Raceway (North): Matt Marks - 2.3L Duratec ZX4 ST 1:52.774

Willow Springs Raceway: Ryan Lapp - 2.0L Zetec ZX3 1:38.965
