= Charge of the Headlight Brigade =

American motor endurance race

The Charge of the Headlight Brigade was a 13-hour endurance race for sports cars and sedans hosted by the North Carolina Region of the Sports Car Club of America (SCCA). The event was held at Virginia International Raceway in Danville, Virginia, beginning in 2003. The name is a reference to the Charge of the Light Brigade, an 1854 battle memorialized in a famous poem by Alfred Tennyson.
