= Improved Touring =

Improved Touring is a category of classifications for cars in amateur road racing defined by the Sports Car Club of America. The class is used by other sanctioning bodies with compatible rules, such as the International Conference of Sports Car Clubs.

The classifications within the Improved Touring group define cars that will run together competitively in a road race. While cars in different classifications may be on the track simultaneously, the only positioning that matters is between cars of the same classification.

The rules for the class include the General Competition Rules (GCR), a section of the SCCA rulebook that defines the basic setup and preparation for cars in any class of SCCA racing. Improved Touring cars are also subject to the rules in the Improved Touring Category Section (ITCS) of the rulebook, which define the specific classes and provide the class-specific rules.

== GCR Rules ==
The rules from the GCR applying to Improved Touring cars mostly involve safety and basic setup. The GCR specifies the construction, fabrication, and material used in installing a roll-cage, for example. It also explains the rules of the road during racing events, including the flags and right of way rules for passing maneuvers.

Improved Touring is intended to provide a low barrier to entry by using a set of rules which limit modification of the cars while keeping the cars safe for competition. To this end, the cars are production-based models built after 1964 with a reasonable amount of limited modifications. The cars are run as-built by the manufacturer, except for modifications specifically allowed by the GCR or the ITCS.

The Improved Touring category is broken into five classes based on the performance potential of the car. Those classes are Improved Touring A (ITA), Improved Touring B (ITB), Improved Touring C (ITC), Improved Touring S (ITS) and Improved Touring R (ITR).

These basic rules make Improved Touring a popular class, since familiar and modern cars race together in groups which maximize the chances for a close finish.

== Rules ==
This section is not an exhaustive set of rules; it is intended to give the reader an idea of the preparation level of the cars in this class.

The ITCS specifies that cars may remove almost all of their interior components, as a safe race car has few flammable features inside and drivers do not want to worry about projectiles from inside their own cars during a race.

For most cars, air induction to the point where the air meets either the carburetor or mass air flow sensor is unrestricted by the rules, so cars may be prepared with improved air intakes. Exhaust systems are also unrestricted, so exhaust systems including headers may be modified. Cars may have to remain under a maximum noise level, so mufflers might still be needed.

Stock brake calipers and rotors must be used, but pad material is unrestricted.

No internal engine modifications are allowed short of rebuilding to factory "blue print" specifications, though the car's ECU may be modified or replaced with an aftermarket unit.

"Bolt-on" suspension modifications are allowed, including most coil-over shock–strut systems. Relocation, reinforcement, or custom fabrication of mounting points is not allowed.

DOT-approved tires are required, so full race tires may not be used. There are however some very high quality "DOT" tires available that perform very well at the track but are not actually intended for street use. Lightweight racing wheels may be used, but the sizes are limited by the rules.

While the ITA, ITB, ITC, ITS and ITR classes allow different model cars in competition, the classes all use the same basic rules. The cars are grouped into the different classes based on their potential for performance. A sampling of popular cars and model years in each class includes:

- ITA: Honda CR-X (1989–1991), Mazda RX-7 (12A engine, 1979–1985), Acura Integra (1.6-liter engine, 1986–1989)
- ITB: BMW 318 (1984–1986)
- ITC: Honda CR-X (1.5-liter engine, 1984–1987)
- ITS: BMW 325 (E30 body, 1987-1991), Mazda RX-7 (13B engine, 1984-1991), Datsun 240Z (1970-1973)
- ITR: BMW 328 (E36 body, 1996-1999), Porsche Boxster (2.5-liter engine, 1997-1999), Nissan 300ZX, Acura Integra Type R, Ford Mustang (V6 or 302), Mazda RX-8, Honda S2000
- IT7: Mazda RX-7, 1979-1985 12a rotary
