= Nelson Ledges Road Course =

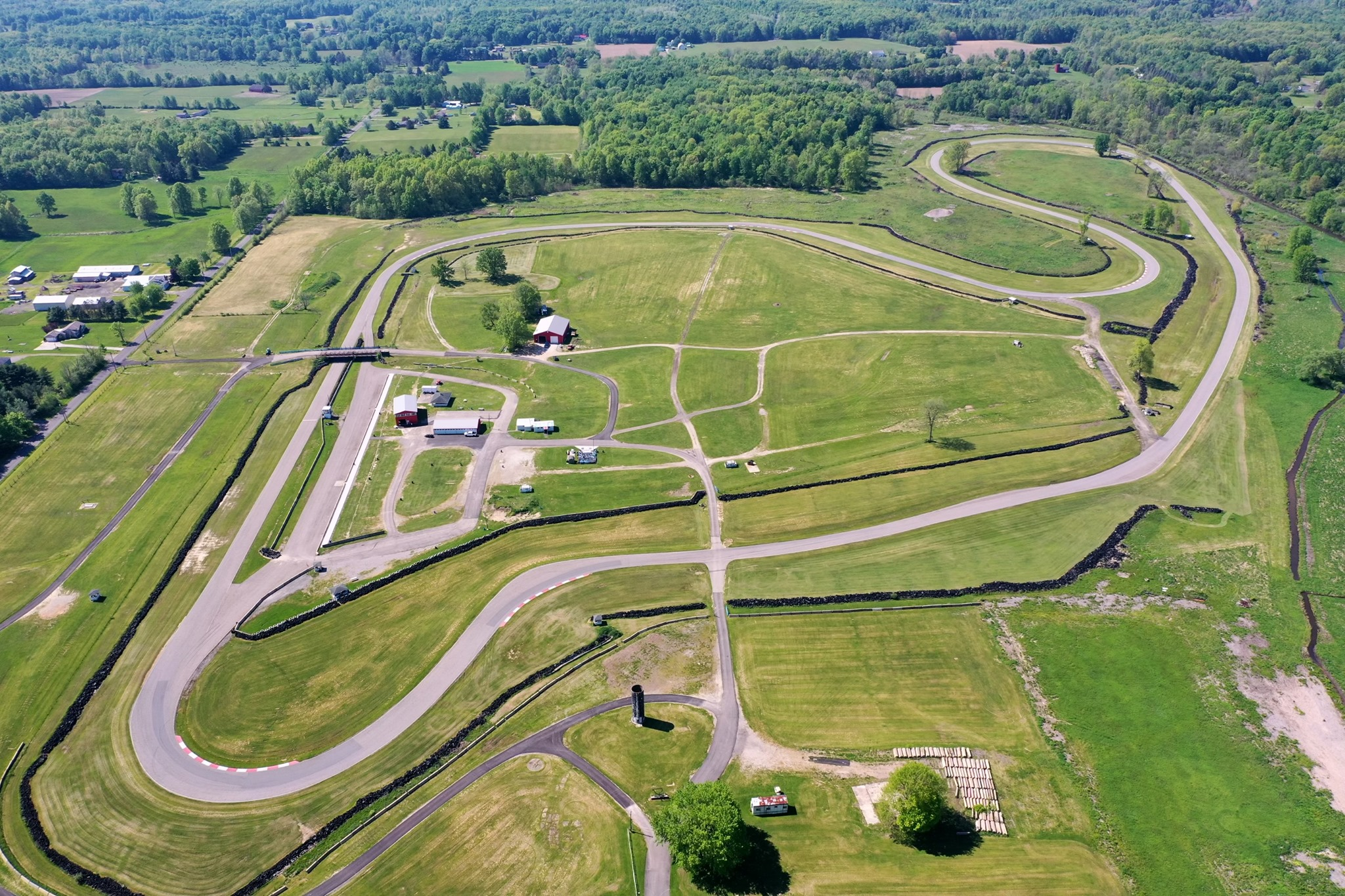
- Interactive map of Nelson Ledges Road Course
- Location: Garrettsville, Ohio, United States
- Coordinates: 41.307°N 81.015°W
- Owned by: Brian Ross Jr.
- Date opened: 1958 (dirt track), 1962 (paved track)
- Notable races: Longest Day of Nelson, 24 Hours of Nelson Ledges

Nelson Ledges Road Course is a paved automobile and motorcycle racing circuit in Garrettsville, Ohio which first opened as a dirt track in 1958. In its current form, the track is 2 miles (3 km) long and consists of seven major turns.

Under founder Marvin Drucker, Nelson Ledges Road Course became a pioneering facility in amateur racing, starting programs that quickly became standard at racetracks around the country including tire barriers, a wide use of driver schools, member days, and showroom stock endurance racing. Much of this programming was spearheaded by General Overall Director John McGill, who took over management of the track that was considered "ghost-track status" by the end of the 1960s. In 1975, the Sports Car Club of America created the John McGill Award in honor of these contributions, an award that is still given annually to recognize significant contributions to its Club Racing Program.

The track has seen major investments by its current owner, Brian Ross Jr., who purchased the track in 2015.

In addition to races, the track also holds car control and safety clinics.

== History ==
The track was constructed in 1958 on a small rural potato farm owned by attorney Marvin Drucker. After hosting dirt track races in the 1950s and early 1960s, the course was paved in 1962. At the time the track was just over 1 mile (2 km) in length.

In 1968, the track hosted its first 24 hour race, the 24 Hours of Nelson Ledges. At the time it was the only continuous 24-hour motorcycle race in the United States.

Despite this, the track was considered "ghost-track status" before its revival began in 1970 by track manager John McGill. McGill formed Mahoning Valley Motorsports to take over the track and in 1970, funded by sponsorship of the Gulf Oil company, the track's length was nearly doubled to 2 miles (3 km).

The track became the first track in the United States to be completely covered by tire walls, a safety feature which involves stacking tires outside of turns to dampen crashes. Drucker, looking to improve safety standards on the track, realized that the close proximity to Goodyear's Akron manufacturing facility meant tires were cheap and plentiful.

From 1975 to 1977, the track was a stop for the Trans-Am Series.

In 1980, the Nelson Ledges Road Course hosted the first Longest Day of Nelson, a 24-hour automobile race in which a team of two or more drivers race a showroom stock car continuously. The race essentially invented showroom stock endurance racing.

In the mid-90s, the track fell under neglect and the 24 Hours of Nelson Ledges, held continuously since 1968, was discontinued. In 1997, track manager John McGill called the surface "too trashed" to host the Longest Day of Nelson, and that too was discontinued. In the late 90s, the track lost its SCCA certification.

In 2003, track management was handed over by John McGill to his son and daughter, Scott and Kerrie Lane and numerous upgrades were done to upgrade the derelict track. In 2014 track management was replaced and events were temporarily suspended while immediate issues were addressed.

Following the death of Drucker in 2015, the track was purchased by real estate investors Brian Ross and Brian Ross Jr.

In 2018, ChampCar Endurance Series returned to Nelson Ledges for the Start of the ChampCar Summer of 24s. The track was repaved and the pit lane upgraded to handle the around the clock race.

The SCCA recertified the course in 2020 and sanctioned two races including the Nelson 24.

Plans were announced to revive the Longest Day of Nelson in 2021 as an SCCA sanctioned event, but the race was postponed to 2022.
