= GT World Challenge America (Circuit of the Americas) =

GT World Challenge America at Circuit of the Americas

GT World Challenge America
- Venue: Circuit of the Americas
- First race: 2013

The GT World Challenge America at Circuit of the Americas is an annual Sports car racing event that is held usually in the spring or in the fall. The support races are the TC America Series, GT4 America Series and the GT America Series. It is sanctioned by the United States Auto Club under the ownership of SRO Motorsports Group.

== Official names and sponsors ==
• 2013: Pirelli World Challenge at Circuit of the Americas
• 2015: Nissan Grand Prix of Texas
• 2016: Nissan Grand Prix of Texas presented by VP Racing Fuels
• 2017–2018: Grand Prix of Texas
• 2019: Blancpain GT World Challenge at Circuit of the Americas
• 2020: GT World Challenge America powered by AWS at Circuit of the Americas
• 2021–present: Fanatec GT World Challenge America Powered by AWS at Circuit of the Americas

== Winners of the GT World Challenge America at Circuit of the Americas ==
=== GT ===
Year	Circuit	GT Winning Car	GTS Winning Car	TC Winning Car	TCB Winning Car	Ref.				
Year	Circuit	GT Winning Driver	GTS Winning Driver	TC Winning Driver	TCB Winning Driver	Ref.				
2013	Circuit of the Americas	Did not participate	Did not participate	No. 72 Honda Civic Si	No. 98 Mazda 2					
2013	Circuit of the Americas	Did not participate	Did not participate	(United States) Ryan Winchester	(United States) Ernie Francis Jr.					
2013	Circuit of the Americas	No. 3 Cadillac CTS-V	No. 10 Chevrolet Camaro	No. 72 Honda Civic Si	No. 98 Mazda 2					
2013	Circuit of the Americas	(United States) Johnny O'Connell	(United States) Lawson Aschenbach	(United States) Ryan Winchester	(United States) Ernie Francis Jr.					
2013	Circuit of the Americas	No. 14 Audi R8 LMS	No. 20 Chevrolet Camaro	No. 70 Honda Civic Si	No. 98 Mazda 2					
2013	Circuit of the Americas	(United States) James Sofronas	(United States) Andy Lee	(United States) Brett Sandberg	(United States) Ernie Francis Jr.					
2014	Circuit of the Americas	No Race Held								
Year		Circuit	GT Winning Car	GTA Winning Car	GT Cup Winning Car	GTS Winning Car	TC Winning Car	TCA Winning Car	TCB Winning Car	Ref.
Year		Circuit	GT Winning Driver	GTA Winning Driver	GT Cup Winning Driver	GTS Winning Driver	TC Winning Driver	TCA Winning Driver	TCB Winning Driver	Ref.
2015	R1	Circuit of the Americas	No. 61 Ferrari 458 Italia GT3	No. 41 Porsche 911 GT3 R	No. 11 Porsche 911 GT3 Cup	No. 07 Aston Martin Vantage GT4	No. 04 Porsche Cayman	No. 86 Scion FR-S	No. 25 Chevy Sonic	
2015	R1	Circuit of the Americas	(Monaco) Olivier Beretta	(United States) Michael Lewis	(United States) Colin Thompson	(United States) Kris Wilson	(United States) Cody Ellsworth	(United States) Tony Rivera	(Denmark) Johan Schwartz	
2015	R2	Circuit of the Americas	No. 9 McLaren 650S GT3	No. 41 Porsche 911 GT3 R	No. 11 Porsche 911 GT3 Cup	No. 10 Chevrolet Camaro Z28	No. 04 Porsche Cayman	No. 86 Scion FR-S	No. 25 Chevy Sonic	
2015	R2	Circuit of the Americas	(France) Kévin Estre	(United States) Michael Lewis	(United States) Colin Thompson	(United States) Michael Cooper	(United States) Cody Ellsworth	(United States) Tony Rivera	(Denmark) Johan Schwartz	
2015	R3	Circuit of the Americas	Did not participate				No. 3 Nissan Altima	No. 36 Kia Forte Koup	No. 25 Chevy Sonic	
2015	R3	Circuit of the Americas	Did not participate				(Bulgaria) Vesko Kozarov	(United States) Jason Wolfe	(Denmark) Johan Schwartz	
Year		Circuit	GT Winning Car	GTA Winning Car	GT Cup Winning Car	GTS Winning Car	TC Winning Car	TCA Winning Car	TCB Winning Car	Ref.
Year		Circuit	GT Winning Driver	GTA Winning Driver	GT Cup Winning Driver	GTS Winning Driver	TC Winning Driver	TCA Winning Driver	TCB Winning Driver	Ref.
2016	R1	Circuit of the Americas	No. 31 Porsche 911 GT3 R	No. 07 Ferrari 458 Italia GT3	No. 17 Porsche 911 GT3 Cup	No. 10 Chevrolet Camaro Z/28.R	No. 3 Nissan 370Z	No. 70 Mazda MX-5 Cup	No. 68 Mazda Demio	
2016	R1	Circuit of the Americas	(United States) Patrick Long	(Mexico) Martín Fuentes	(United States) Alec Udell	(United States) Lawson Aschenbach	(Bulgaria) Vesko Kozarov	(United States) Elivan Goulart	(United States) Ted Hough	
2016	R2	Circuit of the Americas	No. 3 Cadillac ATS-V.R GT3	No. 07 Ferrari 458 Italia GT3	No. 20 Porsche 911 GT3 Cup	No. 13 KTM X-Bow GT4	No. 26 BMW M235iR	No. 12 Kia Forte Koup	No. 65 Mazda Demio	
2016	R2	Circuit of the Americas	(United States) Johnny O'Connell	(Mexico) Martín Fuentes	(United States) Sloan Urry	(United States) Brett Sandberg	(United States) Toby Grahovec	(United States) Jason Wolfe	(United States) Will Rodgers	
Year		Circuit	GT Winning Car	GTA Winning Car	GT Cup Winning Car	GTS Winning Car	GTSA Winning Car	TC Winning Car	TCA Winning Car	TCB Winning Car
Year		Circuit	GT Winning Driver	GTA Winning Driver	GT Cup Winning Driver	GTS Winning Driver	GTSA Winning Driver	TC Winning Driver	TCA Winning Driver	TCB Winning Driver
2017	R1	Circuit of the Americas (Note: Race 2 cancelled due to a heavy rain shower. The race was replaced by a third race at Circuit of the Americas.)	Did not participate			No. 50 Panoz Avezzano GT	No. 04 McLaren 570S GT4	No. 20 BMW M235iR	No. 33 Mazda MX-5 Cup	No. 24 Chevrolet Sonic
2017	R1	Circuit of the Americas	Did not participate			(United Kingdom) Ian James	(United States) George Kurtz	(United States) Greg Liefooghe	(United States) Kenny Murillo	(United States) Canaan O'Connell
2017	R2	Circuit of the Americas	Did not participate			No. 3 Porsche Cayman; GT4 Clubsport MR	No. 04 McLaren 570S GT4	No. 91 BMW M235iR	No. 33 Mazda MX-5 Cup	No. 6 Honda Fit
2017	R2	Circuit of the Americas	Did not participate			(Brazil) Rodrigo Baptista	(United States) George Kurtz	(Canada) Nick Wittmer	(United States) Kenny Murillo	(United States) Jake Pipal
Year		Circuit	GT Winners	GTA Winners	GT Cup Winners	GTS Winners	GTSA Winners	TCR Winners	TC Winners	TCA Winners
2018	R1	Circuit of the Americas	did not participate					(United States) No. 98 Bryan Herta Autosport with Curb-Agajanian	(United States) No. 3 Rearden Racing	(United States) No. 95 TechSport Racing
2018	R1	Circuit of the Americas	did not participate					(United States) Michael Lewis	(United States) Vesko Kozarov	(United States) Eric Powell
2018	R2	Circuit of the Americas	did not participate					(United States) No. 99 Bryan Herta Autosport with Curb-Agajanian	(United States) No. 3 Rearden Racing	(United States) No. 94 TOMO Racing
2018	R2	Circuit of the Americas	did not participate					(Canada) Mark Wilkins	(United States) Vesko Kozarov	(United States) Tom O'Gorman
Year		Circuit	Pole position	Pro winners	Pro-Am winners	Am winners	Ref.			
2019	R1	Circuit of the Americas	(United States) No. 9 K-PAX Racing	**(United States) No. 3 K-PAX Racing**	(United States) No. 31 TR3 Racing	(United States) No. 7 Squadra Corse				
2019	R1	Circuit of the Americas	(Portugal) Álvaro Parente (Spain) Andy Soucek	**(Brazil) Rodrigo Baptista** **(Belgium) Maxime Soulet**	(Canada) Wei Lu (United States) Jeff Segal	(United States) Caesar Bacarella (Mexico) Martin Fuentes				
2019	R2	Circuit of the Americas	(United States) No. 80 Racers Edge Motorsports	**(Canada) No. 61 R. Ferri Motorsport**	(United States) No. 80 Racers Edge Motorsports	(United States) No. 7 Squadra Corse				
2019	R2	Circuit of the Americas	(Canada) Martin Barkey (Canada) Kyle Marcelli	**(Spain) Miguel Molina** **(Finland) Toni Vilander**	(Canada) Martin Barkey (Canada) Kyle Marcelli	(United States) Caesar Bacarella (Mexico) Martin Fuentes				
Year		Circuit	Pole position	Pro winners	Pro-Am winners	Am winners	Ref.			
2020	R1	Circuit of the Americas	(United States) No. 14 GMG Racing	**(United States) No. 93 Racers Edge Motorsports**	(United States) No. 14 GMG Racing	(United States) No. 20 Wright Motorsports				
2020	R1	Circuit of the Americas	(Netherlands) Jeroen Bleekemolen (United States) James Sofronas	**(United States) Shelby Blackstock** **(United States) Trent Hindman**	(Netherlands) Jeroen Bleekemolen (United States) James Sofronas	(United States) Fred Poordad (United States) Max Root				
2020	R2	Circuit of the Americas	(United States) No. 93 Racers Edge Motorsports	**(United States) No. 93 Racers Edge Motorsports**	(Italy) No. 1 Squadra Corse	(United States) No. 20 Wright Motorsports				
2020	R2	Circuit of the Americas	(United States) Shelby Blackstock (United States) Trent Hindman	**(United States) Shelby Blackstock** **(United States) Trent Hindman**	(Brazil) Rodrigo Baptista (Mexico) Martin Fuentes	(United States) Fred Poordad (United States) Max Root				
Year		Circuit	Pole position	Silver winners	Pro/Am winners	Am winners	Ref.			
2020	R1	Circuit of the Americas	(Italy) No. 1 Squadra Corse	(United States) No. 93 Racers Edge Motorsports	**(Italy) No. 1 Squadra Corse**	No Entries				
2020	R1	Circuit of the Americas	(Brazil) Rodrigo Baptista (Mexico) Martin Fuentes	(United States) Shelby Blackstock (United States) Trent Hindman	**(Brazil) Rodrigo Baptista** **(Mexico) Martin Fuentes**	No Entries				
2020	R2	Circuit of the Americas	(Italy) No. 1 Squadra Corse	(United States) No. 93 Racers Edge Motorsports	**(Italy) No. 1 Squadra Corse**	No Entries				
2020	R2	Circuit of the Americas	(Brazil) Rodrigo Baptista (Mexico) Martin Fuentes	(United States) Shelby Blackstock (United States) Trent Hindman	**(Brazil) Rodrigo Baptista** **(Mexico) Martin Fuentes**	No Entries				
Year		Circuit	Pole position	Pro winners	Silver winners	Pro/Am winners	Am winners	Ref.		
2021	R1	Circuit of the Americas	(United States) No. 3 K-Pax Racing	**(United States) No. 3 K-Pax Racing**	No Entries	(United Kingdom) No. 70 Inception Racing	(Italy) No. 61 AF Corse			
2021	R1	Circuit of the Americas	(Italy) Andrea Caldarelli (South Africa) Jordan Pepper	**(Italy) Andrea Caldarelli** **(South Africa) Jordan Pepper**	No Entries	(United States) Brendan Iribe (United Kingdom) Ollie Millroy	(United States) Conrad Grunewald (United States) Jean-Claude Saada			
2021	R2	Circuit of the Americas	(United States) No. 33 Winward Racing	**(United States) No. 6 K-Pax Racing**	No Entries	(United States) No. 04 DXDT Racing	(Italy) No. 61 AF Corse			
2021	R2	Circuit of the Americas	(United Kingdom) Philip Ellis (United States) Russell Ward	(United States) Corey Lewis (Italy) Giovanni Venturini	No Entries	(United States) Colin Braun (United States) George Kurtz	(United States) Conrad Grunewald (United States) Jean-Claude Saada			
2022	No Round	Circuit of the Americas	No Race Held							
Year		Circuit	Pole position	IGTC Pro Winners	Pro Winners	Pro/Am winners	Am winners	Ref.		
2023	R1	Circuit of the Americas	(United States) No. 28 RennSport1 – CBW Racing	Did not participate	(United States) No. 28 RennSport1 – CBW Racing	**(United States) No. 120 Wright Motorsports**	(United States) No. 43 Bartone Bros Racing with RealTime			
2023	R1	Circuit of the Americas	(United States) Eric Filgueiras	Did not participate	(United States) Eric Filgueiras (United Kingdom) Stevan McAleer	**(United States) Adam Adelson** **(United States) Elliot Skeer**	(United States) Anthony Bartone (United Kingdom) Andy Pilgrim			
2023	R2	Circuit of the Americas	(United States) No. 04 CrowdStrike Racing by Riley Motorsports	Did not participate	**(United States) No. 93 Racers Edge Motorsports**	(United States) No. 120 Wright Motorsports	(United States) No. 43 Bartone Bros Racing with RealTime			
2023	R2	Circuit of the Americas	(United States) Colin Braun	Did not participate	**(United States) Ashton Harrison** **(Germany) Mario Farnbacher**	(United States) Adam Adelson (United States) Elliott Skeer	(United States) Anthony Bartone (United Kingdom) Andy Pilgrim			
2024	R1	Circuit of the Americas	(Italy) No. 88 AF Corse	Did not participate	(United States) DXDT Racing	**(Canada) No. 38 ST Racing**	Did not participate			
2024	R1	Circuit of the Americas	(Italy) Riccardo Agostini (Brazil) Custodio Toledo	Did not participate	(United States) Alec Udell (United States) Tommy Milner	(Canada) Samantha Tan (United States) Neil Verhagen	Did not participate			
2024	R2	Circuit of the Americas	(Canada) No. 38 ST Racing	Did not participate	**(United States) DXDT Racing**	(Canada) No. 38 ST Racing	Did not participate			
2024	R2	Circuit of the Americas	(Canada) Samantha Tan (United States) Neil Verhagen	Did not participate	**(United States) Alec Udell** **(United States) Tommy Milner**	(Canada) Samantha Tan (United States) Neil Verhagen	Did not participate			

=== GT4/SprintX ===
Round		Circuit	Pole position	SprintX		East		West	
Round		Circuit	Pole position	Pro-Am winners	Am winners	Pro-Am winners	Am winners	Pro-Am winners	Am winners
2019	R1	Circuit of the Americas	(United States) No. 47 Nolasport	**(United States) No. 47 Nolasport**	(United States) No. 51 Team Panoz Racing	(United States) No. 77 Park Place Motorsports	(United States) No. 31 Bodymotion Racing	(Canada) No. 28 ST Racing	(United States) No. 91 Rearden Racing
2019	R1	Circuit of the Americas	(United States) Jason Hart (United States) Matt Travis	**(United States) Jason Hart** **(United States) Matt Travis**	(United States) Preston Calvert (United States) Matt Keegan	(United States) Alan Brynjolfsson (United States) Trent Hindman	(United States) Al Carter (United States) Sean Gibbons	(United States) Harry Gottsacker (United States) Jon Miller	(United States) Jeff Burton (United States) Vesko Kozarov
2019	R2	Circuit of the Americas	(United States) No. 47 Nolasport	(United States) No. 47 Nolasport	(United States) No. 36 Andretti Autosport	**(United States) No. 77 Park Place Motorsports**	(United States) No. 34 Murillo Racing	(Canada) No. 28 ST Racing	(United States) No. 67 TRG – The Racers Group
2019	R2	Circuit of the Americas	(United States) Jason Hart (United States) Matt Travis	(United States) Jason Hart (United States) Matt Travis	(United States) Jarett Andretti (Canada) Karl Thomson	**(United States) Alan Brynjolfsson** **(United States) Trent Hindman**	(United States) Matt Fassnacht (United States) Christian Szymczak	(United States) Harry Gottsacker (United States) Jon Miller	(United States) Chris Bellomo (United States) Kevin Woods
Year		Circuit	Pole position	Silver winners	Pro-Am winners	Am winners	Ref.		
2020	R1	Circuit of the Americas	(United States) No. 71 Marco Polo Motorsports	(United States) No. 36 Andretti Autosport	**(United States) No. 47 Nolasport**	(United States) No. 7 Nolasport			
2020	R1	Circuit of the Americas	(United States) Nicolai Elghanayan (Norway) Mads Siljehaug	(United States) Jarett Andretti (United States) Colin Mullan	**(United States) Jason Hart** **(United States) Matt Travis**	(United States) Zac Anderson (United States) Sean Gibbons			
2020	R2	Circuit of the Americas	(United States) No.2 GMG Racing	(Canada) No. 28 ST Racing	**(United States) No. 47 Nolasport**	(United States) No. 7 Nolasport			
2020	R2	Circuit of the Americas	(United States) Jason Bell (United States) Andrew Davis	(United States) Harry Gottsacker (Canada) Nick Wittmer	**(United States) Jason Hart** **(United States) Matt Travis**	(United States) Zac Anderson (United States) Sean Gibbons			
Year		Circuit	Pole position	Silver winners	Pro-Am winners	Am winners	Ref.		
2021	R1	Circuit of the Americas	(United States) No. 47 Nolasport	(United States) No. 94 Bimmerworld Racing	**(United States) No. 47 Nolasport**	(United States) No. 68 TGR Smooge Racing			
2021	R1	Circuit of the Americas	(United States) Jason Hart (United States) Matt Travis	(United States) Chandler Hull (United States) Jon Miller	(United States) **Jason Hart** (United States) **Matt Travis**	(United States) Kevin Conway (United States) John Geesbreght			
2021	R2	Circuit of the Americas	(United States) No. 47 Nolasport	(United States) No. 72 Murillo Racing	**(United States) No. 47 Nolasport**	(United States) No. 7 Nolasport with OGH			
2021	R2	Circuit of the Americas	(United States) Jason Hart (United States) Matt Travis	(United States) Kenny Murillo (United States) Christian Szymczak	(United States) **Jason Hart** (United States) **Matt Travis**	(United States) Sean Gibbons (United States) Sam Owen			
2022	No Round	Circuit of the Americas	No Race Held						
Year		Circuit	Pole position	Silver winners	Pro/Am winners	Am winners	Ref.		
2023	R1	Circuit of the Americas	(United States) No. 74 TGR Copeland Motorsports	**(United States) No. 51 Auto Technic Racing**	(United States) No. 68 TGR Smooge Racing	(Canada) No. 438 STR38 Motorsports			
2023	R1	Circuit of the Americas	(United States) Tyler Gonzalez (United States) Tyler Maxson	**(United States) Zac Anderson** **(United States) John Capestro-Dubets**	(United States) Kevin Conway (United States) John Geesbreght	(United States) Robert Mau (New Zealand) Chris Allen			
2023	R2	Circuit of the Americas	(United States) No. 54 Black Swan Racing	(United States) No. 999 TGR Hanley Motorsports	**(United States) No. 2 Flying Lizard Motorsports**	(United States) No. 36 Bimmerworld Racing			
2023	R2	Circuit of the Americas	(Netherlands) Jeroen Bleekemolen (United States) Tim Pappas	(United States) Daniel Hanley (Canada) Parker Thompson	**(United States) Jason Bell** **(United States) Michael Cooper**	(United Kingdom) Charlie Postins (United States) James Clay			
Year		Circuit	Pole position	SRO3 Winners	GT2 Winners	GT4 winners	Ref.		
2023	R1	Circuit of the Americas	(United States) No. 56 SKI Autosports	**(United States) No. 04 Crowdstrike Racing by Riley Motorsports**	No Entries	(United States) No. 50 Chouest Povoledo Racing			
2023	R1	Circuit of the Americas	(United States) Johnny O'Connell	**(United States) George Kurtz**	No Entries	(United States) Ross Chouest			
2023	R2	Circuit of the Americas		**(United States) No. 27 CRP Racing**	No Entries	(United States) No. 8 Flying Lizard Motorsports			
2023	R2	Circuit of the Americas		**(United States) Jason Daskalos**	No Entries	(United States) Elias Sabo			

=== Sprint ===
Round		Circuit	Pole position	Pro winners	Am winners	Ref.
2020	R1	Circuit of the Americas	(United States) No. 12 Ian Lacy Racing	(United States) No. 12 Ian Lacy Racing	(United States) No. 210 Flying Lizard Motorsports	
2020	R1	Circuit of the Americas	(United States) Drew Staveley	(United States) Drew Staveley	(United States) Michael Dinan	
2020	R2	Circuit of the Americas		(United States) No. 10 Blackdog Speed Shop	(United States) No. 59 Rearden Racing	
2020	R2	Circuit of the Americas		(United States) Michael Cooper	(United States) Paul Terry	
Year		Circuit	Pole position	Pro winners	Am winners	
2020	R1	Circuit of the Americas	(United States) No. 10 Blackdog Speed Shop	(United States) No. 10 Blackdog Speed Shop	(United States) No. 210 Flying Lizard Motorsports	
2020	R1	Circuit of the Americas	(United States) Michael Cooper	(United States) Michael Cooper	(United States) Michael Dinan	
2020	R2	Circuit of the Americas		(United States) No. 10 Blackdog Speed Shop	(United States) No. 59 Rearden Racing	
2020	R2	Circuit of the Americas		(United States) Michael Cooper	(United States) Paul Terry	
2020	R3	Circuit of the Americas		(United States) No. 10 Blackdog Speed Shop	(United States) No. 210 Flying Lizard Motorsports	
2020	R3	Circuit of the Americas		(United States) Michael Cooper	(United States) Michael Dinan	

=== TCR/TCA ===
Bold indicates overall winner.

Year		Circuit	Pole position	TCR Winners	DSG Cup Winners	TCA Winners
2019	R1	Circuit of the Americas	(United States) No. 72 FCP Euro	**(United States) No. 12 TFB**	(Canada) No. 47 Alphasonic Motorsport	(United States) No. 91 TechSport Racing
2019	R1	Circuit of the Americas	(United States) Nate Vincent	**(United States) Mason Filippi**	(Canada) Alain Lauziere	(Canada) Nick Wittmer
2019	R2	Circuit of the Americas	(United States) No. 12 TFB	**(United States) No. 12 TFB**	(Canada) No. 47 Alphasonic Motorsport	(United States) No. 91 TechSport Racing
2019	R2	Circuit of the Americas	(United States) Mason Filippi	**(United States) Mason Filippi**	(Canada) Alain Lauziere	(Canada) Nick Wittmer
Year		Circuit	TCR Winners	TCA Winners	Ref.	
2020	R1	Circuit of the Americas	**(United States) No. 74 Copeland Motorsports**	(United Kingdom) No. 61 MINI JCW Team		
2020	R1	Circuit of the Americas	**(United States) Tyler Maxson**	(United States) Mark Pombo		
2020	R2	Circuit of the Americas	**(United States) No. 74 Copeland Motorsports**	(United Kingdom) No. 60 MINI JCW Team		
2020	R2	Circuit of the Americas	**(United States) Tyler Maxson**	(United States) Tomas Mejia		
Year		Circuit	TC Winners	TCA Winners	Ref.	
2021	R1	Circuit of the Americas	(United States) **No. 78 GenRacer**	(United States) No. 18 Forbush Performance		
2021	R1	Circuit of the Americas	(United States) **Jeff Ricca**	(United States) Caleb Bacon		
2021	R2	Circuit of the Americas	(United States) No. 9 DXDT Racing	(United States) No. 18 Forbush Performance		
2021	R2	Circuit of the Americas	(United States) Kevin Boehm	(United States) Caleb Bacon		
2022	No Round	Circuit of the Americas	No Race Held			
Round		Circuit	Pole position	TCX Winners	TCA Winners	Ref.
2023	R1	Circuit of the Americas	(Puerto Rico) No. 99 VGRT	**(United States) No. 26 Rigid Speed Company**	(United States) No. 22 TechSport Racing	
2023	R1	Circuit of the Americas	(Japan) Daijiro Yoshihara	**(United States) Lucas Catania**	(United States) Devin Anderson	
2023	R2	Circuit of the Americas		**(United States) No. 44 Rooster Hall Racing**	(United States) No. 77 Skip Barber Racing School	
2023	R2	Circuit of the Americas		**(United States) Colin Garrett**	(United States) William Lambros	
2024	R1	Circuit of the Americas	(United States) #104 Carrus Callas Raceteam	**(United States) #104 Carrus Callas Raceteam**	(United States) #62 MINI JCW Team	
2024	R1	Circuit of the Americas	(United States) Chris Walsh	**(United States) Chris Walsh**	(Canada) P.J. Groenke	
2024	R2	Circuit of the Americas		**(United States) #104 Carrus Callas Raceteam**	(United States) No. 14 Skip Barber Racing School	
2024	R2	Circuit of the Americas		**(United States) Chris Walsh**	(United States) Alex Garcia	

=== TC ===
Note: TC results are cited on the TCR/TCA table.

Year		Circuit	Pole position	Winning driver	Winning team
2019	R1	Circuit of the Americas	(United States) Jeff Ricca	(Denmark) Johan Schwartz	(United States) Rooster Hall Racing
2019	R2	Circuit of the Americas	(United States) Paul Terry	(United States) Jeff Ricca	(United States) GenRacer
Year		Circuit	Winning driver	Winning team	
2020	R1	Circuit of the Americas	(United States) No. 36 BimmerWorld Racing	(United States) James Clay	
2020	R2	Circuit of the Americas	(United States) No. 23 TechSport Racing	(United States) Joseph Federl	
Year		Circuit	TC Winners		
2021	R1	Circuit of the Americas	(United States) **No. 78 GenRacer**		
2021	R1	Circuit of the Americas	(United States) **Jeff Ricca**		
2021	R2	Circuit of the Americas	(United States) No. 9 DXDT Racing		
2021	R2	Circuit of the Americas	(United States) Kevin Boehm		
2022	No Round	Circuit of the Americas	No Race Held		
Year		Circuit	TC Winners		
2023	R1	Circuit of the Americas	(United States) No. 60 MINI JCW Team		
2023	R1	Circuit of the Americas	(United States) Clayton Williams		
2023	R2	Circuit of the Americas	(United States) No. 60 MINI JCW Team		
2023	R2	Circuit of the Americas	(United States) Clayton Williams		
2024	R1	Circuit of the Americas	(United States) Ricca Autosport		
2024	R1	Circuit of the Americas	(United States) Jeff Ricca		
2024	R2	Circuit of the Americas	(United States) Ricca Autosport		
2024	R2	Circuit of the Americas	(Puerto Rico) Ruben Iglesias Jr.		

=== GT Sports Club America ===
Round		Circuit	Pole position	Overall winner	Titanium Winner	Iron Winner
2020	R1	Circuit of the Americas	(United States) No. 14 GMG Racing	(United States) No. 27 Daskalos Motorsports	**(United States) No. 14 GMG Racing**	No Entries
2020	R1	Circuit of the Americas	(United States) James Sofronas	(United States) Jason Daskalos	**(United States) James Sofronas**	No Entries
2020	R2	Circuit of the Americas	(United States) No. 27 Daskalos Motorsports	**(United States) No. 31 TR3 Racing**	No Starters	No Entries
2020	R2	Circuit of the Americas	(United States) Jason Daskalos	**(United States) Mark Issa**	No Starters	No Entries

=== TCX ===
Note: TCX results are cited on the TCR/TCA table.

Round		Circuit	Pole position	TCX Winners
2021	R1	Circuit of the Americas	(United States) No. 81 Classic BMW	(United States) No. 81 Classic BMW
2021	R1	Circuit of the Americas	(United States) Jacob Ruud	(United States) Jacob Ruud
2021	R2	Circuit of the Americas		**(United States) No. 81 Classic BMW**
2021	R2	Circuit of the Americas		**(United States) Jacob Ruud**
2022	No Round	Circuit of the Americas	No Race Held	
Year		Circuit	Pole position	TCX Winners
2023	R1	Circuit of the Americas	(Puerto Rico) No. 99 VGRT	**(United States) No. 26 Rigid Speed Company**
2023	R1	Circuit of the Americas	(Japan) Daijiro Yoshihara	**(United States) Lucas Catania**
2023	R2	Circuit of the Americas		' (United States) No. 44 Rooster Hall Racing
2023	R2	Circuit of the Americas		**(United States) Colin Garrett**
2024	R1	Circuit of the Americas	(United States) #104 Carrus Callas Raceteam	**(United States) #104 Carrus Callas Raceteam**
2024	R1	Circuit of the Americas	(United States) #62 MINI JCW Team	(United States) Chris Walsh
2024	R2	Circuit of the Americas		**(United States) #104 Carrus Callas Raceteam**
2024	R2	Circuit of the Americas		**(United States) Chris Walsh**
