= 2023 GT America Series =

Racing series

The 2023 GT America Series was the third season of the SRO Motorsports Group's GT America Series, an auto racing series for grand tourer cars. The races were contested with GT2-spec, GT3-spec and GT4-spec cars. The season began on March 5 at St. Petersburg and ended on October 9 at Indianapolis.

== Calendar ==
The preliminary calendar was released on October 17, 2022, featuring seven rounds.

Round	Circuit	Date	Supporting
1	St. Petersburg Street Circuit, St. Petersburg, Florida	March 3–5	IndyCar Series
2	Sonoma Raceway, Sonoma, California	March 30 – April 2	GT World Challenge America
3	NOLA Motorsports Park, Avondale, Louisiana	April 28–30	GT World Challenge America
4	Circuit of the Americas, Austin, Texas	May 19–21	GT World Challenge America
5	Virginia International Raceway, Alton, Virginia	June 16–18	GT World Challenge America
6	Nashville Street Circuit, Nashville, Tennessee	August 4–6	IndyCar Series
7	Road America, Elkhart Lake, Wisconsin	August 19–21	GT World Challenge America
8	Sebring International Raceway, Sebring, Florida	September 23–25	GT World Challenge America
9	Indianapolis Motor Speedway, Indianapolis, Indiana	October 7–9	GT World Challenge America

== Entry list ==
Team	Car	No.	Drivers	Class		Rounds
Team	Car	No.	Drivers	Car	Driver	Rounds
(United States) Crowdstrike Racing by Riley Motorsports	Mercedes-AMG GT3 Evo	04	(United States) George Kurtz	GT3	OV	1–5, 7–9
(United States) TRG-AMR	Aston Martin Vantage AMR GT4	009	(United States) Tim Savage	GT4	GT	2, 5, 7–9
(United States) DXDT Racing	Mercedes-AMG GT3 Evo	08	(United States) Scott Smithson	GT3	OV	1–4, 7–9
(United States) DXDT Racing	Mercedes-AMG GT3 Evo	91	(United States) Jeff Burton	GT3	OV	1–5, 7
(United States) Lone Star Racing	Mercedes-AMG GT3 Evo	011	(United States) Marc Austin	GT3	OV	2, 4, 7, 9
(United States) Lone Star Racing	Mercedes-AMG GT2	80	(United States) Dan Knox	GT2	GT	9
(United Kingdom) OnlyFans Racing With P1 Groupe By MRS	Porsche 911 GT3 R (991.2)	043	(United States) Alex Vogel	GT3	OV	1–3, 5–9
(United Kingdom) OnlyFans Racing With P1 Groupe By MRS	Porsche 911 GT3 R (991.2)	043	(United States) Peter Pejacsevich	GT3	OV	4
(United States) Archangel Motorsports	Aston Martin Vantage AMR GT4	045	(United States) Scott Blind	GT4	GT	7–9
(United States) Archangel Motorsports	Aston Martin Vantage AMR GT4	69	(United States) Todd Coleman	GT4	GT	1–4
(United States) Chicago Performance & Tuning, Co.	KTM X-Bow GT2	094	(United States) Kevin Woods	GT2	GT	9
(United States) Turner Motorsports	BMW M4 GT3	096	(United States) Vincent Barletta	GT3	OV	5
(Germany) Rotek Racing	Porsche 718 Cayman GT4 RS Clubsport	098	(United States) Chris Alliegro	GT4	GT	2, 5–6
(Germany) Rotek Racing	Porsche 718 Cayman GT4 RS Clubsport	099	(United States) Robb Holland	GT4	GT	2–9
(United States) Flying Lizard Motorsports	Aston Martin Vantage AMR GT4	2	(United States) Jason Bell	GT4	GT	All
(United States) Flying Lizard Motorsports	Aston Martin Vantage AMR GT4	8	(United States) Elias Sabo	GT4	GT	2–5, 7–9
(United States) Flying Lizard Motorsports	Porsche 911 GT3 R (991.2)	460	(United States) Andy Wilzoch	GT3	OV	All
(United States) SKI Autosports	Audi R8 LMS Ultra	3	(United States) Johnny O'Connell	GT3	OV	5–9
(United States) SKI Autosports	Ferrari 458 Italia GT3	56	(United States) Johnny O'Connell	GT3	OV	3–4
(United States) Blackdog Speed Shop	Chevrolet Camaro GT4.R	5	(United States) Tony Gaples	GT4	GT	All
(United States) Flatrock Motorsports	Porsche 718 Cayman GT4 RS Clubsport	7	(United States) Rusty Bittle	GT4	GT	6
(United States) TR3 Racing	Mercedes-AMG GT3 Evo	9	(United States) Ziad Ghandour	GT3	OV	2
(United States) TR3 Racing	Aston Martin Vantage AMR GT4	77	(United States) Jon Branam	GT4	GT	2
(United States) TR3 Racing	Aston Martin Vantage AMR GT4	77	(United States) Paul Kiebler	GT4	GT	2–5
(United States) Fast Track Racing	BMW M4 GT4	11	(United States) John Roberts	GT4	GT	4, 7
(United States) Fast Track Racing	BMW M4 GT3	11	(United States) John Roberts	GT3	OV	9
(United States) Team ACP Tangerine	BMW M4 GT4	12	(United States) Kenneth Goldberg	GT4	GT	1
(United States) Team ACP Tangerine	BMW M4 GT4	152	(United States) Steve Weber	GT4	GT	1
(United States) GMG Racing	Aston Martin Vantage AMR GT4	13	(United States) Todd Parriott	GT4	GT	7, 9
(United States) GMG Racing	Audi R8 LMS Evo II	14	(United States) James Sofronas	GT3	OV	1, 4, 7
(United States) GMG Racing	Porsche 911 GT3 R (991.2)	32	(United States) Kyle Washington	GT3	OV	2, 5, 7, 9
(United States) GMG Racing	Audi R8 LMS GT2	58	(United States) CJ Moses	GT2	GT	5, 9
(United States) GMG Racing	Porsche 718 Cayman GT4 RS Clubsport	71	(United States) Jay Logan	GT4	GT	4
(United States) TGR Carrus Callas Racing Team	Toyota GR Supra GT4	21	(United States) Nicholas Shanny	GT4	GT	All
(United States) Heart of Racing Team	Aston Martin Vantage AMR GT4	25	(United States) Gray Newell	GT4	GT	All
(United States) CRP Racing	Mercedes-AMG GT3 Evo	27	(United States) Jason Daskalos	GT3	OV	All
(United States) CRP Racing	Mercedes-AMG GT3 Evo	41	(United States) Todd Treffert	GT3	OV	2–5, 7–9
(United States) Bartone Bros Racing with RealTime	Mercedes-AMG GT3 Evo	43	(United States) Andy Pilgrim	GT3	OV	1
(United States) Bartone Bros Racing with RealTime	Mercedes-AMG GT3 Evo	427	(United States) Anthony Bartone	GT3	OV	1–5, 7–8
(United States) Chouest Povoledo Racing	Aston Martin Vantage AMR GT4	50	(United States) Ross Chouest	GT4	GT	All
(United States) Accelerating Performance	Aston Martin Vantage AMR GT4	55	Moisey Uretsky (Note: Moisey Uretsky is Russian, but he competes as a neutral competitor as Russian national emblems were banned by the FIA due to the Russian invasion of Ukraine.)	GT4	GT	1
(United States) CDR Valkyrie	Nissan GT-R Nismo GT3	66	(United States) Amir Haleem	GT3	OV	7
(United States) CDR Valkyrie	Acura NSX GT3 Evo22	86	(United States) Brian Lock	GT3	OV	7
(Germany) Mishumotors	Corvette C7 GT3-R	70	(Germany) Mirco Schultis	GT3	OV	1–3, 6–9
(United States) BGB Motorsports	Porsche 718 Cayman GT4 RS Clubsport	81	(Canada) Thomas Collingwood	GT4	GT	1, 8
(United States) RENNtech Motorsports	Mercedes-AMG GT4	89	(United States) Thomas Johnson	GT4	GT	1
(United States) Extreme Velocity Motorsports	Porsche 718 Cayman GT4 RS Clubsport	99	(United States) Matt Joffe	GT4	GT	3, 5
(United States) TKO Motorsports with Flying Lizard	Mercedes-AMG GT3 Evo	101	(Mexico) Memo Gidley	GT3	OV	All
(United States) Wright Motorsports	Porsche 911 GT3 R (991.2)	120	(United States) Adam Adelson	GT3	OV	2–5
(United States) Wright Motorsports	Porsche 911 GT3 R (992)	120	(United States) Adam Adelson	GT3	OV	7–9
(United States) Auto Technic Racing	BMW M4 GT4	253	(United States) Rob Walker	GT4	GT	2
(United States) Van der Steur Racing	Aston Martin Vantage AMR GT4	428	(United States) Brady Behrman	GT4	GT	7

Icon	Class
Car
GT2	GT2 Cars
GT3	GT3 Current-Gen Cars
GT3	GT3 Previous-Gen Cars
GT4	GT4 Cars
Drivers
OV	Overall
GT	GT2
GT	GT4
INV	Invitational

== Race results ==
Bold indicates overall winner

Round		Circuit	Pole position	SRO3 Winners	GT2 Winners	GT4 Winners
1	R1	(Florida) St. Petersburg	(United States) #08 DXDT Racing	(United States) #27 CRP Racing	No Entries	(United States) #50 Chouest Povoledo Racing
1	R1	(Florida) St. Petersburg	(United States) Scott Smithson	(United States) Jason Daskalos	No Entries	(United States) Ross Chouest
1	R2	(Florida) St. Petersburg		(United States) #101 TKO Motorsports with Flying Lizard	No Entries	(United States) #2 Flying Lizard Motorsports
1	R2	(Florida) St. Petersburg		(Mexico) Memo Gidley	No Entries	(United States) Jason Bell
2	R1	(California) Sonoma		(United States) #101 TKO Motorsports with Flying Lizard	No Entries	(Germany) #099 Rotek Racing
2	R1	(California) Sonoma		(Mexico) Memo Gidley	No Entries	(United States) Robb Holland
2	R2	(California) Sonoma		(United States) #427 Bartone Bros Racing with RealTime	No Entries	(United States) #77 TR3 Racing
2	R2	(California) Sonoma		(United States) Anthony Bartone	No Entries	(United States) Jon Branam
3	R1	(Louisiana) NOLA	(United States) #101 TKO Motorsports with Flying Lizard	(United States) #101 TKO Motorsports with Flying Lizard	No Entries	(United States) #50 Chouest Povoledo Racing
3	R1	(Louisiana) NOLA	(Mexico) Memo Gidley	(Mexico) Memo Gidley	No Entries	(United States) Ross Chouest
3	R2	(Louisiana) NOLA		(United States) #101 TKO Motorsports with Flying Lizard	No Entries	(United States) #8 Flying Lizard Motorsports
3	R2	(Louisiana) NOLA		(Mexico) Memo Gidley	No Entries	(United States) Elias Sabo
4	R1	(Texas) COTA	(United States) #56 SKI Autosports	(United States) #04 Crowdstrike Racing by Riley Motorsports	No Entries	(United States) #50 Chouest Povoledo Racing
4	R1	(Texas) COTA	(United States) Johnny O'Connell	(United States) George Kurtz	No Entries	(United States) Ross Chouest
4	R2	(Texas) COTA		(United States) #27 CRP Racing	No Entries	(United States) #8 Flying Lizard Motorsports
4	R2	(Texas) COTA		(United States) Jason Daskalos	No Entries	(United States) Elias Sabo
5	R1	Virginia	(United States) #120 Wright Motorsports	(United States) #101 TKO Motorsports with Flying Lizard	No Finishers	(Germany) #099 Rotek Racing
5	R1	Virginia	(United States) Adam Adelson	(Mexico) Memo Gidley	No Finishers	(United States) Robb Holland
5	R2	Virginia		(United States) #101 TKO Motorsports with Flying Lizard	(United States) #58 GMG Racing	(Germany) #099 Rotek Racing
5	R2	Virginia		(Mexico) Memo Gidley	(United States) CJ Moses	(United States) Robb Holland
6	R1	(Tennessee) Nashville	(United States) #27 CRP Racing	(United States) #3 SKI Autosports	No Entries	(Germany) #099 Rotek Racing
6	R1	(Tennessee) Nashville	(United States) Jason Daskalos	(United States) Johnny O'Connell	No Entries	(United States) Robb Holland
6	R2	(Tennessee) Nashville		(United States) #27 CRP Racing	No Entries	(Germany) #099 Rotek Racing
6	R2	(Tennessee) Nashville		(United States) Jason Daskalos	No Entries	(United States) Robb Holland
7	R1	(Wisconsin) Road America	(United States) #101 TKO Motorsports with Flying Lizard	(United States) #04 Crowdstrike Racing by Riley Motorsports	No Entries	(United States) #8 Flying Lizard Motorsports
7	R1	(Wisconsin) Road America	(Mexico) Memo Gidley	(United States) George Kurtz	No Entries	(United States) Elias Sabo
7	R2	(Wisconsin) Road America		(United States) #04 Crowdstrike Racing by Riley Motorsports	No Entries	(Germany) #099 Rotek Racing
7	R2	(Wisconsin) Road America		(United States) George Kurtz	No Entries	(United States) Robb Holland
8	R1	(Florida) Sebring	(United States) #101 TKO Motorsports with Flying Lizard	(United States) #101 TKO Motorsports with Flying Lizard	No Entries	(United States) #2 Flying Lizard Motorsports
8	R1	(Florida) Sebring	(Mexico) Memo Gidley	(Mexico) Memo Gidley	No Entries	(United States) Jason Bell
8	R2	(Florida) Sebring		(United States) #27 CRP Racing	No Entries	(United States) #5 Blackdog Speed Shop
8	R2	(Florida) Sebring		(United States) Jason Daskalos	No Entries	(United States) Tony Gaples
9	R1	(Indiana) Indianapolis	(United States) #101 TKO Motorsports with Flying Lizard	(United States) #101 TKO Motorsports with Flying Lizard	(United States) #80 Lone Star Racing	(Germany) #099 Rotek Racing
9	R1	(Indiana) Indianapolis	(Mexico) Memo Gidley	(Mexico) Memo Gidley	(United States) Dan Knox	(United States) Robb Holland
9	R2	(Indiana) Indianapolis		(United States) #101 TKO Motorsports with Flying Lizard	(United States) #094 Chicago Performance & Tuning, Co.	(Germany) #099 Rotek Racing
9	R2	(Indiana) Indianapolis		(Mexico) Memo Gidley	(United States) Kevin Woods	(United States) Robb Holland

== Championship Standings ==
Scoring System

Championship points are awarded for the first ten positions in each race. Entries are required to complete 75% of the winning car's race distance in order to be classified and earn points.

Position	**1st**	**2nd**	**3rd**	**4th**	**5th**	**6th**	**7th**	**8th**	**9th**	**10th**
Points	25	18	15	12	10	8	6	4	2	1

=== Drivers' Championships ===
Pos.	Driver	Team	STP (Florida)		SON (California)		NOL (Louisiana)		COA (Texas)		VIR (Virginia)		NSH (Tennessee)		ELK (Wisconsin)		SEB (Florida)		IND (Indiana)		Points
Pos.	Driver	Team	RD1	RD2	RD1	RD2	RD1	RD2	RD1	RD2	RD1	RD2	RD1	RD2	RD1	RD2	RD1	RD2	RD1	RD2	Points
SRO3
1	(Mexico) Memo Gidley	(United States) TKO Motorsports with Flying Lizard	2	1	1	3	1	1	11	5	DSQ	1	3	3	2	2	1	2	1	1	327
2	(United States) Jason Daskalos	(United States) CRP Racing	1	3	4	4	2	3	2	1	Ret	2	2	1	Ret	3	2	1	8	5	277
3	(United States) George Kurtz	(United States) CrowdStrike Racing by Riley Motorsports	Ret	8	3	2	4	2	1	3	2	5			1	1	4	4	3	2	242
4	(United States) Johnny O'Connell	(United States) SKI Autosports					6	5	6	11	15	3	1	2	5	Ret	7	3	2	4	159
5=	(United States) Anthony Bartone	(United States) Bartone Bros Racing with RealTime	6	4	5	1	7	6	5	12	14	7			4	4	5	7			137
5=	(United States) Adam Adelson	(United States) Wright Motorsports			2	20	3	4	7	2	Ret	4			3	DNS	3	5	DNS	3	137
7	(United States) Todd Treffert	(United States) CRP Racing			6	6	5	10	4	6	1	6	Ret	13	DNS	DNS	6	6	20	6	106
8	(Germany) Mirco Schultis	(Germany) Mishumotors	5	7	9	7	8	7					4	4	6	6	17	DNS	4	7	93
9	(United States) Andy Wilzoch	(United States) Flying Lizard Motorsports	7	Ret	8	8	9	8	8	4	5	9	11	9	11	7	9	8	DNS	DNS	78
10	(United States) Alex Vogel	(United Kingdom) OnlyFans Racing With P1 Groupe By MRS	16	18	10	18	10	9			4	10	8	5	10	10	8	9	10	9	61
11	(United States) James Sofronas	(United States) GMG Racing	3	2					3	21					DNS	DNS					48
12	(United States) Kyle Washington	(United States) GMG Racing			7	5									7	8			5	8	40
13	(United States) Andy Pilgrim	(United States) Bartone Bros Racing with RealTime	4	5																	22
14	(United States) Vincent Barletta	(United States) Turner Motorsports									3	8									19
15=	(United States) Marc Austin	(United States) Lone Star Racing							9	19					9	9			9	10	14
15=	(United States) Brian Lock	(United States) CDR Valkyrie													8	5					14
17	(United States) Scott Smithson	(United States) DXDT Racing	Ret	6													DNS	DNS	DNS	DNS	8
18	(United States) Peter Pejascevich	(United Kingdom) OnlyFans Racing With P1 Groupe By MRS							10	13											3
19	(United States) Jeff Burton	(United States) DXDT Racing	Ret	DNS																	0
	(United States) Ziad Ghandour	(United States) TR3 Racing			DNS	DNS															0
	(United States) John Roberts	(United States) Fast Track Racing																	WD	WD	0
GT2
1	(United States) CJ Moses	(United States) GMG Racing									Ret	11							11	12	75
Ineligible to score points
	(United States) Kevin Woods	(United States) Chicago Performance & Tuning, Co.																	7	11	-
	(United States) Dan Knox	(United States) Lone Star Racing																	6	13	-
GT4
1	(United States) Jason Bell	(United States) Flying Lizard Motorsports	10	9	12	19	12	15	13	8	8	15	6	8	13	12	10	11	13	15	279
2	(United States) Robb Holland	(Germany) Rotek Racing			11	Ret	13	13	19	14	6	12	5	6	24	11	11	12	12	14	277
3	(United States) Ross Chouest	(United States) Chouest Povoledo Racing	8	Ret	13	11	11	14	12	16	7	13	7	7	14	16	19	16	15	16	242
4	(United States) Gray Newell	(United States) Heart of Racing Team	9	10	16	13	14	18	14	9	17	WD	Ret	10	17	14	14	14	14	17	179
5	(United States) Tony Gaples	(United States) Blackdog Speed Shop	17	11	20	15	16	16	15	10	11	14	12	11	15	21	13	10	17	18	165
6	(United States) Elias Sabo	(United States) Flying Lizard Motorsports			15	10	15	11	16	7	Ret	DNS			12	13	12	DNS	DNS	DNS	153
7	(United States) Nicholas Shanny	(United States) TGR Carrus Callas Racing Team	14	15	17	17	17	20	18	15	16	16	9	12	19	18	18	18	18	Ret	87
8	(United States) Tim Savage	(United States) TRG - The Racers Group			19	12					9	19			22	17	15	13	16	19	74
9	(United States) Todd Coleman	(United States) Archangel Motorsports	18	16	14	16	19	12	DNS	DNS											41
10	(United States) Scott Blind	(United States) Archangel Motorsports													16	15	16	15			34
11	(United States) Jon Branam	(United States) TR3 Racing				9															25
12	(United States) Paul Kiebler	(United States) TR3 Racing			21		20	19	17	20	13	17									24
13	(United States) Matt Joffe	(United States) Extreme Velocity Motorsports					18	17			12	18									22
14=	Moisey Uretsky	(United States) Accelerating Performance	11	14																	20
14=	(United States) Steve Weber	(United States) Team ACP Tangerine	12	13																	20
14=	(United States) Kenneth Goldberg	(United States) Team ACP Tangerine	13	12																	20
17=	(United States) John Roberts	(United States) Fast Track Racing							20	DNS					18	20					13
17=	(United States) Todd Parriott	(United States) GMG Racing													21	19			19	20	13
19	(United States) Rob Walker	(United States) Auto Technic Racing			18	14															12
20=	(United States) Chris Alliegro	(Germany) Rotek Racing									10	Ret									10
20=	(United States) Rusty Bittle	(United States) Flatrock Motorsports											10	Ret							10
22	(United States) Thomas Johnson	(United States) RENNtech Motorsports	15	17																	6
23	(Canada) Thomas Collingwood	(United States) BGB Motorsports	DNS	DNS													20	17			5
24=	(United States) Jay Logan	(United States) GMG Racing							Ret	18											2
24=	(United States) Brady Behrman	(United States) Van der Steur Racing													20	Ret					2
Pos.	Driver	Team	STP (Florida)		SON (California)		NOL (Louisiana)		COA (Texas)		VIR (Virginia)		NSH (Tennessee)		ELK (Wisconsin)		SEB (Florida)		IND (Indiana)		Points

Key
Colour	Result
Gold	Race winner
Silver	2nd place
Bronze	3rd place
Green	Points finish
Blue	Non-points finish
Blue	Non-classified finish (NC)
Purple	Did not finish (Ret)
Black	Disqualified (DSQ)
Black	Excluded (EX)
White	Did not start (DNS)
White	Race cancelled (C)
White	Withdrew (WD)
Blank	Did not participate

**Bold** – Pole

Italics – Fastest Lap

Notes:

- † – Driver did not finish the race but was classified, as he completed more than 75% of the race distance.

=== Teams' Championships ===
Each team receives championship points for its highest car finishing position in each race. The positions of subsequent finishing cars from the same team are not considered in the results and all other cars are elevated in the finishing positions accordingly.

Pos.	Team	Manufacturer	STP (Florida)		SON (California)		NOL (Louisiana)		COA (Texas)		VIR (Virginia)		NSH (Tennessee)		ELK (Wisconsin)		SEB (Florida)		IND (Indiana)		Points
Pos.	Team	Manufacturer	RD1	RD2	RD1	RD2	RD1	RD2	RD1	RD2	RD1	RD2	RD1	RD2	RD1	RD2	RD1	RD2	RD1	RD2	Points
SRO3
1	(United States) TKO Motorsports with Flying Lizard	Mercedes-AMG	2	1	1	3	1	1	11	5	DSQ	1	3	3	2	2	1	2	1	1	332
2	(United States) CRP Racing	Mercedes-AMG	1	3	4	4	2	3	2	1	1	2	2	1	Ret	3	2	1	8	5	302
3	(United States) CrowdStrike Racing by Riley Motorsports	Mercedes-AMG	Ret	8	3	2	4	2	1	3	2	5			1	1	4	4	3	2	244
4	(United States) SKI Autosports	Ferrari; Audi					6	5	6	11	15	3	1	2	5	Ret	7	3	2	4	165
5	(United States) Bartone Bros Racing with RealTime	Mercedes-AMG	6	4	5	1	7	6	5	12	14	7			4	4	5	7			151
6	(United States) Wright Motorsports	Porsche			2	20	3	4	7	2	Ret	4			3	DNS	3	5	DNS	3	140
7	(Germany) Mishumotors	Callaway	5	7	9	7	8	7					4	4	6	6	17	DNS	4	7	104
8	(United States) GMG Racing	Audi; Porsche	3	2	7	5			3	21					7	8			5	8	93
9	(United States) Flying Lizard Motorsports	Porsche	7	Ret	8	8	9	8	8	4	5	9	11	9	11	7	9	8	DNS	DNS	92
10	(United Kingdom) OnlyFans Racing With P1 Groupe By MRS	Porsche	16	18	10	18	10	9	10	13	4	10	8	5	10	10	8	9	10	9	80
11	(United States) Turner Motorsports	BMW									3	8									21
12	(United States) Lone Star Racing	Mercedes-AMG							9	19					9	9			9	10	18
13	(United States) CDR Valkyrie	Nissan													8	5					14
14	(United States) DXDT Racing	Mercedes-AMG	Ret	6																	10
	(United States) TR3 Racing	Mercedes-AMG			DNS	DNS															0
GT2
1	(United States) GMG Racing	Audi									Ret	11							11	12	75
Ineligible to score points
	(United States) Kevin Woods	KTM																	7	11	-
	(United States) Lone Star Racing	Mercedes-AMG																	6	13	-
GT4
1	(United States) Flying Lizard Motorsports	Aston Martin	10	9	12	10	12	11	13	7	8	15	6	8	12	12	10	11	13	15	344
2	(Germany) Rotek Racing	Porsche			11	Ret	13	13	19	14	6	12	5	6	24	11	11	12	12	14	281
3	(United States) Chouest Povoledo Racing	Aston Martin	8	Ret	13	11	11	14	12	16	7	13	7	7	14	16	19	16	15	16	259
4	(United States) Heart of Racing Team	Aston Martin	9	10	16	13	14	18	14	9	17	WD	Ret	10	17	14	14	14	14	17	195
5	(United States) Blackdog Speed Shop	Chevrolet	17	11	20	15	16	16	15	10	11	14	12	11	15	21	13	10	17	18	191
6	(United States) TGR Carrus Callas Racing Team	Toyota	14	15	17	17	17	20	18	15	16	16	9	12	19	18	18	18	18	Ret	114
7	(United States) Archangel Motorsports	Aston Martin	18	16	14	16	19	12	DNS	DNS					16	15	16	15			86
8	(United States) TRG - The Racers Group	Aston Martin			19	12					9	19			22	17	15	13	16	19	81
9	(United States) TR3 Racing	Aston Martin			21	9	20	19	17	20	13	17									58
10	(United States) Extreme Velocity Motorsports	Porsche					18	17			12	18									28
11=	(United States) Accelerating Performance	Aston Martin	11	14																	22
11=	(United States) Team ACP Tangerine	BMW	12	12																	22
13	(United States) Fast Track Racing	BMW							20	DNS					18	20					20
14	(United States) Auto Technic Racing	BMW			18	14															14
15=	(United States) RENNtech Motorsports	Mercedes-AMG	15	17																	10
15=	(United States) GMG Racing	Porsche							Ret	18					21	19					10
15=	(United States) Flatrock Motorsports	Porsche											10	Ret							10
18	(United States) BGB Motorsports	Porsche	DNS	DNS													20	17			6
19	(United States) Van der Steur Racing	Aston Martin													20	Ret					4
Pos.	Team	Manufacturer	STP (Florida)		SON (California)		NOL (Louisiana)		COA (Texas)		VIR (Virginia)		NSH (Tennessee)		ELK (Wisconsin)		SEB (Florida)		IND (Indiana)		Points

Notes:

- † – Driver did not finish the race but was classified, as he completed more than 75% of the race distance.
