= 2024 TC France Series =

4th running of the FFSA GT Championship sports car championship

The 2024 Championnat de France FFSA Tourisme - TC France season was the fourth season of the French FFSA GT Championship, a sports car championship created and organised by the Stephane Ratel Organisation (SRO). The season began on 28 March in Nogaro and ended on 6 October at Paul Ricard.

== Calendar ==
| Round | Circuit | Date |
|---|---|---|
| 1 | Circuit Paul Armagnac, Nogaro, France | 28 March—1 April |
| 2 | Circuit de Lédenon, Lédenon, France | 10–12 May |
| 3 | Circuit de Spa-Francorchamps, Stavelot, Belgium | 21–23 June |
| 4 | Circuit de Nevers Magny-Cours, Magny-Cours, France | 23–25 August |
| 5 | Circuit de Dijon-Prenois, Prenois, France | 13–15 September |
| 6 | Circuit Paul Ricard, Le Castellet, France | 4–6 October |

== Entry list ==
| Team | Car | No. | Drivers | Rounds |
TCR entries
| (France) Ti Boy Racing | Audi RS 3 LMS TCR (2021) | 1 | (France) Hervé Boujuau | 1, 3–4 |
| (France) Ti Boy Racing | Audi RS 3 LMS TCR (2021) | 1 | (France) Thomas Léal | 1, 3–4 |
| (France) CDRS | Cupra Leon Competición TCR | 5 | (France) Stéphane Codet | 1–3 |
| (France) CDRS | Cupra León TCR | 60 | (France) Olivier Lopez | 1–2 |
| (France) Optimum Racing-ASM | Cupra Leon Competición TCR | 9 | (France) Julien Paget | 1–4 |
| (France) Dijon Racing Team by Clairet Sport | Cupra León VZ TCR | 12 | (France) Thomas Comparot | 4 |
| (France) Dijon Racing Team by Clairet Sport | Cupra León VZ TCR | 12 | (France) Benjamin Mosson | 4 |
| (France) Team Clairet Sport | Audi RS 3 LMS TCR (2021) | 28 | (France) Sébastien Thome | 2–4 |
| (France) Team Clairet Sport | Audi RS 3 LMS TCR (2021) | 81 | (France) Stéphane Ventaja | 1 |
| (France) Team Clairet Sport | Cupra Leon Competición TCR | 81 | (France) Stéphane Ventaja | 2 |
| (France) Circuit Toys | Hyundai i30 N TCR | 30 | (Switzerland) Christian von der Weid | 3–4 |
| (France) Circuit Toys | Hyundai i30 N TCR | 30 | (Switzerland) Christian Suter | 3–4 |
| (France) Team Leal Competition | Volkswagen Golf GTI TCR | 39 | (France) Michel Leal | 1 |
| (France) SP Compétition | Cupra León VZ TCR | 34 | (Belgium) Giovanni Scamardi | 3 |
| (France) SP Compétition | Cupra Leon Competición TCR1–3, 5 Cupra León VZ TCR 4 | 76 | (France) Gilles Chauvin | 1–4 |
| (France) SP Compétition | Cupra Leon Competición TCR1–2; Cupra León VZ TCR 3–4 | 77 | (France) Sylvain Pussier | 1–4 |
TC entries
| (France) Team Pilote 69 by 2RT | Peugeot 308 Racing Cup | 3 | (France) José Beltramelli | 1–4 |
| (France) Team Pilote 69 by 2RT | Peugeot 308 Racing Cup | 3 | (France) Viny Beltramelli | 1–4 |
| (France) Team Pilote 69 by 2RT | Peugeot 308 Racing Cup | 10 | (France) Brady Beltramelli | 1–4 |
| (France) 2RT | Peugeot 208 Racing TC | 49 | (France) Kévin Ropars | 1–4 |
| (France) JSB Compétition | Peugeot 308 Racing Cup | 16 | (France) Franck Salvi | 1–4 |
| (France) JSB Compétition | Peugeot 308 Racing Cup | 69 | (France) Rodolphe Spitz | 3 |
| (France) JSB Compétition | Peugeot 308 Racing Cup | 98 | (France) Pierre-Arnaud Navarro | 1–3 |
| (France) JSB Compétition | Peugeot 308 Racing Cup | 145 | (France) Raphaël Fournier | 1–4 |
| (France) J'Nov Auto Racing by JSB | Peugeot 308 Racing Cup | 79 | (France) Laurent Joubert | 1–4 |
| (France) Team Clairet Sport | Peugeot 308 Racing Cup | 21 | (France) Veenesh Shunker | 2–3 |
| (France) eXigence Motorsport | Mini JCW Pro TC | 37 | (France) Benjamin Breton | 1 |
| (France) eXigence Motorsport | Mini JCW R53 Challenge | 378 | (Switzerland) Christophe Gaillard | 1 |
TCA entries
| (France) Fox Racing Team | Renault Clio Cup | 26 | (France) Michel Beziat | 2, 4 |
| (France) Fox Racing Team | Renault Clio Cup | 26 | (France) Bastien Girard | 2, 4 |
| (France) DT Performance by CDRS | Peugeot RCZ Cup | 27 | (France) Thomas Drouin | 3 |
| (France) CDRS | Peugeot RCZ Cup | 61 | (France) Franck Labescat | 1–4 |
| (France) Team Leal Competition | Renault Clio Cup | 95 | (France) Christophe Henry | 1–4 |
| (France) Team Leal Competition | Renault Clio Cup | 95 | (France) Lubin Henry | 1–3 |
| (France) Hop Turtle | Renault Clio Cup | 99 | (France) Eric Oddos-Piantone | 3 |
| (France) ADWShop Motorsport | Mini Cooper R56 MCS-R | 115 | (France) Mickaël Boisdur | 1–4 |
| (France) ADWShop Motorsport | Mini Cooper R56 MCS-R | 121 | (France) Victor Louzon | 1, 3 |
| (France) ADWShop Motorsport | Mini Cooper R56 MCS-R | 122 | (France) Victor Benmoussa | 3–4 |
| (France) ADWShop Motorsport | Mini Cooper R56 MCS-R | 122 | (France) Julien Thibout | 3 |
| (France) ADWShop Motorsport | Mini Cooper R56 MCS-R | 127 | (France) Quentin Prudent | 1–4 |
| (France) eXigence Motorsport | Mini JCW R53 Challenge | 378 | (Switzerland) Christophe Gaillard | 3 |
TCA Light entries
| (France) First Racing | Peugeot 208 Racing Cup | 14 | (France) Vincent Vevres | 2–4 |
| (France) First Racing | Peugeot 208 Racing Cup | 14 | (France) Anthony Naniot | 3 |
| (France) First Racing | Peugeot 208 Racing Cup | 14 | (Portugal) Fabien Jeanblanc | 4 |
| (France) First Racing | Peugeot 208 Racing Cup | 53 | (France) Tony Roches | 3–4 |
| (France) First Racing | Peugeot 208 Racing Cup | 53 | (France) Lenny Roches | 3–4 |
| (France) Boreau Team Sport by JSB | Peugeot 208 Racing Cup | 17 | (France) Colin Boreau | 1–4 |
| (France) JSB Compétition | Peugeot 208 Racing Cup | 19 | (France) Léo Berson | 1–4 |
| (France) JSB Compétition | Peugeot 208 Racing Cup | 20 | (France) Martial Camurac | 1–4 |
| (France) JSB Compétition | Peugeot 208 Racing Cup | 24 | (France) Yannis Lafon | 1–4 |
| (France) JFM Racing | Peugeot 208 Racing Cup | 25 | (France) Karel Eyoum | 1–4 |
| (France) JFM Racing | Peugeot 208 Racing Cup | 44 | (France) Arthur Salvi | 1–4 |
| (France) Sport Auto Racing | Peugeot 208 Racing Cup | 36 | (France) Frederic Rondeau | 1, 3–4 |
| (France) Sport Auto Racing | Peugeot 208 Racing Cup | 36 | (France) Sylvain Gonzales | 1 |
| (France) Sport Auto Racing | Peugeot 208 Racing Cup | 85 | (France) Margot Carvalhido | 3–4 |
| (France) Sport Auto Racing | Peugeot 208 Racing Cup | 85 | (France) Sylvain Gonzales | 4 |
| (France) SP Compétition | Peugeot 208 Racing Cup | 38 | (France) Tom Pussier | 1–4 |
| (France) DLM Compétition by GM Sport | Peugeot 208 Racing Cup | 56 | (France) Damien Le Marchand | 3 |
| (France) Team Montbéliard | Peugeot 208 Racing Cup | 59 | (France) Guillaume Lignier | 3 |
| (France) Team Montbéliard | Peugeot 208 Racing Cup | 90 | (France) Maxime Cicilliani | 3 |
| (France) Track Advisor by 2RT | Peugeot 208 Racing Cup | 70 | (France) Florent Lecerf | 1–4 |
| (France) Track Advisor by 2RT | Peugeot 208 Racing Cup | 70 | (Portugal) Fabien Jeanblanc | 1–3 |
| (France) Track Advisor by 2RT | Peugeot 208 Racing Cup | 70 | (France) Kenny Porte | 4 |
| (France) 2RT | Peugeot 208 Racing Cup | 212 | (France) Matthieu Collin | 1–4 |
| (France) Comte Racing Team | Peugeot 208 Racing Cup | 73 | (France) Hervé Sivignon | 3 |
| (France) Comte Racing Team | Peugeot 208 Racing Cup | 842 | (Germany) Daniel Alger | 1–4 |
| (France) Comte Racing Team | Peugeot 208 Racing Cup | 842 | (France) Nicolas Roumezy | 1–4 |
| (France) Team Raga by Rossel Sport | Peugeot 208 Racing Cup | 153 | (France) Laurent Raga | 1–4 |
GT Light entries
| (France) Chazel Technologie Course | Alpine A110 Cup | 2 | (France) Jean-Paul Dominici | 3 |
| (France) Chazel Technologie Course | Alpine A110 Cup | 96 | (France) Armand Fumal | 3 |
| (France) STR | Ginetta G55 Supercup | 13 | (Australia) David Levy | 1–4 |
| (France) STR | Ginetta G55 Supercup | 13 | (France) Guillaume Rousseau | 1–4 |
| (France) CDRS | Ligier JS2 R | 23 | (France) Jean-Jacques Galli | 1–3 |
| (France) CDRS | Ligier JS2 R | 23 | (France) Christophe Isaac | 1, 3 |
| (France) CDRS | Ligier JS2 R | 29 | (France) David Chiche | 1–4 |
| (France) CDRS | Ligier JS2 R | 33 | (France) Pierre-Alexis Lacorte | 1–4 |
| (France) CDRS | Ligier JS2 R | 33 | (France) Nicolas Labat-Camy | 4 |
| (France) CDRS | Ligier JS2 R | 40 | (France) Julien Nougaret | 3 |
| (France) CDRS | Ligier JS2 R | 40 | (France) Dorian Duthil | 3 |
| (France) SPX Competition | Ligier JS2 R | 31 | (France) Ewen Hachez | 3 |
| (France) SPX Competition | Ligier JS2 R | 31 | (France) Clement Moreno | 3 |
| (France) HMC | Ligier JS2 R | 35 | (France) Nicco Ferrarin | 2 |
| (France) AGS Events | Ligier JS2 R | 89 | (France) Nicco Ferrarin | 3–4 |
GT Academy entries
| (France) Styl&Grip | Ginetta G56 GTA | 6 | (France) Mehdi Bouarfa | 1–4 |
| (France) Styl&Grip | Ginetta G56 GTA | 7 | (France) Ethan Gialdini | 1–4 |
| (France) Styl&Grip | Ginetta G56 GTA | 7 | (France) Sonia Roussel | 2–3 |
| (France) Styl&Grip | Ginetta G56 GTA | 333 | (Switzerland) Xavier Canonica | 1–4 |
| (France) Tierce Racing | Ginetta G56 GTA | 11 | (France) Corentin Tierce | 1–3 |
| (France) Tierce Racing | Ginetta G56 GTA | 11 | (France) Romain Brun | 1 |
| (France) Tierce Racing | Ginetta G56 GTA | 51 | (France) Thibaut Mogica | 1–4 |
| (France) Tierce Racing | Ginetta G56 GTA | 125 | (France) Alexandre Monnot | 1–4 |

== Results ==
Bold indicates the overall winner.

| Round | | Circuit | Date | Pole position | TCR Winners | TC Winners | TCA Winners | TCA Light Winners | GT Light Winners | GT Academy Winners | Results |
|---|---|---|---|---|---|---|---|---|---|---|---|
| 1 | R1 | (France) Circuit Paul Armagnac | 31 March | (France) No. 9 Optimum Racing-ASM | (France) No. 9 Optimum Racing-ASM | (France) No. 3 Team Pilote 69 by 2RT | (France) No. 61 CDRS | (France) No. 19 JSB Compétition | (France) No. 13 STR | (France) No. 7 Styl&Grip | |
| 1 | R1 | (France) Circuit Paul Armagnac | 31 March | (France) Julien Paget | (France) Julien Paget | (France) Viny Beltramelli | (France) Franck Labescat | (France) Léo Berson | (France) Guillaume Rousseau | (France) Ethan Gialdini | |
| 1 | R2 | (France) Circuit Paul Armagnac | 31 March | | (France) No. 81 Team Clairet Sport | (France) No. 79 J'Nov Auto Racing by JSB | (France) No. 61 CDRS | (France) No. 17 Boreau Team Sport by JSB | (France) No. 29 CDRS | (France) No. 51 Tierce Racing | |
| 1 | R2 | (France) Circuit Paul Armagnac | 31 March | | (France) Stéphane Ventaja | (France) Laurent Joubert | (France) Franck Labescat | (France) Colin Boreau | (France) David Chiche | (France) Thibaut Mogica | |
| 1 | R3 | (France) Circuit Paul Armagnac | 1 April | (France) No. 9 Optimum Racing-ASM | (France) No. 5 CDRS | (France) No. 3 Team Pilote 69 by 2RT | (France) No. 61 CDRS | (France) No. 25 JFM Racing | (France) No. 29 CDRS | (France) No. 7 Styl&Grip | |
| 1 | R3 | (France) Circuit Paul Armagnac | 1 April | (France) Julien Paget | (France) Stéphane Codet | (France) Viny Beltramelli | (France) Franck Labescat | (France) Karel Eyoum | (France) David Chiche | (France) Ethan Gialdini | |
| 1 | R4 | (France) Circuit Paul Armagnac | 1 April | | (France) No. 9 Optimum Racing-ASM | (France) No. 145 JSB Compétition | (France) No. 61 CDRS | (France) No. 19 JSB Compétition | (France) No. 13 STR | (France) No. 51 Tierce Racing | |
| 1 | R4 | (France) Circuit Paul Armagnac | 1 April | | (France) Julien Paget | (France) Raphaël Fournier | (France) Franck Labescat | (France) Léo Berson | (Australia) David Levy | (France) Thibaut Mogica | |
| 2 | R1 | (France) Circuit de Lédenon | 11 May | (France) No. 35 HMC | (France) No. 28 Team Clairet Sport | (France) No. 98 JSB Compétition | (France) No. 61 CDRS | (France) No. 17 Boreau Team Sport by JSB | (France) No. 29 CDRS | (France) No. 27 Styl&Grip | |
| 2 | R1 | (France) Circuit de Lédenon | 11 May | (France) Nicco Ferrarin | (France) Sébastien Thome | **(France)** Pierre-Arnaud Navarro | (France) Franck Labescat | (France) Colin Boreau | (France) David Chiche | (France) Ethan Gialdini | |
| 2 | R2 | (France) Circuit de Lédenon | 11 May | | (France) No. 28 Team Clairet Sport | (France) No. 98 JSB Compétition | (France) No. 61 CDRS | (France) No. 17 Boreau Team Sport by JSB | (France) No. 29 CDRS | (France) No. 11 Tierce Racing | |
| 2 | R2 | (France) Circuit de Lédenon | 11 May | | (France) Sébastien Thome | **(France)** Pierre-Arnaud Navarro | (France) Franck Labescat | (France) Colin Boreau | (France) David Chiche | (France) Corentin Tierce | |
| 2 | R3 | (France) Circuit de Lédenon | 12 May | (France) No. 9 Optimum Racing-ASM | (France) No. 9 Optimum Racing-ASM | (France) No. 145 JSB Compétition | (France) No. 61 CDRS | (France) No. 17 Boreau Team Sport by JSB | (France) No. 35 HMC | (France) No. 27 Styl&Grip | |
| 2 | R3 | (France) Circuit de Lédenon | 12 May | (France) Julien Paget | (France) Julien Paget | (France) Raphaël Fournier | (France) Franck Labescat | (France) Colin Boreau | (France) Nicco Ferrarin | (France) Ethan Gialdini | |
| 2 | R4 | (France) Circuit de Lédenon | 12 May | | (France) No. 9 Optimum Racing-ASM | (France) No. 98 JSB Compétition | (France) No. 61 CDRS | (France) No. 17 Boreau Team Sport by JSB | (France) No. 35 HMC | (France) No. 11 Tierce Racing | |
| 2 | R4 | (France) Circuit de Lédenon | 12 May | | (France) Julien Paget | **(France)** Pierre-Arnaud Navarro | (France) Franck Labescat | (France) Colin Boreau | (France) Nicco Ferrarin | (France) Corentin Tierce | |
| 3 | R1 | (Belgium) Circuit de Spa-Francorchamps | 22 June | (France) No. 34 SP Compétition | (France) No. 34 SP Compétition | (France) No. 3 Team Pilote 69 by 2RT | (France) No. 27 DT Performance by CDRS | (France) No. 17 Boreau Team Sport by JSB | (France) No. 31 SPX Competition | (France) No. 27 Styl&Grip | |
| 3 | R1 | (Belgium) Circuit de Spa-Francorchamps | 22 June | (Belgium) Giovanni Scamard | (Belgium) Giovanni Scamard | (France) Viny Beltramelli | (France) Thomas Drouin | (France) Colin Boreau | (France) Ewen Hachez | (France) Ethan Gialdini | |
| 3 | R2 | (Belgium) Circuit de Spa-Francorchamps | 22 June | | (France) No. 1 Ti Boy Racing | (France) No. 98 JSB Compétition | (France) No. 27 DT Performance by CDRS | (France) No. 25 JFM Racing | (France) No. 31 SPX Competition | (France) No. 51 Tierce Racing | |
| 3 | R2 | (Belgium) Circuit de Spa-Francorchamps | 22 June | | (France) Thomas Léal | **(France)** Pierre-Arnaud Navarro | (France) Thomas Drouin | (France) Karel Eyoum | (France) Ewen Hachez | (France) Thibaut Mogica | |
| 3 | R3 | (Belgium) Circuit de Spa-Francorchamps | 23 June | (France) No. 34 SP Compétition | (France) No. 34 SP Compétition | (France) No. 3 Team Pilote 69 by 2RT | (France) No. 127 ADWShop Motorsport | (France) No. 25 JFM Racing | (France) No. 89 AGS Events | (France) No. 27 Styl&Grip | |
| 3 | R3 | (Belgium) Circuit de Spa-Francorchamps | 23 June | (Belgium) Giovanni Scamard | (France) Sylvain Pussier | (France) Viny Beltramelli | (France) Quentin Prudent | (France) Karel Eyoum | (France) Nicco Ferrarin | (France) Ethan Gialdini | |
| 3 | R4 | (Belgium) Circuit de Spa-Francorchamps | 23 June | | (France) No. 34 SP Compétition | (France) No. 98 JSB Compétition | (France) No. 27 DT Performance by CDRS | (France) No. 25 JFM Racing | (France) No. 89 AGS Events | (France) No. 27 Styl&Grip | |
| 3 | R4 | (Belgium) Circuit de Spa-Francorchamps | 23 June | | (France) Sylvain Pussier | **(France)** Pierre-Arnaud Navarro | (France) Thomas Drouin | (France) Karel Eyoum | (France) Nicco Ferrarin | (France) Ethan Gialdini | |
| 4 | R1 | (France) Circuit de Nevers Magny-Cours | 24 August | (France) No. 9 Optimum Racing-ASM | (France) No. 28 Team Clairet Sport | **(France)** No. 49 2RT | (France) No. 61 CDRS | (France) No. 17 Boreau Team Sport by JSB | (France) No. 89 AGS Events | (France) No. 51 Tierce Racing | |
| 4 | R1 | (France) Circuit de Nevers Magny-Cours | 24 August | (France) Julien Paget | (France) Sébastien Thome | **(France)** Kévin Ropars | (France) Franck Labescat | (France) Colin Boreau | (France) Nicco Ferrarin | (France) Thibaut Mogica | |
| 4 | R2 | (France) Circuit de Nevers Magny-Cours | 24 August | | (France) No. 28 Team Clairet Sport | **(France)** No. 49 2RT | (France) No. 61 CDRS | (France) No. 17 Boreau Team Sport by JSB | (France) No. 89 AGS Events | (France) No. 51 Tierce Racing | |
| 4 | R2 | (France) Circuit de Nevers Magny-Cours | 24 August | | (France) Sébastien Thome | **(France)** Kévin Ropars | (France) Franck Labescat | (France) Colin Boreau | (France) Nicco Ferrarin | (France) Thibaut Mogica | |
| 4 | R3 | (France) Circuit de Nevers Magny-Cours | 25 August | (France) No. 9 Optimum Racing-ASM | (France) No. 9 Optimum Racing-ASM | **(France)** No. 49 2RT | (France) No. 61 CDRS | (France) No. 17 Boreau Team Sport by JSB | (France) No. 89 AGS Events | (France) No. 27 Styl&Grip | |
| 4 | R3 | (France) Circuit de Nevers Magny-Cours | 25 August | (France) Julien Paget | (France) Julien Paget | **(France)** Kévin Ropars | (France) Franck Labescat | (France) Colin Boreau | (France) Nicco Ferrarin | (France) Ethan Gialdini | |
| 4 | R4 | (France) Circuit de Nevers Magny-Cours | 25 August | | (France) No. 9 Optimum Racing-ASM | **(France)** No. 49 2RT | (France) No. 61 CDRS | (France) No. 17 Boreau Team Sport by JSB | (France) No. 89 AGS Events | (France) No. 125 Tierce Racing | |
| 4 | R4 | (France) Circuit de Nevers Magny-Cours | 25 August | | (France) Julien Paget | **(France)** Kévin Ropars | (France) Franck Labescat | (France) Colin Boreau | (France) Nicco Ferrarin | (France) Alexandre Monnot | |
| 5 | R1 | (France) Circuit de Dijon-Prenois | 14 September | (France) No. 28 Team Clairet Sport | (France) No. 28 Team Clairet Sport | **(France)** No. 37 eXigence Motorsport | (France) No. 61 CDRS | (France) No. 25 JFM Racing | (France) No. 13 STR | (France) No. 27 Styl&Grip | |
| 5 | R1 | (France) Circuit de Dijon-Prenois | 14 September | (France) Sébastien Thome | (France) Sébastien Thome | **(Switzerland)** Christophe Gaillard | (France) Franck Labescat | (France) Karel Eyoum | (France) Guillaume Rousseau | (France) Ethan Gialdini | |
| 5 | R2 | (France) Circuit de Dijon-Prenois | 14 September | | (France) No. 28 Team Clairet Sport | **(France)** No. 37 eXigence Motorsport | (France) No. 61 CDRS | (France) No. 25 JFM Racing | (France) No. 89 AGS Events | (France) No. 125 Tierce Racing | |
| 5 | R2 | (France) Circuit de Dijon-Prenois | 14 September | | (France) Sébastien Thome | **(Switzerland)** Christophe Gaillard | (France) Franck Labescat | (France) Karel Eyoum | (France) Nicco Ferrarin | (France) Alexandre Monnot | |
| 5 | R3 | (France) Circuit de Dijon-Prenois | 15 September | (France) No. 28 Team Clairet Sport | (France) No. 28 Team Clairet Sport | (France) No. 3 Team Pilote 69 by 2RT | (France) No. 61 CDRS | (France) No. 1 LB Compétition | (France) No. 29 CDRS | (France) No. 27 Styl&Grip | |
| 5 | R3 | (France) Circuit de Dijon-Prenois | 15 September | (France) Sébastien Thome | (France) Sébastien Thome | (France) Viny Beltramelli | (France) Franck Labescat | (France) Lucas Guichard | (France) David Chiche | (France) Ethan Gialdini | |
| 5 | R4 | (France) Circuit de Dijon-Prenois | 15 September | | (France) No. 9 Optimum Racing-ASM | **(France)** No. 37 eXigence Motorsport | (France) No. 61 CDRS | (France) No. 1 LB Compétition | (France) No. 89 AGS Events | (France) No. 125 Tierce Racing | |
| 5 | R4 | (France) Circuit de Dijon-Prenois | 15 September | | (France) Julien Paget | **(Switzerland)** Christophe Gaillard | (France) Franck Labescat | (France) Lucas Guichard | (France) Nicco Ferrarin | (France) Alexandre Monnot | |
| 6 | R1 | (France) Circuit Paul Ricard | 5 October | (France) No. 28 Team Clairet Sport | (France) No. 9 Optimum Racing-ASM | **(France)** No. 49 2RT | (France) No. 61 CDRS | (France) No. 25 JFM Racing | (France) No. 89 AGS Events | (France) No. 125 Tierce Racing | |
| 6 | R1 | (France) Circuit Paul Ricard | 5 October | (France) Sébastien Thome | (France) Julien Paget | **(France)** Kévin Ropars | (France) Franck Labescat | (France) Karel Eyoum | (France) Nicco Ferrarin | (France) Alexandre Monnot | |
| 6 | R2 | (France) Circuit Paul Ricard | 5 October | | (France) No. 28 Team Clairet Sport | **(France)** No. 49 2RT | (France) No. 61 CDRS | (France) No. 19 JSB Compétition | (France) No. 89 AGS Events | (France) No. 125 Tierce Racing | |
| 6 | R2 | (France) Circuit Paul Ricard | 5 October | | (France) Sébastien Thome | **(France)** Kévin Ropars | (France) Franck Labescat | (France) Léo Berson | (France) Nicco Ferrarin | (France) Alexandre Monnot | |
| 6 | R3 | (France) Circuit Paul Ricard | 6 October | (France) No. 28 Team Clairet Sport | (France) No. 28 Team Clairet Sport | **(France)** No. 49 2RT | (France) No. 61 CDRS | (France) No. 25 JFM Racing | (France) No. 89 AGS Events | (France) No. 27 Styl&Grip | |
| 6 | R3 | (France) Circuit Paul Ricard | 6 October | (France) Sébastien Thome | (France) Sébastien Thome | **(France)** Kévin Ropars | (France) Franck Labescat | (France) Karel Eyoum | (France) Nicco Ferrarin | (France) Ethan Gialdini | |
| 6 | R4 | (France) Circuit Paul Ricard | 6 October | | (France) No. 34 SP Compétition | (France) No. 145 JSB Compétition | (France) No. 4 eXigence Motorsport | (France) No. 25 JFM Racing | (France) No. 89 AGS Events | (France) No. 51 Tierce Racing | |
| 6 | R4 | (France) Circuit Paul Ricard | 6 October | | (Belgium) Giovanni Scamard | (France) Raphaël Fournier | (France) Benjamin Breton | (France) Karel Eyoum | (France) Nicco Ferrarin | (France) Thibaut Mogica | |

== Championship standings ==
=== Scoring system ===
Championship points are awarded for the first ten positions in each race. Entries are required to complete 75% of the winning car's race distance in order to be classified and earn points.

| Position | 1st | 2nd | 3rd | 4th | 5th | 6th | 7th | 8th | 9th | 10th |
| Points | 25 | 18 | 15 | 12 | 10 | 8 | 6 | 4 | 2 | 1 |

== See also ==
- 2024 TC America Series
