= Acura Integra (2023) =

Compact car

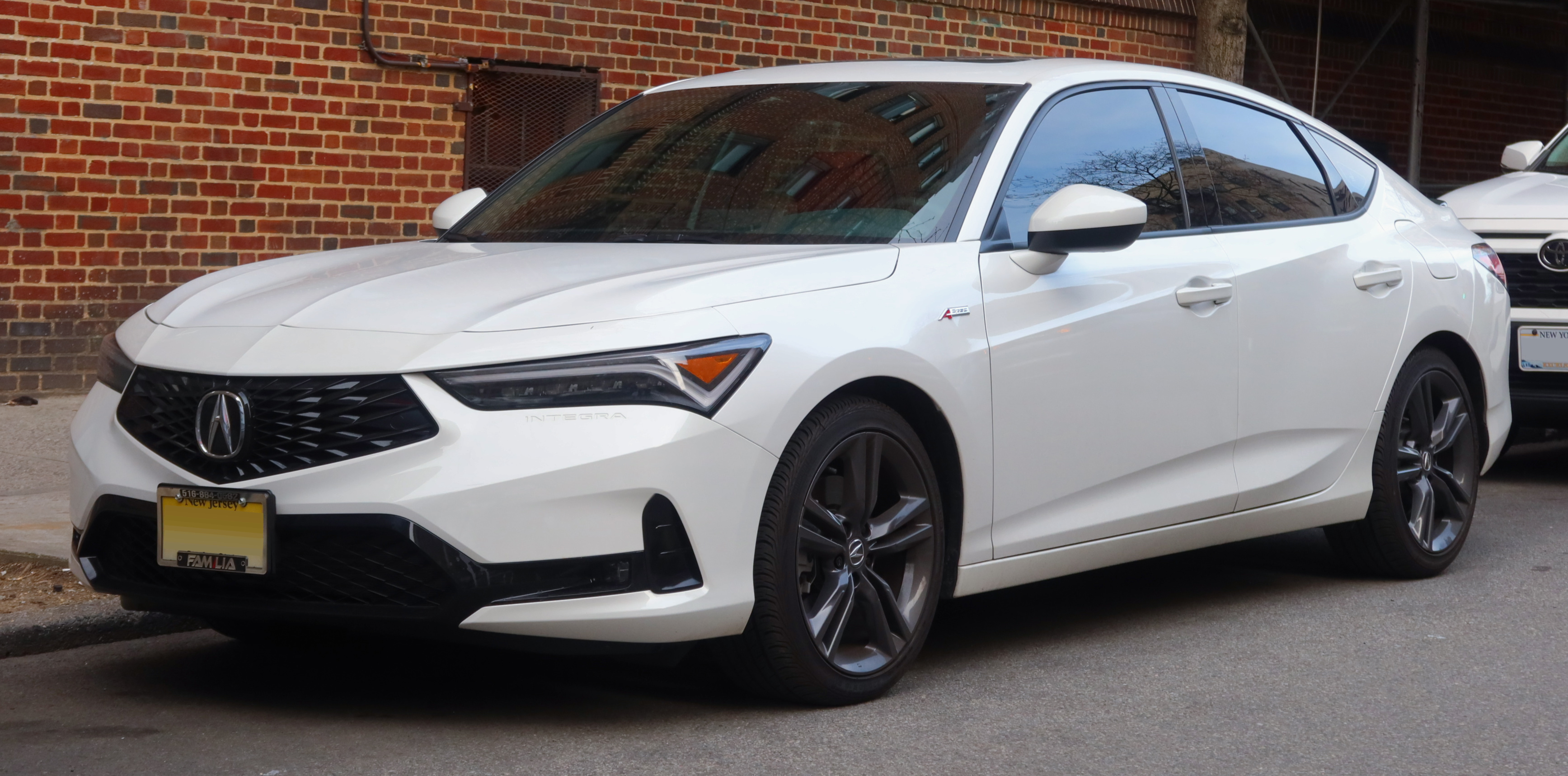
- 2023 Acura Integra A-Spec

Overview
- Manufacturer: Honda
- Model code: DE4; DE5 (Type S)
- Production: May 2022 – present
- Model years: 2023–present
- Assembly: United States: Marysville, Ohio (Marysville Auto Plant)

Body and chassis
- Class: Compact car
- Body style: 5-door liftback
- Layout: Front-engine, front-wheel-drive
- Platform: Honda Architecture (HA)
- Related: Acura ADX; Honda Civic (eleventh generation); Honda ZR-V/HR-V (RZ); Honda CR-V (sixth generation)

Powertrain
- Engine: Gasoline: 1.5 L L15CA DOHC turbocharged I4 (DE4); 2.0 L K20C8 DOHC turbo I4 (DE5)
- Power output: 200 hp (149 kW; 203 PS) (DE4); 320 hp (239 kW; 324 PS) (DE5)
- Transmission: 6-speed manual (DE5 and DE4); CVT (DE4 only)

Dimensions
- Wheelbase: 107.7 in (2,736 mm)
- Length: 185.8 in (4,719 mm) (DE4); 186 in (4,724 mm) (DE5)
- Width: 72 in (1,829 mm) (DE4); 74.8 in (1,900 mm) (DE5)
- Height: 55.5 in (1,410 mm) (DE4); 55.4 in (1,407 mm) (DE5)
- Curb weight: 3,073–3,161 lb (1,394–1,434 kg) (DE4); 3,219 lb (1,460 kg) (DE5)

Chronology
- Predecessor: Acura ILX

The Acura Integra (Japanese: アキュラ・インテグラ, Hepburn: Akyura Integura) (model code DE) is a compact car manufactured by Honda and sold under the Acura brand since 2022. Succeeding the ILX (a sedan based upon the ninth-generation Honda Civic), the Integra is a five-door liftback based on the eleventh-generation Honda Civic.

Acura introduced the DE Integra in North America on June 2, 2022, for the 2023 model year, as Acura's entry level offering in the region. The model reuses the Integra nameplate which had been unused by either Honda or Acura outside China since 2006. The Integra nameplate is also used by Honda in China since 2021, as the twin model of the Civic produced by GAC Honda.

The cargo capacity is 26.1 cubic feet (740 L) with the rear seats up and 76.9 cubic feet (2,180 L) with the rear seats folded down.

In April 2023 for the 2024 model year, Acura released the Type S model as the high-performance model of the Integra sharing many components with the Honda Civic Type R.

== Overview ==
Designed in Japan, Acura presented the production version of the 2023 Integra on March 10, 2022, nearly identical to the pre-production version. The concept's yellow exterior color and decal did not make the production model. The interior of the production Integra shares several parts from the eleventh-generation Civic including its infotainment system, rather than using the infotainment from the existing Acura RDX and Acura MDX. The 107.7-inch wheelbase is the same as the Civic; however, the Integra is longer and stiffer while having unique body panels.

The standard powertrain is a 1.5-liter turbocharged 4-cylinder gasoline engine from the Honda Civic Si producing 200 hp (149 kW; 203 PS) and 192 lb⋅ft (260 N⋅m; 27 kg⋅m) of torque mated to a standard CVT, or an available 6-speed manual transmission with a limited-slip differential. Unlike the previous Japanese-built Integras, this generation is produced in the United States at the Marysville Auto Plant in Marysville, Ohio instead.

The Integra is available in three trim levels: an unnamed base model, the mid-level A-Spec, and the top-tier A-Spec Technology Package. While all models offer a CVT, only the A-Spec Technology Package model offers the six-speed manual transmission.

Pre-orders for the 2023 Integra opened on March 10, 2022, with the first 500 pre-orders also receiving a complimentary exclusive NFT of the vehicle.

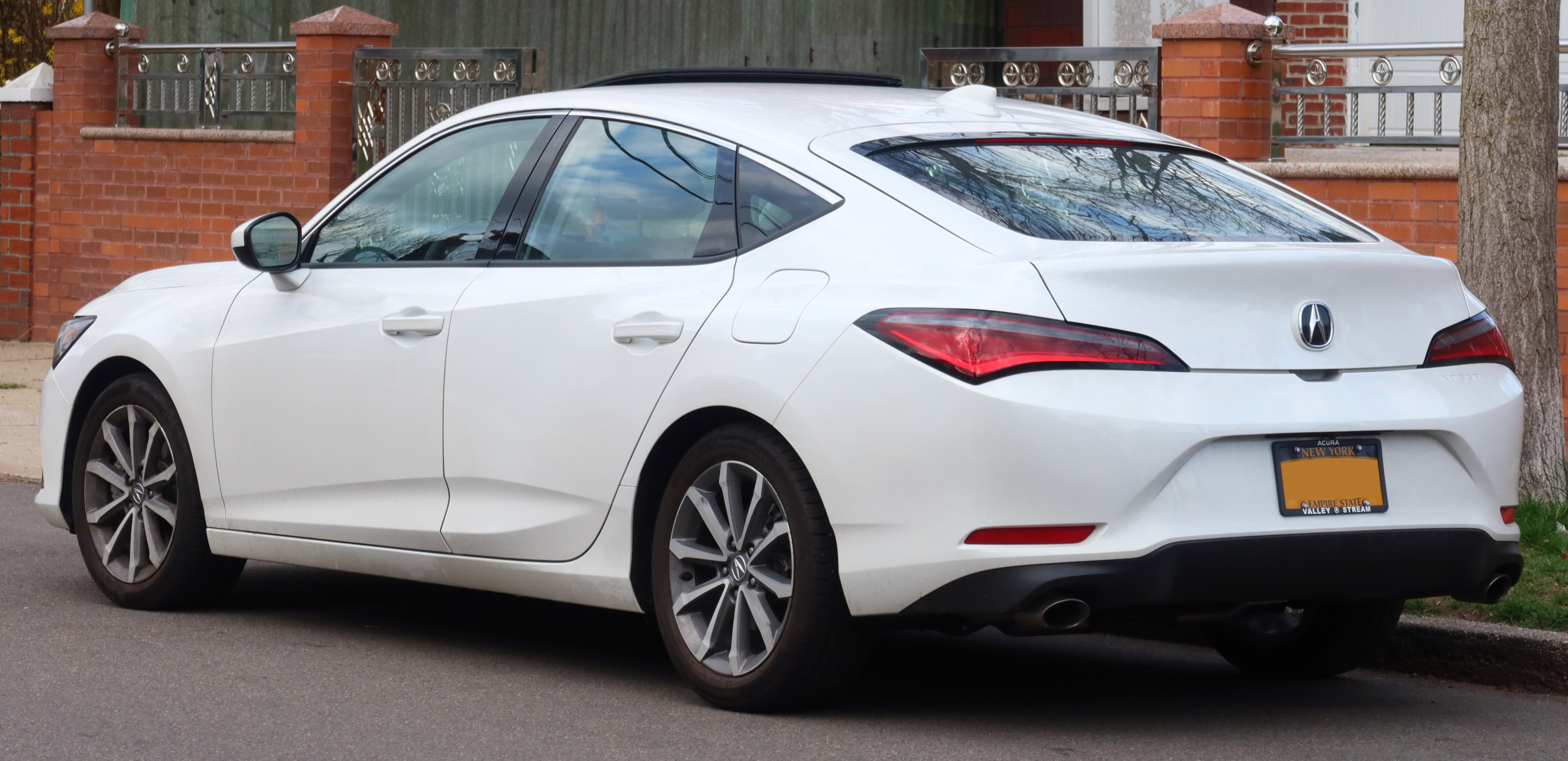
Rear view

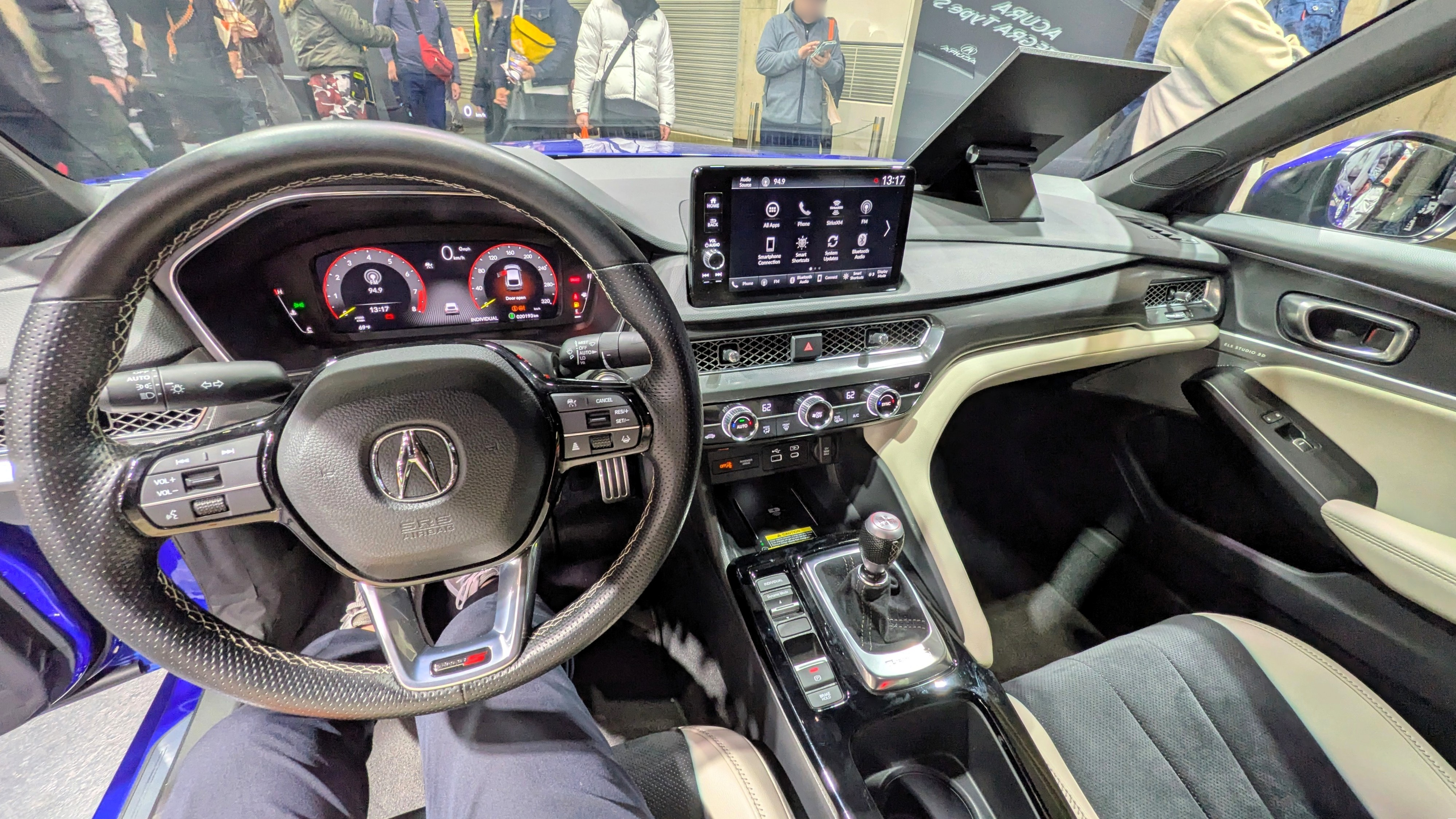
Interior

=== Facelift ===
The Integra received a minor facelift in July 2025 for the 2026 model year. Changes to exterior styling were kept minimal but there were changes such as a new color-matched grille design, new exterior colors and the A-Spec models gained new alloy wheel designs and a new body kit with gloss black pieces. Inside, all Integra models received a standard 9-inch touchscreen infotainment system with wireless compatibility for Android Auto and Apple CarPlay, and standard wireless charging pad, while the A-Spec models gained extended ambient lighting, a new dashboard trim and new blue microsuede inserts for the Orchid interior option. There were no changes made to the powertrain and mechanics.

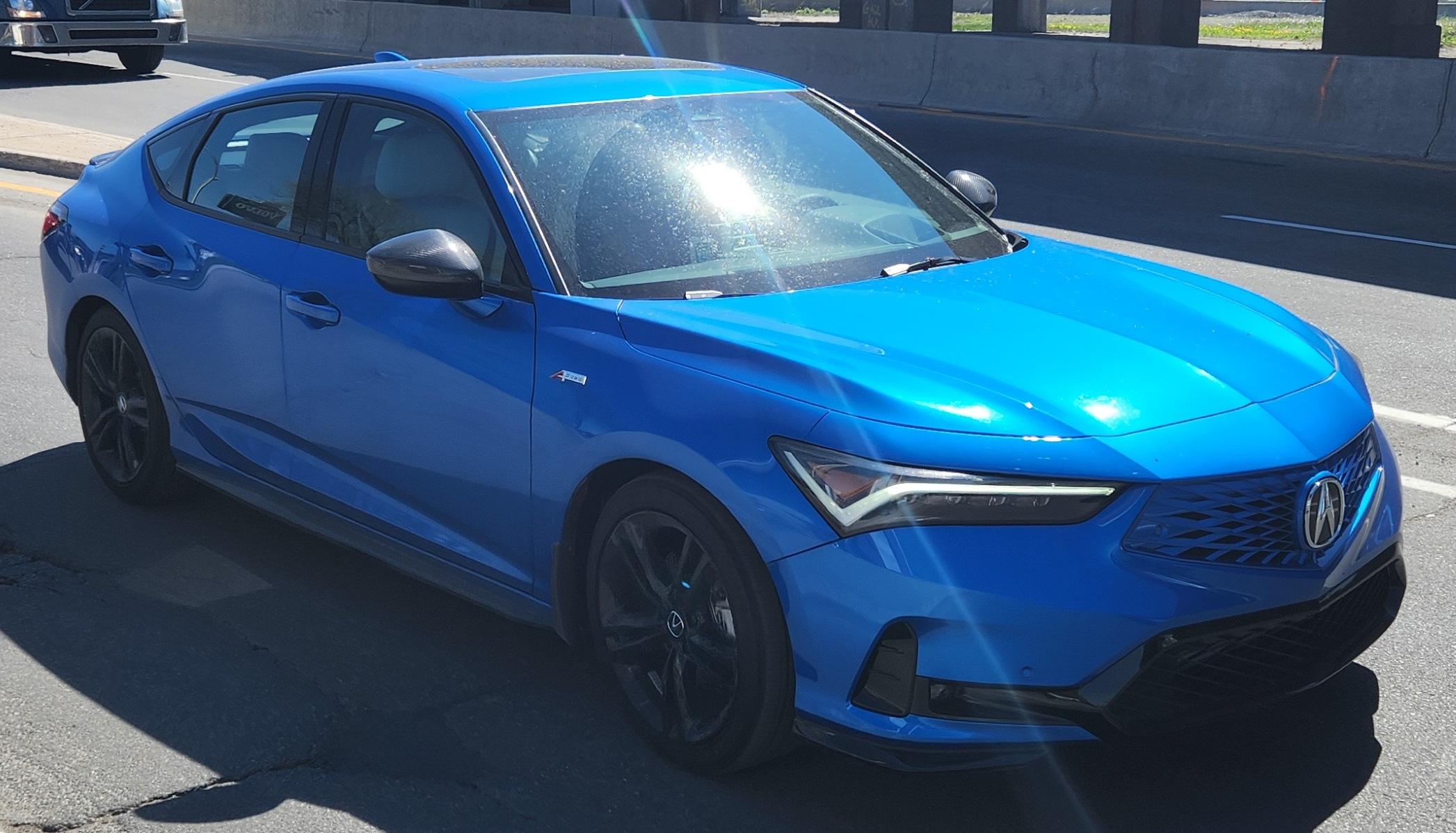
2026 Integra A-Spec

== Type S (DE5) ==
The Integra Type S (DE5 model code) was revealed on April 11, 2023. It shares key internal components with the FL5 Civic Type R, including the 2.0-liter turbocharged K20C1 inline-4 gasoline engine, four-piston Brembo brakes and 6-speed manual transmission – it cannot be ordered with an automatic gearbox. It also shares the wider tracks of that model, which required the addition of fender flares.

Acura's official information states that the K20C8 engine of the Type S (identical in all aspects to the K20C1 with the exception of the mounting points) produces 320 hp (239 kW; 324 PS) at 6,500 rpm and 310 lb⋅ft (420 N⋅m) between 2,600 and 4,000 rpm, which is 5 hp higher and the same torque compared to the Honda. It also has the same dual-axis front suspension setup as the Civic Type R that is meant to quell torque steer. Adaptive dampers, which are also available in the Integra A-Spec, are adjusted based on drive-mode selection, which in the Type S consists of Comfort, Sport, and Sport+. The brakes were upgraded with larger discs on the front and rear.

The Integra Type S will be sold in Japan starting 2026, which is imported from the United States and in unchanged left-hand drive configuration.

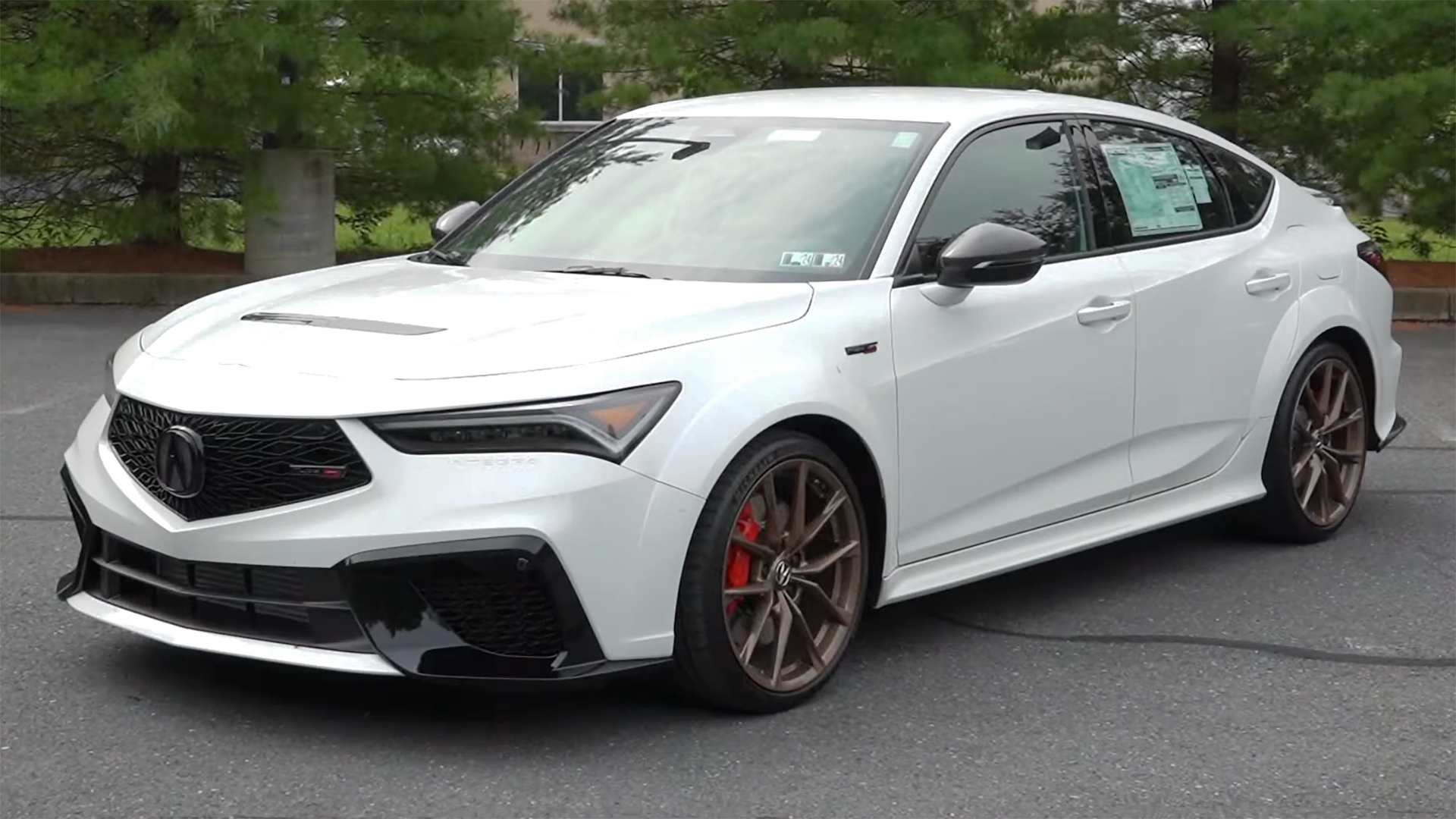
2024 Integra Type S

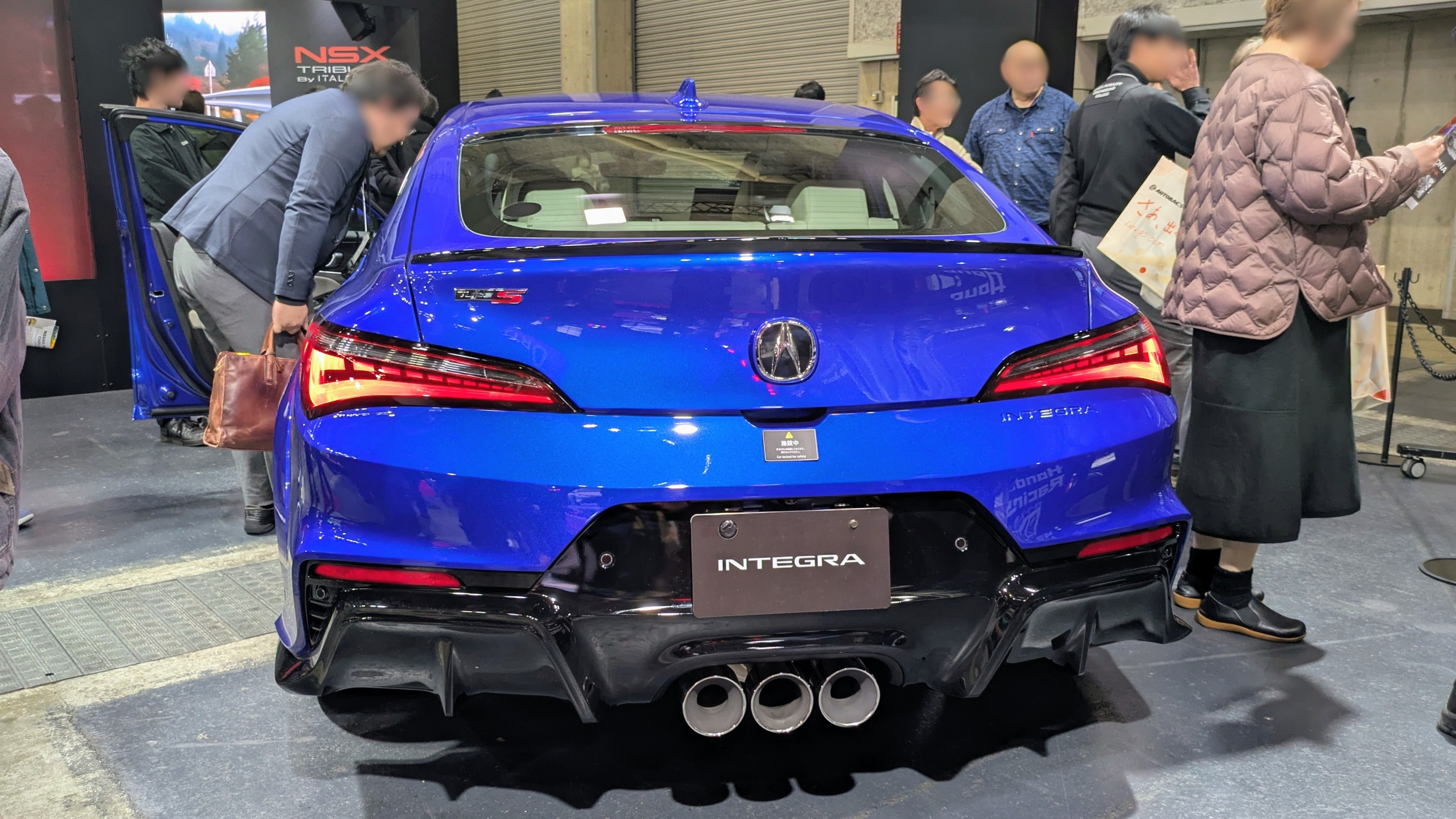
Rear view

== Safety ==
The 2023 Integra was awarded "Top Safety Pick +" by IIHS.

IIHS scores
Small overlap front (driver)	Good
Small overlap front (passenger)	Good
Moderate overlap front (original test)	Good
Moderate overlap front (updated test)	Acceptable
Side (original test)	Good
Side (updated test)	Good
Roof strength	Good
Head restraints and seats	Good
Headlights	Acceptable
Front crash prevention: vehicle-to-vehicle	Superior
Front crash prevention: vehicle-to-pedestrian (Day)	Superior
Front crash prevention: vehicle-to-pedestrian (Night)	Superior
Seat belt reminders	Marginal
Child seat anchors (LATCH) ease of use	Acceptable

== Awards ==
The Integra won the North American Car of the Year award for 2023. It was also one of seven finalists for the 2023 Motor Trend Car of the Year award. The Acura Integra Type S was included in Car and Driver's 10Best list for 2024. Road & Track named the Integra Type S their Performance Car of the Year under $100,000 for 2024.

== Sales ==
Calendar year	North America
2022	13,027
2023	32,090
2024	24,398
2025	20,178

== Motorsport ==
The Acura Integra Type-S DE5 at Indianapolis Motor Speedway.

In 2023, Honda Performance Development (HPD) unveiled the Integra Type S DE5 race car designed for the TCX class of the TC America Series. This model is similar to the road-going version, with changes in the form of a ventilated composite hood, an adjustable rear wing, 18-inch forged wheels and upgraded suspension. Improvements to the powertrain include new engine mounts, a Motec M1 ECU and a turbo back exhaust. The turbocharged, 2.0-liter four-cylinder K20C8 produces 360 horsepower (270 kW) and 340 lb-ft of torque. In the 2024 TC America Series, the car took its first victory at Virginia International Raceway, in the hands of Celso Neto.
