= 2024 TC America Series =

The 2024 TC America Series Powered by Skip Barber Racing School was the sixth season of the TC America Series. The season began at Sonoma on April 5, 2024, and ended at Indianapolis on October 6.

== Calendar ==
The preliminary calendar was released on July 1, 2023, featuring 14 races across seven rounds. On July 17, the VIR round was moved from June 15–16 to July 19–21, to avoid a clash with the 24 Hours of Le Mans. An additional change was announced on September 7, with Barber Motorsports Park returning to the schedule for the first time since 2016 and Sebring replaced NOLA Motorsports Park.

Round	Circuit	Date
1	(United States) Sonoma Raceway, Sonoma, California	April 5–7
2	(United States) Sebring International Raceway, Sebring, Florida	May 3–5
3	(United States) Circuit of the Americas, Austin, Texas	May 17–19
4	(United States) Virginia International Raceway, Alton, Virginia	July 19–21
5	(United States) Road America, Elkhart Lake, Wisconsin	August 16–18
6	(United States) Barber Motorsports Park, Birmingham, Alabama	September 6–8
7	(United States) Indianapolis Motor Speedway, Indianapolis, Indiana	October 5–8

== Entry list ==
Team	Car	No.	Drivers	Rounds
TCX entries
(United States) LA Honda World Racing	Acura Integra Type S TCX	7	(United States) Mario Biundo	1, 3
(United States) LA Honda World Racing	Acura Integra Type S TCX	73	(United States) Mike Lamarra	1, 3
(United States) Rigid Speed Company	BMW M2 CS Racing	16	(United States) Joseph Catania	1–3
(United States) Rigid Speed Company	BMW M2 CS Racing	17	(United States) Lucas Catania	1–3
(United States) Kaplan Racing Systems	BMW M2 CS Racing	18	(United States) Aaron Kaplan	1–3, 5–7
(United States) Skip Barber Racing School	Acura Integra Type S TCX	19	(United States) Cooper Broll	All
(United States) Skip Barber Racing School	Acura Integra Type S TCX	22	(Brazil) Celso Neto	All
(United States) Fast Track Racing	BMW M2 CS Racing	23	(United States) Cameron Stellar	7
(United States) Fast Track Racing	BMW M2 CS Racing	29	(United States) Nick Roberts	3
(United States) Racers Edge Motorsports	Acura Integra Type S TCX	39	(United States) Christopher DeFreitas	1–2, 4–7
(United States) Carrus Callas Raceteam	BMW M2 CS Racing	104	(United States) Chris Walsh	All
TC entries
(United States) DRS	Honda Civic Type-R TC	11	(United States) Kris Valdez	1, 3, 7
(United States) MINI JCW Team	Mini JCW Pro TC	37	(United States) Cristian Perocarpi	All
(United States) MINI JCW Team	Mini JCW Pro TC	66	(United States) Scott Thomson	All
(United States) FTG Racing	Mazda 3	71	(United States) Joey Jordan	1–4
(United States) Ricca Autosport	Hyundai Elantra N TC	75	(Canada) Connor Attrell	5, 7
(United States) Ricca Autosport	Hyundai Elantra N TC	76	(United States) Ron Zaras	4, 6
(United States) Ricca Autosport	Hyundai Elantra N TC	76	(United States) Vin Anatra	5, 7
(United States) Ricca Autosport	Hyundai Elantra N TC	77	(Puerto Rico) Ruben Iglesias Jr	1–5
(United States) Ricca Autosport	Hyundai Elantra N TC	77	(United States) Ron Zaras	7
(United States) Ricca Autosport	Hyundai Elantra N TC	78	(United States) Jeff Ricca	All
(United States) Ricca Autosport	Hyundai Elantra N TC	780	(United States) Sally McNulty	All
(United States) HART Alabama	Honda Civic Type-R TC	93	(United States) Karl Hertel	2
TCA entries
(United States) Ascent Racing	Honda Civic Si (FE1)	9	(Canada) Maddy Lemke	1–4, 6
(United States) Skip Barber Racing School	Honda Civic Si (FE1)	14	(United States) Alex Garcia	2–7
(United States) MINI JCW Team	Mini JCW	62	(Canada) P.J. Groenke	All
(United States) MINI JCW Team	Mini JCW	63	(United States) Alan Grossberg	2–4
(United States) MINI JCW Team	Mini JCW	63	(United States) Bruce Myrehn	5, 7
(United States) MINI JCW Team	Mini JCW	64	(Canada) Alain Lauziere	7
(United States) MINI JCW Team	Mini JCW	65	(United States) Andy Sellers	7
(United States) HART Alabama	Honda Civic Si (FE1)	93	(United States) Karl Hertel	6

== Race results ==
Bold indicates overall winner

Round		Circuit	Pole position	TCX Winners	TC Winners	TCA Winners	Results
1	R1	(United States) Sonoma	(United States) #17 Rigid Speed Company	(United States) #104 Carrus Callas Raceteam	(United States) #78 Ricca Autosport	(United States) #62 MINI JCW Team	Report
1	R1	(United States) Sonoma	(United States) Lucas Catania	(United States) Chris Walsh	(United States) Jeff Ricca	(Canada) P.J. Groenke	Report
1	R2	(United States) Sonoma		(United States) #104 Carrus Callas Raceteam	(United States) #77 Ricca Autosport	(United States) #62 MINI JCW Team	Report
1	R2	(United States) Sonoma		(United States) Chris Walsh	(Puerto Rico) Ruben Iglesias Jr	(Canada) P.J. Groenke	Report
2	R1	(United States) Sebring	(United States) #104 Carrus Callas Raceteam	(United States) #104 Carrus Callas Raceteam	(United States) #78 Ricca Autosport	(United States) #62 MINI JCW Team	Report
2	R1	(United States) Sebring	(United States) Chris Walsh	(United States) Chris Walsh	(United States) Jeff Ricca	(Canada) P.J. Groenke	Report
2	R2	(United States) Sebring		(United States) #104 Carrus Callas Raceteam	(United States) #78 Ricca Autosport	(United States) #14 Skip Barber Racing School	Report
2	R2	(United States) Sebring		(United States) Chris Walsh	(United States) Jeff Ricca	(United States) Alex Garcia	Report
3	R1	(United States) Austin	(United States) #104 Carrus Callas Raceteam	(United States) #104 Carrus Callas Raceteam	(United States) #78 Ricca Autosport	(United States) #62 MINI JCW Team	Report
3	R1	(United States) Austin	(United States) Chris Walsh	(United States) Chris Walsh	(United States) Jeff Ricca	(Canada) P.J. Groenke	Report
3	R2	(United States) Austin		(United States) #104 Carrus Callas Raceteam	(United States) #77 Ricca Autosport	(United States) #14 Skip Barber Racing School	Report
3	R2	(United States) Austin		(United States) Chris Walsh	(Puerto Rico) Ruben Iglesias Jr	(United States) Alex Garcia	Report
4	R1	(United States) Virginia	(United States) #104 Carrus Callas Raceteam	(United States) #22 Skip Barber Racing School	(United States) #78 Ricca Autosport	(United States) #14 Skip Barber Racing School	Report
4	R1	(United States) Virginia	(United States) Chris Walsh	(Brazil) Celso Neto	(United States) Jeff Ricca	(United States) Alex Garcia	Report
4	R2	(United States) Virginia		(United States) #104 Carrus Callas Raceteam	(United States) #37 MINI JCW Team	(United States) #14 Skip Barber Racing School	Report
4	R2	(United States) Virginia		(United States) Chris Walsh	(United States) Cristian Perocarpi	(United States) Alex Garcia	Report
5	R1	(United States) Road America	(United States) #22 Skip Barber Racing School	(United States) #22 Skip Barber Racing School	(United States) #37 MINI JCW Team	(United States) #62 MINI JCW Team	Report
5	R1	(United States) Road America	(Brazil) Celso Neto	(Brazil) Celso Neto	(United States) Cristian Perocarpi	(Canada) P.J. Groenke	Report
5	R2	(United States) Road America		(United States) #22 Skip Barber Racing School	(United States) #37 MINI JCW Team	(United States) #62 MINI JCW Team	Report
5	R2	(United States) Road America		(Brazil) Celso Neto	(United States) Cristian Perocarpi	(Canada) P.J. Groenke	Report
6	R1	(United States) Barber	(United States) #104 Carrus Callas Raceteam	(United States) #104 Carrus Callas Raceteam	(United States) #76 Ricca Autosport	(United States) #62 MINI JCW Team	Report
6	R1	(United States) Barber	(United States) Chris Walsh	(United States) Chris Walsh	(United States) Jeff Ricca	(Canada) P.J. Groenke	Report
6	R2	(United States) Barber		(United States) #22 Skip Barber Racing School	(United States) #76 Ricca Autosport	(United States) #93 HART Alabama	Report
6	R2	(United States) Barber		(Brazil) Celso Neto	(United States) Jeff Ricca	(United States) Karl Hertel	Report
7	R1	(United States) Indianapolis	(United States) #22 Skip Barber Racing School	(United States) #22 Skip Barber Racing School	(United States) #78 Ricca Autosport	(United States) #62 MINI JCW Team	Report
7	R1	(United States) Indianapolis	(Brazil) Celso Neto	(Brazil) Celso Neto	(United States) Jeff Ricca	(Canada) P.J. Groenke	Report
7	R2	(United States) Indianapolis		(United States) #22 Skip Barber Racing School	(United States) #75 Ricca Autosport	(United States) #14 Skip Barber Racing School	Report
7	R2	(United States) Indianapolis		(Brazil) Celso Neto	(Canada) Connor Attrell	(United States) Alex Garcia	Report

== Championship standings ==
Scoring system

Championship points are awarded for the first ten positions in each race. Entries are required to complete 75% of the winning car's race distance in order to be classified and earn points.

Position	**1st**	**2nd**	**3rd**	**4th**	**5th**	**6th**	**7th**	**8th**	**9th**	**10th**
Points	25	18	15	12	10	8	6	4	2	1

=== Drivers' championship ===
Pos.	Driver	Team	SON (United States)		SEB (United States)		AUS (United States)		VIR (United States)		ELK (United States)		BAR (United States)		IMS (United States)		Points
Pos.	Driver	Team	RD1	RD2	RD1	RD2	RD1	RD2	RD1	RD2	RD1	RD2	RD1	RD2	RD1	RD2	Points
TCX
1	(United States) Chris Walsh	(United States) Carrus Callas Raceteam	**1**	**1**	**1**	**1**	**1**	**1**	**2**	**1**	2	2	**1**	2	2	2	308
2	(Brazil) Celso Neto	(United States) Skip Barber Racing School	3	4	3	4	18	3	1	2	**1**	**1**	2	**1**	**1**	**1**	259
3	(United States) Cooper Broll	(United States) Skip Barber Racing School	5	6	7	11	Ret	5	5	5	7	11	3	7	12	4	146
4	(United States) Aaron Kaplan	(United States) Kaplan Racing Systems	7	7	5	3	3	4			Ret	WD	4	3	4	5	113
5	(United States) Lucas Catania	(United States) Rigid Speed Company	2	2	2	2	2	2									108
6	(United States) Christopher DeFreitas	(United States) Racers Edge Motorsports	9	10	8	Ret	6	7	Ret	WD	9	6	9	5	10	6	107
7	(United States) Joseph Catania	(United States) Rigid Speed Company	6	5	4	10	DNS	WD									40
8	(United States) Mike Lamarra	(United States) LA Honda World Racing	4	3			4	DNS									39
9	(United States) Cameron Steller	(United States) Fast Track Racing													3	3	30
10	(United States) Mario Biundo	(United States) LA Honda World Racing	16	13			10	6									18
11	(United States) Nick Roberts	(United States) Fast Track Racing					5	Ret									10
TC
1	(United States) Jeff Ricca	(United States) Ricca Autosport	8	18	6	5	7	Ret	3	4	4	4	5	4	5	18	266
2	(United States) Cristian Perocarpi	(United States) MINI JCW Team	DNS	14	9	7	19	10	4	3	3	3	6	Ret	Ret	19	179
3	(United States) Sally McNulty	(United States) Ricca Autosport	10	11	11	8	11	11	9	12	5	5	7	6	11	11	178
4	(Puerto Rico) Ruben Iglesias Jr.	(United States) Ricca Autosport	13	8	10	6	8	8	6	6	Ret	WD					141
5	(United States) Scott Thomson	(United States) MINI JCW Team	14	15	13	12	12	16	8	7	6	8	8	8	Ret	10	135
6	(United States) Joey Jordan	(United States) FTG Racing	11	9	12	9	9	9	DNS	DNS							86
7	(United States) Kris Valdez	(United States) DRS	12	12			13	17	11	DNS					9	12	58
8	(United States) Ron Zaras	(United States) Ricca Autosport							7	8					7	8	55
9	(Canada) Connor Attrell	(United States) Ricca Autosport									10	Ret			6	7	51
10	(United States) Vin Anatra	(United States) Ricca Autosport									8	7			8	9	49
TCA
1	(Canada) P.J. Groenke	(United States) MINI JCW Team	15	16	14	14	14	13	12	10	11	9	10	10	14	13	308
2	(United States) Alex Garcia	(United States) Skip Barber Racing School			DNS	13	15	12	10	9	13	Ret	11	11	13	14	209
3	(Canada) Maddy Lemke	(United States) Ascent Racing	17	17	15	15	16	14	WD	WD							99
4	(United States) Alan Grossberg	(United States) MINI JCW Team			16	16	17	15	Ret	11							66
5	(United States) Bruce Myrehn	(United States) MINI JCW Team									12	10			16	15	63
6	(United States) Karl Hertel	(United States) HART Alabama											12	9			40
7	(Canada) Alain Lauziere	(United States) MINI JCW Team													15	16	27
8	(United States) Andy Sellers	(United States) MINI JCW Team													17	17	20
Pos.	Driver	Team	SON (United States)		SEB (United States)		AUS (United States)		VIR (United States)		ELK (United States)		BAR (United States)		IMS (United States)		Points

Key
Colour	Result
Gold	Race winner
Silver	2nd place
Bronze	3rd place
Green	Points finish
Blue	Non-points finish
Blue	Non-classified finish (NC)
Purple	Did not finish (Ret)
Black	Disqualified (DSQ)
Black	Excluded (EX)
White	Did not start (DNS)
White	Race cancelled (C)
White	Withdrew (WD)
Blank	Did not participate

**Bold** – Pole

Italics – Fastest Lap

== See also ==
- 2024 TC France Series
