= 2021 GT America Series =

Car racing series

The 2021 GT America Series was the inaugural season of the SRO Motorsports Group's GT America Series, an auto racing series for grand tourer cars. The races were contested with GT2-spec, GT3-spec and GT4-spec cars. The season began at Sonoma on March 6, and ended at Indianapolis on October 17.

== Calendar ==
The final calendar was released on October 26, 2020.

Round	Circuit	Date
1	(United States) Sonoma Raceway, Sonoma, California	March 6–7
2	(United States) Circuit of the Americas, Elroy, Texas	May 1–2
3	(United States) Virginia International Raceway, Alton, Virginia	June 5–6
4	(United States) Nashville Street Circuit, Nashville, Tennessee	August 7–8
5	(United States) Road America, Elkhart Lake, Wisconsin	August 28–29
6	(United States) Watkins Glen International Watkins Glen, New York	September 18–19
7	(United States) Sebring International Raceway Sebring, Florida	October 1–3
8	(United States) Indianapolis Motor Speedway, Indianapolis, Indiana	October 17

Also part of the Intercontinental GT Challenge
Denotes invitational-only rounds which do not count for points.

== Entry list ==
Team	Car	No.	Drivers	Class		Rounds
Team	Car	No.	Drivers	Car	Driver	Rounds
(United States) Notlad Racing by RS1	Aston Martin Vantage AMR GT4	00	(United States) Matt Dalton	GT4	GT	1–3
(United States) CrowdStrike/ DXDT Racing	Mercedes-AMG GT3 Evo	04	(United States) George Kurtz	GT3	OV	1–5, 8
(United States) CrowdStrike/ DXDT Racing	Mercedes-AMG GT3 Evo	58	(United States) C.J. Moses	GT3	OV	2–6, 8
(United States) CrowdStrike/ DXDT Racing	Mercedes-AMG GT3 Evo	63	(United States) David Askew	GT3	OV	4
(United States) GMG Racing	Audi R8 LMS GT4 Evo	07	(United States) Jason Nolan	GT4	GT	2
(United States) GMG Racing	Audi R8 LMS GT4 Evo	8	(United States) Elias Sabo	GT4	GT	1–2
(United States) GMG Racing	Audi R8 LMS GT2	8	(United States) Elias Sabo	GT2	INV	4, 7–8
(United States) GMG Racing	Aston Martin Vantage AMR GT4	2	(United States) Jason Bell	GT4	GT	All
(United States) GMG Racing	Lamborghini Huracán GT3 Evo	14	(United States) James Sofronas	GT3	OV	2
(United States) GMG Racing	Audi R8 LMS Ultra	14	(United States) James Sofronas	GT3	OV	4–5
(United States) GMG Racing	Porsche 911 GT3 R	32	(United States) Kyle Washington	GT3	OV	1–5, 8
(United States) Automatic Racing	Aston Martin Vantage AMR GT4	09	(United States) Paul Kiebler	GT4	GT	5–7
(United States) Dexter Racing	Ginetta G55 GT4	060	(United States) Matt Rivard	GT4	INV	6
(United States) Dexter Racing	Ginetta G56 GT4	60	(United States) Matt Rivard	GT4	GT	7–8
(United States) TR3 Racing	Lamborghini Huracán GT3 Evo	10	(United States) John Megrue	GT3	OV	5–7
(United States) TR3 Racing	Lamborghini Huracán Super Trofeo Evo	90	(United States) Caesar Bacarella	INV	INV	6
(United States) Classic BMW	BMW M4 GT4	11	(United States) Philip Bloom	GT4	GT	1–3
(United States) Classic BMW	BMW M4 GT4	11	(United States) Mark Brummond	GT4	GT	4
(United States) Capstone Motorsports	Mercedes-AMG GT4	16	(United States) John Allen	GT4	GT	5, 7
(United States) TGR Forbush Performance	Toyota GR Supra GT4	18	(United States) Matt Forbush	GT4	GT	4
(Belgium) EMG Motorsport	Saleen 1 GT4 Cup	21	(United States) Zoey Edenholm	GT4	INV	3
(Belgium) EMG Motorsport	Saleen 1 GT4 Cup	112	(United States) Dominic Starkweather	GT4	INV	3
(United States) Heart Of Racing Team	Aston Martin Vantage AMR GT4	25	(United States) Gray Newell	GT4	GT	All
(United States) Prive Motorsports / Topp Racing	McLaren 570S GT4	26	(United States) Thomas Surgent	GT4	GT	2–4, 6, 8
(United States) Daskalos Motorsports	Audi R8 LMS ultra	27	(United States) Jason Daskalos	GT3	OV	1–5, 7
(United States) Rearden Racing	Lamborghini Huracán GT3	29	(Russia) Dmitri Novikov	GT3	MT	1
(United States) Rearden Racing	Lamborghini Huracán GT3 Evo	191	(United States) Jeff Burton	GT3	MT	All
(United States) Rearden Racing	Audi R8 LMS GT4	888	(United States) Kris McCoy	GT4	GT	1
(United States) RENNtech Motorsports	Mercedes-AMG GT4	39	(United States) Chris Cagnazzi	GT4	GT	2–5, 7–8
(United States) RENNtech Motorsports	Mercedes-AMG GT4	79	(United States) Christopher Gumprecht	GT4	GT	3, 5–8
(United States) RENNtech Motorsports	Mercedes-AMG GT4	89	(United States) Ross Chouest	GT4	GT	1–5
(United States) Wright Motorsports	Porsche 911 GT3 R	45	(United States) Charlie Luck	GT3	MT	1–6, 8
(United States) Nolasport	Porsche Cayman GT4 Clubsport MR	49	(United States) Jason Hall	GT4	GT	1
(United States) Nolasport	Porsche Cayman GT4 Clubsport MR	49	(United States) Scott Noble	GT4	GT	5–8
(United States) 3R Povoledo Racing	Aston Martin Vantage AMR GT4	50	(United States) Ross Chouest	GT4	GT	6–7
(United States) Black Swan Racing	Porsche Cayman GT4 Clubsport MR	54	(United States) Tim Pappas	GT4	GT	1–3, 5, 7
(United States) Scuderia Corsa	Ferrari 488 GT3 Evo 2020	62	(United States) Bret Curtis	GT3	OV	4
(United States) TRG - The Racer's Group	Porsche 718 Cayman GT4 Clubsport	66	(United States) Derek DeBoer	GT4	GT	4
(Canada) ST Racing	Porsche 718 Cayman GT4 Clubsport	69	(United States) Dan Miller	GT4	GT	1
(United Kingdom) Inception Racing with Optimum Motorsport	McLaren 720S GT3	70	(United States) Brendan Iribe	GT3	OV	2–5, 6, 8
(United States) ROTR Motorsport	Audi R8 LMS GT4 Evo	76	(United States) Alex Welch	GT4	GT	1–6, 8
(Canada) Compass Racing	Acura NSX GT3 Evo	77	(Mexico) Rodrigo Sales	GT3	OV	7
(United States) Zelus Motorsports	Lamborghini Huracán GT3 Evo	88	(United States) Jason Harward	GT3	OV	All
(United States) Zelus Motorsports	Aston Martin Vantage AMR GT4	888	(Australia) Sean Whalen	GT4	GT	6, 8
(United States) Random Vandals Racing	BMW M4 GT4	98	(United States) Paul Sparta	GT4	GT	4
(United States) Rotek Racing	Ford Mustang GT4	99	(United States) Robb Holland	GT4	GT	All
(United States) TKO Motorsports with Flying Lizard	Bentley Continental GT3	101	(Mexico) Memo Gidley	GT3	OV	5, 7–8
(United States) Stephen Cameron Racing	BMW M4 GT4	119	(Australia) Sean Quinlan	GT4	GT	All
(United States) Stephen Cameron Racing	Porsche 718 Cayman GT4 Clubsport	619	(United States) Alain Stad	GT4	GT	2–3, 5–7
(United States) Premier Sportscar	Porsche 718 Cayman GT4 Clubsport	120	(United States) Adam Adelson	GT4	GT	1–7
(United States) TPC Racing	Lamborghini Huracán Super Trofeo GT2	381	(United States) Scott Schmidt	GT2	INV	2
(United States) Flying Lizard Motorsports	Porsche 911 GT3 R (2017)	460	(United States) Andy Wilzoch	GT3	MT	2, 5–8
(United States) CarBahn Motorsports with Peregrine Racing	Audi R8 LMS GT4 Evo	930	(United States) Sameer Ghandi	GT4	GT	7
(United States) RecStuff Racing	Mercedes-AMG GT4	999	(United States) Jeff Courtney	GT4	GT	2

Icon	Class
Car
GT2	GT2 Cars
GT3	GT3 Current-Gen Cars
GT3	GT3 Previous-Gen Cars
GT4	GT4 Cars
Drivers
OV	Overall
MT	Masters
GT	GT4
INV	Invitational

== Race results ==
Bold indicates overall winner.

Round		Circuit	Pole position	Overall winners	Masters Winners	GT2 Winners	GT4 Winners	Invitational Winners
1	R1	(United States) Sonoma	(United States) No. 04 CrowdStrike / DXDT Racing	**(United States) No. 04 CrowdStrike / DXDT Racing**	(United States) No. 45 Wright Motorsports	No Entries	(United States) No. 119 Stephen Cameron Racing	No Entries
1	R1	(United States) Sonoma	(United States) George Kurtz	(United States) **George Kurtz**	(United States) Charlie Luck	No Entries	(United States) Sean Quinlan	No Entries
1	R2	(United States) Sonoma		**(United States) No. 04 CrowdStrike / DXDT Racing**	(United States) No. 45 Wright Motorsports	No Entries	(United States) No. 99 Rotek Racing	No Entries
1	R2	(United States) Sonoma		(United States) **George Kurtz**	(United States) Charlie Luck	No Entries	(United States) Robb Holland	No Entries
2	R1	(United States) Austin	(United States) No. 14 GMG Racing	**(United States) No. 14 GMG Racing**	(United States) No. 460 Flying Lizard Motorsports	No Entries	(United States) No. 89 RENNtech Motorsports	(United States) No. 381 TPC Racing
2	R1	(United States) Austin	(United States) James Sofronas	**(United States) James Sofronas**	(United States) Andy Wilzoch	No Entries	(United States) Ross Chouest	(United States) Scott Schmidt
2	R2	(United States) Austin		**(United Kingdom) No. 70 Inception Racing with Optimum Motorsport**	(United States) No. 45 Wright Motorsports	No Entries	(United States) No. 119 Stephen Cameron Racing	(United States) No. 381 TPC Racing
2	R2	(United States) Austin		**(United States) Brendan Iribe**	(United States) Charlie Luck	No Entries	(United States) Sean Quinlan	(United States) Scott Schmidt
3	R1	(United States) Virginia	(United States) No. 45 Wright Motorsports	**(United States) No. 45 Wright Motorsports**	(United States) No. 45 Wright Motorsports	No Entries	(United States) No. 119 Stephen Cameron Racing	(Belgium) No. 21 EMG Motorsport
3	R1	(United States) Virginia	(United States) Charlie Luck	**(United States) Charlie Luck**	(United States) Charlie Luck	No Entries	(United States) Sean Quinlan	(United States) Zoey Edenholm
3	R2	(United States) Virginia		**(United Kingdom) No. 70 Inception Racing with Optimum Motorsport**	(United States) No. 45 Wright Motorsports	No Entries	(United States) No. 119 Stephen Cameron Racing	(Belgium) No. 112 EMG Motorsport
3	R2	(United States) Virginia		**(United States) Brendan Iribe**	(United States) Charlie Luck	No Entries	(United States) Sean Quinlan	(United States) Dominic Starkweather
4	R1	(United States) Nashville	(United States) No. 14 GMG Racing	**(United States) No. 14 GMG Racing**	(United States) No. 191 Rearden Racing	(United States) No. 8 GMG Racing	(United States) No. 76 ROTR Motorsport	No Entries
4	R1	(United States) Nashville	(United States) James Sofronas	**(United States) James Sofronas**	(United States) Jeff Burton	(United States) Elias Sabo	(United States) Alex Welch	No Entries
4	R2	(United States) Nashville		**(United States) No. 62 Scuderia Corsa**	(United States) No. 191 Rearden Racing	No Finishers	(United States) No. 39 RENNtech Motorsports	No Entries
4	R2	(United States) Nashville		**(United States) Bret Curtis**	(United States) Jeff Burton	No Finishers	(United States) Chris Cagnazzi	No Entries
5	R1	(United States) Road America	(United States) No. 14 GMG Racing	**(United States) No. 14 GMG Racing**	(United States) No. 45 Wright Motorsports	No Entries	(United States) No. 119 Stephen Cameron Racing	No Entries
5	R1	(United States) Road America	(United States) James Sofronas	**(United States) James Sofronas**	(United States) Charlie Luck	No Entries	(United States) Sean Quinlan	No Entries
5	R2	(United States) Road America		**(United States) No. 460 Flying Lizard Motorsports**	(United States) No. 460 Flying Lizard Motorsports	No Entries	(United States) No. 119 Stephen Cameron Racing	No Entries
5	R2	(United States) Road America		**(United States) Andy Wilzoch**	(United States) Andy Wilzoch	No Entries	(United States) Sean Quinlan	No Entries
6	R1	(United States) Watkins Glen	(United States) No. 45 Wright Motorsports	**(United States) No. 45 Wright Motorsports**	(United States) No. 45 Wright Motorsports	No Entries	(United States) No. 2 GMG Racing	(United States) No. 90 TR3 Racing
6	R1	(United States) Watkins Glen	(United States) Charlie Luck	**(United States) Charlie Luck**	(United States) Charlie Luck	No Entries	(United States) Jason Bell	(United States) Caesar Bacarella
6	R2	(United States) Watkins Glen		**(United States) No. 191 Rearden Racing**	**(United States)** No. 191 Rearden Racing	No Entries	(United States) No. 2 GMG Racing	(United States) No. 90 TR3 Racing
6	R2	(United States) Watkins Glen		**(United States) Jeff Burton**	**(United States)** Jeff Burton	No Entries	(United States) Jason Bell	(United States) Caesar Bacarella
7	R1	(United States) Sebring	(United States) No. 101 TKO Motorsports with Flying Lizard	**(United States) No. 101 TKO Motorsports with Flying Lizard**	(United States) No. 460 Flying Lizard Motorsports	(United States) No. 8 GMG Racing	(United States) No. 119 Stephen Cameron Racing	No Entries
7	R1	(United States) Sebring	(Mexico) Memo Gidley	**(Mexico) Memo Gidley**	(United States) Andy Wilzoch	(United States) Elias Sabo	(United States) Sean Quinlan	No Entries
7	R2	(United States) Sebring		**(United States) No. 101 TKO Motorsports with Flying Lizard**	(United States) No. 460 Flying Lizard Motorsports	(United States) No. 8 GMG Racing	(United States) No. 2 GMG Racing	No Entries
7	R2	(United States) Sebring		**(Mexico) Memo Gidley**	(United States) Andy Wilzoch	(United States) Elias Sabo	(United States) Jason Bell	No Entries
8	R1	(United States) Indianapolis	(United Kingdom) No. 70 Inception Racing	**(United Kingdom) No. 70 Inception Racing**	(United States) No. 45 Wright Motorsports	(United States) No. 8 GMG Racing	(United States) No. 2 GMG Racing	No Entries
8	R1	(United States) Indianapolis	(United States) Brendan Iribe	**(United States) Brendan Iribe**	(United States) Charlie Luck	(United States) Elias Sabo	(United States) Jason Bell	No Entries
8	R2	(United States) Indianapolis		**(United Kingdom) No. 70 Inception Racing**	(United States) No. 45 Wright Motorsports	(United States) No. 8 GMG Racing	(United States) No. 35 Heart of Racing Team	No Entries
8	R2	(United States) Indianapolis		**(United States) Brendan Iribe**	(United States) Charlie Luck	(United States) Elias Sabo	(United States) Gray Newell	No Entries

== Championship standings ==
Scoring system

Championship points are awarded for the first ten positions in each race. Entries are required to complete 75% of the winning car's race distance in order to be classified and earn points.

Position	1st	2nd	3rd	4th	5th	6th	7th	8th	9th	10th
Points	25	18	15	12	10	8	6	4	2	1

=== Drivers' championships ===
==== GT3 ====
Pos.	Driver	Masters	Team	SON (United States)		AUS (United States)		VIR (United States)		NSH (United States)		ELK (United States)		WGL (United States)		SEB (United States)		IND (United States)		Points
Pos.	Driver	Masters	Team	RD1	RD2	RD1	RD2	RD1	RD2	RD1	RD2	RD1	RD2	RD1	RD2	RD1	RD2	RD1	RD2	Points
1	(United States) Charlie Luck	MT	(United States) Wright Motorsports	2	2	7	3	1	2	3	7	3	Ret	1	4			2	3	209
2	(United States) Jeff Burton	MT	(United States) Rearden Racing	5	18	18	7	3	3	2	3	6	2	2	1	6	DNS	6	5	176
3	(United States) Jason Harward	OV	(United States) Zelus Motorsports	3	3	2	8	17	5	6	6	5	Ret	3	3	2	2	4	9	143
4	(United States) Brendan Iribe	OV	(United Kingdom) Inception Racing with Optimum Motorsport			4	1	2	1									1	1	130
5	(United States) James Sofronas	OV	(United States) GMG Racing			1	2			1	5	1	6							111
6	(United States) Kyle Washington	OV	(United States) GMG Racing	4	6	5	6	4	15	Ret	19	7	3					3	4	107
7	(United States) Andy Wilzoch	MT	(United States) Flying Lizard Motorsports			6	5					4	1	4	5	4	5	5	6	97
8	(United States) George Kurtz	OV	(United States) CrowdStrike / DXDT Racing	1	1	Ret	4	7	Ret	7	4	WD	WD							90
9	(United States) Jason Daskalos	OV	(United States) Daskalos Motorsports	Ret	4	3	Ret	15	Ret	4	2	8	4			5	4			79
10	(United States) CJ Moses	OV	(United States) CrowdStrike / DXDT Racing	DNS	DNS	DNS	9	5	4	8	8							8	8	46
11	(Mexico) Memo Gidley	OV	(United States) TKO Motorsports with Flying Lizard									2	Ret			1	1	9	2	40
12	(Mexico) Rodrigo Sales	OV	(Canada) Compass Racing													3	3			30
13	(United States) Bret Curtis	OV	(United States) Scuderia Corsa							19	1									29
14	(Russia) Dmitri Novikov	MT	(United States) Rearden Racing	12	5															18
15	(United States) John Megrue	MT	(United States) TR3 Racing									DNS	6	DNS	DNS					10
16	(United States) David Askew	MT	(United States) CrowdStrike / DXDT Racing							Ret	9									2
Pos.	Driver		Team	SON (United States)		AUS (United States)		VIR (United States)		NSH (United States)		ELK (United States)		WGL (United States)		SEB (United States)		IND (United States)		Points

==== GT2 ====
Pos.	Driver	Team	SON (United States)		AUS (United States)		VIR (United States)		NSH (United States)		ELK (United States)		WGL (United States)		SEB (United States)		IND (United States)		Points
Pos.	Driver	Team	RD1	RD2	RD1	RD2	RD1	RD2	RD1	RD2	RD1	RD2	RD1	RD2	RD1	RD2	RD1	RD2	Points
1	(United States) Elias Sabo	(United States) GMG Racing							5	Ret					7	6	7	7	75
Pos.	Driver	Team	SON (United States)		AUS (United States)		VIR (United States)		NSH (United States)		ELK (United States)		WGL (United States)		SEB (United States)		IND (United States)		Points

==== GT4 ====
Pos.	Driver	Team	SON (United States)		AUS (United States)		VIR (United States)		NSH (United States)		ELK (United States)		WGL (United States)		SEB (United States)		IND (United States)		Points
Pos.	Driver	Team	RD1	RD2	RD1	RD2	RD1	RD2	RD1	RD2	RD1	RD2	RD1	RD2	RD1	RD2	RD1	RD2	Points
1	(United States) Jason Bell	(United States) GMG Racing	8	10	9	13	8	10	15	14	11	7	5	6	9	DNS	10	11	230
2	(United States) Sean Quinlan	(United States) Stephen Cameron Racing	6	9	20	11	6	6	9	13	9	5	NC	10	8	16	12	Ret	217
3	(United States) Robb Holland	(United States) Rotek Racing	7	7	11	15	12	12	10	12	13	9	10	13			14	17	162
4	(United States) Alex Welch	(United States) ROTR Motorsport	17	14	16	16	10	7	9	11	14	10	11	9			17	12	146
5	(United States) Gray Newell	(United States) Heart of Racing Team	16	15	14	14	13	11	18	18	15	Ret	6	Ret	16	9	11	10	105
6	(United States) Chris Cagnazzi	(United States) RENNtech Motorsports			10	DNS	9	8	13	10	10	Ret			12	10	16	Ret	104
7	(United States) Ross Chouest	(United States) RENNtech Motorsports	15	17	8	12	11	9	DNS	DNS	17	Ret	8	7	10	Ret			102
8	(United States) Scott Noble	(United States) Nolasport									12	8			11	8	13	13	51
9	(United States) Christopher Gumprecht	(United States) RENNtech Motorsports					DNS	DNS			18	11	9	8	Ret	11	15	16	50
10	(United States) Adam Adelson	(United States) Premier Sportscar	9	11	13	Ret	Ret	DNS	14	15	19	13			15	13			50
11	(United States) Alain Stad	(United States) Stephen Cameron Racing			19	17	14	13			16	12	14	12	DNS	12			33
12	(United States) Phil Bloom	(United States) Classic BMW	10	8	DNS	DNS													28
13	(United States) Elias Sabo	(United States) GMG Racing	11	13	17	18													20
14	(United States) Tim Pappas	(United States) Black Swan Racing	Ret	12	12	DNS	DNS	Ret			DNS	DNS							18
15	(United States) Thomas Surgent	(United States) Prive Motorsports / Topp Racing			21	DNS			17	21			12	11			20	18	18
16	(Australia) Sean Whalen	(United States) Zelus Motorsports											13	15			18	15	15
17	(United States) Mark Brummond	(United States) Classic BMW							12	20									13
18	(United States) Matt Rivard	(United States) Dexter Racing													14	14	19	14	11
19	(United States) Matt Forbush	(United States) TGR Forbush Performance							16	16									10
20	(United States) Matt Dalton	(United States) Notlad Racing by RS1	13	16	DNS	Ret	Ret	DNS											7
21	(United States) Dan Miller	(Canada) ST Racing	14	19															4
21	(United States) Derek DeBoer	(United States) The Racer's Group							Ret	17									4
23	(United States) Paul Kiebler	(United States) Automatic Racing									NC	14	DNS	14	13	15			4
24	(United States) Jason Nolan	(United States) GMG Racing			DNS	19													2
25	(United States) Jeff Courtney	(United States) RecStuff Racing			DNS	DNS													0
26	(United States) Jason Hall	(United States) Nolasport	DNS	DNS															0
27	(United States) John Allen	(United States) Capstone Motorsports									DNS								0
28	(United States) Sameer Ghandi	(United States) CarBahn Motorsports with Peregrine Racing													DNS	DNS			0
Pos.	Driver	Team	SON (United States)		AUS (United States)		VIR (United States)		NSH (United States)		ELK (United States)		WGL (United States)		SEB (United States)		IND (United States)		Points
