= DXDT Racing =

American racing team

- Founded: 2014
- Founder(s): David Askew
- Base: Statesville, North Carolina
- Team principal(s): David Askew
- Current series: GT World Challenge America; IMSA WeatherTech SportsCar Championship
- Former series: TC America, GT America, Lamborghini Super Trofeo, Continental Tire Sports Car Challenge, NASA
- Teams' Championships: 1 (2020)
- Drivers' Championships: 2 (2016, 2020)
- Website: dxdtracing.com

DXDT Racing is a professional sports car team based in Statesville, North Carolina, founded by competitive off-shore sailor and businessman David Askew in 2014. With an early history in IMSA's Continental Tire SportsCar Challenge and Lamborghini Super Trofeo North America, the team now primarily races in SRO America's GT World Challenge America and the IMSA WeatherTech SportsCar Championship.

== NASA (2015-2016) ==
Originally based in Salt Lake City, Utah, DXDT Racing spent its early years at Miller Motorsport Park, now Utah Motorsport Campus, participating in the local National Auto Sport Association's club racing events. In the team's 2015, DXDT Racing competed in the GTSU and Spec Z class, earning a total of four wins and six podiums in eight races. The team returned for a second year in 2016, earning three wins and seven podiums in the GTSU, Spec Z, and TTB classes.

== Lamborghini Super Trofeo (2016-2017) ==
The 2017 season saw growth for the sports car racing team, with DXDT Racing jumping into professional race competition in the Lamborghini Blancpain Super Trofeo North America Series. In support of the IMSA WeatherTech SportsCar Championship, the series traveled to many of the big-name tracks in North America including WeatherTech Raceway Laguna Seca, Road America, and VIRginia International Raceway. Competing in the Pro/Am class, team owner David Askew was joined by James Burke, a NASA racer also from Utah. The pair also competed in a one-off doubleheader at Utah Motorsports Campus in the Pirelli World Challenge's SprintX Championship. Ross Chouest also joined in the Lamborghini Super Trofeo effort for the whole season in the LB Cup class, while future IMSA Champion Madison Snow participated in two races at WeatherTech Raceway Laguna Seca. The team finished fifth in the final season standings with 13 pole positions, 13 podiums, and nine wins.

The following season, DXDT Racing returned for a second year in the series with a multi-car effort. Austin Versteeg and Paul Terry led the team charge in their respective championships, finishing third in Pro/Am and LB Cup. Ross Chouest also returned for a sophomore season, finishing fourth in the season standings. Over the entirety of the season, the team ran six cars and finished fourth in the team standings with 16 podium finishes and eight wins.

== GT World Challenge America (2016-present) ==
After a one-weekend run in Pirelli World Challenge (Now GT World Challenge America) in 2016 with David Askew and James Burke, DXDT Racing participated in the Miller race weekend again in 2018 with David Askew and Arron Povoledo, earning a pair of seventh-place finishes. In 2018, the team participated in partial seasons both in the Sprint and SprintX divisions, racing Mercedes AMG GT3 Machinery. The sprint format consisted of shorter races and a one-driver format, while SprintX allowed two drivers to share a car, or for one bronze driver to run the whole race. David Askew counted for most of the entries that season, competing in six of ten double-headers. The team earned one win and ten podiums, finishing tenth in the team championship standings.

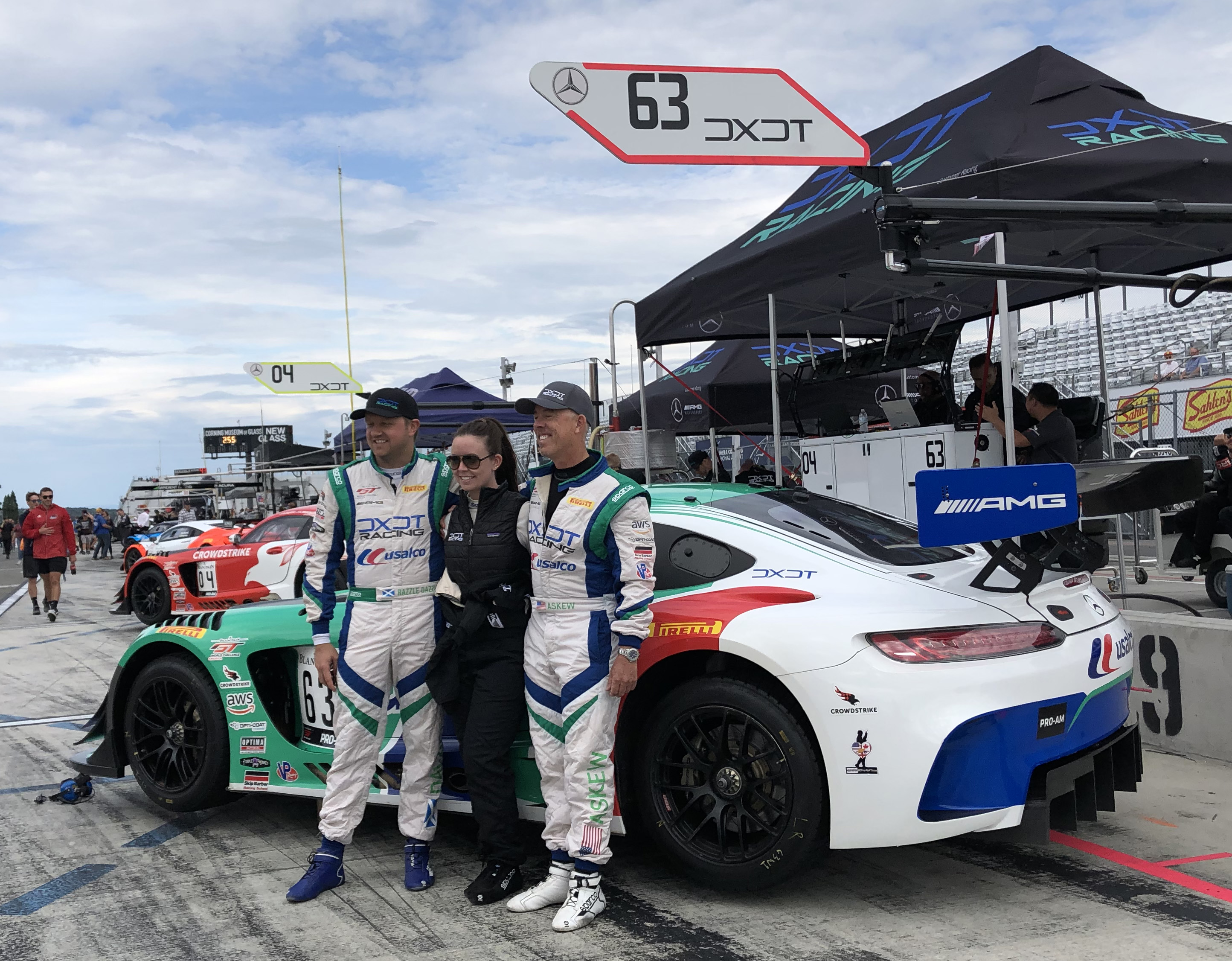
Co-Drivers Ryan Dalziel and David Askew in 2019

In 2019, the series changed to Blancpain GT World Challenge America with new series sponsorship. Crowdstrike Racing, owned by Crowdstrike CEO George Kurtz, partnered with DXDT for the 2018 season, beginning what would be a five-year relationship. Kurtz himself raced, running the No. 04 CrowdStrike/AWS/DXDT Mercedes AMG-GT3, partnering with regular co-driver Colin Braun. David Askew and Ryan Dalziel paired up in the No. 63 USALCO/Security National Mortgage Mercedes-AMG GT3, running Askew's first full season in the series. The pair had a challenging season, but still netted two of the team's four podium finishes. Kurtz and Braun secured the team's only win of the year in race two at Watkins Glen International.

The team more than doubled in 2020 with the addition of a TC America program, with drivers CJ Moses (TCR), Scott Smithson (TCR), and Kevin Boehm (TCA). Boehm drove and engineered his #9 Boehm Racing Honda Civic Si, earning six wins in the last eight races of the season. He earned the TC America championship in the TCA class his rookie season while Smithson and Moses finished third and fifth, respectively in the TCR class. In GT World Challenge America, the driver lineups stayed the same, with Kurtz and Braun sharing the No. 04 Mercedes while Askew and Dalziel commanded the No. 63. The pair of cars earned 15 podiums over the course of the season, with Kurtz and Bruan earning the team's three wins of the year at VIRginia International Raceway, Road America, and the finale event at the inaugural Indianapolis 8 Hour at Indianapolis Motor Speedway.

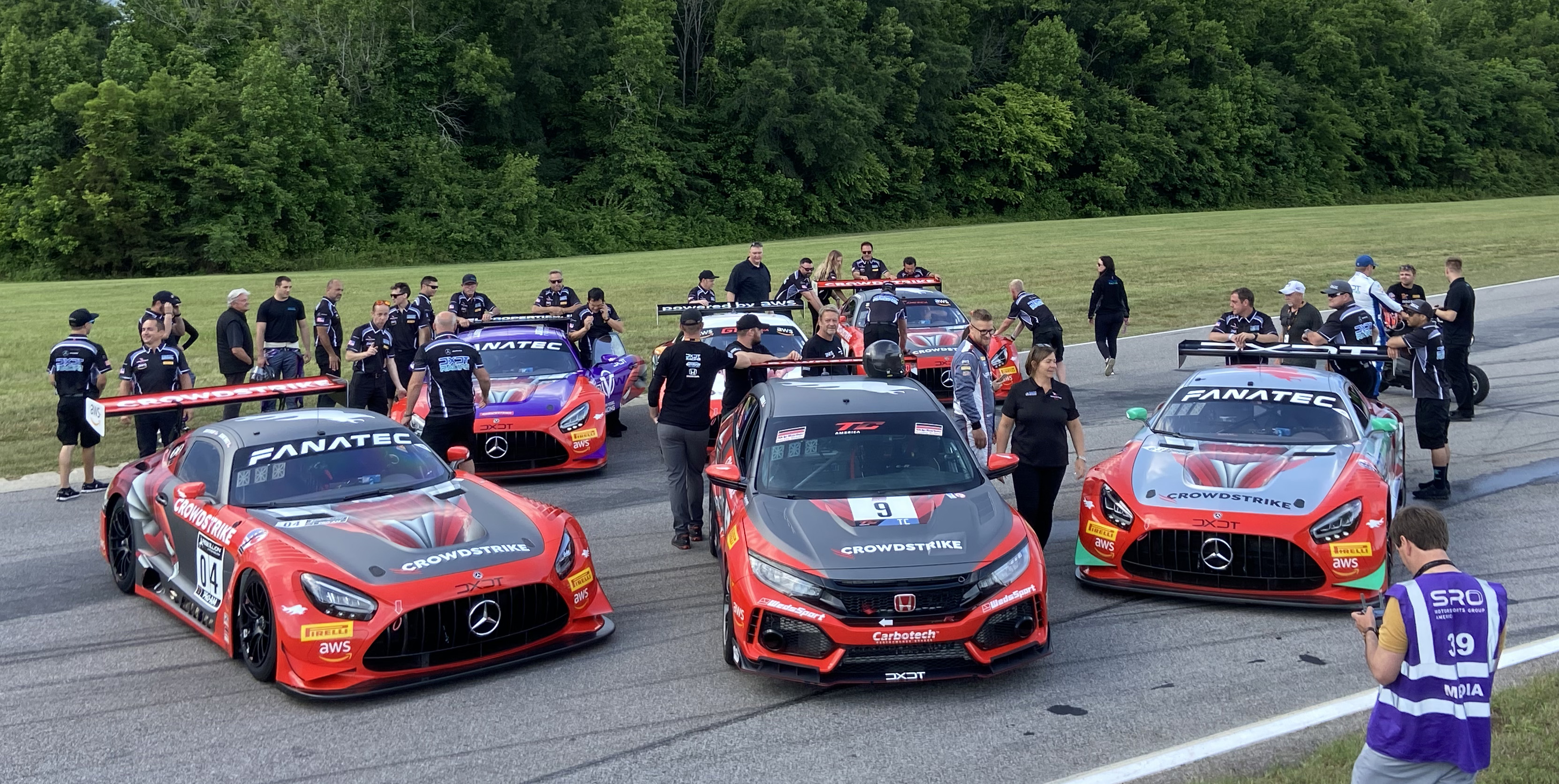
The 2021 DXDT Racing Cars

The team expanded yet again in 2021, growing to three championships: GT World Challenge America, GT America, and TC America. In GT America, the two duos of Kurtz/Braun and Askew/Dalziel returned for a third consecutive year and were joined by Erin Vogel and Michael Cooper in the No. 19 Mercedes AMG GT3. All three teams competed in the pro/am class, earning three wins and nine podiums. The team stayed in contention for the Pro/Am team championship until the final race of the season but finished in second. Kurtz and Braun earned the most wins with two, and Vogel and Cooper earned their first victory together at VIRginia International Raceway. The pair's win at VIR made Vogel the first woman to win a GT3 race in series history.

CJ Moses and George Kurtz ran in the new GT America series, a 40-minute sprint format only for bronze-rated amateur drivers. Due to business commitments, both drivers missed the Road America, Watkins Glen, and Sebring International Raceway rounds. George Kurtz earned both of the team's 2021 wins, sweeping the season-opening round at Sonoma Raceway. The sole DXDT Racing driver in the TC America championship, Kevin Boehm advanced up to the TC class, earning eight podiums and three wins at Sonoma Raceway, Circuit of the Americas, and Indianapolis Motor Speedway. He finished second in the final championship standings, closing the season out with a win at Indianapolis Motor Speedway.

== Intercontinental GT Challenge 8 Hour ==
In 2018, the team took place in their first Intercontinental GT Challenge 8 Hour race at Mazda Raceway Laguna Seca. Though officially an Intercontinental GT Challenge event, the California 8 Hour also acted as the season finale event for Pirelli World Challenge, filled with GT3, GT Cup, GT4, MARC, and TCR cars. DXDT closed out the year with their endurance racing debut at the 8 Hour, seeing the first appearance of Askew's future co-driver Ryan Dalziel, and Mike Hedlund joining Askew in the lineup. The trio finished second in class, but were promoted to the class victory nearly eight months later after Strakka Racing driver Nick Leventis tested positive for several banned substances in the months following the event. In 2020, the event moved to Indianapolis Motor Speedway, where DXDT brought a two-car lineup to close out the year. George Kurtz, Colin Braun, and Ben Keating drove the No. 04 Mercedes AMG GT3 to victory in the Pro/Am class. The 2021 season also concluded at Indianapolis Motor Speedway in an incident-filled race. DXDT brought all three Mercedes AMG GT3 cars to the event, earning a best finish of fourth place with David Askew, Ryan Dalziel, and Scott Smithson in the No. 63 Mercedes AMG GT3.

== Motorsport Results ==
=== Lamborghini Super Trofeo ===
Year	Class	Car	Drivers	1	2	3	4	5	6	7	8	9	10	Driver Rank	Driver Points	Team Rank	Team Points
2016	Pro Am	Lamborghini Super Trofeo	David Askew & James Burke	LAG; 8	LAG; 2	WGI; 1	WGI; 3	RAM; 1	RAM; 6	VIR; 2	VIR; 8	AUS; 1	AUS; 6	4th	77	5th	53
2016	LB Cup	Lamborghini Super Trofeo	Ross Chouest	LAG; 1	LAG; 3	WGI; 1	WGI; 1	RAM; 1	RAM; 1	VIR; 1	VIR; 1	AUS; 1	AUS; 1	1st	35	5th	53
2016	Pro Am	Lamborghini Super Trofeo	Madison Snow / Enrique Bernoldi & James Burke	LAG; 2 (MS)	LAG; 1 (MS)	WGI -	WGI -	RAM -	RAM -	VIR -	VIR -	AUS; 4	AUS; 6	6th (MS); 14th (EB/JB)	12 (MS); 27 (EB/JB)	5th	53
2017	Pro Am	Lamborghini Super Trofeo	Austin Versteeg	AUS; 2	AUS; 1	WGI; 2	WGI; 1	RAM; 2	RAM; 1	VIR; 2	VIR; 1	LAG; 2	LAG; 1	3rd	146	4th	103
2017	Am	Lamborghini Super Trofeo	Ross Chouest	AUS; 5	AUS; 3	WGI; 3	WGI; 4	RAM -	RAM -	VIR -	VIR -	LAG; 5	LAG; 6	4th	72	4th	103
2017	LB Cup	Lamborghini Super Trofeo	Paul Terry	AUS; 1	AUS; 4	WGI; 2	WGI; 2	RAM; 3	RAM; 3	VIR; 5	VIR; 5	LAG; 5	LAG -	3rd	75	4th	103
2017	Pro Am	Lamborghini Super Trofeo	Rob Hodes	AUS; 4	AUS; 3	WGI -	WGI -	RAM -	RAM -	VIR -	VIR -	LAG -	LAG -	8th	12	4th	103
2017	LB Cup	Lamborghini Super Trofeo	Jeff Burton	AUS	AUS	WGI	WGI	RAM; 5	RAM; 5	VIR; 4	VIR; 5	LAG; 2	LAG -	6th	34	4th	103

=== IMSA Continental Tire Sports Car Challenge ===
Year	Class	Car	Drivers	1	2	3	4	5	6	7	8	9	10	Driver Rank	Driver Points	Team Rank	Team Points
2017	ST	Mercedes AMG	David Askew and Aaron Povoledo	DAY -	SEB -	AUS; 26	WGI; 20	MOS -	LRP -	RAM -	VIR; 18	LAG -	ATL -	28th	39	28th	26
2018	GS	Mercedes AMG	David Askew and Aaron Povoledo	DAY; 12	SEB	MOH	WGI	MOS	LRP	RAM	VIR	LAG	ATL	51st	19	30th	63

=== GT World Challenge America (Formally Pirelli World Challenge) ===
Year	Class	Car	Drivers	1	2	3	4	5	6	7	8	9	10	11	12	13	14	15	16	17	18	19	20	Driver Rank	Driver Points	Team Rank	Team Points
2017	GT SprintX Pro/Am	Mercedes AMG GT3	David Askew & Aaron Povoledo	VIR-X -	VIR-X -	MOS -	MOS -	LRP-X -	LRP-X -	UTA-X; 7	UTA-X; 7	AUS-X -	AUS-X -	AUS-X -										74th	4		
2018	Am	Mercedes AMG GT3	David Askew	STP -	STP -	AUS-X; 2	AUS-X; 2	LBH -	LBH -	VIR-X; 2	VIR-X; 2	MOS -	MOS -	LRP-X -	LRP-X -	RAM; 5	RAM; 4	POR-X; 3	POR-X; 4	UTA-X; 1	UTA-X; 3	WGI; 2	WGI; 2	11th	46	10th	46
2018	Pro/Am	Mercedes AMG GT3	Lawrence De George & Cedric Sbirrazzuoli	STP -	STP -	AUS-X -	AUS-X -	LBH -	LBH -	VIR-X; 5	VIR-X; 5	MOS -	MOS -	LRP-X -	LRP-X -	RAM -	RAM -	POR-X -	POR-X -	UTA-X -	UTA-X -	WGI -	WGI -			10th	46
2019	Pro/Am	No. 63 Mercedes AMG GT3	David Askew & Ryan Dalziel	AUS; Ret	AUS; Ret	VIR; 3	VIR; 9	MOS; 4	MOS; 2	SON; Ret	SON; 10	WGI; 5	WGI; 6	RAM; 8	RAM; 7	LAS -	LAS -							34th	11	8th	69
2019	Pro/Am	No. 04 Mercedes-AMG GT3 Evo	George Kurtz & Colin Braun	AUS; 9	AUS; 4	VIR; 5	VIR; 2	MOS; 3	MOS; 4	SON; 5	SON; 6	WGI; 4	WGI; 5	RAM; 4	RAM; 5	LAS; 5	LAS; 7							18th	23	8th	69
2020	Pro/Am	No. 63 Mercedes AMG GT3	David Askew & Ryan Dalziel	AUS; 10	AUS; 4	VIR; 3	VIR; 5	SON; 3	SON; 3	RAM; 2	RAM; 2	AUS; 3	AUS; 3											4th	134	2nd	235
2020	Pro/Am	No. 04 Mercedes-AMG GT3 Evo	George Kurtz & Colin Braun	AUS; 2	AUS; 2	VIR; 4	VIR; 1	SON; 2	SON; 2	RAM; 3	RAM; 1	AUS -	AUS -											4th	134	2nd	235
2021	Pro/Am	No. 63 Mercedes-AMG GT3 Evo	David Askew & Ryan Dalziel	SON; 2	SON; 7	AUS; 6	AUS; 4	VIR; DNS	VIR; 6	ELK; 5	ELK; 3	WGL; 7	WGL; 5	SEB; 6	SEB; 5									7th	107	2nd	213
2021	Pro/Am	No. 04 Mercedes-AMG GT3 Evo	George Kurtz & Colin Braun	SON; 4	SON; 1	AUS; 5	AUS; 1	VIR; 3	VIR; Ret	ELK; DNS	ELK; DNS	WGL; DNS	WGL; DNS	SEB; DNS	SEB; DNS									6th	111	2nd	213
2021	Pro/Am	No. 19 Mercedes-AMG GT3 Evo	Erin Vogel & Michael Cooper	SON; 5	SON; 4	AUS; 9	AUS; Ret	VIR; 1	VIR; 5	ELK; 7	ELK; Ret	WGL; 3	WGL; 6	SEB; 7	SEB; 2									5th	114	2nd	213

=== Intercontinental GT Challenge 8 Hour ===
Year	Event	Class	Car	Drivers	Result in Class	Result Overall
2018	California 8 Hours	GT3 Pro Am	Mercedes AMG GT3	David Askew, Ryan Dalziel, and Mike Hedlund	1st	12th
2020	Indianapolis 8 Hour	GT3 Pro Am	Mercedes AMG GT3	David Askew, Ryan Dalziel, and Richard Heistand	Ret.	Ret.
2020	Indianapolis 8 Hour	GT3 Pro Am	Mercedes AMG GT3	George Kurtz, Colin Braun, and Ben Keating	1st	5th
2021	Indianapolis 8 Hour	GT3 Pro Am	No. 63 Mercedes AMG GT3	David Askew, Ryan Dalziel, and Scott Smithson	4th	14
2021	Indianapolis 8 Hour	GT3 Pro Am	No. 04 Mercedes AMG GT3	George Kurtz, Colin Braun, and Ben Keating	6th	27th
2021	Indianapolis 8 Hour	GT3 Pro Am	No. 19 Mercedes AMG GT3	Erin Vogel, Michael Cooper, and Thomas Merrill	Ret.	Ret.

=== GT America ===
Year	Class	Car	Driver	1	2	3	4	5	6	7	8	9	10	11	12	13	14	15	16	Driver Rank	Driver Points	Team Rank	Team Points
2021	SRO3	Mercedes AMG GT3	George Kurtz	SON; 1	SON; 1	AUS; Ret	AUS; 4	VIR; 6	VIR; Ret	NSH; 6	NSH; 4	RAM -	RAM -	WGI -	WGI -	SEB -	SEB -	IMS -	IMS -	8th	90	6th	116
2021	SRO3	Mercedes AMG GT3	CJ Moses	SON -	SON -	AUS -	AUS; 7	VIR; 5	VIR; 4	NSH; 7	NSH; 8	RAM -	RAM -	WGI -	WGI -	SEB -	SEB -	IMS; 7	IMS; 7	10th	46	6th	116
2021	SRO3	Mercedes AMG GT3	David Askew	SON -	SON -	AUS -	AUS -	VIR -	VIR -	NSH; 3	NSH; 3	RAM -	RAM -	WGI -	WGI -	SEB -	SEB -	IMS -	IMS -			6th	116

=== TC America ===
Year	Class	Car	Driver	1	2	3	4	5	6	7	8	9	10	11	12	13	14	15	16	Driver Rank	Driver Points	Team Rank	Team Points
2020	TCR	Honda Civic Type-R	CJ Moses	AUS; 3	AUS; 4	VIR; 2	VIR; 8	VIR; 6	SON; 4	SON; 3	SON; 4	RAM; 5	RAM; 3	RAM; 6	AUS; 7	AUS; 7	AUS; 4	IMS; 2	IMS; 4	5th	158	1st	288
2020	TCR	Honda Civic Type-R	Scott Smithson	AUS; 5	AUS; 7	VIR; 5	VIR; 3	VIR; 3	SON -	SON -	SON -	RAM; 2	RAM; 1	RAM; 1	AUS; 2	AUS; 6	AUS; 1	IMS; Ret.	IMS; DNS	3rd	183	1st	288
2020	TCA	Honda Civic SI	Kevin Boehm	AUS; 4	AUS; 2	VIR; 4	VIR; 4	VIR; 9	SON; 4	SON; 4	SON; 2	RAM; 1	RAM; 1	RAM; 1	AUS; 1	AUS; 1	AUS; 4	IMS; 1	IMS; 2	1st	288	1st	288
2020	TCR	Honda Civic Type-R	Olivia Askew	AUS -	AUS -	VIR; 6	VIR; 7	VIR; 7	SON -	SON -	SON -	RAM; 4	RAM; Ret.	RAM; 5	AUS; 6	AUS; 5	AUS; 6	IMS; 4	IMS; 5	6th	92	1st	288
2021	TC	Honda Civic Type-R	Kevin Boehm	SON; 3	SON; 1	AUS; 4	AUS; 1	VIR; 7	VIR; 5	RAM; 4	RAM; 6	WGI; 2	WGI; 2	SEB; 2	SEB; Ret.	IMS; 2	IMS; 1			2nd	202	3rd	207
