= Charles Espenlaub =

American racing driver (born 1968)

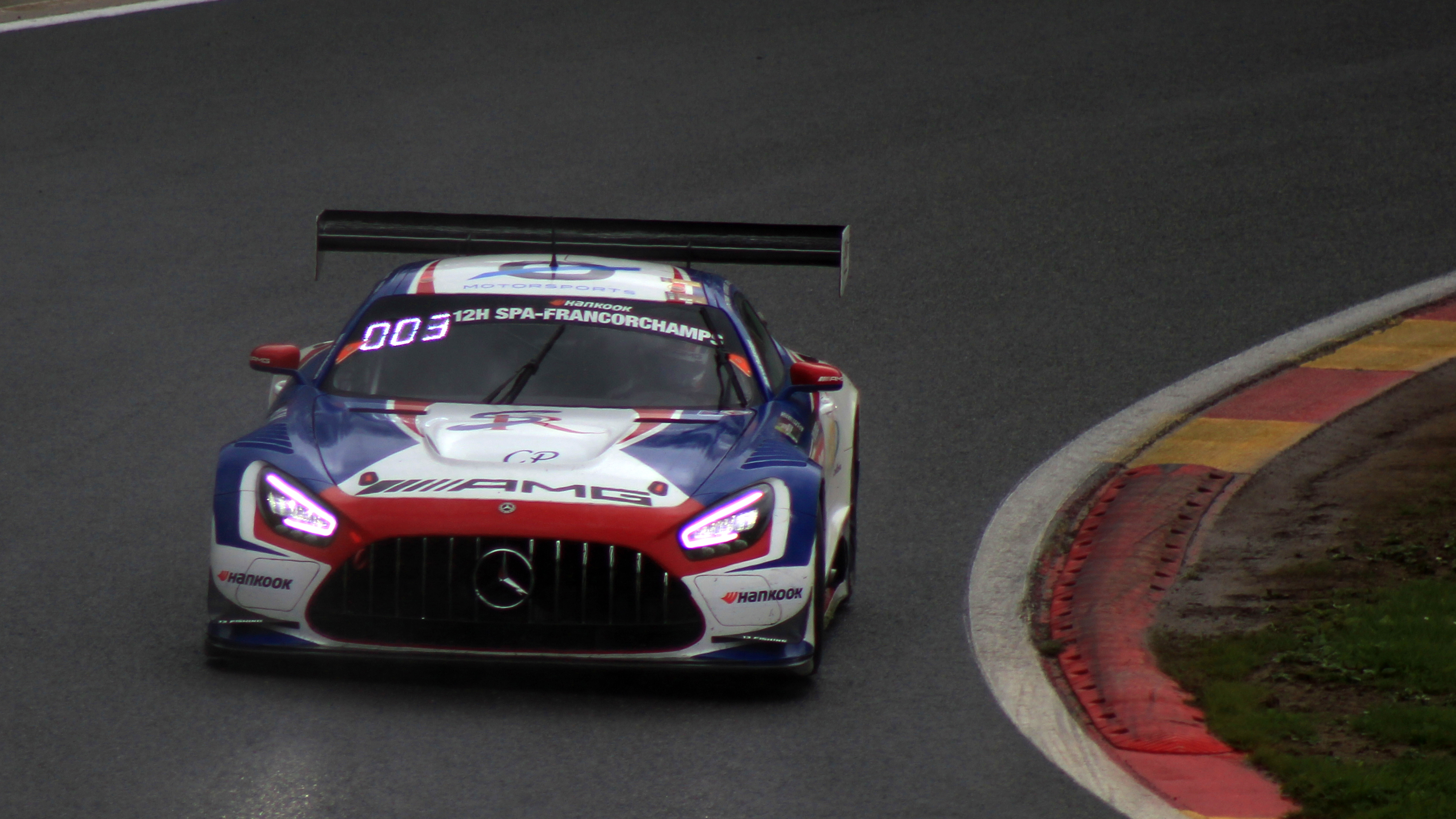
- Espenlaub in 2023
- Nationality: (United States) American
- Born: September 22, 1968 (age 58) Lutz, Florida, U.S.
- Categorisation: FIA Silver (until 2014, 2018–2023); FIA Gold (2015–2017); FIA Bronze (2024–)

Championship titles
- 2025 2023 2022–23, 2023–24 2020, 2022 2020, 2022 2018 2018 2017 2010: Porsche Endurance Challenge North America – Cayman Pro-Am; 24H GT Series – GT3 Am; Middle East Trophy – GT3 Am; 24H GT Series Continents – GT3 Am; 24H GT Series Europe – GT3 Am; 24H GT Series Continents – A6; 24H GT Series Europe – A6; 24H Series – 991; Continental Tire Sports Car Challenge – GS

Charles Espenlaub (born September 22, 1968) is an American racing driver who last competed in Porsche Endurance Challenge North America for HM Road Racing.

He is a multi-time 24H Series champion, and previously competed in IMSA, the Grand-Am Rolex Sports Car Series, and won CTSCC in 2010.

== Career ==
Espenlaub made his car racing debut in 1996, racing in the Firehawk Endurance Championship. Following that, Espenlaub primarily raced in the BMG Motorola Cup (Note: The series was renamed to Grand-Am Cup in 2001 following Grand-Am Road Racing's acquisition.) from 1998 until 2002, most notably taking a Grand Sport class win at Toronto in 2000 and a ST II class win at Phoenix two years later. During this period, Espenlaub also began racing in the TC class of the Speed World Challenge from 2001, but had to wait until three years later to get his maiden series podium, doing so at Mosport for Tindol Motorsports. In 2004, Espenlaub also made his Rolex Sports Car Series debut in the SGS and GT classes for Horizon Motorsports, as well as his American Le Mans Series debut for Foxhill Racing in the GT class later that year.

Racing primarily in the Touring Car class of the Speed World Challenge the following year for Tindol Motorsports, Espenlaub took his maiden series win at Mosport to take seventh in points. Continuing in the series for 2006, Espenlaub scored his only podium of the season at Road America as he finished eighth in points. During 2006, Espenlaub also won the Grand-Am Cup opener at Daytona for Team Sahlen and raced for most of the Rolex Sports Car Series season for Tafel Racing in the GT class. Returning for a similar schedule for the next two seasons, Espenlaub took a lone podium in both SWC and KONI Sports Car Challenge in 2007, doing so at Watkins Glen and Iowa respectively.

In 2009, Espenlaub raced with Tri-Point Motorsports for another season in the TC class of the Speed World Challenge, taking a best result of second at Mosport, Watkins Glen and Road America en route to a fifth-place points finish. During 2009, Espenlaub also competed for Mazda-fielding Dempsey Racing in select rounds of the Rolex Sports Car Series in the GT class, scoring a best result of fourth at Barber. The following year, Espenlaub joined BMW-aligned Fall-Line Motorsports to compete in the GS class of the Continental Tire Sports Car Challenge, scoring a lone win at Watkins Glen and three other podiums to clinch the series title. During 2010, Espenlaub also returned to Dempsey Racing for another part-time campaign in the Rolex Sports Car Series, once again driving the team's Mazda RX-8 in the GT class.

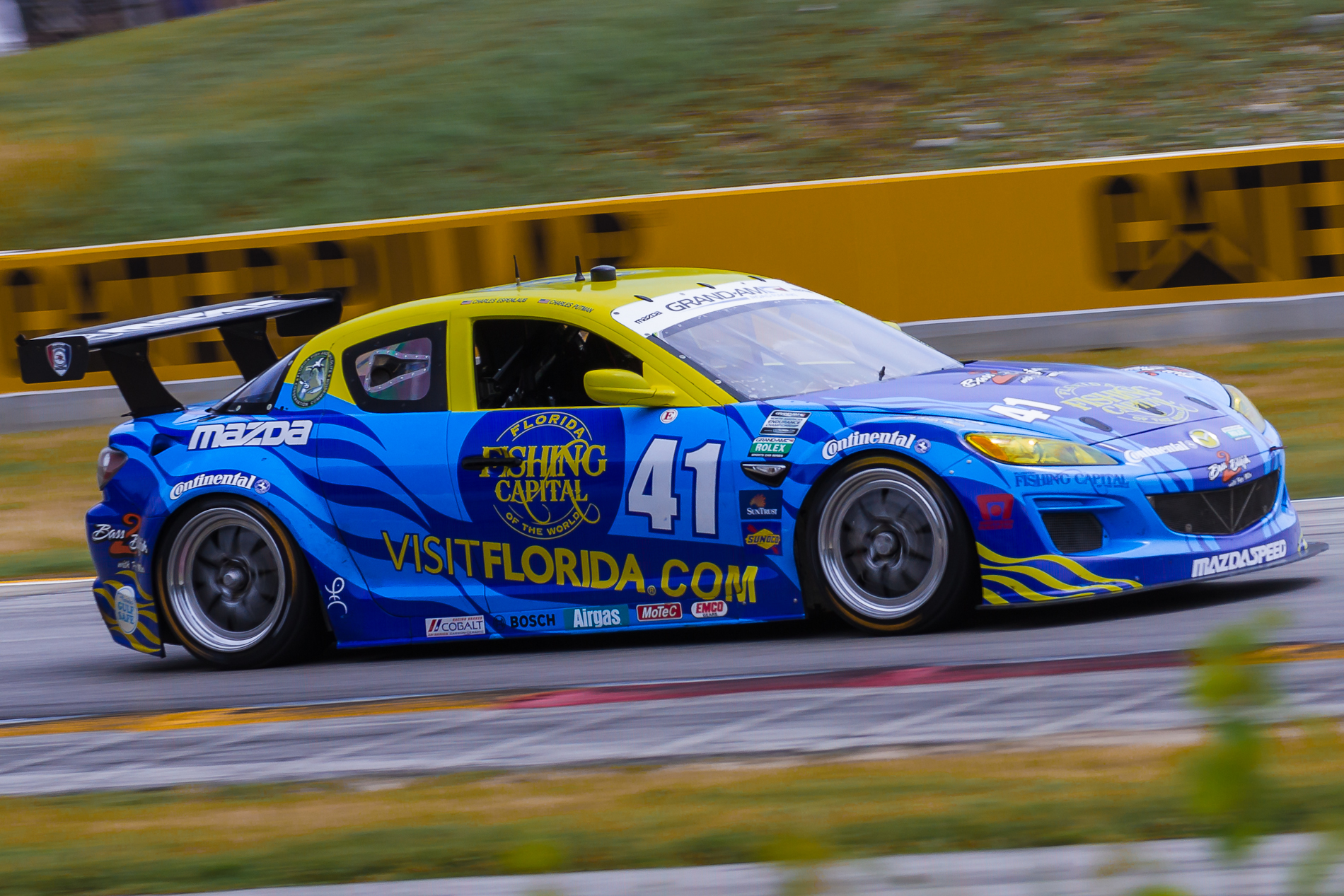
Espenlaub in his Visit Florida Dempsey Racing Mazda at Road America in 2012.

The following year, Espenlaub remained with Fall-Line to defend his CTSCC title, scoring a pair of podiums at Laguna Seca and Mid-Ohio to take fifth in the GS standings. During 2011, Espenlaub also continued with Dempsey Racing for another part-time campaign in the Rolex Sports Car Series, which most notably yielded a class podium at the 24 Hours of Daytona. Espenlaub then continued with Fall-Line for another CTSCC season in 2012, taking three podiums to finish eighth in points, in a year in which he also contested his only full-time campaign in the Rolex Sports Car Series for Dempsey Racing in the GT class.

Continuing in CTSCC through the following year, Espenlaub took a pair of third-place finishes at Circuit of the Americas and Laguna Seca to secure third in the GS points. In parallel, Espenlaub raced with Prospeed Competition in select one-off appearances around Europe. In 2014, Espenlaub and Fall-Line Motorsports stepped up to the GTD class of the newly-formed United SportsCar Championship, scoring a best result of sixth at the 12 Hours of Sebring in the team's Audi R8 LMS ultra. During 2014, Espenlaub also raced part-time in the Continental Tire Sports Car Challenge, most notably scoring a lone ST class podium at Kansas.

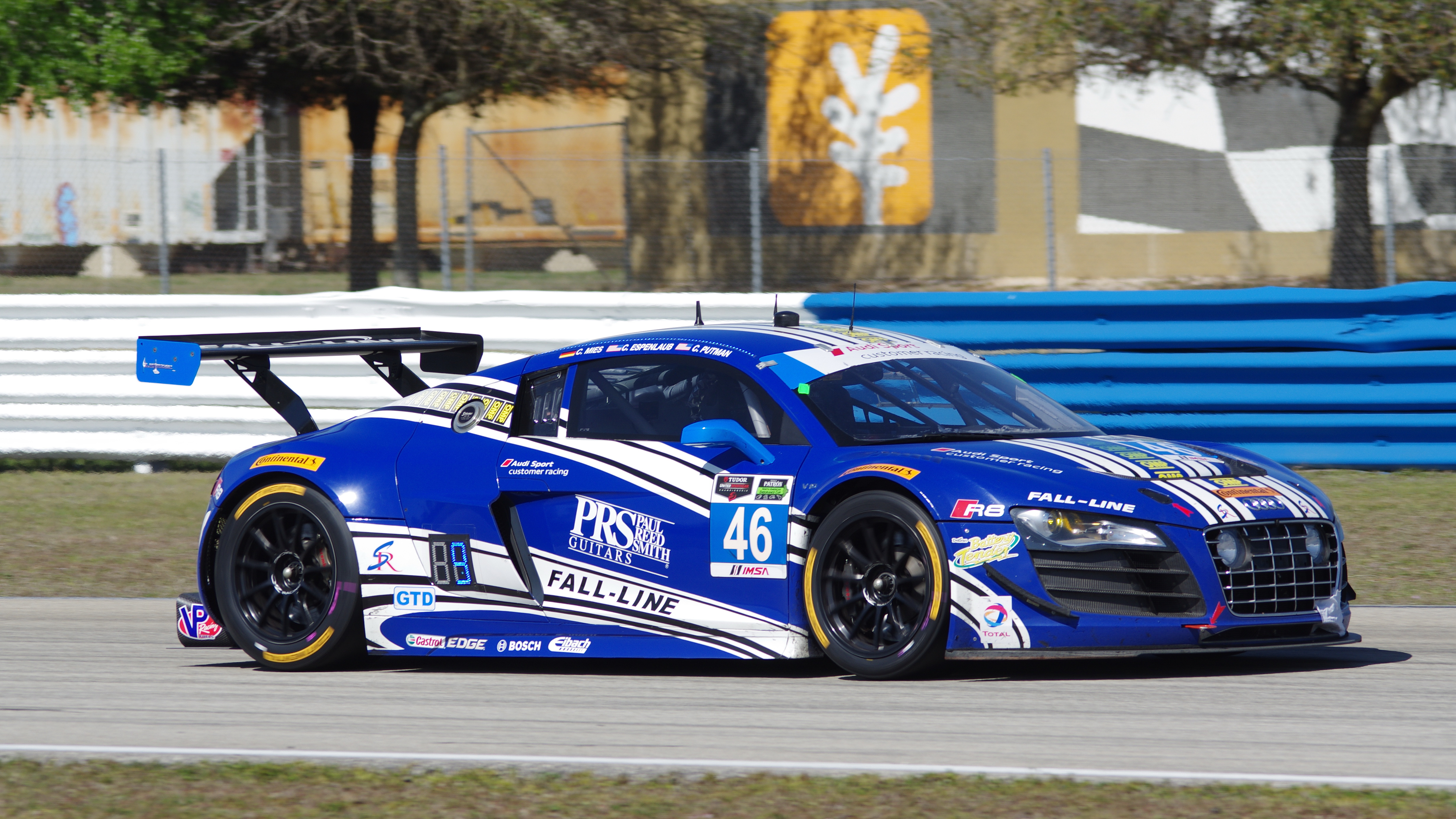
Espenlaub driving his Fall-Line Audi at the 2014 12 Hours of Sebring.

Espenlaub then joined MRS GT-Racing to compete in most of the 24H Series season in the 997 class, taking a lone podium at Zandvoort to end the year fifth in points. At the end of the year, Espenlaub won the Gulf 12 Hours in the Cup class with the same team. Returning to MRS GT-Racing for the 2016 season, Espenlaub took his maiden class win in the series, doing so at Mugello in the 991 class. Switching to fellow Porsche customer team PROsport Performance for the following year, Espenlaub all but one of the six races he contested in the 991 class, sealing the title in dominant fashion at season's end. During the season, Espenlaub made a one-off appearance in the SP2 class at Algarve, which he won.

In 2018, Espenlaub and PROsport stepped up to the A6 Am class, winning both the Continents and Europe titles aboard their Mercedes-AMG GT3. The following year, Espenlaub moved to teammate Charles Putman's fellow AMG-fielding team CP Racing to continue in the 24H GT Series, finishing runner-up in A6 Am in both Continents and European championships. Continuing with the team through 2020, Espenlaub took GT3 Am wins at the Hockenheimring and Pergusa en route to the Continents and European titles for the second time in three years.

The following year, Espenlaub only scored a pair of GT3 Am podiums, as he slipped to eighth in the standings with a best result of second at the Hungaroring. In 2022, Espenlaub took an overall win Algarve and three other GT3 Am class wins to take his third Continents and European titles in five years. At the end of the year, Espenlaub raced in the 2022–23 Middle East Trophy, which he also won in GT3 Am after taking wins in Kuwait and the 2023 Dubai 24 Hour. Continuing with CP Racing through the rest of 2023, Espenlaub raced with them for another season of 24H GT Series, as well as a maiden full-time campaign in the Nürburgring Langstrecken-Serie's SP9 Pro-Am class. Between the two campaigns, Espenlaub most notably took a class win at Monza in the former en route to another GT3 Am title. At the end of the year, Espenlaub raced in the 2023–24 Middle East Trophy with them, which he won in class for a second consecutive season after taking a lone outright win in Kuwait.

Continuing with CP Racing through the early stages of 2024, Espenlaub raced with them in the first two rounds of the 24H Series, most notably winning the 12 Hours of Spa-Francorchamps, in what was the team's final race in the series. The following year, Espenlaub joined HM Road Racing to compete in Porsche Endurance Challenge North America alongside Brandon Chappell in the Cayman Pro-Am class, which they won at season's end. Remaining with HM Road Racing for 2026, Espenlaub stepped up to the GT3 Cup Am class alongside Henry Marshall, in which he finished runner-up in points after finishing on the podium in all four races.

== Racing record ==
=== Racing career summary ===
| Season | Series | Team | Races | Wins | Poles | F/Laps | Podiums | Points | Position |
|---|---|---|---|---|---|---|---|---|---|
| 1996 | Firehawk Endurance Championship | | | | | | | | |
| 1997 | IMSA GT Championship – GTS-3 | | 1 | 0 | 0 | 0 | 0 | | |
| 1998 | BMG Motorola Cup – S | Bell Motorsport | 1 | 0 | 0 | 0 | 1 | | |
| 1999 | BMG Motorola Cup – GS | Kent Engineering | 8 | 0 | 0 | 0 | 0 | | |
| 1999 | Speedvision World Challenge – TC | | 1 | 0 | 0 | 0 | 0 | 14 | 42nd |
| 2000 | BMG Motorola Cup – GS | Kent Engineering | 7 | 1 | 0 | 0 | 2 | 104 | 13th |
| 2000 | Grand American Sports Car Series – GTU | Genesis Racing | 1 | 0 | 0 | 0 | 0 | 26 | 106th |
| 2001 | Speed World Challenge – TC | Wilwood/OZ-Racing | 7 | 0 | 0 | 0 | 0 | 51 | 23rd |
| 2001 | Grand-Am Cup – GS | Mike Baughman Racing | 3 | 0 | 0 | 0 | 0 | | |
| 2001 | Grand-Am Cup – SGS | Encompass | 1 | 0 | 0 | 0 | 1 | | |
| 2002 | Speed World Challenge – TC | APR Performance/JT Designs | 11 | 0 | 0 | 0 | 0 | 80 | 18th |
| 2002 | Grand-Am Cup – ST II | DTM Engineering | 4 | 1 | 0 | 0 | 2 | | |
| 2002 | Grand-Am Cup – GS II | Pegasus Racing | 4 | 0 | 0 | 0 | 2 | | |
| 2003 | Speed World Challenge – TC | Circuit City | 10 | 0 | 0 | 0 | 0 | 84 | 16th |
| 2003 | Speed World Challenge – GT | Steeda Autosports | 1 | 0 | 0 | 0 | 0 | 13 | 39th |
| 2004 | Rolex Sports Car Series – SGS | Horizon Motorsports | 1 | 0 | 0 | 0 | 0 | 26 | 41st |
| 2004 | Rolex Sports Car Series – GT | Horizon Motorsports | 5 | 0 | 0 | 0 | 0 | 115 | 15th |
| 2004 | Speed World Challenge – TC | Tindol Motorsports | 8 | 0 | 0 | 1 | 1 | 107 | 12th |
| 2004 | Grand-Am Cup – GS | Frederick Motorsports | 1 | 0 | 0 | 0 | 0 | 14 | 92nd |
| 2004 | Grand-Am Cup – ST | SpeedSource | 1 | 0 | 0 | 0 | 0 | 26 | 57th |
| 2004 | American Le Mans Series – GT | Foxhill Racing/Comprent Motor Sports | 1 | 0 | 0 | 0 | 0 | 0 | NC |
| 2005 | Rolex Sports Car Series – GT | Horizon Motorsports | 6 | 0 | 0 | 0 | 0 | 70 | 45th |
| 2005 | Speed World Challenge – TC | Tindol Motorsports | 10 | 1 | 1 | 2 | 3 | 193 | 7th |
| 2005 | Grand-Am Cup – ST | SpeedSource | 4 | 0 | 0 | 0 | 0 | 66 | 42nd |
| 2005 | Grand-Am Cup – GS | Knobel Racing | 1 | 0 | 0 | 0 | 0 | 24 | 86th |
| 2006 | Rolex Sports Car Series – GT | Tafel Racing | 8 | 0 | 0 | 0 | 0 | 222 | 23rd |
| 2006 | Speed World Challenge – TC | Tindol Motorsports | 10 | 0 | 1 | 1 | 1 | 154 | 8th |
| 2006 | Grand-Am Cup – GS | Team Sahlen | 1 | 1 | 0 | 0 | 1 | 100 | 30th |
| 2006 | Grand-Am Cup – GS | Tafel Racing | 4 | 0 | 0 | 0 | 0 | 100 | 30th |
| 2006 | Grand-Am Cup – GS | Hyper Sport | 2 | 0 | 0 | 0 | 0 | 100 | 30th |
| 2006 | Grand-Am Cup – ST | Davis Motorsports | 2 | 0 | 1 | 0 | 0 | 48 | 50th |
| 2006 | Grand-Am Cup – ST | Roar Racing | 1 | 0 | 0 | 0 | 0 | 48 | 50th |
| 2007 | Speed World Challenge – TC | Tindol Motorsports | 9 | 0 | 0 | 0 | 1 | 161 | 9th |
| 2007 | KONI Sports Car Challenge – GS | Kinetic Motorsports | 7 | 0 | 0 | 0 | 1 | 143 | 21st |
| 2007 | KONI Sports Car Challenge – ST | Roar Racing | 4 | 0 | 0 | 0 | 0 | 30 | 67th |
| 2007 | Rolex Sports Car Series – GT | Team Spencer Motorsports | 1 | 0 | 0 | 0 | 0 | 21 | 82nd |
| 2008 | Rolex Sports Car Series – GT | Hyper Sport | 4 | 0 | 0 | 0 | 0 | 62 | 46th |
| 2008 | KONI Sports Car Challenge – GS | Automatic Racing | 7 | 0 | 0 | 0 | 0 | 143 | 21st |
| 2008 | KONI Sports Car Challenge – ST | Roar Racing | 3 | 0 | 0 | 0 | 0 | 30 | 67th |
| 2008 | KONI Sports Car Challenge – ST | Freedom Autosport | 1 | 0 | 0 | 0 | 0 | 30 | 67th |
| 2008 | Speed World Challenge – TC | Tri-Point Motorsports | 10 | 0 | 0 | 0 | 0 | 685 | 8th |
| 2009 | KONI Sports Car Challenge – GS | Automatic Racing | 7 | 0 | 0 | 0 | 0 | 148 | 20th |
| 2009 | Rolex Sports Car Series – GT | Dempsey Racing | 7 | 0 | 0 | 0 | 0 | 148 | 19th |
| 2009 | Speed World Challenge – TC | Tri-Point Motorsports | 10 | 0 | 2 | 0 | 3 | 847 | 5th |
| 2010 | Continental Tire Sports Car Challenge – GS | Fall-Line Motorsports | 10 | 1 | 0 | 0 | 4 | 223 | **1st** |
| 2010 | Continental Tire Sports Car Challenge – ST | Freedom Autosport | 2 | 0 | 0 | 0 | 0 | 17 | 83rd |
| 2010 | Rolex Sports Car Series – GT | Dempsey Racing | 9 | 0 | 0 | 0 | 0 | 198 | 15th |
| 2010 | SCCA Pro Racing World Challenge – GTS | Mazdaspeed | 1 | 0 | 0 | 0 | 0 | 85 | 17th |
| 2011 | Continental Tire Sports Car Challenge – GS | Fall-Line Motorsports | 9 | 0 | 0 | 0 | 2 | 223 | 5th |
| 2011 | Rolex Sports Car Series – GT | Dempsey Racing | 5 | 0 | 0 | 0 | 1 | 70 | 26th |
| 2012 | Continental Tire Sports Car Challenge – GS | Fall-Line Motorsports | 11 | 0 | 0 | 1 | 3 | 203 | 8th |
| 2012 | Rolex Sports Car Series – GT | Dempsey Racing | 13 | 0 | 0 | 0 | 0 | 280 | 9th |
| 2013 | Continental Tire Sports Car Challenge – GS | Fall-Line Motorsports | 11 | 0 | 1 | 0 | 1 | 251 | **3rd** |
| 2013 | Blancpain Endurance Series – Pro-Am | Prospeed Competition | 1 | 0 | 0 | 0 | 0 | 0 | NC |
| 2013 | Blancpain Endurance Series – Gentleman | Prospeed Competition | 1 | 0 | 0 | 0 | 0 | 4 | 39th |
| 2013 | ADAC GT Masters | Prospeed Competition | 2 | 0 | 0 | 0 | 0 | 0 | NC |
| 2013 | British GT Championship – GT3 | Prospeed Competition | 1 | 0 | 0 | 0 | 0 | 3 | 30th |
| 2013 | American Le Mans Series – GTC | Dempsey Racing/Del Piero | 1 | 0 | 0 | 0 | 0 | 10 | 22nd |
| 2014 | Continental Tire Sports Car Challenge – GS | Automatic Racing | 2 | 0 | 0 | 0 | 0 | 57 | 43rd |
| 2014 | United SportsCar Championship – GTD | Fall-Line Motorsports | 9 | 0 | 0 | 0 | 0 | 145 | 25th |
| 2014 | Continental Tire Sports Car Challenge – ST | Rebel Rock Racing | 2 | 0 | 0 | 0 | 1 | 60 | 51st |
| 2014 | Continental Tire Sports Car Challenge – ST | Irish Mike's Racing | 3 | 0 | 0 | 0 | 0 | 60 | 51st |
| 2014 | 24 Hours of Nürburgring – V6 | PROsport Performance | 1 | 0 | 0 | 0 | 0 | —N/a | DNF |
| 2015 | Continental Tire Sports Car Challenge – GS | Tim Bell Racing | 1 | 0 | 0 | 0 | 0 | 77 | 18th |
| 2015 | Continental Tire Sports Car Challenge – GS | Automatic Racing | 5 | 0 | 0 | 0 | 0 | 77 | 18th |
| 2015 | 24H Series – 997 | MRS GT-Racing | 5 | 0 | 0 | 0 | 1 | 59 | 5th |
| 2015 | 24 Hours of Nürburgring – SP7 | PROsport Performance | 1 | 0 | 0 | 0 | 0 | —N/a | DNF |
| 2015 | Gulf 12 Hours – Cup | MRS GT-Racing | 1 | 1 | 0 | 0 | 1 | —N/a | **1st** |
| 2016 | 24H Series – 991 | MRS GT-Racing | 6 | 1 | 0 | 0 | 3 | 0 | NC |
| 2016 | Continental Tire SportsCar Challenge – GS | Automatic Racing | 5 | 0 | 0 | 0 | 1 | 134 | 8th |
| 2016 | Pirelli World Challenge – GTS | RT Motorsports | 2 | 0 | 0 | 0 | 0 | 156 | 24th |
| 2016 | 24 Hours of Nürburgring – SP6 | PROsport Performance | 1 | 0 | 0 | 0 | 0 | —N/a | DNF |
| 2017 | Continental Tire SportsCar Challenge – GS | Automatic Racing | 4 | 0 | 0 | 0 | 0 | 80 | 23rd |
| 2017 | Bathurst 12 Hour – C | PROsport Performance | 0 | 0 | 0 | 0 | 0 | —N/a | DNS |
| 2017 | 24H Series – 991 | PROsport Performance | 6 | 5 | 0 | 0 | 6 | 118 | **1st** |
| 2017 | 24H Series – SP2 | PROsport Performance | 1 | 1 | 0 | 0 | 1 | 0 | NC |
| 2017 | 24 Hours of Nürburgring – SP6 | PROsport Performance | 1 | 0 | 0 | 0 | 0 | —N/a | DNF |
| 2017 | California 8 Hours – GT4 | Automatic Racing | 1 | 0 | 0 | 0 | 0 | —N/a | DNF |
| 2018 | Bathurst 12 Hour – B | Wall Racing | 1 | 0 | 0 | 0 | 4 | —N/a | **2nd** |
| 2018 | 24H GT Series Continents – A6 | PROsport Performance | 3 | 2 | 0 | 0 | 2 | 85 | **1st** |
| 2018 | 24H GT Series Europe – A6 | PROsport Performance | 6 | 3 | 0 | 0 | 6 | 106 | **1st** |
| 2018 | 24 Hours of Nürburgring – SP7 | PROsport Performance | 1 | 1 | 0 | 0 | 1 | —N/a | **1st** |
| 2018 | California 8 Hours – GT4 | Automatic Racing | 1 | 0 | 0 | 0 | 0 | —N/a | 10th |
| 2019 | 24H GT Series Continents – A6 Am | CP Racing | 4 | 0 | 0 | 0 | 2 | 56 | **2nd** |
| 2019 | 24H GT Series Europe – A6 Am | CP Racing | 5 | 0 | 0 | 0 | 4 | 77 | **2nd** |
| 2019 | VLN Series – SP7 | CP Racing | 1 | 0 | 0 | 0 | 0 | 5 | 26th |
| 2019 | 24 Hours of Nürburgring – SP7 | CP Racing | 0 | 0 | 0 | 0 | 0 | —N/a | DNS |
| 2019 | TCR Spa 500 – Pro-Am | Vmax Engineering | 1 | 0 | 0 | 0 | 0 | —N/a | DNF |
| 2020 | 24H GT Series Continents – GT3 Am | CP Racing | 3 | 1 | 0 | 0 | 2 | 55 | **1st** |
| 2020 | 24H GT Series Europe – GT3 Am | CP Racing | 3 | 2 | 0 | 0 | 3 | 61 | **1st** |
| 2020 | Nürburgring Langstrecken-Serie – SP7 | CP Racing | 2 | 0 | 0 | 0 | 1 | 5.83 | 4th |
| 2020 | Michelin Pilot Challenge – GS | Automatic Racing AMR | 1 | 0 | 0 | 0 | 0 | 17 | 62nd |
| 2020 | 24H TCE Series – TCR | Vmax Engineering | 1 | 0 | 0 | 0 | 0 | 0 | NC |
| 2021 | 24H GT Series – GT3 Am | CP Racing | 6 | 0 | 0 | 0 | 2 | 70 | 8th |
| 2021 | Nürburgring Langstrecken-Serie – SP9 Pro-Am | CP Racing | 4 | 0 | 0 | 0 | 1 | 0 | NC |
| 2021 | 24 Hours of Nürburgring – SP9 Pro-Am | CP Racing | 1 | 0 | 0 | 0 | 0 | —N/a | 6th |
| 2022 | 24H GT Series Continents – GT3 Am | CP Racing | 3 | 3 | 0 | 0 | 3 | 74 | **1st** |
| 2022 | 24H GT Series Europe – GT3 Am | CP Racing | 5 | 2 | 0 | 0 | 5 | 87 | **1st** |
| 2022 | 24 Hours of Nürburgring – SP9 Pro-Am | CP Racing | 1 | 0 | 0 | 0 | 0 | —N/a | 6th |
| 2022 | Nürburgring Langstrecken-Serie – SP9 Pro-Am | CP Racing | 1 | 0 | 0 | 0 | 0 | 0 | NC |
| 2022–23 | Middle East Trophy – GT3 Am | CP Racing | 2 | 2 | 0 | 0 | 2 | 80 | **1st** |
| 2023 | 24H GT Series – GT3 Am | CP Racing | 5 | 1 | 0 | 0 | 2 | 166 | **1st** |
| 2023 | Nürburgring Langstrecken-Serie – SP9 Pro-Am | CP Racing | 7 | 1 | 0 | 0 | 6 | 0 | NC† |
| 2023 | Michelin Pilot Challenge – GS | Murillo Racing | 1 | 0 | 0 | 0 | 0 | 210 | 48th |
| 2023–24 | Middle East Trophy – GT3 Am | CP Racing | 3 | 1 | 0 | 0 | 2 | 72 | **1st** |
| 2024 | 24H Series – GT3 Am | CP Racing | 2 | 1 | 0 | 0 | 2 | 76 | 6th |
| 2024 | 24 Hours of Nürburgring – SP10 | Black Falcon | 1 | 0 | 0 | 0 | 0 | —N/a | DNF |
| 2025 | Porsche Endurance Challenge North America – Cayman Pro-Am | HM Road Racing | | | | | | 267 | **1st** |
| 2025 | Nürburgring Langstrecken-Serie – SP10 | AV Racing by Black Falcon | 1 | 0 | 0 | 0 | 1 | 5 | NC |
| 2026 | Porsche Endurance Challenge North America – GT3 Cup Am | HM Road Racing | 4 | 0 | 0 | 0 | 4 | 247 | **2nd** |
| 2026 | Nürburgring Langstrecken-Serie – SP10 Am | AV Racing by Black Falcon | 1 | 0 | 0 | 0 | 1 | 6 | NC |

^{†} As Espenlaub was a guest driver, he was ineligible to score points.

=== Complete Michelin Pilot Challenge results ===
(key) (Races in bold indicate pole position) (Races in italics indicate fastest lap)

| Year | Entrant | Class | Make | 1 | 2 | 3 | 4 | 5 | 6 | 7 | 8 | 9 | 10 | 11 | 12 | 13 | 14 | Rank | Points |
|---|---|---|---|---|---|---|---|---|---|---|---|---|---|---|---|---|---|---|---|
| 1998 | Bell Motorsport | S | BMW 328is | DAY | HMS1; 2 | MOS1 | MOS2 | MOH | POC | TOR1 | TOR2 | TRO1 | TRO2 | MOS3 | WGL | MTT | HMS2 | ? | ? |
| 1999 | Kent Engineering | GS | Pontiac Firebird | SEB; 7 | ATL; 19 | MOS1; 16 | MOS2; 17 | TOR; 15 | TRO | ATL; 10 | WGL | SEB; 12 | DAY; 23 | | | | | ? | ? |
| 2000 | Kent Engineering | GS | Pontiac Firebird | DAY; 12 | SEB; 6 | PHX | HMS; 13 | MOH; 3 | ELK; 19 | TOR; 1 | MOS | WGL | VIR; 4 | | | | | 13th | 104 |
| 2001 | Mike Baughman Racing | GS | Pontiac Firebird | DAY; 21 | HMS | PHX | WGL | MOH; 21 | MOS | VIR | ELK | TRO | DAY; 4 | | | | | ? | ? |
| 2001 | Encompass | SGS | Chevrolet Corvette C5 Z06 | | | | | | | | | | DAY; 3 | | | | | ? | ? |
| 2002 | DTM Engineering | ST II | Mazda MX-5 | DAY; 5 | CAL; 3 | PHX; 1 | WGL | VIR1; 5 | | | | | | | | | | ? | ? |
| 2002 | Pegasus Racing | GS II | Pontiac Firebird | | | | | | MOH; 7 | VIR2; 3 | MTT; 4 | MOS | DAY; 2 | | | | | ? | ? |
| 2004 | Frederick Motorsports | Grand Sport | Ford Mustang Cobra | DAY | HMS | PHX | MTT | WGL | MOH | HMS | VIR | BAR; 17 | | | | | | 92nd | 14 |
| 2004 | SpeedSource | Street Tuner | Mazda RX-8 | | | | | | | | | | CAL; 5 | | | | | 57th | 26 |
| 2005 | SpeedSource | Street Tuner | Mazda RX-8 | DAY; 6 | CAL | LGA; 24 | WGL; 20 | MOS; 12 | BAR | TRO | MOH; 20 | PHX | VIR | | | | | 42nd | 66 |
| 2005 | Knobel Racing | Grand Sport | Porsche 996 | | | | | | | TRO; 7 | | | | | | | | 86th | 24 |
| 2006 | Team Sahlen | Grand Sport | Porsche 996 | DAY; 1 | | | | | | | | | | | | | | 30th | 100 |
| 2006 | Tafel Racing | Grand Sport | Porsche 996 | | VIR; 29 | LGA; 26 | PHX; 6 | LIM; 32 | MOH | BAR | TRO | | | | | | | 30th | 100 |
| 2006 | Hyper Sport | Grand Sport | Ford Mustang GT | | | | | | | | | UTA; 5 | VIR; 24 | | | | | 30th | 100 |
| 2006 | Davis Motorsports | Street Tuner | Acura RSX-S | | | | | | | BAR; 11 | **TRO**; 4 | | | | | | | 50th | 48 |
| 2006 | Roar Racing | Street Tuner | Mazda RX-8 | | | | | | | | | | VIR; 34 | | | | | 50th | 48 |
| 2007 | Kinetic Motorsports | Grand Sport | Ford Mustang GT | DAY; 44 | HMS; 6 | IOW; 2 | LGA | LIM | MOS | | | | | | VIR; 8 | | | 21st | 143 |
| 2007 | Kinetic Motorsports | Grand Sport | BMW M3 | | | | | | | MOH; 12 | WGL | BAR | TRO; 27 | UTA; 24 | | | | 21st | 143 |
| 2007 | Roar Racing | Street Tuner | Mazda RX-8 | | HMS; 34 | | | | | MOH; 16 | | BAR; 21 | | | VIR; 19 | | | 67th | 30 |
| 2008 | Automatic Racing | Grand Sport | BMW M3 Coupe | DAY; 7 | LIM; 11 | MOS; 26 | | WGL; 30 | BAR; 8 | IOW; 8 | TRO; 8 | NJMP; 20 | UTA; 23 | VIR; 8 | | | | 21st | 143 |
| 2008 | Roar Racing | Street Tuner | Mazda RX-8 | | LIM; 34 | | MOH; 22 | | | | | | | VIR; 21 | | | | 67th | 30 |
| 2008 | Freedom Autosport | Street Tuner | Mazda MX-5 | | | | | | | | TRO; 20 | | | | | | | 67th | 30 |
| 2009 | Automatic Racing | Grand Sport | BMW M3 | DAY; 21 | HMS; 20 | NJMP; 6 | LGA | LIM; 4 | WGL | MOH | BAR; 6 | TRO | UTA; 8 | VIR; 5 | | | | 20th | 148 |
| 2010 | Fall-Line Motorsports | Grand Sport | BMW M3 | DAY; 2 | HMS; 5 | BAR; 6 | VIR | LIM; 3 | WGL; 1 | MOH; 3 | NJMP; 9 | TRO; 5 | UTA; 5 | | | | | 1st | 223 |
| 2010 | Freedom Autosport | Street Tuner | Mazda Speed 3 | | | | | LIM; 14 | | | | TRO; 14 | | | | | | 83rd | 17 |
| 2011 | Fall-Line Motorsports | Grand Sport | BMW M3 | DAY; 4 | HMS; 4 | BAR; 27 | VIR; 4 | LIM; 9 | WGL; 15 | ELK; 7 | LGA; 2 | NJMP; 4 | MOH; 3 | | | | | 5th | 223 |
| 2012 | Fall-Line Motorsports | Grand Sport | BMW M3 | DAY; 2 | BAR; 5 | HMS; 6 | NJMP; 2 | MOH; 23 | ELK; 22 | WGL; 19 | IMS; 3 | LGA; 25 | LIM; 8 | | | | | 8th | 203 |
| 2013 | Fall-Line Motorsports | Grand Sport | BMW M3 | DAY; 19 | COA; 3 | BAR; 7 | ATL; 18 | MOH; 11 | WGL; 4 | IMS; 4 | ELK; 7 | KAN; 7 | LGA; 3 | LIM; 5 | | | | 3rd | 251 |
| 2014 | Automatic Racing | Grand Sport | Aston Martin V8 Vantage GT4 | DAY; 10 | SEB | | | | | | | | | COA; 7 | | | | 43rd | 57 |
| 2014 | Rebel Rock Racing | Street Tuner | Porsche Cayman | | | LGA; 31 | LIM | KAN; 3 | WGL | MOS | IMS | | | | | | | 51st | 60 |
| 2014 | Irish Mike's Racing | Street Tuner | Hyundai Genesis Coupe | | | | | | | | | ELK; 14 | VIR; 21 | COA; 24 | ATL | | | 51st | 60 |
| 2015 | Tim Bell Racing | Grand Sport | Nissan 370Z GT4 | DAY; 18 | SEB | | | | | | | | | | | | | 18th | 77 |
| 2015 | Automatic Racing | Grand Sport | Aston Martin V8 Vantage GT4 | | | LGA; 15 | WGL; 11 | MOS | LIM | ELK; 9 | VIR; 12 | COA; 5 | ATL | | | | | 18th | 77 |
| 2016 | Automatic Racing | Grand Sport | Aston Martin V8 Vantage GT4 | DAY | SEB | LGA | WGL; 8 | MOS | LIM | ELK; 4 | VIR; 4 | COA; 6 | ATL; 3 | | | | | 8th | 134 |
| 2017 | Automatic Racing | Grand Sport | Aston Martin V8 Vantage GT4 | DAY; 7 | SEB | COA | WGL | MOS | LIM; 10 | ELK; 12 | VIR | LGA; 15 | ATL | | | | | 23rd | 80 |
| 2020 | Automatic Racing AMR | Grand Sport | Aston Martin Vantage AMR GT4 | DAY | SEB | ELK | VIR; 14 | ATL | MOH; 1 | MOH; 2 | ATL | LAG | SEB | | | | | 62nd | 17 |
| 2023 | Murillo Racing | Grand Sport | Mercedes-AMG GT4 | DAY | SEB | LGA | DET | WGL | MOS | ELK | VIR | IMS | ATL; 10 | | | | | 48th | 210 |

=== Complete Grand-Am Rolex Sports Car Series results ===
(key) (Races in bold indicate pole position; results in italics indicate fastest lap)

| Year | Team | Class | Make | Engine | 1 | 2 | 3 | 4 | 5 | 6 | 7 | 8 | 9 | 10 | 11 | 12 | 13 | 14 | Rank | Points |
|---|---|---|---|---|---|---|---|---|---|---|---|---|---|---|---|---|---|---|---|---|
| 2004 | Horizon Motorsports | SGS | Porsche 996 GT3 Cup | Porsche 3.6 L Flat-6 | DAY; 5 | MIA | PHX | MTT | WGL | | | | | | | | | | 41st | 26 |
| 2004 | Horizon Motorsports | GT | Pontiac GTO | Pontiac 5.7 L V8 | | | | | | DAY; 7 | MOH | WGL; 8 | MIA | VIR; 11 | BAR; 6 | CAL; 7 | | | 15th | 115 |
| 2005 | Horizon Motorsports | GT | Pontiac GTO | Pontiac 5.7 L V8 | DAY; 22 | MIA; 22 | CAL; WD | LAG; 24 | MTT; WD | WGL; 21 | DAY | BAR; 10 | WGL; WD | MOH; 17 | PHX | WGL; WD | VIR; WD | MEX | 45th | 70 |
| 2006 | Tafel Racing | GT | Porsche 997 GT3 Cup | Porsche 3.6 L Flat-6 | DAY; 12 | MEX; 10 | MIA; 7 | VIR; 20 | LAG; 7 | PHX; 8 | LIM; 7 | WGL; 9 | MOH; WD | DAY | BAR | SON | MIL | | 23rd | 222 |
| 2007 | Hyper Sport | GT | Mazda RX-8 | Mazda 1.3L 3-Rotor | DAY | MEX | MIA | VIR | LAG | LIM | WGL | MOH | DAY | IOW | BAR | CGV | MIL; 10 | | 82nd | 21 |
| 2008 | Hyper Sport | GT | Mazda RX-8 | Mazda 2.0L 3-Rotor | DAY; 24 | MIA | MEX | VIR; 5 | LAG | LIM | WGL; 19 | MOH | DAY | BAR | CGV | NJMP | MIL; 14 | | 46th | 62 |
| 2009 | Dempsey Racing | GT | Mazda RX-8 | Mazda 2.0L 3-Rotor | DAY; 22 | VIR; 7 | NJMP | LAG | WGL; 7 | MOH | DAY | BAR; 4 | WGL; 16 | CGV; 4 | MIL; 11 | MIA | | | 19th | 148 |
| 2010 | Dempsey Racing | GT | Mazda RX-8 | Mazda 2.0L 3-Rotor | DAY; 6 | MIA | BAR | VIR | LIM; 9 | WGL; 7 | MOH; 6 | DAY; 14 | NJMP; 12 | WGL; 7 | CGV; 10 | MIL; 10 | | | 15th | 198 |
| 2011 | Dempsey Racing | GT | Mazda RX-8 | Mazda 2.0L 3-Rotor | DAY; 3 | MIA | BAR; 8 | VIR | LIM | WGL; 9 | ELK | LAG; 13 | NJMP; 9 | WGL | CGV | MOH | | | 26th | 70 |
| 2012 | Dempsey Racing | GT | Mazda RX-8 | Mazda 2.0L 3-Rotor | DAY; 10 | BAR; 8 | MIA; 15 | NJMP; 11 | BEL; 15 | MOH; 11 | ELK; 8 | WGL; 8 | IMS; 9 | WGL; 5 | CGV; 6 | LAG; 11 | LIM; 4 | | 9th | 280 |

=== Complete American Le Mans Series results ===
(key) (Races in bold indicate pole position)

| Year | Team | Class | Make | Engine | 1 | 2 | 3 | 4 | 5 | 6 | 7 | 8 | 9 | 10 | Rank | Points |
|---|---|---|---|---|---|---|---|---|---|---|---|---|---|---|---|---|
| 2004 | Foxhill Racing/Comprent Motor Sports | GT | Porsche 911 GT3-RS | Porsche 3.6 L Flat-6 | SEB | MOH | LIM | SON | POR | MOS | ELK | PET; Ret | LGA | | NC | 0 |
| 2013 | Dempsey Racing/Del Piero | GTC | Porsche 997 GT3 Cup | Porsche 4.0 L Flat-6 | SEB | LBH | LGA | LIM | MOS | ELK | BAL | COT | VIR | PET; 8 | 22nd | 10 |

=== Complete GT World Challenge results ===
==== GT World Challenge Europe Endurance Cup ====
(Races in bold indicate pole position) (Races in italics indicate fastest lap)

| Year | Team | Car | Class | 1 | 2 | 3 | 4 | 5 | 6 | 7 | Pos. | Points |
|---|---|---|---|---|---|---|---|---|---|---|---|---|
| 2013 | Prospeed Competition | Porsche 997 GT3-R | Pro-Am | MNZ; Ret | SIL | LEC | SPA; 6H | SPA; 12H | SPA; 24H | | NC | 0 |
| 2013 | Prospeed Competition | Porsche 997 GT3-R | Gentlemen | | | | | | | NÜR; 34 | 39th | 4 |

=== Complete IMSA SportsCar Championship results ===
(key) (Races in bold indicate pole position) (Races in italics indicate fastest lap)

| Year | Entrant | Class | Chassis | Engine | 1 | 2 | 3 | 4 | 5 | 6 | 7 | 8 | 9 | 10 | 11 | Pos. | Pts |
|---|---|---|---|---|---|---|---|---|---|---|---|---|---|---|---|---|---|
| 2014 | Fall-Line Motorsports | GTD | Audi R8 LMS ultra | Audi CUJ 5.2 L V10 | DAY; 29 | SEB; 6 | LGA; 22 | DET; 15 | WGL; 10 | MOS; 16 | IMS; 14† | ELK; 9† | VIR; 11 | COA; DNS | PET | 25th | 145 |
