= Billy Johnson (racing driver) =

American racing driver

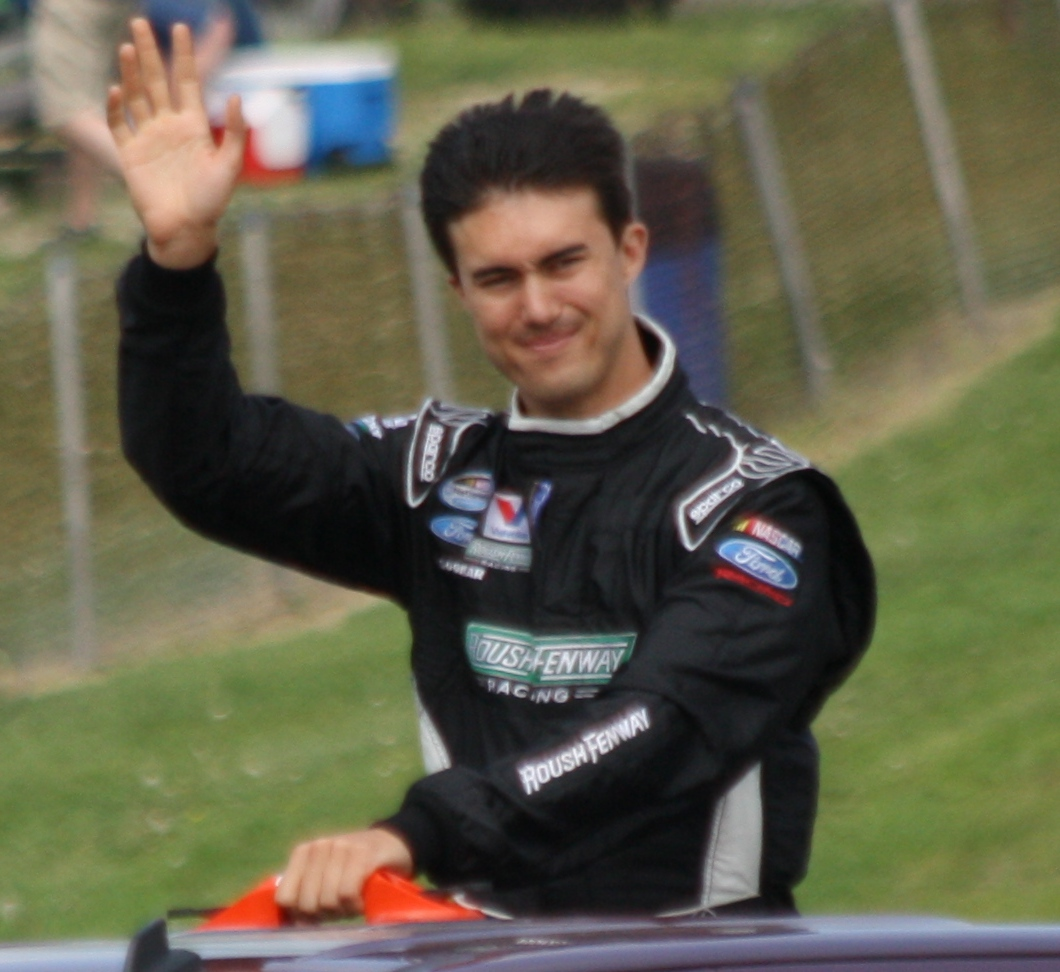
- Johnson at Road America in 2013
- Nationality: (United States) American
- Born: William Ryan Johnson; October 10, 1986 (age 40) Torrance, California, U.S.

WeatherTech SportsCar Championship career
- Debut season: 2014
- Current team: Chip Ganassi Racing
- Categorisation: FIA Gold (until 2016, 2019–); FIA Platinum (2017–2018)
- Car number: 68
- Engine: Ford
- Starts: 4
- Championships: 0
- Wins: 0
- Podiums: 0
- Poles: 0
- Fastest laps: 0
- Best finish: 52nd in 2015

Previous series
- 2013 2005–2006, 2011–2013: American Le Mans Series; Rolex Sports Car Series

NASCAR Cup Series career
- 1 race run over 1 year
- 2017 position: 40th
- Best finish: 40th (2017)
- First race: 2017 Toyota/Save Mart 350 (Sonoma)
Wins	Top tens	Poles
0	0	0

NASCAR O'Reilly Auto Parts Series career
- 5 races run over 4 years
- Best finish: 50th (2013)
- First race: 2010 Zippo 200 at The Glen (Watkins Glen)
- Last race: 2013 CNBC Prime's "The Profit" 200 (Loudon)
Wins	Top tens	Poles
0	1	0

24 Hours of Le Mans career
- Years: 2016–2019
- Teams: Chip Ganassi Racing
- Best finish: 4th in GTE Pro (2016)

William Ryan Johnson (born October 10, 1986) is an American professional sports car and stock car racing driver. He competed in the FIA World Endurance Championship from 2016 to 2019, driving the No. 66 Ford GT for Ford Chip Ganassi Team UK. Johnson was crowned Continental Tire SportsCar Challenge champion in 2016, and made one NASCAR Cup Series start in 2017.

== Racing career ==
=== Early career ===
When he was thirteen years old, Johnson started kart racing. In 2003, he won a scholarship to race in the series Skip Barber Racing School and a scholarship in Valencia, Spain to compete in the inaugural season of Formula BMW USA as a Factory BMW "Junior" driver.

In 2004, Johnson competed in the Formula BMW USA Championship and finished fifth and received the Sportsman of the Year award.

In 2005, Johnson finished in the top-ten of his one and only Star Mazda Pro Series race.

=== Sports cars ===
In 2005, Johnson made his sports car debut with Speed Source co-driving with James Hinchcliffe in the Grand-Am Cup ST class, en route to seven top-ten finishes in seven races. He also made his GT car debut in the Virginia round of the Rolex Sports Car Series with Team Prototype Technology Group in a BMW M3. and had seven top-ten finishes in the Grand-Am Cup ST class driving for SpeedSource, Matt Connolly Motorsports, and Compass 360.

In 2006, Johnson competed in one Speed World Challenge race for Tindol Motorsports as well as the Grand-Am Cup ST class for Kensai Racing, Potter Racing, and ROAR Racing.

2007 was Johnson first full season in sports cars, finishing second in the ST Championship with three victories under Kensai Racing. He also made his Koni Challenge GS class debut thanks to Jim Click Racing, finishing sixth as the highest placing Mustang.

In 2008, Johnson made the progression to a full season in the GS class under Motorsport Technology Group with four podium finishes driving a BMW Z4 M-Coupe and Porsche 997.

In 2009, after winning at Homestead in a Porsche 997 for Motorsport Technology Group, and the team running out of funds halfway through the season, Johnson signed with Roush Fenway Racing's Koni Challenge team, driving a Ford Mustang FR500C alongside Jack Roush Jr. A year later, the two won at Homestead–Miami Speedway, Jack Roush's 400th win as a car owner. They finished third in the championship with a win at New Jersey and multiple podiums.

In late 2011, Johnson finished second in the championship with three victories, at VIR, Watkins Glen, and New Jersey. That year he also joined Turner Motorsport to drive a BMW M3 at the Rolex Sports Car Series, finishing fourth at Montreal.

In 2012, Johnson made his Rolex Daytona Prototype debut with Doran Racing Sunday morning after illness and injury left the team short on drivers mid-race and Johnson filling in having never driven a Prototype. Driving for Roush, he claimed wins at Daytona and Mid-Ohio, and a podium finish in a one-off ST race at Lime Rock and a top-five driving a BMW M3 for RumBum Racing.

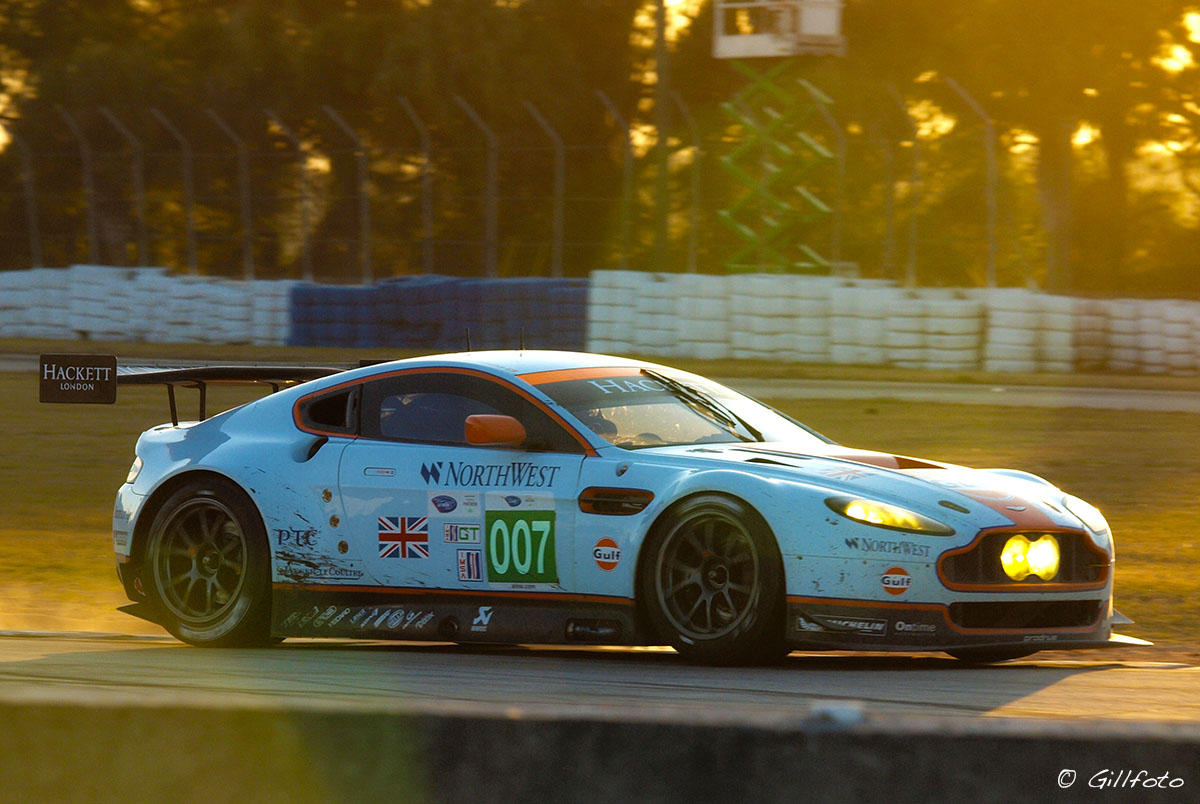
Johnson's No. 007 at the 12 Hours of Sebring in 2013.

In 2013, Johnson made his American Le Mans Series Debut driving for Aston Martin Racing in the 2013 12 Hours of Sebring, finishing ninth. He won at Daytona and Lime Rock in the Continental Tire Sports Car Challenge GS class and had a podium finish at Laguna Seca in the Turner Motorsports BMW M3 in the GT class.

In 2014, Johnson switched to Multimatic Motorsports in the Continental Tire Sports Car Challenge series driving the Boss 302R with Ian James winning the season finale at Road Atlanta. He also drove for Scuderia Corsa in the Ferrari 458 in the GTD class in the 24 Hours of Daytona with Ken Wilden, Dave Empringham, and Rod Randall.

In 2015, Johnson drove with Scott Maxwell in the Boss 302R and debut the Ford Shelby GT350R-C, finishing third in the Championship and winning at Lime Rock. He returned with Turner to drive a BMW Z4 at Petit Le Mans.

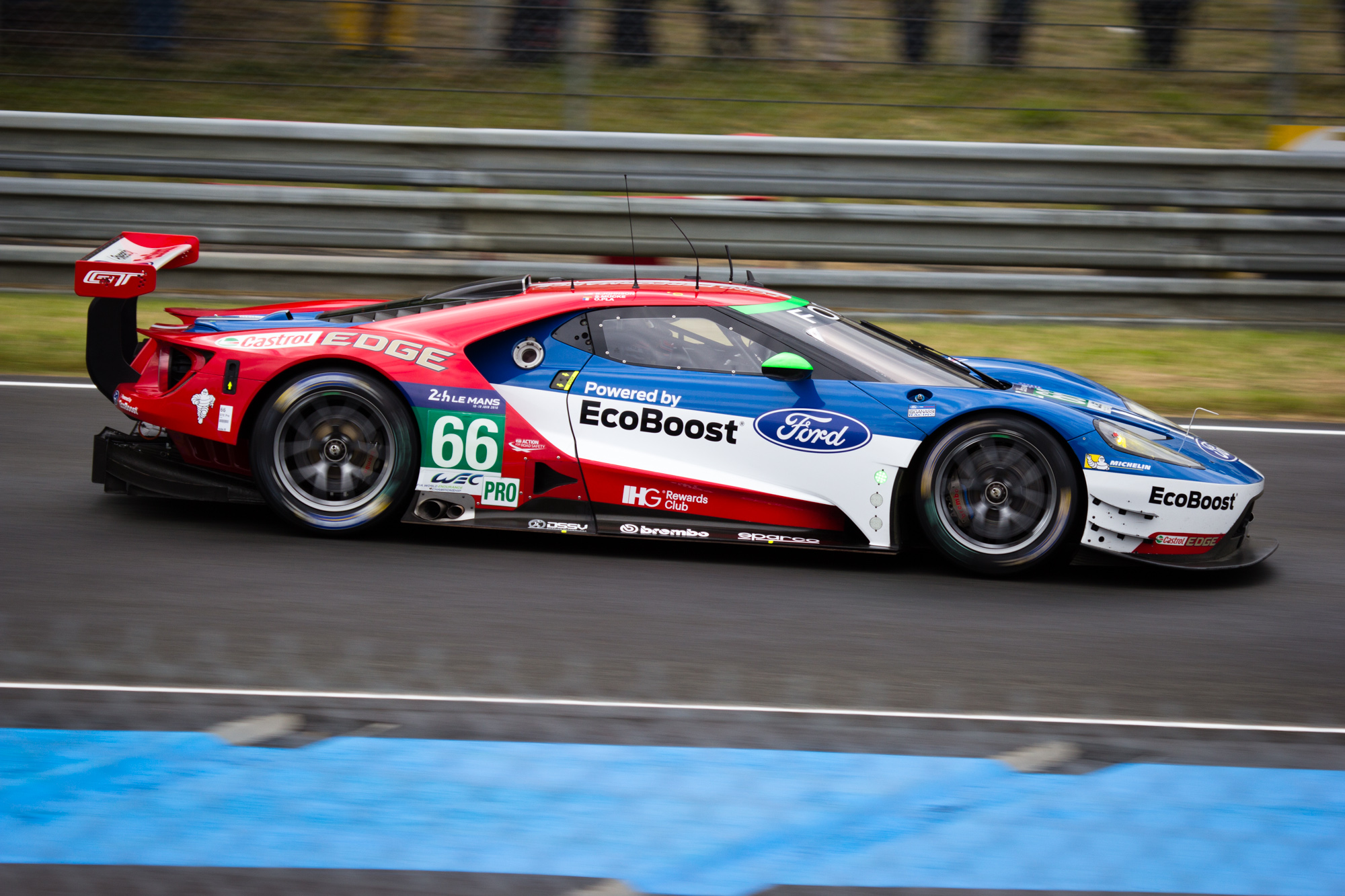
Johnson's No. 66 at the 24 Hours of Le Mans in 2016.

In 2016, Johnson joined Chip Ganassi Racing's FIA World Endurance Championship team, driving the No. 66 Ford GT in the first three races of the season, including the 24 Hours of Le Mans; sharing the car with Olivier Pla and Stefan Mücke, he was the only American to race for Ford in the series that year. They finished fourth at LeMans.

Johnson won the 2016 Continental Tire SportsCar Challenge Championship in the Ford Shelby GT350R-C with Scott Maxwell, winning six races that year - Daytona, Mosport, Lime Rock, Road America, COTA, and Road Atlanta.

Johnson returned to run the 2018–19 FIA World Endurance Championship, and won the opening race at Spa.

=== Testing and coaching ===
Johnson has been involved as a development driver for Ford Motor Company and Multimatic Motorsports during the development of the 2016 Ford GT, Ford GT GTE/GTLM, Mustang GT4, FP350S, Mustang Performance Pack 2, GT350/R, and the new GT500. In addition to testing and development, he has also provided road racing training for Roush drivers Carl Edwards, Greg Biffle, Joey Logano, Brad Keselowski, Chris Buescher, Ricky Stenhouse Jr., Bubba Wallace, Aric Almirola.

=== NASCAR ===
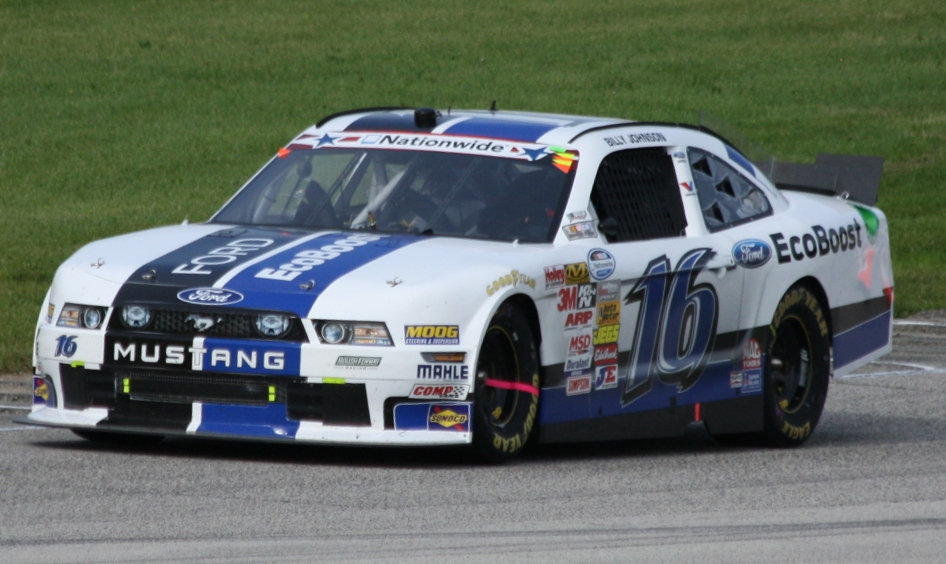
Johnson's No. 16 at Road America in 2013.

In 2010, Johnson made his NASCAR Nationwide Series debut at Watkins Glen International, driving the No. 6 for Roush Fenway Racing as a road course ringer. Despite qualifying ninth, he was involved in a multi-car wreck on lap 24, finishing 36th.

Johnson returned to RFR in the 2011 Nationwide Series, this time at Road America, where he topped the time charts in the first practice before qualifying on second row and running in the top-five until falling out early due to an engine problem.

Running only one race in 2012, Johnson scored his first NASCAR top-ten finish at Circuit Gilles Villeneuve. After running in the top-five most of the day, multiple Green-White-Checker attempts turned it into a fuel mileage race, and he had to pit for fuel on the second attempt from second. On the third and final GWC restart, Johnson drove from twentieth to eighth in two laps.

Coming off of that strong performance, Johnson led his first-ever laps at Road America in 2013. In that race, he started seventh and worked his way to the lead before a lap fourteen pit road speeding penalty. He retook the lead again by lap 39 before being collected in a wreck at lap 47 while running fourth. He then made his first oval start at New Hampshire Motor Speedway, finishing both races in fifteenth place.

In 2017, Johnson joined Richard Petty Motorsports for his Monster Energy NASCAR Cup Series debut at Sonoma Raceway's Toyota/Save Mart 350, driving the No. 43 as a substitute for the injured Aric Almirola. After starting 26th, he finished 22nd.

== Personal life ==
Johnson is of Japanese descent. He graduated from California State University, Fullerton where he majored in Business.

== Motorsports career results ==
=== Sports car racing ===
(key)

==== Continental Tire SportsCar Challenge results ====
Year	Team	Make	Engine	Class	1	2	3	4	5	6	7	8	9	10	11	12	Rank	Points
2006	Kensai Racing	Acura RSX		ST	VIR; DNP	LAG; 4	PHX; DNP	LRP; DNP	MOH; DNF	BAR; 26	CTR; 9	MIL; 11	VIR; DNP					
2007	Kensai Racing	Acura TSX		ST	DAY; 1	MOH; 29	MIA; 4	IA; 11	LAG; 1	LRP; 21	MOS; 1	WAT; 1	BAR; 7	CTR; 2	MIL; 7	VIR; 12	2nd	299
2008	Motorsport Technology Group	Porsche 997		GS	DAY; 30	LRP	MOS	MOH	WAT	BAR	IA	CTR	NJ	MIL	VIR		7th	209
2008	Motorsport Technology Group	BMW Z4 (E85)		GS	DAY	LRP; 14	MOS; 3	MOH; DNP	WAT; 15	BAR; 6	IA	CTR	NJ; 2	MIL	VIR; 24		7th	209
2008	Rehagen Racing	Ford Mustang FR500C		GS	DAY	LRP	MOS	MOH	WAT	BAR	IA; 10	CTR; 3	NJ	MIL; 3	VIR		7th	209
2009	Motorsport Technology Group	Porsche 997		GS	DAY; 4	MIA; 1	NJ; 3	LAG; 14	LRP; DNP	WAT	MOH	BAR	CTR	MIL	VIR		8th	231
2009	Horsepower Ranch	Ford Mustang FR500C		GS	DAY	MIA	NJ	LAG	LRP; DNP	WAT; 9	MOH; 16	BAR; 3	CTR; 2	MIL; 1	VIR; 9		8th	231
2010	Roush Performance	Ford Mustang FR500C		GS	DAY; 1	MIA; 1	BAR; 2	VIR; 5	LRP; 2	WAT; 5	MOH; 4	NJ; 1	CTR; 2	MIL; 2			3rd	272
2011	Roush Performance	Ford Mustang Boss 302R		GS	DAY; DNP	MIA; 2	BAR; 3	VIR; 1	LRP; 3	WAT; 1	ELK; 2	LAG; 22	NJ; 1	MOH; 2			2nd	267
2012	Roush Performance	Ford Mustang Boss 302R		GS	DAY; 1	BAR; 21	MIA; 5	NJ; 22	MOH; 1	ELK; 2	WAT; 21	IMS; 23	LAG; DNP	LRP; 5			12th	183
2013	Roush Performance	Ford Mustang Boss 302R		GS	DAY; 1	COA; DNF	BAR; 18	ATL; 6	MOH; 19	WAT; 21	IMS; 2	ELK; 11	KAN; 16	LAG; 15	LRP; 1		7th	219
2014	Multimatic Motorsports	Ford Mustang Boss 302R		GS	DAY; 9	SEB; 17	LAG; 10	LRP; 26	KAN; 10	WAT; DNF	MOS; 2	IMS; 9	ELK; 9	VIR; 15	COA; 3	ATL; 1	10th	235
2015	Multimatic Motorsports	Ford Mustang Boss 302R		GS	DAY; 5	SEB; 9	LAG; 2	WAT; 7	MOS; DNF	LRP; 1	ELK; 12	VIR; 6	COA; 2	ATL; 4			3rd	265
2016	Multimatic Motorsports	Ford Shelby GT350R-C		GS	DAY; 1	SEB; 2	LAG; 4	WAT; 4	MOS; 1	LRP; 1	ELK; 1	VIR; 2	COA; 1	ATL; 1			1st	330

==== Complete FIA World Endurance Championship results ====
(key) (Races in bold indicate pole position; races in italics indicate fastest lap)

Year	Entrant	Class	Car	Engine	1	2	3	4	5	6	7	8	9	Rank	Points
2016	Ford Chip Ganassi Team UK	LMGTE Pro	Ford GT	Ford 3.5 L Turbo V6	SIL; 5	SPA; Ret	LMS; 4	NÜR	MEX	COA	FUJ	SHA	BHR	9th	60
2017	Ford Chip Ganassi Team UK	LMGTE Pro	Ford GT	Ford 3.5 L Turbo V6	SIL; 4	SPA; 3	LMS; 10	NÜR	MEX	COA	FUJ	SHA	BHR	12th	43
2018–19	Ford Chip Ganassi Team UK	LMGTE Pro	Ford GT	Ford 3.5 L Turbo V6	**SPA**; 1	LMS; 3	SIL	FUJ	SHA	SEB; 18	SPA	LMS; 4		7th	67

^{*} Season still in progress.

==== 24 Hours of Le Mans results ====
Year	Team	Co-Drivers	Car	Class	Laps	Pos.	Class Pos.
2016	(United States) Ford Chip Ganassi Team UK	(Germany) Stefan Mücke (France) Olivier Pla	Ford GT	GTE; Pro	339	21st	4th
2017	(United States) Ford Chip Ganassi Team UK	(Germany) Stefan Mücke (France) Olivier Pla	Ford GT	GTE; Pro	332	27th	10th
2018	(United States) Ford Chip Ganassi Team UK	(Germany) Stefan Mücke (France) Olivier Pla	Ford GT	GTE; Pro	340	21st	6th
2019	(United States) Ford Chip Ganassi Team UK	(Germany) Stefan Mücke (France) Olivier Pla	Ford GT	GTE; Pro	340	25th	6th

==== Complete British GT Championship results ====
(key) (Races in bold indicate pole position) (Races in italics indicate fastest lap)

Year	Team	Car	Class	1	2	3	4	5	6	7	8	9	DC	Points
2019	Multimatic Motorsports	Ford Mustang GT4	GT4	OUL; 1	OUL; 2	SNE; 1	SNE; 2	SIL	DON; 18	SPA	BRH	DON	17th	18

=== NASCAR ===
(key) (Bold – Pole position awarded by qualifying time. Italics – Pole position earned by points standings or practice time. * – Most laps led.)

==== Monster Energy Cup Series ====
Monster Energy NASCAR Cup Series results
Year	Team	No.	Make	1	2	3	4	5	6	7	8	9	10	11	12	13	14	15	16	17	18	19	20	21	22	23	24	25	26	27	28	29	30	31	32	33	34	35	36	MENCC	Pts	Ref
2017	Richard Petty Motorsports	43	Ford	DAY	ATL	LVS	PHO	CAL	MAR	TEX	BRI	RCH	TAL	KAN	CLT	DOV	POC	MCH	SON; 22	DAY	KEN	NHA	IND	POC	GLN	MCH	BRI	DAR	RCH	CHI	NHA	DOV	CLT	TAL	KAN	MAR	TEX	PHO	HOM	40th	15	

==== Nationwide Series ====
NASCAR Nationwide Series results
Year	Team	No.	Make	1	2	3	4	5	6	7	8	9	10	11	12	13	14	15	16	17	18	19	20	21	22	23	24	25	26	27	28	29	30	31	32	33	34	35	NNSC	Pts	Ref
2010	Roush Fenway Racing	6	Ford	DAY	CAL	LVS	BRI	NSH	PHO	TEX	TAL	RCH	DAR	DOV	CLT	NSH	KEN	ROA	NHA	DAY	CHI	GTY	IRP	IOW	GLN; 36	MCH	BRI	CGV	ATL	RCH	DOV	KAN	CAL	CLT	GTY	TEX	PHO	HOM	137th	55	
2011	Roush Fenway Racing	60	Ford	DAY	PHO	LVS	BRI	CAL	TEX	TAL	NSH	RCH	DAR	DOV	IOW	CLT	CHI	MCH	ROA; 33	DAY	KEN	NHA	NSH	IRP	IOW	GLN	CGV; QL^{†}	BRI	ATL	RCH	CHI	DOV	KAN	CLT	TEX	PHO	HOM		84th	11	
2012	Roush Fenway Racing	60	Ford	DAY	PHO	LVS	BRI	CAL	TEX	RCH	TAL	DAR	IOW	CLT	DOV	MCH	ROA	KEN	DAY	NHA	CHI	IND	IOW	GLN	CGV; 8	BRI	ATL	RCH	CHI	KEN	DOV	CLT	KAN	TEX	PHO	HOM			70th	36	
2013	Roush Fenway Racing	16	Ford	DAY	PHO	LVS	BRI	CAL	TEX	RCH	TAL	DAR	CLT	DOV	IOW	MCH	ROA; 15	KEN	DAY	NHA; 15	CHI	IND	IOW	GLN	MOH	BRI	ATL	RCH	CHI	KEN	DOV	KAN	CLT	TEX	PHO	HOM			54th	59	
^{†} – Qualified for Carl Edwards.

^{*} Season still in progress
^{1} Ineligible for series points
