= 2016 Continental Tire SportsCar Challenge =

Motor racing competition

The 2016 Continental Tire SportsCar Challenge was the seventeenth season of the Continental Tire SportsCar Challenge and the third season organized by the International Motor Sports Association (IMSA).

== Classes ==
The class structure remained unchanged from 2015.

- Grand Sport (GS)
- Street Tuner (ST)

== Schedule ==
The 2016 schedule was released on August 8, 2015 and features ten rounds. Every race will be 2 hours and 30 minutes in length and will feature both the GS and ST classes. All races will be televised by FOX Sports on a tape-delayed basis and streamed live on IMSA TV. There was also a test session before the beginning of the season: The Roar Before the 24 at Daytona from January 8 to January 10.

Rnd	Race	Circuit	Location	Date
1	BMW Performance 200	Daytona International Speedway	Daytona Beach, Florida	January 29
2	Sebring 150	Sebring International Raceway	Sebring, Florida	March 18
3	Continental Monterey Grand Prix powered by Mazda	Mazda Raceway Laguna Seca	Monterey, California	April 30
4	Continental Tire 150 at the Glen	Watkins Glen International	Watkins Glen, New York	July 2
5	Mobil 1 Sportscar Grand Prix Presented by Hawk Performance	Canadian Tire Motorsport Park	Bowmanville, Ontario	July 9
6	Northeast Grand Prix	Lime Rock Park	Lakeville, Connecticut	July 23
7	Continental Tire Road Race Showcase	Road America	Elkhart Lake, Wisconsin	August 6
8	Oak Tree Grand Prix at VIR	Virginia International Raceway	Alton, Virginia	August 27
9	Circuit of the Americas 150	Circuit of the Americas	Austin, Texas	September 16
10	Road Atlanta 150	Road Atlanta	Braselton, Georgia	September 30

== Entry list ==
=== Grand Sport ===
Team	Car	No.	Drivers	Rounds
(United States) Automatic Racing	Aston Martin V8 Vantage GT4	09	(United States) Charles Espenlaub	4, 8–10
(United States) Automatic Racing	Aston Martin V8 Vantage GT4	09	(United States) Charlie Putman	4, 8–10
(United States) Automatic Racing	Aston Martin V8 Vantage GT4	09	(United States) Al Carter	7
(United States) Automatic Racing	Aston Martin V8 Vantage GT4	09	(United States) Andrew Hobbs	7
(United States) Automatic Racing	Aston Martin V8 Vantage GT4	99	(United States) Rob Ecklin, Jr.	1–4, 6, 8–9
(United States) Automatic Racing	Aston Martin V8 Vantage GT4	99	(United States) Al Carter	1–4
(United States) Automatic Racing	Aston Martin V8 Vantage GT4	99	(United States) Peter Ludwig	6
(United States) Automatic Racing	Aston Martin V8 Vantage GT4	99	(United States) Charles Espenlaub	7
(United States) Automatic Racing	Aston Martin V8 Vantage GT4	99	(United States) Charlie Putman	7
(United States) Automatic Racing	Aston Martin V8 Vantage GT4	99	(United States) Sebastian Landy	8
(United States) Automatic Racing	Aston Martin V8 Vantage GT4	99	(United States) Joe Foster	9
(United States) Bodymotion Racing	Porsche Cayman GT4 Clubsport	12	(Canada) Cameron Cassels	2–10
(United States) Bodymotion Racing	Porsche Cayman GT4 Clubsport	12	(United States) Trent Hindman	2–10
(United States) CJ Wilson Racing	Porsche Cayman GT4 Clubsport	33	(Canada) Daniel Burkett	All
(United States) CJ Wilson Racing	Porsche Cayman GT4 Clubsport	33	(United States) Marc Miller	All
(United States) CJ Wilson Racing	Porsche Cayman GT4 Clubsport	35	(United Kingdom) Till Bechtolsheimer	2–4, 6–7, 10
(United States) CJ Wilson Racing	Porsche Cayman GT4 Clubsport	35	(United States) Tyler McQuarrie	2–4, 6, 10
(United States) CJ Wilson Racing	Porsche Cayman GT4 Clubsport	35	(United States) Justin Piscitell	7
(Canada) C360R	Ford Shelby GT350R-C	76	(United States) Paul Holton	All
(Canada) C360R	Ford Shelby GT350R-C	76	(Brazil) Pierre Kleinubing	All
(Belgium) Mühlner Motorsports America	Porsche Cayman GT4 Clubsport	21	(Netherlands) Jeroen Bleekemolen	1–2, 7, 9–10
(Belgium) Mühlner Motorsports America	Porsche Cayman GT4 Clubsport	21	(United States) Bob Doyle	1
(Belgium) Mühlner Motorsports America	Porsche Cayman GT4 Clubsport	21	(United States) Dennis Trebing	2
(Belgium) Mühlner Motorsports America	Porsche Cayman GT4 Clubsport	21	(United States) Peter Ludwig	7, 9–10
(Canada) Multimatic Motorsports	Ford Shelby GT350R-C	15	(United States) Billy Johnson	All
(Canada) Multimatic Motorsports	Ford Shelby GT350R-C	15	(Canada) Scott Maxwell	All
(United States) Racers Edge Motorsports	Ford Mustang Boss 302R	16	(United States) Chris Beaufait	1
(United States) Racers Edge Motorsports	Ford Mustang Boss 302R	16	(United Kingdom) Paddy McClughan	1
(United States) Racers Edge Motorsports	Ford Mustang Boss 302R	57	(United States) Michael Lira	1
(United States) Racers Edge Motorsports	Ford Mustang Boss 302R	57	(United States) Cameron Maugeri	1
(United States) Rebel Rock Racing	Porsche 997	6	(United States) Frank Depew	2
(United States) Rebel Rock Racing	Porsche 997	6	(United States) Jim Jonsin	2
(United States) Rebel Rock Racing	Porsche 997	6	(United States) Elliott Skeer	2
(United States) Rebel Rock Racing	Porsche 997	6	(United States) Casey Carden	10
(United States) Rebel Rock Racing	Porsche 997	6	(United States) Ethan Low	10
(United States) Rum Bum Racing	Porsche 997	13	(United States) Hugh Plumb	1–2
(United States) Rum Bum Racing	Porsche 997	13	(United States) Matt Plumb	1–2
(United States) Team TGM	Porsche Cayman GT4 Clubsport	46	(United States) Ted Giovanis	4, 6–10
(United States) Team TGM	Porsche Cayman GT4 Clubsport	46	(United States) David Murry	4, 6
(United States) Team TGM	Porsche Cayman GT4 Clubsport	46	(United States) Guy Cosmo	7–10
(United States) Team TGM	Porsche Cayman GT4 Clubsport	64	(United States) Ted Giovanis	2–3, 6–10
(United States) Team TGM	Porsche Cayman GT4 Clubsport	64	(United States) David Murry	2–3, 6
(United States) Team TGM	Porsche Cayman GT4 Clubsport	64	(United States) Guy Cosmo	7–10

=== Street Tuner ===
Team	Car	No.	Drivers	Rounds
(United States) Alara Racing	Mazda MX-5	34	(United States) Christian Szymczak	1–5, 7–10
(United States) Alara Racing	Mazda MX-5	34	(United States) Justin Piscitell	1–2
(United States) Alara Racing	Mazda MX-5	34	(United States) Cavan O'Keefe	3
(United States) Alara Racing	Mazda MX-5	34	(United States) Bob Stretch	4–5
(United States) Alara Racing	Mazda MX-5	34	(United States) Drake Kemper	7, 9–10
(United States) Alara Racing	Mazda MX-5	34	(United States) Ethan Low	8
(United States) Alara Racing	Mazda MX-5	43	(United States) Terry Borcheller	8–9
(United States) Alara Racing	Mazda MX-5	43	(United States) Mike LaMarra	8–9
(United States) BimmerWorld Racing	BMW 328i (F30)	81	(United States) Jerry Kaufman	All
(United States) BimmerWorld Racing	BMW 328i (F30)	81	(United Kingdom) Kyle Tilley	All
(United States) BimmerWorld Racing	BMW 328i (F30)	84	(United States) James Clay	All
(United States) BimmerWorld Racing	BMW 328i (F30)	84	(United States) Tyler Cooke	All
(United States) Bodymotion Racing	Porsche Cayman	31	(United States) Devin Jones	All
(United States) Bodymotion Racing	Porsche Cayman	31	(United States) Jason Rabe	All
(Canada) C360R	Audi S3	74	(United States) Jim McGuire	All
(Canada) C360R	Audi S3	74	(France) Nico Rondet	All
(Canada) C360R	Audi S3	75	(United States) Roy Block	1–8
(Canada) C360R	Audi S3	75	(United States) Kyle Gimple	1–4
(Canada) C360R	Audi S3	75	(United States) Tom Dyer	5–8
(Canada) C360R	Audi S3	75	(Canada) Jayson Clunie	7, 9–10
(Canada) C360R	Audi S3	75	(United States) Matthew Keegan	9–10
(United States) CRG - I Do Borrow	Honda Civic Si (Rounds 1–3); Nissan Altima Coupe (Rounds 4–10)	44	(United States) Sarah Cattaneo	All
(United States) CRG - I Do Borrow	Honda Civic Si (Rounds 1–3); Nissan Altima Coupe (Rounds 4–10)	44	(United States) Owen Trinkler	All
(United States) Freedom Autosport	Mazda MX-5	25	(United Kingdom) Stevan McAleer	All
(United States) Freedom Autosport	Mazda MX-5	25	(United States) Chad McCumbee	All
(United States) Freedom Autosport	Mazda MX-5	26	(United States) Andrew Carbonell	All
(United States) Freedom Autosport	Mazda MX-5	26	(United States) Liam Dwyer	All
(United States) Freedom Autosport	Mazda MX-5	27	(Canada) Danny Bender	All
(United States) Freedom Autosport	Mazda MX-5	27	(United States) Britt Casey, Jr.	All
(United States) HART	Honda Civic Si	92	(United States) Steve Eich	1–4, 6–7, 9–10
(United States) HART	Honda Civic Si	92	(United States) Kevin Boehm	1, 3–5, 8–10
(United States) HART	Honda Civic Si	92	(United States) Cameron Lawrence	2, 5–8
(United States) HART	Honda Civic Si	93	(United States) Chad Gilsinger	All
(United States) HART	Honda Civic Si	93	(Canada) Michael Valiante	1–2
(United States) HART	Honda Civic Si	93	(United States) Cameron Lawrence	3, 9–10
(United States) HART	Honda Civic Si	93	(United States) Ryan Eversley	4–8
(United States) JDC-Miller Motorsports	BMW 228i	54	(United States) Michael Johnson	3–10
(United States) JDC-Miller Motorsports	BMW 228i	54	(South Africa) Stephen Simpson	3–10
(United States) Kris Wright Racing w/ Goldcrest Motorsports	Porsche Cayman	22	(United States) Andy Lee	1–9
(United States) Kris Wright Racing w/ Goldcrest Motorsports	Porsche Cayman	22	(United States) Kris Wright	1–9
(Dominican Republic) LRT Racing	Honda Civic Si	4	(Dominican Republic) Jorge Leroux	1
(Dominican Republic) LRT Racing	Honda Civic Si	4	(Dominican Republic) Juan Carlos Leroux	1
(United Kingdom) MINI JCW Team	Mini Cooper JCW	37	(United States) Ethan Low	1–7
(United Kingdom) MINI JCW Team	Mini Cooper JCW	37	(United States) Mark Pombo	1–4, 7–8, 10
(United Kingdom) MINI JCW Team	Mini Cooper JCW	37	(Canada) James Vance	5–6
(United Kingdom) MINI JCW Team	Mini Cooper JCW	37	(United States) Austin Mack	8
(United Kingdom) MINI JCW Team	Mini Cooper JCW	37	(United States) Nathan Norenberg	9–10
(United Kingdom) MINI JCW Team	Mini Cooper JCW	37	(United States) Tyler Stone	9
(United Kingdom) MINI JCW Team	Mini Cooper JCW	52	(United States) Ramin Abdolvahabi	All
(United Kingdom) MINI JCW Team	Mini Cooper JCW	52	(Canada) James Vance	1–4
(United Kingdom) MINI JCW Team	Mini Cooper JCW	52	(United States) Nathan Norenberg	5, 7
(United Kingdom) MINI JCW Team	Mini Cooper JCW	52	(United States) Tyler Stone	6, 8, 10
(United Kingdom) MINI JCW Team	Mini Cooper JCW	52	(United States) Mark Pombo	9
(United Kingdom) MINI JCW Team	Mini Cooper JCW	73	(United States) Derek Jones	All
(United Kingdom) MINI JCW Team	Mini Cooper JCW	73	(United States) Mat Pombo	All
(United States) Murillo Racing	Porsche Cayman	56	(United States) Eric Foss	All
(United States) Murillo Racing	Porsche Cayman	56	(United States) Jeff Mosing	All
(United States) Murillo Racing	BMW 328i (E90)	65	(United States) Brent Mosing	All
(United States) Murillo Racing	BMW 328i (E90)	65	(United States) Tim Probert	All
(United States) Murillo Racing	BMW 328i (E90)	65	(United States) Justin Piscitell	1–3, 5–6
(United States) Next Level European	Porsche Cayman	38	(United States) Dan Rogers	All
(United States) Next Level European	Porsche Cayman	38	(United States) Seth Thomas	All
(United States) Next Level European	Porsche Cayman	83	(United States) Ari Balogh	All
(United States) Next Level European	Porsche Cayman	83	(United States) Greg Liefooghe	All
(United States) Rebel Rock Racing	Porsche Cayman	7	(United States) Jim Jonsin	1
(United States) Rebel Rock Racing	Porsche Cayman	7	(United States) Mike Mathe	1
(United States) Rebel Rock Racing	Porsche Cayman	7	(United States) Sam Adams	2, 4–5, 7
(United States) Rebel Rock Racing	Porsche Cayman	7	(United Kingdom) Ian James	2
(United States) Rebel Rock Racing	Porsche Cayman	7	(United States) Bryan Leonard	3
(United States) Rebel Rock Racing	Porsche Cayman	7	(United States) Tyler Stone	3
(United States) Rebel Rock Racing	Porsche Cayman	7	(United States) Elliott Skeer	4–5, 7
(United States) Rebel Rock Racing	Porsche Cayman	7	(United States) Lee Carpentier	6, 10
(United States) Rebel Rock Racing	Porsche Cayman	7	(Cayman Islands) Kieron O'Rourke	6, 10
(United States) Rebel Rock Racing	Porsche Cayman	7	(United States) Frank DePew	8–9
(United States) Rebel Rock Racing	Porsche Cayman	7	(United States) Brandon Davis	8
(United States) Rebel Rock Racing	Porsche Cayman	7	(United States) Sean Rayhall	9
(United States) Rebel Rock Racing	Porsche Cayman	8	(United Kingdom) Robin Liddell	All
(United States) Rebel Rock Racing	Porsche Cayman	8	(United States) Elliott Skeer	1–3
(United States) Rebel Rock Racing	Porsche Cayman	8	(United States) Theo Bean	4–10
(United States) Riley Racing	Mazda MX-5	66	(United States) A. J. Riley	1, 6
(United States) Riley Racing	Mazda MX-5	66	(United States) Jameson Riley	1, 6
(United States) RS1	Porsche Cayman	17	(United States) Nick Galante	All
(United States) RS1	Porsche Cayman	17	(United States) Spencer Pumpelly	All
(United States) RS1	Porsche Cayman	18	(Canada) Remo Ruscitti	1–3, 5
(United States) RS1	Porsche Cayman	18	(United States) Aaron Song	1–3
(United States) RS1	Porsche Cayman	18	(United States) Justin Piscitell	4
(United States) RS1	Porsche Cayman	18	(United States) Aurora Straus	4
(United States) RS1	Porsche Cayman	18	(United States) Dillon Machavern	5–7, 9–10
(United States) RS1	Porsche Cayman	18	(United States) Phil Bloom	6, 8
(United States) RS1	Porsche Cayman	18	(United States) Josh Bilicki	7
(United States) RS1	Porsche Cayman	18	(United States) Andy Lally	8
(United States) RS1	Porsche Cayman	18	(United States) Dylan Murcott	9–10
(United States) RS1	Porsche Cayman	19	(United States) Connor Bloum	All
(United States) RS1	Porsche Cayman	19	(United States) Greg Strelzoff	All
(United States) Schmidt Motorsports	Mercedes-Benz C 300	5	(United States) Mitch Cobb	1
(United States) Schmidt Motorsports	Mercedes-Benz C 300	5	(United States) James Rowen	1
(United States) Strategic Wealth Racing	Porsche Cayman	36	(United States) Matthew Dicken	All
(United States) Strategic Wealth Racing	Porsche Cayman	36	(United States) Corey Lewis	All

== Race results ==
Bold indicates overall winner.

Rnd	Circuit	GS Winning Team	ST Winning Team
Rnd	Circuit	GS Winning Drivers	ST Winning Drivers
1	Daytona	(Canada) **#15 Multimatic Motorsports**	(United States) #56 Murillo Racing
1	Daytona	(United States) **Billy Johnson** **(Canada) Scott Maxwell**	(United States) Eric Foss (United States) Jeff Mosing
2	Sebring	(United States) **#12 Bodymotion Racing**	(United States) #44 CRG - I Do Borrow
2	Sebring	(Canada) **Cameron Cassels** **(United States) Trent Hindman**	(United States) Sarah Cattaneo (United States) Owen Trinkler
3	Laguna Seca	(United States) **#12 Bodymotion Racing**	(United States) #25 Freedom Autosport
3	Laguna Seca	(Canada) **Cameron Cassels** **(United States) Trent Hindman**	(United Kingdom) Stevan McAleer (United States) Chad McCumbee
4	Watkins Glen	(United States) **#12 Bodymotion Racing**	(United States) #17 RS1
4	Watkins Glen	(Canada) **Cameron Cassels** **(United States) Trent Hindman**	(United States) Nick Galante (United States) Spencer Pumpelly
5	Mosport	(Canada) **#15 Multimatic Motorsports**	(United States) #44 CRG - I Do Borrow
5	Mosport	(United States) **Billy Johnson** **(Canada) Scott Maxwell**	(United States) Sarah Cattaneo (United States) Owen Trinkler
6	Lime Rock	(Canada) **#15 Multimatic Motorsports**	(United States) #25 Freedom Autosport
6	Lime Rock	(United States) **Billy Johnson** **(Canada) Scott Maxwell**	(United Kingdom) Stevan McAleer (United States) Chad McCumbee
7	Road America	(Canada) **#15 Multimatic Motorsports**	(United States) #17 RS1
7	Road America	(United States) **Billy Johnson** **(Canada) Scott Maxwell**	(United States) Nick Galante (United States) Spencer Pumpelly
8	VIR	(United States) **#33 CJ Wilson Racing**	(United States) #93 HART
8	VIR	(Canada) **Daniel Burkett** **(United States) Marc Miller**	(United States) Ryan Eversley (United States) Chad Gilsinger
9	Austin	(Canada) **#15 Multimatic Motorsports**	(United States) #56 Murillo Racing
9	Austin	(United States) **Billy Johnson** **(Canada) Scott Maxwell**	(United States) Eric Foss (United States) Jeff Mosing
10	Road Atlanta	(Canada) **#15 Multimatic Motorsports**	(United States) #17 RS1
10	Road Atlanta	(United States) **Billy Johnson** **(Canada) Scott Maxwell**	(United States) Nick Galante (United States) Spencer Pumpelly

== Championship standings ==
=== Points system ===
Championship points are awarded in each class at the finish of each event. Points are awarded based on finishing positions as shown in the chart below.

Position	1	2	3	4	5	6	7	8	9	10	11	12	13	14	15	16	17	18	19	20	21	22	23	24	25	26	27	28	29	30
Race	35	32	30	28	26	25	24	23	22	21	20	19	18	17	16	15	14	13	12	11	10	9	8	7	6	5	4	3	2	1

=== Drivers' Championships ===
==== Grand Sport ====
Pos.	Driver	DAY	SEB	LGA	WGL	MOS	LIM	ELK	VIR	AUS	ATL	Points
1	(United States) Billy Johnson	1	2	4	4	1	1	1	2	1	1	330
1	(Canada) Scott Maxwell	1	**2**	4	**4**	**1**	1	**1**	2	**1**	**1**	330
2	(Canada) Daniel Burkett	3	7	**2**	3	2	**2**	6	1	7	2	296
2	(United States) Marc Miller	3	7	2	3	2	2	6	1	7	2	296
3	(Canada) Cameron Cassels		1	1	1	4	3	5	3	2	8	274
3	(United States) Trent Hindman		1	1	1	4	3	5	3	2	8	274
4	(United States) Paul Holton	2	4	6	6	3	7	8†	6	3	4	247
4	(Brazil) Pierre Kleinubing	2	4	6	6	3	7	8†	6	3	4	247
5	(United States) Ted Giovanis		8	7	7		6	3	7	8	6	198
6	(United States) Rob Ecklin, Jr.	4	10	5	5		5		5	5		179
7	(United Kingdom) Till Bechtolsheimer		5	3	2		4	9†			5	142
7	(United States) Tyler McQuarrie		5	3	2		4				5	142
8	(United States) Charles Espenlaub				8			4	4	6	3	134
8	(United States) Charlie Putman				8			4	4	6	3	134
9	(United States) Al Carter	4	10	5	5			7				125
10	(Netherlands) Jeroen Bleekemolen	6	6					2		4	DNS	110
11	(United States) Guy Cosmo							3	7	8	6	102
12	(United States) David Murry		8	7	7		6					96
13	(United States) Peter Ludwig						5	2		4	DNS	86
14	(United States) Hugh Plumb	**5**	3									56
14	(United States) Matt Plumb	5	3									56
15	(United States) Sebastian Landy								**5**			26
16	(United States) Joe Foster									5		26
17	(United States) Bob Doyle	6										25
18	(United States) Dennis Trebing		6									25
19	(United States) Michael Lira	7										24
19	(United States) Cameron Maugeri	7										24
20	(United States) Andrew Hobbs							7				24
21	(United States) Casey Carden										7	24
21	(United States) Ethan Low										7	24
22	(United States) Chris Beaufait	8										23
22	(United Kingdom) Paddy McClughan	8										23
23	(United States) Frank Depew		9									22
24	(United States) Jim Jonsin		9†									0
24	(United States) Elliott Skeer		9†									0
24	(United States) Justin Piscitell							9†				0

Colour	Result
Gold	Winner
Silver	Second place
Bronze	Third place
Green	Points classification
Blue	Non-points classification
Blue	Non-classified finish (NC)
Purple	Retired, not classified (Ret)
Red	Did not qualify (DNQ)
Red	Did not pre-qualify (DNPQ)
Black	Disqualified (DSQ)
White	Did not start (DNS)
White	Withdrew (WD)
White	Race cancelled (C)
Blank	Did not practice (DNP)
Blank	Did not arrive (DNA)
Blank	Excluded (EX)

**Bold** - Pole position
Italics - Fastest lap

Notes

- Drivers denoted by † did not complete sufficient laps in order to score points.

==== Street Tuner ====
Pos.	Driver	DAY	SEB	LGA	WGL	MOS	LIM	ELK	VIR	AUS	ATL	Points
1	(United States) Nick Galante	2	10	6	1	2	4	1	16	21	1	268
1	(United States) Spencer Pumpelly	2	10	6	1	2	4	1	16	21	1	268
2	(United States) Eric Foss	1	21	3	22	5	5	3	3	1	6	256
2	(United States) Jeff Mosing	1	21	3	22	5	5	3	3	1	6	256
3	(United States) Chad Gilsinger	7	2	5	21	3	26†	2	1	2	2	253
4	(United Kingdom) Stevan McAleer	16	4	1	4	6	1	4	8	7	20	252
4	(United States) Chad McCumbee	16	4	1	4	6	**1**	4	8	7	20	252
5	(United States) Devin Jones	21	5	9	2	9	9	8	6	5	9	230
5	(United States) Jason Rabe	21	5	9	2	9	9	8	6	5	**9**	230
6	(United States) Connor Bloum	10	9	12	5	18	8	23	5	3	3	219
6	(United States) Greg Strelzoff	10	9	12	5	18	8	23	5	3	3	219
7	(United States) Derek Jones	12	16	14	**15**	4	17	7	4	6	5	213
7	(United States) Mat Pombo	12	16	14	15	4	17	7	4	6	5	213
8	(United States) Cameron Lawrence		7	5		7	7	13	7	2	7	196
9	(Canada) Danny Bender	13	12	8	18	14	12	9	10	4	21	190
9	(United States) Britt Casey, Jr.	13	12	8	18	14	12	9	10	4	21	190
10	(United States) Matthew Dicken	5	18	16	3	21	15	10	19	14	10	182
10	(United States) Corey Lewis	5	18	16	3	21	15	10	19	14	10	182
11	(United States) James Clay	25	3	**4**	6	**11**	6	15	13	27†	19	180
11	(United States) Tyler Cooke	25	**3**	4	6	11	6	15	13	**27**†	19	180
12	(United States) Andrew Carbonell	22	22	2	24	10	3	5	17	23	13	174
12	(United States) Liam Dwyer	22	22	2	24	10	3	5	17	23	13	174
13	(United Kingdom) Robin Liddell	3	14	26†	9	23	18	11	12	25	8	158
14	(United States) Ari Balogh	4	8	17	25	26	24	14	2	22	16	157
14	(United States) Greg Liefooghe	4	8	17	25	26	24	14	2	22	16	157
15	(United States) Christian Szymczak	8	11	22	27†	19	2	18	11	24	18	150
16	(United States) Andy Lee	11	6	13	16	12	25	**21**	14	12		150
16	(United States) Kris Wright	11	6	13	16	12	25	21	14	12		150
17	(United States) Sarah Cattaneo	6	1	18	20	1	28†	19	26	20	24†	148
17	(United States) Owen Trinkler	6	1	18	20	1	28†	19	26	20	24†	148
18	(United Kingdom) Kyle Tilley	18	13	20	10	15	14	DNS	21	15	12	142
19	(United States) Dan Rogers	9	24	24	23	16	19	22	9	8	17	140
19	(United States) Seth Thomas	9	24	24	23	16	19	22	9	8	17	140
20	(United States) Ryan Eversley				21	3	26†	2	1		2	139
21	(United States) Ramin Abdolvahabi	15	17	21	17	24	21	12	22	9	15	138
22	(United States) Kevin Boehm	24		10	7	7			**7**	18	7	137
23	(United States) Steve Eich	24	7	10	7		7	13		18		131
24	(United States) Justin Piscitell	8	11	7	8	27†	11				11	130
25	(United States) Jerry Kaufman	18†	13	20	10	15	14	DNS	21	15	12	129
26	(France) Nico Rondet	23	DNS	15	13	17	23	6	23	11	23	126
27	(United States) Tim Probert	14	15	7	12	27†	11	DNS	24	28†	14	120
28	(United States) Jim McGuire	23	DNS	15	13	17	23	6	23	11	23†	118
29	(United States) Theo Bean				9	23	18	11	12	25	8	111
30	(United States) Elliott Skeer	**3**	14	26†	11	13		17				99
31	(United States) Mark Pombo	20	20	23	26†			20	27	9	4	96
32	(United States) Ethan Low	20	20	23	26†	20	13	20	11			91
33	(Canada) James Vance	15	17	21	17	20	13					84
34	(United States) Brent Mosing	14	15	7†	12	27†	11†	DNS	24	28†	14	76
35	(United States) Nate Norenberg					24		12		10	4	75
36	(United States) Roy Block	DNS	23	19	14	25	20	16	28†		25†	70
37	(United States) Tyler Stone			25			21		22	10	15	63
38	(United States) Dillon Machavern					8	10	25†		13		62
39	(United States) Terry Borcheller						2		18	17		59
40	(United States) Michael Johnson			27†	19	22	16	24	15	26†	DNS	59
40	(South Africa) Stephen Simpson			27†	19	22	16	24	15	26†	DNS	59
41	(United States) Sam Adams		25		11	13		17				58
42	(Canada) Michael Valiante	7	2									56
43	(Canada) Remo Ruscitti	19	19	11^{1}		8						47
44	(United States) Aurora Straus				8						11	43
45	(United States) Kyle Gimple	DNS	23	19	14							38
46	(United States) Drake Kemper							18		24	18	33
47	(United States) Philip Bloom						10		20			32
48	(Canada) Jayson Clunie							16		16		30
49	(United States) Mike LaMarra								18	17		27
50	(United States) Aaron Song	19	19	11†								24
51	(United States) Dylan Murcott									13		18
52	(United States) Frank DePew								25	19		18
53	(United States) Lee Carpentier						22				22	18
53	(Cayman Islands) Kieron O'Rourke						22				22	18
54	(United States) Tom Dyer					25	20		28†		25†	17
55	(United States) Matthew Keegan									16		15
56	(United States) A. J. Riley	17					27†					14
56	(United States) Jameson Riley	17					27†					14
57	(United States) Bob Stretch				27†	19						12
58	(United States) Sean Rayhall									19		12
59	(United States) Andy Lally								20			11
60	(United States) Cavan O'Keefe			22								10
61	(United States) Bryan Leonard			25								7
62	(United Kingdom) Ian James		25									6
62	(United States) Brandon Davis								25			6
64	(United States) Mitch Cobb	26										5
64	(United States) James Rowen	26										5
65	(United States) Jim Jonsin	27										4
65	(United States) Mike Mathe	27										4
66	(United States) Austin Mack								27			4
67	(United States) Josh Bilicki							25†				0
68	(Dominican Republic) Jorge Leroux	DSQ										0
68	(Dominican Republic) Juan Carlos Leroux	DSQ										0

Notes

- ^{1} – Remo Ruscitti was not able to score points as he exceeded the maximum drive-time limitation.
- Drivers denoted by † did not complete sufficient laps in order to score points.

=== Teams' Championships ===
==== Grand Sport ====
Pos.	Team	DAY	SEB	LGA	WGL	MOS	LIM	ELK	VIR	AUS	ATL	Points
1	#15 Multimatic Motorsports	1	**2**	4	**4**	**1**	1	**1**	2	**1**	**1**	330
2	#33 CJ Wilson Racing	3	7	**2**	3	2	**2**	6	1	7	2	296
3	#12 Bodymotion Racing		1	1	1	4	3	5	3	2	8	274
4	#76 Compass360 Racing	2	4	6	6	3	7	8	6	3	4	270
5	#99 Automatic Racing	4	10	5	5		5	4	**5**	5		207
6	#35 CJ Wilson Racing		5	3	2		4	9			5	164
7	#09 Automatic Racing				8			7	4	6	3	130
8	#64 Team TGM		8	7	DNS		6	3	DNS	DNS	6	127
9	#21 Mühlner Motorsports America	6	6					2		4	DNS	110
10	#46 Team TGM				7		DNS	DNS	7	8	DNS	71
11	#13 Rum Bum Racing	**5**	3									56
12	#6 Rebel Rock Racing		9								7	46
13	#57 Racers Edge Motorsports	7										24
14	#16 Racers Edge Motorsports	8										23

==== Street Tuner ====
Pos.	Team	DAY	SEB	LGA	WGL	MOS	LIM	ELK	VIR	AUS	ATL	Points
1	#17 RS1	2	10	6	1	2	4	1	16	21	1	268
2	#93 HART	7	2	5	21	3	26	2	1	2	2	258
3	#56 Murillo Racing	1	21	3	22	5	5	3	3	1	6	256
4	#25 Freedom Autosport	16	4	1	4	6	**1**	4	8	7	20	252
5	#31 Bodymotion Racing	21	5	9	2	9	9	8	6	5	**9**	230
6	#19 RS1	10	9	12	5	18	8	23	5	3	3	219
7	#73 MINI JCW Team	12	16	14	**15**	4	17	7	4	6	5	213
8	#92 HART	24	7	10	7	7	7	13	**7**	18	7	203
9	#27 Freedom Autosport	13	12	8	18	14	12	9	10	4	21	190
10	#84 BimmerWorld Racing	25	**3**	**4**	6	**11**	6	15	13	**27**	19	184
11	#36 Strategic Wealth Racing	5	18	16	3	21	15	10	19	14	10	182
12	#26 Freedom Autosport	22	22	2	24	10	3	5	17	23	13	174
13	#8 Rebel Rock Racing	**3**	14	26	9	23	18	11	12	25	8	164
14	#44 CRG - I Do Borrow	6	1	18	20	1	28	19	26	20	24	158
15	#83 Next Level European	4	8	17	25	26	24	14	2	22	16	157
16	#34 Alara Racing	8	11	22	27	19	2	18	11	24	18	154
17	#22 Kris Wright Racing w/ Goldcrest Motorsports	11	6	13	16	12	25	**21**	14	12		150
18	#18 RS1	19	19	11^{1}	8	8	10	25	20	13	11	146
19	#81 BimmerWorld Racing	18	13	20	10	15	14	DNS	21	15	12	142
20	#38 Next Level European	9	24	24	23	16	19	22	9	8	17	140
21	#52 MINI JCW Team	15	17	21	17	24	21	12	22	9	15	138
22	#37 MINI JCW Team	20	20	23	26	20	13	20	27	10	4	129
23	#65 Murillo Racing	14	15	7	12	27	11	DNS	24	28	14	127
24	#74 Compass360 Racing	23	DNS	15	13	17	23	6	23	11	23	126
25	#7 Rebel Rock Racing	27	25	25	11	13	22	17	25	19	22	105
26	#75 Compass360 Racing	DNS	23	19	14	25	20	16	28	16	25^{2}	88
27	#54 JDC-Miller Motorsports			27	19	22	16	24	15	26	DNS	69
28	#43 Alara Racing								18	17		27
29	#66 Riley Racing	17					27					14
30	#5 Schmidt Motorsports	26										5
31	#4 LRT Racing	DSQ										0

Notes

- ^{1} – #18 RS1 was not able to score points as driver Remo Ruscitti exceeded the maximum drive-time limitation.
- ^{2} – #75 C360R was not able to score points as driver Tom Dyer exceeded the maximum drive-time limitation.

=== Manufacturers' Championships ===
==== Grand Sport ====
Pos.	Manufacturer	DAY	SEB	LGA	WGL	MOS	LIM	ELK	VIR	AUS	ATL	Points
1	Ford	1	**2**	4	**4**	**1**	1	**1**	2	**1**	**1**	338
2	Porsche	**3**	1	**1**	1	2	**2**	2	1	2	2	332
3	Aston Martin	4	10	5	5		5	4	**4**	5	3	270

==== Street Tuner ====
Pos.	Manufacturer	DAY	SEB	LGA	WGL	MOS	LIM	ELK	VIR	AUS	ATL	Points
1	Porsche	**1**	5	3	1	2	4	**1**	2	1	**1**	334
2	Honda	6	1	5	7	3	7	2	**1**	2	2	314
3	Mazda	8	4	1	4	6	**1**	4	8	4	14	303
4	BMW	14	**3**	**4**	6	**11**	6	15	13	**15**	12	278
5	Mini	12	16	14	**15**	4	13	7	4	6	4	275
6	Audi	23	23	15	13	17	20	6	23	11	13	256
Manufacturers ineligible for championship points
	Nissan				20	1	28	19	26	20	24	0
	Mercedes-Benz	26										0

== See also ==
- 2016 WeatherTech SportsCar Championship
