= Elliott Skeer =

American racing driver (born 1994)

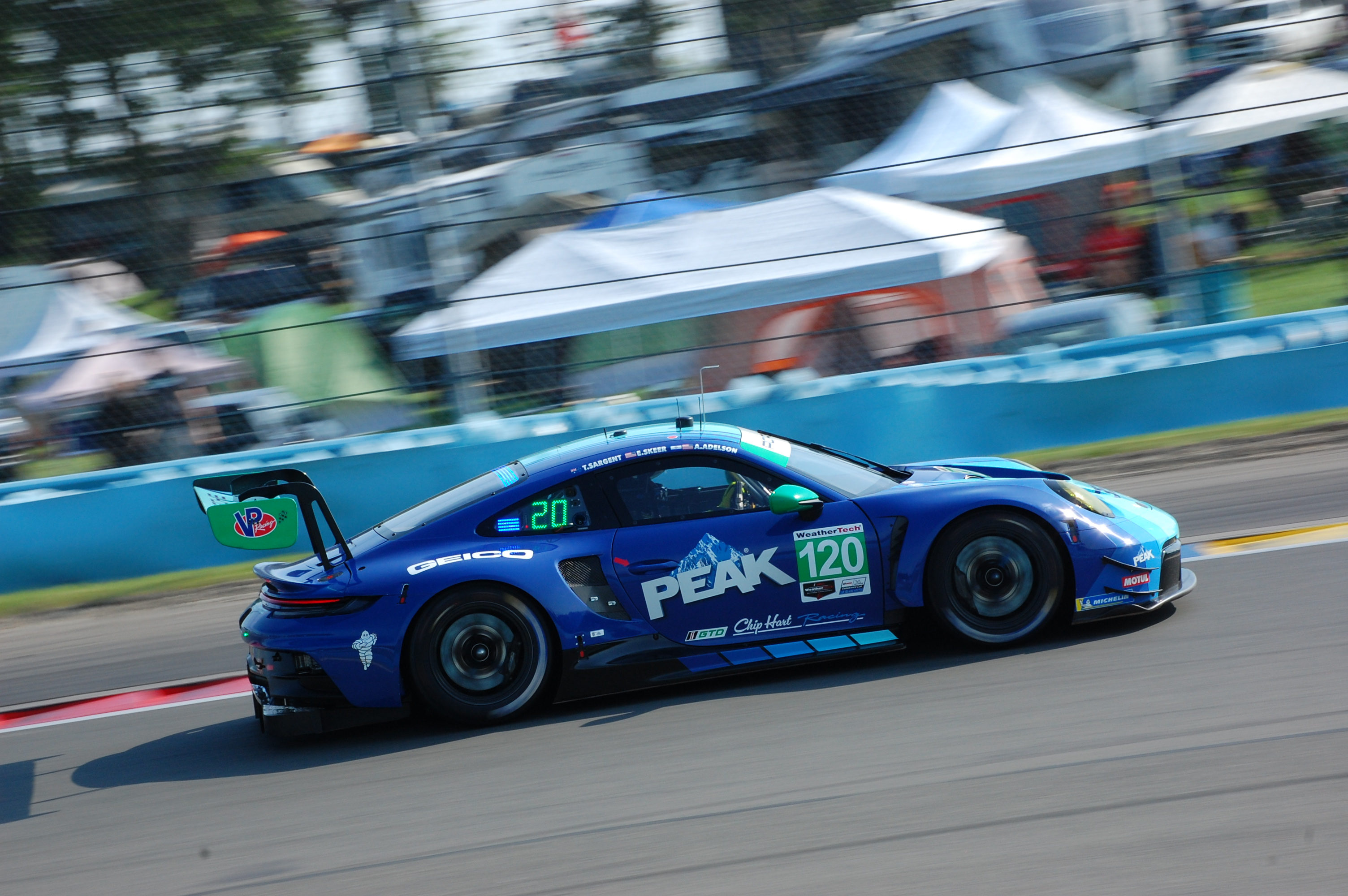
- Skeer in 2025
- Nationality: (United States) American
- Born: 17 September 1994 (age 32) Huntington, New York, U.S.
- Categorisation: FIA Silver (until 2024); FIA Gold (2025–)

Championship titles
- 2024 2015 2011: GT World Challenge America – Pro; Porsche GT3 Cup Challenge USA – Platinum; Teen Mazda Challenge West

Elliott Skeer (born 17 September 1994) is an American racing driver who last competed for Wright Motorsports in the IMSA SportsCar Championship.

Born in Huntington, New York, Skeer is the 2015 Porsche GT3 Cup Challenge and 2024 GT World Challenge America – Pro champion, and is also a class winner in the IMSA SportsCar Championship.

== Career ==
Skeer began karting at the age of six. Competing in karting until 2010, Skeer stepped up to the Teen Mazda Challenge in 2011, which he won after taking five wins in 11 races, earning him a seat in the SCCA Pro Mazda MX-5 Cup the following year.

Competing in MX-5 Cup for two years as a Mazda factory driver, Skeer finished fifth in points in his rookie year, before being runner-up to Christian Szymczak in 2013. The following year, Skeer made a one-off appearance for CJ Wilson Racing in the Continental Tire Sports Car Challenge at Laguna Seca, finishing third on debut alongside Tyler McQuarrie.

After joining the Porsche Young Driver Academy in late 2014, Skeer joined Wright Motorsports to compete in the Porsche GT3 Cup Challenge USA for 2015. In the 16-race season, Skeer won five times on his way to the title.

In 2016, Skeer joined Rebel Rock Racing to compete in the Continental Tire SportsCar Challenge in the Street Tuner class. Racing in the ST class for all but one round, Skeer finished 30th in the points with one podium to his name, a third-place finish at the season-opening round at Daytona.

Following a five-year hiatus from professional racing during which he worked primarily as a coach for other drivers and also joining iRacing as an alpha developer, Skeer joined Premier Racing in 2021 for a part-time schedule in GT4 America alongside Adam Adelson.

Continuing with Premier Racing and Adelson for 2022, the duo scored their maiden series win in a rain-shortened race one at NOLA, before repeating the same feat in race two. After inheriting their third class win at Road America and leading the Pro-Am standings during the season, the pair ended up finishing runner-up in points after retiring in the season finale at Indianapolis.

In 2023, Skeer continued his partnership with Adelson and joined Wright Motorsports to compete full-time GT World Challenge America. Competing in the Pro-Am class, the pair scored six class wins, including an overall win at Circuit of the Americas, on their way to runner-up honours in class. During 2023, Skeer also raced in the GS class of the Michelin Pilot Challenge for NOLASPORT, scoring a lone podium at the season-ending round at Road Atlanta en route to fifth in points.

Skeer remained with Wright Motorsports for his second season in GT World Challenge America, whilst also making his debut in the IMSA SportsCar Championship, racing alongside Adelson for the full-season and Jan Heylen for the endurance rounds. In the former, Skeer won both races at Sonoma and also finished second at the season-ending Indianapolis 8 Hours to clinch the Pro title. In the latter, Skeer scored his maiden podium at the 12 Hours of Sebring by finishing third, a feat he also repeated at Laguna Seca, before taking his first GTD win later that year at Indianapolis, helping him to finish 11th in points despite missing the round in Mosport.

In late 2024, it was announced that Skeer would return to Wright Motorsports for his sophomore season in the series, alongside Adelson. In the season-opening 24 Hours of Daytona, Skeer qualified on pole and finished second, before finishing on the podium again at Indianapolis to end the year sixth in GTD. During 2025, Skeer made his debut at the 24 Hours of Spa, racing in the Gold Cup alongside Adelson and Sargent, in which they finished fourth in class. Skeer also participated in the following round at the Nürburgring alongside the trio, in which they finished sixth in class.

The following year, Skeer remained with Wright Motorsports for his third season in the GTD class of the IMSA SportsCar Championship, albeit only racing at the 24 Hours of Daytona.

== Racing record ==
=== Racing career summary ===
Season	Series	Team	Races	Wins	Poles	F/Laps	Podiums	Points	Position
2011	Teen Mazda Challenge West		11	5	??	??	11	1435	**1st**
2012	SCCA Pro Racing Playboy Mazda MX-5 Cup	CJ Wilson Racing	11	1	1	??	6	505	5th
2013	SCCA Pro Racing Playboy Mazda MX-5 Cup		12	5	??	??	9	631	**2nd**
2014	Continental Tire Sports Car Challenge – ST	CJ Wilson Racing	1	0	1	1	1	0	NC
2015	Porsche GT3 Cup Challenge USA – Platinum	Wright Motorsports	16	5	10	3	13	261	**1st**
2016	Continental Tire SportsCar Challenge – GS	Rebel Rock Racing	1	0	0	0	0	0	24th
2016	Continental Tire SportsCar Challenge – ST	Rebel Rock Racing	6	0	0	0	1	99	30th
2021	GT4 America Series – Pro-Am	Premier Racing	6	0	1	0	0	17	17th
2022	GT4 America Series – Pro-Am	Premier Racing	14	3	2	1	8	177	**2nd**
2022–23	Middle East Trophy – GT3	Herberth Motorsport	1	0	0	0	0	0	NC
2023	GT World Challenge America – Pro-Am	Wright Motorsports	13	6	1	0	8	220	**2nd**
2023	Michelin Pilot Challenge – GS	NOLASPORT	10	0	0	0	1	2180	5th
2024	IMSA SportsCar Championship - GTD	Wright Motorsports	9	1	0	0	3	2192	11th
2024	GT World Challenge America – Pro	Wright Motorsports	13	3	3	2	10	257	**1st**
2024	Intercontinental GT Challenge	Wright Motorsports	1	0	0	1	1	18	14th
2025	IMSA SportsCar Championship - GTD	Wright Motorsports	10	0	1	0	2	2727	6th
2025	GT World Challenge Europe Endurance Cup	Wright Motorsports	2	0	0	0	0	0	NC
2025	GT World Challenge Europe Endurance Cup – Gold	Wright Motorsports	2	0	0	0	0	33	9th
2025	Intercontinental GT Challenge	Wright Motorsports	2	0	0	0	0	1	32nd
2026	IMSA SportsCar Championship – GTD	Wright Motorsports	1	0	0	0	0	131	79th

=== Complete IMSA SportsCar Championship results ===
(key) (Races in bold indicate pole position) (Races in italics indicate fastest lap)

Year	Entrant	Class	Make	Engine	1	2	3	4	5	6	7	8	9	10	Rank	Points	Ref
2024	Wright Motorsports	GTD	Porsche 911 GT3 R (992)	Porsche M97/80 4.2 L Flat-6	DAY; 7	SEB; 3	LBH; 16	LGA; 3	WGL; 19	MOS	ELK; 13	VIR; 8	IMS; 1	PET; 16	11th	2192	
2025	Wright Motorsports	GTD	Porsche 911 GT3 R (992)	Porsche M97/80 4.2 L Flat-6	**DAY**; 2	SEB; 5	LGA; 7	DET; 6	WGL; 13	MOS; 10	ELK; 6	VIR; 7	IMS; 2	PET; 6	6th	2727	
2026	Wright Motorsports	GTD	Porsche 911 GT3 R (992)	Porsche M97/80 4.2 L Flat-6	DAY; 20	SEB	LBH	LGA	WGL	MOS	ELK	VIR	IMS	PET	79th	131	
