= Trent Hindman =

American racing driver

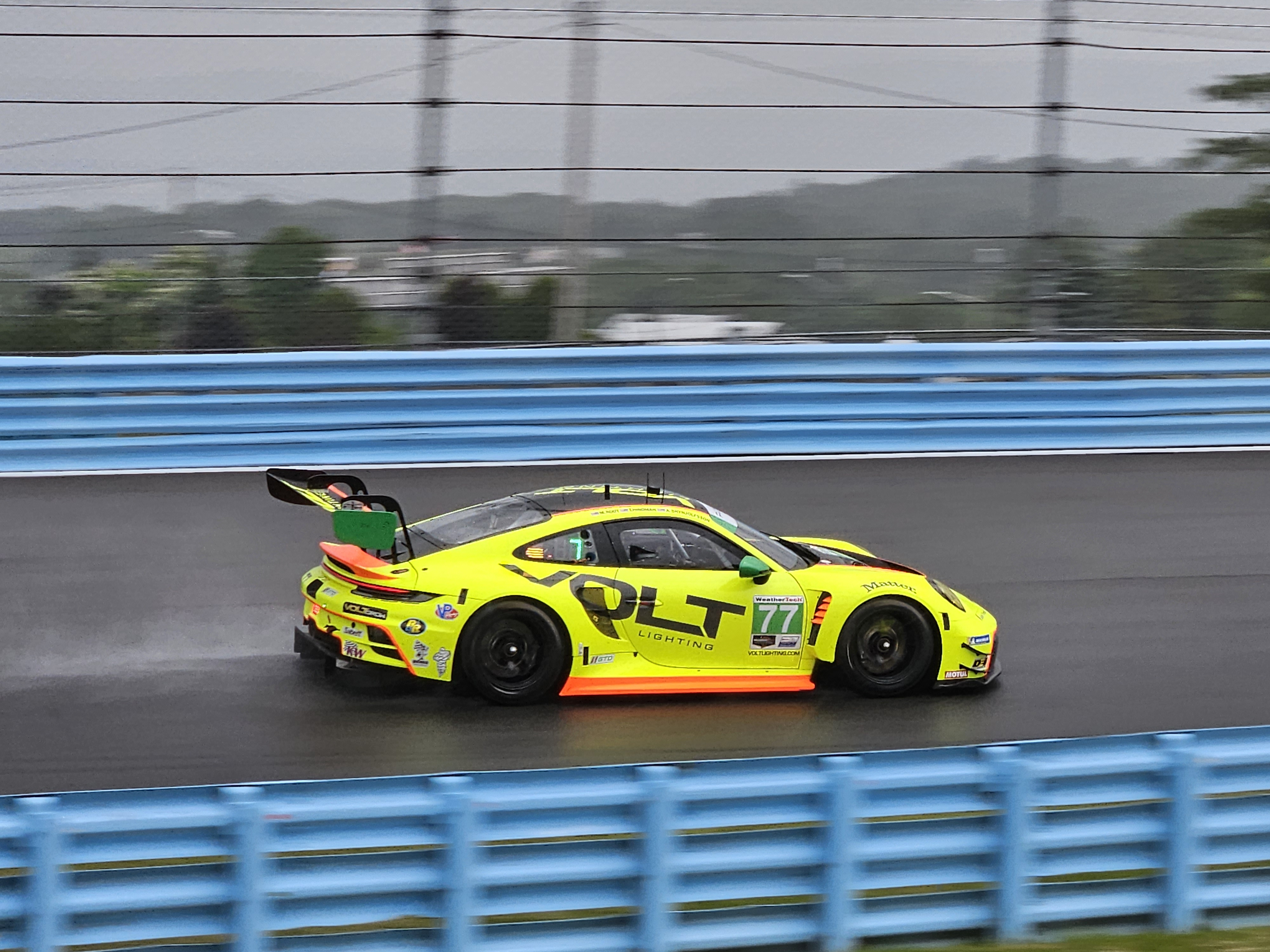
- Nationality: (United States) American
- Born: September 20, 1995 (age 31) West Long Branch, New Jersey, U.S.
- Categorisation: FIA Silver (until 2021); FIA Gold (2022–)

Previous series
- 2013-present 2011-2012 2012 2010-2011 2011 2003-2010: Continental Tire Sports Car Challenge; USF2000; Formula Renault 2.0 BARC; Skip Barber National Championship; Ontario Formula Ford Championship; Karting

Championship titles
- 2014 2013 2011: Continental Tire Sports Car Challenge GS; SCCA Majors Tour GT2; Ontario Formula Ford Championship

Awards
- 2011: Team USA Scholarship

Trent Hindman (born September 20, 1995, in West Long Branch, New Jersey) is an American racing driver. Hindman won the 2014 Continental Tire Sports Car Challenge in the GS class. He also was selected by BMW Motorsport for their junior program in 2015.

== Career ==
=== Karting ===
Hindman started karting at eight years old at his local kart track Old Bridge Township Raceway Park. In 2004, Hindman competed in the Junior Sportsman category at Old Bridge Township Raceway Park. He won the category in 2006 at the local track and also the New Jersey state championship. In the same year, Hindman also made his debut in the World Karting Association. He won his first national karting championship in 2008. He also won the Stars of Karting national championship in the Cadet class. In 2009, Hindman achieved podium classifications in various World Karting Association classes.

=== Formula racing ===
In 2009, Hindman completed the Skip Barber Racing School with driver coach Steve Welk. He subsequently ran his first race at Road America where he finished fifth. He finished fourth in the final point standings of the Skip Barber Southern Series. He continued competing in the Skip Barber National Championship throughout 2010 and 2011. In 2011, Hindman won two races at Lime Rock Park and one race at Autobahn Country Club marking his first wins in autosport. He ended up second in the point standings, behind Scott Anderson, but in front of Brandon Newey. He was then selected for the Mazdaspeed Motorsports Development Driver program, and was highly successful in the Ontario Formula Ford Championship. Running with Brian Graham Racing, Hindman won nine out of twelve races. He also competed at the Formula Ford Festival, finishing ninth.

For 2012, Hindman joined the Mazda Road to Indy competing in the USF2000. Running with Cape Motorsports with Wayne Taylor Racing Hindman scored two podium finishes and ended up fifth in the 2012 final standings.

=== Touring cars ===
After his USF2000 campaign, Hindman focussed on GT racing and touring cars. For 2013 Hindman competed full-time in the amateur based SCCA Majors Tour in the GT2 class. Racing with Fall-Line Motorsports in a Porsche 911 GT3 997 Hindman won eight races and clinched the SCCA Nationwide championship. During the season, Hindman won the prestigious SCCA June Sprints and achieved a second place at the SCCA National Championship Runoffs. He also competed in the Continental Tire Sports Car Challenge in the GS class in a BMW M3 achieving one podium at Mazda Raceway Laguna Seca. The following year, Hindman won the championship after winning races at Laguna Seca and Circuit of the Americas.

For 2015, Hindman again raced in the Continental Tire Sports Car Challenge. Hindman also made his debut in the 24 Hours of Zolder. At the Belgian racetrack, Hindman was part of the BMW Motorsport Junior team competing in a 2016 edition BMW M235i Cup Racer. Together with Louis Deletraz, Victor Bouveng and driver coach Dirk Adorf, the team supported by Walkenhorst Motorsport finished fifteenth overall, ninth in class.

== Personal ==
Hindman resides in the Wanamassa section of Ocean Township, Monmouth County, New Jersey, where he attended Ocean Township High School.

== Racing record ==
=== SCCA National Championship Runoffs ===
Year	Track	Car	Engine	Class	Finish	Start	Status
2013	Road America	Porsche 911 GT3 997	Porsche	GT2	2	2	Running

=== U.S. F2000 National Championship ===
(key)

Year	Team	1	2	3	4	5	6	7	8	9	10	11	12	13	14	Rank	Points
2012	Cape Motorsports Wayne Taylor Racing	SEB; 36	SEB; 30	STP; 5	STP; 4	LOR; 5	MOH; 4	MOH; 3	ROA; 4	ROA; 6	ROA; 8	BAL; 25	BAL; 12	VIR; 8	VIR; 3	5th	189

=== Complete IMSA SportsCar Championship results ===
Year	Entrant	Class	Chassis	Engine	1	2	3	4	5	6	7	8	9	10	11	12	Rank	Points	Ref
2017	BAR1 Motorsports	PC	Oreca FLM09	Chevrolet LS3 6.2 L V8	DAY; 2												15th	32	
2017	Riley Motorsports - Team AMG	GTD	Mercedes-AMG GT3	Mercedes-AMG M159 6.2 L V8		SEB	LBH	AUS	BEL	WGL	MOS	LIM	ELK	VIR; 3	LGA		43rd	54	
2017	Paul Miller Racing	GTD	Lamborghini Huracán GT3														43rd	54	
2017	Paul Miller Racing	GTD	Lamborghini Huracán GT3	Lamborghini 5.2 L V10												PET; 7	43rd	54	
2018	Meyer Shank Racing with Curb-Agajanian	GTD	Acura NSX GT3	Acura 3.5 L Turbo V6	DAY; 2	SEB; 8	MOH	BEL	WGL	MOS	LIM	ELK	VIR	LGA	PET; 2		25th	87	
2019	Meyer Shank Racing with Curb-Agajanian	GTD	Acura NSX GT3 Evo	Acura 3.5 L Turbo V6	DAY; 4	SEB; 7	MOH; 2	DET; 11	WGL; 1	MOS; 2	LIM; 2	ELK; 5	VIR; 2	LGA; 8	PET; 12		1st	283	
2020	Heinricher Racing with MSR Curb-Agajanian	GTD	Acura NSX GT3 Evo	Acura 3.5 L Turbo V6	DAY; 8	DAY	SEB	ELK	VIR	ATL; 7	MOH	CLT	PET; 6	LGA	SEB; 6		27th	93	
2021	Wright Motorsports	GTD	Porsche 911 GT3 R	Porsche 4.0 L Flat-6	DAY; 4	SEB; 2	MOH	DET	WGL; 8	WGL	LIM; 8	ELK; 3	LGA; 3	LBH; 3	VIR; 4	PET; 5	6th	2718	
2023	VOLT Racing with Wright Motorsports	GTD	Porsche 911 GT3 R (992)	Porsche 4.2 L Flat-6	DAY; 11	SEB; 8	LBH; 10	MON; 6	WGL; 11	MOS; 7	LIM; 3	ELK; 14	VIR; 9	IMS; 6	PET; 3		8th	2757	
2024	Kellymoss with Riley	GTD	Porsche 911 GT3 R (992)	Porsche 4.2 L Flat-6	DAY; 11	SEB	LBH	LGA	WGL	MOS	ELK	VIR	IMS	PET			63rd	208	
2025	Wayne Taylor Racing	GTD	Lamborghini Huracán GT3 Evo 2	Lamborghini 5.2 L V10	DAY; 10	SEB; 14	LBH; 11	LGA; 18	WGL; 20	MOS; 1	ELK; 5	VIR; 13	IMS; 14	PET; 12			12th	2274	
2026	Wayne Taylor Racing	GTD	Lamborghini Huracán GT3 Evo 2	Lamborghini 5.2 L V10	DAY; 8	SEB; 16	LBH; 17	LGA; 1	WGL; 20	MOS; 5	ELK; 12	VIR; 5	IMS; 13	PET; 16			11th	2215	

=== 24 Hours of Zolder ===
Year	Team	Co-Drivers	Car	Class	Laps	Pos.	Class Pos.
2015	(Germany) Walkenhorst Motorsport	(Switzerland) Louis Delétraz (Sweden) Victor Bouveng (Germany) Dirk Adorf	BMW M235i Racing Cup	T7	710	15th	7th

Sporting positions
Preceded by Nick Longhi; Matt Plumb	Continental Tire Sports Car Challenge; GS; 2014	Succeeded by Incumbent
Preceded by Tom Patton	SCCA Majors Tour Nationwide Champion; GT2; 2013	Succeeded by Randall Kinsland
Preceded by Dean Baker	Ontario Formula Ford Championship; 2011	Succeeded by Michael Adams
