= 2015 Continental Tire Sports Car Challenge =

Motor racing competition

Seasons
- ← 2014 2016 →

The 2015 Continental Tire Sports Car Challenge season was the series' sixteenth running and the second under the International Motor Sports Association's sanction. The Grand Sport portion was won by Andrew Davis and Robin Liddell who drove the #6 car for Stevenson Motorsports.

== Schedule ==
1. Daytona International Speedway- January 23 to support the 24 Hours of Daytona
2. Sebring International Raceway- March 20 to support the Twelve Hours of Sebring
3. Mazda Raceway Laguna Seca- May 2
4. Watkins Glen International- June 27 to support the Six Hours of Watkins Glen
5. Canadian Tire Motorsport Park- July 11
6. Lime Rock Park- July 24/25
7. Road America- August 8
8. Virginia International Raceway- August 22
9. Circuit of the Americas- September 18
10. Road Atlanta- October 2 to support the Petit Le Mans

Unlike the United SportsCar Championship, which the series supports, no street circuits were used.
