= Liam Dwyer =

- Born: 1981 or 1982 (age 44–45); Litchfield, Connecticut
- Military career
- Allegiance: United States of America
- Branch: Marine Corps
- Service years: 2000–2015
- Rank: Staff Sgt.
- Unit: 1st Battalion, 5th Marines
- Conflicts: War on terror; Iraq War; War in Afghanistan
- Awards: Purple Heart (2)

Previous series
- 2018 2014–2017: ChampCar Endurance Series; Continental Tire SportsCar Challenge

Liam Dwyer is an American former sports car racing driver and United States Marine. He served in the Marine Corps from 2000 to 2015, during which he was deployed to wars in Iraq and Afghanistan.

In 2011, Dwyer lost his left leg after stepping on an improvised explosive device (IED). He uses a prosthesis when racing, and has competed in the Continental Tire SportsCar Challenge and ChampCar Endurance Series.

== Military career ==
After the USS Cole bombing, Dwyer enlisted in the military in October 2000 and trained at Marine Corps Recruit Depot Parris Island. He was deployed to Iraq in January 2001 and served as a Humvee turret gunner. He returned from Iraq in 2007 after suffering injuries to his left side from an IED shrapnel. Dwyer later encountered a major he had previously worked with, who encouraged him to re-enlist and serve in Afghanistan. He began his second tour in 2010 as a civil affairs specialist for the 1st Battalion, 5th Marines.

On May 22, 2011, Dwyer was clearing a compound in Sangin when he stepped on an IED. The blast destroyed his left leg above his knee, damaged his right leg and arm to the point where he lost most feeling on that side, and resulted in other injuries to his abdomen and torso. Four other Marines were also injured in the blast.

To prevent infection, Dwyer underwent surgery every fortnight for five weeks followed by reconstructive surgery. A titanium rod was inserted into his left femur, a process called osseointegration, to allow for a prosthetic leg to be inserted. He spent four years rehabilitating at the Walter Reed National Military Medical Center, undergoing over 50 procedures. Other surgeries included installing a post to stabilize his prosthesis, reducing chronic pain, and improving his mobility.

== Racing career ==
Dwyer entered track days at after returning from Iraq in 2007 before attending the Skip Barber Racing School. Despite his amputated leg, Dwyer found the injuries were "not bad enough to where I can't race anymore." He began using a special prosthesis that attached to the clutch pedal via hook-and-loop fastener when driving; when switching with a co-driver, he would remove the split pin joining the prosthesis and the clutch.

After competing in vintage car racing throughout 2012, he joined the National Auto Sport Association the following year. He also participated in autocross and rallying. During the 2012 24 Hours of Daytona, he befriended Freedom Autosport owners Tom Long and Derek Whitis, who expressed interest in fielding a car for him in the Continental Tire SportsCar Challenge; the team name is a reference to the ownership's support for the military, including donating to the Wounded Support Fund. A successful test session at Sebring International Raceway in 2013 prompted Mazda to sign him as well.

Dwyer entered the 2014 Continental Tire Sports Car Challenge's ST class on a part-time schedule in the No. 27 Mazda MX-5, which he shared with Long. His professional racing debut took place at Mazda Raceway Laguna Seca, where he retired after crashing with Lee Carpentier. In May, he and Long won at Lime Rock Park. Dwyer scored a second victory in 2015 at Laguna Seca after teammate Aaron Carbonell passed Long on the final lap; Sgt. Aaron Denning, who rescued Dwyer after the 2011 Afghanistan explosion, was Dwyer's guest of honor at the race weekend and waved the green flag.

Additional surgeries and physical therapy prevented Dwyer from racing in late 2017 and for much of 2018. He made his return as part of the 2018 ChampCar Endurance Series.

== Personal life ==
Dwyer met his wife Meghan during his recovery at Walter Reed.
