= 2013 Continental Tire Sports Car Challenge =

Motor racing competition

Seasons
- ← 2012 2014 →

The 2013 Continental Tire Sports Car Challenge was the thirteenth season of the Grand American Road Racing Association's support series and the final under the Grand Am sanctioning body. For 2014 the series will change to being sanctioned by the International Motor Sports Association upon Grand Am's merger with IMSA's American Le Mans Series to form the United SportsCar Championship. The series, to be known as the IMSA Continental Tire Sports Car Challenge, will remain entirely unaffected aside from the new sanctioning body.

== Schedule ==
The schedule was announced on September 29, 2012.

| Round | Date | Event Name | Circuit | GS Winning Car | ST Winning Car |
| Round | Date | Event Name | Circuit | GS Winning Drivers | ST Winning Drivers |
|---|---|---|---|---|---|
| 1 | January 25 | BMW Performance 200 | Daytona International Speedway (Road Course) | Ford Mustang Boss 302R | Nissan Altima Coupe |
| 1 | January 25 | BMW Performance 200 | Daytona International Speedway (Road Course) | (United States) Billy Johnson (United States) Jack Roush, Jr. | (Bulgaria) Vesko Kozarov (United States) Lara Tallman |
| 2 | March 2 | GRAND-AM of the Americas | Circuit of the Americas | BMW M3 | Mazda MX-5 |
| 2 | March 2 | GRAND-AM of the Americas | Circuit of the Americas | (United States) Bill Auberlen (Canada) Paul Dalla Lana | (United Kingdom) Stevan McAleer (United States) Marc Miller |
| 3 | April 6 | Barber 200 | Barber Motorsports Park | Porsche 911 Carrera S | Mazda MX-5 |
| 3 | April 6 | Barber 200 | Barber Motorsports Park | (United States) Nick Longhi (United States) Matt Plumb | (United States) Derek Whitis (United States) Tom Long |
| 4 | April 20 | PwC 250 | Road Atlanta | Chevrolet Camaro GS.R | BMW 128i |
| 4 | April 20 | PwC 250 | Road Atlanta | (United States) John Edwards (United States) Matt Bell | (United States) Terry Borcheller (United States) Mike LaMarra |
| 5 | June 15 | Diamond Cellar Classic | Mid-Ohio Sports Car Course | Porsche 911 Carrera S | Honda Civic Si |
| 5 | June 15 | Diamond Cellar Classic | Mid-Ohio Sports Car Course | (United States) Nick Longhi (United States) Matt Plumb | (United States) Tom Dyer (United States) Andrew Novich |
| 6 | June 29 | Continental Tire 150 at The Glen | Watkins Glen International | BMW M3 | Mazda MX-5 |
| 6 | June 29 | Continental Tire 150 at The Glen | Watkins Glen International | (United States) Mark Boden (United States) Bryan Sellers | (United Kingdom) Stevan McAleer (United States) Marc Miller |
| 7 | July 26 | Brickyard Sports Car Challenge | Indianapolis Motor Speedway (Road Course) | BMW M3 | BMW 128i |
| 7 | July 26 | Brickyard Sports Car Challenge | Indianapolis Motor Speedway (Road Course) | (United States) Mark Boden (United States) Bryan Sellers | (United States) Terry Borcheller (United States) Mike LaMarra |
| 8 | August 10 | Road America 200 | Road America | Porsche 911 Carrera S | BMW 328i |
| 8 | August 10 | Road America 200 | Road America | (United States) Nick Longhi (United States) Matt Plumb | (United States) Gregory Liefooghe (United States) Tyler Cooke |
| 9 | August 17 | SFP Grand Prix | Kansas Speedway (Road Course) | Chevrolet Camaro GS.R | Mazdaspeed 3 |
| 9 | August 17 | SFP Grand Prix | Kansas Speedway (Road Course) | (United States) John Edwards (United States) Matt Bell | (Canada) Taylor Hacquard (United States) Derek Jones |
| 10 | September 8 | Continental Tire Sports Car Festival | Mazda Raceway Laguna Seca | Porsche 911 Carrera S | Mazda MX-5 |
| 10 | September 8 | Continental Tire Sports Car Festival | Mazda Raceway Laguna Seca | (United States) Spencer Pumpelly (United States) Jim Norman | (United States) Andrew Carbonell (United States) Rhett O'Doski |
| 11 | September 27–28 | Championship Weekend | Lime Rock Park (Note: Separate races for GS and ST will be run at Lime Rock.) | Ford Mustang Boss 302R | Mazda MX-5 |
| 11 | September 27–28 | Championship Weekend | Lime Rock Park | (United States) Billy Johnson (United States) Jack Roush, Jr. | (United States) Joel Miller (United States) Tristan Nunez |
