= 2014 Continental Tire Sports Car Challenge =

Sports car racing season

Seasons
- ← 2013 2015 →

The 2014 IMSA Continental Tire Sports Car Challenge was the fifteenth season of the showroom stock series and the first under the International Motor Sports Association sanctioning body after the Grand American Road Racing Association's Rolex Sports Car Series was merged with IMSA's American Le Mans Series. The series remained unaffected aside from the addition of IMSA to the beginning of its name.

In the Grand Sport class, Fall-Line Motorsports pairing Trent Hindman and John Edwards won two races during the season, but due to Edwards not completing a mandatory period behind the wheel at Kansas Speedway, Hindman was crowned sole champion by 15 points ahead of Edwards. Stevenson Motorsports drivers Andrew Davis and Robin Liddell were next in the championship, finishing just one point behind Edwards, despite winning one more race than the Fall-Line team. TRG-AMR North America's Kris Wilson was the only other driver to win multiple races; he won at Kansas with James Davison, while he also won at Virginia International Raceway, sharing with Max Riddle. Other teams to win races were the second Fall-Line team of Shelby Blackstock and Ashley Freiberg, Rum Bum Racing pairing Nick Longhi and Matt Plumb, Matt Bell and Andy Lally for Stevenson Motorsports, CKS Autosport's Lawson Aschenbach and Eric Curran, while the season finale was won by Multimatic Motorsports with drivers Ian James and Billy Johnson.

In Street Tuner, there was a solo champion like in the Grand Sport class. Murillo Racing's Eric Foss and Jeff Mosing competed for the majority of the season together – with two wins at Daytona and Virginia International Raceway – but Mosing missed the Laguna Seca event due to back spasms. Thus, Foss won the championship by eight points ahead of Team Sahlen driver Wayne Nonnamaker, who did not win a race but finished in second place on four occasions. Mosing finished in third place in the championship, a further three points in arrears. The most wins were taken by Compass360 Racing pairing Ryan Eversley and Kyle Gimple, who won three races during the season – including the last two races – but their other performances were only good enough for ninth in the drivers' championship. Randy Pobst and Andrew Carbonell took back-to-back victories for Freedom Autosport at Sebring and Laguna Seca, while other race victories were taken by Chad Gilsinger and Michael Valiante at Kansas, Canadian duo Remo Ruscitti and Adam Isman on home soil at Canadian Tire Motorsport Park, Cody Ellsworth and Corey Lewis at Indianapolis Motor Speedway and Terry Borcheller and Mike LaMarra at Road America. A second Freedom Autosport car was able to win at Lime Rock, when Tom Long shared a car with Liam Dwyer – a staff sergeant with the United States Marines – who was racing with a prosthesis on his left leg after losing it when he stepped on a land mine in Afghanistan, three years prior.

== Schedule ==
=== Official test sessions ===
Two official test sessions were scheduled:

- January 3–5 – Daytona International Speedway
- February 20–21 – Sebring International Raceway

=== Race schedule ===
A twelve-round schedule was announced on October 11, 2013.

Round	Circuit	Location	Date
1	Daytona International Speedway	Daytona, Florida	January 24
2	Sebring International Raceway	Sebring, Florida	March 14
3	Mazda Raceway Laguna Seca	Monterey, California	May 3
4	Lime Rock Park	Lakeville, Connecticut	May 24
5	Kansas Speedway	Kansas City, Kansas	June 7
6	Watkins Glen International	Watkins Glen, New York	June 28
7	Canadian Tire Motorsport Park	Bowmanville, Ontario	July 12
8	Indianapolis Motor Speedway	Speedway, Indiana	July 25
9	Road America	Elkhart Lake, Wisconsin	August 9
10	Virginia International Raceway	Alton, Virginia	August 23
11	Circuit of the Americas	Austin, Texas	September 20
12	Road Atlanta	Braselton, Georgia	October 3

== Results ==
Round	Date	Event Name	Circuit	GS Winning Car	ST Winning Car
Round	Date	Event Name	Circuit	GS Winning Drivers	ST Winning Drivers
1	January 24	BMW Performance 200	Daytona International Speedway (Road Course)	BMW M3	BMW 328i
1	January 24	BMW Performance 200	Daytona International Speedway (Road Course)	(United States) Shelby Blackstock (United States) Ashley Freiberg	(United States) Eric Foss (United States) Jeff Mosing
2	March 15	Sebring	Sebring International Raceway	Chevrolet Camaro Z/28.R	Mazda MX-5
2	March 15	Sebring	Sebring International Raceway	(United Kingdom) Robin Liddell (United States) Andrew Davis	(United States) Randy Pobst (United States) Andrew Carbonell
3	May 3	Continental Tire Sports Car Challenge; Powered by Mazda	Mazda Raceway Laguna Seca	BMW M3	Mazda MX-5
3	May 3	Continental Tire Sports Car Challenge; Powered by Mazda	Mazda Raceway Laguna Seca	(United States) John Edwards (United States) Trent Hindman	(United States) Randy Pobst (United States) Andrew Carbonell
4	May 24	Northeast Grand Prix	Lime Rock Park (Note: Separate races for GS and ST were run at Lime Rock.)	Porsche 911 Carrera S	Mazda MX-5
4	May 24	Northeast Grand Prix	Lime Rock Park	(United States) Nick Longhi (United States) Matt Plumb	(United States) Tom Long (United States) Liam Dwyer
5	June 7	The Grand Prix of Kansas	Kansas Speedway (Road Course)	Aston Martin Vantage	Honda Civic Si
5	June 7	The Grand Prix of Kansas	Kansas Speedway (Road Course)	(Australia) James Davison (United States) Kris Wilson	(United States) Chad Gilsinger (Canada) Michael Valiante
6	June 28	Continental Tire 150	Watkins Glen International	Chevrolet Camaro Z/28.R	Honda Civic Si
6	June 28	Continental Tire 150	Watkins Glen International	(United Kingdom) Robin Liddell (United States) Andrew Davis	(United States) Ryan Eversley (United States) Kyle Gimple
7	July 12	Mobil 1 Sportscar Grand Prix; Presented by Hawk Performance	Canadian Tire Motorsport Park	Chevrolet Camaro Z/28.R	Porsche Cayman
7	July 12	Mobil 1 Sportscar Grand Prix; Presented by Hawk Performance	Canadian Tire Motorsport Park	(United States) Andy Lally (United States) Matt Bell	(Canada) Remo Ruscitti (Canada) Adam Isman
8	July 25	Brickyard Sports Car Challenge	Indianapolis Motor Speedway (Road Course)	Chevrolet Camaro Z/28.R	Porsche Cayman
8	July 25	Brickyard Sports Car Challenge	Indianapolis Motor Speedway (Road Course)	(United Kingdom) Robin Liddell (United States) Andrew Davis	(United States) Cody Ellsworth (United States) Corey Lewis
9	August 9	Continental Tire Road Race Showcase	Road America	Chevrolet Camaro Z/28.R	BMW 128i
9	August 9	Continental Tire Road Race Showcase	Road America	(United States) Lawson Aschenbach (United States) Eric Curran	(United States) Terry Borcheller (United States) Mike LaMarra
10	August 23	Oak Tree Grand Prix at VIR	Virginia International Raceway	Aston Martin Vantage	Porsche Cayman
10	August 23	Oak Tree Grand Prix at VIR	Virginia International Raceway	(Canada) Max Riddle (United States) Kris Wilson	(United States) Eric Foss (United States) Jeff Mosing
11	September 19	Lone Star Le Mans	Circuit of the Americas	BMW M3	Honda Civic Si
11	September 19	Lone Star Le Mans	Circuit of the Americas	(United States) John Edwards (United States) Trent Hindman	(United States) Ryan Eversley (United States) Kyle Gimple
12	October 3	Petit Le Mans	Road Atlanta	Mustang Boss 302R	Honda Civic Si
12	October 3	Petit Le Mans	Road Atlanta	(United Kingdom) Ian James (United States) Billy Johnson	(United States) Ryan Eversley (United States) Kyle Gimple

== News ==
- Compass 360 Racing announced that they were entering Subaru WRXs in Grand Sport alongside their street tuner Honda Civic Si's.
