= 2011 Formula Lista Junior season =

2011 Formula Lista Junior

Seasons
- ← 2010 2012 →

The 2011 Formula Lista Junior season (an open wheel racing motor sport series based in mainland Europe), was the twelfth Formula Lista Junior season. It began on 16 April at the Hockenheimring and ended on 25 September at Autodromo Nazionale Monza after twelve races. Philip Ellis won the drivers' championship and Daltec Racing won the teams' championship.

== Teams and drivers ==
- All cars are powered by BMW engines, and Mygale FB02 chassis.

Team	No.	Driver	Rounds
(Switzerland) Felix Racing Team	21	(Switzerland) Marcel Felix	All
(Switzerland) Felix Racing Team	22	(Switzerland) Jan Schwitter	All
(Germany) GU-Racing International	23	(United Kingdom) Philip Ellis	3–6
(Germany) GU-Racing International	35	(United Kingdom) Philip Ellis	1
(Switzerland) Jo Zeller Racing	24	(Switzerland) Levin Amweg	All
(Switzerland) Jo Zeller Racing	44	(Switzerland) Kevin Jörg	6
(Switzerland) Daltec Racing	25	(Switzerland) Jonas Rodrigues	1–5
(Switzerland) Daltec Racing	26	(Switzerland) David Freiburghaus	All
(Switzerland) Daltec Racing	27	(Austria) Corinna Kamper	All
(Switzerland) Daltec Racing	28	(Germany) Benjamin Kutzera	1–3, 6
(Switzerland) Daltec Racing	29	(Switzerland) Kris Richard	1, 3–6
(Switzerland) Daltec Racing	30	(Germany) Dennis Wüsthoff	All
(Germany) CSR Motorsport	33	(Germany) Eric Neuber	1

== Race calendar and results ==
Round		Circuit	Date	Pole position	Fastest lap	Winning driver	Winning team
1	R1	(Germany) Hockenheimring	16 April	(Switzerland) Jonas Rodrigues	(Germany) Dennis Wüsthoff	(Germany) Eric Neuber	(Germany) CSR Motorsport
1	R2	(Germany) Hockenheimring	17 April	(Switzerland) Jonas Rodrigues	(Switzerland) Levin Amweg	(Switzerland) Levin Amweg	(Switzerland) Jo Zeller Racing
2	R1	(Austria) Red Bull Ring	21 May	(Switzerland) David Freiburghaus	(Switzerland) Jonas Rodrigues	(Germany) Dennis Wüsthoff	(Switzerland) Daltec Racing
2	R2	(Austria) Red Bull Ring	22 May	(Germany) Dennis Wüsthoff	(Germany) Dennis Wüsthoff	(Germany) Dennis Wüsthoff	(Switzerland) Daltec Racing
3	R1	(Germany) Hockenheimring	9 July	(United Kingdom) Philip Ellis	(United Kingdom) Philip Ellis	(Germany) Dennis Wüsthoff	(Switzerland) Daltec Racing
3	R2	(Germany) Hockenheimring	10 July	(Switzerland) David Freiburghaus	(Switzerland) David Freiburghaus	(Switzerland) David Freiburghaus	(Switzerland) Daltec Racing
4	R1	(Czech Republic) Autodrom Most	6 August	(United Kingdom) Philip Ellis	(United Kingdom) Philip Ellis	(United Kingdom) Philip Ellis	(Germany) GU-Racing International
4	R2	(Czech Republic) Autodrom Most	7 August	(United Kingdom) Philip Ellis	(Switzerland) Jan Schwitter	(United Kingdom) Philip Ellis	(Germany) GU-Racing International
5	R1	(France) Dijon-Prenois	10 September	(United Kingdom) Philip Ellis	(United Kingdom) Philip Ellis	(United Kingdom) Philip Ellis	(Germany) GU-Racing International
5	R2	(France) Dijon-Prenois	11 September	(United Kingdom) Philip Ellis	(Germany) Dennis Wüsthoff	(United Kingdom) Philip Ellis	(Germany) GU-Racing International
6	R1	(Italy) Autodromo Nazionale Monza	24 September	(Austria) Corinna Kamper	(United Kingdom) Philip Ellis	(Austria) Corinna Kamper	(Switzerland) Daltec Racing
6	R2	(Italy) Autodromo Nazionale Monza	25 September	(United Kingdom) Philip Ellis	(United Kingdom) Philip Ellis	(United Kingdom) Philip Ellis	(Germany) GU-Racing International

== Championship standings ==
=== Drivers' championship ===
Position	1st	2nd	3rd	4th	5th	6th	7th	8th	9th	10th	Pole position	Fastest lap
Points	20	15	12	10	8	6	4	3	2	1	**2**	2

Pos	Driver	HOC (Germany)		RBR (Austria)		HOC (Germany)		MOS (Czech Republic)		DIJ (France)		MZA (Italy)		Pts
1	(United Kingdom) Philip Ellis	8	5			**2**	2	**1**	**1**	**1**	**1**	2	**1**	178
2	(Germany) Dennis Wüsthoff	3	3	1	**1**	1	4	2	7	2	2	4	3	173
3	(Switzerland) David Freiburghaus	4	4	**7**	5	3	**1**	5	4	4	4	9	4	120
4	(Switzerland) Levin Amweg	2	1	4	3	6	3	9	5	6	6	7	Ret	103
5	(Switzerland) Jan Schwitter	9	8	6	4	7	6	6	2	7	3	3	8	85
6	(Austria) Corinna Kamper	5	9	5	7	8	7	7	6	3	Ret	**1**	5	81
7	(Switzerland) Kris Richard	7	6			10	5	4	3	5	5	6	2	78
8	(Switzerland) Jonas Rodrigues	**10**	**2**	3	2	5	Ret	3	Ret	Ret	Ret			69
9	(Germany) Benjamin Kutzera	6	7	2	6	4	9					5	6	57
10	(Switzerland) Marcel Felix	11	10	8	8	9	8	8	8	8	7	Ret	7	29
11	(Germany) Eric Neuber	1	Ret											20
12	(Switzerland) Kevin Jörg											8	9	5
Pos	Driver	HOC (Germany)		RBR (Austria)		HOC (Germany)		MOS (Czech Republic)		DIJ (France)		MZA (Italy)		Pts

Colour	Result
Gold	Winner
Silver	Second place
Bronze	Third place
Green	Points classification
Blue	Non-points classification
Blue	Non-classified finish (NC)
Purple	Retired, not classified (Ret)
Red	Did not qualify (DNQ)
Red	Did not pre-qualify (DNPQ)
Black	Disqualified (DSQ)
White	Did not start (DNS)
White	Withdrew (WD)
White	Race cancelled (C)
Blank	Did not practice (DNP)
Blank	Did not arrive (DNA)
Blank	Excluded (EX)

**Bold** – Pole
Italics – Fastest Lap

=== Teams' championship ===
Position	1st	2nd	3rd	4th	5th	6th	7th	8th
Points	10	8	6	5	4	3	2	1

Pos	Team	HOC (Germany)		RBR (Austria)		HOC (Germany)		MOS (Czech Republic)		DIJ (France)		MZA (Italy)		Pts
1	(Switzerland) Daltec Racing	3	2	1	1	1	1	2	3	2	2	1	2	102
2	(Germany) GU-Racing International	8	5			2	2	1	1	1	1	2	1	85
3	(Switzerland) Jo Zeller Racing	2	1	4	3	6	3	9	5	6	6	7	9	77
4	(Switzerland) Felix Racing Team	9	8	6	4	7	6	6	2	7	3	3	7	68
5	(Switzerland) CSR Motorsport	1	Ret											10
Pos	Team	HOC (Germany)		RBR (Austria)		HOC (Germany)		MOS (Czech Republic)		DIJ (France)		MZA (Italy)		Pts
