= Formula LO =

Former Single-Seater Racing Championship

- Category: Single seaters
- Country: Europe
- Inaugural season: 2000
- Folded: 2012
- Drivers: 12 (2011)
- Teams: 5 (2011)
- Constructors: LO BMW FB02, Mygale
- Engine suppliers: BMW
- Tyre suppliers: Michelin
- Last Drivers' champion: (Switzerland) Levin Amweg
- Last Teams' champion: (Germany) GU-Racing
- Official website: listajunior.smk-net.de/

Formula LO, previously known formally as LO Formel Lista Junior, was an open wheel racing series based in mainland Europe, which often ran as a support series to the Formula Renault 2.0 Switzerland. The first season was in 2000 and is based in Switzerland, and governed by the country's National Motorsport Authority. Because motorsports are essentially banned in Switzerland, the racing takes place on circuits in surrounding nations such as France, Italy and Germany. Many of the drivers go on to race in Formula Three and especially to the closely linked Formula BMW series. The series is often considered to be in competition with the German-based ADAC Formel Masters, which formed in 2008. It is named after its primary sponsor, Lista Office, owned by Swiss racing driver Fredy Lienhard.

== Scoring system ==
- Points in the drivers' championship are awarded to the top ten race finishers with two bonus points for pole position and the fastest race lap. In the teams' championship, a team can only score points if one of its drivers finish in the top ten.

Drivers' championship

Position	1st	2nd	3rd	4th	5th	6th	7th	8th	9th	10th	Pole position	Fastest lap
Points	20	15	12	10	8	6	4	3	2	1	2	2

Teams' championship

Position	1st	2nd	3rd	4th	5th	6th	7th	8th
Points	10	8	6	5	4	3	2	1

== Champions ==
Season	Champion	Team Champion	Chassis
2000	(Switzerland) Neel Jani	no data	Arcobaleno
2001	(Switzerland) Ken Allemann	no data	Arcobaleno
2002	(Poland) Damian Sawicki	no data	Arcobaleno
2003	(Switzerland) Romain Grosjean	no data	Formula Monza
2004	(Latvia) Harald Schlegelmilch	no data	Formula Junior
2005	(Switzerland) Rolf Biland	no data	Arcobaleno
2006	(Austria) Gerhard Tweraser	(Austria) Neuhauser Racing	Formula Junior
2007	(Austria) Klaus Bachler	(Austria) Neuhauser Racing	Formula Junior
2008	(Switzerland) Joël Volluz	(Switzerland) Daltec Racing	Mygale FB02
2009	(Italy) Kevin Giovesi	(Switzerland) Daltec Racing	Mygale FB02
2010	(United States) Michael Lamotte	(Switzerland) Daltec Racing	Mygale FB02
2011	(United Kingdom) Philip Ellis	(Switzerland) Daltec Racing	Mygale FB02
2012	(Switzerland) Levin Amweg	(Germany) GU-Racing	Mygale FB02

== See also ==
- Formula BMW
- Formula Junior
- ADAC Formel Masters
