= Philip Ellis (racing driver) =

Swiss-British-German racing driver

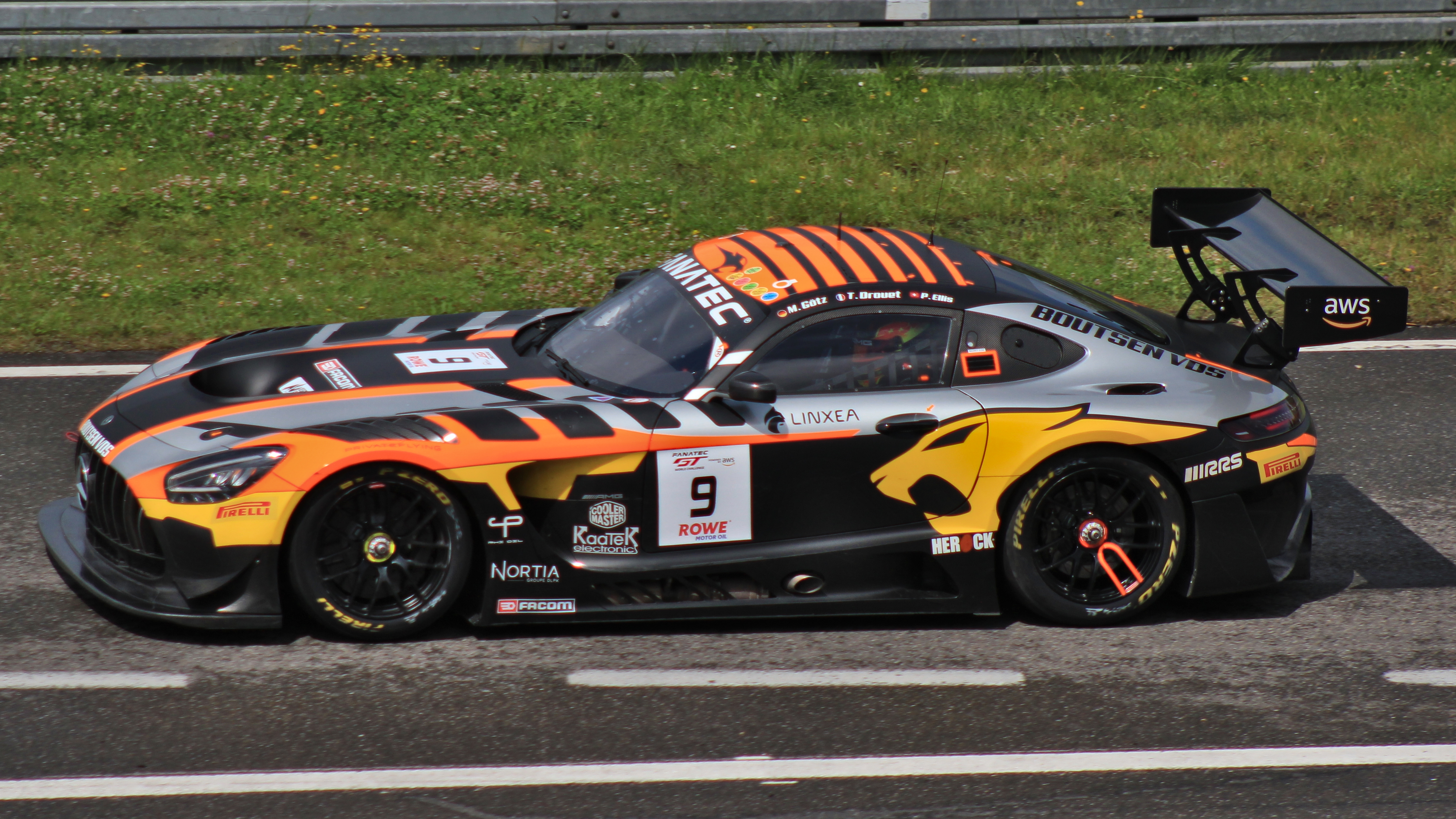
- Nationality: (Switzerland) Swiss (United Kingdom) British (Germany) German via triple nationality
- Born: 9 October 1992 (age 34) Munich, Bavaria, Germany
- Categorisation: FIA Silver (until 2021); FIA Gold (2022–)

Championship titles
- 2024-2025 2024 2017 2011: IMSA SportsCar Championship - GTD; Michelin Endurance Cup - GTD; Audi Sport TT Cup; Formula Lista Junior

Philip Ellis (born 9 October 1992) is a Swiss-British-German racing driver. He is currently competing for HTP Motorsport in the IMSA SportsCar Championship, having previously competed in the DTM for the same team.

== Career ==
In 2011, Ellis won the Formula Lista Junior, a championship grouping together Formula BMWs, with the GU-Racing team. In 2012, he took part in the 2012 Formula 3 Euro Series as well as the 2012 FIA Formula 3 European Championship, still with GU Racing, he was aiming for the place of best beginner. In 2017, he won the Audi Sport TT Cup. The series was cancelled in 2018, thus making Ellis the final TT Cup champion.

Ellis competed in the 2021 Deutsche Tourenwagen Masters alongside Lucas Auer. He drove for HTP Winward Motorsport. He returned to the GT World Challenge Europe Endurance Cup for a full season campaign in 2023, joining Indy Dontje and Russell Ward in the Gold Cup class.

== Racing record ==
=== Career summary ===
Season	Series	Team	Races	Wins	Poles	F/Laps	Podiums	Points	Position
2011	Formula Lista Junior	GU-Racing	10	5	6	5	8	178	**1st**
2012	FIA Formula 3 European Championship	GU-Racing	6	0	0	0	0	0	14th
2012	Formula 3 Euro Series	GU-Racing	9	0	0	0	0	0	15th
2016	Audi Sport TT Cup	N/A	14	0	0	0	1	170	6th
2017	Audi Sport TT Cup	N/A	13	5	4	3	11	259	**1st**
2017	Touring Car Endurance Series - TCR	Bonk Motorsport	1	0	0	1	0	0	NC
2018	ADAC GT Masters	Phoenix Racing	14	1	1	0	1	39	16th
2018	24H GT Series - GT4	Phoenix Racing	1	1	1	0	1	0	NC
2018	Super Taikyu - ST-X	Phoenix Racing Asia	1	0	0	0	0	19‡	9th‡
2019	ADAC GT Masters	Mann-Filter Team HTP	13	0	0	0	1	40	21st
2019	24H GT Series - A6	Winward Racing/HTP Motorsport							
2019	24H GT Series - GT4	Winward Racing							
2019	24 Hours of Nürburgring - SP9	GetSpeed Performance	1	0	0	0	0	N/A	6th
2020	24H GT Series - GT3 Pro	Toksport WRT	1	0	0	0	0	12	12th
2020	24H GT Series - GT3 Pro	HTP Winward Motorsport	1	0	0	0	0	12	12th
2020	Michelin Pilot Challenge - GT4	Winward Racing/HTP Motorsport	4	0	0	2	1	79	31st
2020	ADAC GT Masters	Knaus Team HTP Winward	14	1	1	0	2	112	6th
2020	GT World Challenge Europe Endurance Cup	HTP Motorsport	1	0	0	0	0	0	NC
2020	24 Hours of Nürburgring - SP9	Mercedes-AMG Team HRT Bilstein	1	0	0	0	0	N/A	9th
2021	GT World Challenge America - Pro	Winward Racing	7	0	1	1	4	78	5th
2021	Intercontinental GT Challenge	Winward Racing	2	0	0	0	0	0	NC
2021	IMSA SportsCar Championship - GTD	HTP Winward Motorsport	3	1	0	0	1	598	36th
2021	Deutsche Tourenwagen Masters	Mercedes-AMG Team Winward	16	1	1	0	3	129	7th
2021	GT World Challenge Europe Endurance Cup - Silver Cup	Winward Motorsport	3	0	0	0	0	30	16th
2021	24 Hours of Nürburgring - SP-X	Space Drive Racing	1	1	0	1	1	N/A	**1st**
2022	GT World Challenge America - Pro	Winward Racing	7	3	2	2	6	154	6th
2022	IMSA SportsCar Championship - GTD	Winward Racing	12	2	3	2	3	2714	5th
2022	Intercontinental GT Challenge	Winward Racing	3	0	0	0	1	25	11th
2022	GT World Challenge Europe Endurance Cup	SunEnergy1 Racing	1	0	0	0	0	0	NC
2022	24 Hours of Nürburgring - SP9	Mercedes-AMG Team Bilstein by HRT	1	0	0	0	0	N/A	7th
2023	ADAC GT Masters	Haupt Racing Team	2	0	0	0	1	26	22nd
2023	IMSA SportsCar Championship - GTD	Winward Racing	10	1	0	1	2	2431	12th
2023	GT World Challenge Europe Endurance Cup	Winward Racing	5	0	0	0	0	0	NC
2023	GT World Challenge Europe Endurance Cup - Gold Cup	Winward Racing	5	0	1	1	1	49	7th
2023	Intercontinental GT Challenge	Mercedes-AMG Craft-Bamboo Racing	1	0	0	0	0	9	25th
2023	Intercontinental GT Challenge	Winward Racing	1	0	0	0	0	9	25th
2023	Intercontinental GT Challenge	DXDT Racing	1	0	0	0	0	9	25th
2023	Intercontinental GT Challenge	SunEnergy1 Racing	1	0	0	0	0	9	25th
2023	GT World Challenge America - Pro-Am	DXDT Racing	1	0	0	0	0	0	NC
2023	British GT Championship - GT3	2 Seas Motorsport	1	0	0	0	0	1.5	26th
2023	24 Hours of Nürburgring - SP9	Mercedes-AMG Team Bilstein by HRT	1	0	1	0	1	N/A	**3rd**
2024	IMSA SportsCar Championship - GTD	Winward Racing	10	4	0	0	6	3266	**1st**
2024	Michelin Pilot Challenge - GS	Winward Racing	1	0	0	0	1	320	44th
2024	GT World Challenge America - Pro-Am	DXDT Racing	2	0	0	0	0	187	**3rd**
2024	GT World Challenge America - Pro-Am	Regulator Racing	11	2	2	5	6	187	**3rd**
2024	Nürburgring Langstrecken-Serie - SP9	Mercedes-AMG Team GetSpeed	2	0	0	0	0	*	*
2024	Intercontinental GT Challenge	Mercedes-AMG Team GetSpeed							
2024	24 Hours of Nürburgring - SP9	Mercedes-AMG Team GetSpeed	1	0	0	0	0	N/A	DNF
2024	GT World Challenge Europe Endurance Cup	AlManar Racing by GetSpeed	1	0	0	0	0	12	20th
2024	GT World Challenge Europe Endurance Cup	Boutsen VDS	1	0	0	0	0	12	20th
2024	International GT Open	Scuderia Villorba Corse	1	0	0	0	0	0	NC†
2025	IMSA SportsCar Championship - GTD	Winward Racing	10	3	1	1	4	3103	**1st**
2025	GT World Challenge Europe Endurance Cup	Winward Racing	1	0	0	0	0	0	NC
2025	Michelin Pilot Challenge - GS	Winward Racing	1	0	0	0	0	150	62nd
2025	GT World Challenge America - Pro-Am	Regulator Racing	13	3	6	4	5	156.5	**3rd**
2025	International GT Open	Team Motopark	2	0	0	0	1	15	17th
2026	IMSA SportsCar Championship - GTD	Winward Racing	10	5	1	0	6	3078	**1st**
2026	Michelin Pilot Challenge - GS	Winward Racing	1	1	0	0	1	350	47th
2026	GT World Challenge Europe Endurance Cup	GetSpeed Team Noble Racing	1	0	0	0	0	NC	0
2026	GT World Challenge Europe Endurance Cup	Team Motopark	1	0	0	0	0	NC	0
2026	GT World Challenge America - Pro-Am	JMF Motorsports	4	1	0	0	1	0	NC†
2026	24 Hours of Nürburgring - SP9 Pro-Am	SR Motorsport by Schnitzelalm	1	0	0	0	0	N/A	9th

‡ Team standings.
^{†} As Ellis was a guest driver, he was ineligible for championship points.
^{*} Season still in progress.

=== Complete Formula 3 Euro Series results ===
(key) (Races in bold indicate pole position) (Races in italics indicate fastest lap)

Year	Entrant	Chassis	Engine	1	2	3	4	5	6	7	8	9	10	11	12	13	14	15	16	17	18	19	20	21	22	23	24	DC	Points
2012	GU-Racing	Dallara F312/019	Mercedes	HOC; 1; 14	HOC; 2; 17†	HOC; 3; 16	BRH; 1	BRH; 2	BRH; 3	RBR; 1; 14	RBR; 2; 15	RBR; 3; 13	NOR; 1 Ret	NOR; 2; 21	NOR; 3 Ret	NÜR; 1	NÜR; 2	NÜR; 3	ZAN; 1	ZAN; 2	ZAN; 3	VAL; 1	VAL; 2	VAL; 3	HOC; 1	HOC; 2	HOC; 3	15th	0

^{†} Driver did not finish the race, but was classified as he completed over 90% of the race distance.

=== Complete FIA Formula 3 European Championship results ===
(key) (Races in bold indicate pole position) (Races in italics indicate fastest lap)

Year	Entrant	Engine	1	2	3	4	5	6	7	8	9	10	11	12	13	14	15	16	17	18	19	20	DC	Points
2012	GU-Racing	Mercedes	HOC; 1; 14	HOC; 2; 16	LEC; 1	LEC; 2	BRH; 1	BRH; 2	RBR; 1; 14	RBR; 2; 13	NOR; 1 Ret	NOR; 2 Ret	SPA; 1	SPA; 2	NÜR; 1	NÜR; 2	ZAN; 1	ZAN; 2	VAL; 1	VAL; 2	HOC; 1	HOC; 2	14th	0

=== Complete ADAC GT Masters results ===
(key) (Races in bold indicate pole position) (Races in italics indicate fastest lap)

Year	Team	Car	1	2	3	4	5	6	7	8	9	10	11	12	13	14	Pos	Points
2018	Phoenix Racing	Audi R8 LMS Evo	**OSC**; **1**; 1	OSC; 2 Ret	MST; 1 Ret	MST; 2; 13	RBR; 1; 8	RBR; 2 Ret	NÜR; 1; 19	NÜR; 2; 11	ZAN; 1; 5	ZAN; 2; 12	SAC; 1; 11	SAC; 2; 11	HOC; 1; 23	HOC; 2; 19	16th	39
2019	Mann-Filter Team HTP	Mercedes-AMG GT3	OSC; 1; 24	OSC; 2; 23	MST; 1; 14	MST; 2; 7	RBR; 1; 13	RBR; 2 DSQ	ZAN; 1; 7	ZAN; 2; 3	NÜR; 1; 29	NÜR; 2; 16	HOC; 1 Ret	HOC; 2 DNS	SAC; 1; 22	SAC; 2; 16	21st	40
2020	Knaus - Team HTP-Winward	Mercedes-AMG GT3 Evo	LAU1; 1; 18	LAU1; 2; 10	NÜR; 1; 6	NÜR; 2; 8	HOC; 1; 6	HOC; 2; 7	SAC; 1 Ret	SAC; 2; 5	RBR; 1; 6	RBR; 2; 10	LAU2; 1; 15	LAU2; 2 Ret	OSC; 1; 3	**OSC**; **2**; 1^{1}	6th	112
2023	Haupt Racing Team	Mercedes-AMG GT3 Evo	HOC; 1	HOC; 2	NOR; 1	NOR; 2	NÜR; 1	NÜR; 2	SAC; 1	SAC; 2	RBR; 1; 6	RBR; 2; 3	HOC; 1	HOC; 2			22nd	26

=== Complete GT World Challenge Europe results ===
==== GT World Challenge Europe Endurance Cup ====
(key) (Races in bold indicate pole position) (Races in italics indicate fastest lap)

Year	Team	Car	Class	1	2	3	4	5	6	7	Pos.	Points
2020	HTP Motorsport	Mercedes-AMG GT3 Evo	Silver	IMO	NÜR	SPA; 6H; 36	SPA; 12H; 27	SPA; 24H; 21	LEC		15th	27
2021	Winward Racing	Mercedes-AMG GT3 Evo	Silver	MNZ; 7	LEC; 20	SPA; 6H; 21	SPA; 12H; Ret	SPA; 24H; Ret	NÜR	CAT	16th	30
2022	SunEnergy1 Racing by SPS	Mercedes-AMG GT3 Evo	Pro-Am	IMO	LEC	SPA; 6H; 46	SPA; 12H; 39	SPA; 24H; 28	HOC	CAT	10th	28
2023	Winward Racing	Mercedes-AMG GT3 Evo	Gold	MNZ; 23	**LEC**; Ret	SPA; 6H; 56	SPA; 12H; 37	SPA; 24H; 38	NÜR; Ret	CAT; 15	7th	49
2024	AlManar Racing by GetSpeed	Mercedes-AMG GT3 Evo	Gold	LEC	SPA; 6H; 30	SPA; 12H; 23	SPA; 24H; 7				6th	43
2024	Boutsen VDS	Mercedes-AMG GT3 Evo	Pro					NÜR; 7	MNZ	JED	20th	12
2025	Winward Racing	Mercedes-AMG GT3 Evo	Gold	LEC	MNZ	SPA; 6H; 26	SPA; 12H; 59†	SPA; 24H; Ret	NÜR	CAT	18th	5
2026	GetSpeed Team Noble Racing	Mercedes-AMG GT3 Evo	Bronze	LEC; 46	MNZ	SPA; 6H	SPA; 12H	SPA; 24H	NÜR		NC	0
2026	Team Motopark	Mercedes-AMG GT3 Evo	Pro							ALG; Ret	NC	0

=== Complete Deutsche Tourenwagen Masters results ===
(key) (Races in bold indicate pole position) (Races in italics indicate fastest lap)

Year	Team	Car	1	2	3	4	5	6	7	8	9	10	11	12	13	14	15	16	Pos	Points
2021	Mercedes-AMG Team Winward	Mercedes-AMG GT3 Evo	MNZ; 1 Ret	MNZ; 2; 6	LAU; 1; 1	**LAU**; **2**; 4^{1}	ZOL; 1; 8	ZOL; 2; 16	NÜR; 1; 2^{2}	NÜR; 2 Ret	RBR; 1; 3	RBR; 2; 4	ASS; 1; 7	ASS; 2; 12	HOC; 1; 7	HOC; 2; 4	NOR; 1; 10	NOR; 2; 10	7th	129

=== Complete IMSA SportsCar Championship results ===
(key) (Races in bold indicate pole position; results in italics indicate fastest lap)

Year	Team	Class	Make	Engine	1	2	3	4	5	6	7	8	9	10	11	12	Pos.	Points
2021	HTP Winward Motorsport	GTD	Mercedes-AMG GT3 Evo	Mercedes-AMG M159 6.2 L V8	DAY; 1	SEB	MDO	DET	WGL	WGL	LIM	ELK	LGA	LBH	VIR	PET; 11	36th	598
2022	Winward Racing	GTD	Mercedes-AMG GT3 Evo	Mercedes-AMG M159 6.2 L V8	**DAY**; 6	SEB; 12	LBH; 14	**LGA**; 14	MDO; 5	DET; 10	WGL; 11	MOS; 2	LIM; 5	ELK; 1	VIR; 1	PET; 11	5th	2714
2023	Winward Racing	GTD	Mercedes-AMG GT3 Evo	Mercedes-AMG M159 6.2 L V8	DAY; 13	SEB; 18	LBH; 5	LGA; 12	WGL	MOS; 10	LIM; 9	ELK; 15	VIR; 3	IMS; 1	PET; 9		12th	2431
2024	Winward Racing	GTD	Mercedes-AMG GT3 Evo	Mercedes-AMG M159 6.2 L V8	DAY; 1	SEB; 1	LBH; 7	LGA; 1	WGL; 1	MOS; 2	ELK; 4	VIR; 3	IMS; 5	PET; 8			1st	3266
2025	Winward Racing	GTD	Mercedes-AMG GT3 Evo	Mercedes-AMG M159 6.2 L V8	DAY; 4	SEB; 1	LBH; 4	LGA; 1	WGL; 16	MOS; 2	**ELK**; 10	VIR; 1	IMS; 5	PET; 5			1st	3103
2026	Winward Racing	GTD	Mercedes-AMG GT3 Evo	Mercedes-AMG M159 6.2 L V8	DAY; 1	SEB; 18	LBH; 9	LGA; 5	WGL; 15	MOS; 1	ELK; 1	VIR; 1	IMS; 2	**PET**; 1			1st	3078

=== Complete British GT Championship results ===
(key) (Races in bold indicate pole position in class) (Races in italics indicate fastest lap in class)

Year	Team	Car	Class	1	2	3	4	5	6	7	8	9	DC	Points
2023	2 Seas Motorsport	Mercedes-AMG GT3 Evo	GT3	OUL; 1	OUL; 2	SIL; 1	DON; 1	SNE; 1	SNE; 2	ALG; 1	BRH; 1	DON; 1; 10	26th	1.5

Sporting positions
Preceded by Michael Lamotte	Formula Lista Junior; Champion; 2011	Succeeded by Levin Amweg
Preceded by Joonas Lappalainen	Audi Sport TT Cup; Champion; 2017	Succeeded by None (Series ended)
Preceded by Brian Sellers; Madison Snow	IMSA SportsCar Championship; GTD Champion; 2024-2026; With: Russell Ward	Succeeded by Incumbent
Preceded by Mikaël Grenier; Mike Skeen; Kenton Koch	Michelin Endurance Cup; GTD Champion; 2024; With: Russell Ward & Indy Dontje	Succeeded by Simon Mann; Alessandro Pier Guidi; Lilou Wadoux
Preceded by Simon Mann; Alessandro Pier Guidi; Lilou Wadoux	Michelin Endurance Cup; GTD Champion; 2026; With: Russell Ward & Indy Dontje	Succeeded by Incumbent
