= 2009 Formula Lista Junior season =

2009 Formula Lista Junior

Seasons
- ← 2008 2010 →

The 2009 Formula Lista Junior season was the tenth Formula Lista Junior season. It began on April 11 at Dijon-Prenois and ended on September 27 at Monza after twelve races. Kevin Giovesi was crowned series champion.

== Teams and drivers ==
- All cars are powered by BMW engines, and Mygale FB02 chassis.

Team	No	Driver	Rounds
(Switzerland) Daltec Racing	10	(Switzerland) Mauro Calamia	All
(Switzerland) Daltec Racing	11	(Italy) Vittoria Piria	1
(Switzerland) Daltec Racing	25	(Switzerland) Florian Revaz	1–5
(Switzerland) Daltec Racing	26	(Italy) Kevin Giovesi	All
(Switzerland) Daltec Racing	27	(Switzerland) André Maurer	1–4, 6
(Switzerland) Daltec Racing	28	(Switzerland) Yannick Mettler	5
(Switzerland) Daltec Racing	29	(Switzerland) Christof von Grünigen	All
(Switzerland) Daltec Racing	31	(Italy) Tommaso Menchini	3–6
(Switzerland) Daltec Racing	32	(Switzerland) Dominik Kocher	4
(Switzerland) Daltec Racing	48	(Switzerland) John Votta	All
(Switzerland) Felix Racing Team	21	(Switzerland) Sven Ackermann	All
(Switzerland) Felix Racing Team	22	(Switzerland) Maurizio Manna	All
(Switzerland) Felix Racing Team	23	(Switzerland) Robyn Lehmann	All
(Switzerland) Felix Racing Team	30	(Switzerland) Luigi Stanco	All
(Switzerland) Team Gugger	24	(Switzerland) Andrina Gugger	All
(Germany) GU-Racing International	33	(Germany) Eric Neuber	All
(Switzerland) TTR Motorsport	35	(United States) Michael Lamotte	1–5
(Switzerland) TTR Motorsport	36	(Switzerland) Patrick Kaufmann	1–2
(Switzerland) Hope Pole Vision Racing	37	(Switzerland) Sammy Wasem	6
(Switzerland) Hope Pole Vision Racing	38	(Sweden) Måns Grenhagen	1–5
(Switzerland) Hope Pole Vision Racing	39	(Switzerland) Michael Tinguely	All
(Switzerland) Jo Zeller Racing	44	(Switzerland) Sandro Zeller	All

== Race calendar and results ==
Round		Circuit	Date	Pole position	Fastest lap	Winning driver	Winning team
1	R1	(France) Dijon-Prenois	11 April	(Switzerland) Christof von Grünigen	(Switzerland) Andrina Gugger	(Switzerland) Andrina Gugger	(Switzerland) Team Gugger
1	R2	(France) Dijon-Prenois	12 April	(Sweden) Måns Grenhagen	(Switzerland) Sandro Zeller	(Switzerland) Michael Tinguely	(Switzerland) Hope Pole Vision Racing
2	R1	(Germany) Nürburgring	16 May	(Italy) Kevin Giovesi	(Sweden) Måns Grenhagen	(Italy) Kevin Giovesi	(Switzerland) Daltec Racing
2	R2	(Germany) Nürburgring	17 May	(Italy) Kevin Giovesi	(Italy) Kevin Giovesi	(Italy) Kevin Giovesi	(Switzerland) Daltec Racing
3	R1	(France) Circuit de Nevers Magny-Cours	8 August	(Switzerland) Sven Ackermann	(Sweden) Måns Grenhagen	(Switzerland) Sven Ackermann	(Switzerland) Felix Racing Team
3	R2	(France) Circuit de Nevers Magny-Cours	9 August	(Italy) Kevin Giovesi	(Sweden) Måns Grenhagen	(Italy) Kevin Giovesi	(Switzerland) Daltec Racing
4	R1	(Germany) Hockenheimring	22 August	(Italy) Kevin Giovesi	(Italy) Kevin Giovesi	(Italy) Kevin Giovesi	(Switzerland) Daltec Racing
4	R2	(Germany) Hockenheimring	23 August	(Italy) Kevin Giovesi	(Sweden) Måns Grenhagen	(Italy) Kevin Giovesi	(Switzerland) Daltec Racing
5	R1	(France) Dijon-Prenois	5 September	(Switzerland) Sandro Zeller	(Switzerland) Robyn Lehmann	(Switzerland) Sandro Zeller	(Switzerland) Jo Zeller Racing
5	R2	(France) Dijon-Prenois	6 September	(Switzerland) Christof von Grünigen	(Switzerland) Christof von Grünigen	(Switzerland) Christof von Grünigen	(Switzerland) Daltec Racing
6	R1	(Italy) Autodromo Nazionale Monza	26 September	(Switzerland) Michael Tinguely	(Switzerland) Mauro Calamia	(Switzerland) Michael Tinguely	(Switzerland) Hope Pole Vision Racing
6	R2	(Italy) Autodromo Nazionale Monza	27 September	(Italy) Kevin Giovesi	(Switzerland) Sven Ackermann	(Switzerland) Michael Tinguely	(Switzerland) Hope Pole Vision Racing

== Championship standings ==
- Points are awarded as follows:

Position	1st	2nd	3rd	4th	5th	6th	7th	8th	9th	10th	Pole position	Fastest lap
Points	20	15	12	10	8	6	4	3	2	1	**2**	2

Pos	Driver	DIJ (France)		NÜR (Germany)		MAG (France)		HOC (Germany)		DIJ (France)		MZA (Italy)		Pts
1	(Italy) Kevin Giovesi	13	2	**1**	**1**	2	**1**	**1**	**1**	Ret	4	2	**2**	186
2	(Switzerland) Sven Ackermann	4	3	2	Ret	**1**	3	4	4	8	2	Ret	4	121
3	(Switzerland) Michael Tinguely	3	1	Ret	5	4	4	5	Ret	7	7	**1**	1	118
4	(Switzerland) Christof von Grünigen	**2**	7	5	3	3	7	8	2	2	**1**	7	Ret	118
5	(Switzerland) Sandro Zeller	5	5	4	2	6	5	2	3	**1**	11	10	5	115
6	(Switzerland) Robyn Lehmann	Ret	6	10	10	8	9	3	5	3	3	4	6	75
7	(Switzerland) Andrina Gugger	1	4	6	14	7	6	10	7	Ret	5	5	8	72
8	(Sweden) Måns Grenhagen	6	**Ret**	7	13	5	2	7	6	11	Ret			53
9	(Germany) Eric Neuber	7	10	8	7	Ret	8	6	Ret	4	Ret	Ret	3	43
10	(Switzerland) Mauro Calamia	11	13	13	9	9	10	12	8	5	Ret	3	7	34
11	(Switzerland) Luigi Stanco	9	11	3	4	11	15	14	13	Ret	12	Ret	DNS	24
12	(Switzerland) Maurizio Manna	8	8	11	11	14	14	9	Ret	9	6	Ret	12	16
13	(Italy) Tommaso Menchini					12	11	15	9	6	8	8	Ret	14
14	(Switzerland) André Maurer	14	14	14	15	13	16	16	10			6	10	8
15	(Switzerland) John Votta	Ret	12	12	8	16	12	11	Ret	12	9	Ret	9	7
16	(United States) Michael Lamotte	10	9	9	Ret	10	13	Ret	11	13	10			7
17	(Switzerland) Patrick Kaufmann	Ret	16	Ret	6									6
18	(Switzerland) Sammy Wasem											9	11	2
19	(Switzerland) Yannick Mettler									10	Ret			1
20	(Switzerland) Florian Revaz	12	Ret	15	12	15	17	13	12	14	Ret			0
21	(Switzerland) Dominik Kocher							17	14					0
22	(Italy) Vittoria Piria	Ret	15											0
Pos	Driver	DIJ (France)		NÜR (Germany)		MAG (France)		HOC (Germany)		DIJ (France)		MZA (Italy)		Pts

Colour	Result
Gold	Winner
Silver	Second place
Bronze	Third place
Green	Points classification
Blue	Non-points classification
Blue	Non-classified finish (NC)
Purple	Retired, not classified (Ret)
Red	Did not qualify (DNQ)
Red	Did not pre-qualify (DNPQ)
Black	Disqualified (DSQ)
White	Did not start (DNS)
White	Withdrew (WD)
White	Race cancelled (C)
Blank	Did not practice (DNP)
Blank	Did not arrive (DNA)
Blank	Excluded (EX)

**Bold** – Pole
Italics – Fastest Lap
