= 2025 Petit Le Mans =

Sportscar endurance race in Georgia, US

The layout of Road Atlanta, where the race took place

The 2025 Petit Le Mans (officially known as the 2025 Motul Petit Le Mans) was a sports car race held at Road Atlanta in Braselton, Georgia, on October 11, 2025. It was the eleventh and final round of the 2025 IMSA SportsCar Championship, as well as the fifth and final round of the Michelin Endurance Cup. The event was the 28th running of the Petit Le Mans since its inception.

== Background ==
=== Preview ===
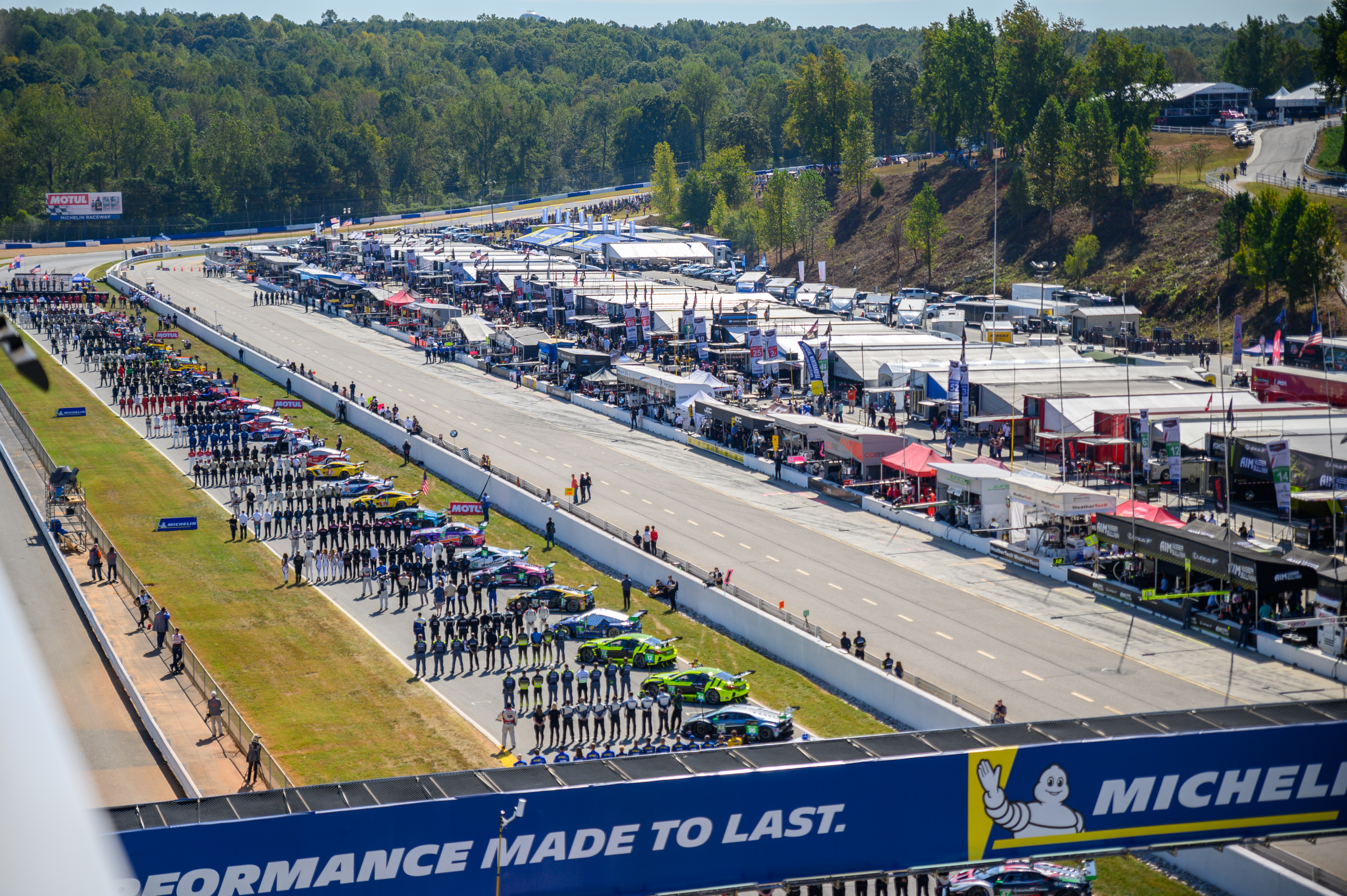
Road Atlanta, where the race took place

International Motor Sports Association (IMSA) president John Doonan confirmed the race was a part of the 2025 IMSA SportsCar Championship (IMSA SCC) in March 2024. It was the twelfth consecutive year the IMSA SCC hosted the race at Road Atlanta. The 2025 Petit Le Mans was the final of eleven scheduled sports car races of 2025 by IMSA, and was held at the twelve-turn 2.540 mi (4.088 km) Road Atlanta on October 12, 2025.

=== Standings before race ===
Preceding the event, Matt Campbell and Mathieu Jaminet led the GTP Drivers' Championship with 2582 points, 131 ahead of Porsche teammates Felipe Nasr and Nick Tandy. Dries Vanthoor and Philipp Eng sat in third, 145 points behind Campbell and Jaminet. The LMP2 Drivers' Championship was led by Dane Cameron and PJ Hyett with 1972 points, 85 points ahead of second-placed Daniel Goldburg. Felipe Fraga and Gar Robinson sat in third, a further 181 points behind. The GTD Pro Drivers' Championship saw Antonio Garcia and Alexander Sims leading with 2942 points, 18 points ahead of second-placed Albert Costa. Mike Rockenfeller and Sebastian Priaulx sat in third, 169 points behind Garcia and Sims. In GTD, Philip Ellis and Russell Ward led the Drivers' Championship with 25817 points, 224 points ahead of second-placed Casper Stevenson. Kenton Koch sat in third place, a further 29 points behind. The Teams' Championships were led by Porsche Penske Motorsport, AO Racing, Corvette Racing by Pratt Miller Motorsports, and Winward Racing, respectively, whilst the Manufacturers' Championships were led by Porsche in GTP, Chevrolet in GTD Pro, and Mercedes-AMG in GTD.

== Qualifying ==
Friday's afternoon qualifying was broken into four sessions, with one session for the GTP, LMP2, GTD Pro, and GTD classes each. The rules dictated that all teams nominated a driver to qualify their cars, with the Pro-Am LMP2 class requiring a Bronze rated driver to qualify the car. The competitors' fastest lap times determined the starting order. The competitors' fastest lap times determined the starting order. IMSA then arranged the grid to put GTPs ahead of the LMP2, GTD Pro, and GTD cars.

=== Qualifying results ===
Pole positions in each class are indicated in bold and with ‡.

Pos.	Class	No.	Entry	Driver	Time	Gap	Grid
1	**GTP**	**60**	**(United States) Meyer Shank Racing with Curb-Agajanian**	**(United Kingdom) Tom Blomqvist**	**1:09.628**	—	1‡
2	GTP	31	(United States) Cadillac Whelen	(United Kingdom) Jack Aitken	1:09.827	+0.199	2
3	GTP	93	(United States) Meyer Shank Racing with Curb-Agajanian	(United Kingdom) Nick Yelloly	1:09.908	+0.280	3
4	GTP	7	(Germany) Porsche Penske Motorsport	(Brazil) Felipe Nasr	1:10.241	+0.613	4
5	GTP	23	(United States) Aston Martin THOR Team	(United Kingdom) Ross Gunn	1:10.254	+0.626	5
6	GTP	6	(Germany) Porsche Penske Motorsport	(Australia) Matt Campbell	1:10.284	+0.656	6
7	GTP	63	(Italy) Automobili Lamborghini Squadra Corse	(France) Romain Grosjean	1:10.309	+.0681	7
8	GTP	10	(United States) Cadillac Wayne Taylor Racing	(Portugal) Filipe Albuquerque	1:10.314	+0.686	8
9	GTP	24	(United States) BMW M Team RLL	(Belgium) Dries Vanthoor	1:10.360	+0.732	9
10	GTP	25	(United States) BMW M Team RLL	(South Africa) Sheldon van der Linde	1:10.388	+0.760	10
11	GTP	40	(United States) Cadillac Wayne Taylor Racing	(United States) Jordan Taylor	1:10.649	+1.021	11
12	GTP	85	(United States) JDC-Miller MotorSports	(United States) Max Esterson	1:10.939	+1.311	12
13	LMP2	11	(United States) TDS Racing	(United States) Steven Thomas	1:13.157	+3.529	24^{1}
14	**LMP2**	**43**	**(Poland) Inter Europol Competition**	**(United States) Jeremy Clarke**	**1:13.397**	**+3.769**	13‡
15	LMP2	99	(United States) AO Racing	(United States) P. J. Hyett	1:13.419	+3.791	14
16	LMP2	22	(United States) United Autosports USA	(United States) Dan Goldburg	1:13.614	+3.986	15
17	LMP2	2	(United States) United Autosports USA	(United States) Nick Boulle	1:13.868	+4.240	16
18	LMP2	74	(United States) Riley	(United States) Gar Robinson	1:14.356	+4.728	17
19	LMP2	18	(United States) Era Motorsport	(Canada) Tobias Lütke	1:14.387	+4.759	18
20	LMP2	88	(Italy) AF Corse	(Argentina) Luis Pérez Companc	1:14.427	+4.799	19
21	LMP2	73	(United States) Pratt Miller Motorsports	(Canada) Chris Cumming	1:14.705	+5.077	20
22	LMP2	52	(United States) PR1/Mathiasen Motorsports	(United States) Naveen Rao	1:14.755	+5.127	21
23	LMP2	8	(Canada) Tower Motorsports	(Canada) John Farano	1:15.187	+5.559	22
24	**GTD**	**47**	**(Italy) Cetilar Racing**	**(Italy) Lorenzo Patrese**	**1:18.316**	**+8.688**	35‡
25	**GTD Pro**	**48**	**(United States) Paul Miller Racing**	**(United Kingdom) Dan Harper**	**1:18.523**	**+8.895**	25‡
26	GTD	021	(United States) Triarsi Competizione	(Italy) Riccardo Agostini	1:18.605	+8.977	36
27	GTD	19	(United States) van der Steur Racing	(France) Valentin Hasse-Clot	1:18.690	+9.062	37
28	GTD Pro	14	(United States) Vasser Sullivan Racing	(United States) Aaron Telitz	1:18.690	+9.062	26
29	GTD Pro	4	(United States) Corvette Racing by Pratt Miller Motorsports	(Netherlands) Nicky Catsburg	1:18.747	+9.119	27
30	GTD Pro	81	(United States) DragonSpeed	(Spain) Albert Costa	1:18.763	+9.135	28
31	GTD Pro	77	(United States) AO Racing	(Germany) Laurin Heinrich	1:18.797	+9.169	29
32	GTD	21	(Italy) AF Corse	(France) Lilou Wadoux	1:18.821	+9.193	38
33	GTD	57	(United States) Winward Racing	(Switzerland) Philip Ellis	1:18.831	+9.203	39
34	GTD Pro	1	(United States) Paul Miller Racing	(United States) Neil Verhagen	1:18.832	+9.204	30
35	GTD	27	(United States) Heart of Racing Team	(United Kingdom) Casper Stevenson	1:18.891	+9.263	40
36	GTD	023	(United States) Triarsi Competizione	(United States) Kenton Koch	1:18.980	+9.352	41
37	GTD	80	(United States) Lone Star Racing	(Australia) Scott Andrews	1:19.081	+9.453	42
38	GTD Pro	64	(Canada) Ford Multimatic Motorsports	(United Kingdom) Sebastian Priaulx	1:19.087	+9.459	31
39	GTD	96	(United States) Turner Motorsport	(United States) Patrick Gallagher	1:19.108	+9.480	43
40	GTD Pro	3	(United States) Corvette Racing by Pratt Miller Motorsports	(Spain) Antonio García	1:19.122	+9.494	32
41	GTD	34	(United States) Conquest Racing	(United States) Manny Franco	1:19.397	+9.760	44
42	GTD Pro	65	(Canada) Ford Multimatic Motorsports	(Belgium) Frédéric Vervisch	1:19.486	+9.858	33
43	GTD	12	(United States) Vasser Sullivan Racing	(United States) Frankie Montecalvo	1:19.510	+9.882	45
44	GTD	45	(United States) Wayne Taylor Racing	(United States) Trent Hindman	1:19.629	+10.001	46
45	GTD	66	(United States) Gradient Racing	(United States) Joey Hand	1:19.724	+10.096	47
46	GTD	78	(United States) Forte Racing	(United States) Eric Filgueiras	1:19.779	+10.150	48
47	GTD	70	(United Kingdom) Inception Racing	(United States) Brendan Iribe	1:19.856	+10.228	49
48	GTD	120	(United States) Wright Motorsports	(United States) Adam Adelson	1:20.321	+10.693	50
49	GTD	36	(United States) DXDT Racing	(Turkey) Salih Yoluç	1:20.364	+10.736	51
50	GTD	44	(United States) Magnus Racing	(United States) John Potter	1:20.417	+10.789	52
51	GTD	13	(Canada) AWA	(Canada) Orey Fidani	1:21.157	+11.529	53
52	LMP2	04	(Portugal) CrowdStrike Racing by APR	(United States) George Kurtz	No Time Established^{2}		23
53	GTD Pro	9	(Canada) Pfaff Motorsports	No Time Established			34
Sources:

- ^{1} The No. 11 TDS Racing entry was moved to the back of the LMP2 classification for violating competition rules regarding the car's bodywork mass.
- ^{2}The No. 04 CrowdStrike car had its two fastest laps deleted as penalty for causing a red flag during its qualifying session

== Race ==
=== Post-race ===
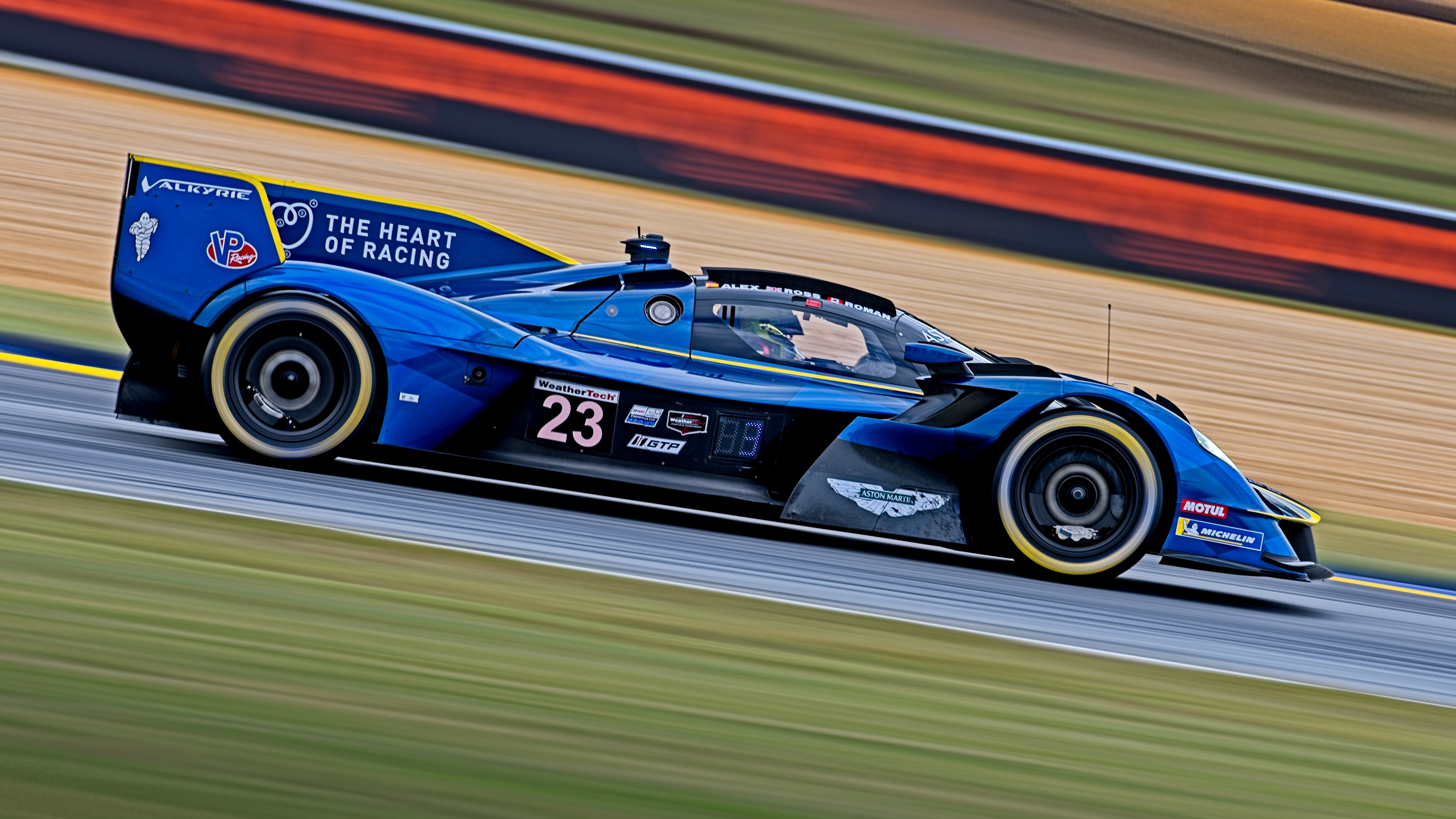
Aston Martin THOR took the first podium for the Valkyrie AMR-LMH in any competition

Campbell and Jaminet took the GTP Drivers' Championship with 2907 points. They were 187 points clear of Aitken. With 2254 points, Cameron and Hyett won the LMP2 Drivers' Championship, 100 points clear of Thomas. García and Sims took the GTD Pro Drivers' Championship with 3265 points. They were 73 points clear of Costa. Ellis and Ward won the GTD Drivers' Championship with 3103 points, 195 points ahead of Koch. Stevenson was third with 2898 points. Porsche, Chevrolet, and Mercedes-AMG won their respective Manufactures' Championships, while Porsche Penske Motorsport, AO Racing, Corvette Racing by Pratt Miller Motorsports, and Winward Racing won their respective Teams' Championships.

=== Race results ===
Class winners are in bold and ‡.

Pos	Class	No	Team	Drivers	Chassis	Laps	Time/Retired
Pos	Class	No	Team	Drivers	Engine	Laps	Time/Retired
1	**GTP**	**31**	**(United States) Cadillac Whelen**	**(United Kingdom) Jack Aitken (New Zealand) Earl Bamber (Denmark) Frederik Vesti**	**Cadillac V-Series.R**	**436**	**10:00:37.101**
1	**GTP**	**31**	**(United States) Cadillac Whelen**	**(United Kingdom) Jack Aitken (New Zealand) Earl Bamber (Denmark) Frederik Vesti**	**Cadillac LMC55R 5.5 L V8**	**436**	**10:00:37.101**
2	GTP	23	(United States) Aston Martin THOR Team	(United Kingdom) Ross Gunn (Canada) Roman De Angelis (Spain) Alex Riberas	Aston Martin Valkyrie	436	+5.182
2	GTP	23	(United States) Aston Martin THOR Team	(United Kingdom) Ross Gunn (Canada) Roman De Angelis (Spain) Alex Riberas	Aston Martin RA 6.5 L V12	436	+5.182
3	GTP	6	(Germany) Porsche Penske Motorsport	(France) Mathieu Jaminet (Australia) Matt Campbell (Belgium) Laurens Vanthoor	Porsche 963	436	+12.745
3	GTP	6	(Germany) Porsche Penske Motorsport	(France) Mathieu Jaminet (Australia) Matt Campbell (Belgium) Laurens Vanthoor	Porsche 9RD 4.6 L twin-turbo V8	436	+12.745
4	GTP	63	(Italy) Automobili Lamborghini Squadra Corse	(France) Romain Grosjean (Italy) Daniil Kvyat (Switzerland) Edoardo Mortara	Lamborghini SC63	436	+34.428
4	GTP	63	(Italy) Automobili Lamborghini Squadra Corse	(France) Romain Grosjean (Italy) Daniil Kvyat (Switzerland) Edoardo Mortara	Lamborghini 3.8 L twin-turbo V8	436	+34.428
5	GTP	60	(United States) Meyer Shank Racing with Curb-Agajanian	(United Kingdom) Tom Blomqvist (United States) Colin Braun (New Zealand) Scott Dixon	Acura ARX-06	436	+41.116
5	GTP	60	(United States) Meyer Shank Racing with Curb-Agajanian	(United Kingdom) Tom Blomqvist (United States) Colin Braun (New Zealand) Scott Dixon	Acura AR24e 2.4 L twin-turbo V6	436	+41.116
6	GTP	10	(United States) Cadillac Wayne Taylor Racing	(Portugal) Filipe Albuquerque (United States) Ricky Taylor (United Kingdom) Will Stevens	Cadillac V-Series.R	436	+1:07.029
6	GTP	10	(United States) Cadillac Wayne Taylor Racing	(Portugal) Filipe Albuquerque (United States) Ricky Taylor (United Kingdom) Will Stevens	Cadillac LMC55R 5.5 L V8	436	+1:07.029
7	GTP	93	(United States) Meyer Shank Racing with Curb-Agajanian	(United Kingdom) Nick Yelloly (Netherlands) Renger van der Zande (France) Tristan Vautier	Acura ARX-06	435	+1 Lap
7	GTP	93	(United States) Meyer Shank Racing with Curb-Agajanian	(United Kingdom) Nick Yelloly (Netherlands) Renger van der Zande (France) Tristan Vautier	Acura AR24e 2.4 L twin-turbo V6	435	+1 Lap
8	GTP	40	(United States) Cadillac Wayne Taylor Racing	(Switzerland) Louis Delétraz (United States) Jordan Taylor (France) Norman Nato	Cadillac V-Series.R	435	+1 Lap
8	GTP	40	(United States) Cadillac Wayne Taylor Racing	(Switzerland) Louis Delétraz (United States) Jordan Taylor (France) Norman Nato	Cadillac LMC55R 5.5 L V8	435	+1 Lap
9	GTP	24	(United States) BMW M Team RLL	(Austria) Philipp Eng (Belgium) Dries Vanthoor (Denmark) Kevin Magnussen	BMW M Hybrid V8	435	+1 Lap
9	GTP	24	(United States) BMW M Team RLL	(Austria) Philipp Eng (Belgium) Dries Vanthoor (Denmark) Kevin Magnussen	BMW P66/3 4.0 L twin-turbo V8	435	+1 Lap
10	GTP	7	(Germany) Porsche Penske Motorsport	(Brazil) Felipe Nasr (United Kingdom) Nick Tandy (Belgium) Laurens Vanthoor	Porsche 963	435	+1 Lap
10	GTP	7	(Germany) Porsche Penske Motorsport	(Brazil) Felipe Nasr (United Kingdom) Nick Tandy (Belgium) Laurens Vanthoor	Porsche 9RD 4.6 L twin-turbo V8	435	+1 Lap
11	GTP	25	(United States) BMW M Team RLL	(South Africa) Sheldon van der Linde (Germany) Marco Wittmann (Netherlands) Robin Frijns	BMW M Hybrid V8	435	+1 Lap
11	GTP	25	(United States) BMW M Team RLL	(South Africa) Sheldon van der Linde (Germany) Marco Wittmann (Netherlands) Robin Frijns	BMW P66/3 4.0 L twin-turbo V8	435	+1 Lap
12	GTP	85	(United States) JDC-Miller MotorSports	(United States) Max Esterson (Netherlands) Tijmen van der Helm (Switzerland) Neel Jani	Porsche 963	433	+3 Laps
12	GTP	85	(United States) JDC-Miller MotorSports	(United States) Max Esterson (Netherlands) Tijmen van der Helm (Switzerland) Neel Jani	Porsche 9RD 4.6 L twin-turbo V8	433	+3 Laps
13	**LMP2**	**11**	**(United States) TDS Racing**	**(United States) Steven Thomas (New Zealand) Hunter McElrea (Denmark) Mikkel Jensen**	**Oreca 07**	**426**	**+10 Laps‡**
13	**LMP2**	**11**	**(United States) TDS Racing**	**(United States) Steven Thomas (New Zealand) Hunter McElrea (Denmark) Mikkel Jensen**	**Gibson GK428 4.2 L V8**	**426**	**+10 Laps‡**
14	LMP2	43	(Poland) Inter Europol Competition	(France) Tom Dillmann (United States) Bijoy Garg (United States) Jeremy Clarke	Oreca 07	426	+10 Laps
14	LMP2	43	(Poland) Inter Europol Competition	(France) Tom Dillmann (United States) Bijoy Garg (United States) Jeremy Clarke	Gibson GK428 4.2 L V8	426	+10 Laps
15	LMP2	18	(United States) Era Motorsport	(Canada) Tobias Lütke (Denmark) David Heinemeier Hansson (United Kingdom) Oliver Jarvis	Oreca 07	426	+10 Laps
15	LMP2	18	(United States) Era Motorsport	(Canada) Tobias Lütke (Denmark) David Heinemeier Hansson (United Kingdom) Oliver Jarvis	Gibson GK428 4.2 L V8	426	+10 Laps
16	LMP2	52	(United States) PR1/Mathiasen Motorsports	(United States) Naveen Rao (Canada) Benjamin Pedersen (United States) Logan Sargeant	Oreca 07	426	+10 Laps
16	LMP2	52	(United States) PR1/Mathiasen Motorsports	(United States) Naveen Rao (Canada) Benjamin Pedersen (United States) Logan Sargeant	Gibson GK428 4.2 L V8	426	+10 Laps
17	LMP2	88	(Italy) AF Corse	(Argentina) Luis Pérez Companc (Argentina) Matías Pérez Companc (Denmark) Nicklas Nielsen	Oreca 07	425	+11 Laps
17	LMP2	88	(Italy) AF Corse	(Argentina) Luis Pérez Companc (Argentina) Matías Pérez Companc (Denmark) Nicklas Nielsen	Gibson GK428 4.2 L V8	425	+11 Laps
18	LMP2	99	(United States) AO Racing	(United States) Dane Cameron (United States) P. J. Hyett (United Kingdom) Jonny Edgar	Oreca 07	425	+11 Laps
18	LMP2	99	(United States) AO Racing	(United States) Dane Cameron (United States) P. J. Hyett (United Kingdom) Jonny Edgar	Gibson GK428 4.2 L V8	425	+11 Laps
19	LMP2	73	(United States) Pratt Miller Motorsports	(Canada) Chris Cumming (Brazil) Pietro Fittipaldi (Republic of Ireland) James Roe	Oreca 07	422	+14 Laps
19	LMP2	73	(United States) Pratt Miller Motorsports	(Canada) Chris Cumming (Brazil) Pietro Fittipaldi (Republic of Ireland) James Roe	Gibson GK428 4.2 L V8	422	+14 Laps
20	LMP2	74	(United States) Riley	(Brazil) Felipe Fraga (United States) Gar Robinson (Australia) Josh Burdon	Oreca 07	421	+15 Laps
20	LMP2	74	(United States) Riley	(Brazil) Felipe Fraga (United States) Gar Robinson (Australia) Josh Burdon	Gibson GK428 4.2 L V8	421	+15 Laps
21	LMP2	2	(United States) United Autosports USA	(United Kingdom) Ben Hanley (United States) Nick Boulle (United States) Juan Manuel Correa	Oreca 07	412	+24 Laps
21	LMP2	2	(United States) United Autosports USA	(United Kingdom) Ben Hanley (United States) Nick Boulle (United States) Juan Manuel Correa	Gibson GK428 4.2 L V8	412	+24 Laps
22	LMP2	04	(Portugal) CrowdStrike Racing by APR	(United States) George Kurtz (United Kingdom) Alex Quinn (United Kingdom) Toby Sowery	Oreca 07	406	+30 Laps
22	LMP2	04	(Portugal) CrowdStrike Racing by APR	(United States) George Kurtz (United Kingdom) Alex Quinn (United Kingdom) Toby Sowery	Gibson GK428 4.2 L V8	406	+30 Laps
23	**GTD Pro**	**48**	**(United States) Paul Miller Racing**	**(United Kingdom) Dan Harper (Germany) Max Hesse (United States) Connor De Phillippi**	**BMW M4 GT3 Evo**	**406**	**+30 Laps‡**
23	**GTD Pro**	**48**	**(United States) Paul Miller Racing**	**(United Kingdom) Dan Harper (Germany) Max Hesse (United States) Connor De Phillippi**	**BMW P58 3.0 L Twin Turbo I6**	**406**	**+30 Laps‡**
24	GTD Pro	4	(United States) Corvette Racing by Pratt Miller Motorsports	(Netherlands) Nicky Catsburg (United States) Tommy Milner (Argentina) Nico Varrone	Chevrolet Corvette Z06 GT3.R	405	+31 Laps
24	GTD Pro	4	(United States) Corvette Racing by Pratt Miller Motorsports	(Netherlands) Nicky Catsburg (United States) Tommy Milner (Argentina) Nico Varrone	Chevrolet LT6 5.5 L V8	405	+31 Laps
25	GTD Pro	3	(United States) Corvette Racing by Pratt Miller Motorsports	(Spain) Antonio García (United Kingdom) Alexander Sims (Spain) Daniel Juncadella	Chevrolet Corvette Z06 GT3.R	405	+31 Laps
25	GTD Pro	3	(United States) Corvette Racing by Pratt Miller Motorsports	(Spain) Antonio García (United Kingdom) Alexander Sims (Spain) Daniel Juncadella	**Chevrolet LT6 5.5 L V8**	405	+31 Laps
26	**GTD**	**21**	**(Italy) AF Corse**	**(United States) Simon Mann (Italy) Alessandro Pier Guidi (France) Lilou Wadoux**	**Ferrari 296 GT3**	**405**	**+31 Laps‡**
26	**GTD**	**21**	**(Italy) AF Corse**	**(United States) Simon Mann (Italy) Alessandro Pier Guidi (France) Lilou Wadoux**	**Ferrari F163CE 3.0 L Turbo V6**	**405**	**+31 Laps‡**
27	GTD	023	(United States) Triarsi Competizione	(United States) Onofrio Triarsi (United States) Kenton Koch (United Kingdom) James Calado	Ferrari 296 GT3	405	+31 Laps
27	GTD	023	(United States) Triarsi Competizione	(United States) Onofrio Triarsi (United States) Kenton Koch (United Kingdom) James Calado	Ferrari F163CE 3.0 L Turbo V6	405	+31 Laps
28	GTD Pro	64	(Canada) Ford Multimatic Motorsports	(United Kingdom) Sebastian Priaulx (Germany) Mike Rockenfeller (United Kingdom) Ben Barker	Ford Mustang GT3	405	+31 Laps
28	GTD Pro	64	(Canada) Ford Multimatic Motorsports	(United Kingdom) Sebastian Priaulx (Germany) Mike Rockenfeller (United Kingdom) Ben Barker	Ford Coyote 5.4 L V8	405	+31 Laps
29	GTD Pro	65	(Canada) Ford Multimatic Motorsports	(Germany) Christopher Mies (Belgium) Frédéric Vervisch (Norway) Dennis Olsen	Ford Mustang GT3	405	+31 Laps
29	GTD Pro	65	(Canada) Ford Multimatic Motorsports	(Germany) Christopher Mies (Belgium) Frédéric Vervisch (Norway) Dennis Olsen	Ford Coyote 5.4 L V8	405	+31 Laps
30	GTD	12	(United States) Vasser Sullivan Racing	(United Kingdom) Jack Hawksworth (Canada) Parker Thompson (United States) Frankie Montecalvo	Lexus RC F GT3	405	+31 Laps
30	GTD	12	(United States) Vasser Sullivan Racing	(United Kingdom) Jack Hawksworth (Canada) Parker Thompson (United States) Frankie Montecalvo	Toyota 2UR-GSE 5.4 L V8	405	+31 Laps
31	GTD	27	(United States) Heart of Racing Team	(United Kingdom) Casper Stevenson (United Kingdom) Tom Gamble (Canada) Zacharie Robichon	Aston Martin Vantage AMR GT3 Evo	405	+31 Laps
31	GTD	27	(United States) Heart of Racing Team	(United Kingdom) Casper Stevenson (United Kingdom) Tom Gamble (Canada) Zacharie Robichon	Aston Martin M177 4.0 L Turbo V8	405	+31 Laps
32	GTD	57	(United States) Winward Racing	(Switzerland) Philip Ellis (United States) Russell Ward (Netherlands) Indy Dontje	Mercedes-AMG GT3 Evo	404	+32 Laps
32	GTD	57	(United States) Winward Racing	(Switzerland) Philip Ellis (United States) Russell Ward (Netherlands) Indy Dontje	Mercedes-AMG M159 6.2 L V8	404	+32 Laps
33	GTD	120	(United States) Wright Motorsports	(United States) Adam Adelson (United States) Elliott Skeer (Australia) Tom Sargent	Porsche 911 GT3 R (992)	404	+32 Laps
33	GTD	120	(United States) Wright Motorsports	(United States) Adam Adelson (United States) Elliott Skeer (Australia) Tom Sargent	Porsche M97/80 4.2 L Flat-6	404	+32 Laps
34	GTD	36	(United States) DXDT Racing	(United States) Alec Udell (Republic of Ireland) Charlie Eastwood (Turkey) Salih Yoluç	Chevrolet Corvette Z06 GT3.R	404	+32 Laps
34	GTD	36	(United States) DXDT Racing	(United States) Alec Udell (Republic of Ireland) Charlie Eastwood (Turkey) Salih Yoluç	Chevrolet LT6 5.5 L V8	404	+32 Laps
35	GTD Pro	14	(United States) Vasser Sullivan Racing	(United States) Aaron Telitz (United Kingdom) Ben Barnicoat (United States) Kyle Kirkwood	Lexus RC F GT3	404	+32 Laps
35	GTD Pro	14	(United States) Vasser Sullivan Racing	(United States) Aaron Telitz (United Kingdom) Ben Barnicoat (United States) Kyle Kirkwood	Toyota 2UR-GSE 5.4 L V8	404	+32 Laps
36	GTD	96	(United States) Turner Motorsport	(United States) Robby Foley (United States) Patrick Gallagher (United States) Jake Walker	BMW M4 GT3 Evo	404	+32 Laps
36	GTD	96	(United States) Turner Motorsport	(United States) Robby Foley (United States) Patrick Gallagher (United States) Jake Walker	BMW P58 3.0 L Twin Turbo I6	404	+32 Laps
37	GTD	13	(Canada) AWA	(United Kingdom) Matt Bell (Canada) Orey Fidani (Germany) Lars Kern	Chevrolet Corvette Z06 GT3.R	404	+32 Laps
37	GTD	13	(Canada) AWA	(United Kingdom) Matt Bell (Canada) Orey Fidani (Germany) Lars Kern	Chevrolet LT6 5.5 L V8	404	+32 Laps
38	GTD Pro	81	(United States) DragonSpeed	(Spain) Albert Costa (Italy) Giacomo Altoè (Italy) Davide Rigon	Ferrari 296 GT3	404	+32 Laps
38	GTD Pro	81	(United States) DragonSpeed	(Spain) Albert Costa (Italy) Giacomo Altoè (Italy) Davide Rigon	Ferrari F163CE 3.0 L Turbo V6	404	+32 Laps
39	GTD Pro	77	(United States) AO Racing	(Austria) Klaus Bachler (Germany) Laurin Heinrich (Denmark) Michael Christensen	Porsche 911 GT3 R (992)	404	+32 Laps
39	GTD Pro	77	(United States) AO Racing	(Austria) Klaus Bachler (Germany) Laurin Heinrich (Denmark) Michael Christensen	Porsche M97/80 4.2 L Flat-6	404	+32 Laps
40	GTD	47	(Italy) Cetilar Racing	(Italy) Lorenzo Patrese (Italy) Roberto Lacorte (Spain) Miguel Molina	Ferrari 296 GT3	403	+33 Laps
40	GTD	47	(Italy) Cetilar Racing	(Italy) Lorenzo Patrese (Italy) Roberto Lacorte (Spain) Miguel Molina	Ferrari F163CE 3.0 L Turbo V6	403	+33 Laps
41	GTD	19	(United States) van der Steur Racing	(France) Valentin Hasse-Clot (United States) Anthony McIntosh (United States) Rory van der Steur	Aston Martin Vantage AMR GT3 Evo	403	+33 Laps
41	GTD	19	(United States) van der Steur Racing	(France) Valentin Hasse-Clot (United States) Anthony McIntosh (United States) Rory van der Steur	Aston Martin M177 4.0 L Turbo V8	403	+33 Laps
42	GTD Pro	1	(United States) Paul Miller Racing	(United States) Madison Snow (United States) Neil Verhagen (United States) Connor De Phillippi	BMW M4 GT3 Evo	401	+35 Laps
42	GTD Pro	1	(United States) Paul Miller Racing	(United States) Madison Snow (United States) Neil Verhagen (United States) Connor De Phillippi	BMW P58 3.0 L Twin Turbo I6	401	+35 Laps
43 DNF	LMP2	22	(United States) United Autosports USA	(United States) Dan Goldburg (United Kingdom) Paul di Resta (Sweden) Rasmus Lindh	Oreca 07	400	Did Not Finish
43 DNF	LMP2	22	(United States) United Autosports USA	(United States) Dan Goldburg (United Kingdom) Paul di Resta (Sweden) Rasmus Lindh	Gibson GK428 4.2 L V8	400	Did Not Finish
44	GTD	45	(United States) Wayne Taylor Racing	(Costa Rica) Danny Formal (United States) Trent Hindman (United States) Graham Doyle	Lamborghini Huracán GT3 Evo 2	355	+81 Laps
44	GTD	45	(United States) Wayne Taylor Racing	(Costa Rica) Danny Formal (United States) Trent Hindman (United States) Graham Doyle	Lamborghini DGF 5.2 L V10	355	+81 Laps
45 DNF	GTD Pro	9	(Canada) Pfaff Motorsports	(Italy) Andrea Caldarelli (Italy) Marco Mapelli (Canada) James Hinchcliffe	Lamborghini Huracán GT3 Evo 2	343	Did Not Finish
45 DNF	GTD Pro	9	(Canada) Pfaff Motorsports	(Italy) Andrea Caldarelli (Italy) Marco Mapelli (Canada) James Hinchcliffe	Lamborghini DGF 5.2 L V10	343	Did Not Finish
46 DNF	GTD	78	(United States) Forte Racing	(Germany) Mario Farnbacher (Canada) Misha Goikhberg (United States) Eric Filgueiras	Lamborghini Huracán GT3 Evo 2	280	Did Not Finish
46 DNF	GTD	78	(United States) Forte Racing	(Germany) Mario Farnbacher (Canada) Misha Goikhberg (United States) Eric Filgueiras	Lamborghini DGF 5.2 L V10	280	Did Not Finish
47 DNF	LMP2	8	(Canada) Tower Motorsports	(Canada) John Farano (France) Sébastien Bourdais (Mexico) Sebastián Álvarez	Oreca 07	106	Did Not Finish
47 DNF	LMP2	8	(Canada) Tower Motorsports	(Canada) John Farano (France) Sébastien Bourdais (Mexico) Sebastián Álvarez	Gibson GK428 4.2 L V8	106	Did Not Finish
48 DNF	GTD	021	(United States) Triarsi Competizione	(United States) AJ Muss (Italy) Riccardo Agostini (United States) Robert Megennis	Ferrari 296 GT3	103	Did Not Finish
48 DNF	GTD	021	(United States) Triarsi Competizione	(United States) AJ Muss (Italy) Riccardo Agostini (United States) Robert Megennis	Ferrari F163CE 3.0 L Turbo V6	103	Did Not Finish
49 DNF	GTD	80	(United States) Lone Star Racing	(Australia) Scott Andrews (United States) Wyatt Brichacek (Netherlands) Lin Hodenius	Mercedes-AMG GT3 Evo	89	Did Not Finish
49 DNF	GTD	80	(United States) Lone Star Racing	(Australia) Scott Andrews (United States) Wyatt Brichacek (Netherlands) Lin Hodenius	Mercedes-AMG M159 6.2 L V8	89	Did Not Finish
50 DNF	GTD	34	(United States) Conquest Racing	(United States) Manny Franco (Brazil) Daniel Serra (United States) Mike Skeen	Ferrari 296 GT3	0	Collision
50 DNF	GTD	34	(United States) Conquest Racing	(United States) Manny Franco (Brazil) Daniel Serra (United States) Mike Skeen	Ferrari F163CE 3.0 L Turbo V6	0	Collision
51 DNF	GTD	66	(United States) Gradient Racing	(United Kingdom) Till Bechtolsheimer (United States) Joey Hand (United States) Mason Filippi	Ford Mustang GT3	0	Collision
51 DNF	GTD	66	(United States) Gradient Racing	(United Kingdom) Till Bechtolsheimer (United States) Joey Hand (United States) Mason Filippi	Ford Coyote 5.4 L V8	0	Collision
52 DNF	GTD	70	(United Kingdom) Inception Racing	(United States) Brendan Iribe (Denmark) Frederik Schandorff (United Kingdom) Ollie Millroy	Ferrari 296 GT3	0	Collision
52 DNF	GTD	70	(United Kingdom) Inception Racing	(United States) Brendan Iribe (Denmark) Frederik Schandorff (United Kingdom) Ollie Millroy	Ferrari F163CE 3.0 L Turbo V6	0	Collision
53 DNF	GTD	44	(United States) Magnus Racing	(United States) John Potter (United States) Spencer Pumpelly (Belgium) Jan Heylen	Aston Martin Vantage AMR GT3 Evo	0	Collision
53 DNF	GTD	44	(United States) Magnus Racing	(United States) John Potter (United States) Spencer Pumpelly (Belgium) Jan Heylen	Aston Martin M177 4.0 L Turbo V8	0	Collision

== Standings after the race ==
GTP Drivers' Championship standings
Pos.	+/–	Driver	Points
1		(France) Mathieu Jaminet (Australia) Matt Campbell	2907
2	4	(United Kingdom) Jack Aitken	2720
3	1	(Brazil) Felipe Nasr (United Kingdom) Nick Tandy	2689
4	1	(Austria) Philipp Eng (Belgium) Dries Vanthoor	2679
5	1	(United Kingdom) Nick Yelloly (Netherlands) Renger van der Zande	2657

LMP2 Drivers' Championship standings
Pos.	+/–	Driver	Points
1		(United States) Dane Cameron (United States) P. J. Hyett	2254
2	2	(United States) Steven Thomas	2154
3	1	(United States) Dan Goldburg	2117
4	1	(Brazil) Felipe Fraga (United States) Gar Robinson	2047
5	2	(United States) Jeremy Clarke	1908

GTD Pro Drivers' Championship standings
Pos.	+/–	Driver	Points
1		(Spain) Antonio García (United Kingdom) Alexander Sims	3265
2		(Spain) Albert Costa	3192
3		(United Kingdom) Sebastian Priaulx (Germany) Mike Rockenfeller	3077
4	1	(United Kingdom) Dan Harper (Germany) Max Hesse	2984
5	1	(Austria) Klaus Bachler (Germany) Laurin Heinrich	2963

GTD Drivers' Championship standings
Pos.	+/–	Driver	Points
1		(Switzerland) Philip Ellis (United States) Russell Ward	3103
2	1	(United States) Kenton Koch	2908
3	1	(United Kingdom) Casper Stevenson	2898
4		(United Kingdom) Jack Hawksworth (Canada) Parker Thompson	2851
5		(United States) Robby Foley (United States) Patrick Gallagher	2739

Note: Only the top five positions are included for all sets of standings.

GTP Teams' Championship standings
Pos.	+/–	Team	Points
1		(Germany) #6 Porsche Penske Motorsport	2907
2	4	(United States) #31 Cadillac Whelen	2720
3	1	(Germany) #7 Porsche Penske Motorsport	2689
4	1	(United States) #24 BMW M Team RLL	2679
5	1	(United States) #93 Acura Meyer Shank Racing w/ Curb-Agajanian	2657

LMP2 Teams' Championship standings
Pos.	+/–	Team	Points
1		(United States) #99 AO Racing	2254
2	2	(France) #11 TDS Racing	2154
3	2	(Poland) #43 Inter Europol Competition	2139
4	2	(United States) #22 United Autosports USA	2117
5	2	(United States) #74 Riley	2047

GTD Pro Teams' Championship standings
Pos.	+/–	Team	Points
1		(United States) #3 Corvette Racing by Pratt Miller Motorsports	3265
2		(United States) #81 DragonSpeed	3192
3		(Canada) #64 Ford Multimatic Motorsports	3077
4	1	(United States) #48 Paul Miller Racing	2984
5	1	(United States) #77 AO Racing	2963

GTD Teams' Championship standings
Pos.	+/–	Team	Points
1		(United States) #57 Winward Racing	3103
2		(United States) #27 Heart of Racing Team	2898
3		(United States) #12 Vasser Sullivan Racing	2851
4		(United States) #96 Turner Motorsport	2739
5		(United States) #120 Wright Motorsports	2727

Note: Only the top five positions are included for all sets of standings.

GTP Manufacturers' Championship standings
Pos.	+/–	Manufacturer	Points
1		(Germany) Porsche	3134
2		(Japan) Acura	3092
3		(United States) Cadillac	3069
4		(Germany) BMW	2947
5		(United Kingdom) Aston Martin	2348

GTD Pro Manufacturers' Championship standings
Pos.	+/–	Manufacturer	Points
1		(United States) Chevrolet	3370
2	2	(Germany) BMW	3325
3		(United States) Ford	3283
4	2	(Italy) Ferrari	3262
5		(Germany) Porsche	3085

GTD Manufacturers' Championship standings
Pos.	+/–	Manufacturer	Points
1		(Germany) Mercedes-AMG	3363
2		(Italy) Ferrari	3324
3		(United Kingdom) Aston Martin	3066
4	1	(Japan) Lexus	3055
5	1	(Germany) Porsche	3013

Note: Only the top five positions are included for all sets of standings.
