= Klaus Bachler =

Austrian racing driver

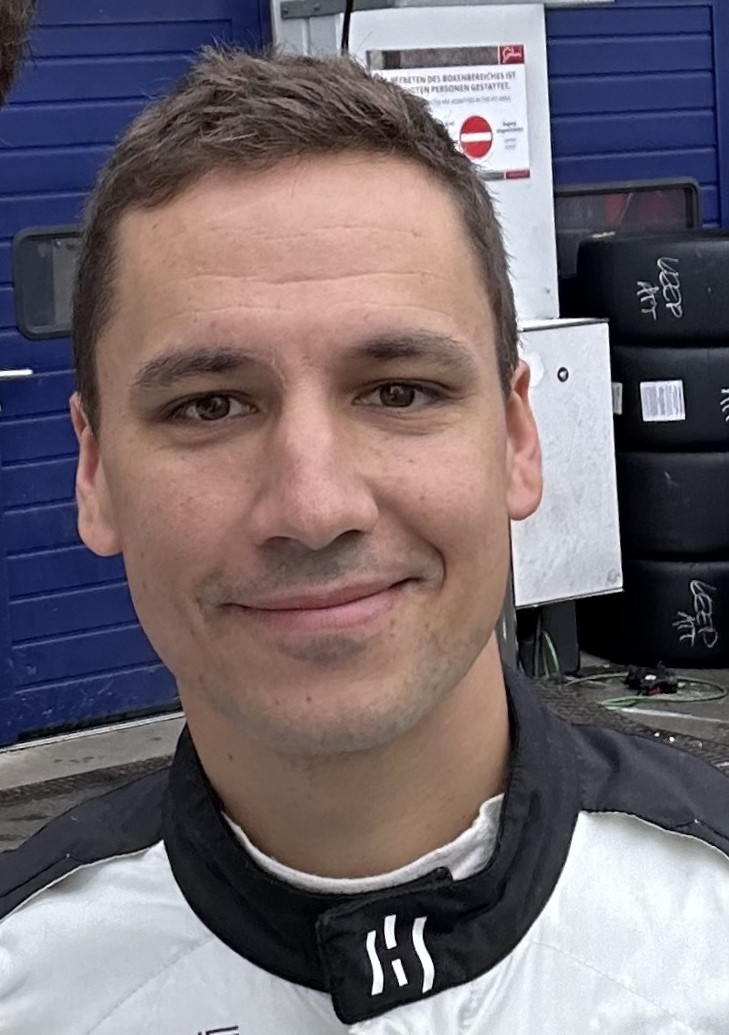
- Bachler in 2024
- Nationality: (Austria) Austrian
- Born: 27 July 1991 (age 35) Unzmarkt, Austria
- Categorisation: FIA Silver (until 2013); FIA Gold (2014–2022); FIA Platinum (2023–)

Championship titles
- 2025 2024 2023–24, 2024–25 2007: 24H Series - GT3; WEC - LMGT3; AsLMS - GT; Formula Lista Junior

Klaus Bachler (born 27 July 1991) is an Austrian racing driver. As a Porsche-contracted driver, Bachler has won races in multiple high-level categories, including the Porsche Supercup, ADAC GT Masters, GTWC Europe Endurance Cup, IMSA SportsCar Championship, and FIA World Endurance Championship.

Bachler's accolades include the 2007 title in the Formula Lista Junior series, as well as winning the 2023–24 Asian Le Mans Series with Pure Rxcing, the team he currently drives for in the WEC.

== Career ==
Bachler began his car racing career in the Lista Junior championship, where he took five wins as well as the 2007 title for Neuhauser Racing. He moved up to the ADAC Formel Masters, finishing third in 2008 and second in 2009. After making his German F3 debut at the end of 2010, Bachler went into the series full-time in 2011, where two victories helped him towards third place in the standings.

After winning the 2011 Porsche junior driver shootout, Bachler switched to sportscar racing in 2012, driving a full season in the Porsche Carrera Cup Germany, as well as making his debut in the Porsche Supercup. He would enter the Supercup for the next two years, winning a race at Spa in 2013. Following a race win with Proton Competition in the ELMS in 2013, Bachler entered the FIA WEC in 2014, where he helped the team to third in the standings, in addition to finishing second in class at the 24 Hours of Le Mans.

From 2015 on, Bachler drove in the ADAC GT Masters, where he took two wins over eight years in the series. He also began driving in the GT World Challenge Europe Endurance Cup starting in 2019, when he won the season-opening race with Dinamic Motorsport. He returned to the Italian team in 2021 after a season with Rowe Racing and repeated that feat, before scoring a podium at the final round to finish sixth overall. Two further podiums, including a win at Barcelona, came in 2022, which led to a record-high fourth in the standings for Bachler.

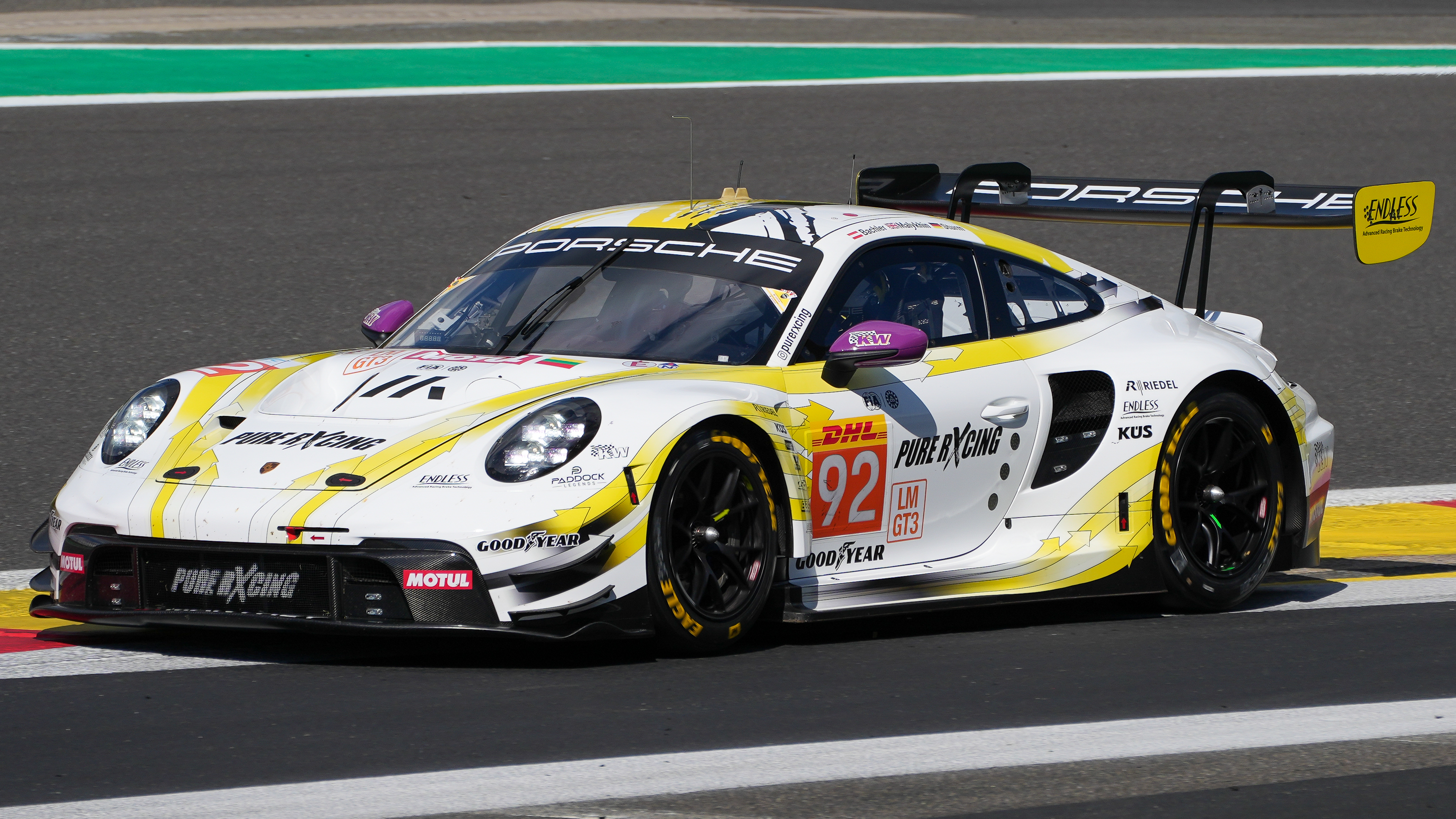
Bachler driving his Manthey PureRxcing Porsche 911 GT3 R (992) at Spa-Francorchamps in 2024.

As a Porsche-contracted driver, Bachler entered the GTD Pro class of the IMSA SportsCar Championship in 2023, partnering Patrick Pilet at Pfaff Motorsports. The pair won at the 12 Hours of Sebring and scored six further podiums on their way to fourth in the standings. During the same year, Bachler entered the Bronze Cup category of the GTWC Endurance Cup alongside Joel Sturm and bronze-ranked Alex Malykhin, where they won at the season-opener and finished second in class at the 24 Hours of Spa, leaving them fifth in the standings. The trio remained together for the Asian Le Mans Series and won the 2024 title thanks to two race victories.

For PureRxcing's main season, Bachler and his teammates would drive in the WEC's new LMGT3 class, as well as racing as a Pro-classed lineup in the GTWC Endurance Cup. At the first WEC race in Qatar, the PureRxcing trio took victory.

== Racing record ==
=== Racing career summary ===
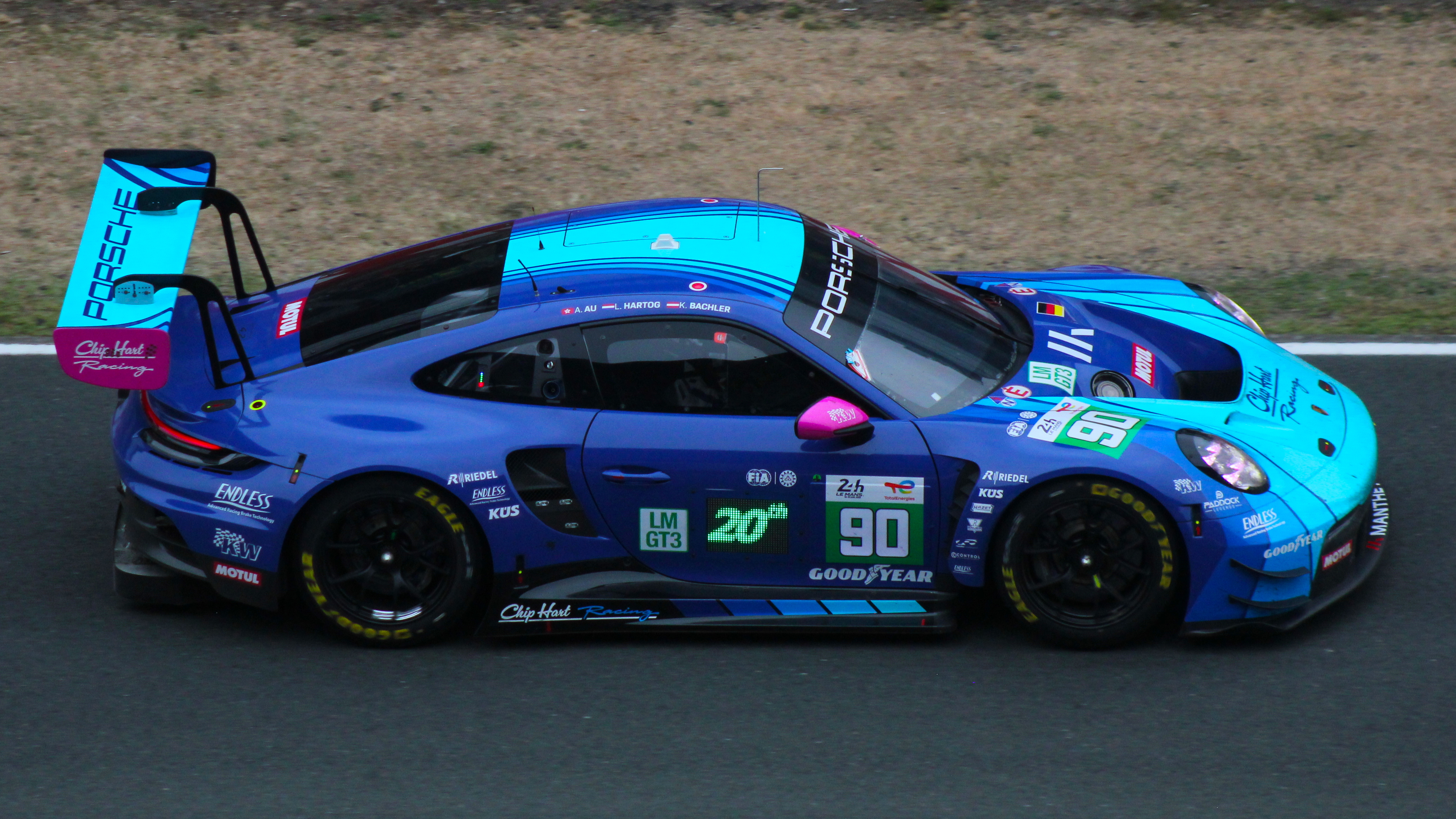
Bachler's No. 90 car at the 2025 24 Hours of Le Mans

| Season | Series | Team | Races | Wins | Poles | F/Laps | Podiums | Points | Position |
|---|---|---|---|---|---|---|---|---|---|
| 2006 | Formel A - Lista Junior Meisterschaft | Neuhauser Racing | 2 | 0 | 0 | 0 | 0 | 16 | 14th |
| 2007 | LO Formel Lista Junior | Neuhauser Racing | 12 | 5 | 10 | 6 | 9 | 190 | **1st** |
| 2008 | ADAC Formel Masters | Neuhauser Racing | 16 | 2 | 1 | 3 | 6 | 141 | **3rd** |
| 2009 | ADAC Formel Masters | URD Rennsport | 16 | 3 | 2 | 4 | 10 | 188 | **2nd** |
| 2010 | German Formula 3 Championship | URD Rennsport | 2 | 0 | 0 | 0 | 0 | 8 | 15th |
| 2011 | German Formula 3 Championship | URD Rennsport | 18 | 2 | 0 | 1 | 7 | 79 | **3rd** |
| 2012 | Porsche Carrera Cup Germany | Team Deutsche Post by tolimit | 17 | 0 | 0 | 0 | 1 | 122 | 8th |
| 2012 | Porsche Supercup | Team Deutsche Post by tolimit | 2 | 0 | 0 | 0 | 0 | 0 | NC† |
| 2013 | Porsche Supercup | FÖRCH Racing by Lukas MS | 9 | 1 | 0 | 0 | 1 | 73 | 7th |
| 2013 | European Le Mans Series - LMGTE | Proton Competition | 3 | 1 | 0 | 0 | 2 | 48 | 7th |
| 2013 | Grand Am Series - GT | Snow Racing/Wright Motorsports | 1 | 0 | 0 | 0 | 0 | 20 | 58th |
| 2013 | 24 Hours of Nürburgring - SP9 | Pinta Team Manthey | 1 | 0 | 0 | 0 | 0 | N/A | DNF |
| 2013 | French GT Championship | Autorlano | 2 | 0 | 0 | 0 | 0 | 0 | NC |
| 2014 | Porsche Supercup | Konrad Motorsport | 10 | 0 | 0 | 2 | 3 | 112 | 5th |
| 2014 | FIA World Endurance Championship - LMGTE Am | Proton Competition | 7 | 0 | 0 | 0 | 2 | 111 | 5th |
| 2014 | 24 Hours of Le Mans - LMGTE Am | Proton Competition | 1 | 0 | 0 | 0 | 1 | N/A | **2nd** |
| 2014 | Porsche Carrera Cup Germany | Team 75 Bernhard | 4 | 0 | 0 | 0 | 0 | 21 | 22nd |
| 2014 | IMSA SportsCar Championship - GTD | Dempsey Racing | 1 | 0 | 0 | 0 | 0 | 13 | 106th |
| 2015 | ADAC GT Masters | GW IT Racing Team Schütz Motorsport | 16 | 1 | 3 | 1 | 5 | 150 | 4th |
| 2015 | FIA World Endurance Championship - LMGTE Am | Abu Dhabi-Proton Racing | 5 | 0 | 0 | 0 | 1 | 46 | 11th |
| 2015 | 24 Hours of Le Mans - LMGTE Am | Abu Dhabi-Proton Racing | 1 | 0 | 0 | 0 | 0 | N/A | DNF |
| 2015 | European Le Mans Series - LMGTE | Proton Competition | 1 | 0 | 0 | 0 | 0 | 10 | 15th |
| 2015 | Porsche Carrera Cup Germany - Class A | Konrad Motorsport | 1 | 0 | 0 | 0 | 0 | 2 | 27th |
| 2015 | IMSA SportsCar Championship - GTD | Konrad Motorsport | 1 | 0 | 0 | 0 | 0 | 1 | 61st |
| 2015 | 24H Dubai - 997 | Lechner Racing Middle East | 1 | 0 | 0 | 1 | 1 | N/A | **3rd** |
| 2015 | 24H Series - 997 | MSG Motorsport 1 | 1 | 1 | 0 | 0 | 1 | 0 | NC† |
| 2016 | GT3 Le Mans Cup | Mentos Racing | 5 | 0 | 0 | 1 | 4 | 68 | 4th |
| 2016 | ADAC GT Masters | KÜS Team75 Bernhard | 4 | 0 | 0 | 0 | 0 | 8 | 42nd |
| 2016 | Porsche Supercup | race:pro motorsport | 3 | 0 | 0 | 0 | 1 | 0 | NC† |
| 2016 | European Le Mans Series - LMGTE | Proton Competition | 1 | 0 | 0 | 0 | 0 | 12 | 17th |
| 2016 | FIA World Endurance Championship - LMGTE Am | Abu Dhabi-Proton Racing | 1 | 0 | 1 | 1 | 0 | 11 | 16th |
| 2016 | 24H Series - 991 | Black Falcon Team TMD Friction | 1 | 0 | 1 | 0 | 0 | 0 | NC† |
| 2017 | ADAC GT Masters | Schütz Motorsport | 13 | 0 | 0 | 0 | 1 | 28 | 22nd |
| 2017 | VLN Series - SP9 | Falken Motorsports | 6 | 0 | 1 | 0 | 3 | 0 | NC† |
| 2017 | GT Series Sprint Cup | Attempto Racing | 2 | 0 | 0 | 0 | 0 | 1 | 31st |
| 2017 | 24H Nürburgring - Qualifying Race - SP9 | Frikadelli Racing Team | 1 | 0 | 0 | 0 | 0 | N/A | 9th |
| 2017 | 24 Hours of Nürburgring - SP9 | Frikadelli Racing Team | 1 | 0 | 0 | 0 | 0 | N/A | 6th |
| 2017 | 24 Hours of Le Mans - LMGTE Am | Proton Competition | 1 | 0 | 0 | 0 | 0 | N/A | DNF |
| 2017 | 24H Series - Porsche 991 Cup | race:pro motorsport | 1 | 0 | 0 | 0 | 1 | 0 | NC† |
| 2018 | ADAC GT Masters | KÜS Team75 Bernhard | 14 | 0 | 1 | 1 | 1 | 23 | 23rd |
| 2018 | VLN Series - SP9 | Falken Motorsports | 5 | 2 | 1 | 1 | 4 | 17.56 | 5th |
| 2018 | 24 Hours of Nürburgring - SP9 | Falken Motorsports | 1 | 0 | 0 | 0 | 0 | N/A | 8th |
| 2018 | V de V Endurance Series - LMP3 | Wimmer Werk Motorsport | 5 | 1 | 0 | 1 | 3 | 114 | 11th |
| 2018 | 24H Series - Continents - Porsche 991 Cup | Race:pro Motorsport | 1 | 0 | 1 | 1 | 0 | 0 | NC† |
| 2018 | Gulf 12 Hours - GT3 | Attempto Racing | 1 | 0 | 0 | 0 | 0 | N/A | DNF |
| 2019 | ADAC GT Masters | KÜS Team75 Bernhard | 14 | 1 | 0 | 0 | 3 | 103 | 9th |
| 2019 | Blancpain GT Series Endurance Cup | Dinamic Motorsport | 4 | 1 | 0 | 0 | 1 | 31 | 8th |
| 2019 | Intercontinental GT Challenge | Dinamic Motorsport | 1 | 0 | 0 | 0 | 0 | 0 | NC |
| 2019 | VLN Series - SP9 | Falken Motorsports | 4 | 0 | 0 | 0 | 0 | 23.72 | 11th |
| 2019 | 24 Hours of Nürburgring - SP9 | Falken Motorsports | 1 | 0 | 0 | 0 | 0 | N/A | 15th |
| 2019 | 24H Series - Continents | Attempto Racing | 1 | 0 | 0 | 0 | 0 | 0 | NC† |
| 2019 | 24H Series - Continents | Herberth Motorsport | 2 | 0 | 1 | 1 | 0 | 0 | NC† |
| 2019 | IMSA SportsCar Championship - GTD | NGT Motorsport | 1 | 0 | 0 | 0 | 0 | 10 | 68th |
| 2020 | ADAC GT Masters | KÜS Team75 Bernhard | 11 | 0 | 0 | 0 | 0 | 77 | 11th |
| 2020 | ADAC GT Masters | Precote Herberth Motorsport | 2 | 0 | 0 | 0 | 2 | 77 | 11th |
| 2020 | GT World Challenge Europe Endurance Cup | Rowe Racing | 2 | 0 | 0 | 0 | 0 | 8 | 18th |
| 2020 | Intercontinental GT Challenge | Rowe Racing | 1 | 0 | 0 | 0 | 0 | 0 | NC |
| 2020 | Nürburgring Langstrecken-Serie - SP9 | Falken Motorsports | 1 | 0 | 0 | 0 | 0 | 0 | NC |
| 2020 | 24 Hours of Nürburgring - SP9 | Falken Motorsports | 1 | 0 | 0 | 0 | 0 | N/A | 10th |
| 2020 | IMSA SportsCar Championship - GTD | Wright Motorsports | 1 | 0 | 0 | 0 | 0 | 28 | 43rd |
| 2020 | 24H GT Series - Europe | Herberth Motorsport | 2 | 1 | 0 | 2 | 2 | 0 | NC† |
| 2021 | Asian Le Mans Series - GT | Precote Herberth Motorsport | 4 | 0 | 0 | 1 | 0 | 4.5 | 14th |
| 2021 | ADAC GT Masters | Precote Herberth Motorsport | 13 | 0 | 1 | 0 | 0 | 34 | 23rd |
| 2021 | GT World Challenge Europe Endurance Cup | Dinamic Motorsport | 5 | 1 | 0 | 0 | 2 | 53 | 6th |
| 2021 | Intercontinental GT Challenge | Dinamic Motorsport | 1 | 0 | 0 | 0 | 0 | 0 | NC |
| 2021 | GT World Challenge Europe Sprint Cup | Allied-Racing | 6 | 0 | 0 | 0 | 0 | 0 | NC |
| 2021 | Nürburgring Langstrecken-Serie - SP9 Pro-Am | Falken Motorsports | 1 | 0 | 0 | 0 | 1 | 0 | NC† |
| 2021 | 24 Hours of Nürburgring - SP9 | Falken Motorsports | 1 | 0 | 0 | 0 | 0 | N/A | 4th |
| 2021 | IMSA SportsCar Championship - GTD | Wright Motorsports | 1 | 0 | 0 | 0 | 0 | 303 | 46th |
| 2021 | 24H Series - GT3 | Herberth Motorsport | 1 | 0 | 0 | 0 | 0 | 0 | NC† |
| 2022 | Asian Le Mans Series - GT | Herberth Motorsport | 4 | 0 | 1 | 1 | 1 | 20 | 8th |
| 2022 | GT World Challenge Europe Endurance Cup | Dinamic Motorsport | 5 | 1 | 0 | 0 | 2 | 54 | 4th |
| 2022 | GT World Challenge Europe Sprint Cup | Dinamic Motorsport | 10 | 0 | 0 | 0 | 0 | 0 | NC |
| 2022 | Intercontinental GT Challenge | GMG Racing | 1 | 0 | 0 | 0 | 0 | 6 | 19th |
| 2022 | Intercontinental GT Challenge | Herberth Motorsport | 1 | 0 | 0 | 0 | 0 | 6 | 19th |
| 2022 | ADAC GT Masters | ID-Racing with Herberth | 2 | 0 | 0 | 0 | 0 | 13 | 32nd |
| 2022 | ADAC GT Masters | Dinamic Motorsport | 2 | 0 | 0 | 1 | 0 | 13 | 32nd |
| 2022 | International GT Open | Dinamic Motorsport | 4 | 1 | 1 | 2 | 3 | 46 | 5th |
| 2022 | IMSA SportsCar Championship - GTD | GMG Racing | 2 | 0 | 0 | 0 | 0 | 106 | 71st |
| 2022 | 24H Series - GT3 | Dinamic Motorsport | 1 | 0 | 0 | 0 | 0 | 0 | NC† |
| 2022 | 24 Hours of Nürburgring - SP9 | Falken Motorsports | 1 | 0 | 0 | 0 | 0 | N/A | DNF |
| 2023 | Asian Le Mans Series - GT | Herberth Motorsport | 4 | 0 | 0 | 0 | 0 | 4 | 16th |
| 2023 | IMSA SportsCar Championship - GTD Pro | Pfaff Motorsports | 11 | 1 | 2 | 0 | 7 | 3578 | 4th |
| 2023 | GT World Challenge Europe Endurance Cup - Bronze | Pure Rxcing | 5 | 1 | 1 | 0 | 2 | 69 | 5th |
| 2023 | Nürburgring Langstrecken-Serie - SP9 | Falken Motorsports | 2 | 0 | 0 | 0 | 1 | 0 | NC† |
| 2023 | 24 Hours of Nürburgring - SP9 | Falken Motorsports | 1 | 0 | 0 | 0 | 0 | N/A | DNF |
| 2023 | GT World Challenge Asia - Pro-Am | Absolute Racing | 4 | 1 | 0 | 0 | 1 | 35 | 18th |
| 2023 | GT World Challenge America - Pro | RennSport1 - CBW Racing | 1 | 0 | 0 | 0 | 1 | 0 | NC† |
| 2023–24 | Asian Le Mans Series - GT | Pure Rxcing | 5 | 2 | 0 | 0 | 3 | 76 | **1st** |
| 2024 | FIA World Endurance Championship - LMGT3 | Manthey PureRxcing | 8 | 2 | 2 | 0 | 6 | 139 | **1st** |
| 2024 | GT World Challenge Europe Endurance Cup | Pure Rxcing | 5 | 0 | 0 | 0 | 0 | 12 | 19th |
| 2024 | IMSA SportsCar Championship - GTD | MDK Motorsports | 4 | 0 | 0 | 0 | 0 | 842 | 42th |
| 2024 | IMSA SportsCar Championship - GTD Pro | AO Racing | 1 | 0 | 0 | 0 | 0 | 263 | 38th |
| 2024 | Nürburgring Langstrecken-Serie - SP9 | Falken Motorsports | 3 | 1 | 1 | 0 | 1 | 0 | NC† |
| 2024 | 24 Hours of Nürburgring - SP9 | Falken Motorsports | 1 | 0 | 0 | 0 | 0 | N/A | 6th |
| 2024–25 | Asian Le Mans Series - GT | Manthey Racing | 6 | 1 | 0 | 0 | 3 | 86 | **1st** |
| 2025 | Middle East Trophy - GT3 | Dinamic GT | 1 | 0 | 0 | 0 | 1 | 0 | NC† |
| 2025 | IMSA SportsCar Championship - GTD Pro | AO Racing | 10 | 2 | 0 | 1 | 3 | 2963 | 5th |
| 2025 | 24H Series - GT3 | Proton Huber Competition | 5 | 1 | 1 | 1 | 2 | 142 | **1st** |
| 2025 | GT World Challenge Europe Endurance Cup | Schumacher CLRT | 3 | 0 | 0 | 0 | 1 | 31 | 11th |
| 2025 | Intercontinental GT Challenge | Schumacher CLRT | 1 | 0 | 0 | 0 | 0 | 6 | 28th |
| 2025 | Intercontinental GT Challenge | Phantom Global Racing | 1 | 0 | 0 | 0 | 0 | 6 | 28th |
| 2025 | Intercontinental GT Challenge | GMG Racing | 1 | 0 | 0 | 0 | 0 | 6 | 28th |
| 2025 | GT World Challenge Europe Sprint Cup | Razoon - more than racing | 2 | 0 | 0 | 0 | 0 | 0 | NC |
| 2025 | 24 Hours of Le Mans - LMGT3 | Manthey Racing | 1 | 0 | 0 | 0 | 0 | N/A | 6th |
| 2025 | Nürburgring Langstrecken-Serie - SP9 | Falken Motorsports | 1 | 1 | 0 | 0 | 1 | 0 | NC |
| 2025–26 | Asian Le Mans Series - GT | Manthey Racing | 6 | 0 | 0 | 1 | 4 | 55 | 7th |
| 2026 | IMSA SportsCar Championship - GTD Pro | Manthey Racing | 5 | 1 | 0 | 1 | 1 | 1379 | 10th |
| 2026 | Nürburgring Langstrecken-Serie - SP9 | Falken Motorsports | 2 | 0 | 0 | 0 | 0 | 0 | NC |
| 2026 | 24 Hours of Nürburgring - SP9 | Falken Motorsports | 1 | 0 | 0 | 0 | 0 | N/A | DNF |
| 2026 | Intercontinental GT Challenge | Falken Motorsports | 1 | 0 | 0 | 0 | 0 | 6 | 27th |
| 2026 | Intercontinental GT Challenge | EBM | 1 | 0 | 0 | 0 | 0 | 6 | 27th |
| 2026 | 24H Series - GT3 | Herberth Motorsport | 1 | 0 | 0 | 0 | 0 | 4 | 41st |
| 2026 | GT World Challenge Asia | Absolute Racing | 4 | 0 | 0 | 0 | 0 | 6 | 36th |
| 2026 | European Le Mans Series - LMGT3 | High Class Racing | 4 | 0 | 0 | 0 | 1 | 31 | 13th |
| 2026 | GT World Challenge Europe Endurance Cup | High Class Racing | 1 | 0 | 0 | 0 | 0 | 0 | NC† |
| 2026 | GT World Challenge Europe Sprint Cup | Razoon - more than racing | 2 | 0 | 0 | 0 | 0 | 0 | NC† |
| 2026–27 | Asian Le Mans Series - GT3 | Manthey Racing | | | | | | | |

^{*} Season still in progress.^{†} As Bachler was a guest driver, he was ineligible for points.

=== Complete ADAC Formel Masters results ===
(key) (Races in bold indicate pole position) (Races in italics indicate fastest lap)

| Year | Team | 1 | 2 | 3 | 4 | 5 | 6 | 7 | 8 | 9 | 10 | 11 | 12 | 13 | 14 | 15 | 16 | Pos | Points |
|---|---|---|---|---|---|---|---|---|---|---|---|---|---|---|---|---|---|---|---|
| 2008 | Neuhauser Racing | **OSC1**; **1**; 4 | OSC1; 2; 2 | NÜR1; 1; 3 | NÜR1; 2 Ret | ASS; 1; 1 | ASS; 2; 5 | NÜR2; 1; 6 | NÜR2; 2; 11 | LAU; 1 Ret | LAU; 2; 5 | SAC; 1; 6 | SAC; 2; 3 | OSC2; 1; 8 | OSC2; 2; 6 | HOC; 1; 3 | HOC; 2; 1 | 3rd | 141 |
| 2009 | URD Rennsport | OSC1; 1; 4 | OSC1; 2; 1 | ASS; 1; 2 | ASS; 2; 3 | NÜR1; 1 Ret | NÜR1; 2; 6 | HOC; 1; 1 | **HOC**; **2**; 2 | LAU; 1; 1 | LAU; 2; 14 | NÜR2; 1; 3 | NÜR2; 2; 3 | SAC; 1; 4 | SAC; 2; 2 | OSC2; 1; 11 | **OSC2**; **2**; 2 | 2nd | 188 |

=== Complete German Formula Three Championship results ===
(key) (Races in bold indicate pole position) (Races in italics indicate fastest lap)

| Year | Entrant | 1 | 2 | 3 | 4 | 5 | 6 | 7 | 8 | 9 | 10 | 11 | 12 | 13 | 14 | 15 | 16 | 17 | 18 | DC | Points |
|---|---|---|---|---|---|---|---|---|---|---|---|---|---|---|---|---|---|---|---|---|---|
| 2010 | URD Rennsport | OSC1; 1 | OSC1; 2 | SAC; 1 | SAC; 2 | HOC; 1 | HOC; 2 | ASS1; 1 | ASS1; 2 | NÜR1; 1 | NÜR1; 2 | ASS2; 1 | ASS2; 2 | LAU; 1 | LAU; 2 | NÜR2; 1 | NÜR2; 2 | OSC2; 1; 5 | OSC2; 2; 5 | 15th | 8 |
| 2011 | URD Rennsport | OSC; 1 Ret | OSC; 2; 13 | SPA; 1; 4 | SPA; 2; 3 | SAC; 1; 3 | SAC; 2; 1 | ASS1; 1; 3 | ASS1; 2; 3 | ZOL; 1; 2 | ZOL; 2; 7 | RBR; 1; 6 | RBR; 2; 13 | LAU; 1; 4 | LAU; 2; 4 | ASS2; 1; 1 | ASS2; 2; 4 | HOC; 1; 9 | HOC; 2 Ret | 3rd | 79 |

=== Complete Porsche Carrera Cup Germany results ===
(key) (Races in bold indicate pole position) (Races in italics indicate fastest lap)

| Year | Team | 1 | 2 | 3 | 4 | 5 | 6 | 7 | 8 | 9 | 10 | 11 | 12 | 13 | 14 | 15 | 16 | 17 | 18 | Pos. | Pts |
|---|---|---|---|---|---|---|---|---|---|---|---|---|---|---|---|---|---|---|---|---|---|
| 2012 | Team Deutsche Post by Tolimit | HOC1; 1; 17 | HOC1; 2; 13 | LAU; 1; 18 | LAU; 2 Ret | NNS; 14 | RBR; 1; 3 | RBR; 2; 7 | NOR; 1 Ret | NOR; 2; 8 | NÜR; 1; 9 | NÜR; 2; 7 | ZAN; 1; 8‡ | ZAN; 2; 11 | OSC; 1; 8 | OSC; 2; 4 | HOC2; 1; 4 | HOC2; 2; 4 | | 8th | 122 |
| 2014 | Team 75 Bernhard | HOC1; 1 | HOC1; 2 | OSC; 1 | OSC; 2 | HUN; 1 | HUN; 1 | NOR; 1 | NOR; 2 | RBR; 1 | RBR; 2 | NÜR; 1 | NÜR; 2 | LAU; 1; 22 | LAU; 2 Ret | SAC; 1 | SAC; 2 | HOC2; 1; 5 | HOC2; 2; 7 | 22nd | 21 |
| 2015 | Konrad Motorsport | HOC1; 1 | HOC1; 2 | NNS; 14 | LAU; 1 | LAU; 2 | NOR; 1 | NOR; 2 | ZAN; 1 | ZAN; 2 | RBR; 1 | RBR; 2 | OSC; 1 | OSC; 2 | NÜR; 1 | NÜR; 2 | HOC2; 1 | HOC2; 2 | | 27th | 2 |

=== Complete Porsche Supercup results ===
(key) (Races in bold indicate pole position) (Races in italics indicate fastest lap)

| Year | Team | 1 | 2 | 3 | 4 | 5 | 6 | 7 | 8 | 9 | 10 | Pos. | Pts |
|---|---|---|---|---|---|---|---|---|---|---|---|---|---|
| 2012 | Team Deutsche Post by Tolimit | BHR | BHR | MON | VAL | SIL | HOC; 12 | HUN | HUN | SPA; 10 | MNZ | NC | 0‡ |
| 2013 | FÖRCH Racing by Lukas MS | CAT; 7 | MON; 10 | SIL; 21 | NÜR; 9 | HUN; 5 | SPA; 1 | MNZ; 7 | YMC; 7 | YMC; 21† | | 7th | 73 |
| 2014 | Konrad Motorsport | CAT; 12 | MON; 10 | RBR; 9 | SIL; 7 | HOC; 4 | HUN; 6 | SPA; 3 | MNZ; 2 | COA; 3 | COA; 5 | 4th | 112 |
| 2016 | race:pro motorsport | CAT | MON; 2 | RBR; 8 | SIL | HUN | HOC | SPA; 7 | MNZ | COA | COA | NC | 0‡ |

^{‡} Bachler was a guest driver, therefore he was ineligible for points.
^{†} Driver did not finish the race, but was classified as he completed over 90% of the race distance.

=== Complete European Le Mans Series results ===
(key) (Races in bold indicate pole position; results in italics indicate fastest lap)

| Year | Entrant | Class | Chassis | Engine | 1 | 2 | 3 | 4 | 5 | 6 | Rank | Points |
|---|---|---|---|---|---|---|---|---|---|---|---|---|
| 2013 | Proton Competition | LMGTE | Porsche 997 GT3-RSR | Porsche 4.0 L Flat-6 | SIL | IMO | RBR; 6 | HUN; 1 | LEC; 3 | | 7th | 48 |
| 2015 | Proton Competition | LMGTE | Porsche 911 RSR | Porsche 4.0 L Flat-6 | SIL; 5 | IMO | RBR | LEC | EST | | 31th | 10 |
| 2016 | Proton Competition | LMGTE | Porsche 911 RSR | Porsche 4.0 L Flat-6 | SIL | IMO; 4 | RBR | LEC | SPA | EST | 17th | 12 |
| 2026 | High Class Racing | LMGT3 | Porsche 911 GT3 R (992.2) | Porsche 4.2 L Flat-6 | CAT | LEC | IMO; 5 | SPA; 9 | SIL; 7 | ALG; 3 | 13th | 31 |

=== Complete 24 Hours of Nürburgring results ===
| Year | Team | Co-Drivers | Car | Class | Laps | Ovr. Pos. | Class Pos. |
|---|---|---|---|---|---|---|---|
| 2013 | (Germany) Pinta Team Manthey | (Denmark) Michael Christensen (Germany) Michael Illbruck (Germany) Robert Renauer | Porsche 911 GT3 R | SP9 | ? | DNF | DNF |
| 2017 | (Germany) Frikadelli Racing | (Denmark) Michael Christensen (Austria) Norbert Siedler (Germany) Lucas Luhr | Porsche 911 GT3 R | SP9 | 157 | 6th | 6th |
| 2018 | (Germany) Falken Motorsports | (Germany) Sven Müller (Austria) Martin Ragginger (Germany) Dirk Werner | Porsche 911 GT3 R | SP9 | 132 | 9th | 8th |
| 2019 | (Germany) Falken Motorsports | (Germany) Jörg Bergmeister (Austria) Martin Ragginger (Germany) Dirk Werner | Porsche 911 GT3 R | SP9 | 145 | 20th | 14th |
| 2020 | (Germany) Falken Motorsports | (United Kingdom) Peter Dumbreck (Germany) Sven Müller (Austria) Martin Ragginger | Porsche 911 GT3 R | SP9 | 84 | 10th | 10th |
| 2021 | (Germany) Falken Motorsports | (Germany) Sven Müller (Belgium) Alessio Picariello (Austria) Martin Ragginger | Porsche 911 GT3 R | SP9 | 59 | 4th | 4th |
| 2022 | (Germany) Falken Motorsports | (Belgium) Alessio Picariello (France) Patrick Pilet (Austria) Martin Ragginger | Porsche 911 GT3 R | SP9 Pro | 58 | DNF | DNF |
| 2023 | (Germany) Falken Motorsports | (Germany) Sven Müller (Belgium) Alessio Picariello | Porsche 911 GT3 R (992) | SP9 Pro | 77 | DNF | DNF |
| 2024 | (Germany) Falken Motorsports | (France) Julien Andlauer (Germany) Sven Müller (Belgium) Alessio Picariello | Porsche 911 GT3 R (992) | SP9 Pro | 50 | 6th | 6th |
| 2026 | (Germany) Falken Motorsports | (Germany) Tim Heinemann (Germany) Sven Müller (Netherlands) Morris Schuring | Porsche 911 GT3 R (992.2) | SP9 Pro | 53 | DNF | DNF |

=== Complete FIA World Endurance Championship results ===
(key) (Races in bold indicate pole position) (Races in italics indicate fastest lap)

| Year | Entrant | Class | Car | Engine | 1 | 2 | 3 | 4 | 5 | 6 | 7 | 8 | 9 | Pos. | Points |
|---|---|---|---|---|---|---|---|---|---|---|---|---|---|---|---|
| 2014 | Proton Competition | LMGTE Am | Porsche 911 RSR | Porsche 4.0 L Flat-6 | SIL; 4 | SPA; 4 | LMS; 2 | COA; 3 | FUJ; 4 | SHA | BHR; 4 | SÃO; 4 | | 5th | 111 |
| 2015 | Abu Dhabi-Proton Racing | LMGTE Am | Porsche 911 RSR | Porsche 4.0 L Flat-6 | SIL; 5 | SPA; 4 | LMS; Ret | NÜR | COA | FUJ | SHA; 7 | BHR; 2 | | 11th | 46 |
| 2016 | Abu Dhabi-Proton Racing | LMGTE Am | Porsche 911 RSR | Porsche 4.0 L Flat-6 | **SIL**; 5 | SPA | LMS | NÜR | MEX | COA | FUJ | SHA | BHR | 29th | 11 |
| 2024 | Manthey Pure Rxcing | LMGT3 | Porsche 911 GT3 R (992) | Porsche 4.2 L Flat-6 | QAT; 1 | **IMO**; 3 | SPA; 2 | **LMS**; 10 | SÃO; 1 | COA; 2 | FUJ; 2 | BHR; 9 | | 1st | 139 |

=== Complete 24 Hours of Le Mans results ===
| Year | Team | Co-Drivers | Car | Class | Laps | Pos. | Class Pos. |
|---|---|---|---|---|---|---|---|
| 2014 | (Germany) Proton Competition | (Germany) Christian Ried (United Arab Emirates) Khaled Al Qubaisi | Porsche 911 RSR | GTE Am | 332 | 21st | **2nd** |
| 2015 | (Germany) Abu Dhabi-Proton Racing | (Germany) Christian Ried (United Arab Emirates) Khaled Al Qubaisi | Porsche 911 RSR | GTE Am | 44 | DNF | DNF |
| 2017 | (Germany) Proton Competition | (Belgium) Stéphane Lémeret (United Arab Emirates) Khaled Al Qubaisi | Porsche 911 RSR | GTE Am | 18 | DNF | DNF |
| 2024 | (Lithuania) Manthey PureRxcing | (Saint Kitts and Nevis) Alex Malykhin (Germany) Joel Sturm | Porsche 911 GT3 R (992) | LMGT3 | 273 | 41st | 14th |
| 2025 | (Germany) Manthey | (Hong Kong) Antares Au (Netherlands) Loek Hartog | Porsche 911 GT3 R (992) | LMGT3 | 340 | 38th | 6th |

=== Complete ADAC GT Masters results ===
(key) (Races in bold indicate pole position) (Races in italics indicate fastest lap)

| Year | Team | Car | 1 | 2 | 3 | 4 | 5 | 6 | 7 | 8 | 9 | 10 | 11 | 12 | 13 | 14 | 15 | 16 | DC | Points |
|---|---|---|---|---|---|---|---|---|---|---|---|---|---|---|---|---|---|---|---|---|
| 2015 | GW IT Racing Team Schütz Motorsport | Porsche 911 GT3 R | OSC; 1; 1 | OSC; 2; 4 | **RBR**; **1**; 5 | RBR; 2; 3 | SPA; 1; 4 | SPA; 2; 8 | **LAU**; **1**; 5 | LAU; 2; 3 | **NÜR**; **1** Ret | **NÜR**; **2**; 3 | SAC; 1; 9 | **SAC**; **2**; 3 | **ZAN**; **1**; 11 | ZAN; 2; 5 | HOC; 1 Ret | HOC; 2 Ret | 4th | 150 |
| 2016 | KÜS Team75 Bernhard | Porsche 911 GT3 R | OSC; 1 | OSC; 2 | SAC; 1; 8 | SAC; 2; 14 | LAU; 1 | LAU; 2 | RBR; 1 | RBR; 2 | | | | | | | | | 42nd | 8 |
| 2016 | BigFM Racing Team Schütz Motorsport | Porsche 911 GT3 R | | | | | | | | | NÜR; 1; 26 | NÜR; 2; 8 | ZAN; 1 | ZAN; 2 | HOC; 1 | HOC; 2 | | | 42nd | 8 |
| 2017 | Schütz Motorsport | Porsche 911 GT3 R | OSC; 1; 2 | OSC; 2; 14 | LAU; 1 Ret | LAU; 2; 13 | RBR; 1; 23 | RBR; 2 DNS | ZAN; 1; 13 | ZAN; 2; 9 | NÜR; 1; 25 | NÜR; 2 Ret | SAC; 1; 6 | SAC; 2; 13 | HOC; 1 Ret | HOC; 2; 19 | | | 22nd | 28 |
| 2018 | KÜS Team75 Bernhard | Porsche 911 GT3 R | OSC; 1; 25 | OSC; 2; 12 | MST; 1; 15 | MST; 2; 14 | RBR; 1; 15 | RBR; 2; 29 | NÜR; 1 Ret | NÜR; 2; 6 | ZAN; 1; 21 | ZAN; 2; 3 | SAC; 1; 16 | **SAC**; **2** Ret | HOC; 1; 12 | HOC; 2 Ret | | | 23rd | 23 |
| 2019 | KÜS Team75 Bernhard | Porsche 911 GT3 R | OSC; 1; 14 | OSC; 2 Ret | MST; 1 Ret | MST; 2; 21 | RBR; 1; 3 | RBR; 2; 22 | ZAN; 1; 2 | ZAN; 2; 10 | NÜR; 1; 13 | NÜR; 2; 1 | HOC; 1; 5 | HOC; 2; 4 | SAC; 1; 16 | SAC; 2; 11 | | | 9th | 103 |
| 2020 | KÜS Team75 Bernhard | Porsche 911 GT3 R | LAU; 1; 19 | LAU; 2; 16 | NÜR; 1; 4 | NÜR; 2; 17 | HOC; 1; 4 | HOC; 2; 27 | SAC; 1; 9 | SAC; 2 Ret | RBR; 1; 18 | RBR; 2 DNS | | | OSC; 1; 8 | OSC; 2 Ret | | | 11th | 77 |
| 2020 | Precote Herberth Motorsport | Porsche 911 GT3 R | | | | | | | | | | | **LAU2**; **1**; 3 | LAU2; 2; 2 | | | | | 11th | 77 |
| 2021 | Precote Herberth Motorsport | Porsche 911 GT3 R | OSC; 1; 21 | OSC; 2; 6 | RBR; 1; 20 | RBR; 2 Ret | ZAN; 1 Ret | ZAN; 2; 13 | LAU; 1; 19 | LAU; 2; 19 | SAC; 1; 7 | SAC; 2 Ret | HOC; 1; 18 | HOC; 2; 24 | NÜR; 1; 18 | **NÜR**; **2**; 7 | | | 23rd | 34 |
| 2022 | ID-Racing with Herberth | Porsche 911 GT3 R | OSC; 1; 4 | OSC; 2; 22 | RBR; 1 | RBR; 2 | ZAN; 1 | ZAN; 2 | NÜR; 1 | NÜR; 2 | | | | | | | | | 32nd | 13 |
| 2022 | Dinamic Motorsport | Porsche 911 GT3 R | | | | | | | | | LAU; 1; 10 | LAU; 2; 17 | SAC; 1 | SAC; 2 | HOC; 1 | HOC; 2 | | | 32nd | 13 |

=== Complete IMSA SportsCar Championship results ===
(key) (Races in bold indicate pole position; results in italics indicate fastest lap)

| Year | Team | Class | Make | Engine | 1 | 2 | 3 | 4 | 5 | 6 | 7 | 8 | 9 | 10 | 11 | 12 | Pos. | Points |
|---|---|---|---|---|---|---|---|---|---|---|---|---|---|---|---|---|---|---|
| 2014 | Dempsey Racing | GTD | Porsche 911 GT America | Porsche 4.0 L Flat-6 | DAY; 19 | SEB | LGA | DET | WGL | MOS | IND | ELK | VIR | COA | PET | | 106th | 13 |
| 2015 | Konrad Motorsport | GTD | Porsche 911 GT America | Porsche 4.0 L Flat-6 | DAY; 19† | SEB | LGA | BEL | WGL | LIM | ELK | VIR | AUS | PET | | | 61st | 1 |
| 2019 | NGT Motorsport by Herberth | GTD | Porsche 911 GT3 R | Porsche 4.0 L Flat-6 | DAY; 21 | SEB | MDO | DET | WGL | MOS | LIM | ELK | VIR | LGA | PET | | 68th | 10 |
| 2020 | Wright Motorsports | GTD | Porsche 911 GT3 R | Porsche 4.0 L Flat-6 | DAY; 4 | DAY | SEB | ELK | VIR | ATL | MDO | CLT | PET | LGA | SEB | | 42nd | 28 |
| 2021 | Wright Motorsports | GTD | Porsche 911 GT3 R | Porsche 4.0 L Flat-6 | DAY; 4 | SEB | MDO | DET | WGL | WGL | LIM | ELK | LGA | LBH | VIR | PET | 46th | 303 |
| 2022 | GMG Racing | GTD | Porsche 911 GT3 R | Porsche 4.0 L Flat-6 | DAY; 22 | SEB | LBH | LGA | MDO | DET | WGL | MOS | LIM | ELK | VIR | PET | 71st | 106 |
| 2023 | Pfaff Motorsports | GTD Pro | Porsche 911 GT3 R (992) | Porsche 4.2 L Flat-6 | DAY; 5 | SEB; 1 | LBH; 3 | LGA; 3 | WGL; 5 | MOS; 2 | LIM; 3 | ELK; 4 | VIR; 3 | **IMS**; 4 | PET; 2 | | 4th | 3578 |
| 2024 | MDK Motorsports | GTD | Porsche 911 GT3 R (992) | Porsche 4.2 L Flat-6 | DAY; 12 | SEB; 12 | LBH | LGA | | WGL; 8 | MOS | ELK | | IMS | PET; 15 | | 42nd | 842 |
| 2024 | AO Racing | GTD Pro | Porsche 911 GT3 R (992) | Porsche 4.2 L Flat-6 | | | | | DET | | | | VIR; 7 | | | | 38th | 263 |
| 2025 | AO Racing | GTD Pro | Porsche 911 GT3 R (992) | Porsche 4.2 L Flat-6 | DAY; 8 | SEB; 1 | LGA; 1 | DET; 5 | WGL; 5 | MOS; 3 | ELK; 8 | VIR; 5 | IMS; 7 | PET; 8 | | | 5th | 2963 |
| 2026 | Manthey Racing | GTD Pro | Porsche 911 GT3 R (992.2) | Porsche 4.2 L Flat-6 | DAY; 5 | SEB; 1 | LGA | DET | WGL; 12 | MOS | ELK; 9 | VIR | IMS | PET; 7 | | | 10th | 1379 |

^{†} Bachler did not complete sufficient laps in order to score full points.

=== Complete GT World Challenge Europe results ===
==== GT World Challenge Europe Sprint Cup ====
(key) (Races in bold indicate pole position) (Races in italics indicate fastest lap)

| Year | Team | Car | Class | 1 | 2 | 3 | 4 | 5 | 6 | 7 | 8 | 9 | 10 | Pos. | Points |
|---|---|---|---|---|---|---|---|---|---|---|---|---|---|---|---|
| 2017 | Attempto Racing | Porsche 911 GT3 R | Pro | MIS; QR | MIS; CR | BRH; QR | BRH; CR | ZOL; QR | ZOL; CR | HUN; QR; 16 | HUN; CR; 10 | NÜR; QR | NÜR; CR | 31st | 1 |
| 2021 | Allied-Racing | Porsche 911 GT3 R | Pro | MAG; 1 | MAG; 2 | ZAN; 1 | ZAN; 2 | MIS; 1; 20 | MIS; 2; 26 | BRH; 1; 19 | BRH; 2; 17 | VAL; 1; 11 | VAL; 2; 21 | NC | 0 |
| 2022 | Dinamic Motorsport | Porsche 911 GT3 R | Pro | BRH; 1; 22 | BRH; 2; 21 | MAG; 1; 20 | MAG; 2; 18 | ZAN; 1; 11 | ZAN; 2; 19 | MIS; 1; 16 | MIS; 2; 13 | VAL; 1 Ret | VAL; 2; 19 | NC | 0 |
| 2023 | Pure Rxcing | Porsche 911 GT3 R (992) | Bronze | MIS; 1 | MIS; 2 | HOC; 1; 20 | HOC; 2; 22 | VAL; 1 | VAL; 2 | | | | | 9th | 19 |
| 2025 | Razoon - more than racing | Porsche 911 GT3 R (992) | Pro | BRH; 1 | BRH; 2 | ZAN; 1 | ZAN; 2 | MIS; 1; 33 | MIS; 2; 23 | MAG; 1 | MAG; 2 | VAL; 1 | VAL; 2 | NC | 0 |
| 2026 | Razoon - more than racing | Porsche 911 GT3 R (992.2) | Pro | BRH; 1 | BRH; 2 | MIS; 1 | MIS; 2 | MAG; 1 | MAG; 2 | ZAN; 1; 4 | ZAN; 2; 18 | CAT; 1 | CAT; 2 | NC‡ | 0‡ |

==== GT World Challenge Europe Endurance Cup ====
(key) (Races in bold indicate pole position) (Races in italics indicate fastest lap)

| Year | Team | Car | Class | 1 | 2 | 3 | 4 | 5 | 6 | 7 | Pos. | Points |
|---|---|---|---|---|---|---|---|---|---|---|---|---|
| 2019 | Dinamic Motorsport | Porsche 911 GT3 R | Pro | MNZ; 1 | SIL; 18 | LEC; 37 | SPA; 6H; 18 | SPA; 12H; 4 | SPA; 24H; 27 | CAT | 8th | 31 |
| 2020 | Rowe Racing | Porsche 911 GT3 R | Pro | IMO; 6 | NÜR; WD | SPA; 6H; 19 | SPA; 12H; 14 | SPA; 24H; 32 | LEC | | 18th | 8 |
| 2021 | Dinamic Motorsport | Porsche 911 GT3 R | Pro | MNZ; 1 | LEC; 7 | SPA; 6H; 18 | SPA; 12H; 6 | SPA; 24H; Ret | NÜR; 40 | CAT; 2 | 6th | 53 |
| 2022 | Dinamic Motorsport | Porsche 911 GT3 R | Pro | IMO; 6 | LEC; Ret | SPA; 6H; 6 | SPA; 12H; Ret | SPA; 24H; Ret | HOC; 3 | CAT; 1 | 4th | 54 |
| 2023 | Pure Rxcing | Porsche 911 GT3 R (992) | Bronze | MNZ; 15 | LEC; Ret | SPA; 6H; 25 | SPA; 12H; 21 | SPA; 24H; 15 | NÜR; 26 | **CAT**; Ret | 5th | 69 |
| 2024 | Pure Rxcing | Porsche 911 GT3 R (992) | Pro | LEC; 8 | SPA; 6H; 11 | SPA; 12H; 6 | SPA; 24H; Ret | NÜR; 20 | MNZ; 8 | JED; 14 | 19th | 12 |
| 2025 | Schumacher CLRT | Porsche 911 GT3 R (992) | Pro | LEC; 3 | MNZ | SPA; 6H; 73† | SPA; 12H; 73† | SPA; 24H; Ret | NÜR; 4 | CAT | 11th | 31 |
| 2026 | High Class Racing | Porsche 911 GT3 R (992.2) | Bronze | LEC | MNZ | SPA; 6H | SPA; 12H | SPA; 24H | NÜR | ALG; Ret | NC | 0 |

=== Complete Asian Le Mans Series results ===
(key) (Races in bold indicate pole position) (Races in italics indicate fastest lap)

| Year | Team | Class | Car | Engine | 1 | 2 | 3 | 4 | 5 | 6 | Pos. | Points |
|---|---|---|---|---|---|---|---|---|---|---|---|---|
| 2021 | Precote Herberth Motorsport | GT | Porsche 911 GT3 R | Porsche 4.0 L Flat-6 | DUB; 1; 15 | **DUB**; **2**; 9 | ABU; 1; 12 | ABU; 2; 13 | | | 15th | 4.5 |
| 2022 | Herberth Motorsport | GT | Porsche 911 GT3 R | Porsche 4.0 L Flat-6 | DUB; 1; 12 | DUB; 2 Ret | ABU; 1; 17 | **ABU**; **2**; 2 | | | 8th | 20 |
| 2023 | Herberth Motorsport | GT | Porsche 911 GT3 R | Porsche 4.0 L Flat-6 | DUB; 1 Ret | DUB; 2; 11 | ABU; 1; 8 | ABU; 2; 12 | | | 16th | 4 |
| 2023-24 | Pure Rxcing | GT | Porsche 911 GT3 R (992) | Porsche 4.2 L Flat-6 | SEP; 1; 6 | SEP; 2; 1 | DUB; 1 | ABU; 1 Ret | ABU; 2; 2 | | 1st | 76 |
| 2024-25 | Manthey Racing | GT | Porsche 911 GT3 R (992) | Porsche 4.2 L Flat-6 | SEP; 1 Ret | SEP; 2; 2 | DUB; 2; 5 | DUB; 2; 4 | ABU; 1; 2 | ABU; 2; 1 | 1st | 86 |
| 2025–26 | Manthey Racing | GT | Porsche 911 GT3 R (992) | Porsche 4.2 L Flat-6 | SEP; 1; 2 | SEP; 2 Ret | DUB; 1; 2 | DUB; 2; 3 | ABU; 1; 9 | ABU; 2; 3 | 7th | 55 |

Sporting positions
| Preceded by Gerhard Tweraser | Formula Lista Junior; Champion; 2007 | Succeeded by Joël Volluz |
