= GU-Racing =

(Germany) GU-Racing
- Founded: 2003
- Team principal(s): Günther Unterreitmeier
- Former series: Superleague Formula; A1 Grand Prix; Formula BMW; Formula Renault; Formula 3 Euro Series

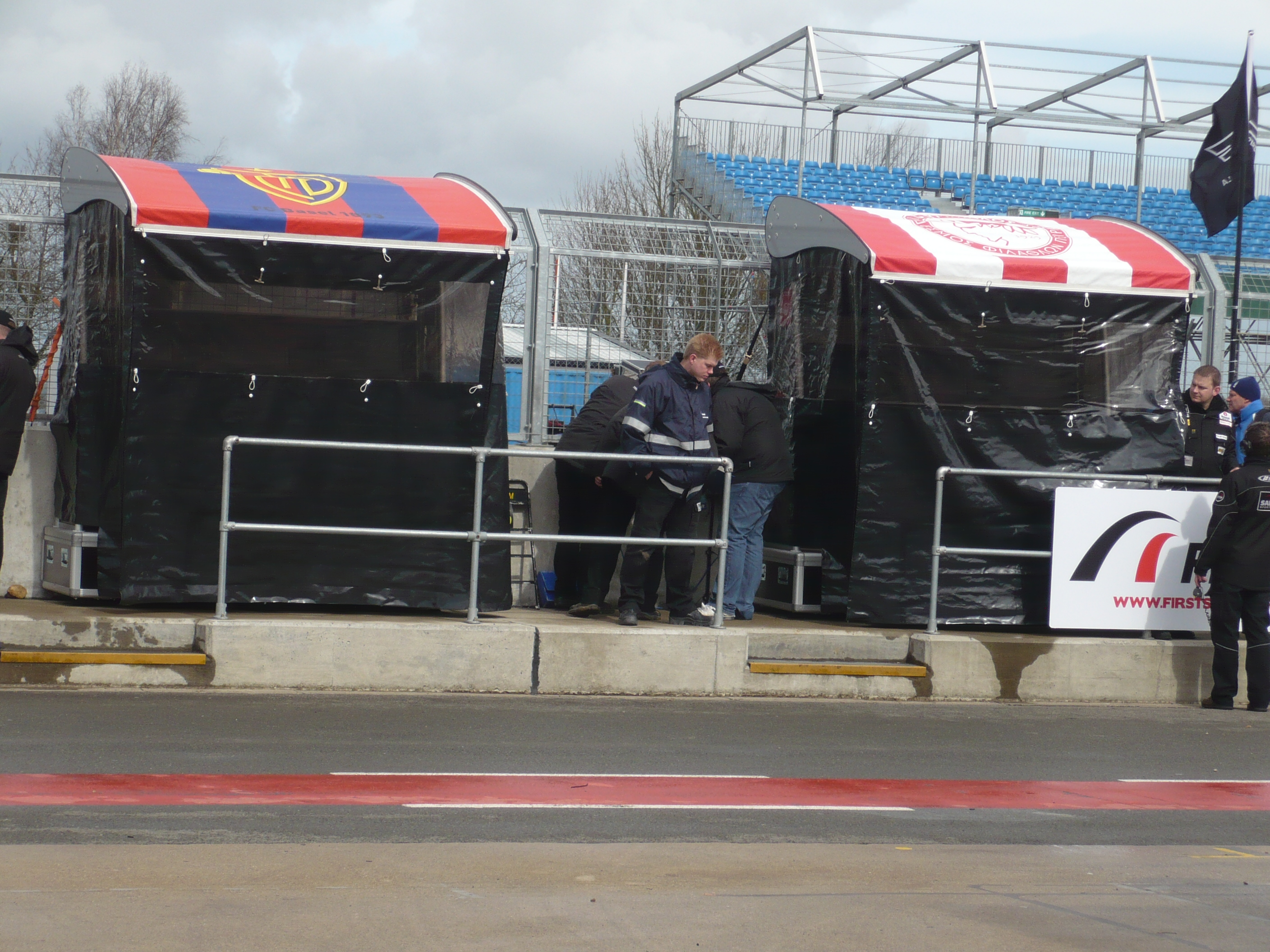
GU-Racing's pit wall during Silverstone Circuit's 2010 Superleague Formula round

GU-Racing is a German racing team owned by Günther Unterreitmeier. The team was founded in 2003.

== History ==
The team has competed in several series, including Superleague Formula running the Olympiacos CFP and the FC Basel 1893 teams. They also run A1 Team Germany in A1 Grand Prix. The team has also had success running in Formula BMW and Formula Renault series around the world.
