= 2025 Grand Prix of Long Beach =

Third round of the 2025 IMSA SportsCar Championship season

The layout of Long Beach Street Circuit, where the race was held

The 2025 Grand Prix of Long Beach (formally known as the 2025 Acura Grand Prix of Long Beach) was a sports car race, held at Long Beach Street Circuit on April 12, 2025. It was the third round of the 2025 IMSA SportsCar Championship.

== Background ==
=== Preview ===
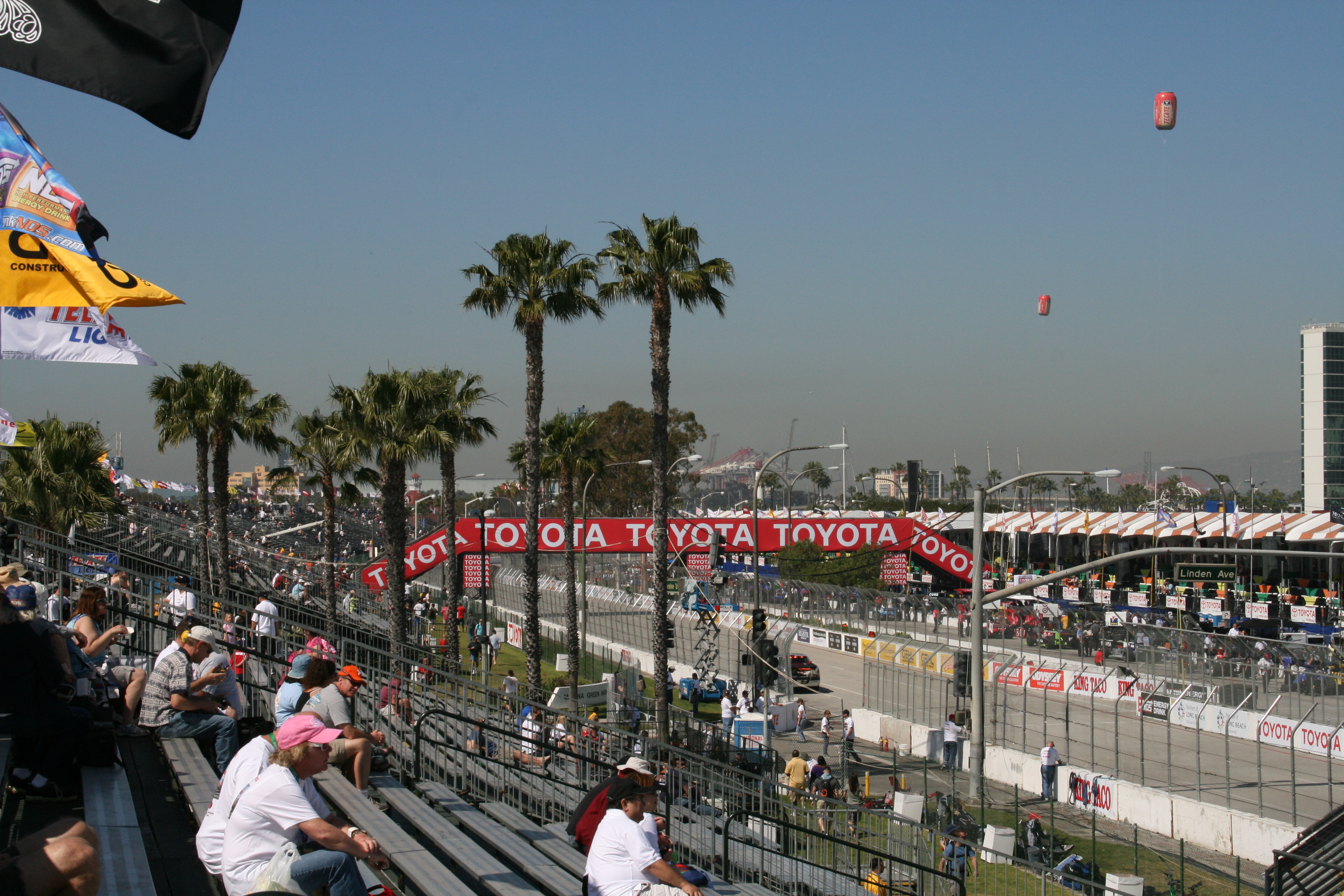
Long Beach Street Circuit (pictured in 2009), where the race was held

International Motor Sports Association (IMSA) president John Doonan confirmed the race was part of the schedule of the 2025 IMSA SportsCar Championship (IMSA SCC) in March 2024. It is the eleventh year the event was held as part of the WeatherTech SportsCar Championship, and the sixteenth annual running of the race, counting the period between 2006 and 2013 when it was a round of the Rolex Sports Car Series and the American Le Mans Series, respectively. The 2025 Grand Prix of Long Beach was the third of eleven scheduled sports car races of 2025 by IMSA. The race was held at the 1.968 mi (3.167 km) Long Beach Street Circuit on April 12, 2025.

=== Standings before the race ===
Preceding the event, Felipe Nasr, Nick Tandy, and Laurens Vanthoor led the GTP Drivers' Championship with 760 points, with Matt Campbell, Kévin Estre, and Mathieu Jaminet in second, 91 points behind. Tom Blomqvist, Colin Braun, and Scott Dixon were third, 173 points behind the leaders. The GTD Drivers' Championship was led by Indy Dontje, Philip Ellis, and Russell Ward with 690 points, 41 points ahead of Tom Gamble, Zacharie Robichon, and Casper Stevenson. Adem Adelson, Elliott Skeer, and Tom Sargent sat in third place, 57 points behind the leading trio. The Teams' Championships were led by Porsche Penske Motorsport in GTP and Winward Racing in GTD, with Porsche and Mercedes-AMG leading their respective Manufacturers' Championships.

== Entry list ==
The entry list was published on April 2, 2025, and featured 27 entries: 11 in GTP, and 16 in GTD.

No.	Entrant	Car	Driver 1	Driver 2
GTP (Grand Touring Prototype) (11 entries)
6	(Germany) Porsche Penske Motorsport	Porsche 963	(Australia) Matt Campbell	(France) Mathieu Jaminet
7	(Germany) Porsche Penske Motorsport	Porsche 963	(Brazil) Felipe Nasr	(United Kingdom) Nick Tandy
10	(United States) Cadillac Wayne Taylor Racing	Cadillac V-Series.R	(Portugal) Filipe Albuquerque	(United States) Ricky Taylor
23	(United States) Aston Martin THOR Team	Aston Martin Valkyrie	(Canada) Roman De Angelis	(United Kingdom) Ross Gunn
24	(United States) BMW M Team RLL	BMW M Hybrid V8	(Austria) Philipp Eng	(Belgium) Dries Vanthoor
25	(United States) BMW M Team RLL	BMW M Hybrid V8	(South Africa) Sheldon van der Linde	(Germany) Marco Wittmann
31	(United States) Cadillac Whelen	Cadillac V-Series.R	(United Kingdom) Jack Aitken	(New Zealand) Earl Bamber
40	(United States) Cadillac Wayne Taylor Racing	Cadillac V-Series.R	(Switzerland) Louis Delétraz	(United States) Jordan Taylor
60	(United States) Acura Meyer Shank Racing w/ Curb-Agajanian	Acura ARX-06	(United Kingdom) Tom Blomqvist	(United States) Colin Braun
85	(United States) JDC–Miller MotorSports	Porsche 963	(Italy) Gianmaria Bruni	(Netherlands) Tijmen van der Helm
93	(United States) Acura Meyer Shank Racing w/ Curb-Agajanian	Acura ARX-06	(United Kingdom) Nick Yelloly	(Netherlands) Renger van der Zande
GTD (GT Daytona) (16 entries)
021	(United States) Triarsi Competizione	Ferrari 296 GT3	(United Kingdom) Stevan McAleer	(United States) Sheena Monk
12	(United States) Vasser Sullivan Racing	Lexus RC F GT3	(United Kingdom) Jack Hawksworth	(Canada) Parker Thompson
13	(Canada) AWA	Chevrolet Corvette Z06 GT3.R	(United Kingdom) Matt Bell	(Canada) Orey Fidani
27	(United States) Heart of Racing Team	Aston Martin Vantage AMR GT3 Evo	(United Kingdom) Tom Gamble	(United Kingdom) Casper Stevenson
32	(United States) Korthoff Competition Motors	Mercedes-AMG GT3 Evo	(United States) Kenton Koch	(United States) Seth Lucas
34	(United States) Conquest Racing	Ferrari 296 GT3	(United States) Manny Franco	(Brazil) Daniel Serra
36	(United States) DXDT Racing	Chevrolet Corvette Z06 GT3.R	(United States) Tommy Milner	(Canada) Robert Wickens
45	(United States) Wayne Taylor Racing	Lamborghini Huracán GT3 Evo 2	(Costa Rica) Danny Formal	(United States) Trent Hindman
57	(United States) Winward Racing	Mercedes-AMG GT3 Evo	(Switzerland) Philip Ellis	(United States) Russell Ward
66	(United States) Gradient Racing	Ford Mustang GT3	(United States) Jenson Altzman	(United States) Robert Megennis
70	(United Kingdom) Inception Racing	Ferrari 296 GT3	(United States) Brendan Iribe	(Denmark) Frederik Schandorff
78	(United States) Forte Racing	Lamborghini Huracán GT3 Evo 2	(Germany) Mario Farnbacher	(Canada) Misha Goikhberg
89	(United States) Vasser Sullivan Racing	Lexus RC F GT3	(United States) Frankie Montecalvo	(United States) Aaron Telitz
96	(United States) Turner Motorsport	BMW M4 GT3 Evo	(United States) Robby Foley	(United States) Patrick Gallagher
120	(United States) Wright Motorsports	Porsche 911 GT3 R (992)	(United States) Adam Adelson	(United States) Elliott Skeer
177	(United States) AO Racing	Porsche 911 GT3 R (992)	(United Kingdom) Jonny Edgar	(Belgium) Laurens Vanthoor

== Qualifying ==
=== Qualifying results ===
Pole positions in each class are indicated in bold and with ‡.

Pos.	Class	No.	Entry	Driver	Time	Gap	Grid
1	**GTP**	**24**	**(United States) BMW M Team RLL**	**(Belgium) Dries Vanthoor**	**1:11.539**	—	1‡
2	GTP	25	(United States) BMW M Team RLL	(South Africa) Sheldon van der Linde	1:11.789	+0.250	2
3	GTP	7	(Germany) Porsche Penske Motorsport	(United Kingdom) Nick Tandy	1:11.989	+0.450	3
4	GTP	6	(Germany) Porsche Penske Motorsport	(France) Mathieu Jaminet	1:12.268	+0.729	4
5	GTP	93	(United States) Acura Meyer Shank Racing w/ Curb-Agajanian	(United Kingdom) Nick Yelloly	1:12.414	+0.875	5
6	GTP	60	(United States) Acura Meyer Shank Racing w/ Curb-Agajanian	(United Kingdom) Tom Blomqvist	1:12.446	+0.907	6
7	GTP	31	(United States) Cadillac Whelen	(United Kingdom) Jack Aitken	1:12.512	+0.973	7
8	GTP	10	(United States) Cadillac Wayne Taylor Racing	(Portugal) Filipe Albuquerque	1:12.964	+1.425	8
9	GTP	85	(United States) JDC–Miller MotorSports	(Netherlands) Tijmen van der Helm	1:13.001	+1.462	9
10	GTP	40	(United States) Cadillac Wayne Taylor Racing	(Switzerland) Louis Delétraz	1:13.015	+1.476	10
11	GTP	23	(United States) Aston Martin THOR Team	(United Kingdom) Ross Gunn	1:13.392	+1.853	11
12	**GTD**	**12**	**(United States) Vasser Sullivan Racing**	**(Canada) Parker Thompson**	**1:17.877**	**+6.338**	12‡
13	GTD	177	(United States) AO Racing	(United Kingdom) Jonny Edgar	1:17.937	+6.398	13
14	GTD	27	(United States) Heart of Racing Team	(United Kingdom) Tom Gamble	1:17.939	+6.400	14
15	GTD	34	(United States) Conquest Racing	(United States) Manny Franco	1:18.168	+6.629	15
16	GTD	96	(United States) Turner Motorsport	(United States) Patrick Gallagher	1:18.275	+6.736	16
17	GTD	89	(United States) Vasser Sullivan Racing	(United States) Frankie Montecalvo	1:18.372	+6.833	17
18	GTD	57	(United States) Winward Racing	(United States) Russell Ward	1:18.378	+6.839	18
19	GTD	36	(United States) DXDT Racing	(Canada) Robert Wickens	1:18.411	+6.872	19
20	GTD	120	(United States) Wright Motorsports	(United States) Adam Adelson	1:18.592	+7.053	20
21	GTD	32	(United States) Korthoff Competition Motors	(United States) Seth Lucas	1:19.062	+7.523	21
22	GTD	13	(Canada) AWA	(Canada) Orey Fidani	1:19.387	+7.848	22
23	GTD	78	(United States) Forte Racing	(Canada) Misha Goikhberg	1:19.432	+7.893	23
24	GTD	70	(United Kingdom) Inception Racing	(United States) Brendan Iribe	1:19.432	+7.893	24
25	GTD	66	(United States) Gradient Racing	(United States) Jenson Altzman	1:19.933	+8.394	25
26	GTD	021	(United States) Triarsi Competizione	(United States) Sheena Monk	1:20.446	+8.907	26
27	GTD	45	(United States) Wayne Taylor Racing	(Costa Rica) Danny Formal	No time set		27

== Post-race ==
With a total of 1140 points, Nasr and Tandy's victory allowed them to extend their advantage in the GTP Drivers' Championship over Campbell and Jaminet. The final results of GTD kept Ellis and Ward atop the Drivers' Championship with 994 points. Hawksworth and Thompson advanced from sixth to second. Porsche Penske Motorsport and Winward Racing continued to top their respective Teams' Championships. Porsche continued to top the GTP Manufacturers' Championships while they took the lead of the GTD Manufacturers' Championship with 8 rounds remaining in the season.

=== Race results ===
Class winners are in bold and ‡.

Pos	Class	No	Team	Drivers	Chassis	Laps	Time/Retired
Pos	Class	No	Team	Drivers	Engine	Laps	Time/Retired
1	**GTP**	**7**	**(Germany) Porsche Penske Motorsport**	**(Brazil) Felipe Nasr (United Kingdom) Nick Tandy**	**Porsche 963**	**75**	**1:40:36.022‡**
1	**GTP**	**7**	**(Germany) Porsche Penske Motorsport**	**(Brazil) Felipe Nasr (United Kingdom) Nick Tandy**	**Porsche 9RD 4.6 L turbo V8**	**75**	**1:40:36.022‡**
2	GTP	6	(Germany) Porsche Penske Motorsport	(Australia) Matt Campbell (France) Mathieu Jaminet	Porsche 963	75	+3.058
2	GTP	6	(Germany) Porsche Penske Motorsport	(Australia) Matt Campbell (France) Mathieu Jaminet	Porsche 9RD 4.6 L turbo V8	75	+3.058
3	GTP	24	(United States) BMW M Team RLL	(Austria) Philipp Eng (Belgium) Dries Vanthoor	BMW M Hybrid V8	75	+12.903
3	GTP	24	(United States) BMW M Team RLL	(Austria) Philipp Eng (Belgium) Dries Vanthoor	BMW P66/3 4.0 L turbo V8	75	+12.903
4	GTP	31	(United States) Cadillac Whelen	(United Kingdom) Jack Aitken (New Zealand) Earl Bamber	Cadillac V-Series.R	75	+17.454
4	GTP	31	(United States) Cadillac Whelen	(United Kingdom) Jack Aitken (New Zealand) Earl Bamber	Cadillac LMC55R 5.5 L V8	75	+17.454
5	GTP	25	(United States) BMW M Team RLL	(South Africa) Sheldon van der Linde (Germany) Marco Wittmann	BMW M Hybrid V8	75	+17.975
5	GTP	25	(United States) BMW M Team RLL	(South Africa) Sheldon van der Linde (Germany) Marco Wittmann	BMW P66/3 4.0 L turbo V8	75	+17.975
6	GTP	10	(United States) Cadillac Wayne Taylor Racing	(Portugal) Filipe Albuquerque (United States) Ricky Taylor	Cadillac V-Series.R	75	+38.319
6	GTP	10	(United States) Cadillac Wayne Taylor Racing	(Portugal) Filipe Albuquerque (United States) Ricky Taylor	Cadillac LMC55R 5.5 L V8	75	+38.319
7	GTP	40	(United States) Cadillac Wayne Taylor Racing	(Switzerland) Louis Delétraz (United States) Jordan Taylor	Cadillac V-Series.R	75	+41.328
7	GTP	40	(United States) Cadillac Wayne Taylor Racing	(Switzerland) Louis Delétraz (United States) Jordan Taylor	Cadillac LMC55R 5.5 L V8	75	+41.328
8	GTP	23	(United States) Aston Martin THOR Team	(Canada) Roman De Angelis (United Kingdom) Ross Gunn	Aston Martin Valkyrie	75	+53.942
8	GTP	23	(United States) Aston Martin THOR Team	(Canada) Roman De Angelis (United Kingdom) Ross Gunn	Aston Martin RA 6.5 L V12	75	+53.942
9	GTP	60	(United States) Acura Meyer Shank Racing w/ Curb-Agajanian	(United Kingdom) Tom Blomqvist (United States) Colin Braun	Acura ARX-06	75	+55.541
9	GTP	60	(United States) Acura Meyer Shank Racing w/ Curb-Agajanian	(United Kingdom) Tom Blomqvist (United States) Colin Braun	Acura AR24e 2.4 L turbo V6	75	+55.541
10	GTP	85	(United States) JDC–Miller MotorSports	(Italy) Gianmaria Bruni (Netherlands) Tijmen van der Helm	Porsche 963	75	+56.861
10	GTP	85	(United States) JDC–Miller MotorSports	(Italy) Gianmaria Bruni (Netherlands) Tijmen van der Helm	Porsche 9RD 4.6 L turbo V8	75	+56.861
11	GTP	93	(United States) Acura Meyer Shank Racing w/ Curb-Agajanian	(United Kingdom) Nick Yelloly (Netherlands) Renger van der Zande	Acura ARX-06	74	+1 Lap
11	GTP	93	(United States) Acura Meyer Shank Racing w/ Curb-Agajanian	(United Kingdom) Nick Yelloly (Netherlands) Renger van der Zande	Acura AR24e 2.4 L turbo V6	74	+1 Lap
12	**GTD**	**177**	**(United States) AO Racing**	**(United Kingdom) Jonny Edgar (Belgium) Laurens Vanthoor**	**Porsche 911 GT3 R (992)**	**71**	**+4 Laps‡**
12	**GTD**	**177**	**(United States) AO Racing**	**(United Kingdom) Jonny Edgar (Belgium) Laurens Vanthoor**	**Porsche M97/80 4.2 L Flat-6**	**71**	**+4 Laps‡**
13	GTD	12	(United States) Vasser Sullivan Racing	(United Kingdom) Jack Hawksworth (Canada) Parker Thompson	Lexus RC F GT3	71	+4 Laps
13	GTD	12	(United States) Vasser Sullivan Racing	(United Kingdom) Jack Hawksworth (Canada) Parker Thompson	Toyota 2UR-GSE 5.4 L V8	71	+4 Laps
14	GTD	89	(United States) Vasser Sullivan Racing	(United States) Frankie Montecalvo (United States) Aaron Telitz	Lexus RC F GT3	71	+4 Laps
14	GTD	89	(United States) Vasser Sullivan Racing	(United States) Frankie Montecalvo (United States) Aaron Telitz	Toyota 2UR-GSE 5.4 L V8	71	+4 Laps
15	GTD	57	(United States) Winward Racing	(Switzerland) Philip Ellis (United States) Russell Ward	Mercedes-AMG GT3 Evo	71	+4 Laps
15	GTD	57	(United States) Winward Racing	(Switzerland) Philip Ellis (United States) Russell Ward	Mercedes-Benz M159 6.2 L V8	71	+4 Laps
16	GTD	96	(United States) Turner Motorsport	(United States) Robby Foley (United States) Patrick Gallagher	BMW M4 GT3 Evo	71	+4 Laps
16	GTD	96	(United States) Turner Motorsport	(United States) Robby Foley (United States) Patrick Gallagher	BMW P58 3.0 L Turbo I6	71	+4 Laps
17	GTD	32	(United States) Korthoff Competition Motors	(United States) Kenton Koch (United States) Seth Lucas	Mercedes-AMG GT3 Evo	71	+4 Laps
17	GTD	32	(United States) Korthoff Competition Motors	(United States) Kenton Koch (United States) Seth Lucas	Mercedes-Benz M159 6.2 L V8	71	+4 Laps
18	GTD	120	(United States) Wright Motorsports	(United States) Adam Adelson (United States) Elliott Skeer	Porsche 911 GT3 R (992)	71	+4 Laps
18	GTD	120	(United States) Wright Motorsports	(United States) Adam Adelson (United States) Elliott Skeer	Porsche M97/80 4.2 L Flat-6	71	+4 Laps
19	GTD	70	(United Kingdom) Inception Racing	(United States) Brendan Iribe (Denmark) Frederik Schandorff	Ferrari 296 GT3	71	+4 Laps
19	GTD	70	(United Kingdom) Inception Racing	(United States) Brendan Iribe (Denmark) Frederik Schandorff	Ferrari F163CE 3.0 L Turbo V6	71	+4 Laps
20	GTD	27	(United States) Heart of Racing Team	(United Kingdom) Tom Gamble (United Kingdom) Casper Stevenson	Aston Martin Vantage AMR GT3 Evo	71	+4 Laps
20	GTD	27	(United States) Heart of Racing Team	(United Kingdom) Tom Gamble (United Kingdom) Casper Stevenson	Aston Martin M177 4.0 L Turbo V8	71	+4 Laps
21	GTD	66	(United States) Gradient Racing	(United States) Jenson Altzman (United States) Robert Megennis	Ford Mustang GT3	71	+4 Laps
21	GTD	66	(United States) Gradient Racing	(United States) Jenson Altzman (United States) Robert Megennis	Ford Coyote 5.4 L V8	71	+4 Laps
22	GTD	45	(United States) Wayne Taylor Racing	(Costa Rica) Danny Formal (United States) Trent Hindman	Lamborghini Huracán GT3 Evo 2	71	+4 Laps
22	GTD	45	(United States) Wayne Taylor Racing	(Costa Rica) Danny Formal (United States) Trent Hindman	Lamborghini DGF 5.2 L V10	71	+4 Laps
23	GTD	78	(United States) Forte Racing	(Germany) Mario Farnbacher (Canada) Misha Goikhberg	Lamborghini Huracán GT3 Evo 2	71	+4 Laps
23	GTD	78	(United States) Forte Racing	(Germany) Mario Farnbacher (Canada) Misha Goikhberg	Lamborghini DGF 5.2 L V10	71	+4 Laps
24	GTD	13	(Canada) AWA	(United Kingdom) Matt Bell (Canada) Orey Fidani	Chevrolet Corvette Z06 GT3.R	71	+4 Laps
24	GTD	13	(Canada) AWA	(United Kingdom) Matt Bell (Canada) Orey Fidani	Chevrolet LT6 5.5 L V8	71	+4 Laps
25	GTD	021	(United States) Triarsi Competizione	(United Kingdom) Stevan McAleer (United States) Sheena Monk	Ferrari 296 GT3	71	+4 Laps
25	GTD	021	(United States) Triarsi Competizione	(United Kingdom) Stevan McAleer (United States) Sheena Monk	Ferrari F163CE 3.0 L Turbo V6	71	+4 Laps
26	GTD	36	(United States) DXDT Racing	(United States) Tommy Milner (Canada) Robert Wickens	Chevrolet Corvette Z06 GT3.R	70	+5 Laps
26	GTD	36	(United States) DXDT Racing	(United States) Tommy Milner (Canada) Robert Wickens	Chevrolet LT6 5.5 L V8	70	+5 Laps
27 DNF	GTD	34	(United States) Conquest Racing	(United States) Manny Franco (Brazil) Daniel Serra	Ferrari 296 GT3	15	Accident damage
27 DNF	GTD	34	(United States) Conquest Racing	(United States) Manny Franco (Brazil) Daniel Serra	Ferrari F163CE 3.0 L Turbo V6	15	Accident damage

== Standings after the race ==
GTP Drivers' Championship standings
Pos.	+/–	Driver	Points
1		(Brazil) Felipe Nasr (United Kingdom) Nick Tandy	1140
2		(France) Mathieu Jaminet (Australia) Matt Campbell	1017
3	4	(Austria) Philipp Eng (Belgium) Dries Vanthoor	875
4	2	(United Kingdom) Jack Aitken (New Zealand) Earl Bamber	850
5	2	(United Kingdom) Tom Blomqvist (United States) Colin Braun	832

LMP2 Drivers' Championship standings
Pos.	+/–	Driver	Points
1		(Brazil) Felipe Fraga (United States) Gar Robinson (Australia) Josh Burdon	645
2		(United States) Dan Goldburg (United Kingdom) Paul di Resta (Sweden) Rasmus Lindh	643
3		(United States) Bijoy Garg (France) Tom Dillmann	602
4		(United States) Steven Thomas (New Zealand) Hunter McElrea (Denmark) Mikkel Jensen	591
5		(Denmark) Benjamin Pedersen (Switzerland) Mathias Beche (United States) Rodrigo Sales	576

GTD Pro Drivers' Championship standings
Pos.	+/–	Driver	Points
1		(Germany) Christopher Mies (Norway) Dennis Olsen (Belgium) Frédéric Vervisch	653
2		(Austria) Klaus Bachler (Germany) Laurin Heinrich (Belgium) Alessio Picariello	636
3		(United States) Connor De Phillippi (United States) Madison Snow (United States) Neil Verhagen	628
4		(United Kingdom) Sebastian Priaulx (Germany) Mike Rockenfeller	617
5		(Spain) Antonio García (Spain) Daniel Juncadella (United Kingdom) Alexander Sims	614

GTD Drivers' Championship standings
Pos.	+/–	Driver	Points
1		(Switzerland) Philip Ellis (United States) Russell Ward	994
2	4	(United Kingdom) Jack Hawksworth (Canada) Parker Thompson	903
3	1	(United Kingdom) Tom Gamble (United Kingdom) Casper Stevenson	899
4	1	(United States) Adam Adelson (United States) Elliott Skeer	895
5	1	(United States) Frankie Montecalvo	875

Note: Only the top five positions are included for all sets of standings.

GTP Teams' Championship standings
Pos.	+/–	Team	Points
1		(Germany) #7 Porsche Penske Motorsport	1140
2		(Germany) #6 Porsche Penske Motorsport	1017
3	4	(United States) #24 BMW M Team RLL	875
4	2	(United States) #31 Cadillac Whelen	850
5	2	(United States) #60 Acura Meyer Shank Racing w/ Curb-Agajanian	832

LMP2 Teams' Championship standings
Pos.	+/–	Team	Points
1		(United States) #74 Riley	645
2		(United States) #22 United Autosports USA	643
3		(Poland) #43Inter Europol Competition	602
4		(France) #11 TDS Racing	591
5		(United States) #52 PR1/Mathiasen Motorsports	576

GTD Pro Teams' Championship standings
Pos.	+/–	Team	Points
1		(Canada) #65 Ford Multimatic Motorsports	653
2		(United States) #77 AO Racing	636
3		(United States) #1 Paul Miller Racing	628
4		(Canada) #64 Ford Multimatic Motorsports	617
5		(United States) #3 Corvette Racing by Pratt Miller Motorsports	614

GTD Teams' Championship standings
Pos.	+/–	Team	Points
1		(United States) #57 Winward Racing	994
2	4	(United States) #12 Vasser Sullivan Racing	903
3	1	(United States) #27 Heart of Racing Team	899
4	1	(United States) #120 Wright Motorsports	895
5		(United States) #96 Turner Motorsport	835

Note: Only the top five positions are included for all sets of standings.

GTP Manufacturers' Championship standings
Pos.	+/–	Manufacturer	Points
1		(Germany) Porsche	1142
2	1	(Germany) BMW	1005
3	1	(Japan) Acura	994
4		(United States) Cadillac	964
5	1	(United Kingdom) Aston Martin	592

GTD Pro Manufacturers' Championship standings
Pos.	+/–	Manufacturer	Points
1		(United States) Ford	689
2		(Germany) BMW	682
3		(Germany) Porsche	658
4		(United States) Chevrolet	638
5		(Italy) Ferrari	618

GTD Manufacturers' Championship standings
Pos.	+/–	Manufacturer	Points
1	2	(Germany) Porsche	694
2	1	(Germany) Mercedes-AMG	654
3	2	(Japan) Lexus	639
4	2	(United Kingdom) Aston Martin	636
5	1	(United States) Chevrolet	608

Note: Only the top five positions are included for all sets of standings.

IMSA SportsCar Championship
Previous race: 12 Hours of Sebring	2025 season	Next race: Monterey SportsCar Championship
