= Manny Franco =

Manny Franco may refer to:

- Manuel Franco (jockey) (born 1994), Puerto Rican jockey
- Manny Franco (racing driver), American auto racing driver

== See also ==
- Manuel Franco (1871–1919), President of Paraguay 1916–1919
