= 2024 Petit Le Mans =

Sportscar endurance race in Georgia, US

The layout of Road Atlanta, where the race took place

The 2024 Petit Le Mans (officially known as the 2024 Motul Petit Le Mans) was a sports car race held at Road Atlanta in Braselton, Georgia, on October 12, 2024. It was the eleventh and final round of the 2024 IMSA SportsCar Championship, as well as the fifth and final round of the Michelin Endurance Cup. The event was the 27th running of the Petit Le Mans since its inception.

== Background ==
=== Preview ===
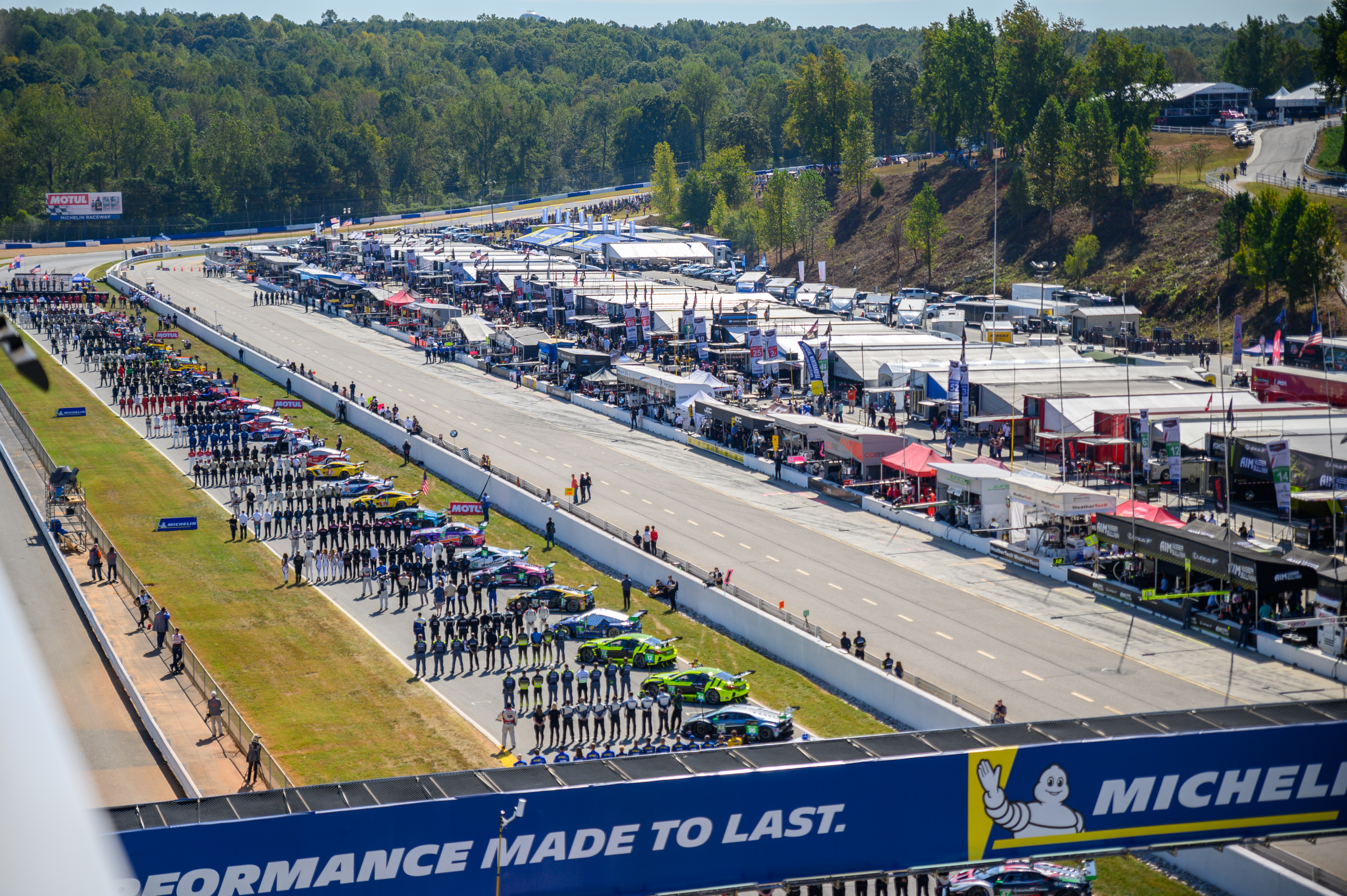
Road Atlanta, where the race took place

International Motor Sports Association (IMSA) president John Doonan confirmed the race was part of the 2024 IMSA SportsCar Championship (IMSA SCC) in August 2023. It was the eleventh consecutive year the IMSA SCC hosted the race at Road Atlanta. The 2024 Petit Le Mans was the final of eleven scheduled sports car races of 2024 by IMSA, and was held at the twelve-turn 2.540 mi (4.088 km) Road Atlanta on October 12, 2024.

=== Balance of performance ===
Ahead of the event, IMSA published a bulletin regarding the latest balance of performance (BoP) changes in the GTP, GTD Pro, and GTD classes. In the GTP class, the Porsche received a 1-kilogram increase in weight, with a 3 kilowatts power decrease. The Battle on the Bricks-winning BMW had a weight increase of 5 kilograms, with a 3 kilowatts increase in power. The car weights for the Acura, Cadillac, and Lamborghini remained the same, but the Acura had a 2-kilowatts power reduction, the Cadillac received a 1-kilowatt power reduction, with the Lamborghini gaining one additional kilowatt of power. In the GT classes, the McLaren had a weight break of 10 kilograms, whilst the Acura received a power increase of 11.3 horsepower. All other GT cars ran with the same BoP as during the previous event at Indianapolis.

=== Standings before the race ===
Preceding the event, Dane Cameron and Felipe Nasr led the GTP Drivers' Championship with 2,650 points, 124 ahead of teammates Mathieu Jaminet and Nick Tandy. Renger van der Zande and Sébastien Bourdais sat in third, an additional 40 points behind. After their second place at Indianapolis, Nick Boulle and Tom Dillmann led the LMP2 Drivers' Championship by 98 points over Felipe Fraga and Gar Robinson. The GTD Pro Drivers' Championship leader Laurin Heinrich had a 99-point advantage over second-placed Ross Gunn, with Bryan Sellers and Madison Snow in third, 219 points behind. Ben Barnicoat and Jack Hawksworth were in fourth. The GTD Drivers' Championship was led by Philip Ellis and Russell Ward with 3,006 points, 222 points ahead of Patrick Gallagher, with Mikaël Grenier in third. The Teams' Championships were led by Porsche Penske Motorsport, Inter Europol by PR1/Mathiasen Motorsports, AO Racing, and Winward Racing, respectively, whilst the Manufacturers' Championships were led by Porsche in GTP and GTD Pro. Mercedes-AMG had already clinched the GTD Manufacturers' Championship.

== Entry list ==
The entry list was revealed on October 2, 2024, and featured 54 entries: 11 entries in GTP, 10 in LMP2, 13 in GTD Pro, and 20 entries in GTD.

No.	Entrant	Car	Driver 1	Driver 2	Driver 3
Grand Touring Prototype (GTP) (11 entries)
01	(United States) Cadillac Racing	Cadillac V-Series.R	(France) Sébastien Bourdais	(New Zealand) Scott Dixon	(Netherlands) Renger van der Zande
5	(Germany) Proton Competition Mustang Sampling	Porsche 963	(Italy) Gianmaria Bruni	(Belgium) Alessio Picariello	(Netherlands) Bent Viscaal
6	(Germany) Porsche Penske Motorsport	Porsche 963	(France) Kévin Estre	(France) Mathieu Jaminet	(United Kingdom) Nick Tandy
7	(Germany) Porsche Penske Motorsport	Porsche 963	(United States) Dane Cameron	(Australia) Matt Campbell	(Brazil) Felipe Nasr
10	(United States) Wayne Taylor Racing with Andretti	Acura ARX-06	(Portugal) Filipe Albuquerque	(New Zealand) Brendon Hartley	(United States) Ricky Taylor
24	(United States) BMW M Team RLL	BMW M Hybrid V8	(Austria) Philipp Eng	(Brazil) Augusto Farfus	(Finland) Jesse Krohn
25	(United States) BMW M Team RLL	BMW M Hybrid V8	(United States) Connor De Phillippi	(Belgium) Maxime Martin	(United Kingdom) Nick Yelloly
31	(United States) Whelen Cadillac Racing	Cadillac V-Series.R	(United Kingdom) Jack Aitken	(United Kingdom) Tom Blomqvist	(Brazil) Pipo Derani
40	(United States) Wayne Taylor Racing with Andretti	Acura ARX-06	(Switzerland) Louis Delétraz	(United States) Colton Herta	(United States) Jordan Taylor
63	(Italy) Lamborghini – Iron Lynx	Lamborghini SC63	(Italy) Matteo Cairoli	(Italy) Andrea Caldarelli	(France) Romain Grosjean
85	(United States) JDC–Miller MotorSports	Porsche 963	(United Kingdom) Phil Hanson	(Netherlands) Tijmen van der Helm	(United Kingdom) Richard Westbrook
Le Mans Prototype 2 (LMP2) (10 entries)
2	(United States) United Autosports USA	Oreca 07-Gibson	(United Kingdom) Ben Hanley	(United States) Ben Keating	(Chile) Nico Pino
8	(United States) Tower Motorsports	Oreca 07-Gibson	(Mexico) Sebastián Álvarez	(Canada) John Farano	(Denmark) Frederik Vesti
11	(France) TDS Racing	Oreca 07-Gibson	(Denmark) Mikkel Jensen	(New Zealand) Hunter McElrea	(United States) Steven Thomas
18	(United States) Era Motorsport	Oreca 07-Gibson	(United Kingdom) Ryan Dalziel	(United States) Dwight Merriman	(United States) Connor Zilisch
20	(Denmark) MDK by High Class Racing	Oreca 07-Gibson	(Denmark) Dennis Andersen	(United States) Scott Huffaker	(United States) Seth Lucas
22	(United States) United Autosports USA	Oreca 07-Gibson	(United States) Bijoy Garg	(United States) Dan Goldburg	(United Kingdom) Paul di Resta
52	(Poland) Inter Europol by PR1/Mathiasen Motorsports	Oreca 07-Gibson	(United States) Nick Boulle	(France) Tom Dillmann	(Poland) Jakub Śmiechowski
74	(United States) Riley	Oreca 07-Gibson	(Australia) Josh Burdon	(Brazil) Felipe Fraga	(United States) Gar Robinson
88	(Italy) Richard Mille AF Corse	Oreca 07-Gibson	(Argentina) Luis Pérez Companc	(Denmark) Nicklas Nielsen	(France) Lilou Wadoux
99	(United States) AO Racing	Oreca 07-Gibson	(Australia) Matthew Brabham	(France) Paul-Loup Chatin	(United States) P. J. Hyett
GT Daytona Pro (GTD Pro) (13 entries)
027	(United States) Heart of Racing Team	Aston Martin Vantage AMR GT3 Evo	(Germany) Mario Farnbacher	(Canada) Zacharie Robichon	(Denmark) Marco Sørensen
1	(United States) Paul Miller Racing	BMW M4 GT3	(United States) Bryan Sellers	(United States) Madison Snow	(United States) Neil Verhagen
3	(United States) Corvette Racing by Pratt Miller Motorsports	Chevrolet Corvette Z06 GT3.R	(Spain) Antonio García	(Spain) Daniel Juncadella	(United Kingdom) Alexander Sims
4	(United States) Corvette Racing by Pratt Miller Motorsports	Chevrolet Corvette Z06 GT3.R	(New Zealand) Earl Bamber	(Netherlands) Nicky Catsburg	(United States) Tommy Milner
9	(Canada) Pfaff Motorsports	McLaren 720S GT3 Evo	(Canada) James Hinchcliffe	(United Kingdom) Oliver Jarvis	(Germany) Marvin Kirchhöfer
14	(United States) Vasser Sullivan	Lexus RC F GT3	(United Kingdom) Ben Barnicoat	(United Kingdom) Jack Hawksworth	(United States) Kyle Kirkwood
19	(Italy) Iron Lynx	Lamborghini Huracán GT3 Evo 2	(Italy) Mirko Bortolotti	(South Africa) Jordan Pepper	(France) Franck Perera
23	(United States) Heart of Racing Team	Aston Martin Vantage AMR GT3 Evo	(Canada) Roman De Angelis	(United Kingdom) Ross Gunn	(Spain) Alex Riberas
62	(United States) Risi Competizione	Ferrari 296 GT3	(Italy) Alessandro Pier Guidi	(Italy) Davide Rigon	(Brazil) Daniel Serra
64	(Canada) Ford Multimatic Motorsports	Ford Mustang GT3	(Germany) Christopher Mies	(Germany) Mike Rockenfeller	(United Kingdom) Harry Tincknell
65	(Canada) Ford Multimatic Motorsports	Ford Mustang GT3	(United States) Joey Hand	(Germany) Dirk Müller	(Belgium) Frédéric Vervisch
77	(United States) AO Racing	Porsche 911 GT3 R (992)	(France) Julien Andlauer	(Denmark) Michael Christensen	(Germany) Laurin Heinrich
82	(United States) DragonSpeed	Ferrari 296 GT3	(Monaco) Vincent Abril	(France) Thomas Neubauer	(Finland) Toni Vilander
GT Daytona (GTD) (20 entries)
023	(United States) Triarsi Competizione	Ferrari 296 GT3	(Italy) Alessio Rovera	(United States) Charlie Scardina	(United States) Onofrio Triarsi
12	(United States) Vasser Sullivan	Lexus RC F GT3	(United States) Frankie Montecalvo	(United States) Aaron Telitz	(Canada) Parker Thompson
13	(Canada) AWA	Chevrolet Corvette Z06 GT3.R	(United Kingdom) Matt Bell	(Canada) Orey Fidani	(Germany) Lars Kern
21	(Italy) AF Corse	Ferrari 296 GT3	(France) François Heriau	(United Kingdom) Simon Mann	(Spain) Miguel Molina
32	(United States) Korthoff/Preston Motorsports	Mercedes-AMG GT3 Evo	(Canada) Mikaël Grenier	(United States) Kenton Koch	(United States) Mike Skeen
34	(United States) Conquest Racing	Ferrari 296 GT3	(Spain) Albert Costa	(United States) Manny Franco	(Monaco) Cédric Sbirrazzuoli
43	(United States) Andretti Motorsports	Porsche 911 GT3 R (992)	(United States) Jarett Andretti	(Colombia) Gabby Chaves	(Canada) Scott Hargrove
44	(United States) Magnus Racing	Aston Martin Vantage AMR GT3 Evo	(United States) Andy Lally	(United States) John Potter	(United States) Spencer Pumpelly
45	(United States) Wayne Taylor Racing with Andretti	Lamborghini Huracán GT3 Evo 2	(United States) Graham Doyle	(Costa Rica) Danny Formal	(Canada) Kyle Marcelli
47	(Italy) Cetilar Racing	Ferrari 296 GT3	(Italy) Antonio Fuoco	(Italy) Roberto Lacorte	(Italy) Giorgio Sernagiotto
55	(Germany) Proton Competition	Ford Mustang GT3	(United States) Ryan Hardwick	(Italy) Giammarco Levorato	(United States) Corey Lewis
57	(United States) Winward Racing	Mercedes-AMG GT3 Evo	(Netherlands) Indy Dontje	(Switzerland) Philip Ellis	(United States) Russell Ward
66	(United States) Gradient Racing	Acura NSX GT3 Evo22	(Colombia) Tatiana Calderón	(United Kingdom) Stevan McAleer	(United States) Sheena Monk
70	(United Kingdom) Inception Racing	Ferrari 296 GT3	(United States) Brendan Iribe	(United Kingdom) Ollie Millroy	(Denmark) Frederik Schandorff
78	(United States) Forte Racing	Lamborghini Huracán GT3 Evo 2	(Canada) Devlin DeFrancesco	(Canada) Misha Goikhberg	(Italy) Loris Spinelli
80	(United States) Lone Star Racing	Mercedes-AMG GT3 Evo	(Angola) Rui Andrade	(Australia) Scott Andrews	(Turkey) Salih Yoluç
83	(Italy) Iron Dames	Lamborghini Huracán GT3 Evo 2	(Belgium) Sarah Bovy	(Switzerland) Rahel Frey	(Denmark) Michelle Gatting
86	(United States) MDK Motorsports	Porsche 911 GT3 R (992)	(Austria) Klaus Bachler	(Denmark) Anders Fjordbach	(China) Kerong Li
96	(United States) Turner Motorsport	BMW M4 GT3	(United States) Robby Foley	(United States) Patrick Gallagher	(United States) Jake Walker
120	(United States) Wright Motorsports	Porsche 911 GT3 R (992)	(United States) Adam Adelson	(Belgium) Jan Heylen	(United States) Elliott Skeer

== Practice ==
There were three practice sessions preceding the start of the race on Saturday, one on Thursday morning, one on Thursday afternoon, and one on Thursday evening. The first session on Thursday morning lasted 90 minutes while the second session on Thursday afternoon lasted 75 minutes, and the final session on Thursday evening lasted 90 minutes.

In the first session, Sébastien Bourdais set the fastest lap in the No. 01 CGR Cadillac at 1 minute, 11.013 seconds, 0.476 seconds quicker than Aitken's No. 31 WCR car. Mathieu Jaminet put the No. 6 Penske Porsche in third overall. BMW were fourth after a lap by Eng, and Nasr's No. 7 Penske Porsche was fifth. Felipe Fraga led LMP2 in Riley's No. 74 car with a 1:12.823 lap, 0.249 seconds ahead of Hanley's No. 2 United Autosports Oreca. Jordan Pepper led GTD Pro in Iron Lynx's No. 19 car, followed by Gunn's No. 23 Heart Aston Martin. Molina's No. 21 AF Corse Ferrari paced GTD, followed by Spinelli's No. 78 Forte car.

In the second session, Jordan Taylor's No. 40 WTR Acura lapped quickest at 1:11.081, ahead of the No. 31 Cadillac of Aitken and Tandy's No. 6 Penske car. Albuquerque was fourth in the No. 10 WTR Acura and Eng in the No. 24 BMW was fifth. Jensen led LMP2 with a 1:13:373 lap in TDS Racing's No. 11 Oreca, 0.001 seconds ahead of Zilisch's Era Motorsport car. Serra's 1:18.722 lap led the GTD Pro class in Risi's No. 62 Ferrari, 0.015 seconds faster than Hawksworth's No. 14 VasserSullivan Lexus; Gunn's No. 23 Heart Aston Martin was third. Parker Thompson's No. 12 VasserSullivan Lexus recorded the fastest time amongst all GTD cars, followed by Philip Ellis' No. 57 Winward car.

Van der Zande led the final session in the No. 01 CGR car with a lap of 1 minute, 11.626 seconds. Caldarelli's No. 63 Lamborghini was second-fastest. Nasr was third in the No. 7 Penske Porsche and Farfus in the No. 24 BMW was fourth. Hanley in LMP2 led for United Autosports with a 1-minute, 13.178 lap, from Inter Europol by PR1/Mathiasen Motorsports' Tom Dillmann and Mikkel Jensen's No. 11 TDS Racing car. Heinrich led GTD Pro in AO Racing's No. 77 car with a 1:19.273 lap, 0.044 seconds faster than Snow's No. 1 Paul Miller BMW. Foley's No. 96 Turner car paced GTD, followed by Bachler's No. 86 MDK Porsche.

== Qualifying ==
Friday's afternoon qualifying session was broken into three sessions, with one session for the GTP, LMP2, GTD Pro and GTD classes, which lasted 15 minutes each. The rules dictated that all teams nominated a driver to qualify their cars, with the Pro-Am LMP2 class requiring a Bronze rated driver to qualify the car. The competitors' fastest lap times determined the starting order. IMSA then arranged the grid to put GTPs ahead of the LMP2, GTD Pro, and GTD cars.

=== Qualifying results ===
Pole positions in each class are indicated in bold and with ‡.

Pos.	Class	No.	Entry	Driver	Time	Gap	Grid
1	**GTP**	**31**	**(United States) Whelen Cadillac Racing**	**(United Kingdom) Jack Aitken**	**1:09.639**	**_**	1‡
2	GTP	7	(Germany) Porsche Penske Motorsport	(Australia) Matt Campbell	1:09.709	+0.070	2
3	GTP	25	(United States) BMW M Team RLL	(United States) Connor De Phillippi	1:09.929	+0.290	3
4	GTP	01	(United States) Cadillac Racing	(France) Sébastien Bourdais	1:09.964	+0.325	4
5	GTP	10	(United States) Wayne Taylor Racing with Andretti	(Portugal) Filipe Albuquerque	1:09.995	+0.356	5
6	GTP	85	(United States) JDC–Miller MotorSports	(United Kingdom) Phil Hanson	1:10.103	+0.464	6
7	GTP	40	(United States) Wayne Taylor Racing with Andretti	(United States) Jordan Taylor	1:10.103	+0.464	7
8	GTP	6	(Germany) Porsche Penske Motorsport	(United Kingdom) Nick Tandy	1:10.212	+0.573	8
9	GTP	24	(United States) BMW M Team RLL	(Austria) Philipp Eng	1:10.261	+0.622	9
10	GTP	5	(Germany) Proton Competition Mustang Sampling	(Belgium) Alessio Picariello	1:10.636	+0.997	10
11	GTP	63	(Italy) Lamborghini – Iron Lynx	(Italy) Andrea Caldarelli	1:10.851	+1.212	11
12	**LMP2**	**2**	**(United States) United Autosports USA**	**(United States) Ben Keating**	**1:12.739**	**+3.100**	12‡
13	LMP2	11	(France) TDS Racing	(United States) Steven Thomas	1:12.973	+3.334	13
14	LMP2	99	(United States) AO Racing	(United States) P. J. Hyett	1:13.043	+3.404	14
15	LMP2	52	(Poland) Inter Europol by PR1/Mathiasen Motorsports	(United States) Nick Boulle	1:13.080	+3.441	15
16	LMP2	22	(United States) United Autosports USA	(United States) Dan Goldburg	1:13.316	+3.677	16
17	LMP2	74	(United States) Riley	(United States) Gar Robinson	1:13.648	+4.009	17
18	LMP2	20	(Denmark) MDK by High Class Racing	(Denmark) Dennis Andersen	1:14.283	+4.644	18
19	LMP2	88	(Italy) Richard Mille AF Corse	(Argentina) Luis Pérez Companc	1:14.432	+4.793	19
20	LMP2	18	(United States) Era Motorsport	(United States) Dwight Merriman	1:14.839	+5.200	20
21	LMP2	8	(United States) Tower Motorsports	(Canada) John Farano	1:15.044	+5.405	21
22	**GTD Pro**	**77**	**(United States) AO Racing**	**(Germany) Laurin Heinrich**	**1:17.881**	**+8.242**	22‡
23	GTD Pro	4	(United States) Corvette Racing by Pratt Miller Motorsports	(United States) Tommy Milner	1:17.933	+8.294	23
24	GTD Pro	23	(United States) Heart of Racing Team	(United Kingdom) Ross Gunn	1:18.041	+8.402	24
25	GTD Pro	3	(United States) Corvette Racing by Pratt Miller Motorsports	(Spain) Antonio García	1:18.085	+8.446	25
26	GTD Pro	65	(Canada) Ford Multimatic Motorsports	(Belgium) Frédéric Vervisch	1:18.106	+8.467	26
27	**GTD**	**80**	**(United States) Lone Star Racing**	**(Australia) Scott Andrews**	**1:18.281**	**+8.642**	27‡
28	GTD Pro	64	(Canada) Ford Multimatic Motorsports	(United Kingdom) Harry Tincknell	1:18.307	+8.668	28
29	GTD Pro	19	(Italy) Iron Lynx	(France) Franck Perera	1:18.322	+8.683	29
30	GTD Pro	027	(United States) Heart of Racing Team	(Denmark) Marco Sørensen	1:18.457	+8.818	30
31	GTD	96	(United States) Turner Motorsport	(United States) Robby Foley	1:18.539	+8.900	31
32	GTD Pro	9	(Canada) Pfaff Motorsports	(United Kingdom) Oliver Jarvis	1:18.559	+8.920	32
33	GTD Pro	1	(United States) Paul Miller Racing	(United States) Madison Snow	1:18.694	+9.055	33
34	GTD Pro	14	(United States) Vasser Sullivan	(United Kingdom) Jack Hawksworth	1:18.703	+9.064	34
35	GTD	57	(United States) Winward Racing	(Switzerland) Philip Ellis	1:18.751	+9.112	35
36	GTD	32	(United States) Korthoff/Preston Motorsports	(United States) Mike Skeen	1:18.897	+9.258	36
37	GTD	45	(United States) Wayne Taylor Racing with Andretti	(Costa Rica) Danny Formal	1:19.063	+9.424	37
38	GTD	21	(Italy) AF Corse	(United Kingdom) Simon Mann	1:19.087	+9.448	38
39	GTD	34	(United States) Conquest Racing	(Switzerland) Rahel Frey	1:19.209	+9.570	39
40	GTD	83	(Italy) Iron Dames	(United States) Manny Franco	1:19.249	+9.610	40
41	GTD Pro	82	(United States) DragonSpeed	(Finland) Toni Vilander	1:19.368	+9.729	41
42	GTD	47	(Italy) Cetilar Racing	(Italy) Giorgio Sernagiotto	1:19.396	+9.757	42
43	GTD	78	(United States) Forte Racing	(Canada) Misha Goikhberg	1:19.572	+9.933	43
44	GTD Pro	62	(United States) Risi Competizione	(Brazil) Daniel Serra	1:19.581^{1}	+9.942	44
45	GTD	70	(United Kingdom) Inception Racing	(United States) Brendan Iribe	1:19.678	+10.039	45
46	GTD	55	(Germany) Proton Competition	(United States) Ryan Hardwick	1:19.761	+10.122	46
47	GTD	120	(United States) Wright Motorsports	(United States) Adam Adelson	1:20.246	+10.607	47
48	GTD	66	(United States) Gradient Racing	(United States) Sheena Monk	1:20.375	+10.736	48
49	GTD	44	(United States) Magnus Racing	(United States) John Potter	1:20.656	+11.017	49
50	GTD	86	(United States) MDK Motorsports	(China) Kerong Li	1:21.481	+11.842	50
51	GTD	12	(United States) Vasser Sullivan	(Canada) Parker Thompson	1:23.216^{2}	+13.577	51
52	GTD	13	(Canada) AWA	No Time Established			52
53	GTD	023	(United States) Triarsi Competizione	No Time Established			53
Sources:

- ^{1} The No. 62 Risi Ferrari had its two fastest laps deleted as penalty for causing a red flag during its qualifying session.
- ^{2} The No. 12 Vasser Sullivan Lexus had its two fastest laps deleted as penalty for causing a red flag during its qualifying session.

== Race ==
=== Post-race ===
Cameron and Nasr took the GTP Drivers' Championship with 2982 points. They were 113 points clear of Jaminet and Tandy. With 2227 points, Boulle and Dillmann won the LMP2 Drivers' Championship, 61 points ahead of Fraga and Robinson. Heinrich took the GTD Pro Drivers' Championship with 3122 points. He was 4 points clear of Gunn in second position. García and Sims were third with 2934 points. Ellis and Ward won the GTD Drivers' Championship with 3266 points, 230 points ahead of Foley and Gallagher. Grenier was third with 2661 points. Porsche and Mercedes-AMG won their respective Manufactures' Championships, while Porsche Penske Motorsport, Inter Europol by PR1/Mathiasen Motorsports, AO Racing, and Winward Racing won their respective Teams' Championships.

=== Race results ===
Class winners are in bold and ‡.

Pos	Class	No	Team	Drivers	Chassis	Laps	Time/Retired
Pos	Class	No	Team	Drivers	Engine	Laps	Time/Retired
1	**GTP**	**01**	**(United States) Cadillac Racing**	**(France) Sébastien Bourdais (New Zealand) Scott Dixon (Netherlands) Renger van der Zande**	**Cadillac V-Series.R**	**443**	**10:00:36.290‡**
1	**GTP**	**01**	**(United States) Cadillac Racing**	**(France) Sébastien Bourdais (New Zealand) Scott Dixon (Netherlands) Renger van der Zande**	**Cadillac LMC55R 5.5 L V8**	**443**	**10:00:36.290‡**
2	GTP	6	(Germany) Porsche Penske Motorsport	(France) Kévin Estre (France) Mathieu Jaminet (United Kingdom) Nick Tandy	Porsche 963	443	+2.948
2	GTP	6	(Germany) Porsche Penske Motorsport	(France) Kévin Estre (France) Mathieu Jaminet (United Kingdom) Nick Tandy	Porsche 9RD 4.6 L twin-turbo V8	443	+2.948
3	GTP	7	(Germany) Porsche Penske Motorsport	(United States) Dane Cameron (Australia) Matt Campbell (Brazil) Felipe Nasr	Porsche 963	443	+13.832
3	GTP	7	(Germany) Porsche Penske Motorsport	(United States) Dane Cameron (Australia) Matt Campbell (Brazil) Felipe Nasr	Porsche 9RD 4.6 L twin-turbo V8	443	+13.832
4	GTP	24	(United States) BMW M Team RLL	(Austria) Philipp Eng (Brazil) Augusto Farfus (Finland) Jesse Krohn	BMW M Hybrid V8	442	+1 Lap
4	GTP	24	(United States) BMW M Team RLL	(Austria) Philipp Eng (Brazil) Augusto Farfus (Finland) Jesse Krohn	BMW P66/3 4.0 L twin-turbo V8	442	+1 Lap
5	GTP	31	(United States) Whelen Cadillac Racing	(United Kingdom) Jack Aitken (United Kingdom) Tom Blomqvist (Brazil) Pipo Derani	Cadillac V-Series.R	442	+1 Lap
5	GTP	31	(United States) Whelen Cadillac Racing	(United Kingdom) Jack Aitken (United Kingdom) Tom Blomqvist (Brazil) Pipo Derani	Cadillac LMC55R 5.5 L V8	442	+1 Lap
6	GTP	5	(Germany) Proton Competition Mustang Sampling	(Italy) Gianmaria Bruni (Belgium) Alessio Picariello (Netherlands) Bent Viscaal	Porsche 963	441	+2 Laps
6	GTP	5	(Germany) Proton Competition Mustang Sampling	(Italy) Gianmaria Bruni (Belgium) Alessio Picariello (Netherlands) Bent Viscaal	Porsche 9RD 4.6 L twin-turbo V8	441	+2 Laps
7	GTP	40	(United States) Wayne Taylor Racing with Andretti	(Switzerland) Louis Delétraz (United States) Colton Herta (United States) Jordan Taylor	Acura ARX-06	440	+3 Laps
7	GTP	40	(United States) Wayne Taylor Racing with Andretti	(Switzerland) Louis Delétraz (United States) Colton Herta (United States) Jordan Taylor	Acura AR24e 2.4 L twin-turbo V6	440	+3 Laps
8	**LMP2**	**11**	**(France) TDS Racing**	**(Denmark) Mikkel Jensen (New Zealand) Hunter McElrea (United States) Steven Thomas**	**Oreca 07**	**435**	**+8 Laps‡**
8	**LMP2**	**11**	**(France) TDS Racing**	**(Denmark) Mikkel Jensen (New Zealand) Hunter McElrea (United States) Steven Thomas**	**Gibson GK428 4.2 L V8**	**435**	**+8 Laps‡**
9	LMP2	74	(United States) Riley	(Australia) Josh Burdon (Brazil) Felipe Fraga (United States) Gar Robinson	Oreca 07	435	+8 Laps
9	LMP2	74	(United States) Riley	(Australia) Josh Burdon (Brazil) Felipe Fraga (United States) Gar Robinson	Gibson GK428 4.2 L V8	435	+8 Laps
10	LMP2	18	(United States) Era Motorsport	(United Kingdom) Ryan Dalziel (United States) Dwight Merriman (United States) Connor Zilisch	Oreca 07	435	+8 Laps
10	LMP2	18	(United States) Era Motorsport	(United Kingdom) Ryan Dalziel (United States) Dwight Merriman (United States) Connor Zilisch	Gibson GK428 4.2 L V8	435	+8 Laps
11	LMP2	52	(Poland) Inter Europol by PR1/Mathiasen Motorsports	(United States) Nick Boulle (France) Tom Dillmann (Poland) Jakub Śmiechowski	Oreca 07	435	+8 Laps
11	LMP2	52	(Poland) Inter Europol by PR1/Mathiasen Motorsports	(United States) Nick Boulle (France) Tom Dillmann (Poland) Jakub Śmiechowski	Gibson GK428 4.2 L V8	435	+8 Laps
12	LMP2	8	(United States) Tower Motorsports	(Mexico) Sebastián Álvarez (Canada) John Farano (Denmark) Frederik Vesti	Oreca 07	435	+8 Laps
12	LMP2	8	(United States) Tower Motorsports	(Mexico) Sebastián Álvarez (Canada) John Farano (Denmark) Frederik Vesti	Gibson GK428 4.2 L V8	435	+8 Laps
13	LMP2	88	(Italy) Richard Mille AF Corse	(Denmark) Nicklas Nielsen (Argentina) Luis Pérez Companc (France) Lilou Wadoux	Oreca 07	434	+9 Laps
13	LMP2	88	(Italy) Richard Mille AF Corse	(Denmark) Nicklas Nielsen (Argentina) Luis Pérez Companc (France) Lilou Wadoux	Gibson GK428 4.2 L V8	434	+9 Laps
14	LMP2	99	(United States) AO Racing	(Australia) Matthew Brabham (France) Paul-Loup Chatin (United States) P. J. Hyett	Oreca 07	432	+11 Laps
14	LMP2	99	(United States) AO Racing	(Australia) Matthew Brabham (France) Paul-Loup Chatin (United States) P. J. Hyett	Gibson GK428 4.2 L V8	432	+11 Laps
15	GTP	63	(Italy) Lamborghini – Iron Lynx	(Italy) Matteo Cairoli (Italy) Andrea Caldarelli (France) Romain Grosjean	Lamborghini SC63	430	+13 Laps
15	GTP	63	(Italy) Lamborghini – Iron Lynx	(Italy) Matteo Cairoli (Italy) Andrea Caldarelli (France) Romain Grosjean	Lamborghini 3.8 L twin-turbo V8	430	+13 Laps
16	LMP2	20	(Denmark) MDK by High Class Racing	(Denmark) Dennis Andersen (United States) Scott Huffaker (United States) Seth Lucas	Oreca 07	417	+26 Laps
16	LMP2	20	(Denmark) MDK by High Class Racing	(Denmark) Dennis Andersen (United States) Scott Huffaker (United States) Seth Lucas	Gibson GK428 4.2 L V8	417	+26 Laps
17	**GTD Pro**	**19**	**(Italy) Iron Lynx**	**(Italy) Mirko Bortolotti (South Africa) Jordan Pepper (France) Franck Perera**	**Lamborghini Huracán GT3 Evo 2**	**413**	**+30 Laps‡**
17	**GTD Pro**	**19**	**(Italy) Iron Lynx**	**(Italy) Mirko Bortolotti (South Africa) Jordan Pepper (France) Franck Perera**	**Lamborghini DGF 5.2 L V10**	**413**	**+30 Laps‡**
18	GTD Pro	62	(United States) Risi Competizione	(Italy) Alessandro Pier Guidi (Italy) Davide Rigon (Brazil) Daniel Serra	Ferrari 296 GT3	413	+30 Laps
18	GTD Pro	62	(United States) Risi Competizione	(Italy) Alessandro Pier Guidi (Italy) Davide Rigon (Brazil) Daniel Serra	Ferrari F163CE 3.0 L Turbo V6	413	+30 Laps
19	GTD Pro	23	(United States) Heart of Racing Team	(Canada) Roman De Angelis (United Kingdom) Ross Gunn (Spain) Alex Riberas	Aston Martin Vantage AMR GT3 Evo	413	+30 Laps
19	GTD Pro	23	(United States) Heart of Racing Team	(Canada) Roman De Angelis (United Kingdom) Ross Gunn (Spain) Alex Riberas	Aston Martin M177 4.0 L Turbo V8	413	+30 Laps
20	GTD Pro	027	(United States) Heart of Racing Team	(Germany) Mario Farnbacher (Canada) Zacharie Robichon (Denmark) Marco Sørensen	Aston Martin Vantage AMR GT3 Evo	413	+30 Laps
20	GTD Pro	027	(United States) Heart of Racing Team	(Germany) Mario Farnbacher (Canada) Zacharie Robichon (Denmark) Marco Sørensen	Aston Martin M177 4.0 L Turbo V8	413	+30 Laps
21	GTD Pro	3	(United States) Corvette Racing by Pratt Miller Motorsports	(Spain) Antonio García (Spain) Daniel Juncadella (United Kingdom) Alexander Sims	Chevrolet Corvette Z06 GT3.R	413	+30 Laps
21	GTD Pro	3	(United States) Corvette Racing by Pratt Miller Motorsports	(Spain) Antonio García (Spain) Daniel Juncadella (United Kingdom) Alexander Sims	Chevrolet LT6 5.5 L V8	413	+30 Laps
22	GTD Pro	65	(Canada) Ford Multimatic Motorsports	(United States) Joey Hand (Germany) Dirk Müller (Belgium) Frédéric Vervisch	Ford Mustang GT3	412	+31 Laps
22	GTD Pro	65	(Canada) Ford Multimatic Motorsports	(United States) Joey Hand (Germany) Dirk Müller (Belgium) Frédéric Vervisch	Ford Coyote 5.4 L V8	412	+31 Laps
23	GTD Pro	1	(United States) Paul Miller Racing	(United States) Bryan Sellers (United States) Madison Snow (United States) Neil Verhagen	BMW M4 GT3	412	+31 Laps
23	GTD Pro	1	(United States) Paul Miller Racing	(United States) Bryan Sellers (United States) Madison Snow (United States) Neil Verhagen	BMW P58 3.0 L Turbo I6	412	+31 Laps
24	GTD Pro	64	(Canada) Ford Multimatic Motorsports	(Germany) Christopher Mies (Germany) Mike Rockenfeller (United Kingdom) Harry Tincknell	Ford Mustang GT3	411	+32 Laps
24	GTD Pro	64	(Canada) Ford Multimatic Motorsports	(Germany) Christopher Mies (Germany) Mike Rockenfeller (United Kingdom) Harry Tincknell	Ford Coyote 5.4 L V8	411	+32 Laps
25	**GTD**	**34**	**(United States) Conquest Racing**	**(Spain) Albert Costa (United States) Manny Franco (Monaco) Cédric Sbirrazzuoli**	**Ferrari 296 GT3**	**411**	**+32 Laps‡**
25	**GTD**	**34**	**(United States) Conquest Racing**	**(Spain) Albert Costa (United States) Manny Franco (Monaco) Cédric Sbirrazzuoli**	**Ferrari F163CE 3.0 L Turbo V6**	**411**	**+32 Laps‡**
26	GTD	78	(United States) Forte Racing	(Canada) Devlin DeFrancesco (Canada) Misha Goikhberg (Italy) Loris Spinelli	Lamborghini Huracán GT3 Evo 2	411	+32 Laps
26	GTD	78	(United States) Forte Racing	(Canada) Devlin DeFrancesco (Canada) Misha Goikhberg (Italy) Loris Spinelli	Lamborghini DGF 5.2 L V10	411	+32 Laps
27	GTD	12	(United States) Vasser Sullivan	(United States) Frankie Montecalvo (United States) Aaron Telitz (Canada) Parker Thompson	Lexus RC F GT3	410	+33 Laps
27	GTD	12	(United States) Vasser Sullivan	(United States) Frankie Montecalvo (United States) Aaron Telitz (Canada) Parker Thompson	Toyota 2UR-GSE 5.4 L V8	410	+33 Laps
28	GTD	023	(United States) Triarsi Competizione	(Italy) Alessio Rovera (United States) Charlie Scardina (United States) Onofrio Triarsi	Ferrari 296 GT3	410	+33 Laps
28	GTD	023	(United States) Triarsi Competizione	(Italy) Alessio Rovera (United States) Charlie Scardina (United States) Onofrio Triarsi	Ferrari F163CE 3.0 L Turbo V6	410	+33 Laps
29	GTD	45	(United States) Wayne Taylor Racing with Andretti	(United States) Graham Doyle (Costa Rica) Danny Formal (Canada) Kyle Marcelli	Lamborghini Huracán GT3 Evo 2	410	+33 Laps
29	GTD	45	(United States) Wayne Taylor Racing with Andretti	(United States) Graham Doyle (Costa Rica) Danny Formal (Canada) Kyle Marcelli	Lamborghini DGF 5.2 L V10	410	+33 Laps
30	GTD	21	(Italy) AF Corse	(France) François Heriau (United Kingdom) Simon Mann (Spain) Miguel Molina	Ferrari 296 GT3	410	+33 Laps
30	GTD	21	(Italy) AF Corse	(France) François Heriau (United Kingdom) Simon Mann (Spain) Miguel Molina	Ferrari F163CE 3.0 L Turbo V6	410	+33 Laps
31	GTD	70	(United Kingdom) Inception Racing	(United States) Brendan Iribe (United Kingdom) Ollie Millroy (Denmark) Frederik Schandorff	Ferrari 296 GT3	410	+33 Laps
31	GTD	70	(United Kingdom) Inception Racing	(United States) Brendan Iribe (United Kingdom) Ollie Millroy (Denmark) Frederik Schandorff	Ferrari F163CE 3.0 L Turbo V6	410	+33 Laps
32	GTD	57	(United States) Winward Racing	(Netherlands) Indy Dontje (Switzerland) Philip Ellis (United States) Russell Ward	Mercedes-AMG GT3 Evo	410	+33 Laps
32	GTD	57	(United States) Winward Racing	(Netherlands) Indy Dontje (Switzerland) Philip Ellis (United States) Russell Ward	Mercedes-AMG M159 6.2 L V8	410	+33 Laps
33	GTD	96	(United States) Turner Motorsport	(United States) Robby Foley (United States) Patrick Gallagher (United States) Jake Walker	BMW M4 GT3	409	+34 Laps
33	GTD	96	(United States) Turner Motorsport	(United States) Robby Foley (United States) Patrick Gallagher (United States) Jake Walker	BMW P58 3.0 L Turbo I6	409	+34 Laps
34	GTD Pro	9	(Canada) Pfaff Motorsports	(Canada) James Hinchcliffe (United Kingdom) Oliver Jarvis (Germany) Marvin Kirchhöfer	McLaren 720S GT3 Evo	408	+35 Laps
34	GTD Pro	9	(Canada) Pfaff Motorsports	(Canada) James Hinchcliffe (United Kingdom) Oliver Jarvis (Germany) Marvin Kirchhöfer	McLaren M840T 4.0 L Turbo V8	408	+35 Laps
35	GTD	80	(United States) Lone Star Racing	(Angola) Rui Andrade (Australia) Scott Andrews (Turkey) Salih Yoluç	Mercedes-AMG GT3 Evo	408	+35 Laps
35	GTD	80	(United States) Lone Star Racing	(Angola) Rui Andrade (Australia) Scott Andrews (Turkey) Salih Yoluç	Mercedes-AMG M159 6.2 L V8	408	+35 Laps
36	GTD Pro	82	(United States) DragonSpeed	(Monaco) Vincent Abril (France) Thomas Neubauer (Finland) Toni Vilander	Ferrari 296 GT3	408	+35 Laps
36	GTD Pro	82	(United States) DragonSpeed	(Monaco) Vincent Abril (France) Thomas Neubauer (Finland) Toni Vilander	Ferrari F163CE 3.0 L Turbo V6	408	+35 Laps
37	GTD Pro	77	(United States) AO Racing	(France) Julien Andlauer (Denmark) Michael Christensen (Germany) Laurin Heinrich	Porsche 911 GT3 R (992)	408	+35 Laps
37	GTD Pro	77	(United States) AO Racing	(France) Julien Andlauer (Denmark) Michael Christensen (Germany) Laurin Heinrich	Porsche M97/80 4.2 L Flat-6	408	+35 Laps
38	GTD	13	(Canada) AWA	(United Kingdom) Matt Bell (Canada) Orey Fidani (Germany) Lars Kern	Chevrolet Corvette Z06 GT3.R	407	+36 Laps
38	GTD	13	(Canada) AWA	(United Kingdom) Matt Bell (Canada) Orey Fidani (Germany) Lars Kern	Chevrolet LT6 5.5 L V8	407	+36 Laps
39	GTD	66	(United States) Gradient Racing	(Colombia) Tatiana Calderón (United Kingdom) Stevan McAleer (United States) Sheena Monk	Acura NSX GT3 Evo22	406	+37 Laps
39	GTD	66	(United States) Gradient Racing	(Colombia) Tatiana Calderón (United Kingdom) Stevan McAleer (United States) Sheena Monk	Acura JNC1 3.5 L Turbo V6	406	+37 Laps
40 DNF	GTP	10	(United States) Wayne Taylor Racing with Andretti	(Portugal) Filipe Albuquerque (New Zealand) Brendon Hartley (United States) Ricky Taylor	Acura ARX-06	405	Accident
40 DNF	GTP	10	(United States) Wayne Taylor Racing with Andretti	(Portugal) Filipe Albuquerque (New Zealand) Brendon Hartley (United States) Ricky Taylor	Acura AR24e 2.4 L twin-turbo V6	405	Accident
41	GTD	83	(Italy) Iron Dames	(Belgium) Sarah Bovy (Switzerland) Rahel Frey (Denmark) Michelle Gatting	Lamborghini Huracán GT3 Evo 2	404	+39 Laps
41	GTD	83	(Italy) Iron Dames	(Belgium) Sarah Bovy (Switzerland) Rahel Frey (Denmark) Michelle Gatting	Lamborghini DGF 5.2 L V10	404	+39 Laps
42	GTD	47	(Italy) Cetilar Racing	(Italy) Antonio Fuoco (Italy) Roberto Lacorte (Italy) Giorgio Sernagiotto	Ferrari 296 GT3	402	+41 Laps
42	GTD	47	(Italy) Cetilar Racing	(Italy) Antonio Fuoco (Italy) Roberto Lacorte (Italy) Giorgio Sernagiotto	Ferrari F163CE 3.0 L Turbo V6	402	+41 Laps
43 DNF	GTD	86	(United States) MDK Motorsports	(Austria) Klaus Bachler (Denmark) Anders Fjordbach (China) Kerong Li	Porsche 911 GT3 R (992)	397	Mechanical
43 DNF	GTD	86	(United States) MDK Motorsports	(Austria) Klaus Bachler (Denmark) Anders Fjordbach (China) Kerong Li	Porsche M97/80 4.2 L Flat-6	397	Mechanical
44 DNF	GTD	120	(United States) Wright Motorsports	(United States) Adam Adelson (Belgium) Jan Heylen (United States) Elliott Skeer	Porsche 911 GT3 R (992)	373	Accident
44 DNF	GTD	120	(United States) Wright Motorsports	(United States) Adam Adelson (Belgium) Jan Heylen (United States) Elliott Skeer	Porsche M97/80 4.2 L Flat-6	373	Accident
45 DNF	GTD	55	(Germany) Proton Competition	(United States) Ryan Hardwick (Italy) Giammarco Levorato (United States) Corey Lewis	Ford Mustang GT3	372	Accident
45 DNF	GTD	55	(Germany) Proton Competition	(United States) Ryan Hardwick (Italy) Giammarco Levorato (United States) Corey Lewis	Ford Coyote 5.4 L V8	372	Accident
46	GTD Pro	4	(United States) Corvette Racing by Pratt Miller Motorsports	(New Zealand) Earl Bamber (Netherlands) Nicky Catsburg (United States) Tommy Milner	Chevrolet Corvette Z06 GT3.R	357	+86 Laps
46	GTD Pro	4	(United States) Corvette Racing by Pratt Miller Motorsports	(New Zealand) Earl Bamber (Netherlands) Nicky Catsburg (United States) Tommy Milner	Chevrolet LT6 5.5 L V8	357	+86 Laps
47 DNF	LMP2	22	(United States) United Autosports USA	(United Kingdom) Paul di Resta (United States) Bijoy Garg (United States) Dan Goldburg	Oreca 07	248	Accident damage
47 DNF	LMP2	22	(United States) United Autosports USA	(United Kingdom) Paul di Resta (United States) Bijoy Garg (United States) Dan Goldburg	Gibson GK428 4.2 L V8	248	Accident damage
48 DNF	GTP	25	(United States) BMW M Team RLL	(United States) Connor De Phillippi (Belgium) Maxime Martin (United Kingdom) Nick Yelloly	BMW M Hybrid V8	170	Engine
48 DNF	GTP	25	(United States) BMW M Team RLL	(United States) Connor De Phillippi (Belgium) Maxime Martin (United Kingdom) Nick Yelloly	BMW P66/3 4.0 L twin-turbo V8	170	Engine
49 DNF	GTP	85	(United States) JDC–Miller MotorSports	(United Kingdom) Phil Hanson (Netherlands) Tijmen van der Helm (United Kingdom) Richard Westbrook	Porsche 963	160	Power steering
49 DNF	GTP	85	(United States) JDC–Miller MotorSports	(United Kingdom) Phil Hanson (Netherlands) Tijmen van der Helm (United Kingdom) Richard Westbrook	Porsche 9RD 4.6 L twin-turbo V8	160	Power steering
50 DNF	LMP2	2	(United States) United Autosports USA	(United Kingdom) Ben Hanley (United States) Ben Keating (Chile) Nico Pino	Oreca 07	116	Accident
50 DNF	LMP2	2	(United States) United Autosports USA	(United Kingdom) Ben Hanley (United States) Ben Keating (Chile) Nico Pino	Gibson GK428 4.2 L V8	116	Accident
51 DNF	GTD Pro	14	(United States) Vasser Sullivan	(United Kingdom) Ben Barnicoat (United Kingdom) Jack Hawksworth (United States) Kyle Kirkwood	Lexus RC F GT3	113	Mechanical
51 DNF	GTD Pro	14	(United States) Vasser Sullivan	(United Kingdom) Ben Barnicoat (United Kingdom) Jack Hawksworth (United States) Kyle Kirkwood	Toyota 2UR-GSE 5.4 L V8	113	Mechanical
52 DNF	GTD	44	(United States) Magnus Racing	(United States) Andy Lally (United States) John Potter (United States) Spencer Pumpelly	Aston Martin Vantage AMR GT3 Evo	14	Half-shaft
52 DNF	GTD	44	(United States) Magnus Racing	(United States) Andy Lally (United States) John Potter (United States) Spencer Pumpelly	Aston Martin M177 4.0 L Turbo V8	14	Half-shaft
53^{1}	GTD	32	(United States) Korthoff/Preston Motorsports	(Canada) Mikaël Grenier (United States) Kenton Koch (United States) Mike Skeen	Mercedes-AMG GT3 Evo	410	+33 Laps
53^{1}	GTD	32	(United States) Korthoff/Preston Motorsports	(Canada) Mikaël Grenier (United States) Kenton Koch (United States) Mike Skeen	Mercedes-AMG M159 6.2 L V8	410	+33 Laps

- ^{1} The No. 32 Korthoff/Preston Motorsports entry was moved to the rear of the GTD class for violating maximum limits of tire cambers and pressures.

== Standings after the race ==
GTP Drivers' Championship standings
Pos.	+/–	Driver	Points
1		(United States) Dane Cameron (Brazil) Felipe Nasr	2982
2		(France) Mathieu Jaminet (United Kingdom) Nick Tandy	2869
3		(France) Sébastien Bourdais (Netherlands) Renger van der Zande	2864
4		(United Kingdom) Jack Aitken (Brazil) Pipo Derani	2687
5		(Switzerland) Louis Delétraz (United States) Jordan Taylor	2603

LMP2 Drivers' Championship standings
Pos.	+/–	Driver	Points
1		(United States) Nick Boulle (France) Tom Dillmann	2227
2		(Brazil) Felipe Fraga (United States) Gar Robinson	2166
3		(United Kingdom) Ryan Dalziel	2118
4		(United States) Steven Thomas	2104
5		(United Kingdom) Ben Hanley (United States) Ben Keating	1962

GTD Pro Drivers' Championship standings
Pos.	+/–	Driver	Points
1		(Germany) Laurin Heinrich	3122
2		(United Kingdom) Ross Gunn	3118
3	2	(Spain) Antonio García (United Kingdom) Alexander Sims	2934
4	1	(United States) Bryan Sellers (United States) Madison Snow	2929
5	1	(United Kingdom) Ben Barnicoat (United Kingdom) Jack Hawksworth	2859

GTD Drivers' Championship standings
Pos.	+/–	Driver	Points
1		(Switzerland) Philip Ellis (United States) Russell Ward	3266
2		(United States) Robby Foley (United States) Patrick Gallagher	3036
3		(Canada) Mikaël Grenier	2661
4	2	(Spain) Albert Costa (United States) Manny Franco	2577
5		(Canada) Misha Goikhberg (Italy) Loris Spinelli	2554

- Note: Only the top five positions are included for all sets of standings.

GTP Teams' Championship standings
Pos.	+/–	Team	Points
1		#7 Porsche Penske Motorsport	2982
2		#6 Porsche Penske Motorsport	2869
3		#01 Cadillac Racing	2864
4		#31 Whelen Cadillac Racing	2687
5		#40 Wayne Taylor Racing with Andretti	2603

LMP2 Teams' Championship standings
Pos.	+/–	Team	Points
1		#52 Inter Europol by PR1/Mathiasen Motorsports	2227
2		#74 Riley	2166
3		#18 Era Motorsport	2118
4		#11 TDS Racing	2104
5		#2 United Autosports USA	1962

GTD Pro Teams' Championship standings
Pos.	+/–	Team	Points
1		#77 AO Racing	3122
2		#23 Heart of Racing Team	3118
3	2	#3 Corvette Racing by Pratt Miller Motorsports	2934
4	1	#1 Paul Miller Racing	2929
5	1	#14 Vasser Sullivan	2859

GTD Teams' Championship standings
Pos.	+/–	Team	Points
1		#57 Winward Racing	3266
2		#96 Turner Motorsport	3036
3		#32 Korthoff/Preston Motorsports	2661
4	1	#34 Conquest Racing	2577
5	1	#78 Forte Racing	2554

- Note: Only the top five positions are included for all sets of standings.

GTP Manufacturers' Championship standings
Pos.	+/–	Manufacturer	Points
1		(Germany) Porsche	3257
2		(United States) Cadillac	3166
3		(Japan) Acura	3056
4		(Germany) BMW	2896
5		(Italy) Lamborghini	1144

GTD Pro Manufacturers' Championship standings
Pos.	+/–	Manufacturer	Points
1		(Germany) Porsche	3215
2		(United Kingdom) Aston Martin	3158
3		(United States) Chevrolet	3073
4		(Japan) Lexus	2973
5		(United States) Ford	2969

GTD Manufacturers' Championship standings
Pos.	+/–	Manufacturer	Points
1		(Germany) Mercedes-AMG	3532
2	1	(Italy) Lamborghini	2958
3	1	(Germany) BMW	2938
4		(Germany) Porsche	2862
5	1	(Japan) Lexus	2829

- Note: Only the top five positions are included for all sets of standings.
- Note: Bold names include the Drivers', Teams', and Manufactures' Champion respectively.

IMSA SportsCar Championship
Previous race: IMSA Battle on the Bricks	2024 season	Next race: None
