= Ross Gunn (racing driver) =

British racing driver (born 1997)

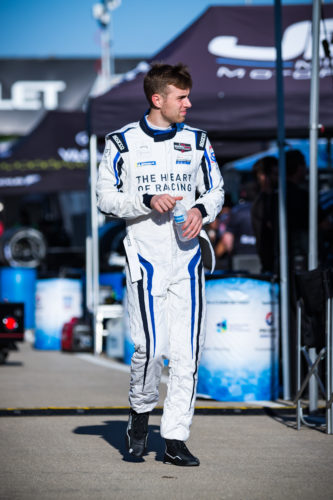
- Gunn in 2021
- Nationality: British
- Born: Ross Patrick Gunn; 1 January 1997 (age 29) High Wycombe, England

IMSA SportsCar Championship career
- Debut season: 2020
- Current team: Heart of Racing Team
- Categorisation: FIA Silver (until 2019); FIA Gold (2020–2023); FIA Platinum (2024–)
- Car number: 23
- Former teams: Aston Martin Racing
- Starts: 61
- Wins: 8
- Podiums: 19
- Poles: 6
- Fastest laps: 5

Previous series
- 2015–2016, '19: British GT Championship

Championship titles
- 2015: British GT Championship – GT4

Ross Patrick Gunn (born 1 January 1997) is a British professional racing driver, and Aston Martin Racing works driver who currently competes in the IMSA SportsCar Championship and the FIA World Endurance Championship for The Heart of Racing in the Aston Martin Valkyrie AMR-LMH.

== Career ==
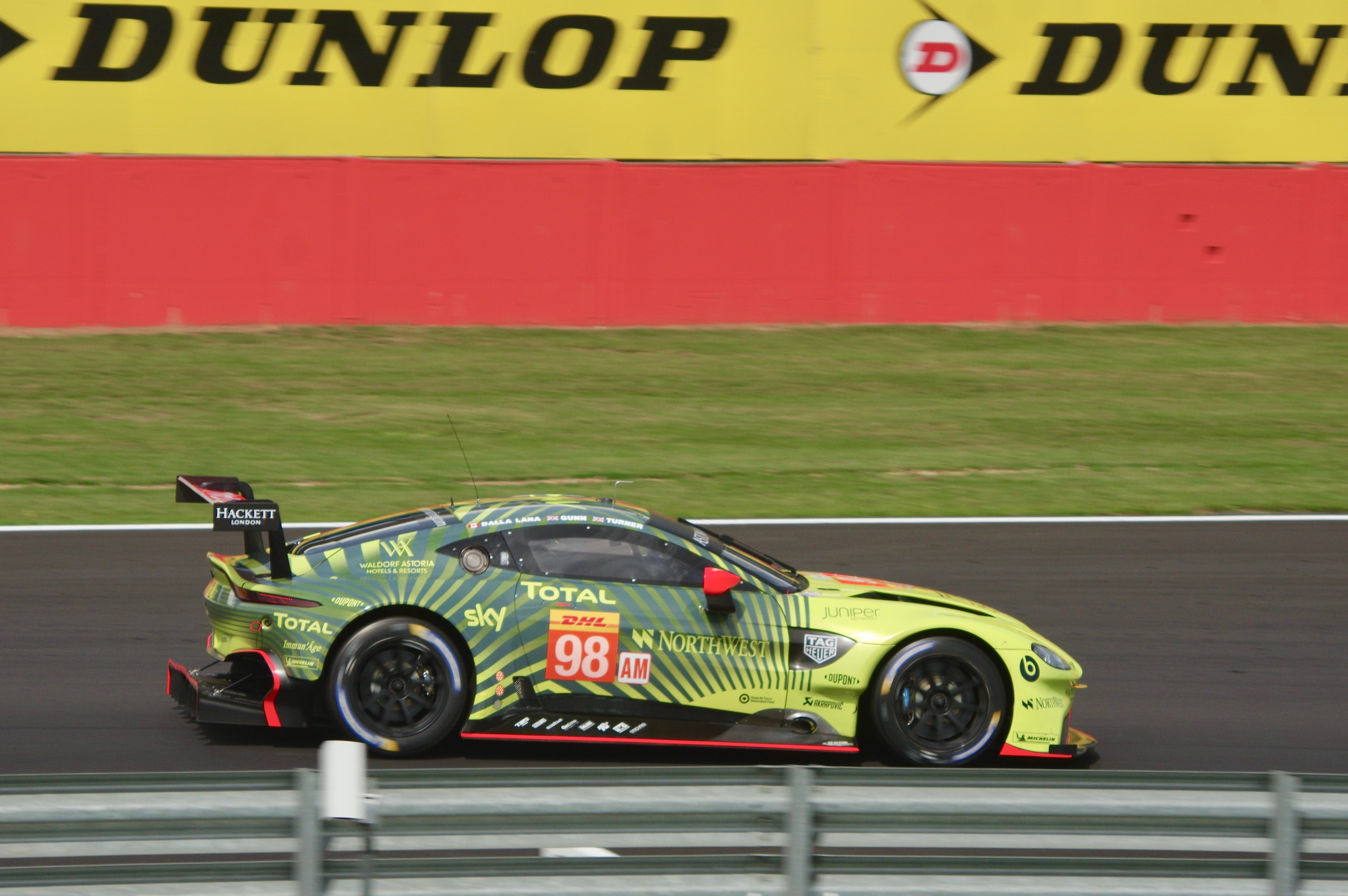
Gunn competing for Aston Martin Racing at Silverstone in 2019

Gunn began his racing career in karting at the age of eight, winning the British Super One MiniMax Championship in 2011 before taking the British Super One Junior Rotax Championship title the following year. In 2013, he graduated to single-seater formula competition, competing in the BRDC Formula 4 series. However, he was forced to miss the final two rounds of the season due to a lack of funding. Scoring two race victories, Gunn finished 11th in the championship.

As a result of his lack of funding, Gunn wouldn't race competitively in 2014, but would return in 2015 by taking part in the Aston Martin Evolution Academy. That season, Gunn and co-driver Jamie Chadwick secured the British GT Championship GT4-class title, driving for Beechdean-AMR. In December, Gunn was announced as the winner of the Aston Martin Evolution Academy, which lead to his signing as an Aston Martin factory driver for 2016. After a year of GT3 competition in 2016, Gunn stepped up to the GTE ranks with Beechdean-AMR, competing in the 2017 European Le Mans Series. In 2019, Gunn secured his first full-time FIA World Endurance Championship ride with Aston Martin Racing's GTE Am class entry, driving alongside Paul Dalla Lana and Darren Turner. The team would collect four podium finishes in eight races, finishing seventh in the championship.

2021 saw Gunn join Aston Martin customer team Heart of Racing in the IMSA SportsCar Championship. Following the 12 Hours of Sebring, Gunn was confirmed as the full-season partner for Roman de Angelis, with team boss Ian James set to step back to the series' endurance events at Watkins Glen and Road Atlanta. That season, the duo claimed the WeatherTech Sprint Cup title, awarded to the highest performing team throughout the season's sprint events. Gunn was victorious in the final race of the season at Petit Le Mans, held at Road Atlanta.

2022 saw Gunn join the team's GTD Pro class entry, paired for the season with Alex Riberas. After a difficult start to the season, featuring retirements at both Daytona and Sebring, the duo scored class victories at Long Beach and Watkins Glen, rebounding to finish fourth in the GTD Pro championship. Gunn returned to the team for the following season.

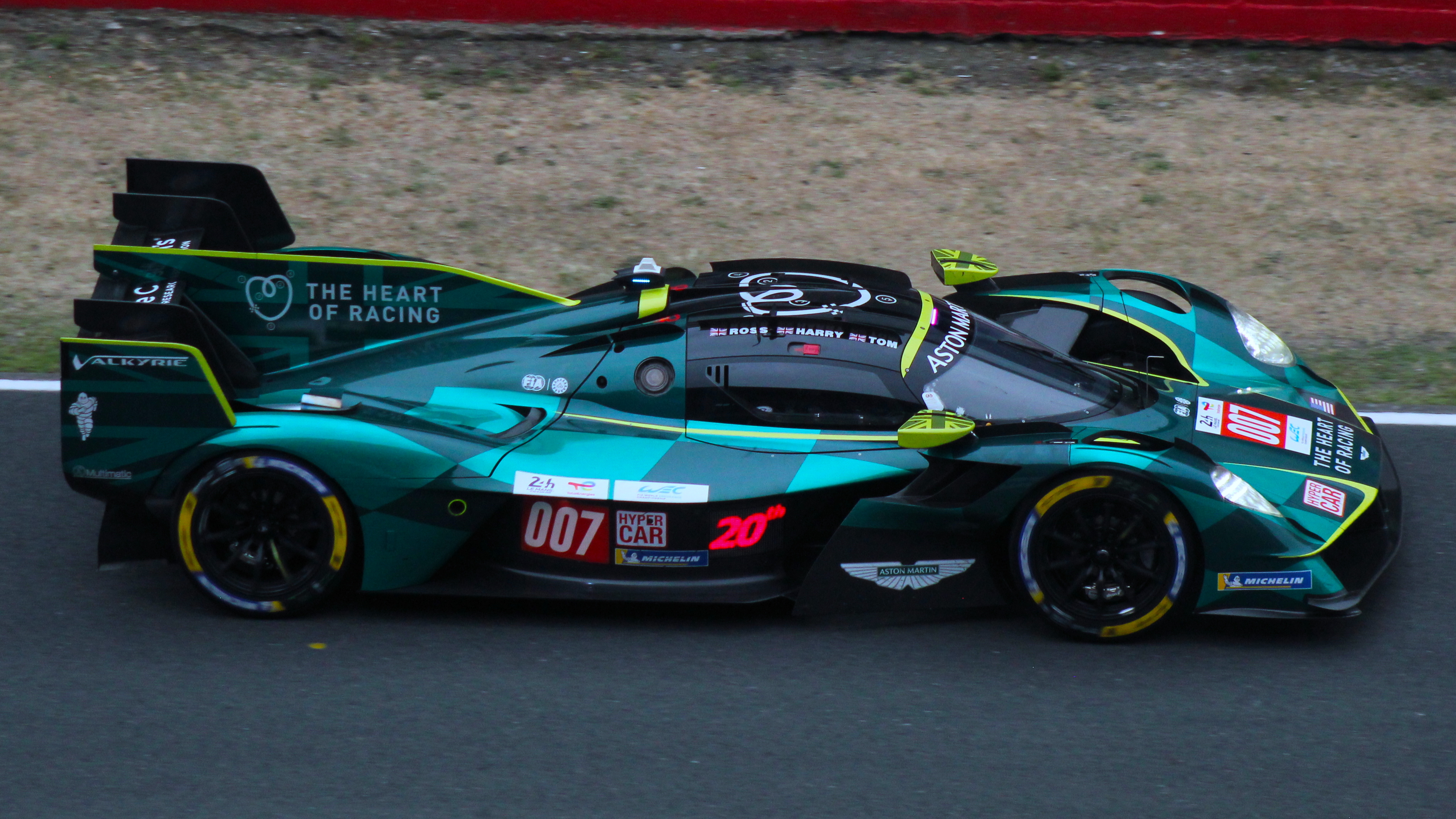
Gunn's No. 007 car at the 2025 24 Hours of Le Mans

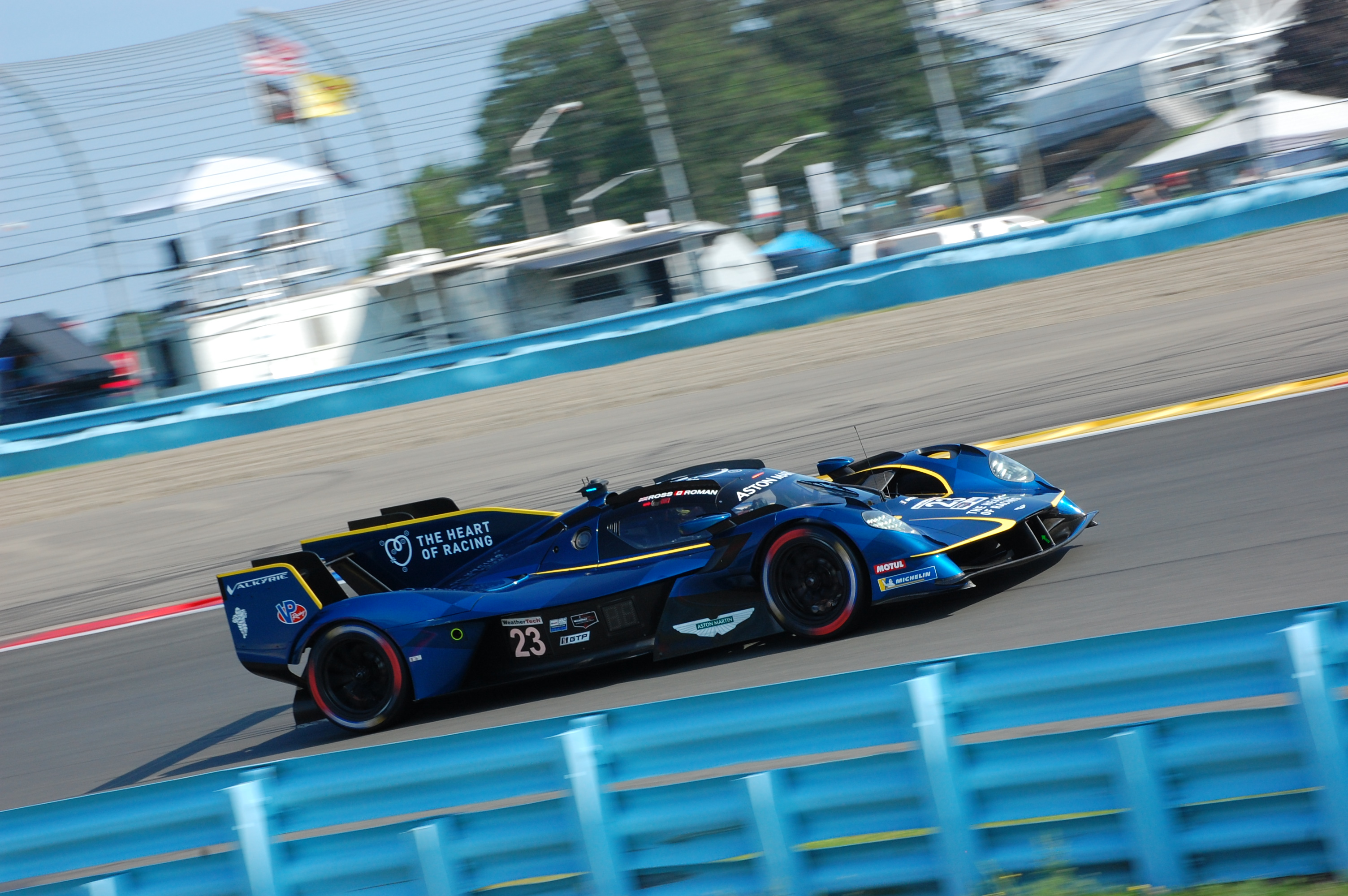
Gunn at Watkins Glen in 2025

In 2023, Gunn returned to the British GT Championship, reuniting with Andrew Howard and the Beechdean AMR team. He would make it three full-time programs for 2023 following the announcement of TRG's GT World Challenge America entry, where he partnered with Derek DeBoer. As the team's factory representative, Gunn primarily played the role of initially bringing the team to terms with the Aston Martin Vantage AMR GT3 and coaching DeBoer. Furthermore, he cited his IMSA factory drive as taking the highest priority, as his three-pronged program encountered several conflicting race dates. One of those conflicting dates included the round at NOLA Motorsports Park, during which Gunn was conducting simulator work with the Mercedes-AMG Formula One team.

== Racing record ==
=== Career summary ===
Season	Series	Team	Races	Wins	Poles	F/Laps	Podiums	Points	Position
2013	BRDC Formula 4 Championship	Motionsport	18	2	0	1	2	242	11th
2015	British GT Championship – GT4	Beechdean-AMR	9	2	1	1	6	164.5	**1st**
2016	British GT Championship – GT4	Beechdean-AMR	3	1	0	0	2	55	10th
2016	British GT Championship – GT3	Beechdean-AMR	5	0	0	0	1	48.5	10th
2017	European Le Mans Series – LMGTE	Beechdean-AMR	5	0	0	0	3	63	7th
2017	24 Hours of Le Mans – LMGTE Am	Beechdean-AMR	1	0	0	0	0	N/A	4th
2017	24H Series – A6	De La Torre Racing	1	0	0	0	0	0	NC
2018	Blancpain GT Series Endurance Cup	Oman Racing with TF Sport	1	0	0	0	0	0	NC
2018	VLN Series	AMR Performance Centre	2	0	0	0	0	6.67	?
2019	Le Mans Cup – GT3	Beechdean-AMR	7	0	1	3	3	80	**3rd**
2019	British GT Championship – GT3	Beechdean-AMR	1	0	0	0	0	12	19th
2019	China GT Championship – GT4	?	3	1	?	?	2	67	16th
2019	Blancpain GT Series Endurance Cup	Garage 59	1	0	0	0	0	0	NC
2019	Michelin Pilot Challenge – GS	Automatic Racing AMR	1	0	0	1	0	25	61st
2019–20	FIA World Endurance Championship – LMGTE Am	Aston Martin Racing	8	0	1	2	4	100.5	7th
2020	24 Hours of Le Mans – LMGTE Am	Aston Martin Racing	1	0	0	0	0	N/A	8th
2020	IMSA SportsCar Championship – GTD	Aston Martin Racing	1	0	0	0	0	14	58th
2020	European Le Mans Series – LMGTE	Aston Martin Racing	1	0	0	0	0	0	NC
2020	Asian Le Mans Series – GT	D'station Racing AMR	3	1	0	1	1	33	11th
2021	IMSA SportsCar Championship – GTD	Heart of Racing Team	13	3	1	1	6	3111	**3rd**
2021	British GT Championship – GT3	Beechdean AMR	1	0	0	0	0	18	12th
2021	GT World Challenge Europe Endurance Cup	Garage 59 AMR	1	0	0	1	1	22	13rd
2021	European Le Mans Series – LMGTE	TF Sport	6	0	2	1	0	26	17th
2021	Le Mans Cup – GT3	TF Sport	1	0	0	0	0	0	NC
2021	24 Hours of Le Mans – LMGTE Am	TF Sport	1	0	0	0	0	N/A	8th
2022	IMSA SportsCar Championship – GTD Pro	Heart of Racing Team	10	2	1	1	4	3103	4th
2022	IMSA SportsCar Championship – GTD	Heart of Racing Team	1	0	0	0	1	352	48th
2022	GT World Challenge Europe Endurance Cup	Heart of Racing with TF Sport	1	0	0	0	0	0	NC
2022–23	Middle East Trophy – GT3	Heart of Racing Team by SPS	1	0	0	0	0	N/A	NC
2023	Asian Le Mans Series – GT	TF Sport	0	0	0	0	0	0	NC
2023	British GT Championship – GT3	Beechdean Motorsport	8	0	1	0	2	103	8th
2023	GT World Challenge America – Pro/Am	TRG-AMR	4	0	0	0	0	36	15th
2023	IMSA SportsCar Championship – GTD Pro	Heart of Racing Team	11	2	2	3	3	3427	5th
2024	IMSA SportsCar Championship – GTD Pro	Heart of Racing Team	10	1	0	2	5	3118	2nd
2024	Intercontinental GT Challenge	Heart of Racing by SPS	2	0	0	0	0	4	24th
2024	GT World Challenge Europe Endurance Cup	Walkenhorst Racing	4	0	0	0	0	12	18th
2025	FIA World Endurance Championship – Hypercar	Aston Martin THOR Team	3	0	0	0	0	0	31st
2025	24 Hours of Le Mans – Hypercar	Aston Martin THOR Team	1	0	0	0	0	N/A	14th
2025	IMSA SportsCar Championship – GTP	Aston Martin THOR Team	8	0	0	0	1	2049	12th
2025	IMSA SportsCar Championship – GTD Pro	Heart of Racing Team	1	0	0	0	0	191	43rd
2025	GT World Challenge Europe Endurance Cup	Beechdean Motorsport	1	0	0	0	0	0	NC
2025	Intercontinental GT Challenge	Heart of Racing by SPS	1	0	0	0	0	6	28th
2026	IMSA SportsCar Championship - GTP	Aston Martin THOR Team	9	0	0	1	0	2242	14th
2026	FIA World Endurance Championship - Hypercar	Aston Martin THOR Team	1	0	0	0	0	8	22nd
2026	British GT Championship - GT3	Beechdean Motorsport	8	0	3	3	3	110	5th
2026	GT World Challenge Europe Endurance Cup	Comtoyou Racing	1	0	0	0	0	0	NC†

^{*} Season still in progress.

=== Complete British GT Championship results ===
(key) (Races in bold indicate pole position; races in italics indicate fastest lap)

Year	Entrant	Class	Car	1	2	3	4	5	6	7	8	9	Rank	Points
2015	Beechdean-AMR	GT4	Aston Martin V8 Vantage GT4	OUL; 1; 12	OUL; 2 DSQ	ROC; 1; 11	SIL; 1; 11	SPA; 1; 15	BRH; 1; 13	SNE; 1; 18	SNE; 2; 17	DON; 1 EX	1st	164.5
2016	Beechdean-AMR	GT3	Aston Martin V12 Vantage GT3	BRH; 1; 5	ROC; 1; 3	OUL; 1; 14	OUL; 2; 6	SIL; 1; 9	SPA; 1 Ret				10th	48.5
2016	Beechdean-AMR	GT4	Aston Martin V8 Vantage GT4							SNE; 1; 2	SNE; 2; 1	DON; 1; 6	12th	55
2019	Beechdean AMR	GT3	Aston Martin Vantage AMR GT3	OUL; 1	OUL; 2	SNE; 1	SNE; 2	SIL; 1	DON; 1; 6	SPA; 1	BRH; 1	DON; 1	19th	12
2021	Beechdean AMR	GT3	Aston Martin Vantage AMR GT3	BRH; 1	SIL; 1	DON; 1	SPA; 1; 4	SNE; 1	SNE; 2	OUL; 1	OUL; 2	DON; 1	12th	18
2023	Beechdean Motorsport	GT3	Aston Martin Vantage AMR GT3	OUL 1; 2	OUL 2; 5	**SIL 1**; 4	DON 1; 4	SNE 1; 17	**SNE 2**; 15	ALG 1	BRH 1; 2	**DON 1**; 6	8th	103
2026	Beechdean Motorsport	GT3	Aston Martin Vantage AMR GT3 Evo	SIL; 1; 6	**OUL**; **1**; 2	**OUL**; **2**; 2	SPA; 1; 11	SNE; 1; 6	**SNE**; **2**; 3	DON; 1; 4	BRH; 1; 5		5th	110

=== Complete European Le Mans Series results ===
(key) (Races in bold indicate pole position; races in italics indicate fastest lap)

Year	Entrant	Class	Chassis	Engine	1	2	3	4	5	6	Rank	Points
2017	Beechdean-AMR	LMGTE	Aston Martin Vantage GTE	Aston Martin AM05 4.5 L V8	SIL; 3	MNZ; 3	RBR; 6	LEC; 5	SPA; 3	ALG	7th	63
2020	Aston Martin Racing	LMGTE	Aston Martin Vantage AMR GTE	Aston Martin M177 4.0 L Turbo V8	LEC; Ret	SPA	LEC	MNZ	ALG		NC	0
2021	TF Sport	LMGTE	Aston Martin Vantage AMR GTE	Aston Martin M177 4.0 L Turbo V8	CAT; 8	RBR	**LEC**; 7	MNZ; 8	SPA; 8	**ALG**; 7	13th	26

=== Complete 24 Hours of Le Mans results ===
Year	Team	Co-Drivers	Car	Class	Laps	Pos.	Class Pos.
2017	(United Kingdom) Beechdean AMR	(United Kingdom) Andrew Howard (United Kingdom) Oliver Bryant	Aston Martin Vantage GTE	LMGTE Am	331	30th	4th
2020	(United Kingdom) Aston Martin Racing	(Canada) Paul Dalla Lana (Brazil) Augusto Farfus	Aston Martin Vantage AMR GTE	LMGTE Am	333	30th	8th
2021	(United Kingdom) TF Sport	(United Kingdom) Ollie Hancock (United Kingdom) John Hartshorne	Aston Martin Vantage AMR GTE	LMGTE Am	332	35th	8th
2025	(United States) Aston Martin THOR Team	(United Kingdom) Tom Gamble (United Kingdom) Harry Tincknell	Aston Martin Valkyrie	Hypercar	381	14th	14th
2026	(United States) Aston Martin THOR Team	(United Kingdom) Tom Gamble (United Kingdom) Harry Tincknell	Aston Martin Valkyrie	Hypercar	379	8th	8th

=== Complete GT World Challenge Europe results ===
==== GT World Challenge Europe Endurance Cup ====
(key) (Races in bold indicate pole position; results in italics indicate fastest lap)

Year	Team	Car	Class	1	2	3	4	5	6	7	Pos	Points
2018	Oman Racing with TF Sport	Aston Martin Vantage AMR GT3	Silver	MNZ	SIL	LEC	SPA; 6H; 61	SPA; 12H; 61	SPA; 24H; Ret	CAT	22nd	2
2019	Garage 59	Aston Martin Vantage AMR GT3	Am	MNZ	SIL	LEC	SPA; 6H; 40	SPA; 12H; 41	SPA; 24H; 47	CAT	21st	17
2021	Garage 59 AMR	Aston Martin Vantage AMR GT3	Pro	MNZ	LEC	SPA; 6H; 15	SPA; 12H; 3	SPA; 24H; 3	NÜR	CAT	13th	22
2022	Heart of Racing with TF Sport	Aston Martin Vantage AMR GT3	Pro	IMO	LEC	SPA; 6H; 60	SPA; 12H; 51	SPA; 24H; 38	HOC	CAT	NC	0
2024	Walkenhorst Racing	Aston Martin Vantage AMR GT3 Evo	Pro	LEC; Ret	SPA; 6H; 16	SPA; 12H; 15	SPA; 24H; 4	NÜR; 13	MNZ	JED; 11	18th	12
2025	Beechdean Motorsport	Aston Martin Vantage AMR GT3 Evo	Pro-Am	LEC	MNZ	SPA; 6H; 24	SPA; 12H; 34	SPA; 24H; 32	NÜR	CAT	NC	0
2026	Comtoyou Racing	Aston Martin Vantage AMR GT3 Evo	Pro	LEC	MNZ	SPA; 6H	SPA; 12H	SPA; 24H	NÜR	ALG; Ret	NC‡	0‡

=== Complete FIA World Endurance Championship results ===
(key) (Races in bold indicate pole position; races in italics indicate fastest lap)

Year	Entrant	Class	Chassis	Engine	1	2	3	4	5	6	7	8	Rank	Points
2019–20	Aston Martin Racing	LMGTE Am	Aston Martin Vantage AMR GTE	Aston Martin M177 4.0 L Turbo V8	SIL; 2	FUJ; 11	SHA; 3	BHR; 2	COA; 2	SPA; 9	LMS; 6	BHR; 9	7th	100.5
2025	Aston Martin THOR Team	Hypercar	Aston Martin Valkyrie	Aston Martin RA 6.5 L V12	QAT; Ret	IMO	SPA	LMS; 13	SÃO	COA	FUJ	BHR; 15	31st	0
2026	Aston Martin THOR Team	Hypercar	Aston Martin Valkyrie	Aston Martin RA 6.5 L V12	IMO	SPA	LMS; 8	SÃO	COA	FUJ	CAT	MNZ	22nd	8

=== Complete IMSA SportsCar Championship results ===
(key) (Races in bold indicate pole position; races in italics indicate fastest lap)

Year	Team	Class	Make	Engine	1	2	3	4	5	6	7	8	9	10	11	12	Rank	Points	Ref
2020	Aston Martin Racing	GTD	Aston Martin Vantage AMR GT3	Aston Martin M177 4.0 L Turbo V8	DAY; 17	DAY	SEB	ELK	VIR	ATL	MDO	CLT	PET	LGA	SEB		58th	14	
2021	Heart of Racing Team	GTD	Aston Martin Vantage AMR GT3	Aston Martin M177 4.0 L Turbo V8	DAY; 5	SEB; 3	MDO; 4	DET; 1	WGL; 3	WGL; 3	**LIM**; 1	ELK; 4	LGA; 5	LBH; 6	VIR; 5	PET; 1	3rd	3111	
2022	Heart of Racing Team	GTD Pro	Aston Martin Vantage AMR GT3	Aston Martin M177 4.0 L Turbo V8	DAY; 13	SEB; 11	LBH; 1	LGA; 5			WGL; 1	MOS; 3	LIM; 2	ELK; 4	**VIR**; 4	PET; 4	4th	3103	
2022	Heart of Racing Team	GTD	Aston Martin Vantage AMR GT3	Aston Martin M177 4.0 L Turbo V8					MDO	DET; 2							48th	352	
2023	Heart of Racing Team	GTD Pro	Aston Martin Vantage AMR GT3	Aston Martin M177 4.0 L Turbo V8	DAY; 7	SEB; 8	LBH; 4	LGA; 5	WGL; 6	MOS; 5	LIM; 1	ELK; 1	VIR; 4	IMS; 2	PET; 4		5th	3427	
2024	Heart of Racing Team	GTD Pro	Aston Martin Vantage AMR GT3 Evo	Aston Martin M177 4.0 L Turbo V8	DAY; 4	SEB; 5	LGA; 6	DET; 3	WGL; 1	MOS; 5	ELK; 3	VIR; 3	IMS; 5	PET; 3			2nd	3118	
2025	Heart of Racing Team	GTD Pro	Aston Martin Vantage AMR GT3 Evo	Aston Martin M177 4.0 L Turbo V8	DAY; 14						MOS		VIR				43rd	191	
2025	Aston Martin THOR Team	GTP	Aston Martin Valkyrie	Aston Martin RA 6.5 L V12		SEB; 9	LBH; 8	LGA; 10	DET; 8	WGL; 9		ELK; 6		IMS; 11	PET; 2		12th	2049	
2026	Aston Martin THOR Team	GTP	Aston Martin Valkyrie	Aston Martin RA 6.5 L V12	DAY; 10	SEB; 9	LBH; 9	LGA; 8	DET; 10	WGL; 11	ELK; 5	IMS; 8	PET; 5				14th	2242	

^{*} Season still in progress.

Sporting positions
Preceded by Ross Wylie; Jake Giddings	British GT Championship; GT4 Champion; 2015; With: Jamie Chadwick	Succeeded by Graham Johnson; Mike Robinson
