= Manny Franco (racing driver) =

American racing driver

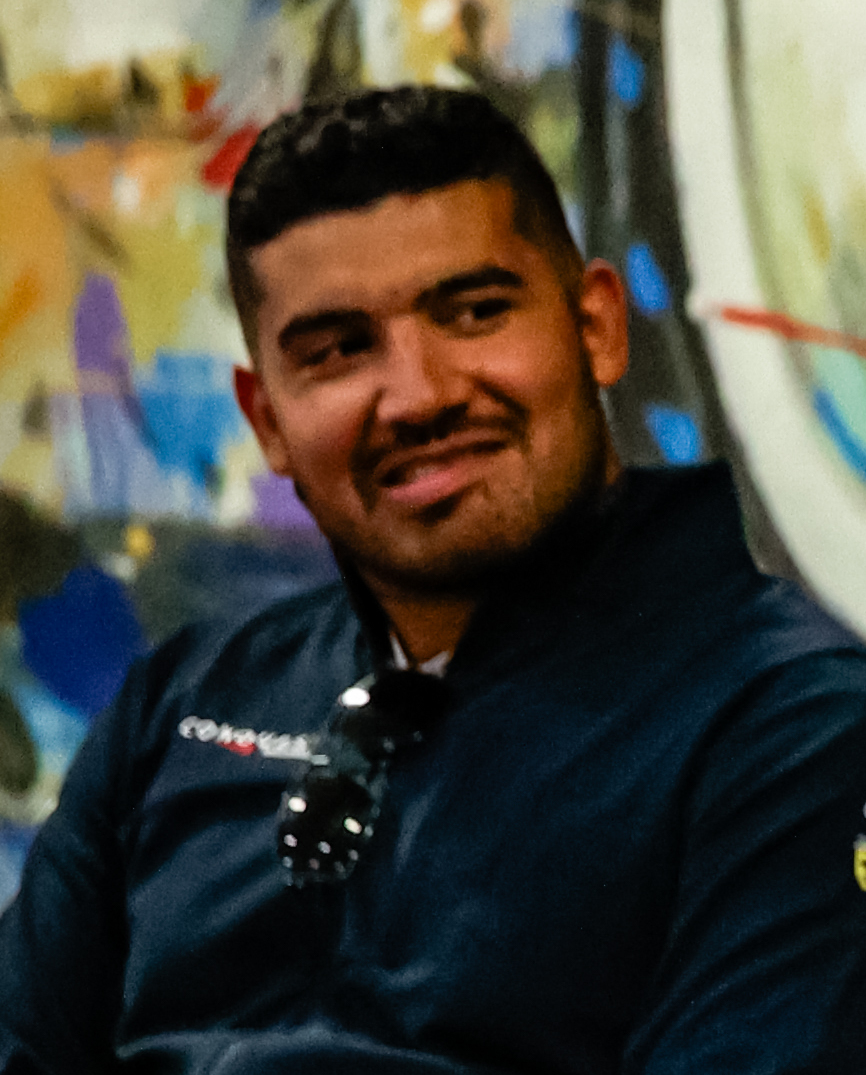
- Franco at the 2025 SportsCar Grand Prix media event
- Nationality: (United States) American
- Born: 1995 (age 30–31) Milwaukee, Wisconsin, United States

IMSA SportsCar Championship career
- Current team: Conquest Racing
- Categorisation: FIA Silver
- Years active: 2024-present
- Car number: 34
- Starts: 17
- Wins: 1
- Poles: 0
- Fastest laps: 0
- Best finish: 4th in 2024

Previous series
- 2024-25 2023 2023 2022-23 2022 2022: Asian Le Mans Series - GT; GT World Challenge Europe Endurance Cup; Intercontinental GT Challenge; GT World Challenge America; GT4 America Series; Michelin Pilot Challenge

Manuel "Manny" Franco (born 1995) is an American auto racing driver who currently competes in the IMSA SportsCar Championship for Conquest Racing.

== Racing career ==
=== Ferrari Challenge North America ===
Franco's racing career began in 2021 entering late in the Ferrari Challenge North America season. Competing in the Coppa Shell category, he would find quick success in his first race weekend at Road America, winning on his debut race and finishing second shortly after. Despite competing in only four races, Franco would finish eighth in the Coppa Shell championship.

Franco would find further success in 2022. Now competing for overall victory, Franco achieved five wins en route to a second-place finish in the championship, finishing only one point behind Jeremy Clarke in what would be his most successful season to date.

Franco's involvement in Ferrari Challenge North America would decrease in the seasons following, but he would still finish fifth place in the 2023 season on a part-time schedule, and he would win two of his four races in the 2025 season.

=== GT World Challenge America ===
A year after his debut, Franco would step up to GT3 racing with Conquest Racing, participating in the Sebring rounds of the 2022 GT World Challenge America season. Partnered with Alessandro Balzan in the Pro class, he would finish fourth and second in the respective races, marking his first podium in GT3 machinery.

Franco would return full-time for the 2023 season, continuing to partner with Balzan in the Pro class. The two of them would win both races of the Road America round, which wound up being the first victories of the Ferrari 296 GT3 on North American soil. They would eventually finish fifth in the overall Pro class championship.

=== IMSA SportsCar Championship ===
On September 7, 2023, it was announced that Franco would move up to the IMSA SportsCar Championship as a part of Conquest Racing's return to full-time IMSA competition with Albert Costa in GTD for the 2024 season. He would once again find quick success with a third place class finish on debut at the 2024 24 Hours of Daytona. He and Costa achieved their second podium of the year at the 2024 Sahlen's Six Hours of The Glen with a second place class finish. At the 2024 Petit Le Mans, Franco and Costa would win in GTD, marking Franco's first, and so far only, win in IMSA competition. The strong result would cap off a fourth place finish in the GTD championship for them both.

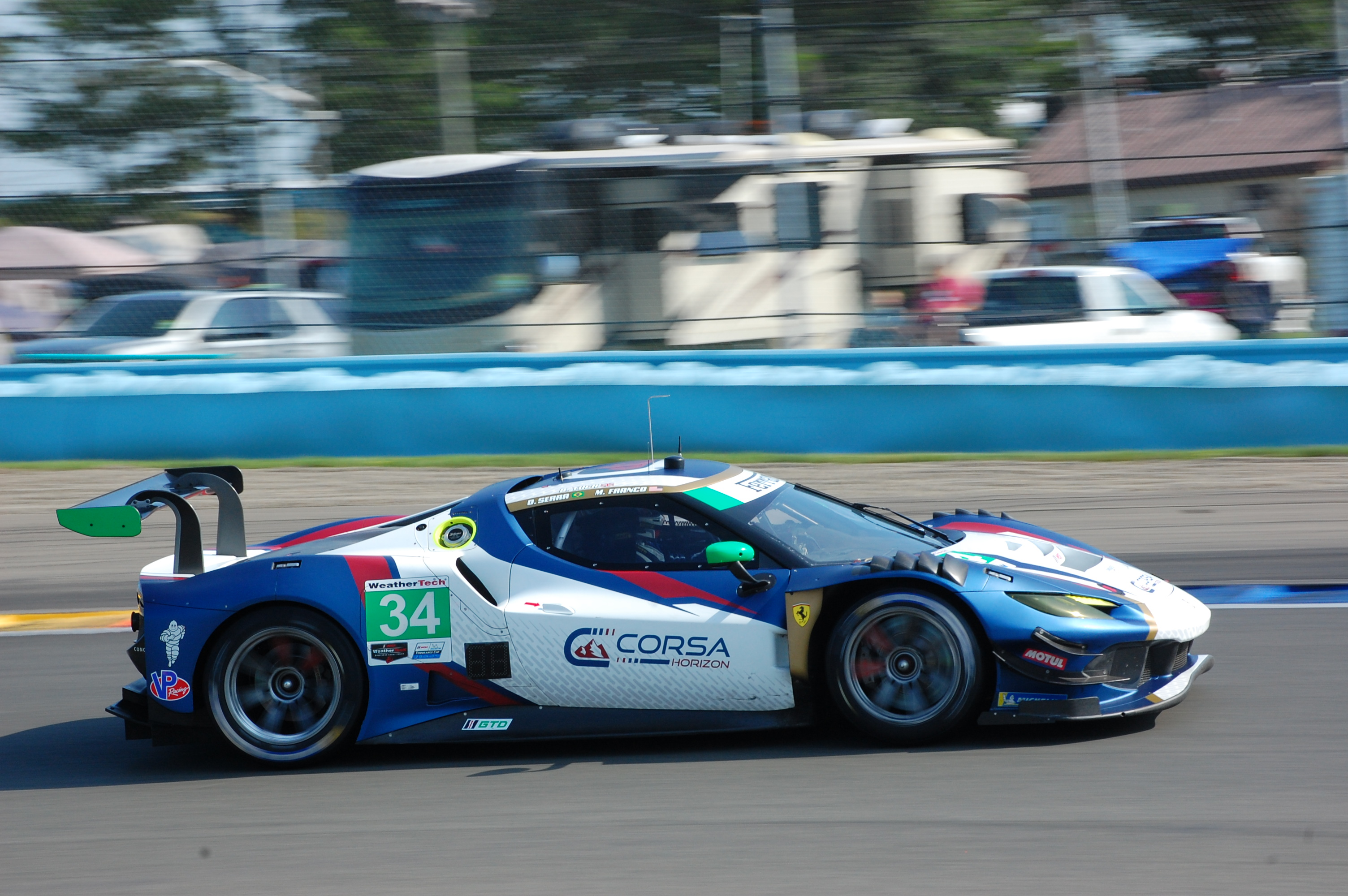
Franco driving a Ferrari 296 GT3 for Conquest Racing at Watkins Glen in 2025.

Franco returned with Conquest Racing for the 2025 season, this time partnered with Daniel Serra. His sophomore campaign in IMSA would not yield results as successful as the previous year, however the two would still reach the GTD podium three times. At the 2025 Petit Le Mans, Franco was involved in a multi-car incident on the first lap, causing him to be transported to a local hospital. He would return to the team shortly afterwards without serious injury. Franco would finish the season seventh in the GTD championship.

Franco will race with Conquest Racing in IMSA competition for the third straight year in 2026.

== Personal life ==
Franco was born in Milwaukee and resides in the nearby suburb of West Allis. He regards Road America as his home track but was unable to attend races there growing up. Instead, most of his exposure to racing was at the Wisconsin State Fair Park where he would listen to cars at the Milwaukee Mile. He participated in track days prior to racing.

== Racing results ==
=== Career Summary ===
Season	Series	Team	Races	Wins	Poles	F/laps	Podiums	Points	Position
2021	Ferrari Challenge North America - Coppa Shell	Ferrari Lake Forest	4	1	2	2	3	47	8th
2022	Michelin Pilot Challenge	NTE/MC2 Autosport	4	0	0	0	0	520	43rd
2022	GT4 America Series - Silver	Conquest Racing	2	0	0	0	0	20	7th
2022	GT World Challenge America - Pro	Conquest Racing	2	0	0	0	1	N/A	N/A
2022	Ferrari Challenge North America - Trofeo Pirelli	Ferrari Lake Forest	10	5	6	6	6	113	**2nd**
2023	GT World Challenge America - Pro	Conquest Racing	12	2	1	0	4	170	5th
2023	Intercontinental GT Challenge	Conquest Racing	1	0	0	0	0	N/A	N/A
2023	GT World Challenge Europe Endurance Cup	AF Corse	1	0	0	0	0	0	NC
2023	GT World Challenge Europe Endurance Cup - Silver	AF Corse	1	0	0	0	1	15	17th
2023	Ferrari Challenge North America - Trofeo Pirelli	Ferrari Lake Forest	8	3	3	4	3	80	5th
2024	IMSA SportsCar Championship - GTD	Conquest Racing	10	1	0	0	3	2577	4th
2024-25	Asian Le Mans Series - GT	AF Corse	6	0	1	0	1	32	10th
2025	IMSA SportsCar Championship - GTD	Conquest Racing	10	0	0	0	3	2534	7th
2025	Ferrari Challenge North America - Trofeo Pirelli	Ferrari Lake Forest	4	2	0	0	2	92	11th
2026	IMSA SportsCar Championship - GTD	Conquest Racing	3	0	0	0	1	769	43rd

=== Complete IMSA SportsCar Championship results ===
(key) (Races in bold indicate pole position; races in italics indicate fastest lap)

Year	Team	Class	Make	Engine	1	2	3	4	5	6	7	8	9	10	Rank	Points
2024	Conquest Racing	GTD	Ferrari 296 GT3	Ferrari F163CE 3.0 L Turbo V6	DAY; 3	SEB; 11	LBH; 12	LGA; 15	WGL; 2	MOS; 11	ELK; 6	VIR; 5	IMS; 19	PET; 1	4th	2577
2025	Conquest Racing	GTD	Ferrari 296 GT3	Ferrari F163CE 3.0 L Turbo V6	DAY; 11	SEB; 7	LBH; 16	LGA; 3	WGL; 10	MOS; 11	ELK; 3	VIR; 6	IMS; 3	PET; 16	7th	2534
2026	Conquest Racing	GTD	Ferrari 296 GT3 Evo	Ferrari F163CE 3.0 L Turbo V6	DAY; 14	SEB; 7	LBH; 3	LGA	WGL	MOS	ELK	VIR	IMS	PET	43rd	769

=== Complete 24 Hours of Daytona results ===
Year	Team	Co-Drivers	Car	Class	Laps	Pos.	Class Pos.
2024	(United States) Conquest Racing	(Spain) Albert Costa (Monaco) Cédric Sbirrazzuoli (Italy) Alessandro Balzan	Ferrari 296 GT3	GTD	730	22nd	**3rd**
2025	(United States) Conquest Racing	(Brazil) Daniel Serra (Monaco) Cédric Sbirrazzuoli (Italy) Giacomo Altoè	Ferrari 296 GT3	GTD	673	40th	11th

=== Complete Asian Le Mans Series results ===
(key) (Races in bold indicate pole position; races in italics indicate fastest lap)

Year	Team	Class	Car	Engine	1	2	3	4	5	6	Pos.	Points
2024-25	AF Corse	GT	Ferrari 296 GT3	Ferrari F163CE 3.0 L Turbo V6	SEP; 1; 4	**SEP**; **2**; 3	DUB; 1; 16	DUB; 2; 19	ABU; 1; 9	ABU; 2; 14	10th	32
