= Conquest Racing =

Auto racing team

(United States) Conquest Racing
- Founded: 1997
- Founder(s): Éric Bachelart (owner)
- Base: Indianapolis, Indiana, United States
- Team principal(s): Éric Bachelart
- Current series: IMSA SportsCar Championship; Ferrari Challenge North America
- Former series: IndyCar Series; Atlantic Championship; Champ Car World Series
- Current drivers: IMSA SportsCar Championship: 34. (Spain) Albert Costa (United States) Manny Franco (Monaco) Cédric Sbirrazzuoli (Italy) Alessandro Balzan; 35. (Brazil) Daniel Serra (Spain) Albert Costa (Italy) Giacomo Altoè
- Drivers' Championships: 2021 IMSA Prototype Challenge: Danny Kok, George Staikos
- Website: https://conquestracing.com/

Conquest Racing is an auto racing team based in Indianapolis, United States that currently competes in the Ferrari Challenge North America as well as the GTD Pro and GTD classes of the IMSA SportsCar Championship. They previously competed in the IndyCar Series, the Atlantic Championship, the Champ Car World Series, and the GT World Challenge America.

== History ==
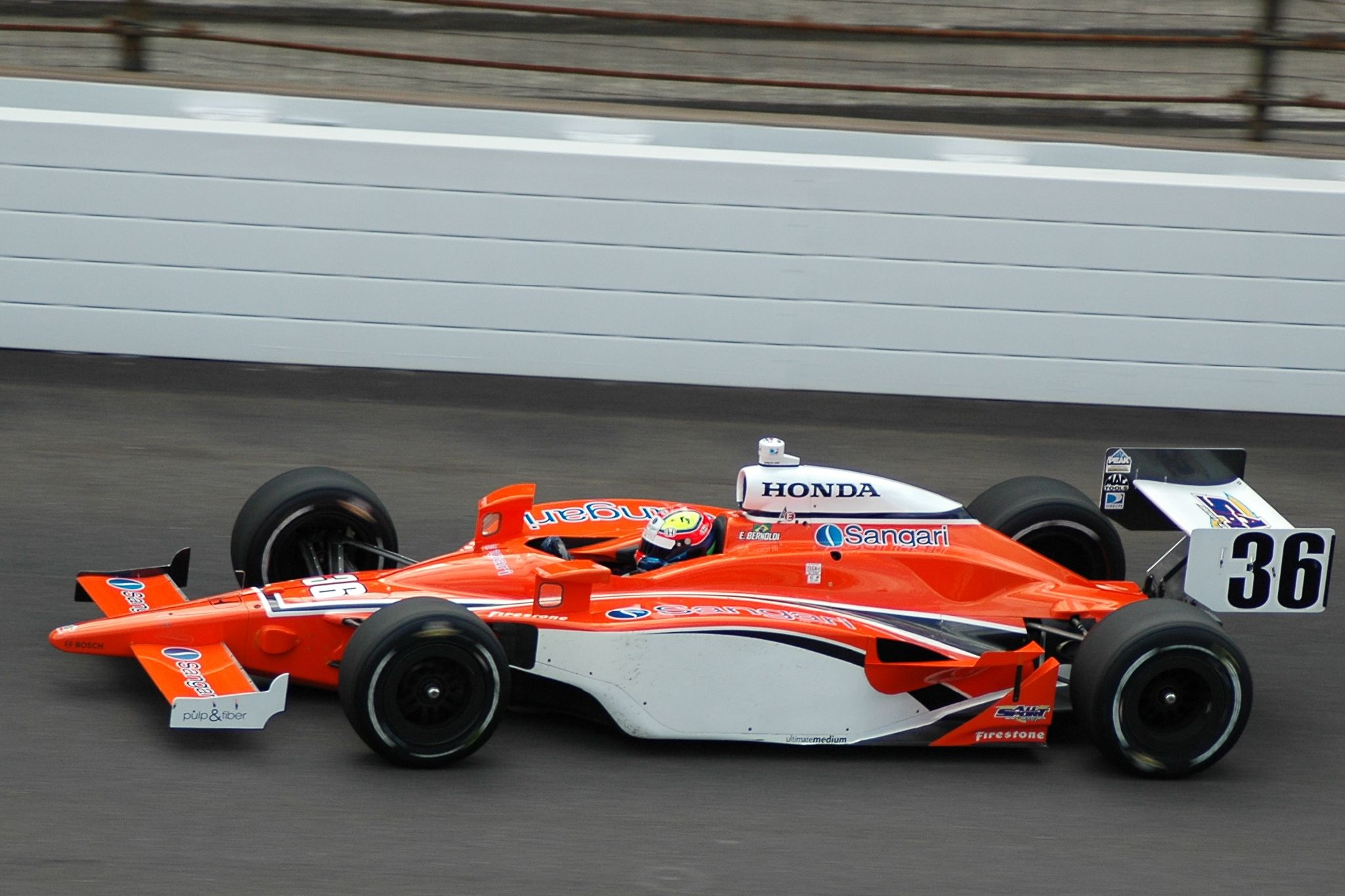
Conquest's Enrique Bernoldi practices for the 2008 Indianapolis 500.

It is owned by former series competitor Éric Bachelart. The team ran in Indy Lights competition in the late 1990s with Felipe Giaffone, who brought sponsorship from Hollywood cigarettes and Mi-Jack sponsored brothers Chris and Jamie Menninga. The team jumped to the Indy Racing League in 2002 with Laurent Rédon; the Frenchman won rookie of the year honors but was not retained when the team jumped ship to Champ Car in 2003, as he wanted to come back to France for his family.

The team ran Mario Haberfeld in an unloved Reynard chassis and shared information and resources with Emerson Fittipaldi's team, that ran future Formula One driver Tiago Monteiro. In 2004 the team expanded to two cars, fielding Justin Wilson in a Lola with several others in a Reynard. Wilson signed with RuSPORT for 2005 and Conquest ran teenagers Nelson Philippe and Andrew Ranger, each 18 years old when the season started.

While Philippe left for 2006, the team retained Ranger dependent on his Canadian sponsorship and signed 2005 Champ Car Atlantic champion Charles Zwolsman to the second car. There were rumors Darren Manning would replace Ranger early in the season but this was put to rest with his on-track performances and more money coming into the team. Internet betting web site Goldenpalace.com signed on as Zwolsman's sponsor at the second race in Houston.

The team branched into the Atlantic ranks in 2006 with drivers Graham Rahal and Al Unser III.

After the 2006 season, Mike Lanigan pulled his company's support from the race team due to a lack of funding. In a Speedtv.com article, Bachelart was about to shut down his team when his sponsor called with a deal for the 2007 season. But on February 6, 2007, a New York-based company, later confirmed to be vodka company 42 Below, gave them sponsorship with former A1 Grand Prix driver Matt Halliday. However, after poor performances in Vegas, Long Beach, and Houston, Halliday was released in favor of Jan Heylen. Jan Heylen drove the next 9 races for Conquest Racing and his best finish was a 2nd place at the Bavaria Grand Prix of Holland. On October 3 it was announced that Jan Heylen would be replaced for the rest of the season by the returning Nelson Philippe.

In late December 2007 the team announced the signing of new marketing partner, Opes Prime Group Ltd, an Australian-based financial services provider. Following the unification of Champ Car and the Indy Racing League, Conquest was the first Champ Car team to confirm their participation in the IRL IndyCar Series, with driver Franck Perera named to drive one of the team's two cars. The other driver entry has been confirmed as Enrique Bernoldi will be driving for Conquest Racing during the 2008 IRL Championship.

However, on the eve of the opening race of the 2008 IndyCar Season, on 28 March 2008, Opes Prime was placed in receivership, and left the team shortly after. Sangari stepped up to sponsor both cars after Ares also left the team. After the Long Beach Grand Prix, Perera was replaced in the #34 car by Jaime Camara to complete a fully Brazilian lineup. Alex Tagliani replaced Bernoldi in the last three races of the season due to an injury.

Tagliani ran for the team part-time in 2009, including the Toronto Grand Prix that saw Tagliani lead a majority of the race before being eliminated in a late race crash. Conquest Racing entered a second car for the 2009 Indianapolis 500 with Bruno Junqueira the driver of the number 36. Junqueira qualified for the 500, while Tagliani did not, which resulted in Tagliani taking over the 36 car for the 500.

Nelson Philippe returned to the team late in 2009 after Tagliani and Conquest parted ways. The season was cut short for Phillipe and Conquest after a horrifying accident with Will Power at Infineon Raceway.

Mario Romancini was announced as the driver of the Conquest Racing number 34 for the entire IndyCar Series 2010 schedule. Bertrand Baguette began running for the team in a second car at Barber, bringing Belgian sponsorship. The team placed both cars in the Indianapolis 500 where Romancini finished 13th and Baguette ended up in 22nd after losing a mirror early in the race. Conquest Racing planned to continue running both drivers for the remainder of the season but replaced Romancini with Francesco Dracone at Mid-Ohio and Infineon due to Romancini's lack of sponsorship.

For 2011, the team ran only one car, the 34, with Colombian driver Sebastián Saavedra.

In 2012, the team decided to leave the IndyCar series and enter the American Le Mans Series with a Morgan-Nissan LMP2 prototype. The team took its first victory at the 2012 Grand Prix of Mosport.

No more actively involved in motorsport since 2013 season, Conquest Racing comes back in IMSA Prototype Challenge for the 2019 season in LMP3 category. In 2024 Conquest Racing also won the IMSA SportsCar Weekend in the GTD Pro class.

== Racing record ==
Year	Car	Drivers	Races	Wins	Poles	Fast laps	Points	D.C.
Indy Racing League Results
2002	Dallara-Infiniti	(France) Laurent Redon	15	0	0	0	229	12th
CART/Champ Car World Series Results
2003	Reynard-Cosworth	(Brazil) Mario Haberfeld	18	0	0	1	71	12th
2004	Lola/Reynard-Cosworth	(United Kingdom) Justin Wilson	14	0	0	0	188	11th
2004	Lola/Reynard-Cosworth	(Brazil) Alex Sperafico	8	0	0	0	47	19th
2004	Lola/Reynard-Cosworth	(France) Nelson Philippe	6	0	0	0	89	16th
2005	Lola-Cosworth	(Canada) Andrew Ranger	13	0	0	0	140	10th
2005	Lola-Cosworth	(France) Nelson Philippe	13	0	0	0	117	13th
2006	Lola-Cosworth	(Canada) Andrew Ranger	14	0	0	0	200	10th
2006	Lola-Cosworth	(Netherlands) Charles Zwolsman Jr.	14	0	0	0	161	13th
2007	Panoz-Cosworth	(New Zealand) Matt Halliday	3	0	0	0	18	21st
2007	Panoz-Cosworth	(Belgium) Jan Heylen	9	0	0	0	104	16th
2007	Panoz-Cosworth	(France) Nelson Philippe	2	0	0	0	28	19th
IndyCar Series Results
2008	Dallara-Honda; Panoz-Cosworth^{2}	(France) Franck Perera	3^{1}	0	0	0	71	29th
2008	Dallara-Honda; Panoz-Cosworth^{2}	(Brazil) Enrique Bernoldi	15	0	0	0	220	22nd
2008	Dallara-Honda	(Brazil) Jaime Camara	15	0	0	0	174	23rd
2008	Dallara-Honda	(Canada) Alex Tagliani	3	0	0	0	56	32nd
2009	Dallara-Honda	(Canada) Alex Tagliani	7	0	0	0	114	22nd
2009	Dallara-Honda	(Brazil) Bruno Junqueira	0	0	0	0	0	NA
2009	Dallara-Honda	(France) Nelson Philippe	0^{1}	0	0	0	16	35th
2009	Dallara-Honda	(Japan) Kosuke Matsuura	1	0	0	0	13	36th
2010	Dallara-Honda	(Brazil) Mario Romancini	11	0	0	0	149	24th
2010	Dallara-Honda	(Belgium) Bertrand Baguette	15	0	0	0	213	22nd
2010	Dallara-Honda	(Italy) Francesco Dracone	2	0	0	0	24	37th
2010	Dallara-Honda	(South Africa) Tomas Scheckter	2^{1}	0	0	0	89	29th
2010	Dallara-Honda	(United States) Roger Yasukawa	1	0	0	0	12	40th
2010	Dallara-Honda	(Colombia) Sebastián Saavedra	1^{1}	0	0	0	29	33rd
2011	Dallara-Honda	(Colombia) Sebastián Saavedra	14	0	0	0	178	25th
2011	Dallara-Honda	(Brazil) João Paulo de Oliveira	1	0	0	0	10	44th
2011	Dallara-Honda	(United Kingdom) Dillon Battistini	1	0	0	0	10	46th
2011	Dallara-Honda	(United Kingdom) Pippa Mann	1^{1}	0	0	0	32	38th

^{1}Driver competed for Conquest in addition to another team that season.
^{2}Only used for the Toyota Grand Prix of Long Beach.

=== Complete IRL IndyCar Series results ===
(key)

Year	Chassis	Engine	Drivers	No.	1	2	3	4	5	6	7	8	9	10	11	12	13	14	15	16	17	18	19
2002					HMS	PHX	FON	NAZ	INDY	TXS	PPIR	RIR	KAN	NSH	MCH	KTY	GAT	CHI	TXS				
2002	Dallara IR-02	Infiniti VRH35ADE V8	(France) Laurent Redon	34	15	14	3	15	22	15	7	15	22	16	11	20	22	25	10				
2008					HMS	STP	MOT	LBH^{1}	KAN	INDY	MIL	TXS	IOW	RIR	WGL	NSH	MDO	EDM	KTY	SNM	DET	CHI	SRF^{2}
2008	Panoz DP01	Cosworth XFE V8t	(France) Franck Perera	34				6															
2008	Dallara IR-05	Honda HI7R V8	(France) Franck Perera	34	14	20																	
2008	Dallara IR-05	Honda HI7R V8	(Brazil) Jaime Camara	34					21	31	24	24	20	14	18	21	14	23	16	24	25	18	19
2008	Dallara IR-05	Honda HI7R V8	(Canada) Alex Tagliani	36																	22	12	4
2008	Dallara IR-05	Honda HI7R V8	(Brazil) Enrique Bernoldi	36	18	5			25	15	16	23	17	26	21	20	26	16	22	21			
2008	Panoz DP01	Cosworth XFE V8t	(Brazil) Enrique Bernoldi	36				4															
2009					STP	LBH	KAN	INDY	MIL	TXS	IOW	RIR	WGL	TOR	EDM	KTY	MDO	SNM	CHI	MOT	HMS		
2009	Dallara IR-05	Honda HI7R V8	(France) Nelson Philippe	34														DNS					
2009	Dallara IR-05	Honda HI7R V8	(Japan) Kosuke Matsuura	34																17			
2009	Dallara IR-05	Honda HI7R V8	(Canada) Alex Tagliani	34	10	10		DNQ		14				9	13								
2009	Dallara IR-05	Honda HI7R V8	(Canada) Alex Tagliani	36				11															
2009	Dallara IR-05	Honda HI7R V8	(Brazil) Bruno Junqueira	36				Wth															
2010					SAO	STP	ALA	LBH	KAN	INDY	TXS	IOW	WGL	TOR	EDM	MDO	SNM	CHI	KTY	MOT	HMS		
2010	Dallara IR-05	Honda HI7R V8	(Brazil) Mario Romancini	34	17	13	22	23	22	13	17	16	22	22	24								
2010	Dallara IR-05	Honda HI7R V8	(Italy) Francesco Dracone	34												22							
2010	Dallara IR-05	Honda HI7R V8	(Italy) Francesco Dracone	36													20						
2010	Dallara IR-05	Honda HI7R V8	(Belgium) Bertrand Baguette	34													23	12	10	25	15		
2010	Dallara IR-05	Honda HI7R V8	(Belgium) Bertrand Baguette	36			20	24	20	22	22	17	18	16	14	11							
2010	Dallara IR-05	Honda HI7R V8	(South Africa) Tomas Scheckter	36														28	14				
2010	Dallara IR-05	Honda HI7R V8	(United States) Roger Yasukawa	36																20			
2010	Dallara IR-05	Honda HI7R V8	(Colombia) Sebastián Saavedra	36																	16		
2011					STP	ALA	LBH	SAO	INDY	TXS		MIL	IOW	TOR	EDM	MDO	NHA	SNM	BAL	MOT	KTY	LSV	
2011	Dallara IR-05	Honda HI7R V8	(Colombia) Sebastián Saavedra	34	13	26	14	11	DNQ	28	29	23	20	25	16	27	15	14	13			C^{3}	
2011	Dallara IR-05	Honda HI7R V8	(Brazil) João Paulo de Oliveira	34																26			
2011	Dallara IR-05	Honda HI7R V8	(United Kingdom) Dillon Battistini	34																	28		
2011	Dallara IR-05	Honda HI7R V8	(United Kingdom) Pippa Mann	36					20														

1. Run to Champ Car specifications.
2. Non-points-paying, exhibition race.
3. The final race at Las Vegas was canceled due to Dan Wheldon's death.

=== Complete CART / Champ Car World Series results ===
(key)

Year	Chassis	Engine	Drivers	No.	1	2	3	4	5	6	7	8	9	10	11	12	13	14	15	16	17	18
2003					STP	MTY	LBH	BRH	LAU	MIL	LAG	POR	CLE	TOR	VAN	ROA	MDO	MTL	DEN	MIA	MXC	SFR
2003	Reynard 02i	Ford XFE V8t	(Brazil) Mario Haberfeld	34	4	16	9	9	14	7	5	8	15	19	7	8	10	11	10	5	12	14
2004					LBH	MTY	MIL	POR	CLE	TOR	VAN	ROA	DEN	MTL	LAG	LSV	SFR	MXC				
2004	Reynard 02i	Ford XFE V8t	(Brazil) Alex Sperafico	14	17	16	15	16	13	10	17	17										
2004	Reynard 02i	Ford XFE V8t	(France) Nelson Philippe	14									13									
2004	Lola B02/00	Ford XFE V8t	(France) Nelson Philippe	14										17	16	9	10	16				
2004	Lola B02/00	Ford XFE V8t	(United Kingdom) Justin Wilson	34	6	6		5	18	12	14	7	7	14	18	8	8	4				
2004	Reynard 02i	Ford XFE V8t	(United Kingdom) Justin Wilson	34			11															
2005					LBH	MTY	MIL	POR	CLE	TOR	EDM	SJO	DEN	MTL	LSV	SRF	MXC					
2005	Lola B02/00	Ford XFE V8t	(Canada) Andrew Ranger	27	17	2	16	7	8	11	18	16	10	11	14	10	9					
2005	Lola B02/00	Ford XFE V8t	(France) Nelson Philippe	34	18	12*	12	12	13	10	9	15	9	15	16	14	7					
2006					LBH	HOU	MTY	MIL	POR	CLE	TOR	EDM	SJO	DEN	MTL	ROA	SRF	MXC				
2006	Lola B02/00	Ford XFE V8t	(Canada) Andrew Ranger	27	6	6	7	7	9	11	10	7	13	14	15	8	5	8				
2006	Lola B02/00	Ford XFE V8t	(Netherlands) Charles Zwolsman Jr.	34	12	15	12	9	12	15	9	10	9	10	8	7	7	11				
2007					LSV	LBH	HOU	POR	CLE	MTT	TOR	EDM	SJO	ROA	ZOL	ASN	SFR	MXC				
2007	Panoz DP01	Cosworth XFE V8t	(Belgium) Jan Heylen	34				15	14	16	13	10	9	6	13	2						
2007	Panoz DP01	Cosworth XFE V8t	(France) Nelson Philippe	34													6	12				
2007	Panoz DP01	Cosworth XFE V8t	(New Zealand) Matt Halliday	42	16	15	14															
