= Maurice Smith (racing driver) =

American racing driver (born 1959)

- Nationality: (United States) American
- Born: December 17, 1959 (age 66) United States

European Le Mans Series career
- Debut season: 2022
- Current team: Cool Racing
- Categorisation: FIA Bronze
- Car number: 17
- Starts: 6 (6 entries)
- Wins: 2
- Podiums: 4
- Poles: 0
- Fastest laps: 0
- Best finish: 1st (LMP3) in 2022

Previous series
- 2019-22 2019: Le Mans Cup; IMSA Prototype Challenge

Maurice "Mo" Smith (born 17 December 1959) is an American racing driver. He is the 2022 champion of the European Le Mans Series in the LMP3 class.

== Racing record ==
=== Racing career summary ===
| Season | Series | Team | Races | Wins | Poles | F/Laps | Podiums | Points | Position |
|---|---|---|---|---|---|---|---|---|---|
| 2014–15 | Formula Skip Barber Winter Series | N/A | 17 | 0 | 0 | 0 | 1 | 0 | NC† |
| 2019 | Le Mans Cup - LMP3 | Cool Racing | 6 | 0 | 0 | 0 | 0 | 7.5 | 24th |
| 2019 | Ultimate Cup Series - Challenge Proto-LMP3 | Cool Racing | 1 | 0 | 0 | 0 | 0 | 24 | 27th |
| 2019 | IMSA Prototype Challenge - LMP3 | Simraceway Motorsports | 4 | 0 | 0 | 0 | 0 | 69 | 29th |
| 2020 | Le Mans Cup - LMP3 | Cool Racing | 7 | 1 | 0 | 0 | 3 | 59 | 5th |
| 2021 | Le Mans Cup - LMP3 | Cool Racing | 7 | 0 | 0 | 0 | 3 | 71 | **2nd** |
| 2021 | Ligier European Series - JS2R | Cool Racing | 2 | 0 | 0 | 0 | 0 | 22 | 10th |
| 2022 | European Le Mans Series - LMP3 | Cool Racing | 6 | 2 | 0 | 0 | 4 | 86 | **1st** |
| 2022 | Le Mans Cup - LMP3 | Cool Racing | 7 | 1 | 0 | 0 | 1 | 53 | 4th |

^{†} As Smith was a guest driver, he was ineligible to score points.

=== Complete European Le Mans Series results ===
(key) (Races in bold indicate pole position; results in italics indicate fastest lap)

| Year | Entrant | Class | Chassis | Engine | 1 | 2 | 3 | 4 | 5 | 6 | Rank | Points |
|---|---|---|---|---|---|---|---|---|---|---|---|---|
| 2022 | Cool Racing | LMP3 | Ligier JS P320 | Nissan VK56DE 5.6L V8 | LEC; 1 | IMO; 3 | MNZ; Ret | CAT; 3 | SPA; Ret | ALG; 1 | 1st | 86 |
