= 2022 GT4 America Series =

Racing series

The 2022 Pirelli GT4 America Series is the fourth season of the GT4 America Series. The season began on April 15 at Sonoma Raceway and will end on October 9 at Indianapolis Motor Speedway.

== Calendar ==
The preliminary calendar was released on September 4, 2021, without disclosing the location of round 2. On October 10, 2021, the SRO announced that Ozarks International Raceway would fill the vacancy in the schedule, pending FIA circuit homologation. The round at Virginia International Raceway was also postponed one week to avoid a clash with the 2022 24 Hours of Le Mans. On April 27, 2022, the SRO announced that Ozarks round was replaced with NOLA Motorsports Park on the same date due to the challenges related with infrastructure and supply chain.

Round	Circuit	Date
1	(United States) Sonoma Raceway, Sonoma, California	April 15–17
2	(United States) NOLA Motorsports Park, Avondale, Louisiana	May 20–22
3	(United States) Virginia International Raceway, Alton, Virginia	June 17–19
4	(United States) Watkins Glen International, Watkins Glen, New York	July 22–24
5	(United States) Road America, Elkhart Lake, Wisconsin	August 19–21
6	(United States) Sebring International Raceway, Sebring, Florida	September 23–25
7	(United States) Indianapolis Motor Speedway, Indianapolis, Indiana	October 7–9

== Entry list ==
Team	Car	No.	Drivers	Class	Rounds
(Japan) TGR Hattori Motorsports	Toyota GR Supra GT4	016	(United States) Seth Lucas	PA	1–3
(Japan) TGR Hattori Motorsports	Toyota GR Supra GT4	016	(United States) Matt Plumb	PA	1–3
(United States) GMG Racing	Porsche 718 Cayman GT4 Clubsport	032	(United States) James Sofronas	Am	1
(United States) GMG Racing	Porsche 718 Cayman GT4 Clubsport	032	(United States) Kyle Washington	Am	1
(United States) GMG Racing	Aston Martin Vantage AMR GT4	2	(United States) Jason Bell	PA	1–5, 7
(United States) GMG Racing	Aston Martin Vantage AMR GT4	2	(United States) Andrew Davis	PA	1–5, 7
(United States) GMG Racing	Porsche 718 Cayman GT4 Clubsport	71	(United States) Jay Logan	Am 5 PA 6–7	5–7
(United States) GMG Racing	Porsche 718 Cayman GT4 Clubsport	71	(United States) James Sofronas	Am 5 PA 6–7	5
(United States) GMG Racing	Porsche 718 Cayman GT4 Clubsport	71	(France) Alexandre Prémat	Am 5 PA 6–7	6
(United States) GMG Racing	Porsche 718 Cayman GT4 Clubsport	71	(United States) Joel Miller	Am 5 PA 6–7	7
(United States) Lone Star Racing	Mercedes-AMG GT4	4	(United States) Zane Hodgen	PA	5
(United States) Lone Star Racing	Mercedes-AMG GT4	4	(United States) Cameron Lawrence	PA	5
(United States) ACI Motorsports	Porsche 718 Cayman GT4 Clubsport	7	(United States) Curt Swearingin	PA	7
(United States) ACI Motorsports	Porsche 718 Cayman GT4 Clubsport	7	(Canada) Parker Thompson	PA	7
(United States) NOLASPORT	Porsche 718 Cayman GT4 RS Clubsport	7	(United States) Sean Gibbons	Am	1–4
(United States) NOLASPORT	Porsche 718 Cayman GT4 RS Clubsport	7	(United States) Sam Owen	Am	1–4
(United States) NOLASPORT	Porsche 718 Cayman GT4 RS Clubsport	19	(United States) Alain Stad	Am	All
(United States) NOLASPORT	Porsche 718 Cayman GT4 RS Clubsport	19	(United States) Thomas Merrill	Am	1
(United States) NOLASPORT	Porsche 718 Cayman GT4 RS Clubsport	19	(United States) Seth Thomas	Am	2–3
(United States) NOLASPORT	Porsche 718 Cayman GT4 RS Clubsport	19	(United States) Matt Travis	Am	4–5
(United States) NOLASPORT	Porsche 718 Cayman GT4 RS Clubsport	19	(United States) Kris Wilson	Am	6–7
(United States) NOLASPORT	Porsche 718 Cayman GT4 RS Clubsport	47	(United States) Jason Hart	PA	All
(United States) NOLASPORT	Porsche 718 Cayman GT4 RS Clubsport	47	(United States) Scott Noble	PA	All
(United States) Flying Lizard Motorsports	Aston Martin Vantage AMR GT4	8	(United States) Andy Lee	PA	All
(United States) Flying Lizard Motorsports	Aston Martin Vantage AMR GT4	8	(United States) Elias Sabo	PA	All
(United States) Fast Track Racing	BMW M4 GT4	10	(United States) Tim Horrell	PA	All
(United States) Fast Track Racing	BMW M4 GT4	10	(Brazil) Raphael Matos	PA	1–6
(United States) Fast Track Racing	BMW M4 GT4	10	(United States) Toby Grahovec	PA	7
(United States) Fast Track Racing	BMW M4 GT4	11	(United States) Greg Liefooghe	PA	1–3
(United States) Fast Track Racing	BMW M4 GT4	11	(Canada) Damon Surzyshyn	PA	1–3
(United States) BSport Racing	Aston Martin Vantage AMR GT4	15	(United States) Kenton Koch	PA	1–6
(United States) BSport Racing	Aston Martin Vantage AMR GT4	15	(United States) Bryan Putt	PA	1–6
(United States) TGR Forbush Performance	Toyota GR Supra GT4	16	(United States) Greg Liefooghe	PA	5–7
(United States) TGR Forbush Performance	Toyota GR Supra GT4	16	(Canada) Damon Surzyshyn	PA	5–7
(United States) TGR Forbush Performance	Toyota GR Supra GT4	33	(United States) Caleb Bacon	S	6–7
(United States) TGR Forbush Performance	Toyota GR Supra GT4	33	(United States) Matt Forbush	S	6–7
(United States) TRG - The Racer's Group	Porsche 718 Cayman GT4 RS Clubsport	17	(United States) James Rappaport	Am	1–3, 5–7
(United States) TRG - The Racer's Group	Porsche 718 Cayman GT4 RS Clubsport	17	(United States) Todd Hetherington	Am	1, 5–7
(United States) TRG - The Racer's Group	Porsche 718 Cayman GT4 RS Clubsport	17	(United States) Robert Orcutt	Am	2–3
(United States) TRG - The Racer's Group	Porsche 718 Cayman GT4 RS Clubsport	66	(United States) Jason Alexandridis	Am	All
(United States) TRG - The Racer's Group	Porsche 718 Cayman GT4 RS Clubsport	66	(United States) Derek DeBoer	Am	All
(United States) RS1	Porsche 718 Cayman GT4 RS Clubsport	18	(United States) Eric Filguieras	S	All
(United States) RS1	Porsche 718 Cayman GT4 RS Clubsport	18	(United Kingdom) Stevan McAleer	S	All
(United States) RS1	Porsche 718 Cayman GT4 RS Clubsport	83	(Colombia) Nelson Calle	Am	All
(United States) RS1	Porsche 718 Cayman GT4 RS Clubsport	83	(Colombia) Juan Martínez	Am	All
(United States) Carrus Callas Raceteam	Toyota GR Supra GT4	20	(United States) Terry Borcheller	Am	4–7
(United States) Carrus Callas Raceteam	Toyota GR Supra GT4	20	(United States) Nick Shanny	Am	4–7
(United States) Carrus Callas Raceteam	Toyota GR Supra GT4	21	(United States) Terry Borcheller	Am	2–3
(United States) Carrus Callas Raceteam	Toyota GR Supra GT4	21	(United States) Nick Shanny	Am	2–3
(United States) TGR Accelerating Performance	Toyota GR Supra GT4	21	(United States) Terry Borcheller	Am	1
(United States) TGR Accelerating Performance	Toyota GR Supra GT4	21	(United States) Nick Shanny	Am	1
(United States) TGR Accelerating Performance	Toyota GR Supra GT4	55	(United States) Justin Piscitell	PA	1, 3–7
(United States) TGR Accelerating Performance	Toyota GR Supra GT4	55	(Fédération Internationale de l'Automobile) Moisey Uretsky (Note: Moisey Uretsky is Russian, but they compete as neutral competitors using the Fédération Internationale de l'Automobile flag as Russian national emblems were banned by the association due to the Russian invasion of Ukraine.)	PA	1, 3–7
(United States) Heart of Racing Team	Aston Martin Vantage AMR GT4	24	(United States) Ian James	PA	1–5, 7
(United States) Heart of Racing Team	Aston Martin Vantage AMR GT4	24	(United States) Gray Newell	PA	1–5, 7
(United States) Privé Motorsports / Topp Racing	McLaren 570S GT4	26	(United Kingdom) Michael O'Brien	PA	1–2
(United States) Privé Motorsports / Topp Racing	McLaren 570S GT4	26	(United States) Thomas Surgent	PA	1–2
(United States) Capstone Motorsports	Mercedes-AMG GT4	32	(United States) Cole Ciraulo	S	3
(United States) Capstone Motorsports	Mercedes-AMG GT4	32	(United States) Kris Wilson	S	3
(United States) Conquest Racing / JWF Motorsports	Mercedes-AMG GT4	34	(Canada) Gavin Sanders	S	All
(United States) Conquest Racing / JWF Motorsports	Mercedes-AMG GT4	34	(United States) Michai Stephens	S	All
(United States) Conquest Racing	Mercedes-AMG GT4	35	(United States) Manny Franco	S	1
(United States) Conquest Racing	Mercedes-AMG GT4	35	(United States) Josh Hurley	S	1
(United States) Conquest Racing	Mercedes-AMG GT4	35	(Brazil) Paulo Carcasci	Am	4–7
(United States) Conquest Racing	Mercedes-AMG GT4	35	(Brazil) Custodio Toledo	Am	4–7
(United States) Bimmerworld Racing	BMW M4 GT4	36	(United States) James Clay	Am	All
(United States) Bimmerworld Racing	BMW M4 GT4	36	(United States) Charlie Postins	Am	All
(United States) Bimmerworld Racing	BMW M4 GT4	82	(United States) Devin Jones	PA	All
(United States) Bimmerworld Racing	BMW M4 GT4	82	(United States) James Walker Jr.	PA	All
(Canada) STR38 Motorsports	BMW M4 GT4	38	(United States) Ramana Lagemann	Am	7
(Canada) STR38 Motorsports	BMW M4 GT4	38	(United States) Robert Mau	Am	7
(United States) Cameron Racing	Mercedes-AMG GT4	39	(United States) Chris Cagnazzi	PA	1, 3–4
(United States) Cameron Racing	Mercedes-AMG GT4	39	(United States) Guy Cosmo	PA	1, 3–4
(United States) Team Saleen	Saleen 1 GT4 Cup	49	(United States) Eric Curran	INV 1–2; PA 3–4	1–4
(United States) Team Saleen	Saleen 1 GT4 Cup	49	(United States) Steve Saleen	INV 1–2; PA 3–4	1–4
(United States) Chouest Povoledo Racing	Aston Martin Vantage AMR GT4	50	(United States) Ross Chouest	PA	All
(United States) Chouest Povoledo Racing	Aston Martin Vantage AMR GT4	50	(Canada) Aaron Povoledo	PA	All
(United States) Auto Technic Racing	BMW M4 GT4	51	(United States) Zack Anderson	S	All
(United States) Auto Technic Racing	BMW M4 GT4	51	(United States) Austen Smith	S	All
(United States) Auto Technic Racing	BMW M4 GT4	52	(United States) John Capestro-Dubets	PA	All
(United States) Auto Technic Racing	BMW M4 GT4	52	(United States) Tom Capizzi	PA	All
(United States) Auto Technic Racing	BMW M4 GT4	53	(Canada) Alex Filsinger	Am	All
(United States) Auto Technic Racing	BMW M4 GT4	53	(United States) Rob Walker	Am	All
(United States) G2 Racing/GSpeed	BMW M4 GT4	59	(United States) Grayson Farischon	S	5
(United States) G2 Racing/GSpeed	BMW M4 GT4	59	(United States) Mike Skeen	S	5
(United States) Dexter Racing	Ginetta G56 GT4	60	(United States) Ben Anderson	Am	1–2
(United States) Dexter Racing	Ginetta G56 GT4	60	(United States) Matt Rivard	Am	1–2
(United States) TGR Dexter Racing	Toyota GR Supra GT4	112	(United States) Ryan Dexter	S	1–5, 7
(United States) TGR Dexter Racing	Toyota GR Supra GT4	112	(United States) Dominic Starkweather	S	1–5, 7
(United States) TGR Smooge Racing	Toyota GR Supra GT4	68	(United States) Kevin Conway	S	All
(United States) TGR Smooge Racing	Toyota GR Supra GT4	68	(United States) John Geesbreght	S	All
(United States) TGR Smooge Racing	Toyota GR Supra GT4	69	(United States) Todd Coleman	PA	1, 4–7
(United States) TGR Smooge Racing	Toyota GR Supra GT4	69	(United States) Aaron Telitz	PA	1, 4–7
(United States) Krugspeed	Toyota GR Supra GT4	72	(United States) Anthony Geraci	Am	3–7
(United States) Krugspeed	Toyota GR Supra GT4	72	(United States) Jaden Lander	Am	3–7
(United States) RENNtech Motorsports	Mercedes-AMG GT4	79	(United States) Chris Gumprecht	PA	1, 3
(United States) RENNtech Motorsports	Mercedes-AMG GT4	79	(Canada) Kyle Marcelli	PA	1, 3
(United States) RENNtech Motorsports	Mercedes-AMG GT4	89	(Brazil) Paulo Carcasci	Am	1
(United States) RENNtech Motorsports	Mercedes-AMG GT4	89	(Brazil) Custodio Toledo	Am	1
(United States) RENNtech Motorsports	Mercedes-AMG GT4	89	(United States) Jon Branam	Am	3–4
(United States) RENNtech Motorsports	Mercedes-AMG GT4	89	(United States) Paul Keibler	Am	3–4
(United States) Rooster Hall Racing	BMW M4 GT4	80	(United States) Johan Schwartz	Am	All
(United States) Rooster Hall Racing	BMW M4 GT4	80	(United States) Todd Brown	Am	All
(United States) Random Vandals Racing	BMW M4 GT4	98	(United States) Al Carter	Am	All
(United States) Random Vandals Racing	BMW M4 GT4	98	(United States) Paul Sparta	Am	All
(United States) Premier Racing	Porsche 718 Cayman GT4 Clubsport	120	(United States) Adam Adelson	PA	All
(United States) Premier Racing	Porsche 718 Cayman GT4 Clubsport	120	(United States) Elliott Skeer	PA	All
(United States) ARG / Rotek Racing	Ford Mustang GT4	124	(Hong Kong) Edgar Lau	PA	1, 3–5, 7
(United States) ARG / Rotek Racing	Ford Mustang GT4	124	(United States) Billy Johnson	PA	1, 4
(United States) ARG / Rotek Racing	Ford Mustang GT4	124	(United States) Mike Skeen	PA	3
(United States) ARG / Rotek Racing	Ford Mustang GT4	124	(United States) Jaden Conwright	PA	5, 7
(United States) Team ACP - Tangerine Associates	BMW M4 GT4	152	(United States) Alex Amine	Am	3, 5
(United States) Team ACP - Tangerine Associates	BMW M4 GT4	152	(United States) Ryan Hall	Am	3, 5
(United States) Indian Summer Racing	Porsche 718 Cayman GT4 RS Clubsport	319	(United States) Francis Selldorff	PA	4, 6
(United States) Indian Summer Racing	Porsche 718 Cayman GT4 RS Clubsport	319	(United States) Travis Washay	PA	4, 6
(United States) BGB Motorsports	Porsche 718 Cayman GT4 RS Clubsport	420	(United States) Thomas Collingwood	Am	6
(United States) BGB Motorsports	Porsche 718 Cayman GT4 RS Clubsport	420	(United States) John Tecce	Am	6
(United States) Regal Motorsports	Porsche 718 Cayman GT4 RS Clubsport	427	(United States) Anthony Bartone	Am	2, 6
(United States) Regal Motorsports	Porsche 718 Cayman GT4 RS Clubsport	427	(United States) Andy Pilgrim	Am	2, 6
(United States) Zelus Motorsports	Aston Martin Vantage AMR GT4	888	(United States) Matt Guiver	Am	1–5
(United States) Zelus Motorsports	Aston Martin Vantage AMR GT4	888	(United States) Sean Whalen	Am	1–5
(Hong Kong) Absolute Racing	Porsche 718 Cayman GT4 RS Clubsport	899	(Germany) Lars Kern	PA	1
(Hong Kong) Absolute Racing	Porsche 718 Cayman GT4 RS Clubsport	899	(Indonesia) Anderson Tanoto	PA	1
(United States) CarBahn with Peregrine Racing	Audi R8 LMS GT4 Evo	930	(United States) Tom Dyer	PA	1, 3, 6
(United States) CarBahn with Peregrine Racing	Audi R8 LMS GT4 Evo	930	(United States) Mark Siegel	PA	1
(United States) CarBahn with Peregrine Racing	Audi R8 LMS GT4 Evo	930	(United States) Steve Dinan	PA	3
(United States) CarBahn with Peregrine Racing	Audi R8 LMS GT4 Evo	930	(United States) Sameer Ghandi	PA	6

Icon	Class
S	Silver Cup
PA	Pro-Am Cup
Am	Am Cup
INV	Invitational

== Race results ==
Bold indicates overall winner

Round		Circuit	Pole position	Silver Winners	Pro/Am Winners	Am Winners
1	R1	(United States) Sonoma	(United States) #34 Conquest Racing / JWF Motorsports	**(United States) #18 RS1**	(United States) #15 BSport Racing	(United States) #36 Bimmerworld Racing
1	R1	(United States) Sonoma	(Canada) Gavin Sanders (United States) Michai Stephens	**(United States) Eric Filgueiras** **(United Kingdom) Stevan McAleer**	(United States) Kenton Koch (United States) Bryan Putt	(United States) James Clay (United States) Charlie Postins
1	R2	(United States) Sonoma	(United States) #18 RS1	**(United States) #18 RS1**	(United States) #15 BSport Racing	(United States) #60 Dexter Racing
1	R2	(United States) Sonoma	(United States) Eric Filgueiras (United Kingdom) Stevan McAleer	**(United States) Eric Filgueiras** **(United Kingdom) Stevan McAleer**	(United States) Kenton Koch (United States) Bryan Putt	(United States) Ben Anderson (United States) Matt Rivard
2	R1	(United States) NOLA	(United States) #18 RS1	**(United States) #18 RS1**	(United States) #120 Premier Racing	(United States) #36 Bimmerworld Racing
2	R1	(United States) NOLA	(United States) Eric Filgueiras (United Kingdom) Stevan McAleer	**(United States) Eric Filgueiras** **(United Kingdom) Stevan McAleer**	(United States) Adam Adelson (United States) Elliott Skeer	(United States) James Clay (United States) Charlie Postins
2	R2	(United States) NOLA	(United States) #18 RS1	**(United States) #18 RS1**	(United States) #120 Premier Racing	**(United States)** #19 NOLASPORT
2	R2	(United States) NOLA	(United States) Eric Filgueiras (United Kingdom) Stevan McAleer	**(United States) Eric Filgueiras** **(United Kingdom) Stevan McAleer**	(United States) Adam Adelson (United States) Elliott Skeer	(United States) Alain Stad (United States) Seth Thomas
3	R1	(United States) Virginia	(United States) #18 RS1	**(United States) #18 RS1**	(United States) #52 Auto Technic Racing	(United States) #36 Bimmerworld Racing
3	R1	(United States) Virginia	(United States) Eric Filgueiras (United Kingdom) Stevan McAleer	**(United States) Eric Filgueiras** **(United Kingdom) Stevan McAleer**	**(United States)** John Capestro-Dubets **(United States)** Tom Capizzi	(United States) James Clay (United States) Charlie Postins
3	R2	(United States) Virginia	(United States) #18 RS1	**(United States) #34 Conquest Racing / JWF Motorsports**	**(United States)** #47 NOLASPORT	(United States) #36 Bimmerworld Racing
3	R2	(United States) Virginia	(United States) Eric Filgueiras (United Kingdom) Stevan McAleer	**(Canada) Gavin Sanders** **(United States) Michai Stephens**	(United States) Jason Hart (United States) Scott Noble	(United States) James Clay (United States) Charlie Postins
4	R1	(United States) Watkins Glen	(United States) #18 RS1	**(United States) #18 RS1**	**(United States)** #24 Heart of Racing Team	(United States) #36 Bimmerworld Racing
4	R1	(United States) Watkins Glen	(United States) Eric Filgueiras (United Kingdom) Stevan McAleer	**(United States) Eric Filgueiras** **(United Kingdom) Stevan McAleer**	**(United States)** Ian James **(United States)** Gray Newell	(United States) James Clay (United States) Charlie Postins
4	R2	(United States) Watkins Glen	(United States) #69 TGR Smooge Racing	**(United States) #18 RS1**	(United States) #52 Auto Technic Racing	(United States) #36 Bimmerworld Racing
4	R2	(United States) Watkins Glen	(United States) Todd Coleman (United States) Aaron Telitz	**(United States) Eric Filgueiras** **(United Kingdom) Stevan McAleer**	**(United States)** John Capestro-Dubets **(United States)** Tom Capizzi	(United States) James Clay (United States) Charlie Postins
5	R1	(United States) Road America	(United States) #18 RS1	**(United States) #18 RS1**	(United States) #120 Premier Racing	(United States) #72 Krugspeed
5	R1	(United States) Road America	(United States) Eric Filgueiras (United Kingdom) Stevan McAleer	**(United States) Eric Filgueiras** **(United Kingdom) Stevan McAleer**	(United States) Adam Adelson (United States) Elliott Skeer	(United States) Anthony Geraci (United States) Jaden Lander
5	R2	(United States) Road America	(United States) #18 RS1	**(United States) #68 TGR Smooge Racing**	(United States) #15 BSport Racing	(United States) #53 Auto Technic Racing
5	R2	(United States) Road America	(United States) Eric Filgueiras (United Kingdom) Stevan McAleer	**(United States) Kevin Conway** **(United States) John Geesbreght**	(United States) Kenton Koch (United States) Bryan Putt	**(Canada)** Alex Filsinger **(United States)** Rob Walker
6	R1	(United States) Sebring	(United States) #18 RS1	**(United States) #34 Conquest Racing / JWF Motorsports**	(United States) #55 TGR Accelerating Performance	(United States) #36 Bimmerworld Racing
6	R1	(United States) Sebring	(United States) Eric Filgueiras (United Kingdom) Stevan McAleer	**(Canada) Gavin Sanders** **(United States) Michai Stephens**	**(United States)** Justin Piscitell (Fédération Internationale de l'Automobile) Moisey Uretsky	(United States) James Clay (United States) Charlie Postins
6	R2	(United States) Sebring	(United States) #18 RS1	**(United States) #18 RS1**	**(United States)** #47 NOLASPORT	(United States) #98 Random Vandals Racing
6	R2	(United States) Sebring	(United States) Eric Filgueiras (United Kingdom) Stevan McAleer	**(United States) Eric Filgueiras** **(United Kingdom) Stevan McAleer**	(United States) Jason Hart (United States) Scott Noble	(United States) Al Carter (United States) Paul Sparta
7	R1	(United States) Indianapolis	(United States) #18 RS1	**(United States) #18 RS1**	**(United States)** #8 Flying Lizard Motorsports	(United States) #20 Carrus Callas Raceteam
7	R1	(United States) Indianapolis	(United States) Eric Filgueiras (United Kingdom) Stevan McAleer	**(United States) Eric Filgueiras** **(United Kingdom) Stevan McAleer**	**(United States)** Andy Lee **(United States)** Elias Sabo	**(United States)** Terry Borcheller **(United States)** Nick Shanny
7	R2	(United States) Indianapolis	(United States) #69 TGR Smooge Racing	**(United States) #18 RS1**	**(United States)** #50 Chouest Povoledo Racing	(United States) #53 Auto Technic Racing
7	R2	(United States) Indianapolis	(United States) Todd Coleman (United States) Aaron Telitz	**(United States) Eric Filgueiras** **(United Kingdom) Stevan McAleer**	**(United States)** Ross Chouest **(Canada)** Aaron Povoledo	**(Canada)** Alex Filsinger **(United States)** Rob Walker

== Championship standings ==
Scoring system

Championship points are awarded for the first ten positions in each race. Entries are required to complete 75% of the winning car's race distance in order to be classified and earn points. Individual drivers are required to participate for a minimum of 25 minutes in order to earn championship points.

Position	**1st**	**2nd**	**3rd**	**4th**	**5th**	**6th**	**7th**	**8th**	**9th**	**10th**
Points	25	18	15	12	10	8	6	4	2	1

=== Driver's championships ===
Pos.	Driver	Team	SON (United States)		NOL (United States)		VIR (United States)		WGL (United States)		ELK (United States)		SEB (United States)		IMS (United States)		Pts.
Pos.	Driver	Team	RC1	RC2	RC1	RC2	RC1	RC2	RC1	RC2	RC1	RC2	RC1	RC2	RC1	RC2	Pts.
Silver Cup
1	(United States) Eric Filgueiras (United Kingdom) Stevan McAleer	(United States) RS1	**1**	**1**	**1**	**1**	**1**	**16**	**1**	**1**	**1**	**Ret**	**2**	**1**	**2**	1	305
2	(Canada) Gavin Sanders (United States) Michai Stephens	(United States) Conquest Racing / JWF Motorsports	2	2	18	22	2	1	2	6	26	5	1	3	6	**2**	244
3	(United States) Kevin Conway (United States) John Geesbreght	(United States) Smooge Racing	Ret	7	4	3	4	3	3	5	29	4	8	9	25	6	191
4	(United States) Zac Anderson (United States) Austen Smith	(United States) Auto Technic Racing	13	6	5	6	6	8	11	27	Ret	7	3	6	7	11	177
5	(United States) Ryan Dexter (United States) Dominic Starkweather	(United States) Dexter Racing	29	9	17	4	33	DNS	9	9	5	9			14	14	132
6	(United States) Cole Ciraulo (United States) Kris Wilson	(United States) Capstone Motorsports	27	Ret			3	Ret									25
7	(United States) Manny Franco (United States) Josh Hurley	(United States) Conquest Racing	24	11													20
8	(United States) Grayson Farischon (United States) Mike Skeen	(United States) G2 Racing/GSpeed									30	DNS					10
-	(United States) Caleb Bacon (United States) Matt Forbush (Note: Drivers who started their first race of the season at the penultimate or final rounds are ineligible for points and invisible as far as awarding points to other drivers.)	(United States) Forbush Performance											24	28	24	7	0
Pro-Am Cup
1	(United States) Jason Hart (United States) Scott Noble	(United States) NOLASPORT	4	5	7	5	Ret	2	7	10	3	8	11	2	5	15	191
2	(United States) Adam Adelson (United States) Elliott Skeer	(United States) Premier Racing	15	10	2	2	8	19	5	8	2	3	31	5	3S	Ret	177
3	(United States) Andy Lee (United States) Elias Sabo	(United States) Flying Lizard Motorsports	5	28	14	Ret	13	5	6	4	6	2	5	4	1	24	161
4	(United States) John Capestro-Dubets (United States) Tom Capizzi	(United States) Auto Technic Racing	11	16	3	8	5	7	30	2	7	23	10	8	9	18	143
5	(United States) Ian James (United States) Gray Newell	(United States) Heart of Racing Team	10	DNS	6	Ret	9	4	4	17	4	DNS			4	12	117
6	(United States) Kenton Koch (United States) Bryan Putt	(United States) BSport Racing	3	3	DNS	Ret	16	22	Ret	7	31	1	9	7			115
7	(United States) Ross Chouest (Canada) Aaron Povoledo	(United States) Chouest Povoledo Racing	Ret	4	25	20	18	24	23	28	10	26	7	11	16	3	77
8	(United States) Justin Piscitell (Fédération Internationale de l'Automobile) Moisey Uretsky	(United States) TGR Accelerating Performance	14	36			12	31	15	18	DNS	18	4	26	13	10	68
9	(Hong Kong) Edgar Lau	(United States) ARG / Rotek Racing	6	24			7	28	31	3	18	10			18	19	53
10	(United States) Devin Jones (United States) James Walker Jr.	(United States) Bimmerworld Racing	12	19	DNS	7	17	13	16	16	15	13	16	12	15	20	53
11	(United States) Tim Horrell	(United States) Fast Track Racing	Ret	21	9	DNS	Ret	18	21	15	23	Ret	12	27	Ret	4	44
12	(United States) Chris Cagnazzi (United States) Guy Cosmo	(United States) Cameron Racing	Ret	WD			28	6	8	11							40
13	(United States) Todd Coleman (United States) Aaron Telitz	(United States) TGR Smooge Racing	9	20					29	Ret	8	6	15	10	20	21	40
14	(United States) Jason Bell (United States) Andrew Davis	(United States) GMG Racing	8	12	Ret	9	Ret	9	26	24	14	20			DNS	Ret	40
15	(United States) Seth Lucas (United States) Matt Plumb	(Japan) TGR Hattori Motorsports	18	17	11	12	10	Ret									30
16	(United States) Billy Johnson	(United States) ARG / Rotek Racing	6	24					31	3							26
17	(Brazil) Raphael Matos	(United States) Fast Track Racing	Ret	21	9	DNS	Ret	18	21	15	23	Ret	12	27			26
18	(United States) Greg Liefooghe (Canada) Damon Surzyshyn	(United States) Fast Track Racing (1–3) (United States) TGR Forbush Performance (5–7)	23	34	11	21	27	29			16	21	18	19	19	17	20
19	(United States) Mike Skeen	(United States) ARG / Rotek Racing					7	28									18
20	(United States) Toby Grahovec	(United States) Fast Track Racing													Ret	4	12
21	(United States) Jay Logan	(United States) GMG Racing											17	23	8	DNS	11
22	(United States) Tom Dyer	(United States) CarBahn with Peregrine Racing	7	DNS			Ret	32					DSQ	DSQ			10
23	(United States) Mark Siegel	(United States) CarBahn with Peregrine Racing	7	DNS													10
24	(United States) Joel Miller	(United States) GMG Racing													8	DNS	10
25	(United Kingdom) Michael O'Brien (United States) Thomas Surgent	(United States) Privé Motorsports / Topp Racing	26	22	20	16											8
26	(France) Alexandre Prémat	(United States) GMG Racing											17	23			8
27	(United States) Chris Gumprecht (Canada) Kyle Marcelli	(United States) RENNtech Motorsports	DNS	Wth			25	10									6
28	(United States) Zane Hodgen (United States) Cameron Lawrence	(United States) Lone Star Racing									9	28					6
29	(United States) Curt Swearingin (Canada) Parker Thompson	(United States) ACI Motorsports													21	Ret	6
30	(United States) Jaden Conwright	(United States) ARG / Rotek Racing									18	10			18	19	5
31	(United States) Francis Selldorff (United States) Travis Washay	(United States) Indian Summer Racing							22	Ret			28	22			3
-	(United States) Sameer Ghandi	(United States) CarBahn with Peregrine Racing											DSQ	DSQ			0
-	(Germany) Lars Kern (Indonesia) Anderson Tanoto	(Hong Kong) Absolute Racing	21	37													0
-	(United States) Steve Dinan	(United States) CarBahn with Peregrine Racing					Ret	32									0
-	(United States) Eric Curran (United States) Steve Saleen	(United States) Team Saleen					32	30	28	29							0
Invitational
-	(United States) Eric Curran (United States) Steve Saleen	(United States) Team Saleen	Ret	30	13	18											-
Am Cup
1	(United States) James Clay (United States) Charlie Postins	(United States) Bimmerworld Racing	16	14	8	Ret	11	11	10	12	12	12	6	Ret	12	8	262
2	(United States) Alain Stad	(United States) NOLASPORT	17	Ret	15	10	14	DNS	14	19	13	17	19	18	30	16	158
3	(Canada) Alex Filsinger (United States) Rob Walker	(United States) Auto Technic Racing	30	35	Ret	14	30	15	13	14	Ret	11	14	Ret	28	5	127
4	(Colombia) Nelson Calle (Colombia) Juan Martínez	(United States) RS1	25	25	10	15	15	25	24	Ret	19	16	13	Ret	17	Ret	113
5	(United States) Terry Borcheller (United States) Nick Shanny	(United States) TGR Accelerating Performance (1) (United States) Carrus Callas Raceteam (2–7)	22	29	26	23	24	20	20	23	17	15	21	17	10	25	110
6	(United States) Anthony Geraci (United States) Jaden Lander	(United States) Krugspeed					23	33†	12	13	11	14	20	25	Ret	Ret	92
7	(United States) Al Carter (United States) Paul Sparta	(United States) Random Vandals Racing	19	18	Ret	Ret	Ret	26	Ret	20	22	22	25	13	26	26	82
8	(United States) Johan Schwartz (United States) Todd Brown	(United States) Rooster Hall Racing	31	31	23	Ret	21	12	27	21	24	19	29	16	29	13	81
9	(United States) Jason Alexandridis (United States) Derek DeBoer	(United States) TRG - The Racer's Group	19	27	22	13	20	Ret	25	26	25	24	23	21	22	Ret	77
10	(Brazil) Paulo Carcasci (Brazil) Custodio Toledo	(United States) RENNtech Motorsports (1) (United States) Conquest Racing (4–7)	28	26					18	25	21	Ret	27	14	11	22	75
11	(United States) Sean Gibbons (United States) Sam Owen	(United States) NOLASPORT	Ret	23	16	Ret	19	14	17	22							65
12	(United States) Seth Thomas	(United States) NOLASPORT			15	10	14	DNS									58
13	(United States) James Rappaport	(United States) TRG - The Racer's Group	32	33	19	19	26	17			27	27	30	24	23	23	48
14	(United States) Matt Travis	(United States) NOLASPORT							14	19	13	17					47
15	(United States) Robert Orcutt	(United States) TRG - The Racer's Group			19	19	26	17									43
16	(United States) Matt Guiver (United States) Sean Whalen	(United States) Zelus Motorsports	Ret	32	24	11	29	21	19	Ret	20	DNS					40
17	(United States) Anthony Bartone (United States) Andy Pilgrim	(United States) Regal Motorsports			21	17							26	20			26
18	(United States) Ben Anderson (United States) Matt Rivard	(United States) Dexter Racing	Ret	13	INF	Ret											25
19	(United States) Thomas Merrill	(United States) NOLASPORT	17	Ret													18
20	(United States) Ramana Lagemann (United States) Robert Mau	(Canada) STR38 Motorsports													27	9	17
21	(United States) Thomas Collingwood (United States) John Tecce	(United States) BGB Motorsports											22	15			16
22	(United States) Kris Wilson	(United States) NOLASPORT											19	18	30	16	11
23	(United States) Jon Branam (United States) Paul Keibler	(United States) RENNtech Motorsports					22	23	NPQ	DNS							10
24	(United States) Todd Hetherington	(United States) TRG - The Racer's Group	32	33							27	27	30	24	23	23	5
25	(United States) Alex Amine (United States) Ryan Hall	(United States) Team ACP - Tangerine Associates					31	27			28	25					1
-	(United States) James Sofronas	(United States) GMG Racing	DNQ	DNS							DNS	DSQ					0
-	(United States) Jay Logan	(United States) GMG Racing									DNS	DSQ					0
-	(United States) Kyle Washington	(United States) GMG Racing	DNQ	DNS													0
Pos	Driver	Team	SON (United States)		NOL (United States)		VIR (United States)		WGL (United States)		ELK (United States)		SEB (United States)		IMS (United States)		Pts.

Key
Colour	Result
Gold	Race winner
Silver	2nd place
Bronze	3rd place
Green	Points finish
Blue	Non-points finish
Blue	Non-classified finish (NC)
Purple	Did not finish (Ret)
Black	Disqualified (DSQ)
Black	Excluded (EX)
White	Did not start (DNS)
White	Race cancelled (C)
White	Withdrew (WD)
Blank	Did not participate

**Bold** – Pole
Italics – Fastest Lap
