= 2019 IMSA Prototype Challenge =

The 2019 IMSA Prototype Challenge is the fourteenth season of the IMSA Lites series and its successors and the third season as the IMSA Prototype Challenge. It began on 5 January at Daytona International Speedway, and concluded on 11 October at Road Atlanta. The IMSA Prototype Challenge series is for future IMSA WeatherTech SportsCar Championship drivers and veteran drivers alike. Entering its 14th season, IMSA Prototype Challenge shifts to a single-class, endurance race format in 2019 with six races held on North America’s most premier road courses. The series will continue to feature the global-spec LMP3 prototypes. The endurance format pairs two-drivers per car in a six race season.

== Series news ==
- NBC Sports Group took over from Fox Sports as the series' official broadcaster.
- Michelin became the new official tire supplier of the series, following the departure of Continental Tire at the end of 2018.
- The Mazda Prototype Challenge (MPC) class was discontinued at the end of 2018.

== Calendar ==
=== Race schedule ===
The 2019 schedule was released on 2 August 2018 and features six rounds.

Rnd	Circuit	Location	Date	Duration
1	(United States) Daytona International Speedway	Daytona Beach, Florida	5 January	3 hours
2	(United States) Sebring International Raceway	Sebring, Florida	14 March	1 hour 45 mins
3	(United States) Mid-Ohio Sports Car Course	Lexington, Ohio	5 May	1 hour 45 mins
4	(Canada) Canadian Tire Motorsport Park	Bowmanville, Ontario	6 July	3 hours
5	(United States) Virginia International Raceway	Alton, Virginia	24 August	1 hour 45 mins
6	(United States) Michelin Raceway Road Atlanta	Braselton, Georgia	11 October	1 hour 45 mins

=== Calendar changes ===
- The round at Barber Motorsports Park was replaced with a round at the Mid-Ohio Sports Car Course.
- The rounds at Daytona International Speedway and Canadian Tire Motorsport Park had their race lengths increased from 1 hour 45 minutes to 3 hours.

== Entry list ==
All teams use the Nissan VK50VE 5.0L V8 engines.

Team	Car	No.	Drivers	Rounds
(Canada) ANSA Motorsports	Ligier JS P3	2	(United States) Jon Brownson	All
(Canada) ANSA Motorsports	Ligier JS P3	2	(Canada) Michal Chlumecky	1, 3–6
(Canada) ANSA Motorsports	Ligier JS P3	2	(United States) Dakota Dickerson	1
(Canada) ANSA Motorsports	Ligier JS P3	2	(United States) Tim George	2
(Canada) ANSA Motorsports	Ligier JS P3	4	(Brazil) Leo Lamelas	All
(Canada) ANSA Motorsports	Ligier JS P3	4	(United States) Neil Alberico	All
(Canada) ANSA Motorsports	Ligier JS P3	13	(United States) Benjamin Waddell	3
(Canada) ANSA Motorsports	Ligier JS P3	13	(France) Jordan Perroy	3
(United States) Jr III Racing	Ligier JS P3	3	(United States) Kris Wilson	5–6
(United States) Performance Tech Motorsports	Ligier JS P3	7	(United States) Blake Mount	All
(United States) Performance Tech Motorsports	Ligier JS P3	7	(Brazil) Júlio Campos	1
(United States) Performance Tech Motorsports	Ligier JS P3	7	(United States) Max Hanratty	2–6
(United States) Performance Tech Motorsports	Ligier JS P3	19	(Canada) Dean Baker	All
(United States) Performance Tech Motorsports	Ligier JS P3	19	(Canada) Bradley Baker	1–2, 4
(United States) Performance Tech Motorsports	Ligier JS P3	19	(United States) Kyle Masson	1, 3–6
(United States) Performance Tech Motorsports	Ligier JS P3	75	(Canada) Cameron Cassels	All
(United States) Performance Tech Motorsports	Ligier JS P3	75	(United States) James French	All
(United States) JDC Motorsports	Norma M30	9	(Australia) Scott Andrews	2–6
(United States) JDC Motorsports	Norma M30	9	(United States) Gerry Kraut	2–6
(United States) Robillard Racing	Norma M30	10	(United States) Joe Robillard	2–6
(United States) Robillard Racing	Norma M30	10	(United States) Kenton Koch	1
(United States) Robillard Racing	Norma M30	10	(United Kingdom) Stevan McAleer	1, 4
(United States) Robillard Racing	Norma M30	43	(United Kingdom) Stevan McAleer	2–3, 5–6
(United States) Simraceway Motorsports	Ligier JS P3	11	(United States) Maurice Smith	1–3, 5
(United States) Simraceway Motorsports	Ligier JS P3	11	(France) Nicolas Rondet	1–3, 5
(United States) Simraceway Motorsports	Ligier JS P3	12	(United States) Kevin Woods	2–3
(United States) Simraceway Motorsports	Ligier JS P3	12	(United States) Tim Moser	2–3
(United States) Alianza/Gilbert Motorsports (United States) Gilbert/Korthoff MotorSports	Norma M30	23	(Canada) Anthony Simone	1–3
(United States) Alianza/Gilbert Motorsports (United States) Gilbert/Korthoff MotorSports	Norma M30	23	(United States) Jason Bell	1
(United States) Alianza/Gilbert Motorsports (United States) Gilbert/Korthoff MotorSports	Norma M30	23	(United States) Mike Skeen	3, 5–6
(United States) Conquest Racing	Ligier JS P3	25	(United States) Ross Chouest	1–2, 5
(United States) Conquest Racing	Ligier JS P3	25	(Canada) Aaron Povoledo	1–2, 5
(United States) Forty 7 Motorsports	Ligier JS P3	25	(United States) Ross Chouest	6
(United States) Forty 7 Motorsports	Ligier JS P3	25	(Canada) Aaron Povoledo	6
(United States) Forty 7 Motorsports	Norma M30	47	(United States) Austin McCusker	All
(United States) Forty 7 Motorsports	Norma M30	47	(Peru) Rodrigo Pflucker	All
(United States) Forty 7 Motorsports	Norma M30	55	(United States) Nikko Reger	All
(United States) Forty 7 Motorsports	Norma M30	55	(United States) Timo Reger	1–3
(United States) Forty 7 Motorsports	Norma M30	55	(United States) Wyatt Schwab	4–6
(United States) Forty 7 Motorsports	Norma M30	74	(United States) Wyatt Schwab	1–2
(United States) Forty 7 Motorsports	Norma M30	74	(United States) Benjamin Waddell	1
(United States) Forty 7 Motorsports	Norma M30	74	(United States) Colin Thompson	2
(United States) Forty 7 Motorsports	Norma M30	74	(Canada) Garett Grist	5–6
(United States) Forty 7 Motorsports	Norma M30	74	(United States) Rob Hodes	5–6
(United States) K2R Motorsports	Ligier JS P3	26	(United Kingdom) Matthew Bell	2
(United States) K2R Motorsports	Ligier JS P3	26	(United States) James McGuire Jr.	2
(United States) K2R Motorsports	Ligier JS P3	51	(United States) Rob Hodes	1–4
(United States) K2R Motorsports	Ligier JS P3	51	(Canada) Garett Grist	1–4
(United States) K2R Motorsports	Ligier JS P3	64	(United States) Naveen Rao	1–5
(United States) K2R Motorsports	Ligier JS P3	64	(United States) Alex Barron	1–3
(United States) K2R Motorsports	Ligier JS P3	64	(United Kingdom) Matthew Bell	4–6
(United States) Sean Creech Motorsports	Ligier JS P3	30	(United States) Naj Husain	6
(United States) Sean Creech Motorsports	Ligier JS P3	30	(United States) Wayne Boyd	6
(United States) Sean Creech Motorsports	Ligier JS P3	33	(United States) Lance Willsey	All
(United States) Sean Creech Motorsports	Ligier JS P3	33	(United Kingdom) Nigel Greensall	1, 4
(United States) Polestar Motor Racing Inc.	Ligier JS P3	40	(United States) Keith Grant	All
(United States) Polestar Motor Racing Inc.	Ligier JS P3	40	(United States) David Grant	All
(United States) Polestar Motor Racing Inc.	Ligier JS P3	40	(United States) Kenton Koch	4
(United States) PR1/Mathiasen Motorsports	Ligier JS P3	52	(United States) Scott Huffaker	2–5
(United States) PR1/Mathiasen Motorsports	Ligier JS P3	52	(United States) Mike Guasch	2
(United States) PR1/Mathiasen Motorsports	Ligier JS P3	52	(United States) Chris Archinaco	3–5
(United States) MLT Motorsports	Ligier JS P3	54	(United States) Dylan Murry	2–6
(United States) MLT Motorsports	Ligier JS P3	54	(United States) David Murry	2
(United States) MLT Motorsports	Ligier JS P3	54	(United States) Dakota Dickerson	3–4, 6
(United States) MLT Motorsports	Ligier JS P3	54	(United States) Skylar Robinson	5
(United States) Wulver Racing	Ligier JS P3	60	(United States) Bruce Hamilton	All
(United States) Wulver Racing	Ligier JS P3	60	(Estonia) Tonis Kasemets	All
(United States) Wulver Racing	Ligier JS P3	60	(Canada) Scott Maxwell	1
(United States) Wulver Racing	Ligier JS P3	60	(United States) Jade Buford	4
(United States) ONE Motorsports	Ligier JS P3	66	(Canada) Will Lin	4
(United States) ONE Motorsports	Ligier JS P3	66	(United States) Mikel Miller	4
(United States) ONE Motorsports	Ligier JS P3	66	(United States) Benjamin Waddell	4
(United States) ONE Motorsports	Ligier JS P3	86	(United States) Dave House	All
(United States) ONE Motorsports	Ligier JS P3	86	(United States) Paul LaHaye	All
(United States) P1 Motorsports	Ligier JS P3	70	(United States) Joel Janco	All
(United States) P1 Motorsports	Ligier JS P3	70	(United States) Jonathan Jorge	All
Entry Lists:

== Results ==
=== Race results ===
Rnd	Circuit	Pole position	Race winners
1	(United States) Daytona	(United States) No. 51 K2R Motorsports	(Canada) No. 4 ANSA Motorsports
1	(United States) Daytona	(Canada) Garett Grist (United States) Rob Hodes	(United States) Neil Alberico (Brazil) Leo Lamelas
2	(United States) Sebring	(United States) No. 47 Forty 7 Motorsports	(United States) No. 43 Robillard Racing
2	(United States) Sebring	(United States) Austin McCuscker (Peru) Rodrigo Pflucker	(United Kingdom) Stevan McAleer
3	(United States) Mid-Ohio	(United States) No. 23 Gilbert/Korthoff MotorSports	(United States) No. 54 MLT Motorsports
3	(United States) Mid-Ohio	(Canada) Anthony Simone (United States) Mike Skeen	(United States) Dylan Murry (United States) Dakota Dickerson
4	(Canada) Mosport	(United States) No. 10 Robillard Racing	(United States) No. 47 Forty 7 Motorsports
4	(Canada) Mosport	(United Kingdom) Stevan McAleer (United States) Joe Robillard	(United States) Austin McCusker (Peru) Rodrigo Pflucker
5	(United States) Virginia	(United States) No. 43 Robillard Racing	(United States) No. 43 Robillard Racing
5	(United States) Virginia	(United Kingdom) Stevan McAleer	(United Kingdom) Stevan McAleer
6	(United States) Road Atlanta	(United States) No. 43 Robillard Racing	(United States) No. 23 Gilbert/Korthoff MotorSports
6	(United States) Road Atlanta	(United Kingdom) Stevan McAleer	(United States) Mike Skeen

=== Points system ===
Position	1	2	3	4	5	6	7	8	9	10	11	12	13	14	15	16	17	18	19	20	21	22	23	24	25	26	27	28	29	30
Race	35	32	30	28	26	25	24	23	22	21	20	19	18	17	16	15	14	13	12	11	10	9	8	7	6	5	4	3	2	1

=== Drivers' Championship ===
==== Overall ====
Pos.	Driver(s)	DAY (United States)	SEB (United States)	MOH (United States)	MOS (Canada)	VIR (United States)	ATL (United States)	Points
1	(United States) Austin McCusker (Peru) Rodrigo Pflucker	2	**2**	4	1	8	6	175
2	(United Kingdom) Stevan McAleer	17	1	15	**10**	**1**	**4**	149
3	(United States) Neil Alberico (Brazil) Leo Lamelas	1	10	2	5	22	5	149
4	(United States) Bruce Hamilton (Estonia) Tonis Kasemets	3	17	3	11	10	7	139
5	(United States) Dylan Murry		5	1	4	4	18	130
6	(Canada) Cameron Cassels (United States) James French	5	6	23	6	6	10	130
7	(United States) Blake Mount	14	4	9	17	7	9	127
8	(United States) David Grant (United States) Keith Grant	19	8	8	8	5	11	127
9	(Canada) Dean Baker	7	20	12	13	3	21	112
10	(United States) Max Hanratty		4	9	17	7	9	110
11	(United States) Joel Janco (United States) Jonathan Jorge	8	11	16	16	14	15	106
12	(United States) Kyle Masson	7		12	13	3	21	101
13	(Canada) Garett Grist (United States) Rob Hodes	**12**	19	17	7	15	20	96
14	(United States) Naveen Rao	6	7	7	18	23		94
15	(United States) Lance Willsey	11	12	21	19	16	14	93
16	(United States) Dakota Dickerson	18		1	4		18	89
17	(United States) Wyatt Schwab	13	9		12	20	12	89
18	(United States) Joe Robillard		13	13	**10**	17	13	89
19	(Australia) Scott Andrews (United States) Gerry Kraut		21	5	3	21	19	88
20	(United States) Jon Brownson	18	23	19	9	13	16	88
21	(United States) Nikko Reger	10	25	22	12	20	12	85
22	(United States) Dave House (United States) Paul LaHaye	16	16	18	15	19	17	85
23	(United States) Mike Skeen			**14**		2	1	84
24	(United Kingdom) Matt Bell		3		18	23	2	83
25	(United States) Scott Huffaker		22	11	2	11		81
26	(Canada) Michal Chlumecky	18		19	9	13	16	80
27	(United States) Alex Barron	6	7	7				73
28	(United States) Chris Archinaco			11	2	11		72
29	(United States) Nico Rondet (United States) Maurice Smith	4	24	10	18			69
30	(United States) Ross Chouest (Canada) Aaron Povoledo	9	14			12	22	67
31	(United States) Benjamin Waddell	13		6	14			60
32	(Canada) Bradley Baker	7	20		13			53
33	(Canada) Anthony Simone	15	18	**14**				46
34	(United States) Kris Wilson					9	8	45
35	(United States) Kenton Koch	17			8			37
36	(United States) Timo Reger	10	25	22				36
37	(United Kingdom) Nigel Greensall	11			19			32
38	(Canada) Scott Maxwell	3						30
39	(United States) James McGuire		3					30
40	(United States) Naj Husain (United States) Wayne Boyd						3	30
41	(United States) Skylar Robinson					4		28
42	(United States) Tim Moser (United States) Kevin Woods		15	20				27
43	(United States) David Murry		5					26
44	(France) Jordan Perroy			6				25
45	(United States) Colin Thompson		9					22
46	(United States) Jade Buford				11			20
47	(Brazil) Júlio Campos	14						17
48	(Canada) Will Lin (United States) Mikel Miller				14			17
49	(United States) Jason Bell	15						16
50	(United States) Mike Guasch		22					9
51	(United States) Tim George		23					8
Pos.	Driver(s)	DAY (United States)	SEB (United States)	MOH (United States)	MOS (Canada)	VIR (United States)	ATL (United States)	Points

Colour	Result
Gold	Winner
Silver	Second place
Bronze	Third place
Green	Points classification
Blue	Non-points classification
Blue	Non-classified finish (NC)
Purple	Retired, not classified (Ret)
Red	Did not qualify (DNQ)
Red	Did not pre-qualify (DNPQ)
Black	Disqualified (DSQ)
White	Did not start (DNS)
White	Withdrew (WD)
White	Race cancelled (C)
Blank	Did not practice (DNP)
Blank	Did not arrive (DNA)
Blank	Excluded (EX)

**Bold** - Pole position
Italics - Fastest lap

==== Bronze Cup ====
Pos.	Driver(s)	DAY (United States)	SEB (United States)	MOH (United States)	MOS (Canada)	VIR (United States)	ATL (United States)	Points
1	(United States) Joel Janco (United States) Jonathan Jorge	1	**1**	**2**	3	3	4	190
2	(United States) Lance Willsey	**2**	2	6	**4**	4	3	175
3	(United States) Dave House (United States) Paul LaHaye	3	5	3	2	6	6	168
4	(United States) Jon Brownson		7	4	1	2	5	145
5	(United States) Joe Robillard		3	1		5	2	123
6	(Canada) Michal Chlumecky			4	1	2	5	121
7	(United States) Kris Wilson					**1**	**1**	70
8	(United Kingdom) Nigel Greensall	**2**			**4**			32
9	(United States) Tim Moser (United States) Kevin Woods		4	5				54
10	(Canada) Bradley Baker (Canada) Dean Baker		6					25
11	(United States) Tim George		7					24
Pos.	Driver(s)	DAY (United States)	SEB (United States)	MOH (United States)	MOS (Canada)	VIR (United States)	ATL (United States)	Points

=== Team's Championship ===
Pos.	Team	DAY (United States)	SEB (United States)	MOH (United States)	MOS (Canada)	VIR (United States)	ATL (United States)	Points
1	#47 Forty 7 Motorsports	2	**2**	4	1	8	6	175
2	#4 ANSA Motorsports	1	10	2	5	22	5	149
3	#60 Wulver Racing	3	17	3	11	10	7	139
4	#54 MLT Motorsports		5	1	6	4	18	130
5	#75 Performance Tech Motorsports	5	6	23	6	6	10	130
6	#7 Performance Tech Motorsports	14	4	9	17	7	9	127
7	#40 Polestar Motor Racing Inc.	19	8	8	8	5	11	127
8	#64 K2R Motorsports	6	7	7	18	23	2	126
9	#43 Robillard Racing		1	15		**1**	**4**	114
10	#23 Gilbert/Korthoff Motorsports	15	18	**14**		2	1	113
11	#19 Performance Tech Motorsports	7	20	12	13	3	21	112
12	#70 PR1/Mathiasen Motorsports	8	11	16	16	14	15	106
13	#10 Robillard Racing	17	13	13	**10**	17	13	103
14	#33 Sean Creech Motorsports	11	12	21	19	16	14	93
15	#9 JDC MotorSports		21	5	3	21	19	88
16	#2 ANSA Motorsports	18	23	19	9	13	16	88
17	#55 Forty 7 Motorsports	10	25	22	12	20	12	85
18	#86 ONE Motorsports	16	16	18	15	19	17	85
19	#52 PR1/Mathiasen Motorsports		22	11	2	11		81
20	#11 Simraceway Motorsports	4	24	10		18		69
21	#51 K2R Motorsports	**12**	19	17	7			69
22	#25 Forty 7 Motorsports	9	14			12	22	67
23	#74 Forty 7 Motorsports	13	9			15	20	67
24	#3 Jr III Racing					9	8	45
25	#26 K2R Motorsports		3					30
26	#30 Sean Creech Motorsports						3	30
27	#12 Simraceway Motorsports		15	20				27
28	#13 ANSA Motorsports			6				25
29	#66 ONE Motorsports				14			17
Pos.	Team	DAY (United States)	SEB (United States)	MOH (United States)	MOS (Canada)	VIR (United States)	ATL (United States)	Points
