= Kenton Koch =

American racing driver

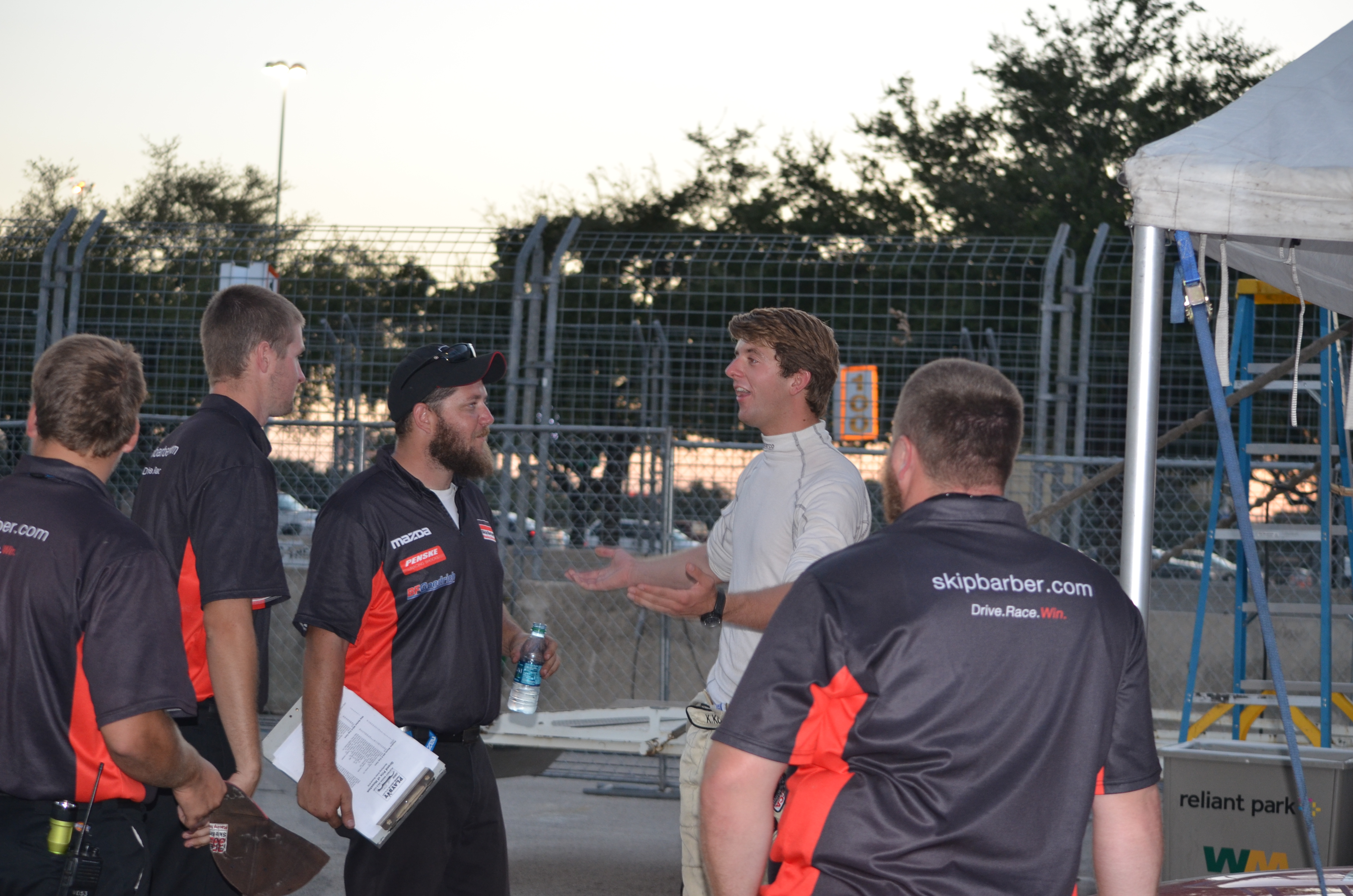
- Koch (in white) in 2013.
- Nationality: (United States) American
- Born: Kenton Lee Koch; July 5, 1994 (age 32) Glendora, California, United States

GT4 America Series career
- Debut season: 2020
- Current team: Random Vandals Racing
- Categorisation: FIA Silver (until 2025); FIA Gold (2026–)
- Car number: 92
- Former teams: BSport Racing
- Starts: 52
- Wins: 8
- Podiums: 26
- Poles: 2
- Fastest laps: 5

Championship titles
- 2013 2014 2015 2025: Skip Barber MazdaSpeed Challenge; SCCA Pro Racing MX-5 Cup; Cooper Tires Prototype Lites - L1; GT4 America Series - Silver Class; GT World Challenge America - Pro Class
- Statistics up to date as of 25 September 2026.

Kenton Lee Koch (born July 5, 1994) is an American racing driver who competes in the GT4 America Series, Michelin Pilot Challenge, and IMSA SportsCar Championship.

== Career ==
=== Early career ===
Koch's interest in motorsport began at an incredibly young age, through avenues such as karting and watching his father compete in off-road racing competitions on the weekends. At the age of six, Koch attended the LA Auto Show with his father, where he was introduced to karting. Although he was too young to compete at the time, once Koch turned eight, his parents presented him with his own kart.

=== Skip Barber and Mazda MX-5 Cup ===
Koch's transition into cars began in 2010. He himself stated that karting wasn't initially a career path, but after a strong performance in a Skip Barber-promoted karting shootout, Koch earned a half-scholarship to compete in the Skip Barber Western Regional Series. During the opening weekend of the season at Laguna Seca, Koch claimed two podiums and a race victory, leaving the event joint-top of the points standings alongside Thomas McGregor. However, Koch wouldn't compete beyond the first weekend. In 2011, Koch graduated to the Skip Barber Summer Series, where he would claim three podiums and one race win through 12 races, taking seventh in the championship.

2012 saw Koch transition into sports car racing, taking part in the Skip Barber-sanctioned Skip Barber Mazdaspeed Challenge, which ran as a support series to the overall SCCA Pro Racing Mazda MX-5 Cup. He had a strong rookie season, claiming 17 victories through 20 races and taking a podium in every race. Owing to his championship success and subsequent funding, Koch advanced to the Pro Challenge for 2013 – the top class of the Skip Barber Mazda series. It was another successful season, where Koch claimed nine victories through 11 races, setting five track records and claiming his second consecutive championship. His championship title came with a $75,000 scholarship, as well as acceptance into the Mazda Sports Car Racing Academy. Koch also took on a coaching role at Skip Barber Racing School's Monterey, California facility.

For 2014, Koch utilized his scholarship to compete in the SCCA Pro Racing Mazda MX-5 Cup. He joined Alara Racing, who had claimed the most recent series title with driver Christian Szymczak. Koch once again enjoyed a strong season, winning six of the first eight races, including a weekend sweep at Canadian Tire Motorsport Park, culminating in a championship title at year's end – his third in three years. At the conclusion of the season, Koch traveled to Auto Club Speedway to take part in the Team USA Scholarship shootout. At the conclusion of the season, Koch traveled to Mexico to take part in the FIA Institute Young Driver Excellence Academy.

=== Prototype racing (2015–2017) ===
Following his MX-5 Cup championship in 2014, Koch graduated to the next level of the Mazda pyramid for 2015, taking part in the Mazda Prototype Lites championship thanks to a Mazda-provided scholarship. In his first season of prototype racing, Koch once enjoyed a successful season, winning the opening race at Sebring and sweeping the weekend at Road America en route to 11 race victories and a season championship. Koch's victory tally tied Tristan Nunez's single-season Prototype Lites wins record. At the conclusion of the season, Koch set his eyes on a drive in the IMSA SportsCar Championship for 2016, owing to his $100,000 prize package for winning the 2015 championship.

Koch began the 2017 season with a part-time IMSA drive, competing in the Prototype Challenge class with JDC-Miller MotorSports, his IMSA Prototype Lites employer. JDC had already confirmed Mikhail Goikhberg and Stephen Simpson as their full-time drivers for the season, restricting Koch to an Endurance Cup-only role for 2016. His first race of the season, the 2016 24 Hours of Daytona, saw the entry claim the PC class victory. Koch himself rebounded from an earlier incident to bring the car home in the final stint. Following the race, Koch claimed that he'd "never driven so slow in [his] life" during that final stint, as he aimed to maintain the multiple-lap gap the entry had to the second PC class car. After returning to the team for a fourth-place finish at the 12 Hours of Sebring, Koch was left without a seat for the immediate future. For the final two Endurance Cup events of the season, Koch joined fellow Prototype Challenge competitors Performance Tech Motorsports, joining full-time drivers James French and Kyle Marcelli. After a runner-up finish at Watkins Glen, Koch entered the final round of the season at Road Atlanta in contention for the Endurance Cup title in the PC class. However, despite a second place finish in the season finale, Koch finished runner-up in the championship.

For 2017, Koch returned to the newly-christened IMSA Prototype Challenge as his principal drive for the season. From 11 races, Koch claimed ten podiums and seven race victories, including his first race of the season at Barber alongside weekend sweeps at Mosport, Trois-Rivières, and Road Atlanta. However, as he didn't compete in the opening round of the season – a double-header at Sebring – Koch fell eight points short of champion Colin Thompson and would settle for second in the championship. Although the series was a step down from the IMSA SportsCar Championship, Koch viewed the season as an opportunity to "stay current," maintaining his presence in the IMSA-sanctioned paddock. Koch also supplemented his 2017 program with one-off events in the Le Mans Cup, where he paired with Joël Janco in a Ligier JS P3, the IMSA SportsCar Championship, where he featured in PR1/Mathiasen Motorsports' lineup for the Detroit event, and the Pirelli World Challenge, where he and George Kurtz claimed pole for the SprintX GTS Pro-Am event at Mosport before retiring.

=== Coaching and customer drives (2018–present) ===
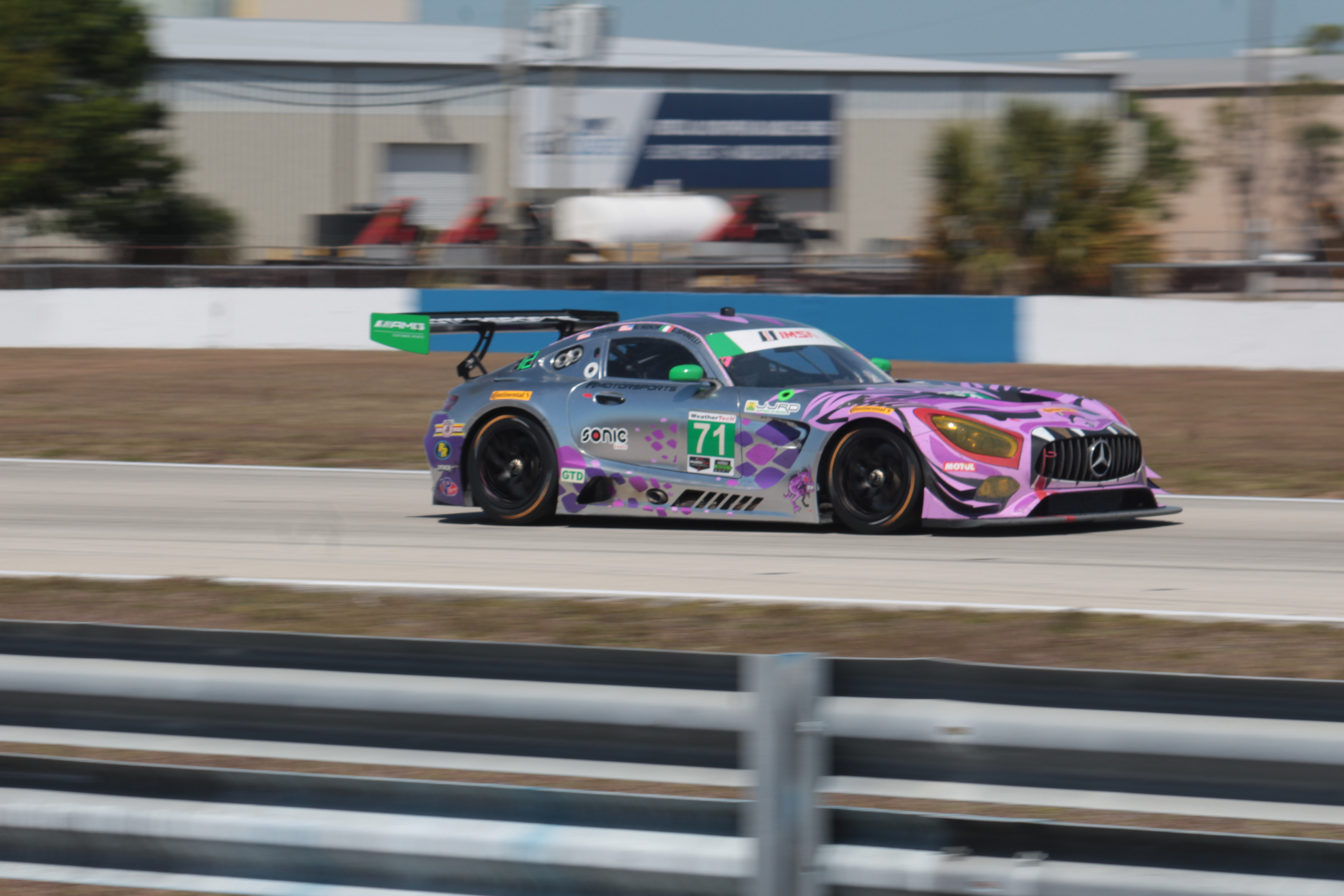
Koch's Mercedes-AMG GT3 at the 2018 12 Hours of Sebring.

Koch's 2018 season began again at Daytona, where he embarked on a pair of programs for P1 Motorsports. Koch took on a full-time drive alongside Janco in the 2018 IMSA Prototype Challenge, with the entry capturing a season-best sixth place finish in the opening race of the season. Koch also appeared for the team's IMSA SportsCar Championship effort in the first two races of the season, with the team finished 12th in the GTD class at Daytona, then 18th at Sebring. Koch's final 2018 program involved a part-time drive in the 2018 Continental Tire SportsCar Challenge, where he joined Tom O'Gorman behind the wheel of an Audi RS 3 LMS TCR. After making their debut mid-season at Watkins Glen, the duo claimed race victories at Virginia and Road Atlanta before season's end.

2019 saw Koch's full-time program revolve around the Michelin Pilot Challenge, where he took on a full-time drive in the GS class for eEuroparts.com Rowe Racing, driving alongside Tyler Cooke. Through seven races before the team folded, Koch claimed a sole pole position at Mid-Ohio, with the duo finishing 18th in the GS championship. Koch also took part in one-off appearances with Robillard Racing and Polestar Motor Racing in the IMSA Prototype Challenge during 2019.

Koch teamed up with driver coaching client Bryan Putt for the 2020 season, taking part in the 2020 GT4 America Series SprintX season in the Pro-Am Cup with BSport Racing. As the team was competing in Aston Martin machinery, Koch also entered the Aston Martin Racing Driver Academy, with the winner receiving factory support for the 2021 season. Koch returned to the academy in 2021 and 2022, although wasn't selected for factory support during any of the three seasons. Koch and Putt claimed seven class podiums over the course of the 2020 season, including five straight between the second race at Sonoma and the third race at Road America, finishing fifth in the class championship.

Koch returned to BSport in 2021, finally breaking through for the team's first race victory in GT4 America at VIR. The team would claim five total podiums that season, finishing second in the Pro-Am cup to Nolasport's Jason Hart and Matt Travis. Koch also competed in the 2021 24 Hours of Daytona with Mühlner Motorsport in the LMP3 class, driving alongside Moritz Kranz, Stevan McAleer, and Laurents Hörr. The team won the 100-minute qualifying race with Hörr and Kranz at the wheel, and set the fastest lap in their class en route to a third-place finish in the 24-hour event. Koch also completed one-offs in the IMSA Prototype Challenge, driving for One Motorsports, and the 24H Series, where he won the GTX class of the 2021 24 Hours of Sebring driving for Leipert Motorsport. At the end of the season, Koch traveled to Bahrain to take part in the WEC Rookie Test, driving an Aston Martin Vantage GTE.

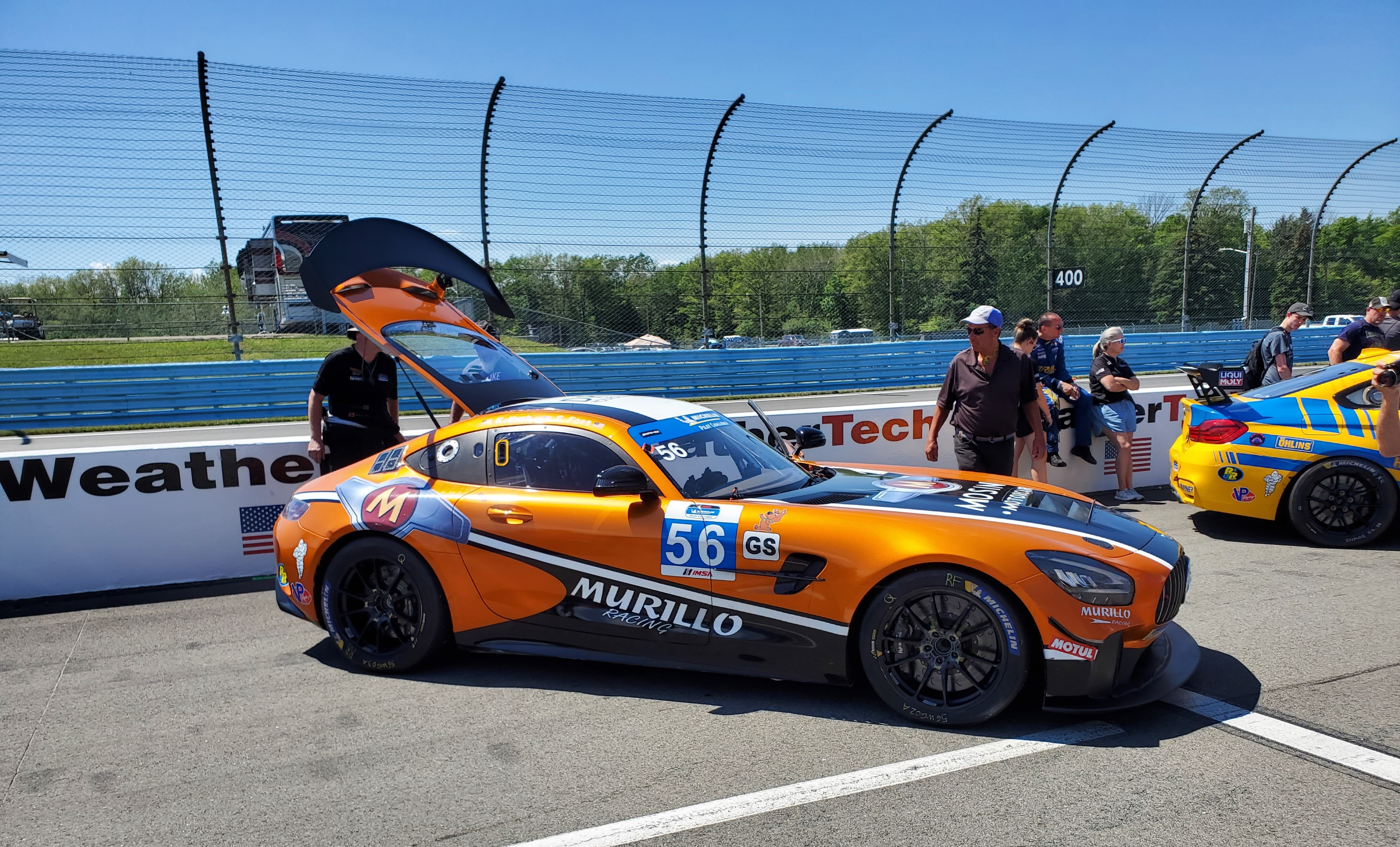
Koch's Mercedes-AMG GT4 at Watkins Glen in 2022.

2022 saw Koch once again take part in a number of GT4-based series. He once again continued with BSport Racing, claiming three class victories over nine races – including a weekend sweep at Sonoma – and finishing sixth in the Pro-Am championship. Koch also debuted in the GT4 European Series during 2022, driving alongside Dutch driver Thijmen Nabuurs in a Silver Cup entry fielded by Team Spirit Racing. The duo only competed in the first four rounds, finishing a season-high sixth at Paul Ricard. Their 43 championship points earned them a tenth-place finish in the Silver Cup classification. Koch's most prolific 2022 program took place in the Michelin Pilot Challenge. Koch took part in a handful of races alongside GS championship hopeful Eric Foss, after his scheduled co-driver Jeff Mosing suffered a rib injury. Koch claimed the GS-class pole in both of his first two races with the team, the latter of which ended in a class victory for himself and Foss at Mid-Ohio. The duo claimed another victory later in the season at Road America, completing Koch's run in the championship.

In 2023, Koch returned to the IMSA SportsCar Championship, taking part in the Michelin Endurance Cup as Team Korthoff Motorsports' third driver. With BSport shutting down after the 2022 season, Koch also changed teams for the 2023 GT4 America Series season, joining Random Vandals Racing. Koch also took part in select Michelin Pilot Challenge events for the team. In GT4 competition, Koch and co-driver Kevin Boehm claimed three race victories and seven additional podium finishes, ending the season third in the Silver Cup classification.

=== BSport Racing ===
Koch and his wife, Dani, formed BSport Racing in 2020, designed to support Koch's driver coaching client Bryan Putt. The team was initially born out of the ashes of eEuroparts.com Rowe Racing's TCR operation, with whom Putt had been leading the DSG class of the 2019 TC America Series before the team's closure near the end of the season. The team moved to the GT4 America Series in 2020, partnering with CSJ Motorsports to field an Aston Martin Vantage AMR GT4 in the Pro-Am class. Following the 2022 season, after several seasons of competition in GT4 America, the team ceased operations.

=== Sim racing ===
Throughout his career, Koch has used sim racing to prepare for real-world events, as well as for fun. During the hiatus caused by the COVID-19 pandemic, Koch took part in a number of virtual racing series, including the IMSA iRacing Pro Series and SRO America's GT Rivals series. On the IMSA side, he claimed victory in the Pro Series event at Virginia International Raceway after a race-long battle with Jesse Krohn.

== Personal life ==
During his racing career, Koch attended California State University, Fullerton, initially majoring in mechanical engineering before shifting to a business focus. Koch stated that his education was "just as important as racing," and that it assisted him off-track in the racing world.

Since 2014, Koch has carried a charm in his car of clay animation character Gumby. Early in his career, Koch donned a Gumby-inspired race suit to promote Gumby Fest, held in his hometown of Glendora, California.

In 2014, Koch's mother was listed for a heart transplant, and officially underwent surgery in 2015. As a result, Koch partnered with Donate Life America, whose logo would adorn his racing cars.

In association with Mazda Motorsports, Cal State Fullerton, and Project Yellow Light, Koch took part in a driver safety campaign with local California high school students in 2017.

== Racing record ==
=== Career summary ===
Season	Series	Team	Races	Wins	Poles	F/Laps	Podiums	Points	Position
2010	Skip Barber Western Regional Series		2	1	1	1	2	?	?
2011	Skip Barber Summer Series		12	1	0	1	3	?	7th
2012	Skip Barber Mazdaspeed Challenge		20	17	9	?	20	?	**1st**
2013	Skip Barber Mazdaspeed Pro Challenge		12	9	11	?	10	689	**1st**
2013	Continental Tire Sports Car Challenge - ST	i-Moto	2	0	0	0	0	33	59th
2014	SCCA Pro Racing Mazda MX-5 Cup	Alara Racing	12	6	9	3	10	724	**1st**
2015	Cooper Tires Prototype Lites - L1	JDC MotorSports	14	11	9	10	14	272	**1st**
2016	IMSA SportsCar Championship - Prototype Challenge	JDC-Miller MotorSports	2	1	0	0	1	131	11th
2016	IMSA SportsCar Championship - Prototype Challenge	Performance Tech Motorsports	2	0	0	0	2	131	11th
2017	IMSA Prototype Challenge - LMP3	P1 Motorsports	11	7	6	3	10	209	**2nd**
2017	Le Mans Cup - LMP3	Duqueine Engineering	2	0	0	0	0	5	29th
2017	IMSA SportsCar Championship - Prototype	PR1/Mathiasen Motorsports	1	0	0	0	0	21	40th
2017	Pirelli World Challenge - SprintX - GTS Pro-Am	GMG Racing	1	0	1	0	0	0	NC
2018	Continental Tire SportsCar Challenge - Touring Car	eEuroparts.com Racing	6	2	0	0	4	186	6th
2018	IMSA Prototype Challenge - LMP3	P1 Motorsports	6	0	0	0	0	118	11th
2018	IMSA SportsCar Championship - GTD	P1 Motorsports	2	0	0	0	0	32	48th
2019	Michelin Pilot Challenge - GS	eEuroparts.com Rowe Racing	7	0	1	0	0	135	18th
2019	IMSA Prototype Challenge - LMP3	Robillard Racing	1	0	0	0	0	37	35th
2019	IMSA Prototype Challenge - LMP3	Polestar Motor Racing Inc.	1	0	0	0	0	37	35th
2020	GT4 America Series - SprintX - Pro-Am	BSport Racing	15	0	0	2	7	161	5th
2021	GT4 America Series - Pro-Am	BSport Racing	14	1	0	1	5	158	**2nd**
2021	IMSA Prototype Challenge - LMP3-1	One Motorsports	1	0	0	0	0	250	28th
2021	IMSA SportsCar Championship - LMP3	Mühlner Motorsports America	1	0	1	1	1	0	NC
2021	24H Series - GTX	Leipert Motorsport	1	1	1	1	1	?	?
2022	GT4 America Series - Pro-Am	BSport Racing	9	3	1	0	3	115	6th
2022	GT4 European Series - Silver	Team Spirit Racing	8	0	1	0	0	43	10th
2022	Michelin Pilot Challenge - GS	Murillo Racing	5	2	2	0	2	1300	24th
2023	GT4 America Series - Silver	Random Vandals Racing	14	3	1	2	10	227	**3rd**
2023	Michelin Pilot Challenge - GS	Random Vandals Racing	5	0	0	0	1	910	25th
2023	IMSA SportsCar Championship - GTD	Team Korthoff Motorsports	4	0	0	1	0	897	32nd
2023	GT World Challenge America - Pro	TR3 Racing	2	2	1	0	2	50	7th
2024	IMSA SportsCar Championship - GTD	Korthoff/Preston Motorsports	2	0	0	0	0	403*	13th*
2024	Michelin Pilot Challenge - GS	Team ACP by Random Vandals	6	0	0	0	0	1000	25th
2024	GT4 America Series - Silver	CrowdStrike Racing by Random Vandals	13	3	0	3	9	231	**2nd**
2024	GT World Challenge America - Pro	Random Vandals Racing	5	0	1	1	1	38	8th
2025	IMSA SportsCar Championship - GTD	Korthoff Competition Motors	5	0	1	1	1	2908	**2nd**
2025	IMSA SportsCar Championship - GTD	Triarsi Competizione	5	1	0	0	3	2908	**2nd**
2025	GT4 America Series - Silver	CrowdStrike Racing by Random Vandals	13	7	0	2	10	265	**1st**
2025	GT World Challenge America - Pro	Random Vandals Racing	13	6	7	6	11	283.5	**1st**
2026	IMSA SportsCar Championship - GTD	Triarsi Competizione	5	0	0	1	1	1264	26th
2026	GT4 America Series - Pro-Am	Random Vandals Racing	13	6	1	1	9	241	**1st**

^{*} Season still in progress.

=== Complete WeatherTech SportsCar Championship results ===
(key) (Races in bold indicate pole position) (Races in italics indicate fastest lap)

Year	Team	Class	Make	Engine	1	2	3	4	5	6	7	8	9	10	11	Rank	Points
2016	JDC-Miller MotorSports	PC	Oreca FLM09	Chevrolet LS3 6.2 L V8	DAY; 1	SEB; 4	LBH	LGA	BEL							11th	131
2016	Performance Tech Motorsports	PC	Oreca FLM09	Chevrolet LS3 6.2 L V8						WGL; 2	MOS	LIM	ELK	AUS	PET; 2	11th	131
2017	PR1/Mathiasen Motorsports	P	Ligier JS P217	Gibson GK428 4.2 L V8	DAY	SEB	LBH	COA	DET; 10	WGL	MOS	ELK	LGA	PET		40th	21
2018	P1 Motorsports	GTD	Mercedes-AMG GT3	Mercedes-AMG M159 6.2 L V8	DAY; 12	SEB; 18	MOH	BEL	WGL	MOS	LIM	ELK	VIR	LGA	PET	48th	32
2021	Mühlner Motorsports America	LMP3	Duqueine D-08	Nissan VK56DE 5.6 L V8	**DAY**; 3	SEB	MOH	WGL	WGL	ELK	PET					NC	0
2023	Team Korthoff Motorsports	GTD	Mercedes-AMG GT3 Evo	Mercedes-AMG M159 6.2 L V8	DAY; 15	SEB; 10	LBH	MON	WGL; 12	MOS	LIM	ELK	VIR	IMS	PET; 6	32nd	869
2024	Korthoff/Preston Motorsports	GTD	Mercedes-AMG GT3 Evo	Mercedes-AMG M159 6.2 L V8	DAY; 5	SEB; 21	LBH	LGA	WGL; 11	MOS	**ELK**; 7	VIR; 1	**IMS**; 3	PET; 19		20th	1773
2025	Korthoff Competition Motors	GTD	Mercedes-AMG GT3 Evo	Mercedes-AMG M159 6.2 L V8	DAY; 9	SEB; 18	LBH; 6	**LGA**; 4	WGL; 3							2nd	2908
2025	Triarsi Competizione	GTD	Ferrari 296 GT3	Ferrari F163CE 3.0 L Turbo V6						MOS; 7	ELK; 1	VIR; 2	IMS; 7	PET; 2		2nd	2908
2026	Triarsi Competizione	GTD	Ferrari 296 GT3 Evo	Ferrari F163CE 3.0 L Turbo V6	DAY; 7	SEB; 14	LBH	LGA	WGL; 8	MOS	ELK; 2	VIR	IMS	PET; 9		26th	1264

^{*} Season still in progress.

Sporting positions
Preceded by Bryan Hixon	Skip Barber Mazdaspeed Pro Challenge; Champion; 2013	Succeeded by Drake Kemper
Preceded by Christian Szymczak	Global Mazda MX-5 Cup; Champion; 2014	Succeeded by John Dean II
Preceded by Misha Goikhberg	IMSA Prototype Challenge; L1 Champion; 2015	Succeeded by Clark Toppe
