= Stevan McAleer =

British racing driver

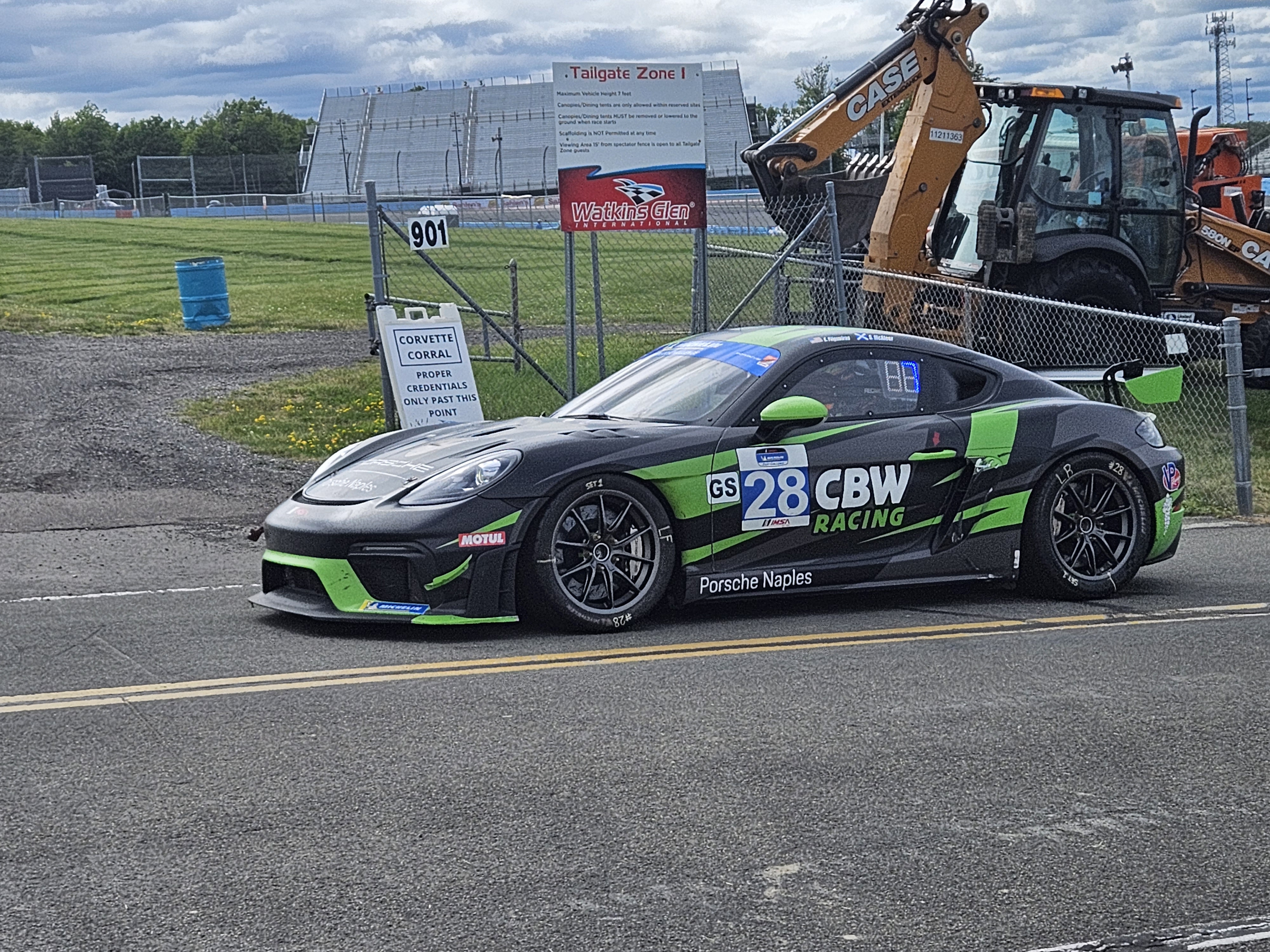
- Nationality: (United Kingdom) British
- Born: Stevan Gordon McAleer; 28 August 1984 (age 42) Rutherglen, Scotland

IMSA SportsCar Championship career
- Debut season: 2021
- Current team: MLT Motorsports
- Categorisation: FIA Silver (until 2022); FIA Gold (2023–)
- Car number: 54
- Former teams: Team Korthoff Motorsports; Mühlner Motorsport; Forty7 Motorsports
- Starts: 15
- Wins: 0
- Podiums: 3
- Poles: 2
- Fastest laps: 1

Previous series
- 2017–2018, 2020–2021 2012 2010 2007–2009: Lamborghini Super Trofeo North America; Global MX-5 Cup; F2000 Championship Series; BFGoodrich/Skip Barber National

Championship titles
- 2023 2022 2019 2015 2012: GT World Challenge America - Pro; GT4 America Series – Silver; GT4 America East – Pro-Am; Continental Tire SportsCar Challenge – ST; Global MX-5 Cup
- Statistics up to date as of 16 October 2023.

Stevan Gordon McAleer (born 28 August 1984) is a British racing driver who competes in the IMSA SportsCar Championship, GT World Challenge Europe, and Michelin Pilot Challenge.

== Career ==
=== Early career ===
McAleer was introduced to motorsports at the age of ten, visiting a karting track in his hometown of Glasgow with friends. At the age of 11, he was gifted a go-kart by his father, before beginning to race karts competitively the following year. However, a move to car racing was postponed due to a lack of funding. After winning the Scottish Karting Championship four times, he moved to the United States in 2005 to pursue additional racing opportunities. While browsing Autosport, McAleer came across a scholarship which granted entry into the Skip Barber Regional Championship, paving the way for that move. In his opening season in the Eastern Regional Championship, McAleer finished second in points, tallying seven wins and 14 podiums. For 2007, he moved to the Skip Barber National Championship, tallying a fourth-place points finish in his first season. After adding a fifth-place finish in his second season, McAleer concluded his stint in the series with a part-time campaign in 2009. Money was tight while competing in the series, and he supplemented his racing income by working at both a supermarket and a karting facility in New York.

In 2009, after three years of competition in the Skip Barber national series, McAleer took part in a scholarship competition for a Formula BMW ride, becoming one of ten finalists who earned a test with Räikkönen Robertson Racing. In 2010, a driver coaching position with F2000 Championship Series driver Tim Paul led to a part-time schedule in the series. Through six races, McAleer claimed two podium finishes.

=== Mazda MX-5 ===
While competing in regional junior formula championships, McAleer also competed in one-off sports car racing events. One of these events, the 25 Hours of Thunderhill, put him into contact with MLB pitcher C. J. Wilson, leading to a drive in the 2012 Global MX-5 Cup. McAleer scored a victory in the opening weekend at Sebring, adding two more victories and eight total podiums over the course of the season en route to the series championship. The championship prize gave him the opportunity to contest a full season in either the then-Continental Tire Sports Car Challenge or Pirelli World Challenge. Electing to pursue the former, McAleer teamed up with co-driver Marc Miller to take on the full season for C.J. Wilson Racing. Scoring class victories at COTA and Watkins Glen, the duo finished seventh in the Street Tuner class championship. McAleer also claimed the series' Rookie of the Year award. He returned to the team for the 2014 season, paired with new co-driver Chad McCumbee. They would claim three podiums but no race victories, finishing seventh in the Street Tuner class. For 2015, the driver lineup remained the same. At Watkins Glen in June, the duo claimed the team's first victory since 2013, before adding another victory at Lime Rock in July. Entering the final race of the season at Road Atlanta, McCumbee and McAleer sat just one point clear at the top of the class championship over Andrew Carbonell. Finishing eighth in class, the duo claimed the Street Tuner class championship.

Ahead of the 2016 season, the two drivers moved to Freedom Autosport. They scored their first victory for their new team at Laguna Seca, adding another at Lime Rock as they finished fourth in the class championship. The following season, McCumbee and McAleer claimed their third consecutive victory at Lime Rock, scoring another at Road America and finishing three consecutive seasons with two class victories.

In 2022, McAleer served as a member of the judging panel for Mazda Motorsports' Spec MX-5 shootout competition.

=== Sports car racing ===
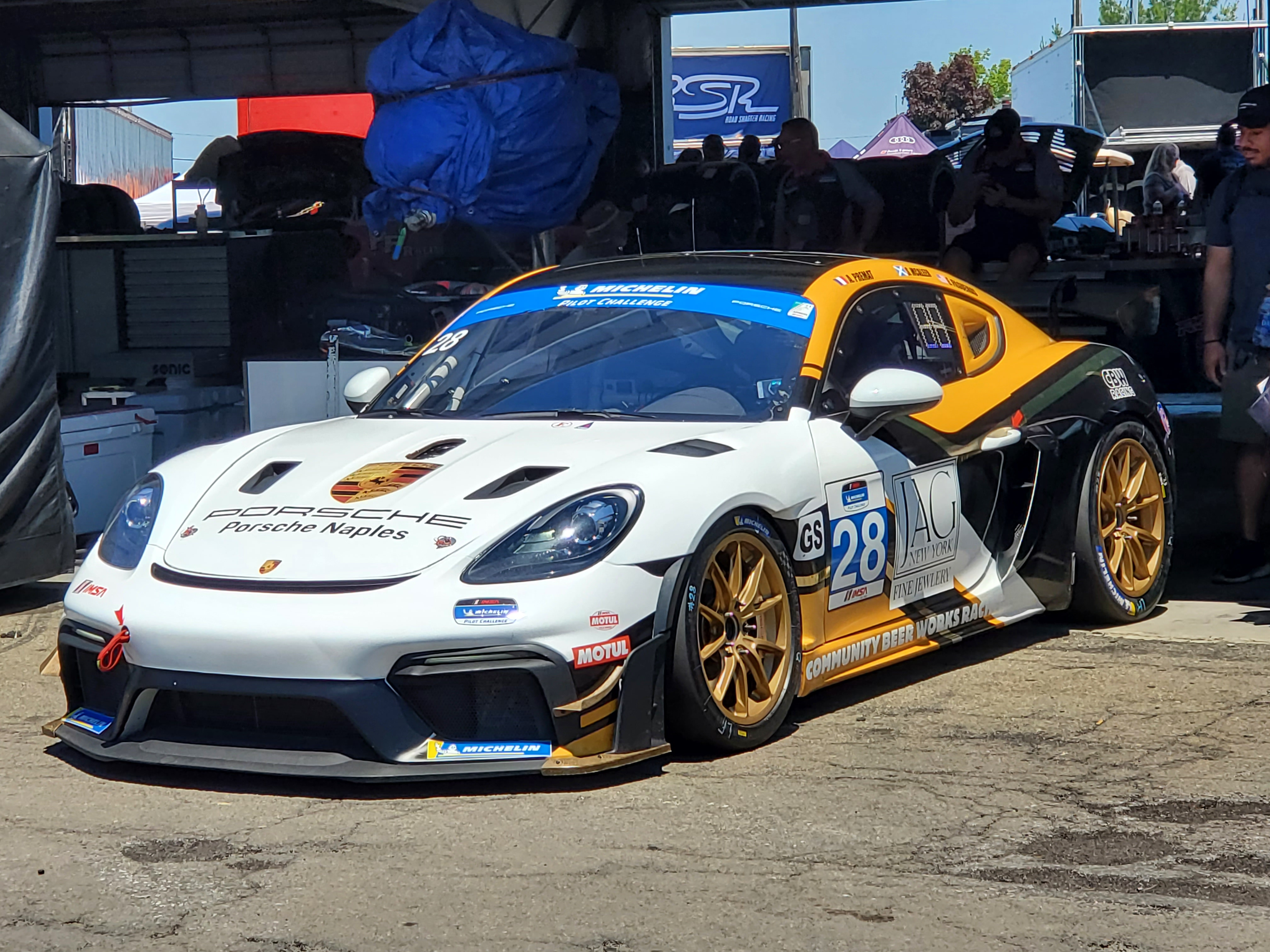
McAleer's RS1 Porsche at Watkins Glen in 2022.

In 2018, McAleer embarked on a three-pronged program in the Continental Tire SportsCar Challenge, Pirelli World Challenge, and Lamborghini Super Trofeo North America. Joining Bodymotion Racing in the former series, McAleer moved to the GS class, competing in a Porsche Cayman GT4 Clubsport MR alongside Joe Robillard. Registering a best finish of sixth at Daytona, the team would compete in just six of the ten total races, finishing 28th in the GS-class championship. McAleer's campaign in the Pirelli World Challenge was also shortened, as he competed in just ten of the 18 races for the Classic BMW team, placing on the podium once; a second-place finish at COTA. His Lamborghini Super Trofeo exploits yielded a second-place finish in the Pro-Am championship, with McAleer representing the professional co-driver to amateur driver Randy Sellari.

For 2019, McAleer began competing in the IMSA Prototype Challenge, competing with the Mühlner Motorsport-backed Robillard Racing team. After lining up for the opening race alongside Kenton Koch, McAleer ran four of the final five races in a solo entry, driving alongside Robillard in the fourth event at Canadian Tire Motorsport Park. In his first race as a solo driver, at Sebring, McAleer claimed his first victory in the series. Later that season, at Mosport, he would claim his first pole in an IMSA-sanctioned series, going on to finish tenth during the race. After adding another race victory at VIR in August, McAleer came home second in the championship, 26 points behind Austin McCusker and Rodrigo Pflucker. McAleer also competed full-time in the GT4 America Series in 2019, driving for Classic BMW alongside Justin Raphael. Claiming two victories – at VIR and Road America – and seven total class podiums, the duo scored the East Pro-Am Cup title on a points technicality. Patrick Byrne and Guy Cosmo were listed as invisible for points as they entered their first race during the final two rounds of the season, moving McAleer and Raphael two points clear of Karl Wittmer in second.

2020 saw McAleer compete full-time in two IMSA-sanctioned series, returning to the IMSA Prototype Challenge alongside a Pro-class drive in the Lamborghini Super Trofeo North America. Driving alongside Stuart Middleton for Wayne Taylor Racing, the duo finished fourth in the overall championship, claiming six class podium finishes. Partnered once again with Robillard in the LMP3 ranks, McAleer claimed podium finishes at Sebring and VIR, finishing tenth in the championship. For 2021, McAleer took on a variety of drives in various series. The 2021 GT4 America Series saw McAleer return to Classic BMW, this time paired with Toby Grahovec. Despite not starting the first round at Sonoma, the duo finished fourth in the Silver Cup championship, scoring seven class podiums including a class victory at VIR and an overall victory at Watkins Glen, the latter of which came the day after the car was disqualified from the first race. Continuing in GT4 competition, McAleer embarked on a part-time campaign in the Michelin Pilot Challenge with RS1, driving alongside Patrick Gallagher. In his first race of the season, which took place at Watkins Glen, McAleer and Gallagher scored the overall race victory, adding a podium finish at Lime Rock later in the season. McAleer also completed a third full season in the IMSA Prototype Challenge, finishing fifth in the championship alongside Joe Robillard. McAleer and co-driver Madison Snow also took second in the Pro class of the Lamborghini Super Trofeo North America, claiming their only victory of the season at COTA in May.

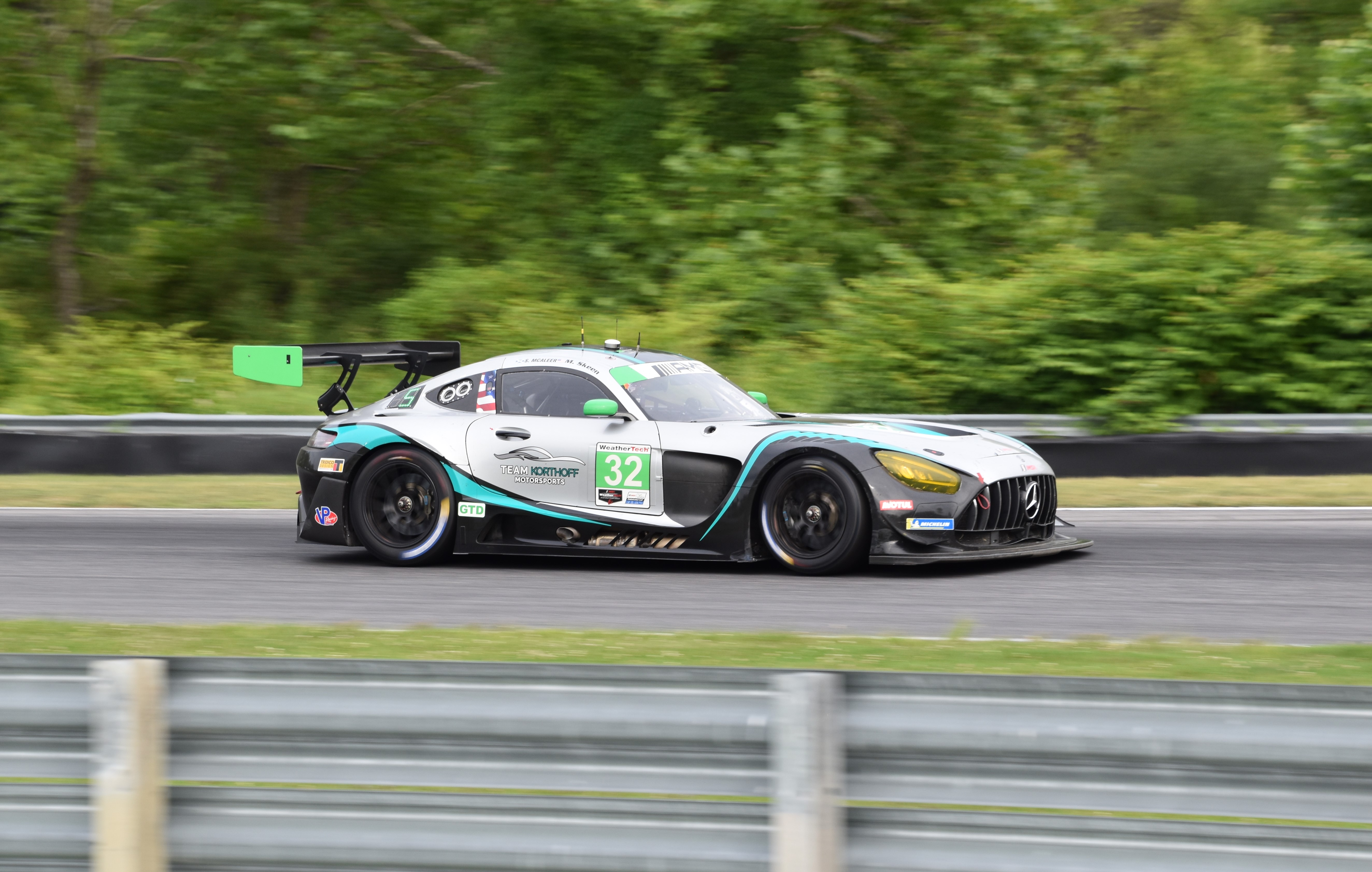
McAleer's Mercedes-AMG GT3 Evo at Lime Rock Park in 2022.

McAleer returned to RS1 in 2022, taking part in both the GT4 America Series and Michelin Pilot Challenge with the team. McAleer's stint in the IMSA-sanctioned series was short, but through six races he claimed three podium finishes alongside various co-drivers, including Eric Filgueiras, Alexandre Prémat, and John Capestro-Dubets. After rallying to a late victory at the season-opening event at Daytona, McAleer added podium finishes at Laguna Seca and Watkins Glen, finishing 18th in the GS class championship despite missing four of the ten races. McAleer competed full-time for RS1 in the Silver Cup class of the GT4 America Series, driving alongside Eric Filgueiras. Out of the 14 races, the team would claim 11 class victories, finishing off of the podium just twice. Of the seven championship weekends, the duo swept four of them – at Sonoma, NOLA, Watkins Glen, and Indianapolis – clinching the title with one race to go.

McAleer competed full-time in the IMSA SportsCar Championship in 2022, driving for Team Korthoff Motorsports in the GTD class paired with Mike Skeen for the full season. Despite never claiming a race victory, the team remained in the title fight for the majority of the season, with McAleer eventually finishing third in the GTD standings with two podiums to his name. After being promoted to an FIA Gold Categorisation for 2023, McAleer departed the team.

Following their championship triumph in 2022, McAleer and Filgueiras took on a full-season program in GT World Challenge America with RS1, taking part in the Pro class. After claiming overall victory in the opening race of the season at Sonoma, the duo would add an overall victory at NOLA and a class victory at COTA, tallying nine total podiums over the course of the 13-race season. They claimed the Pro class championship at season's end, 44 points clear of second-place Mario Farnbacher and Ashton Harrison. McAleer also continued full-time in the Michelin Pilot Challenge alongside Filgueiras, scoring three podium finishes en route to a fourth-place championship finish.

In 2025, McAleer joined Auto Technic Racing in the IMSA Michelin Pilot Challenge, sharing the No. 27 BMW M4 GT4 EVO with Austin Krainz in the Grand Sport (GS) class. The pairing finished third in the drivers' championship with 2,470 points. Their season included seven top-six finishes and two podium results, consisting of one second-place and one third-place finish.

In 2026 McAleer continued with Auto Technic Racing and co-driver Austin Krainz for the 2026 IMSA Michelin Pilot Challenge season, again competing in the No. 27 BMW M4 GT4 EVO. The duo secured the GS drivers' championship at the season finale at Michelin Raceway Road Atlanta, finishing third in the race. Despite recording no race victories, McAleer and Krainz achieved two podium finishes and seven top-six results during the season. The title was McAleer's second in the series, following his 2015 Street Tuner championship, and marked Auto Technic Racing's first IMSA championship. McAleer also equaled the series record for the longest interval between championships, at 11 years.

=== Driver coaching ===
While competing full-time, McAleer also takes on driver coaching opportunities. While working at a karting facility in Mount Kisco, New York, he met Monticello Motor Club president Ari Straus, leading to McAleer working at the facility. According to McAleer, the coaching opportunities contribute to helping him become a better driver himself.

=== McCumbee McAleer Racing ===
In 2015, McAleer and then-teammate Chad McCumbee formed their own racing team, dubbed McCumbee McAleer Racing, to compete in the Mazda MX-5 Cup series. The team, based in Supply, North Carolina, entered three cars in their first season under title sponsorship from ModSpace. McCumbee McAleer Racing formed out of the ashes of C.J. Wilson's MX-5 Cup team – the same team that the two drivers were competing for in the Continental Tire Sports Car Challenge. In their opening season, they claimed two race victories and were named Team of the Year. Driver Patrick Gallagher, who competed for the team during 2017, scored the series championship for the team that season, claiming eight race victories and taking the title by over 100 points. The team was once again recognized as Team of the Year. In 2018, the team was awarded the Clean Image Award, owing to their professional appearance in the paddock.

In 2023, the team expanded to GT4 competition, fielding a Ford Mustang GT4 in the Michelin Pilot Challenge for McCumbee and former MX-5 Cup driver Jenson Altzman.

== Personal life ==
The oldest of five brothers, McAleer was raised in the town of Rutherglen on the south-eastern outskirts of Glasgow, and attended Stonelaw High School. Early in his career, he would listen to Fleetwood Mac before races. He also owns his own go-karting team, and enjoys running outside of racing.

== Racing record ==
=== Career summary ===
Season	Series	Team	Races	Wins	Poles	F/Laps	Podiums	Points	Position
2007	Skip Barber National		14	1	0	0	5	352	4th
2008	Skip Barber National		14	0	0	0	3	351	5th
2009	Skip Barber National		8	0	1	0	1	?	?
2010	F2000 Championship Series	SMR Motorsports	6	0	0	0	2	153	12th
2012	SCCA Pro Racing Mazda MX-5 Cup	C.J. Wilson Racing	11	3	5	?	8	617	**1st**
2013	Continental Tire Sports Car Challenge - ST	C.J. Wilson Racing	11	2	0	0	2	209	7th
2014	Continental Tire Sports Car Challenge - ST	C.J. Wilson Racing	12	0	0	2	3	237	7th
2015	Continental Tire Sports Car Challenge - ST	C.J. Wilson Racing	10	2	0	0	4	264	**1st**
2016	Continental Tire Sports Car Challenge - ST	Freedom Autosport	10	2	0	0	2	252	4th
2017	Continental Tire Sports Car Challenge - ST	Freedom Autosport	10	2	0	0	3	241	5th
2017	Lamborghini Super Trofeo North America - Pro	Prestige Performance/WTR	4	0	0	0	1	28	8th
2018	Lamborghini Super Trofeo North America - Pro-Am	Prestige Performance/WTR	8	1	2	0	5	65	**2nd**
2018	Pirelli World Challenge SprintX - GTS Pro-Am	Classic BMW	10	0	0	0	1	51	20th
2018	Continental Tire Sports Car Challenge - GS	Bodymotion Racing	6	0	0	0	0	98	28th
2019	GT4 America Series East - Pro-Am	Classic BMW	10	1	0	3	5	167	**1st**
2019	IMSA Prototype Challenge	Robillard Racing	6	2	3	0	2	149	**2nd**
2020	Lamborghini Super Trofeo North America - Pro	Prestige Performance/WTR	10	0	0	0	6	78	4th
2020	IMSA Prototype Challenge	Robillard Racing LLC	5	0	0	0	2	134	10th
2020	Michelin Pilot Challenge - GS	Fast Track Racing/Classic BMW	1	0	0	0	0	9	68th
2021	Lamborghini Super Trofeo North America - Pro	Change Racing	9	1	1	0	7	84	**2nd**
2021	GT4 America Series - Silver	Classic BMW	12	2	3	5	7	159	4th
2021	IMSA Prototype Challenge - LMP3-1	Robillard Racing	6	0	0	0	0	1160	5th
2021	IMSA SportsCar Championship - LMP3	Mühlner Motorsports America	1	0	1	1	1	312	20th
2021	IMSA SportsCar Championship - LMP3	Forty7 Motorsports	1	0	0	0	0	312	20th
2021	IMSA SportsCar Championship - GTD	Gilbert Korthoff Motorsports	1	0	0	0	0	188	69th
2021	Michelin Pilot Challenge - GS	Notlad Racing by RS1	5	1	1	1	2	1230	24th
2022	GT4 America Series - Silver	RS1	14	11	12	?	12	305	**1st**
2022	Michelin Pilot Challenge - GS	RS1	6	1	3	1	3	1520	18th
2022	IMSA SportsCar Championship - GTD	Team Korthoff Motorsports	11	0	1	0	2	2860	**3rd**
2022	IMSA Prototype Challenge	JDC MotorSports	1	0	0	0	0	150	41st
2023	GT World Challenge America - Pro	RennSport1 - CBW Racing	13	3	4	3	9	236	**1st**
2023	Michelin Pilot Challenge - GS	RS1	10	0	1	0	3	2180	4th
2023	IMSA SportsCar Championship - LMP3	MLT Motorsports	1	0	0	0	0	230	37th
2024	Michelin Pilot Challenge - GS	RennSport1	10	2	3	2	4	2590	**2nd**
2024	IMSA SportsCar Championship - GTD	Gradient Racing	9	0	0	0	1	2016	16th
2025	IMSA SportsCar Championship - GTD	Triarsi Competizione	4	0	0	0	0	697	38th
2025	Michelin Pilot Challenge - GS	Auto Technic Racing	10	0	0	0	2	2470	**3rd**
2026	Michelin Pilot Challenge - GS	Auto Technic Racing	10	0	0	0	2	2490	**1st**

^{*} Season still in progress.

=== Complete IMSA SportsCar Championship results ===
(key) (Races in bold indicate pole position)

Year	Team	Class	Make	Engine	1	2	3	4	5	6	7	8	9	10	11	12	Rank	Points
2021	Mühlner Motorsports America	LMP3	Duqueine D-08	Nissan VK56DE 5.6 L V8	**DAY**; 3												20th	312
2021	Forty7 Motorsports	LMP3	Duqueine D-08	Nissan VK56DE 5.6 L V8		SEB; 4											20th	312
2021	Gilbert Korthoff Motorsports	GTD	Mercedes-AMG GT3 Evo	Mercedes-AMG M159 6.2 L V8			MDO	BEL	WGL1	WGL2	LIM	ELK	LGA	LBH	VIR	PET; 14	69th	188
2022	Team Korthoff Motorsports	GTD	Mercedes-AMG GT3 Evo	Mercedes-AMG M159 6.2 L V8	DAY; 3	SEB; 2	LBH; 6	LGA; 5	MDO; 6	DET; 5	**WGL**; 10	MOS	LIM; 4	ELK; 8	VIR; 8	PET; 6	3rd	2860
2023	MLT Motorsports	LMP3	Ligier JS P320	Nissan VK56DE 5.6L V8	DAY	SEB	WGL; 8	MOS	ELK	IMS	PET						37th	230
2024	Gradient Racing	GTD	Acura NSX GT3 Evo22	Acura 3.5 L Turbo V6	DAY; 19	SEB	LBH; 4	LGA; 12	WGL; 13	MOS; 7	ELK; 3	VIR; 12	IMS; 16	PET; 12			16th	2016
2025	Triarsi Competizione	GTD	Ferrari 296 GT3	Ferrari F163CE 3.0 L Turbo V6	DAY; 22	SEB; 15	LBH; 14	LGA; 11	WGL	MOS	ELK	VIR	IMS	PET			38th	697

Sporting positions
Preceded by Michael Cooper	Global Mazda MX-5 Cup; Champion; 2012	Succeeded by Christian Szymczak
Preceded by Eric Foss	Continental Tire Sports Car Challenge; ST Champion; 2015; With: Chad McCumbee	Succeeded by Nick Galante; Spencer Pumpelly
Preceded by Series Founded	GT4 America Series; East Pro-Am Champion; 2019; With: Justin Raphael	Succeeded by Class Folded
Preceded by Kenny Murillo; Christian Szymczak	GT4 America Series; Silver Champion; 2022; With: Eric Filgueiras	Succeeded by Zac Anderson
Preceded by Andrea Caldarelli	GT World Challenge America; Pro Champion; 2023; With: Eric Filgueiras	Succeeded by Incumbent
