= 2024 Michelin GT Challenge at VIR =

Ninth round of the 2024 IMSA SportsCar Championship season

The layout of Virginia International Raceway, where the race was held.

The 2024 Michelin GT Challenge at VIR was a sports car race held at Virginia International Raceway in Alton, Virginia, on August 25, 2024. It was the ninth round of the 2024 IMSA SportsCar Championship.

== Background ==
=== Preview ===
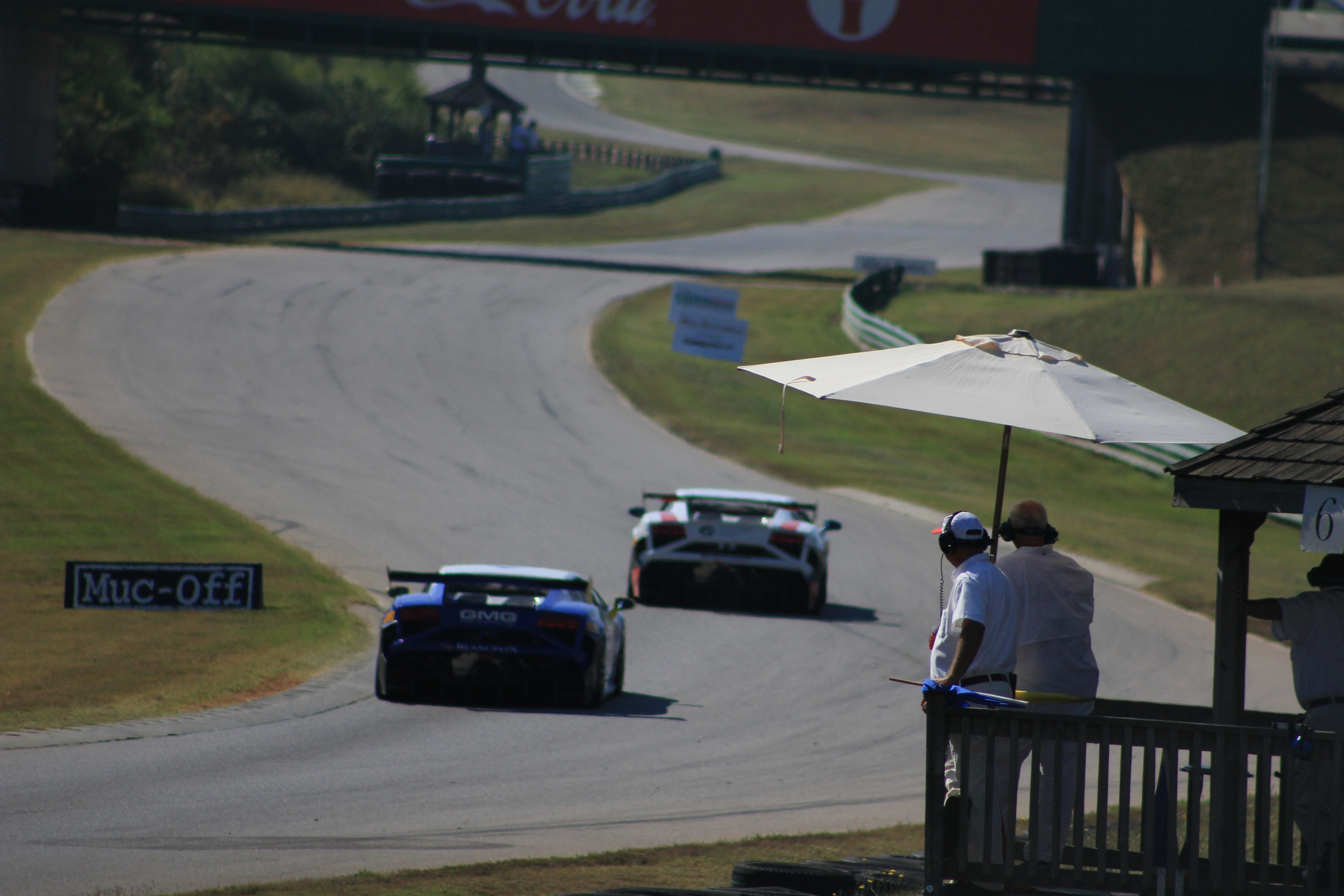
Virginia International Raceway, where the race was held.

International Motor Sports Association (IMSA) president John Doonan confirmed the race was part of the 2024 IMSA SportsCar Championship (IMSA SCC) in August 2023. It was the eleventh consecutive year the IMSA SCC hosted a race at Virginia International Raceway. The 2024 Michelin GT Challenge at VIR was the ninth of eleven scheduled sports car races of 2024 by IMSA. The race was held at the seventeen-turn 3.270 mi (5.263 km) Virginia International Raceway on August 25, 2024.

=== Balance of performance ===
Ahead of the event, IMSA published a bulletin regarding the latest balance of performance (BoP) changes in the GTD Pro and GTD classes. The Acura was given a 1-liter increase in fuel capacity to accommodate the 11.5 horsepower gained across all power levels. Additionally, the Lamborghini saw an increase in weight of 15 kilograms. This was countered by an increase of 5.3 horsepower across all power levels, and a 2-liter fuel capacity increase. Finally, the Ferrari saw an increase of 10 kilograms in weight, with no adjustments to the power level.

=== Standings before the race ===
Preceding the event, Laurin Heinrich led the GTD Pro Drivers' Championship with 2256 points, 76 points ahead of second-placed Ross Gunn. Ben Barnicoat and Jack Hawksworth sat in third place, a further 97 points behind. The GTD Drivers' Championship was led by Philip Ellis and Russell Ward with 2396 points. They had lead of 268 points over second-placed Robby Foley and Patrick Gallagher. Parker Thompson sat in third, 526 points behind Ellis and Ward. The Manufacturers' Championships were led by Porsche and Mercedes-AMG, respectively, whilst AO Racing and Winward Racing led the Teams' Championships.

== Entry list ==
The entry list was revealed on August 14, 2024, and featured 23 entries: 9 entries in GTD Pro, and 14 entries in GTD. Klaus Bachler replaced Julien Andlauer in the No. 77 AO Racing Porsche, to race alongside Laurin Heinrich. Furthermore, Kyle Marcelli re-joined Danny Formal in the No. 45 Wayne Taylor Racing with Andretti Lamborghini, after missing the previous round due to an arm-related injury. Both the No. 023 Triarsi Competizione and No. 35 Conquest Racing Ferraris did not appear at the start after one-off appearances at Road America.

No.	Entrant	Car	Driver 1	Driver 2
GTD Pro (GT Daytona Pro) (9 entries)
1	(United States) Paul Miller Racing	BMW M4 GT3	(United States) Bryan Sellers	(United States) Madison Snow
3	(United States) Corvette Racing by Pratt Miller Motorsports	Chevrolet Corvette Z06 GT3.R	(Spain) Antonio García	(United Kingdom) Alexander Sims
4	(United States) Corvette Racing by Pratt Miller Motorsports	Chevrolet Corvette Z06 GT3.R	(Netherlands) Nicky Catsburg	(United States) Tommy Milner
9	(Canada) Pfaff Motorsports	McLaren 720S GT3 Evo	(United Kingdom) Oliver Jarvis	(Germany) Marvin Kirchhöfer
14	(United States) Vasser Sullivan	Lexus RC F GT3	(United Kingdom) Ben Barnicoat	(United Kingdom) Jack Hawksworth
23	(United States) Heart of Racing Team	Aston Martin Vantage AMR GT3 Evo	(United Kingdom) Ross Gunn	(Spain) Alex Riberas
64	(Canada) Ford Multimatic Motorsports	Ford Mustang GT3	(Germany) Mike Rockenfeller	(United Kingdom) Harry Tincknell
65	(Canada) Ford Multimatic Motorsports	Ford Mustang GT3	(United States) Joey Hand	(Germany) Dirk Müller
77	(United States) AO Racing	Porsche 911 GT3 R (992)	(Austria) Klaus Bachler	(Germany) Laurin Heinrich
GTD (GT Daytona) (14 entries)
12	(United States) Vasser Sullivan	Lexus RC F GT3	(United States) Frankie Montecalvo	(Canada) Parker Thompson
13	(Canada) AWA	Chevrolet Corvette Z06 GT3.R	(United Kingdom) Matt Bell	(Canada) Orey Fidani
27	(United States) Heart of Racing Team	Aston Martin Vantage AMR GT3 Evo	(Canada) Roman De Angelis	(Canada) Zacharie Robichon
32	(United States) Korthoff/Preston Motorsports	Mercedes-AMG GT3 Evo	(Canada) Mikaël Grenier	(United States) Kenton Koch
34	(United States) Conquest Racing	Ferrari 296 GT3	(Spain) Albert Costa	(United States) Manny Franco
45	(United States) Wayne Taylor Racing with Andretti	Lamborghini Huracán GT3 Evo 2	(Costa Rica) Danny Formal	(Canada) Kyle Marcelli
55	(Germany) Proton Competition	Ford Mustang GT3	(Italy) Giammarco Levorato	(United States) Corey Lewis
57	(United States) Winward Racing	Mercedes-AMG GT3 Evo	(Switzerland) Philip Ellis	(United States) Russell Ward
66	(United States) Gradient Racing	Acura NSX GT3 Evo22	(United Kingdom) Stevan McAleer	(United States) Sheena Monk
70	(United Kingdom) Inception Racing	McLaren 720S GT3 Evo	(United States) Brendan Iribe	(Denmark) Frederik Schandorff
78	(United States) Forte Racing	Lamborghini Huracán GT3 Evo 2	(Canada) Misha Goikhberg	(Italy) Loris Spinelli
86	(United States) MDK Motorsports	Porsche 911 GT3 R (992)	(Denmark) Anders Fjordbach	(China) Kerong Li
96	(United States) Turner Motorsport	BMW M4 GT3	(United States) Robby Foley	(United States) Patrick Gallagher
120	(United States) Wright Motorsports	Porsche 911 GT3 R (992)	(United States) Adam Adelson	(United States) Elliott Skeer

== Practice ==
There were two practice sessions preceding the start of the race on Sunday, one on Friday afternoon and one on Saturday morning. The first session on Friday afternoon lasted 90 minutes while the second session on Saturday morning lasted 105 minutes.

== Qualifying ==
Saturday's afternoon qualifying session lasted 15 minutes, with one combined session for the GTD Pro and GTD cars. The rules dictated that all teams nominated a driver to qualify their cars. The competitors' fastest lap times determined the starting order.

=== Qualifying results ===
Pole positions in each class are indicated in bold and with ‡.

Pos.	Class	No.	Entry	Driver	Time	Gap	Grid
1	**GTD Pro**	**1**	**(United States) Paul Miller Racing**	**(United States) Madison Snow**	**1:43.206**	—	1‡
2	GTD Pro	3	(United States) Corvette Racing by Pratt Miller Motorsports	(Spain) Antonio García	1:43.346	+0.140	2
3	GTD Pro	64	(Canada) Ford Multimatic Motorsports	(United Kingdom) Harry Tincknell	1:43.630	+0.424	3
4	GTD Pro	65	(Canada) Ford Multimatic Motorsports	(United States) Joey Hand	1:43.729	+0.523	4
5	GTD Pro	4	(United States) Corvette Racing by Pratt Miller Motorsports	(United States) Tommy Milner	1:43.745	+0.539	5
6	**GTD**	**55**	**(Germany) Proton Competition**	**(Italy) Giammarco Levorato**	**1:43.900**	**+0.694**	6‡
7	GTD	32	(United States) Korthoff/Preston Motorsports	(United States) Kenton Koch	1:44.106	+0.900	7
8	GTD	120	(United States) Wright Motorsports	(United States) Elliott Skeer	1:44.118	+0.912	8
9	GTD Pro	14	(United States) Vasser Sullivan	(United Kingdom) Jack Hawksworth	1:44.177	+0.971	9
10	GTD Pro	9	(Canada) Pfaff Motorsports	(United Kingdom) Oliver Jarvis	1:44.297	+1.091	10
11	GTD	27	(United States) Heart of Racing Team	(Canada) Zacharie Robichon	1:44.362	+1.156	11
12	GTD	96	(United States) Turner Motorsport	(United States) Patrick Gallagher	1:44.392	+1.186	12
13	GTD Pro	77	(United States) AO Racing	(Austria) Klaus Bachler	1:44.417	+1.211	13
14	GTD Pro	23	(United States) Heart of Racing Team	(Spain) Alex Riberas	1:44.499	+1.293	14
15	GTD	45	(United States) Wayne Taylor Racing with Andretti	(Canada) Kyle Marcelli	1:44.504	+1.298	15
16	GTD	12	(United States) Vasser Sullivan	(United States) Frankie Montecalvo	1:44.541	+1.335	16
17	GTD	78	(United States) Forte Racing	(Canada) Misha Goikhberg	1:44.793	+1.587	17
18	GTD	57	(United States) Winward Racing	(United States) Russell Ward	1:44.855	+1.649	18
19	GTD	70	(United Kingdom) Inception Racing	(United States) Brendan Iribe	1:45.020	+1.814	19
20	GTD	66	(United States) Gradient Racing	(United States) Sheena Monk	1:45.069	+1.863	20
21	GTD	34	(United States) Conquest Racing	(United States) Manny Franco	1:45.348	+2.142	21
22	GTD	86	(United States) MDK Motorsports	(China) Kerong Li	1:46.754	+3.548	22
23	GTD	13	(Canada) AWA	(Canada) Orey Fidani	1:47.306	+4.100	23

== Race ==
=== Post-race ===
The final results of GTD Pro meant Heinrich continued to lead the GTD Pro Drivers' Championship, but his advantage was reduced to 17 points by third-place finisher Gunn. Sellers and Snow jumped from fifth to third. Ellis and Ward's third-place finish allowed them to extend their advantage over Foley and Gallagher in the GTD Drivers' Championship. Porsche and Mercedes-AMG continued to top their respective Manufacturers' Championships while AO Racing, and Winward Racing kept their respective advantages in their of Teams' Championships with two rounds remaining.

=== Race results ===
Class winners are in bold and ‡.

Pos	Class	No	Team	Drivers	Chassis	Laps	Time/Retired
Pos	Class	No	Team	Drivers	Engine	Laps	Time/Retired
1	**GTD Pro**	**1**	**(United States) Paul Miller Racing**	**(United States) Bryan Sellers (United States) Madison Snow**	**BMW M4 GT3**	**86**	**2:40:49.112‡**
1	**GTD Pro**	**1**	**(United States) Paul Miller Racing**	**(United States) Bryan Sellers (United States) Madison Snow**	**BMW P58 3.0 L Turbo I6**	**86**	**2:40:49.112‡**
2	GTD Pro	64	(Canada) Ford Multimatic Motorsports	(Germany) Mike Rockenfeller (United Kingdom) Harry Tincknell	Ford Mustang GT3	86	+3.368
2	GTD Pro	64	(Canada) Ford Multimatic Motorsports	(Germany) Mike Rockenfeller (United Kingdom) Harry Tincknell	Ford Coyote 5.4 L V8	86	+3.368
3	GTD Pro	23	(United States) Heart of Racing Team	(United Kingdom) Ross Gunn (Spain) Alex Riberas	Aston Martin Vantage AMR GT3 Evo	86	+4.199
3	GTD Pro	23	(United States) Heart of Racing Team	(United Kingdom) Ross Gunn (Spain) Alex Riberas	Aston Martin M177 4.0 L Turbo V8	86	+4.199
4	GTD Pro	65	(Canada) Ford Multimatic Motorsports	(United States) Joey Hand (Germany) Dirk Müller	Ford Mustang GT3	86	+11.688
4	GTD Pro	65	(Canada) Ford Multimatic Motorsports	(United States) Joey Hand (Germany) Dirk Müller	Ford Coyote 5.4 L V8	86	+11.688
5	**GTD**	**32**	**(United States) Korthoff/Preston Motorsports**	**(Canada) Mikaël Grenier (United States) Kenton Koch**	**Mercedes-AMG GT3 Evo**	**86**	**+16.103‡**
5	**GTD**	**32**	**(United States) Korthoff/Preston Motorsports**	**(Canada) Mikaël Grenier (United States) Kenton Koch**	**Mercedes-AMG M159 6.2 L V8**	**86**	**+16.103‡**
6	GTD Pro	9	(Canada) Pfaff Motorsports	(United Kingdom) Oliver Jarvis (Germany) Marvin Kirchhöfer	McLaren 720S GT3 Evo	86	+16.404
6	GTD Pro	9	(Canada) Pfaff Motorsports	(United Kingdom) Oliver Jarvis (Germany) Marvin Kirchhöfer	McLaren M840T 4.0 L Turbo V8	86	+16.404
7	GTD Pro	14	(United States) Vasser Sullivan	(United Kingdom) Ben Barnicoat (United Kingdom) Jack Hawksworth	Lexus RC F GT3	86	+18.620
7	GTD Pro	14	(United States) Vasser Sullivan	(United Kingdom) Ben Barnicoat (United Kingdom) Jack Hawksworth	Toyota 2UR-GSE 5.0 L V8	86	+18.620
8	GTD	78	(United States) Forte Racing	(Canada) Misha Goikhberg (Italy) Loris Spinelli	Lamborghini Huracán GT3 Evo 2	86	+19.086
8	GTD	78	(United States) Forte Racing	(Canada) Misha Goikhberg (Italy) Loris Spinelli	Lamborghini DGF 5.2 L V10	86	+19.086
9	GTD Pro	77	(United States) AO Racing	(Austria) Klaus Bachler (Germany) Laurin Heinrich	Porsche 911 GT3 R (992)	86	+19.754
9	GTD Pro	77	(United States) AO Racing	(Austria) Klaus Bachler (Germany) Laurin Heinrich	Porsche M97/80 4.2 L Flat-6	86	+19.754
10	GTD	57	(United States) Winward Racing	(Switzerland) Philip Ellis (United States) Russell Ward	Mercedes-AMG GT3 Evo	86	+20.017
10	GTD	57	(United States) Winward Racing	(Switzerland) Philip Ellis (United States) Russell Ward	Mercedes-AMG M159 6.2 L V8	86	+20.017
11	GTD	96	(United States) Turner Motorsport	(United States) Robby Foley (United States) Patrick Gallagher	BMW M4 GT3	86	+20.311
11	GTD	96	(United States) Turner Motorsport	(United States) Robby Foley (United States) Patrick Gallagher	BMW P58 3.0 L Turbo I6	86	+20.311
12	GTD Pro	4	(United States) Corvette Racing by Pratt Miller Motorsports	(Netherlands) Nicky Catsburg (United States) Tommy Milner	Chevrolet Corvette Z06 GT3.R	86	+22.410
12	GTD Pro	4	(United States) Corvette Racing by Pratt Miller Motorsports	(Netherlands) Nicky Catsburg (United States) Tommy Milner	Chevrolet LT6 5.5 L V8	86	+22.410
13	GTD	34	(United States) Conquest Racing	(Spain) Albert Costa (United States) Manny Franco	Ferrari 296 GT3	86	+24.110
13	GTD	34	(United States) Conquest Racing	(Spain) Albert Costa (United States) Manny Franco	Ferrari F163 3.0 L Turbo V6	86	+24.110
14	GTD	13	(Canada) AWA	(United Kingdom) Matt Bell (Canada) Orey Fidani	Chevrolet Corvette Z06 GT3.R	86	+24.433
14	GTD	13	(Canada) AWA	(United Kingdom) Matt Bell (Canada) Orey Fidani	Chevrolet LT6 5.5 L V8	86	+24.433
15	GTD	55	(Germany) Proton Competition	(Italy) Giammarco Levorato (United States) Corey Lewis	Ford Mustang GT3	86	+27.346
15	GTD	55	(Germany) Proton Competition	(Italy) Giammarco Levorato (United States) Corey Lewis	Ford Coyote 5.4 L V8	86	+27.346
16	GTD	120	(United States) Wright Motorsports	(United States) Adam Adelson (United States) Elliott Skeer	Porsche 911 GT3 R (992)	86	+28.220
16	GTD	120	(United States) Wright Motorsports	(United States) Adam Adelson (United States) Elliott Skeer	Porsche M97/80 4.2 L Flat-6	86	+28.220
17	GTD	12	(United States) Vasser Sullivan	(United States) Frankie Montecalvo (Canada) Parker Thompson	Lexus RC F GT3	86	+57.555
17	GTD	12	(United States) Vasser Sullivan	(United States) Frankie Montecalvo (Canada) Parker Thompson	Toyota 2UR-GSE 5.0 L V8	86	+57.555
18	GTD	86	(United States) MDK Motorsports	(Denmark) Anders Fjordbach (China) Kerong Li	Porsche 911 GT3 R (992)	85	+1 Lap
18	GTD	86	(United States) MDK Motorsports	(Denmark) Anders Fjordbach (China) Kerong Li	Porsche M97/80 4.2 L Flat-6	85	+1 Lap
19	GTD	45	(United States) Wayne Taylor Racing with Andretti	(Costa Rica) Danny Formal (Canada) Kyle Marcelli	Lamborghini Huracán GT3 Evo 2	85	+1 Lap
19	GTD	45	(United States) Wayne Taylor Racing with Andretti	(Costa Rica) Danny Formal (Canada) Kyle Marcelli	Lamborghini DGF 5.2 L V10	85	+1 Lap
20	GTD	66	(United States) Gradient Racing	(United Kingdom) Stevan McAleer (United States) Sheena Monk	Acura NSX GT3 Evo22	72	+14 Laps
20	GTD	66	(United States) Gradient Racing	(United Kingdom) Stevan McAleer (United States) Sheena Monk	Acura JNC1 3.5 L Turbo V6	72	+14 Laps
21 DNF	GTD	70	(United Kingdom) Inception Racing	(United States) Brendan Iribe (Denmark) Frederik Schandorff	McLaren 720S GT3 Evo	68	Engine
21 DNF	GTD	70	(United Kingdom) Inception Racing	(United States) Brendan Iribe (Denmark) Frederik Schandorff	McLaren M840T 4.0 L Turbo V8	68	Engine
22	GTD	27	(United States) Heart of Racing Team	(Canada) Roman De Angelis (Canada) Zacharie Robichon	Aston Martin Vantage AMR GT3 Evo	86	+17.000 (Note: The No. 27 Heart of Racing Team Aston Martin was moved to the back of the GTD class since non-homologated parts were used during the event. It originally finished 7th overall, and 2nd in class.)
22	GTD	27	(United States) Heart of Racing Team	(Canada) Roman De Angelis (Canada) Zacharie Robichon	Aston Martin M177 4.0 L Turbo V8	86	+17.000
23	GTD Pro	3	(United States) Corvette Racing by Pratt Miller Motorsports	(Spain) Antonio García (United Kingdom) Alexander Sims	Chevrolet Corvette Z06 GT3.R	57	+29 Laps
23	GTD Pro	3	(United States) Corvette Racing by Pratt Miller Motorsports	(Spain) Antonio García (United Kingdom) Alexander Sims	Chevrolet LT6 5.5 L V8	57	+29 Laps

== Standings after the race ==
GTP Drivers' Championship standings
Pos.	+/–	Driver	Points
1		(United States) Dane Cameron (Brazil) Felipe Nasr	2386
2		(France) Mathieu Jaminet (United Kingdom) Nick Tandy	2286
3		(France) Sébastien Bourdais (Netherlands) Renger van der Zande	2201
4		(United Kingdom) Jack Aitken (Brazil) Pipo Derani	2144
5		(Switzerland) Louis Delétraz (United States) Jordan Taylor	2107

LMP2 Drivers' Championship standings
Pos.	+/–	Driver	Points
1		(United States) Nick Boulle (France) Tom Dillmann	1564
2		(Brazil) Felipe Fraga (United States) Gar Robinson	1537
3		(United Kingdom) Ryan Dalziel	1473
4		(United Kingdom) Ben Hanley (United States) Ben Keating	1467
5		(United States) Dan Goldburg	1372

GTD Pro Drivers' Championship standings
Pos.	+/–	Driver	Points
1		(Germany) Laurin Heinrich	2519
2		(United Kingdom) Ross Gunn	2502
3	2	(United States) Bryan Sellers (United States) Madison Snow	2408
4	1	(United Kingdom) Ben Barnicoat (United Kingdom) Jack Hawksworth	2358
5	1	(Spain) Antonio García (United Kingdom) Alexander Sims	2318

GTD Drivers' Championship standings
Pos.	+/–	Driver	Points
1		(Switzerland) Philip Ellis (United States) Russell Ward	2718
2		(United States) Robby Foley (United States) Patrick Gallagher	2434
3	1	(Canada) Mikaël Grenier	2178
4	1	(Canada) Parker Thompson	2114
5		(Spain) Albert Costa (United States) Manny Franco	2060

- Note: Only the top five positions are included for all sets of standings.

GTP Teams' Championship standings
Pos.	+/–	Team	Points
1		#7 Porsche Penske Motorsport	2386
2		#6 Porsche Penske Motorsport	2286
3		#01 Cadillac Racing	2201
4		#31 Whelen Cadillac Racing	2144
5		#40 Wayne Taylor Racing with Andretti	2107

LMP2 Teams' Championship standings
Pos.	+/–	Team	Points
1		#52 Inter Europol by PR1/Mathiasen Motorsports	1564
2		#74 Riley	1537
3		#18 Era Motorsport	1473
4		#2 United Autosports USA	1467
5		#22 United Autosports USA	1372

GTD Pro Teams' Championship standings
Pos.	+/–	Team	Points
1		#77 AO Racing	2519
2		#23 Heart of Racing Team	2502
3	2	#1 Paul Miller Racing	2408
4	1	#14 Vasser Sullivan	2358
5	1	#3 Corvette Racing by Pratt Miller Motorsports	2318

GTD Teams' Championship standings
Pos.	+/–	Team	Points
1		#57 Winward Racing	2718
2		#96 Turner Motorsport	2434
3		#32 Korthoff/Preston Motorsports	2178
4		#34 Conquest Racing	2060
5		#12 Vasser Sullivan	1921

- Note: Only the top five positions are included for all sets of standings.

GTP Manufacturers' Championship standings
Pos.	+/–	Manufacturer	Points
1		(Germany) Porsche	2555
2		(United States) Cadillac	2466
3		(Japan) Acura	2416
4		(Germany) BMW	2188
5		(Italy) Lamborghini	572

GTD Pro Manufacturers' Championship standings
Pos.	+/–	Manufacturer	Points
1		(Germany) Porsche	2579
2		(United Kingdom) Aston Martin	2540
3	1	(Japan) Lexus	2427
4	1	(United States) Chevrolet	2426
5	1	(United States) Ford	2329

GTD Manufacturers' Championship standings
Pos.	+/–	Manufacturer	Points
1		(Germany) Mercedes-AMG	2832
2	4	(Italy) Lamborghini	2300
3	1	(Germany) BMW	2296
4	1	(Japan) Lexus	2276
5	3	(United Kingdom) Aston Martin	2255

- Note: Only the top five positions are included for all sets of standings.

IMSA SportsCar Championship
Previous race: IMSA SportsCar Weekend	2024 season	Next race: IMSA Battle on the Bricks
