= Wesley Slimp =

American racing driver (born 2002)

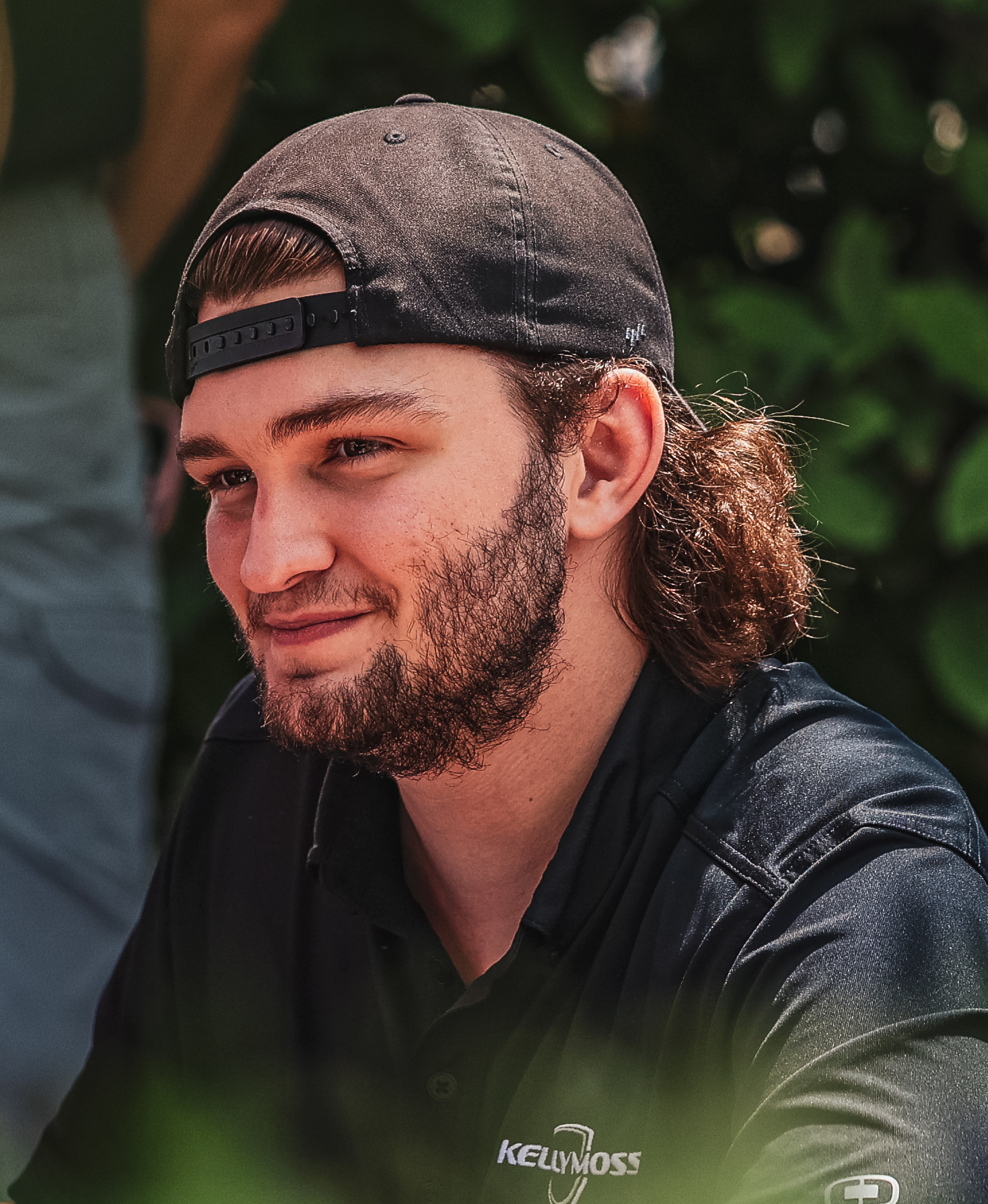
- Slimp at Road America in 2025
- Born: Wesley Henderson Slimp; May 7, 2002 (age 24); Marietta, Georgia, U.S.

NASCAR FedEx Freight Truck Series career
- 6 races run over 2 years
- 2026 position: 62nd
- Best finish: 42nd (2025)
- First race: 2025 LiUNA! 150 (Lime Rock)
- Last race: 2026 LiUNA! 150 (Lime Rock)
Wins	Top tens	Poles
0	0	0

ARCA Menards Series career
- 3 races run over 1 year
- ARCA no., team: No. 55 (Nitro Motorsports)
- Best finish: 53rd (2026)
- First race: 2026 General Tire 200 (Daytona)
- Last race: 2026 Henry Ford Health 200 (Michigan)
Wins	Top tens	Poles
0	2	0

ARCA Menards Series East career
- 2 races run over 1 year
- ARCA East no., team: No. 55 (Nitro Motorsports)
- Best finish: 31st (2026)
- First race: 2026 Rockingham ARCA Menards Series East 125 (Rockingham)
- Last race: 2026 Owens Corning 200 (Toledo)
Wins	Top tens	Poles
0	2	0

ARCA Menards Series West career
- 2 races run over 1 year
- ARCA West no., team: No. 55 (Nitro Motorsports)
- Best finish: 36th (2026)
- First race: 2026 Desert Diamond Casino West Valley 100 (Phoenix)
- Last race: 2026 NAPA Auto Parts 150 (Bakersfield)
Wins	Top tens	Poles
0	0	0
- Statistics up to date as of November 6, 2026.

Wesley Henderson Slimp (born May 7, 2002) is an American professional auto racing driver. He competes full-time in the ARCA Menards Series, driving the No. 55 Toyota for Nitro Motorsports.

Slimp has previously competed in series such as the NASCAR Craftsman Truck Series, the Lamborghini Super Trofeo North America, the Porsche Carrera Cup North America, the Trans Am Championship, and the Mustang Challenge Series.

== Racing career ==
Slimp's No. 9 car at Watkins Glen in 2023

Slimp's No. 7 car at Watkins Glen in 2025

Slimp began his racing career when he attended the Primal Racing School.

From 2019 to 2020, Slimp competed in the American Endurance Series, where he competed for Kingpin Racing.

In 2021, Slimp competed in the IMSA Michelin Pilot Challenge, where he competed at Road Atlanta for Goldcrest Motorsports.

In 2022, Slimp competed full-time in the Lamborghini Super Trofeo North America for TPC Racing with Tyler Huffman and Billy Johnson, where they won at season opening race at WeatherTech Raceway Laguna Seca. He and Huffman moved to Precision Performance Motorsports for the 2023 season, where they finished third in the Am class with two wins at Watkins Glen International and Vallelunga Circuit. He and Huffman once again ran full-time in the series for PPM in 2024, this time in the Pro-Am class. He also competed in the IMSA Ford Mustang Challenge for the same team.

In 2025, Slimp ran full-time in the Porsche Carrera Cup North America for Kellymoss, where he finished 23rd in the final standings. That same year, he was a part of the Porsche EBOOST Junior Driver Program.

=== ARCA ===
In 2026, it was revealed that Slimp would participate in the pre-season test for the ARCA Menards Series at Daytona International Speedway, driving the No. 90 Toyota for Nitro Motorsports. Later on, it was announced that he would run five ARCA races for the team.

On November 17, 2026, it was announced that Slimp will run full-time in ARCA for Nitro in the No. 55 for the 2027 season.

=== NASCAR ===
==== Craftsman Truck Series ====
Slimp's No. 62 truck at Lime Rock Park in 2026.

On June 23, 2025, it was announced that Slimp would compete in the NASCAR Craftsman Truck Series race at Lime Rock Park. He failed to finish the race due to ignition issues and was classified in 33rd place. In his next race at Watkins Glen International, he finished in 12th place.

In 2026, Slimp once again ran a partial schedule for HFR in the No. 62. He had a bet finish of 16th at Lime Rock Park.

== Personal life ==
Slimp is the son of Rob Slimp, the Chief Executive of HNTB, a civil engineering firm.

== Motorsports career results ==
=== Sports car career summary ===
Season	Series	Team	Races	Wins	Poles	F/Laps	Podiums	Points	Position
2021	Michelin Pilot Challenge - GS	Goldcrest Motorsports	1	0	0	0	0	210	51st
2022	Lamborghini Super Trofeo North America - Am	TC Racing	12	1	0	N/A	3	?	?
2023	Lamborghini Super Trofeo North America - Am	Precision Performance Motorsports	12	2	3	4	6	110	**3rd**
2023	Trans Am Championship - XGT	N/A	1	0	0	0	1	57	**3rd**
2024	Lamborghini Super Trofeo North America - Pro-Am	Precision Performance Motorsports	12	0	0	0	0	44	10th
2024	IMSA Ford Mustang Challenge	Precision Performance Motorsports	10	0	0	0	0	1300	16th
2025	Porsche Carrera Cup North America - Pro	Kellymoss	16	0	0	0	0	8	23rd

=== Stock car career summary ===
Season	Series	Team	Races	Wins	Top 5	Top 10	Points	Position
2025	NASCAR Craftsman Truck Series	Halmar Friesen Racing	3	0	0	0	39	42nd
2026	ASA STARS National Tour	Dan Fredrickson	1	0	0	0		
2026	ARCA Menards Series West	Nitro Motorsports	2	0	0	0	58	36th
2026	ARCA Menards Series East	Nitro Motorsports	2	0	1	2	75	31st
2026	ARCA Menards Series	Nitro Motorsports	3	0	0	2	80	53rd
2026	NASCAR Craftsman Truck Series	Halmar Friesen Racing	3	0	0	0	25	62nd

=== Complete Michelin Pilot Challenge results ===
(key) Races in bold indicates pole position. Races in italics indicates fastest lap.

Year	Team	Class	Make	Engine	1	2	3	4	5	6	7	8	9	10	Pos.	Points
2021	Goldcrest Motorsports	Grand Sport	Porsche 718 Cayman GT4 Clubsport	Porsche 3.8 L Flat-6	DAY	SEB	MOH	WGL1	WGL2	LIM	ELK	LGA	VIR	ATL; 10	51st	210

=== Complete Porsche Carrera Cup North America results ===
(key) (Races in bold indicate pole position) (Races in italics indicate fastest lap)

Year	Team	Class	1	2	3	4	5	6	7	8	9	10	11	12	13	14	15	16	Pos	Points
2025	Kellymoss	Pro	SEB; 1; 30	SEB; 2; 21	MIA; 1; 17	MIA; 2; 15	CGV; 1; 19	CGV; 2; 16	WGL; 1; 18	WGL; 2; 16	ROA; 1; 19	ROA; 2; 17	IMS; 1; 14	IMS; 2; 15	ATL; 1; 23	ATL; 2; 25	COT; 1; 14	COT; 2; 15	23rd	8

=== NASCAR ===
(key) (Bold – Pole position awarded by qualifying time. Italics – Pole position earned by points standings or practice time. * – Most laps led.)

==== Craftsman Truck Series ====
NASCAR Craftsman Truck Series results
Year	Team	No.	Make	1	2	3	4	5	6	7	8	9	10	11	12	13	14	15	16	17	18	19	20	21	22	23	24	25	NCTC	Pts	Ref
2025	Halmar Friesen Racing	62	Toyota	DAY	ATL	LVS	HOM	MAR	BRI	CAR	TEX	KAN	NWS	CLT	NSH	MCH	POC	LRP; 33	IRP	GLN; 12	RCH	DAR	BRI	NHA	ROV; 27	TAL	MAR	PHO	42nd	39	
2026	Halmar Friesen Racing	62	Toyota	DAY	ATL	STP; 36	DAR	ROC	BRI	TEX	GLN; 34	DOV	CLT	NSH	MCH	COR	LRP; 16	NWS	IRP	RCH	NHA	BRI	KAN	CLT	PHO	TAL	MAR	HOM	62nd	25	

=== ARCA Menards Series ===
(key) (Bold – Pole position awarded by qualifying time. Italics – Pole position earned by points standings or practice time. * – Most laps led.)

ARCA Menards Series results
Year	Team	No.	Make	1	2	3	4	5	6	7	8	9	10	11	12	13	14	15	16	17	18	19	20	AMSC	Pts	Ref
2026	Nitro Motorsports	90	Toyota	DAY; 35	PHO	KAN	TAL	GLN																53rd	80	
2026	Nitro Motorsports	25	Toyota						TOL; 8															53rd	80	
2026	Nitro Motorsports	15	Toyota							MCH; 9	POC	BER	ELK	CHI	LRP	IRP	IOW	ISF	MAD	DSF	SLM	BRI	KAN	53rd	80	

==== ARCA Menards Series East ====
ARCA Menards Series East results
Year	Team	No.	Make	1	2	3	4	5	6	7	8	AMSEC	Pts	Ref
2026	Nitro Motorsports	70	Toyota	HCY	CAR; 5	NSV						31st	75	
2026	Nitro Motorsports	25	Toyota				TOL; 8	IRP	FRS	IOW	BRI	31st	75	

==== ARCA Menards Series West ====
ARCA Menards Series West results
Year	Team	No.	Make	1	2	3	4	5	6	7	8	9	10	11	12	13	AMSWC	Pts	Ref
2026	Nitro Motorsports	90	Toyota	KER	PHO	TUC	SHA	CNS	TRI	SON	PIR	AAS	MAD	LVS	PHO; 18	KER; 12	36th	58	

=== ASA STARS National Tour ===
(key) (Bold – Pole position awarded by qualifying time. Italics – Pole position earned by points standings or practice time. * – Most laps led. ** – All laps led.)

ASA STARS National Tour results
Year	Team	No.	Make	1	2	3	4	5	6	7	8	9	10	11	ASNTC	Pts	Ref
2026	Dan Fredrickson	9	Toyota	NSM	FIF	HCY	SLG	MAD	NPS	OWO	TRI	WIN	NSV; 19	NSM	-*	-*	

^{*} Season still in progress
^{1} Ineligible for series points
