= Robert Noaker =

American racing driver (born 2004)

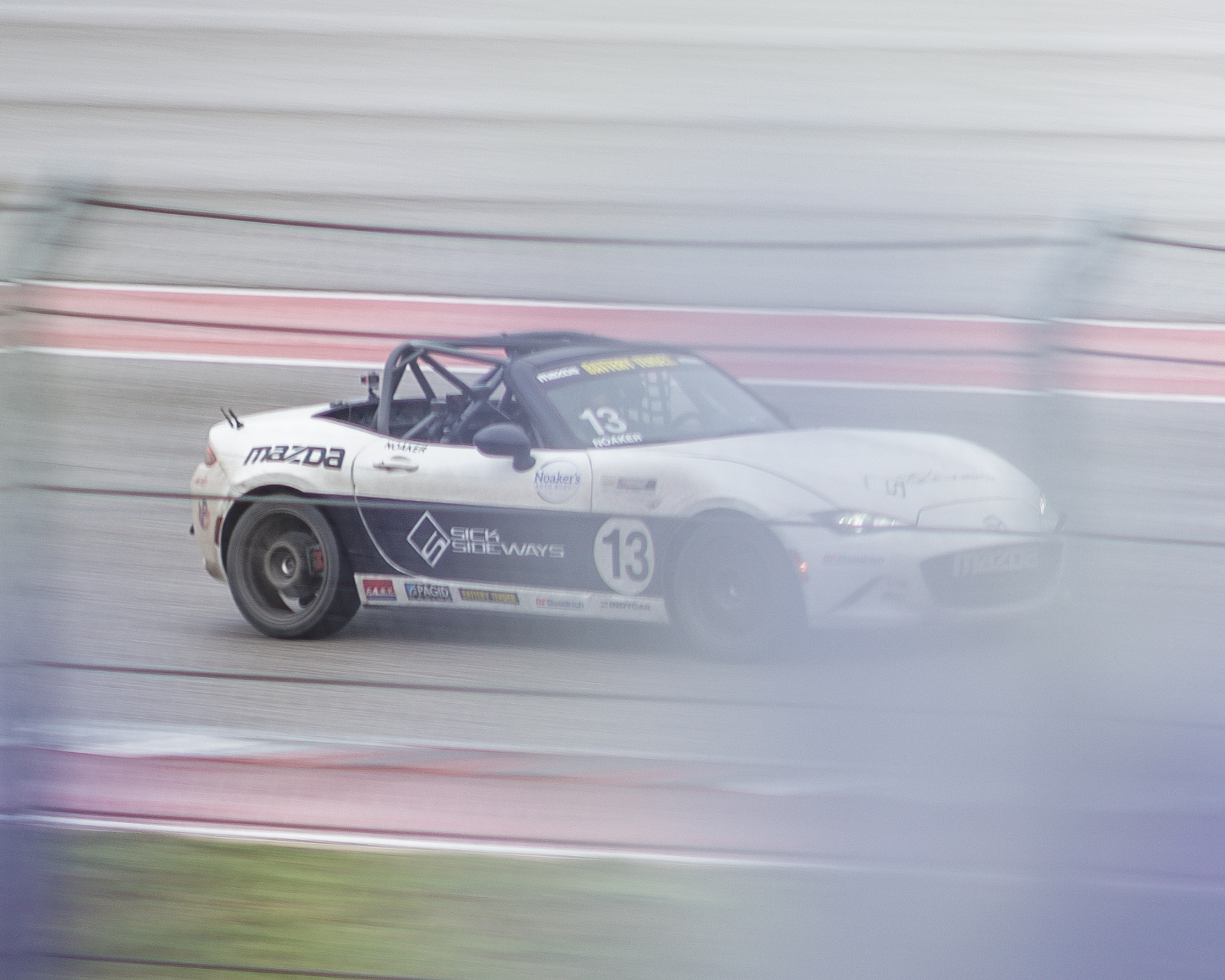
- Noaker in 2018
- Nationality: (United States) American
- Born: January 31, 2004 (age 22) Duncannon, Pennsylvania, U.S.

Michelin Pilot Challenge career
- Debut season: 2020
- Current team: McCumbee McAleer Racing
- Categorisation: FIA Silver
- Car number: 13
- Former teams: KohR Motorsports; Atlanta Speedwerks
- Starts: 20
- Wins: 0
- Podiums: 4
- Poles: 3
- Fastest laps: 0
- Best finish: 3rd in 2026 (GS)

Championship titles
- 2024, 2025: IMSA Ford Mustang Challenge – Dark Horse

Robert Noaker III (born January 31, 2004) is an American racing driver who last competed for McCumbee McAleer Racing in the GS class of the Michelin Pilot Challenge. He is a Ford Racing junior, a two-time IMSA Ford Mustang Challenge champion, and holds two Guinness World Records for precocity.

== Personal life ==
Noaker is the son of Katie and Robert C. Noaker Jr., who ran Noaker's Auto Body from 1999 to 2024, and Robert Noaker Racing since its inception in 2019.

== Career ==
Noaker began karting at the age of 5 on dirt tracks, before moving to asphalt in 2010.

After a short karting career, Noaker made his car racing debut in the Skip Barber MX-5 Summer Series in 2016, at the age of 12. After finishing runner-up in points, Noaker moved to the Spec MX-5 Challenge Series in 2017, in which he took four wins and two pole positions. Moving up to the main Mazda MX-5 Cup in 2018 with Sick Sideways Racing, Noaker won at Mid-Ohio and achieved his first Guinness World Record, as the youngest person to win an IndyCar-sanctioned race at 14 years old. Returning to the series in 2019, Noaker took wins at Road America and Mid-Ohio to end the year fifth. In 2020, Noaker switched to Copeland Motorsports for his third season in the Mazda MX-5 Cup, winning both races at Road America and one each at Mid-Ohio and St. Petersburg to clinch runner-up honors behind Michael Carter. Near the end of the year, Noaker also made his Michelin Pilot Challenge debut for Atlanta Speedwerks at Sebring, finishing sixth in TCR with Brian Henderson.

In 2021, Noaker remained with Atlanta Speedwerks for his rookie season in Michelin Pilot Challenge, sharing a Honda Civic Type R TCR with Henderson. After taking pole at Daytona at 16 years old and earning himself another Guinness World Record, Noaker took further poles at Sebring and Watkins Glen, as well as his only win at the latter venue, to end the season 14th in the TCR standings. Following a season in the TA2 class of the Trans-Am Series and an appearance in its Australian counterpart in 2022, Noaker returned to the Mazda MX-5 Cup in 2023 for his family team. He scored a pair of podiums between Watkins Glen and Road America en route to a seventh-place points finish. That year, Noaker also drove part-time in both the American and Australian Trans-Am Series.

In 2024, Noaker and his family team moved to the new IMSA Ford Mustang Challenge, where he took three wins and six other podiums to seal the Dark Horse title ahead of teammate Tyler Maxson. In 2025, as a member of the newly-created Ford Performance Development Program, Noaker won all 12 races, led every lap and topped every session to clinch his second consecutive title with two races to spare. That year, Noaker made his return to the Michelin Pilot Challenge, now in the top class, partnering Cameron McLeod at KohR Motorsports and finishing third in GS at Indianapolis.

Graduating to the GS class of the Michelin Pilot Challenge full-time in 2026, Noaker switched to McCumbee McAleer Racing to race a Ford Mustang GT4 alongside Nate Cicero. The pair began the season with a podium at Laguna Seca, before finishing second at Watkins Glen and third at Mosport to take the points lead after seven rounds. Paired up with Finn Wiebelhaus for the final three races of the year, Noaker finished no higher than seventh and fell to third in the GS standings.

== Karting record ==
=== Karting career summary ===
Season	Series	Team	Position
2013	WKA Manufacturer's Cup – Yamaha Rookie		9th
2015	SKUSA Pro Tour – TaG Cadet		23rd

== Racing record ==
=== Racing career summary ===
Season	Series	Team	Races	Wins	Poles	F/Laps	Podiums	Points	Position
2016	Skip Barber MX-5 Summer Series			1					**2nd**
2017	Spec MX-5 Challenge Series	Rossini Racing		4	2				
2018	Mazda MX-5 Cup	Sick Sideways Racing	12	1	0	0	1	133	12th
2019	Mazda MX-5 Cup	Sick Sideways Racing	12	2	0	2	4	221	5th
2020	Mazda MX-5 Cup	Copeland Motorsports	12	4	2	3	10	289	**2nd**
2020	Michelin Pilot Challenge – TCR	Atlanta Speedwerks	1	0	0	0	0	25	23rd
2021	Michelin Pilot Challenge – TCR	Atlanta Speedwerks	8	0	3	0	1	1860	14th
2022	Trans-Am Series – TA2		6	0	0	0	0	104	17th
2022	Australian National Trans-Am Series								
2023	Mazda MX-5 Cup	Robert Noaker Racing	14	0	1	1	2	2980	7th
2023	Trans-Am Series – TA2		4	0	0	0	0	194	28th
2023	Australian National Trans-Am Series		6	0	0	0	0	265	20th
2024	IMSA Ford Mustang Challenge – Dark Horse	Robert Noaker Racing	10	3	2	2	9	3270	**1st**
2025	IMSA Ford Mustang Challenge – Dark Horse	Robert Noaker Racing	12	12	12	12	12	3700	**1st**
2025	Michelin Pilot Challenge – GS	KohR Motorsports	1	0	0	0	1	300	52nd
2026	Michelin Pilot Challenge – GS	McCumbee McAleer Racing	10	0	0	0	3	2330	**3rd**

* Season still in progress.
^{†} As Noaker was a guest driver, he was ineligible for points.

=== Complete Michelin Pilot Challenge results ===
(key) (Races in bold indicate pole position) (Races in italics indicate fastest lap)

Year	Entrant	Class	Make	1	2	3	4	5	6	7	8	9	10	Rank	Points
2020	Atlanta Speedwerks	Touring Car	Honda Civic Type R TCR (FK8)	DAY	SEB	ELK	VIR	ATL	MOH; 1	MOH; 2	ATL	LAG	SEB; 6	23rd	25
2021	Atlanta Speedwerks	Touring Car	Honda Civic Type R TCR (FK8)	**DAY**; 11	**SEB**; 15	MOH; 11	**WGI**; **1**; 4	WGI; 2; 1	LIM; 6	ELK; 10	LAG; 10	VIR	ATL	14th	1860
2025	KohR Motorsport	Grand Sport	Ford Mustang GT4 (2024)	DAY	SEB	LGA	MOH	WGL	MOS	ELK	VIR	IMS; 3	ATL	52nd	300
2026	McCumbee McAleer Racing	Grand Sport	Ford Mustang GT4 (2024)	**DAY**; 6	SEB; 8	**LGA**; 3	MOH; 10	WGL; 2	MOS; 3	ELK; 11	VIR; 21	IMS; 7	ATL; 13	3rd	2330
