= 2021 Michelin Pilot Challenge =

Motor racing competition

The 2021 Michelin Pilot Challenge was the twenty-second season of the IMSA SportsCar Challenge and the eighth season organized by the International Motor Sports Association (IMSA).

== Classes ==
- Grand Sport (GS) (run to GT4 regulations)
- Touring Car (TCR)

== Calendar ==
The 2021 schedule was released on September 9, 2020 and features ten rounds.

Rnd	Race	Circuit	Location	Date	Duration
1	BMW Endurance Challenge at Daytona	(United States) Daytona International Speedway	Daytona Beach, Florida	January 29	4 Hours
2	Alan Jay Automotive Network 120	(United States) Sebring International Raceway	Sebring, Florida	March 18	2 Hours
3	Mid-Ohio 120	(United States) Mid-Ohio Sports Car Course	Lexington, Ohio	May 15	2 Hours
4	Tioga Downs Casino Resort 240 at The Glen	(United States) Watkins Glen International	Watkins Glen, New York	June 26	4 Hours
5	Watkins Glen International 120	(United States) Watkins Glen International	Watkins Glen, New York	July 2	2 Hours
6	Lime Rock Park 120	(United States) Lime Rock Park	Lakeville, Connecticut	July 17	2 Hours
7	Road America 120	(United States) Road America	Elkhart Lake, Wisconsin	August 7	2 Hours
8	WeatherTech Raceway Laguna Seca 120	(United States) WeatherTech Raceway Laguna Seca	Monterey, California	September 11	2 Hours
9	Virginia is for Racing Lovers Grand Prix	(United States) Virginia International Raceway	Alton, Virginia	October 10	2 Hours
10	Fox Factory 120	(United States) Michelin Raceway Road Atlanta	Braselton, Georgia	November 12	2 Hours

== Entry list ==
=== Grand Sport ===
Team	Car	Engine	No.	Drivers	Rounds
(United States) Automatic Racing AMR	Aston Martin Vantage AMR GT4	Aston Martin 4.0 L Turbo V8	09	(United States) Brandon Kidd	1–2, 4
(United States) Automatic Racing AMR	Aston Martin Vantage AMR GT4	Aston Martin 4.0 L Turbo V8	09	(United States) Rob Ecklin	1–2, 4–5, 9
(United States) Automatic Racing AMR	Aston Martin Vantage AMR GT4	Aston Martin 4.0 L Turbo V8	09	(United States) Ramin Abdolvahabi	1, 4–5, 9
(United States) Automatic Racing AMR	Aston Martin Vantage AMR GT4	Aston Martin 4.0 L Turbo V8	99	(United States) Ramin Abdolvahabi	7
(United States) Automatic Racing AMR	Aston Martin Vantage AMR GT4	Aston Martin 4.0 L Turbo V8	99	(United States) Michael de Quesada	7
(United States) Automatic Racing AMR	Aston Martin Vantage AMR GT4	Aston Martin 4.0 L Turbo V8	99	(Indonesia) Anderson Tanoto	8
(United States) Automatic Racing AMR	Aston Martin Vantage AMR GT4	Aston Martin 4.0 L Turbo V8	99	(Malaysia) Weiron Tan	8
(Canada) Motorsport in Action	McLaren 570S GT4	McLaren 3.8 L Turbo V8	3	(United States) Sheena Monk	All
(Canada) Motorsport in Action	McLaren 570S GT4	McLaren 3.8 L Turbo V8	3	(United States) Spencer Pigot	All
(United States) Winward Racing	Mercedes-AMG GT4	Mercedes-AMG M178 4.0 L V8	4	(Netherlands) Indy Dontje	1–5, 7–8
(United States) Winward Racing	Mercedes-AMG GT4	Mercedes-AMG M178 4.0 L V8	4	(United States) Russell Ward	1–8
(United States) Winward Racing	Mercedes-AMG GT4	Mercedes-AMG M178 4.0 L V8	4	(Canada) Mikaël Grenier	6
(United States) Winward Racing	Mercedes-AMG GT4	Mercedes-AMG M178 4.0 L V8	57	(United States) Alec Udell	3–8
(United States) Winward Racing	Mercedes-AMG GT4	Mercedes-AMG M178 4.0 L V8	57	(United States) Bryce Ward	3–8
(United States) Forbush Performance	Toyota GR Supra GT4	BMW B58B30 3.0L Twin-Turbo I6	6	(United States) Tom Long	10
(United States) Forbush Performance	Toyota GR Supra GT4	BMW B58B30 3.0L Twin-Turbo I6	6	(United States) Luke Rumberg	10
(United States) VOLT Racing with Archangel Motorsports	Aston Martin Vantage AMR GT4	Aston Martin 4.0 L Turbo V8	7	(United States) Alan Brynjolfsson	All
(United States) VOLT Racing with Archangel Motorsports	Aston Martin Vantage AMR GT4	Aston Martin 4.0 L Turbo V8	7	(United States) Trent Hindman	All
(United States) McCann Racing	Audi R8 LMS GT4 Evo	Audi 5.2 L V10	8	(United States) Andrew Davis	All
(United States) McCann Racing	Audi R8 LMS GT4 Evo	Audi 5.2 L V10	8	(United States) Michael McCann	All
(United States) Goldcrest Motorsports	Porsche 718 Cayman GT4 Clubsport	Porsche 3.8 L Flat-6	9	(United States) Wesley Slimp	10
(United States) Goldcrest Motorsports	Porsche 718 Cayman GT4 Clubsport	Porsche 3.8 L Flat-6	9	(United States) Tyler Hoffman	10
(United States) LAP Motorsports	Mercedes-AMG GT4	Mercedes-AMG M178 4.0 L V8	10	(Australia) Scott Andrews	1–2
(United States) LAP Motorsports	Mercedes-AMG GT4	Mercedes-AMG M178 4.0 L V8	10	(United States) Anton Dias Perera	1–2
(United States) LAP Motorsports	Mercedes-AMG GT4	Mercedes-AMG M178 4.0 L V8	10	(United States) Colin Braun	1
(United States) FCP Euro	Mercedes-AMG GT4	Mercedes-AMG M178 4.0 L V8	11	(United States) Michael Hurczyn	3–7, 9
(United States) FCP Euro	Mercedes-AMG GT4	Mercedes-AMG M178 4.0 L V8	11	(United States) Nate Vincent	3–7, 9
(Canada) AWA	McLaren 570S GT4	McLaren 3.8 L Turbo V8	13	(Canada) Kuno Wittmer	All
(Canada) AWA	McLaren 570S GT4	McLaren 3.8 L Turbo V8	13	(Canada) Orey Fidani	1–2, 4–10
(Canada) AWA	McLaren 570S GT4	McLaren 3.8 L Turbo V8	13	(Canada) Chris Green	3
(United States) TGR Riley Motorsports	Toyota GR Supra GT4	BMW B58B30 3.0L Twin-Turbo I6	14	(Dominican Republic) Alfredo Najri	1–8, 10
(United States) TGR Riley Motorsports	Toyota GR Supra GT4	BMW B58B30 3.0L Twin-Turbo I6	14	(Costa Rica) Javier Quiros	1–4, 7, 9
(United States) TGR Riley Motorsports	Toyota GR Supra GT4	BMW B58B30 3.0L Twin-Turbo I6	14	(Argentina) Julián Santero	1
(United States) TGR Riley Motorsports	Toyota GR Supra GT4	BMW B58B30 3.0L Twin-Turbo I6	14	(Brazil) Felipe Fraga	4
(United States) TGR Riley Motorsports	Toyota GR Supra GT4	BMW B58B30 3.0L Twin-Turbo I6	14	(Brazil) Pierre Kleinubing	5, 10
(United States) TGR Riley Motorsports	Toyota GR Supra GT4	BMW B58B30 3.0L Twin-Turbo I6	14	(France) Sacha Fenestraz	6
(United States) TGR Riley Motorsports	Toyota GR Supra GT4	BMW B58B30 3.0L Twin-Turbo I6	14	(Brazil) Thiago Camilo	8
(United States) TGR Riley Motorsports	Toyota GR Supra GT4	BMW B58B30 3.0L Twin-Turbo I6	14	(Costa Rica) Milo Valverde	9
(United States) TGR Riley Motorsports	Toyota GR Supra GT4	BMW B58B30 3.0L Twin-Turbo I6	21	(Australia) Scott Andrews	3–4, 6–10
(United States) TGR Riley Motorsports	Toyota GR Supra GT4	BMW B58B30 3.0L Twin-Turbo I6	21	(United States) Anton Dias Perera	3–4, 6–10
(United States) TGR Riley Motorsports	Toyota GR Supra GT4	BMW B58B30 3.0L Twin-Turbo I6	21	(United States) Colin Braun	4
(United States) Wright Motorsports	Porsche 718 Cayman GT4 Clubsport	Porsche 3.8 L Flat-6	16	(Belgium) Jan Heylen	All
(United States) Wright Motorsports	Porsche 718 Cayman GT4 Clubsport	Porsche 3.8 L Flat-6	16	(United States) Ryan Hardwick	1, 3–7, 9–10
(United States) Wright Motorsports	Porsche 718 Cayman GT4 Clubsport	Porsche 3.8 L Flat-6	16	(United States) Max Root	2, 8
(United States) CB Motorsports	Mercedes-AMG GT4	Mercedes-AMG M178 4.0 L V8	18	(United States) Trenton Estep	7–10
(United States) CB Motorsports	Mercedes-AMG GT4	Mercedes-AMG M178 4.0 L V8	18	(United States) Mark Kvamme	7–10
(United States) Notlad Racing by RS1	Aston Martin Vantage AMR GT4	Aston Martin 4.0 L Turbo V8	23	(United States) Matt Dalton	1
(United States) Notlad Racing by RS1	Aston Martin Vantage AMR GT4	Aston Martin 4.0 L Turbo V8	23	(United States) Patrick Gallagher	1, 4, 6–7, 9–10
(United States) Notlad Racing by RS1	Aston Martin Vantage AMR GT4	Aston Martin 4.0 L Turbo V8	23	(United Kingdom) Stevan McAleer	4, 6–7, 9–10
(United States) Blackdog Speed Shop	McLaren 570S GT4	McLaren 3.8 L Turbo V8	34	(United States) Michael Cooper	4, 7
(United States) Blackdog Speed Shop	McLaren 570S GT4	McLaren 3.8 L Turbo V8	34	(United States) Spencer Pumpelly	4
(United States) Blackdog Speed Shop	McLaren 570S GT4	McLaren 3.8 L Turbo V8	34	(United States) Tony Gaples	7
(United States) FraSun Racing	BMW M4 GT4	BMW N55 3.0 L Twin-Turbo I6	37	(United States) Jason Fraser	1
(United States) FraSun Racing	BMW M4 GT4	BMW N55 3.0 L Twin-Turbo I6	37	(United States) Mark Sundberg	1
(United States) BGB Motorsports	Porsche 718 Cayman GT4 Clubsport	Porsche 3.8 L Flat-6	38	(United States) Thomas Collingwood	1
(United States) BGB Motorsports	Porsche 718 Cayman GT4 Clubsport	Porsche 3.8 L Flat-6	38	(United States) Spencer Pumpelly	1
(United States) BGB Motorsports	Porsche 718 Cayman GT4 Clubsport	Porsche 3.8 L Flat-6	38	(United States) John Tecce	1
(United States) PF Racing	Ford Mustang GT4	Ford 5.2 L Voodoo V8	40	(United States) Chad McCumbee	1–5, 7–10
(United States) PF Racing	Ford Mustang GT4	Ford 5.2 L Voodoo V8	40	(United States) James Pesek	1–5, 7–10
(United States) NTE Sport	Audi R8 LMS GT4 Evo	Audi 5.2 L V10	41	(United States) Jean-Francois Brunot	10
(United States) NTE Sport	Audi R8 LMS GT4 Evo	Audi 5.2 L V10	41	(China) Kerong Li	10
(United States) American Wheelman	Ford Mustang GT4	Ford 5.2 L Voodoo V8	42	(United States) Jack Roush Jr.	3
(United States) American Wheelman	Ford Mustang GT4	Ford 5.2 L Voodoo V8	42	(United States) Nate Stacy	3
(United States) Stephen Cameron Racing	BMW M4 GT4	BMW N55 3.0 L Twin-Turbo I6	43	(United States) Greg Liefooghe	1–2, 8
(United States) Stephen Cameron Racing	BMW M4 GT4	BMW N55 3.0 L Twin-Turbo I6	43	(United States) Sean Quinlan	1–2, 8
(United States) Team TGM	Chevrolet Camaro GT4.R	Chevrolet LT1 6.2 L V8	46	(United States) Hugh Plumb	All
(United States) Team TGM	Chevrolet Camaro GT4.R	Chevrolet LT1 6.2 L V8	46	(United States) Matt Plumb	All
(United States) Team TGM	Chevrolet Camaro GT4.R	Chevrolet LT1 6.2 L V8	64	(United States) Ted Giovanis	All
(United States) Team TGM	Chevrolet Camaro GT4.R	Chevrolet LT1 6.2 L V8	64	(United States) Owen Trinkler	All
(United States) Team TGM	Chevrolet Camaro GT4.R	Chevrolet LT1 6.2 L V8	64	(United States) Hugh Plumb	1
(United States) Auto Technic Racing	BMW M4 GT4	BMW N55 3.0 L Twin-Turbo I6	52	(United States) Attilio Albani	6
(United States) Auto Technic Racing	BMW M4 GT4	BMW N55 3.0 L Twin-Turbo I6	52	(United States) Elivan Goulart	6
(United States) Murillo Racing	Mercedes-AMG GT4	Mercedes-AMG M178 4.0 L V8	56	(United States) Eric Foss	All
(United States) Murillo Racing	Mercedes-AMG GT4	Mercedes-AMG M178 4.0 L V8	56	(United States) Jeff Mosing	1–8
(United States) Murillo Racing	Mercedes-AMG GT4	Mercedes-AMG M178 4.0 L V8	56	(United States) Kenny Murillo	9–10
(United States) Murillo Racing	Mercedes-AMG GT4	Mercedes-AMG M178 4.0 L V8	65	(United States) Brent Mosing	All
(United States) Murillo Racing	Mercedes-AMG GT4	Mercedes-AMG M178 4.0 L V8	65	(United States) Tim Probert	1–6, 8–10
(United States) Murillo Racing	Mercedes-AMG GT4	Mercedes-AMG M178 4.0 L V8	65	(United States) Kenny Murillo	1, 4, 7
(United States) KohR Motorsports	Ford Mustang GT4	Ford 5.2 L Voodoo V8	59	(United States) Chuck Cassaro	1
(United States) KohR Motorsports	Ford Mustang GT4	Ford 5.2 L Voodoo V8	59	(Canada) Kyle Marcelli	1, 10
(United States) KohR Motorsports	Ford Mustang GT4	Ford 5.2 L Voodoo V8	59	(United States) Dean Martin	1, 10
(United States) Capstone Motorsports	Mercedes-AMG GT4	Mercedes-AMG M178 4.0 L V8	60	(United States) John Allen	4
(United States) Capstone Motorsports	Mercedes-AMG GT4	Mercedes-AMG M178 4.0 L V8	60	(United States) Gary Ferrera	4, 7–8
(United States) Capstone Motorsports	Mercedes-AMG GT4	Mercedes-AMG M178 4.0 L V8	60	(United States) Kris Wilson	4, 7–8
(United States) Rebel Rock Racing	Chevrolet Camaro GT4.R	Chevrolet LT1 6.2 L V8	71	(United States) Frank DePew	1–7, 9–10
(United States) Rebel Rock Racing	Chevrolet Camaro GT4.R	Chevrolet LT1 6.2 L V8	71	(United Kingdom) Robin Liddell	1–7, 9–10
(United States) BimmerWorld Racing	BMW M4 GT4	BMW N55 3.0 L Twin-Turbo I6	82	(United States) James Clay	1
(United States) BimmerWorld Racing	BMW M4 GT4	BMW N55 3.0 L Twin-Turbo I6	82	(United States) Nick Galante	1
(United States) BimmerWorld Racing	BMW M4 GT4	BMW N55 3.0 L Twin-Turbo I6	82	(United States) Mike Skeen	1
(United States) FastMD Racing	Audi R8 LMS GT4 Evo	Audi 5.2 L V10	83	(United States) Alexandre Papadopulos	1–6
(United States) FastMD Racing	Audi R8 LMS GT4 Evo	Audi 5.2 L V10	83	(Canada) James Vance	1–6
(United States) CarBahn Motorsports with Peregrine Racing	Audi R8 LMS GT4 Evo	Audi 5.2 L V10	93	(United States) Tom Dyer	1–8
(United States) CarBahn Motorsports with Peregrine Racing	Audi R8 LMS GT4 Evo	Audi 5.2 L V10	93	(United States) Tyler McQuarrie	1, 9–10
(United States) CarBahn Motorsports with Peregrine Racing	Audi R8 LMS GT4 Evo	Audi 5.2 L V10	93	(United States) Nolan Siegel	1, 4, 6, 10
(United States) CarBahn Motorsports with Peregrine Racing	Audi R8 LMS GT4 Evo	Audi 5.2 L V10	93	(United States) Sameer Gandhi	2, 5, 8
(United States) CarBahn Motorsports with Peregrine Racing	Audi R8 LMS GT4 Evo	Audi 5.2 L V10	93	(United States) Mark Siegel	3–4, 7, 9
(United States) Turner Motorsport	BMW M4 GT4	BMW N55 3.0 L Twin-Turbo I6	95	(United States) Bill Auberlen	All
(United States) Turner Motorsport	BMW M4 GT4	BMW N55 3.0 L Twin-Turbo I6	95	(United States) Dillon Machavern	All
(United States) Turner Motorsport	BMW M4 GT4	BMW N55 3.0 L Twin-Turbo I6	96	(United States) Vin Barletta	All
(United States) Turner Motorsport	BMW M4 GT4	BMW N55 3.0 L Twin-Turbo I6	96	(United States) Robby Foley	All

=== Touring Car ===
Team	Car	No.	Drivers	Rounds
(United States) KMW Motorsports with TMR Engineering	Alfa Romeo Giulietta Veloce TCR	5	(Argentina) Roy Block	All
(United States) KMW Motorsports with TMR Engineering	Alfa Romeo Giulietta Veloce TCR	5	(United States) Tim Lewis Jr.	All
(United States) Rockwell Autosport Development	Audi RS 3 LMS TCR	15	(Venezuela) Nelson Canache	1
(United States) Rockwell Autosport Development	Audi RS 3 LMS TCR	15	(United States) Mike Moore	1
(United States) Rockwell Autosport Development	Audi RS 3 LMS TCR	15	(United States) Alex Rockwell	1, 5, 9–10
(United States) Rockwell Autosport Development	Audi RS 3 LMS TCR	15	(United States) Eric Rockwell	5, 9–10
(United States) Unitronic JDC-Miller MotorSports	Audi RS 3 LMS TCR	17	(United States) Chris Miller	All
(United States) Unitronic JDC-Miller MotorSports	Audi RS 3 LMS TCR	17	(South Africa) Mikey Taylor	All
(United States) Unitronic JDC-Miller MotorSports	Audi RS 3 LMS TCR	17	(United States) William Tally	1, 4
(United States) Van Der Steur Racing LLC	Hyundai Veloster N TCR	19	(Belgium) Denis Dupont	All
(United States) Van Der Steur Racing LLC	Hyundai Veloster N TCR	19	(United States) Rory van der Steur	All
(United States) Copeland Motorsports	Hyundai Veloster N TCR	27	(United States) Tyler Gonzalez	All
(United States) Copeland Motorsports	Hyundai Veloster N TCR	27	(United States) Tyler Maxson	All
(United States) Copeland Motorsports	Hyundai Veloster N TCR	51	(United States) Mason Filippi	All
(United States) Copeland Motorsports	Hyundai Veloster N TCR	51	(United States) AJ Muss	All
(United States) Bryan Herta Autosport with Curb-Agajanian	Hyundai Elantra N TCR	33	(United States) Harry Gottsacker	All
(United States) Bryan Herta Autosport with Curb-Agajanian	Hyundai Elantra N TCR	33	(Canada) Mark Wilkins	All
(United States) Bryan Herta Autosport with Curb-Agajanian	Hyundai Elantra N TCR	98	(United States) Parker Chase	All
(United States) Bryan Herta Autosport with Curb-Agajanian	Hyundai Elantra N TCR	98	(United States) Ryan Norman	1–4, 6–10
(United States) Bryan Herta Autosport with Curb-Agajanian	Hyundai Elantra N TCR	98	(Colombia) Gabby Chaves	5
(United States) Bryan Herta Autosport with Curb-Agajanian	Hyundai Veloster N TCR	77	(United States) Michael Lewis	All
(United States) Bryan Herta Autosport with Curb-Agajanian	Hyundai Veloster N TCR	77	(United States) Taylor Hagler	All
(United States) New German Performance	Audi RS 3 LMS TCR	44	(United States) Tristan Herbert	9–10
(United States) New German Performance	Audi RS 3 LMS TCR	44	(United States) Britt Casey	9
(United States) New German Performance	Audi RS 3 LMS TCR	44	(United States) Cliff Brown	10
(United States) Michael Johnson Racing	Hyundai Veloster N TCR	54	(United States) Michael Johnson	All
(United States) Michael Johnson Racing	Hyundai Veloster N TCR	54	(South Africa) Stephen Simpson	All
(United States) Road Shagger Racing	Audi RS 3 LMS TCR	61	(United Kingdom) Gavin Ernstone	All
(United States) Road Shagger Racing	Audi RS 3 LMS TCR	61	(United States) Jonathan Morley	All
(United States) LA Honda World Racing	Honda Civic Type R TCR (FK8)	73	(United States) Mike LaMarra	1–3
(United States) LA Honda World Racing	Honda Civic Type R TCR (FK8)	73	(United States) Mat Pombo	1–3
(United States) CB Motorsports	Hyundai Veloster N TCR	81	(United States) Trenton Estep	1–6
(United States) CB Motorsports	Hyundai Veloster N TCR	81	(United States) Mark Kvamme	1–6
(United States) CB Motorsports	Hyundai Veloster N TCR	81	(United States) Caleb Bacon	1, 10
(United States) CB Motorsports	Hyundai Veloster N TCR	81	(United States) Coby Shield	10
(United States) Atlanta Speedwerks	Honda Civic Type R TCR (FK8)	84	(United States) Brian Henderson	1–9
(United States) Atlanta Speedwerks	Honda Civic Type R TCR (FK8)	84	(United States) Robert Noaker	1–8
(United States) Atlanta Speedwerks	Honda Civic Type R TCR (FK8)	84	(United States) Ryan Eversley	9
(United States) Atlanta Speedwerks	Honda Civic Type R TCR (FK8)	94	(United States) Ryan Eversley	1–8, 10
(United States) Atlanta Speedwerks	Honda Civic Type R TCR (FK8)	94	(United States) Greg Strelzoff	1–2
(United States) Atlanta Speedwerks	Honda Civic Type R TCR (FK8)	94	(United States) Todd Lamb	1, 4
(United States) Atlanta Speedwerks	Honda Civic Type R TCR (FK8)	94	(United States) Scott Smithson	3, 5–8
(United States) Atlanta Speedwerks	Honda Civic Type R TCR (FK8)	94	(United States) Tyler Stone	10
(United States) AOA Racing	Audi RS 3 LMS TCR	85	(United States) Gino Manley	1, 10
(United States) AOA Racing	Audi RS 3 LMS TCR	85	(United States) Patrick Wilmot	1, 10
(United States) AOA Racing	Audi RS 3 LMS TCR	85	(United States) Andrew Pinkerton	1
(Puerto Rico) VGMC Racing	Honda Civic Type R TCR (FK8)	88	(Puerto Rico) Victor González Jr.	1–4, 6–10
(Puerto Rico) VGMC Racing	Honda Civic Type R TCR (FK8)	88	(Puerto Rico) Ruben Iglesias	1–3
(Puerto Rico) VGMC Racing	Honda Civic Type R TCR (FK8)	88	(Canada) Karl Wittmer	4, 6–10
(Puerto Rico) VGMC Racing	Honda Civic Type R TCR (FK8)	88	(United States) Jon Miller	5
(Puerto Rico) VGMC Racing	Honda Civic Type R TCR (FK8)	88	(United States) Lance Bergstein	5
(Canada) TWOth A.sport/Bestline	Audi RS 3 LMS TCR	89	(Canada) Travis Hill	10
(Canada) TWOth A.sport/Bestline	Audi RS 3 LMS TCR	89	(Canada) Marco Cirone	10

== Race results ==
Bold indicates overall winner.

Round	Circuit	GS Winning Car	TCR Winning Car
Round	Circuit	GS Winning Drivers	TCR Winning Drivers
1	Daytona	**(Canada) #13 AWA**	(United States) #17 JDC-Miller MotorSports
1	Daytona	**(Canada) Orey Fidani** **(Canada) Kuno Wittmer**	(United States) Chris Miller (United States) William Tally (South Africa) Mikey Taylor
2	Sebring	**(United States) #71 Rebel Rock Racing**	(United States) #61 Road Shagger Racing
2	Sebring	**(United States) Frank DePew** **(United Kingdom) Robin Liddell**	(United Kingdom) Gavin Ernstone (United States) Jonathan Morley
3	Mid-Ohio	**(Canada) #13 AWA**	(United States) #98 Bryan Herta Autosport with Curb-Agajanian
3	Mid-Ohio	**(Canada) Chris Green** **(Canada) Kuno Wittmer**	(United States) Parker Chase (United States) Ryan Norman
4	Watkins Glen	**(United States) #23 Notlad Racing by RS1**	(United States) #94 Atlanta Speedwerks
4	Watkins Glen	**(United States) Patrick Gallagher** **(United Kingdom) Stevan McAleer**	(United States) Ryan Eversley (United States) Todd Lamb
5	Watkins Glen	**(United States) #95 Turner Motorsport**	(United States) #84 Atlanta Speedwerks
5	Watkins Glen	**(United States) Bill Auberlen** **(United States) Dillon Machavern**	(United States) Brian Henderson (United States) Robert Noaker
6	Lime Rock	**(United States) #56 Murillo Racing**	(United States) #77 Bryan Herta Autosport with Curb-Agajanian
6	Lime Rock	**(United States) Eric Foss** **(United States) Jeff Mosing**	(United States) Michael Lewis (United States) Taylor Hagler
7	Road America	**(United States) #95 Turner Motorsport**	(United States) #5 KMW Motorsports with TMR Engineering
7	Road America	**(United States) Bill Auberlen** **(United States) Dillon Machavern**	(Argentina) Roy Block (United States) Tim Lewis Jr.
8	Laguna Seca	**(United States) #16 Wright Motorsports**	(United States) #33 Bryan Herta Autosport with Curb-Agajanian
8	Laguna Seca	**(Belgium) Jan Heylen** **(United States) Max Root**	(United States) Harry Gottsacker (Canada) Mark Wilkins
9	Virginia	**(United States) #16 Wright Motorsports**	(United States) #17 JDC-Miller MotorSports
9	Virginia	**(Belgium) Jan Heylen** **(United States) Ryan Hardwick**	(United States) Chris Miller (South Africa) Mikey Taylor
10	Road Atlanta	**(United States) #16 Wright Motorsports**	(United States) #5 KMW Motorsports with TMR Engineering
10	Road Atlanta	**(Belgium) Jan Heylen** **(United States) Ryan Hardwick**	(Argentina) Roy Block (United States) Tim Lewis Jr.

== Championship standings ==
=== Points systems ===
Championship points are awarded in each class at the finish of each event. Points are awarded based on finishing positions in the race as shown in the chart below.

Position	1	2	3	4	5	6	7	8	9	10	11	12	13	14	15	16	17	18	19	20	21	22	23	24	25	26	27	28	29	30+
Race	350	320	300	280	260	250	240	230	220	210	200	190	180	170	160	150	140	130	120	110	100	90	80	70	60	50	40	30	20	10

Drivers points

Points are awarded in each class at the finish of each event.

Team points

Team points are calculated in exactly the same way as driver points, using the point distribution chart. Each car entered is considered its own "team" regardless if it is a single entry or part of a two-car team.

Manufacturer points

There are also a number of manufacturer championships which utilize the same season-long point distribution chart. The manufacturer championships recognized by IMSA are as follows:

Grand Sport (GS): Car manufacturer
Touring Car (TCR): Car manufacturer

Each manufacturer receives finishing points for its highest finishing car in each class. The positions of subsequent finishing cars from the same manufacturer are not taken into consideration, and all other manufacturers move up in the order.

Example: Manufacturer A finishes 1st and 2nd at an event, and Manufacturer B finishes 3rd. Manufacturer A receives 35 first-place points while Manufacturer B would earn 32 second-place points.

=== Driver's Championships ===
==== Standings: Grand Sport (GS) ====
Pos.	Drivers	DAY	SEB	MOH	WGL1	WGL2	LIM	ELK	LGA	VIR	ATL	Points
1	(Belgium) Jan Heylen	WD	**2**	**2**	4	2	3	22	1	1	1	2680
2	(United States) Bill Auberlen (United States) Dillon Machavern	2	3	21	2	**1**	16	**1**	14	**3**	18	2490
3	(United States) Alan Brynjolfsson (United States) Trent Hindman	21	4	17	8	7	4	8	5	2	5	2340
4	(United States) Vin Barletta (United States) Robby Foley	3	7	5	11	5	8	4	6	11	19	2340
5	(Canada) Kuno Wittmer	**1**	9	1	**14**	15	17	12	19	7	3	2240
6	(United States) Sheena Monk (United States) Spencer Pigot	9	8	4	3	6	21	6	9	8	15	2240
7	(United States) Andrew Davis (United States) Michael McCann	11	12	6	7	8	12	5	7	18	4	2210
8	(United States) Eric Foss	23	10	15	6	11	1	7	4	10	16	2130
9	(United States) Hugh Plumb (United States) Matt Plumb	6	19	11	5	3	7	13	11	9	20	2070
10	(United States) Ryan Hardwick	WD		**2**	4	2	3	22		1	1	2010
11	(Canada) Orey Fidani	**1**	9		**14**	15	17	12	19	7	3	1890
12	(United States) Russell Ward	8	6	7	21	4	14	3	2			1890
13	(United States) Brent Mosing	13	14	13	10	18	15	10	16	14	9	1780
14	(United States) Jeff Mosing	23	10	15	6	11	1	7	4			1770
15	(Netherlands) Indy Dontje	8	6	7	21	4		3	2			1720
16	(Dominican Republic) Alfredo Najri	7	20	9	22	9	5	17	8		17	1650
17	(United States) Ted Giovanis (United States) Owen Trinkler	16	17	20	13	14	10	14	17	15	13	1610
18	(United States) Chad McCumbee (United States) James Pesek	10	18	19	15	10		18	13	6	12	1580
19	(United States) Tim Probert	13	14	13	10	18	15		16	14	9	1570
20	(United States) Alex Udell (United States) Bryce Ward			3	9	12	13	2	3			1510
21	(United States) Patrick Gallagher	14			1		**2**	11		19	7	1400
22	(United States) Frank DePew (United Kingdom) Robin Liddell	19	1	14	24	20	19	DNS		4	14	1390
23	(Australia) Scott Andrews (United States) Anton Dias Perera	22	11	12	20		20	21	21	16	2	1370
24	(United Kingdom) Stevan McAleer				1		**2**	11		19	7	1230
25	(United States) Tom Dyer	17	16	18	12	19	6	23	15			1220
26	(United States) Michael Hurczyn (United States) Nate Vincent			10	18	17	9	19		12		1010
27	(United States) Alexandre Papadopulos (Canada) James Vance	12	15	8	23	13	18					970
28	(United States) Kenny Murillo	13			10			10		10	**16**	960
29	(Costa Rica) Javier Quiros	7	20	9	22			17		17		940
30	(United States) Trenton Estep (United States) Mark Kvamme							16	18	5	6	790
31	(United States) Rob Ecklin	18	13		16	16				13		790
32	(United States) Greg Liefooghe (United States) Sean Quinlan	5	5						10			730
33	(United States) Ramin Abdolvahabi	18			16	16		20		13		720
34	(United States) Nolan Siegel	17			12		6				21	690
35	(United States) Max Root		**2**						**1**			670
36	(United States) Mark Siegel			18	12			23		20		510
37	(United States) Gary Ferrara (United States) Kris Wilson				17			15	12			490
38	(United States) Brandon Kidd	18	13		16							460
39	(United States) Sameer Gandhi		16			19			15			430
40	(Brazil) Pierre Kleinubing					9					17	360
41	(United States) Tyler McQuarrie	17								20	20	360
42	(Canada) Chris Green			1								350
43	(United States) Michael Cooper				19			9				340
44	(United States) James Clay (United States) Nick Galante (United States) Mike Skeen	4										280
45	(France) Sacha Fenestraz						5					260
46	(Argentina) Julián Santero	7										240
47	(Brazil) Thiago Camilo								8			230
48	(United States) Luke Rumberg (United States) Tom Long										8	230
49	(United States) Spencer Pumpelly	20			19							230
50	(United States) Tony Gaples							9				220
51	(United States) Tyler Hoffman (United States) Wesley Slimp										10	210
52	(United States) Attilio Albani (United States) Elivan Goulart						11					200
53	(United States) Jean-Francois Brunot (China) Kerong Li										11	200
54	(United States) Colin Braun	22			20							200
55	(United States) Matt Dalton	14										170
56	(Canada) Mikaël Grenier						14					170
57	(United States) Jason Fraser (United States) Mark Sundberg	15										160
58	(United States) Jack Roush Jr. (United States) Nate Stacy			16								150
59	(United States) John Allen				17							140
60	(Costa Rica) Milo Valverde									17		140
61	(United States) Thomas Collingwood (United States) John Tecce	20										110
62	(United States) Michael de Quesada							20				110
63	(Malaysia) Weiron Tan (Indonesia) Anderson Tanoto								20			110
64	(Brazil) Felipe Fraga				22							90
65	(Canada) Kyle Marcelli (United States) Dean Martin	24									DNS	70
66	(United States) Chuck Cassaro	24										70
Pos.	Drivers	DAY	SEB	MOH	WGL1	WGL2	LIM	ELK	LGA	VIR	ATL	Points

Colour	Result
Gold	Winner
Silver	Second place
Bronze	Third place
Green	Points classification
Blue	Non-points classification
Blue	Non-classified finish (NC)
Purple	Retired, not classified (Ret)
Red	Did not qualify (DNQ)
Red	Did not pre-qualify (DNPQ)
Black	Disqualified (DSQ)
White	Did not start (DNS)
White	Withdrew (WD)
White	Race cancelled (C)
Blank	Did not practice (DNP)
Blank	Did not arrive (DNA)
Blank	Excluded (EX)

**Bold** - Pole position

Italics - Fastest lap

==== Standings: Touring Car (TCR) ====
Pos.	Drivers	DAY	SEB	MOH	WGL1	WGL2	LIM	ELK	LGA	VIR	ATL	Points
1	(United States) Michael Lewis (United States) Taylor Hagler	4	3	2	3	3	1	11	3	5	5	2870
2	(United States) Parker Chase	9	10	1	2	6	10	3	2	11	4	2660
3	(Argentina) Roy Block (United States) Tim Lewis Jr.	12	4	7	7	7	2	1	13	10	1	2600
4	(United States) Ryan Eversley	2	7	3	1	15	8	9	9	7	2	2600
5	(United States) Harry Gottsacker (Canada) Mark Wilkins	6	8	5	10	**10**	5	4	1	3	11	2550
6	(United States) Michael Johnson (South Africa) Stephen Simpson	3	5	12	6	5	7	8	6	2	7	2540
7	(United States) Chris Miller (South Africa) Mikey Taylor	1	12	**14**	9	12	4	5	4	1	15	2450
8	(United States) Ryan Norman	9	10	1	2		10	**3**	2	11	4	2410
9	(United Kingdom) Gavin Ernstone (United States) Jonathan Morley	13	1	6	11	2	11	6	8	14	6	2400
10	(United States) Tyler Gonzalez (United States) Tyler Maxson	15	13	4	14	14	**3**	7	11	4	3	2280
11	(United States) Mason Filippi (United States) AJ Muss	5	6	10	12	4	14	13	7	13	10	2170
12	(United States) Brian Henderson	**11**	**15**	11	**4**	1	6	10	10	7		2100
13	(Belgium) Denis Dupont (United States) Rory van der Steur	8	9	15	5	13	13	2	5	9	DNS	2030
14	(United States) Robert Noaker	**11**	**15**	11	**4**	1	6	10	10			1860
15	(Puerto Rico) Victor González Jr.	16	11	13	13		9	12	12	12	14	1670
16	(United States) Trenton Estep (United States) Mark Kvamme	14	14	9	8	8	12					1210
17	(Canada) Karl Wittmer				13		9	12	12	12	14	1140
18	(United States) Scott Smithson			3		15	8	9	9			1130
19	(United States) Alex Rockwell	10				9				8	9	880
20	(United States) Mike LaMarra (United States) Mat Pombo	17	2	8								690
21	(United States) Todd Lamb	2			1							670
22	(United States) Eric Rockwell					9				8	9	670
23	(United States) William Tally	1			9							570
24	(United States) Greg Strelzoff	2	7									560
25	(Puerto Rico) Ruben Iglesias	16	11	13								530
26	(United States) Gino Manley (United States) Patrick Wilmot	7									8	470
27	(United States) Tristan Herbert									6	12	440
28	(United States) Tyler Stone										2	320
29	(United States) Caleb Bacon	14									16	320
30	(Colombia) Gabby Chaves					6						250
31	(United States) Britt Casey									6		250
32	(United States) Andrew Pinkerton	7										240
33	(Venezuela) Nelson Canache (United States) Mike Moore	10										210
34	(United States) Jon Miller (United States) Lance Bergstein					11						200
35	(United States) Cliff Brown										12	190
36	(Canada) Marco Cirone (Canada) Travis Hill										13	180
37	(United States) Coby Shield										16	150
Pos.	Drivers	DAY	SEB	MOH	WGL1	WGL2	LIM	ELK	LGA	VIR	ATL	Points

=== Team's Championships ===
==== Standings: Grand Sport (GS) ====
Pos.	Team	Car	DAY	SEB	MOH	WGL1	WGL2	LIM	ELK	LGA	VIR	ATL	Points
1	#16 Wright Motorsports	Porsche 718 Cayman GT4 Clubsport	WD	**2**	**2**	4	2	3	22	**1**	1	1	2680
2	#95 Turner Motorsport	BMW M4 GT4	2	3	21	2	**1**	16	**1**	14	**3**	18	2490
3	#7 VOLT Racing with Archangel	Aston Martin Vantage AMR GT4	21	4	17	8	7	4	8	5	2	5	2340
4	#96 Turner Motorsport	BMW M4 GT4	3	7	5	11	5	8	4	6	11	19	2340
5	#13 AWA	McLaren 570S GT4	**1**	9	1	**14**	15	17	12	19	7	3	2240
6	#3 Motorsports in Action	McLaren 570S GT4	9	8	4	3	6	21	6	9	8	15	2240
7	#8 McCann Racing	Audi R8 LMS GT4 Evo	11	12	6	7	8	12	5	7	18	4	2210
8	#56 Murillo Racing	Mercedes-AMG GT4	23	10	15	6	11	1	7	4	10	**16**	2130
9	#46 Team TGM	Chevrolet Camaro GT4.R	6	19	11	5	3	7	13	11	9	21	2070
10	#4 Winward Racing	Mercedes-AMG GT4	8	6	7	21	4	14	3	2			1890
11	#14 Riley Motorsports	Toyota GR Supra GT4	7	20	9	22	9	5	17	8	17	17	1790
12	#65 Murillo Racing	Mercedes-AMG GT4	13	14	13	10	18	15	10	16	14	9	1780
13	#64 TeamTGM	Chevrolet Camaro GT4.R	16	17	20	13	14	10	14	17	15	13	1610
14	#40 PF Racing	Ford Mustang GT4	10	18	19	15	10		18	13	6	12	1580
15	#57 Winward Racing	Mercedes-AMG GT4			3	9	12	13	2	3			1510
16	#93 Car Bahn with Peregrine	Audi R8 LMS GT4 Evo	17	16	18	12	19	6	23	15	20	20	1440
17	#23 Notlad Racing by RS1	Aston Martin Vantage AMR GT4	14			1		**2**	11		19	7	1400
18	#71 Rebel Rock Racing	Chevrolet Camaro GT4.R	19	1	14	24	20	19	DNS		4	14	1390
19	#21 Riley Motorsports	Toyota GR Supra GT4			12	20		20	21	21	16	2	1080
20	#11 FCP Euro	Mercedes-AMG GT4			10	18	17	9	19		12		1010
21	#83 FastMD Racing	Audi R8 LMS GT4 Evo	12	15	8	23	13	18					970
22	#18 CB Motorsports	Mercedes-AMG GT4							16	18	5	6	790
23	#09 Automatic Racing	Aston Martin Vantage AMR GT4	18	13		16	16				13		790
24	#43 Stephen Cameron Racing LLC	BMW M4 GT4	5	5						10			730
25	#60 Capstone Motorsports	Mercedes-AMG GT4				17			15	12			490
26	#34 Blackdog Speed Shop	McLaren 570S GT4				19			9				340
27	#10 LAP Motorsports	Mercedes-AMG GT4	22	11									290
28	#82 BimmerWorld	BMW M4 GT4	4										280
29	#6 Forbush Performance	Toyota GR Supra GT4										8	230
30	#99 Automatic Racing	Aston Martin Vantage AMR GT4							20	20			220
31	#9 Goldcrest Motorsports	Porsche 718 Cayman GT4 Clubsport										10	210
32	#52 Auto Technic Racing	BMW M4 GT4						11					200
33	#41 NTE Sport	Audi R8 LMS GT4 Evo										11	200
34	#37 FraSun Racing	BMW M4 GT4	15										160
35	#42 American Wheelman	Ford Mustang GT4			16								150
36	#38 BGB Motorsports	Porsche 718 Cayman GT4 Clubsport	20										110
37	#59 KohR Motorsports	Ford Mustang GT4	24									DNS	70
Pos.	Team	Car	DAY	SEB	MOH	WGL1	WGL2	LIM	ELK	LGA	VIR	ATL	Points

==== Standings: Touring Car (TCR) ====
Pos.	Team	Car	DAY	SEB	MOH	WGL1	WGL2	LIM	ELK	LGA	VIR	ATL	Points
1	#77 Bryan Herta Autosport w/ Curb-Agajanian	Hyundai Veloster N TCR	4	3	2	3	3	1	11	3	5	5	2870
2	#98 Bryan Herta Autosport w/ Curb-Agajanian	Hyundai Elantra N TCR	9	10	1	2	6	10	**3**	2	11	**4**	2660
3	#5 KMW Motorsports with TMR Engineering	Alfa Romeo Giulietta Veloce TCR	12	4	7	7	7	2	1	13	10	1	2600
4	#33 Bryan Herta Autosport w/ Curb-Agajanian	Hyundai Elantra N TCR	6	8	5	10	**10**	5	4	1	**3**	11	2550
5	#54 Michael Johnson Racing	Hyundai Veloster N TCR	3	5	12	6	5	7	8	6	2	7	2540
6	#17 Unitronic JDC-Miller MotorSports	Audi RS 3 LMS TCR	1	12	**14**	9	12	4	5	4	1	15	2450
7	#61 Road Shagger Racing	Audi RS 3 LMS TCR	13	1	6	11	2	11	6	8	14	6	2400
8	#94 Atlanta Speedwerks	Honda Civic Type R TCR (FK8)	2	7	3	1	15	8	9	9		2	2360
9	#27 Copeland Motorsports	Hyundai Veloster N TCR	15	13	4	14	14	**3**	7	**11**	4	3	2280
10	#51 Copeland Motorsports	Hyundai Veloster N TCR	5	6	10	12	4	14	13	7	13	10	2170
11	#84 Atlanta Speedwerks	Honda Civic Type R TCR (FK8)	**11**	**15**	11	**4**	1	6	10	10	7		2100
12	#19 Van Der Steur Racing	Hyundai Veloster N TCR	8	9	15	5	13	13	2	5	9	DNS	2030
13	#88 VGMC Racing LLC	Honda Civic Type R TCR (FK8)	16	11	13	13	11	9	12	12	12	14	1870
14	#81 CB Motorsports	Hyundai Veloster N TCR	14	14	9	8	8	12				16	1360
15	#15 Rockwell Autosport Development	Audi RS 3 LMS TCR	10				9				8	9	880
16	#73 LA Honda World Racing	Honda Civic Type R TCR (FK8)	17	2	8								690
17	#85 AOA Motorsports	Audi RS 3 LMS TCR	7									8	470
18	#44 New German Performance	Audi RS 3 LMS TCR									6	12	440
19	#89 TWOth Autosport / Bestline AutoTech	Audi RS 3 LMS TCR										13	180
Pos.	Team	Car	DAY	SEB	MOH	WGL1	WGL2	LIM	ELK	LGA	VIR	ATL	Points

=== Manufacturer's Championships ===
==== Standings: Grand Sport (GS) ====
Pos.	Manufacturer	DAY	SEB	MOH	WGL1	WGL2	LIM	ELK	LGA	VIR	ATL	Points
1	(Germany) Porsche	20	**2**	**2**	4	2	3	22	**1**	1	1	3030
2	(Germany) BMW	2	3	5	2	**1**	8	**1**	6	**3**	18	2960
3	(Germany) Mercedes-AMG	8	6	3	6	4	1	2	2	5	**6**	2850
4	(United Kingdom) McLaren	**1**	8	1	**3**	6	17	6	9	7	3	2800
5	(United Kingdom) Aston Martin	14	4	17	1	7	**2**	8	5	2	5	2790
6	(United States) Chevrolet	6	1	11	5	3	7	13	11	4	13	2690
7	(Germany) Audi	11	12	6	7	8	6	5	7	18	4	2540
8	(Japan) Toyota	7	20	9	20	9	5	17	8	16	2	2520
9	(United States) Ford	10	18	16	15	10		18	13	6	12	2100
Pos.	Manufacturer	DAY	SEB	MOH	WGL1	WGL2	LIM	ELK	LGA	VIR	ATL	Points

==== Standings: Touring Car (TCR) ====
Pos.	Manufacturer	DAY	SEB	MOH	WGL1	WGL2	LIM	ELK	LGA	VIR	ATL	Points
1	(South Korea) Hyundai	3	3	1	2	**3**	**1**	**2**	**1**	**2**	**3**	3210
2	(Germany) Audi	1	1	**6**	9	2	4	5	4	1	6	3150
3	(Japan) Honda	**2**	**2**	3	**1**	1	6	9	9	7	2	3140
4	(Italy) Alfa Romeo	12	4	7	7	7	2	1	13	10	1	3000
Pos.	Manufacturer	DAY	SEB	MOH	WGL1	WGL2	LIM	ELK	LGA	VIR	ATL	Points
