= 2025 IMSA Ford Mustang Challenge =

North American motor Racing Championship held in 2025

The 2025 IMSA Ford Mustang Challenge was the second season of the IMSA Ford Mustang Challenge. It began on March 12 at Sebring International Raceway and finished on October 5 at Charlotte Motor Speedway.

== Schedule ==
The Schedule was announced August 2, 2024, featuring 12 races over 6 double header events. In a change to the 2024 season, rounds at Sebring, Laguna Seca, Virginia International Raceway and the Charlotte Motor Speedway (Roval) were added, while rounds at Mid-Ohio and Watkins Glen were dropped.

In addition to the regular season races, the 2025 season also included an invitational round supporting the 2025 24 Hours of Le Mans.

Each weekend consisted of two 30-minute practice sessions, with a 15-minute qualifying session setting the grids for a pair of 45-minute races.

Round	Circuit	Location	Dates	Supporting
1	Sebring International Raceway	Sebring, Florida	March 12–14	IMSA SportsCar Championship
2	WeatherTech Raceway Laguna Seca	Monterey, California	May 9–11	IMSA SportsCar Championship
NC	Circuit de la Sarthe	Le Mans, France	June 12–14	24 Hours of Le Mans; Road to Le Mans
3	Road America	Elkhart Lake, Wisconsin	August 1–3	IMSA SportsCar Championship
4	Virginia International Raceway	Alton, Virginia	August 22–24	IMSA SportsCar Championship
5	Circuit of the Americas	Austin, Texas	September 5–7	FIA World Endurance Championship
6	Charlotte Motor Speedway	Concord, North Carolina	October 3–5	NASCAR Cup Series

== Entry list ==
Team	No.	Driver(s)	Class	Rounds
(United States) Spark Performance	1	(United States) Tanner Foust	DHS	3
(United States) Spark Performance	33	(United States) Alex Bachoura	DHL	1, 3
(United States) Robert Noaker Racing	7	(United States) Sandy Satullo	DH	1, 3
(United States) Robert Noaker Racing	13	(United States) Robert Noaker	DH	1, 3
(United States) Robert Noaker Racing	63	(United States) Joseph Dederichs	DHL	1, 3
(United States) Competition Motors	8	(United States) Tom Tait	DHL	1, 3
(United States) Competition Motors	17	(United States) Jim Farley	DHS	3
(United States) Competition Motors	27	(United States) Tom McGlynn	DHL	3
(Australia) Ryan McLeod Racing Cars	9	(Australia) Hadrian Morrall	DHL	3
(Australia) Ryan McLeod Racing Cars	92	(Australia) Cameron McLeod	DH	3
(Australia) Ryan McLeod Racing Cars	191	(Papua New Guinea) Keith Kassulke	DHL	3
(United States) NV Autosport	10	(United States) Stephen Vajda	DHL	1, 3
(United States) NV Autosport	79	(United States) Drew Neubauer	DHL	1, 3
(United States) MotorCity Dark Horse Racing	11	(United States) Josh Hansen	DH	3
(United States) TechSport Racing	15	(Puerto Rico) Alfonso Diaz	DHL	1, 3
(United States) TechSport Racing	21	(United States) Colin Harrison	DH	1, 3
(United States) TechSport Racing	22	(United States) Devin Anderson	DH	1
(United States) TechSport Racing	133	(United States) Frankie Muniz	DHS	3
(United Kingdom) Academy Motorsport	16	(United States) Steve Denton	DHL	3
(United Kingdom) Academy Motorsport	29	(United States) Erik Evans	DH	3
(United Kingdom) Academy Motorsport	62	(United Kingdom) Matt Nicoll-Jones	DH	3
(United Kingdom) Academy Motorsport	77	(United Kingdom) Chris Harris	DHS	3
(United Kingdom) Academy Motorsport	77	(United Kingdom) Chris Hoy	DHS	3
(United Kingdom) Academy Motorsport	97	(Canada) Marco Signoretti	DH	3
(United States) McCumbee McAleer Racing	18	(Puerto Rico) Marcos Vento	DH	1
(United States) McCumbee McAleer Racing	48	(United States) Zachry Lee	DHL	1
(Belgium) TeamFloral-Vanspringel	23	(United States) Jenson Altzman	DH	3
(Belgium) TeamFloral-Vanspringel	95	(Belgium) Nathan Vanspringel	DH	3
(United States) Paley Motorsport	26	(United States) Sam Paley	DH	3
(United States) LAP Motorsports	30	(United States) Scott Thomson	DHL	1, 3
(United States) LAP Motorsports	37	(United States) Cristian Perocarpi	DHL	1, 3
(United States) Automatic Racing	34	(United States) Will Lucas	DH	3
(United States) Automatic Racing	98	(United States) Tate Pritt	DHL 1 DH 3	1, 3
(Australia) Miedecke Motorsport Group with Team Anzac	35	(Australia) Andrew Miedecke	DHL	3
(Australia) Wall Racing	38	(Australia) David Wall	DH	3
(Australia) Wall Racing	47	(New Zealand) Tim Miles	DHL	3
(United States) Nick Smither Racing	58	(United States) Nicholas Smither	DHL	1, 3
(United States) Creative Auto Sport	68	(United States) Chip Van Vurst	DHL	1, 3
(United States) Creative Auto Sport	88	(United States) Chelsea DeNofa	DHL 1 DHS 3	1, 3
(United Kingdom) TechTrak	72	(United Kingdom) Adam Balon	DHL	3
(United States) Torre Racing	84	(United States) Paolo Salvatore	DHL	1
(United States) Peterson Racing	87	(United States) Douglas Peterson	DH	3
(New Zealand) Keltic Racing	101	(United Kingdom) Tony Quinn	DHL	3

Icon	Class
DH	Dark Horse
DHL	Dark Horse Legends
DHS	Dark Horse Stars

== Race results ==
Bold indicates overall winner.

Round		Circuit	Pole position	Fastest lap	Winning driver	Legends Winner	Stars Winner
1	R1	Sebring	(United States) #13 Robert Noaker Racing	(United States) #13 Robert Noaker Racing	(United States) #13 Robert Noaker Racing	(United States) #33 Spark Performance	No Entries
1	R1	Sebring	(United States) Robert Noaker	(United States) Robert Noaker	(United States) Robert Noaker	(United States) Alex Bachoura	No Entries
1	R2	Sebring	(United States) #13 Robert Noaker Racing	(United States) #13 Robert Noaker Racing	(United States) #13 Robert Noaker Racing	(United States) #33 Spark Performance	No Entries
1	R2	Sebring	(United States) Robert Noaker	(United States) Robert Noaker	(United States) Robert Noaker	(United States) Alex Bachoura	No Entries
2	R1	Laguna Seca	(United States) #13 Robert Noaker Racing	(United States) #13 Robert Noaker Racing	(United States) #13 Robert Noaker Racing	(United States) #33 Spark Performance	No Entries
2	R1	Laguna Seca	(United States) Robert Noaker	(United States) Robert Noaker	(United States) Robert Noaker	(United States) Alex Bachoura	No Entries
2	R2	Laguna Seca	(United States) #13 Robert Noaker Racing	(United States) #13 Robert Noaker Racing	(United States) #13 Robert Noaker Racing	(United States) #33 Spark Performance	No Entries
2	R2	Laguna Seca	(United States) Robert Noaker	(United States) Robert Noaker	(United States) Robert Noaker	(United States) Alex Bachoura	No Entries
NC	R1	Le Mans	(Australia) #92 Ryan McLeod Racing Cars	(Australia) #92 Ryan McLeod Racing Cars	(Australia) #92 Ryan McLeod Racing Cars	(United States) #33 Spark Performance	(United States) #88 Creative Auto Sport
NC	R1	Le Mans	(Australia) Cameron McLeod	(Australia) Cameron McLeod	(Australia) Cameron McLeod	(United States) Alex Bachoura	(United States) Chelsea DeNofa
NC	R2	Le Mans	(Australia) #92 Ryan McLeod Racing Cars	(United States) #13 Robert Noaker Racing	(Australia) #92 Ryan McLeod Racing Cars	(United States) #15 TechSport Racing	(United States) #1 Spark Performance
NC	R2	Le Mans	(Australia) Cameron McLeod	(United States) Robert Noaker	(Australia) Cameron McLeod	(Puerto Rico) Alfonso Diaz	(United States) Tanner Foust
3	R1	Road America	(United States) #13 Robert Noaker Racing	(United States) #13 Robert Noaker Racing	(United States) #13 Robert Noaker Racing	(United States) #33 Spark Performance	No Entries
3	R1	Road America	(United States) Robert Noaker	(United States) Robert Noaker	(United States) Robert Noaker	(United States) Alex Bachoura	No Entries
3	R2	Road America	(United States) #13 Robert Noaker Racing	(United States) #13 Robert Noaker Racing	(United States) #13 Robert Noaker Racing	(United States) #15 TechSport Racing	No Entries
3	R2	Road America	(United States) Robert Noaker	(United States) Robert Noaker	(United States) Robert Noaker	(Puerto Rico) Alfonso Diaz	No Entries
4	R1	VIR	(United States) #13 Robert Noaker Racing	(United States) #13 Robert Noaker Racing	(United States) #13 Robert Noaker Racing	(United States) #48 McCumbee McAleer Racing	No Entries
4	R1	VIR	(United States) Robert Noaker	(United States) Robert Noaker	(United States) Robert Noaker	(United States) Zachry Lee	No Entries
4	R2	VIR	(United States) #13 Robert Noaker Racing	(United States) #13 Robert Noaker Racing	(United States) #13 Robert Noaker Racing	(United States) #8 Competition Motors	No Entries
4	R2	VIR	(United States) Robert Noaker	(United States) Robert Noaker	(United States) Robert Noaker	(United States) Tom Tait	No Entries
5	R1	COTA	(United States) #13 Robert Noaker Racing	(United States) #13 Robert Noaker Racing	(United States) #13 Robert Noaker Racing	(United States) #15 TechSport Racing	No Entries
5	R1	COTA	(United States) Robert Noaker	(United States) Robert Noaker	(United States) Robert Noaker	(Puerto Rico) Alfonso Diaz	No Entries
5	R2	COTA	(United States) #13 Robert Noaker Racing	(United States) #13 Robert Noaker Racing	(United States) #13 Robert Noaker Racing	(United States) #48 McCumbee McAleer Racing	No Entries
5	R2	COTA	(United States) Robert Noaker	(United States) Robert Noaker	(United States) Robert Noaker	(United States) Zachry Lee	No Entries
6	R1	Charlotte	(United States) #13 Robert Noaker Racing	(United States) #13 Robert Noaker Racing	(United States) #13 Robert Noaker Racing	(United States) #33 Spark Performance	No Entries
6	R1	Charlotte	(United States) Robert Noaker	(United States) Robert Noaker	(United States) Robert Noaker	(United States) Alex Bachoura	No Entries
6	R2	Charlotte	(United States) #13 Robert Noaker Racing	(United States) #13 Robert Noaker Racing	(United States) #13 Robert Noaker Racing	(United States) #33 Spark Performance	No Entries
6	R2	Charlotte	(United States) Robert Noaker	(United States) Robert Noaker	(United States) Robert Noaker	(United States) Alex Bachoura	No Entries

== Championship standings ==
=== Points system ===
Championship points are awarded at the finish of each event according to the chart below. Ten bonus points each are awarded for the driver who earns the pole position and runs the fastest lap in each race event.

Position	1	2	3	4	5	6	7	8	9	10	11	12	13	14	15	16	17	18	19	20	21	22	23	24	25	26	27	28	29	30+
Points	350	320	300	280	260	250	240	230	220	210	200	190	180	170	160	150	140	130	120	110	100	90	80	70	60	50	40	30	20	10

=== Driver's Championship ===
IMSA recognizes driver champions based on the total number of championship points earned during the season.
