= 2024 IMSA Ford Mustang Challenge =

North American motor Racing Championship held in 2024

The 2024 IMSA Ford Mustang Challenge was the inaugural season of the IMSA Ford Mustang Challenge. It began on June 7 at Mid-Ohio Sports Car Course and ended on October 6 at Indianapolis Motor Speedway.

Robert Noaker Racing's Robert Noaker scored the series' inaugural victory during the opening round at Mid-Ohio.

== Calendar ==
An initial calendar was released in August 2023, featuring five race weekends totaling ten race events. The preliminary schedule initially featured a round at Charlotte Motor Speedway with an undisclosed date. Ultimately, this round was dropped from the final schedule in favor of the Indianapolis 8 Hour support race at Indianapolis Motor Speedway.

Each weekend consisted of two 30-minute practice sessions, with a 15-minute qualifying session setting the grids for a pair of 45-minute races.

Round	Circuit	Location	Dates	Supporting
1	Mid-Ohio Sports Car Course	Lexington, Ohio	June 7–9	TCR World Tour
2	Watkins Glen International	(New York (state)) Watkins Glen, New York	June 20–23	IMSA SportsCar Championship
3	Road America	Elkhart Lake, Wisconsin	August 2–4	IMSA SportsCar Championship
4	Circuit of the Americas	Austin, Texas	August 31–September 1	FIA World Endurance Championship
5	Indianapolis Motor Speedway	Speedway, Indiana	October 4–6	Intercontinental GT Challenge

== Entry list ==
Team	No.	Drivers	Class	Rounds
(Thailand) Amerasian Fragrance Competition Motorsports	1	(United States) Chloe Chambers	DH	1
(Thailand) Amerasian Fragrance Competition Motorsports	1	(Thailand) Carl Bennett	DH	2
(Thailand) Amerasian Fragrance Competition Motorsports	1	(United States) Greg Bennett	DHL	3
(United States) Leaders Credit Union Competition Motorsports	66	(Australia) Kel Kearns	DHL	All
(United States) Max Opalski Racing	2	(United States) Maximilian Opalski	DH	All
(United States) Spark Performance	3	(United States) Tommy McGlynn	DHL	3
(United States) Spark Performance	3	(United States) Frankie Muniz	DH	4
(United States) Spark Performance	3	(United States) Chloe Chambers	DH	5
(United States) Spark Performance	33	(United States) Alex Bachoura	DHL	All
(United States) KohR Motorsports	5	(United States) Rod Randall	DHL	All
(United States) KohR Motorsports	52	(United States) Christian Bach	DH	All
(United States) KohR Motorsports	94	(United States) D.J. Randall	DH	All
(United States) MDK Motorsports	8	(United States) Tom Tait	DHL	All
(United States) MDK Motorsports	16	(United States) Gabe Tesch	DH	1–3
(United States) MDK Motorsports	16	(United States) Trenton Estep	DH	4
(United States) MDK Motorsports	17	(Argentina) Jim Farley	DH	1
(United States) Automatic Racing	9	(United States) Mike Stillwagon	DHL	1
(United States) Automatic Racing	9	(United States) Rob Ecklin	DHL	3
(United States) Automatic Racing	99	(United States) Larry Webster	DH	1
(United States) NV Autosport	10	(United States) Stephen Vajda	DHL	1–2, 4–5
(United States) Robert Noaker Racing	13	(United States) Robert Noaker	DH	All
(United States) Robert Noaker Racing	29	(United States) Mitch Marvosh	DHL	1–4
(United States) Robert Noaker Racing	31	(United States) Reid Sweeney	DH	All
(United States) Robert Noaker Racing	74	(United States) Tyler Maxson	DH	All
(United States) Capaldi Racing	14	(United States) John Strauss	DHL	All
(United States) TechSport Racing	15	(United States) Alfonso Diaz	DHL	5
(Puerto Rico) JV Racing Team	18	(Puerto Rico) Marcos Vento	DH	All
(United States) Skip Barber Racing	19	(United States) Mike Stillwagon	DHL	2–5
(United States) McCumbee McAleer Racing	22	(United States) Jeremy Fletcher	DH	All
(United States) McCumbee McAleer Racing	48	(United States) Zachry Lee	DHL	All
(United States) McCumbee McAleer Racing	82	(United States) Nate Cicero	DH	1–2
(United States) McCumbee McAleer Racing	82	(United States) Drew Neubauer	DHL	4
(United States) Southern Paley Motorsports	26	(United States) Sam Paley	DH	All
(United States) LAP Motorsports	30	(United States) Scott Thomson	DHL	3–5
(United States) LAP Motorsports	37	(United States) Cristian Perocarpi	DH	5
(United States) Precision Performance Motorsports	46	(United States) Brandon Gdovic	DH	All
(United States) Precision Performance Motorsports	47	(United States) Wesley Slimp	DH	All
(United States) Nick Smither Racing	58	(United States) Nicholas Smither	DHL	All
(United States) Jack Lewis Enterprises	73	(United States) Jack Lewis	DHL	All
(United States) Torre Racing	84	(United States) Paolo Salvatore	DHL	3–4

Icon	Class
DH	Dark Horse
DHL	Dark Horse Legends

== Race results ==
Bold indicates overall winner.

Round		Circuit	Pole position	Fastest lap	Winning driver	Legends Winner
1	R1	Mid-Ohio	(United States) #74 Robert Noaker Racing	(United States) #74 Robert Noaker Racing	(United States) #13 Robert Noaker Racing	(United States) #8 MDK Motorsports
1	R1	Mid-Ohio	(United States) Tyler Maxson	(United States) Tyler Maxson	(United States) Robert Noaker	(United States) Tom Tait
1	R2	Mid-Ohio	(United States) #74 Robert Noaker Racing	(United States) #13 Robert Noaker Racing	(United States) #74 Robert Noaker Racing	(United States) #48 McCumbee McAleer Racing
1	R2	Mid-Ohio	(United States) Tyler Maxson	(United States) Robert Noaker	(United States) Tyler Maxson	(United States) Zachry Lee
2	R1	Watkins Glen	(United States) #13 Robert Noaker Racing	(United States) #74 Robert Noaker Racing	(United States) #74 Robert Noaker Racing	(United States) #48 McCumbee McAleer Racing
2	R1	Watkins Glen	(United States) Robert Noaker	(United States) Tyler Maxson	(United States) Tyler Maxson	(United States) Zachry Lee
2	R2	Watkins Glen	(United States) #74 Robert Noaker Racing	(United States) #74 Robert Noaker Racing	(United States) #74 Robert Noaker Racing	(United States) #48 McCumbee McAleer Racing
2	R2	Watkins Glen	(United States) Tyler Maxson	(United States) Tyler Maxson	(United States) Tyler Maxson	(United States) Zachry Lee
3	R1	Road America	(United States) #22 McCumbee McAleer Racing	(United States) #26 Southern Paley Motorsports	(United States) #26 Southern Paley Motorsports	(United States) #48 McCumbee McAleer Racing
3	R1	Road America	(United States) Jeremy Fletcher	(United States) Sam Paley	(United States) Sam Paley	(United States) Zachry Lee
3	R2	Road America	(United States) #26 Southern Paley Motorsports	(United States) #22 McCumbee McAleer Racing	(United States) #26 Southern Paley Motorsports	(United States) #48 McCumbee McAleer Racing
3	R2	Road America	(United States) Sam Paley	(United States) Jeremy Fletcher	(United States) Sam Paley	(United States) Zachry Lee
4	R1	COTA	(United States) #16 MDK Motorsports	(United States) #74 Robert Noaker Racing	(United States) #16 MDK Motorsports	(United States) #48 McCumbee McAleer Racing
4	R1	COTA	(United States) Trenton Estep	(United States) Tyler Maxson	(United States) Trenton Estep	(United States) Zachry Lee
4	R2	COTA	(United States) #16 MDK Motorsports	(United States) #22 McCumbee McAleer Racing	(United States) #13 Robert Noaker Racing	(United States) #48 McCumbee McAleer Racing
4	R2	COTA	(United States) Trenton Estep	(United States) Jeremy Fletcher	(United States) Robert Noaker	(United States) Zachry Lee
5	R1	Indianapolis	(United States) #13 Robert Noaker Racing	(United States) #13 Robert Noaker Racing	(United States) #74 Robert Noaker Racing	(United States) #33 Spark Performance
5	R1	Indianapolis	(United States) Robert Noaker	(United States) Robert Noaker	(United States) Tyler Maxson	(United States) Alex Bachoura
5	R2	Indianapolis	(United States) #13 Robert Noaker Racing	(United States) #74 Robert Noaker Racing	(United States) #13 Robert Noaker Racing	(United States) #15 TechSport Racing
5	R2	Indianapolis	(United States) Robert Noaker	(United States) Tyler Maxson	(United States) Robert Noaker	(United States) Alfonso Diaz

== Championship standings ==
=== Points system ===
Championship points are awarded at the finish of each event according to the chart below. Ten bonus points each are awarded for the driver who earns the pole position and runs the fastest lap in each race event.

Position	1	2	3	4	5	6	7	8	9	10	11	12	13	14	15	16	17	18	19	20	21	22	23	24	25	26	27	28	29	30+
Points	350	320	300	280	260	250	240	230	220	210	200	190	180	170	160	150	140	130	120	110	100	90	80	70	60	50	40	30	20	10

=== Driver's Championship ===
IMSA recognizes driver champions based on the total number of championship points earned during the season.

Pos.	Driver	MOH		WGI		ELK		COT		IND		Bonus	Points
1	(United States) Robert Noaker	1	2	**2**	2	3	4	2	1	2	**1**	40	3270
2	(United States) Tyler Maxson	**7**	**1**	1	**1**	2	3	3	8	1	2	80	3190
3	(United States) Sam Paley	2	4	5	4	1	**1**	21	24	5	5	20	2550
4	(United States) Jeremy Fletcher	3	3	3	22	**25**†	5	4	2	6	3	30	2490
5	(United States) Reid Sweeney	4	24	4	3	4	19	5	4	3	14	0	2360
6	(United States) Maximilian Opalski	6	27	22	5	6	6	6	5	4	4	0	2230
7	(Puerto Rico) Marcos Vento	9	21	11	10	9	8	8	6	7	6	0	2180
8	(United States) Alex Bachoura	26	9	17	8	10	11	11	10	10	12	0	1880
9	(United States) Mike Stillwagon	15	12	16	12	13	10	13	12	13	13	0	1840
10	(United States) Zachry Lee	23	8	7	6	7	9	9	7	DNS	DNS	0	1740
11	(United States) Nicholas Smither	17	10	12	14	15	14	15	17	15	17	0	1660
12	(United States) Brandon Gdovic	24	6	6	21	5	2	7	22	DNS	DNS	0	1600
13	(United States) Christian Bach	13	19	24	DNS	14	12	26	11	8	7	0	1470
14	(United States) D.J. Randall	10	5	9	9	23	DNS	10	9	DNS	DNS	0	1430
15	(United States) Tom Tait	12	23	13	13	24	16	19	21	14	15	0	1430
16	(United States) Wesley Slimp	25	25	10	20	11	13	25	23	21	11	0	1300
17	(United States) John Strauss	20	18	20	16	19	21	18	16	20	18	0	1270
18	(United States) Gabe Tesch	11	22	8	7	8	7					0	1260
19	(United States) Stephen Vajda	18	13	14	11			14	25	16	16	0	1240
20	(Australia) Kel Kearns	22	16	21	19	17	18	20	18	18	21	0	1230
21	(United States) Rod Randall	19	14	18	18	20	DNS	23	15	DNS	DNS	0	930
22	(United States) Mitch Marvosh	16	15	25	DNS	16	20	22	20			0	860
23	(United States) Jack Lewis	21	17	19	17	DNS	DNS	24	DNS	19	20	0	830
24	(United States) Chloe Chambers	27	7							9	9	0	740
25	(United States) Scott Thomson					18	22	17	19	17	19	0	740
26	(United States) Trenton Estep							**1**	**3**			20	670
27	(United States) Paolo Salvatore					12	17	27	13			0	550
28	(United States) Alfonso Diaz									11	8	0	430
29	(United States) Nate Cicero	5	26	23	DNS							0	410
30	(United States) Cristian Perocarpi									12	10	0	400
31	(United States) Drew Neubauer							16	14			0	320
32	(Thailand) Carl Bennett			15	15							0	320
33	(United States) Tommy McGlynn					21	15					0	260
34	(United States) Frankie Muniz							12	DNS			0	190
35	(United States) Rob Ecklin					22	DNS					0	90
36	(United States) Greg Bennett					DNS	DNS					0	0
Drivers ineligible to score points
	(Argentina) Jim Farley	14	11										
	(United States) Larry Webster	8	20										
Pos.	Driver	MOH		WGI		ELK		COT		IND		Bonus	Points

Colour	Result
Gold	Winner
Silver	Second place
Bronze	Third place
Green	Points classification
Blue	Non-points classification
Blue	Non-classified finish (NC)
Purple	Retired, not classified (Ret)
Red	Did not qualify (DNQ)
Red	Did not pre-qualify (DNPQ)
Black	Disqualified (DSQ)
White	Did not start (DNS)
White	Withdrew (WD)
White	Race cancelled (C)
Blank	Did not practice (DNP)
Blank	Did not arrive (DNA)
Blank	Excluded (EX)

**Bold** - Pole position

Italics - Fastest lap

- †: Post-event penalty. Car moved to back of class.

=== Dark Horse Legends Driver's Championship ===
Pos.	Driver	MOH		WGI		ELK		COT		IND		Bonus	Points
1	(United States) Alex Bachoura	26	**9**	17	8	10	11	11	10	10	12	10	3030
2	(United States) Mike Stillwagon	15	12	16	12	13	10	13	12	13	13	20	2960
3	(United States) Zachry Lee	**23**	8	**7**	**6**	**7**	**9**	**9**	**7**			140	2800
4	(United States) Nicholas Smither	17	10	12	14	15	14	15	17	15	17	0	2690
5	(United States) Tom Tait	12	23	13	13	24	16	19	21	14	15	0	2510
6	(United States) John Strauss	20	18	20	16	19	21	18	16	20	18	0	2260
7	(Australia) Kel Kearns	22	16	21	19	17	18	20	18	18	21	0	2210
8	(United States) Stephen Vajda	18	13	14	11			14	25	16	16	0	2070
9	(United States) Mitch Marvosh	16	15	25	DNS	16	20	22	20			0	1610
10	(United States) Rod Randall	19	14	18	18	20	DNS	23	15	DNS	DNS	0	1610
11	(United States) Jack Lewis	21	17	19	17	DNS	DNS	24	DNS	19	20	0	1530
12	(United States) Scott Thomson					18	22	17	19	17	19	0	1350
13	(United States) Paolo Salvatore					12	17	27	13			0	990
14	(United States) Alfonso Diaz									11	**8**	20	690
15	(United States) Drew Neubauer							16	14			0	510
16	(United States) Tommy McGlynn					21	15					0	460
17	(United States) Rob Ecklin					22	DNS					0	190
18	(United States) Greg Bennett					DNS	DNS					0	0
Pos.	Driver	MOH		WGI		ELK		COT		IND		Bonus	Points

=== Team's Championship ===
Pos.	Driver	MOH		WGI		ELK		COT		IND		Bonus	Points
1	(United States) Robert Noaker Racing	**1**	**1**	**1**	**1**	2	3	2	1	1	**1**	120	3510
2	(United States) McCumbee McAleer Racing	3	3	3	6	**7**	5	4	2	6	3	30	3010
3	(United States) Southern Paley Motorsports	2	4	5	4	1	**1**	21	24	5	5	20	2860
4	(United States) Max Opalski Racing	6	27	22	5	6	6	6	5	4	4	0	2600
5	(United States) MDK Motorsports	11	22	8	7	8	7	**1**	**3**	14	15	20	2480
6	(United States) KohR Motorsports	10	5	9	9	14	12	10	9	8	7	0	2420
7	(Puerto Rico) JV Racing Team	9	21	11	10	9	8	8	6	7	6	0	2410
8	(United States) Precision Performance Motorsports	24	6	6	20	5	2	7	22	21	11	0	2260
9	(United States) Spark Performance	26	9	17	8	10	11	11	10	9	9	0	2230
10	(United States) Nick Smither Racing	17	10	12	14	15	14	15	17	15	17	0	2030
11	(United States) Capaldi Racing	20	18	20	16	19	21	18	16	20	18	0	1760
12	(United States) Leaders Credit Union Competition Motorsports	22	16	21	19	17	18	20	18	18	21	0	1730
13	(United States) Skip Barber Racing			16	12	13	10	13	12	13	13	0	1710
14	(United States) NV Autosport	18	13	14	11			14	25	16	16	0	1580
15	(United States) Jack Lewis Enterprises	21	17	19	17	DNS	DNS	24	DNS	19	20	0	1190
16	(United States) LAP Motorsports					18	22	17	19	12	10	0	1140
17	(Thailand) Amerasian Fragrance Competition Motorsports	27	7	15	15							0	800
18	(United States) Torre Racing					12	17	27	13			0	770
19	(United States) Automatic Racing	15	12			22	DNS					0	600
20	(United States) TechSport Racing									11	8	0	470
Pos.	Driver	MOH		WGI		ELK		COT		IND		Bonus	Points
