= Tyler Maxson =

American racing driver (born 2004)

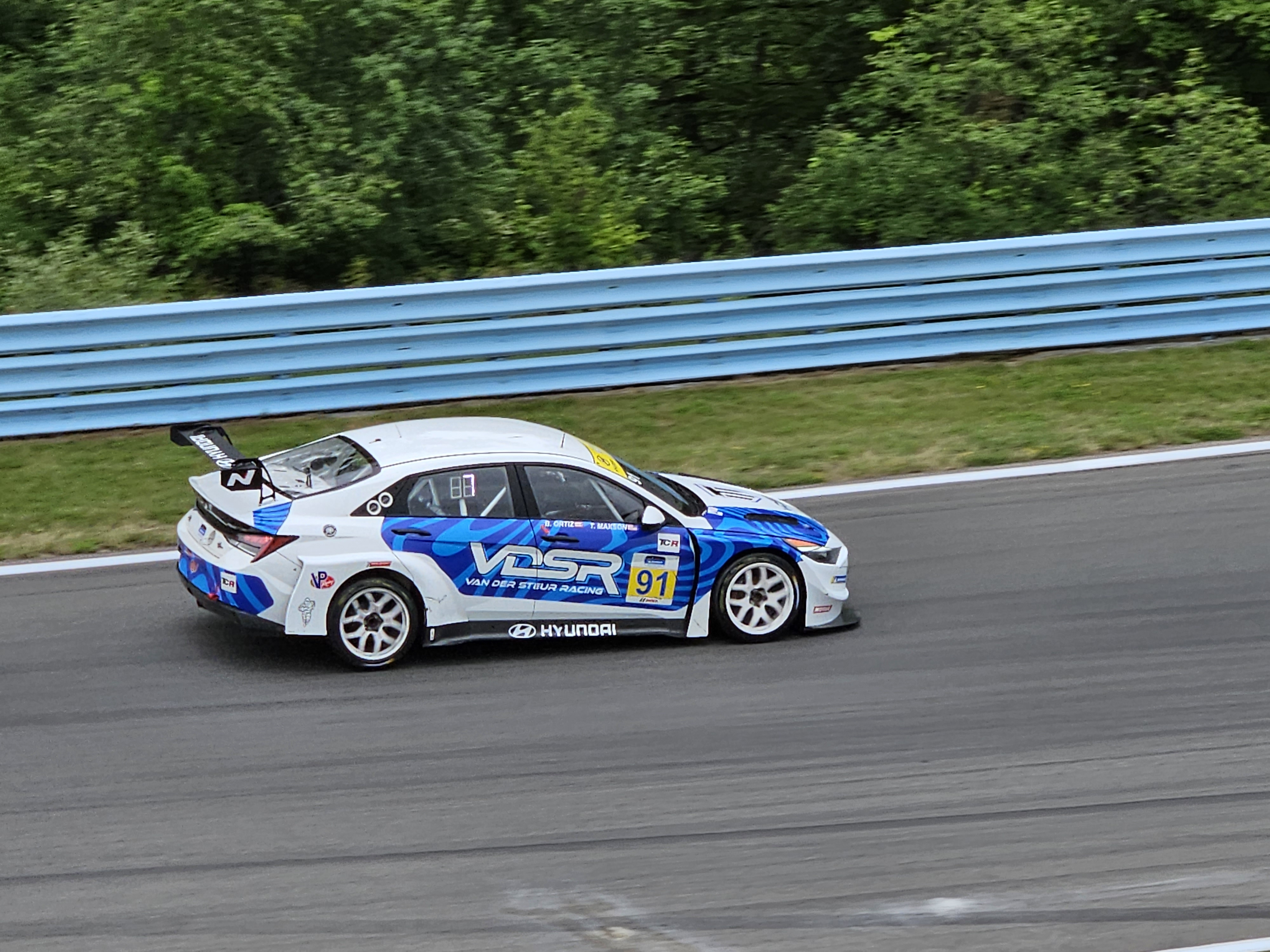
- Maxson's Hyundai Elantra N TCR at Watkins Glen in 2023.
- Nationality: (United States) American
- Born: October 12, 2004 (age 22) Lawrenceville, Georgia, United States

Porsche Carrera Cup North America career
- Debut season: 2025
- Current team: Topp Racing
- Categorisation: FIA Silver
- Car number: 77

Championship titles
- 2020 2019: TC America Series – TCR; TC America Series – TCA
- Statistics up to date as of January 3, 2026.

Tyler Maxson (born October 12, 2004) is an American racing driver.

Maxson was crowned champion in the TC America Series in consecutive seasons, becoming the youngest ever winner of the TCA class in 2019 before taking the TCR-class championship the following season.

== Career ==
=== Early career ===
Maxson was introduced to motorsports through his father, a local club racer who brought Tyler to the track to try karting at the age of six. Maxson was hooked on the experience, and began competing in local events shortly thereafter. Throughout his junior karting career, Maxson advanced rapidly through the ranks, claiming a National Mini Rok title before transitioning to cars in 2019 at just 14 years of age. During this time, Maxson remained a high school student, balancing online courses with his racing schedule.

Maxson's maiden season of pro racing involved a two-pronged effort in both the TC America Series and Global MX-5 Cup, where he piloted a new ND-spec Mazda MX-5 Cup car. Maxson had briefly competed in Spec Miata competition, but cited his primary motivation for competing in Mazda machinery as the marque's Road to 24 ladder, which provided winning drivers with scholarship funds and the chance to drive Mazda's prototype offerings. Maxson scored the TCA-class pole for his first pro race, and concluded the race with a podium finish. Later that season at Sonoma, he claimed his first class victory during the first race of the weekend, and would sweep the round with another race win on Sunday. With four podiums in the next six races, Maxson entered the season finale at Las Vegas Motor Speedway with a 22-point deficit to points leader Nick Wittmer. Wittmer would finish eighth in race one before retiring in race two, allowing Maxson's pair of third-place finishes to propel him to the TCA-class championship. With it, he became the youngest champion in class history, at just 15 years old. Maxson's MX-5 Cup campaign began surreptitiously, with top-ten finishes in each of the six races he competed in. However, he would not complete the 14-race season, leaving him 16th in the overall championship classification.

=== TCR and IMSA expansion ===
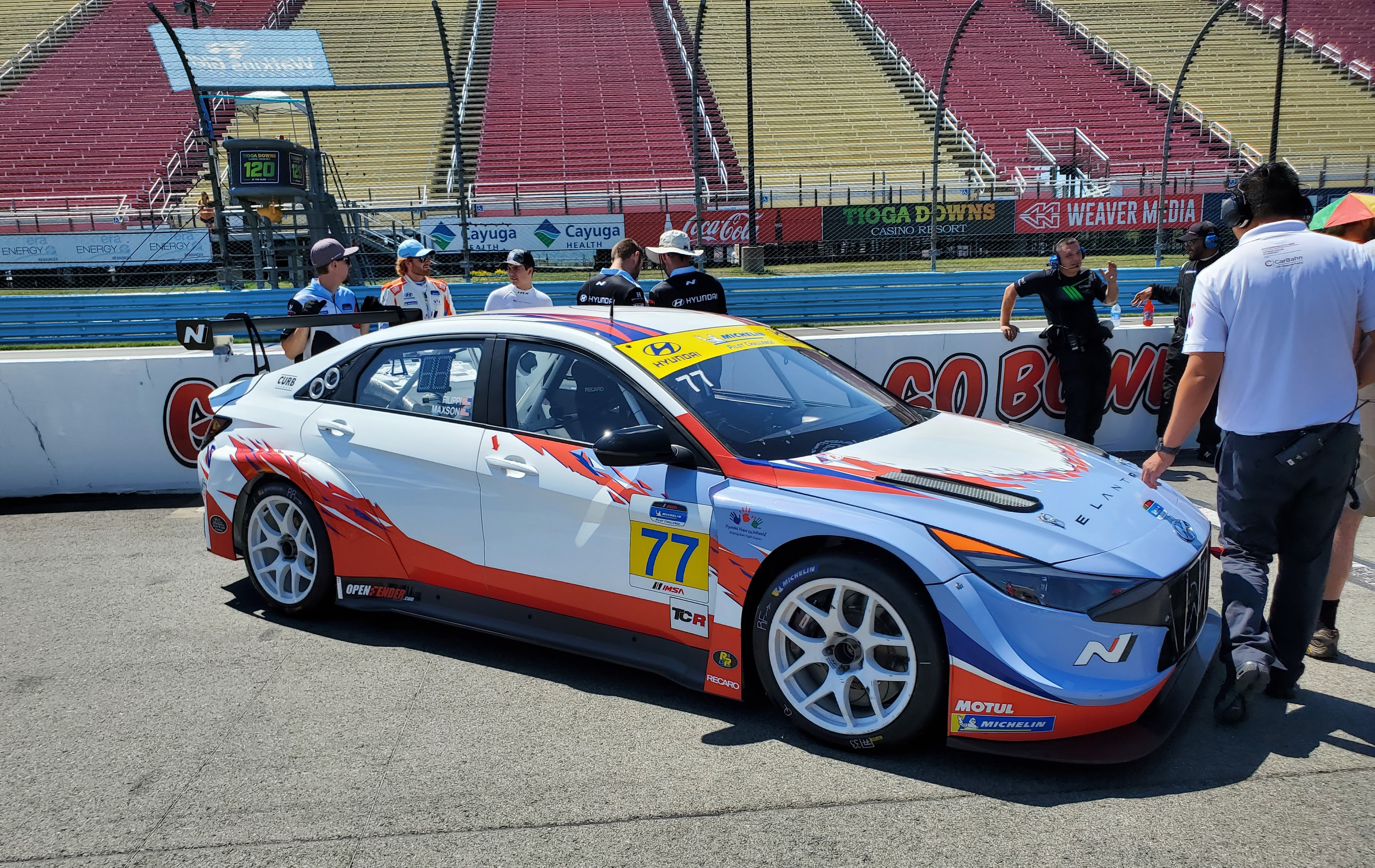
Maxson's Hyundai Elantra N TCR at Watkins Glen in 2022.

2020 saw Maxson jump from TCA to TCR machinery, once again with Copeland Motorsports. He enjoyed a rapid start to the campaign, sweeping each of the first three race weekends of the season and tallying nine consecutive victories before a mechanical failure at Road America ended his streak of race victories. Maxson would claim two more wins at Circuit of the Americas in September, taking the series championship by 67 points over second-placed Victor Gonzalez. Upon completion of his TC America program, Maxson took on a part-season drive in the Michelin Pilot Challenge, acting as a tune-up for a full season program in 2021. Paired with fellow 16-year-old Tyler Gonzalez, Maxson scored a second-place finish in his series debut at Road Atlanta.

The duo returned for a full-season program in 2021, with Maxson adopting the "T-Max" nickname in order to differentiate himself from Gonzalez. The duo claimed a class pole position at Lime Rock Park alongside a pair of podium finishes en route to a tenth-place championship finish. In a one-off drive for ST Racing in the GT4 America Series round at Road America, Maxson and Harry Gottsacker claimed a Silver Cup-class victory in the second race of the weekend.

2022 saw Maxson step up to the Hyundai factory-backed Bryan Herta Autosport operation, pairing with Mason Filippi as part of six-car entry by the team. He began the season on a high, claiming pole for the opening round at Daytona, which the duo followed up with additional poles at Sebring, Watkins Glen, and Canadian Tire Motorsport Park. However, they would have to wait until Lime Rock to score their first podium of the season, and would conclude the campaign eighth in the TCR championship. That year, Maxson made his debut in the IMSA SportsCar Championship, appearing for LMP3 team MLT Motorsports at the 6 Hours of Watkins Glen before finishing the season with Performance Tech Motorsports at Petit Le Mans.

Maxson's 2023 program surrounded a dual effort, continuing in the Michelin Pilot Challenge alongside a planned season-long GT4 America campaign. Continuing his Hyundai TCR efforts, Maxson joined customer racing outfit Deily Motorsports for the opening race of the season at Daytona before switching to Van der Steur Racing for the remainder of the year. He enjoyed a year of consistent finishes, claiming podiums at Watkins Glen and Road Atlanta en route to a fourth-place championship finish. Maxson reunited with Gonzalez and Copeland Motorsports for his GT4 exploits, and claimed a pole position at COTA before the team dropped off the entry list following the race weekend at VIR.

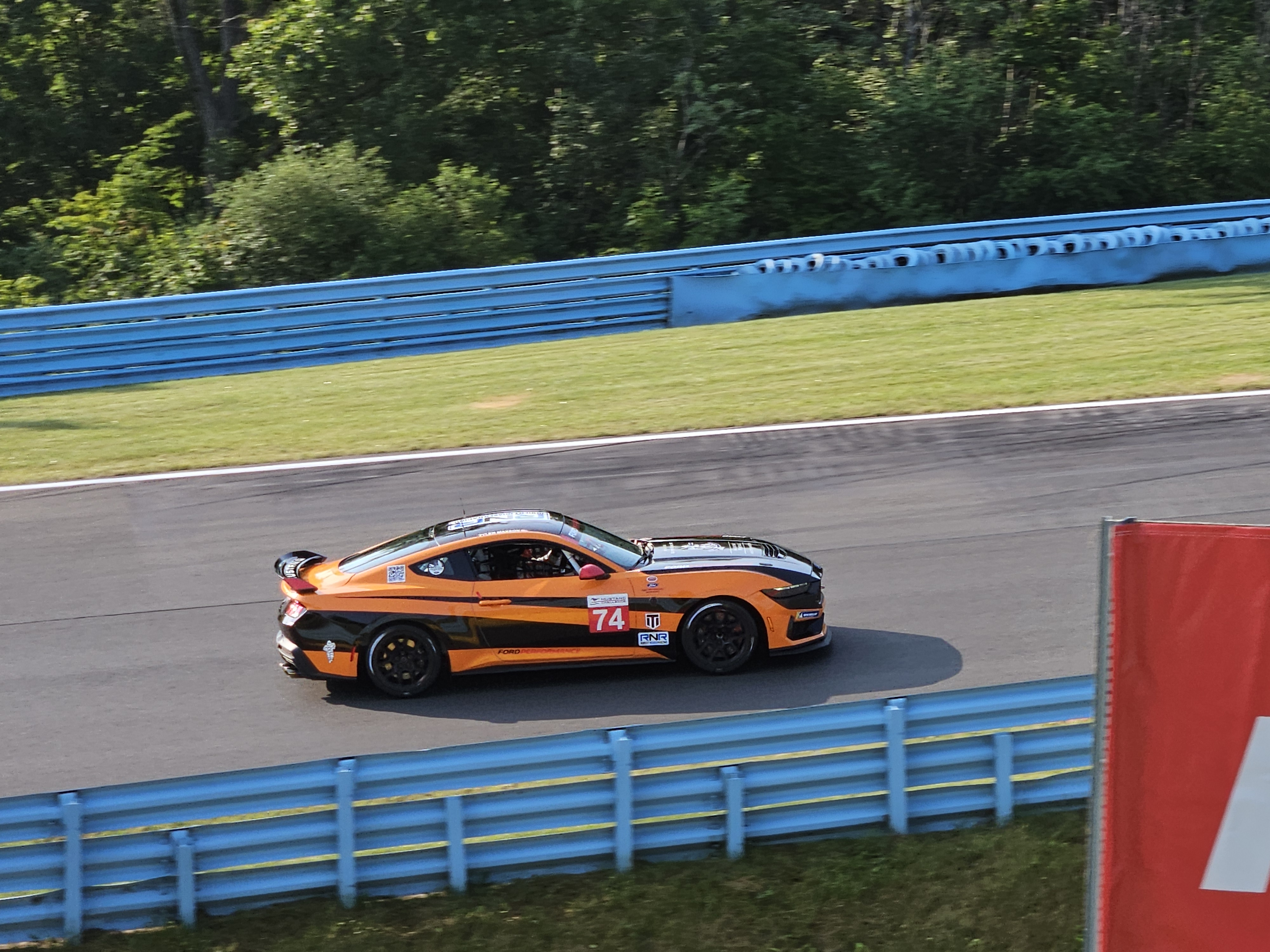
Maxson's Ford Mustang Dark Horse R at Watkins Glen in 2024.

The following year, Maxson embarked on a full-season effort in the new-for-2024 IMSA Ford Mustang Challenge, driving for fellow competitor Robert Noaker's family-owned operation. Despite the team taking delivery of the cars just over a week before the opening round at Mid-Ohio, Maxson claimed pole position for the inaugural race, and would take his first race victory in the series during the second race of the weekend. The following round at Watkins Glen saw Maxson sweep the weekend, re-taking the championship lead from Noaker. He registered three podiums in the following four races, but entered the finale weekend at a 70-point deficit to Noaker. Despite finishing first and second respectively during the pair of races at Indianapolis, Maxson fell 80 points short in the race for the title. Maxson also continued in the Michelin Pilot Challenge during 2024, albeit in a limited capacity. He drove for GS-class competitor TGR Team Hattori Motorsports at Daytona, paired with Toyota factory driver Jack Hawksworth.

For 2025, Maxson shifted his focus to the Porsche Carrera Cup North America, signing with Topp Racing for the season. He captured his maiden Carrera Cup podium during the second round of the season at Miami, before scoring his first pole at Road America in August. During race two at Road America, Maxson converted another pole position into his first race victory in the series. He would add another victory later that season at Road Atlanta, concluding the season fifth in the championship.

== Racing record ==
=== Career summary ===
Season	Series	Team	Races	Wins	Poles	F/Laps	Podiums	Points	Position
2019	TC America Series - TCA	Copeland Motorsports	14	2	3	2	10	206	**1st**
2019	Mazda MX-5 Cup	Copeland Motorsports	6	0	0	0	0	72	16th
2020	TC America Series - TCR	Copeland Motorsports	16	11	3	8	11	297	**1st**
2020	Michelin Pilot Challenge - TCR	Copeland Motorsports	2	0	0	0	1	53	17th
2021	Michelin Pilot Challenge - TCR	Copeland Motorsports	10	0	1	0	2	2280	10th
2021	GT4 America Series - Silver	ST Racing	2	1	0	0	1	29	11th
2021	IMSA Prototype Challenge - LMP3-1	Mühlner Motorsport America	1	0	0	0	0	180	30th
2022	Michelin Pilot Challenge - TCR	Bryan Herta Autosport with Curb-Agajanian	10	0	3	0	2	2340	8th
2022	IMSA SportsCar Championship - LMP3	MLT Motorsports	1	0	0	0	0	502	26th
2022	IMSA SportsCar Championship - LMP3	Performance Tech Motorsports	1	0	0	0	0	502	26th
2022	IMSA Prototype Challenge	MLT Motorsports	1	0	0	0	0	150	42nd
2022	24H Series - GT3 Pro-Am	ST Racing	1	0	0	0	0	?	?
2023	Michelin Pilot Challenge - TCR	van der Steur Racing	9	0	0	0	2	2630	4th
2023	Michelin Pilot Challenge - TCR	Deily Motorsports	1	0	0	0	0	2630	4th
2023	GT4 America Series - Silver	TGR Copeland Motorsports	7	0	1	0	1	63	9th
2024	IMSA Ford Mustang Challenge - Dark Horse	Robert Noaker Racing	10	4	3	5	8	3190	**2nd**
2024	Michelin Pilot Challenge - GS	TGR Team Hattori Motorsports	1	0	0	0	0	140	65th
2025	Porsche Carrera Cup North America	Topp Racing	16	2	2	1	4	208	5th
2026	Porsche Carrera Cup North America	Topp Racing	16	9	10	9	10	326	**1st**

^{*} Season still in progress.

=== Complete IMSA SportsCar Championship results ===
(key) (Races in bold indicate pole position)

Year	Team	Class	Make	Engine	1	2	3	4	5	6	7	Rank	Points
2022	MLT Motorsports	LMP3	Ligier JS P320	Nissan VK56DE 5.6 L V8	DAY	SEB	MOH	WGL; 7				26th	502
2022	Performance Tech Motorsports	LMP3	Ligier JS P320	Nissan VK56DE 5.6 L V8					MOS	ELK	PET; 8	26th	502

Sporting positions
Preceded by Series Founded	TC America Series; TCA Champion; 2019	Succeeded by Kevin Boehm
Preceded by Michael Hurczyn	TC America Series; TCR Champion; 2020	Succeeded by Class Folded
