= 2020 TC America Series =

Car racing series

The 2020 TC America Series was the second season of the TC America Series. The series consisted of 3 classes: TCR, TCA, and TC. All races were 40 minutes in length with 4 per weekend; 2 for TCR & TCA cars, and 2 for TC cars.

== Calendar ==
The final calendar was released on 12 November 2019 Due to the COVID-19 pandemic, SRO America announced that the events at Virginia International Raceway and Sonoma Raceway would become tripleheader weekends to replace cancelled race events at St. Petersburg and Lime Rock Park.

Round	Circuit	Date
1	(United States) Circuit of the Americas, Elroy, Texas	7–8 March
2	(United States) Virginia International Raceway, Alton, Virginia	9–12 July
3	(United States) Sonoma Raceway, Sonoma, California	7–9 August
4	(United States) Road America, Elkhart Lake, Wisconsin	29–30 August
5	(United States) Circuit of the Americas, Elroy, Texas	19–20 September
6	(United States) Indianapolis Motor Speedway, Speedway, Indiana	2–3 October

== Entry list ==
Team	Car	No.	Drivers	Rounds
TCR entries
(United States) DXDT Racing	Honda Civic Type R TCR (FK8)	04	(United States) CJ Moses	All
(United States) DXDT Racing	Honda Civic Type R TCR (FK8)	17	(United States) Scott Smithson	1–2, 4–6
(United States) DXDT Racing	Honda Civic Type R TCR (FK8)	29	(United States) Olivia Askew	2, 4–6
(United States) KMW Motorsports with TMR Engineering	Alfa Romeo Giulietta Veloce TCR	5	(Argentina) Roy Block	All
(United States) KMW Motorsports with TMR Engineering	Alfa Romeo Giulietta Veloce TCR	55	(United States) Tim Lewis Jr.	4, 6
(United States) Rumcastle, LLC	Volkswagen Golf GTI TCR (DSG)	16	(United States) Luke Rumburg	2
(Germany) New German Performance	Audi RS3 LMS TCR (DSG)	44	(United States) Tristan Herbert	2, 6
(United States) Copeland Motorsports	Hyundai Veloster N TCR	51	(United States) Nikko Reger	1
(United States) Copeland Motorsports	Hyundai Veloster N TCR	51	(United States) Alex Papadopulos	2
(United States) Copeland Motorsports	Hyundai Veloster N TCR	74	(United States) Tyler Maxson	All
(United States) FCP Euro	Volkswagen Golf GTI TCR	71	(United States) Michael Hurczyn	1
(United States) FCP Euro	Volkswagen Golf GTI TCR	72	(United States) Nate Vincent	1
(United States) LA Honda World Racing	Honda Civic Type R TCR (FK8)	77	(United States) Taylor Hagler	5
(Brazil) VVL Systems & Consulting	Audi RS3 LMS TCR (DSG)	88	(Brazil) Vinnie Lima	2, 6
(Puerto Rico) VGMC Racing	Honda Civic Type R TCR (FK8)	99	(Puerto Rico) Victor Gonzalez	All
TC entries
(Puerto Rico) VGMC Racing	Honda Civic Type-R TC	8	(Puerto Rico) Ruben Iglesias	All
(United States) Classic BMW	BMW M240i Racing Cup	11	(United States) Phil Bloom	1–3, 5–6
(United States) Classic BMW	BMW M240i Racing Cup	26	(United States) Toby Grahovec	All
(United States) Classic BMW	BMW M240i Racing Cup	27	(United States) John Rader	1
(United States) Classic BMW	BMW M240i Racing Cup	27	(United States) Bryson Lew	3–6
(United States) Auto Technic Racing	BMW M240i Racing Cup	20	(United States) Rob Slonaker	1–2, 4, 6
(United States) Auto Technic Racing	BMW M240i Racing Cup	20	(United States) John Castro Dubets	5
(United States) Auto Technic Racing	BMW M240i Racing Cup	21	(United States) Bruce Robson	1–2
(United States) Auto Technic Racing	BMW M240i Racing Cup	21	(United States) Austen Smith	4–5
(United States) Auto Technic Racing	BMW M240i Racing Cup	52	(United States) Tom Capizzi	1–2, 5–6
(United States) TechSport Racing	Nissan 370Z	23	(United States) Joseph Federl	1–4
(United States) Hard Motorsport	BMW M240i Racing Cup	30	(United States) Ace Robey	3
(United States) Hard Motorsport	BMW M240i Racing Cup	30	(United States) Vince Piemonte	5
(United States) Hard Motorsport	BMW M240i Racing Cup	31	(Denmark) Johan Schwartz	All
(United States) Hard Motorsport	BMW M240i Racing Cup	81	(United States) Steve Stremier	2
(United States) BimmerWorld Racing	BMW M240i Racing Cup	36	(United States) James Clay	All
(United States) BimmerWorld Racing	BMW M240i Racing Cup	94	(United States) Chandler Hull	All
(United States) LA Honda World Racing	Honda Civic Type-R TC	37	(United States) Mike LaMarra	5
(United States) LA Honda World Racing	Honda Civic Type-R TC	73	(United States) Mathew Pombo	5–6
(United States) FTG Racing	Mazda3 TC	70	(United States) Joey Jordan	3–6
(United States) GenRacer/Ricca Autosport	Hyundai Veloster N TC	78	(United States) Jeff Ricca	1, 5
(United States) Lone Star Racing	BMW M235i Racing Cup	48	(United States) Zane Hodgen	1
(United States) Team HMA	Honda Civic Type-R TC	93	(United States) Karl Hertel	1
(United States) Tazio Ottis Racing	Honda Civic Type-R TC	072	(United States) Tazio Ottis	3
TCA entries
(United States) Ives Motorsports	Mazda Global MX-5 Cup ND.2	07	(Puerto Rico) Jose DaSilva	1
(United States) Boehm Racing	Honda Civic Si	9	(United States) Kevin Boehm	All
(United States) MTP Motorsports	Hyundai Veloster Turbo	14	(United States) Max Peichel	6
(United States) CB Motorsports	Hyundai Veloster Turbo	18	(United States) Caleb Bacon	All
(United States) CB Motorsports	Hyundai Veloster Turbo	33	(United States) Matt Forbush	1–2, 4
(United States) TechSport Racing	Subaru BRZ tS	22	(United States) Joey Essma	1–2
(United States) TechSport Racing	Subaru BRZ tS	22	(United States) Kevin Anderson	5
(United States) TechSport Racing	Subaru BRZ tS	22	(United States) Eric Powell	6
(United States) TechSport Racing	Subaru BRZ tS	24	(Canada) Damon Surzyshyn	All
(United States) TechSport Racing	Subaru BRZ tS	25	(Canada) PJ Groenke	1–2, 4, 6
(United States) TechSport Racing	Subaru BRZ tS	28	(United States) Ben Bettenhausen	2, 5
(United States) TechSport Racing	Subaru BRZ tS	28	(United States) Kevin Anderson	6
(United States) Copeland Motorsports	Hyundai Veloster Turbo	50	(United States) Luke Lange	2–3
(United States) Copeland Motorsports	Hyundai Veloster Turbo	57	(United States) Tyler Gonzalez	All
(Puerto Rico) VGMC Racing	Honda Civic Si	59	(Guatemala) Juan Diego Hernandez	1
(Puerto Rico) VGMC Racing	Honda Civic Si	178	(United States) Jonathan Newcombe	All^{STP}
(United Kingdom) MINI JCW Team	MINI Cooper JCW	60	(United States) Tomas Mejia	All
(United Kingdom) MINI JCW Team	MINI Cooper JCW	61	(United States) Mark Pombo	All
(United Kingdom) MINI JCW Team	MINI Cooper JCW	62	(United States) Clay Williams	3–4
(United Kingdom) MINI JCW Team	MINI Cooper JCW	63	(United States) Derek Jones	4
(United States) CCR Team TFB	Honda Civic Si	186	(United States) Roy Fulmer IV	2–5

Note: A car marked with ^{STP} is entered only for the St. Petersburg makeup races at Sonoma.

== Race results ==
Bold indicates overall winner.

Round		Circuit	Pole position	TCR Winners	TC Winners	TCA Winners
1	R1	(United States) Austin	(United States) No. 51 Copeland Motorsports	(United States) No. 74 Copeland Motorsports	(United States) No. 36 BimmerWorld Racing	(United Kingdom) No. 61 MINI JCW Team
1	R1	(United States) Austin	(United States) Nikko Reger	(United States) Tyler Maxson	(United States) James Clay	(United States) Mark Pombo
1	R2	(United States) Austin		(United States) No. 74 Copeland Motorsports	(United States) No. 23 TechSport Racing	(United Kingdom) No. 60 MINI JCW Team
1	R2	(United States) Austin		(United States) Tyler Maxson	(United States) Joseph Federl	(United States) Tomas Mejia
2	R1	(United States) Virginia	(United States) No. 74 Copeland Motorsports	(United States) No. 74 Copeland Motorsports	(United States) No. 31 Hard Motorsport	(United Kingdom) No. 60 MINI JCW Team
2	R1	(United States) Virginia	(United States) Tyler Maxson	(United States) Tyler Maxson	(Denmark) Johan Schwartz	(United States) Tomas Mejia
2	R2	(United States) Virginia		(United States) No. 74 Copeland Motorsports	(United States) No. 31 Hard Motorsport	(United Kingdom) No. 61 MINI JCW Team
2	R2	(United States) Virginia		(United States) Tyler Maxson	(Denmark) Johan Schwartz	(United States) Mark Pombo
2	R3	(United States) Virginia		(United States) No. 74 Copeland Motorsports	(United States) No. 26 Classic BMW	(United States) No. 57 Copeland Motorsports
2	R3	(United States) Virginia		(United States) Tyler Maxson	(United States) Toby Grahovec	(United States) Tyler Gonzalez
3	R1	(United States) Sonoma	(Puerto Rico) No. 99 VGMC Racing	(United States) No. 74 Copeland Motorsports	(United States) No. 36 BimmerWorld Racing	(United States) No. 57 Copeland Motorsports
3	R1	(United States) Sonoma	(Puerto Rico) Victor Gonzalez	(United States) Tyler Maxson	(United States) James Clay	(United States) Tyler Gonzalez
3	R2	(United States) Sonoma		(United States) No. 74 Copeland Motorsports	(United States) No. 31 Hard Motorsport	(United Kingdom) No. 61 MINI JCW Team
3	R2	(United States) Sonoma		(United States) Tyler Maxson	(Denmark) Johan Schwartz	(United States) Mark Pombo
3	R3	(United States) Sonoma		(United States) No. 74 Copeland Motorsports	did not participate	(United States) No. 57 Copeland Motorsports
3	R3	(United States) Sonoma		(United States) Tyler Maxson	did not participate	(United States) Tyler Gonzalez
4	R1	(United States) Road America	(United States) No. 74 Copeland Motorsports	(United States) No. 74 Copeland Motorsports	(United States) No. 36 BimmerWorld Racing	(United States) No. 9 Boehm Racing
4	R1	(United States) Road America	(United States) Tyler Maxson	(United States) Tyler Maxson	(United States) James Clay	(United States) Kevin Boehm
4	R2	(United States) Road America		(United States) No. 17 DXDT Racing	(United States) No. 36 BimmerWorld Racing	(United States) No. 9 Boehm Racing
4	R2	(United States) Road America		(United States) Scott Smithson	(United States) James Clay	(United States) Kevin Boehm
4	R3	(United States) Road America		(United States) No. 17 DXDT Racing	(United States) No. 26 Classic BMW	(United States) No. 9 Boehm Racing (Note: Tyler Gonzalez in the #57 Copeland Motorsports entry took the checkered flag first, but was disqualified for a technical infringement)
4	R3	(United States) Road America		(United States) Scott Smithson	(United States) Toby Grahovec	(United States) Kevin Boehm
5	R1	(United States) Austin	(United States) No. 74 Copeland Motorsports	(United States) No. 74 Copeland Motorsports	(United States) No. 26 Classic BMW	(United States) No. 9 Boehm Racing
5	R1	(United States) Austin	(United States) Tyler Maxson	(United States) Tyler Maxson	(United States) Toby Grahovec	(United States) Kevin Boehm
5	R2	(United States) Austin		(United States) No. 74 Copeland Motorsports	(United States) No. 20 Auto Technic Racing	(United States) No. 9 Boehm Racing
5	R2	(United States) Austin		(United States) Tyler Maxson	(United States) John Castro Dubets	(United States) Kevin Boehm
5	R3	(United States) Austin		(United States) 17 DXDT Racing	did not participate	(United Kingdom) No. 62 MINI JCW Team
5	R3	(United States) Austin		(United States) Scott Smithson	did not participate	(United States) Matt Pombo
6	R1	(United States) Indianapolis	(United States) No. 17 DXDT Racing	(Germany) No. 44 New German Performance	(United States) No. 73 LA Honda World Racing	(United States) No. 9 Boehm Racing
6	R1	(United States) Indianapolis	(United States) Scott Smithson	(United States) Tristan Herbert	(United States) Mathew Pombo	(United States) Kevin Boehm
6	R2	(United States) Indianapolis		(Puerto Rico) No. 99 VCMG Racing	(United States) No. 73 LA Honda World Racing	(United States) No. 22 TechSport Racing
6	R2	(United States) Indianapolis		(Puerto Rico) Victor Gonzalez	(United States) Mathew Pombo	(United States) Eric Powell

== Championship standings ==
Scoring system

Championship points are awarded for the first ten position in each race. Entries are required to complete 75% of the winning car's race distance in order to be classified and earn points.

Position	**1st**	**2nd**	**3rd**	**4th**	**5th**	**6th**	**7th**	**8th**	**9th**	**10th**
Points	25	18	15	12	10	8	6	4	2	1

=== Driver's championships ===
Pos.	Driver	Team	AUS1 (United States)		VIR (United States)			SON (United States)			ELK (United States)			AUS2 (United States)			IMS (United States)		Points
Pos.	Driver	Team	RD1	RD2	RD1	RD2	RD3	RD1	RD2	RD3	RD1	RD2	RD3	RD1	RD2	RD3	RD1	RD2	Points
TCR
1	(United States) Tyler Maxson	(United States) Copeland Motorsports	1	1	**1**	1	1	1	1	1	**1**	Ret	4	**1**	**1**	5	Ret	Ret	297
2	(Puerto Rico) Victor Gonzalez	(Puerto Rico) VGMC Racing	28	5	13	2	2	**2**	2	3	3	12	2	5	3	**3**	3	1	230
3	(United States) Scott Smithson	(United States) DXDT Racing	5	7	2	3	3				2	1	1	2	6	1	**Ret**		183
4	(Argentina) Roy Block	(United States) KMW Motorsports w/ TMR Engineering	Ret	6	7	4	4	3	21	2	13	21	3	3	2	2	Ret	3	182
5	(United States) CJ Moses	(United States) DXDT Racing	6	8	6	8	6	4	3	4	5	3	6	7	7	4	2	4	158
6	(United States) Olivia Askew	(United States) DXDT Racing			5	7	7				4	Ret	5	6	5	6	4	5	92
7	(United States) Tristan Herbert	(Germany) New German Performance			3	5											1	2	68
8	(United States) Nikko Reger	(United States) Copeland Motorsports	**2**	2															36
9	(United States) Nate Vincent	(United States) FCP Euro	3	3															30
10	(United States) Michael Hurczyn	(United States) FCP Euro	4	4															24
11	(United States) Taylor Hagler	(United States) LA Honda World Racing												4	4				24
12	(Brazil) Vinnie Lima	(Brazil) VVL Systems & Consulting			9	9											5	6	24
13	(United States) Luke Rumberg	(United States) Rumcastle, LLC			4	6													20
14	(United States) Tim Lewis Jr.	(United States) KMW Motorsports w/ TMR Engineering									Ret	2	Ret				Ret		18
15	(United States) Alex Papadopulos	(United States) Copeland Motorsports			Ret	19	5												11
TC
1	(United States) James Clay	(United States) BimmerWorld Racing	7	11	11	11	10	5	5		6	4	8	9	9				235
2	(United States) Toby Grahovec	(United States) Classic BMW	8	10	**10**	12	8	Ret	7		7	7	7	**8**	10				201
3	(Denmark) Johan Schwartz	(United States) Hard Motorsport	**9**	12	8	10	9	**6**	4		**8**	6	Ret	13	15				180
4	(United States) Chandler Hull	(United States) BimmerWorld Racing	10	13	12	30	12	9	8		9	5	Ret	14	13				109
5	(United States) Tom Capizzi	(United States) Auto Technic Racing	12	14	14	15	14	8	9		10	10	10	Ret	17				89
6	(United States) Joseph Federl	(United States) TechSport Racing	Ret	9	16	14	13	10	11		22	DNS	DNS						63
7	(United States) Phil Bloom	(United States) Classic BMW	16	15	15	13	11	Ret	DNS					11	11				63
8	(United States) Rob Slonaker	(United States) Auto Technic Racing	14	17	17	16	15	11	10		12	9	11						56
9	(United States) Bryson Lew	(United States) Classic BMW						7	6		11	8	Ret	26	14				54
10	(United States) Austen Smith	(United States) Auto Technic Racing									14	11	9	12	12				43
11	(United States) John Castro Dubets	(United States) Auto Technic Racing												10	**8**				40
12	(United States) Jeff Ricca	(United States) GenRacer/Ricca Autosport	11	Ret										15	31				14
13	(United States) Zane Hodgen	(United States) Lone Star Racing	13	16															10
14	(United States) Joey Jordan	(United States) FTG Racing						Ret	Ret		DNS	23	18	Ret	30				9
15	(Puerto Rico) Ruben Inglesias	(Puerto Rico) VGMC Racing	19	20	30	31	28	13	12		Ret	16	Ret	18	20				8
16	(United States) Bruce Robson	(United States) Auto Technic Racing	15	18	Ret	18	16	Ret	DNS										7
17	(United States) Steve Stremier	(United States) Hard Motorsport			18	17													6
18	(United States) Tazio Ottis	(United States) Tazio Ottis Racing						12	Ret										4
19	(United States) Matthew Pombo	(United States) LA Honda World Racing												16	16				4
20	(United States) Ace Robey	(United States) Hard Motorsport						14	13										2
21	(United States) Vince Piemonte	(United States) Hard Motorsport												17	19				1
22	(United States) Mike LaMarra	(United States) LA Honda World Racing												25	18				0
23	(United States) Karl Hertel	(United States) Team HMA	17	31															0
24	(United States) John Rader	(United States) Classic BMW	18	19															0
TCA
1	(United States) Kevin Boehm	(United States) Boehm Racing	23	22	22	23	20	18	17	6	**15**	13	12	**19**	**21**	**10**			245
2	(United States) Tomas Mejia	(United Kingdom) MINI JCW Team	22	21	19	22	18	**17**	15	12	17	14	13	22	27	11			214
3	(United States) Tyler Gonzalez	(United States) Copeland Motorsports	20	27	21	21	17	15	16	5	Ret	Ret	DSQ	20	22	9			180
4	(United States) Mark Pombo	(United Kingdom) MINI JCW Team	**21**	25	**20**	20	19	16	14	11	Ret	22	17	23	29	8			177
5	(United States) Jonathan Newcombe	(Puerto Rico) VGMC Racing	27	32	28	28	23	20	19	8	23	15	14	24	23	Ret			98
6	(United States) Caleb Bacon	(United States) CB Motorsports	DSQ	28	24	Ret	30	21	20	9	19	17	Ret	21	26	12			87
7	(Canada) Damon Surzyshyn	(United States) TechSport Racing	Ret	Ret	Ret	Ret	25	23	Ret	10	20	18	15	Ret	24	13			60
8	(United States) Clay Williams	(United Kingdom) MINI JCW Team						19	18	7	Ret	20	16						51
9	(Canada) PJ Groenke	(United States) TechSport Racing	Ret	23	27	26	29				16	24	Ret						43
10	(United States) Joey Essma	(United States) TechSport Racing	Ret	24	23	25	27												30
11	(United States) Matt Forbush	(United States) CB Motorsports	25	30	29	27	26				21	19	Ret						28
12	(United States) Matt Pombo	(United Kingdom) MINI JCW Team														7			25
13	(United States) Roy Fulmer IV	(United States) CCR Team TFB			25	Ret	21	22	21										24
14	(United States) Luke Lange	(United States) Copeland Motorsports			26	24	22	Ret	DNS										22
15	(Guatemala) Juan Diego Hernandez	(Puerto Rico) VGMC Racing	24	26															18
16	(United States) Derek Jones	(United Kingdom) MINI JCW Team									18	DNS	DNS						12
17	(United States) Ben Bettenhausen	(United States) TechSport Racing			Ret	29	24							Ret	28	15			11
18	(Puerto Rico) Jose DaSilva	(United States) Ives Motorsports	26	28															8
19	(United States) Kevin Anderson	(United States) TechSport Racing												Ret	25	14			4
Pos.	Driver	Team	AUS1 (United States)		VIR (United States)			SON (United States)			ELK (United States)			AUS2 (United States)			IMS (United States)		Points

Key
Colour	Result
Gold	Race winner
Silver	2nd place
Bronze	3rd place
Green	Points finish
Blue	Non-points finish
Blue	Non-classified finish (NC)
Purple	Did not finish (Ret)
Black	Disqualified (DSQ)
Black	Excluded (EX)
White	Did not start (DNS)
White	Race cancelled (C)
White	Withdrew (WD)
Blank	Did not participate

**Bold** – Pole
Italics – Fastest Lap

=== Team's championships ===
Pos.	Team	Manufacturer	AUS1 (United States)		VIR (United States)			SON (United States)			ELK (United States)			AUS2 (United States)			IMS (United States)		Points
Pos.	Team	Manufacturer	RD1	RD2	RD1	RD2	RD3	RD1	RD2	RD3	RD1	RD2	RD3	RD1	RD2	RD3	RD1	RD2	Points
TCR
1	(United States) Copeland Motorsports	Hyundai	**1**	1	**1**	1	1	1	1	1									200
2	(Puerto Rico) VGMC Racing	Honda	28	5	13	2	2	**2**	2	3									120
3	(United States) DXDT Racing	Honda	5	7	2	3	3	4	3	4									112
4	(United States) KMW Motorsport w/ TMR Engineering	Alfa Romeo	Ret	6	7	4	4	3	21	2									91
5	(United States) FCP Euro	Volkswagen	3	3															36
6	(Germany) New German Performance	Audi			3	5													25
7	(United States) Rumcastle, LLC	Volkswagen			4	6													20
8	(Brazil) VVL Systems & Consulting	Audi			9	9													14
TC
1	(United States) Hard Motorsport	BMW	**9**	12	8	10	9	**6**	4										138
2	(United States) BimmerWorld Racing	BMW	7	11	11	11	10	5	5										131
3	(United States) Classic BMW	BMW	8	10	**10**	12	8	7	6										124
4	(United States) TechSport Racing	Nissan	Ret	9	16	14	13	10	11										79
5	(United States) Auto Technic Racing	BMW	12	14	14	15	14	8	9										76
6	(Puerto Rico) VGMC Racing	Honda	19	20	30	31	28	13	12										48
7	(United States) Lone Star Racing	BMW	13	16															16
8	(United States) GenRacer/Ricca Autosport	Hyundai	11	Ret															12
9	(United States) Team HMA	Honda	17	31															10
10	(United States) Tazio Ottis Racing	Honda						12	Ret										8
	(United States) FTG Racing	Mazda						Ret	Ret										0
TCA
1	(United Kingdom) MINI JCW Team	Mini	**21**	21	**19**	20	18	**16**	14	7									169
2	(United States) Copeland Motorsports	Hyundai	20	27	21	21	17	15	16	5									164
3	(United States) Boehm Racing	Honda	23	22	22	23	20	18	17	6									126
4	(Puerto Rico) VGMC Racing	Honda	24	26	28	28	23	20	19	8									84
5	(United States) CB Motorsports	Hyundai	25	28	24	27	26	21	20	9									74
6	(United States) TechSport Racing	Subaru	Ret	23	23	25	24	23	Ret	10									61
7	(United States) CCR Team TFB	Honda			25	Ret	21	22	21										20
8	(United States) Ives Motorsports	Mazda	26	28															14
Pos.	Team	Manufacturer	AUS1 (United States)		VIR (United States)			SON (United States)			ELK (United States)			AUS2 (United States)			IMS (United States)		Points
