= IMSA Ford Mustang Challenge =

American sports car racing series

- Category: One-make sports car racing
- Country: United States
- Inaugural season: 2024
- Constructors: Ford
- Tyre suppliers: Michelin
- Official website: Mustang Challenge

The IMSA Ford Mustang Challenge is a one-make sports car racing series held in the United States that features Ford Mustang Dark Horse R race cars. The series is sanctioned by the International Motor Sports Association.

== History ==
The unveiling of the seventh-generation Ford Mustang brought with it a slew of special editions and motorsport activations, including the introduction of the Dark Horse R track edition in July 2023. The car resembles the track day-focused Dark Horse S, but features unique wheels and a racing fuel cell on top of the FIA roll cage, tow hooks, upgraded brakes, rear wing, and re-designed exhaust system featured on the Dark Horse S. The Dark Horse R additionally features a six-speed manual gearbox and an anti-lock braking system, with a base price of approximately $150,000.

Alongside the car's announcement came the launch of a new spec racing series, dubbed the Mustang Challenge, which was initially set to support six IMSA race weekends in 2024. The series would be managed by the Ford Performance Racing School and officially sanctioned by IMSA. Entries would additionally race on bespoke Michelin tires, and top finishers would receive contingency payouts at each race event as well as at the conclusion of the season. The champion, for instance, received a cash prize of $40,000 or a $100,000 scholarship towards a seat in a Ford Mustang GT3 or GT4 entry. This allowed the series to operate as the first step of an internal ladder for Ford Performance's GT-racing efforts, in which drivers could begin competing in Mustang Challenge races before progressing to a GT3 seat through exceptional performance.

The 2024 calendar was officially announced in October 2023, featuring five race weekends totaling ten race events. The season began at Mid-Ohio Sports Car Course in June, before visiting Watkins Glen International and Road America in support of the IMSA SportsCar Championship later in the summer. The Mustang Challenge then joined the FIA World Endurance Championship at Circuit of the Americas and the Intercontinental GT Challenge at Indianapolis to conclude its inaugural season. The class structure was also finalized, featuring an at-large Dark Horse class alongside an optional Dark Horse Legends class for Bronze-rated drivers over the age of 45. The series' inaugural event at Mid-Ohio welcomed 26 entries, including Ford Motor Company CEO Jim Farley, who piloted the #17 entry for MDK Motorsports. Tyler Maxson scored the series' first ever pole position, while Robert Noaker won the series' inaugural race.

Following the series' inaugural round, an invitational round supporting the 2025 24 Hours of Le Mans was announced. A new class was also added to Japan's Super Taikyu Series for the Dark Horse X as well as the Chevrolet Corvette Z06 GT3.R in late 2025; the ST-USA class will primarily race at the Fuji 24 Hours.

== Circuits ==
- Mid-Ohio Sports Car Course (2024, 2026)
- (New York (state)) Watkins Glen International (2024, 2026)
- (Wisconsin) Road America (2024–2025)
- (Texas) Circuit of the Americas (2024–present)
- (Indiana) Indianapolis Motor Speedway (2024)
- (Florida) Sebring International Raceway (2025–present)
- (California) Laguna Seca (2025–present)
- (France) Circuit de La Sarthe (2025)
- Virginia International Raceway (2025–present)
- (North Carolina) Charlotte Motor Speedway (2025)
- (Florida) Daytona International Speedway (2027)
- (Belgium) Circuit de Spa-Francorchamps (2027)
- (Georgia (U.S. state)) Road Atlanta (2027)

== Champions ==
=== Drivers' ===
Year	Overall	Dark Horse Legends
2024	(United States) Robert Noaker	(United States) Alex Bachoura
2025	(United States) Robert Noaker	(United States) Alex Bachoura

=== Teams' ===
Year	Overall
2024	(United States) Robert Noaker Racing
2025	(United States) Robert Noaker Racing

== See also ==
- Ford Mustang Challenge Australia
- Ferrari Challenge
- Lamborghini Super Trofeo
- Mazda MX-5 Cup
- Porsche Carrera Cup
