= Sheena Monk =

American racing driver

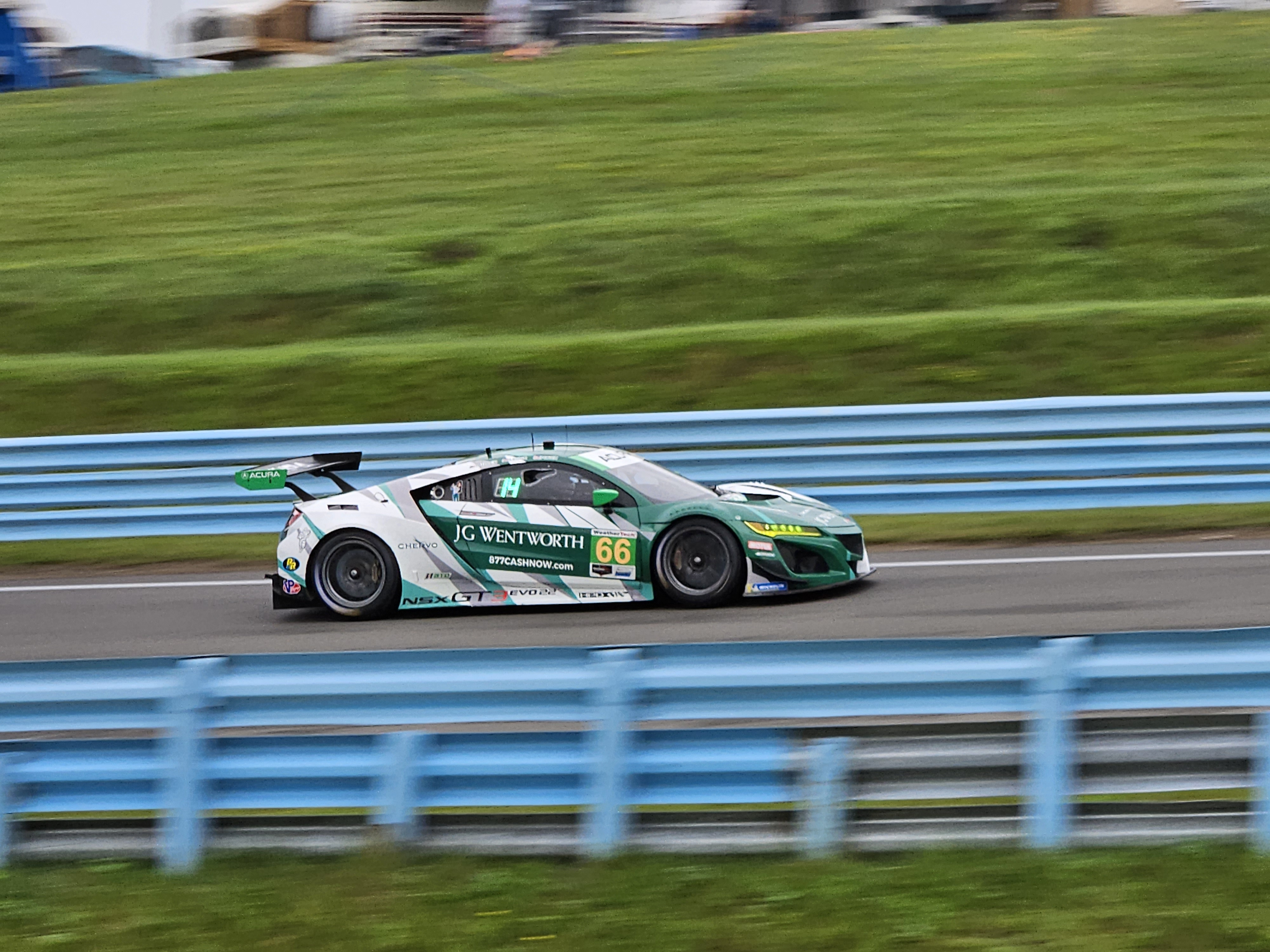
- Nationality: (United States) American
- Born: March 16, 1989 (age 37) Newtown, Pennsylvania, U.S.

IMSA SportsCar Championship career
- Debut season: 2023
- Categorisation: FIA Silver (until 2020); FIA Bronze (2021–)
- Car number: 021
- Former teams: Triarsi Competizione, Gradient Racing
- Starts: 14
- Wins: 0
- Podiums: 0
- Poles: 0
- Fastest laps: 1
- Best finish: 11th in 2023

Previous series
- 2020–22 2018–19: Michelin Pilot Challenge; Lamborghini Super Trofeo North America

Sheena Monk (born March 16, 1989) is an American racing driver. She currently competes in the No. 16 Myers Riley Motorsports Mustang GT3 for the 2026 IMSA SportsCar Championship. She has previously driven for Gradient Racing as well as Triarsi Competizione.

== Career ==
Monk began her racing career later than many of her peers, initially entering motorsport at 28 and without a traditional karting background.

=== Lamborghini Super Trofeo North America ===
For 2018, it was announced that Monk would compete in the 2018 Lamborghini Super Trofeo North America – LB Cup driving for Wayne Taylor Racing. She would finish fourth that season with one win, two poles, and seven podiums.

=== Michelin Pilot Challenge ===
==== 2020 ====
In 2020, Monk announced that she would be moving to the 2020 Michelin Pilot Challenge driving the No. 3 McLaren 570S GT4 for Motorsport in Action. She would partner with Corey Lewis for that season. Monk would get her first win at Road America. She and Lewis would finish the season ninth in the standings.

==== 2021 ====
Monk would return to the series for the 2021 season driving the No. 3 McLaren 570S GT4, with Spencer Pigot as her teammate. She and Pigot would finish sixth in the championship that season with only one podium from Watkins Glen.

==== 2022 ====
Monk returned to the series for the 2022 season. She drove for the newly-rebranded TGR Infinity Autosport and partnered with Kyle Marcelli driving the No. 3 Toyota GR Supra GT4. During the second round at Sebring International Raceway, Marcelli suffered a high-speed crash with competitor Mason Filippi's Hyundai Elantra N TCR. This crash resulted in damage beyond repair to Monk and Marcelli's car. As a result, both drivers switched teams to PF Racing for the rest of the season to drive their No. 877 Ford Mustang GT4. Monk would get two podiums at Lime Rock Park and Virginia International Raceway to finish sixth in the standings.

=== IMSA SportsCar Championship ===
==== 2023 ====
On January 3, 2023, it was announced that Monk would make her debut in the 2023 IMSA SportsCar Championship in the GTD class driving the No. 66 Gradient Racing Acura NSX GT3 Evo22. She would team up with Katherine Legge to form an all female lineup. Their best finish of the season came at the 2023 24 Hours of Daytona where they finished fourth in class. Monk and Legge would finish 11th in the championship by season's end.

==== 2024 ====
In 2024, it was announced that Monk would return to the series with Gradient Racing once again partnering with Legge.

==== 2025 ====
Monk would leave Gradient Racing at the end of 2024 and join Triarsi Competizione to drive their No. 021 Ferrari 296 GT3 for the 2025 season.

==== 2026 ====
Monk is competing in the 2026 IMSA SportsCar Championship in the GTD class for Myers Riley Motorsports. She competed at the Rolex 24 Hours of Daytona alongside Romain Grosjean, Felipe Fraga, and Jenson Altzman.

== Personal life ==
Monk was introduced to motorsport at a young age through her father, who raced motorcycles. She rode dirt bikes and drove go-karts recreationally but did not pursue competitive racing in her early years, choosing to focus on soccer at the time instead.

Monk was raised primarily by her mother, who was a single parent and worked multiple jobs at various points to support the family. Monk has cited this upbringing as influential in developing her work ethic and perseverance.

== Racing record ==
=== Career summary ===
Season	Series	Team	Races	Wins	Poles	F/Laps	Podiums	Points	Position
2018	Lamborghini Super Trofeo North America – LB Cup	Wayne Taylor Racing	8	1	2	2	7	87	4th
2019	Lamborghini Super Trofeo North America – AM	Dream Racing Motorsport	12	0	0	0	5	82	4th
2019	Lamborghini Super Trofeo World Finals	Dream Racing Motorsport	2	0	0	0	0	N/A	N/A
2020	Michelin Pilot Challenge – GS	Motorsport in Action	10	1	0	0	1	208	9th
2021	Michelin Pilot Challenge – GS	Motorsport in Action	10	0	0	0	1	2240	6th
2022	Michelin Pilot Challenge – GS	TGR Infinity Autosport	2	0	0	0	0	1970	6th
2022	Michelin Pilot Challenge – GS	PF Racing	8	0	0	0	2	1970	6th
2023	IMSA SportsCar Championship – GTD	Gradient Racing	11	0	0	1	0	2552	11th
2024	IMSA SportsCar Championship – GTD	Gradient Racing	3	0	0	0	0	603*	14th*
2025	IMSA SportsCar Championship – GTD	Triarsi Competizione	4	0	0	0	0	697	38th
2026	IMSA SportsCar Championship – GTD	Myers Riley Motorsports	10	0	0	0	0	2011	15th

* Season still in progress.

=== Complete Michelin Pilot Challenge results ===
(key) (Races in bold indicate pole position) (Races in italics indicate fastest lap)

Year	Entrant	Class	Make	Engine	1	2	3	4	5	6	7	8	9	10	Rank	Points
2020	Motorsport in Action	GS	McLaren 570S GT4	McLaren M838TE 3.8 L Turbo V8	DAY; 18	SEB; 1; 12	ELK; 1	VIR; 20	ATL; 1; 12	MOH; 1; 16	MOH; 2; 9	ATL; 2; 7	LGA; 9	SEB; 2; 4	9th	208
2021	Motorsport in Action	GS	McLaren 570S GT4	McLaren M838TE 3.8 L Turbo V8	DAY; 9	SEB; 8	MOH; 4	WGL; 1; 3	WGL; 2; 6	LIM; 21	ELK; 6	LGA; 9	VIR; 8	ATL; 15	6th	2240
2022	TGR Infinity Autosport	GS	Toyota GR Supra GT4	BMW B58B30 3.0 L Turbo I6	DAY; 12	SEB; 28									6th	2240
2022	PF Racing	GS	Ford Mustang GT4	Ford Voodoo 5.2 L V8			LGA; 24	MOH; 10	WGL; 12	MOS; 9	LIM; 3	ELK; 6	VIR; 2	ATL; 12	6th	2240

=== Complete IMSA SportsCar Championship results ===
(key) (Races in bold indicate pole position) (Races in italics indicate fastest lap)

Year	Entrant	Class	Make	Engine	1	2	3	4	5	6	7	8	9	10	11	Rank	Points
2023	Gradient Racing	GTD	Acura NSX GT3 Evo22	Acura JNC1 3.5 L Turbo V6	DAY; 4	SEB; 12	LBH; 9	LGA; 13	WGL; 5	MOS; 11	LIM; 6	ELK; 10	VIR; 10	IMS; 13	PET; 15	11th	2552
2024	Gradient Racing	GTD	Acura NSX GT3 Evo22	Acura JNC1 3.5 L Turbo V6	DAY; 19	SEB; 17	LBH; 4	LGA; 12	WGL; 13	MOS; 7	ELK; 3	VIR; 12	IMS; 16	PET; 12		12th	2175
2025	Triarsi Competizione	GTD	Ferrari 296 GT3	Ferrari F163CE 3.0 L Turbo V6	DAY; 22	SEB; 15	LBH; 14	LGA; 11	WGL	MOS	ELK	VIR	IMS	PET		38th	697
2026	Myers Riley Motorsports	GTD	Ford Mustang GT3	Ford Coyote 5.4 L V8	DAY; 19	SEB; 11	LBH; 7	LGA; 8	WGL; 14	MOS; 8	ELK; 19	VIR; 12	IMS; 9	PET; 15		15th	2011

^{*} Season still in progress.

==== 24 Hours of Daytona results ====
Year	Class	No	Team	Car	Co-drivers	Laps	Position	Class Pos.
2023	GTD	66	(United States) Gradient Racing	Acura NSX GT3 Evo22	(Germany) Mario Farnbacher (United Kingdom) Katherine Legge (United States) Marc Miller	729	22nd	4th
2024	GTD	66	(United States) Gradient Racing	Acura NSX GT3 Evo22	(Colombia) Tatiana Calderón (United Kingdom) Katherine Legge (United Kingdom) Stevan McAleer	368	DNF	DNF
2025	GTD	021	(United States) Triarsi Competizione	Ferrari 296 GT3	(United Kingdom) James Calado (United Kingdom) Stevan McAleer (United States) Mike Skeen	688	DNF	DNF
2026	GTD	16	(United States) Myers Riley Motorsports	Ford Mustang GT3 Evo	(United States) Jenson Altzman (Brazil) Felipe Fraga (France) Romain Grosjean	115	DNF	DNF
