= Taylor Hagler =

American racing driver

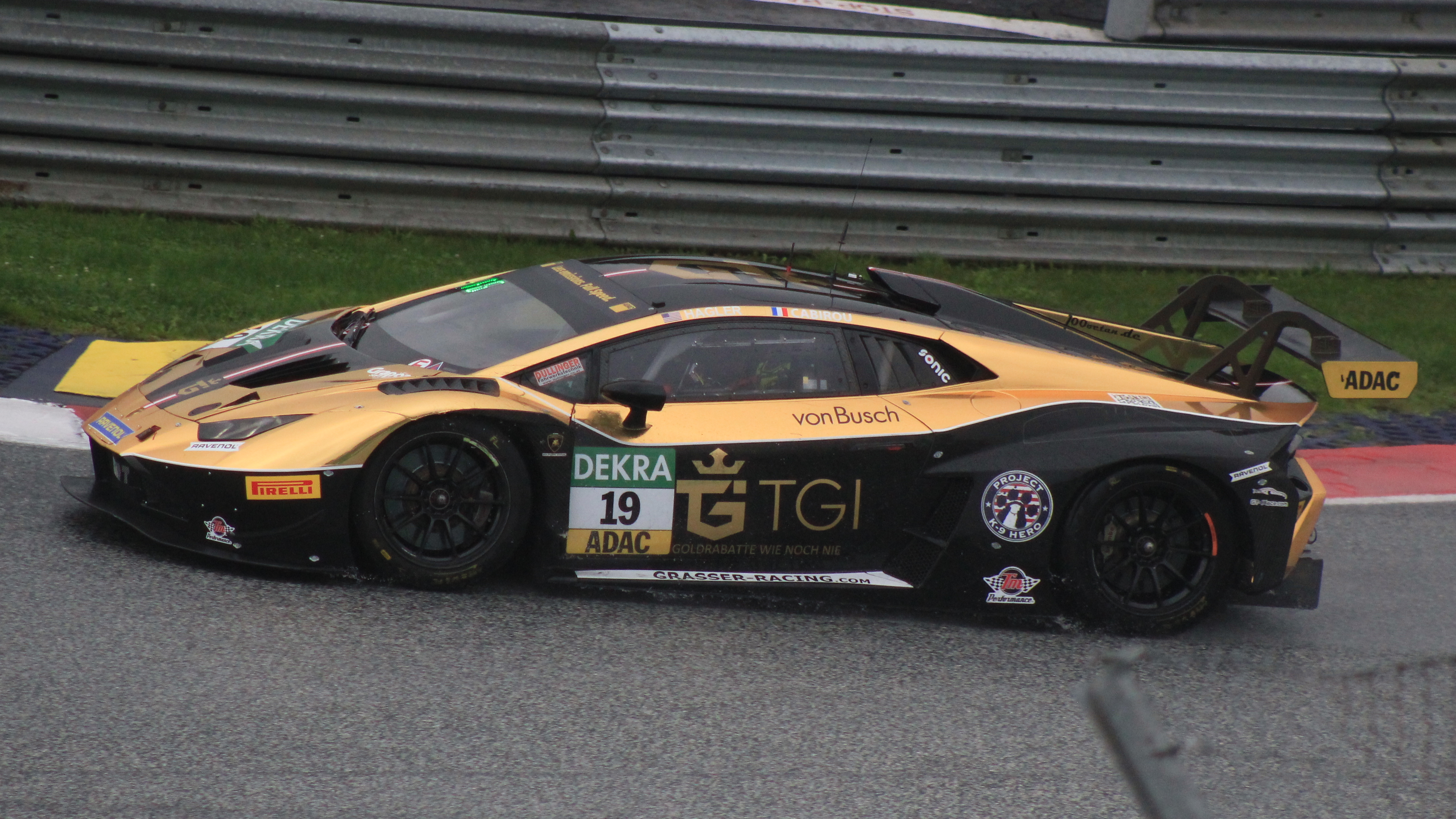
- Nationality: (United States) American
- Born: October 4, 1995 (age 31) Bulverde, Texas, United States

Michelin Pilot Challenge career
- Debut season: 2020
- Current team: Bryan Herta Autosport
- Categorisation: FIA Bronze (until 2019, 2025–); FIA Silver (2020–2024)
- Car number: 1
- Former teams: LA Honda World Racing
- Starts: 45
- Wins: 2
- Podiums: 13
- Poles: 1
- Fastest laps: 3

Previous series
- 2021–2022 2019–2021 2019 2019: GT World Challenge America; TC America Series; 24H Series; SCCA Majors Championship Nationwide

Championship titles
- 2021, 2022: Michelin Pilot Challenge – TCR
- Statistics up to date as of July 29th, 2024.

Taylor Hagler (born October 4, 1995) is an American racing driver, driving for Bryan Herta Autosport in the Michelin Pilot Challenge.

== Career ==
=== Early career ===
Hagler developed an interest in motorsports at a young age, attending NASCAR races with her father at just six years old. At 19, she began attending the Skip Barber Racing School with an unused voucher gifted to her sister, before embarking upon national-level racing competitions in 2018 after graduating from the University of Texas at San Antonio. However, much of her sporting endeavors in her younger years were spent participating in show jumping.

=== Touring and sports car racing ===
In 2018, Hagler began competing in the NASA Texas Spec Miata Championship, taking fifth overall and rookie of the year honors in her first season of competition. The following season, she began a full-season campaign in the TC America Series, competing in the TCA class with X-Factor Racing. Taking two class podiums, at Circuit of the Americas and Watkins Glen, Hagler finished fifth in the TCA classification. She also undertook several part-time drives, making a one-off appearance at the 24H of COTA and appearing several times in the NASA Texas Spec Miata Championship, winning twice.

2020 saw Hagler make her debut in IMSA competition, joining LA Honda World Racing for the full season alongside co-driver Ryan Eversley. She appeared in nine of the ten races run that season, missing the round at Sebring after testing positive for COVID-19. Claiming a lone podium at Mid-Ohio, Hagler finished 9th in the TCR-class drivers' championship.

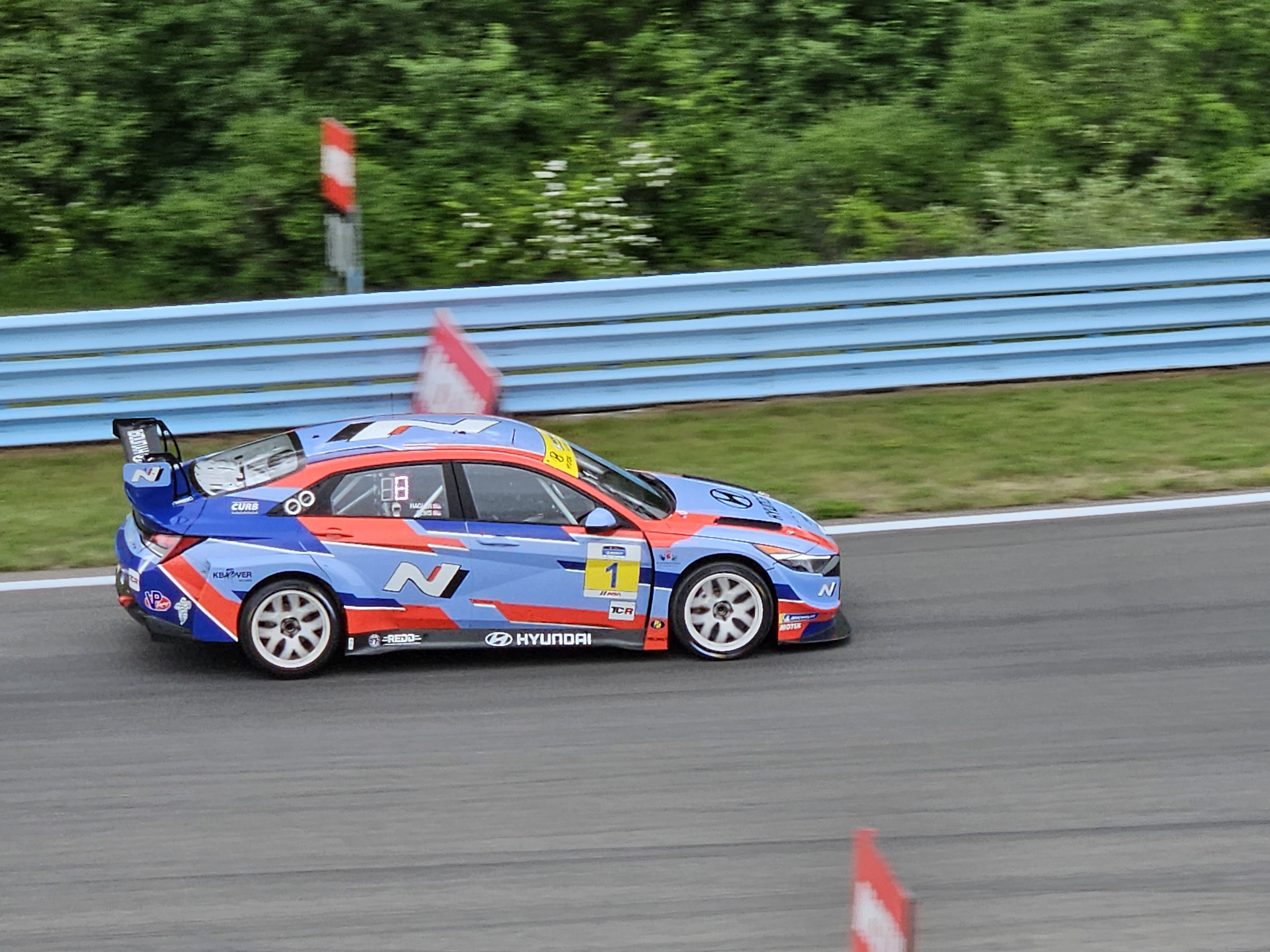
Hagler's Hyundai Elantra N TCR at Watkins Glen in 2023.

2021 would see Hagler take on full-time rides in both the Michelin Pilot Challenge and GT World Challenge America. In the former, she joined Bryan Herta Autosport, driving alongside Michael Lewis in the team's lone Hyundai Veloster N TCR entry. In the latter, she joined fellow HPD GT3 Academy graduates Dakota Dickerson and Jacob Abel, who shared the role of Hagler's co-driver throughout the season. Hagler and Lewis' Michelin Pilot Challenge campaign was incredibly successful, with the duo claiming a class victory at Lime Rock Park and six class podiums en route to winning the TCR class title, over 200 points clear of second-placed Parker Chase. In the process, she became the first female champion in series history. Her GT World Challenge America campaign yielded three class victories and eight class podiums as she finished runner-up in the Pro-Am class to Jan Heylen and Fred Poordad.

For 2022, Hagler continued competing with Bryan Herta Autosport, this time behind the wheel of the Hyundai Elantra N TCR. Paired with Lewis once again, the team focused on consistent finishes as opposed to race victories, tallying seven podiums but only one race victory over the course of the ten race season. Following a podium finish in the final round at Road Atlanta, Hagler claimed her second consecutive TCR-class championship. In the process, the duo became the first driver pairing in the series' TCR class to claim back-to-back titles. Alongside her Michelin Pilot Challenge campaign, Hagler also competed in the Indianapolis 8 Hours for RealTime Racing, joining Michael Cooper and Erin Vogel.

Hagler's 2023 program saw her return to the Michelin Pilot Challenge, with Lewis as her co-driver for the third consecutive season. She was also included in Hyundai North America's lineup for the 2023 Nürburgring 24 Hours, where she would make her debut alongside fellow factory drivers Lewis, Mason Filippi, and Harry Gottsacker. Later in the season, Hagler took on a part-time campaign in the 2023 GT4 European Series, deputizing for the injured Charles Dawson in W&S Motorsport's lineup alongside Gustavo Xavier. Upon Dawson's return from injury, Hagler teamed with Dickerson in an additional W&S entry.

== Personal life ==
Outside of motorsports, Hagler works full-time as an administrative assistant.

== Racing record ==
=== Career summary ===
Season	Series	Team	Races	Wins	Poles	F/Laps	Podiums	Points	Position
2018	NASA Texas Spec Miata Championship		?	?	?	?	?	?	5th
2019	TC America Series - TCA	X-Factor Racing	14	0	0	2	2	133	5th
2019	24H TCE Series - TCR	Atlanta Speedworks	1	0	0	0	0	?	?
2019	Hoosier SCCA Super Tour	Taylor Hagler Motorsport	6	1	0	0	0	54	24th
2020	Michelin Pilot Challenge - TCR	LA Honda World Racing	9	0	1	0	1	223	9th
2020	TC America Series - TCA	LA Honda World Racing	2	0	0	0	0	24	10th
2021	Michelin Pilot Challenge - TCR	Bryan Herta Autosport with Curb-Agajanian	10	1	0	0	5	2610	1st
2021	GT World Challenge America - Pro-Am	Racers Edge Motorsports	13	3	1	0	8	204	2nd
2021	TC America Series - TCA	Bryan Herta Autosport	2	0	0	0	0	12	18th
2022	Michelin Pilot Challenge - TCR	Bryan Herta Autosport with Curb-Agajanian	10	1	0	1	7	2920	1st
2022	GT World Challenge America - Pro-Am	RealTime Racing	1	0	0	0	0	0	NC
2023	Michelin Pilot Challenge - TCR	Bryan Herta Autosport with Curb-Agajanian	10	0	0	0	0	2410	6th
2023	GT4 European Series - Pro-Am	W&S Motorsport	10	0	0	0	0	27	18th
2023	24 Hours of Nürburgring - TCR	Hyundai Motorsport N	1	0	0	0	1	N/A	2nd
2024	Michelin Pilot Challenge - TCR	Bryan Herta Autosport with Curb-Agajanian	10	0	2	1	0	2450	7th
2024	ADAC GT Masters	GRT Grasser Racing Team	8	0	0	0	0	2	23rd

Sporting positions
Preceded by Gabby Chaves; Ryan Norman	Michelin Pilot Challenge; TCR Champion; 2021, 2022; With: Michael Lewis	Succeeded by Harry Gottsacker; Robert Wickens
