= 2020 Michelin Pilot Challenge =

Motor racing competition

The 2020 Michelin Pilot Challenge is the twenty-first season of the IMSA SportsCar Challenge and the seventh season organized by the International Motor Sports Association (IMSA).

== Classes ==
- Grand Sport (GS) (run to SRO GT4 regulations)
- Touring Car (TCR)

== Calendar ==
The 2020 schedule was released on 15 May 2020 and features ten rounds.

Rnd	Race	Circuit	Location	Date	Duration
1	BMW Endurance Challenge at Daytona	(United States) Daytona International Speedway	Daytona Beach, Florida	January 24	4 Hours
2	AdventHealth 120	(United States) Sebring International Raceway	Sebring, Florida	July 17	2 Hours
3	Road America 120	(United States) Road America	Elkhart Lake, Wisconsin	August 1	2 Hours
4	Virginia Is For Racing Lovers Grand Prix	(United States) Virginia International Raceway	Alton, Virginia	August 22	2 Hours
5	VP Racing Stay Frosty 240	(United States) Michelin Raceway Road Atlanta	Braselton, Georgia	September 5	4 Hours
6	Mid-Ohio 120s	(United States) Mid-Ohio Sports Car Course	Lexington, Ohio	September 25	2 Hours
6	Mid-Ohio 120s	(United States) Mid-Ohio Sports Car Course	Lexington, Ohio	September 26	2 Hours
7	Fox Factory 120	(United States) Michelin Raceway Road Atlanta	Braselton, Georgia	October 16	2 Hours
8	WeatherTech Raceway Laguna Seca 120	(United States) WeatherTech Raceway Laguna Seca	Monterey, California	October 31	2 Hours
9	Alan Jay Automotive Network 120	(United States) Sebring International Raceway	Sebring, Florida	November 13	2 Hours

== Entry list ==
=== Grand Sport ===
Team	Car	Engine	No.	Drivers	Rounds
(United States) Automatic Racing AMR	Aston Martin Vantage AMR GT4	Aston Martin 4.0 L Turbo V8	09	(United States) Ramin Abdolvahabi	1–2, 4–5, 7, 9
(United States) Automatic Racing AMR	Aston Martin Vantage AMR GT4	Aston Martin 4.0 L Turbo V8	09	(United States) Rob Ecklin	1–2, 4, 7, 9
(United States) Automatic Racing AMR	Aston Martin Vantage AMR GT4	Aston Martin 4.0 L Turbo V8	09	(United States) Brandon Kidd	1, 5
(United States) Automatic Racing AMR	Aston Martin Vantage AMR GT4	Aston Martin 4.0 L Turbo V8	09	(United States) Tom Long	5
(United States) Automatic Racing AMR	Aston Martin Vantage AMR GT4	Aston Martin 4.0 L Turbo V8	99	(United States) Gary Ferrera	1–2, 5, 7, 9
(United States) Automatic Racing AMR	Aston Martin Vantage AMR GT4	Aston Martin 4.0 L Turbo V8	99	(United States) Kris Wilson	1–2, 5, 7, 9
(United States) Automatic Racing AMR	Aston Martin Vantage AMR GT4	Aston Martin 4.0 L Turbo V8	99	(United States) Ramin Abdolvahabi	3
(United States) Automatic Racing AMR	Aston Martin Vantage AMR GT4	Aston Martin 4.0 L Turbo V8	99	(United States) Rob Ecklin	3
(United States) Automatic Racing AMR	Aston Martin Vantage AMR GT4	Aston Martin 4.0 L Turbo V8	99	(United States) Charles Espenlaub	4
(United States) Automatic Racing AMR	Aston Martin Vantage AMR GT4	Aston Martin 4.0 L Turbo V8	99	(United States) Charlie Putman	4
(United States) Ave Motorsports	Audi R8 LMS GT4	Audi 5.2 L V10	2	(United States) Mark Brummond	1
(United States) Ave Motorsports	Audi R8 LMS GT4	Audi 5.2 L V10	2	(United States) Mike Skeen	1
(Canada) Motorsport in Action	McLaren 570S GT4	McLaren 3.8 L Turbo V8	3	(United States) Corey Lewis	All
(Canada) Motorsport in Action	McLaren 570S GT4	McLaren 3.8 L Turbo V8	3	(United States) Sheena Monk	All
(Germany) Winward Racing/HTP Motorsport	Mercedes-AMG GT4	Mercedes-AMG M178 4.0 L V8	4	(United States) Russell Ward	All
(Germany) Winward Racing/HTP Motorsport	Mercedes-AMG GT4	Mercedes-AMG M178 4.0 L V8	4	(Netherlands) Indy Dontje	1–2, 4–6, 9
(Germany) Winward Racing/HTP Motorsport	Mercedes-AMG GT4	Mercedes-AMG M178 4.0 L V8	4	(United States) Billy Johnson	3
(Germany) Winward Racing/HTP Motorsport	Mercedes-AMG GT4	Mercedes-AMG M178 4.0 L V8	4	(Germany) Nico Bastian	7–8
(Germany) Winward Racing/HTP Motorsport	Mercedes-AMG GT4	Mercedes-AMG M178 4.0 L V8	57	(United States) Bryce Ward	All
(Germany) Winward Racing/HTP Motorsport	Mercedes-AMG GT4	Mercedes-AMG M178 4.0 L V8	57	(United Kingdom) Philip Ellis	1, 4–5, 9
(Germany) Winward Racing/HTP Motorsport	Mercedes-AMG GT4	Mercedes-AMG M178 4.0 L V8	57	(United States) Alec Udell	2–3, 6–8
(United States) Archangel Motorsports with VOLT Racing	Porsche 718 Cayman GT4 Clubsport	Porsche 3.8 L Flat-6	7	(United States) Alan Brynjolfsson	1–6
(United States) Archangel Motorsports with VOLT Racing	Porsche 718 Cayman GT4 Clubsport	Porsche 3.8 L Flat-6	7	(United States) Trent Hindman	1–6
(United States) Archangel Motorsports with VOLT Racing	Aston Martin Vantage AMR GT4	Aston Martin 4.0 L Turbo V8	7	(United States) Alan Brynjolfsson	7–9
(United States) Archangel Motorsports with VOLT Racing	Aston Martin Vantage AMR GT4	Aston Martin 4.0 L Turbo V8	7	(United States) Trent Hindman	7–9
(United States) McCann Racing	Audi R8 LMS GT4 1 Audi R8 LMS GT4 Evo 3–6	Audi 5.2 L V10	8	(United States) Britt Casey Jr.	1, 3, 6
(United States) McCann Racing	Audi R8 LMS GT4 1 Audi R8 LMS GT4 Evo 3–6	Audi 5.2 L V10	8	(United States) Michael McCann	1, 3, 6
(United States) LAP Motorsports	Mercedes-AMG GT4	Mercedes-AMG M178 4.0 L V8	10	(United Kingdom) Dan Clarke	7, 9
(United States) LAP Motorsports	Mercedes-AMG GT4	Mercedes-AMG M178 4.0 L V8	10	(United States) Anton Dias Perera	7, 9
(Canada) AWA	McLaren 570S GT4	McLaren 3.8 L Turbo V8	13	(Canada) Orey Fidani	1
(Canada) AWA	McLaren 570S GT4	McLaren 3.8 L Turbo V8	13	(Canada) Kuno Wittmer	1
(United States) Bluff City Racing with Autometrics	Mercedes-AMG GT4	Mercedes-AMG M178 4.0 L V8	14	(United States) Anton Dias Perera	1–2
(United States) Bluff City Racing with Autometrics	Mercedes-AMG GT4	Mercedes-AMG M178 4.0 L V8	14	(United States) Cory Friedman	1–2
(United States) Bluff City Racing with Autometrics	Mercedes-AMG GT4	Mercedes-AMG M178 4.0 L V8	14	(United Kingdom) Dan Clarke	1
(Canada) Multimatic Motorsports	Ford Mustang GT4	Ford 5.2 L Voodoo V8	15	(United States) Austin Cindric	1
(Canada) Multimatic Motorsports	Ford Mustang GT4	Ford 5.2 L Voodoo V8	15	(United Kingdom) Sebastian Priaulx	1
(Canada) Multimatic Motorsports	Ford Mustang GT4	Ford 5.2 L Voodoo V8	19	(Canada) Scott Maxwell	1
(Canada) Multimatic Motorsports	Ford Mustang GT4	Ford 5.2 L Voodoo V8	19	(Canada) Marco Signoretti	1
(Canada) Multimatic Motorsports	Ford Mustang GT4	Ford 5.2 L Voodoo V8	22	(United States) Chase Briscoe	1
(Canada) Multimatic Motorsports	Ford Mustang GT4	Ford 5.2 L Voodoo V8	22	(United States) Hailie Deegan	1, 8
(Canada) Multimatic Motorsports	Ford Mustang GT4	Ford 5.2 L Voodoo V8	22	(Canada) Scott Maxwell	2–7
(Canada) Multimatic Motorsports	Ford Mustang GT4	Ford 5.2 L Voodoo V8	22	(United Kingdom) Sebastian Priaulx	2–9
(Canada) Multimatic Motorsports	Ford Mustang GT4	Ford 5.2 L Voodoo V8	22	(Canada) Marco Signoretti	9
(United States) M1 Racing	McLaren 570S GT4	McLaren 3.8 L Turbo V8	20	(United States) Ashley Freiberg	5
(United States) M1 Racing	McLaren 570S GT4	McLaren 3.8 L Turbo V8	20	(United States) Ryan Nash	5
(United States) M1 Racing	McLaren 570S GT4	McLaren 3.8 L Turbo V8	20	(United States) Don Yount	5
(United States) M1 Racing	Porsche 718 Cayman GT4 Clubsport	Porsche 3.8 L Flat-6	20	(United States) Ashley Freiberg	7, 9
(United States) M1 Racing	Porsche 718 Cayman GT4 Clubsport	Porsche 3.8 L Flat-6	20	(United States) Ryan Nash	7
(United States) M1 Racing	Porsche 718 Cayman GT4 Clubsport	Porsche 3.8 L Flat-6	20	(United States) Jaden Conwright	9
(United States) Ian Lacy Racing	Ford Mustang GT4	Ford 5.2 L Voodoo V8	24	(United States) Frank Gannett	1, 9
(United States) Ian Lacy Racing	Ford Mustang GT4	Ford 5.2 L Voodoo V8	24	(United States) Drew Staveley	1, 9
(United States) Fast Track Racing/Classic BMW	BMW M4 GT4	BMW N55 3.0 L Twin-Turbo I6	26	(United Kingdom) Robbie Dalgleish	1
(United States) Fast Track Racing/Classic BMW	BMW M4 GT4	BMW N55 3.0 L Twin-Turbo I6	26	(United States) Stevan McAleer	1
(United States) Fast Track Racing/Classic BMW	BMW M4 GT4	BMW N55 3.0 L Twin-Turbo I6	26	(Netherlands) Beitske Visser	1
(United States) Fast Track Racing/Classic BMW	BMW M4 GT4	BMW N55 3.0 L Twin-Turbo I6	26	(United States) Chandler Hull	6
(United States) Fast Track Racing/Classic BMW	BMW M4 GT4	BMW N55 3.0 L Twin-Turbo I6	26	(United States) Toby Grahovec	6
(United States) Team Hardpoint	Audi R8 LMS GT4 1 Audi R8 LMS GT4 Evo 2–5	Audi 5.2 L V10	31	(United States) Robert Ferriol	1–5
(United States) Team Hardpoint	Audi R8 LMS GT4 1 Audi R8 LMS GT4 Evo 2–5	Audi 5.2 L V10	31	(United States) Spencer Pumpelly	1–5
(United States) Wynn's - Riley Motorsports	Mercedes-AMG GT4	Mercedes-AMG M178 4.0 L V8	35	(United States) Jim Cox	All
(United States) Wynn's - Riley Motorsports	Mercedes-AMG GT4	Mercedes-AMG M178 4.0 L V8	35	(United States) Dylan Murry	All
(United States) Wynn's - Riley Motorsports	Mercedes-AMG GT4	Mercedes-AMG M178 4.0 L V8	35	(Netherlands) Jeroen Bleekemolen	1
(United States) Wynn's - Riley Motorsports	Mercedes-AMG GT4	Mercedes-AMG M178 4.0 L V8	35	(United States) Colin Braun	5
(United States) BGB Motorsports	Porsche 718 Cayman GT4 Clubsport	Porsche 3.8 L Flat-6	38	(United States) Thomas Collingwood	All
(United States) BGB Motorsports	Porsche 718 Cayman GT4 Clubsport	Porsche 3.8 L Flat-6	38	(Belgium) Jan Heylen	All
(United States) BGB Motorsports	Porsche 718 Cayman GT4 Clubsport	Porsche 3.8 L Flat-6	38	(United States) John Tecce	1, 5
(United States) CarBahn Motorsports with Peregrine Racing	Audi R8 LMS GT4 1 Audi R8 LMS GT4 Evo 2–9	Audi 5.2 L V10	39	(United States) Tyler McQuarrie	All
(United States) CarBahn Motorsports with Peregrine Racing	Audi R8 LMS GT4 1 Audi R8 LMS GT4 Evo 2–9	Audi 5.2 L V10	39	(United States) Jeff Westphal	All
(United States) CarBahn Motorsports with Peregrine Racing	Audi R8 LMS GT4 1 Audi R8 LMS GT4 Evo 2–9	Audi 5.2 L V10	93	(United States) Tom Dyer	2–4, 6–9
(United States) CarBahn Motorsports with Peregrine Racing	Audi R8 LMS GT4 1 Audi R8 LMS GT4 Evo 2–9	Audi 5.2 L V10	93	(United States) Mark Siegel	2–4, 6–7
(United States) CarBahn Motorsports with Peregrine Racing	Audi R8 LMS GT4 1 Audi R8 LMS GT4 Evo 2–9	Audi 5.2 L V10	93	(United States) Sameer Gandhi	8–9
(United States) PF Racing	Ford Mustang GT4	Ford 5.2 L Voodoo V8	40	(United States) James Pesek	All
(United States) PF Racing	Ford Mustang GT4	Ford 5.2 L Voodoo V8	40	(United States) Jade Buford	1
(United States) PF Racing	Ford Mustang GT4	Ford 5.2 L Voodoo V8	40	(United States) Shane Lewis	1
(United States) PF Racing	Ford Mustang GT4	Ford 5.2 L Voodoo V8	40	(United States) Chad McCumbee	2, 5–9
(United States) PF Racing	Ford Mustang GT4	Ford 5.2 L Voodoo V8	40	(United States) Chase Briscoe	3
(United States) PF Racing	Ford Mustang GT4	Ford 5.2 L Voodoo V8	40	(United States) Drew Staveley	4
(United States) Stephen Cameron Racing	Aston Martin Vantage AMR GT4	Aston Martin 4.0 L Turbo V8	43	(United States) Greg Liefooghe	1, 9
(United States) Stephen Cameron Racing	Aston Martin Vantage AMR GT4	Aston Martin 4.0 L Turbo V8	43	(United States) Ari Balogh	1
(United States) Stephen Cameron Racing	Aston Martin Vantage AMR GT4	Aston Martin 4.0 L Turbo V8	43	(United States) Sean Quinlan	9
(United States) Team TGM	Chevrolet Camaro GT4.R	Chevrolet LT1 6.2 L V8	46	(United States) Hugh Plumb	1
(United States) Team TGM	Chevrolet Camaro GT4.R	Chevrolet LT1 6.2 L V8	46	(United States) Matt Plumb	1
(United States) Team TGM	Chevrolet Camaro GT4.R	Chevrolet LT1 6.2 L V8	64	(United States) Ted Giovanis	1
(United States) Team TGM	Chevrolet Camaro GT4.R	Chevrolet LT1 6.2 L V8	64	(United States) Owen Trinkler	1
(Brazil) MMC Motorsport	Mercedes-AMG GT4	Mercedes-AMG M178 4.0 L V8	51	(Brazil) Átila Abreu	1
(Brazil) MMC Motorsport	Mercedes-AMG GT4	Mercedes-AMG M178 4.0 L V8	51	(Brazil) Leo Sanchez	1
(United States) Murillo Racing	Mercedes-AMG GT4	Mercedes-AMG M178 4.0 L V8	56	(United States) Eric Foss	All
(United States) Murillo Racing	Mercedes-AMG GT4	Mercedes-AMG M178 4.0 L V8	56	(United States) Jeff Mosing	All
(United States) Murillo Racing	Mercedes-AMG GT4	Mercedes-AMG M178 4.0 L V8	65	(United States) Tim Probert	All
(United States) Murillo Racing	Mercedes-AMG GT4	Mercedes-AMG M178 4.0 L V8	65	(United States) Brent Mosing	1, 3–7
(United States) Murillo Racing	Mercedes-AMG GT4	Mercedes-AMG M178 4.0 L V8	65	(United States) Justin Piscitell	1, 9
(United States) Murillo Racing	Mercedes-AMG GT4	Mercedes-AMG M178 4.0 L V8	65	(United States) Kenny Murillo	2, 8
(United States) KohR Motorsports	Ford Mustang GT4	Ford 5.2 L Voodoo V8	59	(United States) Rich Golinello	1
(United States) KohR Motorsports	Ford Mustang GT4	Ford 5.2 L Voodoo V8	59	(United States) Bob Michaelian	1
(United States) KohR Motorsports	Aston Martin Vantage AMR GT4	Aston Martin 4.0 L Turbo V8	60	(Canada) Kyle Marcelli	All
(United States) KohR Motorsports	Aston Martin Vantage AMR GT4	Aston Martin 4.0 L Turbo V8	60	(United States) Nate Stacy	All
(United States) Rebel Rock Racing	Chevrolet Camaro GT4.R	Chevrolet LT1 6.2 L V8	71	(United States) Frank DePew	All
(United States) Rebel Rock Racing	Chevrolet Camaro GT4.R	Chevrolet LT1 6.2 L V8	71	(United Kingdom) Robin Liddell	All
(United States) Rebel Rock Racing	Chevrolet Camaro GT4.R	Chevrolet LT1 6.2 L V8	71	(United States) Andrew Davis	1, 5
(United States) BimmerWorld Racing	BMW M4 GT4	BMW N55 3.0 L Twin-Turbo I6	80	(United States) Nick Galante	All
(United States) BimmerWorld Racing	BMW M4 GT4	BMW N55 3.0 L Twin-Turbo I6	80	(United States) Dillon Machavern	1–7, 9
(United States) BimmerWorld Racing	BMW M4 GT4	BMW N55 3.0 L Twin-Turbo I6	80	(United States) Gregory Liefooghe	8
(United States) BimmerWorld Racing	BMW M4 GT4	BMW N55 3.0 L Twin-Turbo I6	82	(United States) James Clay	All
(United States) BimmerWorld Racing	BMW M4 GT4	BMW N55 3.0 L Twin-Turbo I6	82	(United States) Devin Jones	1–4
(United States) BimmerWorld Racing	BMW M4 GT4	BMW N55 3.0 L Twin-Turbo I6	82	(United States) Gregory Liefooghe	5–7
(United States) BimmerWorld Racing	BMW M4 GT4	BMW N55 3.0 L Twin-Turbo I6	82	(United States) Mike Skeen	8–9
(United States) Turner Motorsport	BMW M4 GT4	BMW N55 3.0 L Twin-Turbo I6	95	(United States) Connor Bloum	1
(United States) Turner Motorsport	BMW M4 GT4	BMW N55 3.0 L Twin-Turbo I6	95	(United States) Aurora Straus	1
(United States) Turner Motorsport	BMW M4 GT4	BMW N55 3.0 L Twin-Turbo I6	95	(United States) Billy Johnson	1
(United States) Turner Motorsport	BMW M4 GT4	BMW N55 3.0 L Twin-Turbo I6	95	(United States) Robby Foley	2–9
(United States) Turner Motorsport	BMW M4 GT4	BMW N55 3.0 L Twin-Turbo I6	95	(United States) Bill Auberlen	2–8
(United States) Turner Motorsport	BMW M4 GT4	BMW N55 3.0 L Twin-Turbo I6	95	(United States) Vin Barletta	8
(United States) Turner Motorsport	BMW M4 GT4	BMW N55 3.0 L Twin-Turbo I6	95	(United States) Cameron Lawrence	9
(United States) Turner Motorsport	BMW M4 GT4	BMW N55 3.0 L Twin-Turbo I6	96	(United States) Vin Barletta	All
(United States) Turner Motorsport	BMW M4 GT4	BMW N55 3.0 L Twin-Turbo I6	96	(United States) Robby Foley	All
(United States) Turner Motorsport	BMW M4 GT4	BMW N55 3.0 L Twin-Turbo I6	96	(United States) Bill Auberlen	1
(United States) Turner Motorsport	BMW M4 GT4	BMW N55 3.0 L Twin-Turbo I6	96	(United States) Andrew Pinkerton	5

=== Touring Car ===
Team	Car	No.	Drivers	Rounds
(United States) KMW Motorsports with TMR Engineering	Alfa Romeo Giulietta Veloce TCR	5	(Argentina) Roy Block	All
(United States) KMW Motorsports with TMR Engineering	Alfa Romeo Giulietta Veloce TCR	5	(United States) Tim Lewis Jr.	All
(France) Team Prémat	Audi RS 3 LMS TCR	18	(France) Alexandre Prémat	1
(France) Team Prémat	Audi RS 3 LMS TCR	18	(United States) Stephen Vajda	1
(United States) Bryan Herta Autosport with Curb-Agajanian	Hyundai Veloster N TCR	21	(United States) Harry Gottsacker	All
(United States) Bryan Herta Autosport with Curb-Agajanian	Hyundai Veloster N TCR	21	(Canada) Mark Wilkins	All
(United States) Bryan Herta Autosport with Curb-Agajanian	Hyundai Veloster N TCR	29	(United States) Spencer Brockman	2–9
(United States) Bryan Herta Autosport with Curb-Agajanian	Hyundai Veloster N TCR	29	(United States) Parker Chase	2–9
(United States) Bryan Herta Autosport with Curb-Agajanian	Hyundai Veloster N TCR	33	(Colombia) Gabby Chaves	All
(United States) Bryan Herta Autosport with Curb-Agajanian	Hyundai Veloster N TCR	33	(United States) Ryan Norman	All
(United States) Bryan Herta Autosport with Curb-Agajanian	Hyundai Veloster N TCR	98	(United States) Mason Filippi	All
(United States) Bryan Herta Autosport with Curb-Agajanian	Hyundai Veloster N TCR	98	(United States) Michael Lewis	All
(United States) FastMD by Syndicate Racing	Audi RS 3 LMS TCR	23	(United States) Max Faulkner	All
(United States) FastMD by Syndicate Racing	Audi RS 3 LMS TCR	23	(Canada) James Vance	All
(United States) FastMD by Syndicate Racing	Audi RS 3 LMS TCR	32	(South Africa) Mikey Taylor	1–2
(United States) FastMD by Syndicate Racing	Audi RS 3 LMS TCR	32	(United States) William Tally	1
(United States) FastMD by Syndicate Racing	Audi RS 3 LMS TCR	32	(United States) Michael McCarthy	2
(United States) Copeland Motorsports	Hyundai Veloster N TCR	27	(United States) Tyler Gonzalez	7, 9
(United States) Copeland Motorsports	Hyundai Veloster N TCR	27	(United States) Tyler Maxson	7, 9
(United States) LA Honda World Racing	Honda Civic Type R TCR (FK8)	37	(United States) Shelby Blackstock	1–5
(United States) LA Honda World Racing	Honda Civic Type R TCR (FK8)	37	(United States) Chris Miller	1–5
(United States) LA Honda World Racing	Honda Civic Type R TCR (FK8)	73	(United States) Mike LaMarra	1–5, 7
(United States) LA Honda World Racing	Honda Civic Type R TCR (FK8)	73	(United States) Mat Pombo	1–5, 7
(United States) LA Honda World Racing	Honda Civic Type R TCR (FK8)	77	(United States) Ryan Eversley	All
(United States) LA Honda World Racing	Honda Civic Type R TCR (FK8)	77	(United States) Taylor Hagler	1, 3–9
(United States) LA Honda World Racing	Honda Civic Type R TCR (FK8)	77	(United States) Dakota Dickerson	2
(United States) Forty 7 Motorsports	Hyundai Veloster N TCR	47	(United States) Alex Papadopulos	1–5
(United States) Forty 7 Motorsports	Hyundai Veloster N TCR	47	(United States) Dario Cangialosi	1
(United States) Forty 7 Motorsports	Hyundai Veloster N TCR	47	(United States) Ben Waddell	2–5
(United States) Forty 7 Motorsports	Hyundai Veloster N TCR	47	(United States) Jason Rabe	5
(United States) Forty 7 Motorsports	Hyundai Veloster N TCR	74	(United States) AJ Muss	1
(United States) Forty 7 Motorsports	Hyundai Veloster N TCR	74	(United States) Ben Waddell	1
(United States) JDC-Miller MotorSports	Audi RS 3 LMS TCR	54	(United States) Michael Johnson	1–6
(United States) JDC-Miller MotorSports	Audi RS 3 LMS TCR	54	(South Africa) Stephen Simpson	1–6
(United States) Road Shagger Racing	Audi RS 3 LMS TCR	61	(United Kingdom) Gavin Ernstone	All
(United States) Road Shagger Racing	Audi RS 3 LMS TCR	61	(United States) Jonathan Morley	All
(Canada) TWOth Autosport	Audi RS 3 LMS TCR	81	(Canada) Travis Hill	1
(Canada) TWOth Autosport	Audi RS 3 LMS TCR	81	(Canada) Ron Tomlinson	1
(United States) Atlanta Speedwerks	Honda Civic Type R TCR (FK8)	84	(United States) Brian Henderson	1, 7, 9
(United States) Atlanta Speedwerks	Honda Civic Type R TCR (FK8)	84	(United States) Todd Lamb	1, 7
(United States) Atlanta Speedwerks	Honda Civic Type R TCR (FK8)	84	(United States) Robert Noaker	9
(United States) Atlanta Speedwerks	Honda Civic Type R TCR (FK8)	94	(Puerto Rico) Bryan Ortiz	1, 7
(United States) Atlanta Speedwerks	Honda Civic Type R TCR (FK8)	94	(United States) Nikko Reger	1
(United States) Atlanta Speedwerks	Honda Civic Type R TCR (FK8)	94	(United States) Cliff Brown	7
(United States) AOA Racing	Audi RS 3 LMS TCR	85	(United States) Gino Manley	7, 9
(United States) AOA Racing	Audi RS 3 LMS TCR	85	(South Africa) Giano Taurino	7
(United States) AOA Racing	Audi RS 3 LMS TCR	85	(United States) Mike Ogren	9
(United States) HART	Honda Civic Type R TCR (FK8)	89	(United States) Steve Eich	1
(United States) HART	Honda Civic Type R TCR (FK8)	89	(United States) Chad Gilsinger	1
(United States) HART	Honda Civic Type R TCR (FK8)	89	(United States) Cameron Lawrence	1
(United States) Van Der Steur Racing LLC	Hyundai Veloster N TCR	91	(Costa Rica) Danny Formal	9
(United States) Van Der Steur Racing LLC	Hyundai Veloster N TCR	91	(United States) Rory van der Steur	9

== Race results ==
Bold indicates overall winner.

Rnd	Circuit	GS Winning Car	TCR Winning Car
Rnd	Circuit	GS Winning Drivers	TCR Winning Drivers
1	(United States) Daytona	**(United States) No. 35 Riley Motorsports**	(United States) No. 61 Road Shagger Racing
1	(United States) Daytona	**(Netherlands) Jeroen Bleekemolen** **(United States) Jim Cox** **(United States) Dylan Murry**	(United Kingdom) Gavin Ernstone (United States) Jonathan Morley
2	(United States) Sebring	**(United States) No. 39 CarBahn with Peregrine Racing**	(United States) No. 21 Bryan Herta Autosport w/ Curb-Agajanian
2	(United States) Sebring	**(United States) Tyler McQuarrie** **(United States) Jeff Westphal**	(United States) Harry Gottsacker (Canada) Mark Wilkins
3	(United States) Road America	**(Canada) No. 3 Motorsport in Action**	(United States) No. 33 Bryan Herta Autosport w/ Curb-Agajanian
3	(United States) Road America	**(United States) Corey Lewis** **(United States) Sheena Monk**	(Colombia) Gabby Chaves (United States) Ryan Norman
4	(United States) Virginia	**(United States) No. 95 Turner Motorsport**	(United States) No. 98 Bryan Herta Autosport w/ Curb-Agajanian
4	(United States) Virginia	**(United States) Bill Auberlen** **(United States) Robby Foley**	(United States) Mason Filippi (United States) Michael Lewis
5	(United States) Road Atlanta	**(United States) No. 71 Rebel Rock Racing**	(United States) No. 33 Bryan Herta Autosport w/ Curb-Agajanian
5	(United States) Road Atlanta	**(United States) Andrew Davis** **(United States) Frank DePew** **(United Kingdom) Robin Liddell**	(Colombia) Gabby Chaves (United States) Ryan Norman
6	(United States) Mid-Ohio	**(United States) No. 60 KohR Motorsports**	(United States) No. 23 FastMD by Syndicate Racing
6	(United States) Mid-Ohio	**(Canada) Kyle Marcelli** **(United States) Nate Stacy**	(United States) Max Faulkner (Canada) James Vance
6	(United States) Mid-Ohio	**(United States) No. 60 KohR Motorsports**	(United States) No. 61 Road Shagger Racing
6	(United States) Mid-Ohio	**(Canada) Kyle Marcelli** **(United States) Nate Stacy**	(United Kingdom) Gavin Ernstone (United States) Jonathan Morley
7	(United States) Road Atlanta	**(United States) No. 96 Turner Motorsport**	(United States) No. 98 Bryan Herta Autosport w/ Curb-Agajanian
7	(United States) Road Atlanta	**(United States) Vin Barletta** **(United States) Robby Foley**	(United States) Mason Filippi (United States) Michael Lewis
8	(United States) Laguna Seca	**(United States) No. 39 CarBahn with Peregrine Racing**	(United States) No. 33 Bryan Herta Autosport w/ Curb-Agajanian
8	(United States) Laguna Seca	**(United States) Tyler McQuarrie** **(United States) Jeff Westphal**	(Colombia) Gabby Chaves (United States) Ryan Norman
9	(United States) Sebring	**(United States) No. 95 Turner Motorsport**	(United States) No. 21 Bryan Herta Autosport w/ Curb-Agajanian
9	(United States) Sebring	**(United States) Robby Foley** **(United States) Cameron Lawrence**	(United States) Harry Gottsacker (Canada) Mark Wilkins

== Championship standings ==
=== Points systems ===
Championship points are awarded in each class at the finish of each event. Points are awarded based on finishing positions as shown in the chart below.

Position	1	2	3	4	5	6	7	8	9	10	11	12	13	14	15	16	17	18	19	20	21	22	23	24	25	26	27	28	29	30	31+
Race	35	32	30	28	26	25	24	23	22	21	20	19	18	17	16	15	14	13	12	11	10	9	8	7	6	5	4	3	2	1	0

Team points

Team points are calculated in exactly the same way as driver points, using the point distribution chart. Each car entered is considered its own "team" regardless if it is a single entry or part of a two-car team.

=== Team's Championships ===
==== Grand Sport ====
Pos.	Team	Car	DAY	SEB1	ELK	VIR	ATL1	MOH		ATL2	LGA	SEB2	Points
1	#60 KohR Motorsports	Aston Martin Vantage AMR GT4	5	2	**2**	6	**7**	**1**	**1**	6	3	3	294
2	#39 CarBahn Motorsports with Peregrine Racing	Audi R8 LMS GT4	4	**1**	3	12	4	2	3	**19**	**1**	**21**	260
3	#95 Turner Motorsport	BMW M4 GT4	28	5	5	1	14	6	8	10	5	1	237
4	#35 Riley Motorsports	Mercedes-AMG GT4	1	9	4	2	21	19	2	9	13	5	237
5	#56 Murillo Racing	Mercedes-AMG GT4	8	6	7	9	10	10	7	4	7	11	232
6	#7 Archangel Motorsports	Porsche 718 Cayman GT4 Clubsport	23	3	6	5	3	14	15				225
6	#7 Archangel Motorsports	Aston Martin Vantage AMR GT4								22	2	2	225
7	#4 Winward Racing/HTP Motorsport	Mercedes-AMG GT4	3	4	16	**19**	5	3	18	5	4	16	224
8	#40 PF Racing	Ford Mustang GT4	11	11	13	15	8	9	4	8	16	7	209
9	#3 Motorsports in Action	McLaren 570S GT4	18	12	1	20	12	16	9	7	9	4	208
10	#57 Winward Racing/HTP Motorsport	Mercedes-AMG GT4	2	15	11	7	17	4	6	13	10	23	207
11	#22 Multimatic Motorsports	Ford Mustang GT4	29	8	8	4	2	5	19	18	11	6	204
12	#82 BimmerWorld Racing	BMW M4 GT4	6	10	10	WD	9	11	12	2	8	14	201
13	#80 BimmerWorld Racing	BMW M4 GT4	19	7	12	11	6	8	17	12	6	22	191
14	#38 BGB Motorsports	Porsche 718 Cayman GT4 Clubsport	16	14	15	8	15	7	13	21	15	17	170
15	#71 Rebel Rock Racing	Chevrolet Camaro GT4.R	13	22	18	10	1	DNS	DNS	3	17	10	161
16	#96 Turner Motorsport	BMW M4 GT4	31	21	20	3	16	17	10	1	DNS	12	144
17	#93 CarBahn with Peregrine Racing	Audi R8 LMS GT4		16	21	16		15	5	20	12	8	135
18	#65 Murillo Racing	Mercedes-AMG GT4	25	17	17	18	20	13	16	15	14	24	132
19	#99 Automatic Racing AMR	Aston Martin Vantage AMR GT4	15	18	19	14	18			11		20	103
20	#31 Team Hardpoint	Audi R8 LMS GT4	9	13	9	13	11						100
21	#09 Automatic Racing AMR	Aston Martin Vantage AMR GT4	17	19		17	13			17		18	86
22	#8 McCann Racing	Audi R8 LMS GT4	10		14			18	11				71
23	#20 M1 Racing LLC	McLaren 570S GT4					19						48
23	#20 M1 Racing LLC	Porsche 718 Cayman GT4 Clubsport								14		13	48
24	#43 Stephen Cameron Racing	Aston Martin Vantage AMR GT4	7										46
24	#43 Stephen Cameron Racing	BMW M4 GT4										9	46
25	#26 Fast Track Racing/Classic BMW	BMW M4 GT4	22					12	14				45
26	#24 Ian Lacy Racing	Ford Mustang GT4	12									15	36
27	#10 LAP Motorsports	Mercedes-AMG GT4								16		19	28
28	#14 Bluff City Racing with Autometrics	Mercedes-AMG GT4	21	20									21
29	#64 Team TGM	Chevrolet Camaro GT4.R	14										17
30	#51 MMC Motorsport	Mercedes-AMG GT4	20										11
31	#19 Multimatic Motorsports	Ford Mustang GT4	24										7
32	#13 AWA	McLaren 570S GT4	**26**										5
33	#59 KohR Motorsports	Ford Mustang GT4	27										4
34	#15 Multimatic Motorsports	Ford Mustang GT4	30										1
35	#46 Team TGM	Chevrolet Camaro GT4.R	32										0
36	#2 Ave Motorsports	Audi R8 LMS GT4	33										0
Pos.	Team	Car	DAY	SEB1	ELK	VIR	ALT1	MOH		ATL2	LGA	SEB2	Points

Colour	Result
Gold	Winner
Silver	Second place
Bronze	Third place
Green	Points classification
Blue	Non-points classification
Blue	Non-classified finish (NC)
Purple	Retired, not classified (Ret)
Red	Did not qualify (DNQ)
Red	Did not pre-qualify (DNPQ)
Black	Disqualified (DSQ)
White	Did not start (DNS)
White	Withdrew (WD)
White	Race cancelled (C)
Blank	Did not practice (DNP)
Blank	Did not arrive (DNA)
Blank	Excluded (EX)

**Bold** - Pole position
Italics - Fastest lap

==== Touring Car ====
Pos.	Team	Car	DAY	SEB1	ELK	VIR	ATL1	MOH		ATL2	LGA	SEB2	Points
1	#33 Bryan Herta Autosport with Curb-Agajanian	Hyundai Veloster N TCR	5	**7**	1	5	1	7	2	11	1	2	289
2	#21 Bryan Herta Autosport with Curb-Agajanian	Hyundai Veloster N TCR	6	1	3	2	**9**	6	9	4	**7**	**1**	278
3	#98 Bryan Herta Autosport with Curb-Agajanian	Hyundai Veloster N TCR	4	2	11	1	5	5	4	1	8	11	273
4	#61 Road Shagger Racing	Audi RS3 LMS TCR	1	8	9	7	11	3	1	7	2	9	267
5	#23 FastMD by Syndicate Racing	Audi RS3 LMS TCR	11	4	**5**	**10**	10	**1**	5	10	5	3	254
6	#29 Bryan Herta Autosport with Curb-Agajanian	Hyundai Veloster N TCR		11	2	3	2	4	6	6	3	8	245
7	#77 LA Honda World Racing	Honda Civic Type R TCR (FK8)	12	12	10	12	4	2	**7**	5	4	5	242
8	#5 KMW Motorsports with TMR Engineering	Alfa Romeo Giulietta Veloce TCR	**13**	6	4	11	6	9	8	9	6	4	236
9	#54 JDC-Miller MotorSports	Audi RS3 LMS TCR	3	9	6	8	8	8	3				176
10	#73 LA Honda World Racing	Honda Civic Type R TCR (FK8)	8	10	8	4	3			12			144
11	#47 Forty 7 Motorsports	Hyundai Veloster N TCR	16	3	7	9	7						115
12	#84 Atlanta Speedwerks	Honda Civic Type R TCR (FK8)	10							**3**		6	76
13	#37 LA Honda World Racing	Honda Civic Type R TCR (FK8)	18	13	12	6	DNS						75
14	#32 FastMD by Syndicate Racing	Audi RS3 LMS TCR	2	5									58
15	#27 Copeland Motorsports	Hyundai Veloster N TCR								2		10	53
16	#85 AOA Racing	Audi RS3 LMS TCR								13		7	42
17	#94 Atlanta Speedwerks	Honda Civic Type R TCR (FK8)	15							8			39
18	#81 TWOth Autosport	Audi RS3 LMS TCR	7										24
19	#74 Forty 7 Motorsports	Hyundai Veloster N TCR	9										22
20	#91 Van der Steur Racing LLC	Hyundai Veloster N TCR										12	19
21	#18 Team Prémat	Audi RS3 LMS TCR	14										17
22	#89 HART	Honda Civic Type R TCR (FK8)	17										14
Pos.	Team	Car	DAY	SEB1	ELK	VIR	ATL1	MOH		ATL2	LGA	SEB2	Points

=== Manufacturer's Championships ===
==== Grand Sport ====
Pos.	Manufacturer	DAY	SEB1	ELK	VIR	ATL1	MOH		ATL2	LGA	SEB2	Points
1	(United Kingdom) Aston Martin	5	2	**2**	6	**7**	**1**	**1**	6	2	2	306
2	(Germany) Mercedes-AMG	1	4	4	**2**	5	3	2	4	4	5	299
3	(Germany) Audi	4	**1**	3	12	4	2	3	**19**	**1**	**8**	294
4	(Germany) BMW	6	5	5	1	6	6	8	1	5	1	290
5	(United States) Ford	11	8	8	4	2	5	4	8	11	6	269
6	(United Kingdom) McLaren	**18**	12	1	20	12	16	9	7	9	4	259
7	(Germany) Porsche	16	3	6	5	3	7	13	14	15	13	257
8	(United States) Chevrolet	13	22	18	10	1	DNS	DNS	3	17	10	210
Pos.	Manufacturer	DAY	SEB1	ELK	VIR	ALT1	MOH		ATL2	LGA	SEB2	Points

==== Touring Car ====
Pos.	Manufacturer	DAY	SEB1	ELK	VIR	ATL1	MOH		ATL2	LGA	SEB2	Points
1	(South Korea) Hyundai	4	**1**	1	1	**1**	4	2	1	**1**	**1**	339
2	(Germany) Audi	1	4	**5**	**7**	8	**1**	1	7	2	3	319
3	(Japan) Honda	8	10	8	4	3	2	**7**	**3**	4	5	302
4	(Italy) Alfa Romeo	**13**	6	4	11	6	9	8	9	6	4	290
Pos.	Manufacturer	DAY	SEB1	ROA	VIR	ALT1	MOH		ATL2	LGA	SEB2	Points
