= 2019 TC America Series =

Motor racing season

The 2019 TC America Series was the first season of the United States Auto Club's TC America Series. It was the third season of the series, originally part of the Touring Car categories at the 2017 Pirelli World Challenge, and second season as a standalone class. Under the global realignment of the Blancpain GT World Challenge America by SRO Motorsports Group, the GT4 and TCR classes are now declared separate support series, and not under the same umbrella of the World Challenge as it was prior to SRO's ownership. However, the series will continue to be part of the World Challenge. The TCR division will include a DSG Cup for vehicles equipped with a Direct-shift gearbox.

== Calendar ==
At the annual press conference during the 2018 24 Hours of Spa on 27 July, the Stéphane Ratel Organisation announced the first draft of the 2019 calendar.

Round	Circuit	Date
1	Circuit of the Americas, Elroy, Texas	1-3 March
2	St. Petersburg Street Course, St. Petersburg, Florida	8-10 March
3	Virginia International Raceway, Alton, Virginia	26-28 April
4	Sonoma Raceway, Sonoma, California	7-9 June
5	Portland International Raceway, Portland, Oregon	12–14 July
6	(New York (state)) Watkins Glen International, Watkins Glen, New York	30 August–1 September
7	Road America, Elkhart Lake, Wisconsin	20-22 September
8	Las Vegas Motor Speedway, Las Vegas, Nevada	18-20 October

The round at St. Petersburg is for TCR and TCA cars. TCA cars are ineligible to score points.

== Entry list ==
=== TCR/TCA ===
Team	Car	No.	Drivers	Class	Rounds
TCR entries
(United States) RS Werkes	Audi RS 3 LMS TCR (DSG)	011	(United States) Todd Archer	DSG	1
(United States) RS Werkes	Audi RS 3 LMS TCR (DSG)	11	(United States) Jay Salinsky	DSG	2
(United States) McCann Racing	Audi RS 3 LMS TCR (DSG)	3	(United States) Michael McCann	DSG	1–4
(United States) McCann Racing	Audi RS 3 LMS TCR	3	(United States) Michael McCann	TCR	5–8
(United States) McCann Racing	Audi RS 3 LMS TCR (DSG)	27	(United States) Christian Cole	DSG	All
(United States) McCann Racing	Audi RS 3 LMS TCR	83	(United States) Britt Casey Jr.	TCR	3
(United States) TFB	Hyundai Veloster N TCR	12	(United States) Mason Filippi	TCR	1
(United States) Copeland Motorsports	Hyundai Veloster N TCR	12	(United States) Mason Filippi	TCR	4–6, 8
(United States) LAP Motorsports	Honda Civic Type R TCR (FK8)	14	(United States) Nelson Cheung	TCR	1, 4
(United States) eEuroparts.com ROWE Racing	Audi RS 3 LMS TCR (DSG)	15	(United States) Brian Putt	DSG	1–6
(United States) BSport Racing	Audi RS 3 LMS TCR (DSG)	15	(United States) Brian Putt	DSG	7–8
(United States) EXR Team by Premat	Audi RS 3 LMS TCR (DSG)	18	(United States) Stephen Vajda	DSG	4–6, 8
(United States) Risi Competizione	Alfa Romeo Giulietta TCR	34	(United States) James Walker	TCR	All
(Canada) TWOth Autosports	Audi RS 3 LMS TCR (DSG)	37	(United States) Eddie Killeen	DSG	1–2, 6
(Canada) TWOth Autosports	Audi RS 3 LMS TCR (DSG)	41	(Canada) Travis Hill	DSG	6
(Canada) Alphasonic Motorsport	Audi RS 3 LMS TCR (DSG)	45	(Canada) Nelson Chan	DSG	1–2
(Canada) Alphasonic Motorsport	Audi RS 3 LMS TCR (DSG)	47	(Canada) Alain Lauziere	DSG	1–2
(United States) FCP Euro	Volkswagen Golf GTI TCR	71	(United States) Michael Hurczyn	TCR	All
(United States) FCP Euro	Volkswagen Golf GTI TCR	72	(United States) Nate Vincent	TCR	All
(Puerto Rico) VGMC Racing	Honda Civic Type R TCR (FK8)	99	(Puerto Rico) Victor Gonzalez	TCR	3–8
TCA entries
Team	Car	No.	Drivers	Rounds	
(United States) X-Factor Racing	Honda Civic Si	02	(United States) Stephen Jeu	All	
(United States) X-Factor Racing	Honda Civic Si	25	(United States) Cole Ciraulo	All	
(United States) X-Factor Racing	Honda Civic Si	69	(United States) Chris Haldeman	All	
(United States) X-Factor Racing	Honda Civic Si	77	(United States) Taylor Hagler	All	
(United States) Ives Motorsports	Mazda Global MX-5 Cup	07	(Cape Verde) Jose DaSilva	All	
(United States) Ian Lacy Racing	Mazda Global MX-5 Cup	10	(United States) Jenny Gannett	All	
(United States) Copeland Motorsports	Mazda Global MX-5 Cup	50	(United States) Dinah Weisberg	All	
(United States) Copeland Motorsports	Mazda Global MX-5 Cup	70	(Puerto Rico) Bryan Ortiz	8	
(United States) Copeland Motorsports	Mazda Global MX-5 Cup	74	(United States) Tyler Maxson	All	
(United Kingdom) MINI JCW Team	MINI Cooper	59	(United States) Mark Pombo	All	
(United Kingdom) MINI JCW Team	MINI Cooper	60	(United States) Nate Norenberg	All	
(United Kingdom) MINI JCW Team	MINI Cooper	61	(United States) Luis Perocarpi	6	
(United Kingdom) MINI JCW Team	MINI Cooper	61	(United States) Mat Pombo	7–8	
(United Kingdom) MINI JCW Team	MINI Cooper	62	(United States) Tomas Mejia	6–8	
(United States) TechSport Racing	Subaru BRZ tS	22	(Canada) Damon Surzyshyn	All	
(United States) TechSport Racing	Subaru BRZ tS	24	(United States) Robert Crocker	1, 3–5	
(United States) TechSport Racing	Subaru BRZ tS	24	(United States) Mike Ogren	6	
(United States) TechSport Racing	Subaru BRZ tS	29	(United States) Breton Williams	7	
(United States) TechSport Racing	Subaru BRZ tS	44	(Canada) P. J. Groenke	All	
(United States) TechSport Racing	Subaru BRZ tS	44	(United States) Kevin Anderson	*	
(United States) TechSport Racing	Subaru BRZ tS	91	(Canada) Nick Wittmer	All	
(United States) TechSport Racing	Subaru BRZ tS	91	(United States) Eric Powell	*	
(United States) TechSport Racing	Subaru BRZ tS	95	(United States) Ben Bettenhausen	1, 3–6	
(United States) TechSport Racing	Subaru BRZ tS	95	(United States) Mike Ogren	*	
(United States) Bryan Herta Autosport with Curb Agajanian	Hyundai Veloster Turbo R-Spec	57	(United States) Tyler Gonzalez	8	
(United States) #TEAMSALLY	Honda Civic Si	780	(United States) Sally McNulty	1, 4–6	

Icon	Class
TCR	TCR
DSG	TCR DSG Cup

Notes

- – Drivers with an asterisk in the "Rounds" column took part in the non-championship round at St. Petersburg.

=== TC ===
Team	Car	No.	Drivers	Rounds
(United States) Dynamic Racing Solutions	BMW M235i Racing	06	(United States) Bruce Wexler	1
(United States) Dynamic Racing Solutions	BMW M235i Racing	06	(United States) Hanna Zellers	5–7
(United States) Dynamic Racing Solutions	BMW M235i Racing	09	(United States) Greg Nitzkowski	1, 3
(United States) Dynamic Racing Solutions	BMW M240i Racing	09	(United States) Greg Nitzkowski	4–7
(United States) Lone Star Racing	BMW M235i Racing	4	(United States) Zane Hodgen	1
(United States) AutoTechnic Racing	BMW M235i Racing; BMW M240i Racing	20	(United States) Robert Nimkoff	All
(United States) AutoTechnic Racing	BMW M235i Racing; BMW M240i Racing	21	(United States) John Allen	1–3
(United States) AutoTechnic Racing	BMW M235i Racing; BMW M240i Racing	21	(United States) Mark Brummond	5
(United States) AutoTechnic Racing	BMW M235i Racing; BMW M240i Racing	52	(United States) Tom Capizzi	All
(United States) TechSport Racing	Nissan 370Z	23	(United States) Joseph Federl	All
(United States) TechSport Racing	Nissan 370Z	32	(United States) Shehan Chandrasoma	2
(United States) Classic BMW	BMW M240i Racing	26	(United States) Toby Grahovec	All
(United States) Classic BMW	BMW M240i Racing	810	(United States) Jacob Ruud	5
(United States) Hard Motorsport	BMW M235i Racing	31	(United States) Shaun Webster	3
(United States) Rearden Racing	Nissan 370Z	33	(United States) Paul Terry	All
(United States) Murillo Racing	BMW M235i Racing	55	(United States) Moisey Uretsky	1–4
(United States) NULITE	BMW M240i Racing	56	(United States) John Kerr	6
(United States) NULITE	BMW M240i Racing	66	(United States) Peter Atwater	1, 4, 6
(United States) GenRacer	Hyundai Genesis Coupe	78	(United States) Jeff Ricca	1–2, 5–7
(United States) Rooster Hall Racing	BMW M235i Racing; BMW M240i Racing	80	(Denmark) Johan Schwartz	All
(United States) Rooster Hall Racing	BMW M235i Racing; BMW M240i Racing	81	(United States) Steve Stremier	All
(United States) Rooster Hall Racing	BMW M235i Racing; BMW M240i Racing	84	(South Africa) Richard Zulman	All
(United States) Bimmerworld Racing	BMW M240i Racing	82	(United States) Cameron Evans	All
(United States) Bimmerworld Racing	BMW M240i Racing	94	(United States) Chandler Hull	All
(United States) Dasboot Motorsports	BMW M240i Racing	90	(United States) Austen Smith	7

== Race results ==
=== TCR/TCA ===
Bold indicates overall winner.

Round		Circuit	Pole position	TCR Winners	DSG Cup Winners	TCA Winners
1	R1	(Texas) Austin	(United States) No. 72 FCP Euro	**(United States) No. 12 TFB**	(Canada) No. 47 Alphasonic Motorsport	(United States) No. 91 TechSport Racing
1	R1	(Texas) Austin	(United States) Nate Vincent	**(United States) Mason Filippi**	(Canada) Alain Lauziere	(Canada) Nick Wittmer
1	R2	(Texas) Austin	(United States) No. 12 TFB	**(United States) No. 12 TFB**	(Canada) No. 47 Alphasonic Motorsport	(United States) No. 91 TechSport Racing
1	R2	(Texas) Austin	(United States) Mason Filippi	**(United States) Mason Filippi**	(Canada) Alain Lauziere	(Canada) Nick Wittmer
2	R1	(Florida) St. Petersburg	(United States) No. 71 FCP Euro	**(United States) No. 71 FCP Euro**	(United States) No. 15 eEuroparts.com ROWE Racing	(United States) No. 91 TechSport Racing
2	R1	(Florida) St. Petersburg	(United States) Michael Hurczyn	**(United States) Michael Hurczyn**	(United States) Brian Putt	(United States) Eric Powell
2	R2	(Florida) St. Petersburg	(United States) No. 72 FCP Euro	**(United States) No. 72 FCP Euro**	(United States) No. 15 eEuroparts.com ROWE Racing	(United States) No. 91 TechSport Racing
2	R2	(Florida) St. Petersburg	(United States) Nate Vincent	**(United States) Nate Vincent**	(United States) Brian Putt	(United States) Eric Powell
3	R1	Virginia	(United States) No. 83 McCann Racing	(United States) No. 71 FCP Euro	**(United States) No. 3 McCann Racing**	(United States) No. 91 TechSport Racing
3	R1	Virginia	(United States) Britt Casey Jr.	(United States) Michael Hurczyn	**(United States) Michael McCann**	(Canada) Nick Wittmer
3	R2	Virginia	(United States) No. 71 FCP Euro	**(United States) No. 83 McCann Racing**	(United States) No. 27 McCann Racing	(United States) No. 91 TechSport Racing
3	R2	Virginia	(United States) Michael Hurczyn	**(United States) Britt Casey Jr.**	(United States) Christian Cole	(Canada) Nick Wittmer
4	R1	(California) Sonoma	(United States) No. 12 Copeland Motorsports	**(Puerto Rico) No. 99 VGMC Racing**	(United States) No. 15 eEuroparts.com ROWE Racing	(United States) No. 74 Copeland Motorsports
4	R1	(California) Sonoma	(United States) Mason Filippi	**(Puerto Rico) Victor Gonzalez**	(United States) Brian Putt	(United States) Tyler Maxson
4	R2	(California) Sonoma	(United States) No. 12 Copeland Motorsports	**(United States) No. 12 Copeland Motorsports**	(United States) No. 15 eEuroparts.com ROWE Racing	(United States) No. 74 Copeland Motorsports
4	R2	(California) Sonoma	(United States) Mason Filippi	**(United States) Mason Filippi**	(United States) Brian Putt	(United States) Tyler Maxson
5	R1	(Oregon) Portland	(United States) No. 12 Copeland Motorsports	**(United States) No. 12 Copeland Motorsports**	(United States) No. 15 eEuroparts.com ROWE Racing	(United States) No. 91 TechSport Racing
5	R1	(Oregon) Portland	(United States) Mason Filippi	**(United States) Mason Filippi**	(United States) Brian Putt	(Canada) Nick Wittmer
5	R2	(Oregon) Portland	(United States) No. 71 FCP Euro	**(United States) No. 71 FCP Euro**	(United States) No. 15 eEuroparts.com ROWE Racing	(United Kingdom) No. 59 MINI JCW Team
5	R2	(Oregon) Portland	(United States) Michael Hurczyn	**(United States) Michael Hurczyn**	(United States) Brian Putt	(United States) Mark Pombo
6	R1	(New York (state)) Watkins Glen	(United States) No. 3 McCann Racing	**(United States) No. 3 McCann Racing**	(Canada) No. 41 TWOth Autosports	(United Kingdom) No. 59 MINI JCW Team
6	R1	(New York (state)) Watkins Glen	(United States) Michael McCann	**(United States) Michael McCann**	(Canada) Travis Hill	(United States) Mark Pombo
6	R2	(New York (state)) Watkins Glen	(United States) No. 3 McCann Racing	**(United States) No. 3 McCann Racing**	(Canada) No. 41 TWOth Autosports	(United Kingdom) No. 59 MINI JCW Team
6	R2	(New York (state)) Watkins Glen	(United States) Michael McCann	**(United States) Michael McCann**	(Canada) Travis Hill	(United States) Mark Pombo
7	R1	(Wisconsin) Road America	(United States) No. 3 McCann Racing	**(United States) No. 72 FCP Euro**	(United States) No. 27 McCann Racing	(United States) No. 69 X-Factor Racing
7	R1	(Wisconsin) Road America	(United States) Michael McCann	**(United States) Nate Vincent**	(United States) Christian Cole	(United States) Chris Haldeman
7	R2	(Wisconsin) Road America	(United States) No. 71 FCP Euro	**(Puerto Rico) No. 99 VGMC Racing**	(United States) No. 15 BSport Racing	(United Kingdom) No. 61 MINI JCW Team
7	R2	(Wisconsin) Road America	(United States) Michael Hurczyn	**(Puerto Rico) Victor Gonzalez**	(United States) Brian Putt	(United States) Mat Pombo
8	R1	(Nevada) Las Vegas	(United States) No. 12 Copeland Motorsports	**(United States) No. 12 Copeland Motorsports**	(United States) No. 27 McCann Racing	(United States) No. 69 X-Factor Racing
8	R1	(Nevada) Las Vegas	(United States) Mason Filippi	**(United States) Mason Filippi**	(United States) Christian Cole	(United States) Chris Haldeman
8	R2	(Nevada) Las Vegas	(United States) No. 12 Copeland Motorsports	**(United States) No. 12 Copeland Motorsports**	(United States) No. 18 EXR Team by Premat	(United Kingdom) No. 60 MINI JCW Team
8	R2	(Nevada) Las Vegas	(United States) Mason Filippi	**(United States) Mason Filippi**	(United States) Stephen Vajda	(United States) Nate Norenberg

=== TC ===
Round		Circuit	Pole position	Winning driver	Winning team
1	R1	(Texas) Austin	(United States) Jeff Ricca	(Denmark) Johan Schwartz	(United States) Rooster Hall Racing
1	R2	(Texas) Austin	(United States) Paul Terry	(United States) Jeff Ricca	(United States) GenRacer
2	R1	Virginia	(Denmark) Johan Schwartz	(Denmark) Johan Schwartz	(United States) Rooster Hall Racing
2	R2	Virginia	(United States) Chandler Hull	(Denmark) Johan Schwartz	(United States) Rooster Hall Racing
3	R1	(California) Sonoma	(Denmark) Johan Schwartz	(United States) Steve Streimer	(United States) Rooster Hall Racing
3	R2	(California) Sonoma	(United States) Cameron Evans	(United States) Cameron Evans	(United States) Bimmerworld Racing
4	R1	(Oregon) Portland	(Denmark) Johan Schwartz	(Denmark) Johan Schwartz	(United States) Rooster Hall Racing
4	R2	(Oregon) Portland	(United States) Toby Grahovec	(Denmark) Johan Schwartz	(United States) Rooster Hall Racing
5	R1	(New York (state)) Watkins Glen	(Denmark) Johan Schwartz	(United States) Paul Terry	(United States) Rearden Racing
5	R2	(New York (state)) Watkins Glen	(Denmark) Johan Schwartz	(Denmark) Johan Schwartz	(United States) Rooster Hall Racing
6	R1	(Wisconsin) Road America	(United States) Jeff Ricca	(United States) James Clay	(United States) Bimmerworld Racing
6	R2	(Wisconsin) Road America	(United States) James Clay	(Denmark) Johan Schwartz	(United States) Rooster Hall Racing
7	R1	(Nevada) Las Vegas	(Denmark) Johan Schwartz	(United States) Jeff Ricca	(United States) GenRacer
7	R2	(Nevada) Las Vegas	(United States) Jeff Ricca	(Denmark) Johan Schwartz	(United States) Rooster Hall Racing

== Championship standings ==
Scoring system

Championship points are awarded for the first ten position in each race. Entries are required to complete 75% of the winning car's race distance in order to be classified and earn points.

Position	1st	2nd	3rd	4th	5th	6th	7th	8th	9th	10th
Points	25	18	15	12	10	8	6	4	2	1

=== Drivers' championships ===
==== TCR/TCA ====
Pos	Driver	Team	AUS (United States)		STP‡ (United States)		VIR (United States)		SON (United States)		POR (United States)		WGL (United States)		ROA (United States)		LVG (United States)		Points
Pos	Driver	Team	RD1	RD2	RD1	RD2	RD1	RD2	RD1	RD2	RD1	RD2	RD1	RD2	RD1	RD2	RD1	RD2	Points
TCR
1	(United States) Michael Hurczyn	(United States) FCP Euro	2	3	1	2	2	2	2	3	3	1	3	2	2	2	7	4	285
2	(United States) Nate Vincent	(United States) FCP Euro	3	2	4	1	Ret	3	4	4	2	2	2	3	1	3	2	2	257
3	(United States) Mason Filippi	(United States) TFB	1	1															187
3	(United States) Mason Filippi	(United States) Copeland Motorsports							5	1	1	3	4	Ret			1	1	187
4	(United States) James Walker	(United States) Risi Competizione	6	4	2	13	11	7	3	5	12	5	6	4	4	4	Ret	DNS	169
5	(Puerto Rico) Victor Gonzalez	(Puerto Rico) VGMC Racing					3	4	1	2	4	6	5	8	3	1	Ret	Ret	153
6	(United States) Michael McCann Jr.	(United States) McCann Racing									5	4	1	1	6	13	3	3	122
7	(United States) Nelson Cheung	(United States) LAP Motorsports	9	9					9	12									36
8	(United States) Britt Casey Jr.	(United States) McCann Racing					DSQ	1											25
TCR DSG Cup
1	(United States) Brian Putt	(United States) eEuroparts.com ROWE Racing	5	6	3	3	5	6	6	6	6	7	10	9					301
1	(United States) Brian Putt	(United States) BSport Racing													Ret	5	6	6	301
2	(United States) Christian Cole	(United States) McCann Racing	8	10	7	5	4	5	7	8	8	8	9	7	5	9	4	7	271
3	(United States) Stephen Vajda	(United States) EXR Team by Premat							8	7	7	9	8	6			5	5	145
4	(United States) Michael McCann Jr.	(United States) McCann Racing	10	8	6	4	1	20											55
5	(Canada) Alain Lauziere	(Canada) Alphasonic Motorsport	4	5	6	7													68
6	(Canada) Travis Hill	(Canada) TWOth Autosport											7	5					50
7	(Canada) Nelson Chan	(Canada) Alphasonic Motorsport	7	7	8	8													48
8	(United States) Eddie Killeen	(Canada) TWOth Autosports	11	11	10	9							11	10					48
9	(United States) Jay Salinsky	(United States) RS Werkes			5	6													30
10	(United States) Todd Archer	(United States) RS Werkes	12	12															12
TCA
1	(United States) Tyler Maxson	(United States) Copeland Motorsports	15	Ret			7	9	10	9	11	12	13	12	12	18	11	10	206
2	(Canada) Nick Wittmer	(United States) TechSport Racing	13	13			6	8	21	13	9	13	Ret	17	8	7	17	Ret	202
3	(United States) Mark Pombo	(United Kingdom) MINI JCW Team	14	14			Ret	17	11	10	17	10	12	11	14	15	10	13	192
4	(United States) Chris Haldeman	(United States) X-Factor Racing	17	19			9	10	12	11	19	11	Ret	Ret	7	8	8	Ret	160
5	(United States) Taylor Hagler	(United States) X-Factor Racing	18	15			15	11	16	14	14	14	14	21	10	10	13	15	133
6	(United States) Nate Norenberg	(United Kingdom) MINI JCW Team	19	17			8	12	13	15	10	19	15	20	Ret	12	18	8	130
7	(United States) Tomas Mejia	(United Kingdom) MINI JCW Team											16	13	9	16	12	9	74
8	(United States) Cole Ciraulo	(United States) X-Factor Racing	26	21			12	19	15	16	13	15			13	17	15	14	70
9	(Canada) P.J. Groenke	(United States) TechSport Racing	16	20			10	11	Ret	20	Ret	21	17	14	16	14	Ret	16	62
10	(United States) Stephen Jeu	(United States) X-Factor Racing	25	Ret			17	Ret	17	Ret	Ret	16	18	19	11	11	16	17	50
11	(United States) Sally McNulty	(United States) #TEAMSALLY	27	26			16	14	19	18	15	20	21	15					29
12	(United States) Jose DaSilva	(United States) Ives Motorsports	21	16					14	19	Ret	DNS	20	Ret					27
13	(United States) Jenny Gannett	(United States) Ian Lacy Racing	23	22			14	13	20	17									17
14	(United States) Luis Perocarpi	(United Kingdom) MINI JCW Team											19	16					12
15	(United States) Ben Bettenhausen	(United States) TechSport Racing	29	23			19	Ret	18	Ret	16	17	DNQ	Ret					12
16	(United States) Robert Crocker	(United States) TechSport Racing	20	24			13	Ret	Ret	Ret	20	Ret							10
17	(United States) Damon Surzyshyn	(United States) TechSport Racing	22	25			18	15	23	Ret	18	18	22	WD	17	19	Ret	Ret	10
18	(United States) Danny Soufi	(United States) X-Factor Racing	24	18															8
19	(United States) Mike Ogren	(United States) TechSport Racing			12	11							23	18					4
20	(United States) Dinah Weisberg	(United States) Copeland Motorsports	28	Ret			20	16	22	21									2
Drivers ineligible to score points
	(United States) Mat Pombo	(United Kingdom) MINI JCW Team													Ret	6	9	18	
	(United States) Eric Powell	(United States) TechSport Racing			11	10													
	(Puerto Rico) Bryan Ortiz	(United States) Copeland Motorsports															Ret	11	
	(United States) Tyler Gonzalez	(United States) Bryan Herta Autosport with Curb Agajanian															14	12	
	(United States) Kevin Anderson	(United States) TechSport Racing			Ret	12													
	(United States) Dean Copeland	(United States) Copeland Motorsports													15	Ret			
Pos	Driver	Team	AUS (United States)		STP (United States)		VIR (United States)		SON (United States)		POR (United States)		WGL (United States)		ROA (United States)		LVG (United States)		Points

Notes

- ‡ — The St. Petersburg round was a non-championship event for TCA cars, so no points were awarded.

==== TC ====
Pos	Driver	Team	AUS (United States)		VIR (United States)		SON (United States)		POR (United States)		WGL (United States)		ROA (United States)		LVG (United States)		Points
Pos	Driver	Team	RD1	RD2	RD1	RD2	RD1	RD2	RD1	RD2	RD1	RD2	RD1	RD2	RD1	RD2	Points
1	(Denmark) Johan Schwartz	(United States) Rooster Hall Racing	1	3	1	1	DSQ	5	1	1	2	1	3	1	2	1	279
2	(United States) Toby Grahovec	(United States) Classic BMW	2	2	2	11	2	2	2	10	Ret	12	2	3	4	4	176
3	(United States) Chandler Hull	(United States) Bimmerworld Racing	12	14	4	2	8	4	7	3	7	8	5	7	3	3	127
4	(United States) Robert Nimkoff	(United States) AutoTechnic Racing	5	8	Ret	5	3	6	4	2	3	7	8	6	9	5	126
5	(United States) Jeff Ricca	(United States) GenRacer	3	1							6	6	4	5	1	2	126
6	(United States) Steve Stremier	(United States) Rooster Hall Racing	14	7	3	Ret	1	3	6	Ret	8	2	6	8	7	Ret	113
7	(United States) Cameron Evans	(United States) Bimmerworld Racing	8	11	8	4	5	1	5	6	9	5	Ret	9	6	9	101
8	(United States) Paul Terry	(United States) Rearden Racing	7	4	Ret	Ret			3	4	1	3	Ret	DNS			85
9	(United States) Tom Capizzi	(United States) AutoTechnic Racing	10	12	5	7	4	10	8	5	12	9	7	11	5	6	73
10	(United States) Joseph Federl	(United States) TechSport Racing	4	5	7	10			13	Ret	5	11	10	4	10	10	59
11	(United States) Moisey Uretsky	(United States) Murillo Racing	9	9	Ret	3	9	7	9	7							35
12	(United States) Jacob Ruud	(United States) Classic BMW									4	4					24
13	(United States) Zane Hodgen	(United States) Lone Star Racing	6	6													16
13	(United States) Marko Radisic	(United States) Classic BMW			6	6											16
14	(South Africa) Richard Zulman	(United States) Rooster Hall Racing	13	10	9	8	7	9									15
15	(United States) Shaun Webster	(United States) HARD Motorsport					6	Ret	10	8							13
17	(United States) Hanna Zellers	(United States) Dynamic Racing Solutions									11	14	13	13	8	7	10
18	(United States) Peter Atwater	(United States) NULITE	11	13					14	Ret			9	10			6
19	(United States) Mark Brummond	(United States) TechSport Racing					Ret	8	11	Ret	10	10					6
20	(United States) Greg Nitzkowski	(United States) Dynamic Racing Solutions	15	15			10	11	12	9	13	13	12	Ret			4
21	(United States) Shehan Chandrasoma	(United States) TechSport Racing			Ret	9											2
	(United States) John Allen	(United States) AutoTechnic Racing	16	17													0
	(United States) Bruce Wexler	(United States) Dynamic Racing Solutions	Ret	16													0
Drivers ineligible to score points
	(United States) James Clay	(United States) Copart/Bimmerworld Racing											1	2			
	(United States) Austen Smith	(United States) Dasboot Motorsports													Ret	8	
	(United States) John Kerr	(United States) NULITE											11	14			
	(United States) Breton Williams	(United States) Classic BMW											Ret	12			
Pos	Driver	Team	AUS (United States)		VIR (United States)		SON (United States)		POR (United States)		WGL (United States)		ROA (United States)		LVG (United States)		Points

=== Teams' championships ===
Only the highest finishing car per team scores points and all other cars entered by that team are invisible as far as scoring points concerned.

==== TCR/TCA ====
Pos	Team	Manufacturer	AUS (United States)		STP‡ (United States)		VIR (United States)		SON (United States)		POR (United States)		WGL (United States)		ROA (United States)		LVG (United States)		Points
Pos	Team	Manufacturer	RD1	RD2	RD1	RD2	RD1	RD2	RD1	RD2	RD1	RD2	RD1	RD2	RD1	RD2	RD1	RD2	Points
TCR
1	(United States) FCP Euro	Volkswagen	2	2	1	1	2	2	2	3	2	1	2	2	1	2	2	2	313
2	(United States) McCann Racing	Audi	8	8	6	4	1	1	7	8	5	4	1	1	5	9	3	3	236
3	(United States) Risi Competizione	Alfa Romeo	6	4	2	13	11	7	3	5	12	5	6	4	4	4	Ret	DNS	169
4	(Puerto Rico) VGMC Racing	Honda					3	4	1	2	4	6	5	8	3	1	Ret	Ret	161
5	(United States) Copeland Motorsports	Hyundai							5	1	1	3	4	Ret			1	1	145
6	(United States) eEuroparts.com ROWE Racing	Audi	5	6	3	3	5	6	6	6	6	7	10	9					127
7	(United States) EXR Team by Premat	Audi							8	7	7	9	8	6			5	5	68
8	(United States) TFB	Hyundai	1	1															50
9	(Canada) Alphasonic Motorsport	Audi	4	5	8	7													45
10	(Canada) TWOth Autosports	Audi	11	11	10	9							7	5					42
11	(United States) RS Werkes	Audi	12	12	5	6													28
12	(United States) LAP Motorsports	Honda	9	9					9	12									20
Teams ineligible to score points
	(United States) BSport Racing	Audi													Ret	5	6	6	
TCA
1	(United Kingdom) MINI JCW Team	Mini	14	14			8	12	11	10	10	10	12	11	9	6	9	8	275
2	(United States) TechSport Racing	Subaru	13	13	11	10	6	8	18	13	9	13	17	14	8	7	17	16	244
3	(United States) Copeland Motorsports	Mazda	15	Ret			7	9	10	9	11	12	13	12	12	18	11	10	224
4	(United States) X-Factor Racing	Honda	17	15			9	10	12	11	13	11	14	19	7	8	8	14	217
5	(United States) #TEAMSALLY	Honda	27	26			16	14	19	18	15	20	21	15					80
6	(United States) Ian Lacy Racing	Mazda	23	22			14	13	20	17									50
7	(United States) Ives Motorsport	Mazda	21	16					14	19			20	Ret					46
Team ineligible to score points
	(United States) Bryan Herta Autosport with Curb Agajanian	Hyundai															14	12	
Pos	Team	Manufacturer	AUS (United States)		STP (United States)		VIR (United States)		SON (United States)		POR (United States)		WGL (United States)		ROA (United States)		LVG (United States)		Points

Notes

- ‡ — The St. Petersburg round was a non-championship event for TCA cars, so no points were awarded.

==== TC ====
Pos	Team	Manufacturer	AUS (United States)		VIR (United States)		SON (United States)		POR (United States)		WGL (United States)		ROA (United States)		LVG (United States)		Points
Pos	Team	Manufacturer	RD1	RD2	RD1	RD2	RD1	RD2	RD1	RD2	RD1	RD2	RD1	RD2	RD1	RD2	Points
1	(United States) Rooster Hall Racing	BMW	1	3	1	1	1	3	1	1	2	1	3	1	2	1	306
2	(United States) Classic BMW	BMW	2	2	2	6	2	2	2	10	4	4	2	3	4	4	206
3	(United States) Copart / Bimmerworld Racing	BMW	8	11	4	2	5	1	5	3	7	5	1	2	3	3	192
4	(United States) AutoTechnic Racing	BMW	5	8	5	5	3	6	4	2	3	7	7	6	5	5	158
5	(United States) GenRacer	Hyundai	3	1							6	6	4	5	1	2	123
6	(United States) TechSport Racing	Nissan	4	5	7	10	Ret	8	11	Ret	5	11	10	4	10	10	96
7	(United States) Rearden Racing	Nissan	7	4	Ret	Ret			3	4	1	3					88
8	(United States) Murillo Racing	BMW	9	9	Ret	3	9	7	9	7							57
9	(United States) Dynamic Racing Solutions	BMW	15	15			10	11	12	9	11	14	12	13	8	7	54
10	(United States) HARD Motorsport	BMW					6	Ret	10	8							24
11	(United States) NULITE	BMW	11	13					14	Ret			9	10			17
12	(United States) Lone Star Racing	BMW	6	6													16
Teams ineligible to score points
	(United States) Dasboot Motorsports	BMW													Ret	8	
Pos	Team	Manufacturer	AUS (United States)		VIR (United States)		SON (United States)		POR (United States)		WGL (United States)		ROA (United States)		LVG (United States)		Points

=== Manufacturers' championships ===
Only the highest finishing car per manufacturer scores points and all other cars entered by that manufacturer are invisible as far as scoring points concerned.

==== TCR/TCA ====
Pos.	Manufacturer	Car	AUS (United States)		STP‡ (United States)		VIR (United States)		SON (United States)		POR (United States)		WGL (United States)		ROA (United States)		LVG (United States)		Points
Pos.	Manufacturer	Car	RD1	RD2	RD1	RD2	RD1	RD2	RD1	RD2	RD1	RD2	RD1	RD2	RD1	RD2	RD1	RD2	Points
TCR
1	(Germany) Volkswagen	Golf GTI TCR	2	2	1	1	2	2	2	3	2	1	2	2	1	2	2	2	351
2	(Germany) Audi	RS3 LMS TCR	4	5	3	3	1	1	6	6	5	4	1	1	5	5	3	3	301
3	(Japan) Honda	Civic Type R TCR (FK8)	9	9			3	4	1	2	4	6	5	8	3	1	Ret	Ret	216
Manufacturers ineligible to score TCR class points
	(South Korea) Hyundai	Veloster N TCR	1	1					5	1	1	3	4	Ret			1	1	
	(Italy) Alfa Romeo	Giulietta TCR	6	4	2	13	11	7	3	5	12	5	6	4	4	4	Ret	DNS	
TCA
1	(United Kingdom) Mini	Cooper	14	14			8	12	11	10	10	10	12	11	9	6	9	8	295
2	(Japan) Subaru	BRZ tS	13	13	11	10	6	8	18	13	9	13	17	14	8	7	17	16	269
3	(Japan) Honda	Civic Si	17	15			9	10	12	11	13	11	14	15	7	8	8	14	248
Manufacturers ineligible to score TCA class points
	(Japan) Mazda	Global MX-5 Cup	15	22			7	9	10	9	11	12	13	12	12	18	11	10	
	(South Korea) Hyundai	Veloster Turbo R-Spec															14	12	
Pos.	Manufacturer	Car	AUS (United States)		STP‡ (United States)		VIR (United States)		SON (United States)		POR (United States)		WGL (United States)		ROA (United States)		LVG (United States)		Points

Notes

- ‡ — The St. Petersburg round was a non-championship event for TCA cars, so no points were awarded.

==== TC ====
Pos.	Manufacturer	Car	AUS (United States)		VIR (United States)		SON (United States)		POR (United States)		WGL (United States)		ROA (United States)		LVG (United States)		Points
Pos.	Manufacturer	Car	RD1	RD2	RD1	RD2	RD1	RD2	RD1	RD2	RD1	RD2	RD1	RD2	RD1	RD2	Points
1	(Germany) BMW	M235i Racing; M240i Racing	1	2	1	1	1	1	1	1	2	1	1	1	2	1	350
Manufacturer ineligible to score TC class points
	(South Korea) Hyundai	Genesis Coupe	3	1							6	6	4	5	1	2	
	(Japan) Nissan	370Z	4	4	7	10	Ret	8	3	4	1	3	10	4	10	10	
Pos.	Manufacturer	Car	AUS (United States)		VIR (United States)		SON (United States)		POR (United States)		WGL (United States)		ROA (United States)		LVG (United States)		Points
