= Gradient Racing =

American sports car racing team

(United States) Gradient Racing
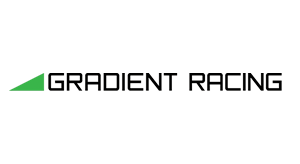
- Founded: 2018
- Founder(s): Andris Laivins (owner)
- Base: Austin, Texas, United States
- Team principal(s): Andris Laivins
- Current series: IMSA SportsCar Championship
- Former series: GT World Challenge America
- Current drivers: IMSA SportsCar Championship: 66. (United Kingdom) Till Bechtolsheimer (Colombia) Tatiana Calderón (United States) Joey Hand (United Kingdom) Harry Tincknell
- Noted drivers: (United States) Sheena Monk (United Kingdom) Stevan McAleer (Germany) Mario Farnbacher (United States) Marc Miller
- Website: https://www.gradientracing.com/

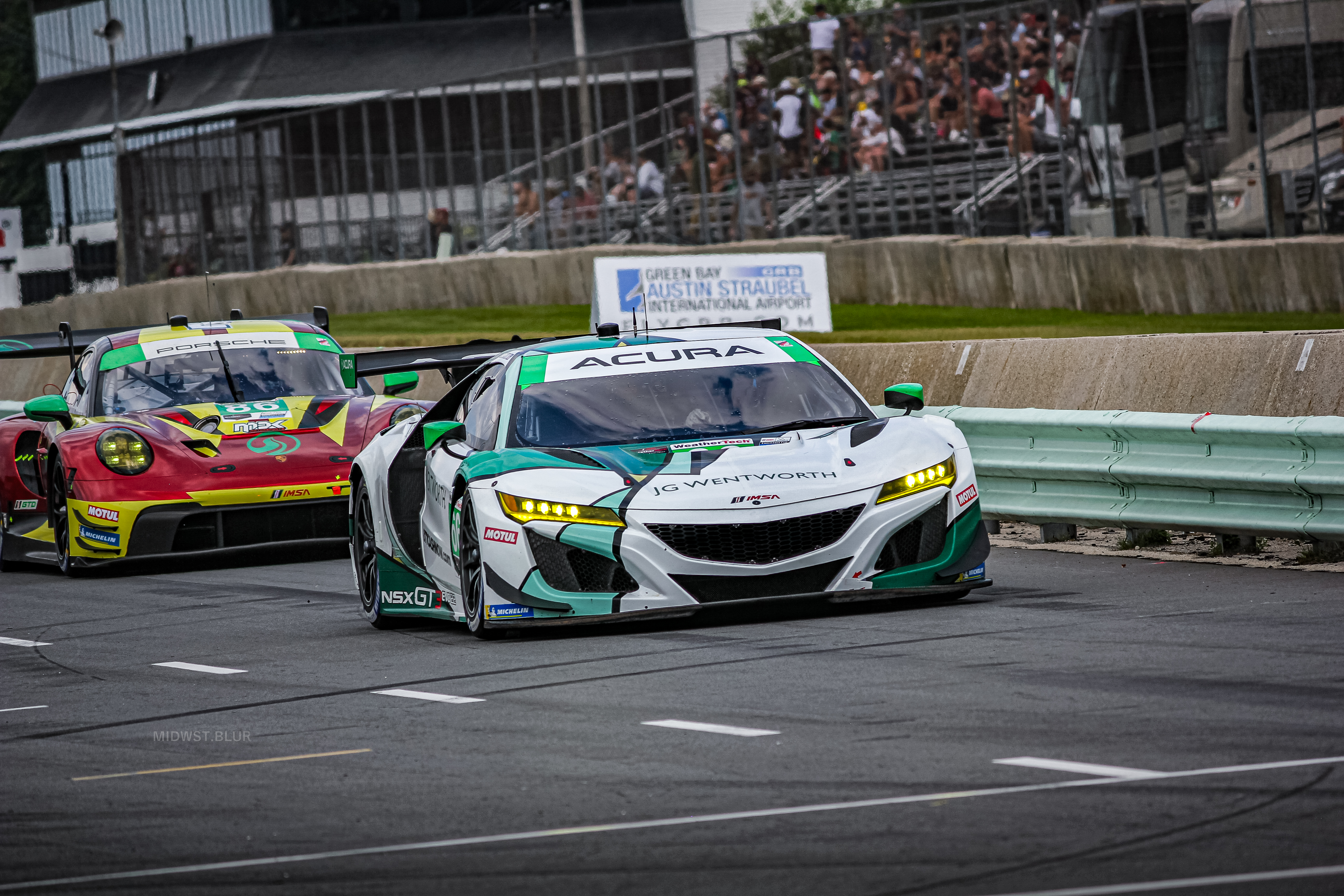
Gradient Racing Acura NSX GT3 Evo22 at the 2024 IMSA SportsCar Weekend

Gradient Racing is an American sports car racing team that currently competes in the GTD class of the IMSA SportsCar Championship. The team was founded in 2018 by Andris Laivins.

== History ==
Gradient Racing was founded at the end of 2018 by former CJ Wilson Racing team manager Andris Laivins. The team formed an alliance with Acura and acquired an Acura NSX GT3 chassis. They would make their competitive debut in the 2019 Blancpain GT World Challenge America.

=== GT World Challenge America ===
==== 2019 ====
Gradient Racing made their racing debut in the 2019 Blancpain GT World Challenge America fielding an Acura NSX GT3. The team signed Till Bechtolsheimer full-time along with Ryan Eversley. Eversley would be replaced by Marc Miller after the second round. Trent Hindman replaced Miller for the sixth round at Road America. The team finished 4th in the Pro-Am Cup at seasons end.

=== IMSA SportsCar Championship ===
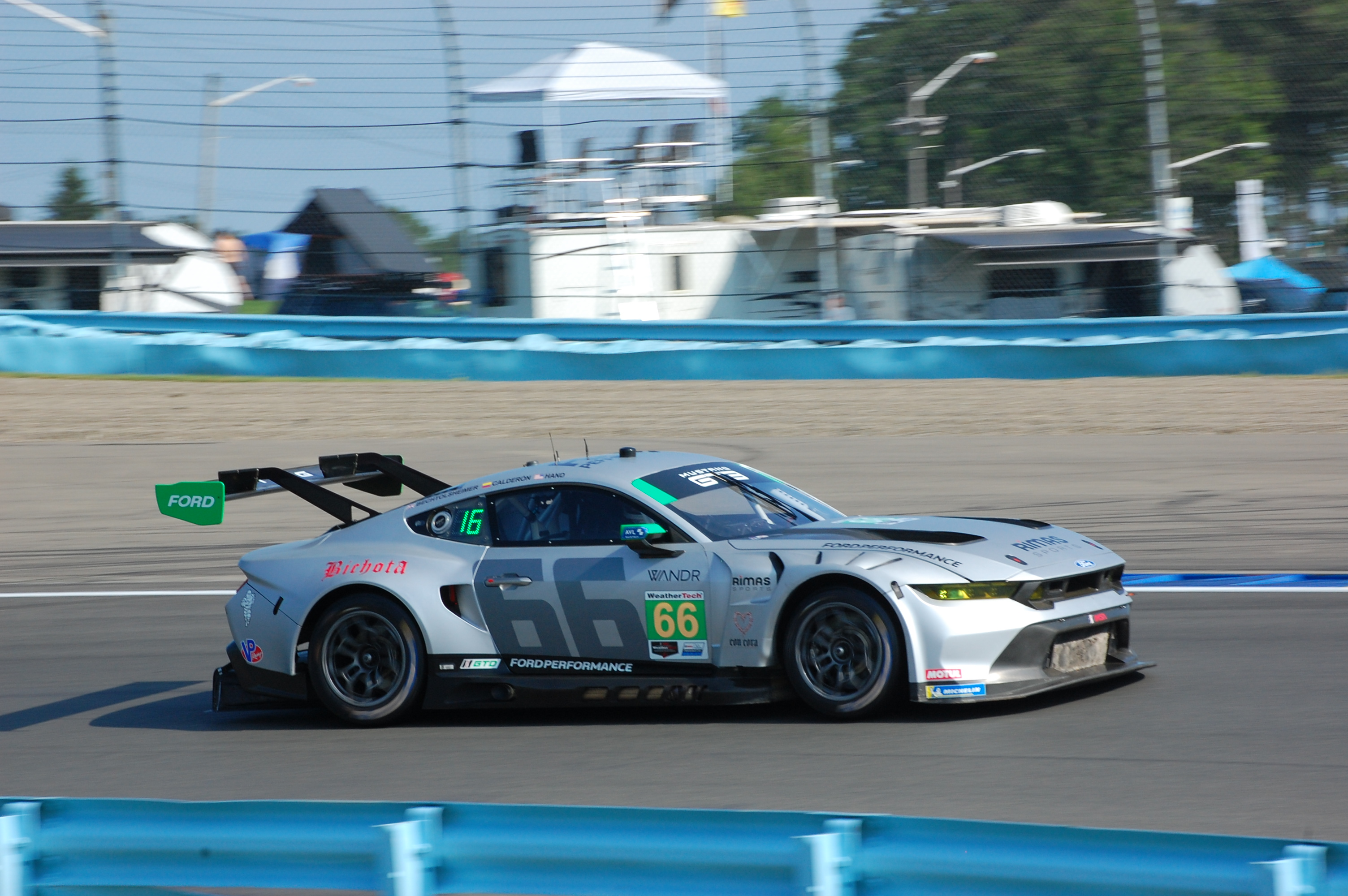
Gradient Racing Ford Mustang GT3 at the 2025 Sahlen's Six Hours of The Glen

==== 2020 ====
For 2020, the team moved from GT World Challenge America to the IMSA SportsCar Championship fielding an Acura NSX GT3 in the GTD class. They would only compete in the WeatherTech Sprint Cup rounds with drivers Till Bechtolsheimer and Marc Miller. Due to the COVID-19 pandemic, the team would in fact race at the Daytona International Raceway in the 2 hour 40 minute sprint race. They would have a best result of 7th at Sebring and finished 14th in the GTD standings.

==== 2021 ====
The team would return to the series for the 2021 IMSA SportsCar Championship once again fielding an Acura NSX GT3 in the WeatherTech Sprint Cup rounds. The team resigned Till Bechtolsheimer and Marc Miller. At the 2021 Detroit Sports Car Classic, the team got their first podium in the championship finishing third. Mario Farnbacher replaced an injured Marc Miller at the Virginia International Raceway. The team finished 13th in the GTD standings.

==== 2022 ====
Gradient Racing competed in the championship for a third consecutive season in 2022. This season they would compete in the Michelin Endurance Cup rounds. The team resigned Till Bechtolsheimer alongside Mario Farnbacher and Kyffin Simpson. Marc Miller would join the team in the rounds 1 and 3 at Daytona and Long Beach respectively. The team would get their first podium of the season finishing second at round 3 in Long Beach. In the season ending Petit Le Mans, the team had their qualifying times disallowed, resulting in them starting last on the GTD grid. In the race, the team made their way up the field and eventually overtook race leader Jordan Pepper in the No. 70 Inception Racing McLaren in the closing minutes of the race. Moments later a full course caution was displayed and the Farnbacher would maintain the lead. The race would end under caution and the team would get their first win as an organization.

== Racing record ==
=== Complete IMSA SportsCar Championship results ===
(key) (Races in bold indicate pole position; races in italics indicate fastest lap)

| Year | Entrant | Class | No | Chassis | Engine | Drivers | 1 | 2 | 3 | 4 | 5 | 6 | 7 | 8 | 9 | 10 | 11 | 12 | Pos. | Pts |
|---|---|---|---|---|---|---|---|---|---|---|---|---|---|---|---|---|---|---|---|---|
| 2020 | (United States) Gradient Racing | GTD | 22 | Acura NSX GT3 Evo | Acura 3.5 L Turbo V6 | (United Kingdom) Till Bechtolsheimer (United States) Marc Miller | DAY; 1 | DAY; 2; 10 | SEB; 1; 7 | ELK; 11 | VIR; 10 | ATL; 1 | MOH; 9 | CLT; 12 | ATL; 2 | LGA; 12 | SEB; 2 | | 14th | 122 |
| 2021 | (United States) Gradient Racing | GTD | 66 | Acura NSX GT3 EVo | Acura 3.5 L Turbo V6 | (United Kingdom) Till Bechtolsheimer (Germany) Mario Farnbacher (United States) Marc Miller | DAY | SEB | MOH | BEL; 8 | WGL; 1; 3 | WGL; 2 | LIM; 6 | ELK; 11 | LGA; 9 | LBH; 11 | VIR; 8 | ATL; 15 | 13th | 1365 |
| 2022 | (United States) Gradient Racing | GTD | 66 | Acura NSX GT3 Evo22 | Acura 3.5 L Turbo V6 | (United Kingdom) Till Bechtolsheimer (Germany) Mario Farnbacher (United States) Marc Miller (Barbados) Kyffin Simpson | DAY; 16 | SEB; 11 | LBH; 2 | LGA | MOH | BEL | WGL; 9 | MOS | LIM | ELK | VIR | ATL; 1 | 16th | 1003 |
| 2023 | (United States) Gradient Racing | GTD | 66 | Acura NSX GT3 Evo22 | Acura JNC1 3.5L Turbo V6 | (Germany) Mario Farnbacher (United Kingdom) Katherine Legge (United States) Marc Miller (United States) Sheena Monk | DAY; 4 | SEB; 12 | LBH; 9 | LGA; 13 | WGL; 5 | MOS; 11 | LIM; 6 | ELK; 10 | VIR; 10 | IMS; 13 | ATL; 15 | | 11th | 2552 |
| 2024 | (United States) Gradient Racing | GTD | 66 | Acura NSX GT3 Evo22 | Acura JNC1 3.5L Turbo V6 | (Colombia) Tatiana Calderón (United Kingdom) Katherine Legge (United Kingdom) Stevan McAleer (United States) Sheena Monk | DAY; 19 | SEB; 17 | LBH; 4 | LGA; 12 | WGL; 13 | MOS; 7 | ELK; 3 | VIR; 12 | IMS; 16 | ATL; 12 | | | 11th | 2175 |
| 2025 | (United States) Gradient Racing | GTD | 66 | Ford Mustang GT3 | Ford Coyote 5.4 L V8 | (United Kingdom) Till Bechtolsheimer (Colombia) Tatiana Calderón (United States) Joey Hand (United Kingdom) Harry Tincknell | DAY; 17 | SEB; 13 | LBH; 10 | LGA; 14 | WGL; 6 | MOS; 12 | ELK; 12 | VIR; 5 | IMS; 10 | ATL; 17 | | | 13th | 2111 |

* Season still in progress.
