= Mason Filippi =

American racing driver (born 1998)

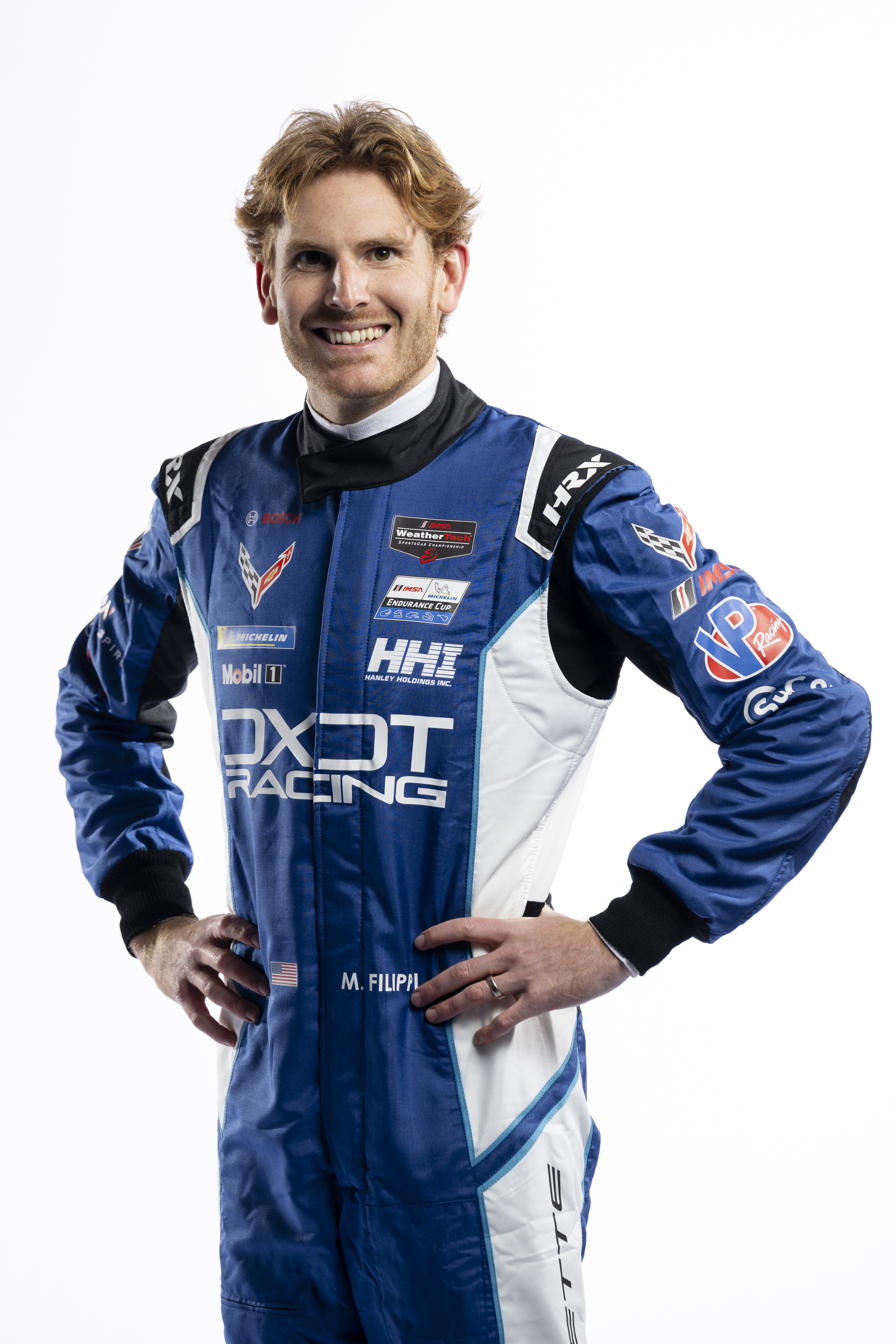
- Mason Filippi in DXDT Racing uniform
- Nationality: (United States) American
- Born: April 23, 1998 (age 28) Pleasanton, California, U.S.

Michelin Pilot Challenge career
- Debut season: 2019
- Current team: DXDT Racing, Bryan Herta Autosport
- Categorisation: FIA Silver
- Former teams: Bryan Herta Autosport (with Curb-Agajanian)
- Starts: 20
- Wins: 3
- Podiums: 6
- Fastest laps: 1
- Best finish: 2nd in 2019
- Finished last season: 3rd (2020)

Previous series
- 2016 2016–2018 2019: Global MX-5 Cup; Pirelli World Challenge; TC America Series

NASCAR O'Reilly Auto Parts Series career
- 1 race run over 1 year
- 2022 position: 101st
- Best finish: 101st (2022)
- First race: 2022 Pacific Office Automation 147 (Portland)
Wins	Top tens	Poles
0	0	0

NASCAR FedEx Freight Truck Series career
- 2 races run over 2 years
- 2023 position: 67th
- Best finish: 67th (2023)
- First race: 2022 O'Reilly Auto Parts 150 (Mid-Ohio)
- Last race: 2023 XPEL 225 (Austin)
Wins	Top tens	Poles
0	0	0
- Statistics up to date as of November 5, 2022.

Mason Filippi (born April 23, 1998) is an American auto racing driver who competes in the GTD class of the IMSA WeatherTech SportsCar Championsip for DXDT Racing and in the TCR class of the Michelin Pilot Challenge for Bryan Herta Autosport. Filippi placed 1st in the TCR class in the 2024 24 Hours of Nürburgring and contributed to Bryan Herta Autosport winning the 2025 Michelin Pilot Challenge Team Championship. He previously raced for Bryan Herta Autosport, finishing the Michelin Pilot Challenge in second place in 2019 and third in 2020. Filippi also piloted touring cars in the TC America Series and the Pirelli World Challenge from 2017 to 2019, finishing in the top five of the standings each season. Prior to racing touring cars, he drove Spec Miatas, competing in the Global MX-5 Cup and the Teen Mazda Challenge and winning the 25 Hours of Thunderhill race in 2015 and 2016.

== Early life and education ==
Mason Filippi was born on April 23, 1998. He grew up in Alamo, California and attended high school at Berean Christian High School in nearby Walnut Creek. He studied at Diablo Valley College and Arizona State University.

Filippi was gifted his first dirt bike at the age of four, his first go-kart at the age of eleven, and his first Mazda Miata at the age of fourteen. He earned his provisional license at the age of fifteen after attending the Sports Car Club of America (SCCA) driver's school.

== Career ==
After receiving his full competition license from the SCCA, Filippi began entering races in the San Francisco region (SFR) and was named the 2014 SCCA SFR Rookie of the Year. In 2015, he won the National Auto Sport Association's Teen Mazda Challenge West Coast title. His victory in that Spec Miata series led to his appearance as one of nine finalists in the 2015 Mazda Road to 24 Shootout. Later in 2015, Filippi was on the Grip Racing team that won the 25 Hours of Thunderhill race in the E1 class. In 2016, he and his team repeated as winners of that race in the E1 class.

=== Global MX-5 Cup ===
Filippi joined the Winding Road team for the 2016 season of the Global MX-5 Cup. He drove the No. 2 car in the Spec Miata series, competing in six out of the twelve races and finishing in 34th place in the standings with 125 overall points. His best finish in a race was fourteenth place, which he achieved at both the WeatherTech Raceway Laguna Seca and Watkins Glen International.

=== Pirelli World Challenge/TC America Series ===
Filippi first entered the Pirelli World Challenge in 2016, racing in the final four events of the season in the TCA class for Atlanta Motorsports Group. He finished in the top ten in each of his races with his highest finish (fifth) coming at Laguna Seca. He placed fourteenth in the overall standings with 296 points for the 2016 season.

For the 2017 Pirelli World Challenge, Filippi joined Winding Road Team TFB and began competing in the TC class. He drove the number 12 BMW M235iR. That year, he competed in all twelve races, earning his first Pirelli World Challenge victory at Canadian Tire Motorsport Park in round four. He also achieved the fastest lap in that race. Including that event, Filippi finished in the top ten in nine races that season. He finished fifth in the overall standings with 173 points.

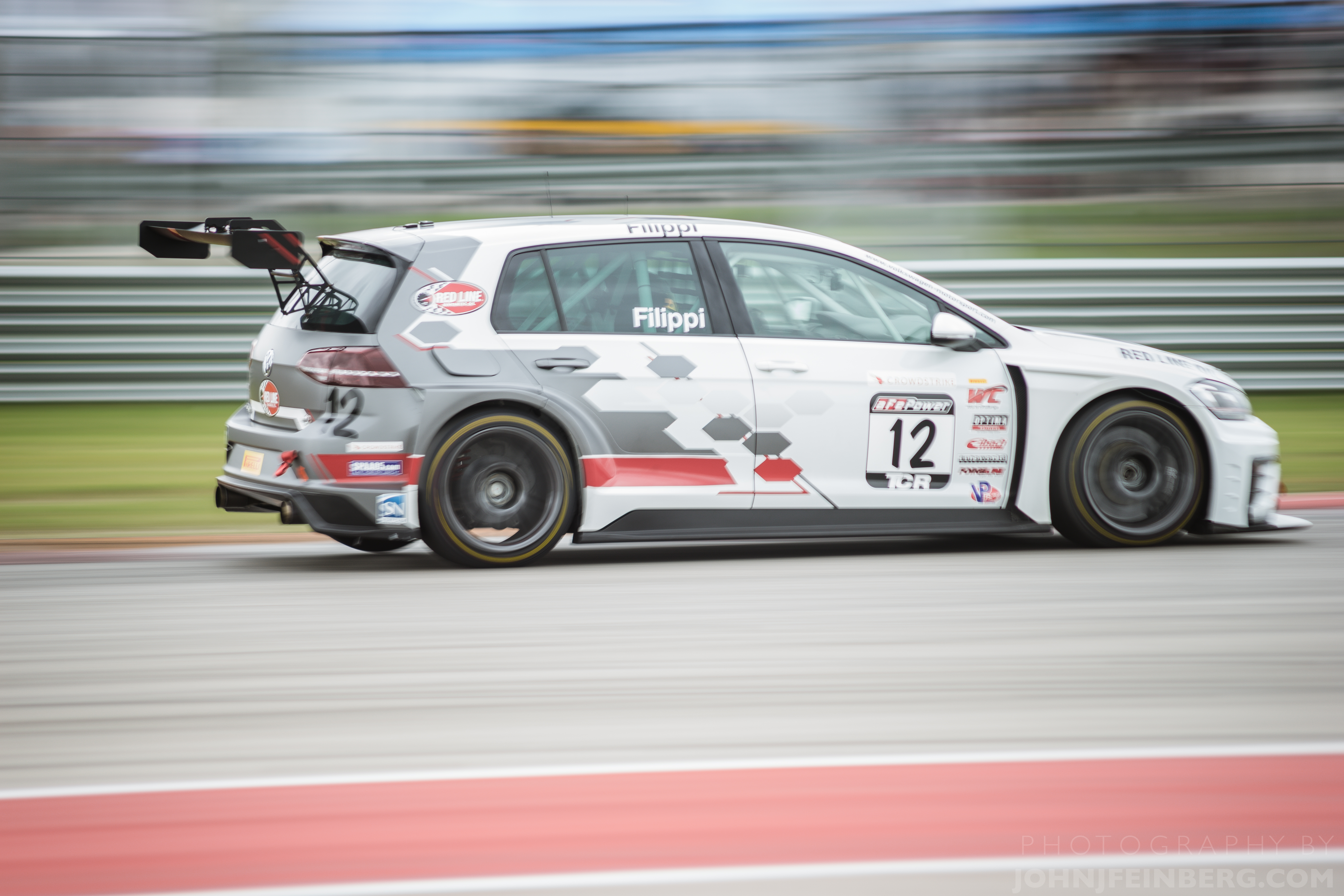
The No. 12 Golf GTi TCR that Filippi drove during the Grand Prix of Texas at Circuit of the Americas

Filippi remained with Team TFB for the 2018 Pirelli World Challenge, and he also joined the TCR class racing in the No. 12 Volkswagen Golf GTi TCR. In August 2018, however, Filippi announced that he would be joining RealTime Racing for the final four races of the season, opting to drive the No. 44 Honda Civic Type R TCR. He had his best finishes of the season in that car, coming in third and second respectively at the final two races of the season at Watkins Glen. He finished fourth in the overall standings with 183 points.

For the 2019 season, the Pirelli World Challenge was rebranded as the TC America Series. Filippi returned to Team TFB at the beginning of the season, driving the number 12 Hyundai Veloster N TCR in the TCR class. At the season's first two races at the Circuit of the Americas in Austin, Texas, Filippi came in first, achieving the initial race's fastest lap, as well. Because of scheduling conflicts with the Michelin Pilot Challenge season, Filippi did not compete in the next four races on the TC America Series schedule. In May 2019, it was announced that he would return to the TC America Series as a member of the Copeland Motorsports team. He continued driving the Hyundai Veloster N TCR and went on to win four additional races that season. With 187 points, he finished third in the overall standings despite competing in only ten of the sixteen races that year.

=== IMSA Michelin Pilot Challenge ===
In January 2019, it was announced that Filippi would join Bryan Herta Autosport (with Curb-Agajanian) to compete in the TCR class of the 2019 Michelin Pilot Challenge in the No. 21 Hyundai Veloster N TCR with co-driver Harry Gottsacker. Both Filippi and Gottsacker were rookies on the series. The duo appeared in the top ten in each of the ten races that season and finished on the podium in three races, including first place at Road America in Elkhart Lake, Wisconsin. That victory came after the No. 89 car, which finished ahead of Filippi, was disqualified for failing to give one of its drivers the minimum drive-time. Filippi and Gottsacker finished in second place in the overall standings with 268 points.

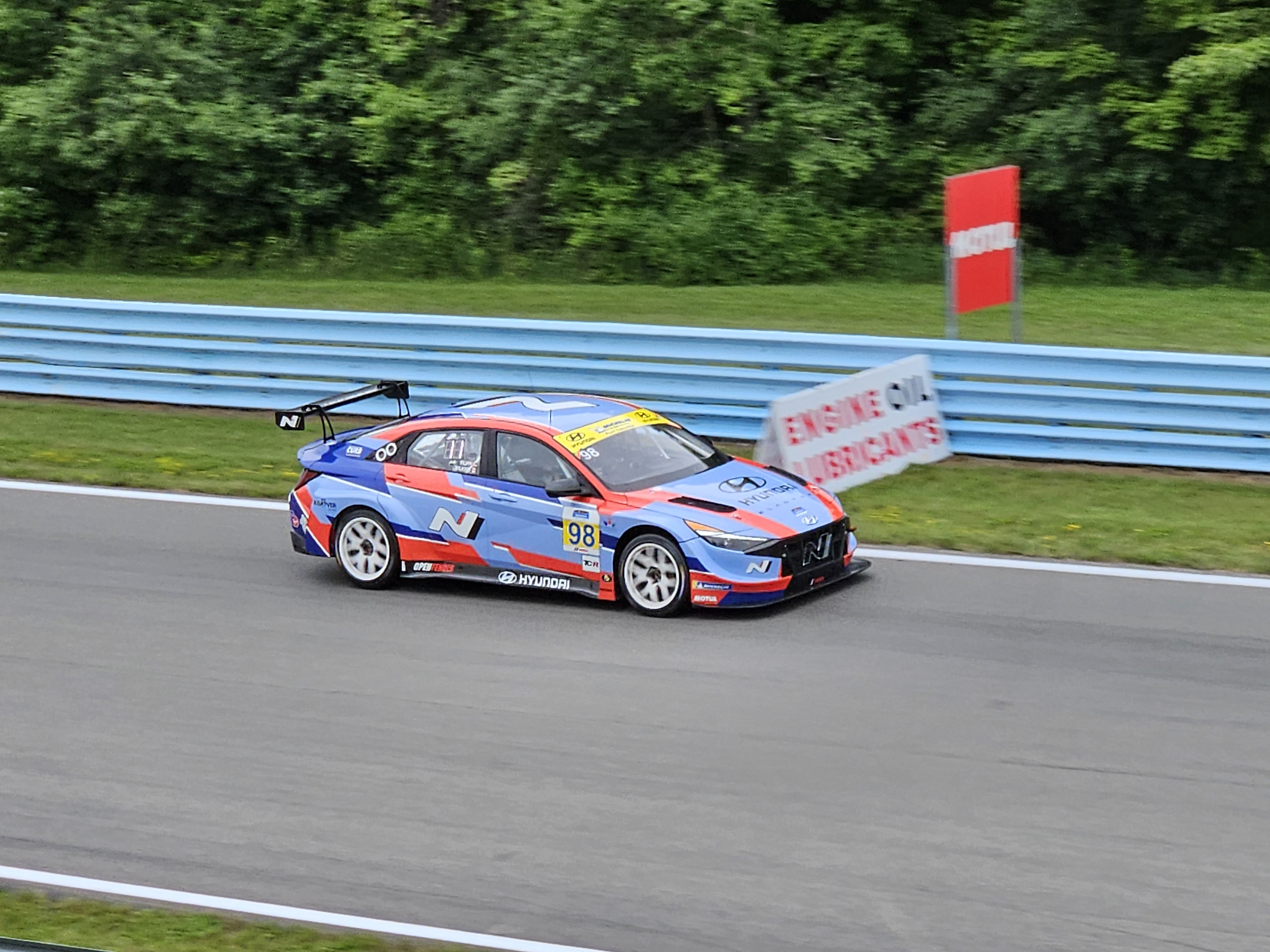
Filippi and co-driver Mark Wilkins finished runner up in the TCR Drivers' Championship of the 2023 Michelin Pilot Challenge

For the 2020 Michelin Pilot Challenge season, it was announced that Filippi would stay with Bryan Herta Autosport (with Curb-Agajanian) but would become Michael Lewis' co-driver in the No. 98 Hyundai Veloster N TCR. The pair came in fourth in the season's first race at the Daytona International Speedway. The next race in the series was scheduled for March 2020, but was postponed due to the COVID-19 pandemic. In the meantime, Filippi competed in the IMSA iRacing Pro Series before the Michelin Pilot Challenge returned in July 2020. Filippi and Lewis secured two victories in the 2020 season, one at Virginia International Raceway and the other at Road Atlanta. They finished in third place overall with 273 points.

For the 2021 Michelin Pilot Challenge season, Filippi was part of the Hyundai USA/ Bryan Herta Autosport Team Driver to drive for Copeland Motorsports in the TCR class. He would drive the No. 51 Hyundai Veloster N TCR with co-driver AJ Muss.

=== IMSA WeatherTech SportsCar Championship ===
In January 2026, DXDT Racing announced that Filippi would be joining the team's driver lineup for the entirety of the 2026 season. Filippi's co-drivers for the endurance races were Salih Yoluç, Charlie Eastwood, with IndyCar ace Scott McLaughlin joining the lineup for the season opening Rolex 24 Hours of Daytona. Filippi would be joined by former Bryan Herta Autosport teammate Robert Wickens for the sprint races.

=== NASCAR ===
On May 25, 2022, DGM Racing announced that Filippi would make his Xfinity Series and NASCAR debut in the race at Portland in the team's No. 91 car. He was also scheduled to make his NASCAR Camping World Truck Series debut at Sonoma with G2G Racing however due to him not being able to learn the truck quick enough, he was switched out with Stefan Parsons. He would later make his debut at Mid-Ohio.

== Racing record ==
=== Career summary ===
Season	Series	Team	Races	Wins	Poles	F/Laps	Podiums	Points	Position
2015	25 Hours of Thunderhill	Grip Racing	1	1	0	0	1	N/A	**1st**
2016	Global MX-5 Cup	Winding Road	6	0	0	0	0	125	34th
2016	Pirelli World Challenge - TCA	Atlanta Motorsport Group	4	0	0	0	0	296	14th
2016	25 Hours of Thunderhill	Grip Racing	1	1	0	0	1	N/A	**1st**
2017	Pirelli World Challenge - TC	Winding Road Team TFB	12	1	0	1	1	173	5th
2018	Pirelli World Challenge - TCR	Team TFB; RealTime Racing	12	0	0	0	2	183	4th
2019	FIA Motorsport Games Touring Car Cup	Team USA	2	0	0	0	0	2	18th
2019	TC America Series - TCR	Team TFB; Copeland Motorsports	10	6	5	4	7	187	**3rd**
2019	Michelin Pilot Challenge - TCR	Bryan Herta Autosport with Curb-Agajanian	10	1	0	0	3	268	**2nd**
2020	Michelin Pilot Challenge - TCR	Bryan Herta Autosport with Curb-Agajanian	10	2	0	1	3	273	**3rd**
2021	Michelin Pilot Challenge - TCR	Copeland Motorsports	10	0	0	0	0	1960	13th
2022	Michelin Pilot Challenge - TCR	Bryan Herta Autosport with Curb-Agajanian	10	0	4	0	2	2340	8th
2022	NASCAR Xfinity Series	DGM Racing	1	0	0	0	0	0	NC†
2022	NASCAR Camping World Truck Series	G2G Racing	1	0	0	0	0	1	85th
2023	IMSA SportsCar Championship - LMP3	JDC-Miller Motorsports	1	0	0	0	0	0	NC
2023	Michelin Pilot Challenge - TCR	Bryan Herta Autosport with Curb-Agajanian	10	3	0	0	8	2950	**2nd**
2023	24 Hours of Nürburgring - TCR	Hyundai Motorsport N	1	0	0	0	1	N/A	**2nd**
2024	Michelin Pilot Challenge - TCR	Bryan Herta Autosport with Curb-Agajanian	10	2	0	1	5	2890	**2nd**
2024	Nürburgring Langstrecken-Serie - TCR	Hyundai Motorsport N							
2024	24 Hours of Nürburgring - TCR	Hyundai Motorsport N							
2025	Michelin Pilot Challenge - TCR	Bryan Herta Autosport with Curb-Agajanian							
2025	Nürburgring Langstrecken-Serie - TCR	Hyundai Motorsport N							
2025	IMSA SportsCar Championship - GTD	Gradient Racing	2	0	0	0	0	382	53rd
2026	IMSA SportsCar Championship - GTD	DXDT Racing	9	0	1	0	1	2061	12th
2026	Michelin Pilot Challenge - TCR	Bryan Herta Autosport with PR1/Mathiasen							
2026	GT4 America Series - Pro-Am	Bryan Herta Autosport with Curb-Agajanian							

=== Complete 25 Hours of Thunderhill results ===
Year	Team	Co-Drivers	Car	Class	Laps	Class Pos.
2015	Grip Racing	Chuck Hurley; Mark Drennan; Eric Sidebotham; Andrew Newell	BMW 330i	E1	615	**1st**
2016	Grip Racing	Chuck Hurley; Mark Drennan; Eric Sidebotham; Andrew Newell	BMW 330i	E1	677	**1st**

=== Complete Global MX-5 Cup results ===
(key) (Races in bold indicate pole position) (Races in italics indicate fastest lap)

Year	Team	1	2	3	4	5	6	7	8	9	10	11	12	Pos	Points
2016	Winding Road	LAG; 1; 14	LAG; 2; 32	WGL; 1; 14	WGL; 2; 31	ROA; 1 DNP	ROA; 2 DNP	MOS; 1; 17	MOS; 2; 29	VIR; 1 DNP	VIR; 2 DNP	ATL; 1 DNP	ATL; 1 DNP	34th	125

=== Complete Pirelli World Challenge results ===
(key) (Races in bold indicate pole position) (Races in italics indicate fastest lap)

Year	Team	Car	Class	1	2	3	4	5	6	7	8	9	10	11	12	Pos	Points
2016	Atlanta Motorsports Group	Mazda MX-5	TCA	AUS; 1 DNP	AUS; 2 DNP	MOS; 1 DNP	MOS; 2 DNP	LIM; 1 DNP	LIM; 2 DNP	ROA; 1 DNP	ROA; 2 DNP	UTA; 1; 8	UTA; 2; 7	LAG; 1; 6	LAG; 2; 5	14th	296
2017	Winding Road Team TFB	BMW M235iR	TC	VIR; 1; 16	VIR; 2; 14	MOS; 1; 13	MOS; 2; 1	LIM; 1; 5	LIM; 2; 6	UTA; 1; 8	UTA; 2; 5	AUS; 1; 6	AUS; 2; 5	LAG; 1; 6	LAG; 2; 4	5th	173
2018	Team TFB (races 1–8) RealTime Racing (races 9–12)	Volkswagen Golf GTi TCR (races 1–8) Honda Civic Type R TCR (races 9–12)	TCR	AUS; 1; 9	AUS; 2; 7	VIR; 1; 4	VIR; 2; 13	LIM; 1; 5	LIM; 2; 5	POR; 1; 6	POR; 2; 10	UTA; 1; 10	UTA; 2; 6	LAG; 1; 3	LAG; 2; 2	4th	183

=== Complete TC America Series results ===
(key) (Races in bold indicate pole position) (Races in italics indicate fastest lap)

Year	Team	Car	Class	1	2	3	4	5	6	7	8	9	10	11	12	13	14	15	16	Pos	Points
2019	Team TFB (races 1–2) Copeland Motorsports (races 7–12, 15–16)	Hyundai Veloster N TCR	TCR	AUS; 1; 1	**AUS**; **2**; 1	STP; 1 DNP	STP; 2 DNP	VIR; 1 DNP	VIR; 2 DNP	**SON**; **1**; 5	**SON**; **2**; 1	**POR**; **1**; 1	POR; 2; 3	WGL; 1; 4	WGL; 2 Ret	ROA; 1 DNP	ROA; 2 DNP	**LVG**; **1**; 1	**LVG**; **2**; 1	3rd	187

=== Complete WeatherTech SportsCar Championship results ===
(key) (Races in bold indicate pole position; races in italics indicate fastest lap)

Year	Entrant	Class	Make	Engine	1	2	3	4	5	6	7	8	9	10	Rank	Points
2023	JDC-Miller MotorSports	LMP3	Duqueine M30 - D08	Nissan VK56DE 5.6 L V8	DAY; 5†	SEB	WGL	MOS	ELK	IMS	PET				NC†	0†
2025	Gradient Racing	GTD	Ford Mustang GT3	Ford Coyote 5.4 L V8	DAY	SEB	LBH	LGA	WGL	MOS	ELK	VIR	IMS; 10	PET; 17	53rd	382
2026	DXDT Racing	GTD	Chevrolet Corvette Z06 GT3.R	Chevrolet LT6.R 5.5 L V8	DAY; 17	SEB; 9	**LBH**; 6	LGA	WGL; 11	MOS; 13	ELK; 14	VIR; 8	IMS; 12	PET; 3	12th	2061

^{†} Points only counted towards the Michelin Endurance Cup, and not the overall LMP3 Championship.

=== Complete Michelin Pilot Challenge results ===
(key) (Races in bold indicate pole position) (Races in italics indicate fastest lap)

Year	Team	Co-driver	Car	Class	1	2	3	4	5	6	7	8	9	10	Pos	Points
2019	Bryan Herta Autosport (with Curb-Agajanian)	Harry Gottsacker	Hyundai Veloster N TCR	TCR	DAY; 5	SEB; 4	MOH; 7	WGL; 8	MOS; 10	LIM; 3	ROA; 1	VIR; 2	LAG; 10	ATL; 4	2nd	268
2020	Bryan Herta Autosport (with Curb-Agajanian)	Michael Lewis	Hyundai Veloster N TCR	TCR	DAY; 4	SEB; 1; 2	ROA; 11	VIR; 1	ATL; 1; 5	MOH; 1; 5	MOH; 2; 4	ATL; 2; 1	LAG; 8	SEB; 2; 11	3rd	273

=== NASCAR ===
(key) (Bold – Pole position awarded by qualifying time. Italics – Pole position earned by points standings or practice time. * – Most laps led.)

==== Xfinity Series ====
NASCAR Xfinity Series results
Year	Team	No.	Make	1	2	3	4	5	6	7	8	9	10	11	12	13	14	15	16	17	18	19	20	21	22	23	24	25	26	27	28	29	30	31	32	33	NXSC	Pts	Ref
2022	DGM Racing	91	Chevy	DAY	CAL	LVS	PHO	ATL	COA	RCH	MAR	TAL	DOV	DAR	TEX	CLT	POR; 25	NSH	ROA	ATL	NHA	POC															101st	0^{1}	
2022	DGM Racing	90	Chevy																				IND; DNQ	MCH	GLN	DAY	DAR	KAN	BRI	TEX	TAL	CLT	LVS	HOM	MAR	PHO	101st	0^{1}	
2023	MBM Motorsports	66	Ford	DAY	CAL	LVS	PHO	ATL	COA	RCH	MAR	TAL	DOV	DAR	CLT	PIR	SON; DNQ	NSH	CSC	ATL	NHA	POC	ROA	MCH	IRC	GLN	DAY	DAR	KAN	BRI	TEX	ROV	LVS	HOM	MAR	PHO	N/A	0^{1}	

==== Craftsman Truck Series ====
NASCAR Craftsman Truck Series results
Year	Team	No.	Make	1	2	3	4	5	6	7	8	9	10	11	12	13	14	15	16	17	18	19	20	21	22	23	NCTC	Pts	Ref
2022	G2G Racing	46	Toyota	DAY	LVS	ATL	COA	MAR	BRI	DAR	KAN	TEX	CLT	GTW	SON; PC^{†}	KNO	NSH	MOH; 36	POC	IRP	RCH	KAN	BRI	TAL	HOM	PHO	85th	1	
2023	Reaume Brothers Racing	34	Ford	DAY	LVS	ATL	COA; 26	TEX	BRI	MAR	KAN	DAR	NWS	CLT	GTW	NSH	MOH	POC	RCH	IRP	MLW	KAN	BRI	TAL	HOM	PHO	67th	11	
^{†} – Replaced by Stefan Parsons
