= 2017 Global MX-5 Cup =

2017 Global MX-5 Cup season
- Battery Tender Global Mazda MX-5 Cup presented by BFGoodrich Tires

Season
- Races: 14
- Start date: 22 April
- End date: 15 October

Awards

The 2017 Global MX-5 Cup was the twelfth season of the Mazda MX-5 Cup since the series inception in 2006. It was the second season since the series re-branding as the Global MX-5 Cup, as well as the first under INDYCAR sanctioning.

== Calendar ==
Round		Circuit	Date	Main event
1	R1	(United States) Barber Motorsports Park	22 April	Honda Indy Grand Prix of Alabama
1	R2	(United States) Barber Motorsports Park	22 April	Honda Indy Grand Prix of Alabama
2	R1	(United States) Indianapolis Motor Speedway	16 June	SVRA Brickyard Vintage Racing Invitational
2	R2	(United States) Indianapolis Motor Speedway	17 June	SVRA Brickyard Vintage Racing Invitational
3	R1	(United States) Road America	24 June	Kohler Grand Prix
3	R2	(United States) Road America	25 June	Kohler Grand Prix
4	R1	(Canada) Toronto Street Circuit	15 July	Honda Indy Toronto
4	R2	(Canada) Toronto Street Circuit	16 July	Honda Indy Toronto
5	R1	(United States) Watkins Glen International	2 September	Grand Prix at The Glen
5	R2	(United States) Watkins Glen International	3 September	Grand Prix at The Glen
6	R1	(United States) Mazda Raceway Laguna Seca	23 September	Continental Tire Monterey Grand Prix powered by Mazda
6	R2	(United States) Mazda Raceway Laguna Seca	24 September	Continental Tire Monterey Grand Prix powered by Mazda
7	R1	(United States) Mazda Raceway Laguna Seca	14 October	Pirelli World Challenge
7	R2	(United States) Mazda Raceway Laguna Seca	15 October	Pirelli World Challenge

== Race calendar and results ==
Rnd	Circuit	Location	Date	Pole position	Fastest lap	Most laps led	Winning driver	Winning team
1	Barber Motorsports Park	Leeds, Alabama	22 April	(United States) Nathanial Sparks	(United States) Nikko Reger	(United States) Patrick Gallagher	(United States) Patrick Gallagher	McCumbee McAleer Racing
2	Barber Motorsports Park	Leeds, Alabama	22 April	(United States) Nathanial Sparks	(United States) Robert Stout	(United States) Mark Drennan	(United States) Patrick Gallagher	McCumbee McAleer Racing
3	Indianapolis Motor Speedway	Speedway, Indiana	16 June	(United States) Patrick Gallagher	(United States) Patrick Gallagher	(United States) Robert Stout	(United States) Robert Stout	McCumbee McAleer Racing
4	Indianapolis Motor Speedway	Speedway, Indiana	17 June	(United States) Patrick Gallagher	(United States) Dillon Dexter	(United States) Patrick Gallagher	(United States) Patrick Gallagher	McCumbee McAleer Racing
5	Road America	Elkhart Lake, Wisconsin	23 June	(United States) Matt Cresci	(United States) Dean Copeland	(Puerto Rico) Bryan Ortiz	(United States) Patrick Gallagher	McCumbee McAleer Racing
6	Road America	Elkhart Lake, Wisconsin	24 June	(United States) Matt Cresci	(United States) Dean Copeland	(United States) Nathanial Sparks	(United States) Nathanial Sparks	Sick Sideways Racing
7	Toronto Street Circuit	Toronto, Ontario	15 July	(United States) Patrick Gallagher	(United States) Patrick Gallagher	(Puerto Rico) Bryan Ortiz	(United States) Robert Stout	McCumbee McAleer Racing
8	Toronto Street Circuit	Toronto, Ontario	16 July	(United States) Patrick Gallagher	(United States) Matt Cresci	(United States) Patrick Gallagher	(United States) Patrick Gallagher	McCumbee McAleer Racing
9	Watkins Glen International	Watkins Glen, New York	2 September	(United States) Patrick Gallagher	(United States) Patrick Gallagher	(United States) Patrick Gallagher	(United States) Patrick Gallagher	McCumbee McAleer Racing
10	Watkins Glen International	Watkins Glen, New York	3 September	(United States) Patrick Gallagher	(United States) Todd Lamb	(United States) Todd Lamb	(United States) Todd Lamb	Atlanta Speedwerks
11	Laguna Seca	Monterey, California	23 September	(United States) Robby Foley	(United States) Patrick Gallagher	(United States) Robby Foley	(United States) Patrick Gallagher	McCumbee McAleer Racing
12	Laguna Seca	Monterey, California	24 September	(United States) Robby Foley	(Puerto Rico) Bryan Ortiz	(United States) Robby Foley	(United States) Patrick Gallagher	McCumbee McAleer Racing
13	Laguna Seca	Monterey, California	14 October	(United States) Nikko Reger	(United States) Robert Stout	(United States) Robby Foley	(United States) Matt Cresci	Slipstream Performance
14	Laguna Seca	Monterey, California	15 October	(United States) Nikko Reger	(United States) Luke Oxner	(United States) Patrick Gallagher	(United States) Patrick Gallagher	McCumbee McAleer Racing
