= N37 =

N37 may refer to:

- N37 (Long Island bus)
- A37 motorway (Netherlands)
- HMS Thrasher (N37), a T-class submarine of the Royal Navy captured in 1940
- HMS Seal (N37), a Grampus-class submarine of the Royal Navy scrapped in 1947
- Monticello Airport (New York), in Sullivan County, New York, United States
- Nudelman N-37, a Soviet aircraft cannon
- Wurrugu language
- N37 road (Belgium)
