= Monticello Motor Club =

Private automotive club in New York

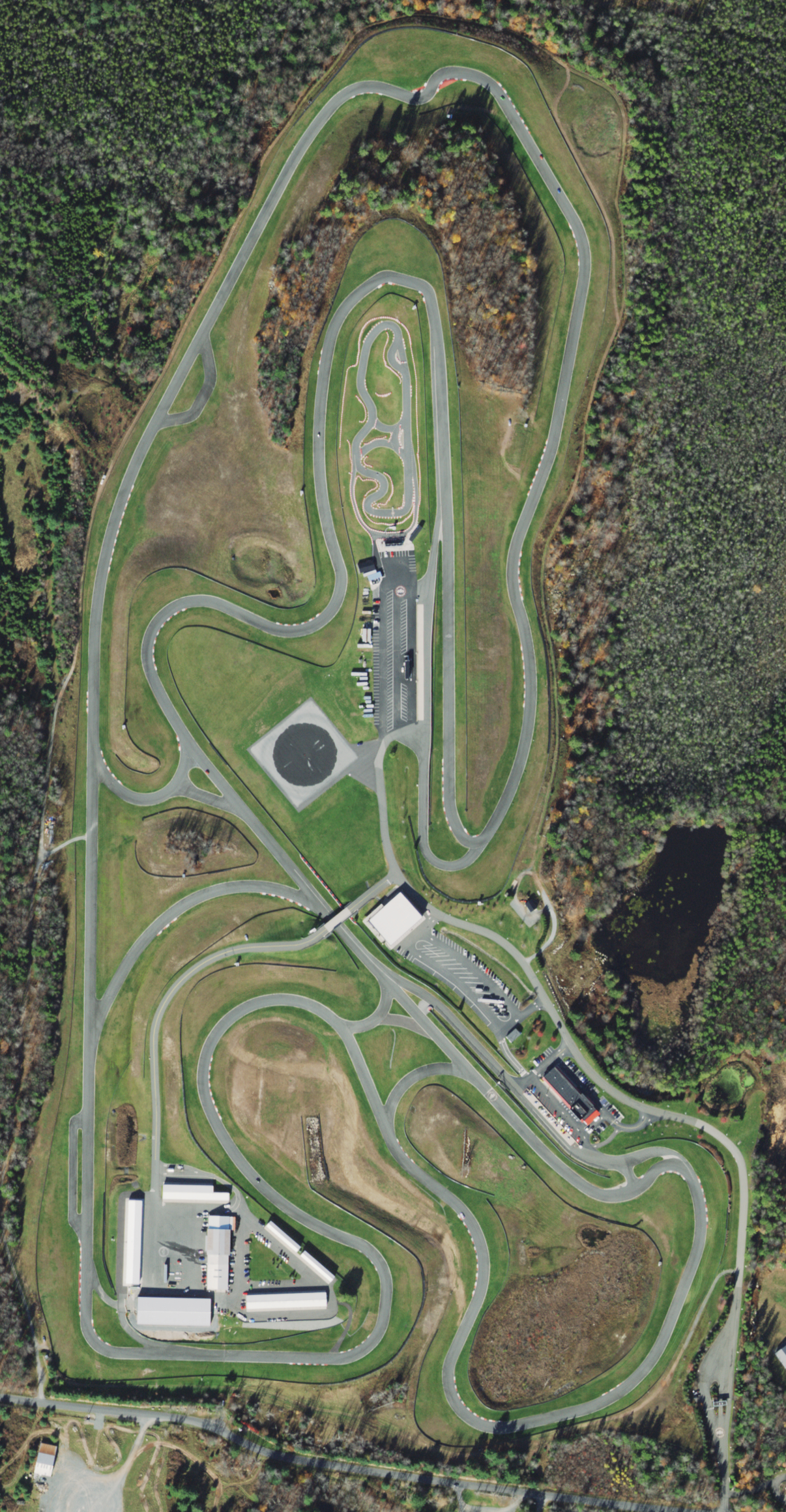
- 2021 aerial photo
- Location: Monticello, New York
- Coordinates: 41°37′0″N 74°42′10″W
- Broke ground: 2006
- Opened: 2008
- Major events: Former: Mazda MX-5 Cup (2018)
- Website: monticellomotorclub.com

Full Course (2008–present)
- Surface: Asphalt
- Length: 4.100 mi (6.598 km)
- Turns: 21
- Race lap record: 2:39.0560 ( (United States) Todd Lamb, Mazda MX-5 (ND), 2018, MX-5 Cup)

The Monticello Motor Club is a private country club for automotive enthusiasts with a 4.100 mi (6.598 km) long motor racing circuit situated in Monticello, New York.

== History ==
It opened on July 27, 2008, and was built on the site of the former Monticello Airport. In May 2010, Ari Straus, the President of the circuit, submitted a bid to host a Formula One race for a ten-year deal, beginning in 2012; But although the deal length was kept, the event was subsequently awarded to Circuit of the Americas near Austin, Texas instead.

== See also ==
- Bilster Berg, a private race resort in Germany
- Circuito Ascari, a similar private race resort in Spain
- Aurora Straus, professional race driver, and daughter of Ari Straus. Female role model for children and young adults
