= Todd Lamb =

Todd Lamb may refer to:

- Todd Lamb (politician) (born 1971), Republican politician from Oklahoma
- Todd Lamb (racing driver) (born 1970), American race car driver
