= 2017 Mazda Road to Indy Shootout =

(United States) 2017 Mazda Road to Indy Shootout
Race details
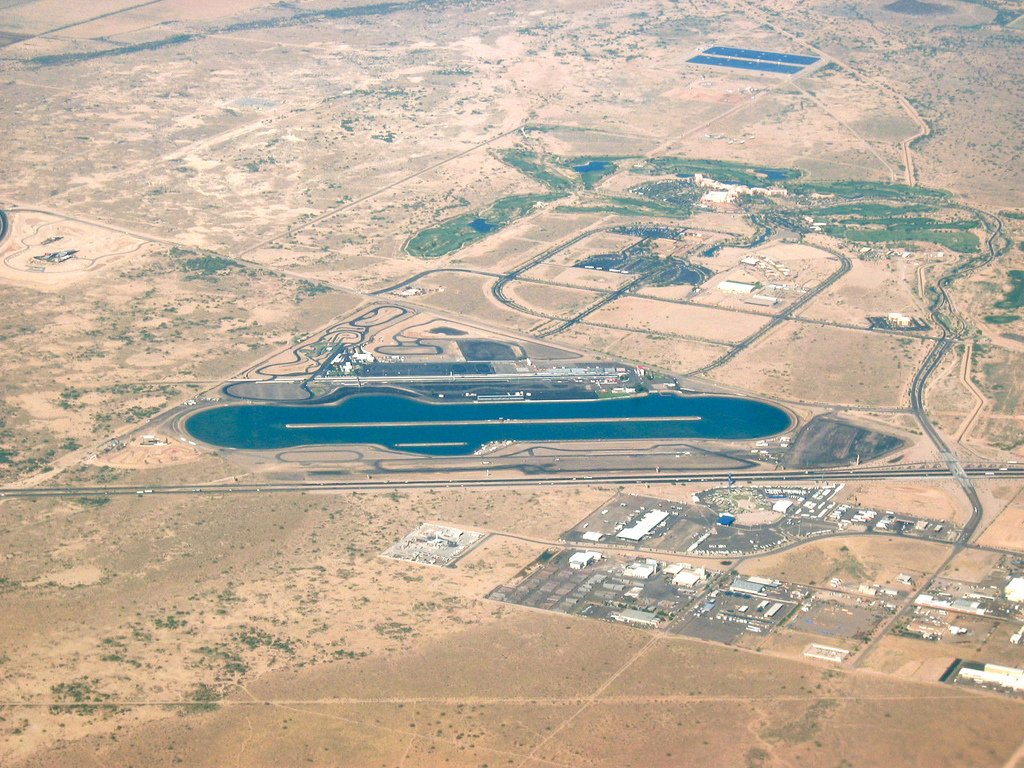
- Date: December 9 & 10, 2017
- Official name: Mazda Road to Indy Shootout
- Location: Wild Horse Pass Motorsports Park
- Course: Road course 1.600 mi / 2.575 km

Podium

The 2017 Mazda Road to Indy Shootout was the second edition of the Road to Indy Shootout. The event was held at Wild Horse Pass Motorsports Park on December 9 and 10. The winner, Irishman Keith Donegan, received a $200,000 scholarship to compete in the 2018 U.S. F2000 National Championship.

== Entry list ==
Driver	Age	2017 result
(New Zealand) Liam Lawson	15	New Zealand Formula Ford Championship champion
(Republic of Ireland) Niall Murray	22	Northern Ireland Formula Ford 1600 champion
(Brazil) Olin Galli	21	Seletiva de Kart Petrobras
(United Kingdom) Ross Martin	16	Scottish Motor Racing Club Formula Ford 1600 Championship champion
(United States) Jake Craig	19	eKartingnews.com selected driver^{1}
(United States) Elliot Finlayson	21	SCCA Runoffs - Formula Enterprises winner
(United Kingdom) Luke Williams	25	BRSCC F1600 national champion
(Canada) Mitch Egner	25	Pacific F2000 representative
(Mexico) Manuel Cabrera	17	Formula Panam representative
(United Kingdom) Jamie Thorburn	19	Formula Ford Super Series Shootout winner^{3}
(Australia) Max Vidau	16	Australian Formula Ford Championship Champion
(United States) Carter Williams	19	Formula Car Challenge representative^{2}
(United Kingdom) Matthew Cowley	20	F1600 Championship Series representative
(United States) Aaron Jeansonne	19	Team USA Scholarship representative ^{5}
(United States) Jonathan Kotyk	23	Team USA Scholarship representative ^{5}
(Republic of Ireland) Keith Donegan	20	Formula Ford Festival representative
(United Kingdom) Oliver White	24	Walter Hayes Trophy representative^{4}
(United States) Spencer Brockman	17	Mazda Motorsports selected driver

=== Notes ===
^1 Karting news website eKartingnews.com chief editor Rob Howden and managing editor David Cole selected Jake Craig as up and coming talent. He was selected to compete in the 2017 Mazda Road to Indy Shootout. Craig was selected out of a short list of finalists, namely Jake French, Brandon Jarsocrak, Braden Eves, Ryan Norberg and Billy Musgrave.

^2 Williams won the FormulaSPEED championship, the fastest of the three Formula Car Challenge West Coast and Triple Crown championships.

^3 iZone Driver Performance hosted a sim racing shootout. Drivers who were nominated for Quantum Racing Suspension Driver of the Race in Formula Ford 1600 races organised by James Beckett Motorsport or MSVR were selected. These drivers were Jack Kemp, Ross Martin, Seb Melrose, James Roe Jr. and Jamie Thorburn. Oliver White also qualified for the shootout but he chose not to compete as he already qualified for the 2017 Mazda Road to Indy Shootout. Irish driver Niall Murray also opted not to participate.

^4 Michael Moyers won the 2017 Walter Hayes Trophy but did not qualify for the Mazda Road to Indy Shootout due to his age (33). As 24-year old Oliver White led most of the race but spun off with 2 laps to go, he was awarded a wildcard entry into the Mazda Road to Indy Shootout.

^5 Jonathan Kotyk and Aaron Jeansonne were selected to represent Team USA Scholarship at the Formula Ford Festival, Walter Hayes Trophy and 2017 Mazda Road to Indy Shootout. The duo was chosen out of ten candidates, Sabré Cook, Konrad Czaczyk, Elliot Finlayson, Kyle Kirkwood, Jacob Loomis, David Osborne, Simon Sikes and Carter Williams did not advance into the final selection.

== Format ==
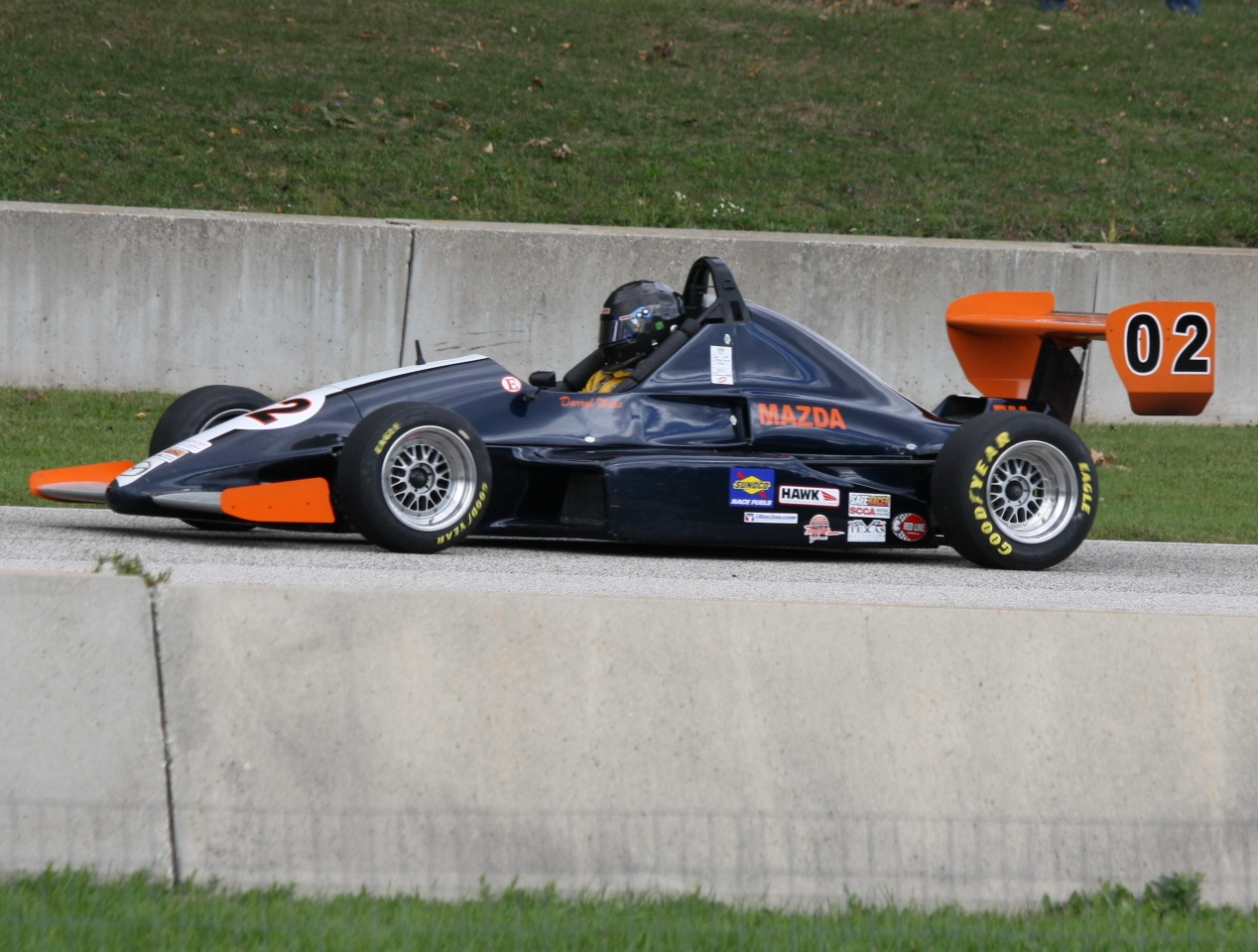
The Formula Mazda car similar to the ones used in the 2017 shootout.

The Bob Bondurant School of High Performance Driving supplied the drivers with first generation Formula Mazda chassis. The tube chassis cars are powered by 180hp rotary engines. The shootout location, Wild Horse Pass Motorsports Park is also the location of the racing school founded by Bob Bondurant.

Judges
(United States) Tom Long	Mazda Motorsports factory driver
(United States) Jonathan Bomarito	Mazda Motorsports factory driver
(United States) Andrew Carbonell	Mazda Motorsports factory driver
(Canada) Scott Goodyear	former IndyCar Series driver
(Brazil) Victor Franzoni	2017 Pro Mazda Championship champion
(United States) Oliver Askew	2017 U.S. F2000 National Championship champion

== Competition ==
All participants participated in a vehicle orientation and then multiple practice sessions over two days, culminating in a pre-qualification session where five finalists would be chosen. Those finalists would then participate in a 30-minute qualifying session and a 30-minute race. After the race, it took a further two hours of deliberation before the judges, including 2016 victor Oliver Askew, decided a victor

Driver	Finale
(Republic of Ireland) Keith Donegan	1
(New Zealand) Liam Lawson	—
(United States) Aaron Jeansonne	—
(United States) Jake Craig	—
(Brazil) Olin Galli	—
