= Mazda MX-5 Cup =

Racing championship

Whelen Mazda MX-5 Cup
- Category: One-make racing by Mazda
- Country: United States
- Inaugural season: 2003
- Manufacturers: Mazda
- Tire suppliers: BFGoodrich
- Drivers' champion: Jeremy Fletcher
- Teams' champion: BSI Racing
- Official website: Official website

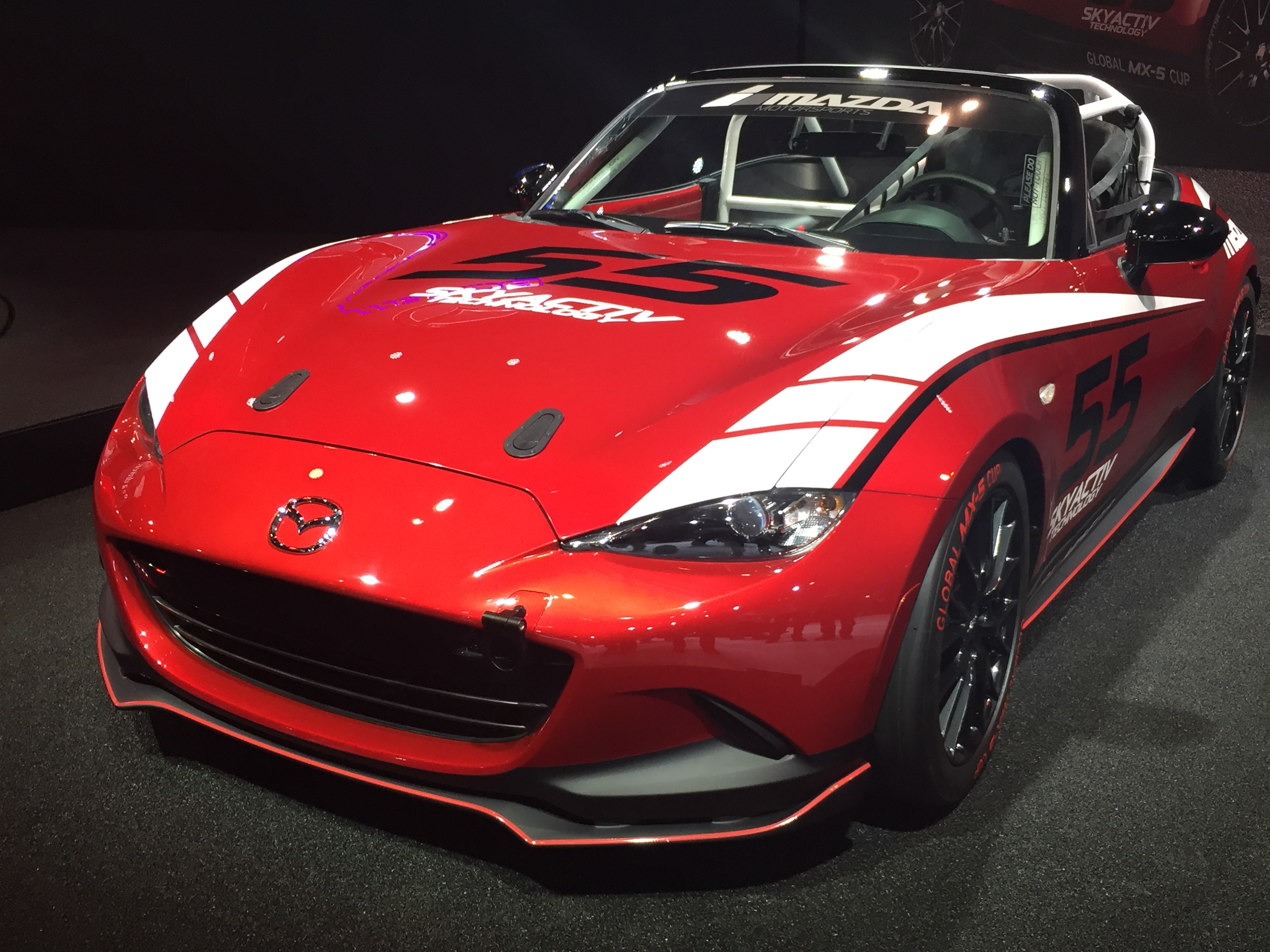
Global MX-5 Cup car - Tokyo Auto Salon 2015

The Whelen Mazda MX-5 Cup presented by Michelin is a single-make motor racing championship sanctioned by the International Motor Sports Association (IMSA) in the United States. Mazda MX-5 Cup is the professional Spec Miata series of Mazda Motorsports, promoted by Andersen Promotions. The pro Spec Miata series has its roots in 2003, but a unified national championship was launched in 2006.

== History ==
The first generation Mazda MX-5 or Mazda Miata was launched in the U.S. market in May 1989 (model year 1990). The Sports Car Club of America placed the car in the Showroom Stock C class for production vehicles with a 1,600 cc engine. The rules allowed the car to be entered in races when the model was one year old, in 1991. As production and popularity of the sports car grew, the SCCA developed a separate class for the car. After an exhibition race at Road Atlanta in 1999, an SCCA regional class was launched in 2000. In professional motorsport, the Miata's were entered in the SCCA World Challenge, but without major results.

=== Mazdaspeed Miata Cup ===
The Mazdaspeed Miata Cup was launched for 2003 with a Pacific and an Atlantic championship. The series first race was run at BeaveRun Motorsports Complex on May 3 and 4, 2003. Chip Herr and Niki Coello won the two races over the weekend. Niki Coello went on to win the Atlantic Tour championship. Bobby Carter won the inaugural Pacific Tour.

=== Mazda MX-5 Cup ===
The introduction of the third generation Mazda MX-5 coincided with the unified national pro series in 2006. The inaugural season started at Mazda Raceway Laguna Seca. A total of 22 racers started the inaugural race which was won by Chip Herr, from pole position. The series was support event for the Rolex Sports Car Series at Laguna Seca, Lime Rock Park, Mid-Ohio and Miller Motorsports Park. The series also supported events of CASCAR, ChampCar, American Le Mans Series and the Grand Prix de Trois-Rivières. Jim Daniels clinched the championship with one round remaining. The 2007 season started at the Grand Prix of Houston with the series first night race. Jason Saini won five out of eight races to clinch the championship. Saini was promoted to the 2008 SCCA World Challenge with Mazda. The 2008 season started with a Mazda Miata shootout. Brad Rampelberg won the race between SCCA and NASA champions to receive a fully funded drive in the 2008 regular season. Rampelberg finished sixth in the season standings winning races at Portland and Miller Motorsports Park. Eric Foss won the championship winning two races but finishing all eight races.

Todd Lamb dominated the 2009 season. Lamb won eight out of ten races, consecutive. Marc Miller and Lyonel Kent won the remaining two races. NASCAR driver Ryan Ellis also competed in the series. Rampelberg continued in the series winning the 2010 series. In 2010 the series had its first standing start, at New Jersey Motorsports Park, previously only using a rolling start. The 2011 season was a tough season for the series. The final rounds of the series saw only 16 entrants. Michael Cooper won the series as Rampelberg moved into the Continental Tire SportsCar Challenge.

For 2012 Todd Snyder was appointed as the director of competition. Snyder left the series at the end of the season to join the IMSA. The series created a partnership with the Skip Barber Racing School for young racers. Bryan Hixon was the first driver to win the class. The regular championship was won by Stevan MacAleer. Former single-seater racer Christian Szymczak won the 2013 series championship. Kenton Koch, winner of the 2013 Skip Barber class, won the 2014 overall championship. This was the first back to back championship win for Alara Racing and team principal Ken Murillo. In November 2014, Mazda unveiled the new Global MX-5 Cup at the SEMA tradeshow. The final season of the third generation car was won by John Dean II with a 13-point margin on Patrick Gallagher.

=== Global MX-5 Cup ===
In 2016, the Global MX-5 Cup was launched. The series featured the new fourth generation Mazda MX-5, and a new prize package. The winner of the series was invited to test a Mazda powered Lola B08/80 prepared by Mazda Motorsports. Last season's championship contenders Dean II and Gallagher again competed at the front of the pack. Gallagher won the first race after Dean II started from pole position. The championship was won by 26-year old Nathanial Sparks. Sparks won a $200,000 scholarship to advance his racing career. The season culminated with a new invitational shootout format. The Mazda MX-5 Cup Global Invitational debuted with nineteen drivers from eight different countries. The inaugural edition was won by Sparks. Former FIA GT1 racer Gabriele Gardel also competed in the race.

For 2017, sanctioning of the series was taken over from SCCA Pro Racing by IndyCar. Promotion of the series was taken over by Andersen Promotions. Andersen Promotions, headed by Dan Andersen, also promotes and runs all series of the Road to Indy (USF2000, Pro Mazda Championship and Indy Lights). The Global MX-5 Series joined the IndyCar Series at the Grand Prix of Alabama, Kohler Grand Prix, Honda Indy Toronto and the Grand Prix at The Glen.

Beginning in 2021, the series partnered with IMSA under a new sanctioning agreement. The series currently races at select WeatherTech SportsCar Championship events, while retaining a single IndyCar event (the Grand Prix of St. Petersburg). In 2022, the series will continue its annual visit to Road America, but will be part of the NASCAR Cup Series race weekend.

== Car ==
=== 2003–2005 ===
In the early Mazdaspeed Miata Cup accepted first- and second generation Mazda MX-5s. The series followed Spec Miata rules as issued by the SCCA, NASA and Midwestern Council. Tyres from the labels Toyo, Kumho and Hankook were allowed. Three types of MX-5's were allowed to run in the series. The edition of the MX-5 built from 1990 through 1993 featured a 1.600cc engine. The car had a minimum weight of 2.300lbs. The second type allowed were cars built from 1994 through 1998. The car featured a 1.800cc engine and had a minimum weight of 2.350lbs. Lastly cars built from 1999 through 2005 featured a 1.800cc engine and had a minimum weight of 2.400lbs.

=== 2006–2015 ===
Between 2006 and 2015, the series used the third generation Mazda MX-5. The car featured the standard 2.0L engine prepared by Mazdaspeed. Through the years, model years 2006 through 2014 were accepted. The engine featured modifications by Mazdaspeed such as a modified cold air intake. The gearbox was a stock 6-speed manual out of the Sport Package. The suspension and shocks were also provided by Mazdaspeed. Tires were provided by Hankook in 2006 and 2007. Between 2008 and 2009 the tires were provided by Kumho. As of 2010 the tires are provided by BFGoodrich.

=== 2016–present ===
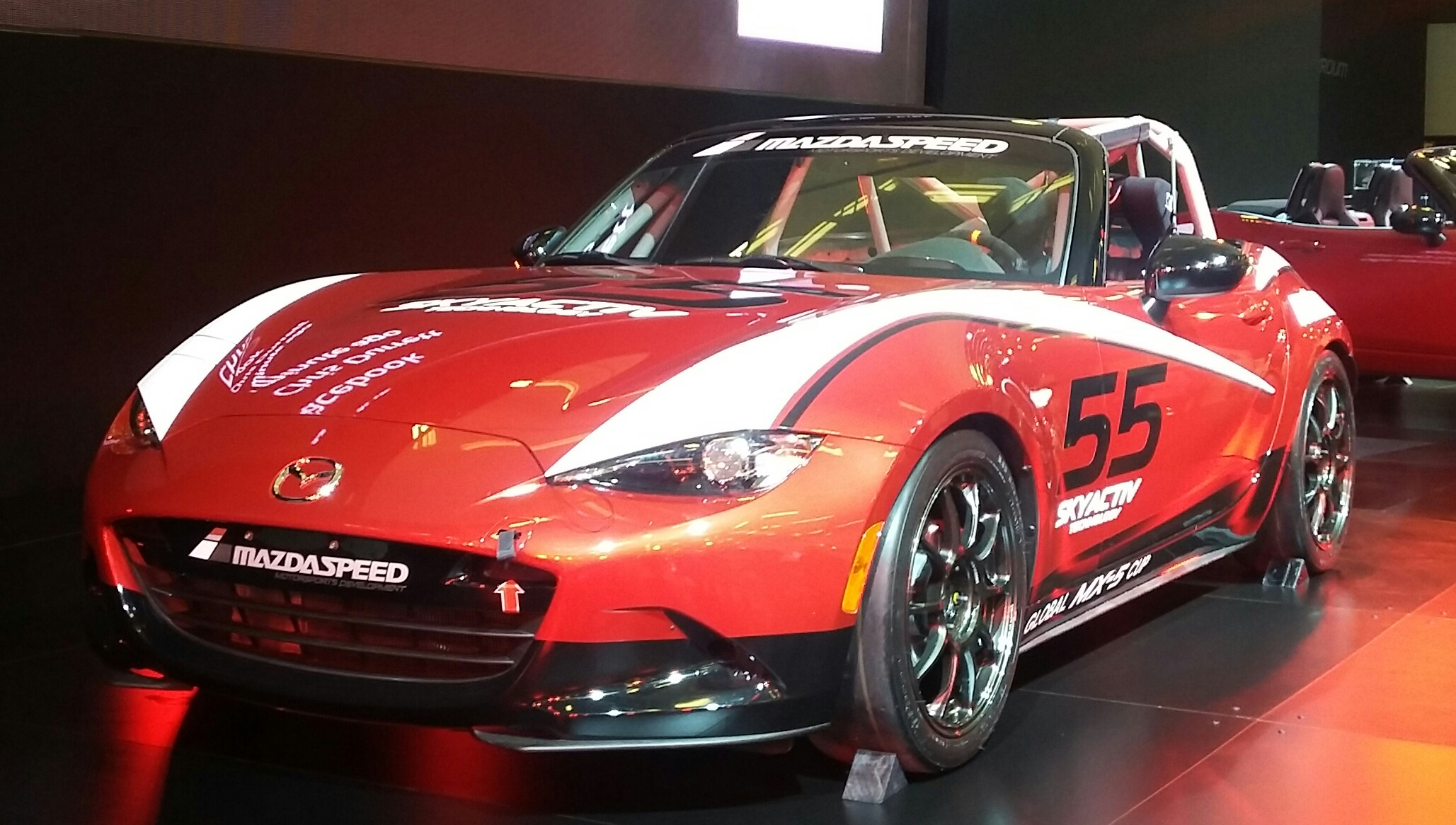
The 2016 Mazda MX-5 Cup edition at the Montreal International Auto Show 2016.

For the 2016 season, Mazda introduced the fourth generation Mazda MX-5. The car is built at the Hiroshima Mazda factory before being transformed into a MX-5 Cup car. The MX-5 Cup version was developed by Mazda North American Operations and Long Road Racing. The engine is a 2.0 L Skyactiv-G (PE-VPS) I4. From 2016 to 2018, the series began with the ND1 iteration of the car, before introducing an updated ND2 class in 2019. For the 2019 season, the series utilized a two-class structure, with a premier ND2 class running alongside the legacy ND1 cars. The ND1 ECU was provided by General Engine Management Systems, while the ND2 upgraded to a Bosch ECU with an increased 7,500rpm limit . The ND2 upgrades also included an increase to 181 horsepower and a motorsport orientated SADEV sequential gearbox. Tom Long was the test driver during the development phases. In 2019, Long Road Racing ceased operations, with responsibilities transferred to Flis Performance.

=== Timeline ===
2000s							2010s
03	04	05	06	07	08	09	10	11	12	13	14	15	16	17
Mazda MX-5 NA			Mazda MX-5 NC										Mazda MX-5 ND
Mazda MX-5 NB			Mazda MX-5 NC										Mazda MX-5 ND
1.600cc			2.000cc
1.800cc			2.000cc
K			H		K		BF
H			H		K		BF
T			H		K		BF

== Champions ==
Mazdaspeed Miata Cup
Year	Atlantic Tour		Pacific Tour	
2003	(United States) Niki Coello		(United States) Bobby Carter	
2004	(United States) Payton Wilson		(United States) Andrew Fernandez	
2005	(United States) Tom Long		(United States) Justin Hall	
Mazda MX-5 Cup
Year	Driver	Team	Shootout winner	Skip Barber class
2006	(United States) Jim Daniels	Team MER		
2007	(United States) Jason Saini	Team MER		
2008	(United States) Eric Foss		(United States) Brad Rampelberg	
2009	(United States) Todd Lamb	AMG Racing	(United States) Justin Piscitell	
2010	(United States) Brad Rampelberg	AMG Racing	(United States) Scott Shelton	
2011	(United States) Michael Cooper	AMG Racing	(United States) Elliott Skeer	
2012	(United Kingdom) Stevan McAleer	CJ Wilson Racing	(United States) Patrick Gallagher	(United States) Bryan Hixon
2013	(United States) Christian Szymczak	Alara Racing	(United States) Joey Bickers	(United States) Kenton Koch
2014	(United States) Kenton Koch	Alara Racing	(United States) Kyle Loustaunau	(United States) Drake Kemper
2015	(United States) John Dean II	Sick Sideways Racing	(United States) Glenn McGee	(United States) Robby Foley
2016	(United States) Nathanial Sparks	Spark Performance/Sick Sideways	(United States) Matt Cresci	
2017	(United States) Patrick Gallagher	McCumbee McAleer Racing	(United States) Selin Rollan	
2018	(United States) Nikko Reger	Slipstream Performance	(United States) Michael Carter	
2019	(Puerto Rico) Bryan Ortiz	Copeland Motorsports	(United States) Jared Thomas	
2020	(United States) Michael Carter	Carter Racing Enterprises	(United States) Aaron Jeansonne	
2021	(United States) Gresham Wagner	Spark Performance	(United States) Connor Zilisch	
2022	(United States) Jared Thomas	JTR Motorsports Engineering	(United States) Nate Cicero	
2023	(United States) Jared Thomas	JTR Motorsports Engineering	(United States) Westin Workman	
2024	(United States) Gresham Wagner	McCumbee McAleer Racing		
2025	(United States) Jeremy Fletcher	McCumbee McAleer Racing		
Global MX-5 Cup Invitational/ MX-5 Cup Challenge
Year	Invitational Winner	Team		
2016	(United States) Nathanial Sparks	Spark Performance/Sick Sideways		
2017	(United States) Patrick Gallagher	McCumbee McAleer Racing		
2018	(United States) Nathanial Sparks	Spark Performance/Sick Sideways		

== Circuits ==
- (Illinois) Autobahn Raceway (2009–2010)
- (Alabama) Barber Motorsports Park (2009, 2017–2018, 2025)
- (Minnesota) Brainerd International Raceway (2011)
- (California) Buttonwillow Raceway Park (2003)
- (Ontario) Canadian Tire Motorsport Park (2004–2006, 2008, 2010, 2012–2016, 2024–present)
- (Ohio) Cleveland Burke Lakefront Airport (2007)
- (Quebec) Circuit Trois-Rivières (2006–2008)
- (Texas) Circuit of the Americas (2018–2019)
- (California) Coronado Street Course (2012–2013)
- (Florida) Daytona International Raceway (2021–present)
- (Michigan) Grattan Raceway Park (2003)
- (Indiana) Indianapolis Motor Speedway (2017, 2020, 2026)
- (Kansas) Heartland Motorsports Park (2003)
- (Florida) Homestead–Miami Speedway (2011)
- (California) Laguna Seca (2004–2017, 2019, 2021, 2023–2024, 2027)
- (Connecticut) Lime Rock Park (2004–2006, 2011)
- Mid-Ohio Sports Car Course (2004, 2006, 2012–2013, 2018–2022, 2024–2026)
- (New York (state)) Monticello Motor Club (2018)
- New Jersey Motorsports Park (2008–2010, 2020)
- (Louisiana) NOLA Motorsports Park (2015)
- (Washington (state)) Pacific Raceways (2003)
- (Arizona) Phoenix Raceway (2004)
- (Pennsylvania) Pittsburgh International Race Complex (2003)
- (Oregon) Portland International Raceway (2004–2008, 2018–2019)
- (Texas) Reliant Park (2007, 2013–2014)
- (Wisconsin) Road America (2003, 2006, 2008–2012, 2014–2023, 2027)
- (Georgia (U.S. state)) Road Atlanta (2004–2005, 2007–2016, 2021–2026)
- (Florida) Sebring International Raceway (2012–2014, 2021, 2024)
- (California) Sonoma Raceway (2005)
- (Florida) St. Petersburg Street Circuit (2020–2023, 2025–2026)
- (Ontario) Toronto Street Circuit (2017)
- Utah Motorsports Campus (2006–2010)
- Virginia International Raceway (2009–2010, 2012, 2016, 2022–present)
- (New York (state)) Watkins Glen International (2016–2017, 2022–2023)
