= 2025 Porsche Carrera Cup North America =

Motor racing competition

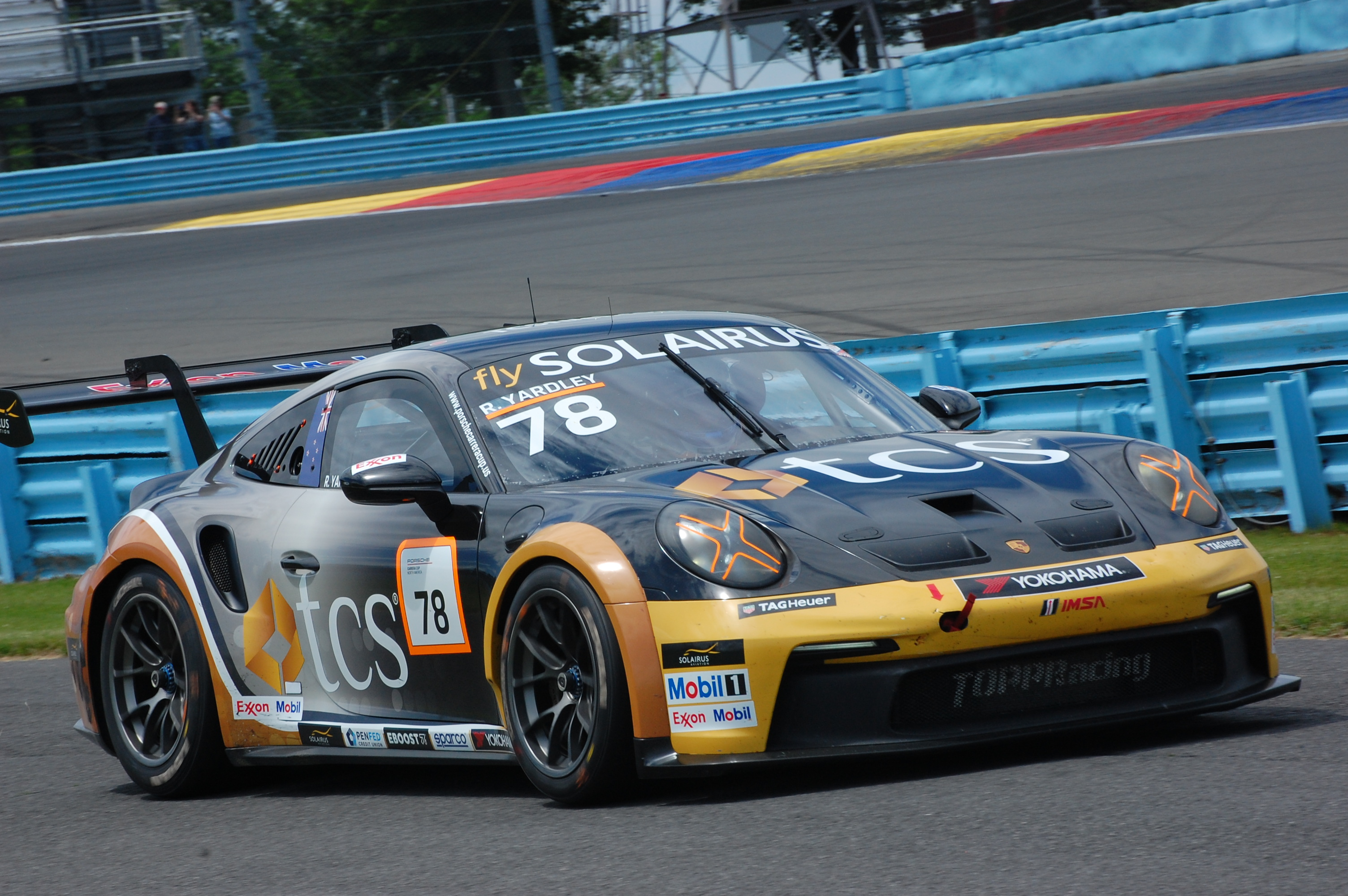
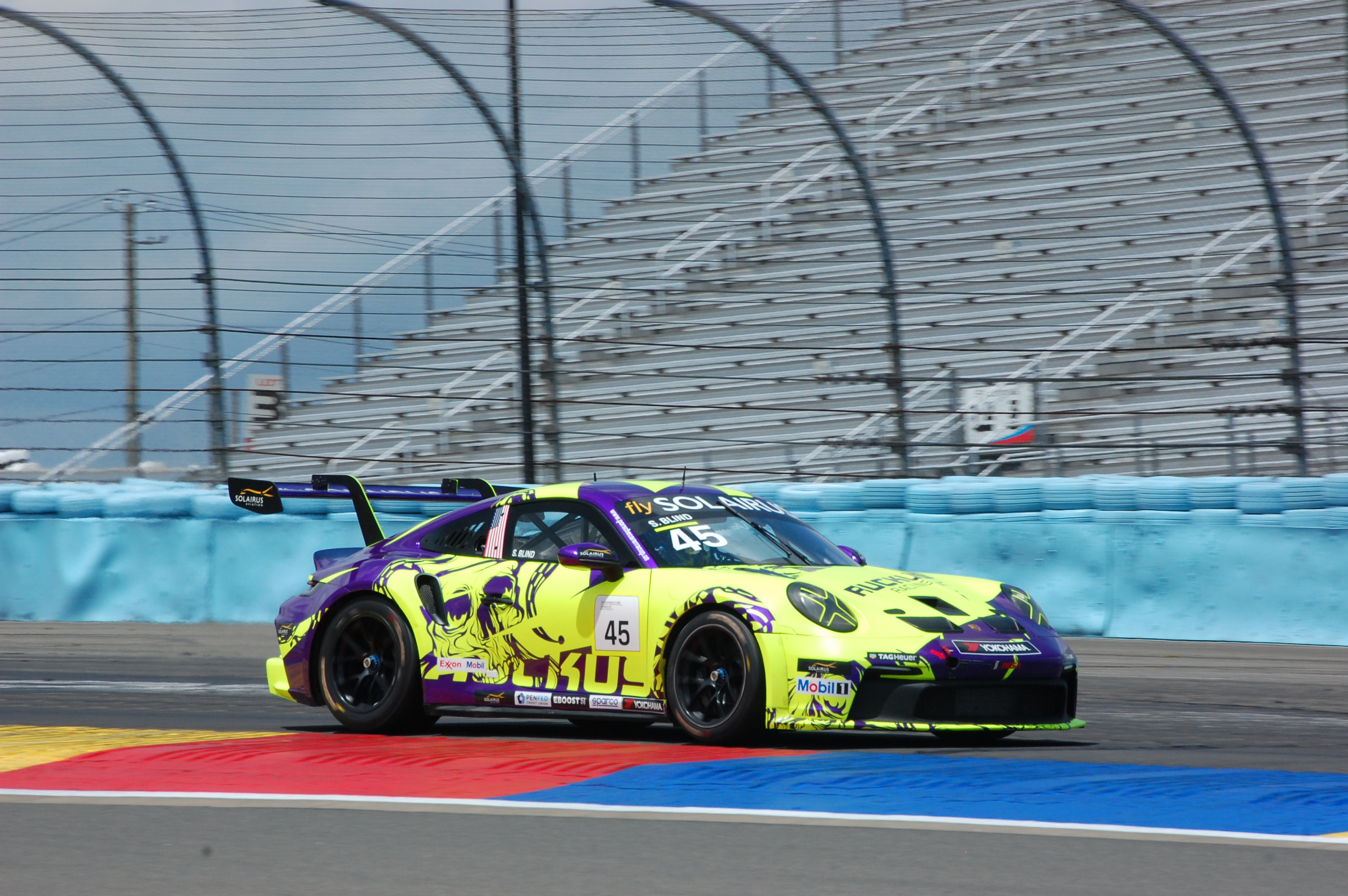
Ryan Yardley is the Overall Drivers' champion with Topp Racing as the Teams' champion. Scott Blind is the Masters' champion

The 2025 Porsche Carrera Cup North America, known as the 2025 Porsche Deluxe Carrera Cup North America for sponsorship reasons, was the fifth season of the Porsche Carrera Cup North America. It began on March 12 at Sebring International Raceway and ended on October 19 at Circuit of the Americas.

== Calendar ==
The calendar was released on October 21, 2024, featuring eight rounds. No changes were made to the schedule from the previous year.

Round	Circuit	Date
1	(United States) Sebring International Raceway, Sebring, Florida	March 12–15
2	(United States) Miami International Autodrome, Miami Gardens, Florida	May 2–4
3	(Canada) Circuit Gilles Villeneuve, Montreal, Quebec	June 13–15
4	(United States) Watkins Glen International, Watkins Glen, New York	June 19–22
5	(United States) Road America, Elkhart Lake, Wisconsin	July 31 – August 1
6	(United States) Indianapolis Motor Speedway, Speedway, Indiana	September 19–21
7	(United States) Road Atlanta, Braselton, Georgia	October 8–11
8	(United States) Circuit of the Americas, Austin, Texas	October 17–19

Race is part of ANDIAL Cup

== Entry list ==
Team	No.	Driver	Class	Rounds
(United States) ACI Motorsports	2	(Dominican Republic) Jimmy Llibre	P	All
(United States) ACI Motorsports	4	(United States) Juan Pablo Martinez	PA	All
(United States) ACI Motorsports	6	(United States) Alex Pratt	P	5, 8
(United States) ACI Motorsports	15	(United States) Yves Baltas	P	All
(United States) ACI Motorsports	16	(United States) Grant Talkie	P	1
(United States) ACI Motorsports	16	(Switzerland) Pedro Torres	PA	3
(United States) ACI Motorsports	18	(United States) Richard Edge	M	1, 4–7
(United States) ACI Motorsports	39	(United States) John Jodoin	P	1, 4–7
(United States) ACI Motorsports	74	(United States) Kenton King	PA	2
(United States) ACI Motorsports	84	(Canada) Marco Cirone	PA	1–7
(United States) Citimarine Motorsports	3	(Estonia) Alexander Reimann	P	5
(United States) Kellymoss	7	(United States) Wesley Slimp	P	All
(United States) Kellymoss	22	(United States) Ashley Freiberg	P	1–4
(United States) Kellymoss	24	(United States) Aaron Jeansonne	P	All
(United States) Kellymoss	91	(United States) Riley Dickinson	P	All
(United States) FMS Motorsport	5	(Venezuela) Angel Benitez	PA	2
(United States) FMS Motorsport	17	(Portugal) Andre Renha Fernandes	PA	2
(United States) FMS Motorsport	27	(Colombia) Juan Pablo Vega	P	2
(United States) McCann Racing	8	(United States) Michael McCann	P	All
(United States) JDX Racing	9	(Canada) Zachary Vanier	P	All
(United States) JDX Racing	37	(United States) Sabré Cook	P	All
(United States) JDX Racing	70	(United States) Joel Johnson	M	7–8
(United States) JDX Racing	71	(United States) Paul Bocuse	P	All
(United States) JDX Racing	82	(New Zealand) Madeline Stewart	P	All
(Germany) Rotek Racing	10	(United States) Jaden Lander	P	1
(Germany) Rotek Racing	28	(United States) Brady Behrman	PA	1
(United States) Alegra Motorsports	11	(United States) Michael de Quesada	P	All
(United States) JTR Motorsports Engineering	12	(United States) Peter Atwater	M	1, 4–5, 7
(United States) JTR Motorsports Engineering	53	(United States) Rob Walker	M	1, 4–5, 7–8
(United States) JTR Motorsports Engineering	96	(United States) Jared Thomas	P	1, 4–8
(United States) Kellymoss	13	(United States) Todd Parriott	M	All
(United States) Kellymoss	68	(United States) Chris Bellomo	M	6–8
(United States) Kellymoss	99	(United States) Alan Metni	PA	All
(United States) GMG Racing	14	(United States) James Sofronas	PA	1–6, 8
(United States) GMG Racing	32	(United States) Kyle Washington	M	1
(United States) GMG Racing	54	(United States) Patrick Mulcahy	PA	All
(United States) Citimarine Motorsports	19	(Venezuela) Javier Ripoll Sanchez	PA	2, 5, 8
(United States) MGM	21	(United States) Jody Miller	M	4
(United States) NOLASPORT	23	(United States) Michael Auriemma	M	1, 5–6
(United States) van der Steur Racing	28	(United States) Brady Behrman	PA	4–7
(United States) Ruckus Racing	45	(United States) Scott Blind	M	All
(United States) NOLASPORT	47	(Brazil) Matheus Leist	P	1–7
(United States) BGB MOTORSPORTS	69	(Canada) Thomas Collingwood	PA	2–3
(United States) Topp Racing	76	(United States) Cole Kleck	P	7–8
(United States) Topp Racing	77	(United States) Tyler Maxson	P	All
(United States) Topp Racing	78	(New Zealand) Ryan Yardley	P	All
(United States) McCann Racing	83	(United States) James McCann	M	4

Icon	Class
P	Pro Cup
PA	Pro-Am Cup
Am	Am Cup
M	Masters Cup
	Guest drivers ineligible to score points

== Race results ==
Round		Circuit	Pole position	Fastest lap	Overall winner	Winning team	Pro-Am winner	Masters winner
1	R1	(United States) Sebring International Raceway	(United States) Riley Dickinson	(United States) Michael McCann	(United States) Riley Dickinson	(United States) Kellymoss	(United States) Juan Pablo Martinez	(United States) Scott Blind
1	R2	(United States) Sebring International Raceway	(United States) Riley Dickinson	(United States) Riley Dickinson	(United States) Riley Dickinson	(United States) Kellymoss	(United States) Juan Pablo Martinez	(United States) Scott Blind
2	R1	(United States) Miami International Autodrome	(Dominican Republic) Jimmy Llibre	(Dominican Republic) Jimmy Llibre	(United States) Yves Baltas	(United States) ACI Motorsports	(United States) James Sofronas	(United States) Todd Parriott
2	R2	(United States) Miami International Autodrome	(Dominican Republic) Jimmy Llibre	(Canada) Zachary Vanier	(United States) Yves Baltas	(United States) ACI Motorsports	(United States) Angel Benitez	(United States) Scott Blind
3	R1	(Canada) Circuit Gilles Villeneuve	(New Zealand) Ryan Yardley	(United States) Riley Dickinson	(New Zealand) Ryan Yardley	(United States) Topp Racing	(United States) James Sofronas	(United States) Scott Blind
3	R2	(Canada) Circuit Gilles Villeneuve	(New Zealand) Ryan Yardley	(United States) Riley Dickinson	(United States) Riley Dickinson	(United States) Kellymoss	(United States) Juan Pablo Martinez	(United States) Scott Blind
4	R1	(United States) Watkins Glen International	(New Zealand) Ryan Yardley	(United States) Riley Dickinson	(United States) Riley Dickinson	(United States) Kellymoss	(United States) Alan Metni	(United States) Scott Blind
4	R2	(United States) Watkins Glen International	(United States) Riley Dickinson	(United States) Riley Dickinson	(Canada) Zachary Vanier	(United States) JDX Racing	(United States) Juan Pablo Martinez	(United States) Todd Parriott
5	R1	(United States) Road America	(United States) Tyler Maxson	(Dominican Republic) Jimmy Llibre	(Dominican Republic) Jimmy Llibre	(United States) ACI Motorsports	(United States) Juan Pablo Martinez	(United States) Peter Atwater
5	R2	(United States) Road America	(United States) Tyler Maxson	(United States) Tyler Maxson	(United States) Tyler Maxson	(United States) Topp Racing	(United States) Juan Pablo Martinez	(United States) Scott Blind
6	R1	(United States) Indianapolis Motor Speedway	(United States) Aaron Jeansonne	(Canada) Zachary Vanier	(Canada) Zachary Vanier	(United States) JDX Racing	(United States) Patrick Mulcahy	(United States) Scott Blind
6	R2	(United States) Indianapolis Motor Speedway	(United States) Aaron Jeansonne	(United States) Aaron Jeansonne	(United States) Aaron Jeansonne	(United States) Kellymoss	(United States) James Sofronas	(United States) Scott Blind
7	R1	(United States) Road Atlanta	(United States) Aaron Jeansonne	(New Zealand) Ryan Yardley	(United States) Tyler Maxson	(United States) Topp Racing	(United States) Alan Metni	(United States) Scott Blind
7	R2	(United States) Road Atlanta	(United States) Riley Dickinson	(United States) Riley Dickinson	(United States) Riley Dickinson	(United States) Kellymoss	(United States) Alan Metni	(United States) Scott Blind
8	R1	(United States) Circuit of the Americas	(New Zealand) Ryan Yardley	(United States) Aaron Jeansonne	(New Zealand) Ryan Yardley	(United States) Topp Racing	(United States) Alan Metni	(United States) Todd Parriott
8	R2	(United States) Circuit of the Americas	(New Zealand) Ryan Yardley	(New Zealand) Ryan Yardley	(New Zealand) Ryan Yardley	(United States) Topp Racing	(United States) Alan Metni	(United States) Scott Blind

== Championship standings ==
=== Scoring system ===
Championship points are awarded in each class at the finish of each event. Points are awarded based on finishing positions in the race as shown in the chart below.

Position	**1st**	**2nd**	**3rd**	**4th**	**5th**	**6th**	**7th**	**8th**	**9th**	**10th**	**11th**	**12th**	**13th**	**14th**	**15th**	Pole	FL
Points	25	20	17	14	12	10	9	8	7	6	5	4	3	2	1	2	1

For the Pro-Am and Masters championships, the lowest two race results before the final round are dropped. All pole position and fastest lap points are retained.

=== Drivers' Championship ===
Pos	Driver	SEB (United States)		MIA (United States)		CGV (Canada)		WGL (United States)		ROA (United States)		IMS (United States)		ATL (United States)		COT (United States)		Pts
Pos	Driver	R1	R2	R1	R2	R1	R2	R1	R2	R1	R2	R1	R2	R1	R2	R1	R2	Pts
Overall
1	(New Zealand) Ryan Yardley	2	2	12	2	**1**	**2**	**2**	3	3	2	2	2	6	3	**1**	**1**	313
2	(United States) Riley Dickinson	**1**	**1**	4	5	2	1	1	**12**	4	3	4	4	5	**1**	3	3	294
3	(Canada) Zachary Vanier	6	3	28	3	3	3	4	1	2	4	1	3	9	4	4	2	250
4	(United States) Aaron Jeansonne	5	5	5	4	6	7	7	5	6	9	**3**	**1**	**2**	2	2	5	229
5	(United States) Tyler Maxson	8	6	2	7	4	11	5	2	**7**	**1**	6	5	1	5	17	4	208
6	(Dominican Republic) Jimmy Llibre	3	28	**10**	**6**	8	4	3	17	1	5	8	12	7	10	5	6	157
7	(United States) Yves Baltas	7	8	1	1	7	5	8	4	8	8	23	6	11	6	19	22	151
8	(United States) Jared Thomas	10	9					22	6	5	6	5	8	4	8	6	8	105
9	(United States) Michael de Quesada	4	4	3	8	22	23	30	10	28	DNS	7	7	10	9	23	13	94
10	(Brazil) Matheus Leist	9	7	7	9	5	6	6	9	27	25	11	26	8	14			87
11	(United States) Paul Bocuse	11	12	25	12	18	8	9	8	9	7	15	9	12	11	8	10	84
12	(United States) Sabré Cook	14	30	24	11	9	9	10	11	10	23	9	25	29	12	7	7	69
13	(United States) Michael McCann	27	29	6	10	10	24	25	7	12	10	25	11	14	15	10	23	56
14	(United States) Cole Kleck													3	7	20	9	33
15	(United States) Juan Pablo Martinez	15	11	23	20	12	12	13	14	13	12	26	16	17	20	11	14	33
16	(New Zealand) Madeline Stewart	DNS	DNS	18	18	14	19	19	15	14	13	24	10	13	13	13	11	28
17	(United States) Ashley Freiberg	13	10	11	19	24	10	11	23									26
18	(United States) James Sofronas	31	16	8	14	11	14	17	26			12	13					25
19	(United States) Alan Metni	16	13	14	21	16	17	12	21	15	14	22	22	15	16	9	12	24
20	(United States) Patrick Mulcahy	19	19	16	28	13	13	16	28			10	19	21	17	12	24	17
21	(United States) John Jodoin	17	31					14	13	11	11	21	17	16	18			15
22	(United States) Scott Blind	20	17	26	17	17	18	15	24	18	15	13	14	19	19	22	17	8
23	(United States) Wesley Slimp	30	21	17	15	19	16	18	16	19	17	14	15	23	25	14	15	8
24	(United States) Grant Talkie	12	14															6
25	(Venezuela) Angel Benitez			9	13													6
26	(Colombia) Juan Pablo Vega			13	16													4
27	(Canada) Marco Cirone	18	15	27	26	15	15	28	DNS			16	18	18	21			4
28	(United States) Alex Pratt									25	19					15	16	1
29	(Venezuela) Javier Ripoll Sanchez			15	22					24	20					21	18	1
30	(United States) Todd Parriott	24	26	19	25	21	22	20	18	20	27			25	27	16	20	0
31	(United States) Richard Edge	21	18					21	25	21	16	19	21	20	22			0
32	(United States) Peter Atwater	22	20					27	19	16	18			26	28			0
33	(United States) Rob Walker	23	22					24	20	17	26			22	23	DNS	21	0
34	(United States) Michael Auriemma	25	23							22	24	17	23					0
35	(United States) Chris Bellomo											18	24	24	29	18	19	0
36	(United States) Brady Behrman	28	27					23	22	23	21	20	20	27	26			0
37	(Canada) Thomas Collingwood			21	24	20	20											0
38	(Portugal) Andre Renha Fernandes			20	27													0
39	(Switzerland) Pedro Torres					23	21											0
40	(United States) Kenton King			22	23													0
41	(Estonia) Alexander Reimann									26	22							0
42	(United States) Joel Johnson													28	24			0
43	(United States) Jaden Lander	29	24															0
44	(United States) Kyle Washington	26	25															0
45	(United States) James McCann							26	DNS									0
46	(United States) Jody Miller							29	27									0
Pro-Am
1	(United States) Juan Pablo Martinez	**1**	1	8	**3**	**2**	1	2	1	1	**1**	6	2	2	3	2	2	334
2	(United States) Alan Metni	2	**2**	3	4	5	5	**1**	**2**	**2**	2	**5**	**6**	**1**	**1**	**1**	**1**	331
3	(United States) Patrick Mulcahy	4	5	5	10	3	**2**	3	5			1	4	4	2	3	4†	218
4	(United States) James Sofronas	6	4	1	2	1	3	4	4			2	1					184
5	(Canada) Marco Cirone	3	3	**9**	8	4	4	6	DNS			3	3	3	4			154
6	(United States) Brady Behrman	5	6					5	3	3	4	4	5	5	5			132
7	(Venezuela) Javier Ripoll Sanchez			4	5					4	3					4	3	88
8	(Venezuela) Angel Benitez			2	1													45
9	(Canada) Thomas Collingwood			7	7	6	6											38
10	(Switzerland) Pedro Torres					7	7											19
11	(Portugal) Andre Renha Fernandes			6	9													17
12	(United States) Kenton King			10	6													16
Masters
1	(United States) Scott Blind	**1**	**1**	**2**	**1**	**1**	**1**	**1**	**4**	3	1	**1**	**1**	**1**	**1**	**3**	**1**	408
2	(United States) Todd Parriott	5	7	1	2	2	2	2	1	4	6			5	5	1	3	242
3	(United States) Richard Edge	2	2					3	5	5	2	4	2	2	2			175
4	(United States) Rob Walker	4	4					4	3	2	5			3	3	DNS	4	139
5	(United States) Peter Atwater	3	3					6	2	**1**	**3**			6	6			132
6	(United States) Chris Bellomo											3	4	4	7	2	2	94
7	(United States) Michael Auriemma	6	5							6	4	2	3					83
8	(United States) Joel Johnson													7	4			24
7	(United States) Kyle Washington	7	6															19
8	(United States) Jody Miller							7	6									19
9	(United States) James McCann							5	DNS									12
Pos	Driver	SEB (United States)		MIA (United States)		CGV (Canada)		WGL (United States)		ROA (United States)		IMS (United States)		ATL (United States)		COT (United States)		Pts

Colour	Result
Gold	Winner
Silver	Second place
Bronze	Third place
Green	Points classification
Blue	Non-points classification
Blue	Non-classified finish (NC)
Purple	Retired, not classified (Ret)
Red	Did not qualify (DNQ)
Red	Did not pre-qualify (DNPQ)
Black	Disqualified (DSQ)
White	Did not start (DNS)
White	Withdrew (WD)
White	Race cancelled (C)
Blank	Did not practice (DNP)
Blank	Did not arrive (DNA)
Blank	Excluded (EX)

- **Bold** - Pole position
- Italics - Fastest lap

- †: Post-event penalty. Car moved to back of grid.

=== Teams' Championship ===
Pos	Team	Pts
1	(United States) Topp Racing	342
2	(United States) Kellymoss	320
3	(United States) JDX Racing	268
4	(United States) ACI Motorsports	253
5	(United States) Alegra Motorsports	146
6	(United States) JTR Motorsports Engineering	139
7	(United States) NOLASPORT	138
8	(United States) McCann Racing	131
9	(United States) Ruckus Racing	119
10	(United States) GMG Racing	111
11	(United States) van der Steur Racing	50
12	(United States) Citimarine Motorsports	42
13	(United States) BGB MOTORSPORTS	24
14	(United States) FMS Motorsport	16
15	(Germany) Rotek Racing	11
16	(United States) MGM	9
