= Aaron Jeansonne =

American racing driver (born 1998)

- Jeansonne in 2025
- Nationality: (United States) American
- Born: July 31, 1998 (age 28) Sulphur, Louisiana, U.S.
- Categorisation: FIA Silver

Previous series
- 2021–2024 2020 2019 2016–2017: Mazda MX-5 Cup; Spec MX-5 Challenge; BRSCC National Formula Ford 1600; Lucas Oil Formula Car Race Series

Aaron Jeansonne (born July 31, 1998) is an American racing driver who last competed in Porsche Carrera Cup North America for Kellymoss.

== Personal life ==
During his stint in open-wheel racing, Jeansonne worked as an aircraft mechanic and as a DoorDash delivery driver to fund his racing career.

== Career ==
Jeansonne began racing in 2015 on dirt ovals in Louisiana. After making his single-seater debut in the Lucas Oil Formula Car Race Series in 2016, Jeansonne returned to the series the following year, taking two wins and clinching runner-up honors. Towards the end of 2017, Jeansonne became the first Louisiana native to be awarded the Team USA Scholarship, as well being a finalist at the Mazda Road to Indy Shootout. After a part-time campaign in the F2000 Championship Series the following year, Jeansonne moved to BRSCC National Formula Ford 1600 for 2019 with Oldfield Motorsport, where he took a lone podium at Brands Hatch to take 12th in overall points.

After missing out on the Mazda Road to 24 Shootout in late 2019, Jeansonne moved to the Spec MX-5 Challenge series in 2020, where he won the Invitational title, the Emerging Talent award, and the end-of-year Mazda MX-5 Cup Shootout. Moving up to the MX-5 Cup for 2021 with Provision Motorsports, Jeansonne took a lone podium at Laguna Seca to finish eighth overall, before slipping to tenth in 2022 with Spark Performance. During 2022, Jeansonne made a cameo appearance in the Formula Regional Americas Championship for Future Star Racing in New Jersey, in which he took a best result of third in race three. Moving to JTR Motorsports Engineering in MX-5 for 2023, Jeansonne took his maiden series wins at Laguna Seca and Watkins Glen, as well as three other podiums to secure runner-up honors overall behind Jared Thomas. Continuing with JTR for 2024, Jeansonne's only win came at Laguna Seca from pole, as he took fifth in the standings with two other poles to his name.

In 2025, Jeansonne made the full-time transition to one-make Porsche racing, joining Kellymoss to compete in Porsche Carrera Cup North America. In his rookie year in the series, Jeansonne took a lone win at Indianapolis and four other podiums to take fourth in overall points. In 2026, Jeansonne remained with Kellymoss in PCCNA, scoring a lone win at Indianapolis and twelve other podiums to secure runner-up honours overall. Towards the end of the year, Jeansonne made his GT3 debut, driving Kellymoss' Porsche 911 GT3 R (992.2) at the Indianapolis 8 Hour alongside John Gilliland and Loek Hartog.

== Racing record ==
=== Racing career summary ===
Season	Series	Team	Races	Wins	Poles	F/Laps	Podiums	Points	Position
2016	Lucas Oil Formula Car Race Series		4	1	0	0	2	39	7th
2017	Lucas Oil Formula Car Race Series		14	2	2	1	8	430	**2nd**
2017	BRSCC Northern FF1600 Championship		2	0	0	0	0	15	28th
2017	Walter Hayes Trophy		0	0	0	0	0	—N/a	DNQ
2017	Formula Ford Festival		1	0	0	0	0	—N/a	13th
2017	Mazda Road to Indy Shootout	Lucas Oil School of Racing	1	0	0	0	0	—N/a	Finalist
2018	F2000 Championship Series		6	0	0	0	0	93	17th
2019	BRSCC National Formula Ford 1600 – Pro	Oldfield Motorsport	14	0	0	0	1	126	12th
2020	Spec MX-5 Challenge							105	5th
2021	Mazda MX-5 Cup	Provision Motorsports	14	0	0	0	1	2800	8th
2022	Mazda MX-5 Cup	Spark Performance	14	0	1	0	0	2395	10th
2022	Formula Regional Americas Championship	Future Star Racing	3	0	0	0	1	25	13th
2023	Mazda MX-5 Cup	JTR Motorsports Engineering	14	2	3	1	5	3570	**2nd**
2024	Mazda MX-5 Cup	JTR Motorsports Engineering	14	1	3	1	1	3480	5th
2024	Porsche Endurance Challenge North America – GT3 Cup	JTR Motorsports Engineering	3	2	0	0	3	228	**3rd**
2024	Porsche Sprint Challenge North America – 992 Pro-Am	JTR Motorsports Engineering	4	1	1	1	3	188	10th
2025	Porsche Carrera Cup North America	Kellymoss	16	1	3	2	5	229	4th
2025	Porsche Endurance Challenge North America – GT3 Cup Pro-Am							168	5th
2026	Porsche Carrera Cup North America	Kellymoss	16	1	1	3	13	278	**2nd**
2026	GT World Challenge America – Pro-Am	Kellymoss	1	0	0	0	0	0	NC†
2026	Intercontinental GT Challenge	Kellymoss	1	0	0	0	0	0	NC
2026	Porsche Endurance Challenge North America – GT3 Cup Pro-Am		3	0	0	0	1	154	4th

^{†} As Jeansonne was a guest driver, he was ineligible to score points.

=== Complete Mazda MX-5 Cup results ===
(key) (Races in bold indicate pole position. Races in italics indicate fastest race lap in class. Results are overall/class)

Year	Team	1	2	3	4	5	6	7	8	9	10	11	12	13	14	Rank	Points
2021	Provision Motorsports	DAY; 1; 8	DAY; 2; 12	SEB; 1; 6	SEB; 2; 4	STP; 1; 10	STP; 2; 21	MOH; 1; 13	MOH; 2; 19	ELK; 1; 8	ELK; 2; 4	LGA; 1; 3	LGA; 2; 20	ATL; 1; 8	ATL; 2; 22	8th	2800
2022	Spark Performance	DAY; 1; 10	DAY; 2; 17	STP; 1; 12	STP; 2; 8	MOH; 1; 16	MOH; 2; 14	WGL; 1; 4	**WGL**; **2**; 23	ELK; 1; 6	ELK; 2; 6	VIR; 1; 20	VIR; 2; 20	ATL; 1; 11	ATL; 2; 22	10th	2395
2023	JTR Motorsports Engineering	DAY; 1; 4	DAY; 2; 6	STP; 1; 4	STP; 2; 2	LGA; 1; 3	**LGA**; **2**; 1	WGL; 1; 1	WGL; 2; 7	ELK; 1; 15	ELK; 2; 21	**VIR**; **1**; 23	VIR; 2; 2	**ATL**; **1**; 7	ATL; 2; 7	2nd	3570
2024	JTR Motorsports Engineering	DAY; 1; 4	DAY; 2; 13	SEB; 1; 7	SEB; 2; 5	**LAG**; **1**; 5	**LAG**; **2**; 1	MOH; 1; 5	MOH; 2; 14	**MOS**; **1**; 5	MOS; 2; 4	VIR; 1; 7	VIR; 2; 14	ATL; 1; 6	ATL; 2; 9	5th	3480

=== Complete Porsche Carrera Cup North America results ===
(key) (Races in bold indicate pole position) (Races in italics indicate fastest lap)

Year	Team	Class	1	2	3	4	5	6	7	8	9	10	11	12	13	14	15	16	17	Pos	Points
2025	Kellymoss	Pro	SEB; 1; 5	SEB; 2; 5	MIA; 1; 5	MIA; 2; 4	CGV; 1; 6	CGV; 2; 7	WGL; 1; 7	WGL; 2; 5	ROA; 1; 6	ROA; 2; 9	**IMS**; **1**; 3	**IMS**; **2**; 1	**ATL**; **1**; 2	ATL; 2; 2	COT; 1; 2	COT; 2; 5		4th	229
2026	Kellymoss	Pro	SEB; 1; 3	SEB; 2; 2	LBH; 1; 2	LBH; 2; 2	MIA; 1; 18	MIA; 2 C	WGL; 1; 3	WGL; 2; 4	ROA; 1; 2	ROA; 2; 3	ROA; 3; 2	IMS; 1; 3	**IMS**; **2**; 1	ATL; 1; 2	ATL; 2; 2	COT; 1; 2	COT; 2; 10	2nd	278
