= Christian Szymczak =

American racecar driver (born 1974)

Christian Szymczak (born March 4, 1974) is an American racecar driver who competed in the Barber Dodge Pro Series in 2001 and 2002, finishing 11th and eighth in points in his two years, respectively.

In 2013, Szymczak won the SCCA Pro Racing Playboy Mazda MX-5 Cup championship. In 2021, he and co-driver Kenny Murillo won the Silver Cup championship of the GT4 America Series.

== Complete motorsports results ==
=== American Open-Wheel racing results ===
(key) (Races in bold indicate pole position, races in italics indicate fastest race lap)

==== Barber Dodge Pro Series ====
Year	1	2	3	4	5	6	7	8	9	10	11	12	Rank	Points
2001	SEB; 11	PIR; 8	LRP1; 13	LRP2; 18	DET; 18	CLE; 5	TOR; 16	CHI; 14	MOH; 6	ROA; 5	VAN; 10	LS; 7	**11th**	**65**
2002	SEB; 5	LRP; 19	LAG; 4	POR; 20	TOR; 6	CLE; 11	VAN; 7	**MOH**; 21	ROA; 11	MTL; 21			**8th**	**54**
