= 2021 GT4 America Series =

Racing series

The 2021 Pirelli GT4 America Series is the third season of the GT4 America Series. The season began on 5 March at Sonoma Raceway and ended on 17 October at Indianapolis Motor Speedway.

== Calendar ==
The final calendar was announced on 3 October 2020, featuring seven rounds. The round at Canadian Tire Motorsports Park was later canceled. In June, Sebring International Raceway was announced as the CTMP round's replacement.

| Round | Circuit | Date |
|---|---|---|
| 1 | (United States) Sonoma Raceway, Sonoma, California | 5–7 March |
| 2 | (United States) Circuit of the Americas, Elroy, Texas | 30 April-2 May |
| 3 | (United States) Virginia International Raceway, Alton, Virginia | 4–6 June |
| 4 | (United States) Road America, Elkhart Lake, Wisconsin | 27–29 August |
| 5 | (United States) Watkins Glen International, Watkins Glen, New York | 17–19 September |
| 6 | (United States) Sebring International Raceway, Sebring, Florida | 1–3 October |
| 7 | (United States) Indianapolis Motor Speedway, Speedway, Indiana | 15–17 October |
Cancelled due to the COVID-19 pandemic
| | Circuit | Original Date |
| | (Canada) Canadian Tire Motorsports Park, Bowmanville, Ontario | 21–23 May |

== Entry list ==
| Team | Car | No. | Drivers | Class | Rounds |
|---|---|---|---|---|---|
| (United States) Notlad Racing by RS1 | Aston Martin Vantage AMR GT4 | 00 | (United States) Matt Dalton | PA | 1–3 |
| (United States) Notlad Racing by RS1 | Aston Martin Vantage AMR GT4 | 00 | (United States) Patrick Gallagher | PA | 1–3 |
| (United States) RS1 | Porsche 718 Cayman GT4 Clubsport | 37 | (United States) Charlie Belluardo | PA | 5 |
| (United States) RS1 | Porsche 718 Cayman GT4 Clubsport | 37 | (United States) Trent Hindman | PA | 5 |
| (United States) Automatic Racing | Aston Martin Vantage AMR GT4 | 09 | (United States) Paul Kiebler | Am | 4–7 |
| (United States) Automatic Racing | Aston Martin Vantage AMR GT4 | 09 | (United States) Mikel Miller | Am | 4–7 |
| (United States) Dexter Racing | Aston Martin Vantage AMR GT4 | 062 | (United States) Ryan Dexter | S | All |
| (United States) Dexter Racing | Aston Martin Vantage AMR GT4 | 062 | (United States) Warren Dexter | S | All |
| (United States) GMG Racing | Aston Martin Vantage AMR GT4 | 2 | (United States) Jason Bell | PA | All |
| (United States) GMG Racing | Aston Martin Vantage AMR GT4 | 2 | (United States) Andrew Davis | PA | All |
| (United States) GMG Racing | Audi R8 LMS GT4 Evo | 8 | (United States) Andy Lee | PA | 1–2, 6 |
| (United States) GMG Racing | Audi R8 LMS GT4 Evo | 8 | (United States) Elias Sabo | PA | 1–2, 6 |
| (United States) Motorsport USA | McLaren 570S GT4 | 5 | (United States) Michael McAleenan | Am | 1–2, 4–5 |
| (United States) Motorsport USA | McLaren 570S GT4 | 5 | (United States) Jerold Lowe | Am | 1 |
| (United States) Motorsport USA | McLaren 570S GT4 | 5 | (United States) Dan Rogers | Am | 2, 4–5 |
| (United States) Motorsport USA | McLaren 570S GT4 | 23 | (United States) Cavan O'Keefe | Am | 1–2, 4 |
| (United States) Motorsport USA | McLaren 570S GT4 | 23 | (United States) Memo Gidley | Am | 1 |
| (United States) Motorsport USA | McLaren 570S GT4 | 23 | (United States) Jason Alexandridis | Am | 4 |
| (United States) Motorsport USA | McLaren 570S GT4 | 23 | (United States) Jerold Lowe | Am | 2 |
| (United States) Motorsport USA | McLaren 570S GT4 | 111 | (United States) Todd Clarke | Am | 1–2, 4–5 |
| (United States) Motorsport USA | McLaren 570S GT4 | 111 | (United States) Ty Clarke | Am | 1–2, 4–5 |
| (United States) Nolasport with OGH | Porsche 718 Cayman GT4 Clubsport | 7 | (United States) Sean Gibbons | Am | All |
| (United States) Nolasport with OGH | Porsche 718 Cayman GT4 Clubsport | 7 | (United States) Sam Owen | Am | All |
| (United States) Nolasport | Porsche 718 Cayman GT4 Clubsport | 46 | (United States) Russell Walker | Am | 1–6 |
| (United States) Nolasport | Porsche 718 Cayman GT4 Clubsport | 46 | (United States) Patrick Byrne | Am | 1 |
| (United States) Nolasport | Porsche 718 Cayman GT4 Clubsport | 46 | (United States) David Walker | Am | 2–6 |
| (United States) Nolasport | Porsche 718 Cayman GT4 Clubsport | 47 | (United States) Jason Hart | PA | All |
| (United States) Nolasport | Porsche 718 Cayman GT4 Clubsport | 47 | (United States) Matt Travis | PA | All |
| (United States) Nolasport | Porsche 718 Cayman GT4 Clubsport | 48 | (United States) Dominic Starkweather | Am | 4–5 |
| (United States) Nolasport | Porsche 718 Cayman GT4 Clubsport | 48 | (United States) Anthony Geraci | Am | 4 |
| (United States) Nolasport | Porsche 718 Cayman GT4 Clubsport | 48 | (United States) Jason Alexandridis | Am | 5 |
| (United States) Classic BMW | BMW M4 GT4 | 11 | (United States) Toby Grahovec | S | 2–7 |
| (United States) Classic BMW | BMW M4 GT4 | 11 | (United Kingdom) Stevan McAleer | S | 2–7 |
| (United States) BSport Racing | Aston Martin Vantage AMR GT4 | 15 | (United States) Kenton Koch | PA | All |
| (United States) BSport Racing | Aston Martin Vantage AMR GT4 | 15 | (United States) Bryan Putt | PA | All |
| (United States) Capstone Motorsports | Mercedes-AMG GT4 | 16 | (United States) Kris Wilson | Am | All |
| (United States) Capstone Motorsports | Mercedes-AMG GT4 | 16 | (United States) John Allen | Am | 1–5, 7 |
| (United States) Capstone Motorsports | Mercedes-AMG GT4 | 16 | (United States) Jon Berry | Am | 6 |
| (United States) The Racer's Group | Porsche 718 Cayman GT4 Clubsport | 17 | (United States) James Rappaport | Am | 1–4, 7 |
| (United States) The Racer's Group | Porsche 718 Cayman GT4 Clubsport | 17 | (United States) Robert Orcutt | Am | 1 |
| (United States) The Racer's Group | Porsche 718 Cayman GT4 Clubsport | 17 | (United States) Todd Hetherington | Am | 2–4, 7 |
| (United States) The Racer's Group | Porsche 718 Cayman GT4 Clubsport | 66 | (United States) Derek DeBoer | PA | 1–5, 7 |
| (United States) The Racer's Group | Porsche 718 Cayman GT4 Clubsport | 66 | (United States) Spencer Pumpelly | PA | 1–5, 7 |
| (United States) TGR Forbush Performance | Toyota GR Supra GT4 | 18 | (United States) Matt Forbush | Am | All |
| (United States) TGR Forbush Performance | Toyota GR Supra GT4 | 18 | (Canada) Damon Surzyshyn | Am | All |
| (United States) CCR Racing / Team TFB | BMW M4 GT4 | 22 | (United States) Tim Barber | S | All |
| (United States) CCR Racing / Team TFB | BMW M4 GT4 | 22 | (United States) Cole Ciraulo | S | All |
| (United States) Heart of Racing Team | Aston Martin Vantage AMR GT4 | 24 | (United States) Ian James | PA | All |
| (United States) Heart of Racing Team | Aston Martin Vantage AMR GT4 | 24 | (United States) Gray Newell | PA | All |
| (Canada) ST Racing | BMW M4 GT4 | 28 | (United States) Ryan Eversley | PA | 1–2 |
| (Canada) ST Racing | BMW M4 GT4 | 28 | (United States) Joe Rubbo | PA | 1–2 |
| (Canada) ST Racing | BMW M4 GT4 | 28 | (United States) Harry Gottsacker | S | 4 |
| (Canada) ST Racing | BMW M4 GT4 | 28 | (United States) Tyler Maxson | S | 4 |
| (Canada) ST Racing | BMW M4 GT4 | 38 | (United States) Bryson Lew | S | 1, 4 |
| (Canada) ST Racing | BMW M4 GT4 | 38 | (United States) Tomas Mejia | S | 1–4 |
| (Canada) ST Racing | BMW M4 GT4 | 38 | (Canada) Nick Wittmer | S | 2–3 |
| (United States) Rearden Racing | Audi R8 LMS GT4 Evo | 29 | (United States) Dmitri Novikov | PA | 2 |
| (United States) Rearden Racing | Audi R8 LMS GT4 Evo | 29 | (United States) Owen Trinkler | PA | 2 |
| (United States) Rearden Racing | Audi R8 LMS GT4 Evo | 888 | (United States) Kris McCoy | PA | 1 |
| (United States) Rearden Racing | Audi R8 LMS GT4 Evo | 888 | (United States) Jeff Westphal | PA | 1 |
| (United States) Rearden Racing | Audi R8 LMS GT4 Evo | 888 | (United States) Jeff Westphal | S | 2 |
| (United States) Rearden Racing | Audi R8 LMS GT4 Evo | 888 | (Bulgaria) Vesko Kozarov | S | 2 |
| (United States) Bimmerworld Racing | BMW M4 GT4 | 34 | (United States) Bill Auberlen | PA | All |
| (United States) Bimmerworld Racing | BMW M4 GT4 | 34 | (United States) James Walker | PA | All |
| (United States) Bimmerworld Racing | BMW M4 GT4 | 36 | (United States) James Clay | PA | All |
| (United States) Bimmerworld Racing | BMW M4 GT4 | 36 | (United States) Nick Galante | PA | All |
| (United States) Bimmerworld Racing | BMW M4 GT4 | 94 | (United States) Chandler Hull | S | 1–5, 7 |
| (United States) Bimmerworld Racing | BMW M4 GT4 | 94 | (United States) Jon Miller | S | 1–5, 7 |
| (United States) Conquest Racing West | Mercedes-AMG GT4 | 35 | (United States) Michai Stephens | S | 4–7 |
| (United States) Conquest Racing West | Mercedes-AMG GT4 | 35 | (United States) Collin Mullan | S | 4–7 |
| (United States) RENNtech Motorsports | Mercedes-AMG GT4 | 39 | (United States) Chris Cagnazzi | PA | 2–4, 6–7 |
| (United States) RENNtech Motorsports | Mercedes-AMG GT4 | 39 | (United States) Guy Cosmo | PA | 2–4, 6–7 |
| (United States) RENNtech Motorsports | Mercedes-AMG GT4 | 79 | (United States) Christopher Gumprecht | PA | 4–7 |
| (United States) RENNtech Motorsports | Mercedes-AMG GT4 | 79 | (Canada) Kyle Marcelli | PA | 4–7 |
| (United States) RENNtech Motorsports | Mercedes-AMG GT4 | 89 | (United States) Ross Chouest | PA | 1–4 |
| (United States) RENNtech Motorsports | Mercedes-AMG GT4 | 89 | (Canada) Aaron Povoledo | PA | 1–4 |
| (United States) PF Racing | Ford Mustang GT4 | 40 | (United States) Chad McCumbee | S | 4 |
| (United States) PF Racing | Ford Mustang GT4 | 40 | (United States) James Pesek | S | 4 |
| (United States) Murillo Racing | Porsche 718 Cayman GT4 Clubsport | 43 | (United States) Aurora Straus | Am | 1–2 |
| (United States) Murillo Racing | Porsche 718 Cayman GT4 Clubsport | 43 | (Denmark) Christina Nielsen | Am | 1 |
| (United States) Murillo Racing | Porsche 718 Cayman GT4 Clubsport | 43 | (United States) Jeff Mosing | Am | 2 |
| (United States) Murillo Racing | Mercedes-AMG GT4 | 72 | (United States) Kenny Murillo | S | All |
| (United States) Murillo Racing | Mercedes-AMG GT4 | 72 | (United States) Christian Szymczak | S | All |
| (United States) 3R Povoledo Racing | Aston Martin Vantage AMR GT4 | 50 | (United States) Ross Chouest | PA | 5–6 |
| (United States) 3R Povoledo Racing | Aston Martin Vantage AMR GT4 | 50 | (Canada) Aaron Povoledo | PA | 5–6 |
| (United States) AutoTechnic Racing | BMW M4 GT4 | 52 | (United States) John Capestro-Dubets | PA | 2–7 |
| (United States) AutoTechnic Racing | BMW M4 GT4 | 52 | (United States) Tom Capizzi | PA | 2–7 |
| (United States) Black Swan Racing | Porsche Cayman GT4 Clubsport MR | 54 | (Netherlands) Jeroen Bleekemolen | PA | 1–4, 6 |
| (United States) Black Swan Racing | Porsche Cayman GT4 Clubsport MR | 54 | (United States) Tim Pappas | PA | 1–4, 6 |
| (United States) WR Racing | Aston Martin Vantage AMR GT4 | 59 | (United States) Paul Terry | PA | All |
| (United States) WR Racing | Aston Martin Vantage AMR GT4 | 59 | (United States) Brandon Davis | PA | 1–4 |
| (United States) WR Racing | Aston Martin Vantage AMR GT4 | 59 | (United States) Owen Trinkler | PA | 5–6 |
| (United States) WR Racing | Aston Martin Vantage AMR GT4 | 59 | (France) Valentin Hasse-Clot | PA | 7 |
| (United States) TGR Smooge Racing | Toyota GR Supra GT4 | 68 | (United States) Kevin Conway | Am | All |
| (United States) TGR Smooge Racing | Toyota GR Supra GT4 | 68 | (United States) John Geesbreght | Am | All |
| (United States) Marco Polo Motorsports | KTM X-Bow GT4 Evo | 71 | (United States) Nicolai Elghanayan | S | 1–3 |
| (United States) Marco Polo Motorsports | KTM X-Bow GT4 Evo | 71 | (Norway) Mads Siljehaug | S | 1–3 |
| (United States) Random Vandals Racing | BMW M4 GT4 | 98 | (United States) Paul Sparta | Am | All |
| (United States) Random Vandals Racing | BMW M4 GT4 | 98 | (United States) Al Carter | Am | 1–2, 4–7 |
| (United States) Random Vandals Racing | BMW M4 GT4 | 98 | (United States) Andrew Wikstrom | Am | 3 |
| (United States) Stephen Cameron Racing | BMW M4 GT4 | 119 | (Australia) Sean Quinlan | PA | All |
| (United States) Stephen Cameron Racing | BMW M4 GT4 | 119 | (United States) Gregory Liefooghe | PA | 1–6 |
| (United States) Stephen Cameron Racing | BMW M4 GT4 | 119 | (United States) Tom Dyer | PA | 7 |
| (United States) Stephen Cameron Racing | Porsche 718 Cayman GT4 Clubsport | 619 | (United States) Alain Stad | Am | 4–6 |
| (United States) Stephen Cameron Racing | Porsche 718 Cayman GT4 Clubsport | 619 | (United States) Thomas Merrill | Am | 4–5 |
| (United States) Stephen Cameron Racing | Porsche 718 Cayman GT4 Clubsport | 619 | (United States) Robb Todd | Am | 6 |
| (United States) Premier Racing | Porsche 718 Cayman GT4 Clubsport | 120 | (United States) Adam Adelson | PA | 4–6 |
| (United States) Premier Racing | Porsche 718 Cayman GT4 Clubsport | 120 | (United States) Elliott Skeer | PA | 4–6 |
| (United States) RHC Jorgensen / Strom | BMW M4 GT4 | 450 | (United States) Daren Jorgensen | PA | 1–2 |
| (United States) RHC Jorgensen / Strom | BMW M4 GT4 | 450 | (United States) Brett Strom | PA | 1–2 |
| (United States) Zelus Motorsports (Note: At Indianapolis, Harward and Isaac competed in Race #1, while Whalen and Isaac competed in Race #2) | Aston Martin Vantage AMR GT4 | 888 | (United States) Jason Harward | Am | 7 |
| (United States) Zelus Motorsports | Aston Martin Vantage AMR GT4 | 888 | (United States) Tigh Isaac | Am | 7 |
| (United States) Zelus Motorsports | Aston Martin Vantage AMR GT4 | 888 | (United States) Sean Whalen | Am | 7 |
| (United States) CarBahn Motorsports with Peregrine Racing | Audi R8 LMS GT4 Evo | 930 | (United States) Tom Dyer | PA | 2–6 |
| (United States) CarBahn Motorsports with Peregrine Racing | Audi R8 LMS GT4 Evo | 930 | (United States) Mark Siegel | PA | 2, 4 |
| (United States) CarBahn Motorsports with Peregrine Racing | Audi R8 LMS GT4 Evo | 930 | (United States) Tyler McQuarrie | PA | 3 |
| (United States) CarBahn Motorsports with Peregrine Racing | Audi R8 LMS GT4 Evo | 930 | (United States) Sameer Gandhi | PA | 5–6 |

| Icon | Class |
|---|---|
| S | Silver Cup |
| PA | Pro-Am Cup |
| Am | Am Cup |

== Race results ==
Bold indicates overall winner.

| Round | | Circuit | Pole position | Silver Winners | Pro-Am Winners | Am Winners |
|---|---|---|---|---|---|---|
| 1 | R1 | (United States) Sonoma | (United States) No. 47 Nolasport | (United States) No. 062 Dexter Racing | (United States) **No. 47 Nolasport** | (United States) No. 46 Nolasport |
| 1 | R1 | (United States) Sonoma | (United States) Jason Hart (United States) Matt Travis | (United States) Ryan Dexter (United States) Warren Dexter | (United States) **Jason Hart** (United States) **Matt Travis** | (United States) Patrick Byrne (United States) Russell Walker |
| 1 | R2 | (United States) Sonoma | (United States) No. 47 Nolasport | (United States) No. 72 Murillo Racing | **(United States) No. 47 Nolasport** | (United States) No. 68 TGR Smooge Racing |
| 1 | R2 | (United States) Sonoma | (United States) Jason Hart (United States) Matt Travis | (United States) Kenny Murillo (United States) Christian Szymczak | (United States) **Jason Hart** (United States) **Matt Travis** | (United States) Kevin Conway (United States) John Geesbreght |
| 2 | R1 | (United States) Austin | (United States) No. 47 Nolasport | (United States) No. 94 Bimmerworld Racing | **(United States) No. 47 Nolasport** | (United States) No. 68 TGR Smooge Racing |
| 2 | R1 | (United States) Austin | (United States) Jason Hart (United States) Matt Travis | (United States) Chandler Hull (United States) Jon Miller | (United States) **Jason Hart** (United States) **Matt Travis** | (United States) Kevin Conway (United States) John Geesbreght |
| 2 | R2 | (United States) Austin | (United States) No. 47 Nolasport | (United States) No. 72 Murillo Racing | **(United States) No. 47 Nolasport** | (United States) No. 7 Nolasport with OGH |
| 2 | R2 | (United States) Austin | (United States) Jason Hart (United States) Matt Travis | (United States) Kenny Murillo (United States) Christian Szymczak | (United States) **Jason Hart** (United States) **Matt Travis** | (United States) Sean Gibbons (United States) Sam Owen |
| 3 | R1 | (United States) Virginia | (United States) No. 47 Nolasport | **(United States) No. 72 Murillo Racing** | (United States) No. 47 Nolasport | (United States) No. 68 TGR Smooge Racing |
| 3 | R1 | (United States) Virginia | (United States) Jason Hart (United States) Matt Travis | (United States) **Kenny Murillo** (United States) **Christian Szymczak** | (United States) Jason Hart (United States) Matt Travis | (United States) Kevin Conway (United States) John Geesbreght |
| 3 | R2 | (United States) Virginia | (United States) No. 00 Notlad Racing by RS1 | (United States) No. 11 Classic BMW | **(United States) No. 15 BSport Racing** | (United States) No. 16 Capstone Motorsports |
| 3 | R2 | (United States) Virginia | (United States) Matt Dalton (United States) Patrick Gallagher | (United States) Toby Grahovec (United Kingdom) Stevan McAleer | **(United States) Kenton Koch** **(United States) Bryan Putt** | (United States) John Allen (United States) Kris Wilson |
| 4 | R1 | (United States) Road America | (United States) No. 11 Classic BMW | (United States) No. 72 Murillo Racing | **(United States) No. 34 Bimmerworld Racing** | (United States) No. 68 TGR Smooge Racing |
| 4 | R1 | (United States) Road America | (United States) Toby Grahovec (United Kingdom) Stevan McAleer | (United States) Kenny Murillo (United States) Christian Szymczak | **(United States) Bill Auberlen** **(United States) James Walker** | (United States) Kevin Conway (United States) John Geesbreght |
| 4 | R2 | (United States) Road America | (United States) No. 119 Stephen Cameron Racing | (Canada) No. 28 ST Racing | **(United States) No. 119 Stephen Cameron Racing** | (United States) No. 111 Motorsports USA |
| 4 | R2 | (United States) Road America | (United States) Gregory Liefooghe (Australia) Sean Quinlan | (United States) Harry Gottsacker (United States) Tyler Maxson | **(United States) Gregory Liefooghe** **(Australia) Sean Quinlan** | (United States) Todd Clarke (United States) Ty Clarke |
| 5 | R1 | (United States) Watkins Glen | (United States) No. 16 Capstone Motorsports | (United States) No. 72 Murillo Racing | **(United States) No. 52 AutoTechnic Racing** | (United States) No. 68 TGR Smooge Racing |
| 5 | R1 | (United States) Watkins Glen | (United States) John Allen (United States) Kris Wilson | (United States) Kenny Murillo (United States) Christian Szymczak | **(United States) John Capestro-Dubets** **(United States) Tom Capizzi** | (United States) Kevin Conway (United States) John Geesbreght |
| 5 | R2 | (United States) Watkins Glen | (United States) No. 66 The Racer's Group | **(United States) No. 11 Classic BMW** | (United States) No. 24 Heart of Racing Team | (United States) No. 68 TGR Smooge Racing |
| 5 | R2 | (United States) Watkins Glen | (United States) Derek DeBoer (United States) Spencer Pumpelly | **(United States) Toby Grahovec** **(United Kingdom) Stevan McAleer** | (United States) Ian James (United States) Gray Newell | (United States) Kevin Conway (United States) John Geesbreght |
| 6 | R1 | (United States) Sebring | (United States) No. 11 Classic BMW | **(United States) No. 35 Conquest Racing West** | (United States) No. 47 Nolasport | (United States) No. 98 Random Vandals Racing |
| 6 | R1 | (United States) Sebring | (United States) Toby Grahovec (United Kingdom) Stevan McAleer | **(United States) Colin Mullan** **(United States) Michai Stephens** | (United States) Jason Hart (United States) Matt Travis | (United States) Al Carter (United States) Paul Sparta |
| 6 | R2 | (United States) Sebring | (United States) No. 34 Bimmerworld Racing | **(United States) No. 35 Conquest Racing West** | (United States) No. 47 Nolasport | (United States) No. 68 TGR Smooge Racing |
| 6 | R2 | (United States) Sebring | (United States) Bill Auberlen (United States) James Walker | **(United States) Colin Mullan** **(United States) Michai Stephens** | (United States) Jason Hart (United States) Matt Travis | (United States) Kevin Conway (United States) John Geesbreght |
| 7 | R1 | (United States) Indianapolis | (United States) No. 11 Classic BMW | **(United States) No. 35 Conquest Racing West** | (United States) No. 47 Nolasport | (United States) No. 68 TGR Smooge Racing |
| 7 | R1 | (United States) Indianapolis | (United States) Toby Grahovec (United Kingdom) Stevan McAleer | **(United States) Colin Mullan** **(United States) Michai Stephens** | (United States) Jason Hart (United States) Matt Travis | (United States) Kevin Conway (United States) John Geesbreght |
| 7 | R2 | (United States) Indianapolis | (United States) No. 59 WR Racing | **(United States) No. 35 Conquest Racing West** | (United States) No. 47 Nolasport | (United States) No. 68 TGR Smooge Racing |
| 7 | R2 | (United States) Indianapolis | (France) Valentin Hasse-Clot (United States) Paul Terry | **(United States) Colin Mullan** **(United States) Michai Stephens** | (United States) Jason Hart (United States) Matt Travis | (United States) Kevin Conway (United States) John Geesbreght |

== Championship standings ==
Scoring system

Championship points are awarded for the first ten positions in each race. Entries are required to complete 75% of the winning car's race distance in order to be classified and earn points. Individual drivers are required to participate for a minimum of 25 minutes in order to earn championship points in any SprintX race.

| Position | **1st** | **2nd** | **3rd** | **4th** | **5th** | **6th** | **7th** | **8th** | **9th** | **10th** |
| Points | 25 | 18 | 15 | 12 | 10 | 8 | 6 | 4 | 2 | 1 |

=== Driver's championships ===
| Pos. | Driver | Team | SON (United States) | | AUS (United States) | | VIR (United States) | | ELK (United States) | | WGL (United States) | | SEB (United States) | | IMS (United States) | | Points |
| Pos. | Driver | Team | RC1 | RC2 | RC1 | RC2 | RC1 | RC2 | RC1 | RC2 | RC1 | RC2 | RC1 | RC2 | RC1 | RC2 | Points |
Silver Cup
| 1 | (United States) Kenny Murillo (United States) Christian Szymczak | (United States) Murillo Racing | 3 | **2** | **Ret** | 2 | **1** | **Ret** | 5 | 11 | **2** | 9 | 4 | 6 | 2 | 2 | 243 |
| 2 | (United States) Tim Barber (United States) Cole Ciraulo | (United States) CCR Racing / Team TFB | 8 | 15 | 15 | 18 | 7 | 6 | 6 | 27 | 17 | 7 | 17 | 15 | 12 | 20 | 176 |
| 3 | (United States) Colin Mullan (United States) Michai Stephens | (United States) Conquest Racing West | | | | | | | 12 | 14 | 11 | **2** | 1 | **1** | 1 | **1** | 163 |
| 4 | (United Kingdom) Stevan McAleer (United States) Toby Grahovec | (United States) Classic BMW | | | 11 | 4 | 5 | 2 | **36** | Ret | 26 | 1 | **5** | 28 | **3** | 22 | 159 |
| 5 | (United States) Ryan Dexter (United States) Warren Dexter | (United States) Dexter Racing | **2** | 4 | 25 | 8 | Ret | DNS | 18 | 26 | 12 | 8 | 8 | 20 | 23 | 4 | 154 |
| 6 | (United States) Chandler Hull (United States) Jon Miller | (United States) Bimmerworld Racing | 18 | 31 | 7 | **Ret** | 11 | 7 | 14 | NC | 25 | 11 | | | 7 | 5 | 122 |
| 7 | (United States) Tomas Mejia | (Canada) ST Racing | 27 | 18 | 17 | 12 | 17 | 10 | 22 | 18 | | | | | | | 74 |
| 8 | (United States) Nicolai Elghanayan (Norway) Mads Siljehaug | (United States) Marco Polo Motorsports | 9 | 6 | 19 | 9 | 14 | 22 | | | | | | | | | 67 |
| 9 | (United States) Nick Wittmer | (Canada) ST Racing | | | 17 | 12 | 17 | 10 | | | | | | | | | 40 |
| 10 | (United States) Bryson Lew | (Canada) ST Racing | 27 | 18 | | | | | 22 | 18 | | | | | | | 34 |
| 11 | (United States) Harry Gottsacker (United States) Tyler Maxson | (Canada) ST Racing | | | | | | | 34 | 7 | | | | | | | 29 |
| 12 | (United States) Chad McCumbee (United States) James Pesek | (United States) PF Racing | | | | | | | 11 | **17** | | | | | | | 27 |
| 13 | (Bulgaria) Vesko Kozarov (United States) Jeff Westphal | (United States) Rearden Racing | | | 9 | 22 | | | | | | | | | | | 24 |
Pro-Am Cup
| 1 | (United States) Jason Hart (United States) Matt Travis | (United States) Nolasport | **1** | **1** | **1** | **1** | **2** | 3 | 7 | 15 | DNS | 6 | **2** | 2 | 4 | 3 | 267 |
| 2 | (United States) Kenton Koch (United States) Bryan Putt | (United States) BSport Racing | 4 | 8 | 18 | 6 | 9 | 1 | 13 | 3 | 6 | 17 | 9 | 8 | 5 | 7 | 158 |
| 3 | (Australia) Sean Quinlan | (United States) Stephen Cameron Racing | 6 | 9 | 34 | 3 | 3 | 23 | 8 | **1** | 7 | Ret | 6 | 7 | 8 | 13 | 141 |
| 4 | (United States) Tom Capizzi (United States) John Capestro-Dubets | (United States) AutoTechnic Racing | | | 5 | 15 | 8 | 19 | **2** | 2 | 1 | 5 | 21 | 10 | 10 | 9 | 128 |
| 5 | (United States) Gregory Liefooghe | (United States) Stephen Cameron Racing | 6 | 9 | 34 | 3 | 3 | 23 | 8 | **1** | 7 | Ret | 6 | 7 | | | 125 |
| 6 | (United States) Bill Auberlen (United States) James Walker | (United States) Bimmerworld Racing | 7 | 27 | 4 | Ret | 16 | 24 | 1 | 4 | 8 | 4 | 15 | **4** | 9 | Ret | 110 |
| 7 | (United States) Paul Terry | (United States) WR Racing | 10 | 3 | 12 | 7 | 4 | 12 | Ret | Ret | 4 | Ret | 16 | 13 | 6 | **23**^{†} | 95 |
| 8 | (Netherlands) Jeroen Bleekemolen (United States) Tim Pappas | (United States) Black Swan Racing | 11 | 7 | 2 | 21 | Ret | DNS | 24 | 5 | | | 3 | 3 | | | 85 |
| 9 | (United States) Derek DeBoer (United States) Spencer Pumpelly | (United States) The Racer's Group | 19 | 5 | 10 | 14 | 6 | 4 | 4 | 20 | 10 | **27** | | | 17 | 12 | 75 |
| 10 | (United States) James Clay (United States) Nick Galante | (United States) Bimmerworld Racing | 25 | 12 | 13 | Ret | Ret | 5 | 3 | 23 | 9 | 13 | 7 | 18 | **11** | 8 | 74 |
| 11 | (United States) Jason Bell (United States) Andrew Davis | (United States) GMG Racing | 12 | 11 | 6 | Ret | 13 | 8 | 9 | 12 | 13 | 12 | 13 | 9 | 13 | 10 | 71 |
| 12 | (United States) Brandon Davis | (United States) WR Racing | 10 | 3 | 12 | 7 | 4 | 12 | Ret | Ret | | | | | | | 65 |
| 13 | (United States) Ian James (United States) Gray Newell | (United States) Heart of Racing Team | 20 | 22 | 20 | 19 | 15 | 21 | 25 | 9 | 3 | 3 | 26 | 27 | 14 | 11 | 63 |
| 14 | (United States) Ross Chouest (Canada) Aaron Povoledo | (United States) RENNtech Motorsports | 16 | 16 | 3 | 5 | 22 | 25 | 17 | DNS | | | | | | | 49 |
| 14 | (United States) Ross Chouest (Canada) Aaron Povoledo | (United States) 3R Povoledo Racing | | | | | | | | | 5 | 20 | 14 | DNS | | | 49 |
| 15 | (United States) Chris Cagnazzi (United States) Guy Cosmo | (United States) RENNtech Motorsports | | | 36 | Ret | 10 | 17 | 10 | DNS | | | 11 | 12 | 15 | 14 | 26 |
| 16 | (United States) Tom Dyer | (United States) CarBahn Motorsports with Peregrine Racing | | | 32 | 30 | | | 19 | 8 | DNS | 25 | 22 | 25 | | | 24 |
| 16 | (United States) Tom Dyer | (United States) Stephen Cameron Racing | | | | | | | | | | | | | 8 | 13 | 24 |
| 17 | (United States) Adam Adelson (United States) Elliott Skeer | (United States) Premier Racing | | | | | | | 21 | 16 | **14** | 28 | 12 | 5 | | | 17 |
| 18 | (United States) Owen Trinkler | (United States) Rearden Racing | | | 24 | 29 | | | | | | | | | | | 15 |
| 18 | (United States) Owen Trinkler | (United States) WR Racing | | | | | | | | | 4 | Ret | 16 | 13 | | | 15 |
| 18 | (France) Valentin Hasse-Clot | (United States) WR Racing | | | | | | | | | | | | | 6 | **23**^{†} | 15 |
| 19 | (United States) Charlie Belluardo (United States) Trent Hindman | (United States) RS1 | | | | | | | | | Ret | 10 | | | | | 10 |
| 19 | (United States) Mark Siegel | (United States) CarBahn Motorsports with Peregrine Racing | | | 32 | 30 | 21 | 20 | 19 | 8 | | | | | | | 10 |
| 19 | (United States) Christopher Gumprecht (Canada) Kyle Marcelli | (United States) RENNtech Motorsports | | | | | | | DNS | 22 | 16 | 24 | 10 | 16 | Ret | 15 | 10 |
| 20 | (United States) Ryan Eversley (United States) Joe Rubbo | (Canada) ST Racing | 24 | 25 | 35 | 10 | | | | | | | | | | | 8 |
| 20 | (United States) Matt Dalton (United States) Patrick Gallagher | (United States) Notlad Racing by RS1 | 14 | 33 | Ret | 25 | 12 | **DNS** | | | | | | | | | 8 |
| 21 | (United States) Kris McCoy (United States) Jeff Westphal | (United States) Rearden Racing | 23 | 10 | | | | | | | | | | | | | 6 |
| 22 | (United States) Andy Lee (United States) Elias Sabo | (United States) GMG Racing | 29 | 26 | 16 | 26 | | | | | | | 25 | 11 | | | 3 |
| 23 | (United States) Tyler McQuarrie | (United States) CarBahn Motorsports with Peregrine Racing | | | | | 21 | 20 | | | | | | | | | 2 |
| | (United States) Daren Jorgensen (United States) Brett Strom | (United States) RHC Jorgensen / Storm | 30 | 32 | 28 | 28 | | | | | | | | | | | 0 |
| | (United States) Dmitri Novikov | (United States) Rearden Racing | | | 24 | 29 | | | | | | | | | | | 0 |
| | (United States) Sameer Gandhi | (United States) CarBahn Motorsports with Peregrine Racing | | | | | | | | | DNS | 25 | 22 | 25 | | | 0 |
Am Cup
| 1 | (United States) Kevin Conway (United States) John Geesbreght | (United States) TGR Smooge Racing | 15 | 13 | 8 | 17 | **18** | 11 | 15 | 10 | 15 | 14 | 20 | 14 | 16 | **18** | 303 |
| 2 | (United States) Kris Wilson | (United States) Capstone Motorsports | 13 | **14** | 14 | **Ret** | 20 | 9 | **30** | 19 | **Ret** | 15 | **19** | 26 | **22** | 18 | 168 |
| 3 | (United States) Paul Sparta | (United States) Random Vandals Racing | 28 | 30 | 21 | 20 | 19 | 13 | 23 | Ret | 19 | 26 | 18 | 17 | Ret | 16 | 152 |
| 4 | (United States) John Allen | (United States) Capstone Motorsports | 13 | **14** | 14 | **Ret** | 20 | 9 | **30** | 19 | **Ret** | 15 | | | | | 126 |
| 5 | (United States) Russell Walker | (United States) Nolasport | **5** | 17 | 27 | 23 | Ret | **16** | 20 | **30** | 18 | 16 | Ret | **23** | | | 119 |
| 5 | (United States) Al Carter | (United States) Random Vandals Racing | 28 | 30 | 21 | 20 | | | 23 | Ret | 19 | 26 | 18 | 17 | Ret | 16 | 119 |
| 6 | (United States) Sean Gibbons (United States) Sam Owen | (United States) Nolasport with OGH | 26 | 24 | 26 | 11 | Ret | 14 | 35 | 32 | 20 | 19 | 28 | 21 | Ret | Ret | 95 |
| 7 | (United States) Matt Forbush (Canada) Damon Surzyshyn | (United States) TGR Forbush Performance | 32 | 29 | 30 | 27 | 23 | 18 | 28 | 24 | DNS | DNS | 23 | 24 | 20 | 19 | 80 |
| 8 | (United States) David Walker | (United States) Nolasport | | | 27 | 23 | Ret | **16** | 20 | **30** | 18 | 16 | Ret | **23** | | | 79 |
| 9 | (United States) Alain Stad | (United States) Stephen Cameron Racing | | | | | | | 16 | 13 | 21 | **18** | 27 | 19 | | | 78 |
| 10 | (United States) Todd Clarke (United States) Ty Clarke | (United States) Motorsports USA | 21 | 23 | 23 | 31 | | | 31 | 6 | 22 | 21 | | | | | 70 |
| 11 | (United States) Michael McAleenan | (United States) Motorsports USA | 17 | 21 | **29** | 16 | | | 27 | 21 | 23 | 22 | | | | | 69 |
| 12 | (United States) Thomas Merrill | (United States) Stephen Cameron Racing | | | | | | | 16 | 13 | 21 | **18** | | | | | 55 |
| 13 | (United States) Paul Kiebler (United States) Mikel Miller | (United States) Automatic Racing | | | | | | | 29 | 29 | 24 | 23 | 24 | 22 | 18 | Ret | 52 |
| 14 | (United States) Jerold Lowe | (United States) Motorsports USA | 17 | 21 | 22 | 13 | | | | | | | | | | | 50 |
| 15 | (United States) Dan Rogers | (United States) Motorsports USA | | | **29** | 16 | | | 27 | 21 | 23 | 22 | | | | | 49 |
| 16 | (United States) Cavan O'Keefe | (United States) Motorsports USA | 22 | 20 | 22 | 13 | | | 33 | 31 | | | | | | | 48 |
| 17 | (United States) James Rappaport | (United States) The Racer's Group | 31 | 28 | 33 | Ret | 24 | 15 | 32 | 28 | | | | | 21 | 21 | 46 |
| 18 | (United States) Jon Berry | (United States) Capstone Motorsports | | | | | | | | | | | **19** | 26 | **22** | 18 | 42 |
| 18 | (United States) Todd Hetherington | (United States) The Racer's Group | | | 33 | Ret | 24 | 15 | 32 | 28 | | | | | 21 | 21 | 42 |
| 19 | (United States) Patrick Byrne | (United States) Nolasport | **5** | 17 | | | | | | | | | | | | | 40 |
| 20 | (United States) Andrew Wikstrom | (United States) Random Vandals Racing | | | | | 19 | 13 | | | | | | | | | 33 |
| 21 | (United States) Tigh Isaac | (United States) Zelus Motorsports | | | | | | | | | | | | | 19 | 17 | 30 |
| 22 | (United States) Robb Todd | (United States) Stephen Cameron Racing | | | | | | | | | | | 27 | 19 | | | 23 |
| 23 | (United States) Aurora Straus | (United States) Murillo Racing | Ret | 19 | 31 | 24 | | | | | | | | | | | 19 |
| 24 | (United States) Memo Gidley | (United States) Motorsports USA | 22 | 20 | | | | | | | | | | | | | 18 |
| 25 | (United States) Anthony Geraci | (United States) Nolasport | | | | | | | 26 | 25 | | | | | | | 16 |
| 25 | (United States) Dominic Starkweather | (United States) Nolasport | | | | | | | 26 | 25 | Ret | DNS | | | | | 16 |
| 26 | (United States) Jason Harward | (United States) Zelus Motorsports | | | | | | | | | | | | | 19 | | 15 |
| 26 | (United States) Sean Whalen | (United States) Zelus Motorsports | | | | | | | | | | | | | | 17 | 15 |
| 27 | (Denmark) Christina Nielsen | (United States) Murillo Racing | Ret | 19 | | | | | | | | | | | | | 12 |
| 28 | (United States) Jeff Mosing | (United States) Murillo Racing | | | 31 | 24 | | | | | | | | | | | 7 |
| 29 | (United States) Robert Orcutt | (United States) The Racer's Group | 31 | 28 | | | | | | | | | | | | | 4 |
| | (United States) Jason Alexandridis | (United States) Motorsports USA | | | | | | | 33 | 31 | | | | | | | 0 |
| | (United States) Jason Alexandridis | (United States) Nolasport | | | | | | | | | Ret | DNS | | | | | 0 |
| Pos. | Driver | Team | SON (United States) | | AUS (United States) | | VIR (United States) | | ELK (United States) | | WGL (United States) | | SEB (United States) | | IMS (United States) | | Points |

Key
| Colour | Result |
|---|---|
| Gold | Race winner |
| Silver | 2nd place |
| Bronze | 3rd place |
| Green | Points finish |
| Blue | Non-points finish |
| Blue | Non-classified finish (NC) |
| Purple | Did not finish (Ret) |
| Black | Disqualified (DSQ) |
| Black | Excluded (EX) |
| White | Did not start (DNS) |
| White | Race cancelled (C) |
| White | Withdrew (WD) |
| Blank | Did not participate |

**Bold** – Pole
Italics – Fastest Lap

†: Post-event penalty. Car moved to back of class.

=== Team's championships ===
| Pos. | Team | Manufacturer | SON (United States) | | AUS (United States) | | VIR (United States) | | ELK (United States) | | WGL (United States) | | SEB (United States) | | IMS (United States) | | Points |
| Pos. | Team | Manufacturer | RC1 | RC2 | RC1 | RC2 | RC1 | RC2 | RC1 | RC2 | RC1 | RC2 | RC1 | RC2 | RC1 | RC2 | Points |
Silver Cup
| 1 | (United States) Murillo Racing | (Germany) Mercedes-AMG | 3 | **2** | **Ret** | 2 | **1** | **Ret** | 5 | 11 | **2** | 9 | 4 | 6 | 2 | 2 | 243 |
| 2 | (United States) CCR Racing / Team TFB | (Germany) BMW | 8 | 15 | 15 | 18 | 7 | 6 | 6 | 27 | 17 | 7 | 17 | 15 | 12 | 20 | 176 |
| 3 | (United States) Conquest Racing West | (Germany) Mercedes-AMG | | | | | | | 12 | 14 | 11 | **2** | 1 | **1** | 1 | **1** | 163 |
| 4 | (United States) Classic BMW | (Germany) BMW | | | 11 | 4 | 5 | 2 | **36** | Ret | 26 | 1 | **5** | 28 | **3** | 22 | 159 |
| 5 | (United States) Dexter Racing | (United Kingdom) Aston Martin | **2** | 4 | 25 | 8 | Ret | DNS | 18 | 26 | 12 | 8 | 8 | 20 | 23 | 4 | 154 |
| 6 | (United States) Bimmerworld Racing | (Germany) BMW | 18 | 31 | 7 | **Ret** | 11 | 7 | 14 | NC | 25 | 11 | | | 7 | 5 | 122 |
| 7 | (Canada) ST Racing | (Germany) BMW | 27 | 18 | 17 | 12 | 17 | 10 | 22 | 7 | | | | | | | 89 |
| 8 | (United States) Marco Polo Motorsports | (Austria) KTM | 9 | 6 | 19 | 9 | 14 | 22 | | | | | | | | | 67 |
| 9 | (United States) PF Racing | (United States) Ford | | | | | | | 11 | **17** | | | | | | | 27 |
| 10 | (United States) Rearden Racing | (Germany) Audi | | | 9 | 22 | | | | | | | | | | | 24 |
Pro-Am Cup
| 1 | (United States) Nolasport | (Germany) Porsche | **1** | **1** | **1** | **1** | **2** | 3 | 7 | 15 | DNS | 6 | **2** | 2 | 4 | 3 | 267 |
| 2 | (United States) BSport Racing | (United Kingdom) Aston Martin | 4 | 8 | 18 | 6 | 9 | 1 | 13 | 3 | 6 | 17 | 9 | 8 | 5 | 7 | 158 |
| 3 | (United States) Stephen Cameron Racing | (Germany) BMW | 6 | 9 | 34 | 3 | 3 | 23 | 8 | **1** | 7 | Ret | 6 | 7 | 8 | 13 | 141 |
| 4 | (United States) Bimmerworld Racing | (Germany) BMW | 7 | 12 | 4 | Ret | 16 | 5 | 1 | 4 | 8 | 4 | 7 | **4** | **11** | 8 | 132 |
| 5 | (United States) AutoTechnic Racing | (Germany) BMW | | | 5 | 15 | 8 | 19 | **2** | 2 | 1 | 5 | 21 | 10 | 10 | 9 | 128 |
| 6 | (United States) WR Racing | (United Kingdom) Aston Martin | 10 | 3 | 12 | 7 | 4 | 12 | Ret | Ret | 4 | Ret | 16 | 13 | 6 | **23**^{†} | 95 |
| 7 | (United States) RENNtech Motorsports | (Germany) Mercedes-AMG | 16 | 16 | 3 | 5 | 10 | 17 | 10 | DNS | 16 | 24 | 10 | 12 | 15 | 14 | 87 |
| 8 | (United States) Black Swan Racing | (Germany) Porsche | 11 | 7 | 2 | 21 | Ret | DNS | 24 | 5 | | | 3 | 3 | | | 85 |
| 9 | (United States) The Racer's Group | (Germany) Porsche | 19 | 5 | 10 | 14 | 6 | 4 | 4 | 20 | 10 | **27** | | | 17 | 12 | 75 |
| 10 | (United States) GMG Racing | (United Kingdom) Aston Martin (Germany) Audi | 12 | 11 | 6 | 26 | 13 | 8 | 9 | 12 | 13 | 12 | 13 | 9 | 13 | 10 | 71 |
| 11 | (United States) Heart of Racing Team | (United Kingdom) Aston Martin | 20 | 22 | 20 | 19 | 15 | 21 | 25 | 9 | 3 | 3 | 26 | 27 | 14 | 11 | 63 |
| 12 | (United States) 3R Povoledo Racing | (United Kingdom) Aston Martin | | | | | | | | | 5 | 20 | 14 | DNS | | | 49 |
| 13 | (United States) CarBahn with Peregrine Racing | (Germany) Audi | | | 32 | 30 | 21 | 20 | 19 | 8 | DNS | 25 | 22 | 25 | | | 24 |
| 14 | (United States) Premier Racing | (Germany) Porsche | | | | | | | 21 | 16 | **14** | 28 | 12 | 5 | | | 17 |
| 15 | (United States) RS1 | (Germany) Porsche | | | | | | | | | Ret | 10 | | | | | 10 |
| 16 | (Canada) ST Racing | (Germany) BMW | 24 | 25 | 35 | 10 | | | | | | | | | | | 8 |
| 17 | (United States) Notlad Racing by RS1 | (United Kingdom) Aston Martin | 14 | 33 | Ret | 25 | 12 | **DNS** | | | | | | | | | 8 |
| 18 | (United States) Rearden Racing | (Germany) Audi | 23 | 10 | 24 | 29 | | | | | | | | | | | 6 |
| 19 | (United States) RHC Jorgensen / Strom | (Germany) BMW | 30 | 32 | 28 | 28 | | | | | | | | | | | 0 |
Am Cup
| 1 | (United States) TGR Smooge Racing | (Japan) Toyota | 15 | 13 | 8 | 17 | **18** | 11 | 15 | 10 | 15 | 14 | 20 | 14 | 16 | **18** | 303 |
| 2 | (United States) Capstone Motorsports | (Germany) Mercedes-AMG | 13 | **14** | 14 | **Ret** | 20 | 9 | **30** | 19 | **Ret** | 15 | **19** | 26 | **22** | 18 | 168 |
| 3 | (United States) Random Vandals Racing | (Germany) BMW | 28 | 30 | 21 | 20 | 19 | 13 | 23 | Ret | 19 | 26 | 18 | 17 | Ret | 16 | 152 |
| 4 | (United States) Nolasport | (Germany) Porsche | **5** | 17 | 26 | 11 | Ret | **14** | 20 | **25** | 18 | 16 | 28 | **21** | Ret | Ret | 123 |
| 5 | (United States) Motorsport USA | (United Kingdom) McLaren | 17 | 20 | **22** | 13 | | | 27 | 6 | 22 | 21 | | | | | 116 |
| 6 | (United States) TGR Forbush Performance | (Japan) Toyota | 32 | 29 | 30 | 27 | 23 | 18 | 28 | 24 | DNS | DNS | 23 | 24 | 20 | 19 | 80 |
| 7 | (United States) Stephen Cameron Racing | (Germany) Porsche | | | | | | | 16 | 13 | 21 | **18** | 27 | 19 | | | 78 |
| 8 | (United States) The Racer's Group | (Germany) Porsche | 31 | 28 | 33 | Ret | 24 | 15 | 32 | 28 | | | | | 21 | 21 | 68 |
| 9 | (United States) Automatic Racing | (United Kingdom) Aston Martin | | | | | | | 29 | 29 | 24 | 23 | 24 | 22 | 18 | Ret | 52 |
| 10 | (United States) Zelus Motorsports | (United Kingdom) Aston Martin | | | | | | | | | | | | | 19 | 17 | 30 |
| 11 | (United States) Murillo Racing | (Germany) Porsche | Ret | 19 | 31 | 24 | | | | | | | | | | | 28 |
| Pos. | Team | Manufacturer | SON (United States) | | AUS (United States) | | VIR (United States) | | ELK (United States) | | WGL (United States) | | SEB (United States) | | IMS (United States) | | Points |

== See also ==
- 2021 GT World Challenge America
