= Bryan Ortiz =

Puerto Rican racing driver (born 1989)

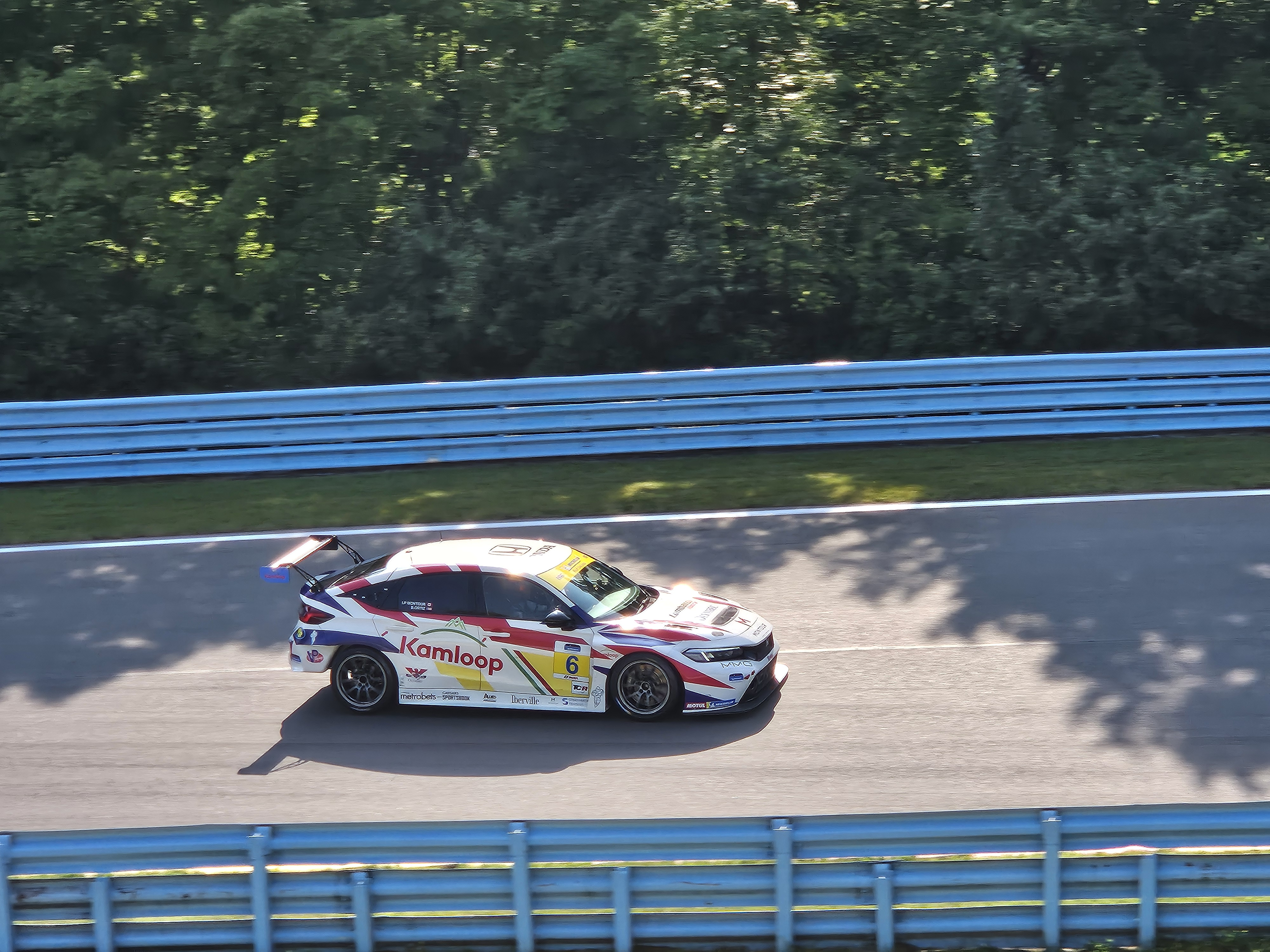
- Ortiz's No. 6 car at Watkins Glen International in 2024
- Born: February 10, 1989 (age 37); Bayamon, Puerto Rico

ARCA Menards Series East career
- 30 races run over 3 years
- Best finish: 5th (2012)
- First race: 2012 Widow Wax 125 (Bristol)
- Last race: 2014 Kevin Whitaker Chevrolet 140 (Greenville-Pickens)
Wins	Top tens	Poles
0	15	0

ARCA Menards Series West career
- 1 race run over 1 year
- Best finish: 60th (2012)
- First race: 2012 Casino Arizona 50 (Phoenix)
Wins	Top tens	Poles
0	1	0
- Statistics up to date as of June 1, 2024.

Bryan Ortiz (born February 10, 1989) is a Puerto Rican professional auto racing driver who competes in the Michelin Pilot Challenge, driving the No. 6 Honda Civic Type R TCR for Montreal Motorsports Group. He has also competed in the NASCAR K&N Pro Series East and NASCAR K&N Pro Series West and is a former member of the Drive for Diversity program.

Ortiz competed in two full-time seasons in the NASCAR K&N Pro Series East for Rev Racing, driving the No. 4 Toyota, where he finished fifth in the points in 2012 after earning nine top-ten finishes with a best finish of third at Bowman Gray Stadium, and fourteenth in points in 2013 after getting six top-tens with a best finish of second at Virginia International Raceway. He made two more starts with the team in 2014 before moving to sport cars, where he has competed in series such as the TC America Series, the Lamborghini Super Trofeo North America, the Mazda MX-5 Cup, where he won the championship in 2019, and the Michelin Pilot Challenge.

== Motorsports results ==
=== NASCAR ===
(key) (Bold – Pole position awarded by qualifying time. Italics – Pole position earned by points standings or practice time. * – Most laps led.)

==== K&N Pro Series East ====
NASCAR K&N Pro Series East results
Year	Team	No.	Make	1	2	3	4	5	6	7	8	9	10	11	12	13	14	15	16	NKNPSEC	Pts	Ref
2012	Rev Racing	4	Toyota	BRI; 14	GRE; 11	RCH; 7	IOW; 10	BGS; 3	JFC; 27	LGY; 6	CNB; 5	COL; 6	IOW; 12	NHA; 6	DOV; 6	GRE; 6	CAR; 13			5th	484	
2013	Rev Racing	4	Toyota	BRI; 21	GRE; 24	FIF; 6	RCH; 15	BGS; 7	IOW; 10	LGY; 22	COL; 10	IOW; 26	VIR; 2	GRE; 13	NHA; 28	DOV; 27	RAL; 3			14th	402	
2014	Rev Racing	6	Toyota	NSM	DAY	BRI	GRE	RCH	IOW	BGS	FIF	LGY	NHA	COL	IOW	GLN	VIR; 19	GRE; 13	DOV	42nd	56	

==== K&N Pro Series West ====
NASCAR K&N Pro Series West results
Year	Team	No.	Make	1	2	3	4	5	6	7	8	9	10	11	12	13	14	15	NKNPSWC	Pts	Ref
2012	Rev Racing	4	Toyota	PHO	LHC	MMP	S99	IOW	BIR	LVS	SON	EVG	CNS	IOW	PIR	SMP	AAS	PHO; 8	60th	36	
