= Monticello Airport (New York) =

Coordinates: 41°37′21″N 074°42′05″W

- IATA: none; ICAO: none; FAA LID: N37

Summary
- Airport type: Public
- Owner: The Jefferson Development Partners
- Serves: Monticello, New York
- Elevation AMSL: 1,545 ft / 471 m
- Interactive map of Monticello Airport

Runways
Direction	Length		Surface
Direction	ft	m	Surface
1/19	2,595	791	Asphalt
15/33	2,072	632	Asphalt

Statistics (2005)
- Aircraft operations: 15,000
- Based aircraft: 34
- Source: Federal Aviation Administration

Monticello Airport (FAA LID: N37) was a public-use airport located two miles (3.2 km) south of the central business district of Monticello, a village in Sullivan County, New York, United States. It was privately owned by The Jefferson Development Partners.

== Facilities and aircraft ==
Monticello Airport covered an area of 700 acres (280 ha) which contained two asphalt paved runways: 1/19 measuring 2,595 ft × 40 ft (791 m × 12 m) and 15/33 measuring 2,072 ft × 24 ft (631.5 m × 7.3 m). For the 12-month period ending August 30, 2005, the airport had 15,000 general aviation aircraft operations, an average of 41 per day.

As of late 2006, the Monticello Motor Club was built on the property. While the Monticello Motor Club is a private country club for auto enthusiasts, the property remains a private operating airport that mostly serves helicopters and a few fixed wing landings each month by the club members.
