= Todd Lamb (racing driver) =

American racing driver

Todd Lamb (born May 30, 1970) is a professional American race car driver, engineer, and entrepreneur. He previously lived in Royal Oak, Michigan and currently resides in Atlanta, Georgia.

== Engineering ==
Lamb graduated from GMI Engineering & Management Institute in 1993 with a degree in mechanical engineering. He worked for ten years in the Detroit area as an automotive engineer, designing safety components for cars and light trucks.

== Entrepreneur ==
In 2002, Lamb became founder and publisher of the car magazine, Speed, Style, & Sound. In 2004, he became founder and publisher of the custom sportbike magazine 2Wheel Tuner. He sold his publishing company in 2007.

== Racing ==
Lamb began racing go-karts at the age of ten, and later in 1996, he graduated from Skip Barber Racing School. In 2007, Lamb won the national championship in Spec Miata with OPM Autosports and the 25 Hours of Thunderhill with BiggsB Racing. In 2008, Lamb won the national championship in Spec Miata with SafeRacer, the American Road Race of Champions at Road Atlanta with East Street Auto, and the 13 Hours at Virginia International Raceway with OPM Autosports. In 2009, competing in the Playboy Mazda MX-5 Cup series, Lamb set series records for number of poles (7), wins (8), and consecutive poles (5) on the way to winning the championship with Atlanta Motorsports Group. In 2010, as part of the MAZDASPEED Motorsports Development Ladder, Lamb competed in the Rolex Sports Car Series and Continental Tire Sports Car Challenge under Grand American Road Racing Association sanction, drove the Racers Edge Motorsports Mazda RX-8 in Roxel GT with Jordan Taylor during the 2010 Rolex Sports Car Series season, and drove the i-MOTO MAZDASPEED3 in ST with Glenn Bocchino during the 2010 Continental Tire Sports Car Challenge season. In 2014, Lamb won the 13 Hours at Virginia International Raceway with Elgin Racing.

Lamb is writing articles about his racing experience at SPEEDtv.com.

== Motorsports career results ==
=== SCCA National Championship Runoffs ===
Year	Track	Car	Engine	Class	Finish	Start	Status
2009	Road America	Mazda Miata	Mazda	Spec Miata	4	4	Running

=== American open-wheel racing results ===
(key)

==== Barber Dodge Pro Series ====
Barber Dodge Pro Series results
Year	1	2	3	4	5	6	7	8	9	10	11	12	Rank	Points
1998	SEB	LRP	DET	WGI	CLE	GRA	MDO	ROA	LS1	ATL	HMS	LS2; 29	40	–
