= Maximilian Opalski =

American Polish race car driver

Max Opalski
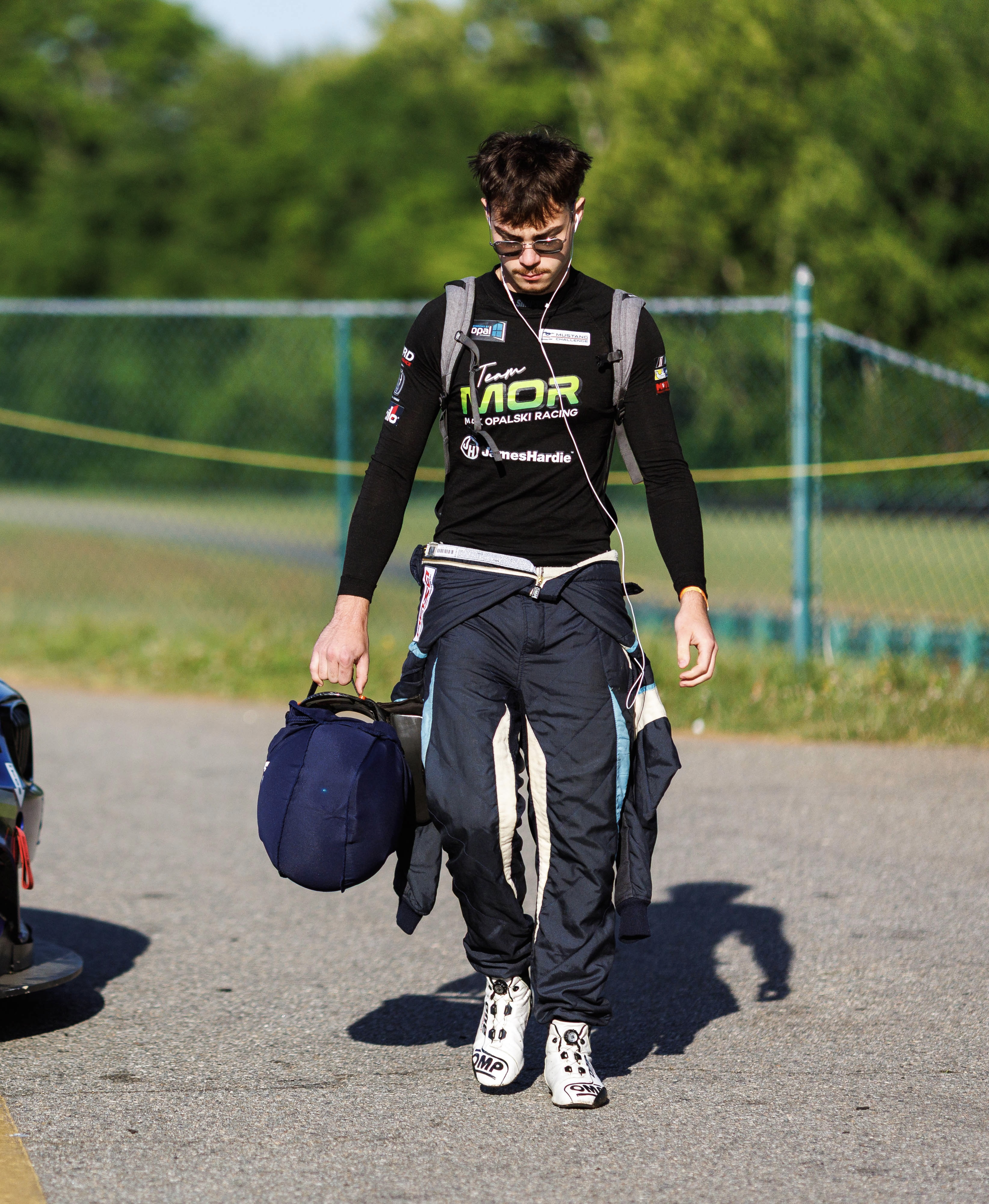
- Opalski in 2024
- Nationality: (Poland) Polish (United States) American via double nationality
- Born: November 10, 2005 (age 20); Chicago Illinois
- Categorisation: FIA Silver

Previous series
- 2022-2023 2024: IMSA MX5 Cup; IMSA Mustang Challenge

Maximilian Opalski (born November 10, 2005) is an American and Polish racing driver and team owner currently competing in sports car racing. He is known for his participation in the Idemitsu Mazda MX-5 Cup and the IMSA Ford Mustang Challenge, as well as for founding his own racing team.

== Early life and karting ==
Maximilian Opalski was born on November 10, 2005, in Chicago, Illinois, United States. He began racing at the age of five in karting, competing in regional series such as the World Karting Association (WKA) and Route 66 series. Through the late 2010s, he progressed through various karting classes, achieving multiple top-ten finishes at national events and podium results in regional competitions. In 2019, Opalski achieved notable success with multiple race victories and strong results with podium finishes in the United States Pro Kart Series and Challenge of the Americas.

== Transition to car racing and MX5 cup ==
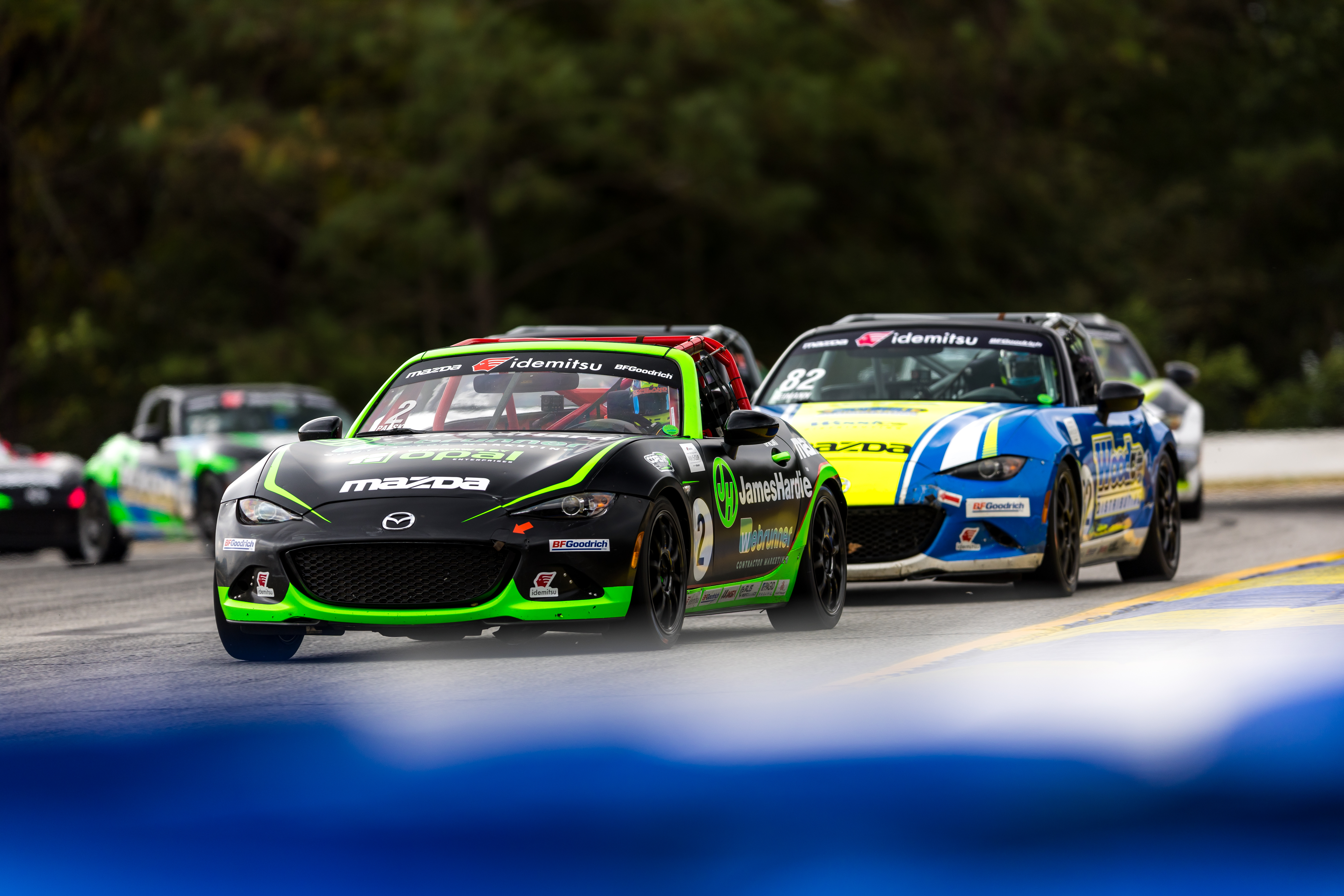
Max Opalski Driving MX5 Cup

Opalski transitioned from karting to sports car racing in 2022, joining Copeland Motorsports to compete in the Idemitsu Mazda MX-5 Cup presented by BF Goodrich. Competing at various tracks around the US, including tracks like The Streets of St. Petersburg, Virginia International Raceway, and Watkins Glen. Opalski finished the 2022 season with top-ten finishes at the Road Atlanta.

In 2023, Opalski returned to the Mazda MX5 Cup grid with Copeland Motorsports at Daytona International Speedway with a fifth-place result. He finished on the poduim twice that here in Road America and Road Atlanta with one pole position and a track record. Opalski finished the 2023 Mazda MX5 cup 4th place in the championship.

== Max Opalski Racing and Mustang Challenge ==
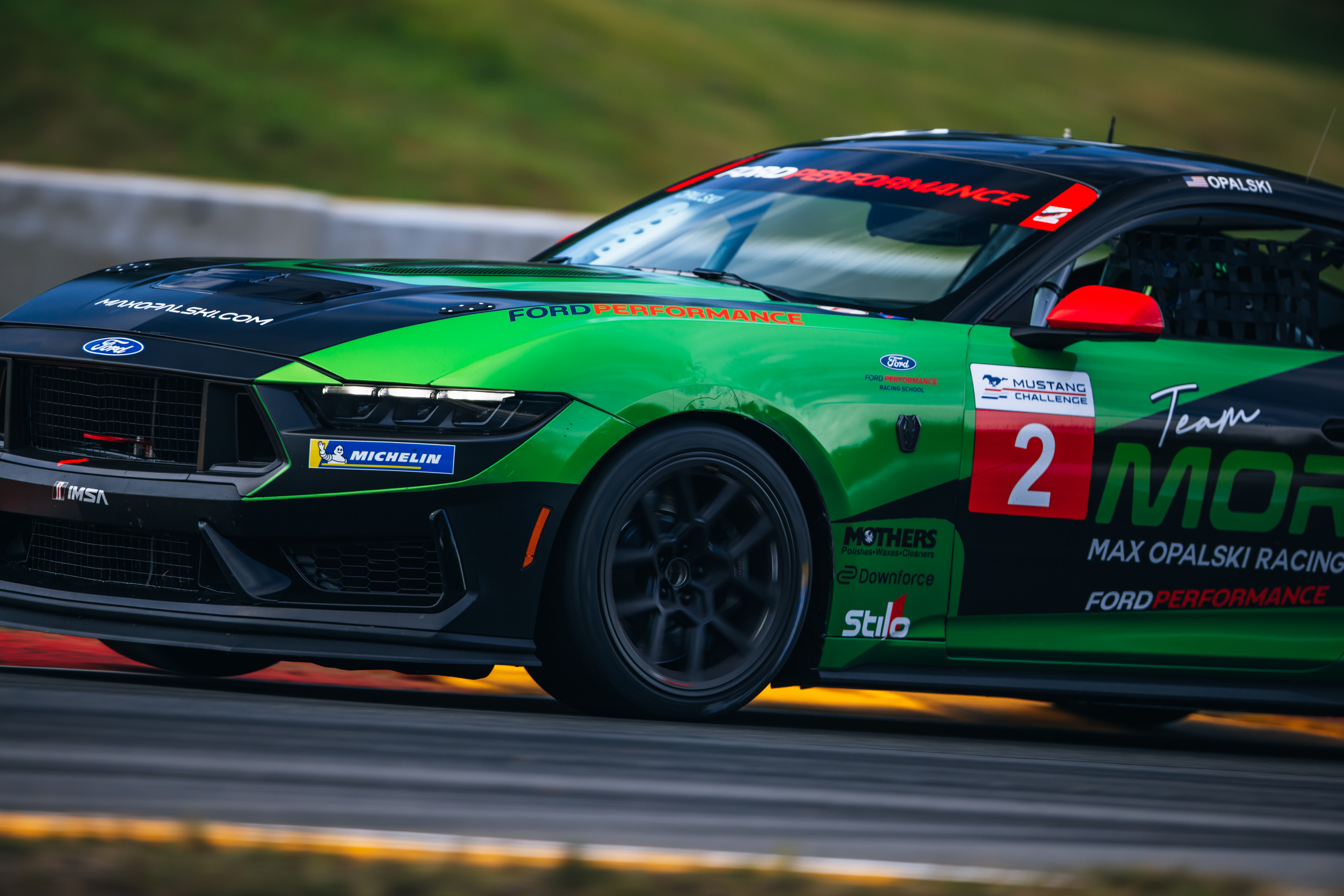
Max Opalski Driving Mustang Challenge

In 2024, at age 18, Opalski founded his own racing team, Max Opalski Racing, to compete in the newly established IMSA-sanctioned Mustang Challenge. The team was announced to run a Ford Mustang Dark Horse R, with Opalski entered as its first confirmed driver. He was reported as one of the youngest team owners in the IMSA paddock at that time.

During the 2024 Mustang Challenge season, Opalski drove the No. 2 Mustang and earned competitive results, including a sixth-place at season opener, a top-five finish at Watkins Glen and sixth-place results at Road America under his independent entry. He later joined McCumbee McAleer Racing for the remainder of the season, competing alongside a larger team structure. In the final race of the season, Opalski finished Race 1 and 2 in fourth.

== 2026 ==
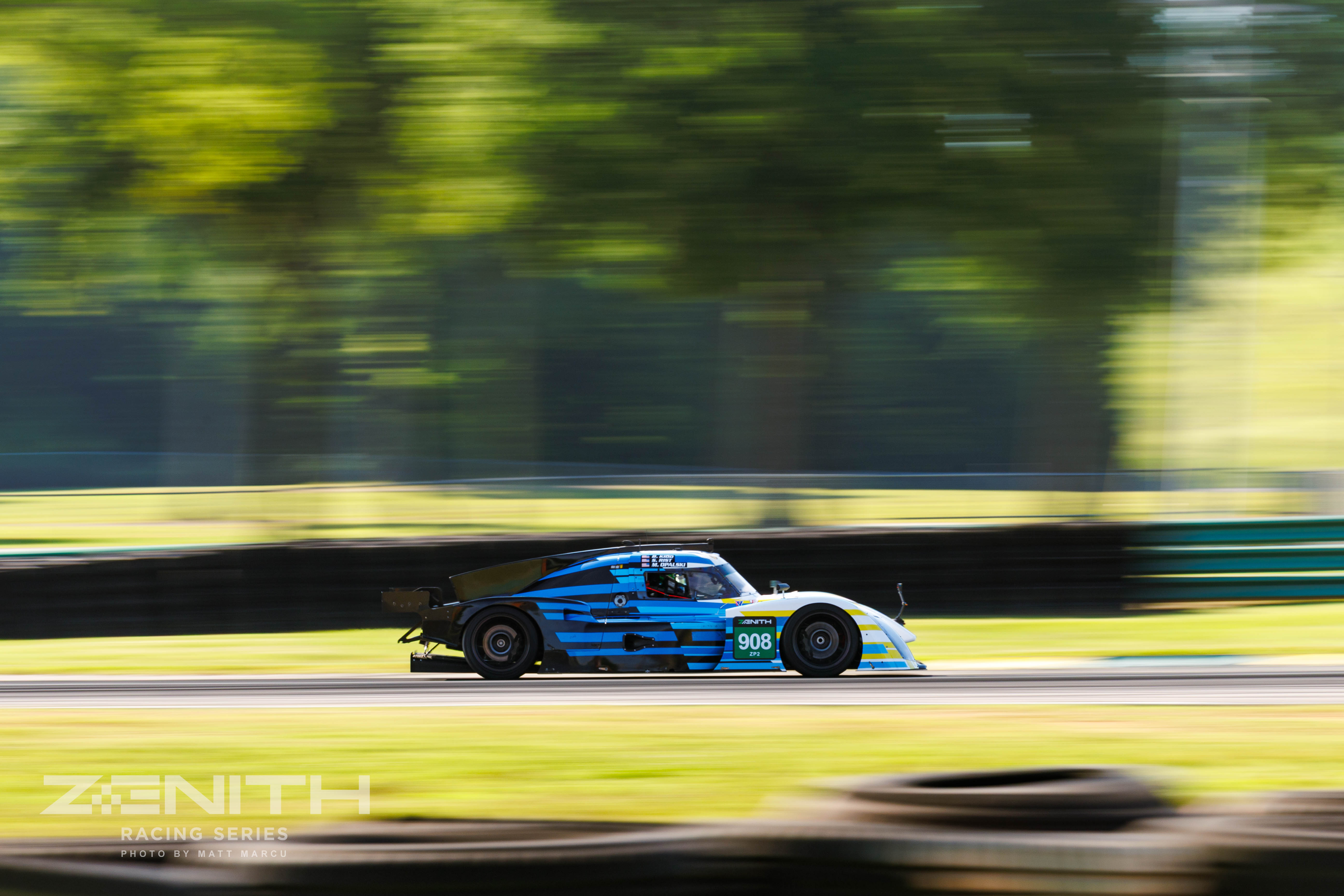
Max Opalski VIR NP01

In 2026, Opalski competed in the Zenith Racing Series with Automatic Racing, driving the NP01 Prototype. The season included appearances at several road courses in the United States, including Barber Motorsports Park. Other Tracks on the schedule included Sonoma Raceway, Virginia International Raceway, Road America, Watkins Glen International, and Daytona International. The campaign marked Opalski’s participation in prototype sports car competition as part of the Automatic Racing program during the 2026 racing season. Races consist of 7 and 12 hour endurance races. In 2024, Max Opalski expanded his experience beyond road-course sports car racing by competing in Legends car racing at New River All American Speedway in North Carolina. On June 1, 2024, he won the second Legends feature race of the evening, earning his first victory on an oval track in only his second Legends car appearance. This experience provided an introduction to oval-track competition alongside his sports car racing career. In 2026, Opalski began exploring late model stock car racing. In an Instagram post published on August 21, he thanked Jason Smith Racing for helping him adjust to a late model stock car and expressed interest in competing in the category further. This marked a further expansion of his experience from Legends cars into late model stock car racing.

== Career summary ==
Season	Series	Team	Position
2019	SKUSA Pro Tour	RPM	15th
2019	Run Your Rust off	N/A	1st
2019	Skusa Pro Tour	RPM	5th
2019	Skusa Pro Tour	RPM	8th
2019	Colorado Karting Tour	N/A	3rd
2019	Pro Kart USA	RPM	14th
2019	Pro Kart USA	RPM	4th
2019	USPKS	RPM	DNF
2019	Rotax US Finals	RPM	4th
2019	Colorado Karting Tour	N/A	2nd
2019	LAKC	RPM	2nd
2019	Pro Kart USA	RPM	3rd
2019	SKUSA SuperNationals	RPM	5th
2020	LAKC	RPM	1st
2020	Challenge of the Americas	RPM	DNF
2020	Challenge of the Americas	RPM	1st
2020	Pro Kart USA	RPM	3rd
2020	Colorado Karting Tour	N/A	DNF
2020	Rok Championship	RPM	7th
2020	Charlotte karting Challenge	RPM	3rd
2020	USPKS	RPM	4th
2020	SKUSA Pro Tour	RPM	2nd
2020	SKUSA Pro Tour	RPM	10th
2020	SKUSA Pro Tour	RPM	14th
2020	SKUSA Pro Tour	RPM	DQ
2020	SKUSA Pro Tour	RPM	3rd
2020	SKUSA Pro Tour	RPM	DNF
2020	USPKS	RPM	2nd
2020	USPKS	RPM	1st
2020	USPKS	RPM	2nd
2020	IKF Nationals	RPM	7th
2021	Skusa Winter series	RPM	9th
2021	Skusa Winter series	RPM	5th
2021	Skusa Winter series	RPM	DNF
2021	Skusa Winter series	RPM	DNF
2021	Challenge of the Americas	RPM	12th
2021	USPKS	RPM	18th
2021	USPKS	RPM	14th
2021	SKUSA Pro Tour	RPM	7th
2021	SKUSA Pro Tour	RPM	16th
2021	SKUSA SuperNationals	RPM	7th
2022	Mazda MX-5 Cup	Copeland Motorsports	9th
2022	WRL	Copeland Motorsports	3rd
2023	Mazda MX-5 Cup	Copeland Motorsports	4th
2023	Nasa Rocky Mnt	Nemnick motorsports	2nd
2023	Nasa Rocky Mnt	Nemnick motorsports	2nd
2024	IMSA Ford Mustang Challenge	Max Opalski Racing	6th
2024	Nasa Mid-Atlantic	Team MOR	2nd
2024	New River All American Speedway	Three-sixtheenths motorsports	1st
2024	Legends Nationals	Three-sixtheenths motorsports	22nd
2024	Legends Nationals	Three-sixtheenths motorsports	DNS
2025	Nasa Mid-Atlantic	Team MOR	1st
2026	Zenith Racing Sonoma	Automatic Racing	3rd
2026	Zenith Racing Sonoma	Automatic Racing	DNF
	Zenith Racing Barber	Automatic Racing	DNF
	Zenith Racing Barber	Automatic Racing	5th
