= Tyler Gonzalez =

American and Spanish racing driver (born 2004)

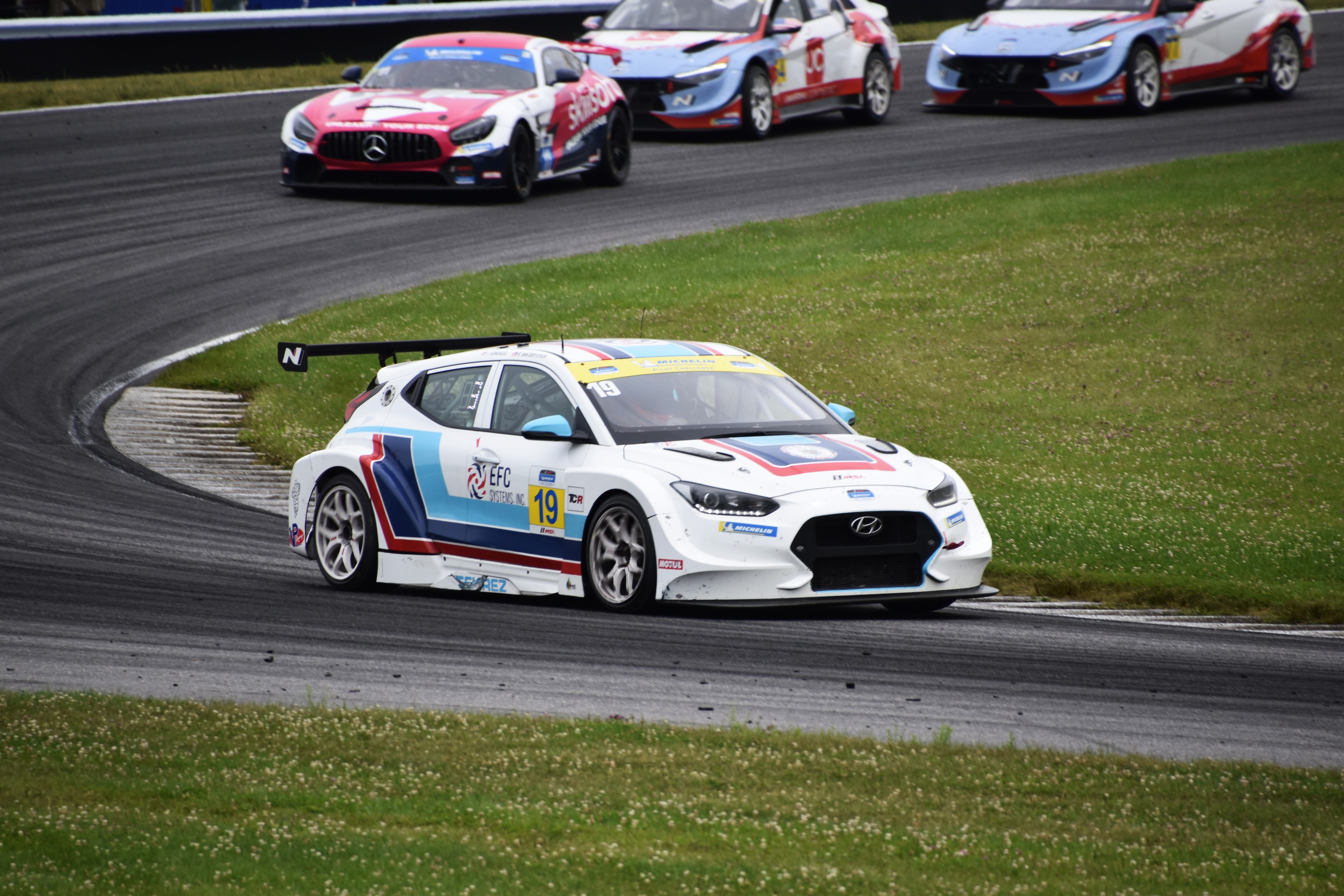
- Gonzalez in 2022
- Born: Tyler Angel Gonzalez; 19 July 2004 (age 22); St. Cloud, Florida, U.S.
- Nationality: (United States) American (Spain) Spanish
- Categorisation: FIA Silver

Championship titles
- 2023: Toyota GR Cup North America

Tyler Angel Gonzalez (born 19 July 2004) is an American and Spanish racing driver who last competed full-time for Victor Gonzalez Racing Team in the Michelin Pilot Challenge and RAFA Racing Team in GT4 America. He also raced part-time for BSI Racing in the Mazda MX-5 Cup and RGR Motorsports in the NASCAR Canada Series.

== Career ==
=== Karting and car racing debut (2012–2019) ===
Gonzalez began karting in 2012. Racing in karts until 2019, Gonzalez most notably won the Florida Winter Tour in Mini Max and the SKUSA SuperNationals in X30 Junior in 2016, before following that up with Junior Rok and Rotax Junior titles in the Florida Winter Tour the following year.

In his last year of full-time karting in 2018, Gonzalez joined Copeland Motorsports to make his car racing debut in the Mazda MX-5 Cup at the non-championship invitational round at Sebring. Following that, Gonzalez returned to the team in 2019 to compete in his first full season of car racing. Having taken a best result of fifth at Barber, Gonzalez left the series after three rounds, and joined Bryan Herta Autosport with Curb Agajanian for the final round of that year's TC America season in the TCA class.

=== Maiden season in Touring cars and MX-5 Cup return (2020–2022) ===
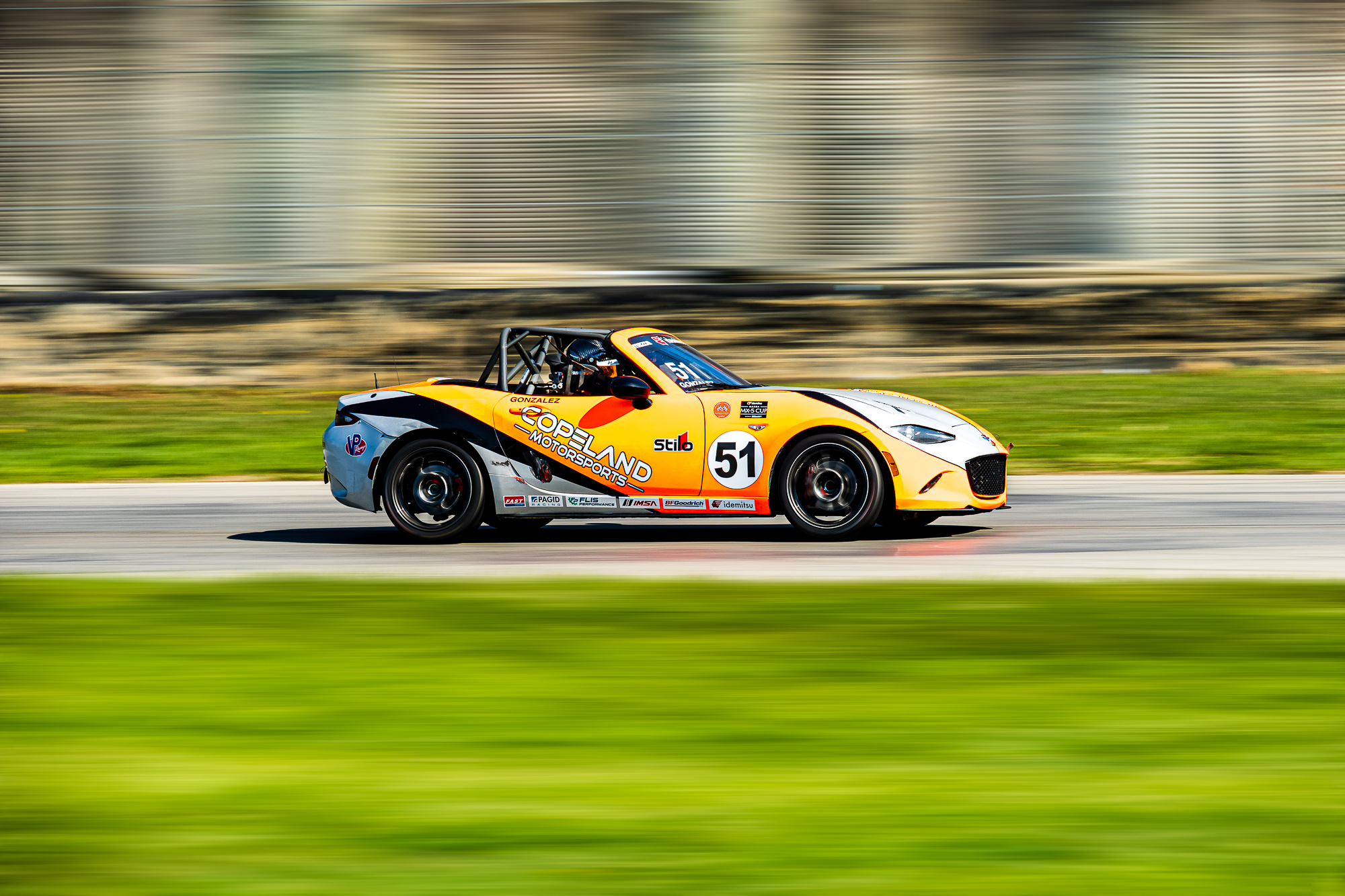
Gonzalez at the Mid-Ohio round of the 2022 Mazda MX-5 Cup season

Staying in TC America for 2020, Gonzalez remained in the TCA class but switched to Copeland Motorsports for his first full-season in the series. Having taken an early championship lead by winning four times in the first three rounds, but after scoring only three podiums in the last three rounds, Gonzalez ended the year third in points as Kevin Boehm won the title. At the end of the year, Gonzalez made his debut in the TCR class of the Michelin Pilot Challenge alongside Tyler Maxson with Copeland Motorsports. Racing at both Road Atlanta and Sebring, the duo scored their maiden series podium in the latter by finishing second.

Returning to Michelin Pilot Challenge and Copeland Motorsports for 2021, Gonzalez and Maxson scored the pole at Lime Rock Park alongside a pair of podium finishes at the former and at Road Atlanta en route to a tenth-place championship finish.

Gonzalez returned to the series the following year, switching to Van der Steur Racing for his sophomore season, with whom he scored a lone podium at Laguna Seca on his way to ninth in points in the Hyundai Veloster TCR's final full season in TCR competition. Alongside his sophomore season in Michelin Pilot Challenge, Gonzalez also returned to the Mazda MX-5 Cup, where he competed with Copeland Motorsports. Running in all but one round, Gonzalez won at Daytona, Watkins Glen, Virginia International Raceway and Road Atlanta to end the season 11th in points.

=== Toyota Development Driver and maiden title in cars (2023–) ===
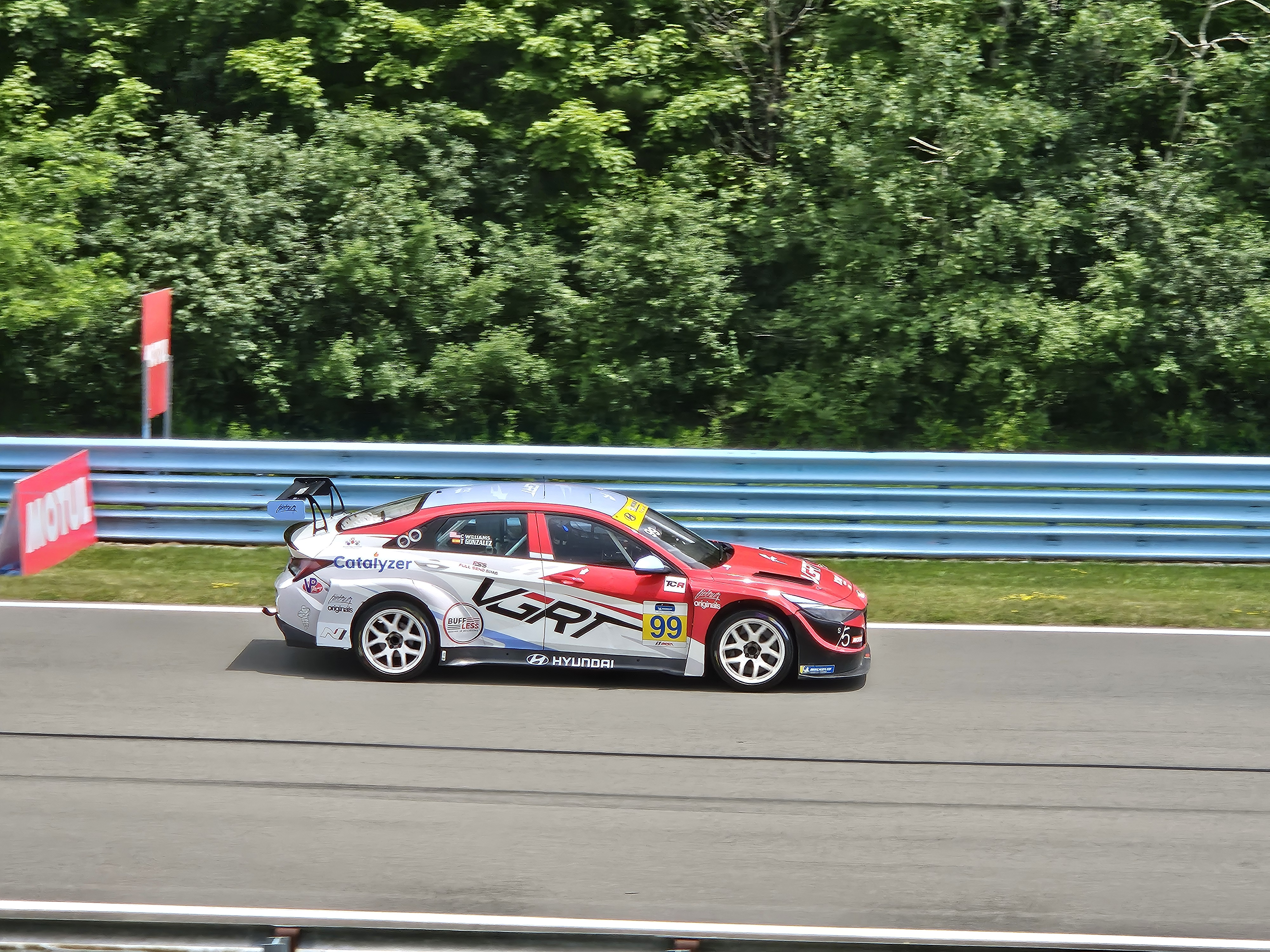
Gonzalez at the Watkins Glen round of the 2024 Michelin Pilot Challenge season

Having become a Toyota Development Driver in late 2022, Gonzalez returned to Copeland Motorsports to race in the newly-created Toyota GR Cup North America, as well as returning to the Mazda MX-5 Cup and making his GT4 America debut with them. After becoming GR Cup North America's first ever winner at Sonoma, Gonzalez took six more wins as he became the series' inaugural champion. In the other two series, Gonzalez once again won the season-opening race at Daytona in the former, whereas in GT4 America, Gonzalez took a lone podium at Circuit of the Americas.

After racing in the last three rounds of the 2023 Michelin Pilot Challenge with Victor Gonzalez Racing Team's Hyundai Elantra N TCR, Gonzalez returned to the team for the following year for his third full-time season in the series' TCR class. Racing alongside a revolving door of drivers, Gonzalez took his only podium of the season at Virginia International Raceway alongside Morgan Burkhard. During 2024, Gonzalez also raced for Saito Motorsport Group in the Mazda MX-5 Cup and Smooge Racing in the GT4 America Series. In the former, Gonzalez took a lone win at Sebring, whereas in the latter, Gonzalez won at Sonoma and Indianapolis as he ended the year fourth in the Silver Cup points.

Gonzalez returned to Victor Gonzalez Racing Team for 2025, whilst also joining RAFA Racing Team and BSI Racing to compete in both GT4 America and Mazda MX-5 Cup. In the former, Gonzalez scored two podiums in the first six races of the season, before the team switched to the Cupra León VZ TCR ahead of Road America. With the new car, Gonzalez won at Indianapolis and Road Atlanta to jump to fifth in the TCR standings at season's end. In GT4 America, Gonzalez scored wins at Circuit of the Americas, Barber and Indianapolis as well as four more podiums to end the season runner-up in the Silver class. In MX-5 Cup, Gonzalez kicked off the year by winning at Daytona and St. Petersburg, before winning both races at Barber and race one at Mosport as well as scoring a second-place finish at VIR to end the season runner-up in points.

The following year, Gonzalez continued with Victor Gonzalez Racing Team for another season in the Michelin Pilot Challenge, as well as remaining with BSI Racing and RAFA Racing Team to continue racing in the Mazda MX-5 Cup and GT4 America Series. In MPC, Gonzalez won at Sebring at the start of the season, before taking further wins at VIR and Indianapolis to once again take fifth in TCR points. In GT4 America, Gonzalez began the season with a double win at Sonoma, before winning at Barber and both raced at Indianapolis to miss out on the Silver class title by one point. During 2026, Gonzalez also made a one-off appearance in the NASCAR O'Reilly Auto Parts Series for Hettinger Racing at Circuit of the Americas, in which he failed to qualify. Gonzalez also made his NASCAR Canada Series debut at Canadian Tire Motorsport Park, driving the No. 38 Ford for RGR Motorsports, as he joined the team for a part-time schedule. In parallel, Gonzalez also raced for most of the Lamborghini Super Trofeo North America season with RAFA, taking four podiums and finishing ninth in the Pro standings.

== Karting record ==
=== Karting career summary ===
| Season | Series | Team | Position |
|---|---|---|---|
| 2012 | Florida Winter Tour — Micro Max | | 42nd |
| 2012 | Florida Winter Tour — Vortex TaG Cadet | | 41st |
| 2013 | Florida Winter Tour — Micro Max | | 6th |
| 2013 | RMC Grand Finals — Micro Max | | 7th |
| 2013 | SKUSA SuperNationals — TaG Cadet | | NC |
| 2014 | Florida Winter Tour — Mini Max | | 13th |
| 2014 | Florida Winter Tour — TaG Cadet | AM Racing Team | 8th |
| 2015 | Florida Winter Tour — Mini Max | | 5th |
| 2015 | Florida Pro Kart Winter Series – Vortex | | NC |
| 2016 | Florida Winter Tour — Mini Max | | 1st |
| 2016 | Florida Winter Tour — Junior Rok | | 8th |
| 2016 | SKUSA SuperNationals — X30 Junior | | 1st |
| 2017 | Florida Winter Tour — Junior Rok | | 1st |
| 2017 | Florida Winter Tour — Rotax Junior | | 1st |
| 2017 | Orlando Cup — Junior Rok | | 2nd |
| 2017 | Karting World Championship — OKJ | Paul Carr Racing | 17th |
| 2017 | RMC Grand Finals — Junior Max | SRA Karting Int | 25th |
| 2017 | SKUSA SuperNationals — X30 Junior | Speed Concepts Racing | 15th |
| 2018 | Orlando Cup — Junior Rok | | 1st |
| 2018 | Florida Winter Tour — Junior Rok | | 4th |
| 2018 | SKUSA Pro Tour — X30 Junior | | 4th |
| 2018 | Rok the Rio — Junior Rok | Team Benik | 7th |
| 2018 | SKUSA SuperNationals — X30 Junior | Team Benik | 38th |
| 2018 | Karting World Championship — OKJ | CRG | NC |
| 2019 | Biloxi ROK Fest — Shifter Rok | Zanella Racing | 17th |
| 2019 | Orlando Cup — Shifter Rok Senior | | 4th |

== Racing record ==
=== Racing career summary ===
| Season | Series | Team | Races | Wins | Poles | F/Laps | Podiums | Points | Position |
|---|---|---|---|---|---|---|---|---|---|
| 2019 | Mazda MX-5 Cup | Copeland Motorsports | 6 | 0 | 0 | 0 | 0 | 50 | 17th |
| 2019 | TC America Series – TCA | Bryan Herta Autosport with Curb Agajanian | 2 | 0 | 0 | 0 | 0 | 0 | NC |
| 2019 | SCCA Majors Championship Nationwide – Spec Miata | | 4 | 0 | 0 | 0 | 0 | 37 | 33rd |
| 2020 | TC America Series – TCA | Copeland Motorsports | 16 | 5 | 0 | 1 | 11 | 211 | **3rd** |
| 2020 | Michelin Pilot Challenge – TCR | Copeland Motorsports | 2 | 0 | 0 | 0 | 1 | 53 | 17th |
| 2021 | Michelin Pilot Challenge – TCR | Copeland Motorsports | 10 | 0 | 1 | 1 | 2 | 2280 | 10th |
| 2022 | Mazda MX-5 Cup | Copeland Motorsports | 12 | 4 | 0 | 1 | 5 | 2390 | 11th |
| 2022 | Michelin Pilot Challenge – TCR | Van der Steur Racing | 10 | 0 | 1 | 1 | 1 | 2320 | 9th |
| 2023 | Mazda MX-5 Cup | Copeland Motorsports | 6 | 1 | 0 | 1 | 3 | 1580 | 19th |
| 2023 | Toyota GR Cup North America | TGR Copeland Motorsports | 13 | 7 | 5 | 6 | 12 | 259 | **1st** |
| 2023 | GT4 America Series – Silver | TGR Copeland Motorsports | 7 | 0 | 1 | 0 | 1 | 63 | 9th |
| 2023 | Michelin Pilot Challenge – TCR | Victor Gonzalez Racing Team | 3 | 0 | 0 | 0 | 0 | 780 | 26th |
| 2023 | Trans-Am Series – TA2 | Nitro Motorsports | 1 | 0 | 0 | 0 | 0 | 22 | 63rd |
| 2024 | Mazda MX-5 Cup | Saito Motorsport Group | 12 | 1 | 0 | 0 | 2 | 1990 | 16th |
| 2024 | Michelin Pilot Challenge – TCR | Victor Gonzalez Racing Team | 10 | 0 | 0 | 1 | 1 | 2440 | 8th |
| 2024 | GT4 America Series – Silver | TGR Smooge Racing | 13 | 2 | 2 | 1 | 5 | 184 | 4th |
| 2024 | Trans-Am Series – TA2 | Nitro Motorsports | 4 | 0 | 0 | 0 | 3 | 345 | 14th |
| 2025 | Mazda MX-5 Cup | BSI Racing | 14 | 5 | 0 | 1 | 6 | 3290 | **2nd** |
| 2025 | Michelin Pilot Challenge – TCR | Victor Gonzalez Racing Team | 10 | 2 | 1 | 2 | 4 | 2540 | 5th |
| 2025 | GT4 America Series – Silver | RAFA Racing Team | 13 | 3 | 0 | 0 | 7 | 225 | **2nd** |
| 2025 | Lamborghini Super Trofeo North America – Pro-Am | RAFA Racing Team | 2 | 1 | 0 | 0 | 1 | 19 | 13th |
| 2025 | Trans-Am Series – TA2 | Nitro Motorsports | 3 | 0 | 0 | 1 | 2 | 257 | 18th |
| 2026 | Mazda MX-5 Cup | BSI Racing | 2 | 0 | 0 | 0 | 1 | 340 | 41st |
| 2026 | Michelin Pilot Challenge – TCR | Victor Gonzalez Racing Team | 10 | 3 | 0 | 5 | 3 | 2460 | 5th |
| 2026 | NASCAR O'Reilly Auto Parts Series | Hettinger Racing | 0 | 0 | 0 | 0 | 0 | 0 | NC |
| 2026 | GT4 America Series – Silver | RAFA Racing Team | 13 | 5 | 0 | 4 | 11 | 258 | **2nd** |
| 2026 | NASCAR Canada Series | RGR Motorsports | 3 | 0 | 0 | 0 | 0 | 43 | 48th |
| 2026 | Lamborghini Super Trofeo North America – Pro | RAFA Racing Team | 8 | 0 | 0 | 0 | 4 | 64 | 9th |

=== Complete Mazda MX-5 Cup results ===
(key) (Races in bold indicate pole position. Races in italics indicate fastest race lap in class. Results are overall/class)

| Year | Team | 1 | 2 | 3 | 4 | 5 | 6 | 7 | 8 | 9 | 10 | 11 | 12 | 13 | 14 | Rank | Points |
|---|---|---|---|---|---|---|---|---|---|---|---|---|---|---|---|---|---|
| 2019 | Copeland Motorsports | COA; 1; 10 | COA; 2; 9 | BAR; 1; 28 | BAR; 2; 5 | ELK; 1; 30 | ELK; 2; 28 | MOH; 1 | MOH; 2 | POR; 1 | POR; 2 | LGA; 1 | LGA; 2 | | | 17th | 50 |
| 2022 | Copeland Motorsports | DAY; 1; 1 | DAY; 2; 20 | STP; 1; 28 | STP; 2; 10 | MOH; 1; 26 | MOH; 2; 7 | WGL; 1; 1 | WGL; 2; 28 | ELK; 1 | ELK; 2 | VIR; 1; 1 | VIR; 2; 24 | ATL; 1; 3 | ATL; 2; 1 | 11th | 2390 |
| 2023 | Copeland Motorsports | DAY; 1; 1 | DAY; 2; 2 | STP; 1; 7 | STP; 2; 25 | LGA; 1 | LGA; 2 | WGL; 1 | WGL; 2 | ELK; 1 | ELK; 2 | VIR; 1 | VIR; 2 | ATL; 1; 2 | ATL; 2; 4 | 19th | 1580 |
| 2024 | Saito Motorsport Group | DAY; 1; 2 | DAY; 2; 8 | SEB; 1; 1 | SEB; 2; 26 | LAG; 1; 16 | LAG; 2; 14 | MOH; 1; 27 | MOH; 2; 10 | MOS; 1 | MOS; 2 | VIR; 1; 23 | VIR; 2 DNS | ATL; 1; 18 | ATL; 2; 6 | 16th | 1990 |
| 2025 | BSI Racing | DAY; 1; 1 | DAY; 2; 34 | STP; 1; 16 | STP; 2; 1 | BAR; 1; 1 | BAR; 2; 1 | MOH; 1; 7 | MOH; 2; 31 | MOS; 1; 1 | MOS; 2; 10 | VIR; 1; 2 | VIR; 2; 6 | ATL; 1; 26 | ATL; 2; 11 | 2nd | 3290 |
| 2026 | BSI Racing | DAY; 1; 36 | DAY; 2; 2 | STP; 1 | STP; 2 | MOH; 1 | MOH; 2 | MOS; 1 | MOS; 2 | VIR; 1 | VIR; 2 | IND; 1 | IND; 2 | ATL; 1 | ATL; 2 | 41st | 340 |

* Season still in progress

=== Complete TC America Series results ===
(key) (Races in bold indicate pole position) (Races in italics indicate fastest lap)

| Year | Team | Car | Class | 1 | 2 | 3 | 4 | 5 | 6 | 7 | 8 | 9 | 10 | 11 | 12 | 13 | 14 | 15 | 16 | Pos | Points |
|---|---|---|---|---|---|---|---|---|---|---|---|---|---|---|---|---|---|---|---|---|---|
| 2019 | Bryan Herta Autosport with Curb Agajanian | Hyundai Veloster Turbo R-Spec | TCA | AUS; 1 | AUS; 2 | STP; 1 | STP; 2 | VIR; 1 | VIR; 2 | SON; 1 | SON; 2 | POR; 1 | POR; 2 | WGL; 1 | WGL; 2 | ROA; 1 | ROA; 2 | LVG; 1; 14 | LVG; 2; 12 | NC | 0 |
| 2020 | Copeland Motorsports | Hyundai Veloster Turbo | TCA | AUS1; 1; 20 | AUS1; 2; 27 | VIR; 1; 21 | VIR; 2; 21 | VIR; 3; 17 | SON; 1; 15 | SON; 2; 16 | SON; 3; 5 | ROA; 1 Ret | ROA; 2 Ret | ROA; 3 DSQ | AUS2; 1; 20 | AUS2; 2; 22 | AUS2; 3; 9 | IMS; 1; 4 | IMS; 2; 8 | 3rd | 211 |

=== Complete Michelin Pilot Challenge results ===
(key) (Races in bold indicate pole position) (Races in italics indicate fastest lap)

| Year | Entrant | Class | Make | 1 | 2 | 3 | 4 | 5 | 6 | 7 | 8 | 9 | 10 | Rank | Points |
|---|---|---|---|---|---|---|---|---|---|---|---|---|---|---|---|
| 2020 | Copeland Motorsports | Touring Car | Hyundai Veloster N TCR | DAY | SEB | ELK | VIR | ATL | MOH; 1 | MOH; 2 | ATL; 10 | LAG | SEB; 2 | 17th | 53 |
| 2021 | Copeland Motorsports | Touring Car | Hyundai Veloster N TCR | DAY; 15 | SEB; 13 | MOH; 4 | WGI; 1; 14 | WGI; 2; 14 | **LIM**; 3 | ELK; 7 | LAG; 11 | VIR; 4 | ATL; 3 | 10th | 2280 |
| 2022 | Van der Steur Racing | Touring Car | Hyundai Veloster N TCR | DAY; 5 | SEB; 6 | LGA; 3 | MOH; 4 | WGL; 12 | MOS; 14 | LIM; 9 | ELK; 8 | **VIR**; 6 | ATL; 14 | 9th | 2320 |
| 2023 | Victor Gonzalez Racing Team | Touring Car | Hyundai Elantra N TCR | DAY | SEB | LGA | WGL | MOS | LIM | ELK | VIR; 4 | IMS; 7 | ATL; 5 | 26th | 780 |
| 2024 | Victor Gonzalez Racing Team | Touring Car | Hyundai Elantra N TCR | DAY; 10 | SEB; 7 | LGA; 7 | MOH; 14 | WGL; 10 | MOS; 10 | ELK; 8 | VIR; 2 | IMS; 10 | ATL; 11 | 8th | 2440 |
| 2025 | Victor Gonzalez Racing Team | Touring Car | Hyundai Elantra N TCR | DAY; 11 | SEB; 6 | LGA; 12 | MOH; 8 | WGL; 2 | MOS; 2 | | | | | 5th | 2540 |
| 2025 | Victor Gonzalez Racing Team | Touring Car | Cupra León VZ TCR | | | | | | | ELK; 14 | VIR; 15 | **IMS**; 1 | ATL; 1 | 5th | 2540 |
| 2026 | Victor Gonzalez Racing Team | Touring Car | Cupra León VZ TCR | DAY; 10 | SEB; 1 | LGA; 7 | MOH; 14 | WGL; 11 | MOS; 10 | ELK; 14 | VIR; 1 | IMS; 1 | ATL; 10 | 5th | 2460 |

=== NASCAR ===
(key) (Bold – Pole position awarded by qualifying time. Italics – Pole position earned by points standings or practice time. * – Most laps led.)

==== O'Reilly Auto Parts Series ====
NASCAR O'Reilly Auto Parts Series results
| Year | Team | No. | Make | 1 | 2 | 3 | 4 | 5 | 6 | 7 | 8 | 9 | 10 | 11 | 12 | 13 | 14 | 15 | 16 | 17 | 18 | 19 | 20 | 21 | 22 | 23 | 24 | 25 | 26 | 27 | 28 | 29 | 30 | 31 | 32 | 33 | NOAPSC | Pts | Ref |
|---|---|---|---|---|---|---|---|---|---|---|---|---|---|---|---|---|---|---|---|---|---|---|---|---|---|---|---|---|---|---|---|---|---|---|---|---|---|---|---|
| 2026 | Hettinger Racing | 5 | Ford | DAY | ATL | COA; DNQ | PHO | LVS | DAR | MAR | CAR | BRI | KAN | TAL | TEX | GLN | DOV | CLT | NSH | POC | COR | SON | CHI | ATL | IND | IOW | DAY | DAR | GTW | BRI | LVS | CLT | PHO | TAL | MAR | HOM | NC | 0^{1} | |

==== Canada Series ====
NASCAR Canada Series results
| Year | Team | No. | Make | 1 | 2 | 3 | 4 | 5 | 6 | 7 | 8 | 9 | 10 | 11 | 12 | 13 | 14 | NCSC | Pts | Ref |
|---|---|---|---|---|---|---|---|---|---|---|---|---|---|---|---|---|---|---|---|---|
| 2026 | RGR Motorsports | 38 | Ford | MSP; 30 | ACD | ACD | RIS | AMS | AMS | CMP | EIR | EIR | CTR | MAR; 23 | ICAR | MSP; 37 | DEL | 48th | 43 | |

^{*} Season still in progress
^{1} Ineligible for series points
