= 2026 Focused Health 250 (COTA) =

NASCAR O'Reilly Auto Parts Series race at Circuit of the Americas

Race details
- Race 3 of 33 in the 2026 NASCAR O'Reilly Auto Parts Series
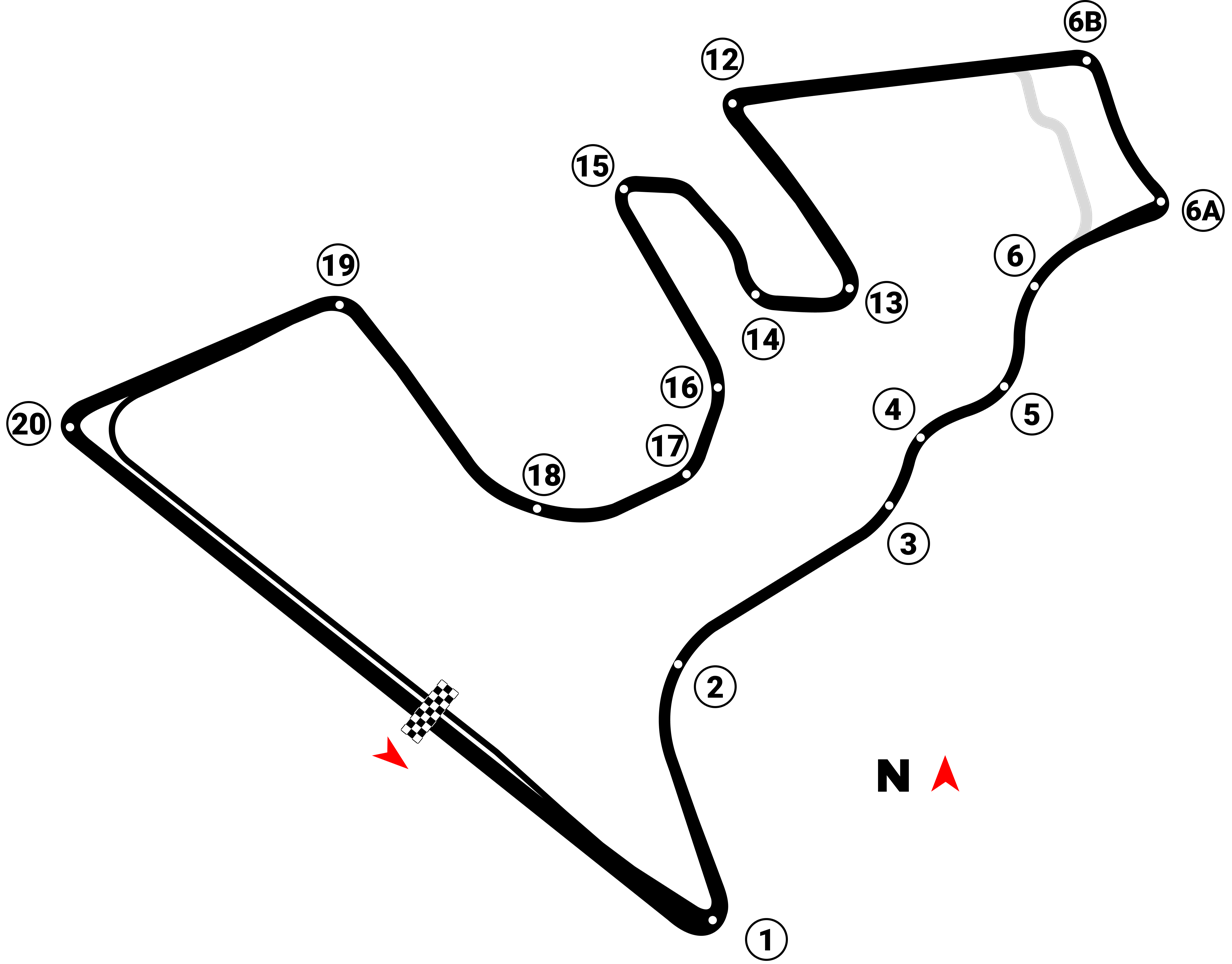
- Date: February 28, 2026
- Location: Circuit of the Americas in Austin, Texas
- Course: Permanent racing facility
- Course length: 2.400 miles (3.862 km)
- Distance: 65 laps, 156 mi (251 km)
- Average speed: 105.508 miles per hour (169.799 km/h)

Pole position
Driver	Connor Zilisch	JR Motorsports
- Time: 1:37.740

Most laps led
Driver	Shane van Gisbergen	JR Motorsports
- Laps: 31

Fastest lap
Driver	Shane van Gisbergen	JR Motorsports
- Time: 1:39.452

Winner
No. 9	Shane van Gisbergen	JR Motorsports

Television in the United States
- Network: The CW
- Announcers: Adam Alexander, Jamie McMurray, and Parker Kligerman

Radio in the United States
- Radio: PRN
- Booth announcers: Brad Gillie, Nick Yeoman, and Daniel Suárez
- Turn announcers: Andrew Kurland (Turn 1), Doug Turnbull (Turns 2–6A), Kyle Rickey (Turns 6B–15), and Pat Patterson (Turns 16–20)

The 2026 Focused Health 250 was a NASCAR O'Reilly Auto Parts Series race held on Saturday, February 28, 2026, at Circuit of the Americas in Austin, Texas. Contested over 65 laps on the 2.400-mile-long asphalt road course, it was the third race of the 2026 NASCAR O'Reilly Auto Parts Series season, and the fifth running of the event.

Shane van Gisbergen, driving for JR Motorsports, continued to show road course dominance with a blistering performance, leading a race-high 31 laps and surviving a chaotic late restart to earn his fifth career NASCAR O'Reilly Auto Parts Series win, and his first of the season. Austin Hill finished second, and Sammy Smith finished third. Jesse Love and Corey Day rounded out the top five, while Brent Crews (in his series debut), William Sawalich, Justin Allgaier, Ross Chastain, and Brennan Poole rounded out the top ten.

== Report ==
=== Background ===
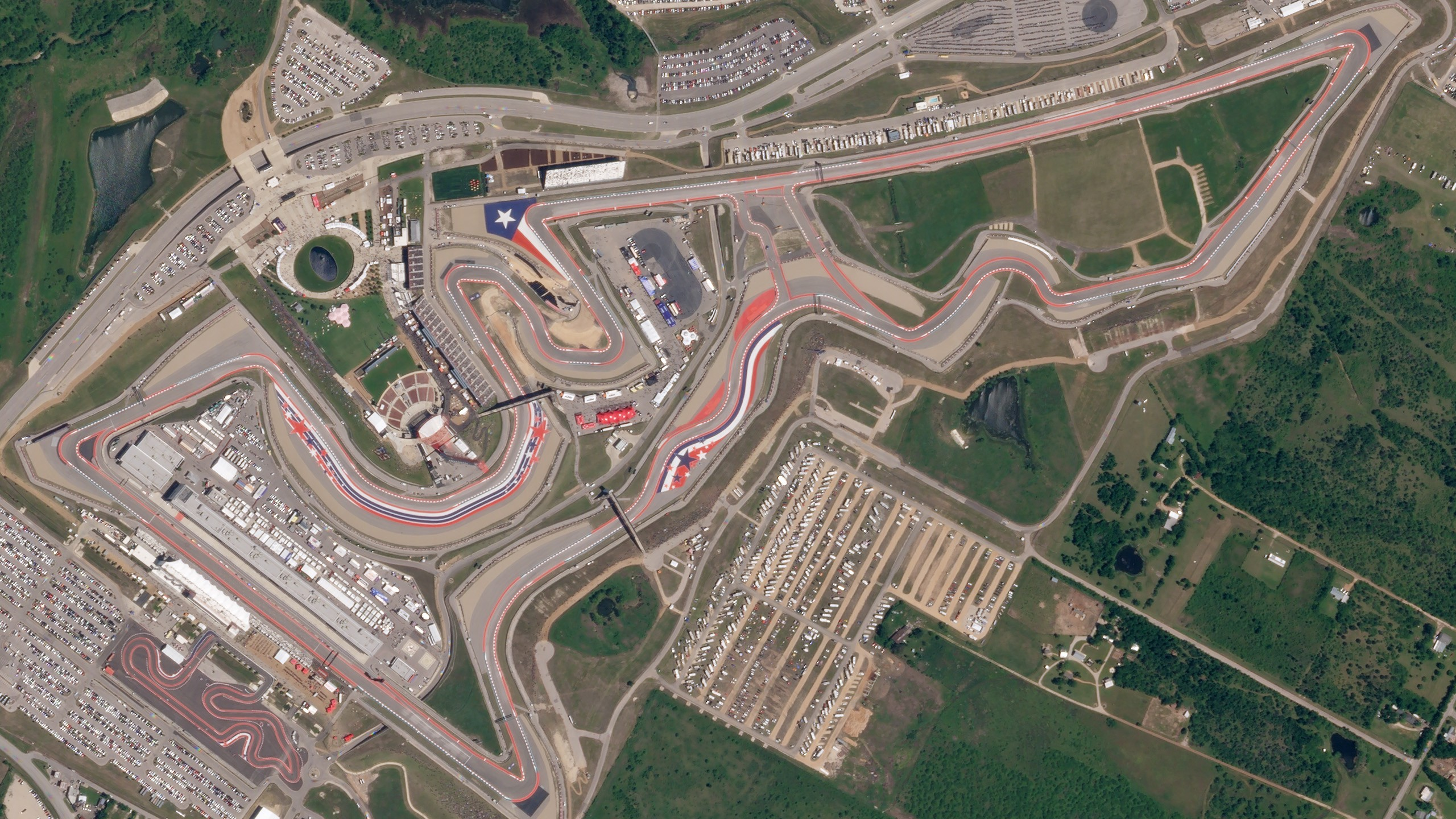
Aerial view of Circuit of the Americas, the track where the race will be held.

Circuit of the Americas (COTA) is a grade 1 FIA-specification motorsports facility located within the extraterritorial jurisdiction of Austin, Texas. It features a 3.426-mile (5.514 km) road racing circuit. The facility is home to the Formula One United States Grand Prix, and the Motorcycle Grand Prix of the Americas, a round of the FIM Road Racing World Championship. It previously hosted the Supercars Championship, the FIA World Endurance Championship, the IMSA SportsCar Championship, and IndyCar Series.

On November 20, 2024, it was announced that the race would move to the 2.400 mi (3.862 km) layout.

==== Entry list ====
- (R) denotes rookie driver.
- (i) denotes driver who is ineligible for series driver points.

#	Driver	Team	Make
00	Sheldon Creed	Haas Factory Team	Chevrolet
0	Alex Labbé	SS-Green Light Racing	Chevrolet
1	Connor Zilisch (i)	JR Motorsports	Chevrolet
02	Ryan Ellis	Young's Motorsports	Chevrolet
2	Jesse Love	Richard Childress Racing	Chevrolet
5	Tyler Gonzalez	Hettinger Racing	Ford
07	Josh Bilicki	SS-Green Light Racing	Chevrolet
7	Justin Allgaier	JR Motorsports	Chevrolet
8	Sammy Smith	JR Motorsports	Chevrolet
9	Shane van Gisbergen (i)	JR Motorsports	Chevrolet
17	Corey Day	Hendrick Motorsports	Chevrolet
18	William Sawalich	Joe Gibbs Racing	Toyota
19	Brent Crews (R)	Joe Gibbs Racing	Toyota
20	Brandon Jones	Joe Gibbs Racing	Toyota
21	Austin Hill	Richard Childress Racing	Chevrolet
24	Harrison Burton	Sam Hunt Racing	Toyota
25	Nick Sanchez	AM Racing	Ford
26	Dean Thompson	Sam Hunt Racing	Toyota
27	Jeb Burton	Jordan Anderson Racing	Chevrolet
28	Kyle Sieg	RSS Racing	Chevrolet
30	Baltazar Leguizamón	Barrett–Cope Racing	Chevrolet
31	Blaine Perkins	Jordan Anderson Racing	Chevrolet
32	Ross Chastain (i)	Jordan Anderson Racing	Chevrolet
35	Austin J. Hill	Joey Gase Motorsports	Chevrolet
39	Ryan Sieg	RSS Racing	Chevrolet
41	Sam Mayer	Haas Factory Team	Chevrolet
42	J. J. Yeley	Young's Motorsports	Chevrolet
44	Brennan Poole	Alpha Prime Racing	Chevrolet
45	Lavar Scott (R)	Alpha Prime Racing	Chevrolet
48	Patrick Staropoli (R)	Big Machine Racing	Chevrolet
50	Preston Pardus	Pardus Racing	Chevrolet
51	Jeremy Clements	Jeremy Clements Racing	Chevrolet
54	Taylor Gray	Joe Gibbs Racing	Toyota
55	Sage Karam	Joey Gase Motorsports	Toyota
87	Austin Green	Peterson Racing	Chevrolet
88	Rajah Caruth	JR Motorsports	Chevrolet
91	Carson Kvapil	DGM Racing	Chevrolet
92	Josh Williams	DGM Racing	Chevrolet
96	Anthony Alfredo	Viking Motorsports	Chevrolet
99	Parker Retzlaff	Viking Motorsports	Chevrolet
Official entry list

== Practice ==
The first and only practice session was held on Friday, February 27, at 4:00 PM CST, and lasted for 50 minutes.

Sam Mayer, driving for Haas Factory Team, set the fastest time in the session, with a lap of 1:38.706 seconds, and a speed of 87.533 miles per hour (140.871 km/h).

=== Practice results ===
Pos.	#	Driver	Team	Make	Time	Speed
1	41	Sam Mayer	Haas Factory Team	Chevrolet	1:38.706	87.533
2	00	Sheldon Creed	Haas Factory Team	Chevrolet	1:38.809	87.441
3	87	Austin Green	Peterson Racing	Chevrolet	1:38.834	87.419
Full practice results

== Qualifying ==
Qualifying was held on Friday, February 27, at 5:05 PM CST. Since Circuit of the Americas is a road course, the qualifying procedure used was a two-group system with one round. Drivers were separated into two groups, A and B. Each driver had multiple laps to set a time. Whoever set the fastest time between both groups won the pole.

Under a 2021 rule change, the timing line in road course qualifying is "not" the start-finish line. Instead, the timing line for qualifying was set at the exit of Istanbul 8. Connor Zilisch, driving for JR Motorsports, qualified on pole position with a lap of 1:37.740 seconds, and a speed of 88.398 miles per hour (142.263 km/h).

Two drivers failed to qualify: Josh Williams and Tyler Gonzalez.

=== Qualifying results ===
Pos.	#	Driver	Team	Make	Time	Speed
1	1	Connor Zilisch (i)	JR Motorsports	Chevrolet	1:37.740	88.398
2	9	Shane van Gisbergen (i)	JR Motorsports	Chevrolet	1:37.949	88.209
3	21	Austin Hill	Richard Childress Racing	Chevrolet	1:38.359	87.841
4	20	Brandon Jones	Joe Gibbs Racing	Toyota	1:38.448	87.762
5	7	Justin Allgaier	JR Motorsports	Chevrolet	1:38.562	87.661
6	91	Carson Kvapil	DGM Racing	Chevrolet	1:38.572	87.652
7	19	Brent Crews (R)	Joe Gibbs Racing	Toyota	1:38.670	87.565
8	41	Sam Mayer	Haas Factory Team	Chevrolet	1:38.717	87.523
9	00	Sheldon Creed	Haas Factory Team	Chevrolet	1:38.786	87.462
10	8	Sammy Smith	JR Motorsports	Chevrolet	1:38.863	87.394
11	2	Jesse Love	Richard Childress Racing	Chevrolet	1:38.887	87.372
12	17	Corey Day	Hendrick Motorsports	Chevrolet	1:38.900	87.361
13	87	Austin Green	Peterson Racing	Chevrolet	1:38.903	87.358
14	54	Taylor Gray	Joe Gibbs Racing	Toyota	1:39.021	87.254
15	18	William Sawalich	Joe Gibbs Racing	Toyota	1:39.393	86.928
16	96	Anthony Alfredo	Viking Motorsports	Chevrolet	1:39.429	86.896
17	50	Preston Pardus	Pardus Racing	Chevrolet	1:39.483	86.849
18	39	Ryan Sieg	RSS Racing	Chevrolet	1:39.542	86.798
19	88	Rajah Caruth	JR Motorsports	Chevrolet	1:39.544	86.796
20	25	Nick Sanchez	AM Racing	Ford	1:39.546	86.794
21	32	Ross Chastain (i)	Jordan Anderson Racing	Chevrolet	1:39.586	86.759
22	55	Sage Karam	Joey Gase Motorsports	Toyota	1:39.947	86.446
23	24	Harrison Burton	Sam Hunt Racing	Toyota	1:40.024	86.379
24	31	Blaine Perkins	Jordan Anderson Racing	Chevrolet	1:40.140	86.279
25	07	Josh Bilicki	SS-Green Light Racing	Chevrolet	1:40.145	86.275
26	44	Brennan Poole	Alpha Prime Racing	Chevrolet	1:40.190	86.236
27	26	Dean Thompson	Sam Hunt Racing	Toyota	1:40.241	86.192
28	0	Alex Labbé	SS-Green Light Racing	Chevrolet	1:40.243	86.191
29	99	Parker Retzlaff	Viking Motorsports	Chevrolet	1:40.431	86.029
30	51	Jeremy Clements	Jeremy Clements Racing	Chevrolet	1:40.462	86.003
31	45	Lavar Scott (R)	Alpha Prime Racing	Chevrolet	1:40.484	85.984
32	48	Patrick Staropoli (R)	Big Machine Racing	Chevrolet	1:40.702	85.798
Qualified by owner's points
33	02	Ryan Ellis	Young's Motorsports	Chevrolet	1:40.755	85.753
34	27	Jeb Burton	Jordan Anderson Racing	Chevrolet	1:41.010	85.536
35	28	Kyle Sieg	RSS Racing	Chevrolet	1:41.176	85.396
36	42	J. J. Yeley	Young's Motorsports	Chevrolet	1:41.821	84.855
37	30	Baltazar Leguizamón	Barrett–Cope Racing	Chevrolet	1:42.536	84.263
38	35	Austin J. Hill	Joey Gase Motorsports	Chevrolet	—	—
Failed to qualify
39	92	Josh Williams	DGM Racing	Chevrolet	1:40.787	85.725
40	5	Tyler Gonzalez	Hettinger Racing	Ford	1:42.020	84.689
Official qualifying results
Official starting lineup

== Race ==
=== Race results ===
==== Stage results ====
Stage One Laps: 20

Pos.	#	Driver	Team	Make	Pts
1	21	Austin Hill	Richard Childress Racing	Chevrolet	10
2	41	Sam Mayer	Haas Factory Team	Chevrolet	9
3	7	Justin Allgaier	JR Motorsports	Chevrolet	8
4	20	Brandon Jones	Joe Gibbs Racing	Toyota	7
5	2	Jesse Love	Richard Childress Racing	Chevrolet	6
6	91	Carson Kvapil	DGM Racing	Chevrolet	5
7	17	Corey Day	Hendrick Motorsports	Chevrolet	4
8	87	Austin Green	Peterson Racing	Chevrolet	3
9	88	Rajah Caruth (R)	JR Motorsports	Chevrolet	2
10	9	Shane van Gisbergen (i)	JR Motorsports	Chevrolet	0

Stage Two Laps: 20

Pos.	#	Driver	Team	Make	Pts
1	41	Sam Mayer	Haas Factory Team	Chevrolet	10
2	7	Justin Allgaier	JR Motorsports	Chevrolet	9
3	91	Carson Kvapil	DGM Racing	Chevrolet	8
4	2	Jesse Love	Richard Childress Racing	Chevrolet	7
5	9	Shane van Gisbergen (i)	JR Motorsports	Chevrolet	0
6	21	Austin Hill	Richard Childress Racing	Chevrolet	5
7	8	Sammy Smith	JR Motorsports	Chevrolet	4
8	20	Brandon Jones	Joe Gibbs Racing	Toyota	3
9	32	Ross Chastain (i)	Jordan Anderson Racing	Chevrolet	0
10	39	Ryan Sieg	RSS Racing	Chevrolet	1

=== Final Stage results ===
Stage Three Laps: 25

Fin	St	#	Driver	Team	Make	Laps	Led	Status	Pts
1	2	9	Shane van Gisbergen (i)	JR Motorsports	Chevrolet	65	31	Running	0
2	3	21	Austin Hill	Richard Childress Racing	Chevrolet	65	4	Running	50
3	10	8	Sammy Smith	JR Motorsports	Chevrolet	65	0	Running	38
4	11	2	Jesse Love	Richard Childress Racing	Chevrolet	65	0	Running	46
5	12	17	Corey Day	Hendrick Motorsports	Chevrolet	65	0	Running	36
6	7	19	Brent Crews (R)	Joe Gibbs Racing	Toyota	65	5	Running	31
7	15	18	William Sawalich	Joe Gibbs Racing	Toyota	65	0	Running	30
8	5	7	Justin Allgaier	JR Motorsports	Chevrolet	65	1	Running	46
9	21	32	Ross Chastain (i)	Jordan Anderson Racing	Chevrolet	65	0	Running	0
10	26	44	Brennan Poole	Alpha Prime Racing	Chevrolet	65	0	Running	27
11	9	00	Sheldon Creed	Haas Factory Team	Chevrolet	65	0	Running	26
12	14	54	Taylor Gray	Joe Gibbs Racing	Toyota	65	0	Running	25
13	28	0	Alex Labbé	SS-Green Light Racing	Chevrolet	65	0	Running	24
14	8	41	Sam Mayer	Haas Factory Team	Chevrolet	65	8	Running	42
15	4	20	Brandon Jones	Joe Gibbs Racing	Toyota	65	0	Running	32
16	18	39	Ryan Sieg	RSS Racing	Chevrolet	65	0	Running	22
17	24	31	Blaine Perkins	Jordan Anderson Racing	Chevrolet	65	0	Running	20
18	34	27	Jeb Burton	Jordan Anderson Racing	Chevrolet	65	0	Running	19
19	6	91	Carson Kvapil	DGM Racing	Chevrolet	65	2	Running	31
20	32	48	Patrick Staropoli (R)	Big Machine Racing	Chevrolet	65	0	Running	17
21	1	1	Connor Zilisch (i)	JR Motorsports	Chevrolet	65	13	Running	0
22	31	45	Lavar Scott (R)	Alpha Prime Racing	Chevrolet	65	0	Running	15
23	16	96	Anthony Alfredo	Viking Motorsports	Chevrolet	65	0	Running	14
24	35	28	Kyle Sieg	RSS Racing	Chevrolet	65	0	Running	13
25	20	25	Nick Sanchez	AM Racing	Ford	65	1	Running	12
26	27	26	Dean Thompson	Sam Hunt Racing	Toyota	65	0	Running	11
27	17	50	Preston Pardus	Pardus Racing	Chevrolet	65	0	Running	10
28	36	42	J. J. Yeley (Note: J. J. Yeley suffered an illness during the race and was relieved by Brad Perez after the second stage. Since Yeley started the race, he is officially credited with a 28th place finish.)	Young's Motorsports	Chevrolet	65	0	Running	9
29	23	24	Harrison Burton	Sam Hunt Racing	Toyota	65	0	Running	8
30	29	99	Parker Retzlaff	Viking Motorsports	Chevrolet	65	0	Running	7
31	19	88	Rajah Caruth	JR Motorsports	Chevrolet	65	0	Running	8
32	30	51	Jeremy Clements	Jeremy Clements Racing	Chevrolet	65	0	Running	5
33	13	87	Austin Green	Peterson Racing	Chevrolet	65	0	Running	7
34	33	02	Ryan Ellis	Young's Motorsports	Chevrolet	64	0	Running	3
35	22	55	Sage Karam	Joey Gase Motorsports	Toyota	53	0	Suspension	2
36	25	07	Josh Bilicki	SS-Green Light Racing	Chevrolet	35	0	Suspension	1
37	37	30	Baltazar Leguizamón	Barrett–Cope Racing	Chevrolet	33	0	Accident	1
38	38	35	Austin J. Hill	Joey Gase Motorsports	Chevrolet	7	0	Suspension	1
Official race results

=== Race statistics ===
- Lead changes: 16 among 8 different drivers
- Cautions/Laps: 4 for 12 laps
- Red flags: 0
- Time of race: 2 hours, 12 minutes and 56 seconds
- Average speed: 70.411 miles per hour (113.316 km/h)

== Standings after the race ==
Drivers' Championship standings

	Pos	Driver	Points
	1	Austin Hill	154
2	2	Jesse Love	126 (–28)
3	3	Justin Allgaier	115 (–39)
1	4	Sheldon Creed	106 (–48)
2	5	Carson Kvapil	95 (–59)
4	6	Rajah Caruth	90 (–64)
2	7	Sammy Smith	86 (–68)
	8	Corey Day	86 (–68)
4	9	Parker Retzlaff	81 (–73)
9	10	Sam Mayer	78 (–76)
5	11	Brandon Jones	73 (–81)
	12	Brennan Poole	70 (–84)
Official driver's standings

Manufacturers' Championship standings

	Pos	Manufacturer	Points
	1	Chevrolet	165
1	2	Toyota	70 (–95)
1	3	Ford	62 (–103)

- Note: Only the first 12 positions are included for the driver standings.

Previous race: 2026 Bennett Transportation & Logistics 250	NASCAR O'Reilly Auto Parts Series; 2026 season	Next race: 2026 GOVX 200
