= 2022 Mazda MX-5 Cup =

Motor racing competition

The 2022 Idemitsu Mazda MX-5 Cup presented by BF Goodrich was a single-make motor racing championship, the 18th season of the Mazda MX-5 Cup and the 2nd under a new sanctioning agreement with the International Motor Sports Association (IMSA). The series began on January 27 at Daytona International Speedway, and concluded on October 1 at Michelin Raceway Road Atlanta after 14 rounds. Jared Thomas won the driver's championship by a narrow margin of 10 points over Connor Zilisch, who was awarded Rookie of the Year. Hixon Motor Sports earned the entrant's championship.

== Schedule ==
The schedule was announced on August 6, 2021, featuring 14 rounds across seven double-header weekends. All races are 45 minutes in length.

Rnd.	Circuit	Location	Dates	Supporting
1	Daytona International Speedway (Road Course)	(United States) Daytona Beach, Florida	January 27–30	IMSA WeatherTech SportsCar Championship
2	Daytona International Speedway (Road Course)	(United States) Daytona Beach, Florida	January 27–30	IMSA WeatherTech SportsCar Championship
3	Streets of St. Petersburg	(United States) St. Petersburg, Florida	February 25–27	NTT Data IndyCar Series
4	Streets of St. Petersburg	(United States) St. Petersburg, Florida	February 25–27	NTT Data IndyCar Series
5	Mid-Ohio Sports Car Course	(United States) Lexington, Ohio	May 13–15	IMSA WeatherTech SportsCar Championship
6	Mid-Ohio Sports Car Course	(United States) Lexington, Ohio	May 13–15	IMSA WeatherTech SportsCar Championship
7	Watkins Glen International	(United States) Watkins Glen, New York	June 23–26	IMSA WeatherTech SportsCar Championship
8	Watkins Glen International	(United States) Watkins Glen, New York	June 23–26	IMSA WeatherTech SportsCar Championship
9	Road America	(United States) Elkhart Lake, Wisconsin	July 1–3	NASCAR Cup Series
10	Road America	(United States) Elkhart Lake, Wisconsin	July 1–3	NASCAR Cup Series
11	Virginia International Raceway	(United States) Alton, Virginia	August 26–28	IMSA WeatherTech SportsCar Championship
12	Virginia International Raceway	(United States) Alton, Virginia	August 26–28	IMSA WeatherTech SportsCar Championship
13	Michelin Raceway Road Atlanta	(United States) Braselton, Georgia	September 28–October 1	IMSA WeatherTech SportsCar Championship
14	Michelin Raceway Road Atlanta	(United States) Braselton, Georgia	September 28–October 1	IMSA WeatherTech SportsCar Championship

== Entry list ==
All competitors utilize the Mazda MX-5 Cup car, modified to their homologated racing specification by Flis Performance.

Team	No.	Driver		Rounds
(United States) Carter Racing Enterprises	08	(United States) Michael Carter		1–5
(United States) Copeland Motorsports	2	(United States) Maximilian Opalski	R	1–4, 6–7
(United States) Copeland Motorsports	7	(United States) Matt Curry	R	1, 3
(United States) Copeland Motorsports	31	(United States) Jameson Riley	R	All
(United States) Copeland Motorsports	51	(United States) Tyler Gonzalez		1–4, 6–7
(United States) Copeland Motorsports	51	(United States) Maximilian Opalski	R	5
(United States) Spark Performance	5	(United States) Gresham Wagner		All
(United States) Spark Performance	24	(United States) Aaron Jeansonne		All
(United States) Spark Performance	33	(United States) Alex Bachoura		All
(United States) Spark Performance	48	(United States) Rossi Lee		2–3, 6
(United States) Hixon Motor Sports	10	(United States) Thomas Annunziata	R	6
(United States) Hixon Motor Sports	21	(United States) Bruno Carneiro	R	1–6
(United States) Hixon Motor Sports	27	(United States) Dante Tornello	R	1–5
(United States) Hixon Motor Sports	65	(United States) Bryce Cornet	R	1–6
(United States) Hixon Motor Sports	72	(United States) Connor Zilisch	R	All
(United States) Hixon Motor Sports	80	(United States) Ethan Tyler	R	3–6
(United States) Hixon Motor Sports	85	(Brazil) Bruno Smielevski	R	6–7
(United States) Hixon Motor Sports	87	(United States) Selin Rollan		All
(United States) McCumbee McAleer Racing	13	(United States) Jenson Altzman		All
(United States) McCumbee McAleer Racing	15	(United States) Aidan Fassnacht	R	All
(United States) McCumbee McAleer Racing	28	(United States) Sam Paley		All
(United States) McCumbee McAleer Racing	39	(United States) John Jodoin	R	All
(United States) McCumbee McAleer Racing	48	(United States) Rossi Lee		1
(United States) McCumbee McAleer Racing	53	(United States) Mark Kvamme		7
(United States) McCumbee McAleer Racing	55	(Russia) Moisey Uretsky		1–5
(United States) McCumbee McAleer Racing	76	(United States) Matthew Dirks		All
(United States) McCumbee McAleer Racing	89	(United States) Justin Piscitell		All
(United States) Thunder Bunny Racing	22	(United States) Laura Hayes	R	All
(United States) Thunder Bunny Racing	75	(United States) Parker Kligerman	R	5
(United States) JTR Motorsports Engineering	23	(United States) Glenn McGee		All
(United States) JTR Motorsports Engineering	69	(United States) Anthony McIntosh	R	1–5, 7
(United States) JTR Motorsports Engineering	81	(United States) James Hayosh	R	4–5
(United States) JTR Motorsports Engineering	82	(United States) Woody Heimann		All
(United States) JTR Motorsports Engineering	88	(United States) Sean Varwig	R	1–2
(United States) JTR Motorsports Engineering	88	(United States) Cameron Lawrence		7
(United States) JTR Motorsports Engineering	96	(United States) Jared Thomas		All
(United States) Formidable Racing	32	(United States) Chris Nunes		1–6
(United States) Formidable Racing	43	(United States) Joey Atanasio	R	All
(United States) Formidable Racing	44	(United States) Mickey Thomas	R	2
(United States) Slipstream Performance	36	(United States) David Staab		All
(United States) Slipstream Performance	37	(United States) Michael Staab	R	1–3, 5–7

R = Eligible for Rookie's Championship

== Race Results ==
Bold indicates overall winner.

Round		Circuit	Pole position	Fastest lap	Winning driver
1	R1	Daytona	(United States) #28 McCumbee McAleer Racing	(United States) #96 JTR Motorsports Engineering	(United States) #51 Copeland Motorsports
1	R1	Daytona	(United States) Sam Paley	(United States) Jared Thomas	(United States) Tyler Gonzalez
1	R2	Daytona	(United States) #72 Hixon Motor Sports	(United States) #5 Spark Performance	(United States) #96 JTR Motorsports Engineering
1	R2	Daytona	(United States) Connor Zilisch	(United States) Gresham Wagner	(United States) Jared Thomas
2	R1	St. Petersburg	(United States) #23 JTR Motorsports Engineering	(United States) #89 McCumbee McAleer Racing	(United States) #96 JTR Motorsports Engineering
2	R1	St. Petersburg	(United States) Glenn McGee	(United States) Justin Piscitell	(United States) Jared Thomas
2	R2	St. Petersburg	(United States) #23 JTR Motorsports Engineering	(United States) #89 McCumbee McAleer Racing	(United States) #87 Hixon Motor Sports
2	R2	St. Petersburg	(United States) Glenn McGee	(United States) Justin Piscitell	(United States) Selin Rollan
3	R1	Mid-Ohio	(United States) #76 McCumbee McAleer Racing	(United States) #28 McCumbee McAleer Racing	(United States) #5 Spark Performance
3	R1	Mid-Ohio	(United States) Matthew Dirks	(United States) Sam Paley	(United States) Gresham Wagner
3	R2	Mid-Ohio	(United States) #76 McCumbee McAleer Racing	(United States) #08 Carter Racing Enterprises	(United States) #96 JTR Motorsports Engineering
3	R2	Mid-Ohio	(United States) Matthew Dirks	(United States) Michael Carter	(United States) Jared Thomas
4	R1	Watkins Glen	(United States) #72 Hixon Motor Sports	(United States) #21 Hixon Motor Sports	(United States) #51 Copeland Motorsports
4	R1	Watkins Glen	(United States) Connor Zilisch	(United States) Bruno Carneiro	(United States) Tyler Gonzalez
4	R2	Watkins Glen	(United States) #24 Spark Performance	(United States) #76 McCumbee McAleer Racing	(United States) #15 McCumbee McAleer Racing
4	R2	Watkins Glen	(United States) Aaron Jeansonne	(United States) Matthew Dirks	(United States) Aidan Fassnacht
5	R1	Road America	(United States) #72 Hixon Motor Sports	(United States) #5 Spark Performance	(United States) #72 Hixon Motor Sports
5	R1	Road America	(United States) Connor Zilisch	(United States) Gresham Wagner	(United States) Connor Zilisch
5	R2	Road America	(United States) #72 Hixon Motor Sports	(United States) #5 Spark Performance	(United States) #72 Hixon Motor Sports
5	R2	Road America	(United States) Connor Zilisch	(United States) Gresham Wagner	(United States) Connor Zilisch
6	R1	Virginia	(United States) #15 McCumbee McAleer Racing	(United States) #51 Copeland Motorsports	(United States) #51 Copeland Motorsports
6	R1	Virginia	(United States) Aidan Fassnacht	(United States) Tyler Gonzalez	(United States) Tyler Gonzalez
6	R2	Virginia	(United States) #15 McCumbee McAleer Racing	(United States) #96 JTR Motorsports Engineering	(United States) #72 Hixon Motor Sports
6	R2	Virginia	(United States) Aidan Fassnacht	(United States) Jared Thomas	(United States) Connor Zilisch
7	R1	Road Atlanta	(United States) #28 McCumbee McAleer Racing	(United States) #76 McCumbee McAleer Racing	(United States) #72 Hixon Motor Sports
7	R1	Road Atlanta	(United States) Sam Paley	(United States) Matthew Dirks	(United States) Connor Zilisch
7	R2	Road Atlanta	(United States) #72 Hixon Motor Sports	(United States) #39 McCumbee McAleer Racing	(United States) #51 Copeland Motorsports
7	R2	Road Atlanta	(United States) Connor Zilisch	(United States) John Jodoin	(United States) Tyler Gonzalez

== Championship Standings ==
=== Points System ===
Championship points are awarded at the finish of each event according to the chart below.

Position	1	2	3	4	5	6	7	8	9	10	11	12	13	14	15	16	17	18	19	20	21	22	23	24	25	26	27	28	29	30+
Points	350	320	300	280	260	250	240	230	220	210	200	190	180	170	160	150	140	130	120	110	100	90	80	70	60	50	40	30	20	10

For each race, bonus points are awarded for the following:

Award	Points
Pole Position	10
Most Race Laps Led	10
Fastest Race Lap	10

- The ten (10) additional points for achieving pole position are not awarded if the starting grid is determined by “Other Means”.
- In the case of a tie for the most laps led, the competitor that finishes the highest in the running order is declared the winner.
- In the case of a tie for the fastest Race lap, the competitor that first achieves the fastest Race lap is declared the winner.

=== Driver's Championship ===
IMSA recognizes driver champions based on the total number of championship points earned during the season.

Pos.	Driver	DAY		STP		MOH^{‡}		WGL		ELK		VIR		ATL		Bonus	Points
1	(United States) Jared Thomas	5	1	1	6	2	1	5	3	26	2	17	4	5	8	50	3610
2	(United States) Connor Zilisch	4	**7**	17	2	17	17	**22**	6	**1**	**1**	2	1	1	**6**	90	3600
3	(United States) Gresham Wagner	21	2	2	7	1	5	8	13	3	4	3	2	23	2	50	3465
4	(United States) Selin Rollan	3	6	3	1	6	2	28	11	4	20	19	6	2	7	30	3225
5	(United States) Sam Paley	**9**	5	6	3	9	8	25	8	29	13	5	3	**4**	4	30	3010
6	(United States) Justin Piscitell	16	16	7	4	5	3	7	24	8	5	6	7	22	5	20	2910
7	(United States) Joey Atanasio	12	3	4	14	12	4	2	9	12	19	26	26	7	3	0	2815
8	(United States) Matthew Dirks	26	27	19	9	**3**	**16**	24	7	7	3	4	5	6	16	35	2565
9	(United States) Jenson Altzman	19	30	11	17	19	9	6	21	10	9	12	10	10	11	0	2400
10	(United States) Aaron Jeansonne	10	17	12	8	16	14	4	**23**	6	6	20	20	11	22	10	2395
11	(United States) Tyler Gonzalez	1	20	28	10	26	7	1	28			1	24	3	1	10	2390
12	(United States) Glenn McGee	15	15	**8**	**20**	15	15	23	12	13	7	9	15	23	21	20	2160
13	(Brazil) Bruno Carneiro	6	11	9	13	11	12	9	2	5	21	27	DNS			10	2110
14	(United States) Chris Nunes	2	4	5	19	23	13	10	19	9	8	25	25			0	2100
15	(United States) Alex Bachoura	24	14	21	16	19	20	12	15	16	15	10	13	8	19	0	2060
16	(United States) David Staab	11	12	20	12	20	23	19	18	18	12	16	18	15	13	0	2015
17	(United States) Aidan Fassnacht	17	23	25	25	12	11	3	1	23	27	**7**	**22**	19	23	20	1945
18	(United States) Laura Hayes	20	24	22	15	25	25	18	17	11	11	13	11	17	15	0	1870
19	(United States) John Jodoin	18	26	24	18	13	18	16	15	28	10	28	12	12	12	10	1860
20	(United States) Maximilian Opalski	8	25	DNS	DNS	14	12	13	14	24	DNS	8	17	18	9	0	1705
21	(United States) Jameson Riley	23	9	10	11	24	29	14	10	19	23	15	14	DNS	DNS	0	1675
22	(United States) Woody Heimann	30	8	18	27	22	24	21	16	14	17	22	16	16	17	0	1605
23	(United States) Michael Carter	7	29	13	5	4	19	15	27	2	22					10	1580
24	(United States) Bryce Cornet	13	10	26	26	8	6	11	4	30	24	23	DNS			0	1485
25	(United States) Anthony McIntosh	22	28	29	21	18	21	29	29	15	26			14	14	0	985
26	(United States) Michael Staab	28	18	23	28	28	28			28	DNS	24	23	21	20	0	820
27	(Brazil) Bruno Smielevski											14	8	13	18	0	710
28	(United States) Dante Tornello	27	21	30	25			17	22	22	14					0	700
29	(United States) Ethan Tyler					27	27	27	25	17	18	18	21			0	665
30	(United States) Sean Varwig	14	13	15	24											0	580
31	(Russia) Moisey Uretsky	29	19	16	DNS	29	22	26	26	27	DNS					0	535
32	(United States) Rossi Lee	DNS	DNS	14	DNS	21	26					21	19			0	490
33	(United States) James Hayosh							20	20	21	16					0	470
34	(United States) Cameron Lawrence													9	10	0	430
35	(United States) Thomas Annunziata											11	9			0	420
36	(United States) Matt Curry	25	20													0	170
37	(United States) Parker Kligerman									20	25					0	170
38	(United States) Mickey Thomas			27	23											0	120
39	(United States) Mark Kvamme													20	DNS	0	110
Pos.	Driver	DAY		STP		MOH^{‡}		WGL		ELK		VIR		ATL		Bonus	Points

Colour	Result
Gold	Winner
Silver	Second place
Bronze	Third place
Green	Points classification
Blue	Non-points classification
Blue	Non-classified finish (NC)
Purple	Retired, not classified (Ret)
Red	Did not qualify (DNQ)
Red	Did not pre-qualify (DNPQ)
Black	Disqualified (DSQ)
White	Did not start (DNS)
White	Withdrew (WD)
White	Race cancelled (C)
Blank	Did not practice (DNP)
Blank	Did not arrive (DNA)
Blank	Excluded (EX)

**Bold** - Pole position

Italics - Fastest lap

Underline = Most Laps Led

‡: Race 1 at Mid-Ohio shortened due to weather, half points awarded except for pole position bonus points.

=== Entrant's Championship ===
Each entrant receives championship points for its highest car finishing position in each race. The positions of subsequent finishing cars from the same entrant are not considered in the results and all other cars are elevated in the finishing positions accordingly.

Pos.	Driver	DAY		STP		MOH^{‡}		WGL		ELK		VIR		ATL		Bonus	Points
1	(United States) Hixon Motor Sports	3	**6**	3	1	6	2	**9**	2	29	**1**	2	1	1	**6**	130	4340
2	(United States) McCumbee McAleer Racing	**9**	5	6	3	**3**	3	3	1	7	3	**4**	**3**	**4**	4	125	4085
3	(United States) JTR Motorsports Engineering	5	1	**1**	6	2	1	5	3	13	2	9	4	5	8	70	4300
4	(United States) Spark Performance	10	2	2	7	1	5	4	**13**	3	4	3	2	8	2	60	3935
5	(United States) Copeland Motorsports	1	9	10	10	14	7	1	10	19	23	1	14	3	1	10	3800
6	(United States) Formidable Racing	2	3	4	14	12	4	2	9	9	8	25	25	7	3	0	3675
7	(United States) Slipstream Performance	11	12	20	12	20	23	19	18	18	12	16	18	15	13	0	3165
8	(United States) Thunder Bunny Racing	20	24	22	15	25	25	18	17	11	11	13	11	17	15	0	3160
9	(United States) Carter Racing Enterprises	7	29	13	5	4	19	15	27	2	22					10	2420
Pos.	Driver	DAY		STP		MOH^{‡}		WGL		ELK		VIR		ATL		Bonus	Points

‡: Race 1 at Mid-Ohio shortened due to weather, half points awarded except for pole position bonus points.
