= SKUSA SuperNationals =

Kart racing championship in Las Vegas, Nevada

(United States) SKUSA SuperNationals
- Logo of the 2024 edition
- Category: Kart racing
- Region: United States
- Inaugural season: 1997; 29 years ago
- Classes: 11 (Pro Shifter, Pro X30, Rotax Senior, KA100 Senior, Master Shifter, KA100 Master, X30 Junior, KA100 Junior, Mini Swift, Rotax Mini, Micro Swift)
- Drivers' champion: (France) Emilien Denner; (Pro Shifter); (Argentina) Alessandro de Tullio; (Pro X30); (United States) Erik Doan; (Rotax Senior); (Switzerland) Dan Allemann; (KA100 Senior); (United States) Jordon Musser; (Master Shifter); (United States) Renato Jader; (KA100 Master); (United States) Lucas Palacio; (X30 Junior); (United States) Lucas Palacio; (KA100 Junior); (United States) Mason Brody; (Mini Swift); (United States) Zayne Burgess; (Rotax Mini); (United States) Enzo Ramos; (Micro Swift)
- Official website: Official website

The Superkarts! USA (SKUSA; /skuːzə/ SKOO-zə) SuperNationals, also known as the SKUSA SuperNats, is a kart racing competition organized by Superkarts! USA, taking place in and around Las Vegas, Nevada. Hosted annually since 1997, it is the largest karting competition in North America.

Several past entrants have progressed to premier motor racing series, such as Formula One, the NASCAR Cup Series, and the IndyCar Series. These have included two Formula One World Drivers' Champions: Michael Schumacher and Max Verstappen.

== History ==
The Superkarts! USA (SKUSA) SuperNationals was inaugurated in November 1997. While 1997 is recognized as the official start of the SuperNationals, the event evolved from a prior race organized by shifter kart enthusiast JR Clasen. In 1997, the manager of SKUSA, Jim Murley, took control of the event with the aim of growing the sport in the United States.

The inaugural event was held at Race Kart City Raceway, later known as the Las Vegas Karting Center, and attracted over 180 entries across multiple categories. Alex Barron emerged as the winner of the highly competitive 125cc Moto class, one of the event’s premier divisions.

Over the years, the SuperNationals has been hosted at five different venues across Las Vegas:

- Las Vegas Karting Complex (formally known as the Race Kart City Raceway)
- Rio All-Suite Hotel and Casino
- Sam Boyd Stadium
- Las Vegas Convention Center
- Las Vegas Motor Speedway

The Rio All-Suite Hotel & Casino hosted the most SuperNationals with 12. The SuperNationals are now hosted at the Las Vegas Motor Speedway, where SKUSA signed a three-year agreement to host the event through 2025.

The SKUSA SuperNationals has grown into an internationally recognized event, attracting top karting talent and professional drivers from various disciplines, including Formula One, IndyCar, NASCAR, and rallying:

- Formula One drivers: Michael Schumacher (2009), Max Verstappen (2012), Sergio Pérez (2016), Charles Leclerc (2012), George Russell (2011), Lance Stroll (2012), and Logan Sargeant (2011).
- Other notable entrants: Will Power (2022), Sébastien Bourdais (2013), Dan Wheldon (2009), Alexander Rossi (2016), and Josef Newgarden (2021).

The 2023 edition featured over 500 competitors across seven categories. SKUSA SuperNationals XXVII, the 2024 edition, featured over US$44,000 in cash prizes.

== Winners ==
| Year | Driver | Class | Location |
|---|---|---|---|
| SuperNationals I (1997) | (United States) Alex Barron | 125cc Moto | Las Vegas Karting Center |
| SuperNationals I (1997) | (Canada) Michael Valiante | 125cc Open | Las Vegas Karting Center |
| SuperNationals I (1997) | (Canada) Steven Robertson | 80cc Junior | Las Vegas Karting Center |
| SuperNationals II (1998) | (Canada) Michael Valiante | ProNational | Las Vegas Karting Center |
| SuperNationals II (1998) | (United States) Darren Elliott | Formula S1 | Las Vegas Karting Center |
| SuperNationals II (1998) | (United States) Craig Taverna | Formula S2 | Las Vegas Karting Center |
| SuperNationals II (1998) | (United States) Tim Dobbins | 250cc Moto | Las Vegas Karting Center |
| SuperNationals II (1998) | (United States) Scott Speed | 80cc Senior | Las Vegas Karting Center |
| SuperNationals II (1998) | (United States) Matt Jaskol | 80cc Junior | Las Vegas Karting Center |
| SuperNationals II (1998) | (United States) JJ Langan | 60cc Novice | Las Vegas Karting Center |
| SuperNationals III (1999) | (United States) Memo Gidley | Formula S1 | Las Vegas Karting Center |
| SuperNationals III (1999) | (United States) AJ Noud | Formula S2 | Las Vegas Karting Center |
| SuperNationals III (1999) | (Canada) Michael Valiante | Formula C | Las Vegas Karting Center |
| SuperNationals III (1999) | (United States) Dave Fultz | 250cc Moto | Las Vegas Karting Center |
| SuperNationals III (1999) | (United States) Bret Buckwalter | Formula K1 | Las Vegas Karting Center |
| SuperNationals III (1999) | (United States) JJ Langan | 80cc Junior | Las Vegas Karting Center |
| SuperNationals III (1999) | (United States) Joel Miller | 60cc Novice | Las Vegas Karting Center |
| SuperNationals IV (2000) | (United States) Scott Speed | SuperPro | Las Vegas Karting Center |
| SuperNationals IV (2000) | (United States) Michael Abbate | Formula S1 | Las Vegas Karting Center |
| SuperNationals IV (2000) | (United States) Richard Luchette | 250cc Moto | Las Vegas Karting Center |
| SuperNationals IV (2000) | (United States) Cory Fancy | 80cc Senior | Las Vegas Karting Center |
| SuperNationals IV (2000) | (United States) Kirk Jeffrey | Formula G1 | Las Vegas Karting Center |
| SuperNationals IV (2000) | (United States) Alex Speed | 80cc Junior | Las Vegas Karting Center |
| SuperNationals IV (2000) | (United States) Greg Welch | 60cc Novice | Las Vegas Karting Center |
| SuperNationals V (2001) | (United States) Scott Speed | SuperPro | Las Vegas Karting Center |
| SuperNationals V (2001) | (United States) Alex Speed | Formula S1 | Las Vegas Karting Center |
| SuperNationals V (2001) | (United States) Brandon Scarberry | Formula S2 | Las Vegas Karting Center |
| SuperNationals V (2001) | (United States) Charlie Kimball | Formula K1 | Las Vegas Karting Center |
| SuperNationals V (2001) | (Brazil) Eduardo Martins | Formula G1 | Las Vegas Karting Center |
| SuperNationals V (2001) | (United States) Wade Van Hooser | 80cc Junior | Las Vegas Karting Center |
| SuperNationals V (2001) | (United States) RJ McGahey | 60cc Novice | Las Vegas Karting Center |
| SuperNationals VI (2002) | (United States) David Jurca | SuperPro | Rio All-Suite Hotel & Casino |
| SuperNationals VI (2002) | (United States) Tad Funakoshi | Formula S1 | Rio All-Suite Hotel & Casino |
| SuperNationals VI (2002) | (United States) Garrett Zine | Formula K1 | Rio All-Suite Hotel & Casino |
| SuperNationals VI (2002) | (United States) Bill Fleming | Formula G1 | Rio All-Suite Hotel & Casino |
| SuperNationals VI (2002) | (United States) Brandon Scarberry | 125cc Formula MX | Rio All-Suite Hotel & Casino |
| SuperNationals VI (2002) | (United States) Alan Sciuto | Formula Junior | Rio All-Suite Hotel & Casino |
| SuperNationals VI (2002) | (United States) Cody Jolly | 60cc Novice | Rio All-Suite Hotel & Casino |
| SuperNationals VII (2003) | (United States) Wesley Boswell | SuperPro | Rio All-Suite Hotel & Casino |
| SuperNationals VII (2003) | (Canada) Tyler Givogue | Formula S1 | Rio All-Suite Hotel & Casino |
| SuperNationals VII (2003) | (United States) Todd DeGrand | Formula K1 | Rio All-Suite Hotel & Casino |
| SuperNationals VII (2003) | (United States) Burt Gasaway | Formula G1 | Rio All-Suite Hotel & Casino |
| SuperNationals VII (2003) | (United States) Cole Whitt | 80cc Junior | Rio All-Suite Hotel & Casino |
| SuperNationals VII (2003) | (United States) Gustavo Menezes | 80cc Novice | Rio All-Suite Hotel & Casino |
| SuperNationals VII (2003) | (United States) Zach Zimmerly | 60cc Novice | Rio All-Suite Hotel & Casino |
| SuperNationals VIII (2004) | (United States) Jason Bowles | SuperPro | Sam Boyd Stadium |
| SuperNationals VIII (2004) | (United States) Brian Keck | Formula S1 | Sam Boyd Stadium |
| SuperNationals VIII (2004) | (United States) Matt Kimball | Formula K1 | Sam Boyd Stadium |
| SuperNationals VIII (2004) | (South Africa) Toby Scheckter | TaG Senior | Sam Boyd Stadium |
| SuperNationals VIII (2004) | (United States) Bonnier Moulton | Formula G1 | Sam Boyd Stadium |
| SuperNationals VIII (2004) | (Canada) Michael Brookes | TaG Master | Sam Boyd Stadium |
| SuperNationals VIII (2004) | (United States) Kevin Casey | Formula S3 | Sam Boyd Stadium |
| SuperNationals VIII (2004) | (United States) Jeremy Reagles | Formula K2 | Sam Boyd Stadium |
| SuperNationals VIII (2004) | (United States) Gustavo Menezes | Formula K3 | Sam Boyd Stadium |
| SuperNationals IX (2005) | (Canada) Lorenzo Mandarino | SuperPro | Sam Boyd Stadium |
| SuperNationals IX (2005) | (United States) Logan Gomez | Formula S1 | Sam Boyd Stadium |
| SuperNationals IX (2005) | (United States) David Jurca | TaG Senior | Sam Boyd Stadium |
| SuperNationals IX (2005) | (Colombia) Jaime Zuleta | Formula G1 | Sam Boyd Stadium |
| SuperNationals IX (2005) | (United States) John Crow | TaG Master | Sam Boyd Stadium |
| SuperNationals IX (2005) | (United States) Connor De Phillippi | Junior Intercontinental A | Sam Boyd Stadium |
| SuperNationals IX (2005) | (United States) Nick Halen | Stock Honda | Sam Boyd Stadium |
| SuperNationals IX (2005) | (United States) Dylan Kwasniewski | Novice | Sam Boyd Stadium |
| SuperNationals IX (2005) | (United States) Kyle Shriver | Cadet | Sam Boyd Stadium |
| SuperNationals X (2006) | (United States) Gary Carlton | SuperPro | Sam Boyd Stadium |
| SuperNationals X (2006) | (United States) James Kennedy | Formula S1 | Sam Boyd Stadium |
| SuperNationals X (2006) | (Canada) Daniel Morad | TaG Senior | Sam Boyd Stadium |
| SuperNationals X (2006) | (United States) Darren Elliott | Formula G1 | Sam Boyd Stadium |
| SuperNationals X (2006) | (United States) Travis Irving | TaG Master | Sam Boyd Stadium |
| SuperNationals X (2006) | (United States) Connor De Phillippi | S3 Spec Honda Light | Sam Boyd Stadium |
| SuperNationals X (2006) | (United States) Jeff Littrell | S4 Spec Honda Heavy | Sam Boyd Stadium |
| SuperNationals XI (2007) | (Italy) Marco Ardigo | SuperPro | Sam Boyd Stadium |
| SuperNationals XI (2007) | (United States) Connor De Phillippi | Formula S1 | Sam Boyd Stadium |
| SuperNationals XI (2007) | (Canada) Pier-Luc Ouellette | Rotax Senior | Sam Boyd Stadium |
| SuperNationals XI (2007) | (United States) Joel Miller | TaG Senior | Sam Boyd Stadium |
| SuperNationals XI (2007) | (United States) Darren Elliott | Formula G1 | Sam Boyd Stadium |
| SuperNationals XI (2007) | (United States) Jerry Henderson | TaG Master | Sam Boyd Stadium |
| SuperNationals XI (2007) | (United States) Paul Bonilla | Rotax Master | Sam Boyd Stadium |
| SuperNationals XI (2007) | (United States) Tom Dyer | Formula S3 | Sam Boyd Stadium |
| SuperNationals XI (2007) | (United States) Jeff Littrell | Formula S4 | Sam Boyd Stadium |
| SuperNationals XI (2007) | (United States) Brendan Phinny | Formula S5 | Sam Boyd Stadium |
| SuperNationals XII (2008) | (Belgium) Jonathan Thonon | SuperPro | Rio All-Suite Hotel & Casino |
| SuperNationals XII (2008) | (Venezuela) Jose Zanella | Formula S1 | Rio All-Suite Hotel & Casino |
| SuperNationals XII (2008) | (Italy) Emanuele Pagani | TaG Senior | Rio All-Suite Hotel & Casino |
| SuperNationals XII (2008) | (United States) Collin Lynn | Formula G1 | Rio All-Suite Hotel & Casino |
| SuperNationals XII (2008) | (United States) Billy Cleavelin | TaG Master | Rio All-Suite Hotel & Casino |
| SuperNationals XII (2008) | (United States) Devin Mauk | Formula S5 Junior | Rio All-Suite Hotel & Casino |
| SuperNationals XII (2008) | (Brazil) Felipe Fraga | TaG Junior | Rio All-Suite Hotel & Casino |
| SuperNationals XII (2008) | (United States) Tommy Andersen | HPV-2 Junior | Rio All-Suite Hotel & Casino |
| SuperNationals XII (2008) | (United States) Brendan Phinny | Formula S3 | Rio All-Suite Hotel & Casino |
| SuperNationals XII (2008) | (United States) Chris Jennings | Formula S4 | Rio All-Suite Hotel & Casino |
| SuperNationals XIII (2009) | (Netherlands) Bas Lammers | SuperPro | Rio All-Suite Hotel & Casino |
| SuperNationals XIII (2009) | (United States) Taylor Miinch | TaG Senior | Rio All-Suite Hotel & Casino |
| SuperNationals XIII (2009) | (Denmark) Nicolaj Møller Madsen | Formula KF2 | Rio All-Suite Hotel & Casino |
| SuperNationals XIII (2009) | (Italy) Antonio Dettori | Formula G1 | Rio All-Suite Hotel & Casino |
| SuperNationals XIII (2009) | (United States) Billy Cleavelin | TaG Master | Rio All-Suite Hotel & Casino |
| SuperNationals XIII (2009) | (United States) Kiel Spaulding | Formula S5 Junior | Rio All-Suite Hotel & Casino |
| SuperNationals XIII (2009) | (United Kingdom) Jake Dennis | TaG Junior | Rio All-Suite Hotel & Casino |
| SuperNationals XIII (2009) | (United States) Tom Dyer | Formula S3 | Rio All-Suite Hotel & Casino |
| SuperNationals XIII (2009) | (United States) Jeff Littrell | Formula S4 | Rio All-Suite Hotel & Casino |
| SuperNationals XIV (2010) | (United States) Alex Speed | Formula S1 | Rio All-Suite Hotel & Casino |
| SuperNationals XIV (2010) | (Italy) Marco Ardigo | Formula KZ2 | Rio All-Suite Hotel & Casino |
| SuperNationals XIV (2010) | (Brazil) Andre Nicastro | TaG Senior | Rio All-Suite Hotel & Casino |
| SuperNationals XIV (2010) | (Belgium) Sami Luka | Formula KF2 | Rio All-Suite Hotel & Casino |
| SuperNationals XIV (2010) | (United States) Derek Crockett | Formula S2 | Rio All-Suite Hotel & Casino |
| SuperNationals XIV (2010) | (United States) Jimmy McNeil | Formula S4 | Rio All-Suite Hotel & Casino |
| SuperNationals XIV (2010) | (Italy) Fabrizio Nannini | Formula G1 | Rio All-Suite Hotel & Casino |
| SuperNationals XIV (2010) | (Brazil) Leonardo Nienkotter | TaG Master | Rio All-Suite Hotel & Casino |
| SuperNationals XIV (2010) | (United States) Daniel Langon | Formula S5 | Rio All-Suite Hotel & Casino |
| SuperNationals XIV (2010) | (Brazil) Joao Ricardo Queiroz Vieira | TaG Junior | Rio All-Suite Hotel & Casino |
| SuperNationals XIV (2010) | (Mexico) Patricio O'Ward | TaG Cadet | Rio All-Suite Hotel & Casino |
| SuperNationals XV (2011) | (Italy) Mirko Torsellini | Formula S1 | Rio All-Suite Hotel & Casino |
| SuperNationals XV (2011) | (France) Anthony Abbasse | Formula KZ2 | Rio All-Suite Hotel & Casino |
| SuperNationals XV (2011) | (Canada) Phillip Orcic | TaG Senior | Rio All-Suite Hotel & Casino |
| SuperNationals XV (2011) | (Finland) Teemu Suninen | Formula KF2 | Rio All-Suite Hotel & Casino |
| SuperNationals XV (2011) | (United States) Nick Neri | Formula S2 | Rio All-Suite Hotel & Casino |
| SuperNationals XV (2011) | (United States) Bonnier Moulton | Formula S4 | Rio All-Suite Hotel & Casino |
| SuperNationals XV (2011) | (United States) Jimmy McNeil | Formula G1 | Rio All-Suite Hotel & Casino |
| SuperNationals XV (2011) | (Brazil) Leonardo Nienkotter | TaG Master | Rio All-Suite Hotel & Casino |
| SuperNationals XV (2011) | (United States) Austin Schimmel | Formula S5 | Rio All-Suite Hotel & Casino |
| SuperNationals XV (2011) | (United Kingdom) George Russell | TaG Junior | Rio All-Suite Hotel & Casino |
| SuperNationals XV (2011) | (United States) Logan Sargeant | TaG Cadet | Rio All-Suite Hotel & Casino |
| SuperNationals XVI (2012) | (Lithuania) Simas Juodvirsis | Formula S1 | Rio All-Suite Hotel & Casino |
| SuperNationals XVI (2012) | (Italy) Marco Ardigo | Formula KZ2 | Rio All-Suite Hotel & Casino |
| SuperNationals XVI (2012) | (Colombia) Gabriel Chaves | TaG Senior | Rio All-Suite Hotel & Casino |
| SuperNationals XVI (2012) | (United States) Billy Musgrave | Formula S2 | Rio All-Suite Hotel & Casino |
| SuperNationals XVI (2012) | (United States) Bonnier Moulton | Formula S4 | Rio All-Suite Hotel & Casino |
| SuperNationals XVI (2012) | (Brazil) Leonardo Nienkotter | TaG Master | Rio All-Suite Hotel & Casino |
| SuperNationals XVI (2012) | (Mexico) Patricio O'Ward | Formula S5 | Rio All-Suite Hotel & Casino |
| SuperNationals XVI (2012) | (Canada) Lance Stroll | TaG Junior | Rio All-Suite Hotel & Casino |
| SuperNationals XVI (2012) | (United States) Anthony Gangi Jr. | TaG Cadet | Rio All-Suite Hotel & Casino |
| SuperNationals XVII (2013) | (United States) Joey Wimsett | Formula S1 | Rio All-Suite Hotel & Casino |
| SuperNationals XVII (2013) | (France) Anthony Abbasse | Formula KZ2 | Rio All-Suite Hotel & Casino |
| SuperNationals XVII (2013) | (Australia) Nicholas Rowe | TaG Senior | Rio All-Suite Hotel & Casino |
| SuperNationals XVII (2013) | (Canada) Ben Cooper | DD2 | Rio All-Suite Hotel & Casino |
| SuperNationals XVII (2013) | (United States) Connor Wagner | Formula S2 | Rio All-Suite Hotel & Casino |
| SuperNationals XVII (2013) | (New Zealand) Matthew Hamilton | Formula S4 | Rio All-Suite Hotel & Casino |
| SuperNationals XVII (2013) | (United States) Jim Russell Jr. | TaG Master | Rio All-Suite Hotel & Casino |
| SuperNationals XVII (2013) | (Canada) Stuart Clark | DD2 Master | Rio All-Suite Hotel & Casino |
| SuperNationals XVII (2013) | (United States) Kyle Kirkwood | Formula S5 | Rio All-Suite Hotel & Casino |
| SuperNationals XVII (2013) | (Brazil) Yurik Carvalho | TaG Junior | Rio All-Suite Hotel & Casino |
| SuperNationals XVII (2013) | (Austria) Thomas Preining | Rotax Junior | Rio All-Suite Hotel & Casino |
| SuperNationals XVII (2013) | (Italy) Leonardo Marseglia | TaG Cadet | Rio All-Suite Hotel & Casino |
| SuperNationals XVIII (2014) | (United Kingdom) Jordon Lennox | Formula S1 | Rio All-Suite Hotel & Casino |
| SuperNationals XVIII (2014) | (Italy) Paolo de Conto | Formula KZ2 | Rio All-Suite Hotel & Casino |
| SuperNationals XVIII (2014) | (Italy) Marco Maestranzi | TaG Senior | Rio All-Suite Hotel & Casino |
| SuperNationals XVIII (2014) | (United States) Jarred Campbell | Formula S2 | Rio All-Suite Hotel & Casino |
| SuperNationals XVIII (2014) | (Australia) Kip Foster | TaG Master | Rio All-Suite Hotel & Casino |
| SuperNationals XVIII (2014) | (Mexico) Raul Guzman | Formula S5 | Rio All-Suite Hotel & Casino |
| SuperNationals XVIII (2014) | (Italy) Gian Cavaciuti | Formula S4 | Rio All-Suite Hotel & Casino |
| SuperNationals XVIII (2014) | (United States) Logan Sargeant | TaG Junior | Rio All-Suite Hotel & Casino |
| SuperNationals XVIII (2014) | (Italy) Guiseppe Fusco | TaG Cadet | Rio All-Suite Hotel & Casino |
| SuperNationals XIX (2015) | (Costa Rica) Danny Formal | Formula S1 | Las Vegas Convention Center |
| SuperNationals XIX (2015) | (United States) Gary Carlton | Formula KZ2 | Las Vegas Convention Center |
| SuperNationals XIX (2015) | (United States) Louie Pagano | TaG Senior | Las Vegas Convention Center |
| SuperNationals XIX (2015) | (Italy) Dario Capitano | Formula S2 | Las Vegas Convention Center |
| SuperNationals XIX (2015) | (Australia) Kip Foster | TaG Master | Las Vegas Convention Center |
| SuperNationals XIX (2015) | (United States) Hunter Kelly | Formula S5 | Las Vegas Convention Center |
| SuperNationals XIX (2015) | (United States) Jimmy McNeil | Formula S4 | Las Vegas Convention Center |
| SuperNationals XIX (2015) | (Brazil) Arthur Leist | TaG Junior | Las Vegas Convention Center |
| SuperNationals XIX (2015) | (United Kingdom) Jonny Edgar | TaG Cadet | Las Vegas Convention Center |
| SuperNationals XX (2016) | (Costa Rica) Danny Formal | Formula S1 | Las Vegas Convention Center |
| SuperNationals XX (2016) | (Italy) Paolo De Conto | Formula KZ2 | Las Vegas Convention Center |
| SuperNationals XX (2016) | (United States) Jake Craig | X30 Senior | Las Vegas Convention Center |
| SuperNationals XX (2016) | (United States) Mathias Ramirez | Formula S2 | Las Vegas Convention Center |
| SuperNationals XX (2016) | (Brazil) Renato David | X30 Master | Las Vegas Convention Center |
| SuperNationals XX (2016) | (Italy) Gian Cavaciuti | Formula S4 | Las Vegas Convention Center |
| SuperNationals XX (2016) | (United States) Robert Marks | Formula S4 Super | Las Vegas Convention Center |
| SuperNationals XX (2016) | (United States) Tyler Gonzalez | X30 Junior | Las Vegas Convention Center |
| SuperNationals XX (2016) | (Canada) Thomas Nepveu | Mini Swift | Las Vegas Convention Center |
| SuperNationals XX (2016) | (Brazil) Vinicius Tessaro | Micro Swift | Las Vegas Convention Center |
| SuperNationals XXI (2017) | (United States) Billy Musgrave | Formula S1 | Las Vegas Convention Center |
| SuperNationals XXI (2017) | (Italy) Paolo De Conto | Formula KZ | Las Vegas Convention Center |
| SuperNationals XXI (2017) | (Australia) Joshua Car | X30 Senior | Las Vegas Convention Center |
| SuperNationals XXI (2017) | (France) Laurent Marchandise | Formula S2 | Las Vegas Convention Center |
| SuperNationals XXI (2017) | (Australia) Kris Walton | X30 Master | Las Vegas Convention Center |
| SuperNationals XXI (2017) | (United Kingdom) Ryan Kinnear | Formula S4 | Las Vegas Convention Center |
| SuperNationals XXI (2017) | (United States) Mike Jones | Formula S4 Super | Las Vegas Convention Center |
| SuperNationals XXI (2017) | (United States) Jak Crawford | X30 Junior | Las Vegas Convention Center |
| SuperNationals XXI (2017) | (United States) Connor Zilisch | Mini Swift | Las Vegas Convention Center |
| SuperNationals XXI (2017) | (United Kingdom) Vinnie Phillips | Micro Swift | Las Vegas Convention Center |
| SuperNationals XXII (2018) | (United States) Billy Musgrave | Pro Shifter | Rio All-Suite Hotel & Casino |
| SuperNationals XXII (2018) | (Italy) Leonardo Lorandi | Formula KZ | Rio All-Suite Hotel & Casino |
| SuperNationals XXII (2018) | (Canada) Ben Cooper | X30 Senior | Rio All-Suite Hotel & Casino |
| SuperNationals XXII (2018) | (United States) Steve Barros | KA100 Senior | Rio All-Suite Hotel & Casino |
| SuperNationals XXII (2018) | (United States) Rob Logan | Master Shifter | Rio All-Suite Hotel & Casino |
| SuperNationals XXII (2018) | (United States) Jeremy Fairbairn | X30 Junior | Rio All-Suite Hotel & Casino |
| SuperNationals XXII (2018) | (Australia) James Wharton | KA100 Junior | Rio All-Suite Hotel & Casino |
| SuperNationals XXII (2018) | (United States) Brent Crews | Mini Swift | Rio All-Suite Hotel & Casino |
| SuperNationals XXII (2018) | (United States) Ben Maier | Micro Swift | Rio All-Suite Hotel & Casino |
| SuperNationals XXIII (2019) | (United States) Billy Musgrave | Pro Shifter | Rio All-Suite Hotel & Casino |
| SuperNationals XXIII (2019) | (United States) Race Liberante | Pro Shifter 2 | Rio All-Suite Hotel & Casino |
| SuperNationals XXIII (2019) | (Costa Rica) Danny Formal | Formula KZ | Rio All-Suite Hotel & Casino |
| SuperNationals XXIII (2019) | (Canada) Zachary Claman-DeMelo | X30 Senior | Rio All-Suite Hotel & Casino |
| SuperNationals XXIII (2019) | (United States) Pauly Massimino | KA100 Senior | Rio All-Suite Hotel & Casino |
| SuperNationals XXIII (2019) | (Australia) Kip Foster | X30 Master | Rio All-Suite Hotel & Casino |
| SuperNationals XXIII (2019) | (New Zealand) Matt Hamilton | Formula G1 | Rio All-Suite Hotel & Casino |
| SuperNationals XXIII (2019) | (United States) Nathan Stewart | Formula G2 | Rio All-Suite Hotel & Casino |
| SuperNationals XXIII (2019) | (Australia) James Wharton | X30 Junior | Rio All-Suite Hotel & Casino |
| SuperNationals XXIII (2019) | (United States) Brent Crews | KA100 Junior | Rio All-Suite Hotel & Casino |
| SuperNationals XXIII (2019) | (United States) Kai Sorensen | Mini Swift | Rio All-Suite Hotel & Casino |
| SuperNationals XXIII (2019) | (Australia) Bradley Majman | Micro Swift | Rio All-Suite Hotel & Casino |
| SuperNationals XXIV (2021) | (Italy) Matteo Vigano | Pro Shifter | Las Vegas Motor Speedway |
| SuperNationals XXIV (2021) | (United States) Ryan Norberg | X30 Senior | Las Vegas Motor Speedway |
| SuperNationals XXIV (2021) | (United States) Brandon Lemke | KA100 Senior | Las Vegas Motor Speedway |
| SuperNationals XXIV (2021) | (United States) Joey Wimsett | Master Shifter | Las Vegas Motor Speedway |
| SuperNationals XXIV (2021) | (United States) Derek Wang | X30 Master | Las Vegas Motor Speedway |
| SuperNationals XXIV (2021) | (United States) Jeremy Fletcher | X30 Junior | Las Vegas Motor Speedway |
| SuperNationals XXIV (2021) | (United States) Jeremy Fletcher | KA100 Junior | Las Vegas Motor Speedway |
| SuperNationals XXIV (2021) | (Brazil) Enzo Vidmontiene | Mini Swift | Las Vegas Motor Speedway |
| SuperNationals XXIV (2021) | (United States) Keelan Harvick | Micro Swift | Las Vegas Motor Speedway |
| SuperNationals XXV (2022) | (Spain) Pedro Hiltbrand | Pro Shifter | Rio All-Suite Hotel & Casino |
| SuperNationals XXV (2022) | (France) Evan Giltaire | X30 Senior | Rio All-Suite Hotel & Casino |
| SuperNationals XXV (2022) | (Latvia) Tomass Štolcermanis | KA100 Senior | Rio All-Suite Hotel & Casino |
| SuperNationals XXV (2022) | (Brazil) Antonio Pizzonia Jr. | Master Shifter | Rio All-Suite Hotel & Casino |
| SuperNationals XXV (2022) | (United Kingdom) Thomas Grice | X30 Master | Rio All-Suite Hotel & Casino |
| SuperNationals XXV (2022) | (United Kingdom) Martin Stone | KA100 Master | Rio All-Suite Hotel & Casino |
| SuperNationals XXV (2022) | (Mexico) Ernesto Rivera | X30 Junior | Rio All-Suite Hotel & Casino |
| SuperNationals XXV (2022) | (United States) Steven Miller | KA100 Junior | Rio All-Suite Hotel & Casino |
| SuperNationals XXV (2022) | (United States) Michael McGaughy | Mini Swift | Rio All-Suite Hotel & Casino |
| SuperNationals XXV (2022) | (United States) Jackson Gibson | Micro Swift | Rio All-Suite Hotel & Casino |
| SuperNationals XXVI (2023) | (Costa Rica) Danny Formal | Pro Shifter | Las Vegas Motor Speedway |
| SuperNationals XXVI (2023) | (Mexico) Donovan Bonilla | X30 Senior | Las Vegas Motor Speedway |
| SuperNationals XXVI (2023) | (Mexico) Ernesto Rivera | KA100 Senior | Las Vegas Motor Speedway |
| SuperNationals XXVI (2023) | (Italy) Davide Foré | Master Shifter | Las Vegas Motor Speedway |
| SuperNationals XXVI (2023) | (Australia) Matthew Waters | KA100 Master | Las Vegas Motor Speedway |
| SuperNationals XXVI (2023) | (United States) Turner Brown | X30 Junior | Las Vegas Motor Speedway |
| SuperNationals XXVI (2023) | (United States) Turner Brown | KA100 Junior | Las Vegas Motor Speedway |
| SuperNationals XXVI (2023) | (United States) Royce Vega | Mini Swift | Las Vegas Motor Speedway |
| SuperNationals XXVI (2023) | (United States) Maxwell Macha | Micro Swift | Las Vegas Motor Speedway |
| SuperNationals XXVII (2024) | (Romania) Daniel Vasile | Pro Shifter | Las Vegas Motor Speedway |
| SuperNationals XXVII (2024) | (United Kingdom) Joe Turney | Pro X30 | Las Vegas Motor Speedway |
| SuperNationals XXVII (2024) | (United Kingdom) Joe Turney | KA100 Senior | Las Vegas Motor Speedway |
| SuperNationals XXVII (2024) | (United States) Billy Musgrave | Master Shifter | Las Vegas Motor Speedway |
| SuperNationals XXVII (2024) | (Canada) Ben Cooper | KA100 Master | Las Vegas Motor Speedway |
| SuperNationals XXVII (2024) | (Colombia) Sebastián Garzón | X30 Junior | Las Vegas Motor Speedway |
| SuperNationals XXVII (2024) | (Colombia) Sebastián Garzón | KA100 Junior | Las Vegas Motor Speedway |
| SuperNationals XXVII (2024) | (United States) Benja Fernandez | Mini Swift | Las Vegas Motor Speedway |
| SuperNationals XXVII (2024) | (United States) Zayne Burgess | Micro Swift | Las Vegas Motor Speedway |
| SuperNationals XXVIII (2025) | (Netherlands) Senna Van Walstijn | Pro Shifter | Las Vegas Motor Speedway |
| SuperNationals XXVIII (2025) | (United Kingdom) Gus Lawrence | Pro X30 | Las Vegas Motor Speedway |
| SuperNationals XXVIII (2025) | (Brazil) Diego Ramos | KA100 Senior | Las Vegas Motor Speedway |
| SuperNationals XXVIII (2025) | (United States) Billy Musgrave | Master Shifter | Las Vegas Motor Speedway |
| SuperNationals XXVIII (2025) | (Canada) Ben Cooper | KA100 Master | Las Vegas Motor Speedway |
| SuperNationals XXVIII (2025) | (Netherlands) Dean Hoogendoorn | X30 Junior | Las Vegas Motor Speedway |
| SuperNationals XXVIII (2025) | (United Kingdom) Noah Baglin | KA100 Junior | Las Vegas Motor Speedway |
| SuperNationals XXVIII (2025) | (United States) Maxwell Macha | Mini Swift | Las Vegas Motor Speedway |
| SuperNationals XXVIII (2025) | (United States) Dutch Westbrook | Micro Swift | Las Vegas Motor Speedway |
| SuperNationals XXIX (2026) | (France) Emilien Denner | Pro Shifter | Las Vegas Motor Speedway |
| SuperNationals XXIX (2026) | (Argentina) Alessandro de Tullio | Pro X30 | Las Vegas Motor Speedway |
| SuperNationals XXIX (2026) | (United States) Erik Doan | Rotax Senior | Las Vegas Motor Speedway |
| SuperNationals XXIX (2026) | (Switzerland) Dan Allemann | KA100 Senior | Las Vegas Motor Speedway |
| SuperNationals XXIX (2026) | (United States) Jordon Musser | Master Shifter | Las Vegas Motor Speedway |
| SuperNationals XXIX (2026) | (United States) Renato Jader | KA100 Master | Las Vegas Motor Speedway |
| SuperNationals XXIX (2026) | (United States) Lucas Palacio | X30 Junior | Las Vegas Motor Speedway |
| SuperNationals XXIX (2026) | (United States) Lucas Palacio | KA100 Junior | Las Vegas Motor Speedway |
| SuperNationals XXIX (2026) | (United States) Mason Brody | Mini Swift | Las Vegas Motor Speedway |
| SuperNationals XXIX (2026) | (United States) Zayne Burgess | Rotax Mini | Las Vegas Motor Speedway |
| SuperNationals XXIX (2026) | (United States) Enzo Ramos | Micro Swift | Las Vegas Motor Speedway |

== See also ==
- Kart racing
- List of kart racing championships
