= Jenson Altzman =

American racing driver (born 2002)

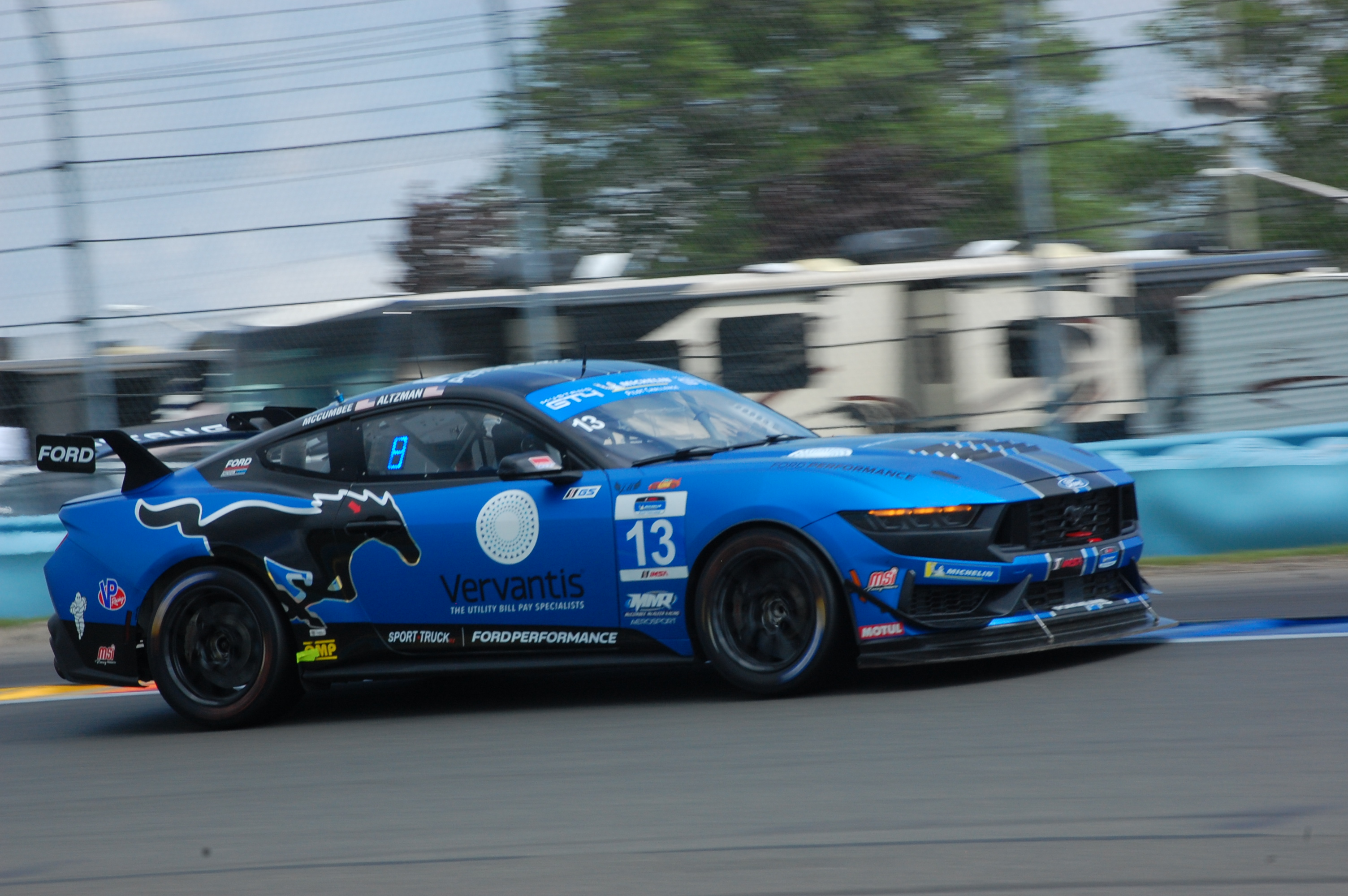
- Altzman in 2025
- Nationality: (United States) American
- Born: April 25, 2002 (age 24) Phoenix, Arizona, U.S.

IMSA SportsCar Championship career
- Debut season: 2025
- Current team: Myers Riley Motorsports
- Categorisation: FIA Silver
- Starts: 5
- Wins: 0
- Podiums: 0
- Poles: 0
- Fastest laps: 0

Previous series
- 2021–2022: Mazda MX-5 Cup
- Statistics up to date as of January 5, 2026.

Jenson Altzman (born April 25, 2002) is an American racing driver who currently competes in the IMSA SportsCar Championship for Myers Riley Motorsports. He is a member of the Ford Racing Junior Team.

== Racing career ==
Altzman participated in the 2026 Rolex 24 at Daytona as part of the Myers Riley Motorsports entry, sharing a Ford Mustang GT3 with Romain Grosjean, Felipe Fraga and Sheena Monk. The team did not finish the race due to major damage from contact throughout the event.

== Karting record ==
=== Karting career summary ===
| Season | Series | Team | Position |
|---|---|---|---|
| 2017 | SKUSA SuperNationals XXI – X30 Senior | Ruthless Karting | 68th |
| 2017 | Challenge of the Americas – Junior Rotax | | 13th |
| 2018 | SKUSA SuperNationals XXII – X30 Senior | Ruthless Karting | 72nd |
| 2018 | SKUSA SuperNationals XXIII – KA100 Senior | Ruthless Karting | 19th |
| 2019 | Rotax Stars & Stripes Trophy – Senior Max | | 8th |
| 2019 | ROK the Rio – Senior ROK | Ruthless Karting | 14th |
| 2019 | SKUSA SuperNationals XXIII – X30 Senior | Ruthless Karting | ? |
| 2019 | SKUSA SuperNationals XXIII – KA100 Senior | Ruthless Karting | 17th |
| 2020 | SKUSA Winter Series – X30 Senior | | ? |
| 2020 | Florida Winter Tour – Senior ROK | Ruthless Karting | 14th |
| 2021 | SKUSA SuperNationals XXIV – KA100 Senior | Ruthless Karting | 58th |

== Racing record ==
=== Career summary ===
| Season | Series | Team | Races | Wins | Poles | F/Laps | Podiums | Points | Position |
|---|---|---|---|---|---|---|---|---|---|
| 2021 | Mazda MX–5 Cup | McCumbee McAleer Racing | 14 | 0 | 0 | 0 | 0 | 2560 | 10th |
| 2022 | Mazda MX–5 Cup | McCumbee McAleer Racing | 14 | 0 | 0 | 0 | 0 | 2400 | 9th |
| 2023 | Michelin Pilot Challenge – GS | McCumbee McAleer Racing with Aerosport | 10 | 0 | 0 | 0 | 2 | 1880 | 7th |
| 2024 | Michelin Pilot Challenge – GS | McCumbee McAleer Racing with Aerosport | 10 | 0 | 0 | 0 | 1 | 1840 | 15th |
| 2025 | Michelin Pilot Challenge – GS | McCumbee McAleer Racing with Aerosport | 10 | 1 | 4 | 0 | 2 | 2460 | 4th |
| 2025 | IMSA SportsCar Championship – GTD | Gradient Racing | 5 | 0 | 0 | 0 | 0 | 1116 | 25th |
| 2025 | IMSA Ford Mustang Challenge – DH | TeamFloral-Vanspringel | 2 | 0 | 0 | 0 | 0 | N/A | NC |
| 2025 | GT4 Australia Series – Silver | Wallis Motorsport | 1 | 0 | 0 | 0 | 0 | 4 | 12th |
| 2026 | IMSA SportsCar Championship – GTD | Myers Riley Motorsports | 5 | 0 | 0 | 0 | 0 | 836 | 42nd |
| 2026 | GT4 America Series - Pro-Am | McCumbee McAleer Racing | | | | | | | |
| 2026 | Michelin Pilot Challenge - GS | McCumbee McAleer Racing | 1 | 0 | 0 | 0 | 0 | 120 | 64th |
| 2026 | GT4 European Series - Silver | Academy Motorsport | | | | | | | |

=== IMSA Michelin Pilot Challenge results ===
(key) (Races in bold indicate pole position; races in italics indicate fastest lap)

| Year | Entrant | Class | Make | Engine | 1 | 2 | 3 | 4 | 5 | 6 | 7 | 8 | 9 | 10 | Rank | Points |
|---|---|---|---|---|---|---|---|---|---|---|---|---|---|---|---|---|
| 2023 | McCumbee McAleer Racing with Aerosport | GS | Ford Mustang GT4 | Ford Voodoo 5.2 L V8 | DAY; 22 | SEB; 14 | LGA; 8 | DET; 11 | WGL; 15 | MOS; 19 | ELK; 3 | VIR; 3 | IMS; 8 | ROA; 23 | 7th | 1880 |
| 2024 | McCumbee McAleer Racing with Aerosport | GS | Ford Mustang GT4 (2024) | Ford Coyote 5.0 L V8 | DAY; 15 | SEB; 3 | LGA; 21 | MDO; 11 | WGL; 17 | MOS; 17 | ELK; 5 | VIR; 9 | IMS; 10 | ROA; 20 | 15th | 1840 |
| 2025 | McCumbee McAleer Racing with Aerosport | GS | Ford Mustang GT4 (2024) | Ford Coyote 5.0 L V8 | DAY; 4 | SEB; 5 | LGA; 11 | MDO; 7 | **WGL**; 2 | **MOS**; 5 | **ELK**; 1 | **VIR**; 11 | IMS; 7 | ROA; 20 | 4th | 2460 |

* Season still in progress.

=== Complete IMSA SportsCar Championship results ===
(key) (Races in bold indicate pole position) (Races in italics indicate fastest lap)

| Year | Entrant | Class | Car | Engine | 1 | 2 | 3 | 4 | 5 | 6 | 7 | 8 | 9 | 10 | Rank | Points |
|---|---|---|---|---|---|---|---|---|---|---|---|---|---|---|---|---|
| 2025 | Gradient Racing | GTD | Ford Mustang GT3 | Ford Coyote 5.4 L V8 | DAY | SEB | LGA; 10 | DET; 14 | WGL | MOS; 12 | ELK; Ret | VIR; 5 | IMS | PET | 25th | 1116 |
| 2026 | Myers Riley Motorsports | GTD | Ford Mustang GT3 | Ford Coyote 5.4 L V8 | DAY; 19 | SEB; 11 | LBH | LGA | WGL; 14 | MOS | ELK; 19 | VIR | IMS | PET; 14 | 42nd | 836 |

* Season still in progress.
