= 2022 TC America Series =

Racing series

The 2022 TC America Series Powered by Skip Barber Racing School is the fourth season of the TC America Series. The season began on April 15 at Sonoma Raceway and is scheduled to end on October 9 at Indianapolis Motor Speedway.

== Calendar ==
The preliminary calendar was released on September 4, 2021, without disclosing the location of round 2. On October 10, 2021, the SRO announced that Ozarks International Raceway would fill the vacancy in the schedule, pending FIA circuit homologation. The round at Virginia International Raceway was also postponed one week to avoid a clash with the 2022 24 Hours of Le Mans. On April 27, 2022, the SRO announced that Ozarks round was replaced with NOLA Motorsports Park on the same date due to the challenges related with infrastructure and supply chain.

Round	Circuit	Date
1	(United States) Sonoma Raceway, Sonoma, California	April 15–17
2	(United States) NOLA Motorsports Park, Avondale, Louisiana	May 20–22
3	(United States) Virginia International Raceway, Alton, Virginia	June 17–19
4	(United States) Watkins Glen International, Watkins Glen, New York	July 22–24
5	(United States) Road America, Elkhart Lake, Wisconsin	August 19–21
6	(United States) Sebring International Raceway, Sebring, Florida	September 23–25
7	(United States) Indianapolis Motor Speedway, Indianapolis, Indiana	October 7–9

== Entry list ==
Team	Car	No.	Drivers	Rounds
TCX entries
(United States) Fast Track Racing	BMW M2 CS Racing	1	(United States) Jacob Ruud	1–4
(United States) Fast Track Racing	BMW M2 CS Racing	29	(United States) Olivia Askew	1–4
(United States) Fast Track Racing	BMW M2 CS Racing	54	(United States) Garrett Adams	1–4
(United States) Fast Track Racing	BMW M2 CS Racing	76	(United States) Mark Wilgus	1, 3
(United States) Rigid Speed	BMW M2 CS Racing	24	(United States) Joseph Catania	1–4
(United States) Rigid Speed	BMW M2 CS Racing	26	(United States) Lucas Catania	1–4
(United States) HARD Motorsport	BMW M2 CS Racing	30	(United States) Steve Streimer	1–4
(United States) Rooster Hall Racing	BMW M2 CS Racing	44	(United States) Colin Garrett	1–4
(United States) Homewrecker Racing LLC	BMW M2 CS Racing	51	(United States) Brett Scroggin	3–4
(United States) Accelerating Performance	BMW M2 CS Racing	57	(United States) Stephen Cugliari	1–4
(United States) Random Vandals Racing	BMW M2 CS Racing	97	(United States) Jessica Tracy	3–4
TC entries
(United States) DRS & Garagistic	BMW M240i Racing	06	(United States) Matthew Ibrahim	1–4
(United States) DRS & Garagistic	BMW M240i Racing	09	(United States) Kris Valdez	1–4
(Puerto Rico) VGRT Racing Team	Honda Civic Type R TC	8	(Puerto Rico) Ruben Iglesias	1
(United States) Skip Barber Racing School	Honda Civic Type R TC	9	(United States) Kevin Boehm	1–4
(United States) Skip Barber Racing School	Honda Civic Type R TC	42	(United States) Ken Fukuda	1–4
(United States) TechSport Racing	Nissan 370Z TC	18	(United States) Jason Weaver	3
(United States) LA Honda World Racing	Honda Civic Type R TC	37	(United States) Mat Pombo	1–4
(United States) LA Honda World Racing	Honda Civic Type R TC	73	(United States) Mike LaMarra	1–4
(United States) MINI JCW Team	Mini Cooper JCW Pro TC	60	(United States) Clay Williams	1–4
(United States) FTG Racing	Mazda3 TC	70	(United States) Joey Jordan	1, 3
(United States) GenRacer / Ricca Autosport	Hyundai Veloster N TC	78	(United States) Jeff Ricca	1–4
(United States) GenRacer / Ricca Autosport	Hyundai Veloster N TC	88	(United States) Nicholas Barbato	1–4
TCA entries
(United States) Skip Barber Racing School	Honda Civic Si	2	(United States) Colin Harrison	1–4
(United States) Skip Barber Racing School	Honda Civic Si	16	(United States) Carter Fartuch	1–4
(United States) Skip Barber Racing School	Honda Civic Si	20	(United States) Mike Ogren	3
(United States) LA Honda World Racing	Honda Civic Si	5	(United States) Spencer Bucknum	1–4
(United States) LA Honda World Racing	Honda Civic Si	77	(United States) Mario Biundo	1–4
(United States) TechSport Racing	Subaru BRZ TCA	21	(United States) Gresham Wagner	1–4
(United States) TechSport Racing	Subaru BRZ TCA	22	(United States) Devin Anderson	1–4
(United States) TechSport Racing	Subaru BRZ TCA	23	(China) Shaoyi Che	1–4
(United States) Bryan Herta Autosport w/ Curb-Agajanian	Hyundai Elantra N-Line	33	(United States) Tyler Delgado	1–4
(United States) Bryan Herta Autosport w/ Curb-Agajanian	Hyundai Elantra N-Line	98	(United States) Branyon Tiner	1–4
(United States) MINI JCW Team	Mini Cooper JCW	61	(United States) Cristian Perocarpi	1–4
(United States) MINI JCW Team	Mini Cooper JCW	62	(Canada) P.J. Groenke	1–4
(Puerto Rico) VGRT Racing Team	Honda Civic Si	780	(United States) Sally McNulty	1–4

== Race results ==
**Bold** indicates overall winner

Round		Circuit	Pole position	TCX Winners	TC Winners	TCA Winners
1	R1	(United States) Sonoma	(United States) #30 HARD Motorsport	(United States) #1 Fast Track Racing	(United States) #9 Skip Barber Racing School	(United States) #16 Skip Barber Racing School
1	R1	(United States) Sonoma	(United States) Steve Streimer	(United States) Jacob Ruud	(United States) Kevin Boehm	(United States) Carter Fartuch
1	R2	(United States) Sonoma		(United States) #1 Fast Track Racing	(United States) #9 Skip Barber Racing School	(United States) #21 TechSport Racing
1	R2	(United States) Sonoma		(United States) Jacob Ruud	(United States) Kevin Boehm	(United States) Gresham Wagner
2	R1	(United States) NOLA	(United States) #57 Accelerating Performance	(United States) #44 Rooster Hall Racing	(United States) #9 Skip Barber Racing School	(United States) #16 Skip Barber Racing School
2	R1	(United States) NOLA	(United States) Stephen Cugliari	(United States) Colin Garrett	(United States) Kevin Boehm	(United States) Carter Fartuch
2	R2	(United States) NOLA		(United States) #1 Fast Track Racing	(United States) #60 Mini JCW Team	(United States) #21 TechSport Racing
2	R2	(United States) NOLA		(United States) Jacob Ruud	(United States) Clay Williams	(United States) Gresham Wagner
3	R1	(United States) Virginia	(United States) #44 Rooster Hall Racing	(United States) #44 Rooster Hall Racing	(United States) #9 Skip Barber Racing School	(United States) #21 TechSport Racing
3	R1	(United States) Virginia	(United States) Colin Garrett	(United States) Colin Garrett	(United States) Kevin Boehm	(United States) Gresham Wagner
3	R2	(United States) Virginia		(United States) #1 Fast Track Racing	(United States) #9 Skip Barber Racing School	(United States) #16 Skip Barber Racing School
3	R2	(United States) Virginia		(United States) Jacob Ruud	(United States) Kevin Boehm	(United States) Carter Fartuch
4	R1	(United States) Watkins Glen	(United States) #1 Fast Track Racing	(United States) #44 Rooster Hall Racing	(United States) #60 MINI JCW Team	(United States) #61 MINI JCW Team
4	R1	(United States) Watkins Glen	(United States) Jacob Ruud	(United States) Colin Garrett	(United States) Clay Williams	(United States) Cristian Perocarpi
4	R2	(United States) Watkins Glen		(United States) #1 Fast Track Racing	(United States) #9 Skip Barber Racing School	(United States) #21 TechSport Racing
4	R2	(United States) Watkins Glen		(United States) Jacob Ruud	(United States) Kevin Boehm	(United States) Gresham Wagner
5	R1	(United States) Road America	(United States) #97 Random Vandals Racing	(United States) #1 Fast Track Racing	(United States) #60 MINI JCW Team	(United States) #61 MINI JCW Team
5	R1	(United States) Road America	(United States) Michael Kanisczak	(United States) Jacob Ruud	(United States) Clay Williams	(United States) Cristian Perocarpi
5	R2	(United States) Road America		(United States) #1 Fast Track Racing	(United States) #60 MINI JCW Team	(United States) #61 MINI JCW Team
5	R2	(United States) Road America		(United States) Jacob Ruud	(United States) Clay Williams	(United States) Cristian Perocarpi
6	R1	(United States) Sebring				
6	R2	(United States) Sebring				
7	R1	(United States) Indianapolis				
7	R2	(United States) Indianapolis				

== Championship standings ==
Scoring system

Championship points are awarded for the first ten positions in each race. Entries are required to complete 75% of the winning car's race distance in order to be classified and earn points.

Position	**1st**	**2nd**	**3rd**	**4th**	**5th**	**6th**	**7th**	**8th**	**9th**	**10th**
Points	25	18	15	12	10	8	6	4	2	1

=== Drivers' championship ===
Pos.	Driver	Team	SON (United States)		NOL (United States)		VIR (United States)		WGL (United States)		ELK (United States)		SEB (United States)		IMS (United States)		Points
Pos.	Driver	Team	RD1	RD2	RD1	RD2	RD1	RD2	RD1	RD2	RD1	RD2	RD1	RD2	RD1	RD2	Points
TCX
1	(United States) Jacob Ruud	(United States) Fast Track Racing	1	1	2	1											93
2	(United States) Lucas Catania	(United States) Rigid Speed	3	2	3	3											63
3	(United States) Colin Garrett	(United States) Rooster Hall Racing	5	6	1	2											61
4	(United States) Stephen Cugliari	(United States) Accelerating Performance	2	3	**4**	4											57
5	(United States) Steve Streimer	(United States) HARD Motorsport	**4**	4	5	7											40
6	(United States) Garrett Adams	(United States) Fast Track Racing	7	5	6	5											34
7	(United States) Joseph Catania	(United States) Rigid Speed	14	14	8	6											18
8	(United States) Mark Wilgus	(United States) Fast Track Racing	6	7													14
9	(United States) Olivia Askew	(United States) Fast Track Racing	16	11	7	Ret											12
TC
1	(United States) Kevin Boehm	(United States) Skip Barber Racing School	8	8	**9**	10											90
2	(United States) Mat Pombo	(United States) LA Honda World Racing	9	10	10	11											63
3	(United States) Clay Williams	(United States) MINI JCW Team	10	9	Ret	8											58
4	(United States) Jeff Ricca	(United States) GenRacer / Ricca Autosport	27†	12	26†	9											38
5	(United States) Mike LaMarra	(United States) LA Honda World Racing	12	17	12	13											34
6	(United States) Matthew Ibrahim	(United States) DRS & Garagistic	15	18	11	12											33
7	(Puerto Rico) Ruben Iglesias	(Puerto Rico) VGRT Racing Team	28†	16	13	14											23
8	(United States) Nicholas Barbato	(United States) GenRacer / Ricca Autosport	13	13	Ret	15											22
9	(United States) Ken Fukuda	(United States) Skip Barber Racing School	11	15	Ret	DNS											20
10	(United States) Kris Valdez	(United States) DRS & Garagistic	20	20	14	16											14
11	(United States) Joey Jordan	(United States) FTG Racing	Ret	19													1
TCA
1	(United States) Carter Fartuch	(United States) Skip Barber Racing School	17	22	15	19											83
2	(United States) Gresham Wagner	(United States) TechSport Racing	18	21	**24†**	17											69
3	(United States) Spencer Bucknum	(United States) LA Honda World Racing	19	23	17	20											57
4	(United States) Devin Anderson	(United States) TechSport Racing	Ret	24	16	18											48
5	(United States) Sally McNulty	(Puerto Rico) VGRT Racing Team	22	25	23	23											28
6	(Canada) P.J. Groenke	(United States) MINI JCW Team	23	29	21	21											26
7	(United States) Branyon Tiner	(United States) Bryan Herta Autosport w/ Curb-Agajanian	26†	27	19	22											26
8	(United States) Cristian Perocarpi	(United States) MINI JCW Team	21	30	18	Ret											25
9	(China) Shaoyi Che	(United States) TechSport Racing	25	26	Ret	27†											12
10	(United States) Tyler Delgado	(United States) Bryan Herta Autosport w/ Curb-Agajanian	Ret	DNS	20	24											12
11	(United States) Colin Harrison	(United States) Skip Barber Racing School	24	28	25†	25											12
12	(United States) Mario Biundo	(United States) LA Honda World Racing	Ret	DNS	22	26											5
Pos.	Driver	Team	SON (United States)		NOL (United States)		VIR (United States)		WGL (United States)		ELK (United States)		SEB (United States)		IMS (United States)		Points

Key
Colour	Result
Gold	Race winner
Silver	2nd place
Bronze	3rd place
Green	Points finish
Blue	Non-points finish
Blue	Non-classified finish (NC)
Purple	Did not finish (Ret)
Black	Disqualified (DSQ)
Black	Excluded (EX)
White	Did not start (DNS)
White	Race cancelled (C)
White	Withdrew (WD)
Blank	Did not participate

**Bold** – Pole
Italics – Fastest Lap
