= Luca Mars =

American racing driver (born 2006)

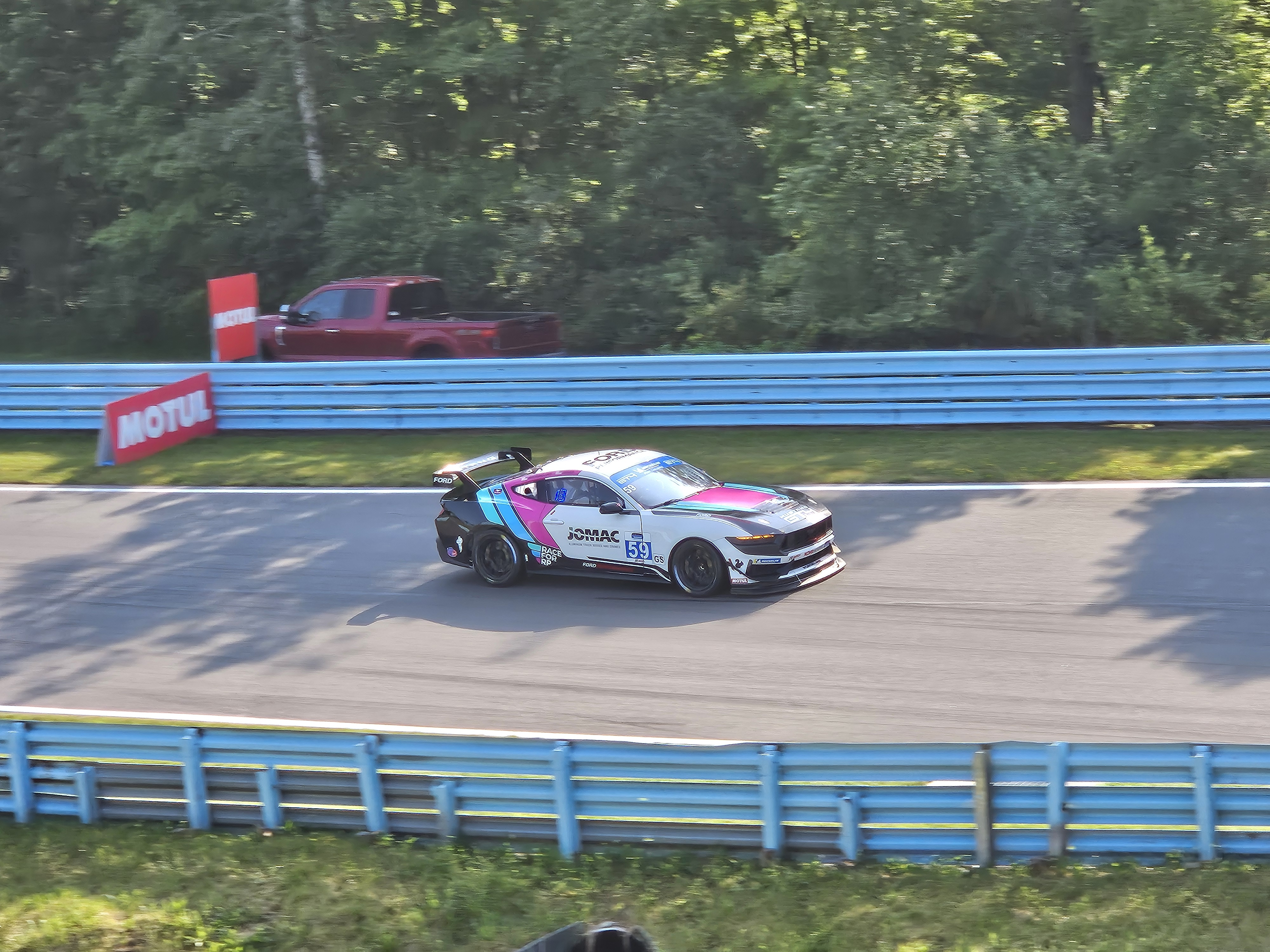
- Mars at Watkins Glen in 2024
- Nationality: (United States) American
- Born: March 7, 2006 (age 20) Pittsburgh, Pennsylvania, U.S.

Michelin Pilot Challenge career
- Debut season: 2022
- Current team: RennSport1
- Categorisation: FIA Silver
- Car number: 28
- Former teams: KohR Motorsports, Van der Steur Racing
- Starts: 29 (30 entries)
- Wins: 0
- Podiums: 4
- Poles: 1
- Fastest laps: 0
- Best finish: 14th in 2024

Previous series
- 2023–24 2023 2023 2022 2021 2020: IMSA VP Racing SportsCar Challenge; GT4 America Series; IMSA SportsCar Championship; Trans-Am Series; Mazda MX-5 Cup; F2000 Championship Series

Championship titles
- 2024: IMSA VP Racing SportsCar Challenge

Luca Mars (born March 7, 2006) is an American racing driver who competes in the 2025 Michelin Pilot Challenge for RennSport1. He previously competed in the 2024 GT World Challenge America driving for Racers Edge Motorsports. He is the 2024 IMSA VP Racing SportsCar Challenge GSX champion.

== Career ==
=== Mazda MX-5 Cup ===
In 2021, Mars joined the 2021 Mazda MX-5 Cup driving for Copeland Motorsports. He would have a best finish of third at Mid-Ohio and finished sixth in the championship.

=== Michelin Pilot Challenge ===
==== 2022 ====
In 2022, Mars would move over to sportscar racing to compete in the 2022 Michelin Pilot Challenge driving the No. 60 Ford Mustang GT4 for KohR Motorsports. He would be joined by Nate Stacy to drive the car. For the final two races of the season at Virginia International Raceway and Road Atlanta, Mars would join teammates Billy Johnson and Bob Michaelian in the No. 59 Ford Mustang GT4. Mars finished the final race at Road Atlanta on the podium in third alongside Johnson and Michealian.

==== 2023 ====
On January 4, 2023, it was announced that Mars would return to the series to compete in the 2023 Michelin Pilot Challenge driving the No. 59 Ford Mustang GT4 for KohR Motorsports. He would be joined by Bob Michaelian as his teammate. Midway through the season, Mars joined Van der Steur Racing to compete in the TCR only event at Lime Rock Park, where he finished fifth.

==== 2024 ====
Mars returned to the series for a third season once again driving the newest Ford Mustang GT4 alongside Bob Michaelian. He and Michaelian would have a season best finish of third at Virginia International Raceway and the pair finished 14th in the championship.

=== IMSA VP Racing SportsCar Challenge ===
==== 2023 ====
Alongside his Michelin Pilot Challenge campaign, Mars would enter the Sebring races in the 2023 IMSA VP Racing SportsCar Challenge in the No. 59 Ford Mustang GT4 for KohR Motorsports. He would have mixed fortunes with a win on his debut in race one, but retiring the following race.

==== 2024 ====
In 2024, Mars returned to the series for a full season campaign once again driving the No. 59 Ford Mustang GT4 for KohR Motorsports. He would go on to have his most successful season with six wins, four poles, and nine podiums to clinch the championship before race 12 at Road Atlanta.

== Racing record ==
=== Career summary ===
Season	Series	Team	Races	Wins	Poles	F/Laps	Podiums	Points	Position
2020	F2000 Championship Series	John Walko Racing	4	0	0	0	3	143	7th
2021	Mazda MX-5 Cup	Copeland Motorsports	14	0	0	0	1	3210	6th
2022	Trans-Am Series	Race for RP	1	1	0	1	1	29	12th
2022	Michelin Pilot Challenge - GS	KohR Motorsports	8	0	1	0	1	1530	17th
2023	Michelin Pilot Challenge - GS	KohR Motorsports	9	0	0	1	1	1730	16th
2023	IMSA VP Racing SportsCar Challenge - GSX	KohR Motorsports	2	1	0	1	1	480	25th
2023	IMSA SportsCar Championship - LMP3	JDC–Miller MotorSports	1	0	0	0	0	8	42nd
2023	GT4 America Series	JTR Motorsports Engineering	2	0	0	0	0	4	21st
2023	Michelin Pilot Challenge - TCR	Van der Steur Racing	1	0	0	0	0	260	28th
2024	IMSA VP Racing SportsCar Challenge - GSX	KohR Motorsports	11	6	4	4	9	3210	**1st**
2024	Michelin Pilot Challenge - GS	KohR Motorsports	10	0	0	0	1	1920	14th
2024	GT World Challenge America - Pro	Racers Edge Motorsports	13	0	8	0	1	192	**3rd**
2025	Michelin Pilot Challenge - GS	RennSport1	10	3	3	3	6	2720	**1st**
2025	GT4 America Series - Silver	van der Steur Racing	4	0	0	0	1	36	9th
2026	Michelin Pilot Challenge - GS	Turner Motorsport	10	1	1	1	4	2440	**2nd**
2026	GT4 America Series - Silver	RS1	13	7	2	7	8	259	**1st**

* Season still in progress.

=== Complete Mazda MX-5 Cup results ===
(key) (Races in bold indicate pole position) (Races in italics indicate fastest lap)

Year	Entrant	1	2	3	4	5	6	7	8	9	10	11	12	13	14	Rank	Points
2021	Copeland Motorsports	DAY; 1; 13	DAY; 2; 9	SEB; 1; 26	SEB; 2; 7	STP; 1; 5	STP; 2; 4	MOH; 1; 7	MOH; 2; 3	ROA; 1; 12	ROA; 2; 8	LGA; 1; 9	LGA; 2; 4	ATL; 1; 7	ATL; 2; 4	6th	3210

=== Complete IMSA VP Racing SportsCar Challenge results ===
(key) (Races in bold indicate pole position; races in italics indicate fastest lap)

Year	Entrant	Class	Make	Engine	1	2	3	4	5	6	7	8	9	10	11	12	Rank	Points
2023	KohR Motorsports	GSX	Ford Mustang GT4	Ford 5.2 L Voodoo V8	DAY; 1	DAY; 2	SEB; 1; 1	SEB; 2; 18	MOS; 1	MOS; 2	LIM; 1	LIM; 2	VIR; 1	VIR; 2	ATL; 1	ATL; 2	25th	480
2024	KohR Motorsports	GSX	Ford Mustang GT4	Ford 5.0 L Coyote V8	DAY; 1; 1	**DAY**; **2**; 1	STP; 1; 3	STP; 2; 4	MOH; 1; 1	MOH; 2; 3	MOS; 1; 2	MOS; 2; 5	**VIR**; **1**; 1	**VIR**; **2**; 1	ATL; 1; 1	ATL; 2 DNS	1st	3560

=== Complete Michelin Pilot Challenge results ===
(key) (Races in bold indicate pole position) (Races in italics indicate fastest lap)

Year	Entrant	Class	Make	Engine	1	2	3	4	5	6	7	8	9	10	Rank	Points
2022	KohR Motorsports	Grand Sport	Ford Mustang GT4	Ford 5.2 L Voodoo V8	DAY	SEB; 13	LGA; 12	MOH; 4	WGL; 8	MOS	LIM; 17	**ELK**; 19	VIR; 22†	ATL; 3	17th	1530
2023	KohR Motorsports	Grand Sport	Ford Mustang GT4	Ford 5.2 L Voodoo V8	DAY; 23	SEB; 17	LGA; 20	DET; 16	WGL; DNS	MOS; 13	ELK; 2	VIR; 5	IMS; 10	ATL; 4	16th	1730
2023	Van der Steur Racing	Touring Car	Hyundai Veloster N TCR	Hyundai 2.0 L Turbo I-4	DAY	SEB	LGA	WGL	MOS	LIM; 5	ELK	VIR	IMS	ATL	28th	260
2024	KohR Motorsports	Grand Sport	Ford Mustang GT4	Ford 5.0 L Coyote V8	DAY; 8	SEB; 23	LGA; 14	MOH; 8	WGL; 19	MOS; 11	ELK; 4	VIR; 3	IMS; 12	ATL; 19	14th	1920
2025	RennSport1	Grand Sport	Porsche 718 Cayman GT4 RS Clubsport	Porsche MDG 4.0 L Flat-6	**DAY**; 2	SEB; 2	LGA; 1	MOH; 3	WGL; 1	MOS; 9	ELK; 17	VIR; 1	IMS; 19	ATL; 6	1st	2720

† Mars received a post-race penalty and was moved to the back of his class

* Season still in progress.
