= 2023 Toyota GR Cup North America =

Motor racing competition

The 2023 Toyota GR Cup North America was the inaugural season of the Toyota GR Cup North America. The series began on March 30 at Sonoma Raceway, and concluded on October 8 at Indianapolis Motor Speedway after 14 rounds.

== Schedule ==
The schedule was announced on August 23, 2022, featuring 14 rounds across seven double-header weekends. After the second race at Nashville was cancelled due to inclement weather, a make-up race was announced at Indianapolis.

Round	Circuit	Date	Supporting
1	(California) Sonoma Raceway	March 30 – April 2	GT World Challenge America
2	(Texas) Circuit of the Americas	May 5–7	GT World Challenge America
3	Virginia International Raceway	June 16–18	GT World Challenge America
4	(Tennessee) Nashville Street Circuit	August 4–6	IndyCar Series; GT World Challenge America
5	(Wisconsin) Road America	August 25–28	GT World Challenge America
6	(Florida) Sebring International Raceway	September 25–27	GT World Challenge America
7	(Indiana) Indianapolis Motor Speedway	October 6–8	Intercontinental GT Challenge; GT World Challenge America

== Entry list ==
All competitors utilize the Toyota GR86 Cup car.

Team	No.	Driver	Rounds
Precision Racing LA	09	(United States) Cat Lauren	1–2
Precision Racing LA	2	(United States) Jaxon Bell	4–7
Precision Racing LA	37	(United States) Spencer Schmidt	3–7
Precision Racing LA	37	(United States) Harry Cheung	1
Precision Racing LA	73	(United States) Aidan Yoder	1–2, 4–7
TechSport Racing	5	(United States) Gresham Wagner	All
TechSport Racing	55	(United States) Spike Kohlbecker	All
Godwin Motorsports	6	(United States) Will Rodgers	All
Zotz Racing	7	(United States) Michael Garcia	1–2, 6–7
Zotz Racing	30	(United States) Alex Garcia	1–4, 6–7
Smooge Racing	8	(United States) Will Robusto	3–7
Smooge Racing	8	(United States) Isabella Robusto	1–2
Smooge Racing	66	(United States) Bailey Monette	1–2
Smooge Racing	66	(United States) Jaxon Bell	3
Smooge Racing	66	(United States) John Geesbreght	7
Smooge Racing	67	(United States) Joey DaSilva	All
Smooge Racing	68	(United States) Mia Lovell	All
PJM / VGRT	10	(United States) Mark Pombo	All
PJM / VGRT	44	(United States) Derek Jones	All
VGRT	88	(United States) Ruben Iglesias Jr.	1–2, 4, 6–7
VGRT	98	(United States) Canaan O'Connell	1–2, 4–7
RVA Graphics Motorsports by Speed Syndicate	11	(United States) Farran Davis	1–4, 6–7
RVA Graphics Motorsports by Speed Syndicate	11	(United States) Jack Woodfin	5
RVA Graphics Motorsports by Speed Syndicate	31	(United States) Austin Dodge	All
BSI Racing	18	(United States) Jordan Segrini	3–7
BSI Racing	76	(United States) Steven Clemons	1–2, 4–5, 7
Tommy McCarthy Racing	23	(United States) Tommy McCarthy	All
Nitro Motorsports	24	(United States) Brent Crews	3–4
Nitro Motorsports	24	(United States) Corey Heim	5–6
Nitro Motorsports	24	(United States) William Sawalich	1
Nitro Motorsports	24	(United States) Jesse Love Jr.	2
Nitro Motorsports	24	(United States) Giovanni Ruggiero	7
Nitro Motorsports	70	(United States) Toni Breidinger	All
Nitro Motorsports	80	(United States) Tyler Wettengel	1–2, 4–7
McCumbee McAleer Racing	27	(United States) Lev Uretsky	1–4, 6–7
McCumbee McAleer Racing	28	(United States) Justin Piscitelli	All
Lucas Racing	46	(United States) Lucas Weisenberg	All
Copeland Motorsports	57	(United States) Tyler Gonzalez	All
Copeland Motorsports	71	(United States) Paul Bocuse	All
Copeland Motorsports	99	(United States) Drake Kemper	1–2, 4–7
Pura Vida Team	58	(Costa Rica) Amadéo Quiros Martén	1–6
Skip Barber Racing School	61	(United States) James Klimas	7
OpenRoad Racing	69	(Canada) Adam Isman	1–4, 6–7
OpenRoad Racing	69	(Canada) Kevin Foster	5
Eagles Canyon Racing	86	(United States) Andrew Gilleland	2, 5

== Race results ==
Round		Circuit	Pole position	Fastest lap	Winning driver
1	R1	Sonoma Raceway	#57 Copeland Motorsports	#55 TechSport Racing	#57 Copeland Motorsports
1	R1	Sonoma Raceway	(United States) Tyler Gonzalez	(United States) Spike Kohlbecker	(United States) Tyler Gonzalez
1	R2	Sonoma Raceway	#5 TechSport Racing	#5 TechSport Racing	#57 Copeland Motorsports
1	R2	Sonoma Raceway	(United States) Gresham Wagner	(United States) Gresham Wagner	(United States) Tyler Gonzalez
2	R1	Circuit of the Americas	#99 Copeland Motorsports	#5 TechSport Racing	#5 TechSport Racing
2	R1	Circuit of the Americas	(United States) Drake Kemper	(United States) Gresham Wagner	(United States) Gresham Wagner
2	R2	Circuit of the Americas	#73 Precision Racing LA	#28 McCumbee McAleer Racing	#55 TechSport Racing
2	R2	Circuit of the Americas	(United States) Aidan Yoder	(United States) Justin Piscitelli	(United States) Spike Kohlbecker
3	R1	Virginia International Raceway	#5 TechSport Racing	#46 Lucas Racing	#46 Lucas Racing
3	R1	Virginia International Raceway	(United States) Gresham Wagner	(United States) Lucas Weisenberg	(United States) Lucas Weisenberg
3	R2	Virginia International Raceway	#57 Copeland Motorsports	#57 Copeland Motorsports	#57 Copeland Motorsports
3	R2	Virginia International Raceway	(United States) Tyler Gonzalez	(United States) Tyler Gonzalez	(United States) Tyler Gonzalez
4	R1	Nashville Street Circuit	#57 Copeland Motorsports	#57 Copeland Motorsports	#57 Copeland Motorsports
4	R1	Nashville Street Circuit	(United States) Tyler Gonzalez	(United States) Tyler Gonzalez	(United States) Tyler Gonzalez
4	R2	Nashville Street Circuit	Race cancelled due to lightning and heavy rain in the area		
5	R1	Road America	#57 Copeland Motorsports	#57 Copeland Motorsports	#57 Copeland Motorsports
5	R1	Road America	(United States) Tyler Gonzalez	(United States) Tyler Gonzalez	(United States) Tyler Gonzalez
5	R2	Road America	#6 Godwin Motorsports	#57 Copeland Motorsports	#5 TechSport Racing
5	R2	Road America	(United States) Will Rodgers	(United States) Tyler Gonzalez	(United States) Gresham Wagner
6	R1	Sebring International Raceway	#57 Copeland Motorsports	#57 Copeland Motorsports	#57 Copeland Motorsports
6	R1	Sebring International Raceway	(United States) Tyler Gonzalez	(United States) Tyler Gonzalez	(United States) Tyler Gonzalez
6	R2	Sebring International Raceway	#5 TechSport Racing	#5 TechSport Racing	#57 Copeland Motorsports
6	R2	Sebring International Raceway	(United States) Gresham Wagner	(United States) Gresham Wagner	(United States) Tyler Gonzalez
7	R1	Indianapolis Motor Speedway	#57 Copeland Motorsports	#5 TechSport Racing	#55 TechSport Racing
7	R1	Indianapolis Motor Speedway	(United States) Tyler Gonzalez	(United States) Gresham Wagner	(United States) Spike Kohlbecker
7	R2	Indianapolis Motor Speedway	#71 Copeland Motorsports	#55 TechSport Racing	#5 TechSport Racing
7	R2	Indianapolis Motor Speedway	(United States) Paul Bocuse	(United States) Spike Kohlbecker	(United States) Gresham Wagner
7	R3	Indianapolis Motor Speedway	#5 TechSport Racing	#18 BSI Racing	#55 TechSport Racing
7	R3	Indianapolis Motor Speedway	(United States) Gresham Wagner	(United States) Jordan Segrini	(United States) Spike Kohlbecker
