= 2025 Monterey SportsCar Championship =

Fourth round of the 2025 IMSA SportsCar Championship season

The layout of WeatherTech Raceway Laguna Seca, where the race was held

The 2025 Monterey SportsCar Championship (formally known as the 2025 TireRack.com Monterey SportsCar Championship) was a sports car race, held at WeatherTech Raceway Laguna Seca near Monterey, California, on May 11, 2025. It was the fourth round of the 2025 IMSA SportsCar Championship.

== Background ==
=== Preview ===
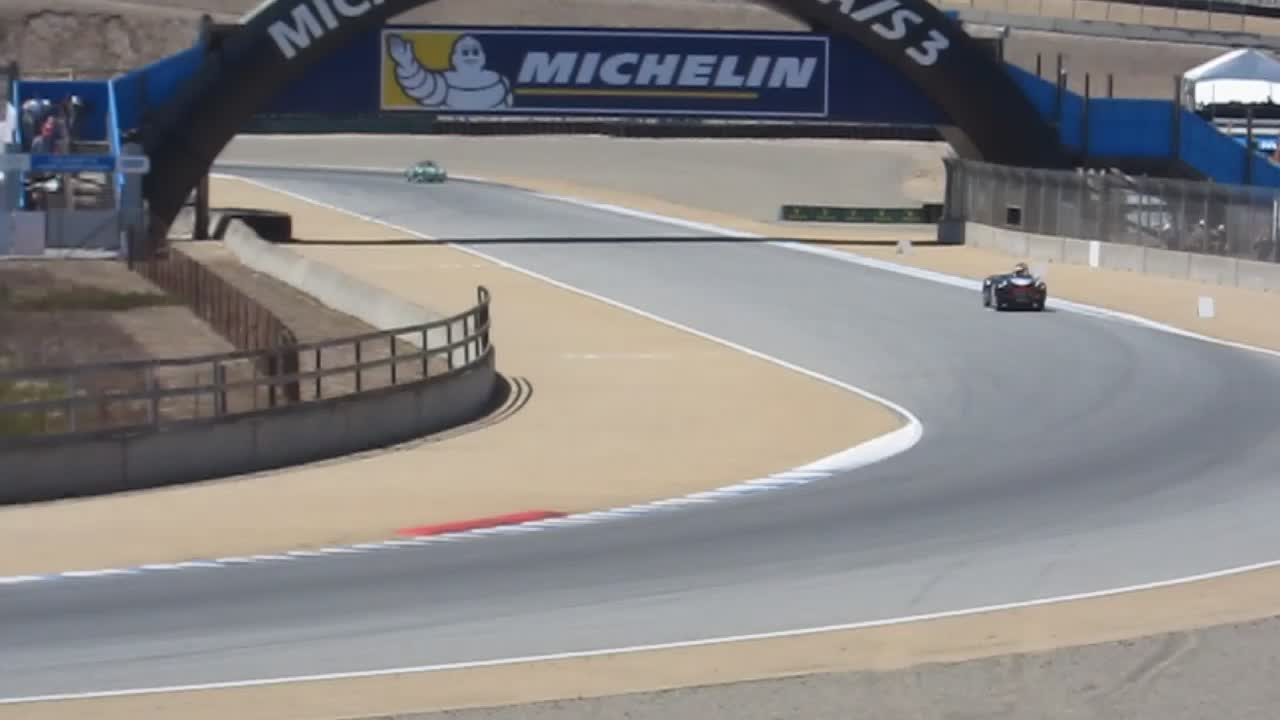
WeatherTech Raceway Laguna Seca, where the race was held

International Motor Sports Association (IMSA) president John Doonan confirmed the race was part of the schedule of the 2025 IMSA SportsCar Championship (IMSA SCC) in March 2024. It was the twelfth consecutive year the race is a part of the IMSA SCC. The 2025 Monterey SportsCar Championship was the fourth of eleventh scheduled sports car races of 2025 by IMSA. The race was held at the eleven-turn 2.238 mi (3.602 km) WeatherTech Raceway Laguna Seca on May 11, 2025.

=== Standings before the race ===
Preceding the event, Felipe Nasr and Nick Tandy led the GTP Drivers' Championship with 1140 points after winning the opening three events, with Porsche team-mates Matt Campbell and Mathieu Jaminet in second, 123 points behind. Philipp Eng and Dries Vanthoor sat in third place, 265 points behind Nasr and Tandy. The GTD Pro Drivers' Championship was led by Christopher Mies, Dennis Olsen, and Frédéric Vervisch with 653 points, 17 points ahead of Klaus Bachler, Laurin Heinrich, and Alessio Picariello. Connor De Phillippi, Madison Snow, and Neil Verhagen were third, 25 points behind Mies, Olsen, and Vervisch. In the GTD Drivers' Championship, Philip Ellis and Russell Ward led with 994 points, 91 points ahead of second-placed Jack Hawksworth and Parker Thompson. Tom Gamble and Casper Stevenson rounded out the top three, 95 points behind Ellis and Ward. The Teams' Championships were led by Porsche Penske Motorsport, Ford Multimatic Motorsports, and Winward Racing, respectively, with Porsche leading the GTP and GTD Manufacturers' Championships, and Ford leading the GTP Pro Manufacturers' Championship.

== Entry list ==
The entry list was published on April 30, 2025, and featured 36 entries: 11 in GTP, 10 in GTD Pro, and 15 in GTD.

No.	Entrant	Car	Driver 1	Driver 2
GTP (Grand Touring Prototype) (11 entries)
6	(Germany) Porsche Penske Motorsport	Porsche 963	(Australia) Matt Campbell	(France) Mathieu Jaminet
7	(Germany) Porsche Penske Motorsport	Porsche 963	(Brazil) Felipe Nasr	(United Kingdom) Nick Tandy
10	(United States) Cadillac Wayne Taylor Racing	Cadillac V-Series.R	(Portugal) Filipe Albuquerque	(United States) Ricky Taylor
23	(United States) Aston Martin THOR Team	Aston Martin Valkyrie	(Canada) Roman De Angelis	(United Kingdom) Ross Gunn
24	(United States) BMW M Team RLL	BMW M Hybrid V8	(Austria) Philipp Eng	(Belgium) Dries Vanthoor
25	(United States) BMW M Team RLL	BMW M Hybrid V8	(South Africa) Sheldon van der Linde	(Germany) Marco Wittmann
31	(United States) Cadillac Whelen	Cadillac V-Series.R	(United Kingdom) Jack Aitken	(Denmark) Frederik Vesti
40	(United States) Cadillac Wayne Taylor Racing	Cadillac V-Series.R	(Switzerland) Louis Delétraz	(United States) Jordan Taylor
60	(United States) Acura Meyer Shank Racing w/ Curb-Agajanian	Acura ARX-06	(United Kingdom) Tom Blomqvist	(United States) Colin Braun
85	(United States) JDC–Miller MotorSports	Porsche 963	(Italy) Gianmaria Bruni	(Netherlands) Tijmen van der Helm
93	(United States) Acura Meyer Shank Racing w/ Curb-Agajanian	Acura ARX-06	(United Kingdom) Nick Yelloly	(Netherlands) Renger van der Zande
GTD Pro (GT Daytona Pro) (10 entries)
1	(United States) Paul Miller Racing	BMW M4 GT3 Evo	(United States) Madison Snow	(United States) Neil Verhagen
3	(United States) Corvette Racing by Pratt Miller Motorsports	Chevrolet Corvette Z06 GT3.R	(Spain) Antonio García	(United Kingdom) Alexander Sims
4	(United States) Corvette Racing by Pratt Miller Motorsports	Chevrolet Corvette Z06 GT3.R	(Netherlands) Nicky Catsburg	(United States) Tommy Milner
9	(Canada) Pfaff Motorsports	Lamborghini Huracán GT3 Evo 2	(Italy) Andrea Caldarelli	(Italy) Marco Mapelli
14	(United States) Vasser Sullivan Racing	Lexus RC F GT3	(Germany) Marvin Kirchhöfer	(United States) Aaron Telitz
48	(United States) Paul Miller Racing	BMW M4 GT3 Evo	(United Kingdom) Dan Harper	(Germany) Max Hesse
64	(Canada) Ford Multimatic Motorsports	Ford Mustang GT3	(United Kingdom) Sebastian Priaulx	(Germany) Mike Rockenfeller
65	(Canada) Ford Multimatic Motorsports	Ford Mustang GT3	(Germany) Christopher Mies	(Belgium) Frédéric Vervisch
77	(United States) AO Racing	Porsche 911 GT3 R (992)	(Austria) Klaus Bachler	(Germany) Laurin Heinrich
81	(United States) DragonSpeed	Ferrari 296 GT3	(Italy) Giacomo Altoè	(Spain) Albert Costa
GTD (GT Daytona) (15 entries)
021	(United States) Triarsi Competizione	Ferrari 296 GT3	(United Kingdom) Stevan McAleer	(United States) Sheena Monk
023	(United States) Triarsi Competizione	Ferrari 296 GT3	(Italy) Riccardo Agostini	(United States) Onofrio Triarsi
12	(United States) Vasser Sullivan Racing	Lexus RC F GT3	(United Kingdom) Jack Hawksworth	(Canada) Parker Thompson
13	(Canada) AWA	Chevrolet Corvette Z06 GT3.R	(United Kingdom) Matt Bell	(Canada) Orey Fidani
27	(United States) Heart of Racing Team	Aston Martin Vantage AMR GT3 Evo	(United Kingdom) Casper Stevenson	(United Kingdom) Darren Turner
32	(United States) Korthoff Competition Motors	Mercedes-AMG GT3 Evo	(United States) Kenton Koch	(United States) Seth Lucas
34	(United States) Conquest Racing	Ferrari 296 GT3	(United States) Manny Franco	(Brazil) Daniel Serra
36	(United States) DXDT Racing	Chevrolet Corvette Z06 GT3.R	(United States) Alec Udell	(Canada) Robert Wickens
45	(United States) Wayne Taylor Racing	Lamborghini Huracán GT3 Evo 2	(Costa Rica) Danny Formal	(United States) Trent Hindman
57	(United States) Winward Racing	Mercedes-AMG GT3 Evo	(Switzerland) Philip Ellis	(United States) Russell Ward
66	(United States) Gradient Racing	Ford Mustang GT3	(United States) Jenson Altzman	(United States) Robert Megennis
70	(United Kingdom) Inception Racing	Ferrari 296 GT3	(United States) Brendan Iribe	(Denmark) Frederik Schandorff
78	(United States) Forte Racing	Lamborghini Huracán GT3 Evo 2	(Germany) Mario Farnbacher	(Canada) Misha Goikhberg
96	(United States) Turner Motorsport	BMW M4 GT3 Evo	(United States) Robby Foley	(United States) Patrick Gallagher
120	(United States) Wright Motorsports	Porsche 911 GT3 R (992)	(United States) Adam Adelson	(United States) Elliott Skeer

== Practice ==
There were two practice sessions preceding the start of the race on Sunday, one on Friday afternoon and one on Saturday morning. The first session lasted 90 minutes on Friday afternoon while the second session on Saturday morning lasted 90 minutes.

== Qualifying ==
Saturday's afternoon qualifying was broken into three sessions, with one session for the GTP, GTD Pro, and GTD classes each. The rules dictated that all teams nominated a driver to qualify their cars. The competitors' fastest lap times determined the starting order. IMSA then arranged the grid to put GTPs ahead of the GTD Pro and GTD cars.

=== Qualifying results ===
Pole positions in each class are indicated in bold and with ‡.

Pos.	Class	No.	Entry	Driver	Time	Gap	Grid
1	**GTP**	**24**	**(United States) BMW M Team RLL**	**(Belgium) Dries Vanthoor**	**1:12.854**	—	1‡
2	GTP	6	(Germany) Porsche Penske Motorsport	(Australia) Matt Campbell	1:12.859	+0.005	2
3	GTP	7	(Germany) Porsche Penske Motorsport	(United Kingdom) Nick Tandy	1:12.932	+0.078	3
4	GTP	10	(United States) Cadillac Wayne Taylor Racing	(United States) Ricky Taylor	1:13.032	+0.178	4
5	GTP	60	(United States) Acura Meyer Shank Racing w/ Curb-Agajanian	(United Kingdom) Tom Blomqvist	1:13.058	+0.204	5
6	GTP	25	(United States) BMW M Team RLL	(South Africa) Sheldon van der Linde	1:13.091	+0.237	6
7	GTP	40	(United States) Cadillac Wayne Taylor Racing	(United States) Jordan Taylor	1:13.368	+0.514	7
8	GTP	93	(United States) Acura Meyer Shank Racing w/ Curb-Agajanian	(United Kingdom) Nick Yelloly	1:13.535	+0.681	8
9	GTP	31	(United States) Cadillac Whelen	(Denmark) Frederik Vesti	1:13.544	+0.690	9
10	GTP	85	(United States) JDC–Miller MotorSports	(Italy) Gianmaria Bruni	1:13.651	+0.797	10
11	GTP	23	(United States) Aston Martin THOR Team	(Canada) Roman De Angelis	1:13.718	+0.864	11
12	**GTD Pro**	**81**	**(United States) DragonSpeed**	**(Italy) Giacomo Altoè**	**1:20.608**	**+7.754**	12‡
13	GTD Pro	48	(United States) Paul Miller Racing	(United Kingdom) Dan Harper	1:20.644	+7.790	13
14	GTD Pro	3	(United States) Corvette Racing by Pratt Miller Motorsports	(United Kingdom) Alexander Sims	1:20.673	+7.819	14
15	GTD Pro	77	(United States) AO Racing	(Austria) Klaus Bachler	1:20.765	+7.911	15
16	**GTD**	**32**	**(United States) Korthoff Competition Motors**	**(United States) Kenton Koch**	**1:20.810**	**+7.956**	22‡
17	GTD	36	(United States) DXDT Racing	(United States) Alec Udell	1:20.819	+7.965	23
18	GTD Pro	4	(United States) Corvette Racing by Pratt Miller Motorsports	(Netherlands) Nicky Catsburg	1:20.883	+8.029	16
19	GTD Pro	9	(Canada) Pfaff Motorsports	(Italy) Andrea Caldarelli	1:20.899	+8.045	17
20	GTD	023	(United States) Triarsi Competizione	(United States) Onofrio Triarsi	1:21.010	+8.156	24
21	GTD	57	(United States) Winward Racing	(United States) Russell Ward	1:21.130	+8.276	25
22	GTD	45	(United States) Wayne Taylor Racing	(Costa Rica) Danny Formal	1:21.196	+8.342	26
23	GTD Pro	65	(Canada) Ford Multimatic Motorsports	(Belgium) Frédéric Vervisch	1:21.242	+8.388	18
24	GTD Pro	14	(United States) Vasser Sullivan Racing	(United States) Aaron Telitz	1:21.291	+8.437	19
25	GTD	12	(United States) Vasser Sullivan Racing	(Canada) Parker Thompson	1:21.315	+8.461	27
26	GTD Pro	1	(United States) Paul Miller Racing	(United States) Madison Snow	1:21.316	+8.462	20
27	GTD Pro	64	(Canada) Ford Multimatic Motorsports	(Germany) Mike Rockenfeller	1:21.469	+8.615	21
28	GTD	34	(United States) Conquest Racing	(United States) Manny Franco	1:21.490	+8.636	28
29	GTD	96	(United States) Turner Motorsport	(United States) Patrick Gallagher	1:21.495	+8.641	29
30	GTD	78	(United States) Forte Racing	(Canada) Misha Goikhberg	1:21.768	+8.914	30
31	GTD	120	(United States) Wright Motorsports	(United States) Adam Adelson	1:21.918	+9.064	31
32	GTD	66	(United States) Gradient Racing	(United States) Jenson Altzman	1:22.194	+9.340	32
33	GTD	70	(United Kingdom) Inception Racing	(United States) Brendan Iribe	1:22.219	+9.365	33
34	GTD	021	(United States) Triarsi Competizione	(United States) Sheena Monk	1:23.368	+10.514	34
35	GTD	13	(Canada) AWA	(Canada) Orey Fidani	1:23.653	+10.799	35
36	GTD	27	(United States) Heart of Racing Team	(United Kingdom) Casper Stevenson	No time set (Note: The No. 27 Heart of Racing Team Aston Martin had all its lap times deleted due to failing post-qualifying technical inspection, with ground clearance below the minimum permitted by IMSA regulations.)		36

== Race ==
=== Post-race ===
The final results kept Nasr and Tandy atop GTP Drivers' Championship with 1490 points, 91 ahead of race winners Campbell and Jaminet. With 1014 points, Bachler and Heinrich's victory allowed them to take the lead of the GTD Pro Drivers' Championship. Ellis and Ward's victory allowed them to extend their advantage in the Drivers' Championship to 124 points over second-place finishers Hawksworth and Thompson in the GTD Drivers' Championship. Porsche Penske Motorsport and Winward Racing continued to top their respective Teams' Championships. Porsche continued to top the GTP Manufacturers' Championship, while Porsche and Mercedes-AMG they took the lead of their respective Manufacturers' Championship. Porsche Penske Motorsport and Winward Racing kept their respective advantages in their Teams' Championships while AO Racing became the leader of the GTD Pro Teams' Championship with 7 rounds remaining in the season.

Class winners are in bold and ‡.

Pos	Class	No	Team	Drivers	Chassis	Laps	Time/Retired
Pos	Class	No	Team	Drivers	Engine	Laps	Time/Retired
1	**GTP**	**6**	**(Germany) Porsche Penske Motorsport**	**(Australia) Matt Campbell (France) Mathieu Jaminet**	**Porsche 963**	**124**	**2:40:27.070‡**
1	**GTP**	**6**	**(Germany) Porsche Penske Motorsport**	**(Australia) Matt Campbell (France) Mathieu Jaminet**	**Porsche 9RD 4.6 L turbo V8**	**124**	**2:40:27.070‡**
2	GTP	7	(Germany) Porsche Penske Motorsport	(Brazil) Felipe Nasr (United Kingdom) Nick Tandy	Porsche 963	124	+1.692
2	GTP	7	(Germany) Porsche Penske Motorsport	(Brazil) Felipe Nasr (United Kingdom) Nick Tandy	Porsche 9RD 4.6 L turbo V8	124	+1.692
3	GTP	24	(United States) BMW M Team RLL	(Austria) Philipp Eng (Belgium) Dries Vanthoor	BMW M Hybrid V8	124	+33.408
3	GTP	24	(United States) BMW M Team RLL	(Austria) Philipp Eng (Belgium) Dries Vanthoor	BMW P66/3 4.0 L turbo V8	124	+33.408
4	GTP	25	(United States) BMW M Team RLL	(South Africa) Sheldon van der Linde (Germany) Marco Wittmann	BMW M Hybrid V8	124	+1:02.080
4	GTP	25	(United States) BMW M Team RLL	(South Africa) Sheldon van der Linde (Germany) Marco Wittmann	BMW P66/3 4.0 L turbo V8	124	+1:02.080
5	GTP	93	(United States) Acura Meyer Shank Racing w/ Curb-Agajanian	(United Kingdom) Nick Yelloly (Netherlands) Renger van der Zande	Acura ARX-06	123	+1 Lap
5	GTP	93	(United States) Acura Meyer Shank Racing w/ Curb-Agajanian	(United Kingdom) Nick Yelloly (Netherlands) Renger van der Zande	Acura AR24e 2.4 L turbo V6	123	+1 Lap
6	GTP	31	(United States) Cadillac Whelen	(United Kingdom) Jack Aitken (Denmark) Frederik Vesti	Cadillac V-Series.R	123	+1 Lap
6	GTP	31	(United States) Cadillac Whelen	(United Kingdom) Jack Aitken (Denmark) Frederik Vesti	Cadillac LMC55R 5.5 L V8	123	+1 Lap
7	GTP	40	(United States) Cadillac Wayne Taylor Racing	(Switzerland) Louis Delétraz (United States) Jordan Taylor	Cadillac V-Series.R	123	+1 Lap
7	GTP	40	(United States) Cadillac Wayne Taylor Racing	(Switzerland) Louis Delétraz (United States) Jordan Taylor	Cadillac LMC55R 5.5 L V8	123	+1 Lap
8	GTP	10	(United States) Cadillac Wayne Taylor Racing	(Portugal) Filipe Albuquerque (United States) Ricky Taylor	Cadillac V-Series.R	122	+2 Laps
8	GTP	10	(United States) Cadillac Wayne Taylor Racing	(Portugal) Filipe Albuquerque (United States) Ricky Taylor	Cadillac LMC55R 5.5 L V8	122	+2 Laps
9	GTP	85	(United States) JDC–Miller MotorSports	(Italy) Gianmaria Bruni (Netherlands) Tijmen van der Helm	Porsche 963	122	+2 Laps
9	GTP	85	(United States) JDC–Miller MotorSports	(Italy) Gianmaria Bruni (Netherlands) Tijmen van der Helm	Porsche 9RD 4.6 L turbo V8	122	+2 Laps
10	GTP	23	(United States) Aston Martin THOR Team	(Canada) Roman De Angelis (United Kingdom) Ross Gunn	Aston Martin Valkyrie	122	+2 Laps
10	GTP	23	(United States) Aston Martin THOR Team	(Canada) Roman De Angelis (United Kingdom) Ross Gunn	Aston Martin RA 6.5 L V12	122	+2 Laps
11	GTP	60	(United States) Acura Meyer Shank Racing w/ Curb-Agajanian	(United Kingdom) Tom Blomqvist (United States) Colin Braun	Acura ARX-06	121	+3 Laps
11	GTP	60	(United States) Acura Meyer Shank Racing w/ Curb-Agajanian	(United Kingdom) Tom Blomqvist (United States) Colin Braun	Acura AR24e 2.4 L turbo V6	121	+3 Laps
12	**GTD Pro**	**77**	**(United States) AO Racing**	**(Austria) Klaus Bachler (Germany) Laurin Heinrich**	**Porsche 911 GT3 R (992)**	**115**	**+9 Laps‡**
12	**GTD Pro**	**77**	**(United States) AO Racing**	**(Austria) Klaus Bachler (Germany) Laurin Heinrich**	**Porsche M97/80 4.2 L Flat-6**	**115**	**+9 Laps‡**
13	GTD Pro	81	(United States) DragonSpeed	(Italy) Giacomo Altoè (Spain) Albert Costa	Ferrari 296 GT3	115	+9 Laps
13	GTD Pro	81	(United States) DragonSpeed	(Italy) Giacomo Altoè (Spain) Albert Costa	Ferrari F163CE 3.0 L Turbo V6	115	+9 Laps
14	GTD Pro	3	(United States) Corvette Racing by Pratt Miller Motorsports	(Spain) Antonio García (United Kingdom) Alexander Sims	Chevrolet Corvette Z06 GT3.R	114	+10 Laps
14	GTD Pro	3	(United States) Corvette Racing by Pratt Miller Motorsports	(Spain) Antonio García (United Kingdom) Alexander Sims	Chevrolet LT6 5.5 L V8	114	+10 Laps
15	GTD Pro	9	(Canada) Pfaff Motorsports	(Italy) Andrea Caldarelli (Italy) Marco Mapelli	Lamborghini Huracán GT3 Evo 2	114	+10 Laps
15	GTD Pro	9	(Canada) Pfaff Motorsports	(Italy) Andrea Caldarelli (Italy) Marco Mapelli	Lamborghini DGF 5.2 L V10	114	+10 Laps
16	**GTD**	**57**	**(United States) Winward Racing**	**(Switzerland) Philip Ellis (United States) Russell Ward**	**Mercedes-AMG GT3 Evo**	**114**	**+10 Laps‡**
16	**GTD**	**57**	**(United States) Winward Racing**	**(Switzerland) Philip Ellis (United States) Russell Ward**	**Mercedes-Benz M159 6.2 L V8**	**114**	**+10 Laps‡**
17	GTD	12	(United States) Vasser Sullivan Racing	(United Kingdom) Jack Hawksworth (Canada) Parker Thompson	Lexus RC F GT3	114	+10 Laps
17	GTD	12	(United States) Vasser Sullivan Racing	(United Kingdom) Jack Hawksworth (Canada) Parker Thompson	Toyota 2UR-GSE 5.4 L V8	114	+10 Laps
18	GTD Pro	48	(United States) Paul Miller Racing	(United Kingdom) Dan Harper (Germany) Max Hesse	BMW M4 GT3 Evo	114	+10 Laps
18	GTD Pro	48	(United States) Paul Miller Racing	(United Kingdom) Dan Harper (Germany) Max Hesse	BMW P58 3.0 L Turbo I6	114	+10 Laps
19	GTD Pro	4	(United States) Corvette Racing by Pratt Miller Motorsports	(Netherlands) Nicky Catsburg (United States) Tommy Milner	Chevrolet Corvette Z06 GT3.R	114	+10 Laps
19	GTD Pro	4	(United States) Corvette Racing by Pratt Miller Motorsports	(Netherlands) Nicky Catsburg (United States) Tommy Milner	Chevrolet LT6 5.5 L V8	114	+10 Laps
20	GTD	34	(United States) Conquest Racing	(United States) Manny Franco (Brazil) Daniel Serra	Ferrari 296 GT3	114	+10 Laps
20	GTD	34	(United States) Conquest Racing	(United States) Manny Franco (Brazil) Daniel Serra	Ferrari F163CE 3.0 L Turbo V6	114	+10 Laps
21	GTD	32	(United States) Korthoff Competition Motors	(United States) Kenton Koch (United States) Seth Lucas	Mercedes-AMG GT3 Evo	114	+10 Laps
21	GTD	32	(United States) Korthoff Competition Motors	(United States) Kenton Koch (United States) Seth Lucas	Mercedes-Benz M159 6.2 L V8	114	+10 Laps
22	GTD	78	(United States) Forte Racing	(Germany) Mario Farnbacher (Canada) Misha Goikhberg	Lamborghini Huracán GT3 Evo 2	114	+10 Laps
22	GTD	78	(United States) Forte Racing	(Germany) Mario Farnbacher (Canada) Misha Goikhberg	Lamborghini DGF 5.2 L V10	114	+10 Laps
23	GTD	120	(United States) Wright Motorsports	(United States) Adam Adelson (United States) Elliott Skeer	Porsche 911 GT3 R (992)	114	+10 Laps
23	GTD	120	(United States) Wright Motorsports	(United States) Adam Adelson (United States) Elliott Skeer	Porsche M97/80 4.2 L Flat-6	114	+10 Laps
24	GTD	023	(United States) Triarsi Competizione	(Italy) Riccardo Agostini (United States) Onofrio Triarsi	Ferrari 296 GT3	114	+10 Laps
24	GTD	023	(United States) Triarsi Competizione	(Italy) Riccardo Agostini (United States) Onofrio Triarsi	Ferrari F163CE 3.0 L Turbo V6	114	+10 Laps
25	GTD Pro	14	(United States) Vasser Sullivan Racing	(Germany) Marvin Kirchhöfer (United States) Aaron Telitz	Lexus RC F GT3	114	+10 Laps
25	GTD Pro	14	(United States) Vasser Sullivan Racing	(Germany) Marvin Kirchhöfer (United States) Aaron Telitz	Toyota 2UR-GSE 5.40 L V8	114	+10 Laps
26	GTD	45	(United States) Wayne Taylor Racing	(Costa Rica) Danny Formal (United States) Trent Hindman	Lamborghini Huracán GT3 Evo 2	114	+10 Laps
26	GTD	45	(United States) Wayne Taylor Racing	(Costa Rica) Danny Formal (United States) Trent Hindman	Lamborghini DGF 5.2 L V10	114	+10 Laps
27	GTD Pro	65	(Canada) Ford Multimatic Motorsports	(Germany) Christopher Mies (Belgium) Frédéric Vervisch	Ford Mustang GT3	114	+10 Laps
27	GTD Pro	65	(Canada) Ford Multimatic Motorsports	(Germany) Christopher Mies (Belgium) Frédéric Vervisch	Ford Coyote 5.4 L V8	114	+10 Laps
28	GTD	96	(United States) Turner Motorsport	(United States) Robby Foley (United States) Patrick Gallagher	BMW M4 GT3 Evo	113	+11 Laps
28	GTD	96	(United States) Turner Motorsport	(United States) Robby Foley (United States) Patrick Gallagher	BMW P58 3.0 L Turbo I6	113	+11 Laps
29	GTD Pro	64	(Canada) Ford Multimatic Motorsports	(United Kingdom) Sebastian Priaulx (Germany) Mike Rockenfeller	Ford Mustang GT3	113	+11 Laps
29	GTD Pro	64	(Canada) Ford Multimatic Motorsports	(United Kingdom) Sebastian Priaulx (Germany) Mike Rockenfeller	Ford Coyote 5.4 L V8	113	+11 Laps
30	GTD Pro	1	(United States) Paul Miller Racing	(United States) Madison Snow (United States) Neil Verhagen	BMW M4 GT3 Evo	113	+11 Laps
30	GTD Pro	1	(United States) Paul Miller Racing	(United States) Madison Snow (United States) Neil Verhagen	BMW P58 3.0 L Turbo I6	113	+11 Laps
31	GTD	36	(United States) DXDT Racing	(United States) Alec Udell (Canada) Robert Wickens	Chevrolet Corvette Z06 GT3.R	113	+11 Laps
31	GTD	36	(United States) DXDT Racing	(United States) Alec Udell (Canada) Robert Wickens	Chevrolet LT6 5.5 L V8	113	+11 Laps
32	GTD	021	(United States) Triarsi Competizione	(United Kingdom) Stevan McAleer (United States) Sheena Monk	Ferrari 296 GT3	113	+11 Laps
32	GTD	021	(United States) Triarsi Competizione	(United Kingdom) Stevan McAleer (United States) Sheena Monk	Ferrari F163CE 3.0 L Turbo V6	113	+11 Laps
33	GTD	27	(United States) Heart of Racing Team	(United Kingdom) Casper Stevenson (United Kingdom) Darren Turner	Aston Martin Vantage AMR GT3 Evo	113	+11 Laps
33	GTD	27	(United States) Heart of Racing Team	(United Kingdom) Casper Stevenson (United Kingdom) Darren Turner	Aston Martin M177 4.0 L Turbo V8	113	+11 Laps
34	GTD	13	(Canada) AWA	(United Kingdom) Matt Bell (Canada) Orey Fidani	Chevrolet Corvette Z06 GT3.R	113	+11 Laps
34	GTD	13	(Canada) AWA	(United Kingdom) Matt Bell (Canada) Orey Fidani	Chevrolet LT6 5.5 L V8	113	+11 Laps
35	GTD	66	(United States) Gradient Racing	(United States) Jenson Altzman (United States) Robert Megennis	Ford Mustang GT3	112	+12 Laps
35	GTD	66	(United States) Gradient Racing	(United States) Jenson Altzman (United States) Robert Megennis	Ford Coyote 5.4 L V8	112	+12 Laps
36 DNF	GTD	70	(United Kingdom) Inception Racing	(United States) Brendan Iribe (Denmark) Frederik Schandorff	Ferrari 296 GT3	105	Engine
36 DNF	GTD	70	(United Kingdom) Inception Racing	(United States) Brendan Iribe (Denmark) Frederik Schandorff	Ferrari F163CE 3.0 L Turbo V6	105	Engine

== Standings after the race ==
GTP Drivers' Championship standings
Pos.	+/–	Driver	Points
1		(Brazil) Felipe Nasr (United Kingdom) Nick Tandy	1490
2		(France) Mathieu Jaminet (Australia) Matt Campbell	1399
3		(Austria) Philipp Eng (Belgium) Dries Vanthoor	1210
4	2	(South Africa) Sheldon van der Linde (Germany) Marco Wittmann	1137
5	1	(United Kingdom) Jack Aitken	1122

LMP2 Drivers' Championship standings
Pos.	+/–	Driver	Points
1		(Brazil) Felipe Fraga (United States) Gar Robinson (Australia) Josh Burdon	645
2		(United States) Dan Goldburg (United Kingdom) Paul di Resta (Sweden) Rasmus Lindh	643
3		(United States) Bijoy Garg (France) Tom Dillmann	602
4		(United States) Steven Thomas (New Zealand) Hunter McElrea (Denmark) Mikkel Jensen	591
5		(Denmark) Benjamin Pedersen (Switzerland) Mathias Beche (United States) Rodrigo Sales	576

GTD Pro Drivers' Championship standings
Pos.	+/–	Driver	Points
1	1	(Austria) Klaus Bachler (Germany) Laurin Heinrich	1014
2	3	(Spain) Antonio García (United Kingdom) Alexander Sims	944
3	3	(Spain) Albert Costa	939
4	3	(Germany) Christopher Mies (Belgium) Frédéric Vervisch	907
5	2	(United Kingdom) Dan Harper (Germany) Max Hesse	860

GTD Drivers' Championship standings
Pos.	+/–	Driver	Points
1		(Switzerland) Philip Ellis (United States) Russell Ward	1372
2		(United Kingdom) Jack Hawksworth (Canada) Parker Thompson	1248
3	1	(United States) Adam Adelson (United States) Elliott Skeer	1166
4	1	(United Kingdom) Casper Stevenson	1105
5	1	(United States) Robby Foley (United States) Patrick Gallagher	1078

Note: Only the top five positions are included for all sets of standings.

GTP Teams' Championship standings
Pos.	+/–	Team	Points
1		(Germany) #7 Porsche Penske Motorsport	1490
2		(Germany) #6 Porsche Penske Motorsport	1399
3		(United States) #24 BMW M Team RLL	1210
4	2	(United States) #25 BMW M Team RLL	1137
5	1	(United States) #31 Cadillac Whelen	1122

LMP2 Teams' Championship standings
Pos.	+/–	Team	Points
1		(United States) #74 Riley	645
2		(United States) #22 United Autosports USA	643
3		(Poland) #43Inter Europol Competition	602
4		(France) #11 TDS Racing	591
5		(United States) #52 PR1/Mathiasen Motorsports	576

GTD Pro Teams' Championship standings
Pos.	+/–	Team	Points
1	1	(United States) #77 AO Racing	1014
2	3	(United States) #3 Corvette Racing by Pratt Miller Motorsports	944
3	3	(United States) #81 DragonSpeed	939
4	3	(Canada) #65 Ford Multimatic Motorsports	907
5	2	(United States) #48 Paul Miller Racing	860

GTD Teams' Championship standings
Pos.	+/–	Team	Points
1		(United States) #57 Winward Racing	1372
2		(United States) #12 Vasser Sullivan Racing	1248
3	1	(United States) #120 Wright Motorsports	1166
4	1	(United States) #27 Heart of Racing Team	1105
5		(United States) #96 Turner Motorsport	1078

Note: Only the top five positions are included for all sets of standings.

GTP Manufacturers' Championship standings
Pos.	+/–	Manufacturer	Points
1		(Germany) Porsche	1524
2		(Germany) BMW	1360
3		(Japan) Acura	1322
4		(United States) Cadillac	1274
5		(United Kingdom) Aston Martin	877

GTD Pro Manufacturers' Championship standings
Pos.	+/–	Manufacturer	Points
1	2	(Germany) Porsche	1036
2		(Germany) BMW	974
3	2	(Italy) Ferrari	973
4		(United States) Chevrolet	968
5	4	(United States) Ford	954

GTD Manufacturers' Championship standings
Pos.	+/–	Manufacturer	Points
1	1	(Germany) Mercedes-AMG	1404
2	1	(Japan) Lexus	1309
3	2	(Germany) Porsche	1305
4	2	(Italy) Ferrari	1208
5	1	(United Kingdom) Aston Martin	1186

Note: Only the top five positions are included for all sets of standings.

IMSA SportsCar Championship
Previous race: Grand Prix of Long Beach	2025 season	Next race: Chevrolet Detroit Sports Car Classic
