= 2021 Mazda MX-5 Cup =

Motor racing competition

The 2021 Idemitsu Mazda MX-5 Cup presented by BF Goodrich was a single-make motor racing championship, the 17th season of the Mazda MX-5 Cup and the 1st under a new sanctioning agreement with the International Motor Sports Association (IMSA). The series began on January 28 at Daytona International Speedway, and concluded on November 12 at Michelin Raceway Road Atlanta after 14 rounds. Gresham Wagner won the driver's championship, earning Spark Performance the entrant's championship as well. Sam Paley won the Rookie of the Year championship with McCumbee McAleer Racing.

== Schedule ==
The schedule was initially announced on October 28, 2020, and features 14 rounds across seven double-header weekends. On December 17, 2020, the schedule was revised, along with the 2021 WeatherTech SportsCar Championship schedule, due to the ongoing COVID-19 pandemic.

On January 6, 2021, the St. Petersburg event was rescheduled from its March date to April 23–25, due to the COVID-19 pandemic.

On February 8, 2021, IMSA announced an additional double-header event to be held during the 12 Hours of Sebring event weekend in March. Rounds 3 and 4 at Sebring will serve as a replacement for a future race venue to be announced at a later date. Thus, the 2021 MX-5 Cup Championship will still be composed of 14 rounds at seven tracks.

On April 7, 2021, the Canadian Tire Motorsport Park event scheduled for July 2-4 was cancelled due to COVID-19 quarantine requirements.

All races are 45 minutes in length.

Rnd.	Circuit	Location	Dates
1	Daytona International Speedway (Road Course)	(United States) Daytona Beach, Florida	January 27-29
2	Daytona International Speedway (Road Course)	(United States) Daytona Beach, Florida	January 27-29
3	Sebring International Raceway	(United States) Sebring, Florida	March 17-19
4	Sebring International Raceway	(United States) Sebring, Florida	March 17-19
5	Streets of St. Petersburg	(United States) St. Petersburg, Florida	April 23–25
6	Streets of St. Petersburg	(United States) St. Petersburg, Florida	April 23–25
7	Mid-Ohio Sports Car Course	(United States) Lexington, Ohio	May 14–16
8	Mid-Ohio Sports Car Course	(United States) Lexington, Ohio	May 14–16
9	Road America	(United States) Elkhart Lake, Wisconsin	August 6–8
10	Road America	(United States) Elkhart Lake, Wisconsin	August 6–8
11	WeatherTech Raceway Laguna Seca	(United States) Monterey, California	September 10–12
12	WeatherTech Raceway Laguna Seca	(United States) Monterey, California	September 10–12
13	Michelin Raceway Road Atlanta	(United States) Braselton, Georgia	November 10-12
14	Michelin Raceway Road Atlanta	(United States) Braselton, Georgia	November 10-12

== Confirmed Entries ==
All competitors utilize the Mazda MX-5 Cup car, modified to their homologated racing specification by Flis Performance.

Team	No.	Driver		Rounds
(United States) Carter Racing Enterprises	08	(United States) Michael Carter		All
(United States) Copeland Motorsports	4	(Puerto Rico) Bryan Ortiz		1–8
(United States) Copeland Motorsports	26	(United States) Peter Atwater	R	1–2, 5–8
(United States) Copeland Motorsports	38	(United States) Daniel Williams	R	1–10
(United States) Copeland Motorsports	41	(United States) Luca Mars	R	All
(United States) Copeland Motorsports	43	(United States) Joey Atanasio	R	1–2
(United States) Copeland Motorsports	51	(United States) Dean Copeland		11–12
(United States) Hixon Motorsports	37	(United States) Sabré Cook	R	1–2
(United States) Hixon Motorsports	42	(United States) Preston Pardus		1–2
(United States) Hixon Motorsports	47	(United States) Bryan Hixon		1–12
(United States) Hixon Motorsports	63	(United States) Savanna Little	R	1–10, 13–14
(United States) Hixon Motorsports	72	(United States) Hannah Grisham	R	1–2
(United States) Hixon Motorsports	72	(United States) Connor Zilisch	R	13–14
(United States) Hixon Motorsports	73	(United States) Dan Moen		3–4
(United States) Hixon Motorsports	87	(United States) Selin Rollan		All
(United States) Hixon Motorsports	92	(United States) Loni Unser		All
(United States) Hixon Motorsports	98	(United States) Derek Ware		1–2
(United States) Hixon Motorsports	11	(United States) Andrew Carbonell		9–10
(United States) Hixon Motorsports	22	(Canada) Alex Berg	R	13–14
(Republic of Ireland) Irish Mike's Racing	95	(United States) Todd Buras		3–4
(United States) JTR Motorsports Engineering	32	(United States) Chris Nunes	R	All
(United States) JTR Motorsports Engineering	96	(United States) Jared Thomas		All
(United States) JTR Motorsports Engineering	82	(United States) Woody Heimann	R	7–14
(United States) JTR Motorsports Engineering	26	(United States) Peter Atwater	R	9–14
(United States) JTR Motorsports Engineering	97	(United States) Daniel Williams	R	11–12
(United States) JTR Motorsports Engineering	69	(United States) Anthony McIntosh	R	13–14
(United States) McCumbee McAleer Racing	13	(United States) Jenson Altzman	R	All
(United States) McCumbee McAleer Racing	28	(United States) Sam Paley	R	All
(United States) McCumbee McAleer Racing	31	(United States) John Jodoin	R	3–4, 8–12
(United States) McCumbee McAleer Racing	48	(United States) Zachry Lee		3–8,11–12
(United States) McCumbee McAleer Racing	55	(Russia) Moisey Uretsky		All
(United States) McCumbee McAleer Racing	89	(United States) Justin Piscitell		All
(United States) Provision Motorsports	24	(United States) Aaron Jeansonne	R	1–14
(United States) Provision Motorsports	99	(United States) Drake Kemper		1–8, 13–14
(United States) Provision Motorsports	43	(United States) Joey Atanasio	R	3–4
(United States) Provision Motorsports	99	(United States) Drake Kemper		1–8, 13–14
(United States) Provision Motorsports	99	(United States) Bruno Carneiro		11–12
(United States) Slipstream Performance	12	(United States) Mike Globe		3–4, 7–10, 13–14
(United States) Slipstream Performance	20	(Argentina) Hernan Palermo		1–4, 7–14
(United States) Slipstream Performance	33	(Russia) Alex Bachoura		All
(United States) Slipstream Performance	36	(United States) David Staab		All
(United States) Spark Performance	5	(United States) Gresham Wagner		All
Team Guatemala Racing	59	(Guatemala) Juan Hernandez Leiva	R	1–8

R = Eligible for Rookie's Championship

== Race results ==
Rnd.	Circuit	Winning driver	Pole position	Fastest lap	Hard Charger
1	Daytona	(United States) Gresham Wagner	(United States) Gresham Wagner	(United States) Gresham Wagner	(United States) Jenson Altzman
2	Daytona	(United States) Michael Carter	(United States) Gresham Wagner	(United States) Preston Pardus	(Argentina) Hernan Palermo
3	Sebring	(United States) Selin Rollan	(United States) Gresham Wagner	(United States) Chris Nunes	(United States) Todd Buras
4	Sebring	(United States) Gresham Wagner	(United States) Sam Paley	(United States) Michael Carter	(United States) Todd Buras
5	St. Petersburg	(United States) Selin Rollan	(United States) Michael Carter	(United States) Michael Carter	(United States) Aaron Jeansonne
6	St. Petersburg	(United States) Michael Carter	(United States) Michael Carter	(United States) Selin Rollan	(Russia) Alex Bachoura
7	Mid-Ohio	(United States) Selin Rollan	(United States) Michael Carter	(United States) Selin Rollan	(United States) Luca Mars
8	Mid-Ohio	(United States) Chris Nunes	(United States) Gresham Wagner	(Argentina) Hernan Palermo	(United States) Luca Mars
9	Road America	(United States) Selin Rollan	(United States) Selin Rollan	(United States) Gresham Wagner	(United States) Michael Carter
10	Road America	(United States) Michael Carter	(United States) Gresham Wagner	(United States) Michael Carter	(United States) John Jodoin
11	Laguna Seca	(United States) Gresham Wagner	(United States) Selin Rollan	(United States) Selin Rollan	(Russia) Alex Bachoura
12	Laguna Seca	(United States) Gresham Wagner	(United States) Selin Rollan	(United States) Bruno Carneiro	(Russia) Moisey Uretsky
13	Road Atlanta	(United States) Gresham Wagner	(United States) Gresham Wagner	(United States) Connor Zilisch	(United States) Chris Nunes
14	Road Atlanta	(United States) Jared Thomas	(United States) Selin Rollan	(United States) Jared Thomas	(United States) Luca Mars

== Championship Standings ==
=== Points System ===
Championship points are awarded at the finish of each event according to the chart below.

Position	1	2	3	4	5	6	7	8	9	10	11	12	13	14	15	16	17	18	19	20	21	22	23	24	25	26	27	28	29	30 or below
Points	350	320	300	280	260	250	240	230	220	210	200	190	180	170	160	150	140	130	120	110	100	90	80	70	60	50	40	30	20	10

For each race, bonus points are awarded for the following:

Award	Points
Pole Position	10
Most Race Laps Led	10
Fastest Race Lap	10

- The ten (10) additional points for achieving pole position are not awarded if the starting grid is determined by “Other Means”.
- In the case of a tie for the most laps led, the Competitor that finishes the highest in the running order is declared the winner.
- In the case of a tie for the fastest Race lap, the Competitor that first achieves the fastest Race lap is declared the winner.

=== Driver's Championship ===
IMSA recognizes Driver champions based on the total number of championship points earned during the season.

Pos.	Driver	DAY		SEB		STP		MOH		ELK		LGA		ATL		Bonus	Points
Pos.	Driver	1	2	3	4	5	6	7	8	9	10	11	12	13	14	Bonus	Points
1	(United States) Gresham Wagner	**1**	**3**	**3**	1	17	3	4	**2**	2	**5**	1	1	**1**	6	120	4330
2	(United States) Michael Carter	9	1	2	2	**2**	**1**	**6**	6	4	1	4	6	3	3	100	4240
3	(United States) Selin Rollan	6	4	1	9	1	18	1	7	**1**	3	**2**	**2**	5	**2**	110	4150
4	(United States) Chris Nunes	4	10	12	10	3	6	12	1	5	7	19	3	4	7	10	3430
5	(United States) Sam Paley	2	5	7	**22**	20	2	2	15	3	2	6	5	9	9	20	3410
6	(United States) Luca Mars	13	9	26	7	5	4	7	3	12	8	9	4	7	4	0	3210
7	(United States) Justin Piscitell	5	6	4	25	19	9	3	5	7	10	23	7	6	10	0	2980
8	(United States) Aaron Jeansonne	8	12	6	4	10	21	13	19	8	4	3	20	8	22	0	2800
9	(United States) Jared Thomas	3	2	25	8	21	16	5	24^{†}	22	DNS	5	8	2	1	10	2750
10	(United States) Jenson Altzman	16	25	27	6	4	17	11	22	10	6	7	10	10	8	0	2560
11	(United States) David Staab	22	16	17	14	11	12	14	20	11	11	20	22	13	12	0	2190
12	(Russia) Alex Bachoura	18	24	16	13	9	11	18	21	20	14	11	13	17	17	0	2120
13	(Russia) Moisey Uretsky	24	21	19	26	16	13	19	9	15	13	14	9	21	11	0	2040
14	(Argentina) Hernan Palermo	27^{†}	14	11	24			8	10	9	21	8	19	11	21	10	1900
15	(United States) Bryan Hixon	14	19	15	17	13	14	22	13	16	15	17	15			0	1820
16	(United States) Loni Unser	25	26	18	15	7	10	16	23	14	12	16	14	DNS	DNS	0	1760
17	(Puerto Rico) Bryan Ortiz	11	11	13	3	6	5	15	12							0	1740
18	(United States) Daniel Williams	21	22	14	12	22^{†}	8	10	18	19	16	18	18			0	1740
19	(United States) Drake Kemper	19	8	5	11	17	DNS	25^{†}	8					18	14	0	1540
20	(United States) Peter Atwater	15	17			8	19	21	DNS	DNS	17	15	17	12	20	0	1490
21	(United States) Savanna Little	23	23	20	19	14	20	23	14	17	18			19	18	0	1440
22	(United States) Zachry Lee			9	16	15	15	17	11			10	16			0	1390
23	(Guatemala) Juan Hernandez	17	27	23	18	12	7	9	4							0	1320
24	(United States) Woody Heimann							20	17	13	22	12	12	14	15	0	1230
25	(United States) John Jodoin			10	23					21	9	13	11			0	990
26	(United States) Mike Globe			22	21			24	16	18	20			20	19	0	880
27	(United States) Joey Atanasio	10	15	24	20											0	550
28	(United States) Preston Pardus	7	7													20	500
29	(United States) Todd Buras			8	5											0	490
30	(United States) Andrew Carbonell									6	19					0	370
31	(United States) Sabré Cook	12	13													0	370
32	(United States) Connor Zilisch													22	5	10	360
33	(Canada) Alex Berg													16	13	0	330
34	(United States) Anthony McIntosh													15	16	0	310
35	(United States) Hannah Grisham	20	20													0	220
36	(United States) Bruno Carneiro											22	21			10	200
37	(United States) Derek Ware	26	18													0	180
38	(United States) Dean Copeland											21	23			0	180
39	(United States) Dan Moen			21	27											0	140
Pos.	Driver	DAY		SEB		STP		MOH		ELK		LGA		ATL		Bonus	Points

Bold = Pole Position

Italics = Fastest Race Lap

Underline = Most Laps Led

† = Post-race penalty; moved to back of class

=== Entrant's Championship ===
Each Entrant receives championship points for its highest Car finishing position in each class in each race. The positions of subsequent finishing cars from the same entrant are not considered in the results and all other cars are elevated in the finishing positions accordingly.

Pos.	Entrant	DAY		SEB		STP		MOH		ELK		LGA		ATL		Bonus	Points
Pos.	Entrant	1	2	3	4	5	6	7	8	9	10	11	12	13	14	Bonus	Points
1	Spark Performance	**1**	**3**	**3**	1	17	3	4	**2**	2	**5**	1	1	**1**	6	120	4450
2	Hixon Motorsports	6	4	1	9	1	10	1	7	**1**	3	**2**	**2**	5	**2**	140	4350
3	Carter Racing Enterprises	9	1	2	2	**2**	**1**	**6**	6	4	1	4	6	3	3	100	4280
4	JTR Motorsports Engineering	3	2	12	8	3	6	5	1	5	7	5	3	2	1	20	4040
5	McCumbee McAleer Racing	2	5	4	**6**	4	2	2	5	3	2	6	5	6	8	20	3950
6	Copeland Motorsports	10	15	13	3	5	4	7	3	12	8	9	4	7	4	0	3600
7	Provision Motorsports	8	8	5	4	10	21	13	8	8	4	3	20	8	14	10	3500
8	Slipstream Performance	19	14	11	13	9	11	14	20	9	11	8	13	11	12	10	3280
9	Team Guatemala Racing	17	27	23	18	12	7	9	4							0	1860
10	Irish Mike's Racing			8	5											0	510
Pos.	Entrant	DAY		SEB		STP		MOH		ELK		LGA		ATL		Bonus	Points

Bold = Pole Position

Italics = Fastest Race Lap

Underline = Most Laps Led

=== Rookie's Championship ===
Rookie points are awarded based on the Car’s finishing position for each Rookie Driver, with the finishing positions of Cars without Rookie Drivers not considered in the results and all other Cars with Rookie Drivers elevated in the finishing positions accordingly.

Pos.	Driver	DAY		SEB		STP		MOH		ELK		LGA		ATL		Points
Pos.	Driver	1	2	3	4	5	6	7	8	9	10	11	12	13	14	Points
1	(United States) Sam Paley	2	5	7	22	20	2	2	15	3	2	6	5	9	9	4290
2	(United States) Chris Nunes	4	10	12	10	3	6	12	1	5	7	19	3	4	7	4250
3	(United States) Luca Mars	13	9	26	7	5	4	7	3	12	8	9	4	7	4	4140
4	(United States) Aaron Jeansonne	8	12	6	4	10	21	13	19	8	4	3	20	8	22	3920
5	(United States) Jenson Altzman	16	25	27	6	4	17	11	27	10	6	7	10	10	8	3720
6	(United States) Daniel Williams	21	22	14	12	22^{†}	8	10	18	19	16	18	18			2870
7	(United States) Savanna Little	23	23	20	19	14	20	23	14	17	18			19	18	2740
8	(United States) Peter Atwater	15	17			8	19	21	DNS	DNS	17	15	17	12	20	2390
9	(Guatemala) Juan Hernandez	17	27	23	18	12	7	9	4							2030
10	(United States) Woody Heimann							20	17	13	22	12	12	14	15	1930
11	(United States) John Jodoin			10	23					21	9	13	11			1490
12	(United States) Joey Atanasio	10	15	24	20											990
13	(United States) Connor Zilisch													22	5	520
14	(United States) Sabré Cook	12	13													520
15	(Canada) Alex Berg													16	13	470
16	(United States) Anthony McIntosh													15	16	460
17	(United States) Hannah Grisham	20	20													440
Pos.	Driver	DAY		SEB		STP		MOH		ELK		LGA		ATL		Points

† = Post-race penalty; moved to back of class
