= 2024 Michelin Pilot Challenge =

Motor racing competition

The 2024 Michelin Pilot Challenge was the twenty-fifth season of the IMSA SportsCar Challenge and the eleventh season organized by the International Motor Sports Association (IMSA). The season began on January 26 at Daytona International Speedway and concluded on October 11 at Road Atlanta. It featured a round of the TCR World Tour.

== Classes ==
- Grand Sport (GS) (run to GT4 regulations)
- Touring Car (TCR)

== Calendar ==
The provisional 2024 calendar was released on August 4, 2023, featuring ten rounds.

Round	Race	Circuit	Location	Date	Duration
1	BMW M Endurance Challenge at Daytona	(United States) Daytona International Speedway	Daytona Beach, Florida	January 25–26	4 Hours
2	Alan Jay Automotive Network 120	(United States) Sebring International Raceway	Sebring, Florida	March 13–15	2 Hours
3	WeatherTech Raceway Laguna Seca 120	(United States) WeatherTech Raceway Laguna Seca	Monterey, California	May 10–12	2 Hours
4	O’Reilly Auto Parts Four Hours of Mid-Ohio	(United States) Mid-Ohio Sports Car Course	Lexington, Ohio	June 7–9	4 Hours
5	Watkins Glen International 120	(United States) Watkins Glen International	Watkins Glen, New York	June 20–22	2 Hours
6	Canadian Tire Motorsport Park 120	(Canada) Canadian Tire Motorsport Park	Bowmanville, Ontario	July 12–14	2 Hours
7	Road America 120	(United States) Road America	Elkhart Lake, Wisconsin	August 2–4	2 Hours
8	Virginia Is Racing for Lovers Grand Prix	(United States) Virginia International Raceway	Alton, Virginia	August 23–25	2 Hours
9	Indianapolis Motor Speedway 120	(United States) Indianapolis Motor Speedway	Speedway, Indiana	September 20–21	2 Hours
10	Fox Factory 120	(United States) Michelin Raceway Road Atlanta	Braselton, Georgia	October 9–11	2 Hours

Calendar Changes

- The single-class events at Detroit (GS) and Lime Rock Park (TCR) were dropped from the schedule for 2024.
- Mid-Ohio Sports Car Course returned to the schedule after a one-year absence, replacing Indianapolis as the second four-hour event after Daytona.

== Entry list ==
=== Grand Sport (GS) ===
Team	Car	Engine	No.	Drivers	Rounds
(United States) Automatic Racing AMR	Aston Martin Vantage AMR GT4	Aston Martin M177 4.0 L Twin-Turbo V8	09	(United States) Rob Ecklin	1–2, 5
(United States) Automatic Racing AMR	Aston Martin Vantage AMR GT4	Aston Martin M177 4.0 L Twin-Turbo V8	09	(United States) Ramin Abdolvahabi	1–2
(United States) Automatic Racing AMR	Aston Martin Vantage AMR GT4	Aston Martin M177 4.0 L Twin-Turbo V8	09	(United States) Brandon Kidd	1
(United States) Automatic Racing AMR	Aston Martin Vantage AMR GT4	Aston Martin M177 4.0 L Twin-Turbo V8	09	(United States) John Potter	5
(United States) Automatic Racing AMR	Aston Martin Vantage AMR GT4	Aston Martin M177 4.0 L Twin-Turbo V8	9	(United States) Brandon Kidd	5
(United States) Automatic Racing AMR	Aston Martin Vantage AMR GT4	Aston Martin M177 4.0 L Twin-Turbo V8	9	(United States) Tom Long	5
(United States) Czabok-Simpson Motorsport	Porsche 718 Cayman GT4 RS Clubsport	Porsche MDG 4.0 L Flat-6	2	(United States) Gordon Scully	2–3
(United States) Czabok-Simpson Motorsport	Porsche 718 Cayman GT4 RS Clubsport	Porsche MDG 4.0 L Flat-6	2	(United States) Jackson Lee	2
(United States) Czabok-Simpson Motorsport	Porsche 718 Cayman GT4 RS Clubsport	Porsche MDG 4.0 L Flat-6	2	(United States) Mat Pombo	3
(United States) Czabok-Simpson Motorsport	Porsche 718 Cayman GT4 RS Clubsport	Porsche MDG 4.0 L Flat-6	67	(Puerto Rico) Sebastian Carazo	All
(United States) Czabok-Simpson Motorsport	Porsche 718 Cayman GT4 RS Clubsport	Porsche MDG 4.0 L Flat-6	67	Nikita Lastochkin (Note: Uretsky and Lastochkin are Russian, but compete as a neutral competitor as Russian national emblems were banned by the FIA following the Russian invasion of Ukraine.)	1–5
(United States) Czabok-Simpson Motorsport	Porsche 718 Cayman GT4 RS Clubsport	Porsche MDG 4.0 L Flat-6	67	(United States) Gordon Scully	1, 7–8
(United States) Czabok-Simpson Motorsport	Porsche 718 Cayman GT4 RS Clubsport	Porsche MDG 4.0 L Flat-6	67	(United States) Jackson Lee	4, 6, 9–10
(United States) JTR Motorsports Engineering	Porsche 718 Cayman GT4 RS Clubsport	Porsche MDG 4.0 L Flat-6	3	(United States) Nick Shaeffer	4, 6
(United States) JTR Motorsports Engineering	Porsche 718 Cayman GT4 RS Clubsport	Porsche MDG 4.0 L Flat-6	3	(United States) Jared Thomas	4, 6
(United States) McCumbee McAleer Racing with Aerosport	Ford Mustang GT4 (2024)	Ford 5.0 L Coyote V8	13	(United States) Jenson Altzman	All
(United States) McCumbee McAleer Racing with Aerosport	Ford Mustang GT4 (2024)	Ford 5.0 L Coyote V8	13	(United States) Chad McCumbee	1–6, 8
(United States) McCumbee McAleer Racing with Aerosport	Ford Mustang GT4 (2024)	Ford 5.0 L Coyote V8	13	(Canada) Gavin Sanders	7
(United States) McCumbee McAleer Racing with Aerosport	Ford Mustang GT4 (2024)	Ford 5.0 L Coyote V8	13	(United States) Nate Cicero	9
(United States) McCumbee McAleer Racing with Aerosport	Ford Mustang GT4 (2024)	Ford 5.0 L Coyote V8	13	(United States) Sam Paley	10
(United States) Skip Barber Racing AMR	Aston Martin Vantage AMR GT4	Aston Martin M177 4.0 L Twin-Turbo V8	16	(United States) Ken Fukuda	1–5, 7–8
(United States) Skip Barber Racing AMR	Aston Martin Vantage AMR GT4	Aston Martin M177 4.0 L Twin-Turbo V8	16	(United States) Will Lambros	1–5, 8
(United States) Skip Barber Racing AMR	Aston Martin Vantage AMR GT4	Aston Martin M177 4.0 L Twin-Turbo V8	16	(United States) Carter Fartuch	1
(United States) Skip Barber Racing AMR	Aston Martin Vantage AMR GT4	Aston Martin M177 4.0 L Twin-Turbo V8	16	(United States) Ross Chastain	7
(United States) Van der Steur Racing	Aston Martin Vantage AMR GT4	Aston Martin M177 4.0 L Twin-Turbo V8	19	(United States) Rory van der Steur	All
(United States) Van der Steur Racing	Aston Martin Vantage AMR GT4	Aston Martin M177 4.0 L Twin-Turbo V8	19	(France) Valentin Hasse-Clot	1–2, 5, 7, 10
(United States) Van der Steur Racing	Aston Martin Vantage AMR GT4	Aston Martin M177 4.0 L Twin-Turbo V8	19	(Australia) Scott Andrews	6, 8
(United States) Van der Steur Racing	Aston Martin Vantage AMR GT4	Aston Martin M177 4.0 L Twin-Turbo V8	19	(United States) Dominic Starkweather	1
(United States) Van der Steur Racing	Aston Martin Vantage AMR GT4	Aston Martin M177 4.0 L Twin-Turbo V8	19	(France) Alexandre Prémat	3, 9
(United States) Van der Steur Racing	Aston Martin Vantage AMR GT4	Aston Martin M177 4.0 L Twin-Turbo V8	19	(Costa Rica) Danny Formal	4
(United States) Van der Steur Racing with Ruckus Racing	Aston Martin Vantage AMR GT4	Aston Martin M177 4.0 L Twin-Turbo V8	82	(United States) Brady Behrman	5, 9–10
(United States) Van der Steur Racing with Ruckus Racing	Aston Martin Vantage AMR GT4	Aston Martin M177 4.0 L Twin-Turbo V8	82	(United States) Scott Blind	5, 9–10
(United States) Ruckus Racing	Aston Martin Vantage AMR GT4	Aston Martin M177 4.0 L Twin-Turbo V8	45	(United States) Scott Blind	4, 6–7
(United States) Ruckus Racing	Aston Martin Vantage AMR GT4	Aston Martin M177 4.0 L Twin-Turbo V8	45	(United States) John Paul Southern Jr.	4, 7
(United States) Ruckus Racing	Aston Martin Vantage AMR GT4	Aston Martin M177 4.0 L Twin-Turbo V8	45	(United States) Andrew Davis	6
(United States) Rearden Racing	Porsche 718 Cayman GT4 RS Clubsport	Porsche MDG 4.0 L Flat-6	21	(Bulgaria) Vesko Kozarov	1–2
(United States) Rearden Racing	Porsche 718 Cayman GT4 RS Clubsport	Porsche MDG 4.0 L Flat-6	21	(United States) Jake Pedersen	1–2
(United States) Kellymoss with Riley	Porsche 718 Cayman GT4 RS Clubsport	Porsche MDG 4.0 L Flat-6	21	(United States) Jake Pedersen	3, 5
(United States) Kellymoss with Riley	Porsche 718 Cayman GT4 RS Clubsport	Porsche MDG 4.0 L Flat-6	21	(Netherlands) Kay van Berlo	3, 5
(United States) Kellymoss with Riley	Porsche 718 Cayman GT4 RS Clubsport	Porsche MDG 4.0 L Flat-6	91	(United States) Riley Dickinson	All
(United States) Kellymoss with Riley	Porsche 718 Cayman GT4 RS Clubsport	Porsche MDG 4.0 L Flat-6	91	(United States) Michael McCarthy	All
(United States) Kellymoss with Riley	Porsche 718 Cayman GT4 RS Clubsport	Porsche MDG 4.0 L Flat-6	91	(United States) Brady Golan	1
(Canada) TWOth Autosport	Porsche 718 Cayman GT4 RS Clubsport	Porsche MDG 4.0 L Flat-6	22	(Canada) Justin Di Benedetto	6
(Canada) TWOth Autosport	Porsche 718 Cayman GT4 RS Clubsport	Porsche MDG 4.0 L Flat-6	22	(Canada) Travis Hill	6
(United States) TGR Team Smooge Racing	Toyota GR Supra GT4 Evo	BMW B58B30 3.0 L Twin-Turbo I6	23	(United States) Corey Heim	1
(United States) TGR Team Smooge Racing	Toyota GR Supra GT4 Evo	BMW B58B30 3.0 L Twin-Turbo I6	23	(United States) John Hunter Nemechek	1
(United States) TGR Team Smooge Racing	Toyota GR Supra GT4 Evo	BMW B58B30 3.0 L Twin-Turbo I6	23	(United States) Bubba Wallace	1
(United States) TGR Team Smooge Racing	Toyota GR Supra GT4 Evo	BMW B58B30 3.0 L Twin-Turbo I6	68	(United States) Kevin Conway	1
(United States) TGR Team Smooge Racing	Toyota GR Supra GT4 Evo	BMW B58B30 3.0 L Twin-Turbo I6	68	(United States) John Geesbreght	1
(United States) TGR Team Smooge Racing	Toyota GR Supra GT4 Evo	BMW B58B30 3.0 L Twin-Turbo I6	68	(United States) Corey Lewis	1
(United States) RennSport1	Porsche 718 Cayman GT4 RS Clubsport	Porsche MDG 4.0 L Flat-6	28	(United States) Trent Hindman	All
(United States) RennSport1	Porsche 718 Cayman GT4 RS Clubsport	Porsche MDG 4.0 L Flat-6	28	(United Kingdom) Stevan McAleer	All
(United States) RennSport1	Porsche 718 Cayman GT4 RS Clubsport	Porsche MDG 4.0 L Flat-6	28	(United States) Austin Krainz	1, 4
(United States) JMF Motorsports	Mercedes-AMG GT4	Mercedes-AMG M178 4.0 L Twin-Turbo V8	34	(United States) Michai Stephens	1–8
(United States) JMF Motorsports	Mercedes-AMG GT4	Mercedes-AMG M178 4.0 L Twin-Turbo V8	34	(Canada) Jesse Webb	1–8
(United States) BGB Motorsports	Porsche 718 Cayman GT4 RS Clubsport	Porsche MDG 4.0 L Flat-6	38	(United States) Spencer Pumpelly	All
(United States) BGB Motorsports	Porsche 718 Cayman GT4 RS Clubsport	Porsche MDG 4.0 L Flat-6	38	(Canada) Thomas Collingwood	1–5, 7–10
(United States) BGB Motorsports	Porsche 718 Cayman GT4 RS Clubsport	Porsche MDG 4.0 L Flat-6	38	(Netherlands) Jeroen Bleekemolen	1, 4
(United States) BGB Motorsports	Porsche 718 Cayman GT4 RS Clubsport	Porsche MDG 4.0 L Flat-6	38	(United States) John Tecce	6
(United States) CarBahn with Peregrine Racing	BMW M4 GT4 Gen II	BMW S58B30T0 3.0 L Twin-Turbo I6	39	(United States) Sean McAlister	All
(United States) CarBahn with Peregrine Racing	BMW M4 GT4 Gen II	BMW S58B30T0 3.0 L Twin-Turbo I6	39	(United States) Jeff Westphal	All
(United States) Stephen Cameron Racing	BMW M4 GT4 Gen II	BMW S58B30T0 3.0 L Twin-Turbo I6	43	(United States) Greg Liefooghe	1–2
(United States) Stephen Cameron Racing	BMW M4 GT4 Gen II	BMW S58B30T0 3.0 L Twin-Turbo I6	43	(United States) Sean Quinlan	1–2
(United States) Stephen Cameron Racing	Ford Mustang GT4 (2024)	Ford 5.0 L Coyote V8	43	(United States) Greg Liefooghe	3–10
(United States) Stephen Cameron Racing	Ford Mustang GT4 (2024)	Ford 5.0 L Coyote V8	43	(United States) Sean Quinlan	3–10
(United States) Baby Bull Racing	Porsche 718 Cayman GT4 RS Clubsport	Porsche MDG 4.0 L Flat-6	44	(United States) Michael Cooper	1–3, 5–10
(United States) Baby Bull Racing	Porsche 718 Cayman GT4 RS Clubsport	Porsche MDG 4.0 L Flat-6	44	Moisey Uretsky	1–3, 5–10
(United States) Team TGM	Aston Martin Vantage AMR GT4	Aston Martin M177 4.0 L Twin-Turbo V8	46	(United States) Matt Plumb	All
(United States) Team TGM	Aston Martin Vantage AMR GT4	Aston Martin M177 4.0 L Twin-Turbo V8	46	(United States) Paul Holton	2–10
(United States) Team TGM	Aston Martin Vantage AMR GT4	Aston Martin M177 4.0 L Twin-Turbo V8	46	(United States) Owen Trinkler	1
(United States) Team TGM	Aston Martin Vantage AMR GT4	Aston Martin M177 4.0 L Twin-Turbo V8	64	(United States) Ted Giovanis	All
(United States) Team TGM	Aston Martin Vantage AMR GT4	Aston Martin M177 4.0 L Twin-Turbo V8	64	(United States) Hugh Plumb	All
(United States) Team TGM	Aston Martin Vantage AMR GT4	Aston Martin M177 4.0 L Twin-Turbo V8	64	(United States) Kris Wilson	1, 4
(United States) NOLAsport	Porsche 718 Cayman GT4 RS Clubsport	Porsche MDG 4.0 L Flat-6	47	(United States) Matt Travis	2
(United States) NOLAsport	Porsche 718 Cayman GT4 RS Clubsport	Porsche MDG 4.0 L Flat-6	47	(United States) Jason Hart	2
(Japan) TGR Team Hattori Motorsports	Toyota GR Supra GT4 Evo	BMW B58B30 3.0 L Twin-Turbo I6	50	(United Kingdom) Jack Hawksworth	1, 3, 6–7
(Japan) TGR Team Hattori Motorsports	Toyota GR Supra GT4 Evo	BMW B58B30 3.0 L Twin-Turbo I6	50	(Canada) Parker Thompson	4, 6
(Japan) TGR Team Hattori Motorsports	Toyota GR Supra GT4 Evo	BMW B58B30 3.0 L Twin-Turbo I6	50	(United States) Tyler Maxson	1
(Japan) TGR Team Hattori Motorsports	Toyota GR Supra GT4 Evo	BMW B58B30 3.0 L Twin-Turbo I6	50	(United States) Jaden Conwright	3, 7
(Japan) TGR Team Hattori Motorsports	Toyota GR Supra GT4 Evo	BMW B58B30 3.0 L Twin-Turbo I6	50	(Japan) Yuichi Nakayama	4
(Japan) TGR Team Hattori Motorsports	Toyota GR Supra GT4 Evo	BMW B58B30 3.0 L Twin-Turbo I6	50	(Colombia) Gabby Chaves	10
(Japan) TGR Team Hattori Motorsports	Toyota GR Supra GT4 Evo	BMW B58B30 3.0 L Twin-Turbo I6	50	(United States) Zach Veach	10
(Japan) TGR Team Hattori Motorsports	Toyota GR Supra GT4 Evo	BMW B58B30 3.0 L Twin-Turbo I6	51	(United States) Matt Forbush	1
(Japan) TGR Team Hattori Motorsports	Toyota GR Supra GT4 Evo	BMW B58B30 3.0 L Twin-Turbo I6	51	(United States) Nick Galante	1
(Japan) TGR Team Hattori Motorsports	Toyota GR Supra GT4 Evo	BMW B58B30 3.0 L Twin-Turbo I6	51	(United States) Mark Kvamme	1
(United States) Winward Racing	Mercedes-AMG GT4	Mercedes-AMG M178 4.0 L Twin-Turbo V8	57	(United States) Bryce Ward	All
(United States) Winward Racing	Mercedes-AMG GT4	Mercedes-AMG M178 4.0 L Twin-Turbo V8	57	(Canada) Daniel Morad	1–8, 10
(United States) Winward Racing	Mercedes-AMG GT4	Mercedes-AMG M178 4.0 L Twin-Turbo V8	57	(Switzerland) Philip Ellis	9
(United States) KohR Motorsports	Ford Mustang GT4 (2024)	Ford 5.0 L Coyote V8	59	(United States) Luca Mars	All
(United States) KohR Motorsports	Ford Mustang GT4 (2024)	Ford 5.0 L Coyote V8	59	(United States) Bob Michaelian	All
(United States) TGR Team CDR Valkyrie	Toyota GR Supra GT4 Evo	BMW B58B30 3.0 L Twin-Turbo I6	66	(United Kingdom) Amir Haleem	3
(United States) TGR Team CDR Valkyrie	Toyota GR Supra GT4 Evo	BMW B58B30 3.0 L Twin-Turbo I6	66	(United States) Brian Lock	3
(Canada) Motorsport in Action	McLaren Artura GT4	McLaren M630 3.0 L Twin-Turbo V6	69	(Canada) Jesse Lazare	1–9
(Canada) Motorsport in Action	McLaren Artura GT4	McLaren M630 3.0 L Twin-Turbo V6	69	(United States) Michael de Quesada	1–9
(United States) Rebel Rock Racing	Aston Martin Vantage AMR GT4 Evo	Aston Martin M177 4.0 L Twin-Turbo V8	71	(United Kingdom) Robin Liddell	All
(United States) Rebel Rock Racing	Aston Martin Vantage AMR GT4 Evo	Aston Martin M177 4.0 L Twin-Turbo V8	71	(United States) Frank DePew	All
(United States) Rebel Rock Racing	Aston Martin Vantage AMR GT4 Evo	Aston Martin M177 4.0 L Twin-Turbo V8	71	(United States) Andrew Davis	1, 4
(United States) Thaze Competition	Mercedes-AMG GT4	Mercedes-AMG M178 4.0 L V8	78	(United States) Josh Green	2
(United States) Thaze Competition	Mercedes-AMG GT4	Mercedes-AMG M178 4.0 L V8	78	(United States) Marc Miller	2
(United States) Lone Star Racing	Mercedes-AMG GT4	Mercedes-AMG M178 4.0 L V8	79	(Australia) Scott Andrews	9
(United States) Lone Star Racing	Mercedes-AMG GT4	Mercedes-AMG M178 4.0 L V8	79	(United States) Dan Knox	9
(United States) Archangel Motorsports	Aston Martin Vantage AMR GT4	Aston Martin M177 4.0 L Twin-Turbo V8	88	(United States) Todd Coleman	All
(United States) Archangel Motorsports	Aston Martin Vantage AMR GT4	Aston Martin M177 4.0 L Twin-Turbo V8	88	(United States) Aaron Telitz	All
(United States) Team ACP by Random Vandals	BMW M4 GT4 Gen II	BMW S58B30T0 3.0 L Twin-Turbo I6	92	(United States) Kenton Koch	1–5, 7
(United States) Team ACP by Random Vandals	BMW M4 GT4 Gen II	BMW S58B30T0 3.0 L Twin-Turbo I6	92	(United States) Paul Sparta	1–5, 7
(United States) Team ACP by Random Vandals	BMW M4 GT4 Gen II	BMW S58B30T0 3.0 L Twin-Turbo I6	94	(United States) Terry Borcheller	1
(United States) Team ACP by Random Vandals	BMW M4 GT4 Gen II	BMW S58B30T0 3.0 L Twin-Turbo I6	94	(United States) Ken Goldberg	1
(United States) Team ACP by Random Vandals	BMW M4 GT4 Gen II	BMW S58B30T0 3.0 L Twin-Turbo I6	94	(United States) Catesby Jones	1
(United States) Turner Motorsport	BMW M4 GT4 Gen II	BMW S58B30T0 3.0 L Twin-Turbo I6	95	(United States) Dillon Machavern	All
(United States) Turner Motorsport	BMW M4 GT4 Gen II	BMW S58B30T0 3.0 L Twin-Turbo I6	95	(United States) Robert Megennis	All
(United States) Turner Motorsport	BMW M4 GT4 Gen II	BMW S58B30T0 3.0 L Twin-Turbo I6	96	(United States) Robby Foley	All
(United States) Turner Motorsport	BMW M4 GT4 Gen II	BMW S58B30T0 3.0 L Twin-Turbo I6	96	(United States) Francis Selldorff	All
(United States) Turner Motorsport	BMW M4 GT4 Gen II	BMW S58B30T0 3.0 L Twin-Turbo I6	97	(United States) Vin Barletta	4
(United States) Turner Motorsport	BMW M4 GT4 Gen II	BMW S58B30T0 3.0 L Twin-Turbo I6	97	(United States) Joe Dalton	4
(United States) Turner Motorsport	BMW M4 GT4 Gen II	BMW S58B30T0 3.0 L Twin-Turbo I6	97	(United States) Patrick Gallagher	4
(United States) Goldcrest Motorsports	Porsche 718 Cayman GT4 RS Clubsport	Porsche MDG 4.0 L Flat-6	808	(United States) Jim Jonsin	10
(United States) Goldcrest Motorsports	Porsche 718 Cayman GT4 RS Clubsport	Porsche MDG 4.0 L Flat-6	808	(United States) Tom Long	10

=== Touring Car (TCR) ===
Team	Car	No.	Drivers	Rounds
(United States) KMW Motorsports with TMR Engineering	Alfa Romeo Giulietta Veloce TCR	5	(United States) William Tally	All
(United States) KMW Motorsports with TMR Engineering	Alfa Romeo Giulietta Veloce TCR	5	(United States) Tim Lewis Jr.	All
(Canada) Montreal Motorsport Group	Honda Civic Type R TCR (FL5)	6	(Canada) Louis-Philippe Montour	1–7
(Canada) Montreal Motorsport Group	Honda Civic Type R TCR (FL5)	6	(Puerto Rico) Bryan Ortiz	1–5
(Canada) Montreal Motorsport Group	Honda Civic Type R TCR (FL5)	6	(Canada) Jonathan Brel	6–7
(Canada) Montreal Motorsport Group	Honda Civic Type R TCR (FL5)	93	(Canada) Karl Wittmer	All
(Canada) Montreal Motorsport Group	Honda Civic Type R TCR (FL5)	93	(Japan) Daijiro Yoshihara	All
(Puerto Rico) Victor Gonzalez Racing Team	Honda Civic Type R TCR (FK8)	8	(United States) Colton Reynolds	1
(Puerto Rico) Victor Gonzalez Racing Team	Honda Civic Type R TCR (FK8)	8	(United States) Clayton Williams	1
(Puerto Rico) Victor Gonzalez Racing Team	Hyundai Elantra N TCR	80	(United States) Morgan Burkhard	1–5
(Puerto Rico) Victor Gonzalez Racing Team	Hyundai Elantra N TCR	80	(United States) Chase Jones	2–5
(Puerto Rico) Victor Gonzalez Racing Team	Hyundai Elantra N TCR	80	(Argentina) Julián Santero	1
(Puerto Rico) Victor Gonzalez Racing Team	Hyundai Elantra N TCR	99	(United States) Tyler Gonzalez	All
(Puerto Rico) Victor Gonzalez Racing Team	Hyundai Elantra N TCR	99	(Puerto Rico) Victor Gonzalez Jr.	1–4
(Puerto Rico) Victor Gonzalez Racing Team	Hyundai Elantra N TCR	99	(United States) Morgan Burkhard	6–10
(Puerto Rico) Victor Gonzalez Racing Team	Hyundai Elantra N TCR	99	(United States) Elliott Budzinski	4
(Puerto Rico) Victor Gonzalez Racing Team	Hyundai Elantra N TCR	99	(United States) Clayton Williams	5
(United States) StarCom Racing	Hyundai Elantra N TCR	12	(United States) Andy Lally	2, 7
(United States) StarCom Racing	Hyundai Elantra N TCR	12	(United States) Nick Tucker	2, 7
(United States) Rockwell Autosport Development	Audi RS3 LMS TCR (2017)	15	(United States) Tom O'Gorman	1, 4
(United States) Rockwell Autosport Development	Audi RS3 LMS TCR (2017)	15	(United States) Eric Rockwell	1, 4
(United States) Rockwell Autosport Development	Audi RS3 LMS TCR (2017)	15	(United States) Doug Oakley	1
(United States) Rockwell Autosport Development	Audi RS3 LMS TCR (2017)	15	(United States) Alex Rockwell	4
(United States) Unitronic/JDC-Miller MotorSports	Audi RS 3 LMS TCR (2021)	17	(United States) Chris Miller	All
(United States) Unitronic/JDC-Miller MotorSports	Audi RS 3 LMS TCR (2021)	17	(South Africa) Mikey Taylor	All
(United States) Bryan Herta Autosport with Curb-Agajanian	Hyundai Elantra N TCR	33	(United States) Harry Gottsacker	All
(United States) Bryan Herta Autosport with Curb-Agajanian	Hyundai Elantra N TCR	33	(Canada) Robert Wickens	All
(United States) Bryan Herta Autosport with Curb-Agajanian	Hyundai Elantra N TCR	76	(United States) Preston Brown	All
(United States) Bryan Herta Autosport with Curb-Agajanian	Hyundai Elantra N TCR	76	(Belgium) Denis Dupont	All
(United States) Bryan Herta Autosport with Curb-Agajanian	Hyundai Elantra N TCR	76	(Canada) Nick Looijmans	1
(United States) Bryan Herta Autosport with Curb-Agajanian	Hyundai Elantra N TCR	77	(United States) Taylor Hagler	All
(United States) Bryan Herta Autosport with Curb-Agajanian	Hyundai Elantra N TCR	77	(United States) Bryson Morris	All
(United States) Bryan Herta Autosport with Curb-Agajanian	Hyundai Elantra N TCR	98	(United States) Mason Filippi	All
(United States) Bryan Herta Autosport with Curb-Agajanian	Hyundai Elantra N TCR	98	(Canada) Mark Wilkins	All
(Canada) Baker Racing	Audi RS 3 LMS TCR (2021)	52	(Canada) Dean Baker	4, 6, 8, 10
(Canada) Baker Racing	Audi RS 3 LMS TCR (2021)	52	(Canada) Sam Baker	4, 6, 8, 10
(United States) Gou Racing	Audi RS 3 LMS TCR (2021)	55	(United States) Eddie Gou	All
(United States) Gou Racing	Audi RS 3 LMS TCR (2021)	55	(United States) Eduardo Gou	All
(United States) Road Shagger Racing	Audi RS 3 LMS TCR (2021)	61	(United States) Gavin Ernstone	1–3, 5, 7, 9
(United States) Road Shagger Racing	Audi RS 3 LMS TCR (2021)	61	(United States) Jon Morley	1–3, 5, 7
(United States) Road Shagger Racing	Audi RS 3 LMS TCR (2021)	61	(United States) Tom O'Gorman	9
(United States) Deily Motorsports	Hyundai Elantra N TCR	70	(United States) Jacob Deily	1
(United States) Deily Motorsports	Hyundai Elantra N TCR	70	(United States) Jordan Wisely	1
(United States) Deily Motorsports	Audi RS 3 LMS TCR (2021)	70	(United States) Jacob Deily	4
(United States) Deily Motorsports	Audi RS 3 LMS TCR (2021)	70	(Canada) James Vance	4
(United States) Pegram Racing	Audi RS3 LMS TCR (2017)	72	(United States) Larry Pegram	7, 9–10
(United States) Pegram Racing	Audi RS3 LMS TCR (2017)	72	(United States) Riley Pegram	7, 9–10
(United States) Racers Edge Motorsports	Honda Civic Type R TCR (FK8)	73	(United States) Tazio Ottis	1, 4–5, 9–10
(United States) Racers Edge Motorsports	Honda Civic Type R TCR (FK8)	73	(Hong Kong) Daniel Wu	1, 4–5, 9–10
(United States) HART	Honda Civic Type R TCR (FK8)	89	(United States) Chad Gilsinger	1–2, 4–5, 9
(United States) HART	Honda Civic Type R TCR (FK8)	89	(United States) Steve Eich	1–2, 4
(United States) HART	Honda Civic Type R TCR (FK8)	89	(United States) Tyler Chambers	1, 4–5, 9

== Race results ==
Bold indicates overall winner.

Round	Circuit	GS Winning Car	TCR Winning Car
Round	Circuit	GS Winning Drivers	TCR Winning Drivers
1	(United States) Daytona	**(United States) #91 Kellymoss with Riley**	(United States) #17 Unitronic/JDC-Miller MotorSports
1	(United States) Daytona	**(United States) Riley Dickinson** **(United States) Brady Golan** **(United States) Michael McCarthy**	(United States) Chris Miller (South Africa) Mikey Taylor
2	(United States) Sebring	**(United States) #71 Rebel Rock Racing**	(United States) #17 Unitronic/JDC-Miller MotorSports
2	(United States) Sebring	**(United Kingdom) Robin Liddell** **(United States) Frank DePew**	(United States) Chris Miller (South Africa) Mikey Taylor
3	(United States) Laguna Seca	**(Canada) #69 Motorsport in Action**	(United States) #17 Unitronic/JDC-Miller MotorSports
3	(United States) Laguna Seca	**(Canada) Jesse Lazare** **(United States) Michael de Quesada**	(United States) Chris Miller (South Africa) Mikey Taylor
4	(United States) Mid-Ohio	**(United States) #88 Archangel Motorsports**	(United States) #76 Bryan Herta Autosport with Curb-Agajanian
4	(United States) Mid-Ohio	**(United States) Todd Coleman** **(United States) Aaron Telitz**	(United States) Preston Brown (Belgium) Denis Dupont
5	(United States) Watkins Glen	**(United States) #46 Team TGM**	(United States) #17 Unitronic/JDC-Miller MotorSports
5	(United States) Watkins Glen	**(United States) Matt Plumb** **(United States) Paul Holton**	(United States) Chris Miller (South Africa) Mikey Taylor
6	(Canada) Mosport	**(United States) #28 RennSport1**	(United States) #33 Bryan Herta Autosport with Curb-Agajanian
6	(Canada) Mosport	**(United States) Trent Hindman** **(United Kingdom) Stevan McAleer**	(United States) Harry Gottsacker (Canada) Robert Wickens
7	(United States) Road America	**(United States) #28 RennSport1**	(United States) #5 KMW Motorsports with TMR Engineering
7	(United States) Road America	**(United States) Trent Hindman** **(United Kingdom) Stevan McAleer**	(United States) Tim Lewis Jr. (United States) William Tally
8	(United States) Virginia	**(United States) #38 BGB Motorsports**	(Canada) #93 Montreal Motorsport Group
8	(United States) Virginia	**(Canada) Thomas Collingwood** **(United States) Spencer Pumpelly**	(Canada) Karl Wittmer (Japan) Daijiro Yoshihara
9	(United States) Indianapolis	**(United States) #39 CarBahn with Peregrine Racing**	(United States) #98 Bryan Herta Autosport with Curb-Agajanian
9	(United States) Indianapolis	**(United States) Sean McAlister** **(United States) Jeff Westphal**	(United States) Mason Filippi (Canada) Mark Wilkins
10	(United States) Road Atlanta	**(United States) #91 Kellymoss with Riley**	(United States) #98 Bryan Herta Autosport with Curb-Agajanian
10	(United States) Road Atlanta	**(United States) Michael McCarthy** **(United States) Riley Dickinson**	(United States) Mason Filippi (Canada) Mark Wilkins

== Championship Standings ==
=== Points system ===
Championship points are awarded in each class at the finish of each event. Points are awarded based on finishing positions in the race as shown in the chart below.

Position	1	2	3	4	5	6	7	8	9	10	11	12	13	14	15	16	17	18	19	20	21	22	23	24	25	26	27	28	29	30+
Race	350	320	300	280	260	250	240	230	220	210	200	190	180	170	160	150	140	130	120	110	100	90	80	70	60	50	40	30	20	10

=== GS Drivers' Championship ===
Pos.	Drivers	DAY (United States)	SEB (United States)	LGA (United States)	MOH (United States)	WGL (United States)	MOS (Canada)	ELK (United States)	VIR (United States)	IMS (United States)	ATL (United States)	Points
1	(United States) Matt Plumb	3	4	6	2	1	3	11	14	4	**2**	2770
2	(United States) Trent Hindman (United Kingdom) Stevan McAleer	7	19	2	9	**11**	1	1	**2**	**9**	6	2590
3	(United States) Paul Holton		4	6	2	1	3	11	14	4	**2**	2470
4	(United States) Rory van der Steur	11	2	5	22	4	2	3	16	15	4	2360
5	(United States) Dillon Machavern (United States) Robert Megennis	4	14	9	6	2	12	9	11	3	10	2360
6	(United States) Riley Dickinson (United States) Michael McCarthy	1	10	7	12	10	14	19	4	8	1	2350
7	(United States) Bryce Ward	2	22	3	3	6	23	8	8	2	18	2250
8	(United States) Todd Coleman (United States) Aaron Telitz	19	26	10	1	3	7	2	6	19	5	2220
9	(United States) Robby Foley (United States) Francis Selldorff	5	6	13	20	7	5	7	10	6	13	2180
10	(United States) Frank DePew (United Kingdom) Robin Liddell	9	1	12	5	15	8	12	7	20	9	2170
11	(United States) Sean McAlister (United States) Jeff Westphal	**23**	9	17	24	5	4	6	13	1	3	2130
12	(Canada) Daniel Morad	2	22	3	3	6	23	8	8		18	1930
13	(Canada) Jesse Lazare (United States) Michael de Quesada	6	**13**	**1**	**18**	16	9	**10**	12	7		1920
14	(United States) Luca Mars (United States) Bob Michaelian	8	23	14	8	19	11	4	3	12	19	1920
15	(United States) Jenson Altzman	15	3	21	11	17	17	5	9	10	20	1840
16	(Puerto Rico) Sebastian Carazo	18	12	11	13	12	16	18	18	11	14	1650
17	(United States) Greg Liefooghe (United States) Sean Quinlan	22	17	18	14	21	20	23	5	14	7	1490
18	(United States) Ted Giovanis (United States) Hugh Plumb	14	18	20	16	18	19	14	15	17	12	1470
19	(United States) Spencer Pumpelly	18	24	24	17	22	21	13	1	16	16	1430
20	(France) Valentin Hasse-Clot	11	2			4		3			4	1380
21	(United States) Michael Cooper; Moisey Uretsky	25	20	16		8	13	21	17	13	8	1380
22	(United States) Michai Stephens (Canada) Jesse Webb	10	7	23	7	9	10	15	DNS			1360
23	(Canada) Thomas Collingwood	18	24	24	17	22		13	1	16	16	1330
24	(United States) Chad McCumbee	15	3	21	11	17	17		9			1260
25	(United States) Kenton Koch (United States) Paul Sparta	13	5	8	23	20		17				1000
26	(United States) Scott Blind				4	13	18	22		18	15	970
27	Nikita Lastochkin	18	12	11	13	12						870
28	(United States) Jackson Lee		21		13		16			11	14	800
29	(United Kingdom) Jack Hawksworth	17		4			**6**	20				780
30	(Australia) Scott Andrews						2		16	5		730
31	(United States) Jaden Conwright			4		**6**		20				640
32	(United States) Gordon Scully	20	21	15				18	18			630
33	(United States) Ken Fukuda	DNS		25†	19	14		16	19†			620
34	(United States) Andrew Davis	9			5		18					610
35	(United States) Brady Behrman					13				18	15	470
36	(United States) Will Lambros	DNS		25†	19	14			19†			470
37	(United States) Austin Krainz	7			9							460
38	(United States) Jake Pedersen	24	11	22		23						440
39	(France) Alexandre Prémat			5						15		420
40	(United States) Nick Shaeffer (United States) Jared Thomas				10		15					370
41	(United States) Rob Ecklin	16	15			25						370
42	(United States) John Paul Southern Jr.				4			22				370
43	(United States) Brady Golan	1										350
44	(Switzerland) Philip Ellis									2		320
45	(United States) Kris Wilson	14			16							320
46	(United States) Ramin Abdolvahabi	16	15									310
47	(United States) Owen Trinkler	3										300
48	(Bulgaria) Vesko Kozarov	24	11									270
49	(Netherlands) Jeroen Bleekemolen	18			17							270
50	(Canada) Gavin Sanders							5				260
51	(United States) Dan Knox									5		260
52	(United States) Jason Hart (United States) Matt Travis		8									230
53	(United States) Brandon Kidd	16				24						220
54	(United States) Nate Cicero									10		210
55	(United States) Tom Long					24					17	210
56	(United States) Dominic Starkweather	11										200
57	(Colombia) Gabby Chaves (United States) Zach Veach										11	200
58	(United States) Kevin Conway (United States) John Geesbreght (United States) Corey Lewis	12										190
59	(United Kingdom) Amir Haleem (United States) Brian Lock		25	19								180
60	(Netherlands) Kay van Berlo			22		23						170
61	(United States) Mat Pombo			15								160
62	(United States) Vin Barletta (United States) Joe Dalton (United States) Patrick Gallagher				15							160
63	(United States) Josh Green (United States) Marc Miller		16									150
64	(United States) Ross Chastain							16				150
65	(United States) Tyler Maxson	17										140
66	(United States) Jim Jonsin										17	140
67	(Brazil) Celso Neto				19							120
68	(United States) Sam Paley										20	110
69	(United States) John Tecce						21					100
70	(United States) Matt Forbush (United States) Nick Galante (United States) Mark Kvamme	21										100
71	(Japan) Yuichi Nakayama (Canada) Parker Thompson				21							100
72	(Canada) Justin Di Benedetto (Canada) Travis Hill						22					90
73	(Costa Rica) Danny Formal				22							90
74	(United States) John Potter					25						60
75	(United States) Terry Borcheller (United States) Ken Goldberg (United States) Catesby Jones	26										50
76	(United States) Corey Heim (United States) John Hunter Nemechek (United States) Bubba Wallace	27†										40
77	(United States) Carter Fartuch	DNS										0

Colour	Result
Gold	Winner
Silver	Second place
Bronze	Third place
Green	Points classification
Blue	Non-points classification
Blue	Non-classified finish (NC)
Purple	Retired, not classified (Ret)
Red	Did not qualify (DNQ)
Red	Did not pre-qualify (DNPQ)
Black	Disqualified (DSQ)
White	Did not start (DNS)
White	Withdrew (WD)
White	Race cancelled (C)
Blank	Did not practice (DNP)
Blank	Did not arrive (DNA)
Blank	Excluded (EX)

**Bold** - Pole position

Italics - Fastest lap

- †: Post-event penalty. Car moved to back of class.

=== TCR Drivers' Championship ===
Pos.	Drivers	DAY (United States)	SEB (United States)	LGA (United States)	MOH (United States)	WGL (United States)	MOS (Canada)	ELK (United States)	VIR (United States)	IMS (United States)	ATL (United States)	Points
1	(United States) Chris Miller (South Africa) Mikey Taylor	1	1	1	3	1	8	4	7	3	6	3000
2	(United States) Mason Filippi (Canada) Mark Wilkins	3	6	2	12	4	6	2	4	1	1	2890
3	(United States) Harry Gottsacker (Canada) Robert Wickens	**12**	**3**	3	4	2	**1**	7	3	2	4	2880
4	(United States) Preston Brown (Belgium) Denis Dupont	2	4	8	1	3	3	10	9	11	2	2730
5	(Canada) Karl Wittmer (Japan) Daijiro Yoshihara	7	8	6	**5**	8	2	**3**	1	**8**	3	2710
6	(United States) William Tally (United States) Tim Lewis Jr.	13	11	4	2	12	9	1	5	5	5	2520
7	(United States) Taylor Hagler (United States) Bryson Morris	8	9	9	8	5	4	6	**6**	4	**8**	2450
8	(United States) Tyler Gonzalez	10	7	7	14	10	10	8	2	10	11	2240
9	(United States) Morgan Burkhard	11	13†	12	9	14	10	8	2	10	11	2130
10	(United States) Eddie Gou (United States) Eduardo Gou	17	10	11	15	6	DNS	9	8	9	7	1870
11	(United States) Gavin Ernstone	9	5	5		7		5		12		1430
12	(Canada) Louis-Philippe Montour	15	12†	**10**	7	**9**	7	DNS				1260
13	(United States) Jon Morley	9	5	5		7		5				1240
14	(Puerto Rico) Bryan Ortiz	15	12†	**10**	7	**9**						1020
15	(United States) Chad Gilsinger	14	14†		6	13				7		1010
16	(Canada) Dean Baker (Canada) Sam Baker				10		5		10		10	890
17	(Puerto Rico) Victor Gonzalez Jr.	10	7	7	14							860
18	(United States) Tyler Chambers	14			6	13				7		840
19	(United States) Tazio Ottis (Hong Kong) Daniel Wu	5			11	11				13	DNS	840
20	(United States) Chase Jones		13†	12	9	14						760
21	(United States) Larry Pegram (United States) Riley Pegram							12		6	9	660
22	(United States) Tom O'Gorman	4			13					12		650
23	(United States) Steve Eich	14	14†		6							590
24	(United States) Andy Lally (United States) Nick Tucker		2					11				520
25	(United States) Eric Rockwell	4			13							460
26	(United States) Jacob Deily	6			16							400
27	(United States) Clayton Williams	16				10						360
28	(Canada) Nick Looijmans	2										320
29	(United States) Douglas Oakley	4										280
30	(United States) Jordan Wisely	6										250
31	(Canada) Jonathan Brel						7	DNS				240
32	(Argentina) Julián Santero	11										200
33	(United States) Alex Rockwell				13							180
34	(United States) Elliott Budzinski				14							170
35	(Canada) James Vance				16							150
36	(United States) Colton Reynolds	16										150

Colour	Result
Gold	Winner
Silver	Second place
Bronze	Third place
Green	Points classification
Blue	Non-points classification
Blue	Non-classified finish (NC)
Purple	Retired, not classified (Ret)
Red	Did not qualify (DNQ)
Red	Did not pre-qualify (DNPQ)
Black	Disqualified (DSQ)
White	Did not start (DNS)
White	Withdrew (WD)
White	Race cancelled (C)
Blank	Did not practice (DNP)
Blank	Did not arrive (DNA)
Blank	Excluded (EX)

**Bold** - Pole position

Italics - Fastest lap

- †: Post-event penalty. Car moved to back of class.
