= Gresham Wagner =

American racing driver

- Born: August 21, 1997 (age 29) Newport News, Virginia, U.S.

Mazda MX-5 Cup career
- Debut season: 2018
- Current team: McCumbee McAleer Racing
- Car number: 5
- Former teams: Spark Performance; Sick Sideways Racing

Championship titles
- 2021 2022 2024 2024: Mazda MX-5 Cup; TC America Series; Mazda MX-5 Cup; Toyota GR Cup
- Statistics up to date as of January 8, 2026.

Gresham Wagner (born August 21, 1997) is an American racing driver who competes in the Mazda MX-5 Cup and Toyota GR Cup North America.

Wagner was the 2021 and 2024 champion of the Mazda MX-5 Cup, the 2024 champion of the Toyota GR Cup, as well as the TCA class champion of the TC America Series in 2022.

== Career ==
=== Early career ===
Wagner grew up around racing, watching his father compete at local short tracks before jumping behind the wheel himself at the age of five. At the age of nine, he made his national karting debut, competing as high as the WKA Manufacturer's Cup in 2007. However, Wagner's karting career would be cut short in his early teens, as he was forced to have back surgery as a result of developing scoliosis. Following the surgery, a thoracic-lumbar spinal fusion, he found it too painful and difficult to compete competitively in karting, causing him to step away from the sport. After two years away from racing, he was re-introduced to the sport via the Skip Barber Racing School, and he made plans to compete in the Global MX-5 Cup shortly thereafter.

=== Mazda MX-5 Cup ===
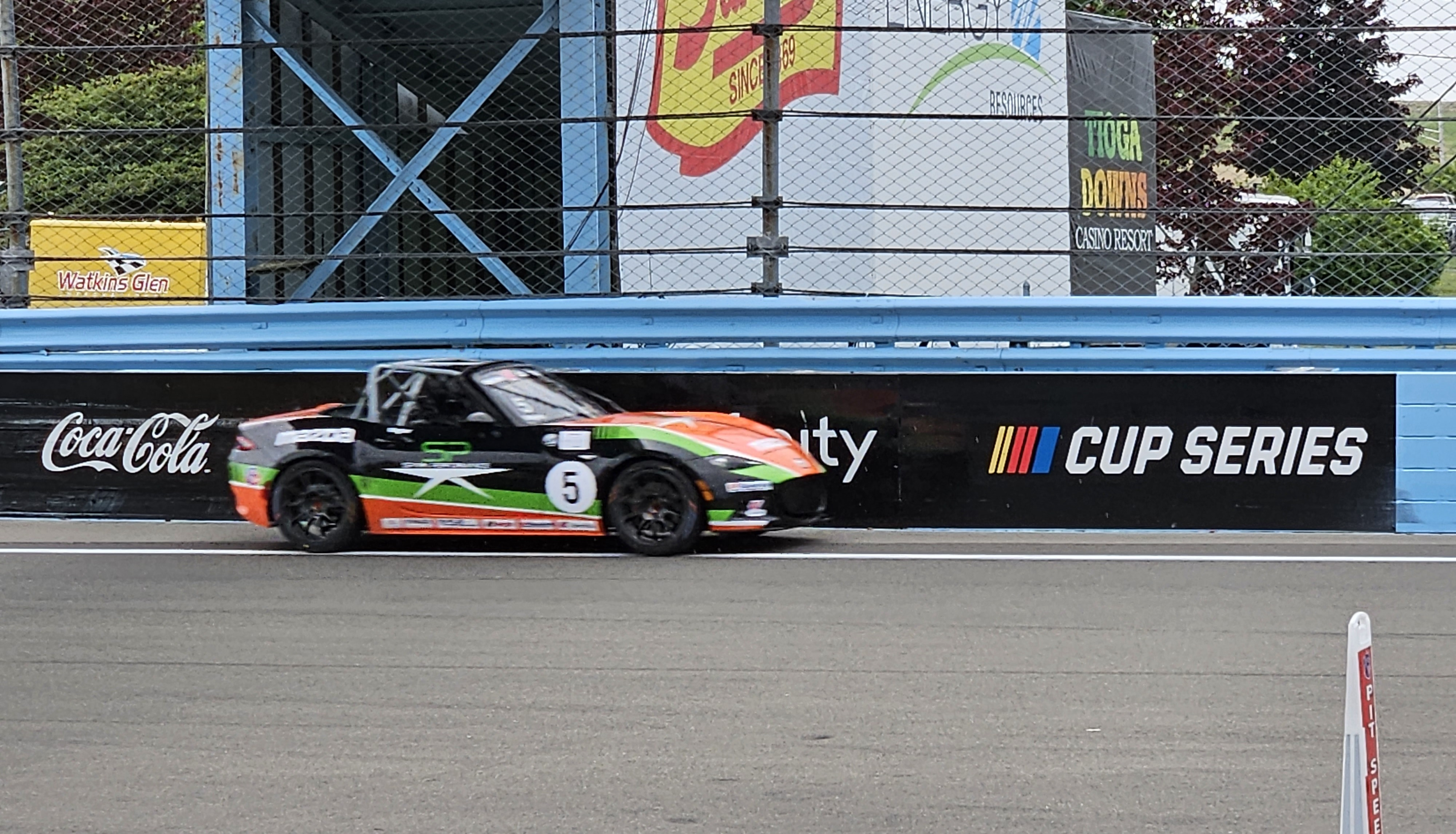
Wagner's Mazda MX-5 Cup car at Watkins Glen in 2023.

In 2018, Wagner began competing in SCCA events with Sick Sideways Racing after acquiring a used Mazda MX-5 Cup car. Wagner was entered in the Touring 4 class of the Hoosier Super Tour, and claimed several race victories over the course of the season – including at Mid-Ohio in June. Wagner ended up second in the T4 championship, five points behind Ross Murray. Later in the season, at Barber Motorsports Park, he made his debut in the Global MX-5 Cup, finishing sixth in his first race. In October, Wagner traveled to Sonoma Raceway to compete in the SCCA Runoffs, taking second in the T4 class behind John Heinricy.

2019 marked Wagner's first full-time season in the MX-5 Cup, and he continued with Sick Sideways Racing. Over the course of the season, he claimed two podiums and two pole positions, finishing the season eighth in the points. For 2020, Wagner swapped teams, joining the newly-formed Spark Performance for the full campaign. That season, he claimed his first series victory at Mid-Ohio, and added another a month later at New Jersey Motorsports Park. At the end of the season, Wagner was fifth in points, collecting a $10,000 payout as a result.

2021 was Wagner's most successful in the series yet. After securing victory in the opening race of the season at Daytona, he became the first repeat victor of the season after taking first in the second race at Sebring. Wagner would close the season with three consecutive victories – a sweep of the weekend at Laguna Seca and an additional race win at Road Atlanta – en route to a title victory. As a result, Wagner earned a $250,000 championship credit.

Wagner naturally aimed for a repeat in 2022, returning to Spark Performance with "more expectation" on himself to back up his 2021 campaign with another strong season. In addition, Wagner competed full-time in the TC America Series in 2022, driving a Subaru BRZ in the TCA class for TechSport Racing. In his familiar Mazda seat, he would claim just one victory during the 2022 season, taking first overall in a rain-shortened race at Mid-Ohio. However, six additional podium finishes meant he finished third in the championship. In TC America, Wagner experienced great success in his first year outside of the Mazda MX-5 Cup. After finishing second and first in his opening weekend of competition, Wagner would go on to win seven of the 14 races in his TCA class, including a sweep of the weekend at Sebring. As a result, Wagner came home with the class title at season's end, ten points ahead of second-placed Carter Fartuch.

2023 saw Wagner once again embark on a dual SRO/IMSA program, this time in the new-for-2023 Toyota GR Cup alongside a continued MX-5 Cup drive. He scored his first victory in the GR Cup at COTA in May, before adding another victory at Road America in August. He scored his final victory of the GR Cup season during the season-finale weekend at Indianapolis, and finished runner-up to champion Tyler Gonzalez in the season-long championship. In the Mazda MX-5 Cup, Wagner claimed two race victories en route to a fifth-place championship finish.

The following season, Wagner mirrored his 2023 effort with a return to both series, although switched teams to McCumbee McAleer Racing and Copeland Motorsports in MX-5 Cup and GR Cup competition respectively. He kicked off the 2024 Mazda MX-5 Cup season with a victory at Daytona, but would be forced to wait until June's round at Mid-Ohio to return to victory lane. Wagner added his third victory of the season during race one at Road Atlanta, and he clinched the series championship with a podium finish the following day. Wagner's 2024 triumph made him the second two-time champion in series history, following Jared Thomas' accomplishment from the year prior. In GR Cup competition, Wagner enjoyed a comfortable championship season, taking victory in ten of the year's 14 races and clinching the driver's championship with two races to spare.

=== Toyota Development Driver (2025–) ===
Following his 2024 GR Cup championship, Wagner was named a Toyota Development Driver for 2025. Consequently, Wagner made the step up to GT4 competition for the season, partnering with fellow Toyota Development Driver Tyler Gonzalez in the GT4 America Series. The partnership united two long-time competitors, with the two having regularly competed against one another in MX-5 and GR Cup competition in the past. Wagner scored his maiden series victory in the lone endurance round of the season at COTA, and the duo proceeded to take additional victories at Barber and Indianapolis. At the end of the season, they sat second in the Silver-class points classification, 40 points behind champions Kevin Boehm and Kenton Koch.

Wagner also continued part-time in MX-5 Cup in 2025, defending his 2024 championship with McCumbee McAleer Racing. He scored one victory over the course of the season, taking overall honors in a lightning-shortened race at Mosport. In August, Wagner, Gonzalez, and fellow development driver Kiko Porto tested a Vasser Sullivan-run Lexus RC F GT3 at Road America.

== Personal life ==
In 2020, Wagner graduated from Christopher Newport University with a degree in business administration. Off of the track, he maintains a full-time career as a business professional in the health information technology field.

== Racing record ==
=== Career summary ===
Season	Series	Team	Races	Wins	Poles	F/Laps	Podiums	Points	Position
2018	SCCA Southeast Majors - Touring 4	Gresham Wagner Racing	8	4	4	5	7	180	1st
2018	SCCA Hoosier Super Tour - Touring 4	Gresham Wagner Racing	6	4	4	4	5	159	2nd
2018	Mazda MX-5 Cup	Sick Sideways Racing	4	0	0	0	0	31	26th
2019	Mazda MX-5 Cup	Sick Sideways Racing	12	0	2	1	2	166	8th
2020	Mazda MX-5 Cup	Spark Performance	12	2	3	1	5	187	5th
2021	Mazda MX-5 Cup	Spark Performance	14	5	6	2	10	4330	1st
2022	Mazda MX-5 Cup	Spark Performance	14	1	0	3	7	3465	3rd
2022	TC America Series - TCA	TechSport Racing	14	7	7	7	10	238	1st
2023	Mazda MX-5 Cup	Spark Performance	14	2	4	3	4	2990	5th
2023	Toyota GR Cup North America	TechSport Racing	13	3	4	4	10	195	2nd
2024	Mazda MX-5 Cup	McCumbee McAleer Racing	14	3	4	2	8	3770	1st
2024	Toyota GR Cup North America	Copeland Motorsports	14	10	6	6	12	297	1st
2025	Mazda MX-5 Cup	McCumbee McAleer Racing	4	0	0	1	1	1990	14th
2025	Mazda MX-5 Cup	RAFA Racing Team by MMR	6	1	1	0	4	1990	14th
2025	GT4 America Series - Silver	TGR RAFA Racing Team	13	3	4	3	7	225	2nd
2026	Mazda MX-5 Cup	JTR Motorsports Engineering							

^{*} Season still in progress.

Sporting positions
Preceded by Michael Carter	Mazda MX-5 Cup; Champion; 2021	Succeeded by Jared Thomas
Preceded by Jared Thomas	Mazda MX-5 Cup; Champion; 2024	Succeeded by Jeremy Fletcher
Preceded by Caleb Bacon	TC America Series; TCA Champion; 2022	Succeeded by Spencer Bucknum
Preceded by Tyler Gonzalez	Toyota GR Cup North America; Champion; 2024	Succeeded by Westin Workman
