= Nathan Nicholson =

Nathan Nicholson may refer to:

- Nathan Nicholson (singer)
- Nathan Nicholson (racing driver)
