= 2026 Mazda MX-5 Cup =

Motor racing competition

The 2026 Whelen Mazda MX-5 Cup presented by Michelin was a single-make motor racing championship, the 22nd season of the Mazda MX-5 Cup and the sixth sanctioned by the International Motor Sports Association (IMSA). The series began on January 21 at Daytona International Speedway, and concluded on October 2 at Michelin Raceway Road Atlanta after 14 rounds.

Jeremy Fletcher was the defending champion, having won the title in 2025.

== Schedule ==
The schedule was announced on July 7, 2025, featuring 14 rounds across seven double-header weekends.

Round		Circuit	Location	Dates	Supporting
1	R1	Daytona International Speedway	Daytona Beach, Florida	January 21–23	IMSA SportsCar Championship
1	R2	Daytona International Speedway	Daytona Beach, Florida	January 21–23	IMSA SportsCar Championship
2	R3	Streets of St. Petersburg	St. Petersburg, Florida	February 27–March 1	IndyCar Series
2	R4	Streets of St. Petersburg	St. Petersburg, Florida	February 27–March 1	IndyCar Series
3	R5	Mid-Ohio Sports Car Course	Lexington, Ohio	June 5–7	Michelin Pilot Challenge
3	R6	Mid-Ohio Sports Car Course	Lexington, Ohio	June 5–7	Michelin Pilot Challenge
4	R7	Canadian Tire Motorsports Park	Bowmanville, Ontario, Canada	July 10–12	IMSA SportsCar Championship
4	R8	Canadian Tire Motorsports Park	Bowmanville, Ontario, Canada	July 10–12	IMSA SportsCar Championship
5	R9	Virginia International Raceway	Alton, Virginia	August 20–23	IMSA SportsCar Championship
5	R10	Virginia International Raceway	Alton, Virginia	August 20–23	IMSA SportsCar Championship
6	R11	Indianapolis Motor Speedway	Speedway, Indiana	September 18–20	IMSA SportsCar Championship
6	R12	Indianapolis Motor Speedway	Speedway, Indiana	September 18–20	IMSA SportsCar Championship
7	R13	Michelin Raceway Road Atlanta	(Georgia (U.S. state)) Braselton, Georgia	September 30–October 2	IMSA SportsCar Championship
7	R14	Michelin Raceway Road Atlanta	(Georgia (U.S. state)) Braselton, Georgia	September 30–October 2	IMSA SportsCar Championship

== Entry list ==
All competitors utilize the Mazda MX-5 Cup car, modified to their homologated racing specification by Flis Performance.

Team	No.	Driver	Class	Rounds
BSI Racing	09	(Canada) Damon Ockey		2–4
BSI Racing	6	(United States) Spencer Bucknum		5–7
BSI Racing	7	(United States) Tristan McKee	R	1–3, 6–7
BSI Racing	7	(Mexico) Helio Meza		4
BSI Racing	7	(United States) Lanie Buice		5
BSI Racing	15	(United States) Massimo Sunseri	R	3–4
BSI Racing	28	(United States) Gianni Maiuro	R	5–7
BSI Racing	32	(United States) Christian Hodneland		2–6
BSI Racing	44	(United States) Bobby Gossett		All
BSI Racing	57	(Spain) Tyler Gonzalez (Note: Gonzalez is an American-Spanish driver competing under a Spanish licence.)		1
BSI Racing	67	(United States) Amilio DiLauro	R	3
BSI Racing	72	(United States) Ethan Goulart		1–2
BSI Racing	77	(United States) Ellie Gossett	R	All
BSI Racing	80	(United States) Ethan Tyler		1–3, 6
BSI Racing	86	(United States) Farhan Siddiqi		1
BSI Racing	95	(United States) Julian DaCosta		1, 3–7
BSI Racing	95	(United States) James Vance		2
Wheels America Racing	3	(United States) Max Stallone	R	All
Wheels America Racing	97	(United States) Race Oliver	R	7
Wheels America Racing	98	(United States) Logan Stretch	R	All
JTR Motorsports Engineering	5	(United States) Gresham Wagner		1–5
JTR Motorsports Engineering	8	(United States) Justin Gravett	R	1–5, 7
JTR Motorsports Engineering	26	(United States) Peter Atwater		1–3, 5–7
JTR Motorsports Engineering	34	(United States) John Salerno	R	All
JTR Motorsports Engineering	46	(United States) Christopher Allen	R	1
JTR Motorsports Engineering	46	(United States) Michael O'Dell	R	3
JTR Motorsports Engineering	66	(United States) Jameson Riley	R	1–2, 7
JTR Motorsports Engineering	69	(United States) Glenn McGee		All
JTR Motorsports Engineering	81	(United States) Chris Hutter	R	1–3
JTR Motorsports Engineering	82	(United States) Woody Heimann		1, 3
JTR Motorsports Engineering	96	(United States) Jared Thomas		All
Advanced Autosports	9	(United States) Vaughn Mishko	R	1–4
Advanced Autosports	11	(United States) Matt Novak	R	All
Advanced Autosports	24	(United States) William Wallis	R	5
Advanced Autosports	55	(United States) Cam Ebben	R	All
Advanced Autosports	56	(United States) Nathan Nicholson		All
Advanced Autosports	31	(United States) Ethan Lampe	R	1–4
Hendricks Motorsports	31	(United States) Ethan Lampe	R	5–7
Hendricks Motorsports	12	(United States) Noah Harmon		1, 4–5, 7
Hendricks Motorsports	21	(United States) Westin Workman		1
Hendricks Motorsports	21	(New Zealand) Earl Bamber		2
Hendricks Motorsports	21	(United Kingdom) Luke Pullen	R	3, 6
Hendricks Motorsports	21	(United States) Aidan Shimbashi		4
McCumbee McAleer Racing	15	(United States) Eli Dysart	R	6
McCumbee McAleer Racing	17	(United States) Joe Rainey		1, 3
McCumbee McAleer Racing	18	(United States) Seth Tozer	R	5–6
McCumbee McAleer Racing	22	(United States) Jeremy Fletcher		All
McCumbee McAleer Racing	23	(United States) Justin Adakonis		All
McCumbee McAleer Racing	30	(United States) Joey Rainey		1
McCumbee McAleer Racing	51	(United States) Will Robinson		1–3, 5–7
McCumbee McAleer Racing	51	(United States) Carlton MacFarland		4
McCumbee McAleer Racing	38	(France) Sébastien Bourdais		2
McCumbee McAleer Racing	38	(Canada) Marcello Paniccia	R	3–6
Saito Motorsports Group	19	(Canada) Marcello Paniccia	R	1–2
Saito Motorsports Group	19	(United States) Lincoln Larson	R	5
Saito Motorsports Group	19	(United States) Gavin Vaughan	R	7
Saito Motorsports Group	29	(United States) Ethan Goulart		5, 7
Saito Motorsports Group	39	(United States) Michelle Squirek	R	5
AAG Racing	25	(Mexico) Fernando Luque	R	1–2
AAG Racing	60	(United States) Chuck Mactutus	R	1–2
Spark Performance	33	(United States) Alex Bachoura		1–2
Spark Performance	33	(United States) Capers Zentmeyer		5
Spark Performance	48	(United States) Frankie Barroso	R	All
Spark Performance	50	(United States) Grant West		1–5
Spark Performance	89	(United States) Ryan Leach	R	1–5
Spark Performance	84	(United States) Ruben Caceres Jr.		1–2
Caceres Racing	88	(United States) Ruben Caceres Jr.		3
Rocksteady Racing	40	(United States) Brian Dombroski	R	All
Parker Delong Racing	41	(United States) Jenson Mechelke	R	5–7
Parker Delong Racing	42	(United States) Parker DeLong		All
Parker Delong Racing	43	(United States) Charlotte Traynor		All
Parker Delong Racing	45	(United States) Mark Brummond		5
JDH Racing	71	(United States) Ben Jacobs	R	1–4
JDH Racing	99	(United States) Ethan Jacobs	R	All

R = Eligible for Rookie's Championship

== Race results ==
Round		Circuit	Pole position	Fastest lap	Winning driver
1	R1	Daytona	#22 McCumbee McAleer Racing	#69 JTR Motorsports Engineering	#12 Hendricks Motorsports
1	R1	Daytona	(United States) Jeremy Fletcher	(United States) Glenn McGee	(United States) Noah Harmon
1	R2	Daytona	#69 JTR Motorsports Engineering	#5 JTR Motorsports Engineering	#22 McCumbee McAleer Racing
1	R2	Daytona	(United States) Glenn McGee	(United States) Gresham Wagner	(United States) Jeremy Fletcher
2	R1	St. Petersburg	#11 Advanced Autosports	#96 JTR Motorsports Engineering	#44 BSI Racing
2	R1	St. Petersburg	(United States) Matt Novak	(United States) Jared Thomas	(United States) Bobby Gossett
2	R2	St. Petersburg	#23 McCumbee McAleer Racing	#96 JTR Motorsports Engineering	#23 McCumbee McAleer Racing
2	R2	St. Petersburg	(United States) Justin Adakonis	(United States) Jared Thomas	(United States) Justin Adakonis
3	R1	Mid-Ohio	#23 McCumbee McAleer Racing	#95 BSI Racing	#22 McCumbee McAleer Racing
3	R1	Mid-Ohio	(United States) Justin Adakonis	(United States) Julian DaCosta	(United States) Jeremy Fletcher
3	R2	Mid-Ohio	#95 BSI Racing	#56 Advanced Motorsports	#23 McCumbee McAleer Racing
3	R2	Mid-Ohio	(United States) Julian DaCosta	(United States) Nathan Nicholson	(United States) Justin Adakonis
4	R1	Mosport	#11 Advanced Autosports	#42 Parker DeLong Racing	#44 BSI Racing
4	R1	Mosport	(United States) Matt Novak	(United States) Parker DeLong	(United States) Bobby Gosstt
4	R2	Mosport	#11 Advanced Autosports	#9 Advanced Autosports	#31 Hendricks Motorsports
4	R2	Mosport	(United States) Matt Novak	(United States) Vaughn Mishko	(United States) Ethan Lampe
5	R1	Virginia	#24 Advanced Autosports	#96 JTR Motersports Engineering	#23 McCumbee McAleer Racing
5	R1	Virginia	(United States) William Wallis	(United States) Jared Thomas	(United States) Justin Adakonis
5	R2	Virginia	#22 McCumbee McAleer Racing	#12 Hendricks Motersport	#12 Hendricks Motersport
5	R2	Virginia	(United States) Jeremy Fletcher	(United States) Noah Harmon	(United States) Noah Harmon
6	R1	Indianapolis	#56 Advanced Motersport	#31 Hendricks Motersports	#44 BSI Racing
6	R1	Indianapolis	(United States) Nathan Nicholson	(United States) Ethan Lampe	(United States) Bobbie Gosstt
6	R2	Indianapolis	#96 JTR Motersports Engineering	#56 Advanced Motersport	#56 Advanced Motersport
6	R2	Indianapolis	(United States) Jared Thomas	(United States) Nathan Nicholson	(United States) Nathan Nicholson
7	R1	Road Atlanta			
7	R2	Road Atlanta			

== Championship standings ==
=== Points system ===
Championship points are awarded at the finish of each event according to the chart below.

Position	1	2	3	4	5	6	7	8	9	10	11	12	13	14	15	16	17	18	19	20	21	22	23	24	25	26	27	28	29	30+
Points	350	320	300	280	260	250	240	230	220	210	200	190	180	170	160	150	140	130	120	110	100	90	80	70	60	50	40	30	20	10

=== Driver's championship ===
IMSA recognizes driver champions based on the total number of championship points earned during the season.

Pos.	Driver	DAY		STP		MDO		MOS		VIR	IND	ATL	Bonus	Points
1	(United States) Justin Adakonis	2	10	35	**1**	**5**	1	3	4				30	2110
2	(United States) Bobby Gossett	3	33	1	3	11	21	1	2				20	1950
3	(United States) Jared Thomas	4	35	2	2	2	35	14	3				20	1750
4	(United States) Frankie Barroso R	11	32	5	5	12	6	8	6				0	1670
5	(United States) Ethan Jacobs R	14	11	10	35	4	2	9	29				0	1440
6	(United States) Nathan Nicholson	7	31	18	6	9	7	24	7				10	1430
7	(Canada) Marcello Paniccia R	8	23	25	20	8	19	2	9				0	1400
8	(United States) Cam Ebben R	22	20	19	14	26	5	6	8				0	1310
9	(United States) Jeremy Fletcher	**42**	1	4	38	1	18	27	25				30	1260
10	(United States) Parker DeLong	9	36	15	21	6	27	4	16				10	1250
11	(United States) John Salerno R	20	18	13	15	16	11	7	30				0	1210
12	(United States) Justin Gravett R	44	12	23	19	18	9	12	10				0	1180
13	(United States) Gresham Wagner	41	5	9	7	3	30	30	23				20	1170
14	(United States) Ethan Lampe R	29	4	33	40	7	12	31	1				10	1120
15	(United States) Matt Novak R	34	16	**3**	39	20	4	**25**	**22**				20	1040
16	(United States) Tristan McKee	17	6	7	10	17	29						0	1020
17	(United States) Ethan Tyler	12	8	21	12	10	28						0	980
18	(United States) Julian DaCosta	5	43			21	**3**	20	21				20	900
19	(United States) Glenn McGee	16	**37**	14	36	19	33	11	11				20	900
20	(United States) Grant West	10	38	6	27	13	13						0	890
21	(United States) Noah Harmon	1	41					5	13				0	800
22	(United States) Max Stallone R	45	26	17	18	15	14	28	26				0	770
23	(United States) Logan Stretch R	43	21	38	30	38	10	13	12				0	740
24	(United States) Will Robinson	23	13	12	31	25	15						0	700
25	(United States) Ryan Leach R	35	22	16	32	36	25	19	14				0	630
26	(United States) Vaughn Mishko R	15	30	39	16	37	34	10	28				10	620
27	(United States) Ellie Gossett R	32	24	40	29	24	22	15	18				0	580
28	(United States) Charlotte Traynor R	40	25	28	26	34	23	18	15				0	570
29	(United States) Christian Hodneland			20	13	27	31	16	27				0	560
30	(United States) Brian Dombroski R	33	29	24	23	30	17	23	20				0	550
31	(United States) Ruben Caceres Jr.	19	3	37	25	35	37						0	530
32	(United States) Ethan Goulart	37	9	32	11								0	460
33	(United States) Westin Workman	6	14										0	420
34	(United States) Alex Bachoura	25	15	29	17								0	420
35	(United States) Jameson Riley	27	45	11	22								0	370
36	(United States) Massimo Sunseri					22	24	17	24				0	370
37	(Spain) Tyler Gonzalez	36	2										10	340
38	(United States) James Vance			22	8								0	340
39	(United States) Chuck Mactutus R	24	7	34	37								0	330
40	(Mexico) Helio Meza							26	5				0	310
41	(United States) Amilio DiLauro					23	8						0	310
42	(Canada) Damon Ockey			36	33	31	26	21	19				0	300
43	(Mexico) Fernando Luque R	21	17	31	34								0	270
44	(United States) Aidan Shimbashi R							22	17				0	230
45	(United States) Christopher Allen R	13	39										0	190
46	(United Kingdom) Luke Pullen					14	32						0	180
47	(United States) Michael O’Dell					28	16						0	180
48	(United States) Peter Atwater	18	28	DNS	DNS	DNS	DNS						0	160
49	(United States) Woody Heimann	38	44			29	20						0	150
50	(United States) Ben Jacobs R	39	34	26	28	32	36	DNS	DNS				0	150
51	(United States) Chris Hutter R	30	40	30	24	DNS	DNS						0	140
52	(United States) Joey Rainey	31	19										0	130
53	(United States) Joe Rainey	28	27			33	DNS						0	80
54	(United States) Farhan Siddiqi	26	42										0	60
55	(United States) Carlton MacFarlane R							29	DNS				0	20
Guest drivers ineligible to score points
	(New Zealand) Earl Bamber			8	4									
	(France) Sébastien Bourdais			27	9									
Pos.	Driver	DAY		STP		MDO		MOS		VIR	IND	ATL	Bonus	Points

Colour	Result
Gold	Winner
Silver	Second place
Bronze	Third place
Green	Points classification
Blue	Non-points classification
Blue	Non-classified finish (NC)
Purple	Retired, not classified (Ret)
Red	Did not qualify (DNQ)
Red	Did not pre-qualify (DNPQ)
Black	Disqualified (DSQ)
White	Did not start (DNS)
White	Withdrew (WD)
White	Race cancelled (C)
Blank	Did not practice (DNP)
Blank	Did not arrive (DNA)
Blank	Excluded (EX)

**Bold** - Pole position

Italics - Fastest lap

Underline = Most Laps Led

†: Post-event penalty. Car moved to back of class.
