= Nate Cicero =

American racing driver (born 2004)

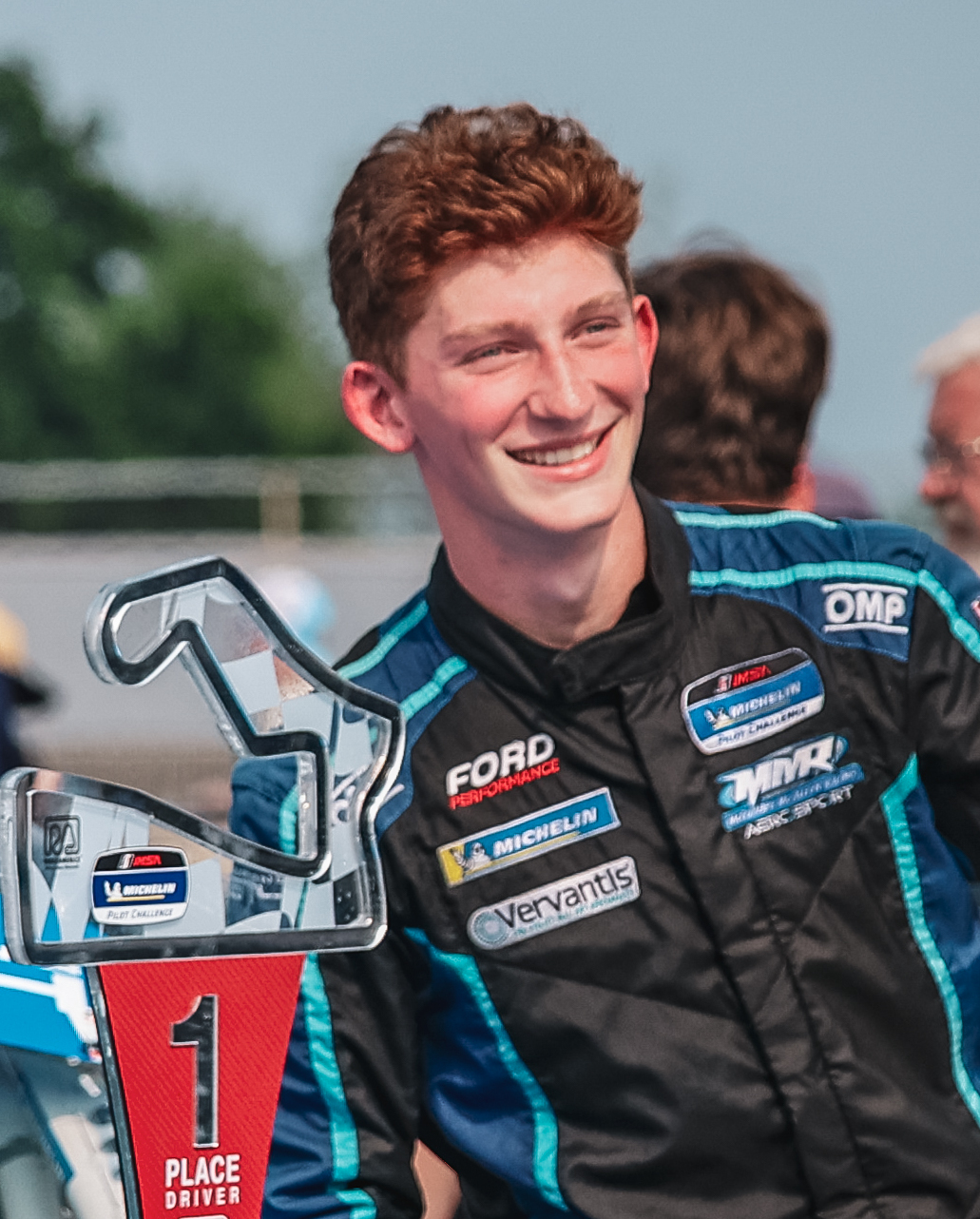
- Cicero after winning the 2025 Road America 120
- Nationality: (United States) American
- Born: November 23, 2004 (age 21) Pound Ridge, New York, U.S.

Michelin Pilot Challenge career
- Debut season: 2024
- Current team: McCumbee McAleer Racing
- Categorisation: FIA Silver
- Car number: 13
- Starts: 13
- Wins: 1
- Podiums: 4
- Poles: 5
- Fastest laps: 0
- Best finish: 11th in 2026

Previous series
- 2023–2025: Mazda MX-5 Cup

Nathaniel Cicero (born November 23, 2004) is an American racing driver. A Mazda MX-5 Cup graduate and Ford Racing junior, Cicero was the Michelin Pilot Challenge points leader for McCumbee McAleer Racing when he stepped back from racing in August 2026.

== Career ==
Cicero began racing indoor karts at the age of ten, before moving to outdoor karts two years later and competing until 2023 under Stevan McAleer's guidance. During his time in karting, Cicero most notably won the SKUSA Winter Series in KA 100 Senior in 2020, before taking the ROK Vegas crown in the ROK Senior class the following year.

In 2021, Cicero partook in the end-of-year Spec MX-5 Shootout, which he won alongside Westin Workman. In 2022, Cicero raced in the Spec MX-5 Challenge Series, finishing 11th in points with a win to his name, before winning the Mazda MX-5 Cup Shootout in November. In 2023, Cicero moved up to the Mazda MX-5 Cup with McCumbee McAleer Racing, winning at VIR to secure the rookie title and a sixth-place points finish. In 2024, Cicero continued to race in the Mazda MX-5 Cup, scoring wins at Daytona and Mosport, as well as his first pole position at Road Atlanta to take fourth in points. Cicero also raced with McCumbee McAleer in the IMSA Ford Mustang Challenge, but pulled out of the series after two rounds following a rollover crash in race one at Watkins Glen caused by a stuck-open throttle. Late in the year, Cicero made his Michelin Pilot Challenge debut with the team at Indianapolis, qualifying third and finishing tenth alongside Jenson Altzman.

Despite scoring a record seven pole positions, Cicero had his worst Mazda MX-5 Cup season in 2025, as he switched from Saito Motorsport Group back to McCumbee McAleer Racing mid-season, taking a podium for each team and finishing eighth in points. In parallel, Cicero also raced on a part-time basis in GT4 America, most notably taking a pair of Silver podiums for Dome Motorsport at VIR. Towards the end of the year, Cicero returned to the Michelin Pilot Challenge with MMR, qualifying on pole three times in a row and winning at Road America alongside Altzman.

In 2026, Cicero graduated to Michelin Pilot Challenge full-time with McCumbee McAleer Racing, sharing a Ford Mustang GT4 with Robert Noaker in the GS class, as a new addition to the Ford Racing Driver Development Team. Starting off the season with poles at Daytona and Laguna Seca, Cicero stood on the podium three times to take a 100-point lead in the championship after Road America. Days later, on August 6, Cicero announced he was stepping back from racing "to focus on personal matters". MMR and Ford severed ties with Cicero effective immediately.

== Karting record ==
=== Karting career summary ===
Season	Series	Team	Position
2020	SKUSA Winter Series – KA 100 Senior		
2021	ROK Vegas – ROK Senior		1st
2021	SKUSA SuperNationals – X30 Senior		16th
2023	SKUSA Pro Tour – X30 Senior		24th
2023	ROK Vegas – ROK Pro GP		20th
2023	SKUSA SuperNationals – KA 100 Senior		8th

== Racing record ==
=== Racing career summary ===
Season	Series	Team	Races	Wins	Poles	F/Laps	Podiums	Points	Position
2022	Spec MX-5 Challenge Series			1				167	11th
2022	Spec MX-5 Challenge Series – West			1				125	**3rd**
2023	Mazda MX-5 Cup	McCumbee McAleer Racing	14	1	0	0	2	2990	6th
2024	Mazda MX-5 Cup	McCumbee McAleer Racing	14	2	1	0	5	3670	4th
2024	IMSA Ford Mustang Challenge – Dark Horse	McCumbee McAleer Racing	3	0	0	0	0	410	29th
2024	Michelin Pilot Challenge – GS	McCumbee McAleer Racing with Aerosport	1	0	0	0	0	210	54th
2025	Mazda MX-5 Cup	Saito Motorsport Group	6	0	3	1	1	2610	8th
2025	Mazda MX-5 Cup	McCumbee McAleer Racing	8	0	4	0	1	2610	8th
2025	GT4 America Series – Pro-Am	Fast Track Racing	3	0	0	0	0	14	11th
2025	GT4 America Series – Silver	Dome Motorsport	2	0	0	0	2	36	10th
2025	Michelin Pilot Challenge – GS	McCumbee McAleer Racing with Aerosport	5	1	3	0	1	1160	24th
2026	Michelin Pilot Challenge – GS	McCumbee McAleer Racing	7	0	2	0	3	1810	11th

* Season still in progress.
^{†} As Cicero was a guest driver, he was ineligible for points.

=== Complete Mazda MX-5 Cup results ===
(key) (Races in bold indicate pole position. Races in italics indicate fastest race lap in class. Results are overall/class)

Year	Team	1	2	3	4	5	6	7	8	9	10	11	12	13	14	Rank	Points
2023	McCumbee McAleer Racing	DAY; 1; 26	DAY; 2; 8	STP; 1; 9	STP; 2; 19	LGA; 1; 5	LGA; 2; 4	WGL; 1; 12	WGL; 2; 19	ELK; 1; 4	ELK; 2; 6	VIR; 1; 1	VIR; 2; 3	ATL; 1; 18	ATL; 2; 10	6th	2990
2024	McCumbee McAleer Racing	DAY; 1; 28	DAY; 2; 1	SEB; 1; 4	SEB; 2; 15	LAG; 1; 3	LAG; 2; 7	MOH; 1; 4	MOH; 2; 3	MOS; 1; 4	MOS; 2; 1	VIR; 1; 6	VIR; 2; 5	ATL; 1; 5	**ATL**; **2**; 2	4th	3760
2025	Saito Motorsport Group	**DAY**; **1**; 30	**DAY**; **2**; 7	STP; 1; 22	STP; 2; 5	BAR; 1; 2	**BAR**; **2**; 12									8th	2610
2025	McCumbee McAleer Racing							**MOH**; **1**; 31	MOH; 2; 4	**MOS**; **1**; 10	**MOS**; **2**; 3	VIR; 1; 5	VIR; 2; 26	**ATL**; **1**; 5	ATL; 2; 28	8th	2610

=== Complete Michelin Pilot Challenge results ===
(key) (Races in bold indicate pole position) (Races in italics indicate fastest lap)

Year	Entrant	Class	Make	1	2	3	4	5	6	7	8	9	10	Rank	Points
2024	McCumbee McAleer Racing with Aerosport	Grand Sport	Ford Mustang GT4 (2024)	DAY	SEB	LGA	MOH	WGL	MOS	ELK	VIR	IMS; 10	ATL	54th	210
2025	McCumbee McAleer Racing with Aerosport	Grand Sport	Ford Mustang GT4 (2024)	DAY	SEB	LGA	MOH	WGL	**MOS**; 5	**ELK**; 1	**VIR**; 11	IMS; 7	ATL; 20	24th	1160
2026	McCumbee McAleer Racing	Grand Sport	Ford Mustang GT4 (2024)	**DAY**; 6	SEB; 8	**LGA**; 3	MOH; 10	WGL; 2	MOS; 3	ELK; 11	VIR	IMS	ATL	11th	1810
