= Jagger Jones =

American racing driver (born 2002)

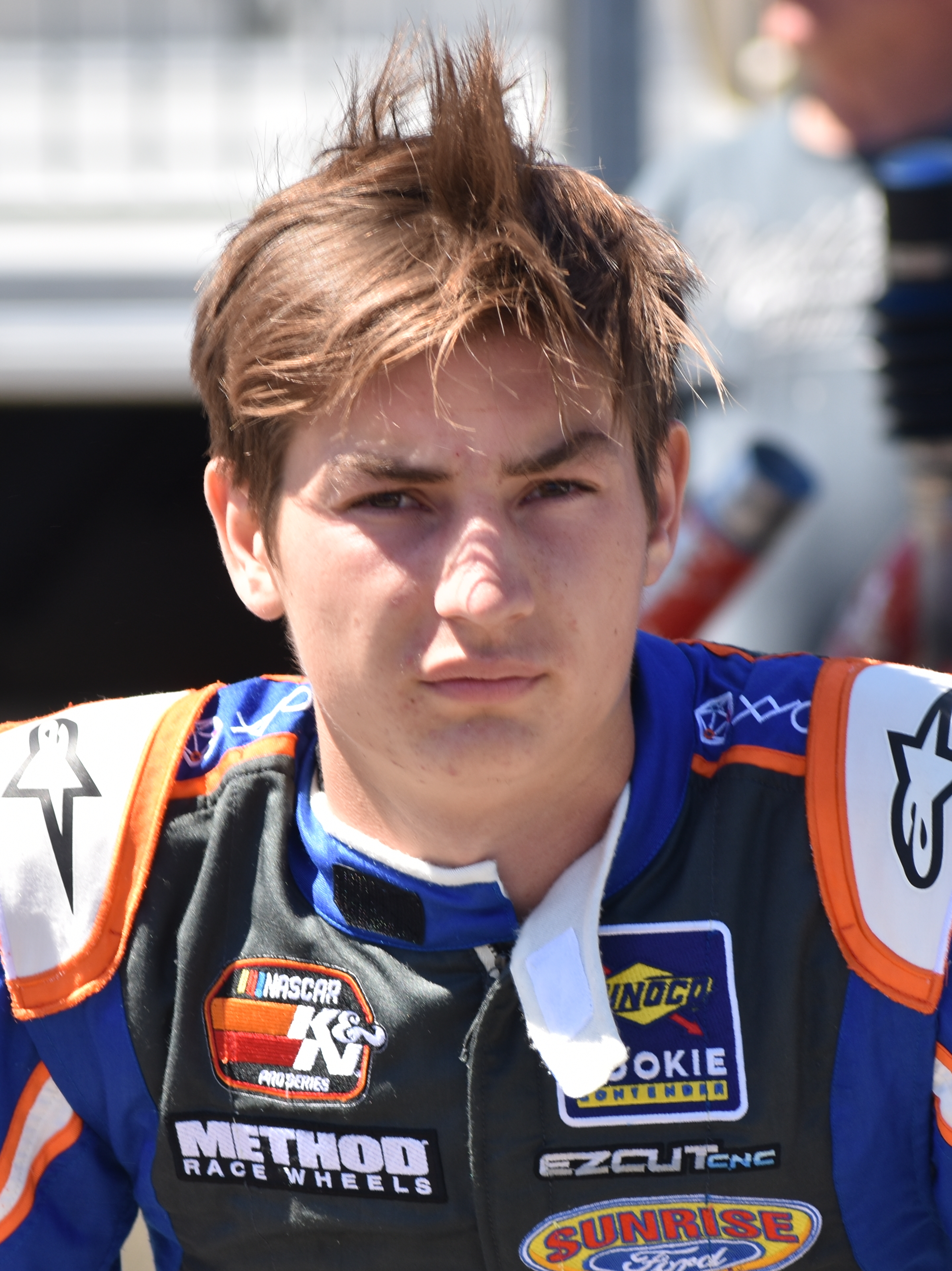
- Jones at Sonoma Raceway in 2019
- Born: Jagger Parnell Jones; July 29, 2002 (age 24); Scottsdale, Arizona, U.S.

Indy NXT career
- Debut season: 2023
- Current team: HMD Motorsports
- Car number: 33
- Starts: 14
- Championships: 0
- Wins: 0
- Podiums: 1
- Poles: 0
- Fastest laps: 0
- Best finish: 13th in 2023

Previous series
- 2022 2019 2019: USF2000 Championship; NASCAR K&N Pro Series East; NASCAR K&N Pro Series West

Jagger Parnell Jones (born July 29, 2002) is an American professional racing driver. He competed in Indy NXT for Cape Motorsports in 2023 and HMD Motorsports in 2024 replacing Niels Koolen for the race at Mid-Ohio. Jones previously competed in the U.S. F2000 National Championship with Cape Motorsports. He also competed in what is now the ARCA Menards Series West full-time in 2019, driving the No. 6 Ford for Sunrise Ford Racing.

Jones is the grandson of 1963 Indianapolis 500 winner Parnelli Jones and the son of former NASCAR, CART, and sports car driver P. J. Jones.

== Early career ==
Jones began racing go-karts at the age of nine in both the United States and in Europe. He made his late model debut for JR Motorsports at Myrtle Beach Speedway in June 2018, a race he went on to win. He later drove two more races for JRM, competing at South Boston Speedway in July and Hickory Motor Speedway in September. Jones won five races at Kern County Raceway Park in 2018, winning the track's NASCAR Whelen All-American Late Model Championship.

== Education ==
Jones attended Notre Dame Preparatory School. He later graduated from High Point University with a bachelor's degree in business administration.

== NASCAR series ==
On January 29, 2019, it was announced that Jones would move up to the NASCAR K&N Pro Series West to drive Sunrise Ford Racing's No. 6 Ford. He expressed confidence at the beginning of the season, saying, "I'm going to do my best to use my experience to win some races." Jones nearly won on debut at the Dirt Track at Las Vegas Motor Speedway, leading with one lap remaining before being passed by Hailie Deegan while navigating lapped traffic in turns one and two. Despite being moved out of the bottom lane, Jones held no ill will against Deegan's last-lap move, saying, "I think her move was fine...she didn't really do anything too bad. It's just the lapped car cut me off in front. It just pushed me up the track." Jones also drove the NORRA 1000 off-road race in Mexico during 2019.

Despite finishing second in points, winning rookie of the year, and winning one race during the 2019 season in the West Series, Jones did not choose to continue to race with Bruncati's team for the 2020 season.

After not committing to a West Series ride for the beginning of the 2020 season, Jones raced in the NASCAR Advance Auto Parts Weekly Series late models at Irwindale Speedway.

== Open-wheel career ==
On November 2, 2021, it was announced that Jones would make his open-wheel racing debut in the U.S. F2000 National Championship driving for Cape Motorsports in 2022. He finished fourth in the standings with one win and four further podiums to his name, being awarded the rookie of the year title.

On September 7, 2022, Cape Motorsports announced that Jones would move up the Road to Indy ladder to Indy NXT in 2023. The season proved to be a challenge, as Jones scored just one top five finish - a second place at Detroit - and ended the year thirteenth in points.

== Sportscar career ==
Jones made his prototype racing debut in the IMSA VP Racing SportsCar Challenge at the back end of 2023, driving an LMP3 car for Remstar Racing at Road Atlanta. He would qualify on pole for both races, though a self-inflicted collision in race one and a mechanical problem in race two exterminated his podium chances.

The following year, Jones returned to the SportsCar Challenge, sweeping the weekend at St. Petersburg by winning both races from pole position.

== Personal life ==
Jones is a third generation driver. His grandfather, Parnelli, won the 1963 Indianapolis 500, while his father, P. J., raced in NASCAR, CART, and sports cars, winning the 1993 24 Hours of Daytona. He is an alumnus of Notre Dame Preparatory High School in Scottsdale, Arizona. Jones is a Dean's List Business major at High Point University, NC. Jones has a younger sibling, Jace, who also races.

== Racing record ==
=== Career summary ===
Season	Series	Team	Races	Wins	Poles	F/Laps	Podiums	Points	Position
2019	NASCAR K&N Pro Series West	Sunrise Ford Racing	14	1	1	0	5	542	**2nd**
2019	NASCAR K&N Pro Series East	Sunrise Ford Racing	2	0	0	0	0	0	NC†
2022	U.S. F2000 National Championship	Cape Motorsports	18	1	3	0	5	294	4th
2023	Indy NXT	Cape Motorsports	13	0	0	0	1	241	13th
2023	IMSA VP Racing SportsCar Challenge - LMP3	Remstar Racing	2	0	2	1	0	520	15th
2024	IMSA VP Racing SportsCar Challenge - LMP3	Fast MD Racing with Remstar	10	8	7	6	8	3310	**2nd**
2024	Indy NXT	HMD Motorsports	1	0	0	0	0	17	27th
2024	Mazda MX-5 Cup	BSI Racing	3	0	0	0	0	350	36th
2025	Mazda MX-5 Cup	BSI Racing	2	0	0	0	0	480	17th
2025	GT4 America Series - Pro-Am	FastMD Racing with Remstar Racing	2	0	0	0	0	0	NC†
2026	IMSA VP Racing SportsCar Challenge - LMP3	FastMD with Remstar	3	0	0	1	0	760	19th

*Season still in progress.

† As he was a guest driver, he Jones was ineligible to score points.

=== NASCAR ===
(key) (Bold – Pole position awarded by qualifying time. Italics – Pole position earned by points standings or practice time. * – Most laps led.)

==== K&N Pro Series West ====
NASCAR K&N Pro Series West results
Year	Team	No.	Make	1	2	3	4	5	6	7	8	9	10	11	12	13	14	NKNPSWC	Pts	Ref
2019	Sunrise Ford Racing	6	Ford	LVS; 2	IRW; 4	TUS; 4	TUS; 6	CNS; 7	SON; 14	DCS; 2	IOW; 11	EVG; 5	GTW; 7	**MER**; 14*	AAS; 1*	KCR; 2	PHO; 5	2nd	542	

=== American open-wheel racing results ===
==== U.S. F2000 National Championship ====
(key) (Races in bold indicate pole position) (Races in italics indicate fastest lap) (Races with * indicate most race laps led)

Year	Team	1	2	3	4	5	6	7	8	9	10	11	12	13	14	15	16	17	18	Rank	Points
2022	Cape Motorsports	STP; 1; 8	STP; 2; 3	ALA; 1; 9	ALA; 2; 1*	**IMS**; 1; 2*	IMS; 2; 18	IMS; 3; 3	IRP; 5	ROA; 1; 13	ROA; 2; 7	MOH; 1; 4	MOH; 2; 5	MOH; 3; 7	TOR; 1; 3	TOR; 2; 6	POR; 1; 17	POR; 2; 15	POR; 3; 4	4th	294

==== Indy NXT ====
(key) (Races in bold indicate pole position) (Races in italics indicate fastest lap) (Races with ^{L} indicate a race lap led) (Races with * indicate most race laps led)

Year	Team	1	2	3	4	5	6	7	8	9	10	11	12	13	14	Rank	Points
2023	Cape Motorsports	STP; 18	BAR; 12	IMS; 14	DET; 2	DET; 19	RDA; 9	MOH; 14	IOW; 11	NSH; 17	IMS; 18	GMP	POR; 12	LAG; 8	LAG; 10	13th	241
2024	HMD Motorsports	STP	BAR	IMS	IMS	DET	RDA	LGA	LGA	MOH; 13	IOW	GMP	POR	MIL	NSH	27th	17

=== Complete IMSA VP Racing SportsCar Challenge results ===
(key) (Races in bold indicate pole position) (Races in italics indicate fastest lap) (Races with ^{L} indicate a race lap led) (Races with * indicate most race laps led)

Year	Entrant	Class	Make	Engine	1	2	3	4	5	6	7	8	9	10	11	12	Rank	Points
2023	Remstar Racing	LMP3	Duqueine D-08	Nissan VK56DE 5.6 L V8	DAY; 1	DAY; 2	SEB; 1	SEB; 2	MOS; 1	MOS; 2	LIM; 1	LIM; 2	VIR; 1	VIR; 2	**ATL**; **1**; 6	**ATL**; **2**; 7	15th	520
2024	Fast MD Racing with Remstar	LMP3	Duqueine D-08	Nissan VK56DE 5.6 L V8	DAY; 1	DAY; 2	**SEB**; **1**; 1	**SEB**; **2**; 1	**MOS**; **1**; 1	**MOS**; **2**; 1	LIM; 1; 8	LIM; 2; 1	**VIR**; **1**; 1	**VIR**; **2**; 1	**ATL**; **1**; 4	ATL; 2; 1	2nd	3310
