= 2023 Mazda MX-5 Cup =

Motor racing competition

The 2023 Idemitsu Mazda MX-5 Cup presented by BF Goodrich is a single-make motor racing championship, the 19th season of the Mazda MX-5 Cup and the 3rd under a new sanctioning agreement with the International Motor Sports Association (IMSA). The series began on January 25 at Daytona International Speedway, and concluded on October 13 at Michelin Raceway Road Atlanta after 14 rounds. Jared Thomas defended the driver's championship, with his team JTR Motorsports Engineering winning the entrant's championship as well. Nate Cicero from McCumbee McAleer Racing won the Rookie of The Year award.

== Schedule ==
The schedule was announced on August 5, 2022, featuring 14 rounds across seven double-header weekends, one of which was not confirmed at the time. On September 1, the missing round was revealed to be Laguna Seca. All races are 45 minutes in length.

Rnd.	Circuit	Location	Dates	Supporting
1	Daytona International Speedway (Road Course)	Daytona Beach, Florida	January 25–27	IMSA WeatherTech SportsCar Championship
2	Daytona International Speedway (Road Course)	Daytona Beach, Florida	January 25–27	IMSA WeatherTech SportsCar Championship
3	Streets of St. Petersburg	St. Petersburg, Florida	March 3–5	NTT IndyCar Series
4	Streets of St. Petersburg	St. Petersburg, Florida	March 3–5	NTT IndyCar Series
5	WeatherTech Raceway Laguna Seca	Monterey, California	May 12–14	IMSA WeatherTech SportsCar Championship
6	WeatherTech Raceway Laguna Seca	Monterey, California	May 12–14	IMSA WeatherTech SportsCar Championship
7	Watkins Glen International	(New York (state)) Watkins Glen, New York	June 22–24	IMSA WeatherTech SportsCar Championship
8	Watkins Glen International	(New York (state)) Watkins Glen, New York	June 22–24	IMSA WeatherTech SportsCar Championship
9	Road America	Elkhart Lake, Wisconsin	August 4–6	IMSA WeatherTech SportsCar Championship
10	Road America	Elkhart Lake, Wisconsin	August 4–6	IMSA WeatherTech SportsCar Championship
11	Virginia International Raceway	Alton, Virginia	August 25–27	IMSA WeatherTech SportsCar Championship
12	Virginia International Raceway	Alton, Virginia	August 25–27	IMSA WeatherTech SportsCar Championship
13	Michelin Raceway Road Atlanta	(Georgia (U.S. state)) Braselton, Georgia	October 11–13	IMSA WeatherTech SportsCar Championship
14	Michelin Raceway Road Atlanta	(Georgia (U.S. state)) Braselton, Georgia	October 11–13	IMSA WeatherTech SportsCar Championship

== Entry list ==
All competitors utilize the Mazda MX-5 Cup car, modified to their homologated racing specification by Flis Performance.

Team	No.	Driver		Rounds
Carter Racing Enterprises	03	(United States) John Hansen	R	5–6
Copeland Motorsports	2	(United States) Maximilian Opalski		All
Copeland Motorsports	22	(United States) Jeremy Fletcher	R	All
Copeland Motorsports	51	(United States) Tyler Gonzalez		1–2, 7
JTR Motorsports Engineering	3	(Canada) James Hinchcliffe		4
JTR Motorsports Engineering	3	(United States) Cody Powell	R	6
JTR Motorsports Engineering	4	(United States) Zane Hodgen	R	1–3
JTR Motorsports Engineering	23	(United States) Glenn McGee		1, 3–4
JTR Motorsports Engineering	24	(United States) Aaron Jeansonne		All
JTR Motorsports Engineering	26	(United States) Peter Atwater		1–3, 5–7
JTR Motorsports Engineering	69	(United States) Anthony McIntosh		All
JTR Motorsports Engineering	81	(United States) James Hayosh	R	1, 4–5
JTR Motorsports Engineering	82	(United States) Woody Heimann		All
JTR Motorsports Engineering	96	(United States) Jared Thomas		All
Spark Performance	5	(United States) Gresham Wagner		All
Spark Performance	15	(United States) Sally Mott	R	7
Spark Performance	20	(United States) Hernan Palermo		All
Spark Performance	33	(United States) Alex Bachoura		1–6
Spark Performance	50	(United States) Grant West	R	1–5, 7
Spark Performance	54	(United States) Heather Hadley	R	All
Spark Performance	65	(United States) Bryce Cornet		1, 3
Hixon Motor Sports	10	(United States) Thomas Annunziata	R	All
Hixon Motor Sports	32	(United States) Christian Hodneland		7
Hixon Motor Sports	44	(New Zealand) Bailey Cruse	R	5–7
Hixon Motor Sports	48	(United States) Rossi Lee		2
Hixon Motor Sports	55	(Canada) Jonathan Neudorf	R	All
Hixon Motor Sports	72	(United States) Connor Zilisch		1–3, 6–7
Hixon Motor Sports	73	(United States) Steven Clemons	R	1
Hixon Motor Sports	74	(United States) Hanna Zellers		1, 3–5
Hixon Motor Sports	78	(United States) Julian DaCosta	R	6–7
Hixon Motor Sports	80	(United States) Ethan Tyler		1, 4–6
Hixon Motor Sports	85	(Brazil) Bruno Smielevski	R	1–3
Hixon Motor Sports	87	(United States) Selin Rollan		All
Hixon Motor Sports	95	(United States) Farhan Siddiqi	R	2, 4–7
Robert Noaker Racing	13	(United States) Robert Noaker		All
Robert Noaker Racing	17	(United States) Joe Rainey	R	5, 7
Robert Noaker Racing	25	(United States) Bryan Heitman	R	5, 7
Robert Noaker Racing	30	(United States) Joey Rainey	R	5
Robert Noaker Racing	88	(United States) Justin Brigandi	R	4
Saito MotorSport Group	19	(United States) Clayton Ketcher	R	4
Saito MotorSport Group	19	(United States) Michael Carter		6
Saito MotorSport Group	19	(United States) Ben Keating		7
McCumbee McAleer Racing	28	(United States) Sam Paley		1–4
McCumbee McAleer Racing	39	(United States) John Jodoin		All
McCumbee McAleer Racing	49	(United States) Andrew Wilson	R	5
McCumbee McAleer Racing	76	(United States) Matthew Dirks		1–4
McCumbee McAleer Racing	83	(United States) Nate Cicero	R	All

R = Eligible for Rookie's Championship

== Race results ==
Bold indicates overall winner.

Round		Circuit	Pole position	Fastest lap	Winning driver
1	R1	Daytona	#72 Hixon Motor Sports	#28 McCumbee McAleer Racing	#51 Copeland Motorsports
1	R1	Daytona	(United States) Connor Zilisch	(United States) Sam Paley	(United States) Tyler Gonzalez
1	R2	Daytona	#28 McCumbee McAleer Racing	#5 Spark Performance	#96 JTR Motorsports Engineering
1	R2	Daytona	(United States) Sam Paley	(United States) Gresham Wagner	(United States) Jared Thomas
2	R1	St. Petersburg	#13 Robert Noaker Racing	#5 Spark Performance	#5 Spark Performance
2	R1	St. Petersburg	(United States) Robert Noaker	(United States) Gresham Wagner	(United States) Gresham Wagner
2	R2	St. Petersburg	#5 Spark Performance	#72 Hixon Motor Sports	#72 Hixon Motor Sports
2	R2	St. Petersburg	(United States) Gresham Wagner	(United States) Connor Zilisch	(United States) Connor Zilisch
3	R1	Laguna Seca	#5 Spark Performance	#72 Hixon Motor Sports	#72 Hixon Motor Sports
3	R1	Laguna Seca	(United States) Gresham Wagner	(United States) Connor Zilisch	(United States) Connor Zilisch
3	R2	Laguna Seca	#24 JTR Motorsports Engineering	#24 JTR Motorsports Engineering	#24 JTR Motorsports Engineering
3	R2	Laguna Seca	(United States) Aaron Jeansonne	(United States) Aaron Jeansonne	(United States) Aaron Jeansonne
4	R1	Watkins Glen	#5 Spark Performance	#13 Robert Noaker Racing	#24 JTR Motorsports Engineering
4	R1	Watkins Glen	(United States) Gresham Wagner	(United States) Robert Noaker	(United States) Aaron Jeansonne
4	R2	Watkins Glen	#87 Hixon Motor Sports	#87 Hixon Motor Sports	#87 Hixon Motor Sports
4	R2	Watkins Glen	(United States) Selin Rollan	(United States) Selin Rollan	(United States) Selin Rollan
5	R1	Road America	#55 Hixon Motor Sports	#2 Copeland Motorsports	#5 Spark Performance
5	R1	Road America	(Canada) Jonathan Neudorf	(United States) Maximilian Opalski	(United States) Gresham Wagner
5	R2	Road America	#2 Copeland Motorsports	#96 JTR Motorsports Engineering	#96 JTR Motorsports Engineering
5	R2	Road America	(United States) Maximilian Opalski	(United States) Jared Thomas	(United States) Jared Thomas
6	R1	Virginia	#24 JTR Motorsports Engineering	#22 Copeland Motorsports	#83 McCumbee McAleer Racing
6	R1	Virginia	(United States) Aaron Jeansonne	(United States) Jeremy Fletcher	(United States) Nate Cicero
6	R2	Virginia	#72 Hixon Motor Sports	#19 Saito MotorSport Group	#96 JTR Motorsports Engineering
6	R2	Virginia	(United States) Connor Zilisch	(United States) Michael Carter	(United States) Jared Thomas
7	R1	Road Atlanta	#24 JTR Motorsports Engineering	#5 Spark Performance	#72 Hixon Motor Sports
7	R1	Road Atlanta	(United States) Aaron Jeansonne	(United States) Gresham Wagner	(United States) Connor Zilisch
7	R2	Road Atlanta	#5 Spark Performance	#51 Copeland Motorsports	#72 Hixon Motor Sports
7	R2	Road Atlanta	(United States) Gresham Wagner	(United States) Tyler Gonzalez	(United States) Connor Zilisch

== Championship Standings ==
=== Points System ===
Championship points are awarded at the finish of each event according to the chart below.

Position	1	2	3	4	5	6	7	8	9	10	11	12	13	14	15	16	17	18	19	20	21	22	23	24	25	26	27	28	29	30+
Points	350	320	300	280	260	250	240	230	220	210	200	190	180	170	160	150	140	130	120	110	100	90	80	70	60	50	40	30	20	10

For each race, bonus points are awarded for the following:

Award	Points
Pole Position	10
Most Race Laps Led	10
Fastest Race Lap	10

- The ten (10) additional points for achieving pole position are not awarded if the starting grid is determined by “Other Means”.
- In the case of a tie for the most laps led, the competitor that finishes the highest in the running order is declared the winner.
- In the case of a tie for the fastest Race lap, the competitor that first achieves the fastest Race lap is declared the winner.

=== Driver's Championship ===
IMSA recognizes driver champions based on the total number of championship points earned during the season.

Pos.	Driver	DAY		STP		LGA		WGL		ELK		VIR		ATL		Bonus	Points
1	(United States) Jared Thomas	9	1	13	26	2	2	3	4	2	1	2	1	3	5	10	3930
2	(United States) Aaron Jeansonne	4	6	4	2	3	**1**	1	7	15	21	**23**	2	**7**	7	60	3570
3	(United States) Selin Rollan	7	4	6	4	4	3	10	**1**	9	23	25	12	4	2	30	3370
4	(United States) Maximilian Opalski	11	5	10	16	12	25	21	13	5	**3**	4	4	6	3	30	3050
5	(United States) Gresham Wagner	5	3	1	**23**	**6**	14	**26**	16	1	2	17	10	17	**19**	100	2990
6	(United States) Nate Cicero R	26	8	9	19	5	4	12	19	4	6	1	3	18	10	0	2990
7	(United States) Robert Noaker	12	19	**11**	15	7	23	4	2	3	4	5	7	27	6	20	2980
8	(United States) Connor Zilisch	**2**	15	2	1	1	22					3	**9**	1	1	110	2920
9	(United States) John Jodoin	18	23	8	18	13	18	5	5	6	5	6	6	5	9	0	2890
10	(United States) Thomas Annunziata R	8	24	5	22	11	7	2	3	26	18	7	5	8	8	0	2850
11	(United States) Alex Bachoura	27	10	12	3	15	6	16	22	10	10	13	17	9	12	0	2540
12	(United States) Hernan Palermo	19	14	18	17	17	19	7	10	11	8	14	14	12	11	0	2430
13	(United States) Woody Heimann	16	7	24	12	14	9	9	21	13	19	15	16	11	14	0	2340
14	(Canada) Jonathan Neudorf R	24	9	23	9	26	20	22	8	**14**	7	11	8	13	25	10	2160
15	(United States) Anthony McIntosh	15	13	20	6	16	13	25	DNS	8	20	12	DNS	15	13	0	1960
16	(United States) Heather Hadley R	22	25	19	8	21	17	18	14	7	13	18	18	14	28	0	1920
17	(United States) Jeremy Fletcher R	14	26	22	13	22	26	24	6	16	24	10	11	10	23	0	1880
18	(United States) Sam Paley	3	**21**	3	5	8	8	11	24							20	1710
19	(United States) Tyler Gonzalez	1	2	7	25									2	4	10	1580
20	(United States) Peter Atwater	21	12	16	21	25	11			22	9	19	15	23	26	0	1520
21	(United States) Farhan Siddiqi R			25	14			20	17	21	17	21	22	21	21	0	1110
22	(United States) Matthew Dirks	17	11	21	20	23	12	23	20							0	1010
23	(Brazil) Bruno Smielevski R	6	28	26	10	10	10									0	960
24	(United States) Grant West R	DNS	DNS	15	7	24	21	17	25	DNS	DNS			28	15	0	960
25	(United States) James Hayosh R	20	16					15	12	12	15					0	960
26	(United States) Glenn McGee	10	22			18	16	8	18							0	940
27	(New Zealand) Bailey Cruse R									19	12	20	24	19	16	0	760
28	(United States) Zane Hodgen R	25	17	17	11	19	24									0	730
29	(United States) Bryce Cornet	13	27			9	5									0	700
30	(United States) Hanna Zellers	28	20			20	15	27	DNS	23	22					0	620
31	(United States) Ethan Tyler	29	29					13	11	DNS	DNS	22	21			0	610
32	(United States) Julian DaCosta R											9	23	16	17	0	590
33	(United States) John Hansen R									17	11	24	20			0	520
34	(Canada) James Hinchcliffe							6	9							0	470
35	(United States) Joe Rainey R									18	14			22	24	0	460
36	(United States) Michael Carter											8	13			0	420
37	(United States) Bryan Heitman R									20	16			25	22	0	410
38	(United States) Justin Brigandi R							19	15							0	280
39	(United States) Cody Powell R											16	19			0	270
40	(United States) Clayton Ketcher R							14	23							0	250
41	(United States) Rossi Lee			14	24											0	240
42	(United States) Sally Mott R													20	18	0	240
43	(United States) Steven Clemons R	23	18													0	210
44	(United States) Ben Keating													26	20	0	160
45	(United States) Christian Hodneland													24	27	0	110
46	(United States) Joey Rainey R									24	DNS					0	70
47	(United States) Andrew Wilson R									25	DNS					0	60
Pos.	Driver	DAY		STP		LGA		WGL		ELK		VIR		ATL		Bonus	Points

Colour	Result
Gold	Winner
Silver	Second place
Bronze	Third place
Green	Points classification
Blue	Non-points classification
Blue	Non-classified finish (NC)
Purple	Retired, not classified (Ret)
Red	Did not qualify (DNQ)
Red	Did not pre-qualify (DNPQ)
Black	Disqualified (DSQ)
White	Did not start (DNS)
White	Withdrew (WD)
White	Race cancelled (C)
Blank	Did not practice (DNP)
Blank	Did not arrive (DNA)
Blank	Excluded (EX)

**Bold** - Pole position

Italics - Fastest lap

Underline = Most Laps Led

=== Entrant's Championship ===
Each entrant receives championship points for its highest car finishing position in each race. The positions of subsequent finishing cars from the same entrant are not considered in the results and all other cars are elevated in the finishing positions accordingly.

Pos.	Driver	DAY		STP		LGA		WGL		ELK		VIR		ATL		Bonus	Points
1	JTR Motorsports Engineering	4	1	4	2	2	**1**	1	4	2	1	**2**	1	**3**	5	70	4540
2	Hixon Motor Sports	**2**	4	2	1	1	3	2	**1**	**9**	7	3	**5**	1	1	150	4540
3	McCumbee McAleer Racing	3	**8**	3	5	5	4	5	5	4	5	1	3	5	9	20	4060
4	Spark Performance	5	3	1	**3**	**6**	5	**7**	10	1	2	13	10	9	**11**	100	4030
5	Copeland Motorsports	1	2	7	13	12	25	21	6	5	**3**	4	4	6	3	40	3950
6	Robert Noaker Racing	12	19	**11**	15	7	23	4	2	3	4	5	7	22	6	20	3760
7	Saito MotorSport Group							14	23			8	13	2	4	20	1620
8	Carter Racing Enterprises									17	11	24	20			0	940
Pos.	Driver	DAY		STP		LGA		WGL		ELK		VIR		ATL		Bonus	Points
