= 2025 Mazda MX-5 Cup =

Motor racing competition

The 2025 Whelen Mazda MX-5 Cup Presented By Michelin is a single-make motor racing championship, the 21st season of the Mazda MX-5 Cup and the 5th sanctioned by the International Motor Sports Association (IMSA). The series began on January 23 at Daytona International Speedway, and will conclude on October 11 at Michelin Raceway Road Atlanta after 14 rounds.

Gresham Wagner was the defending champion, having won his second series title in 2024. Jeremy Fletcher became champion at season's end.

== Schedule ==
The schedule was announced on October 16, 2024, featuring 14 rounds across seven double-header weekends. In a change from the 2024 calendar, rounds at St. Petersburg and Barber were added, while events at Sebring and Laguna Seca were dropped. All races are 45 minutes in length.

Round		Circuit	Location	Dates	Supporting
1	R1	Daytona International Speedway (Road Course)	Daytona Beach, Florida	January 22–24	IMSA SportsCar Championship
1	R2	Daytona International Speedway (Road Course)	Daytona Beach, Florida	January 22–24	IMSA SportsCar Championship
2	R3	Grand Prix of St. Petersburg	St. Petersburg, Florida	February 28 – March 2	IndyCar Series
2	R4	Grand Prix of St. Petersburg	St. Petersburg, Florida	February 28 – March 2	IndyCar Series
3	R5	Barber Motorsports Park	Birmingham, Alabama	May 2–4	IndyCar Series
3	R6	Barber Motorsports Park	Birmingham, Alabama	May 2–4	IndyCar Series
4	R7	Mid-Ohio Sports Car Course	Lexington, Ohio	June 6–8	Michelin Pilot Challenge
4	R8	Mid-Ohio Sports Car Course	Lexington, Ohio	June 6–8	Michelin Pilot Challenge
5	R9	Canadian Tire Motorsports Park	Bowmanville, Ontario, Canada	July 11–13	IMSA SportsCar Championship
5	R10	Canadian Tire Motorsports Park	Bowmanville, Ontario, Canada	July 11–13	IMSA SportsCar Championship
6	R11	Virginia International Raceway	Alton, Virginia	August 22–24	IMSA SportsCar Championship
6	R12	Virginia International Raceway	Alton, Virginia	August 22–24	IMSA SportsCar Championship
7	R13	Michelin Raceway Road Atlanta	(Georgia (U.S. state)) Braselton, Georgia	October 8–10	IMSA SportsCar Championship
7	R14	Michelin Raceway Road Atlanta	(Georgia (U.S. state)) Braselton, Georgia	October 8–10	IMSA SportsCar Championship
NC		Martinsville Speedway	Ridgeway, Virginia	October 23	NASCAR Cup Series

== Entry list ==
All competitors utilize the Mazda MX-5 Cup car, modified to their homologated racing specification by Flis Performance.

Team	No.	Driver	Class	Rounds
Hendricks Motorsports	01	(United States) Ruben Caceres-Martos	R	1–2, NC
Hendricks Motorsports	31	(United States) Ashlyn Speed		1–6
Hendricks Motorsports	31	(New Zealand) Earl Bamber		NC
Hendricks Motorsports	51	(United States) Will Robinson	R	7
Hendricks Motorsports	54	(United States) Heather Hadley		1–4
Hendricks Motorsports	54	(United States) Tom Long		NC
JTR Motorsports Engineering	07	(United States) Julian DaCosta		1
JTR Motorsports Engineering	6	(United States) Cody Powell		1, 3–6
JTR Motorsports Engineering	8	(United States) Justin Gravett	R	7
JTR Motorsports Engineering	11	(New Zealand) Bailey Cruse	R	1–3
JTR Motorsports Engineering	15	(United States) Sally Mott		All, NC
JTR Motorsports Engineering	26	(United States) Peter Atwater		1–4, 6–7
JTR Motorsports Engineering	68	(United States) Steve Weber	R	2–5
JTR Motorsports Engineering	69	(United States) Glenn McGee		1–5
JTR Motorsports Engineering	82	(United States) Woody Heimann		4, 7
JTR Motorsports Engineering	96	(United States) Jared Thomas		All
BSI Racing	09	(United States) Damon Ockey		3–7
BSI Racing	2	(United States) Jesse Love	R	4
BSI Racing	7	(United States) Noah Harmon	R	5–7
BSI Racing	13	(United States) Westin Workman		All, NC
BSI Racing	27	(Mexico) Helio Meza	R	All
BSI Racing	32	(United States) Christian Hodneland		All
BSI Racing	57	(United States) Tyler Gonzalez		All
BSI Racing	80	(United States) Ethan Tyler		1, 3–4, 6
BSI Racing	86	(United States) Jagger Jones		1–2, NC
BSI Racing	87	(United States) Selin Rollan		6
BSI Racing	95	(United States) Farhan Siddiqi		1–2, 4, 6, NC
BSI Racing	95	(United States) Julian DaCosta		7
McCumbee McAleer Racing	2	(United States) Brandon Pierce		NC
McCumbee McAleer Racing	3	(United States) Ren Messinger	R	1–3
McCumbee McAleer Racing	5	(United States) Gresham Wagner		1, 7
McCumbee McAleer Racing	22	(United States) Jeremy Fletcher		All, NC
McCumbee McAleer Racing	23	(United States) Justin Adakonis	R	All, NC
McCumbee McAleer Racing	30	(United States) Ethan Tovo		NC
McCumbee McAleer Racing	44	(United States) Bobby Gossett	R	All, NC
McCumbee McAleer Racing	81	(United States) Jackson Tovo		NC
McCumbee McAleer Racing	83	(United States) Nate Cicero		4–7
AAG Racing	9	(United States) Chris Clarke		2
AAG Racing	28	(United States) Christopher Haldeman		1–4
AAG Racing	28	(United States) Alex Gutierrez		6
AAG Racing	58	(United States) Todd Buras		1–2
AAG Racing	58	(United States) Skip Brock	R	3
AAG Racing	58	(United States) Rocco Pasquarella	R	6–7
AAG Racing	76	(United States) Frankie Barroso	R	1, NC
AAG Racing	76	(United States) Jack Murchison	R	2
AAG Racing	76	(United States) Skyler Cottrell	R	3, 6–7
AAG Racing	77	(United States) Noah Harmon	R	1–4
RAFA Racing Team by MMR	12	(Uruguay) Maite Cáceres	R	1–4, 6
RAFA Racing Team by MMR	12	(United Kingdom) Jem Hepworth		5
RAFA Racing Team by MMR	81	(France) Caroline Candas		1–3
RAFA Racing Team by MMR	81	(United States) Gresham Wagner		4–6
Saito Motorsport Group	19	(United States) Nate Cicero		1–3
Saito Motorsport Group	19	(Canada) Marcello Paniccia	R	5–7
Saito Motorsport Group	29	(United States) Ethan Goulart	R	All
Saito Motorsport Group	39	(United States) Zach Hollingshead		6–7
Spark Performance	33	(United States) Alex Bachoura		All
Spark Performance	50	(United States) Grant West		All
Spark Performance	65	(United States) Bryce Cornet		1–6
Spark Performance	65	(United States) Capers Zentmeyer		NC
Spark Performance	78	(United States) Sally McNulty	R	1–2
Parker DeLong Racing	42	(United States) Parker DeLong		All
Parker DeLong Racing	43	(United States) Charlotte Traynor	R	3, 6–7
Advanced Autosports	10	(United States) Matt Novak	R	7
Advanced Autosports	56	(United States) Nathan Nicholson		All, NC
Advanced Autosports	98	(United States) Vaughn Mishko	R	7
Advanced Autosports	99	(United States) Vaughn Mishko	R	2–4
Advanced Autosports	99	(United States) Ethan Jacobs	R	6–7

R = Eligible for Rookie's Championship

== Race results ==
Bold indicates overall winner.

Round		Circuit	Pole position	Fastest lap	Winning driver
1	R1	Daytona	(United States) #19 Saito Motorsport Group	(United States) #5 McCumbee McAleer Racing	**(United States) #57 BSI Racing**
1	R1	Daytona	(United States) Nate Cicero	(United States) Gresham Wagner	**(United States) Tyler Gonzalez**
1	R2	Daytona	(United States) #19 Saito Motorsport Group	(United States) #22 McCumbee McAleer Racing	**(United States) #96 JTR Motorsports Engineering**
1	R2	Daytona	(United States) Nate Cicero	(United States) Jeremy Fletcher	**(United States) Jared Thomas**
2	R1	St. Petersburg	(United States) #22 McCumbee McAleer Racing	(United States) #56 Advanced Autosports	**(United States) #96 JTR Motorsports Engineering**
2	R1	St. Petersburg	(United States) Jeremy Fletcher	(United States) Nathan Nicholson	**(United States) Jared Thomas**
2	R2	St. Petersburg	(United States) #22 McCumbee McAleer Racing	(United States) #22 McCumbee McAleer Racing	**(United States) #57 BSI Racing**
2	R2	St. Petersburg	(United States) Jeremy Fletcher	(United States) Jeremy Fletcher	**(United States) Tyler Gonzalez**
3	R1	Barber	(United States) #22 McCumbee McAleer Racing	(United States) #19 Saito Motorsport Group	**(United States) #57 BSI Racing**
3	R1	Barber	(United States) Jeremy Fletcher	(United States) Nate Cicero	**(United States) Tyler Gonzalez**
3	R2	Barber	(United States) #19 Saito Motorsport Group	(United States) #13 BSI Racing	**(United States) #57 BSI Racing**
3	R2	Barber	(United States) Nate Cicero	(United States) Westin Workman	**(United States) Tyler Gonzalez**
4	R1	Mid-Ohio	(United States) #83 McCumbee McAleer Racing	(United States) #27 BSI Racing	**(United States) #22 McCumbee McAleer Racing**
4	R1	Mid-Ohio	(United States) Nate Cicero	(Mexico) Helio Meza	**(United States) Jeremy Fletcher**
4	R2	Mid-Ohio	(United States) #81 RAFA Racing Team by MMR	(United States) #44 McCumbee McAleer Racing	**(United States) #29 Saito Motorsport Group**
4	R2	Mid-Ohio	(United States) Gresham Wagner	(United States) Bobby Gossett	**(United States) Ethan Goulart**
5	R1	Mosport	(United States) #83 McCumbee McAleer Racing	(United States) #96 JTR Motorsports Engineering	**(United States) #57 BSI Racing**
5	R1	Mosport	(United States) Nate Cicero	(United States) Jared Thomas	**(United States) Tyler Gonzalez**
5	R2	Mosport	(United States) #83 McCumbee McAleer Racing	(United States) #27 BSI Racing	**(United States) #81 RAFA Racing Team by MMR**
5	R2	Mosport	(United States) Nate Cicero	(Mexico) Helio Meza	**(United States) Gresham Wagner**
6	R1	Virginia	(United States) #23 McCumbee McAleer Racing	(United States) #27 BSI Racing	**(United States) #22 McCumbee McAleer Racing**
6	R1	Virginia	(United States) Justin Adakonis	(Mexico) Helio Meza	**(United States) Jeremy Fletcher**
6	R2	Virginia	(United States) #27 BSI Racing	**(United States)** #57 BSI Racing	**(United States) #22 McCumbee McAleer Racing**
6	R2	Virginia	(Mexico) Helio Meza	**(United States)** Tyler Gonzalez	**(United States) Jeremy Fletcher**
7	R1	Road Atlanta	(United States) #83 McCumbee McAleer Racing	(United States) #13 BSI Racing	**(United States) #22 McCumbee McAleer Racing**
7	R1	Road Atlanta	(United States) Nate Cicero	(United States) Westin Workman	**(United States) Jeremy Fletcher**
7	R2	Road Atlanta	(United States) #13 BSI Racing	(United States) #23 McCumbee McAleer Racing	(United States) #42 **Parker DeLong Racing**
7	R2	Road Atlanta	(United States) Westin Workman	(United States) Justin Adakonis	(United States) Parker DeLong
NC		Martinsville	(United States) #56 Advanced Autosports	(United States) #22 McCumbee McAleer Racing	**(United States) #22 McCumbee McAleer Racing**
NC		Martinsville	(United States) Nathan Nicholson	(United States) Jeremy Fletcher	**(United States) Jeremy Fletcher**

== Championship standings ==
=== Points system ===
Championship points are awarded at the finish of each event according to the chart below.

Position	1	2	3	4	5	6	7	8	9	10	11	12	13	14	15	16	17	18	19	20	21	22	23	24	25	26	27	28	29	30+
Points	350	320	300	280	260	250	240	230	220	210	200	190	180	170	160	150	140	130	120	110	100	90	80	70	60	50	40	30	20	10

=== Driver's championship ===
IMSA recognizes driver champions based on the total number of championship points earned during the season.

Pos.	Driver	DAY		STP		BAR		MOH		MOS		VIR		ATL		MAR	Bonus	Points
1	(United States) Jeremy Fletcher	8	6	**4**	**4**	**4**	28	1	3	22	2	1	1	1	20	1	60	3630
2	(United States) Tyler Gonzalez	1	34	16	1	1	1	7	31	1	6	2	6	26	11		30	3290
3	(United States) Nathan Nicholson	14	4	3	2	18	6	4	2	4	4	6	7	25	27	**12**	20	3230
4	(United States) Jared Thomas	12	1	1	3	15	5	24	6	6	9	31	24	4	5		10	3040
5	(Mexico) Helio Meza R	4	20	30	28	6	8	2	8	2	10	8	**20**	12	4		20	2850
6	(United States) Noah Harmon R	7	8	6	6	17	3	6	20	11	23	24	8	6	2		0	2800
7	(United States) Ethan Goulart R	2	12	7	30	8	22	21	1	12	8	7	5	29	22		0	2620
8	(United States) Nate Cicero	**30**	**7**	22	5	2	**13**	**31**	4	**10**	**3**	5	26	**5**	28		100	2610
9	(United States) Justin Adakonis R	10	29	5	17	5	4	5	27	25	14	**27**	4	11	3	7	0	2560
10	(United States) Westin Workman	32	22	17	23	3	2	30	5	5	13	3	3	15	**29**	2	20	2480
11	(United States) Parker DeLong	6	26	15	11	16	12	14	12	7	7	29	10	28	1		0	2470
12	(United States) Sally Mott	23	21	14	10	13	11	16	14	16	12	11	32	13	12	5	0	2200
13	(United States) Bobby Gossett R	16	9	12	7	33	24	15	30	17	15	13	13	9	9	11	10	2170
14	(United States) Gresham Wagner	36	24					3	**29**	3	1	4	2	3	31		30	1990
15	(United States) Grant West	13	15	21	25	19	19	11	18	14	11	10	31	30	6		0	1930
16	(United States) Bryce Cornet	3	13	29	9	21	7	8	11	8	19	26	29				0	1920
17	(United States) Alex Bachoura	15	25	23	26	25	18	12	10	13	16	14	16	20	21		0	1810
18	(United States) Peter Atwater	24	10	9	19	22	16	23	16			15	15	18	15		0	1730
19	(United States) Glenn McGee	31	30	2	8	11	9	13	7	23	22						0	1590
20	(United States) Skyler Cottrell R					10	10					9	11	10	7		0	1310
21	(United States) Heather Hadley	18	35	10	21	14	14	18	15								0	1090
22	(United States) Ashlyn Speed R	29	16	18	20	28	25	26	28	15	20	17	23				0	1070
23	(United States) Ren Messinger R	11	3	8	22	9	17										0	1030
24	(Canada) Marcello Paniccia R									9	5	25	14	19	13		0	1020
25	(United States) Cody Powell	25	28			12	27	20	19	19	17	12	30				0	820
26	(United States) Christian Hodneland	33	DNS	31	DNS	23	15	22	24	20	21	30	18	17	19		0	970
27	(United States) Ethan Tyler	5	18			20	20	32	26			22	17				0	910
28	(Uruguay) Maite Cáceres R	26	32	11	13	31	21	27	32			16	22				0	780
29	(United States) Damon Ockey					26	30	25	22	21	18	21	25	27	18		0	770
30	(United States) Ethan Jacobs R											19	9	2	24		0	730
31	(United States) Julian DaCosta	17	11											7	23		0	670
32	(United States) Vaughn Mishko R			25	14	DNS	DNS	9	25					22	25		0	670
33	(United States) Woody Heimann							17	9					16	16		0	660
34	(United States) Christopher Haldeman	27	23	19	16	29	33	19	23								0	640
35	(United States) Rocco Pasquarella R											22	12	31	8		0	540
36	(France) Caroline Candas	28	17	24	18	27	23										0	510
37	(United States) Jagger Jones	9	5	DNS	DNS											3	0	480
38	(New Zealand) Bailey Cruse R	20	14	28	24	24	31										0	480
39	(United States) Charlotte Traynor R					30	29					18	21	23	17		0	470
40	(United States) Todd Buras	21	2	32	DNS												0	430
41	(United States) Justin Gravett R													8	14		0	410
42	(United States) Jesse Love R							10	13								0	390
43	(United States) Matt Novak R													14	10		0	390
44	(United States) Ruben Caceres-Martos R	22	33	20	15											10	0	380
45	(United States) Jack Murchison R			13	12												0	370
46	(United States) Steve Weber R			26	29	32	26	29	17	24	DNS						0	360
47	(United States) Farhan Siddiqi	34	31	27	27			28	21			23	28			13	0	340
48	(United States) Skip Brock R					7	31										0	250
49	(United Kingdom) Jem Hepworth									18	24						0	200
50	(United States) Frankie Barroso R	19	27													4	0	160
51	(United States) Zach Hollingshead R											32	27	21	30		0	160
52	(United States) Alejandro Gutierrez R											28	19				0	150
53	(United States) Sally McNulty R	35	19	DNS	DNS												0	120
54	(United States) Will Robinson R													24	26		0	120
	(United States) Chris Clarke			DNS	DNS												0	0
	(United States) Selin Rollan R											DNS	DNS				0	0
Non-championship Round-only drivers
	(United States) Capers Zentmeyer															6		
	(United States) Jackson Tovo															8		
	(United States) Brandon Pierce															9		
	(United States) Tom Long															14		
	(New Zealand) Earl Bamber															15		
	(United States) Ethan Tovo															16		
Pos.	Driver	DAY		STP		BAR		MOH		MOS		VIR		ATL		MAR	Bonus	Points

Colour	Result
Gold	Winner
Silver	Second place
Bronze	Third place
Green	Points classification
Blue	Non-points classification
Blue	Non-classified finish (NC)
Purple	Retired, not classified (Ret)
Red	Did not qualify (DNQ)
Red	Did not pre-qualify (DNPQ)
Black	Disqualified (DSQ)
White	Did not start (DNS)
White	Withdrew (WD)
White	Race cancelled (C)
Blank	Did not practice (DNP)
Blank	Did not arrive (DNA)
Blank	Excluded (EX)

**Bold** - Pole position

Italics - Fastest lap

Underline = Most Laps Led

†: Post-event penalty. Car moved to back of class.
