= 2026 IMSA VP Racing SportsCar Challenge =

Motor racing competition

The 2026 IMSA VP Racing SportsCar Challenge season was the fourth season of the IMSA VP Racing SportsCar Challenge after being established in 2023 as a replacement for the IMSA Prototype Challenge. The season began on January 16 at Daytona International Speedway and concluded on October 2 at Road Atlanta. This season marked the debut of the new, third-generation LMP3 cars in this series. On October 29, it been announced that the new BMW M2 Challenge cars (BMC) will be added alongside the LMP3 class in the endurance rounds.

== Classes ==
- Le Mans Prototype 3 (LMP3)
- Grand Sport X (GSX)

A new class, BMW M2 Challenge (BMC), was announced, but did not receive entries at any of their scheduled events.

The GT Daytona X (GTDX) class was open to entries, but received none across their scheduled events.

== Calendar ==
The provisional schedule was released on September 16, 2025, at IMSA's annual State of the Sport Address, featuring sixteen rounds split across ten race weekends, which will be made up of 6 Sprint and 4 Endurance rounds. All ten events had confirmed dates.

Race was part of the Airbnb Endurance Challenge

Round	Circuit	Length	Classes	Date
1	(United States) Daytona International Speedway, Daytona Beach, Florida (Grand Prix Circuit)	2 x 45 minutes	All	January 16–19
2	(United States) Circuit of the Americas, Austin, Texas (NASCAR Circuit)	2 x 45 minutes	All	February 27–28
3	(United States) Sebring International Raceway, Sebring, Florida (Grand Prix Circuit)	2 hours	LMP3	March 6–8
4	(United States) Circuit of the Americas, Austin, Texas (Grand Prix Circuit)	2 hours	LMP3	May 7–9
5	(United States) Mid-Ohio Sports Car Course, Lexington, Ohio (Grand Prix Circuit)	2 x 45 minutes	All	June 5–7
6	(United States) Virginia International Raceway, Alton, Virginia (Grand Prix Circuit)	2 hours	LMP3	June 19–21
7	(Canada) Canadian Tire Motorsport Park, Bowmanville Ontario (Grand Prix Circuit)	2 x 45 minutes	All	July 10–12
8	(United States) Road America, Elkhart Lake, Wisconsin (Grand Prix Circuit)	2 hours	LMP3	August 14–16
9	(United States) Virginia International Raceway, Alton, Virginia (Grand Prix Circuit)	2 x 45 minutes	GSX	August 21–23
10	(United States) Michelin Raceway Road Atlanta, Braselton, Georgia (Grand Prix Circuit)	2 x 45 minutes	All	September 30–October 2

== Entry list ==
=== LMP3 ===
Team	Car	Engine	No.	Drivers	Rounds
LMP3 Gen 3
(Germany) Gebhardt Motorsport	Duqueine D09	Toyota V35A-FTS 3.5 L Turbo V6	1	(Colombia) Óscar Tunjo	5–8, 10
(Germany) Gebhardt Motorsport	Duqueine D09	Toyota V35A-FTS 3.5 L Turbo V6	1	(Germany) Valentino Catalano	6, 8
(Germany) Gebhardt Motorsport	Duqueine D09	Toyota V35A-FTS 3.5 L Turbo V6	11	(United States) Danny Soufi	5–8, 10
(Germany) Gebhardt Motorsport	Duqueine D09	Toyota V35A-FTS 3.5 L Turbo V6	11	(United States) Jake Williamson	6, 8
(Canada) Shopify Racing powered by TWOth	Ligier JS P325	Toyota V35A-FTS 3.5 L Turbo V6	2	(Canada) Travis Hill	All
(Canada) Shopify Racing powered by TWOth	Ligier JS P325	Toyota V35A-FTS 3.5 L Turbo V6	2	(Canada) Nicole Havrda	3–4, 6
(Canada) Shopify Racing powered by TWOth	Ligier JS P325	Toyota V35A-FTS 3.5 L Turbo V6	2	(United States) Daniel Oliver	8
(United States) Forbush Performance	Duqueine D09	Toyota V35A-FTS 3.5 L Turbo V6	18	(France) Jules Caranta	8, 10
(United States) Forbush Performance	Duqueine D09	Toyota V35A-FTS 3.5 L Turbo V6	18	(United States) Matt Forbush	8
(United States) Toney Driver Development	Ligier JS P325	Toyota V35A-FTS 3.5 L Turbo V6	30	(United States) Brady Golan	1
(United States) Toney Driver Development	Ligier JS P325	Toyota V35A-FTS 3.5 L Turbo V6	30	(United States) Wyatt Brichacek	2
(United States) Toney Driver Development	Ligier JS P325	Toyota V35A-FTS 3.5 L Turbo V6	30	(United States) Ari Balogh	3–4, 6, 8, 10
(United States) Toney Driver Development	Ligier JS P325	Toyota V35A-FTS 3.5 L Turbo V6	30	(Canada) Garett Grist	3–4, 6, 8
(United States) Toney Driver Development	Ligier JS P325	Toyota V35A-FTS 3.5 L Turbo V6	30	(United States) Gian Buffomante	5
(United States) Toney Driver Development	Ligier JS P325	Toyota V35A-FTS 3.5 L Turbo V6	30	(United States) Bijoy Garg	7
(United States) Toney Driver Development	Ligier JS P325	Toyota V35A-FTS 3.5 L Turbo V6	95	(United States) Lincoln Day	1, 3, 5–6, 8, 10
(United States) Toney Driver Development	Ligier JS P325	Toyota V35A-FTS 3.5 L Turbo V6	95	(United States) Titus Sherlock	2, 4
(United States) Toney Driver Development	Ligier JS P325	Toyota V35A-FTS 3.5 L Turbo V6	95	(United States) Wyatt Brichacek	3–4, 6–8
(United States) Forte Racing	Ligier JS P325	Toyota V35A-FTS 3.5 L Turbo V6	77	(United States) Brian Thienes	2–8, 10
(United States) Forte Racing	Ligier JS P325	Toyota V35A-FTS 3.5 L Turbo V6	77	(Finland) Patrick Kujala	3–4, 6, 8
(United States) Forte Racing	Ligier JS P325	Toyota V35A-FTS 3.5 L Turbo V6	86	(United States) John Hirshberg	6, 8, 10
(United States) Forte Racing	Ligier JS P325	Toyota V35A-FTS 3.5 L Turbo V6	86	(United States) Patrick Liddy	6, 8
LMP3 Gen 2
(Germany) Gebhardt Motorsport	Duqueine M30 - D08	Nissan VK56DE 5.6 L V8	1	(Colombia) Óscar Tunjo	1–4
(Germany) Gebhardt Motorsport	Duqueine M30 - D08	Nissan VK56DE 5.6 L V8	1	(Germany) Valentino Catalano	3–4
(Germany) Gebhardt Motorsport	Duqueine M30 - D08	Nissan VK56DE 5.6 L V8	11	(United States) Danny Soufi	1–4
(Germany) Gebhardt Motorsport	Duqueine M30 - D08	Nissan VK56DE 5.6 L V8	11	(United States) Jake Williamson	3–4
(Germany) Gebhardt Motorsport	Duqueine M30 - D08	Nissan VK56DE 5.6 L V8	31	(Switzerland) Jérémy Siffert	1–2
(United States) Crown Racing	Ligier JS P320	Nissan VK56DE 5.6 L V8	17	(Canada) Brady Clapham	4
(United States) Crown Racing	Ligier JS P320	Nissan VK56DE 5.6 L V8	17	(United States) Chris McMurry	4
(United States) Forbush Performance	Ligier JS P320	Nissan VK56DE 5.6 L V8	18	(United States) Matt Forbush	3–4
(United States) Forbush Performance	Ligier JS P320	Nissan VK56DE 5.6 L V8	18	(United States) Tom Long	3
(United States) Forbush Performance	Ligier JS P320	Nissan VK56DE 5.6 L V8	18	(France) Jules Caranta	4
(United States) Riley	Ligier JS P320	Nissan VK56DE 5.6 L V8	29	(United States) Slade Stewart	5, 8, 10
(United States) Riley	Ligier JS P320	Nissan VK56DE 5.6 L V8	29	(United States) Andy Lee	8
(United States) Performance Tech Motorsports	Ligier JS P320	Nissan VK56DE 5.6 L V8	38	(United States) Daniel Oliver	4
(United States) Performance Tech Motorsports	Ligier JS P320	Nissan VK56DE 5.6 L V8	38	(France) Martin Bruhat	4
(Germany) Mishumotors	Ligier JS P320	Nissan VK56DE 5.6 L V8	70	(Germany) Mirco Schultis	1–2
(United States) Forte Racing	Ligier JS P320	Nissan VK56DE 5.6 L V8	77	(United States) Brian Thienes	1–2
(United States) Forte Racing	Ligier JS P320	Nissan VK56DE 5.6 L V8	86	(United States) Jon Hirshberg	1–2
(United States) FastMD with Remstar	Duqueine M30 - D08	Nissan VK56DE 5.6 L V8	87	(United States) Farhan Siddiqi	1–7
(United States) FastMD with Remstar	Duqueine M30 - D08	Nissan VK56DE 5.6 L V8	87	(United States) Jagger Jones	3–4, 6

=== GSX ===
Team	Car	Engine	No.	Drivers	Rounds
(Canada) Di Benedetto Racing	Porsche 718 Cayman GT4 RS Clubsport	Porsche MDG.GA 4.0 L Flat-6	4	(Canada) Justin Di Benedetto	1, 5, 7
(United States) KMW Motorsports with TMR Engineering	Porsche 718 Cayman GT4 RS Clubsport	Porsche MDG.GA 4.0 L Flat-6	5	(United States) Angus Rogers	10
(United States) RAFA Racing Team	Toyota GR Supra GT4 Evo2	Toyota B58H 3.0 L Turbo I6	8	(United States) Westin Workman	All
(United States) RAFA Racing Team	Toyota GR Supra GT4 Evo2	Toyota B58H 3.0 L Turbo I6	68	(El Salvador) Rafael Martinez	All
(United States) Stephen Cameron Racing	Ford Mustang GT4 (S650)	Ford Coyote 5.0 L V8	19	(United States) Sean Quinlan	1
(United States) Mad Joker Racing by Lone Star Racing	Mercedes-AMG GT4	Mercedes-Benz M178 4.0 L Turbo V8	22	(United States) Marc Austin	2
(United States) Czabok-Simpson Motorsport	Porsche 718 Cayman GT4 RS Clubsport	Porsche MDG.GA 4.0 L Flat-6	25	(United States) Ismaeel Ellahi	1, 5, 7
(United States) Auto Technic Racing	BMW M4 GT4 Evo (G82)	BMW S58B30T0 3.0 L Turbo I6	26	(United States) Tiger Tari	1–2, 7, 9–10
(United States) CarBahn Motorsports	BMW M4 GT4 Evo (G82)	BMW S58B30T0 3.0 L Turbo I6	35	(United States) Courtney Crone	All
(United States) Kingpin Racing	Toyota GR Supra GT4 Evo2	Toyota B58H 3.0 L Turbo I6	53	(United States) Rob Walker	5
(United States) Kingpin Racing	Toyota GR Supra GT4 Evo2	Toyota B58H 3.0 L Turbo I6	81	(Canada) Jon Brel	All
(United States) KohR Motorsport	Ford Mustang GT4 (S650)	Ford Coyote 5.0 L V8	58	(United States) Ray Mason	5, 7, 9–10
(United States) 89x Motorsports	Aston Martin Vantage AMR GT4	Mercedes-Benz M177 4.0 L Turbo V8	89	(United States) Mike Fitzpatrick	1
(United States) Vintage Racing Company	Porsche 718 Cayman GT4 RS Clubsport	Porsche MDG.GA 4.0 L Flat-6	91	(New Zealand) Dan Ammann	All
(Brazil) Panam Motorsport	Toyota GR Supra GT4 Evo2	Toyota B58H 3.0 L Turbo I6	98	(Brazil) Cecilia Rabelo	1, 5, 10
(Brazil) Panam Motorsport	Toyota GR Supra GT4 Evo2	Toyota B58H 3.0 L Turbo I6	98	(Brazil) Caio Chaves	7, 9
(United States) Goldcrest Motorsports	Porsche 718 Cayman GT4 RS Clubsport	Porsche MDG.GA 4.0 L Flat-6	808	(United States) Jim Jonsin	1

== Race results ==
Bold indicates overall winner.

Round		Circuit	P3 Winner	GSX Winner
1	R1	(United States) Daytona	**(Germany) #1 Gebhardt Motorsport**	(United States) #8 RAFA Racing
1	R1	(United States) Daytona	**(Colombia) Óscar Tunjo**	(United States) Westin Workman
1	R2	(United States) Daytona	**(Germany) #1 Gebhardt Motorsport**	(United States) #8 RAFA Racing
1	R2	(United States) Daytona	**(Colombia) Óscar Tunjo**	(United States) Westin Workman
2	R1	(United States) COTA	**(United States) #30 Toney Driver Development**	(United States) #8 RAFA Racing
2	R1	(United States) COTA	**(United States) Wyatt Brichacek**	(United States) Westin Workman
2	R2	(United States) COTA	**(United States) #30 Toney Driver Development**	(United States) #8 RAFA Racing
2	R2	(United States) COTA	**(United States) Wyatt Brichacek**	(United States) Westin Workman
3		(United States) Sebring	**(Germany) #1 Gebhardt Motorsport**	did not participate
3		(United States) Sebring	**(Germany) Valentino Catalano** **(Colombia) Óscar Tunjo**	did not participate
4		(United States) COTA	**(United States) #95 Toney Driver Development**	did not participate
4		(United States) COTA	**(United States) Wyatt Brichacek** **(United States) Titus Sherlock**	did not participate
5	R1	(United States) Mid-Ohio	**(Germany) #1 Gebhardt Motorsport**	(United States) #8 RAFA Racing
5	R1	(United States) Mid-Ohio	**(Colombia) Óscar Tunjo**	(United States) Westin Workman
5	R2	(United States) Mid-Ohio	**(Germany) #1 Gebhardt Motorsport**	(United States) #8 RAFA Racing
5	R2	(United States) Mid-Ohio	**(Colombia) Óscar Tunjo**	(United States) Westin Workman
6		(United States) Virginia	**(United States) #30 Toney Driver Development**	did not participate
6		(United States) Virginia	**(United States) Ari Balogh** **(Canada) Garett Grist**	did not participate
7	R1	(Canada) Mosport	**(Germany) #1 Gebhardt Motorsport**	(United States) #8 RAFA Racing
7	R1	(Canada) Mosport	**(Colombia) Óscar Tunjo**	(United States) Westin Workman
7	R2	(Canada) Mosport	**(United States) #95 Toney Driver Development**	(United States) #25 Czabok-Simpson Motorsport
7	R2	(Canada) Mosport	**(United States) Wyatt Brichacek**	(United States) Ismaeel Ellahi
8		(United States) Road America	**(United States) #95 Toney Driver Development**	did not participate
8		(United States) Road America	**(United States) Wyatt Brichacek** **(United States) Lincoln Day**	did not participate
9	R1	(United States) VIR	did not participate	**(United States) #8 RAFA Racing**
9	R1	(United States) VIR	did not participate	**(United States) Westin Workman**
9	R2	(United States) VIR	did not participate	**(United States) #8 RAFA Racing**
9	R2	(United States) VIR	did not participate	**(United States) Westin Workman**
10	R1	(United States) Road Atlanta	**(United States) #18 Forbush Performance**	(United States) #8 RAFA Racing
10	R1	(United States) Road Atlanta	**(France) Jules Caranta**	(United States) Westin Workman
10	R2	(United States) Road Atlanta	**(United States) #18 Forbush Performance**	(United States) #8 RAFA Racing
10	R2	(United States) Road Atlanta	**(France) Jules Caranta**	(United States) Westin Workman

== Championship standings ==
=== Points system ===
Championship points are awarded in each class at the finish of each event. Points are awarded based on finishing positions in the race as shown in the chart below.

Position	1	2	3	4	5	6	7	8	9	10	11	12	13	14	15	16	17	18	19	20	21	22	23	24	25	26	27	28	29	30+
Race	350	320	300	280	260	250	240	230	220	210	200	190	180	170	160	150	140	130	120	110	100	90	80	70	60	50	40	30	20	10

=== Drivers' Championships ===
==== LMP3 Drivers' Championship ====
Pos.	Drivers	DAY (United States)		AUS1 (United States)		SEB (United States)	AUS2 (United States)	MOH (United States)		VIR (United States)	MOS (Canada)		ELK (United States)	ATL (United States)		Points
1	(Colombia) Óscar Tunjo	**1**	**1**	3	3	**1**	**3**	**1**	1	**3**	1	2	**8**	2	2	4490
2	(United States) Danny Soufi	3	8	4	4	4	8	2	2	2	2	4	9	8	3	3910
3	(United States) Brian Thienes	5	2	7	7	2	2	8	8	4	6	6	7	4	5	3720
4	(Canada) Travis Hill	8	5	5	5	5	7	3	6	5	4	5	6	3	4	3690
5	(United States) Wyatt Brichacek			**1**	**1**	6	1			7	**3**	**1**	1			2540
6	(United States) Lincoln Day	4	3			6		5	3	7			1	7	6	2470
7	(United States) Farhan Siddiqi	10	6	10	8	8	4	6	7	6	7	DNS				2390
8	(United States) Ari Balogh					3	5			1			2	9	7	1690
9	(United States) Jon Hirshberg	6	9	9	DNS					8			4	6	8	1680
10	(France) Jules Caranta						6						3	**1**	**1**	1250
11	(Canada) Garett Grist					3	5			1			2			1230
12	(Germany) Valentino Catalano					**1**	**3**			**3**			**8**			1180
13	(Finland) Patrick Kujala					2	2			4			7			1160
14	(United States) Jake Williamson					4	8			2			9			1050
15	(United States) Slade Stewart							7	4				5	5	DNS	1040
16	(Germany) Mirco Schultis	9	4	6	6											1000
17	(United States) Titus Sherlock			2	2		1									990
18	(United States) Matt Forbush					7	6						3			790
19	(United States) Jagger Jones					8	4			6						760
20	(Canada) Nicole Havrda					5	7			5						760
21	(Switzerland) Jérémy Siffert	7	7	8	DNS											710
22	(United States) Bijoy Garg										5	3				560
23	(United States) Gian Buffomante							4	**5**							540
24	(United States) Brady Golan	2	10													530
25	(United States) Patrick Liddy									8			4			510
26	(United States) Daniel Oliver						10						6			460
27	(United States) Andy Lee												5			260
28	(United States) Tom Long					7										240
29	(Canada) Brady Clapham (United States) Chris McMurry						9									220
30	(France) Martin Bruhat						10									210

Colour	Result
Gold	Winner
Silver	Second place
Bronze	Third place
Green	Points classification
Blue	Non-points classification
Blue	Non-classified finish (NC)
Purple	Retired, not classified (Ret)
Red	Did not qualify (DNQ)
Red	Did not pre-qualify (DNPQ)
Black	Disqualified (DSQ)
White	Did not start (DNS)
White	Withdrew (WD)
White	Race cancelled (C)
Blank	Did not practice (DNP)
Blank	Did not arrive (DNA)
Blank	Excluded (EX)

**Bold** - Pole position
Italics - Fastest lap

==== LMP3 Drivers' Sprint Championship ====
Pos.	Drivers	DAY (United States)		AUS (United States)		MOH (United States)		MOS (Canada)		ATL (United States)		Points
1	(Colombia) Óscar Tunjo	**1**	**1**	3	3	**1**	1	1	2	2	2	3310
2	(United States) Danny Soufi	3	8	4	4	2	2	2	4	8	3	2860
3	(Canada) Travis Hill	8	5	5	5	3	5	4	5	3	4	2680
4	(United States) Brian Thienes	5	2	7	7	8	8	6	6	4	5	2560
5	(United States) Lincoln Day	4	3			5	3			7	6	1630
6	(United States) Farhan Siddiqi	10	6	10	8	6	7	7	DNS			1630
7	(United States) Wyatt Brichacek			**1**	**1**			**3**	**1**			1350
8	(United States) Jon Hirshberg	6	9	9	DNS					6	8	1170
9	(Germany) Mirco Schultis	9	4	6	6							1000
10	(United States) Slade Stewart					7	4			5	DNS	780
11	(Switzerland) Jérémy Siffert	7	7	8	DNS							710
12	(France) Jules Caranta									**1**	**1**	700
13	(United States) Titus Sherlock			2	2							640
14	(United States) Bijoy Garg							5	3			560
15	(United States) Gian Buffomante					4	**5**					540
16	(United States) Brady Golan	2	10									530
17	(United States) Ari Balogh									9	7	460

==== LMP3 Drivers' Endurance Championship ====
Pos.	Drivers	SEB (United States)	AUS (United States)	VIR (United States)	ELK (United States)	Points
1	(United States) Ari Balogh (Canada) Garett Grist	3	5	1	2	1230
2	(United States) Wyatt Brichacek	6	1	7	1	1190
3	(Germany) Valentino Catalano (Colombia) Óscar Tunjo	**1**	**3**	**3**	**8**	1180
4	(Finland) Patrick Kujala (United States) Brian Thenes	2	2	4	7	1150
5	(Canada) Travis Hill	5	7	5	6	1010
6	(United States) Danny Soufi (United States) Jake Williamson	4	8	2	9	950
7	(United States) Lincoln Day	6		7	1	840
8	(United States) Matt Forbush	7	6		3	790
9	(United States) Jagger Jones (United States) Farhan Siddiqi	8	4	6		760
10	(Canada) Nicole Havrda	5	7	5		760
11	(France) Jules Caranta		6		3	550
12	(United States) Jon Hirshberg (United States) Patrick Liddy			8	4	510
13	(United States) Daniel Oliver		10		6	460
14	(United States) Titus Sherlock		1			350
15	(United States) Andy Lee (United States) Slade Stewart				5	260
16	(United States) Tom Long	7				240
17	(Canada) Brady Clapham (United States) Chris McMurry		9			220
18	(France) Martin Bruhat		10			210

==== LMP3 Bronze Drivers' Championship ====
Pos.	Drivers	DAY (United States)		AUS1 (United States)		SEB (United States)	AUS2 (United States)	MOH (United States)		VIR (United States)	MOS (Canada)		ELK (United States)	ATL (United States)		Points
1	(Canada) Travis Hill	3	3	1	1	4	5	1	2	4	1	1	5	1	1	4450
2	(United States) Brian Thienes	1	1	3	3	1	1	4	4	3	2	2	6	2	2	4390
3	(United States) Farhan Siddiqi	5	4	5	4	6	2	2	3	5	3	DNS				2830
4	(United States) Jon Hirshberg	2	5	4	DNS					6			3	4	4	1970
5	(United States) Ari Balogh					2	3			1			1	5	3	1880
6	(Germany) Mirco Schultis	4	2	2	2											1240
7	(United States) Slade Stewart							3	1				4	3	DNS	1230
8	(United States) Jake Williamson					3	6			2			7			1110
9	(United States) Matt Forbush					5	4						2			860
10	(United States) Daniel Oliver						8						5			490
11	(Canada) Brady Clapham (United States) Chris McMurry						7									240
12	(France) Martin Bruhat						8									230

==== GSX Drivers' Championship ====
Pos.	Drivers	DAY (United States)		AUS (United States)		MOH (United States)		MOS (Canada)		VIR (United States)		ATL (United States)		Points
1	(United States) Westin Workman	**1**	**1**	**1**	**1**	**1**	**1**	**1**	**8**	**1**	**1**	**1**	**1**	4080
2	(United States) Courtney Crone	7	4	2	2	4	7	4	2	3	2	2	2	3540
3	(Canada) Jon Brel	8	9	5	7	8	5	7	4	4	3	3	7	3080
4	(El Salvador) Rafael Martinez	6	7	4	4	10	6	8	6	8	4	6	4	3030
5	(United States) Tiger Tari	11	11	6	6			10	5	6	5	7	6	2370
6	(New Zealand) Dan Ammann	5	5	7	5	7	8	6	7	7	DNS	WD	WD	2220
7	(Canada) Justin Di Benedetto	3	2			2	3	5	3					1800
8	(United States) Ismaeel Ellahi	2	10			3	4	3	1					1760
9	(Brazil) Cecilia Rabelo	9	6			6	9					5	8	1430
10	(United States) Ray Mason					9	10	9	DNS	5	DNS	8	5	1400
11	(Brazil) Caio Chaves							2	DNS	2	DNS			640
12	(United States) Marc Austin			3	3									600
13	(United States) Rob Walker					5	2							580
14	(United States) Sean Quinlan	4	3											580
15	(United States) Angus Rogers											4	3	580
16	(United States) Jim Jonsin	12	8											420
17	(United States) Mike Fitzpatrick	10	12											400

==== GSX Bronze Drivers' Championship ====
Pos.	Drivers	DAY (United States)		AUS (United States)		MOH (United States)		MOS (Canada)		VIR (United States)		ATL (United States)		Points
1	(Canada) Jon Brel	4	5	3	5	3	2	2	1	1	1	1	5	3700
2	(El Salvador) Rafael Martinez	3	3	2	2	5	3	3	3	5	2	3	2	3600
3	(United States) Tiger Tari	6	6	4	4			5	2	3	3	4	4	2800
4	(New Zealand) Dan Ammann	2	2	5	3	2	4	1	4	4	DNS	WD	WD	2710
5	(United States) Ray Mason					4	5	4	DNS	2	DNS	5	3	1700
6	(United States) Sean Quinlan	1	1											700
7	(United States) Marc Austin			1	1									700
8	(United States) Rob Walker					1	1							700
9	(United States) Angus Rogers											2	1	670
10	(United States) Jim Jonsin	7	4											520
11	(United States) Mike Fitzpatrick	5	7											500

=== Teams' Championships ===
==== LMP3 Teams' Championship ====
Pos.	Drivers	Car	DAY (United States)		AUS1 (United States)		SEB (United States)	AUS2 (United States)	MOH (United States)		VIR (United States)	MOS (Canada)		ELK (United States)	ATL (United States)		Points
1	#1 Gebhardt Motorsport	Duquine M30 - D08; Duqueine D09	**1**	**1**	3	3	**1**	**3**	**1**	1	**3**	1	3	**8**	2	2	4490
2	#95 Toney Driver Development	Ligier JS P325	4	3	2	2	6	1	4	3	7	**3**	**1**	1	7	6	4110
3	#30 Toney Driver Development	Ligier JS P325	2	10	**1**	**1**	3	5	4	**5**	1	5	3	2	9	7	4020
4	#11 Gebhardt Motorsport	Duquine M30 - D08; Duqueine D09	3	8	4	4	4	8	2	2	2	2	4	9	8	3	3910
5	#77 Forte Racing	Ligier JS P320; Ligier JS P325	5	2	7	7	2	2	8	8	4	6	6	7	4	5	3720
6	#2 Shopify Racing powered by TWOth	Ligier JS P325	8	5	5	5	5	7	3	6	5	4	5	6	3	4	3690
7	#87 FastMD with Remstar	Duqueine M30 - D08	10	6	10	8	8	4	4	7	6	7	DNS				2390
8	#86 Forte Racing	Ligier JS P320; Ligier JS P325	6	9	9	DNS					8			4	6	8	1680
9	#18 Forbush Performance	Ligier JS P320; Duqueine D09					7	6						3	**1**	**1**	1490
10	#29 Riley	Ligier JS P320							7	4				5	5	DNS	1040
11	#70 Mishumotors	Ligier JS P320	9	4	6	6											1000
12	#31 Gebhardt Motorsport	Duqueine M30 - D08	7	7	8	DNS											710
13	#17 Crown Racing	Ligier JS P320						9									220
14	#38 Performance Tech Motorsports	Ligier JS P320						10									210

==== LMP3 Teams' Sprint Championship ====
Pos.	Drivers	Car	DAY (United States)		AUS (United States)		MOH (United States)		MOS (Canada)		ATL (United States)		Points
1	#1 Gebhardt Motorsport	Duqueine M30 - D08; Duqueine D09	**1**	**1**	3	3	**1**	1	1	2	2	2	3310
2	#95 Toney Driver Development	Ligier JS P325	4	3	2	2	5	3	**3**	**1**	7	6	2920
3	#11 Gebhardt Motorsport	Duqueine M30 - D08; Duqueine D09	3	8	4	4	2	2	2	4	8	3	2860
4	#30 Toney Driver Development	Ligier JS P325	2	10	**1**	**1**	4	**5**	5	3	9	7	2790
5	#2 Shopify Racing powered by TWOth	Ligier JS P325	8	5	5	5	3	6	4	5	3	4	2680
6	#77 Forte Racing	Ligier JS P320; Ligier JS P325	5	2	7	7	8	8	6	6	4	5	2560
7	#87 FastMD with Remstar	Ligier JS P320	10	6	10	8	6	7	7	DNS			1630
8	#86 Forte Racing	Ligier JS P320	6	9	9	DNS					6	8	1170
9	#70 Mishumotors	Ligier JS P320	9	4	6	6							1000
10	#29 Riley	Ligier JS P320					7	4			5	DNS	780
11	#31 Gebhardt Motorsport	Duqueine M30 - D08	7	7	8	DNS							710
12	#18 Forbush Performance	Duqueine D09									**1**	**1**	700

==== LMP3 Teams' Endurance Championship ====
Pos.	Drivers	Car	SEB (United States)	AUS (United States)	VIR (United States)	ELK (United States)	Points
1	#30 Toney Driver Development	Ligier JS P325	3	5	1	2	1230
2	#95 Toney Driver Development	Ligier JS P325	6	1	7	1	1190
3	#1 Gebhardt Motorsport	Duqueine M30 - D08; Duqueine D09	**1**	**3**	**3**	**8**	1180
4	#77 Forte Racing	Ligier JS P325	2	2	4	7	1160
5	#11 Gebhardt Motorsport	Duqueine M30 - D08; Duqueine D09	4	8	2	9	1050
6	#2 Shopify Racing powered by TWOth	Ligier JS P325	5	7	5	6	1010
7	#18 Forbush Performance	Ligier JS P320; Duqueine D09	7	6		3	790
8	#87 FastMD with Remstar	Duqueine M30 - D08	8	4	6		760
9	#86 Forte Racing	Ligier JS P325			8	4	510
10	#29 Riley	Ligier JS P320				5	260
11	#17 Crown Racing	Ligier JS P320		9			220
12	#38 Performance Tech Motorsports	Ligier JS P320		10			210

==== GSX Teams' Championship ====
Pos.	Drivers	Car	DAY (United States)		AUS (United States)		MOH (United States)		MOS (Canada)		VIR (United States)		ATL (United States)		Points
1	#8 RAFA Racing Team	Toyota GR Supra GT4 Evo2	**1**	**1**	**1**	**1**	**1**	**1**	**1**	**8**	**1**	**1**	**1**	**1**	4080
2	#35 CarBahn Motorsports	BMW M4 GT4 Evo (G82)	7	4	2	2	4	7	4	2	3	2	2	2	3540
3	#81 Kingpin Racing	Toyota GR Supra GT4 Evo2	8	9	5	7	8	5	7	4	4	3	3	7	3080
4	#68 RAFA Racing Team	Toyota GR Supra GT4 Evo2	6	7	4	4	10	6	8	6	8	4	6	4	3030
5	#26 Auto Technic Racing	BMW M4 GT4 Evo (G82)	11	11	6	6			10	5	6	5	7	6	2370
6	#91 Vintage Racing Company	Porsche 718 Cayman GT4 RS Clubsport	5	5	7	5	7	8	6	7	7	DNS	WD	WD	2220
7	#98 Panam Motorsport	Toyota GR Supra GT4 Evo2	9	6			6	9	2	DNS	2	DNS	5	8	2070
8	#4 Di Benedetto Racing	Porsche 718 Cayman GT4 RS Clubsport	3	2			2	3	5	3					1800
9	#25 Czabok-Simpson Motorsport	Porsche 718 Cayman GT4 RS Clubsport	2	10			3	4	3	1					1760
10	#58 KohR Motorsports	Ford Mustang GT4 (2024)					9	10	9	DNS	5	DNS	8	5	1400
11	#22 Mad Joker Racing by Lone Star Racing	Mercedes-AMG GT4			3	3									600
12	#53 Kingpin Racing	Toyota GR Supra GT4 Evo2					5	2							580
13	#19 Stephen Cameron Racing	Ford Mustang GT4 (2024)	4	3											580
14	#5 KMW Motorsports with TMR Engineering	Porsche 718 Cayman GT4 RS Clubsport											4	3	580
15	#808 Goldcrest Motorsports	Porsche 718 Cayman GT4 RS Clubsport	12	8											420
16	#89 89x Motorsports	Aston Martin Vantage AMR GT4	10	12											400

=== Manufacturers' Championships ===
==== GSX Manufacturers' Championship ====
Pos.	Drivers	DAY (United States)		AUS (United States)		MOH (United States)		MOS (Canada)		VIR (United States)		ATL (United States)		Points
1	(Japan) Toyota	1	1	1	1	1	1	1	4	1	1	1	1	4130
2	(Germany) BMW	4	7	2	2	4	7	4	2	3	2	2	2	3700
3	(Germany) Porsche	2	2	7	5	2	3	5	3	7	DNS	4	3	3300
4	(United States) Ford	4	3			9	10	9	DNS	5	DNS	8	5	2280
5	(United Kingdom) Aston Martin	10	12					3	1					1190
6	(Germany) Mercedes-AMG			3	3									600
