= 2024 Mazda MX-5 Cup =

Motor racing competition

The 2024 Whelen Mazda MX-5 Cup Presented By Michelin is a single-make motor racing championship, the 20th season of the Mazda MX-5 Cup and the 4th under a new sanctioning agreement with the International Motor Sports Association (IMSA). The series began on January 24 at Daytona International Speedway, and concluded on October 11 at Michelin Raceway Road Atlanta after 14 rounds. Jared Thomas is the defending champion. Gresham Wagner became champion at season's end.

== Schedule ==
The schedule was announced on October 19, 2023, featuring 14 rounds across seven double-header weekends. All races are 45 minutes in length.

On July 17, it was announced that the Mazda MX-5 Cup would have a race at the Martinville Speedway oval, taking place on October 26. It will be a non-championship round, consisting of a 100-lap race with a break at the end of lap 50.

Round		Circuit	Location	Dates	Supporting
1	R1	Daytona International Speedway (Road Course)	Daytona Beach, Florida	January 24–26	IMSA SportsCar Championship; Michelin Pilot Challenge
1	R2	Daytona International Speedway (Road Course)	Daytona Beach, Florida	January 24–26	IMSA SportsCar Championship; Michelin Pilot Challenge
2	R3	Sebring International Raceway	Sebring, Florida	March 13–15	IMSA SportsCar Championship; Michelin Pilot Challenge; Porsche Carrera Cup North America; Lamborghini Super Trofeo North America
2	R4	Sebring International Raceway	Sebring, Florida	March 13–15	IMSA SportsCar Championship; Michelin Pilot Challenge; Porsche Carrera Cup North America; Lamborghini Super Trofeo North America
3	R5	WeatherTech Raceway Laguna Seca	Monterey, California	May 10–12	IMSA SportsCar Championship; Michelin Pilot Challenge; Lamborghini Super Trofeo North America
3	R6	WeatherTech Raceway Laguna Seca	Monterey, California	May 10–12	IMSA SportsCar Championship; Michelin Pilot Challenge; Lamborghini Super Trofeo North America
4	R7	Mid-Ohio Sports Car Course	Lexington, Ohio	June 7–9	TCR World Tour; Michelin Pilot Challenge; IMSA VP Racing SportsCar Challenge; IMSA Ford Mustang Challenge
4	R8	Mid-Ohio Sports Car Course	Lexington, Ohio	June 7–9	TCR World Tour; Michelin Pilot Challenge; IMSA VP Racing SportsCar Challenge; IMSA Ford Mustang Challenge
5	R9	Canadian Tire Motorsports Park	Toronto, Ontario, Canada	July 12–14	IMSA SportsCar Championship; Michelin Pilot Challenge; IMSA VP Racing SportsCar Challenge
5	R10	Canadian Tire Motorsports Park	Toronto, Ontario, Canada	July 12–14	IMSA SportsCar Championship; Michelin Pilot Challenge; IMSA VP Racing SportsCar Challenge
6	R11	Virginia International Raceway	Alton, Virginia	August 23–25	IMSA SportsCar Championship; Michelin Pilot Challenge; IMSA VP Racing SportsCar Challenge
6	R12	Virginia International Raceway	Alton, Virginia	August 23–25	IMSA SportsCar Championship; Michelin Pilot Challenge; IMSA VP Racing SportsCar Challenge
7	R13	Michelin Raceway Road Atlanta	(Georgia (U.S. state)) Braselton, Georgia	October 9–11	IMSA SportsCar Championship; Michelin Pilot Challenge; IMSA VP Racing SportsCar Challenge; Porsche Carrera Cup North America
7	R14	Michelin Raceway Road Atlanta	(Georgia (U.S. state)) Braselton, Georgia	October 9–11	IMSA SportsCar Championship; Michelin Pilot Challenge; IMSA VP Racing SportsCar Challenge; Porsche Carrera Cup North America
NC		Martinsville Speedway	Martinsville, Virginia	October 26	NASCAR Whelen Modified Tour

== Entry list ==
All competitors utilize the Mazda MX-5 Cup car, modified to their homologated racing specification by Flis Performance.

Team	No.	Driver		Rounds
Hendricks Motorsports	2	(United States) Jesse Love		2
McCumbee McAleer Racing	5	(United States) Gresham Wagner		All
McCumbee McAleer Racing	17	(United States) Joe Rainey	R	4–5
McCumbee McAleer Racing	22	(United States) Jeremy Fletcher		All
McCumbee McAleer Racing	27	(United States) Lev Uretsky		2
McCumbee McAleer Racing	30	(United States) Joey Rainey	R	4–5
McCumbee McAleer Racing	39	(United States) John Jodoin		All
McCumbee McAleer Racing	83	(United States) Nate Cicero		All
JTR Motorsports Engineering	6	(United States) Cody Powell	R	1–2, 4–6
JTR Motorsports Engineering	6	(United States) Kayden Kelly	R	3
JTR Motorsports Engineering	24	(United States) Aaron Jeansonne		All
JTR Motorsports Engineering	26	(United States) Peter Atwater		All
JTR Motorsports Engineering	56	(United States) Nathan Nicholson	R	1–5
JTR Motorsports Engineering	69	(United States) Anthony McIntosh		2
JTR Motorsports Engineering	78	(United States) Julian DaCosta	R	4–6
JTR Motorsports Engineering	81	(United States) James Hayosh		1–2, 4–5
JTR Motorsports Engineering	82	(United States) Woody Heimann		All
JTR Motorsports Engineering	88	(United States) Nick Shaeffer	R	1–5
JTR Motorsports Engineering	96	(United States) Jared Thomas		All
BSI Racing	13	(United States) Westin Workman	R	All
BSI Racing	32	(United States) Christian Hodneland		All
BSI Racing	54	(United States) Heather Hadley		All
BSI Racing	55	(Canada) Jonathan Neudorf		All
BSI Racing	72	(United States) Connor Zilisch		1–2, 4–5
BSI Racing	78	(United States) Julian DaCosta	R	1–3
BSI Racing	80	(United States) Ethan Tyler		1, 3, 6
BSI Racing	86	(United States) Farhan Siddiqi		6
BSI Racing	87	(United States) Selin Rollan		1–2
BSI Racing	95	(United States) Farhan Siddiqi		1–2, 4
BSI Racing	95	(United States) Jagger Jones		6
Spark Performance	15	(United States) Sally Mott	R	All
Spark Performance	33	(United States) Alex Bachoura		All
Spark Performance	50	(United States) Grant West		1–4, 6
Spark Performance	99	(United States) Noah Harmon	R	1–2
Spark Performance	99	(United States) Bryce Cornet		3
MBM Performance	16	(United States) Robert Mau	R	6
MBM Performance	44	(United States) Jon Miller	R	6
MBM Performance	46	(United States) Christopher Allen	R	6
Advanced Autosports	25	(United States) Bryan Heitman		4
Advanced Autosports	56	(United States) Nathan Nicholson	R	6
Advanced Autosports	71	(United States) Ethan Jacobs	R	4
Parker DeLong Racing	42	(United States) Parker DeLong	R	1–4, 6
Rick Ware Racing	51	(United States) Cody Ware		1
Rick Ware Racing	51	(United States) Preston Pardus		2
Rick Ware Racing	52	(United States) Preston Pardus		1
Saito Motorsport Group	19	(United States) Chuck Mactutus	R	6
Saito Motorsport Group	20	(United States) Zach Hollingshead	R	6
Saito Motorsport Group	57	(United States) Tyler Gonzalez		1–4, 6
Saito Motorsport Group	66	(United States) Wyatt Couch	R	3

R = Eligible for Rookie's Championship

== Race Results ==
Bold indicates overall winner.

Round		Circuit	Pole position	Fastest lap	Winning driver
1	R1	Daytona	#72 BSI Racing	#78 BSI Racing	#5 McCumbee McAleer Racing
1	R1	Daytona	(United States) Connor Zilisch	(United States) Julian DaCosta	(United States) Gresham Wagner
1	R2	Daytona	#96 JTR Motorsports Engineering	#22 McCumbee McAleer Racing	#83 McCumbee McAleer Racing
1	R2	Daytona	(United States) Jared Thomas	(United States) Jeremy Fletcher	(United States) Nate Cicero
2	R1	Sebring	#72 BSI Racing	#22 McCumbee McAleer Racing	#57 Saito Motorsport Group
2	R1	Sebring	(United States) Connor Zilisch	(United States) Jeremy Fletcher	(United States) Tyler Gonzalez
2	R2	Sebring	#22 McCumbee McAleer Racing	#22 McCumbee McAleer Racing	#13 BSI Racing
2	R2	Sebring	(United States) Jeremy Fletcher	(United States) Jeremy Fletcher	(United States) Westin Workman
3	R1	Laguna Seca	#24 JTR Motorsports Engineering	#24 JTR Motorsports Engineering	#96 JTR Motorsports Engineering
3	R1	Laguna Seca	(United States) Aaron Jeansonne	(United States) Aaron Jeansonne	(United States) Jared Thomas
3	R2	Laguna Seca	#24 JTR Motorsports Engineering	#22 McCumbee McAleer Racing	#24 JTR Motorsports Engineering
3	R2	Laguna Seca	(United States) Aaron Jeansonne	(United States) Jeremy Fletcher	(United States) Aaron Jeansonne
4	R1	Mid-Ohio	#5 McCumbee McAleer Racing	#96 JTR Motorsports Engineering	#72 BSI Racing
4	R1	Mid-Ohio	(United States) Gresham Wagner	(United States) Jared Thomas	(United States) Connor Zilisch
4	R2	Mid-Ohio	#5 McCumbee McAleer Racing	#5 McCumbee McAleer Racing	#5 McCumbee McAleer Racing
4	R2	Mid-Ohio	(United States) Gresham Wagner	(United States) Gresham Wagner	(United States) Gresham Wagner
5	R1	Mosport	#24 JTR Motorsports Engineering	#5 McCumbee McAleer Racing	#13 BSI Racing
5	R1	Mosport	(United States) Aaron Jeansonne	(United States) Gresham Wagner	(United States) Westin Workman
5	R2	Mosport	#96 JTR Motorsports Engineering	#72 BSI Racing	#83 McCumbee McAleer Racing
5	R2	Mosport	(United States) Jared Thomas	(United States) Connor Zilisch	(United States) Nate Cicero
6	R1	Virginia	#5 McCumbee McAleer Racing	#22 McCumbee McAleer Racing	#22 McCumbee McAleer Racing
6	R1	Virginia	(United States) Gresham Wagner	(United States) Jeremy Fletcher	(United States) Jeremy Fletcher
6	R2	Virginia	#5 McCumbee McAleer Racing	#96 JTR Motorsports Engineering	#22 McCumbee McAleer Racing
6	R2	Virginia	(United States) Gresham Wagner	(United States) Jared Thomas	(United States) Jeremy Fletcher
7	R1	Road Atlanta	#22 McCumbee McAleer Racing	#5 McCumbee McAleer Racing	#5 McCumbee McAleer Racing
7	R1	Road Atlanta	(United States) Jeremy Fletcher	(United States) Gresham Wagner	(United States) Gresham Wagner
7	R2	Road Atlanta	#83 McCumbee McAleer Racing	#13 BSI Racing	#22 McCumbee McAleer Racing
7	R2	Road Atlanta	(United States) Nate Cicero	(United States) Westin Workman	(United States) Jeremy Fletcher

== Championship Standings ==
=== Points System ===
Championship points are awarded at the finish of each event according to the chart below.

Position	1	2	3	4	5	6	7	8	9	10	11	12	13	14	15	16	17	18	19	20	21	22	23	24	25	26	27	28	29	30+
Points	350	320	300	280	260	250	240	230	220	210	200	190	180	170	160	150	140	130	120	110	100	90	80	70	60	50	40	30	20	10

=== Driver's Championship ===
IMSA recognizes driver champions based on the total number of championship points earned during the season.

Pos.	Driver	DAY		SEB		LGA		MOH		MOS		VIR		ATL		Bonus	Points
1	(United States) Gresham Wagner	1	4	3	18	6	18	**3**	**1**	10	20	**3**	**3**	1	3	90	3770
2	(United States) Jared Thomas	6	**14**	6	4	1	4	2	26	2	**8**	4	2	3	5	50	3710
3	(United States) Jeremy Fletcher	3	2	30	**3**	8	3	6	2	6	15	1	1	**19**	1	70	3700
4	(United States) Nate Cicero	28	1	4	15	3	7	4	3	4	1	6	5	5	**2**	0	3670
5	(United States) Aaron Jeansonne	4	13	7	5	**5**	**1**	5	14	**5**	4	7	14	6	9	60	3480
6	(United States) Westin Workman R	7	12	5	1	18	20	9	4	1	16	2	4	4	7	10	3420
7	(United States) Nathan Nicholson R	9	26	10	6	2	2	8	8	21	17	DNS	23	8	8	0	2610
8	(United States) Julian DaCosta R	11	22	11	28	14	9	7	15	22	2	8	7	10	17	10	2550
9	(Canada) Jonathan Neudorf	14	20	12	8	17	21	16	16	9	9	5	6	11	22	0	2480
10	(United States) John Jodoin	12	21	16	9	21	DNS	12	6	7	7	10	16	7	12	0	2470
11	(United States) Alex Bachoura	18	6	28	11	23	8	20	11	8	3	25	10	13	21	0	2310
12	(United States) Sally Mott R	25	19	19	17	20	11	13	13	13	6	13	19	23	14	0	2090
13	(United States) Connor Zilisch	**5**	25	**2**	2			1	5	3	18					60	2060
14	(United States) Peter Atwater	13	24	26	23	13	16	15	22	15	10	11	12	14	16	0	2040
15	(United States) Woody Heimann	16	11	20	25	24	10	17	12	11	5	14	24	20	25	0	2000
16	(United States) Tyler Gonzalez	2	8	1	26	16	14	27	10			23	DNS	18	6	10	1990
17	(United States) Parker DeLong R	23	10	15	29	12	15	28	17			17	8	2	10	0	1890
18	(United States) Heather Hadley	17	23	23	14	10	23	19	19	12	19	15	20	24	15	0	1810
19	(United States) Grant West	DNS	DNS	17	10	7	5	10	7			20	22	21	11	0	1800
20	(United States) Christian Hodneland	21	17	25	21	15	19	21	21	18	14	18	13	17	19	0	1750
21	(United States) Nick Shaeffer R	20	9	18	24	22	6	14	25	14	11					0	1470
22	(United States) Noah Harmon R	27	5	9	13									9	4	0	1200
23	(United States) Cody Powell R	24	16	22	19			18	18	20	13	16	25			0	1130
24	(United States) Ethan Tyler	19	7			11	13					24	15			0	970
25	(United States) James Hayosh	22	15	24	20			24	20	16	12					0	950
26	(United States) Selin Rollan	8	3	8	27											0	800
27	(United States) Preston Pardus	10	27	13	7											0	670
28	(United States) Farhan Siddiqi	26	18	29	30			23	24			22	21			0	550
29	(United States) Joey Rainey R							22	DNS	17	DNS			15	18	0	520
30	(United States) Joe Rainey R							25	DNS	19	DNS			16	20	0	440
31	(United States) Bryce Cornet					4	17									0	420
32	(United States) Ethan Jacobs R							11	9							0	420
33	(United States) Kayden Kelly R					9	12									0	410
34	(United States) Christopher Allen R											12	9			0	410
35	(United States) Frankie Barroso R													12	13	0	370
36	(United States) Jagger Jones											9	18	DNS	24	0	350
37	(United States) Robert Mau R											19	11			0	320
38	(United States) Anthony McIntosh			14	16											0	320
39	(United States) Jesse Love			21	12											0	290
40	(United States) Zach Hollingshead R											21	17			0	240
41	(United States) Wyatt Couch R					19	22									0	210
42	(United States) Cody Ware	15	28													0	190
43	(United States) Caleb Bacon R													22	23	0	170
44	(United States) Lev Uretsky			27	22											0	130
45	(United States) Bryan Heitman							26	23							0	130
–	(United States) Chuck Mactutus R											DNS	DNS			–	–
–	(United States) Jon Miller R											DNS	DNS			–	–
Pos.	Driver	DAY		SEB		LGA		MOH		MOS		VIR		ATL		Bonus	Points

Colour	Result
Gold	Winner
Silver	Second place
Bronze	Third place
Green	Points classification
Blue	Non-points classification
Blue	Non-classified finish (NC)
Purple	Retired, not classified (Ret)
Red	Did not qualify (DNQ)
Red	Did not pre-qualify (DNPQ)
Black	Disqualified (DSQ)
White	Did not start (DNS)
White	Withdrew (WD)
White	Race cancelled (C)
Blank	Did not practice (DNP)
Blank	Did not arrive (DNA)
Blank	Excluded (EX)

**Bold** - Pole position

Italics - Fastest lap

Underline = Most Laps Led

†: Post-event penalty. Car moved to back of class.

=== Entrant's Championship ===
Each entrant receives championship points for its highest car finishing position in each race. The positions of subsequent finishing cars from the same entrant are not considered in the results and all other cars are elevated in the finishing positions accordingly.

Pos.	Team	DAY		SEB		LGA		MOH		MOS		VIR		ATL	Bonus	Points
1	McCumbee McAleer Racing	1	1	3	**3**	3	3	**3**	**1**	4	1	**1**	**1**		160	4120
2	JTR Motorsports Engineering	4	**9**	6	4	**1**	**1**	2	8	**2**	**2**	4	2		110	3800
3	BSI Racing	**4**	7	**2**	1	10	9	1	4	1	9	2	4		80	3790
4	Spark Performance	18	5	9	10	4	5	10	7	8	3	13	10		0	3320
5	Saito Motorsport Group	2	8	1	26	16	14	27	10			21	17		10	2670
6	Parker DeLong Racing	23	10	15	29	12	15	28	17			17	8		0	2440
7	Rollan Racing/BSI Racing	8	3	8	27										0	1070
8	Rick Ware Racing	10	27	13	7										0	1000
9	Advanced Autosports							11	9			DNS	23		0	750
10	MBM Performance											12	9		0	540
11	Hendricks Motorsports			21	12										0	470
Pos.	Team	DAY		SEB		LGA		MOH		MOS		VIR		ATL	Bonus	Points
