= Jared Thomas (racing driver) =

American racing driver (born 1997)

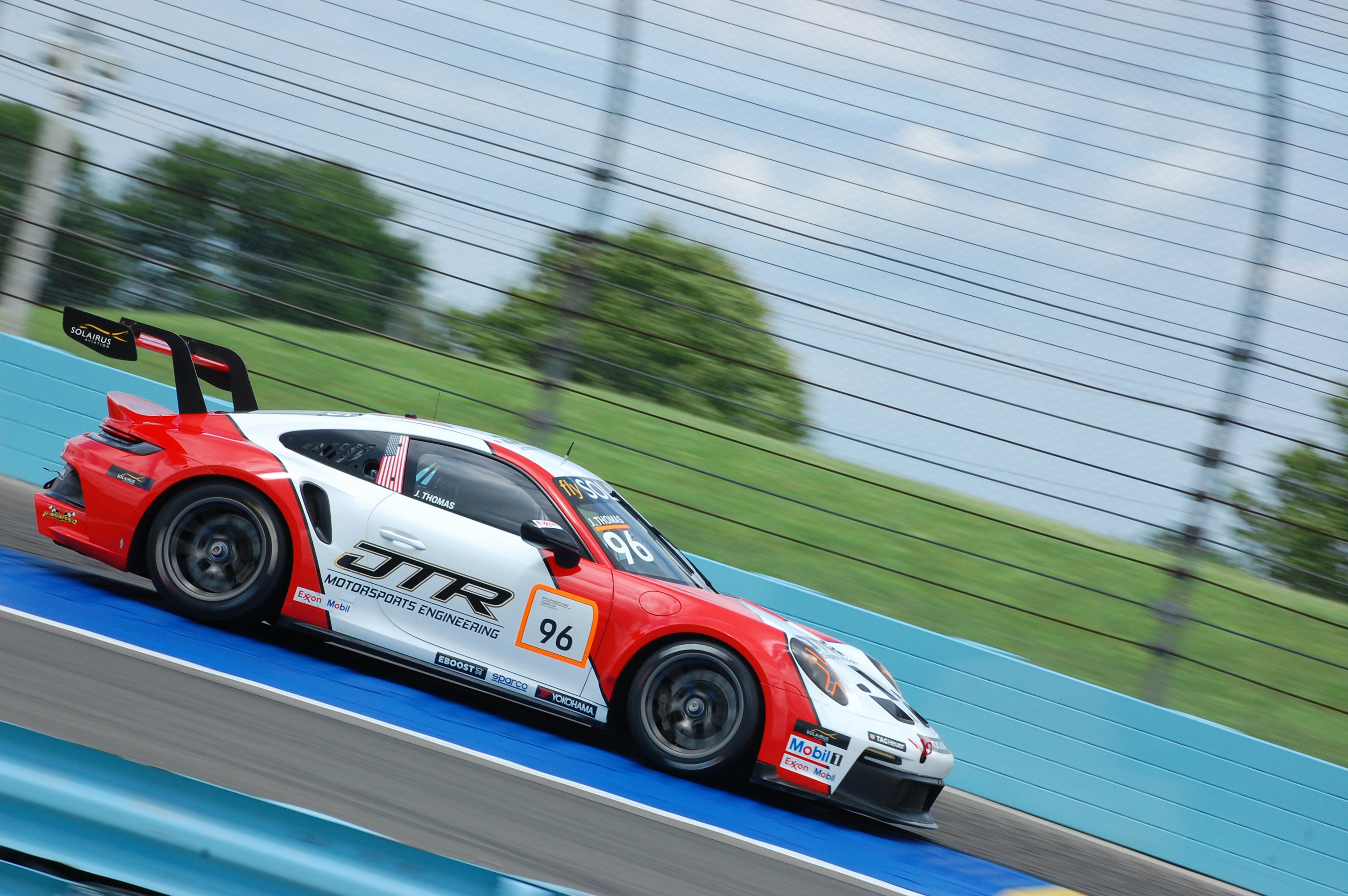
- Thomas at Watkins Glen in 2025
- Born: October 16, 1997 (age 29) North Vernon, Indiana, United States

Mazda MX-5 Cup career
- Debut season: 2020
- Current team: JTR Motorsports Engineering
- Car number: 96
- Former teams: Carter Racing Enterprises

Championship titles
- 2022, 2023 2024: Mazda MX-5 Cup; Porsche Sprint Challenge North America
- Statistics up to date as of November 15, 2024.

Jared Thomas (born October 16, 1997) is an American racing driver and team owner of JTR Motorsports Engineering who currently competes in the Mazda MX-5 Cup.

Thomas was crowned MX-5 Cup champion in consecutive seasons in 2022 and 2023, becoming the first driver in series history to score two championship titles.

== Career ==
=== Early career ===
Thomas' career began with regional Spec Miata competition, in which he competed part-time while pursuing a motorsport engineering degree at IUPUI. His 2019 Spec Miata exploits earned him an invite to the Mazda Road to 24 shootout at Michelin's Laurens Proving Grounds. At the conclusion of the December shootout weekend, Thomas was declared the winner and earned a $100,000 scholarship to compete in the 2020 Global MX-5 Cup season. In early 2020, Thomas was nominated by members of the Mazda Motorsports community to receive the 2019 Spirit of Mazda award.

=== Mazda MX-5 Cup (2020-present) ===
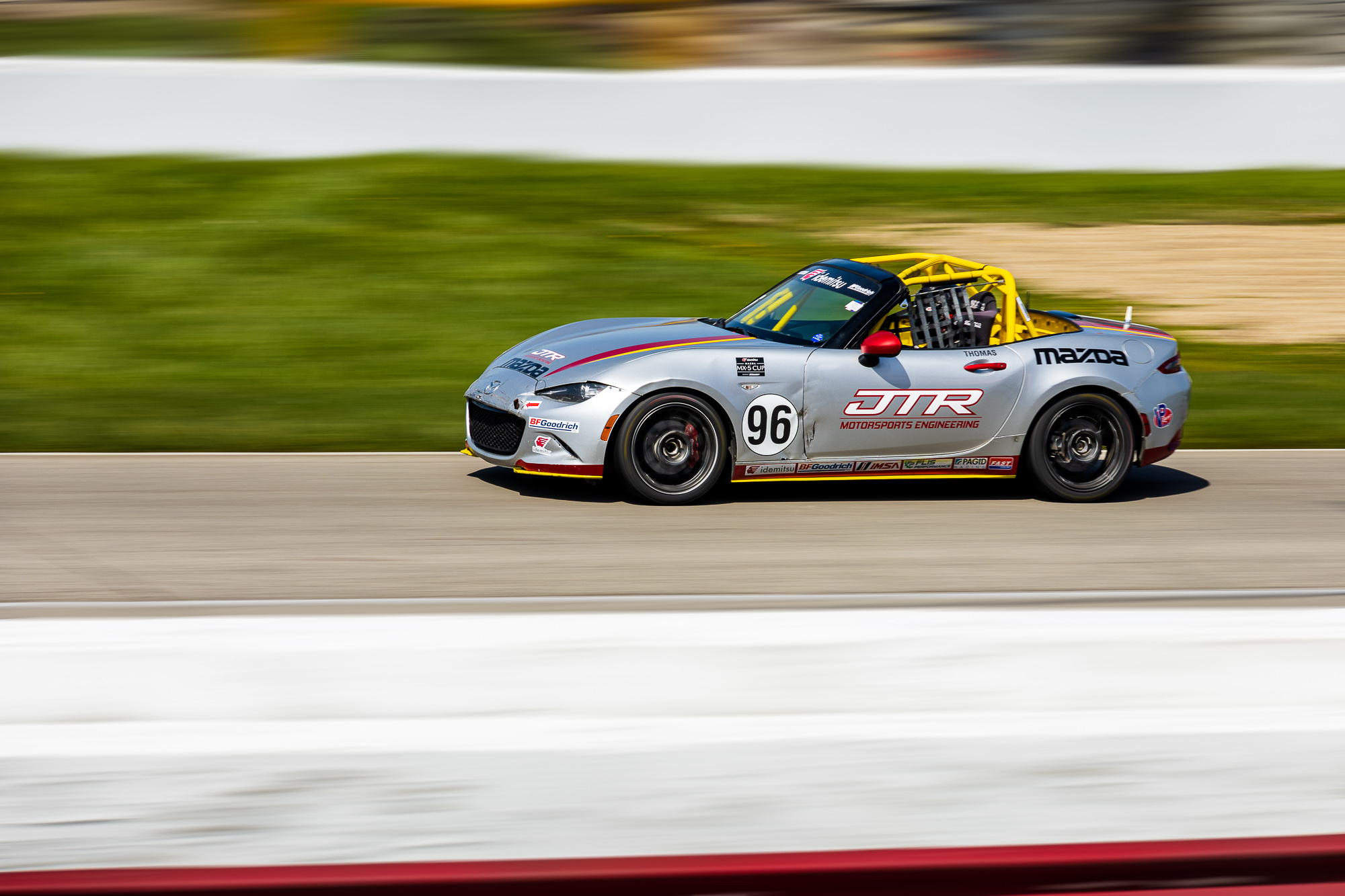
Thomas at Mid-Ohio in 2022.

Thomas' first season of pro racing saw him join 2018 Mazda scholarship winner Michael Carter's Carter Racing Enterprises operation, taking part in a full season of the Mazda MX-5 Cup. In his debut weekend at Road America, Thomas claimed a runner-up finish in the second race of the weekend. Later that season, at New Jersey Motorsports Park, Thomas claimed his maiden pole position in the series, leading the Sunday race to the green flag. Thomas enjoyed a lights-to-flag victory during the ensuing race, although the finish between himself and Gresham Wagner was the closest in series history, with just 0.0009 seconds separating the two drivers. With one victory and four podium finishes on the season, Thomas finished fourth in the championship and secured Rookie of the Year honors.

Thomas swapped teams for 2021, opening shop on his own JTR Motorsports Engineering operation. Thomas himself began the season with a pair of podium finishes in the opening weekend at Daytona. Following a difficult mid-season, with joint-best finishes of fifth at Mid-Ohio and Laguna Seca, Thomas returned to the podium in each of the final two races of the season at Road Atlanta, claiming his only victory of the year in the season finale.

Ahead of 2022, Thomas' entry began sporting a yellow roll cage, indicative of the car's past as a raffle prize for the Lemons of Love charity. Thomas acquired the car from original winner Mitch Bender in 2019, and retained its yellow highlights in order to continue representing the charity. He enjoyed a hot start to the 2022 season, taking a victory in each of the first three race meetings at Daytona, St. Petersburg, and Mid-Ohio. Following additional podium finishes in the ensuing rounds at Watkins Glen and Road America, Thomas claimed his first MX-5 Cup title, just ten points clear of championship runner-up Connor Zilisch. The $250,000 scholarship awarded to the champion was re-invested into JTR Motorsports Engineering, allowing them to field GT4 entries in the Michelin Pilot Challenge and GT4 America Series in 2023.

Thomas returned to the Mazda MX-5 Cup to defend his series title in 2023, getting off to a strong start by winning in the opening weekend at Daytona. After a difficult round at St. Petersburg, he returned with a double podium at Laguna Seca, ahead of third and fourth-place race finishes at Watkins Glen. Thomas claimed his second race victory of the season during the ensuing race weekend at Road America, helping him enter the VIR race weekend with the points lead. Following finishes of second, first, and third in the next three races, Thomas only needed to finish the season finale at Road Atlanta to claim the title. In doing so, he became the first repeat champion in series history. Thomas also entered events in the Michelin Pilot Challenge and Porsche Sprint Challenge North America during 2023. In the former, he teamed up for the opening two races of the season with Anthony McIntosh in a GS-class Mercedes-AMG GT4, registering a best finish of seventh at Daytona. In the latter, Thomas entered a pair of race weekends in a Porsche 992 GT3 Cup entry, sweeping his debut weekend at Mid-Ohio.

In 2024, Thomas embarked on full-time efforts in both MX-5 Cup and Sprint Challenge competition. Thomas' MX-5 Cup title defense started slowly, as he was forced to wait until the third race weekend of the year at Laguna Seca to stand on the podium. That would ultimately be his only race victory of the year, as four more podium finishes in the final four race meetings saw him finish second in the overall classification to Wagner. In October, Thomas claimed victory in the series' maiden oval exhibition event at Martinsville Speedway, taking home $25,000 and a Martinsville clock. Thomas' Sprint Challenge exploits proved his most fruitful in 2024, as he came home champion of the Sprint Challenge national championship, claiming 11 victories in the headline 992 Pro-Am class over the course of the 14-race season.

== JTR Motorsports Engineering ==
Using the scholarship money received from Thomas' Rookie of the Year triumph in 2020, he launched JTR Motorsports Engineering, with whom he competed in the 2021 Mazda MX-5 Cup. The North Vernon-based operation fields entries in the Mazda MX-5 Cup and Porsche Sprint Challenge North America, and formerly competed in the GT4 America Series.

In their opening season of MX-5 Cup competition, the operation expanded from a pair of cars for Thomas and Chris Nunes to a total of five part-time entries. The team fielded five entries for the majority of 2022, before bringing eight entries to the opening round of the 2023 season. At the end of 2023, the team wrapped up their first entrants championship.

In 2024, the team fielded a Porsche 718 Cayman GT4 RS Clubsport in a part-time return to the Michelin Pilot Challenge, with Thomas and Nick Shaeffer as drivers.

== Racing record ==
=== Career summary ===
Season	Series	Team	Races	Wins	Poles	F/Laps	Podiums	Points	Position
2019	SCCA Majors Championship - Spec Miata		6	0	?	?	4	120	4th
2020	Mazda MX-5 Cup	Carter Racing Enterprises	12	1	1	1	4	207	4th
2021	Mazda MX-5 Cup	JTR Motorsports Engineering	13	1	0	1	4	2750	9th
2022	Mazda MX-5 Cup	JTR Motorsports Engineering	14	3	0	2	6	3610	1st
2023	Mazda MX-5 Cup	JTR Motorsports Engineering	14	3	0	1	9	3930	1st
2023	Porsche Sprint Challenge North America - 992 Pro/Am	JTR Motorsports Engineering	4	2	0	2	4	196	6th
2023	Michelin Pilot Challenge - GS	JTR Motorsports Engineering	2	0	0	0	0	450	33rd
2024	Mazda MX-5 Cup	JTR Motorsports Engineering	14	1	1	2	5	3710	2nd
2024	Porsche Sprint Challenge North America - 992 Pro/Am	JTR Motorsports Engineering	14	11	?	10	12	799	1st
2024	Porsche Endurance Challenge North America - GT4 RS	JTR Motorsports Engineering	1	0	1	0	0	9*	40th*
2024	Michelin Pilot Challenge - GS	JTR Motorsports Engineering	2	0	0	0	0	370	40th
2024	992 Endurance Cup	Mühlner Motorsport	1	0	0	0	0	N/A	21st
2025	Mazda MX-5 Cup	JTR Motorsports Engineering	14	2	0	1	3	3040	4th
2025	Porsche Carrera Cup North America	JTR Motorsports Engineering	12	0	0	0	0	105	8th
2026	Mazda MX-5 Cup	JTR Motorsports Engineering	6	0	0	2	3	1280*	3rd*
2026	Porsche Carrera Cup North America	JTR Motorsports Engineering	16	0	0	0	5	209	5th

Sporting positions
Preceded by Gresham Wagner	Mazda MX-5 Cup; Champion; 2022, 2023	Succeeded by Gresham Wagner
