= Nathan Nicholson (racing driver) =

American racing driver

- Born: May 27, 2006 (age 20); Bloomington, Indiana, U.S.

NASCAR FedEx Freight Truck Series career
- 4 races run over 1 year
- 2026 position: 56th
- Best finish: 56th (2026)
- First race: 2026 OnlyBulls Green Flag 150 (St. Petersburg)
- Last race: 2026 FaithFest 250 (North Wilkesboro)
Wins	Top tens	Poles
0	0	0
- Statistics up to date as of November 6, 2026.

Nathan Nicholson (born May 27, 2006) is an American professional auto racing driver. He last competed part-time in the NASCAR Craftsman Truck Series, driving the No. 76 Chevrolet Silverado RST for Freedom Racing Enterprises. Nicholson additionally competes in the IMSA Mazda MX-5 Cup, driving the No. 56 for Advanced Autosports.

== Racing career ==
Nicholson began his racing career at the age of four, where he raced in go-karts. From there, he claimed multiple national karting championships, the 2022 NASA Spec Miata Championship, and the 2023 Spec MX-5 championship. It was during 2023 that he was selected as one of 12 drivers to compete in the Mazda MX-5 Cup Shootout.

In 2024, Nicholson ran the Mazda MX-5 Cup, where he started the season driving for JTR Motorsports Engineering, before moving to Advanced Autosports for the final four races of the season. He won two podiums, both of which came at Laguna Seca, and finished seventh in the final points standings.

In 2025, Nicholson remained with Advanced Autosports for the full season, where he won three podiums and finished third in the final points standings.

On January 21, 2026, it was announced that Nicholson will make his debut in the NASCAR Craftsman Truck Series at the St. Petersburg street circuit, driving the No. 76 Chevrolet for Freedom Racing Enterprises.

== Personal life ==
Nicholson is an ambassador for the Wheels to Wings Foundation.

== Motorsports career results ==
=== Stock car career summary ===
Season	Series	Team	Races	Wins	Top 5	Top 10	Points	Position
2026	NASCAR Craftsman Truck Series	Freedom Racing Enterprises	4	0	0	0	32	56th

=== NASCAR ===
(key) (Bold – Pole position awarded by qualifying time. Italics – Pole position earned by points standings or practice time. * – Most laps led.)

==== Craftsman Truck Series ====
NASCAR Craftsman Truck Series results
Year	Team	No.	Make	1	2	3	4	5	6	7	8	9	10	11	12	13	14	15	16	17	18	19	20	21	22	23	24	25	NCTC	Pts	Ref
2026	Freedom Racing Enterprises	76	Chevy	DAY	ATL	STP; 34	DAR	CAR	BRI	TEX	GLN; 20	DOV	CLT	NSH	MCH	COR; 28	LRP	NWS; 34	IRP	RCH	NHA	BRI	KAN	CLT	PHO	TAL	MAR	HOM	56th	32	
