= Westin Workman =

American racing driver (born 2004)

- Workman in 2026
- Nationality: (United States) American
- Born: September 13, 2004 (age 22) Charlotte, North Carolina, U.S.
- Categorisation: FIA Silver

Championship titles
- 2026 2025: IMSA VP Racing SportsCar Challenge – GSX; Toyota GR Cup North America – Am

Westin Workman (born September 13, 2004) is an American racing driver who last competed in the IMSA VP Racing SportsCar Challenge and GT4 America Series for RAFA Racing Team.

== Career ==
Workman began karting in 2017, competing until 2019. Following that, Workman was a finalist of the Spec MX-5 Challenge Shootout in 2020 before winning it the next year. In 2022, Workman made his single-seater debut in the Lucas Oil Formula Car Race Series, in which he finished third in points, as well as racing in the Spec MX-5 Challenge Series and being nominated as a finalist for the Mazda MX-5 Cup shootout. The following year, Workman primarily raced in the Spec MX-5 Challenge Series, and was nominated as a finalist for the 2024 IMSA Diverse Driver Development Scholarship, as well as winning the Mazda MX-5 Cup Shootout.

Joining BSI Racing as he made the step-up to the Mazda MX-5 Cup for 2024, Workman scored wins at Sebring and Mosport, as well as a second-place finish at VIR en route to a sixth-place points finish. In parallel, Workman raced in the Toyota GR Cup North America for Copeland Motorsports, as part of Toyota Racing Development's Driver Development program, scoring 11 podiums to end the year third in the overall standings and as the highest-finishing rookie. During 2024, Workman was also named as a finalist for the 2025–26 IMSA Diverse Driver Development Scholarship and finished second in the non-championship Martinsville race of the Mazda MX-5 Cup.

The following year, Workman remained with BSI Racing for a dual campaign in both the Mazda MX-5 Cup and the Toyota GR Cup North America, as he continued to be part of Toyota Driver Development's roster. In the former, Workman scored a best result of second at Barber as well as three third-place finishes to end the season 10th in points; whereas in the latter, Workman won both races at Sebring and Barber, as well as further wins at VIR and Indianapolis to secure the title at season's end. During 2025, Workman was also nominated as a finalist for the 2026–27 IMSA Diverse Driver Development Scholarship and finished second at the non-championship Martinsville race of the Mazda MX-5 Cup, 0.003 seconds behind Jeremy Fletcher.

In 2026, Workman joined RAFA Racing Team for a dual campaign in both the GSX class of the IMSA VP Racing SportsCar Challenge and the Silver Cup of the GT4 America Series. In the former, Workman began the season by winning both races at Daytona, a feat he also repeated in the following round at Circuit of the Americas to take an early championship lead. That form carried on to the next four rounds, in which Workman won all but one race to clinch the GSX title with one race to spare at Road Atlanta. Driving alongside Tyler Gonzalez in GT4 America, Workman had a similar start to the season as he won both races of the season-opening round at Sonoma. In GT4 America, Workman began the season with a double win at Sonoma, before winning at Barber and both raced at Indianapolis to miss out on the Silver class title by one point. During 2026, Workman was also named as a finalist for the 2027–28 IMSA Diverse Driver Development Scholarship, which he won in October, as well as racing in the opening round of the Mazda MX-5 Cup for Hendricks Motorsports.

== Karting record ==
=== Karting career summary ===
Season	Series	Team	Position
2018	GoPro Motorplex Challenge — KA 100 Junior		5th
2019	GoPro Motorplex Challenge — KA 100 Junior		2nd
2019	SKUSA SuperNationals — KA 100 Junior		39th

== Racing record ==
=== Racing career summary ===
Season	Series	Team	Races	Wins	Poles	F/Laps	Podiums	Points	Position
2022	Lucas Oil Formula Car Race Series		18	3	0	0	8	479	**3rd**
2022	Spec MX-5 Challenge Series							155	14th
2023	Spec MX-5 Challenge Series		11	3	0	0	5	151	
2023	Toyota GR Cup North America	Smooge Racing	2	0	0	0	1	27	15th
2023	SCCA National Championship Runoffs – Spec MX-5		2	1	0	0	1	89	**2nd**
2024	Mazda MX-5 Cup	BSI Racing	14	2	0	1	3	3420	6th
2024	Toyota GR Cup North America	Copeland Motorsports	14	0	2	1	11	211	**3rd**
2025	Mazda MX-5 Cup	BSI Racing	14	0	1	2	4	2480	10th
2025	Toyota GR Cup North America – Am	BSI Racing	14	6	0	0	12	264	**1st**
2026	Mazda MX-5 Cup	Hendricks Motorsports	2	0	0	0	0	420	37th
2026	IMSA VP Racing SportsCar Challenge – GSX	RAFA Racing Team	12	11	12	12	11	4080	**1st**
2026	GT4 America Series – Silver	RAFA Racing Team	13	5	4	4	11	258	**2nd**

=== Complete Mazda MX-5 Cup results ===
(key) (Races in bold indicate pole position. Races in italics indicate fastest race lap in class. Results are overall/class)

Year	Team	1	2	3	4	5	6	7	8	9	10	11	12	13	14	Rank	Points
2024	BSI Racing	DAY; 1; 7	DAY; 2; 12	SEB; 1; 5	SEB; 2; 1	LAG; 1; 18	LAG; 2; 20	MOH; 1; 9	MOH; 2; 4	MOS; 1; 1	MOS; 2; 16	VIR; 1; 2	VIR; 2; 4	ATL; 1; 4	ATL; 2; 7	6th	3420
2025	BSI Racing	DAY; 1; 32	DAY; 2; 22	STP; 1; 17	STP; 2; 23	BAR; 1; 3	BAR; 2; 2	MOH; 1; 30	MOH; 2; 5	MOS; 1; 5	MOS; 2; 13	VIR; 1; 3	VIR; 2; 3	ATL; 1; 15	**ATL**; **2**; 29	10th	2480
2026	Hendricks Motorsports	DAY; 1; 6	DAY; 2; 14	STP; 1	STP; 2	MOH; 1	MOH; 2	MOS; 1	MOS; 2	VIR; 1	VIR; 2	IND; 1	IND; 2	ATL; 1	ATL; 2	37th	420

* Season still in progress

=== Complete IMSA VP Racing SportsCar Challenge results ===
(key) (Races in bold indicate pole position; results in italics indicate fastest lap)

Year	Entrant	Class	Chassis	1	2	3	4	5	6	7	8	9	10	11	12	Rank	Points
2026	RAFA Racing Team	GSX	Toyota GR Supra GT4 Evo2	**DAY**; **1**; 1	**DAY**; **2**; 1	**AUS**; **1**; 1	**AUS**; **2**; 1	**MOH**; **1**; 1	**MOH**; **2**; 1	**MOS**; **1**; 1	**MOS**; **2**; 8	**VIR**; **1**; 1	**VIR**; **2**; 1	**ATL**; **1**; 1	**ATL**; **2**; 1	1st	4080
