= 2023 TC America Series =

Racing series

The 2023 TC America Series Powered by Skip Barber Racing School was the fifth season of the TC America Series. The season began at Sonoma on March 30, and ended at Indianapolis on October 8.

== Calendar ==
The preliminary calendar was released on July 29, 2022, featuring 14 races across seven rounds. In September, an updated schedule was released, postponing the event at Circuit of the Americas by two weeks and bringing the Road America round forward one week. An additional change was announced on October 17, moving the NOLA round from February 24–26 to April 28–30 to alleviate a clash with the Kyalami 9 Hours, as well as allowing the 2023 BoP test to be completed before the start of the season.

Round	Circuit	Date
1	(United States) Sonoma Raceway, Sonoma, California	March 30 – April 2
2	(United States) NOLA Motorsports Park, Avondale, Louisiana	April 28–30
3	(United States) Circuit of the Americas, Austin, Texas	May 19–21
4	(United States) Virginia International Raceway, Alton, Virginia	June 16–18
5	(United States) Road America, Elkhart Lake, Wisconsin	August 18–20
6	(United States) Sebring International Raceway, Sebring, Florida	September 22–24
7	(United States) Indianapolis Motor Speedway, Indianapolis, Indiana	October 5–8

== Entry list ==
Team	Car	No.	Drivers	Rounds
TCX entries
(United States) Fast Track Racing	BMW M2 CS Racing	09	(United States) Maddie Aust	2–7
(United States) Fast Track Racing	BMW M2 CS Racing	21	(United States) Adam Gleason	1–5, 7
(United States) Fast Track Racing	BMW M2 CS Racing	29	(United States) Nick Roberts	3, 5
(United States) AOA Racing	BMW M2 CS Racing	14	(United States) Kenny Schmied	All
(United States) AOA Racing	BMW M2 CS Racing	808	(United States) Clifton Lipple	5
(United States) AOA Racing	BMW M2 CS Racing	808	(United States) Jackson Lee	7
(United States) Kaplan Racing Systems	BMW M2 CS Racing	18	(United States) Aaron Kaplan	5
(United States) Rigid Speed Company	BMW M2 CS Racing	24	(United States) Joseph Catania	All
(United States) Rigid Speed Company	BMW M2 CS Racing	26	(United States) Lucas Catania	1–6
(United States) Rooster Hall Racing	BMW M2 CS Racing	44	(United States) Colin Garrett	All
(United States) Extreme Velocity Motorsports	BMW M2 CS Racing	45	(United States) Joseph Pizzuto	6
(United States) LA Honda World Racing	Honda Civic Type-R TCX	73	(United States) Kyle Loh	1–3
(United States) LA Honda World Racing	Honda Civic Type-R TCX	73	(United States) William Tally	4
(United States) LA Honda World Racing	Honda Civic Type-R TCX	73	(United States) Matthew Pombo	5
(United States) Ian Lacy Racing	Honda Civic Type-R TCX	93	(United States) Christopher DeFreitas	1, 4–7
(Puerto Rico) VGRT	Honda Civic Type-R TCX	99	(Japan) Daijiro Yoshihara	1–3, 5–7
TC entries
(United States) Skip Barber Racing School	Honda Civic Type-R TC	7	(Brazil) Celso Neto	All
(United States) Skip Barber Racing School	Honda Civic Type-R TC	34	(United States) Jeremiah Burton	3–7
(United States) Skip Barber Racing School	Honda Civic Type-R TC	42	(United States) Ken Fukuda	1
(Puerto Rico) VGRT	Honda Civic Type-R TC	8	(United States) Michael Hurczyn	1–4
(Puerto Rico) VGRT	Honda Civic Type-R TC	8	(Puerto Rico) Ruben Iglesias Jr.	6
(Puerto Rico) VGRT	Honda Civic Type-R TC	88	(Puerto Rico) Ruben Iglesias Jr.	7
(United States) DRS	Honda Civic Type-R TC	11	(United States) Kris Valdez	1–3, 5, 7
(United States) MINI JCW Team	Mini JCW Pro TC	37	(United States) Cristian Perocarpi	All
(United States) MINI JCW Team	Mini JCW Pro TC	60	(United States) Clayton Williams	All
(United States) GenRacer / Ricca Autosport	Hyundai Elantra N TC	78	(United States) Jeff Ricca	All
(United States) GenRacer / Ricca Autosport	Hyundai Veloster N TC	780	(United States) Sally McNulty	All
TCA entries
(United States) LA Honda World Racing	Honda Civic Si (FC1)	07	(United States) Mario Biundo	1–3, 6–7
(United States) LA Honda World Racing	Honda Civic Si (FE1)	5	(United States) Spencer Bucknum	All
(United States) Ascent Racing	Honda Civic Si (FE1)	9	(Canada) Maddy Lemke	7
(United States) Rockwell Autosport Development	Hyundai Veloster Turbo TCA	15	(United States) Eric Rockwell	4
(United States) Skip Barber Racing School	Honda Civic Si (FE1)	19	(United States) Cooper Broll	All
(United States) Skip Barber Racing School	Honda Civic Si (FE1)	77	(United States) William Lambros	All
(United States) TechSport Racing	Subaru BRZ TCA	22	(United States) Devin Anderson	All
(United States) TechSport Racing	Subaru BRZ TCA	23	(China) Shaoyi Che	All
(United States) MINI JCW Team	Mini JCW	62	(Canada) P.J. Groenke	All
(United States) MINI JCW Team	Mini JCW	63	(United States) Landon Lewis	1, 4
(United States) MINI JCW Team	Mini JCW	63	(United States) Bruce Myrehn	5, 7
(United States) MINI JCW Team	Mini JCW	64	(Canada) Alain Lauzière	1, 3
(Puerto Rico) VGRT	Honda Civic Si (FC1)	88	(Puerto Rico) Ruben Iglesias Jr.	1–5

== Race results ==
Bold indicates overall winner

Round		Circuit	Pole position	TCX Winners	TC Winners	TCA Winners
1	R1	(United States) Sonoma	(Puerto Rico) #99 VGRT	(United States) #44 Rooster Hall Racing	(United States) #78 GenRacer/Ricca Autosport	(United States) #22 TechSport Racing
1	R1	(United States) Sonoma	(Japan) Daijiro Yoshihara	(United States) Colin Garrett	(United States) Jeff Ricca	(United States) Devin Anderson
1	R2	(United States) Sonoma		(United States) #73 LA Honda World Racing	(United States) #78 GenRacer/Ricca Autosport	(United States) #22 TechSport Racing
1	R2	(United States) Sonoma		(United States) Kyle Loh	(United States) Jeff Ricca	(United States) Devin Anderson
2	R1	(United States) NOLA	(United States) #73 LA Honda World Racing	(United States) #73 LA Honda World Racing	(United States) #78 GenRacer/Ricca Autosport	(United States) #5 LA Honda World Racing
2	R1	(United States) NOLA	(United States) Kyle Loh	(United States) Kyle Loh	(United States) Jeff Ricca	(United States) Spencer Bucknum
2	R2	(United States) NOLA		(United States) #73 LA Honda World Racing	(United States) #78 GenRacer/Ricca Autosport	(United States) #5 LA Honda World Racing
2	R2	(United States) NOLA		(United States) Kyle Loh	(United States) Jeff Ricca	(United States) Spencer Bucknum
3	R1	(United States) Austin	(Puerto Rico) #99 VGRT	(United States) #26 Rigid Speed Company	(United States) #60 MINI JCW Team	(United States) #22 TechSport Racing
3	R1	(United States) Austin	(Japan) Daijiro Yoshihara	(United States) Lucas Catania	(United States) Clayton Williams	(United States) Devin Anderson
3	R2	(United States) Austin		(United States) #44 Rooster Hall Racing	(United States) #60 MINI JCW Team	(United States) #77 Skip Barber Racing School
3	R2	(United States) Austin		(United States) Colin Garrett	(United States) Clayton Williams	(United States) William Lambros
4	R1	(United States) Virginia	(United States) #26 Rigid Speed Company	(United States) #09 Fast Track Racing	(United States) #60 MINI JCW Team	(United States) #22 TechSport Racing
4	R1	(United States) Virginia	(United States) Lucas Catania	(United States) Maddie Aust	(United States) Clayton Williams	(United States) Devin Anderson
4	R2	(United States) Virginia		(United States) #09 Fast Track Racing	(United States) #60 MINI JCW Team	(United States) #62 MINI JCW Team
4	R2	(United States) Virginia		(United States) Maddie Aust	(United States) Clayton Williams	(Canada) P.J. Groenke
5	R1	(United States) Road America	(United States) #73 LA Honda World Racing	(United States) #44 Rooster Hall Racing	(United States) #78 GenRacer/Ricca Autosport	(United States) #5 LA Honda World Racing
5	R1	(United States) Road America	(United States) Matthew Pombo	(United States) Colin Garrett	(United States) Jeff Ricca	(United States) Spencer Bucknum
5	R2	(United States) Road America		(United States) #44 Rooster Hall Racing	(United States) #60 MINI JCW Team	(United States) #22 TechSport Racing
5	R2	(United States) Road America		(United States) Colin Garrett	(United States) Clayton Williams	(United States) Devin Anderson
6	R1	(United States) Sebring	(United States) #44 Rooster Hall Racing	(United States) #44 Rooster Hall Racing	(United States) #78 GenRacer/Ricca Autosport	(United States) #5 LA Honda World Racing
6	R1	(United States) Sebring	(United States) Colin Garrett	(United States) Colin Garrett	(United States) Jeff Ricca	(United States) Spencer Bucknum
6	R2	(United States) Sebring		(United States) #44 Rooster Hall Racing	(United States) #78 GenRacer/Ricca Autosport	(United States) #22 TechSport Racing
6	R2	(United States) Sebring		(United States) Colin Garrett	(United States) Jeff Ricca	(United States) Devin Anderson
7	R1	(United States) Indianapolis	(Puerto Rico) #99 VGRT	(Puerto Rico) #99 VGRT	(United States) #78 GenRacer/Ricca Autosport	(United States) #77 Skip Barber Racing School
7	R1	(United States) Indianapolis	(Japan) Daijiro Yoshihara	(Japan) Daijiro Yoshihara	(United States) Jeff Ricca	(United States) William Lambros
7	R2	(United States) Indianapolis		(Puerto Rico) #99 VGRT	(United States) #7 Skip Barber Racing School	(United States) #5 LA Honda World Racing
7	R2	(United States) Indianapolis		(Japan) Daijiro Yoshihara	(Brazil) Celso Neto	(United States) Spencer Bucknum

== Championship standings ==
Scoring system

Championship points are awarded for the first ten positions in each race. Entries are required to complete 75% of the winning car's race distance in order to be classified and earn points.

Position	**1st**	**2nd**	**3rd**	**4th**	**5th**	**6th**	**7th**	**8th**	**9th**	**10th**
Points	25	18	15	12	10	8	6	4	2	1

=== Drivers' championship ===
Pos.	Driver	Team	SON (United States)		NOL (United States)		AUS (United States)		VIR (United States)		ELK (United States)		SEB (United States)		IMS (United States)		Points
Pos.	Driver	Team	RD1	RD2	RD1	RD2	RD1	RD2	RD1	RD2	RD1	RD2	RD1	RD2	RD1	RD2	Points
TCX
1	(United States) Colin Garrett	(United States) Rooster Hall Racing	1	3	3	2	2	1	4	2	1	1	**1**	1	2	2	285
2	(United States) Lucas Catania	(United States) Rigid Speed Company	2	2	4	3	1	20	**6**	3	2	2	2	2			188
3	(United States) Maddie Aust	(United States) Fast Track Racing			5	5	3	2	1	1	Ret	DNS	3	5	6	7	148
4	(Japan) Daijiro Yoshihara	(Puerto Rico) VGRT	**Ret**	DNS	2	6	**22**	6	5	7	6	23	4	4	**1**	1	145
5	(United States) Kenny Schmied	(United States) AOA Racing	6	12	21	Ret	24	4	18	5	4	3	5	6	8	3	120
6	(United States) Adam Gleason	(United States) Fast Track Racing	4	4	20	4	4	13	2	9	Ret	DNS			3	5	105
7	(United States) Joseph Catania	(United States) Rigid Speed Company	5	6	11	DNS	6	5	3	6	5	5	6	8			103
8	(United States) Kyle Loh	(United States) LA Honda World Racing	3	1	**1**	1	5	3									90
9	(United States) Christopher DeFreitas	(United States) Ian Lacy Racing	23	19					7	8	11	9	10	7	9	6	60
10	(United States) Nick Roberts	(United States) Fast Track Racing					7	9			20	4					28
11	(United States) Joseph Pizzuto	(United States) Extreme Velocity Motorsports											7	3			21
12	(United States) Aaron Kaplan	(United States) Kaplan Racing Systems									3	22					19
13	(United States) Jackson Lee	(United States) AOA Racing													20	4	18
14	(United States) William Tally	(United States) LA Honda World Racing							21	4							14
15	(United States) Clifton Lipple	(United States) AOA Racing									24	8					10
	(United States) Matthew Pombo	(United States) LA Honda World Racing									**Ret**	DNS					0
TC
1	(United States) Clayton Williams	(United States) MINI JCW Team	8	7	9	9	8	7	8	10	**21**	6	9	10	12	9	258
2	(United States) Jeff Ricca	(United States) GenRacer / Ricca Autosport	**7**	5	6	7			**22**	22	7	7	**8**	9	4	10	249
3	(Brazil) Celso Neto	(United States) Skip Barber Racing School	13	9	7	8	**9**	10	10	11	9	11	11	13	Ret	8	197
4	(United States) Cristian Perocarpi	(United States) MINI JCW Team	9	10	8	Ret	11	8	11	14	8	10	19	11	**5**	Ret	170
5	(United States) Sally McNulty	(United States) GenRacer / Ricca Autosport	11	Ret	10	10	14	11	9	12	10	12	12	12	13	11	149
6	(United States) Jeremiah Burton	(United States) Skip Barber Racing School					13	12	12	13	12	13	13	18	10	13	96
7	(United States) Kris Valdez	(United States) DRS	12	14	12	11	12	19			13	14			7	12	91
8	(United States) Michael Hurczyn	(Puerto Rico) VGRT	10	8	**Ret**	DNS	10	Ret									42
9	(Puerto Rico) Ruben Iglesias Jr.	(Puerto Rico) VGRT											Ret	DNS	11	14	6
	(United States) Ken Fukuda	(United States) Skip Barber Racing School	DNS	DNS													0
TCA
1	(United States) Spencer Bucknum	(United States) LA Honda World Racing	15	13	**13**	12	17	15	**Ret**	16	**14**	16	**14**	15	15	15	266
2	(United States) Devin Anderson	(United States) TechSport Racing	**14**	11	22	14	15	21	13	17	15	15	18	14	**16**	16	253
3	(United States) William Lambros	(United States) Skip Barber Racing School	18	18	14	13	**16**	14	15	Ret	18	18	15	16	14	17	207
4	(China) Shaoyi Che	(United States) TechSport Racing	16	15	16	15	19	DNS	14	18	17	17	16	Ret	17	19	158
5	(Canada) P.J. Groenke	(United States) MINI JCW Team	17	16	15	Ret	18	Ret	20	15	16	24	17	17	18	18	147
6	(United States) Cooper Broll	(United States) Skip Barber Racing School	21	21	18	18	23	17	17	20	23	20			21	22	78
7	(Puerto Rico) Ruben Iglesias Jr.	(Puerto Rico) VGRT	20	20	17	16			16	19	22	21					66
8	(United States) Mario Biundo	(United States) LA Honda World Racing	19	17	19	17	21	16							22	20	65
9	(United States) Bruce Myrehn	(United States) MINI JCW Team									19	19			19	21	32
11	(Canada) Alain Lauzière	(United States) MINI JCW Team	22	23†			20	18									21
12	(United States) Eric Rockwell	(United States) Rockwell Autosport Development							19	21							14
13	(United States) Landon Lewis	(United States) MINI JCW Team	24	22													3
	(Canada) Maddy Lemke	(United States) Ascent Racing													Ret	Ret	0
Pos.	Driver	Team	SON (United States)		NOL (United States)		AUS (United States)		VIR (United States)		ELK (United States)		SEB (United States)		IMS (United States)		Points

Key
Colour	Result
Gold	Race winner
Silver	2nd place
Bronze	3rd place
Green	Points finish
Blue	Non-points finish
Blue	Non-classified finish (NC)
Purple	Did not finish (Ret)
Black	Disqualified (DSQ)
Black	Excluded (EX)
White	Did not start (DNS)
White	Race cancelled (C)
White	Withdrew (WD)
Blank	Did not participate

**Bold** – Pole
Italics – Fastest Lap
