= Eric Rockwell =

American racing driver

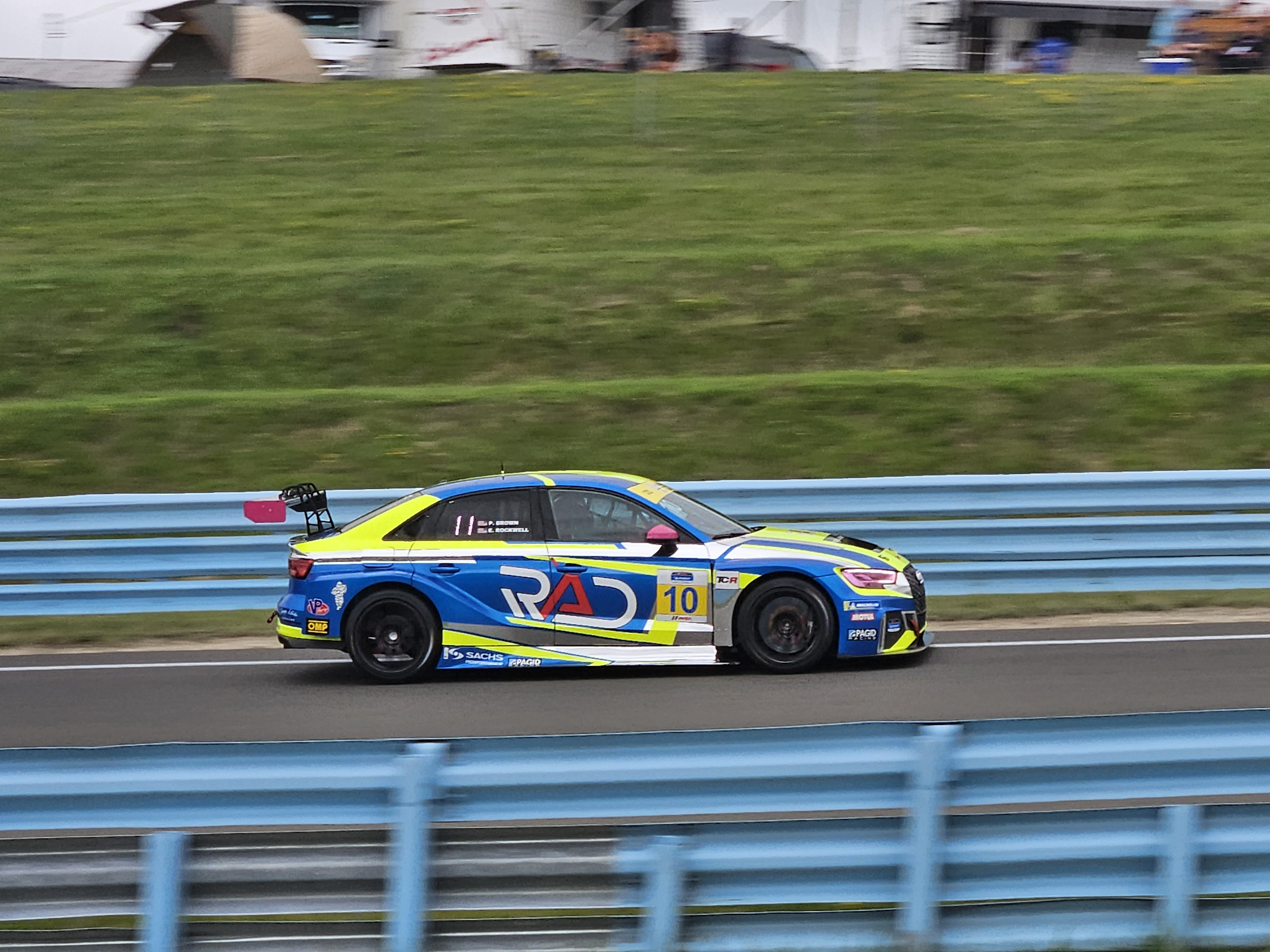
- Nationality: American
- Born: October 30, 1996 (age 30) Long Branch, New Jersey, U.S.

Michelin Pilot Challenge career
- Debut season: 2021
- Current team: Rockwell Autosport Development
- Car number: 15
- Starts: 10
- Wins: 0
- Podiums: 1
- Poles: 0
- Fastest laps: 0
- Statistics up to date as of November 3, 2022.

Eric Rockwell (born October 30, 1996) is an American racing driver who currently competes for Rockwell Autosport Development in the TCR class of the Michelin Pilot Challenge.

== Career ==
=== Early career ===
Rockwell began his racing career in 2015, competing in SCCA club racing events in touring categories. He would then move to the ChampCar Endurance Series for 2016.

=== IMSA ===
For the 2021 season, Rockwell made his professional debut at Watkins Glen International in the 2021 Michelin Pilot Challenge. He would finish ninth. He would contest two other races that season at Virginia International Raceway and Road Atlanta, finishing eighth and ninth respectively.

To begin the 2022 season, the Rockwell Autosport Development team partnered with Oldcastle Materials running under the name Belgard & Techniseal Racing, with Rockwell being named as one of the drivers in the 2022 Michelin Pilot Challenge. The season would prove to be a break out year for Rockwell, grabbing his first podium at Weathertech Raceway Laguna Seca alongside co-driver Denis Dupont. He would go on to finish 13th in the drivers standings.

In late 2022, it was announced Rockwell Autosport Development would be returning to the 2023 Michelin Pilot Challenge with a two car entry. Rockwell was announced to drive an unknown number of races.

== Personal life ==
Rockwell is a graduate of Rowan University and is currently studying dentistry at Maurice H. Kornberg School of Dentistry.

== Racing record ==
=== Career summary ===
Season	Series	Team	Races	Wins	Poles	F/Laps	Podiums	Points	Position
2021	Michelin Pilot Challenge - TCR	Rockwell Autosport Development	3	0	0	0	0	450	25th
2022	Michelin Pilot Challenge - TCR	Belgard & Techniseal Racing	7	0	0	0	1	2550	13th
2023	Michelin Pilot Challenge - TCR	Rockwell Autosport Development	8	0	0	0	0	1910	15th
2023	TC America Series - TCA	Rockwell Autosport Development	2	0	0	0	0	14	12th
2024	Michelin Pilot Challenge - TCR	Rockwell Autosport Development	2	0	0	0	0	460	25th
2025	Michelin Pilot Challenge - TCR	Rockwell Autosport Development							
