= 2023 Michelin Pilot Challenge =

Motor racing competition

The 2023 Michelin Pilot Challenge was the twenty-fourth season of the IMSA SportsCar Challenge and the tenth season organized by the International Motor Sports Association (IMSA). The season began on January 26 at Daytona International Speedway and concludes on October 14 at Road Atlanta.

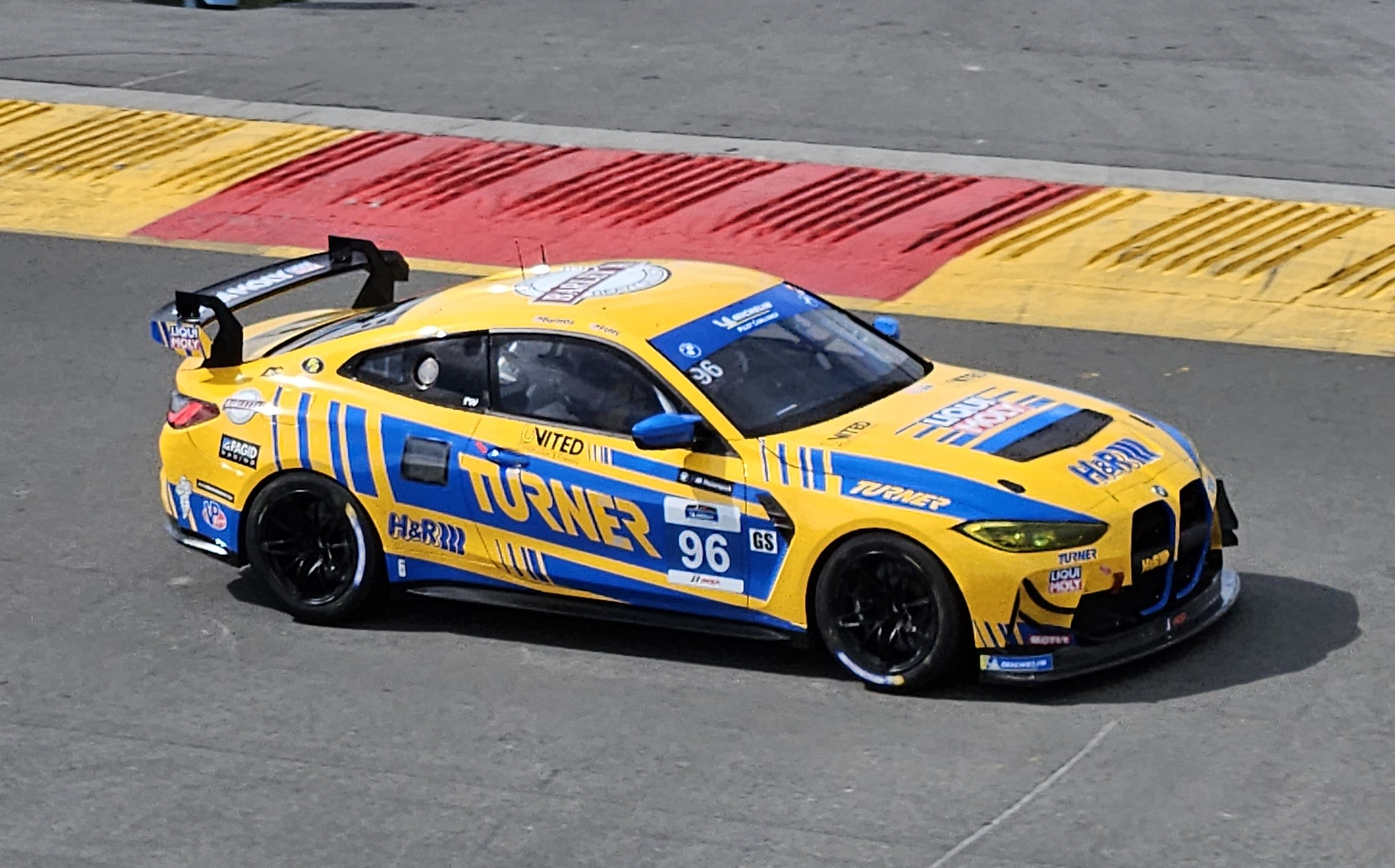
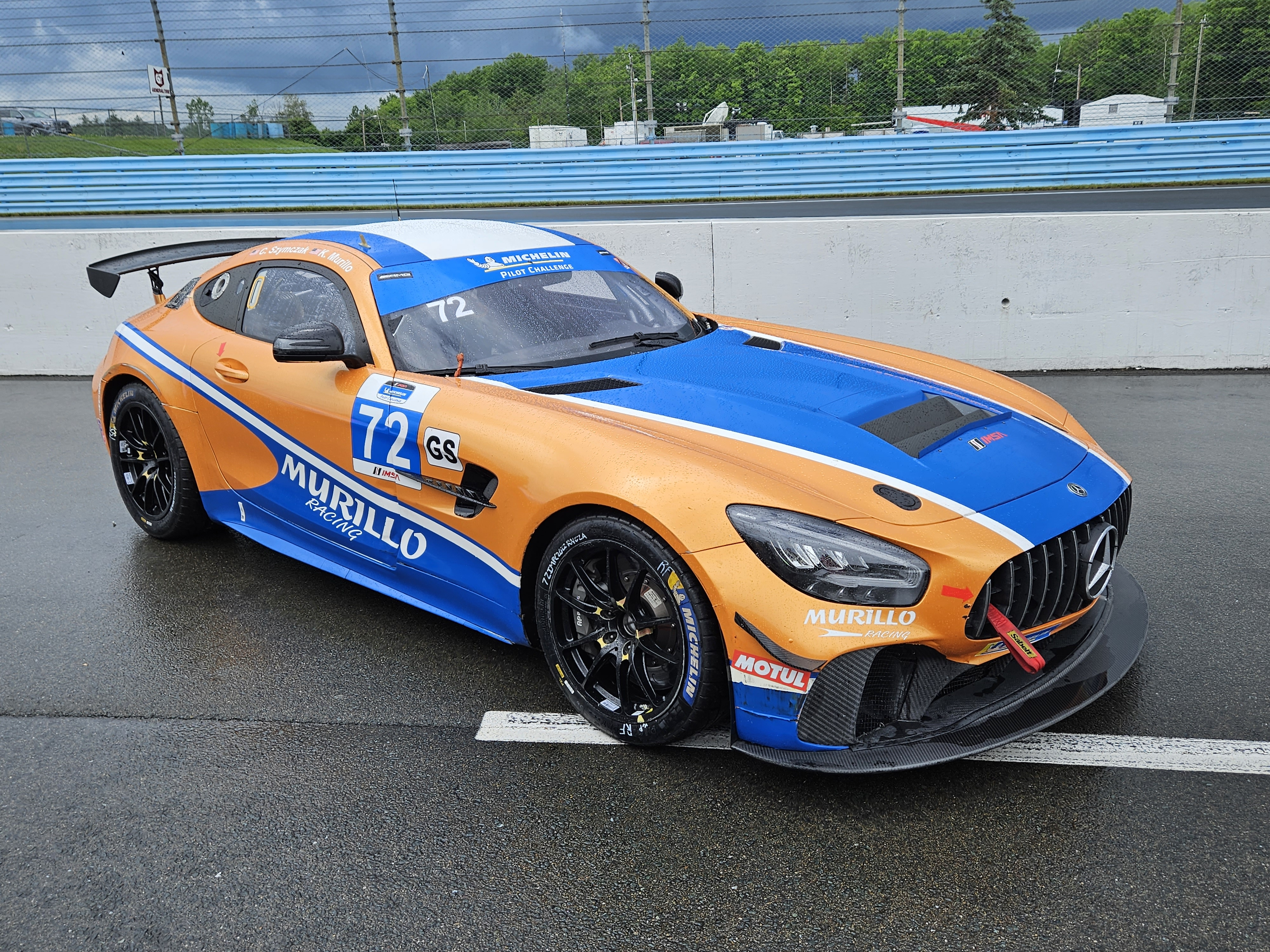
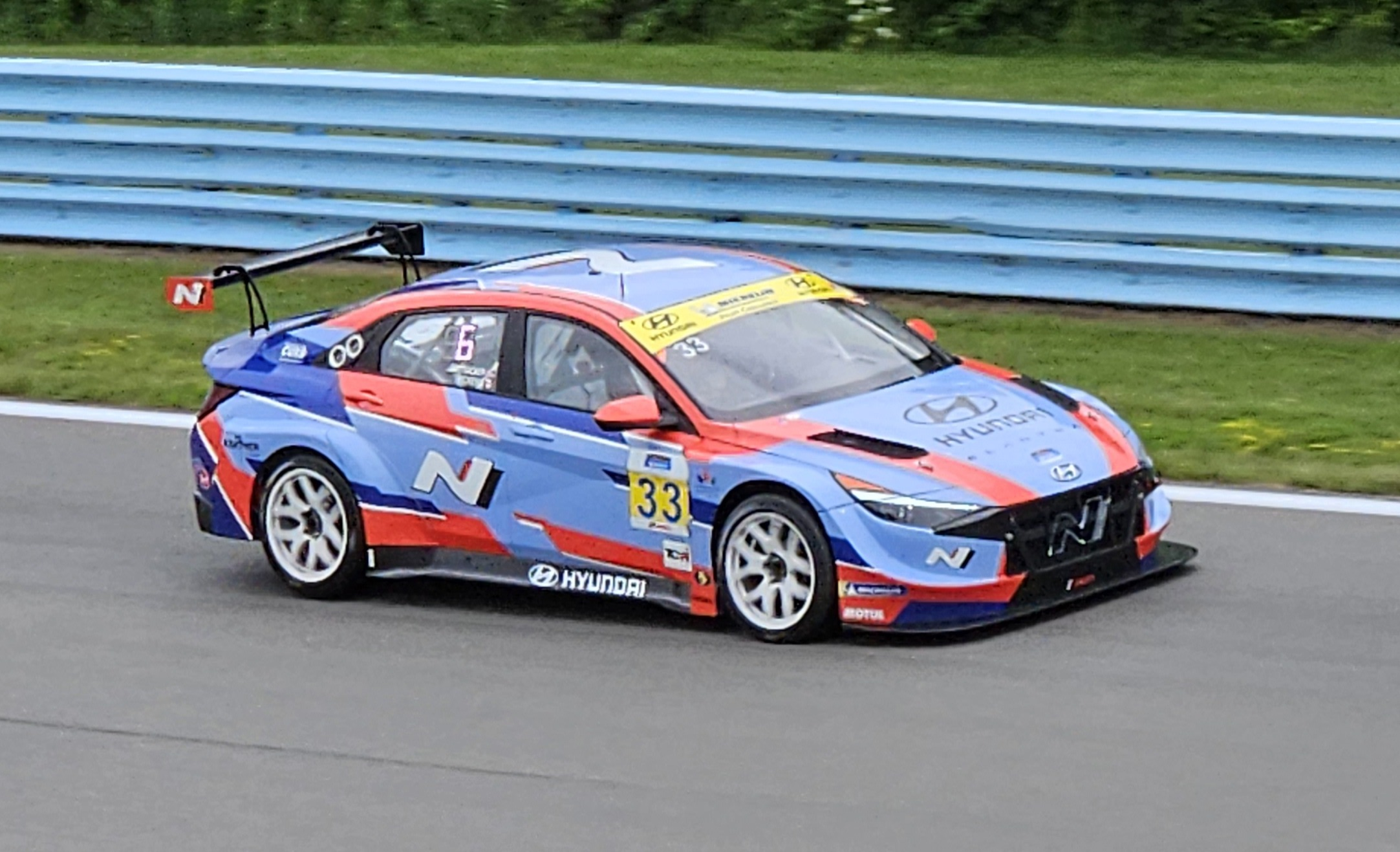
The No. 96 Turner Motorsport won the GS Teams' and Drivers' (Robby Foley and Vincent Barletta) championships.
Mercedes-AMG won the GS Manufacturers' Championship (pictured is the best-scoring Mercedes-AMG entrant, No. 72 Murillo Racing).
The No. 33 Bryan Herta Autosport w/ Curb-Agajanian won the TCR Teams' and Drivers' championships, with Hyundai winning the TCR Manufacturers' Championship.

== Classes ==
- Grand Sport (GS) (run to GT4 regulations)
- Touring Car (TCR)

== Calendar ==
The provisional 2023 calendar was released on August 5, 2022, at IMSA's annual State of the Sport Address, featuring eleven rounds.

Round	Race	Length	Classes	Circuit	Location	Date
1	BMW M Endurance Challenge	4 Hours	All	(United States) Daytona International Speedway	Daytona Beach, Florida	January 26–29
2	Alan Jay Automotive Network 120	2 Hours	All	(United States) Sebring International Raceway	Sebring, Florida	March 15–18
3	WeatherTech Raceway Laguna Seca 120	2 Hours	All	(United States) WeatherTech Raceway Laguna Seca	Monterey, California	May 12–14
4	Chevrolet Detroit Sports Car Classic	1 Hour 40 Minutes	GS	(United States) Detroit Street Circuit	Detroit, Michigan	June 2–3
5	Watkins Glen International 120	2 Hours	All	(United States) Watkins Glen International	Watkins Glen, New York	June 23–25
6	Canadian Tire Motorsport Park 120	2 Hours	All	(Canada) Canadian Tire Motorsport Park	Bowmanville, Ontario	July 7–9
7	Lime Rock Park 120	1 Hour 40 Minutes	TCR	(United States) Lime Rock Park	Lakeville, Connecticut	July 21–22
8	Road America 120	2 Hours	All	(United States) Road America	Elkhart Lake, Wisconsin	August 4–6
9	Virginia Is Racing for Lovers Grand Prix	2 Hours	All	(United States) Virginia International Raceway	Alton, Virginia	August 25–27
10	Indianapolis Motor Speedway 240	4 Hours	All	(United States) Indianapolis Motor Speedway	Speedway, Indiana	September 15–17
11	Fox Factory 120	2 Hours	All	(United States) Michelin Raceway Road Atlanta	Braselton, Georgia	October 11–14

Calendar Changes

- Mid-Ohio Sports Car Course was dropped from the calendar and was replaced by a four-hour event at Indianapolis Motor Speedway. An event at the new Detroit Street Circuit was also added to the schedule.
- The Detroit event will only feature GS-class entries, while the event at Lime Rock Park will only feature TCR entries, ensuring a 10-round schedule for both classes.

== Entry list ==
=== Grand Sport (GS) ===
Team	Car	Engine	No.	Drivers	Rounds
(United States) Automatic Racing AMR	Aston Martin Vantage AMR GT4	Aston Martin 4.0 L Turbo V8	09	(United States) Ramin Abdolvahabi	1, 5, 8
(United States) Automatic Racing AMR	Aston Martin Vantage AMR GT4	Aston Martin 4.0 L Turbo V8	09	(United States) Rob Ecklin	1, 5, 8
(United States) Automatic Racing AMR	Aston Martin Vantage AMR GT4	Aston Martin 4.0 L Turbo V8	9	(United States) Jim Jonsin	1
(United States) Automatic Racing AMR	Aston Martin Vantage AMR GT4	Aston Martin 4.0 L Turbo V8	9	(United States) Tom Long	1
(United States) Automatic Racing AMR	Aston Martin Vantage AMR GT4	Aston Martin 4.0 L Turbo V8	9	(United States) Brett Sandberg	1
(United States) Ave Motorsports	Mercedes-AMG GT4	Mercedes-AMG M178 4.0 L V8	4	(United States) Tony Ave	6
(United States) Ave Motorsports	Mercedes-AMG GT4	Mercedes-AMG M178 4.0 L V8	4	(Canada) George Staikos	6
(United States) TGR Ave Motorsports	Toyota GR Supra GT4 Evo	BMW B58B30 3.0 L Twin-Turbo I6	14	(Dominican Republic) Alfredo Najri	1–6, 9–11
(United States) TGR Ave Motorsports	Toyota GR Supra GT4 Evo	BMW B58B30 3.0 L Twin-Turbo I6	14	(Brazil) Thiago Camilo	1–5, 11
(United States) TGR Ave Motorsports	Toyota GR Supra GT4 Evo	BMW B58B30 3.0 L Twin-Turbo I6	14	(Argentina) Damian Fineschi	1
(United States) TGR Ave Motorsports	Toyota GR Supra GT4 Evo	BMW B58B30 3.0 L Twin-Turbo I6	14	(Argentina) Diego Azar	8
(United States) TGR Ave Motorsports	Toyota GR Supra GT4 Evo	BMW B58B30 3.0 L Twin-Turbo I6	14	(Paraguay) Marco Galanti	8
(United States) TGR Ave Motorsports	Toyota GR Supra GT4 Evo	BMW B58B30 3.0 L Twin-Turbo I6	14	(Argentina) Julian Santero	9
(United States) TGR Ave Motorsports	Toyota GR Supra GT4 Evo	BMW B58B30 3.0 L Twin-Turbo I6	14	(Uruguay) Fernando Etchegorry	10
(United States) TGR Ave Motorsports	Toyota GR Supra GT4 Evo	BMW B58B30 3.0 L Twin-Turbo I6	14	(Colombia) Thomas Steuer	10
(United States) Wilsports	Mercedes-AMG GT4	Mercedes-AMG M178 4.0 L V8	11	(United States) Gary Ferrera	1–3, 6, 9, 11
(United States) Wilsports	Mercedes-AMG GT4	Mercedes-AMG M178 4.0 L V8	11	(United States) Kris Wilson	1–3, 6, 9, 11
(United States) McCumbee McAleer Racing with Aerosport	Ford Mustang GT4	Ford 5.2 L Voodoo V8	13	(United States) Jenson Altzman	1–6, 8–11
(United States) McCumbee McAleer Racing with Aerosport	Ford Mustang GT4	Ford 5.2 L Voodoo V8	13	(United States) Chad McCumbee	1–3, 5–6, 8, 10–11
(United States) McCumbee McAleer Racing with Aerosport	Ford Mustang GT4	Ford 5.2 L Voodoo V8	13	(United States) Joey Hand	4, 9
(United States) van der Steur Racing	Aston Martin Vantage AMR GT4	Aston Martin 4.0 L Turbo V8	19	(United States) Austin McCusker	1–6, 8–11
(United States) van der Steur Racing	Aston Martin Vantage AMR GT4	Aston Martin 4.0 L Turbo V8	19	(United States) Rory van der Steur	1–6, 8–11
(United States) van der Steur Racing	Aston Martin Vantage AMR GT4	Aston Martin 4.0 L Turbo V8	19	(United States) Wyatt Brichacek	1
(United States) van der Steur Racing	Aston Martin Vantage AMR GT4	Aston Martin 4.0 L Turbo V8	19	(France) Valentin Hasse-Clot	10
(United States) Rearden Racing	Porsche 718 Cayman GT4 RS Clubsport	Porsche 4.0 L Flat-6	21	(United States) Vesko Kozarov	10
(United States) Rearden Racing	Porsche 718 Cayman GT4 RS Clubsport	Porsche 4.0 L Flat-6	21	(United States) Jake Pedersen	10
(United States) JTR Motorsports Engineering	Mercedes-AMG GT4	Mercedes-AMG M178 4.0 L V8	23	(United States) Anthony McIntosh	1–2
(United States) JTR Motorsports Engineering	Mercedes-AMG GT4	Mercedes-AMG M178 4.0 L V8	23	(United States) Jared Thomas	1–2
(United States) Auto Technic Racing	BMW M4 GT4 Gen II	BMW 3.0 L Twin-Turbo I6	25	(United States) JCD Dubets	1–2
(United States) Auto Technic Racing	BMW M4 GT4 Gen II	BMW 3.0 L Twin-Turbo I6	25	(United States) Rob Walker	1
(United States) Auto Technic Racing	BMW M4 GT4 Gen II	BMW 3.0 L Twin-Turbo I6	25	(United States) Bill Auberlen	2
(United States) Fast Track Racing	BMW M4 GT4 Gen II	BMW 3.0 L Twin-Turbo I6	26	(United States) Garrett Adams	1–2, 8–10
(United States) Fast Track Racing	BMW M4 GT4 Gen II	BMW 3.0 L Twin-Turbo I6	26	(United States) Toby Grahovec	1–2, 8–10
(United States) Fast Track Racing	BMW M4 GT4 Gen II	BMW 3.0 L Twin-Turbo I6	26	(United States) Neil Verhagen	1, 10
(United States) Lone Star Racing	Mercedes-AMG GT4	Mercedes-AMG M178 4.0 L V8	27	(Australia) Scott Andrews	1–6, 8–11
(United States) Lone Star Racing	Mercedes-AMG GT4	Mercedes-AMG M178 4.0 L V8	27	(United States) Anton Dias Perera	1–6, 8–11
(United States) RS1	Porsche 718 Cayman GT4 RS Clubsport	Porsche 4.0 L Flat-6	28	(United States) Eric Filgueiras	1–6, 8–11
(United States) RS1	Porsche 718 Cayman GT4 RS Clubsport	Porsche 4.0 L Flat-6	28	(United Kingdom) Stevan McAleer	1–6, 8–11
(United States) TR3 Racing	Aston Martin Vantage AMR GT4	Aston Martin 4.0 L Turbo V8	29	(United States) Jonathan Branam	1
(United States) TR3 Racing	Aston Martin Vantage AMR GT4	Aston Martin 4.0 L Turbo V8	29	(United States) John Potter	1
(United States) GMG Racing	Porsche 718 Cayman GT4 RS Clubsport	Porsche 4.0 L Flat-6	32	(Netherlands) Jeroen Bleekemolen	10
(United States) GMG Racing	Porsche 718 Cayman GT4 RS Clubsport	Porsche 4.0 L Flat-6	32	(United States) Kyle Washington	10
(United States) CarBahn with Peregrine Racing	Porsche 718 Cayman GT4 RS Clubsport 1–9; BMW M4 GT4 10–11	Porsche 4.0 L Flat-6 1–9; BMW N55 3.0 L Twin-Turbo I6 10–11	39	(United States) Sean McAlister	1–6, 8–11
(United States) CarBahn with Peregrine Racing	Porsche 718 Cayman GT4 RS Clubsport 1–9; BMW M4 GT4 10–11	Porsche 4.0 L Flat-6 1–9; BMW N55 3.0 L Twin-Turbo I6 10–11	39	(United States) Jeff Westphal	1–6, 8–11
(United States) CarBahn with Peregrine Racing	Porsche 718 Cayman GT4 RS Clubsport 1–9; BMW M4 GT4 10–11	Porsche 4.0 L Flat-6 1–9; BMW N55 3.0 L Twin-Turbo I6 10–11	39	(United States) Nolan Siegel	1–6, 8–11
(United States) CarBahn with Peregrine Racing	Porsche 718 Cayman GT4 RS Clubsport	Porsche 4.0 L Flat-6	93	(United States) Brady Golan	10
(United States) CarBahn with Peregrine Racing	Porsche 718 Cayman GT4 RS Clubsport	Porsche 4.0 L Flat-6	93	(Australia) Cameron Shields	10
(United States) PF Racing	Ford Mustang GT4	Ford 5.2 L Voodoo V8	41	(United States) Hailie Deegan	1
(United States) PF Racing	Ford Mustang GT4	Ford 5.2 L Voodoo V8	41	(United States) Ben Rhodes	1
(United States) PF Racing	Ford Mustang GT4	Ford 5.2 L Voodoo V8	42	(United States) Harrison Burton	1
(United States) PF Racing	Ford Mustang GT4	Ford 5.2 L Voodoo V8	42	(United States) Zane Smith	1
(United States) Stephen Cameron Racing	BMW M4 GT4	BMW N55 3.0 L Twin-Turbo I6	43	(United States) Greg Liefooghe	1–6, 8–11
(United States) Stephen Cameron Racing	BMW M4 GT4	BMW N55 3.0 L Twin-Turbo I6	43	(United States) Sean Quinlan	1–6, 8–11
(United States) Stephen Cameron Racing	BMW M4 GT4	BMW N55 3.0 L Twin-Turbo I6	77	(United States) Nick Shaeffer	10–11
(United States) Stephen Cameron Racing	BMW M4 GT4	BMW N55 3.0 L Twin-Turbo I6	77	(United States) Peter Mercier	10–11
(United States) Accelerating Performance	Aston Martin Vantage AMR GT4 1–8; Porsche 718 Cayman GT4 RS Clubsport 9–10	Aston Martin 4.0 L Turbo V8 1–8; Porsche 4.0 L Flat-6 9–10	44	(United States) Michael Cooper	1–4, 6, 8–11
(United States) Accelerating Performance	Aston Martin Vantage AMR GT4 1–8; Porsche 718 Cayman GT4 RS Clubsport 9–10	Aston Martin 4.0 L Turbo V8 1–8; Porsche 4.0 L Flat-6 9–10	44	Moisey Uretsky (Note: Moisey Uretsky is Russian, but he competes as a neutral competitor as Russian national emblems were banned by the FIA due to the Russian invasion of Ukraine.)	1–4, 6, 9–11
(United States) Accelerating Performance	Aston Martin Vantage AMR GT4 1–8; Porsche 718 Cayman GT4 RS Clubsport 9–10	Aston Martin 4.0 L Turbo V8 1–8; Porsche 4.0 L Flat-6 9–10	44	(United States) Justin Piscitell	1
(United States) Accelerating Performance	Aston Martin Vantage AMR GT4 1–8; Porsche 718 Cayman GT4 RS Clubsport 9–10	Aston Martin 4.0 L Turbo V8 1–8; Porsche 4.0 L Flat-6 9–10	44	(United States) Patrick Gallagher	8
(United States) Team TGM	Aston Martin Vantage AMR GT4	Aston Martin 4.0 L Turbo V8	46	(United States) Hugh Plumb	1–6, 8–11
(United States) Team TGM	Aston Martin Vantage AMR GT4	Aston Martin 4.0 L Turbo V8	46	(United States) Matt Plumb	1–6, 8–11
(United States) Team TGM	Aston Martin Vantage AMR GT4	Aston Martin 4.0 L Turbo V8	64	(United States) Ted Giovanis	1–6, 8–11
(United States) Team TGM	Aston Martin Vantage AMR GT4	Aston Martin 4.0 L Turbo V8	64	(United States) Owen Trinkler	1–6, 8–11
(United States) NOLASPORT	Porsche 718 Cayman GT4 RS Clubsport	Porsche 4.0 L Flat-6	47	(United States) Adam Adelson	1–6, 8–11
(United States) NOLASPORT	Porsche 718 Cayman GT4 RS Clubsport	Porsche 4.0 L Flat-6	47	(United States) Elliott Skeer	1–6, 8–11
(Japan) TGR Hattori Motorsports	Toyota GR Supra GT4 Evo	BMW B58B30 3.0 L Twin-Turbo I6	50	(United States) Billy Johnson	6, 11
(Japan) TGR Hattori Motorsports	Toyota GR Supra GT4 Evo	BMW B58B30 3.0 L Twin-Turbo I6	50	(Canada) Parker Thompson	6
(Japan) TGR Hattori Motorsports	Toyota GR Supra GT4 Evo	BMW B58B30 3.0 L Twin-Turbo I6	50	(United States) Seth Lucas	11
(United States) Murillo Racing	Mercedes-AMG GT4	Mercedes-AMG M178 4.0 L V8	56	(United States) Eric Foss	1–6, 8–9, 11
(United States) Murillo Racing	Mercedes-AMG GT4	Mercedes-AMG M178 4.0 L V8	56	(United States) Jeff Mosing	1–6
(United States) Murillo Racing	Mercedes-AMG GT4	Mercedes-AMG M178 4.0 L V8	56	(New Zealand) Ryan Yardley	8
(United States) Murillo Racing	Mercedes-AMG GT4	Mercedes-AMG M178 4.0 L V8	56	(United States) Justin Piscitell	9
(United States) Murillo Racing	Mercedes-AMG GT4	Mercedes-AMG M178 4.0 L V8	56	(United States) Charles Espenlaub	11
(United States) Murillo Racing	Mercedes-AMG GT4	Mercedes-AMG M178 4.0 L V8	72	(United States) Kenny Murillo	1–6, 8–11
(United States) Murillo Racing	Mercedes-AMG GT4	Mercedes-AMG M178 4.0 L V8	72	(United States) Christian Szymczak	1–6, 8–11
(United States) Winward Racing	Mercedes-AMG GT4	Mercedes-AMG M178 4.0 L V8	57	(Canada) Daniel Morad	1–6, 8–11
(United States) Winward Racing	Mercedes-AMG GT4	Mercedes-AMG M178 4.0 L V8	57	(United States) Bryce Ward	1–6, 8–11
(United States) Crucial Motorsports	McLaren Artura GT4	McLaren M630 3.0 L Turbo V6	58	(United States) Michael de Quesada	1–2
(United States) Crucial Motorsports	McLaren Artura GT4	McLaren M630 3.0 L Turbo V6	58	(United States) Aurora Straus	1–2
(United States) Crucial Motorsports	McLaren Artura GT4	McLaren M630 3.0 L Turbo V6	58	(United States) Henry O'Hara	1
(United States) Crucial Motorsports	McLaren Artura GT4	McLaren M630 3.0 L Turbo V6	85	(United States) Eric Zitza	2
(United States) Crucial Motorsports	McLaren Artura GT4	McLaren M630 3.0 L Turbo V6	85	(United States) Ron Zitza	2
(United States) KohR Motorsports	Ford Mustang GT4	Ford 5.2 L Voodoo V8	59	(United States) Luca Mars	1–6, 8–11
(United States) KohR Motorsports	Ford Mustang GT4	Ford 5.2 L Voodoo V8	59	(United States) Bob Michaelian	1–6, 8–11
(Canada) Motorsport in Action	McLaren Artura GT4	McLaren M630 3.0 L Turbo V6	69	(Canada) Alex Filsinger	1–6, 8–11
(Canada) Motorsport in Action	McLaren Artura GT4	McLaren M630 3.0 L Turbo V6	69	(Canada) Jesse Lazare	1–6, 8–11
(United States) Rebel Rock Racing	Chevrolet Camaro GT4.R	Chevrolet LT1 6.2 L V8	71	(United States) Frank DePew	1–6, 8–11
(United States) Rebel Rock Racing	Chevrolet Camaro GT4.R	Chevrolet LT1 6.2 L V8	71	(United Kingdom) Robin Liddell	1–6, 8–11
(United States) Rebel Rock Racing	Chevrolet Camaro GT4.R	Chevrolet LT1 6.2 L V8	71	(United States) Andrew Davis	1, 10
(United States) Thaze Competition	Mercedes-AMG GT4	Mercedes-AMG M178 4.0 L V8	78	(Canada) Michael Di Meo	4, 6
(United States) Thaze Competition	Mercedes-AMG GT4	Mercedes-AMG M178 4.0 L V8	78	(United States) Marc Miller	4, 6
(United States) NV Autosport	Ford Mustang GT4	Ford 5.2 L Voodoo V8	79	(United States) Drew Neubauer	1, 5, 10
(United States) NV Autosport	Ford Mustang GT4	Ford 5.2 L Voodoo V8	79	(United States) Stephen Vajda	1, 5, 10
(United States) BGB Motorsports	Porsche 718 Cayman GT4 RS Clubsport	Porsche 4.0 L Flat-6	83	(Canada) Thomas Collingwood	1–6, 8–11
(United States) BGB Motorsports	Porsche 718 Cayman GT4 RS Clubsport	Porsche 4.0 L Flat-6	83	(United States) Spencer Pumpelly	1–6, 8–11
(United States) BGB Motorsports	Porsche 718 Cayman GT4 RS Clubsport	Porsche 4.0 L Flat-6	83	(Netherlands) Jeroen Bleekemolen	1
(United States) BGB Motorsports	Porsche 718 Cayman GT4 RS Clubsport	Porsche 4.0 L Flat-6	83	(United States) John Tecce	10
(United States) Archangel Motorsports	Aston Martin Vantage AMR GT4	Aston Martin 4.0 L Turbo V8	88	(United States) Todd Coleman	1, 3–6, 8–10
(United States) Archangel Motorsports	Aston Martin Vantage AMR GT4	Aston Martin 4.0 L Turbo V8	88	(United States) Conrad Grunewald	1
(United States) Archangel Motorsports	Aston Martin Vantage AMR GT4	Aston Martin 4.0 L Turbo V8	88	(United States) Patrick Lindsey	3–4
(United States) Archangel Motorsports	Aston Martin Vantage AMR GT4	Aston Martin 4.0 L Turbo V8	88	(United States) Billy Johnson	5, 8–10
(United States) Archangel Motorsports	Aston Martin Vantage AMR GT4	Aston Martin 4.0 L Turbo V8	88	(Canada) Kyle Marcelli	6
(United States) Random Vandals Racing	BMW M4 GT4 Gen II	BMW 3.0 L Twin-Turbo I6	92	(United States) Kenton Koch	2, 8–11
(United States) Random Vandals Racing	BMW M4 GT4 Gen II	BMW 3.0 L Twin-Turbo I6	92	(United States) Paul Sparta	2, 8–11
(United States) Turner Motorsport	BMW M4 GT4 Gen II	BMW 3.0 L Twin-Turbo I6	95	(United States) Cameron Lawrence	1–6, 8–11
(United States) Turner Motorsport	BMW M4 GT4 Gen II	BMW 3.0 L Twin-Turbo I6	95	(United States) Robert Megennis	1–6, 8–11
(United States) Turner Motorsport	BMW M4 GT4 Gen II	BMW 3.0 L Twin-Turbo I6	96	(United States) Vincent Barletta	1–6, 8–11
(United States) Turner Motorsport	BMW M4 GT4 Gen II	BMW 3.0 L Twin-Turbo I6	96	(United States) Robby Foley	1–6, 8–11
(United States) Turner Motorsport	BMW M4 GT4 Gen II	BMW 3.0 L Twin-Turbo I6	96	(Germany) Jens Klingmann	1

=== Touring Car (TCR) ===
Team	Car	No.	Drivers	Rounds
(United States) Bryan Herta Autosport with Curb-Agajanian	Hyundai Elantra N TCR	1	(United States) Taylor Hagler	1–3, 5–11
(United States) Bryan Herta Autosport with Curb-Agajanian	Hyundai Elantra N TCR	1	(United States) Michael Lewis	1–3, 5–10
(United States) Bryan Herta Autosport with Curb-Agajanian	Hyundai Elantra N TCR	1	(United States) Bryson Morris	11
(United States) Bryan Herta Autosport with Curb-Agajanian	Hyundai Elantra N TCR	33	(United States) Harry Gottsacker	1–3, 5–11
(United States) Bryan Herta Autosport with Curb-Agajanian	Hyundai Elantra N TCR	33	(Canada) Robert Wickens	1–3, 5–11
(United States) Bryan Herta Autosport with Curb-Agajanian	Hyundai Elantra N TCR	98	(United States) Mason Filippi	1–3, 5–11
(United States) Bryan Herta Autosport with Curb-Agajanian	Hyundai Elantra N TCR	98	(Canada) Mark Wilkins	1–3, 5–11
(United States) KMW Motorsports with TMR Engineering	Alfa Romeo Giulietta Veloce TCR	5	(Argentina) Roy Block	1–3, 5–11
(United States) KMW Motorsports with TMR Engineering	Alfa Romeo Giulietta Veloce TCR	5	(United States) Tim Lewis Jr.	1–3, 5–11
(United States) Rockwell Autosport Development	Audi RS3 LMS TCR (2017)	10	(United States) Preston Brown	1–3, 5–11
(United States) Rockwell Autosport Development	Audi RS3 LMS TCR (2017)	10	(United States) Alex Rockwell	1, 6–11
(United States) Rockwell Autosport Development	Audi RS3 LMS TCR (2017)	10	(United States) Tom O'Gorman	1
(United States) Rockwell Autosport Development	Audi RS3 LMS TCR (2017)	10	(United States) Eric Rockwell	2–3, 5
(United States) Rockwell Autosport Development	Audi RS3 LMS TCR (2017)	10	(United States) Jeronimo Guzman	10
(United States) Rockwell Autosport Development	Audi RS3 LMS TCR (2017)	15	(Belgium) Denis Dupont	1–3, 5–11
(United States) Rockwell Autosport Development	Audi RS3 LMS TCR (2017)	15	(Canada) Nick Looijmans	1–3, 5, 9–11
(United States) Rockwell Autosport Development	Audi RS3 LMS TCR (2017)	15	(United States) Eric Rockwell	1, 6–8, 10
(United States) Unitronic/JDC-Miller MotorSports	Audi RS 3 LMS TCR (2021)	17	(United States) Chris Miller	1–3, 5–11
(United States) Unitronic/JDC-Miller MotorSports	Audi RS 3 LMS TCR (2021)	17	(South Africa) Mikey Taylor	1–3, 5–11
(United States) LA Honda World Racing	Honda Civic Type R TCR (FK8)	7	(United States) Mat Pombo	11
(United States) LA Honda World Racing	Honda Civic Type R TCR (FK8)	7	(United States) William Tally	11
(United States) LA Honda World Racing	Honda Civic Type R TCR (FK8) 1–2; Honda Civic Type R TCR (FL5) 3–9	37	(United States) Ryan Eversley	1–3, 5–9
(United States) LA Honda World Racing	Honda Civic Type R TCR (FK8) 1–2; Honda Civic Type R TCR (FL5) 3–9	37	(United States) Mat Pombo	1–3, 5–7
(United States) LA Honda World Racing	Honda Civic Type R TCR (FK8) 1–2; Honda Civic Type R TCR (FL5) 3–9	37	(United States) Mike LaMarra	8–9
(United States) LA Honda World Racing	Honda Civic Type R TCR (FK8)1–3; Honda Civic Type R TCR (FL5) 5–11	73	(United States) William Tally	1–3, 5–9
(United States) LA Honda World Racing	Honda Civic Type R TCR (FK8)1–3; Honda Civic Type R TCR (FL5) 5–11	73	(United States) Mike LaMarra	1–3, 5–7, 11
(United States) LA Honda World Racing	Honda Civic Type R TCR (FK8)1–3; Honda Civic Type R TCR (FL5) 5–11	73	(United States) Mat Pombo	8–9
(United States) LA Honda World Racing	Honda Civic Type R TCR (FK8)1–3; Honda Civic Type R TCR (FL5) 5–11	73	(United States) Ryan Eversley	11
(United States) Gou Racing	Audi RS3 LMS TCR (2017)	55	(United States) Eddie Gou	10
(United States) Gou Racing	Audi RS3 LMS TCR (2017)	55	(United States) Lalo Gou	10
(United States) Road Shagger Racing	Audi RS3 LMS TCR (2017)	61	(United Kingdom) Gavin Ernstone	1–2, 5, 10
(United States) Road Shagger Racing	Audi RS3 LMS TCR (2017)	61	(United States) Jonathan Morley	1–2, 5, 10
(United States) Deily Motorsports	Hyundai Elantra N TCR	70	(United States) Jacob Deily	1–3, 7–11
(United States) Deily Motorsports	Hyundai Elantra N TCR	70	(United States) Tyler Maxson	1
(United States) Deily Motorsports	Hyundai Elantra N TCR	70	(United States) Cabot Bigham	2–3
(United States) Deily Motorsports	Hyundai Elantra N TCR	70	(United States) Robert Megennis	7
(United States) Deily Motorsports	Hyundai Elantra N TCR	70	(United States) Sally McNulty	8–11
(United States) Deily Motorsports	Hyundai Elantra N TCR	74	(United States) Cabot Bigham	1, 7–11
(United States) Deily Motorsports	Hyundai Elantra N TCR	74	(United States) Matt Jaskol	1
(United States) Deily Motorsports	Hyundai Elantra N TCR	74	(United States) Nate Stacy	2
(United States) Deily Motorsports	Hyundai Elantra N TCR	74	(Canada) James Vance	2–3
(United States) Deily Motorsports	Hyundai Elantra N TCR	74	(United States) Jordan Wisely	3, 7–11
(United States) HART	Honda Civic Type R TCR (FK8)	89	(United States) Steve Eich	1–2, 5, 8, 10
(United States) HART	Honda Civic Type R TCR (FK8)	89	(United States) Chad Gilsinger	1–2, 5, 8, 10
(United States) HART	Honda Civic Type R TCR (FK8)	89	(Germany) Mario Farnbacher	1
(United States) HART	Honda Civic Type R TCR (FK8)	89	(United States) Tyler Chambers	10
(United States) van der Steur Racing	Hyundai Veloster N TCR	90	(United States) Rory van der Steur	7
(United States) van der Steur Racing	Hyundai Veloster N TCR	90	(United States) Luca Mars	7
(United States) van der Steur Racing	Hyundai Elantra N TCR	91	(United States) Tyler Maxson	2–3, 5–11
(United States) van der Steur Racing	Hyundai Elantra N TCR	91	(Puerto Rico) Bryan Ortiz	2–3, 5–11
(Puerto Rico) Victor Gonzalez Racing Team	Honda Civic Type R TCR (FK8) 1–7; Hyundai Elantra N TCR 8–11	99	(Puerto Rico) Victor Gonzalez	1–3, 5–11
(Puerto Rico) Victor Gonzalez Racing Team	Honda Civic Type R TCR (FK8) 1–7; Hyundai Elantra N TCR 8–11	99	(Canada) Karl Wittmer	1–3, 5–7
(Puerto Rico) Victor Gonzalez Racing Team	Honda Civic Type R TCR (FK8) 1–7; Hyundai Elantra N TCR 8–11	99	(United States) Cristian Perocarpi	8
(Puerto Rico) Victor Gonzalez Racing Team	Honda Civic Type R TCR (FK8) 1–7; Hyundai Elantra N TCR 8–11	99	(United States) Tyler Gonzalez	9–11

== Race results ==
Bold indicates overall winner.

Round	Circuit	GS Winning Car	TCR Winning Car
Round	Circuit	GS Winning Drivers	TCR Winning Drivers
1	(United States) Daytona	(United States) #42 PF Racing	(United States) #61 Road Shagger Racing
1	(United States) Daytona	(United States) Harrison Burton (United States) Zane Smith	(United Kingdom) Gavin Ernstone (United States) Jonathan Morley
2	(United States) Sebring	(United States) #96 Turner Motorsport	(United States) #5 KMW Motorsports with TMR Engineering
2	(United States) Sebring	(United States) Vincent Barletta (United States) Robby Foley	(Argentina) Roy Block (United States) Tim Lewis Jr.
3	(United States) Laguna Seca	(United States) #72 Murillo Racing	(United States) #98 Bryan Herta Autosport with Curb-Agajanian
3	(United States) Laguna Seca	(United States) Kenny Murillo (United States) Christian Szymczak	(United States) Mason Filippi (Canada) Mark Wilkins
4	(United States) Detroit	(United States) #57 Winward Racing	did not participate
4	(United States) Detroit	(Canada) Daniel Morad (United States) Bryce Ward	did not participate
5	(United States) Watkins Glen	(United States) #96 Turner Motorsport	(United States) #5 KMW Motorsports with TMR Engineering
5	(United States) Watkins Glen	(United States) Robby Foley (United States) Vincent Barletta	(Argentina) Roy Block (United States) Tim Lewis Jr.
6	(Canada) Mosport	(Japan) #50 TGR Hattori Motorsports	(United States) #17 Unitronic/JDC-Miller MotorSports
6	(Canada) Mosport	(United States) Billy Johnson (Canada) Parker Thompson	(United States) Chris Miller (South Africa) Mikey Taylor
7	(United States) Lime Rock	did not participate	(United States) #98 Bryan Herta Autosport with Curb-Agajanian
7	(United States) Lime Rock	did not participate	(United States) Mason Filippi (Canada) Mark Wilkins
8	(United States) Road America	(United States) #71 Rebel Rock Racing	(United States) #5 KMW Motorsports with TMR Engineering
8	(United States) Road America	(United States) Frank DePew (United Kingdom) Robin Liddell	(Argentina) Roy Block (United States) Tim Lewis Jr.
9	(United States) Virginia	(United States) #71 Rebel Rock Racing	(United States) #17 Unitronic/JDC-Miller MotorSports
9	(United States) Virginia	(United States) Frank DePew (United Kingdom) Robin Liddell	(United States) Chris Miller (South Africa) Mikey Taylor
10	(United States) Indianapolis	(United States) #57 Winward Racing	(United States) #17 Unitronic/JDC-Miller MotorSports
10	(United States) Indianapolis	(Canada) Daniel Morad (United States) Bryce Ward	(United States) Chris Miller (South Africa) Mikey Taylor
11	(United States) Road Atlanta	(Canada) #69 Motorsport in Action	(United States) #98 Bryan Herta Autosport with Curb-Agajanian
11	(United States) Road Atlanta	(Canada) Alex Filsinger (Canada) Jesse Lazare	(United States) Mason Filippi (Canada) Mark Wilkins

== Championship standings ==
=== Points system ===
Championship points are awarded in each class at the finish of each event. Points are awarded based on finishing positions in the race as shown in the chart below.

Position	1	2	3	4	5	6	7	8	9	10	11	12	13	14	15	16	17	18	19	20	21	22	23	24	25	26	27	28	29	30+
Race	350	320	300	280	260	250	240	230	220	210	200	190	180	170	160	150	140	130	120	110	100	90	80	70	60	50	40	30	20	10

=== GS Driver's Championship ===
Pos.	Drivers	DAY (United States)	SEB (United States)	LGA (United States)	DET (United States)	WGL (United States)	MOS (Canada)	ELK (United States)	VIR (United States)	IMS (United States)	ATL (United States)	Points
1	(United States) Vincent Barletta (United States) Robby Foley	18	1	12	9	1	18	4	2	5	11	2430
2	(United States) Frank DePew (United Kingdom) Robin Liddell	32	3	10	14	13	2	1	1	4	6	2420
3	(United States) Kenny Murillo (United States) Christian Szymczak	4	18	1	7	**3**	7	10	8	13	8	2390
4	(United States) Eric Filgueiras (United Kingdom) Stevan McAleer	**30**	6	2	2	12	11	8	19	7	3	2180
5	(United States) Adam Adelson (United States) Elliott Skeer	25	5	4	6	19	10	6	4	16	2	2180
6	(Canada) Thomas Collingwood (United States) Spencer Pumpelly	2	24	5	8	7	12	23	6	6	20	2000
7	(United States) Jenson Altzman	22	14	8	11	15	19	3	3	8	23	1880
8	(United States) Hugh Plumb (United States) Matt Plumb	9	8	17	12	9	6	19	9	24	9	1880
9	(United States) Sean McAlister (United States) Jeff Westphal	27	12	7	4	8	9	9	17	9	22	1870
10	(Australia) Scott Andrews (United States) Anton Dias Perera	15	4	21†	18	16	5	17	18	2	13	1850
11	(United States) Eric Foss	8	7	18	5	5	21	11	10		10	1840
12	(United States) Austin McCusker (United States) Rory van der Steur	12	19	**11**	19	6	3	15	15	12	19	1810
13	(United States) Cameron Lawrence (United States) Robert Megennis	26	2	9	**20**	2	24†	7	**11**	11	24†	1800
14	(Canada) Daniel Morad (United States) Bryce Ward	24	26	3	1	18	23	24†	20	1	5	1770
15	(Canada) Alex Filsinger (Canada) Jesse Lazare	21	16	13	13	10	17	21	13	**15**	**1**	1750
16	(United States) Luca Mars (United States) Bob Michaelian	23	17	20	16	DNS	13	2	5	10	4	1730
17	(United States) Greg Liefooghe (United States) Sean Quinlan	13	9	6	17	17	14	12	16	17	18	1710
18	(United States) Michael Cooper	10	11	15	10		22	16	7	19	15	1540
19	Moisey Uretsky	10	11	15	10		22		7	19	15	1390
20	(United States) Chad McCumbee	22	14	8		15	19	3		8	23	1380
21	(United States) Ted Giovanis (United States) Owen Trinkler	19	15	16	22	20†	15	14	21	25	14	1290
22	(United States) Jeff Mosing	8	7	18	5	5	21					1220
23	(United States) Todd Coleman	11		14	15	21†	8	20	22	22		1150
24	(Dominican Republic) Alfredo Najri	30	13	19	21	4			12	26	16	1080
25	(United States) Kenton Koch (United States) Paul Sparta		27†					5	24†	3	7	910
26	(United States) Billy Johnson					21†	**1**	20	22	22	17	880
27	(Brazil) Thiago Camilo	30	13	19	21	4					16	840
28	(United States) Gary Ferrera (United States) Kris Wilson	16	21	DNS			20		23		12	630
29	(United States) Garrett Adams (United States) Toby Grahovec	29	20					13	14	18		610
30	(United States) Marc Miller (Canada) Michael Di Meo				3		4					580
31	(United States) Joey Hand				11				3			500
32	(Netherlands) Jeroen Bleekemolen	2								14		490
33	(United States) Anthony McIntosh (United States) Jared Thomas	7	10									450
34	(United States) Ramin Abdolvahabi (United States) Rob Ecklin	17				11		22				430
35	(United States) Justin Piscitell	10							10			420
36	(United States) Drew Neubauer (United States) Stephen Vajda	20				14				23		360
37	(United States) Harrison Burton (United States) Zane Smith	1										350
38	(Canada) Parker Thompson						**1**					350
39	(United States) Michael de Quesada (United States) Aurora Straus	6	23									330
40	(United States) Patrick Lindsey			14	15							330
41	(United States) Hailie Deegan (United States) Ben Rhodes	3										300
42	(United States) Andrew Davis	32								4		290
43	(United States) Jim Jonsin (United States) Tom Long (United States) Brett Sandberg	5										260
44	(United States) Nolan Siegel	27								9		260
45	(United States) Henry O'Hara	6										250
46	(United States) John Tecce									6		250
47	(Canada) Kyle Marcelli						8					230
48	(United States) Charles Espenlaub										10	210
49	(United States) Conrad Grunewald	11										200
50	(New Zealand) Ryan Yardley							11				200
50	(United States) Peter Mercier (United States) Nick Shaeffer									21	21	200
52	(United States) Wyatt Brichacek	12										190
53	(Argentina) Julian Santero								12			190
54	(France) Valentin Hasse-Clot									12		190
55	(United States) Jonathan Branam (United States) John Potter	14										170
56	(United States) Kyle Washington									14		170
57	(Canada) George Staikos (United States) Tony Ave						16					150
58	(United States) Patrick Gallagher							16				150
59	(United States) Neil Verhagen	29								18		150
60	(United States) Seth Lucas										17	140
61	(Germany) Jens Klingmann	18										130
62	(Argentina) Diego Azar (Paraguay) Marco Galanti							18				130
63	(United States) John Capestro-Dubets	28	22									120
64	(United States) Vesko Kozarov (United States) Jake Pedersen									20		110
65	(United States) Bill Auberlen		22									90
66	(United States) Eric Zitza (United States) Ron Zitza		25									60
67	(Uruguay) Fernando Etchegorry (Colombia) Thomas Steuer									26		50
68	(United States) Brady Golan (Australia) Cameron Shields									27		40
69	(United States) Rob Walker	28										30
70	(Argentina) Damian Fineschi	31										10

Colour	Result
Gold	Winner
Silver	Second place
Bronze	Third place
Green	Points classification
Blue	Non-points classification
Blue	Non-classified finish (NC)
Purple	Retired, not classified (Ret)
Red	Did not qualify (DNQ)
Red	Did not pre-qualify (DNPQ)
Black	Disqualified (DSQ)
White	Did not start (DNS)
White	Withdrew (WD)
White	Race cancelled (C)
Blank	Did not practice (DNP)
Blank	Did not arrive (DNA)
Blank	Excluded (EX)

**Bold** - Pole position

Italics - Fastest lap

†: Post-event penalty. Car moved to back of class.

=== TCR Driver's Championship ===
Pos.	Drivers	DAY (United States)	SEB (United States)	LGA (United States)	WGL (United States)	MOS (Canada)	LIM (United States)	ELK (United States)	VIR (United States)	IMS (United States)	ATL (United States)	Points
1	(United States) Harry Gottsacker (Canada) Robert Wickens	6	2	2	5	2	2	**3**	2	2	4	3010
2	(United States) Mason Filippi (Canada) Mark Wilkins	3	3	1	11	3	1	11	3	3	1	2950
3	(United States) Chris Miller (South Africa) Mikey Taylor	5	8	4	2	**1**	6	2	**1**	**1**	**12**	2900
4	(United States) Tyler Maxson	4	6	5	3	11	4	7	6	6	2	2630
5	(Argentina) Roy Block (United States) Tim Lewis Jr.	11	1	12	1	5	9	1	10	11	10	2540
6	(United States) Taylor Hagler	8	5	6	9	8	7	8	5	5	8	2410
7	(Puerto Rico) Bryan Ortiz		6	5	3	11	4	7	6	6	2	2350
8	(Puerto Rico) Victor Gonzalez	10	9	7	8	9	8	9	4	7	5	2350
9	(United States) Mike LaMarra	2	4	10	6	4	10	5	12		3	2300
10	(Belgium) Denis Dupont	7	14	8	13	6	11	4	13	4	11	2210
11	(United States) Michael Lewis	8	5	6	9	8	7	8	5	5		2180
12	(United States) Ryan Eversley	**9**	11	**3**	**12**	10	**3**	5	12		3	2170
13	(United States) Preston Brown	13	7	13	7	7	13	10	11	13	9	2070
14	(United States) William Tally	2	4	10	6	4	10	DNS	7		7	2030
15	(United States) Eric Rockwell	7	7	13	7	6	11	4		4		1910
16	(United States) Mat Pombo	**9**	11	**3**	**12**	10	**3**	DNS	7		7	1900
17	(United States) Jacob Deily	4	15	9			14	12	8	10	13†	1640
18	(United States) Cabot Bigham	14	15	9			12	13	9	8	6	1620
19	(Canada) Nick Looijmans	7	14	8	13				13	4	11	1480
20	(United States) Alex Rockwell	13				7	13	10	11	13	9	1410
21	(Canada) Karl Wittmer	10	9	7	8	9	8					1350
22	(United States) Jordan Wisely			11			12	13	9	8	6	1270
23	(United States) Steve Eich (United States) Chad Gilsinger	12	12		10			6		12		1030
24	(United Kingdom) Gavin Ernstone (United States) Jonathan Morley	1	13		4					14		980
25	(United States) Sally McNulty							12	8	10	13†	810
26	(United States) Tyler Gonzalez								4	7	5	780
27	(Canada) James Vance		10	11								410
28	(United States) Luca Mars (United States) Rory van der Steur						5					260
29	(United States) Bryson Morris										8	230
30	(United States) Cristian Perocarpi							9				220
31	(United States) Eddie Gou (United States) Lalo Gou								9			220
32	(United States) Nate Stacy		10									210
33	(Germany) Mario Farnbacher	12										190
34	(United States) Tyler Chambers									12		190
35	(United States) Tom O'Gorman	13										180
36	(United States) Jeronimo Guzman									13		180
37	(United States) Matt Jaskol	14										170
38	(United States) Robert Megennis						14					170

Colour	Result
Gold	Winner
Silver	Second place
Bronze	Third place
Green	Points classification
Blue	Non-points classification
Blue	Non-classified finish (NC)
Purple	Retired, not classified (Ret)
Red	Did not qualify (DNQ)
Red	Did not pre-qualify (DNPQ)
Black	Disqualified (DSQ)
White	Did not start (DNS)
White	Withdrew (WD)
White	Race cancelled (C)
Blank	Did not practice (DNP)
Blank	Did not arrive (DNA)
Blank	Excluded (EX)

**Bold** - Pole position

Italics - Fastest lap

=== GS Bronze Drivers Cup ===
Pos.	Drivers	DAY (United States)	SEB (United States)	LGA (United States)	DET (United States)	WGL (United States)	MOS (Canada)	ELK (United States)	VIR (United States)	IMS (United States)	ATL (United States)	Points
1	(United States) Gary Ferrera (United States) Kris Wilson	16	21	DNS			20		23		12	1690
2	(United States) Ramin Abdolvahabi (United States) Rob Ecklin	17				11		22				1000
3	(United States) Drew Neubauer (United States) Stephen Vajda	20				14				23		950
4	(United States) Jonathan Branam (United States) John Potter	14										350
5	(United States) Tony Ave (Canada) George Staikos						16					350

Colour	Result
Gold	Winner
Silver	Second place
Bronze	Third place
Green	Points classification
Blue	Non-points classification
Blue	Non-classified finish (NC)
Purple	Retired, not classified (Ret)
Red	Did not qualify (DNQ)
Red	Did not pre-qualify (DNPQ)
Black	Disqualified (DSQ)
White	Did not start (DNS)
White	Withdrew (WD)
White	Race cancelled (C)
Blank	Did not practice (DNP)
Blank	Did not arrive (DNA)
Blank	Excluded (EX)

**Bold** - Pole position

Italics - Fastest lap

=== GS Team's Championship ===
Pos.	Drivers	DAY (United States)	SEB (United States)	LGA (United States)	DET (United States)	WGL (United States)	MOS (Canada)	ELK (United States)	VIR (United States)	IMS (United States)	ATL (United States)	Points
1	(United States) #96 Turner Motorsport	18	1	12	9	1	18	4	2	5	11	2430
2	(United States) #71 Rebel Rock Racing	32	3	10	14	13	2	1	1	4	6	2420
3	(United States) #72 Murillo Racing	4	18	1	7	**3**	7	10	8	13	8	2390
4	(United States) #28 RS1	**30**	6	2	2	12	11	8	19	7	3	2180
5	(United States) #47 NOLASPORT	25	5	4	6	19	10	6	4	16	2	2180
6	(United States) #83 BGB Motorsports	2	24	5	8	7	12	23	6	6	20	2000
7	(United States) #13 McCumbee McAleer Racing with Aerosport	22	14	8	11	15	19	3	3	8	23	1880
8	(United States) #46 Team TGM	9	8	17	12	9	6	19	9	24	9	1880
9	(United States) #39 CarBahn with Peregrine Racing	27	12	7	4	8	9	9	17	9	22	1870
10	(United States) #27 Lone Star Racing	15	4	21†	18	16	5	17	18	2	13	1850
11	(United States) #56 Murillo Racing	8	7	18	5	5	21	11	10		10	1840
12	(United States) #19 van der Steur Racing	12	19	**11**	19	6	3	15	15	12	19	1810
13	(United States) #95 Turner Motorsport	26	2	9	**20**	2	24†	**7**	**11**	11	24†	1800
14	(United States) #57 Winward Racing	24	26	3	1	18	23	24†	20	1	5	1770
15	(Canada) #69 Motorsport in Action	21	16	13	13	10	17	21	13	**15**	**1**	1750
16	(United States) #59 KohR Motorsports	23	17	20	16	DNS	13	2	5	10	4	1730
17	(United States) #43 Stephen Cameron Racing	13	9	6	17	17	14	12	16	17	18	1710
18	(United States) #44 Accelerating Performance	10	11	15	10		22	16	7	19	15	1540
19	(United States) #64 Team TGM	19	15	16	22	20†	15	14	21	25	14	1290
20	(United States) #14 TGR Ave Motorsports	30	13	19	21	4		18	12	26	16	1210
21	(United States) #88 Archangel Motorsports	11		14	15	21†	8	20	22	22		1150
22	(United States) #92 Random Vandals Racing		27†					5	24†	3	7	910
23	(United States) #11 Wilsports	16	21	DNS			20		23		12	630
24	(United States) #26 Fast Track Racing	29	20					13	14	18		610
25	(United States) #78 Thaze Competition				3		4					580
26	(Japan) #50 Hattori Motorsports						**1**				17	490
27	(United States) #23 JTR Motorsports Engineering	7	10									450
28	(United States) #09 Automatic Racing AMR	17				11		22				430
29	(United States) #79 NV Autosport	20				14				23		280
30	(United States) #42 PF Racing	1										350
31	(United States) #58 Crucial Motorsports	6	23									330
32	(United States) #41 PF Racing	3										300
33	(United States) #9 Automatic Racing AMR	5										260
34	(United States) #77 Stephen Cameron Racing									21	21	200
35	(United States) #29 TR3 Racing	14										170
36	(United States) #32 GMG Racing									14		170
37	(United States) #4 Ave Motorsports						16					150
38	(United States) #25 Auto Technic Racing	28	22									120
39	(United States) #21 Rearden Racing									20		110
40	(United States) #85 Crucial Motorsports		25									60
41	(United States) #93 CarBahn with Peregrine Racing									27		40

Colour	Result
Gold	Winner
Silver	Second place
Bronze	Third place
Green	Points classification
Blue	Non-points classification
Blue	Non-classified finish (NC)
Purple	Retired, not classified (Ret)
Red	Did not qualify (DNQ)
Red	Did not pre-qualify (DNPQ)
Black	Disqualified (DSQ)
White	Did not start (DNS)
White	Withdrew (WD)
White	Race cancelled (C)
Blank	Did not practice (DNP)
Blank	Did not arrive (DNA)
Blank	Excluded (EX)

**Bold** - Pole position

Italics - Fastest lap

†: Post-event penalty. Car moved to back of class.

=== TCR Team's Championship ===
Pos.	Drivers	DAY (United States)	SEB (United States)	LGA (United States)	WGL (United States)	MOS (Canada)	LIM (United States)	ELK (United States)	VIR (United States)	IMS (United States)	ATL (United States)	Points
1	(United States) #33 Bryan Herta Autosport with Curb-Agajanian	6	2	2	5	2	2	**3**	2	2	4	3010
2	(United States) #98 Bryan Herta Autosport with Curb-Agajanian	3	3	1	11	3	1	11	3	3	1	2950
3	(United States) #17 Unitronic/JDC-Miller MotorSports	5	8	4	2	**1**	6	2	**1**	**1**	**12**	2900
4	(United States) #5 KMW Motorsports with TMR Engineering	11	1	12	1	5	9	1	10	11	10	2540
5	(United States) #1 Bryan Herta Autosport with Curb-Agajanian	8	5	6	9	8	7	8	5	5	8	2410
6	(United States) #91 van der Steur Racing		6	5	3	11	4	7	6	6	2	2350
7	(Puerto Rico) #99 Victor Gonzalez Racing Team	10	9	7	8	9	8	9	4	7	5	2350
8	(United States) #15 Rockwell Autosport Development	7	14	8	13	6	11	4	13	4	11	2210
9	(United States) #73 LA Honda World Racing	2	4	10	6	4	10	DNS	7		3	2090
10	(United States) #10 Rockwell Autosport Development	13	7	13	7	7	13	10	11	13	9	2070
11	(United States) #37 LA Honda World Racing	**9**	11	**3**	**12**	10	**3**	5	12			1870
12	(United States) #74 Deily Motorsports	14	10	11			12	13	9	8	6	1650
13	(United States) #70 Deily Motorsports	4	15	9			14	12	8	10	13†	1640
14	(United States) #89 HART	12	12		10			6		12		1030
15	(United States) #61 Road Shagger Racing	1	13		4					14		980
16	(United States) #90 van der Steur Racing						5					260
17	(United States) #7 LA Honda World Racing										7	240
28	(United States) #55 Gou Racing								9			220

Colour	Result
Gold	Winner
Silver	Second place
Bronze	Third place
Green	Points classification
Blue	Non-points classification
Blue	Non-classified finish (NC)
Purple	Retired, not classified (Ret)
Red	Did not qualify (DNQ)
Red	Did not pre-qualify (DNPQ)
Black	Disqualified (DSQ)
White	Did not start (DNS)
White	Withdrew (WD)
White	Race cancelled (C)
Blank	Did not practice (DNP)
Blank	Did not arrive (DNA)
Blank	Excluded (EX)

**Bold** - Pole position

Italics - Fastest lap

=== GS Manufacturer's Championship ===
Pos.	Drivers	DAY (United States)	SEB (United States)	LGA (United States)	DET (United States)	WGL (United States)	MOS (Canada)	ELK (United States)	VIR (United States)	IMS (United States)	ATL (United States)	Points
1	(Germany) Mercedes-AMG	4	4	1	1	**3**	4	10	8	1	5	3050
2	(Germany) BMW	13	1	6	**9**	1	14	**4**	**2**	3	7	2980
3	(Germany) Porsche	**2**	5	2	2	7	9	6	4	6	2	2920
4	(United States) Chevrolet	32	3	10	14	13	2	1	1	4	6	2870
5	(United States) Ford	1	14	8	11	14	13	2	3	8	4	2790
6	(United Kingdom) Aston Martin	5	8	**11**	10	6	3	14	9	12	9	2640
7	(Japan) Toyota	31	13	19	21	4	**1**	18	12	26	16	2540
8	(United Kingdom) McLaren	6	16	13	13	10	17	21	13	**15**	**1**	2510

=== TCR Manufacturer's Championship ===
Pos.	Drivers	DAY (United States)	SEB (United States)	LGA (United States)	WGL (United States)	MOS (Canada)	LIM (United States)	ELK (United States)	VIR (United States)	IMS (United States)	ATL (United States)	Points
1	(South Korea) Hyundai	3	2	1	3	2	1	**3**	2	2	1	3230
2	(Germany) Audi	1	7	4	2	**1**	6	2	**1**	**1**	**9**	3220
3	(Italy) Alfa Romeo	11	1	12	1	5	9	1	10	11	10	3030
4	(Japan) Honda	**2**	4	**3**	**6**	4	**3**	5	7	12	3	3020
