= 2022 Michelin Pilot Challenge =

Motor racing competition

The 2022 Michelin Pilot Challenge was the twenty-third season of the IMSA SportsCar Challenge and the ninth season organized by the International Motor Sports Association (IMSA). The season began on January 27 at Daytona International Speedway and concluded on October 1 at Road Atlanta. This season also saw the return of former IndyCar driver Robert Wickens after his horrific accident at the 2018 ABC Supply 500 left him as a paraplegic.

== Classes ==
- Grand Sport (GS) (run to GT4 regulations)
- Touring Car (TCR)

== Calendar ==
The provisional 2022 calendar was released on August 6, 2021 at IMSA's annual State of the Sport Address, featuring ten rounds.

Round	Race	Circuit	Location	Date	Duration
1	BMW M Endurance Challenge at Daytona	(United States) Daytona International Speedway	Daytona Beach, Florida	January 27–30	4 Hours
2	Alan Jay Automotive Network 120	(United States) Sebring International Raceway	Sebring, Florida	March 16–19	2 Hours
3	WeatherTech Raceway Laguna Seca 120	(United States) WeatherTech Raceway Laguna Seca	Monterey, California	April 29–May 1	2 Hours
4	Mid-Ohio 120	(United States) Mid-Ohio Sports Car Course	Lexington, Ohio	May 13–15	2 Hours
5	Tioga Downs Casino Resort 120 at The Glen	(United States) Watkins Glen International	Watkins Glen, New York	June 23–26	2 Hours
6	Canadian Tire Motorsport Park 120	(Canada) Canadian Tire Motorsport Park	Bowmanville, Ontario	July 1–3	2 Hours
7	Lime Rock Park 120	(United States) Lime Rock Park	Lakeville, Connecticut	July 15–16	2 Hours
8	Road America 240	(United States) Road America	Elkhart Lake, Wisconsin	August 5–7	4 Hours
9	Virginia Is For Racing Lovers Grand Prix	(United States) Virginia International Raceway	Alton, Virginia	August 26–28	2 Hours
10	Fox Factory 120	(United States) Michelin Raceway Road Atlanta	Braselton, Georgia	September 28–October 1	2 Hours

Calendar Changes

- Canadian Tire Motorsport Park (Mosport) returned to the calendar after being cancelled for 2020 and 2021 due to the COVID-19 pandemic.
- The second round at Watkins Glen International, which served as the replacement for Canadian Tire Motorsport Park in 2021, did not return to the schedule.

== Series news ==
- 2022 marked the introduction of the Bronze Cup, a sub-championship of the GS class in which all-Bronze driver lineups would score points towards their own championship alongside the overall GS classification.

== Entry list ==
=== Grand Sport ===
Team	Car	Engine	No.	Drivers	Class	Rounds
(United States) Automatic Racing AMR	Aston Martin Vantage AMR GT4	Aston Martin 4.0 L Turbo V8	09	(United States) Ramin Abdolvahabi	B	1–5, 8, 10
(United States) Automatic Racing AMR	Aston Martin Vantage AMR GT4	Aston Martin 4.0 L Turbo V8	09	(United States) Rob Ecklin Jr.	B	1–5, 8
(United States) Automatic Racing AMR	Aston Martin Vantage AMR GT4	Aston Martin 4.0 L Turbo V8	09	(United States) Casey Carden	B	10
(United States) Automatic Racing AMR	Aston Martin Vantage AMR GT4	Aston Martin 4.0 L Turbo V8	27	(United States) Jon Branam	B	1–2
(United States) Automatic Racing AMR	Aston Martin Vantage AMR GT4	Aston Martin 4.0 L Turbo V8	27	(United States) Paul Kiebler	B	1–2
(Canada) TGR Infinity Autosport	Toyota GR Supra GT4	BMW B58B30 3.0 L Twin-Turbo I6	3	(United States) Sheena Monk		1–2
(Canada) TGR Infinity Autosport	Toyota GR Supra GT4	BMW B58B30 3.0 L Twin-Turbo I6	3	(Canada) Kyle Marcelli		1–2
(United States) TGR Forbush Performance	Toyota GR Supra GT4	BMW B58B30 3.0 L Twin-Turbo I6	6	(United States) Tom Long		1–5
(United States) TGR Forbush Performance	Toyota GR Supra GT4	BMW B58B30 3.0 L Twin-Turbo I6	6	(United States) Luke Rumburg		1–2
(United States) TGR Forbush Performance	Toyota GR Supra GT4	BMW B58B30 3.0 L Twin-Turbo I6	6	(United States) Mark Kvamme		3–4
(United States) TGR Forbush Performance	Toyota GR Supra GT4	BMW B58B30 3.0 L Twin-Turbo I6	6	(United States) Nick Galante		1
(United States) TGR Forbush Performance	Toyota GR Supra GT4	BMW B58B30 3.0 L Twin-Turbo I6	6	(United States) Brandon Kidd		5
(United States) Volt Racing	Aston Martin Vantage AMR GT4	Aston Martin 4.0 L Turbo V8	7	(United States) Alan Brynjolfsson		All
(United States) Volt Racing	Aston Martin Vantage AMR GT4	Aston Martin 4.0 L Turbo V8	7	(United States) Trent Hindman		All
(United States) McCann Racing	Porsche 718 Cayman GT4 RS Clubsport	Porsche 4.0 L Flat-6	8	(United States) Andrew Davis		All
(United States) McCann Racing	Porsche 718 Cayman GT4 RS Clubsport	Porsche 4.0 L Flat-6	8	(United States) Michael McCann		All
(United States) Team Hardpoint	Porsche 718 Cayman GT4 RS Clubsport	Porsche 4.0 L Flat-6	9	(United States) Derek DeBoer	B	8
(United States) Team Hardpoint	Porsche 718 Cayman GT4 RS Clubsport	Porsche 4.0 L Flat-6	9	(United States) Sean Gibbons	B	8
(United States) Team Hardpoint	Porsche 718 Cayman GT4 RS Clubsport	Porsche 4.0 L Flat-6	9	(United States) Sam Owen	B	8
(United States) Team Hardpoint	Porsche 718 Cayman GT4 RS Clubsport	Porsche 4.0 L Flat-6	22	(United States) Nick Galante		2–10
(United States) Team Hardpoint	Porsche 718 Cayman GT4 RS Clubsport	Porsche 4.0 L Flat-6	22	(United States) Sean McAlister		2–10
(United States) Team Hardpoint	Porsche 718 Cayman GT4 RS Clubsport	Porsche 4.0 L Flat-6	22	(United States) John Capestro-Dubets		8
(United States) Capstone Motorsports	Mercedes-AMG GT4	Mercedes-AMG M178 4.0 L V8	11	(United States) Gary Ferrara	B	All
(United States) Capstone Motorsports	Mercedes-AMG GT4	Mercedes-AMG M178 4.0 L V8	11	(United States) Kris Wilson	B	All
(United States) NTE / MC2 Autosport (Note: Entry branded as Corsa Horizon with mc Squared from Laguna Seca onwards.)	Aston Martin Vantage AMR GT4	Aston Martin 4.0 L Turbo V8	12	(United States) Josh Hurley		1–5
(United States) NTE / MC2 Autosport	Aston Martin Vantage AMR GT4	Aston Martin 4.0 L Turbo V8	12	(United States) Manuel Franco		1–4
(United States) NTE / MC2 Autosport	Aston Martin Vantage AMR GT4	Aston Martin 4.0 L Turbo V8	12	(United States) Thomas Merrill		1
(United States) NTE / MC2 Autosport	Aston Martin Vantage AMR GT4	Aston Martin 4.0 L Turbo V8	12	(United States) Patrick Gallagher		5
(United States) TGR Riley Motorsports	Toyota GR Supra GT4	BMW B58B30 3.0 L Twin-Turbo I6	14	(Dominican Republic) Alfredo Najri		1–5, 7–10
(United States) TGR Riley Motorsports	Toyota GR Supra GT4	BMW B58B30 3.0 L Twin-Turbo I6	14	(Brazil) Thiago Camilo		1, 3, 5, 7–8, 10
(United States) TGR Riley Motorsports	Toyota GR Supra GT4	BMW B58B30 3.0 L Twin-Turbo I6	14	(Argentina) Andy Jakos		2, 4
(United States) TGR Riley Motorsports	Toyota GR Supra GT4	BMW B58B30 3.0 L Twin-Turbo I6	14	(Argentina) Julián Santero		1
(United States) TGR Riley Motorsports	Toyota GR Supra GT4	BMW B58B30 3.0 L Twin-Turbo I6	14	(Argentina) Damian Fineschi		6, 9
(United States) TGR Riley Motorsports	Toyota GR Supra GT4	BMW B58B30 3.0 L Twin-Turbo I6	14	(United States) Aaron Telitz		6
(United States) TGR Riley Motorsports	Toyota GR Supra GT4	BMW B58B30 3.0 L Twin-Turbo I6	14	(Costa Rica) Javier Quiros		8
(United States) TGR Riley Motorsports	Toyota GR Supra GT4	BMW B58B30 3.0 L Twin-Turbo I6	21	(Australia) Scott Andrews		1–5
(United States) TGR Riley Motorsports	Toyota GR Supra GT4	BMW B58B30 3.0 L Twin-Turbo I6	21	(United States) Anton Dias Perera		1–5
(United States) TGR Riley Motorsports	Toyota GR Supra GT4	BMW B58B30 3.0 L Twin-Turbo I6	21	(United States) Colin Braun		1
(United States) Riley Motorsports	Mercedes-AMG GT4	Mercedes-AMG M178 4.0 L V8	21	(Australia) Scott Andrews		8–10
(United States) Riley Motorsports	Mercedes-AMG GT4	Mercedes-AMG M178 4.0 L V8	21	(United States) Anton Dias Perera		8–10
(United States) Riley Motorsports	Mercedes-AMG GT4	Mercedes-AMG M178 4.0 L V8	21	(United States) Colin Braun		8
(United States) Ian Lacy Racing	Ford Mustang GT4	Ford 5.2 L Voodoo V8	24	(United States) Frank Gannett		1
(United States) Ian Lacy Racing	Ford Mustang GT4	Ford 5.2 L Voodoo V8	24	(United States) Drew Staveley		1
(United States) RS1	Porsche 718 Cayman GT4 RS Clubsport	Porsche 4.0 L Flat-6	28	(United Kingdom) Stevan McAleer		1–5, 7
(United States) RS1	Porsche 718 Cayman GT4 RS Clubsport	Porsche 4.0 L Flat-6	28	(France) Alexandre Prémat		2–4
(United States) RS1	Porsche 718 Cayman GT4 RS Clubsport	Porsche 4.0 L Flat-6	28	(United States) Eric Filgueiras		1, 5
(United States) RS1	Porsche 718 Cayman GT4 RS Clubsport	Porsche 4.0 L Flat-6	28	(United States) John Capestro-Dubets		7
(United States) GMG Racing	Porsche 718 Cayman GT4 RS Clubsport	Porsche 4.0 L Flat-6	32	(United States) James Sofronas	B	1, 3
(United States) GMG Racing	Porsche 718 Cayman GT4 RS Clubsport	Porsche 4.0 L Flat-6	32	(United States) Kyle Washington	B	1, 3
(United States) FastMD Racing	Audi R8 LMS GT4 Evo	Audi 5.2 L V10	38	(United States) Max Faulkner		2
(United States) FastMD Racing	Audi R8 LMS GT4 Evo	Audi 5.2 L V10	38	(United States) Farhan Siddiqi		2
(United States) Accelerating Performance	Aston Martin Vantage AMR GT4	Aston Martin 4.0 L Turbo V8	39	(United States) Justin Piscitell		10
(United States) Accelerating Performance	Aston Martin Vantage AMR GT4	Aston Martin 4.0 L Turbo V8	39	(Fédération Internationale de l'Automobile) Moisey Uretsky (Note: Moisey Uretsky is Russian, but they compete as neutral competitors using the Fédération Internationale de l'Automobile flag as Russian national emblems were banned by the association due to the Russian invasion of Ukraine.)		10
(United States) PF Racing	Ford Mustang GT4	Ford 5.2 L Voodoo V8	40	(United States) James Pesek		All
(United States) PF Racing	Ford Mustang GT4	Ford 5.2 L Voodoo V8	40	(United States) Chad McCumbee		1–7
(United States) PF Racing	Ford Mustang GT4	Ford 5.2 L Voodoo V8	40	(United States) Joey Hand		8–10
(United States) PF Racing	Ford Mustang GT4	Ford 5.2 L Voodoo V8	41	(United States) Harrison Burton		1
(United States) PF Racing	Ford Mustang GT4	Ford 5.2 L Voodoo V8	41	(United States) Austin Cindric		1
(United States) PF Racing	Ford Mustang GT4	Ford 5.2 L Voodoo V8	42	(United States) Chase Briscoe		1
(United States) PF Racing	Ford Mustang GT4	Ford 5.2 L Voodoo V8	42	(United States) Hailie Deegan		1
(United States) PF Racing	Ford Mustang GT4	Ford 5.2 L Voodoo V8	877	(Canada) Kyle Marcelli		3–10
(United States) PF Racing	Ford Mustang GT4	Ford 5.2 L Voodoo V8	877	(United States) Sheena Monk		3–10
(United States) Stephen Cameron Racing	BMW M4 GT4	BMW N55 3.0 L Twin-Turbo I6	43	(United States) Greg Liefooghe		All
(United States) Stephen Cameron Racing	BMW M4 GT4	BMW N55 3.0 L Twin-Turbo I6	43	(United States) Sean Quinlan		All
(United States) Team TGM	Porsche 718 Cayman GT4 RS Clubsport	Porsche 4.0 L Flat-6	46	(United States) Hugh Plumb		All
(United States) Team TGM	Porsche 718 Cayman GT4 RS Clubsport	Porsche 4.0 L Flat-6	46	(United States) Matt Plumb		All
(United States) Team TGM	Porsche 718 Cayman GT4 RS Clubsport	Porsche 4.0 L Flat-6	64	(United States) Ted Giovanis		All
(United States) Team TGM	Porsche 718 Cayman GT4 RS Clubsport	Porsche 4.0 L Flat-6	64	(United States) Owen Trinkler		All
(United States) NOLASPORT	Porsche 718 Cayman GT4 RS Clubsport	Porsche 4.0 L Flat-6	47	(United States) Jason Hart		1–3, 5, 7–10
(United States) NOLASPORT	Porsche 718 Cayman GT4 RS Clubsport	Porsche 4.0 L Flat-6	47	(United States) Matt Travis		1–3, 5, 7–10
(United States) FCP Euro by Ricca Autosport	Mercedes-AMG GT4	Mercedes-AMG M178 4.0 L V8	55	(United States) Trevor Andrusko		2, 5, 7–8, 10
(United States) FCP Euro by Ricca Autosport	Mercedes-AMG GT4	Mercedes-AMG M178 4.0 L V8	55	(United States) Mike Skeen		2, 5, 7–8, 10
(United States) Murillo Racing	Mercedes-AMG GT4	Mercedes-AMG M178 4.0 L V8	56	(United States) Eric Foss		All
(United States) Murillo Racing	Mercedes-AMG GT4	Mercedes-AMG M178 4.0 L V8	56	(United States) Jeff Mosing		1–2, 9–10
(United States) Murillo Racing	Mercedes-AMG GT4	Mercedes-AMG M178 4.0 L V8	56	(United States) Kenton Koch		3–5, 7–8
(United States) Murillo Racing	Mercedes-AMG GT4	Mercedes-AMG M178 4.0 L V8	56	(United States) Marc Miller		6
(United States) Murillo Racing	Mercedes-AMG GT4	Mercedes-AMG M178 4.0 L V8	65	(United States) Brent Mosing	B	All
(United States) Murillo Racing	Mercedes-AMG GT4	Mercedes-AMG M178 4.0 L V8	65	(United States) Tim Probert	B	All
(United States) Murillo Racing	Mercedes-AMG GT4	Mercedes-AMG M178 4.0 L V8	72	(United States) Kenny Murillo		All
(United States) Murillo Racing	Mercedes-AMG GT4	Mercedes-AMG M178 4.0 L V8	72	(United States) Christian Szymczak		All
(United States) KohR Motorsports	Ford Mustang GT4	Ford 5.2 L Voodoo V8	59	(United States) Billy Johnson		1–5, 7–10
(United States) KohR Motorsports	Ford Mustang GT4	Ford 5.2 L Voodoo V8	59	(United States) Bob Michaelian		1–5, 7–8
(United States) KohR Motorsports	Ford Mustang GT4	Ford 5.2 L Voodoo V8	59	(United States) Luca Mars		9–10
(United States) KohR Motorsports	Ford Mustang GT4	Ford 5.2 L Voodoo V8	60	(United States) Luca Mars		2–5, 7–8
(United States) KohR Motorsports	Ford Mustang GT4	Ford 5.2 L Voodoo V8	60	(United States) Nate Stacy		2–5, 7–8
(Canada) Kelly-Moss Road and Race	Porsche 718 Cayman GT4 RS Clubsport	Porsche 4.0 L Flat-6	66	(United States) David Brule		5, 8–10
(Canada) Kelly-Moss Road and Race	Porsche 718 Cayman GT4 RS Clubsport	Porsche 4.0 L Flat-6	66	(United States) Alec Udell		5, 8–10
(United States) TGR Smooge Racing	Toyota GR Supra GT4	BMW B58B30 3.0 L Twin-Turbo I6	68	(United States) Kevin Conway		1
(United States) TGR Smooge Racing	Toyota GR Supra GT4	BMW B58B30 3.0 L Twin-Turbo I6	68	(United States) John Geesbreght		1
(United States) TGR Smooge Racing	Toyota GR Supra GT4	BMW B58B30 3.0 L Twin-Turbo I6	68	(United Kingdom) Jack Hawksworth		1
(Hong Kong) Absolute Racing	Porsche 718 Cayman GT4 RS Clubsport	Porsche 4.0 L Flat-6	69	(Germany) Lars Kern		3
(Hong Kong) Absolute Racing	Porsche 718 Cayman GT4 RS Clubsport	Porsche 4.0 L Flat-6	69	(Indonesia) Anderson Tanoto		3
(United States) Rebel Rock Racing	Chevrolet Camaro GT4.R	Chevrolet LT1 6.2 L V8	71	(United Kingdom) Robin Liddell		All
(United States) Rebel Rock Racing	Chevrolet Camaro GT4.R	Chevrolet LT1 6.2 L V8	71	(United States) Frank DePew		2–10
(United States) Rebel Rock Racing	Chevrolet Camaro GT4.R	Chevrolet LT1 6.2 L V8	71	(United States) Michael Cooper		1
(United States) BGB Motorsports	Porsche 718 Cayman GT4 RS Clubsport	Porsche 4.0 L Flat-6	83	(United States) Thomas Collingwood		1–6, 8–10
(United States) BGB Motorsports	Porsche 718 Cayman GT4 RS Clubsport	Porsche 4.0 L Flat-6	83	(United States) Spencer Pumpelly		1–6, 8–10
(United States) BGB Motorsports	Porsche 718 Cayman GT4 RS Clubsport	Porsche 4.0 L Flat-6	83	(United States) John Tecce		1, 8
(United States) Random Vandals Racing	BMW M4 GT4	BMW N55 3.0 L Twin-Turbo I6	92	(United States) Al Carter	B	1
(United States) Random Vandals Racing	BMW M4 GT4	BMW N55 3.0 L Twin-Turbo I6	92	(United States) Paul Sparta	B	1
(United States) CarBahn with Peregrine Racing	Porsche 718 Cayman GT4 RS Clubsport	Porsche 4.0 L Flat-6	93	(United States) Tyler McQuarrie		All
(United States) CarBahn with Peregrine Racing	Porsche 718 Cayman GT4 RS Clubsport	Porsche 4.0 L Flat-6	93	(United States) Sameer Gandhi		2–3, 5
(United States) CarBahn with Peregrine Racing	Porsche 718 Cayman GT4 RS Clubsport	Porsche 4.0 L Flat-6	93	(United States) Mark Siegel		1, 4, 6–9
(United States) CarBahn with Peregrine Racing	Porsche 718 Cayman GT4 RS Clubsport	Porsche 4.0 L Flat-6	93	(United States) Tom Dyer		1, 8, 10
(United States) Turner Motorsport	BMW M4 GT4	BMW N55 3.0 L Twin-Turbo I6	95	(United States) Bill Auberlen		All
(United States) Turner Motorsport	BMW M4 GT4	BMW N55 3.0 L Twin-Turbo I6	95	(United States) Dillon Machavern		All
(United States) Turner Motorsport	BMW M4 GT4	BMW N55 3.0 L Twin-Turbo I6	96	(United States) Vin Barletta		All
(United States) Turner Motorsport	BMW M4 GT4	BMW N55 3.0 L Twin-Turbo I6	96	(United States) Robby Foley		All
(United States) Turner Motorsport	BMW M4 GT4	BMW N55 3.0 L Twin-Turbo I6	96	(United States) Michael Dinan		1
(United States) Black Swan Racing	Porsche 718 Cayman GT4 RS Clubsport	Porsche 4.0 L Flat-6	540	(Netherlands) Jeroen Bleekemolen		1–2
(United States) Black Swan Racing	Porsche 718 Cayman GT4 RS Clubsport	Porsche 4.0 L Flat-6	540	(United States) Tim Pappas		1–2
(United States) Black Swan Racing	Porsche 718 Cayman GT4 RS Clubsport	Porsche 4.0 L Flat-6	540	(Netherlands) Sebastiaan Bleekemolen		1

Icon	Class
B	Bronze Cup

=== Touring Car ===
Team	Car	No.	Drivers	Rounds
(United States) Bryan Herta Autosport with Curb-Agajanian	Hyundai Elantra N TCR	1	(United States) Taylor Hagler	All
(United States) Bryan Herta Autosport with Curb-Agajanian	Hyundai Elantra N TCR	1	(United States) Michael Lewis	All
(United States) Bryan Herta Autosport with Curb-Agajanian	Hyundai Elantra N TCR	2	(United States) AJ Muss	All
(United States) Bryan Herta Autosport with Curb-Agajanian	Hyundai Elantra N TCR	2	(United States) Ryan Norman	All
(United States) Bryan Herta Autosport with Curb-Agajanian	Hyundai Elantra N TCR	33	(Canada) Robert Wickens	All
(United States) Bryan Herta Autosport with Curb-Agajanian	Hyundai Elantra N TCR	33	(Canada) Mark Wilkins	1–3, 5–10
(United States) Bryan Herta Autosport with Curb-Agajanian	Hyundai Elantra N TCR	33	(Colombia) Gabby Chaves	4
(United States) Bryan Herta Autosport with Curb-Agajanian	Hyundai Elantra N TCR 1–2, 5–10; Hyundai Veloster N TCR 3–4	77	(United States) Mason Filippi	All
(United States) Bryan Herta Autosport with Curb-Agajanian	Hyundai Elantra N TCR 1–2, 5–10; Hyundai Veloster N TCR 3–4	77	(United States) Tyler Maxson	All
(United States) Bryan Herta Autosport with Curb-Agajanian	Hyundai Elantra N TCR	98	(United States) Parker Chase	All
(United States) Bryan Herta Autosport with Curb-Agajanian	Hyundai Elantra N TCR	98	(United States) Harry Gottsacker	All
(United States) Michael Johnson Racing with Bryan Herta Autosport	Hyundai Elantra N TCR	54	(United States) Michael Johnson	All
(United States) Michael Johnson Racing with Bryan Herta Autosport	Hyundai Elantra N TCR	54	(South Africa) Stephen Simpson	All
(United States) KMW Motorsports with TMR Engineering	Alfa Romeo Giulietta Veloce TCR	5	(Argentina) Roy Block	All
(United States) KMW Motorsports with TMR Engineering	Alfa Romeo Giulietta Veloce TCR	5	(United States) Tim Lewis Jr.	All
(United States) Belgard & Techniseal Racing	Audi RS3 LMS TCR (2017)	15	(United States) Eric Rockwell	1–4, 6, 8–10
(United States) Belgard & Techniseal Racing	Audi RS3 LMS TCR (2017)	15	(United States) Alex Rockwell	1, 5
(United States) Belgard & Techniseal Racing	Audi RS3 LMS TCR (2017)	15	(United States) Preston Brown	2, 7
(United States) Belgard & Techniseal Racing	Audi RS3 LMS TCR (2017)	15	(Belgium) Denis Dupont	3–10
(United States) Belgard & Techniseal Racing	Audi RS3 LMS TCR (2017)	15	(Canada) Nick Looijmans	8
(United States) Belgard & Techniseal Racing	Audi RS3 LMS TCR (2017)	84	(United States) Preston Brown	8–10
(United States) Belgard & Techniseal Racing	Audi RS3 LMS TCR (2017)	84	(United States) Alex Rockwell	8–10
(United States) Belgard & Techniseal Racing	Audi RS3 LMS TCR (2017)	84	(United States) Kyle Raineri	8
(United States) Unitronic JDC-Miller MotorSports	Audi RS3 LMS TCR (2017)	17	(United States) Chris Miller	1–7
(United States) Unitronic JDC-Miller MotorSports	Audi RS3 LMS TCR (2017)	17	(South Africa) Mikey Taylor	1–7
(United States) CB Motorsports	Hyundai Veloster N TCR	18	(United States) Caleb Bacon	2–3
(United States) CB Motorsports	Hyundai Veloster N TCR	18	(United States) Kyle Raineri	2–3
(United States) Van der Steur Racing	Hyundai Veloster N TCR	19	(United States) Tyler Gonzalez	All
(United States) Van der Steur Racing	Hyundai Veloster N TCR	19	(United States) Rory van der Steur	All
(Canada) TWOth Autosport	Audi RS 3 LMS TCR (2021)	26	(Canada) Travis Hill	5–6
(Canada) TWOth Autosport	Audi RS 3 LMS TCR (2021)	26	(United States) Eddie Killeen	5–6
(Canada) TWOth Autosport	Audi RS 3 LMS TCR (2021)	48	(Canada) Nick Looijmans	5–6
(Canada) TWOth Autosport	Audi RS 3 LMS TCR (2021)	48	(Canada) Ron Tomlinson	5–6
(United States) LA Honda World Racing	Honda Civic Type R TCR (FK8)	37	(Portugal) Tiago Monteiro	4
(United States) LA Honda World Racing	Honda Civic Type R TCR (FK8)	37	(United States) Mat Pombo	4
(United States) LA Honda World Racing	Honda Civic Type R TCR (FK8)	73	(United States) Ryan Eversley	1, 4–5, 10
(United States) LA Honda World Racing	Honda Civic Type R TCR (FK8)	73	(United States) Mike LaMarra	1, 4–5
(United States) LA Honda World Racing	Honda Civic Type R TCR (FK8)	73	(United States) Mat Pombo	10
(Germany) New German Performance	Audi RS3 LMS TCR (2017)	44	(United States) Tristan Herbert	1–2
(Germany) New German Performance	Audi RS3 LMS TCR (2017)	44	(United States) William Tally	1
(Germany) New German Performance	Audi RS3 LMS TCR (2017)	44	(United States) Jay Salinsky	2
(United States) Road Shagger Racing	Audi RS3 LMS TCR (2017)	61	(United Kingdom) Gavin Ernstone	1–8, 10
(United States) Road Shagger Racing	Audi RS3 LMS TCR (2017)	61	(United States) Jonathan Morley	1–8, 10
(United States) Deily Motorsports	Hyundai Veloster N TCR	70	(United States) Jacob Deily	10
(United States) Deily Motorsports	Hyundai Veloster N TCR	70	(United States) Peyton Long	10
(United States) AOA Racing	Audi RS3 LMS TCR (2017)	85	(United States) Gino Manley	1
(United States) AOA Racing	Audi RS3 LMS TCR (2017)	85	(United Kingdom) Andy Wilmot	1
(United States) AOA Racing	Audi RS3 LMS TCR (2017)	85	(United States) Patrick Wilmot	1
Hyundai Racing Canada	Hyundai Elantra N TCR	88	(Canada) Connor Attrell	6
Hyundai Racing Canada	Hyundai Elantra N TCR	88	(Canada) Bob Attrell	6
(United States) HART	Honda Civic Type R TCR (FK8)	89	(United States) Steve Eich	1–2, 4–5, 8
(United States) HART	Honda Civic Type R TCR (FK8)	89	(United States) Chad Gilsinger	1–2, 4–5, 8
(United States) HART	Honda Civic Type R TCR (FK8)	89	(United States) Cameron Lawrence	1
(United States) HART	Honda Civic Type R TCR (FK8)	89	(United States) Ryan Eversley	8
(Puerto Rico) Victor Gonzalez Racing Team - VGRT	Honda Civic Type R TCR (FK8)	99	(Puerto Rico) Victor Gonzalez	All
(Puerto Rico) Victor Gonzalez Racing Team - VGRT	Honda Civic Type R TCR (FK8)	99	(Canada) Karl Wittmer	2–10
(Puerto Rico) Victor Gonzalez Racing Team - VGRT	Honda Civic Type R TCR (FK8)	99	(Puerto Rico) Ruben Iglesias	1

== Race results ==
Bold indicates overall winner.

Round	Circuit	GS Winning Car	TCR Winning Car
Round	Circuit	GS Winning Drivers	TCR Winning Drivers
1	(United States) Daytona	**(United States) #28 RS1**	(United States) #5 KMW Motorsports with TMR Engineering
1	(United States) Daytona	**(United States) Eric Filgueiras** **(United Kingdom) Stevan McAleer**	(Argentina) Roy Block (United States) Tim Lewis Jr.
2	(United States) Sebring	**(United States) #40 PF Racing**	(Puerto Rico) #99 Victor Gonzalez Racing Team - VGRT
2	(United States) Sebring	**(United States) Chad McCumbee** **(United States) James Pesek**	(Puerto Rico) Victor Gonzalez (Canada) Karl Wittmer
3	(United States) Laguna Seca	**(United States) #7 Volt Racing**	(United States) #5 KMW Motorsports with TMR Engineering
3	(United States) Laguna Seca	**(United States) Alan Brynjolfsson** **(United States) Trent Hindman**	(Argentina) Roy Block (United States) Tim Lewis Jr.
4	(United States) Mid-Ohio	**(United States) #56 Murillo Racing**	(United States) #98 Bryan Herta Autosport with Curb-Agajanian
4	(United States) Mid-Ohio	**(United States) Eric Foss** **(United States) Kenton Koch**	(United States) Parker Chase (United States) Harry Gottsacker
5	(United States) Watkins Glen	**(United States) #95 Turner Motorsport**	(United States) #33 Bryan Herta Autosport with Curb-Agajanian
5	(United States) Watkins Glen	**(United States) Bill Auberlen** **(United States) Dillon Machavern**	(Canada) Robert Wickens (Canada) Mark Wilkins
6	(Canada) Mosport	**(United States) #56 Murillo Racing**	(United States) #33 Bryan Herta Autosport with Curb-Agajanian
6	(Canada) Mosport	**(United States) Eric Foss** **(United States) Marc Miller**	(Canada) Robert Wickens (Canada) Mark Wilkins
7	(United States) Lime Rock	**(United States) #71 Rebel Rock Racing**	(United States) #17 Unitronic JDC-Miller MotorSports
7	(United States) Lime Rock	**(United States) Frank DePew** **(United Kingdom) Robin Liddell**	(United States) Chris Miller (South Africa) Mikey Taylor
8	(United States) Road America	**(United States) #56 Murillo Racing**	(United States) #5 KMW Motorsports with TMR Engineering
8	(United States) Road America	**(United States) Eric Foss** **(United States) Kenton Koch**	(Argentina) Roy Block (United States) Tim Lewis Jr.
9	(United States) Virginia	**(United States) #40 PF Racing**	(United States) #1 Bryan Herta Autosport with Curb-Agajanian
9	(United States) Virginia	**(United States) Joey Hand** **(United States) James Pesek**	(United States) Taylor Hagler (United States) Michael Lewis
10	(United States) Road Atlanta	**(United States) #95 Turner Motorsport**	(Puerto Rico) #99 Victor Gonzalez Racing Team - VGRT
10	(United States) Road Atlanta	**(United States) Bill Auberlen** **(United States) Dillon Machavern**	(Puerto Rico) Victor Gonzalez (Canada) Karl Wittmer

== Championship standings ==
=== Points systems ===
Championship points are awarded in each class at the finish of each event. Points are awarded based on finishing positions in the race as shown in the chart below.

Position	1	2	3	4	5	6	7	8	9	10	11	12	13	14	15	16	17	18	19	20	21	22	23	24	25	26	27	28	29	30+
Race	350	320	300	280	260	250	240	230	220	210	200	190	180	170	160	150	140	130	120	110	100	90	80	70	60	50	40	30	20	10

Drivers points

Points are awarded in each class at the finish of each event.

Team points

Team points are calculated in exactly the same way as driver points, using the point distribution chart. Each car entered is considered its own "team" regardless if it is a single entry or part of a two-car team.

Manufacturer points

There are also a number of manufacturer championships which utilize the same season-long point distribution chart. The manufacturer championships recognized by IMSA are as follows:

Grand Sport (GS): Car manufacturer
Touring Car (TCR): Car manufacturer

Each manufacturer receives finishing points for its highest finishing car in each class. The positions of subsequent finishing cars from the same manufacturer are not taken into consideration, and all other manufacturers move up in the order.

Example: Manufacturer A finishes 1st and 2nd at an event, and Manufacturer B finishes 3rd. Manufacturer A receives 35 first-place points while Manufacturer B would earn 32 second-place points.

=== Driver's Championships ===
==== Standings: Grand Sport (GS) ====
Pos.	Drivers	DAY	SEB	LGA	MOH	WGL	MOS	LIM	ELK	VIR	ATL	Points
1	(United States) Alan Brynjolfsson (United States) Trent Hindman	7	2	1	2	6	3	2	4	18	6	2760
2	(United States) Eric Foss	8	4	**7**	**1**	7	1	19	1	12	7	2590
3	(United States) Bill Auberlen (United States) Dillon Machavern	3	9	20	21	1	DNS	5	7	5	**1**	2190
4	(United States) James Pesek	17	1	8	7	22	6	21	15	1	13	2090
5	(United Kingdom) Robin Liddell	20	15	15	9	4	4	1	25	9	8	2070
6	(United States) Kenny Murillo (United States) Christian Szymczak	10	23	6	5	3	**2**	7	23	**11**	18	2070
7	(United States) Vin Barletta (United States) Robby Foley	5	26	4	8	9	8	9	12	4	25	2020
8	(Canada) Kyle Marcelli (United States) Sheena Monk	12	28	24	10	12	9	3	6	2	12	1970
9	(United States) Frank DePew		15	15	9	4	4	1	25	9	8	1960
10	(United States) Greg Liefooghe (United States) Sean Quinlan	26	5	16	11	23	10	15	2	8	10	1870
11	(United States) Hugh Plumb (United States) Matt Plumb	6	6	25	6	13	17	20	8	13	11	1850
12	(United States) Ted Giovanis (United States) Owen Trinkler	2	7	23	20	14	15	18	10	3	20	1830
13	(United States) Andrew Davis (United States) Michael McCann	**25**	11	10	3	16	12	12	20	14	15	1740
14	(Dominican Republic) Alfredo Najri	13	3	3	15	24		10	21	21	4	1700
15	(United States) Gary Ferrera (United States) Kris Wilson	11	8	11	18	15	13	14	11	20	21	1680
16	(United States) Tyler McQuarrie	4	17	27	25	18	11	13	13	19	9	1550
17	(United States) Luca Mars		13	12	4	8		17	**19**	22^{†}	3	1530
18	(United Kingdom) Stevan McAleer	1	**16**	2	16	**2**		**8**				1520
19	(United States) Brent Mosing (United States) Tim Probert	14	22	18	17	20	16	11	17	15	17	1430
20	(United States) Chad McCumbee	17	1	8	7	22	6	21				1400
21	(United States) Nick Galante	18	20	19	23	17	14	16	9	16	22	1360
22	(United States) Thomas Collingwood (United States) Spencer Pumpelly	30	18	9	13	11	7		18	17	24	1320
23	(United States) Billy Johnson	29	12	22	24	10		6	22	22^{†}	3	1310
24	(United States) Kenton Koch			**7**	**1**	7		19	1			1300
25	(United States) Trevor Andrusko (United States) Mike Skeen		14			5		4	5		2	1290
26	(United States) Sean McAlister		20	19	23	17	14	16	9	16	22	1230
27	(Brazil) Thiago Camilo	13		3		24		10	21		4	1140
28	(United States) Nate Stacy		13	12	4	8		17	**19**			1140
29	(Australia) Scott Andrews (United States) Anton Dias Perera	23	19	28	12	27			16	10	5	1080
30	(United States) Mark Siegel	4			25		11	13	13	19		1020
31	(United States) Jason Hart (United States) Matt Travis	19	24	5		DNS		22^{†}	26	7	14	1000
32	(United States) Jeff Mosing	8	4							12	7	940
33	(United States) Bob Michaelian	29	12	22	24	10		6	22			920
34	(United States) David Brule (United States) Alec Udell					19			3	6	19	790
35	(United States) Joey Hand								15	1	13	690
36	(United States) Tom Dyer	4							13		9	680
37	(United States) Eric Filgueiras	1				**2**						670
38	(United States) Ramin Abdolvahabi	28	21	21	22	21			14		23	670
39	(France) Alexandre Prémat		**16**	2	16							620
40	(United States) Rob Ecklin	28	21	21	22	21			14			590
41	(United States) Josh Hurley	31	10	13	19	26						570
42	(United States) Tom Long	18	27	14	14	25						570
43	(United States) Manuel Franco	31	10	13	19							520
44	(Argentina) Andy Jakos		3		15							460
45	(United States) John Capestro-Dubets							**8**	9			450
46	(Argentina) Damian Fineschi						5			21		360
47	(United States) Marc Miller						1					350
48	(United States) Mark Kvamme			14	14							340
49	(United States) Sameer Gandhi		17	27		18						310
50	(United States) James Sofronas (United States) Kyle Washington	15		17								300
51	(United States) Michael Dinan	5										260
52	(United States) Aaron Telitz						5					260
53	(United States) Colin Braun	23							16			230
54	(United States) Harrison Burton (United States) Austin Cindric	9										220
55	(Argentina) Julián Santero	13										180
56	(United States) Luke Rumburg	18	27									170
57	(United States) Kevin Conway (United States) John Geesbreght (United Kingdom) Jack Hawksworth	16										150
58	(United States) Justin Piscitell (United States) Moisey Uretsky										16	150
59	(United States) John Tecce	30							18			140
60	(United States) Michael Cooper	20										110
61	(Netherlands) Jeroen Bleekemolen (United States) Tim Pappas	21	DNS									100
62	(Netherlands) Sebastiaan Bleekemolen	21										100
63	(Costa Rica) Javier Quiros								21			100
64	(United States) Frank Gannett (United States) Drew Staveley	22										90
65	(United States) Casey Carden										23	80
66	(United States) Chase Briscoe (United States) Hailie Deegan	24										70
67	(United States) Derek DeBoer (United States) Sean Gibbons (United States) Sam Owen								24			70
68	(United States) Max Faulkner (United States) Farhan Siddiqi		25									60
69	(United States) Brandon Kidd					25						60
70	(United States) Jon Branam (United States) Paul Kiebler	27	29									60
71	(Germany) Lars Kern (Indonesia) Anderson Tanoto			26								50
72	(United States) Patrick Gallagher					26						50
73	(United States) Thomas Merrill	31										10
74	(United States) Al Carter (United States) Paul Sparta	DNS										0
Pos.	Drivers	DAY	SEB	LGA	MOH	WGL	MOS	LIM	ELK	VIR	ATL	Points

Colour	Result
Gold	Winner
Silver	Second place
Bronze	Third place
Green	Points classification
Blue	Non-points classification
Blue	Non-classified finish (NC)
Purple	Retired, not classified (Ret)
Red	Did not qualify (DNQ)
Red	Did not pre-qualify (DNPQ)
Black	Disqualified (DSQ)
White	Did not start (DNS)
White	Withdrew (WD)
White	Race cancelled (C)
Blank	Did not practice (DNP)
Blank	Did not arrive (DNA)
Blank	Excluded (EX)

**Bold** - Pole position

Italics - Fastest lap

†: Post-event penalty. Car moved to back of class.

==== Standings: Touring Car (TCR) ====
Pos.	Drivers	DAY	SEB	LGA	MOH	WGL	MOS	LIM	ELK	VIR	ATL	Points
1	(United States) Taylor Hagler (United States) Michael Lewis	2	2	5	2	16†	2	4	3	1	3	2920
2	(Argentina) Roy Block (United States) Tim Lewis Jr.	1	14	1	10	2	6	7	**1**	4	12	2710
3	(United States) Michael Johnson (South Africa) Stephen Simpson	6	9	6	7	5	10	2	2	5	2	2650
4	(Puerto Rico) Victor Gonzalez	13	1	12	5	6	4	11	9	3	1	2580
5	(United States) Parker Chase (United States) Harry Gottsacker	12	7	**4**	1	7	3	6	6	8	6	2580
6	(Canada) Robert Wickens	3	13	9	11	1	1	**5**	5	11	13	2500
7	(Canada) Karl Wittmer		1	12	5	6	4	11	9	3	1	2400
8	(United States) Mason Filippi (United States) Tyler Maxson	**9**	**15**	7	8	**14**	**8**	3	7	2	8	2340
9	(United States) Tyler Gonzalez (United States) Rory van der Steur	5	6	3	4	12	14	9	8	**6**	14	2320
10	(Canada) Mark Wilkins	3	13	9		1	1	**5**	5	11	13	2300
11	(United States) AJ Muss (United States) Ryan Norman	16	8	10	9	3	7	12	11	7	11	2180
12	(United Kingdom) Gavin Ernstone (United States) Jonathan Morley	14	4	8	3	4	9	8	13		5	2150
13	(United States) Eric Rockwell	7	10	2	12		5		4	9	9	1940
14	(Belgium) Denis Dupont			2	12	9	5	10	4	9	9	1920
15	(United States) Chris Miller (South Africa) Mikey Taylor	10	3	13	13	11	13	1				1600
16	(United States) Ryan Eversley	11			6	13			10		**4**	1120
17	(United States) Alex Rockwell	7				9			12	10	7	1100
18	(United States) Preston Brown	10						10	12	10	7	1060
19	(United States) Steve Eich (United States) Chad Gilsinger	15	5		14	8			10			1030
20	(United States) Mike LaMarra	11			6	13						630
21	(United States) Kyle Raineri		12	11					12			580
22	(Canada) Nick Looijmans					10	DNS		4			280
23	(United States) Tristan Herbert	4	11									480
24	(United States) Mat Pombo				**15**						**4**	440
25	(United States) Caleb Bacon		12	11								390
26	(Canada) Travis Hill (United States) Eddie Killeen					15	11					360
27	(United States) William Tally	4										280
28	(United States) Gino Manley (United Kingdom) Andy Wilmot (United States) Patrick Wilmot	8										230
29	(Canada) Ron Tomlinson					10	DNS					210
30	(United States) Jacob Deily (United States) Peyton Long										10	210
31	(United States) Jay Salinsky		11									200
32	(Colombia) Gabby Chaves				11							200
33	(Canada) Bob Attrell (Canada) Connor Attrell						12					190
34	(Puerto Rico) Ruben Iglesias	13										180
35	(United States) Cameron Lawrence	15										160
36	(Portugal) Tiago Monteiro				**15**							160
Pos.	Drivers	DAY	SEB	LGA	MOH	WGL	MOS	LIM	ELK	VIR	ATL	Points

†: Post-event penalty. Car moved to back of class.

=== Team's Championships ===
==== Standings: Grand Sport (GS) ====
Pos.	Drivers	DAY	SEB	LGA	MOH	WGL	MOS	LIM	ELK	VIR	ATL	Points
1	(United States) #7 Volt Racing	7	2	1	2	6	3	2	4	18	6	2760
2	(United States) #56 Murillo Racing	8	4	**7**	**1**	7	1	19	1	12	7	2590
3	(United States) #95 Turner Motorsport	3	9	20	21	1	DNS	5	7	5	**1**	2190
4	(United States) #40 PF Racing	17	1	8	7	22	6	21	15	1	13	2090
5	(United States) #71 Rebel Rock Racing	20	15	15	9	4	4	1	25	9	8	2070
6	(United States) #72 Murillo Racing	10	23	6	5	3	**2**	7	23	**11**	18	2070
7	(United States) #96 Turner Motorsport	5	26	4	8	9	8	9	12	4	25	2020
8	(United States) #14 TGR Riley Motorsports	13	3	3	15	24	5	10	21	21	4	1960
9	(United States) #43 Stephen Cameron Racing	26	5	16	11	23	10	15	2	8	10	1870
10	(United States) #46 Team TGM	6	6	25	6	13	17	20	8	13	11	1850
11	(United States) #64 Team TGM	2	7	23	20	14	15	18	10	3	20	1830
12	(United States) #42 PF Racing	24										1820
12	(United States) #877 JG Wentworth Racing by PF Racing			24	10	12	9	3	6	2	12	1820
13	(United States) #8 McCann Racing	**25**	11	10	3	16	12	12	20	14	15	1740
14	(United States) #11 Capstone Motorsports	11	8	11	18	15	13	14	11	20	21	1680
15	(United States) #93 CarBahn with Peregrine Racing	4	17	27	25	18	11	13	13	19	9	1550
16	(United States) #28 RS1	1	**16**	2	16	**2**		**8**				1520
17	(United States) #65 Murillo Racing	14	22	18	17	20	16	11	17	15	17	1430
18	(United States) #83 BGB Motorsports	30	18	9	13	11	7		18	17	24	1320
19	(United States) #59 KohR Motorsports	29	12	22	24	10		6	22	22^{†}	3	1310
20	(United States) #55 FCP Euro by Ricca Autosport		14			5		4	5		2	1290
21	(United States) #22 Hardpoint		20	19	23	17	14	16	9	16	22	1230
22	(United States) #60 KohR Motorsports		13	12	4	8		17	**19**			1140
23	(United States) #21 TGR Riley Motorsports	23	19	28	12	27						1080
23	(United States) #21 Riley Motorsports								16	10	5	1080
24	(United States) #47 NOLASPORT	19	24	5		DNS		22^{†}	26	7	14	1000
25	(Canada) #66 Kelly-Moss Road and Race					19			3	6	19	790
26	(United States) #09 Automatic Racing AMR	28	21	21	22	21			14		23	670
27	(United States) #12 NTE / MC2 Autosport	31	10									570
27	(United States) #12 Corsa Horizon with mc squared			13	19	26						570
28	(United States) #6 TGR Forbush Performance	18	27	14	14	25						570
29	(United States) #32 GMG Racing	15		17								300
30	(United States) #41 PF Racing	9										220
31	(Canada) #3 JG Wentworth Racing by Infinity Autosport	12	28									220
32	(United States) #68 TGR Smooge Racing	16										150
33	(United States) #39 Accelerating Performance										16	150
34	(United States) #540 Black Swan Racing	21	DNS									100
35	(United States) #24 Ian Lacy Racing	22										90
36	(United States) #9 Hardpoint								24			70
37	(United States) #38 FastMD Racing		25									60
38	(United States) #27 Automatic Racing AMR	27	29									60
39	(Indonesia) #69 Absolute Racing			26								50
40	(United States) #92 Random Vandals Racing	DNS										0
Pos.	Drivers	DAY	SEB	LGA	MOH	WGL	MOS	LIM	ELK	VIR	ATL	Points

†: Post-event penalty. Car moved to back of class.

==== Standings: Touring Car (TCR) ====
Pos.	Drivers	DAY	SEB	LGA	MOH	WGL	MOS	LIM	ELK	VIR	ATL	Points
1	(United States) #1 Bryan Herta Autosport with Curb-Agajanian	2	2	5	2	16†	2	4	3	1	3	2920
2	(United States) #5 KMW Motorsports with TMR Engineering	1	14	1	10	2	6	7	**1**	4	12	2710
3	(United States) #54 Michael Johnson Racing with Bryan Herta Autosport	6	9	6	7	5	10	2	2	5	2	2650
4	(Puerto Rico) #99 Victor Gonzalez Racing Team - VGRT	13	1	12	5	6	4	11	9	3	1	2580
5	(United States) #98 Bryan Herta Autosport with Curb-Agajanian	12	7	**4**	1	7	3	6	6	8	6	2580
6	(United States) #33 Bryan Herta Autosport with Curb-Agajanian	3	13	9	11	1	1	**5**	5	11	13	2500
7	(United States) #15 Belgard & Techniseal Racing	7	10	2	12	9	5	10	4	9	9	2370
8	(United States) #77 Bryan Herta Autosport with Curb-Agajanian	**9**	**15**	7	8	**14**	**8**	3	7	2	8	2340
9	(United States) #19 Van der Steur Racing	5	6	3	4	12	14	9	8	**6**	14	2320
10	(United States) #2 Bryan Herta Autosport with Curb-Agajanian	16	8	10	9	3	7	12	11	7	11	2180
11	(United States) #61 Road Shagger Racing	14	4	8	3	4	9	8	13		5	2150
12	(United States) #17 Unitronic JDC-Miller MotorSports	10	3	13	13	11	13	1				1600
13	(United States) #89 HART	15	5		14	8			10			1030
14	(United States) #73 LA Honda World Racing	11			6	13					**4**	910
15	(United States) #84 Belgard & Techniseal Racing								12	10	7	640
16	(Germany) #44 New German Performance	4	11									480
17	(United States) #18 CB Motorsports		12	11								390
18	(Canada) #26 TWOth Autosport					15	11					360
19	(United States) #85 AOA Racing	8										230
20	(Canada) #48 TWOth Autosport					10	DNS					210
21	(United States) #70 Deily Motorsports										10	210
22	#88 Hyundai Racing Canada						12					190
23	(United States) #37 LA Honda World Racing				**15**							160
Pos.	Drivers	DAY	SEB	LGA	MOH	WGL	MOS	LIM	ELK	VIR	ATL	Points

†: Post-event penalty. Car moved to back of class.

=== Bronze Driver's Cup ===
Pos.	Drivers	DAY	SEB	LGA	MOH	WGL	MOS	LIM	ELK	VIR	ATL	Points
1	(United States) Gary Ferrera (United States) Kris Wilson	1	1	1	2	1	1	2	1	2	2	3380
2	(United States) Brent Mosing (United States) Tim Probert	2	3	3	1	2	2	1	3	1	1	3260
3	(United States) Ramin Abdolvahabi	5	2	4	3	3			2		3	2080
4	(United States) Rob Ecklin	5	2	4	3	3			2			1780
5	(United States) James Sofronas (United States) Kyle Washington	3		2								620
6	(United States) Jon Branam (United States) Paul Kiebler	4	4									560
7	(United States) Casey Carden										3	300
8	(United States) Derek DeBoer (United States) Sean Gibbons (United States) Sam Owen								4			280
9	(United States) Al Carter (United States) Paul Sparta	DNS										0
Pos.	Drivers	DAY	SEB	LGA	MOH	WGL	MOS	LIM	ELK	VIR	ATL	Points

=== Manufacturer's Championships ===
==== Standings: Grand Sport (GS) ====
Pos.	Drivers	DAY	SEB	LGA	MOH	WGL	MOS	LIM	ELK	VIR	ATL	Points
1	(Germany) Mercedes-AMG	8	4	**6**	**1**	3	**1**	4	1	**10**	2	3030
2	(United Kingdom) Aston Martin	7	2	1	2	6	3	2	4	18	6	2980
3	(Germany) BMW	3	5	4	8	1	8	5	2	4	**1**	2940
4	(Germany) Porsche	**1**	**6**	2	3	**2**	7	**8**	3	3	9	2900
5	(United States) Ford	9	1	8	4	8	6	3	**6**	1	3	2860
6	(United States) Chevrolet	20	15	15	9	4	4	1	25	9	8	2670
7	(Japan) Toyota	12	3	3	12	24	5	10	21	21	4	2620
8	(Germany) Audi		25									230
Pos.	Drivers	DAY	SEB	LGA	MOH	WGL	MOS	LIM	ELK	VIR	ATL	Points

==== Standings: Touring Car (TCR) ====
Pos.	Drivers	DAY	SEB	LGA	MOH	WGL	MOS	LIM	ELK	VIR	ATL	Points
1	(South Korea) Hyundai	**2**	**2**	**3**	1	**1**	**1**	**2**	2	**1**	2	3300
2	(Italy) Alfa Romeo	1	14	1	10	2	6	7	**1**	4	12	3090
3	(Germany) Audi	4	3	2	3	4	5	1	4	9	5	3070
4	(Japan) Honda	11	1	12	**5**	6	4	11	9	3	**1**	3040
Pos.	Drivers	DAY	SEB	LGA	MOH	WGL	MOS	LIM	ELK	VIR	ATL	Points
