= 2024 IMSA VP Challenge Round at Daytona International Speedway =

Sports car race

Map of the Daytona International Speedway road course

The 2024 IMSA VP Challenge Round at Daytona International Speedway was a sports car racing event held between 19 and 21 January 2024 at the Daytona International Speedway. It was the first race of the 2024 IMSA VP Racing SportsCar Challenge season and was held during the Roar Before the 24 for the IMSA SportsCar Championship.

The event consisted of two practice sessions, one qualifying session, and two 45 minute races. Both races were won by Steven Aghakhani in the LMP3 class and Luca Mars in the GSX class.

== Entry list ==
=== LMP3 ===
Manufacturer	Car	Team	No.	Driver
Ligier	Ligier JS P320	MLT Motorsports	6	(United States) Steven Aghakhani
Ligier	Ligier JS P320	Performance Tech Motorsports	7	(United States) Alex Kirby
Ligier	Ligier JS P320	Performance Tech Motorsports	38	(United States) Scott Locke
Ligier	Ligier JS P320	Escuderia ABRO	23	(Ecuador) Miguel Villagomez
Ligier	Ligier JS P320	Sean Creech Motorsport	33	(United States) Lance Willsey
Ligier	Ligier JS P320	Rick Ware Racing with Ave Motorsports	51	(United States) Cody Ware
Ligier	Ligier JS P320	Ave Motorsports	61	(Canada) George Staikos
Ligier	Ligier JS P320	MISHUMOTORS	70	(Germany) Mirco Schultis
Ligier	Ligier JS P320	Forte Racing	77	(United States) Brian Thienes
Duqueine	Duqueine D-08	Fast MD Racing with Remstar	87	(Canada) Marco Kacic

=== GSX ===
Manufacturer	Car	Team	No.	Driver
Aston Martin	Aston Martin Vantage GT4	Archangel Motorsports	22	(United States) Robbie McWilliams
Aston Martin	Aston Martin Vantage GT4	Ruckus Racing	45	(United States) Scott Blind
Aston Martin	Aston Martin Vantage AMR GT4 Evo	Rebel Rock Racing	72	(United States) Frank DePew
Aston Martin	Aston Martin Vantage GT4	van der Steur Racing	82	(United States) Brady Behrman
BMW	BMW M4 GT4 G82	Team ACP by Random Vandals	9	(United States) Nathan Martin
BMW	BMW M4 GT4 G82	Swish Motorsports	12	(United States) Michael Dayton
BMW	BMW M4 GT4 G82	Stephen Cameron Racing	19	(United States) Sean Quinlan
BMW	BMW M4 GT4 G82	Stephen Cameron Racing	43	(United States) Gregory Liefooghe
BMW	BMW M4 GT4 G82	Auto Technic Racing	25	(United States) Mark Brummond
BMW	BMW M4 GT4 G82	Auto Technic Racing	26	(United States) Christopher Tasca
BMW	BMW M4 GT4 G82	Split Decision Motorsports	88	(United States) Patrick Wilmot
BMW	BMW M4 GT4 G82	Turner Motorsports	96	(United States) Joe Dalton
Ford	Ford Mustang GT4	KOHR MOTORSPORTS	59	(United States) Luca Mars
McLaren	McLaren Artura GT4	Motorsports in Action	21	(Canada) Jesse Lazare
Mercedes-AMG	Mercedes-AMG GT GT4	Thaze Competition	37	(United States) Marc Miller
Mercedes-AMG	Mercedes-AMG GT GT4	Thaze Competition	78	(United States) Jonathan Woolridge
Porsche	Porsche 718 GT4 RS CS	KMW Motorsports with TMR Engineering	5	(United States) Angus Rogers
Porsche	Porsche 718 GT4 RS CS	BGB MOTORSPORTS	17	(United States) Will Wachs
Porsche	Porsche 718 GT4 RS CS	BGB MOTORSPORTS	808	(United States) Jim Jonsin
Porsche	Porsche 718 GT4 RS CS	Baby Bull Racing	44	(United States) Moisey Uretsky
Porsche	Porsche 718 GT4 RS CS	Baby Bull Racing	55	(United States) Michael Cooper
Porsche	Porsche 718 GT4 RS CS	Czabok-Simpson Motorsport	66	(United States) Jackson Lee
Toyota	Toyota GR Supra GT4 EVO	BSI Racing	67	(United States) Eric Thompson
Official Entry List

== Race 1 ==
The grid for race 1 was set by the fastest time in a single qualifying session. Car 9 driven by Nathan Martin and Car 72 driven by Frank DePew withdrew prior to qualifying, and Car 78 driven by Jonathan Woolridge withdrew prior to Race 1.

=== Race 1 Starting Grid ===
Class pole position is indicated in bold

Pos.	Class	No.	Driver	Team	Time
1	**LMP3**	**6**	(United States) **Steven Aghakhani**	**MLT Motorsports**	**1:43.361**
2	LMP3	87	(Canada) Marco Kacic	FastMD Racing with Remstar	1:43.417
3	LMP3	7	(United States) Alex Kirby	Performance Tech Motorsports	1:43.730
4	LMP3	77	(United States) Brian Thienes	Forte Racing	1:43.982
5	LMP3	51	(United States) Cody Ware	Rick Ware Racing with Ave Motorsports	1:44.042
6	LMP3	23	(Ecuador) Miguel Villagomez	Escuderia ABRO	1:44.118
7	LMP3	33	(United States) Lance Willsey	Sean Creech Motorsport	1:44.888
8	LMP3	70	(Germany) Mirco Schultis	MISHUMOTORS	1:45.645
9	LMP3	61	(Canada) George Staikos	Ave Motorsports	1:48.056
10	LMP3	38	(United States) Scott Locke	Performance Tech Motorsports	1:50.305
11	**GSX**	**55**	(United States) **Michael Cooper**	**Baby Bull Racing**	**1:53.814**
12	GSX	37	(United States) Marc Miller	Thaze Competition	1:53.895
13	GSX	43	(United States) Gregory Liefooghe	Stephen Cameron Racing	1:54.238
14	GSX	66	(United States) Jackson Lee	Czabok-Simpson Motorsport	1:54.583
15	GSX	67	(United States) Eric Thompson	BSI Racing	1:54.688
16	GSX	88	(United States) Patrick Wilmot	Split Decision Motorsports	1:54.776
17	GSX	82	(United States) Brady Behrman	van der Steur Racing	1:54.804
18	GSX	45	(United States) Scott Blind	Ruckus Racing	1:55.010
19	GSX	19	(United States) Sean Quinlan	Stephen Cameron Racing	1:55.270
20	GSX	21	(Canada) Jesse Lazare	Motorsports in Action	1:55.313
21	GSX	25	(United States) Mark Brummond	Auto Technic Racing	1:56.224
22	GSX	5	(United States) Angus Rogers	KMW Motorsports with TMR Engineering	1:56.983
23	GSX	17	(United States) Will Wachs	BGB MOTORSPORTS	1:56.992
24	GSX	808	(United States) Jim Jonsin	BGB MOTORSPORTS	1:57.010
25	GSX	12	(United States) Michael Dayton	Swish Motorsports	1:57.227
26	GSX	96	(United States) Joe Dalton	Turner Motorsport	1:57.260
27	GSX	22	(United States) Robbie McWilliams	Archangel Motorsports	1:57.538
28	GSX	26	(United States) Christopher Tasca	Auto Technic Racing	1:58.265
29	GSX	44	(United States) Moisey Uretsky	Baby Bull Racing	No Time Set
30	GSX	59	(United States) Luca Mars	KOHR MOTORSPORTS	Time Disallowed (Note: Car #59 had all times disallowed due to being found underweight in technical inspection.)
Race 1 Official Starting Grid

=== Report ===
On the first lap of the race, Cody Ware spun heading into turn 1, forcing Miguel Villagomez off the track to avoid him. Ware would recover from the spin to later finish 3rd.

With 28 minutes to go, Christopher Tasca suffered a right-rear puncture and had to retire from the race.

With 19 minutes to go, Robbie McWilliams crashed into the tire wall on the outside of the Le Mans Chicane, causing a full course yellow to be thrown on lap 16.

Under full course yellow, Miguel Villagomez suffered a technical issue that caused his car to stop and become stranded coming out of the pit lane. The recovery of his car prolonged the full course yellow.

The race restarted with six minutes remaining with Alex Kirby leading in LMP3 and Gregory Liefooghe leading in GSX.

With two laps left, Steven Aghakhani took the lead into turn two after Alex Kirby went wide exiting turn one. Aghakhani would hold this lead until the end of the race.

On the last lap, Luca Mars drafted off of and passed Gregory Liefooghe in Speedway Turn 4, taking the GSX class win by 0.051 seconds.

=== Race results ===
Class winners are indicated in bold.

Pos.	Class	No.	Driver	Team	Laps	Gap
1	**LMP3**	**6**	**(United States) Steven Aghakhani**	MLT Motorsports	23	-
2	LMP3	7	(United States) Alex Kirby	Performance Tech Motorsports	23	+1.238
3	LMP3	51	(United States) Cody Ware	Rick Ware Racing with Ave Motorsports	23	+5.746
4	LMP3	87	(Canada) Marco Kacic	FastMD Racing with Remstar	23	+6.035
5	LMP3	77	(United States) Brian Thienes	Forte Racing	23	+6.993
6	LMP3	70	(Germany) Mirco Schultis	MISHUMOTORS	23	+10.754
7	LMP3	33	(United States) Lance Willsey	Sean Creech Motorsport	23	+11.248
8	LMP3	61	(Canada) George Staikos	Ave Motorsports	23	+24.432
9	LMP3	38	(United States) Scott Locke	Performance Tech Motorsports	23	+41.900
10	**GSX**	**59**	**(United States) Luca Mars**	**KOHR MOTORSPORTS**	**22**	**1 Lap**
11	GSX	43	(United States) Gregory Liefooghe	Stephen Cameron Racing	22	1 Lap
12	GSX	37	(United States) Marc Miller	Thaze Competition	22	1 Lap
13	GSX	55	(United States) Michael Cooper	Baby Bull Racing	22	1 Lap
14	GSX	88	(United States) Patrick Wilmot	Split Decision Motorsports	22	1 Lap
15	GSX	67	(United States) Eric Thompson	BSI Racing	22	1 Lap
16	GSX	66	(United States) Jackson Lee	Czabok-Simpson Motorsport	22	1 Lap
17	GSX	25	(United States) Mark Brummond	Auto Technic Racing	22	1 Lap
18	GSX	19	(United States) Sean Quinlan	Stephen Cameron Racing	22	1 Lap
19	GSX	12	(United States) Michael Dayton	Swish Motorsports	22	1 Lap
20	GSX	808	(United States) Jim Jonsin	BGB MOTORSPORTS	22	1 Lap
21	GSX	45	(United States) Scott Blind	Ruckus Racing	22	1 Lap
22	GSX	21	(Canada) Jesse Lazare	Motorsports in Action	22	1 Lap
23	GSX	82	(United States) Brady Behrman	van der Steur Racing	22	1 Lap
24	GSX	5	(United States) Angus Rogers	KMW Motorsports with TMR Engineering	22	1 Lap
25	GSX	96	(United States) Joe Dalton	Turner Motorsport	22	1 Lap
26	GSX	17	(United States) Will Wachs	BGB MOTORSPORTS	22	1 Lap
27	GSX	44	(United States) Moisey Uretsky	Baby Bull Racing	22	1 Lap
28	LMP3	23	(Ecuador) Miguel Villagomez	Escuderia ABRO	15	Not Running
29	GSX	22	(United States) Robbie McWilliams	Archangel Motorsports	12	Not Running
30	GSX	26	(United States) Christopher Tasca	Auto Technic Racing	8	Not Running
Race 1 Unofficial Results

== Race 2 ==
The grid for race 2 was set by either the driver's second fastest lap in qualifying, or the driver's fastest lap in race 1. The fastest of the two is used.

=== Race 2 Starting Grid ===
Class pole position is indicated in bold

Pos	Class	No.	Drivers	Team	Time
1	**LMP3**	**6**	**(United States)** **Steven Aghakhani**	**MLT Motorsports**	**1:43.536**
2	LMP3	87	(Canada) Marco Kacic	FastMD Racing with Remstar	1:43.784
3	LMP3	7	**(United States)** Alex Kirby	Performance Tech Motorsports	1:43.914
4	LMP3	77	**(United States)** Brian Thienes	Forte Racing	1:44.018
5	LMP3	51	**(United States)** Cody Ware	Rick Ware Racing with Ave Motorsports	1:44.077
6	LMP3	23	(Ecuador) Miguel Villagomez	Escuderia ABRO	1:44.221
7	LMP3	33	**(United States)** Lance Willsey	Sean Creech Motorsport	1:45.218
8	LMP3	70	(Germany) Mirco Schultis	MISHUMOTORS	1:46.259
9	LMP3	61	(Canada) George Staikos	Ave Motorsports	1:48.020
10	LMP3	38	**(United States)** Scott Locke	Performance Tech Motorsports	1:50.318
11	**GSX**	**59**	**(United States) Luca Mars**	**KOHR MOTORSPORTS**	**1:53.740**
12	GSX	55	**(United States)** Michael Cooper	Baby Bull Racing	1:53.908
13	GSX	37	**(United States)** Marc Miller	Thaze Competition	1:54.073
14	GSX	43	**(United States)** Gregory Liefooghe	Stephen Cameron Racing	1:54.339
15	GSX	21	**(Canada)** Jesse Lazare	Motorsports in Action	1:54.679
16	GSX	66	**(United States)** Jackson Lee	Czabok-Simpson Motorsport	1:54.828
17	GSX	88	**(United States)** Patrick Wilmot	Split Decision Motorsports	1:54.838
18	GSX	45	**(United States)** Scott Blind	Ruckus Racing	1:55.509
19	GSX	19	**(United States)** Sean Quinlan	Stephen Cameron Racing	1:55.524
20	GSX	67	**(United States)** Eric Thompson	BSI Racing	1:55.551
21	GSX	82	**(United States)** Brady Behrman	van der Steur Racing	1:55.950
22	GSX	25	**(United States)** Mark Brummond	Auto Technic Racing	1:55.950
23	GSX	12	**(United States)** Michael Dayton	Swish Motorsports	1:56.178
24	GSX	808	**(United States)** Jim Jonsin	BGB MOTORSPORTS	1:56.756
25	GSX	44	**(United States)** Moisey Uretsky	Baby Bull Racing	1:56.874
26	GSX	26	**(United States)** Christopher Tasca	Auto Technic Racing	1:56.916
27	GSX	5	**(United States)** Angus Rogers	KMW Motorsports with TMR Engineering	1:56.932
28	GSX	96	**(United States)** Joe Dalton	Turner Motorsport	1:57.103
29	GSX	17	**(United States)** Will Wachs	BGB MOTORSPORTS	1:57.161
30	GSX	22	**(United States)** Robbie McWilliams	Archangel Motorsports	1:57.464
Race 2 Official Starting Grid

=== Report ===
On the first lap of the race, Cody Ware went down the inside of several cars at the west horseshoe and made contact with the 77 car of Brian Thienes, causing him to spin. Ware would receive a 10 second time penalty for incident responsibility and would go on to finish third before the penalty, and drop to eighth after it. Thienes would recover to finish fourth.

An incident in the GSX class occurred when Mark Brummond and Sean Quinlan made contact at the International Horseshoe, causing Brummond to go off the track and Quinlan to spin.

The only full course yellow of the race occurred on lap 21, after Alex Kirby spun heading into the Le Mans chicane, stranding his car in the grass.

The race restarted with one lap remaining with Aghakhani and Mars leading their respective classes, both of them holding onto their leads to win.

=== Race results ===
Class winners are indicated in bold.

Pos	Nr.	Class	Driver	Team	Laps	Gap
1	**6**	**LMP3**	**(United States) Steven Aghakhani**	**MLT Motorsports**	**24**	-
2	87	LMP3	(Canada) Marco Kacic	FastMD Racing with Remstar	24	+4.036
3	23	LMP3	(Ecuador) Miguel Villagomez	Escuderia ABRO	24	+4.056
4	77	LMP3	(United States) Brian Thienes	Forte Racing	24	+4.43
5	70	LMP3	(Germany) Mirco Schultis	MISHUMOTORSPORTS	24	+4.436
6	33	LMP3	(United States) Lance Willsey	Sean Creech Motorsport	24	+4.874
7	61	LMP3	(Canada) George Staikos	Ave Motorsports	24	+7.818
8	51	LMP3	(United States) Cody Ware	Rick Ware Racing with Ave Motorsports	24	+10.700 (Note: Car #51 received a 10 second time penalty after the race for incident responsibility)
9	38	LMP3	(United States) Scott Locke	Performance Tech Motorsports	23	1 Lap
10	**59**	**GSX**	**(United States) Luca Mars**	**KOHR MOTORSPORTS**	**23**	**1 Lap**
11	55	GSX	(United States) Michael Cooper	Baby Bull Racing	23	1 Lap
12	43	GSX	(United States) Gregory Liefooghe	Stephen Cameron Racing	23	1 Lap
13	21	GSX	(Canada) Jesse Lazare	Motorsports in Action	23	1 Lap
14	88	GSX	(United States) Patrick Wilmot	Split Decision Motorsports	23	1 Lap
15	66	GSX	(United States) Jackson Lee	Czabok-Simpson Motorsport	23	1 Lap
16	67	GSX	(United States) Eric Thompson	BSI Racing	23	1 Lap
17	45	GSX	(United States) Scott Blind	Ruckus Racing	23	1 Lap
18	12	GSX	(United States) Michael Dayton	Swish Motorsports	23	1 Lap
19	82	GSX	(United States) Brady Behrman	van der Steur Racing	23	1 Lap
20	44	GSX	(United States) Moisey Uretsky	Baby Bull Racing	23	1 Lap
21	19	GSX	(United States) Sean Quinlan	Stephen Cameron Racing	23	1 Lap
22	5	GSX	(United States) Angus Rogers	KMW Motorsports with TMR Engineering	23	1 Lap
23	808	GSX	(United States) Jim Jonsin	BGB MOTORSPORTS	23	1 Lap
24	96	GSX	(United States) Joe Dalton	Turner Motorsport	23	1 Lap
25	26	GSX	(United States) Christopher Tasca	Auto Technic Racing	23	1 Lap
26	17	GSX	(United States) Will Wachs	BGB MOTORSPORTS	23	1 Lap
27	7	LMP3	(United States) Alex Kirby	Performance Tech Motorsports	19	Not Running
28	25	GSX	(United States) Mark Brummond	Auto Technic Racing	17	Not Running
29	37	GSX	(United States) Marc Miller	Thaze Competition	14	Not Running
30	22	GSX	(United States) Robbie McWilliams	Archangel Motorsports	8	16 Laps
Race 2 Unofficial Results

IMSA VP Racing SportsCar Challenge
Previous race: None	2024 season	Next race: 2024 IMSA VP Challenge Round at St. Petersburg
