= 2026 OnlyBulls Green Flag 150 =

NASCAR Craftsman Truck Series race at the St. Petersburg street circuit

2026 OnlyBulls Green Flag 150 at St. Petersburg
Race details
- Race 3 of 25 in the 2026 NASCAR Craftsman Truck Series
- Date: February 28, 2026
- Location: St. Petersburg street circuit in St. Petersburg, Florida
- Course: Permanent racing facility
- Course length: 1.800 miles (2.897 km)
- Distance: 80 laps, 144 mi (231.746 km)
- Average speed: 58.756 miles per hour (94.559 km/h)

Pole position
Driver	Connor Mosack	Spire Motorsports
- Grid positions set by competition-based formula

Most laps led
Driver	Layne Riggs	Front Row Motorsports
- Laps: 41

Fastest lap
Driver	Layne Riggs	Front Row Motorsports
- Time: 1:18.149

Winner
No. 34	Layne Riggs	Front Row Motorsports

Television in the United States
- Network: FOX
- Announcers: Jamie Little, Townsend Bell, and Michael Waltrip

Radio in the United States
- Radio: NRN
- Booth announcers: Mike Bagley and Todd Gordon
- Turn announcers: Alex Hayden (Turns 1–2) and Michael Young (Turns 10–12)

The 2026 OnlyBulls Green Flag 150 at St. Petersburg was a NASCAR Craftsman Truck Series race held on Saturday, February 28, 2026, at the St. Petersburg street circuit in St. Petersburg, Florida. Contested over 80 laps on the 1.80-mile-long (2.897 km) asphalt street circuit, it was the third race of the 2026 NASCAR Craftsman Truck Series season, and the inaugural running of the event.

In an action-packed race, Layne Riggs, driving for Front Row Motorsports, dominated the later portions of the event by winning the second stage and leading a race-high 41 laps after starting from the rear of the field. He eventually held off a charging Ben Rhodes and Ty Majeski in the final few laps on fuel mileage to earn his sixth career NASCAR Craftsman Truck Series win, and his first of the season. Majeski finished second, while Rhodes finished third. Chandler Smith and Kaden Honeycutt rounded out the top five, while Landen Lewis, Andrés Pérez de Lara, Daniel Hemric, Colin Braun, and James Hinchcliffe rounded out the top ten.

== Report ==
=== Background ===
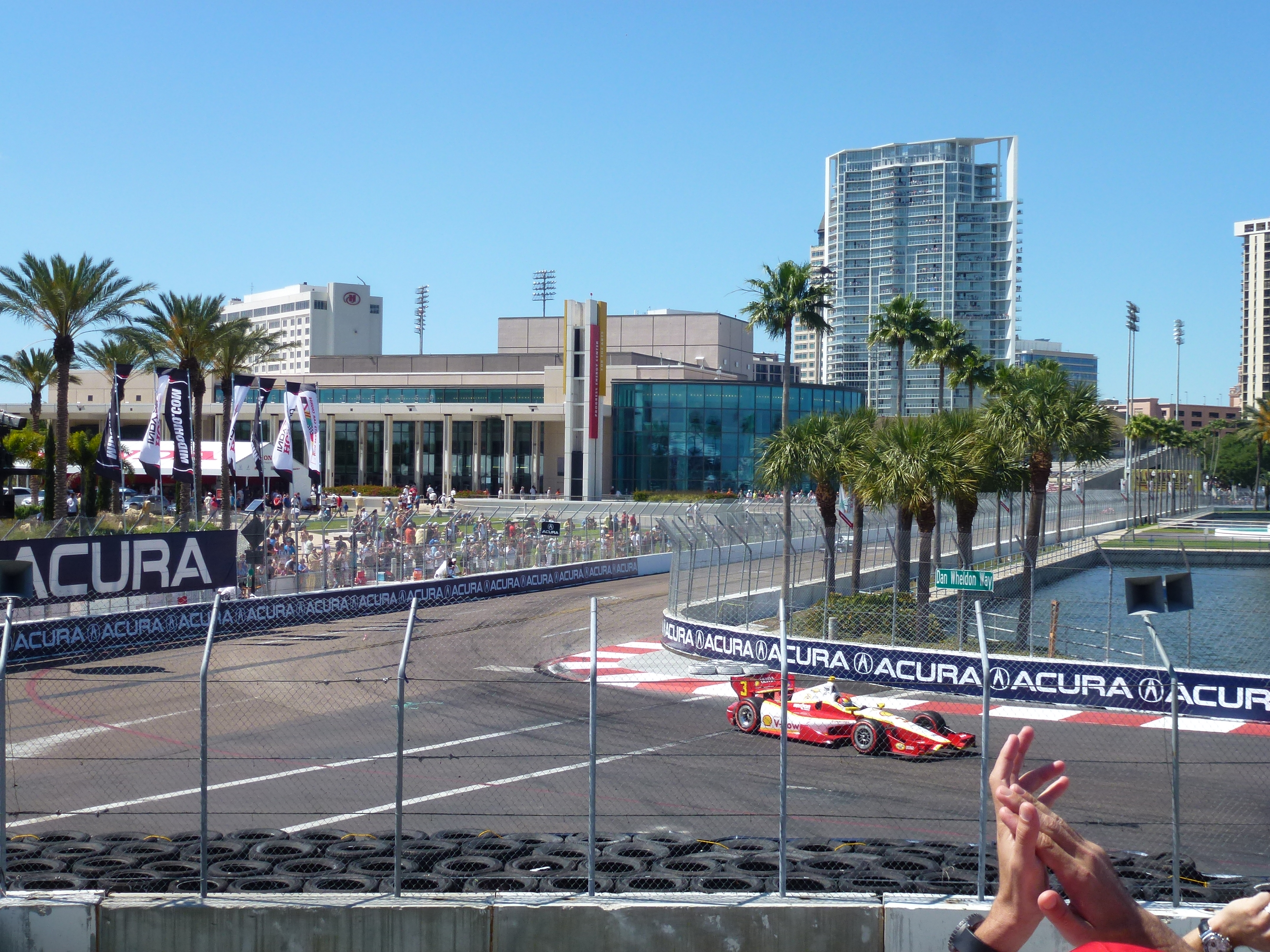
The St. Petersburg street circuit, the track where the race will be held.

The St. Petersburg street circuit is a 1.800-mile long street circuit in St. Petersburg, Florida. The track is notable for hosting the Grand Prix of St. Petersburg, the IndyCar Series season-opening race annually. On August 20, 2025, St. Petersburg was announced as a race on the 2026 schedule, as a doubleheader with the IndyCar Series.

This race will be historic, as this will be the first time the Craftsman Truck Series will race on a street course. Many IndyCar regulars, such as three-time Indianapolis 500 winner Dario Franchitti made his return to the series since 2007, as well as James Hinchcliffe, who made his debut race in the Truck Series.

OnlyBulls was announced as the title sponsor for the race on February 18.

==== Entry list ====
- (R) denotes rookie driver.

#	Driver	Team	Make
1	Dario Franchitti	Tricon Garage	Toyota
2	Carter Fartuch	Team Reaume	Ford
4	Ben Maier	Niece Motorsports	Chevrolet
5	Adam Andretti	Tricon Garage	Toyota
7	Connor Mosack	Spire Motorsports	Chevrolet
9	Grant Enfinger	CR7 Motorsports	Chevrolet
10	Daniel Dye	Kaulig Racing	Ram
11	Kaden Honeycutt	Tricon Garage	Toyota
12	Brenden Queen (R)	Kaulig Racing	Ram
13	Cole Butcher (R)	ThorSport Racing	Ford
14	Mini Tyrrell (R)	Kaulig Racing	Ram
15	Tanner Gray	Tricon Garage	Toyota
16	Justin Haley	Kaulig Racing	Ram
17	Gio Ruggiero	Tricon Garage	Toyota
18	Tyler Ankrum	McAnally–Hilgemann Racing	Chevrolet
19	Daniel Hemric	McAnally–Hilgemann Racing	Chevrolet
22	Jackson Lee	Team Reaume	Ford
25	Colin Braun	Kaulig Racing	Ram
26	Dawson Sutton	Rackley W.A.R.	Chevrolet
33	Frankie Muniz	Team Reaume	Ford
34	Layne Riggs	Front Row Motorsports	Ford
38	Chandler Smith	Front Row Motorsports	Ford
42	Tyler Reif	Niece Motorsports	Chevrolet
44	Andrés Pérez de Lara	Niece Motorsports	Chevrolet
45	Landen Lewis	Niece Motorsports	Chevrolet
52	Stewart Friesen	Halmar Friesen Racing	Toyota
56	Timmy Hill	Hill Motorsports	Toyota
62	Wesley Slimp	Halmar Friesen Racing	Toyota
69	Derek White	MBM Motorsports	Ford
76	Nathan Nicholson	Freedom Racing Enterprises	Chevrolet
77	James Hinchcliffe	Spire Motorsports	Chevrolet
81	Kris Wright	McAnally–Hilgemann Racing	Chevrolet
88	Ty Majeski	ThorSport Racing	Ford
91	Christian Eckes	McAnally–Hilgemann Racing	Chevrolet
98	Jake Garcia	ThorSport Racing	Ford
99	Ben Rhodes	ThorSport Racing	Ford
Official entry list

== Practice ==
The first and only practice session was held on Friday, February 27, at 4:00 PM EST. Originally scheduled for 50 minutes, the session was cut short due to inclement weather.

Kaden Honeycutt, driving for Tricon Garage, set the fastest time in the session, with a lap of 1:18.922 seconds, and a speed of 82.106 miles per hour (132.137 km/h).

=== Practice results ===
Pos.	#	Driver	Team	Make	Time	Speed
1	11	Kaden Honeycutt	Tricon Garage	Toyota	1:18.922	82.106
2	4	Ben Maier	Niece Motorsports	Chevrolet	1:19.740	81.264
3	99	Ben Rhodes	ThorSport Racing	Ford	1:19.772	81.232
Full practice results

== Starting lineup ==
Qualifying was originally scheduled to be held on Friday, February 27, at 5:05 PM EST, but was cancelled due to inclement weather. Connor Mosack, driving for Spire Motorsports, was awarded the pole position as a result of NASCAR's pandemic formula with a score of 1.300.

No drivers failed to qualify.

=== Starting lineup ===
Pos.	#	Driver	Team	Make
1	7	Connor Mosack	Spire Motorsports	Chevrolet
2	17	Gio Ruggiero	Tricon Garage	Toyota
3	77	James Hinchcliffe	Spire Motorsports	Chevrolet
4	99	Ben Rhodes	ThorSport Racing	Ford
5	38	Chandler Smith	Front Row Motorsports	Ford
6	1	Dario Franchitti	Tricon Garage	Toyota
7	62	Wesley Slimp	Halmar Friesen Racing	Toyota
8	45	Landen Lewis	Niece Motorsports	Chevrolet
9	98	Jake Garcia	ThorSport Racing	Ford
10	5	Adam Andretti	Tricon Garage	Toyota
11	16	Justin Haley	Kaulig Racing	Ram
12	10	Daniel Dye	Kaulig Racing	Ram
13	18	Tyler Ankrum	McAnally–Hilgemann Racing	Chevrolet
14	44	Andrés Pérez de Lara	Niece Motorsports	Chevrolet
15	12	Brenden Queen (R)	Kaulig Racing	Ram
16	25	Colin Braun	Kaulig Racing	Ram
17	52	Stewart Friesen	Halmar Friesen Racing	Toyota
18	42	Tyler Reif	Niece Motorsports	Chevrolet
19	11	Kaden Honeycutt	Tricon Garage	Toyota
20	81	Kris Wright	McAnally–Hilgemann Racing	Chevrolet
21	14	Mini Tyrrell (R)	Kaulig Racing	Ram
22	88	Ty Majeski	ThorSport Racing	Ford
23	33	Frankie Muniz	Team Reaume	Ford
24	22	Jackson Lee	Team Reaume	Ford
25	9	Grant Enfinger	CR7 Motorsports	Chevrolet
26	2	Carter Fartuch	Team Reaume	Ford
27	76	Nathan Nicholson	Freedom Racing Enterprises	Chevrolet
28	34	Layne Riggs	Front Row Motorsports	Ford
29	15	Tanner Gray	Tricon Garage	Toyota
30	13	Cole Butcher (R)	ThorSport Racing	Ford
31	91	Christian Eckes	McAnally–Hilgemann Racing	Chevrolet
Qualified by owner's points
32	69	Derek White	MBM Motorsports	Ford
33	26	Dawson Sutton	Rackley W.A.R.	Chevrolet
34	19	Daniel Hemric	McAnally–Hilgemann Racing	Chevrolet
35	4	Ben Maier	Niece Motorsports	Chevrolet
36	56	Timmy Hill	Hill Motorsports	Toyota
Official starting lineup

== Race ==
=== Race results ===
==== Stage results ====
Stage One Laps: 20

Pos.	#	Driver	Team	Make	Pts
1	99	Ben Rhodes	ThorSport Racing	Ford	10
2	7	Connor Mosack	Spire Motorsports	Chevrolet	9
3	45	Landen Lewis	Niece Motorsports	Chevrolet	8
4	38	Chandler Smith	Front Row Motorsports	Ford	7
5	17	Gio Ruggiero	Tricon Garage	Toyota	6
6	1	Dario Franchitti	Tricon Garage	Toyota	5
7	34	Layne Riggs	Front Row Motorsports	Ford	4
8	18	Tyler Ankrum	McAnally-Hilgemann Racing	Chevrolet	3
9	11	Kaden Honeycutt	Tricon Garage	Toyota	2
10	44	Andrés Pérez de Lara	Niece Motorsports	Chevrolet	1

Stage Two Laps: 20

Pos.	#	Driver	Team	Make	Pts
1	34	Layne Riggs	Front Row Motorsports	Ford	10
2	38	Chandler Smith	Front Row Motorsports	Ford	9
3	45	Landen Lewis	Niece Motorsports	Chevrolet	8
4	88	Ty Majeski	ThorSport Racing	Ford	7
5	99	Ben Rhodes	ThorSport Racing	Ford	6
6	17	Gio Ruggiero	Tricon Garage	Toyota	5
7	18	Tyler Ankrum	McAnally-Hilgemann Racing	Chevrolet	4
8	1	Dario Franchitti	Tricon Garage	Toyota	3
9	9	Grant Enfinger	CR7 Motorsports	Chevrolet	2
10	44	Andrés Pérez de Lara	Niece Motorsports	Chevrolet	1

=== Final Stage results ===
Stage Three Laps: 40

Fin	St	#	Driver	Team	Make	Laps	Led	Status	Pts
1	28	34	Layne Riggs	Front Row Motorsports	Ford	80	41	Running	70
2	22	88	Ty Majeski	ThorSport Racing	Ford	80	2	Running	42
3	4	99	Ben Rhodes	ThorSport Racing	Ford	80	23	Running	50
4	5	38	Chandler Smith	Front Row Motorsports	Ford	80	7	Running	49
5	19	11	Kaden Honeycutt	Tricon Garage	Toyota	80	0	Running	34
6	8	45	Landen Lewis	Niece Motorsports	Chevrolet	80	0	Running	47
7	14	44	Andrés Pérez de Lara	Niece Motorsports	Chevrolet	80	0	Running	32
8	34	19	Daniel Hemric	McAnally–Hilgemann Racing	Chevrolet	80	0	Running	29
9	16	25	Colin Braun	Kaulig Racing	Ram	80	0	Running	28
10	3	77	James Hinchcliffe	Spire Motorsports	Chevrolet	80	0	Running	27
11	35	4	Ben Maier	Niece Motorsports	Chevrolet	80	0	Running	26
12	11	16	Justin Haley	Kaulig Racing	Ram	80	0	Running	25
13	1	7	Connor Mosack	Spire Motorsports	Chevrolet	80	7	Running	33
14	30	13	Cole Butcher (R)	ThorSport Racing	Ford	80	0	Running	23
15	31	91	Christian Eckes	McAnally–Hilgemann Racing	Chevrolet	80	0	Running	22
16	18	42	Tyler Reif	Niece Motorsports	Chevrolet	80	0	Running	21
17	12	10	Daniel Dye	Kaulig Racing	Ram	80	0	Running	20
18	9	98	Jake Garcia	ThorSport Racing	Ford	80	0	Running	19
19	20	81	Kris Wright	McAnally–Hilgemann Racing	Chevrolet	80	0	Running	18
20	29	15	Tanner Gray	Tricon Garage	Toyota	80	0	Running	17
21	26	2	Carter Fartuch	Team Reaume	Ford	80	0	Running	16
22	25	9	Grant Enfinger	CR7 Motorsports	Chevrolet	80	0	Running	17
23	10	5	Adam Andretti	Tricon Garage	Toyota	80	0	Running	14
24	15	12	Brenden Queen (R)	Kaulig Racing	Ram	80	0	Running	13
25	2	17	Gio Ruggiero	Tricon Garage	Toyota	79	0	Running	23
26	17	52	Stewart Friesen	Halmar Friesen Racing	Toyota	79	0	Running	11
27	6	1	Dario Franchitti	Tricon Garage	Toyota	79	0	Running	18
28	21	14	Mini Tyrrell (R)	Kaulig Racing	Ram	77	0	Running	9
29	24	22	Jackson Lee	Team Reaume	Ford	75	0	Running	8
30	23	33	Frankie Muniz	Team Reaume	Ford	74	0	Running	7
31	13	18	Tyler Ankrum	McAnally–Hilgemann Racing	Chevrolet	70	0	Running	13
32	36	56	Timmy Hill	Hill Motorsports	Toyota	63	0	Running	5
33	33	26	Dawson Sutton	Rackley W.A.R.	Chevrolet	62	0	Accident	4
34	27	76	Nathan Nicholson	Freedom Racing Enterprises	Chevrolet	55	0	Accident	3
35	32	69	Derek White	MBM Motorsports	Ford	52	0	Fuel Pump	2
36	7	62	Wesley Slimp	Halmar Friesen Racing	Toyota	15	0	Power	1
Official race results

=== Race statistics ===
- Lead changes: 9 among 5 different drivers
- Cautions/Laps: 6 for 17 laps
- Red flags: 0
- Time of race: 2 hours, 27 minutes and 3 seconds
- Average speed: 58.756 miles per hour (94.559 km/h)

== Standings after the race ==
Drivers' Championship standings

	Pos	Driver	Points
	1	Chandler Smith	152
1	2	Ben Rhodes	118 (–34)
1	3	Ty Majeski	102 (–50)
2	4	Gio Ruggiero	98 (–54)
18	5	Layne Riggs	96 (–56)
1	6	Kaden Honeycutt	87 (–65)
1	7	Andrés Pérez de Lara	85 (–67)
3	8	Stewart Friesen	70 (–82)
1	9	Christian Eckes	69 (–83)
3	10	Justin Haley	67 (–85)
Official driver's standings

Manufacturers' Championship standings

	Pos	Manufacturer	Points
1	1	Ford	143
1	2	Chevrolet	120 (–23)
	3	Toyota	101 (–42)
	4	Ram	85 (–58)

- Note: Only the first 10 positions are included for the driver standings.

Previous race: 2026 Fr8 208	NASCAR Craftsman Truck Series; 2026 season	Next race: 2026 Buckle Up South Carolina 200
