= NASCAR Truck Series at the St. Petersburg Street Circuit =

NASCAR Craftsman Truck Series race at the St. Petersburg Street Circuit

OnlyBulls Green Flag 150 at St. Petersburg

NASCAR Truck Series
- Venue: St. Petersburg Street Circuit
- Location: St. Petersburg, Florida, United States
- First race: 2026
- Distance: 126 mi (202.777 km)
- Laps: 70; Stages 1/2: 20; Stage 3: 30
- Most wins (driver): Layne Riggs (1)
- Most wins (team): Front Row Motorsports (1)
- Most wins (manufacturer): Ford (1)

Circuit information
- Surface: Asphalt
- Length: 1.800 mi (2.897 km)
- Turns: 14

The OnlyBulls Green Flag 150 at St. Petersburg is a NASCAR Truck Series held on the St. Petersburg Street Circuit, a street circuit used for the Grand Prix of St. Petersburg, starting in 2026. The race was featured along with the IndyCar Series. The race was held on the same day as the Focused Health 250 in the NASCAR O'Reilly Auto Parts Series.

Layne Riggs would take the inaugural event.

== Background ==
On August 20, 2025, it was announced that St. Petersburg would be featured on the 2026 schedule. It will be the first Truck Series race to be held on a street course, and the second street course that the Truck Series races at, with the other being the Coronado Street Course in July of that same year. On January 16, 2026, it was announced that the race would be 80 laps.

On February 18, 2026, it was announced that OnlyBulls would sponsor the race, making it the OnlyBulls Green Flag 150 at St. Petersburg.

On July 23, 2026, it was announced that the race will return alongside IndyCar for their opener.

== Past winners ==
Year	Date	No.	Driver	Team	Manufacturer	Race Distance		Race Time	Average Speed (mph)	Report	Ref
Year	Date	No.	Driver	Team	Manufacturer	Laps	Miles (km)	Race Time	Average Speed (mph)	Report	Ref
2026	February 28	34	Layne Riggs	Front Row Motorsports	Ford	80	144 (231.746)	2:27:03	58.756	Report	
2027	March 6									Report	

Previous race: Fr8 208	NASCAR Craftsman Truck Series; OnlyBulls Green Flag 150	Next race: Buckle Up South Carolina 200
