= 2026 Bully Hill Vineyards 176 at The Glen =

NASCAR Craftsman Truck Series race at Watkins Glen International

Race details
- Race 8 of 25 in the 2026 NASCAR Craftsman Truck Series
- Date: May 8, 2026
- Location: Watkins Glen International in Watkins Glen, New York
- Course: Permanent racing facility
- Course length: 2.454 miles (3.949 km)
- Distance: 74 laps, 181.3 mi (291.774 km)
- Scheduled distance: 72 laps, 176.688 mi (284.352 km)
- Average speed: 82.218 miles per hour (132.317 km/h)

Pole position
Driver	Brent Crews	Tricon Garage
- Time: 1:10.222

Most laps led
Driver	Connor Zilisch	Spire Motorsports
- Laps: 28

Fastest lap
Driver	Brent Crews	Tricon Garage
- Time: 1:11.616

Winner
No. 11	Kaden Honeycutt	Tricon Garage

Television in the United States
- Network: FS1
- Announcers: Jamie Little, Michael Waltrip, and Austin Dillon

Radio in the United States
- Radio: NRN
- Booth announcers: Alex Hayden and Todd Gordon
- Turn announcers: Dave Moody (Esses), Kyle Rickey (Turn 5) and Dan Hubbard (Turns 6–7)

The 2026 Bully Hill Vineyards 176 at The Glen was a NASCAR Craftsman Truck Series race held on Friday, May 8, 2026, at Watkins Glen International in Watkins Glen, New York. Contested over 74 laps—extended from 72 laps due to an overtime finish on the 2.45-mile (3.94 km) road course, it was the eighth race of the 2026 NASCAR Craftsman Truck Series season, and the eighth running of the event.

In a chaotic final stage, Kaden Honeycutt, driving for Tricon Garage, took advantage of the final overtime restart, grabbing the lead from Connor Zilisch and pulled away to earn his first career NASCAR Craftsman Truck Series win. Along with winning the ARCA Menards Series race on the same day, Honeycutt swept both Friday events. Zilisch dominated most of the event by winning the second stage and leading a race-high 28 laps. Zilisch finished second, and Shane van Gisbergen finished third. Daniel Hemric and Chandler Smith rounded out the top five, while A. J. Allmendinger, Brent Crews, Mini Tyrrell, Brenden Queen, and Connor Mosack rounded out the top ten.

== Report ==
=== Background ===
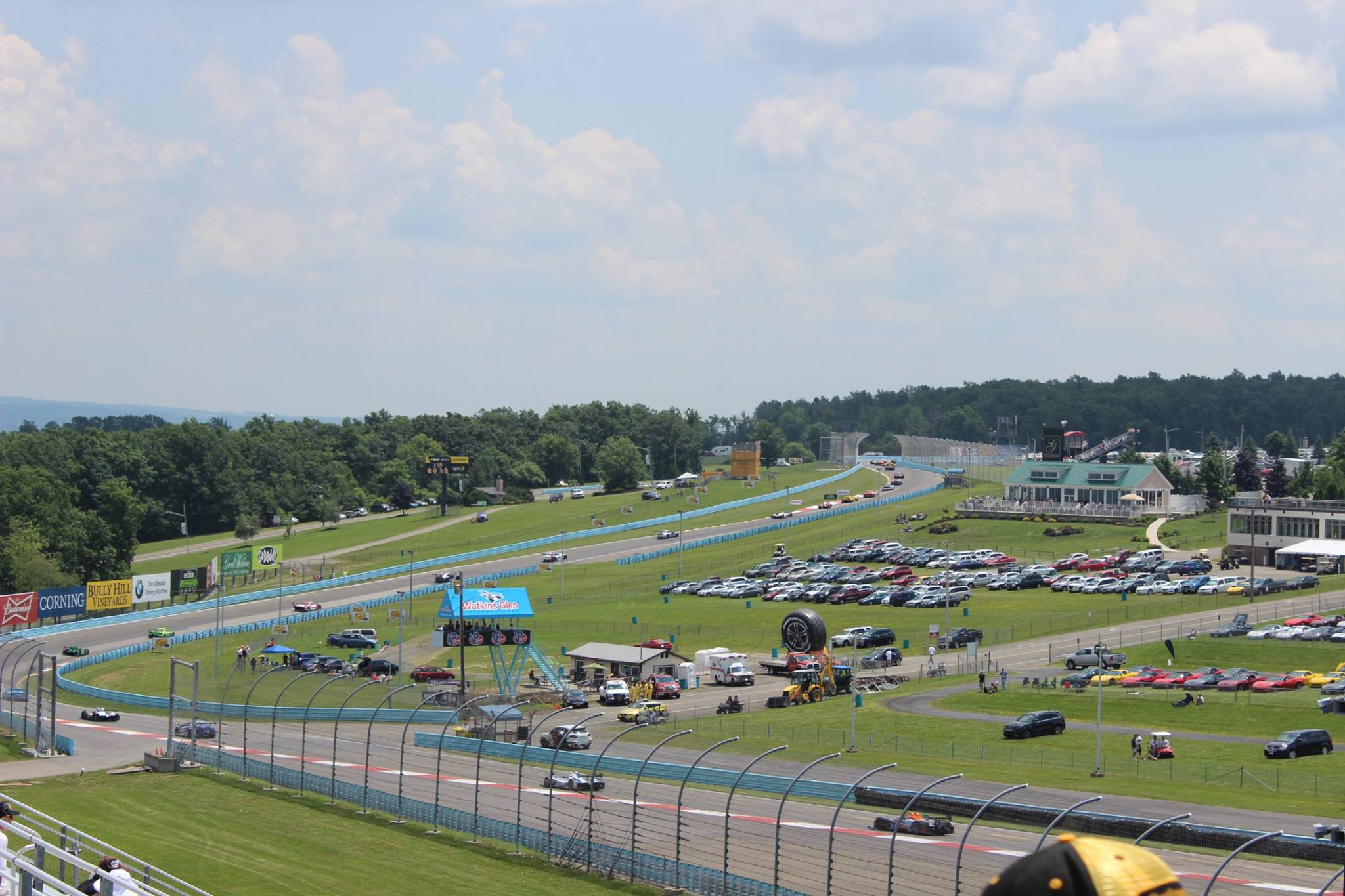
Watkins Glen International, the track where the race was held.

Watkins Glen International (nicknamed "The Glen") is an automobile race track located in Watkins Glen, New York at the southern tip of Seneca Lake. It was long known around the world as the home of the Formula One United States Grand Prix, which it hosted for twenty consecutive years (1961–1980), but the site has been home to road racing of nearly every class, including the World Sportscar Championship, Trans-Am, Can-Am, NASCAR Cup Series, the International Motor Sports Association and the IndyCar Series.

Initially, public roads in the village were used for the race course. In 1956 a permanent circuit for the race was built. In 1968 the race was extended to six hours, becoming the 6 Hours of Watkins Glen. The circuit's current layout has more or less been the same since 1971, although a chicane was installed at the uphill Esses in 1975 to slow cars through these corners, where there was a fatality during practice at the 1973 United States Grand Prix. The chicane was removed in 1985, but another chicane called the "Inner Loop" was installed in 1992 after J.D. McDuffie's fatal accident during the previous year's NASCAR Winston Cup event.

Bully Hill Vineyards was announced as the title sponsor on March 31, 2026.

==== Entry list ====
- (R) denotes rookie driver.
- (i) denotes driver who is ineligible for series driver points.

#	Driver	Team	Make
1	Brent Crews (i)	Tricon Garage	Toyota
2	Jackson Lee	Team Reaume	Ford
4	Shane van Gisbergen (i)	Niece Motorsports	Chevrolet
5	Adam Andretti	Tricon Garage	Toyota
7	Connor Mosack	Spire Motorsports	Chevrolet
9	Grant Enfinger	CR7 Motorsports	Chevrolet
10	Corey LaJoie	Kaulig Racing	Ram
11	Kaden Honeycutt	Tricon Garage	Toyota
12	Brenden Queen (R)	Kaulig Racing	Ram
13	Cole Butcher (R)	ThorSport Racing	Ford
14	Mini Tyrrell (R)	Kaulig Racing	Ram
15	Tanner Gray	Tricon Garage	Toyota
16	Justin Haley	Kaulig Racing	Ram
17	Gio Ruggiero	Tricon Garage	Toyota
18	Tyler Ankrum	McAnally–Hilgemann Racing	Chevrolet
19	Daniel Hemric	McAnally–Hilgemann Racing	Chevrolet
20	Toni Breidinger	McAnally–Hilgemann Racing	Chevrolet
22	Natalie Decker	Team Reaume	Ford
25	A. J. Allmendinger (i)	Kaulig Racing	Ram
26	Dawson Sutton	Rackley W.A.R.	Chevrolet
33	Stephen Mallozzi	Team Reaume	Ford
34	Layne Riggs	Front Row Motorsports	Ford
38	Chandler Smith	Front Row Motorsports	Ford
42	Tyler Reif	Niece Motorsports	Chevrolet
44	Andrés Pérez de Lara	Niece Motorsports	Chevrolet
45	Ross Chastain (i)	Niece Motorsports	Chevrolet
52	Stewart Friesen	Halmar Friesen Racing	Toyota
56	Timmy Hill	Hill Motorsports	Toyota
62	Wesley Slimp	Halmar Friesen Racing	Toyota
69	Dystany Spurlock (i)	MBM Motorsports	Toyota
71	Connor Zilisch (i)	Spire Motorsports	Chevrolet
76	Nathan Nicholson	Freedom Racing Enterprises	Chevrolet
77	Carson Hocevar (i)	Spire Motorsports	Chevrolet
81	Kris Wright	McAnally–Hilgemann Racing	Chevrolet
88	Ty Majeski	ThorSport Racing	Ford
91	Christian Eckes	McAnally–Hilgemann Racing	Chevrolet
98	Jake Garcia	ThorSport Racing	Ford
99	Ben Rhodes	ThorSport Racing	Ford
Official entry list

== Practice ==
The first and only practice session was held on Friday, May 8, at 11:00 AM EST, and lasted for 50 minutes.

Brent Crews, driving for Tricon Garage, set the fastest time in the session, with a lap of 1:11.681 seconds, and a speed of 123.045 miles per hour (198.022 km/h).

=== Practice results ===
Pos.	#	Driver	Team	Make	Time	Speed
1	1	Brent Crews (i)	Tricon Garage	Toyota	1:11.681	123.045
2	71	Connor Zilisch (i)	Spire Motorsports	Chevrolet	1:11.915	122.645
3	11	Kaden Honeycutt	Tricon Garage	Toyota	1:11.928	122.623
Full practice results

== Qualifying ==
Qualifying was held on Friday, May 1, at 12:05 PM EST. Since Watkins Glen International is a road course, the qualifying procedure used was a single round based system. All drivers were on track for a 30-minute timed session. Each driver had multiple laps to set a time. Whoever set the fastest time in that session won the pole.

Under a 2021 rule change, the timing line in road course qualifying is "not" the start-finish line. Instead, the timing line for qualifying was set at the exit of Turn 9. Brent Crews, driving for Tricon Garage, qualified on pole position with a lap of 1:10.222 seconds, and a speed of 125.602 miles per hour (202.137 km/h).

Two drivers failed to qualify: Toni Breidinger and Dystany Spurlock.

=== Qualifying results ===
Pos.	#	Driver	Team	Make	Time	Speed
1	1	Brent Crews (i)	Tricon Garage	Toyota	1:10.222	125.602
2	88	Ty Majeski	ThorSport Racing	Ford	1:10.536	125.043
3	19	Daniel Hemric	McAnally–Hilgemann Racing	Chevrolet	1:10.664	124.816
4	7	Connor Mosack	Spire Motorsports	Chevrolet	1:10.736	124.689
5	71	Connor Zilisch (i)	Spire Motorsports	Chevrolet	1:10.737	124.687
6	17	Gio Ruggiero	Tricon Garage	Toyota	1:10.830	124.524
7	11	Kaden Honeycutt	Tricon Garage	Toyota	1:10.861	124.469
8	4	Shane van Gisbergen (i)	Niece Motorsports	Chevrolet	1:10.916	124.372
9	99	Ben Rhodes	ThorSport Racing	Ford	1:10.950	124.313
10	77	Carson Hocevar (i)	Spire Motorsports	Chevrolet	1:10.963	124.290
11	38	Chandler Smith	Front Row Motorsports	Ford	1:10.985	124.252
12	9	Grant Enfinger	CR7 Motorsports	Chevrolet	1:11.006	124.215
13	34	Layne Riggs	Front Row Motorsports	Ford	1:11.050	124.138
14	15	Tanner Gray	Tricon Garage	Toyota	1:11.120	124.016
15	91	Christian Eckes	McAnally–Hilgemann Racing	Chevrolet	1:11.154	123.956
16	25	A. J. Allmendinger (i)	Kaulig Racing	Ram	1:11.186	123.901
17	98	Jake Garcia	ThorSport Racing	Ford	1:11.338	123.637
18	18	Tyler Ankrum	McAnally–Hilgemann Racing	Chevrolet	1:11.367	123.587
19	52	Stewart Friesen	Halmar Friesen Racing	Toyota	1:11.588	123.205
20	42	Tyler Reif	Niece Motorsports	Chevrolet	1:11.592	123.198
21	5	Adam Andretti	Tricon Garage	Toyota	1:11.596	123.191
22	44	Andrés Pérez de Lara	Niece Motorsports	Chevrolet	1:11.613	123.162
23	10	Corey LaJoie	Kaulig Racing	Ram	1:11.733	122.956
24	13	Cole Butcher (R)	ThorSport Racing	Ford	1:11.873	122.716
25	16	Justin Haley	Kaulig Racing	Ram	1:12.102	122.327
26	81	Kris Wright	McAnally–Hilgemann Racing	Chevrolet	1:12.152	122.242
27	26	Dawson Sutton	Rackley W.A.R.	Chevrolet	1:12.373	121.869
28	56	Timmy Hill	Hill Motorsports	Toyota	1:12.522	121.618
29	12	Brenden Queen (R)	Kaulig Racing	Ram	1:12.673	121.366
30	14	Mini Tyrrell (R)	Kaulig Racing	Ram	1:13.075	120.698
31	76	Nathan Nicholson	Freedom Racing Enterprises	Chevrolet	1:13.240	120.426
Qualified by owner's points
32	62	Wesley Slimp	Halmar Friesen Racing	Toyota	1:13.378	120.200
33	45	Ross Chastain (i)	Niece Motorsports	Chevrolet	1:14.005	119.181
34	2	Jackson Lee	Team Reaume	Ford	1:14.256	118.778
35	33	Stephen Mallozzi	Team Reaume	Ford	1:17.128	114.355
36	22	Natalie Decker	Team Reaume	Ford	1:18.998	111.648
Failed to qualify
37	20	Toni Breidinger	McAnally–Hilgemann Racing	Chevrolet	1:13.886	119.373
38	69	Dystany Spurlock (i)	MBM Motorsports	Toyota	1:15.982	116.080
Official qualifying results
Official starting lineup

== Race ==
=== Race results ===
==== Stage results ====
Stage One Laps: 20

Pos.	#	Driver	Team	Make	Pts
1	19	Daniel Hemric	McAnally–Hilgemann Racing	Chevrolet	10
2	17	Gio Ruggiero	Tricon Garage	Toyota	9
3	34	Layne Riggs	Front Row Motorsports	Ford	8
4	25	A. J. Allmendinger (i)	Kaulig Racing	Ram	0
5	18	Tyler Ankrum	McAnally–Hilgemann Racing	Chevrolet	6
6	45	Ross Chastain (i)	Niece Motorsports	Chevrolet	0
7	44	Andrés Pérez de Lara	Niece Motorsports	Chevrolet	4
8	15	Tanner Gray	Tricon Garage	Toyota	3
9	10	Corey LaJoie	Kaulig Racing	Ram	2
10	1	Brent Crews (i)	Tricon Garage	Toyota	0

Stage Two Laps: 20

Pos.	#	Driver	Team	Make	Pts
1	71	Connor Zilisch (i)	Spire Motorsports	Chevrolet	0
2	77	Carson Hocevar (i)	Spire Motorsports	Chevrolet	0
3	38	Chandler Smith	Front Row Motorsports	Ford	8
4	34	Layne Riggs	Front Row Motorsports	Ford	7
5	44	Andrés Pérez de Lara	Niece Motorsports	Chevrolet	6
6	4	Shane van Gisbergen (i)	Niece Motorsports	Chevrolet	0
7	9	Grant Enfinger	CR7 Motorsports	Chevrolet	4
8	18	Tyler Ankrum	McAnally–Hilgemann Racing	Chevrolet	3
9	42	Tyler Reif	Niece Motorsports	Chevrolet	2
10	7	Connor Mosack	Spire Motorsports	Chevrolet	1

=== Final Stage results ===
Stage Three Laps: 33

Fin	St	#	Driver	Team	Make	Laps	Led	Status	Pts
1	7	11	Kaden Honeycutt	Tricon Garage	Toyota	74	2	Running	55
2	5	71	Connor Zilisch (i)	Spire Motorsports	Chevrolet	74	28	Running	0
3	8	4	Shane van Gisbergen (i)	Niece Motorsports	Chevrolet	74	0	Running	0
4	3	19	Daniel Hemric	McAnally–Hilgemann Racing	Chevrolet	74	5	Running	43
5	11	38	Chandler Smith	Front Row Motorsports	Ford	74	0	Running	40
6	16	25	A. J. Allmendinger (i)	Kaulig Racing	Ram	74	0	Running	0
7	1	1	Brent Crews (i)	Tricon Garage	Toyota	74	19	Running	0
8	30	14	Mini Tyrrell (R)	Kaulig Racing	Ram	74	0	Running	29
9	29	12	Brenden Queen (R)	Kaulig Racing	Ram	74	0	Running	28
10	4	7	Connor Mosack	Spire Motorsports	Chevrolet	74	0	Running	28
11	17	98	Jake Garcia	ThorSport Racing	Ford	74	0	Running	26
12	23	10	Corey LaJoie	Kaulig Racing	Ram	74	0	Running	27
13	22	44	Andrés Pérez de Lara	Niece Motorsports	Chevrolet	74	0	Running	34
14	20	42	Tyler Reif	Niece Motorsports	Chevrolet	74	0	Running	25
15	6	17	Gio Ruggiero	Tricon Garage	Toyota	74	0	Running	31
16	15	91	Christian Eckes	McAnally–Hilgemann Racing	Chevrolet	74	0	Running	21
17	18	18	Tyler Ankrum	McAnally–Hilgemann Racing	Chevrolet	74	3	Running	29
18	19	52	Stewart Friesen	Halmar Friesen Racing	Toyota	74	0	Running	19
19	27	26	Dawson Sutton	Rackley W.A.R.	Chevrolet	74	0	Running	18
20	31	76	Nathan Nicholson	Freedom Racing Enterprises	Chevrolet	74	0	Running	17
21	13	34	Layne Riggs	Front Row Motorsports	Ford	74	0	Running	31
22	35	33	Stephen Mallozzi	Team Reaume	Ford	74	0	Running	15
23	25	16	Justin Haley	Kaulig Racing	Ram	74	0	Running	14
24	2	88	Ty Majeski	ThorSport Racing	Ford	74	0	Running	13
25	21	5	Adam Andretti	Tricon Garage	Toyota	73	0	Accident	12
26	34	2	Jackson Lee	Team Reaume	Ford	70	0	Running	11
27	28	56	Timmy Hill	Hill Motorsports	Toyota	68	0	Accident	10
28	33	45	Ross Chastain (i)	Niece Motorsports	Chevrolet	68	17	Accident	0
29	26	81	Kris Wright	McAnally–Hilgemann Racing	Chevrolet	64	0	Accident	8
30	14	15	Tanner Gray	Tricon Garage	Toyota	64	0	Running	10
31	10	77	Carson Hocevar (i)	Spire Motorsports	Chevrolet	60	0	Accident	0
32	9	99	Ben Rhodes	ThorSport Racing	Ford	60	0	Running	5
33	12	9	Grant Enfinger	CR7 Motorsports	Chevrolet	57	0	Transmission	8
34	32	62	Wesley Slimp	Halmar Friesen Racing	Toyota	34	0	Accident	3
35	24	13	Cole Butcher (R)	ThorSport Racing	Ford	31	0	DVP	2
36	36	22	Natalie Decker	Team Reaume	Ford	20	0	Too Slow	1
Official race results

=== Race statistics ===
- Lead changes: 10 among 6 different drivers
- Cautions/Laps: 6 for 15 laps
- Red flags: 0
- Time of race: 2 hours, 10 minutes and 43 seconds
- Average speed: 82.218 miles per hour (132.317 km/h)

== Standings after the race ==
Drivers' Championship standings

	Pos	Driver	Points
	1	Kaden Honeycutt	312
	2	Chandler Smith	283 (–29)
	3	Layne Riggs	269 (–43)
	4	Gio Ruggiero	257 (–55)
1	5	Christian Eckes	241 (–71)
1	6	Ben Rhodes	228 (–83)
	7	Ty Majeski	225 (–87)
	8	Corey Heim	204 (–108)
	9	Tyler Ankrum	194 (–118)
3	10	Daniel Hemric	189 (–123)
Official driver's standings

Manufacturers' Championship standings

Pos	Manufacturer	Points
1	Toyota	355
2	Chevrolet	310 (–45)
3	Ford	301 (–54)
4	Ram	225 (–130)

- Note: Only the first 10 positions are included for the driver standings.

Previous race: 2026 SpeedyCash.com 250	NASCAR Craftsman Truck Series; 2026 season	Next race: Ecosave 200
