= 2024 IMSA VP Racing SportsCar Challenge =

Motor racing championship

The 2024 IMSA VP Racing SportsCar Challenge season was the second season of the IMSA VP Racing SportsCar Challenge after being established in 2023 as a replacement for the IMSA Prototype Challenge. The season began on January 20 at Daytona International Speedway and concluded on October 19 at Road Atlanta. After IMSA's removal of the LMP3 class from the 2024 IMSA SportsCar Championship, this series is now the highest tier of racing for LMP3s in the United States.

== Calendar ==
The provisional schedule was released on August 4, 2023, at IMSA's annual State of the Sport Address, featuring twelve rounds split across six race weekends. Five of the six events had confirmed dates.

Round	Circuit	Date
1	(United States) Daytona International Speedway, Daytona Beach, Florida	January 19–21
2	(United States) St. Petersburg Street Circuit, St. Petersburg, Florida	March 8–10
3	(United States) Mid-Ohio Sports Car Course, Lexington, Ohio	June 7–9
4	(Canada) Canadian Tire Motorsport Park, Bowmanville, Ontario	July 12–14
5	(United States) Virginia International Raceway, Alton, Virginia	August 23–25
6	(United States) Michelin Raceway Road Atlanta, Braselton, Georgia, Georgia	October 9–12

== Entry list ==
=== LMP3 ===
Manufacturer	Car	Team	No.	Driver	Rounds
Duqueine	Duqueine D-08	(Germany) Gebhardt Intralogistics Motorsports	30	(Germany) Valentino Catalano	6
Duqueine	Duqueine D-08	(Germany) Gebhardt Intralogistics Motorsports	31	(Germany) Markus Pommer	6
Duqueine	Duqueine D-08	(United States) Fast MD Racing with Remstar	87	(Canada) Marco Kacic	1
Duqueine	Duqueine D-08	(United States) Fast MD Racing with Remstar	87	(United States) Jagger Jones	2–6
Ligier	Ligier JS P320	(United States) MLT Motorsports	6	(United States) Steven Aghakhani	All
Ligier	Ligier JS P320	(United States) Performance Tech Motorsports	7	(United States) Alex Kirby	1–5
Ligier	Ligier JS P320	(United States) Performance Tech Motorsports	18	(United States) Jordan Menzin	3–5
Ligier	Ligier JS P320	(United States) Performance Tech Motorsports	38	(United States) Scott Locke	1
Ligier	Ligier JS P320	(United States) Performance Tech Motorsports	38	(Canada) Jonathan Woolridge	2–4
Ligier	Ligier JS P320	(Ecuador) Escuderia ABRO	23	(Ecuador) Miguel Villagomez	1–3, 5–6
Ligier	Ligier JS P320	(United States) Sean Creech Motorsport	33	(United States) Lance Willsey	1
Ligier	Ligier JS P320	(United States) Rick Ware Racing with Ave Motorsports	51	(United States) Cody Ware	1–2
Ligier	Ligier JS P320	(United States) Rick Ware Racing with Ave Motorsports	51	(United States) Ryan Phinny	3–6
Ligier	Ligier JS P320	(United States) Ave Motorsports	61	(Canada) George Staikos	1, 4, 6
Ligier	Ligier JS P320	(United States) Ave Motorsports	61	(United States) Ryan Phinny	2
Ligier	Ligier JS P320	(United States) Ave Motorsports	61	(United States) Seth Lucas	3
Ligier	Ligier JS P320	(Germany) Mishumotors	70	(Germany) Mirco Schultis	1–2
Ligier	Ligier JS P320	(United States) Forte Racing	77	(United States) Brian Thienes	All
Ligier	Ligier JS P320	(United States) Forte Racing	86	(United States) Jon Hirshberg	5–6

=== GSX ===
Manufacturer	Car	Team	No.	Driver	Rounds
Aston Martin	Aston Martin Vantage AMR GT4	(United States) Prosport Competition	2	(United States) Jason Bell	2
Aston Martin	Aston Martin Vantage AMR GT4	(United States) Archangel Motorsports	22	(United States) Robbie McWilliams	1
Aston Martin	Aston Martin Vantage AMR GT4	(United States) Archangel Motorsports	22	(United States) Todd Coleman	2
Aston Martin	Aston Martin Vantage AMR GT4	(United States) Ruckus Racing	45	(United States) Scott Blind	1–5
Aston Martin	Aston Martin Vantage AMR GT4	(United States) van der Steur Racing	82	(United States) Brady Behrman	1
Aston Martin	Aston Martin Vantage AMR GT4	(United States) van der Steur Racing	82	(United States) Jackson Lee	2
Aston Martin	Aston Martin Vantage AMR GT4 Evo	(United States) Rebel Rock Racing	72	(United States) Frank DePew	1–5
BMW	BMW M4 GT4 Gen II	(United States) Team ACP by Random Vandals	9	(United States) Nathan Martin	1
BMW	BMW M4 GT4 Gen II	(United States) Swish Motorsports	12	(United States) Michael Dayton	1–4
BMW	BMW M4 GT4 Gen II	(United States) Stephen Cameron Racing	19	(United States) Sean Quinlan	1
BMW	BMW M4 GT4 Gen II	(United States) Stephen Cameron Racing	19	(United States) Gregory Liefooghe	2
BMW	BMW M4 GT4 Gen II	(United States) Stephen Cameron Racing	43	(United States) Gregory Liefooghe	1
BMW	BMW M4 GT4 Gen II	(United States) Stephen Cameron Racing	43	(United States) Sean Quinlan	2
BMW	BMW M4 GT4 Gen II	(United States) Auto Technic Racing	25	(United States) Mark Brummond	1–3, 5
BMW	BMW M4 GT4 Gen II	(United States) Auto Technic Racing	26	(United States) Christopher Tasca	1
BMW	BMW M4 GT4 Gen II	(United States) Split Decision Motorsports	88	(United States) Patrick Wilmot	1–5
BMW	BMW M4 GT4 Gen II	(United States) Turner Motorsport	96	(United States) Joe Dalton	1, 3
BMW	BMW M4 GT4 Gen II	(United States) Turner Motorsport	96	(United States) Vincent Barletta	2, 5
BMW	BMW M4 GT4 Gen II	(United States) Turner Motorsport	97	(United States) Vincent Barletta	3
Ford	Ford Mustang GT4 (2024)	(United States) KohR Motorsports	59	(United States) Luca Mars	1–5
Ford	Ford Mustang GT4 (2024)	(United States) Stephen Cameron Racing	19	(United States) Sean Quinlan	4–5
Ford	Ford Mustang GT4 (2024)	(Canada) Polito Racing	98	(Canada) Jack Polito	4
McLaren	McLaren Artura GT4	(Canada) Motorsport in Action	21	(Canada) Jesse Lazare	1–5
Mercedes-AMG	Mercedes-AMG GT4	(United States) Thaze Competition	37	(United States) Marc Miller	1
Mercedes-AMG	Mercedes-AMG GT4	(United States) Thaze Competition	37	(United States) Eddie Killeen	2–4
Mercedes-AMG	Mercedes-AMG GT4	(United States) Thaze Competition	78	(Canada) Jonathan Woolridge	1
Mercedes-AMG	Mercedes-AMG GT4	(United States) Thaze Competition	78	(United States) Josh Green	3–4
Porsche	Porsche 718 Cayman GT4 RS Clubsport	(United States) KMW Motorsports with TMR Engineering	5	(United States) Angus Rogers	1–5
Porsche	Porsche 718 Cayman GT4 RS Clubsport	(United States) BGB Motorsports	17	(United States) Will Wachs	1–3
Porsche	Porsche 718 Cayman GT4 RS Clubsport	(United States) BGB Motorsports	808	(United States) Jim Jonsin	1
Porsche	Porsche 718 Cayman GT4 RS Clubsport	(United States) BGB Motorsports	808	(United States) Thomas Collingwood	2
Porsche	Porsche 718 Cayman GT4 RS Clubsport	(United States) Baby Bull Racing	44	Moisey Uretsky (Note: Uretsky is Russian, but he competes under as neutral competitor as Russian national emblems were banned by the FIA following the Russian invasion of Ukraine.)	1, 4–5
Porsche	Porsche 718 Cayman GT4 RS Clubsport	(United States) Baby Bull Racing	55	(United States) Michael Cooper	1
Porsche	Porsche 718 Cayman GT4 RS Clubsport	(United States) Czabok-Simpson Motorsport	66	(United States) Jackson Lee	1
Toyota	Toyota GR Supra GT4 Evo	(United States) BSI Racing	67	(United States) Eric Thompson	1

== Race results ==
Bold indicates overall winner.

Round		Circuit	P3 Winner	GSX Winner
1	R1	(United States) Daytona	**(United States) No. 6 MLT Motorsports**	(United States) No. 59 KohR Motorsports
1	R1	(United States) Daytona	(United States) **Steven Aghakhani**	(United States) Luca Mars
1	R2	(United States) Daytona	**(United States) No. 6 MLT Motorsports**	(United States) No. 59 KohR Motorsports
1	R2	(United States) Daytona	(United States) **Steven Aghakhani**	(United States) Luca Mars
2	R1	(United States) St. Petersburg	**(United States) No. 87 FastMD Racing with Remstar**	(Canada) No. 21 Motorsport in Action
2	R1	(United States) St. Petersburg	**(United States) Jagger Jones**	(Canada) Jesse Lazare
2	R2	(United States) St. Petersburg	**(United States) No. 87 FastMD Racing with Remstar**	(Canada) No. 21 Motorsport in Action
2	R2	(United States) St. Petersburg	**(United States) Jagger Jones**	(Canada) Jesse Lazare
3	R1	(United States) Mid-Ohio	**(United States) No. 87 FastMD Racing with Remstar**	(United States) No. 59 KohR Motorsports
3	R1	(United States) Mid-Ohio	**(United States) Jagger Jones**	(United States) Luca Mars
3	R2	(United States) Mid-Ohio	**(United States) No. 87 FastMD Racing with Remstar**	(Canada) No. 21 Motorsport in Action
3	R2	(United States) Mid-Ohio	**(United States) Jagger Jones**	(Canada) Jesse Lazare
4	R1	(Canada) Mosport	**(United States) No. 6 MLT Motorsports**	(Canada) No. 98 Polito Racing
4	R1	(Canada) Mosport	(United States) **Steven Aghakhani**	(Canada) Jack Polito
4	R2	(Canada) Mosport	**(United States) No. 87 FastMD Racing with Remstar**	(United States) No. 78 Thaze Competition
4	R2	(Canada) Mosport	**(United States) Jagger Jones**	(United States) Josh Green
5	R1	(United States) Virginia	**(United States) No. 87 FastMD Racing with Remstar**	(United States) No. 59 KohR Motorsports
5	R1	(United States) Virginia	**(United States) Jagger Jones**	(United States) Luca Mars
5	R2	(United States) Virginia	**(United States) No. 87 FastMD Racing with Remstar**	(United States) No. 59 KohR Motorsports
5	R2	(United States) Virginia	**(United States) Jagger Jones**	(United States) Luca Mars
6	R1	(United States) Road Atlanta	**(United States) No. 6 MLT Motorsports**	(United States) No. 59 KohR Motorsports
6	R1	(United States) Road Atlanta	(United States) **Steven Aghakhani**	(United States) Bob Michaelian
6	R2	(United States) Road Atlanta	**(United States) No. 87 FastMD Racing with Remstar**	(United States) No. 9 Kingpin Racing
6	R2	(United States) Road Atlanta	**(United States) Jagger Jones**	(United States) Tyler Hoffman

== Championship Standings ==
=== Points system ===
Championship points are awarded in each class at the finish of each event. Points are awarded based on finishing positions in the race as shown in the chart below.

Position	1	2	3	4	5	6	7	8	9	10	11	12	13	14	15	16	17	18	19	20	21	22	23	24	25	26	27	28	29	30+
Race	350	320	300	280	260	250	240	230	220	210	200	190	180	170	160	150	140	130	120	110	100	90	80	70	60	50	40	30	20	10

=== LMP3 Driver's Championship ===
Pos.	Drivers	DAY (United States)		STP (United States)		MOH (United States)		MOS (Canada)		VIR (United States)		ATL (United States)		Points
1	(United States) Steven Aghakhani	**1**	**1**	2	6	2	2	**1**	**2**	2	2	1	2	3890
**2**	(United States) Jagger Jones			**1**	**1**	**1**	**1**	8	1	**1**	**1**	**4**	1	3310
3	(United States) Brian Thienes	5	4	7	3	8	8	5	4	5	3	6	5	3150
4	(Ecuador) Miguel Villagomez	10	3	6	2	3	6			3	7	5	8	2660
5	(United States) Alex Kirby	2	10	8	DNS	6	5	3	3	8	5			2360
6	(United States) Ryan Phinny			4	4	4	4	4	5	4	4	9	9	2220
7	(Canada) Jonathan Woolridge			3	5	7	7	2	6					1610
8	(Canada) George Staikos	8	7					7	7			8	7	1420
9	(United States) Jordan Menzin					9	9	6	8	7	6			1410
10	(Germany) Mirco Schultis	6	5	5	7									1010
11	(United States) Jon Hirshberg									6	8	7	6	970
12	(United States) Cody Ware	3	8	9	DNS									750
13	(Canada) Marco Kacic	4	2											600
14	(Germany) Markus Pommer											2	4	600
15	(Germany) Valentino Catalano											3	3	600
16	(United States) Seth Lucas					5	3							560
17	(United States) Lance Willsey	7	6											490
18	(United States) Scott Locke	9	9											440

Colour	Result
Gold	Winner
Silver	Second place
Bronze	Third place
Green	Points classification
Blue	Non-points classification
Blue	Non-classified finish (NC)
Purple	Retired, not classified (Ret)
Red	Did not qualify (DNQ)
Red	Did not pre-qualify (DNPQ)
Black	Disqualified (DSQ)
White	Did not start (DNS)
White	Withdrew (WD)
White	Race cancelled (C)
Blank	Did not practice (DNP)
Blank	Did not arrive (DNA)
Blank	Excluded (EX)

**Bold** - Pole position
Italics - Fastest lap

=== GSX Driver's Championship ===
Pos.	Drivers	DAY (United States)		STP (United States)		MOH (United States)		MOS (Canada)		VIR (United States)		ATL (United States)	Points
1	(United States) Luca Mars	1	**1**	3	4	1	3	2	5	**1**	**1**		3210
2	(United States) Patrick Wilmot	5	5	17	5	4	4	5	3	3	2		2660
3	(United States) Scott Blind	12	8	6	9	5	5	6	4	7	5		2440
4	(Canada) Jesse Lazare	13	4	**1**	**1**	**3**	**1**	**12**	**2**	DNS	DNS		2320
5	(United States) Angus Rogers	15	13	9	7	11	10	7	6	6	4		2230
6	(United States) Michael Dayton	10	9	4	6	8	6	8	10				1880
7	(Australia) Sean Quinlan	9	12	5	16			9	8	5	3		1830
8	(United States) Mark Brummond	8	18	7	13	6	7			2	9		1810
9	(United States) Frank DePew	DNS	DNS	14	15	9	8	10	9	10	8		1650
10	(United States) Josh Green					2	2	3	1				1290
11	(United States) Vincent Barletta			16	17	7	13			8	6		1190
12	(United States) Jackson Lee	7	6	2	2								1130
13	(United States) Gregory Liefooghe	2	3	15	3								1080
14	(United States) Will Wachs	17	17	11	12	13	11						1050
15	(United States) Eddie Killeen			10	14	12	12	11	DNS				960
16	Moisey Uretsky	18	11					4	DNS	4	DNS		890
17	(United States) Brady Behrman	14	10							9	7		840
18	(United States) Joe Dalton	16	15			10	9						740
19	(United States) Michael Cooper	**4**	2										600
20	(Canada) Jack Polito							1	7				590
21	(United States) Eric Thompson	6	7										490
22	(United States) Thomas Collingwood			8	10								440
23	(United States) Marc Miller	3	19										420
24	(United States) Jason Bell			13	8								410
25	(United States) Todd Coleman			12	11								390
26	(United States) Jim Jonsin	11	14										370
27	(United States) Christopher Tasca	20	16										260
28	(United States) Robbie McWilliams	19	20										230
29	(United States) Nathan Martin	DNS	DNS										0
30	(Canada) Jonathan Woolridge	DNS	DNS										0

=== LMP3 Bronze Drivers Cup ===
Pos.	Drivers	DAY (United States)		STP (United States)		MOH (United States)		MOS (Canada)		VIR (United States)		ATL (United States)	Points
1	(United States) Brian Thienes	**1**	2	3	2	2	2	**1**	**1**	2	1		3300
2	(Ecuador) Miguel Villagomez	6	1	**2**	**1**	**1**	**1**			**1**	**3**		2620
3	(United States) Jordan Menzin					3	3	2	3	4	2		1820
4	(Germany) Mirco Schultis	2	3	1	3								1270
5	(Canada) George Staikos	4	5					3	2				1160
6	(United States) Lance Willsey	3	4										580
7	(United States) Jon Hirshberg									3	4		580
8	(United States) Scott Locke	5	6										510

=== GSX Bronze Drivers Cup ===
Pos.	Drivers	DAY (United States)		STP (United States)		MOH (United States)		MOS (Canada)		VIR (United States)		ATL (United States)	Points
1	(United States) Scott Blind	5	**1**	3	4	**1**	**1**	2	**1**	5	3		3120
2	(United States) Angus Rogers	7	6	6	2	7	6	3	2	4	2		2770
3	(United States) Michael Dayton	3	2	1	1	4	2	4	5				2460
4	(Australia) Sean Quinlan	2	5	2	11			5	3	3	1		2310
5	(United States) Mark Brummond	1	11	4	8	2	3			1	7		2270
6	(United States) Frank DePew	DNS	DNS	11	10	5	4	6	4	8	6		1960
7	(United States) Vincent Barletta			12	12	3	9			6	4		900
8	(United States) Will Wachs	9	10	8	7	9	7						1360
9	Moisey Uretsky	10	4					**1**	DNS	**2**	**DNS**		1160
10	(United States) Eddie Killeen			7	9	8	8	7	DNS				1160
11	(United States) Brady Behrman	**6**	3							7	5		1050
12	(United States) Joe Dalton	8	8			6	5						970
13	(United States) Jim Jonsin	4	7										520
14	(United States) Thomas Collingwood			5	5								520
15	(United States) Jason Bell			**10**	**3**								510
16	(United States) Todd Coleman			9	6								470
17	(United States) Christopher Tasca	12	9										410
18	(United States) Robbie McWilliams	11	12										390

=== LMP3 Team's Championship ===
Pos.	Team	DAY (United States)		STP (United States)		MOH (United States)		MOS (Canada)		VIR (United States)		ATL (United States)	Points
1	#87 Fast MD Racing with Remstar	4	2	**1**	**1**	**1**	**1**	8	1	**1**	**1**		3280
2	#6 MLT Motorsports	**1**	**1**	2	6	2	2	**1**	**2**	2	2		3220
3	#77 Forte Racing	5	4	7	3	8	8	5	4	5	3		2640
4	#51 Rick Ware Racing with Ave Motorsports	3	8	9	DNS	4	4	4	5	4	4		2410
5	#7 Performance Tech Motorsports	2	10	8	DNS	6	5	3	3	8	5		2360
6	#23 Escuderia ABRO	10	3	6	2	3	6			3	7		2170
7	#61 Ave Motorsports	8	7	4	4	5	3	7	7				2070
8	#38 Performance Tech Motorsports	9	9	3	5	7	7	2	6				2050
9	#18 Performance Tech Motorsports					9	9	6	8	7	6		920
10	#70 Mishumotors	6	5	5	7								1010
11	#33 Sean Creech Motorsport	7	6										490
12	#86 Forte Racing									6	8		480

=== GSX Team's Championship ===
Pos.	Team	DAY (United States)		STP (United States)		MOH (United States)		MOS (Canada)		VIR (United States)		ATL (United States)	Points
1	#59 KohR Motorsports	1	**1**	3	4	1	3	2	5	**1**	**1**		3210
2	#88 Split Decision Motorsports	5	5	17	5	4	4	5	3	3	2		2660
3	#45 Ruckus Racing	12	8	6	9	5	5	6	4	7	5		2440
4	#21 Motorsports in Action	13	4	**1**	**1**	**3**	1	**12**	**2**	DNS	DNS		2320
5	#5 KMW Motorsports with TMR	15	13	9	7	11	10	7	6	6	4		2230
6	#19 Stephen Cameron Racing	9	12	15	3			9	8	5	3		1880
7	#12 Swish Motorsports	10	9	4	6	8	6	8	10				1880
8	#25 Auto Technic Racing	8	18	7	13	6	7			2	9		1810
9	#72 Rebel Rock Racing	DNS	DNS	14	15	9	8	10	9	10	8		1650
10	#96 Turner Motorsport	16	15	16	17	10	9			8	6		1510
11	#82 van der Steur Racing	14	10	2	2					9	7		1480
12	#37 Thaze Competition	3	19	10	14	12	12	11	DNS				1380
13	#78 Thaze Competition	DNS	DNS			2	2	3	1				1290
14	#17 BGB Motorsports	17	17	11	12	13	11						1050
15	#43 Stephen Cameron Racing	2	3	5	16								1030
16	#44 Baby Bull Racing	18	11					4	DNS	4	DNS		890
17	#808 BGB Motorsports	11	14	8	10								810
18	#22 Archangel Motorsports	19	20	12	11								620
19	#55 Baby Bull Racing	**4**	2										600
20	#67 BSI Racing	6	7										490
21	#98 Polito Racing							1	7				590
22	#66 Czabok-Simpson Motorsport	7	6										490
23	#97 Turner Motorsport					7	13						420
24	#2 Prosport Competition			13	8								410
25	#26 Auto Technic Racing	20	16										260
26	#9 Team ACP by Random Vandals	DNS	DNS										0

=== GSX Manufacturer's Championship ===
Pos.	Drivers	DAY (United States)		STP (United States)		MOH (United States)		MOS (Canada)		VIR (United States)		ATL (United States)	Points
1	(United States) Ford	1	1	3	4	1	3	1	5	1	1		3240
2	(Germany) BMW	2	3	4	3	4	4	5	3	2	2		2980
3	(Germany) Porsche	4	2	8	7	11	10	4	6	4	4		2770
4	(United Kingdom) Aston Martin	12	8	2	2	5	5	6	4	7	5		2760
5	(United Kingdom) McLaren	13	4	1	1	3	1	12	2	DNS	DNS		2440
6	(Germany) Mercedes-AMG	3	19	10	14	2	2	3	1				2350
7	(Japan) Toyota	6	7										520
