= Jackson Lee (racing driver) =

American racing driver (born 2002)

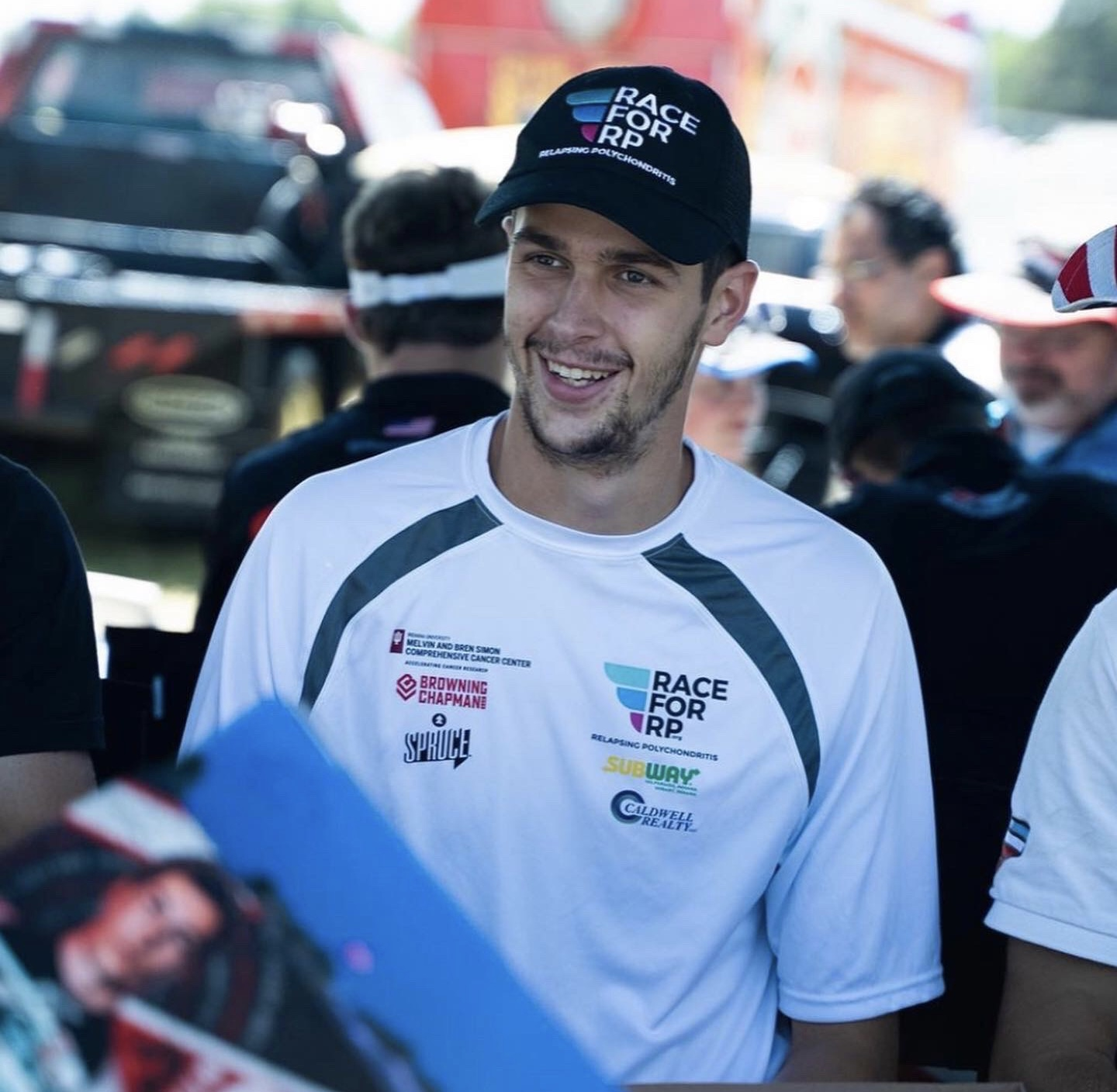
- Lee in 2022
- Born: September 6, 2002 (age 24) Indianapolis, Indiana, U.S.
- Categorisation: FIA Silver
- Wins: 7
- Podiums: 21
- Poles: 5
- Fastest laps: 8

Previous series
- Lucas Oil Formula Car Series F1600 Championship Series BRSC National Formula Ford 1600 Championship USF2000 Championship USF Pro 2000 Championship TC America IMSA VP Racing SportsCar Challenge IMSA Michelin Pilot Challenge Lamborghini Super Trofeo North America World Racing League

NASCAR FedEx Freight Truck Series career
- 5 races run over 1 year
- 2026 position: 47th
- Best finish: 47th (2026)
- First race: 2026 OnlyBulls Green Flag 150 (St. Petersburg)
- Last race: 2026 Zero Carbon Bioethanol 150 (Phoenix)
Wins	Top tens	Poles
0	0	0
- Statistics up to date as of November 8, 2026.

Jackson Lee (born September 6, 2002) is an American racing driver from Indianapolis, IN. He competes part-time in Lamborghini Super Trofeo North America and the Zenith Racing Series for Automatic Racing.

== Racing career ==
=== Early career ===
Lee began racing in quarter midgets at seven years old, mostly at Mini Indy at the Indiana State Fairgrounds in Indianapolis and added karting in 2013, predominantly in regional events at New Castle Motorsports Park.

=== 2018 ===
In 2018, Lee won a partial scholarship in the Lucas Oil School of Racing Shootout at Sebring International Raceway.

=== 2019 ===
==== Lucas Oil Formula Car Series/FRP F1600 Championship ====
Lee won the first race of the season at Mid-Ohio Sports Car Course and led the championship near the midpoint of the season before finishing fourth with two wins and six podiums. He also competed in a weekend for Rice Race Prep in FRP F1600 at Summit Point which included second and fourth-place finishes.

=== 2020 ===
==== FRP F1600 Championship/Team USA Scholarship ====
Lee joined Rice Race Prep for the 2020 F1600 Championship and was sitting second in points with two wins and seven straight podiums when he was named as a Team USA Scholarship winner which prompted a switch to BRSCC National Formula Ford 1600 in England. The program with Low Dempsey Racing included a podium in the heat race and tenth-place finish in the Formula Ford Festival Grand Final at Brands Hatch. The Walter Hayes Trophy at Silverstone included a fourth-place finish in the heat race but a DNF after contact in the Grand Final.

=== 2021 ===
==== USF2000 Championship ====
Lee was the highest points finisher for JHDD in his rookie season in the Road to Indy with a best finish of ninth at the Indianapolis Motor Speedway and the fastest race lap in race 2 at Mid Ohio. He competed in 15 of the 18 races.

=== 2022 ===
==== USF2000 Championship ====
After posting the second quickest lap in the 2021 post-season open test at the Indianapolis Motor Speedway, Lee signed with Cape Motorsports for 2022. The season included a seventh-place finish in the opening weekend at St. Petersburg and top-ten finishes at Barber Motorsports Park and Mid Ohio before extensive crash damage expenses ended the season with five events remaining.

=== 2023 ===
==== USF Pro 2000 Championship ====
Lee moved up a step in 2023 to race for former Indy Lights race winner Peter Dempsey and Turn 3 Motorsport for a partial season. A fifth-place finish at Sebring and a top-ten at Indianapolis Motor Speedway road course event were the highlights.

==== TC America ====
Lee made his sports car debut during the Indy 8 Hour event in October at the Indianapolis Motor Speedway. He raced for AOA Racing in TC America in the top TCX class. He was fastest in the only practice and finished seventh and fourth in the two races after qualifying sixth.

=== 2024 ===
==== IMSA VP Racing SportsCar Challenge ====
Lee finished seventh and sixth in the opening event at Daytona for Czabok-Simpson Porsche and then second in both races for van der Steur Aston Martin at St. Petersburg with the fastest lap in race 1 and most laps led in race 2.

==== IMSA Michelin Pilot Challenge #2 & #67 Czabok-Simpson Porsche Cayman GT4 ====
Lee competed in five events in the top support series in IMSA with multiple teammates and earned a best finish of 11th at the Indianapolis Motor Speedway.

=== 2025 ===
==== IMSA VP Racing SportsCar Challenge #2 Browning Chapman CSM Porsche Cayman GT4 ====
In the opening weekend at Daytona, Lee finished sixth and second. Race 2 included a drive from ninth to second in wet conditions and represented the first podium for CSM.

==== Lamborghini Super Trofeo North America ====
Lee contested the first half of the season with Forty7 Motorsports in both the Am and Pro-Am class with a different teammate in each of the three weekends. He scored a podium in the Am class in the opening event at Sebring and a pole for race 2. He also secured a podium as the finishing driver in Pro-Am in race 1 at Laguna Seca. Lee then moved to Wayne Taylor Racing and the Pro-Am class with Trent Hindman for the Road America and Indianapolis events. The pair of former Team USA Scholarship winners won three of four races in class and finished second overall in both races at Indianapolis. Lee won the pole as fastest qualifier in class at Indianapolis. He did not compete in the final two rounds at Misano, Italy.

=== 2026 ===
==== NASCAR ====
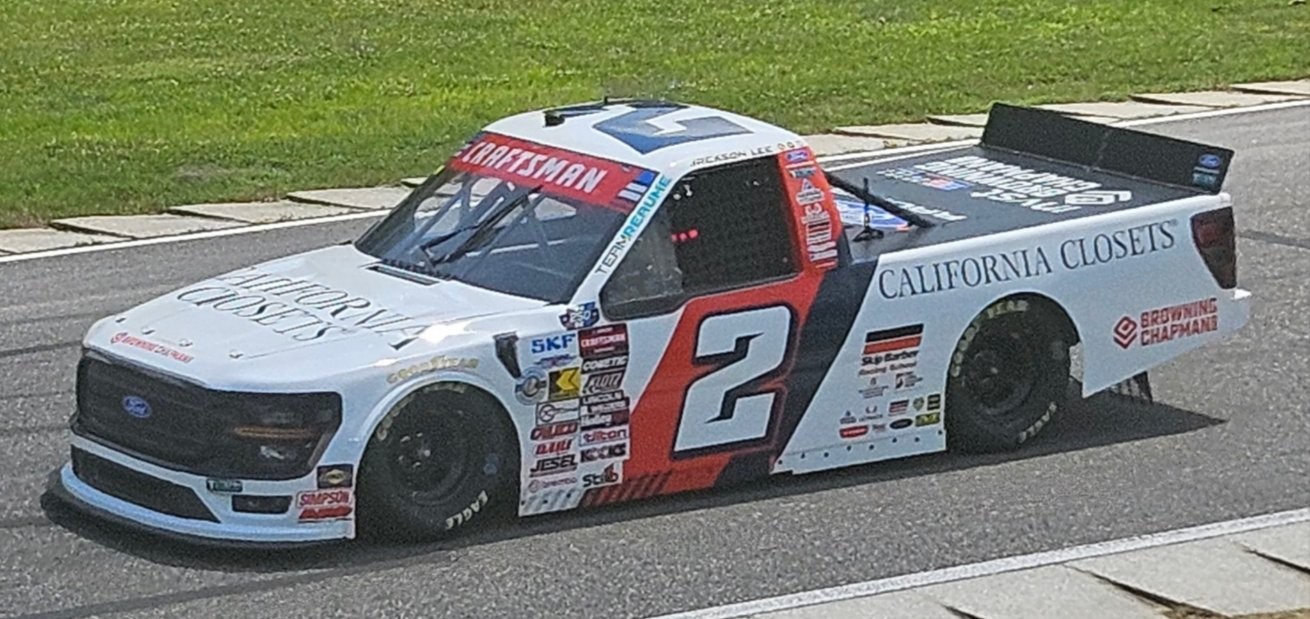
Lee's No. 2 truck at Lime Rock Park in 2026

On February 5, 2026, it was announced that Lee would attempt to make his debut in the NASCAR Craftsman Truck Series at the St. Petersburg Street Circuit, driving the No. 22 Ford for Team Reaume. After practice and qualifying were rained out, he moved from the back into the top 20 before being turned from behind. He then raced in the No. 2 Ford for Team Reaume at Watkins Glen, San Diego and Lime Rock. Mechanical issues early at Watkins Glen put Lee several laps down. At San Diego, he was running 7th in Stage 3 before getting collected in a pair of incidents. At Lime Rock, Lee finished 13th, the best non-oval result in Team Reaume's history.

Lamborghini Super Trofeo North America

Lee competed in the first two events and four races of the season for Forty7 Motorsports teaming with Matt Jaskol and Dominic Starkweather in the Pro Class with a best finish of 7th.

OTHER

Lee is an instructor for the Skip Barber Racing School, the Lucas Oil School of Racing, for private clients and Automatic Racing in the Zenith Racing Series and World Racing League.

== Personal life ==
Lee is the son of longtime NBC Sports and FOX Sports IndyCar & IMSA sportscar broadcaster Kevin Lee. He has been part of the Motorsports Engineering program at Indiana University–Purdue University Indianapolis.

== Motorsports career results ==
=== Career summary ===
Season	Series	Team	Races	Wins	Poles	F/Laps	Podiums	Points	Position
2019	F1600 Championship Series	Rice Race Prep	3	0	0	1	1	99	19th
2019	Lucas Oil Formula Car Race Series	N/A	18	2	1	3	6	432	4th
2020	F1600 Championship Series	Rice Race Prep	12	2	0	2	7	440	4th
2021	U.S. F2000 National Championship	Jay Howard Driver Development	14	0	0	1	0	73	18th
2022	U.S. F2000 National Championship	Cape Motorsports	13	0	0	0	0	109	15th
2023	USF Pro 2000 Championship	Turn 3 Motorsport	11	0	0	0	0	84	21st
2023	TC America Series - TCX	AOA Racing	2	0	0	0	0	18	13th
2024	IMSA VP Racing SportsCar Challenge - GSX	Czabok-Simpson Motorsport	2	0	0	0	0	570	11th
2024	IMSA VP Racing SportsCar Challenge - GSX	van der Steur Racing	2	0	0	1	2	570	11th
2024	Michelin Pilot Challenge - GS	Czabok-Simpson Motorsport	5	0	0	0	0	800	28th
2025	IMSA VP Racing SportsCar Challenge – GSX	Czabok-Simpson Motorsport	2	0	0	0	1	570	16th
2025	Lamborghini Super Trofeo North America – Pro-Am	Forty7 Motorsports	2	0	1	0	1	63	7th
2025	Lamborghini Super Trofeo North America – Pro-Am	Wayne Taylor Racing	4	3	1	0	3	63	7th
2025	Lamborghini Super Trofeo North America – Am	Forty7 Motorsports	4	0	0	0	1	21	13th
2026	Lamborghini Super Trofeo North America - Pro	Forty7 Motorsports	4	0	0	0	0	9	20th
2026	Zenith Racing Series - ZP2	Automatic Racing	3	0	*	*	2	*	*
2026	NASCAR Craftsman Truck Series	Team Reaume	5	0	0	0	0	54	47th

* Season still in progress.

=== American open-wheel racing results ===
==== U.S. F2000 National Championship ====
(key) (Races in bold indicate pole position) (Races in italics indicate fastest lap) (Races with * indicate most race laps led)

Year	Team	1	2	3	4	5	6	7	8	9	10	11	12	13	14	15	16	17	18	Rank	Points
2021	Jay Howard Driver Development	ALA; 1; 12	ALA; 2; 14	STP; 1; 14	STP; 2; 18	IMS; 1; 26	IMS; 2 DNS	IMS; 3; 9	LOR; 18	ROA; 1; 23	ROA; 2; 18	MOH; 1; 18	MOH; 2; 26	MOH; 3; 13	NJMP; 1	NJMP; 2	NJMP; 3	MOH; 4; 18	MOH; 5; 12	18th	73
2022	Cape Motorsports	STP; 1; 12	STP; 2; 7	ALA; 1; 17	ALA; 2; 9	IMS; 1; 16	IMS; 2; 11	IMS; 3; 15	IRP; 12	ROA; 1; 16	ROA; 2; 14	MOH; 1; 12	MOH; 2; 10	MOH; 3; 18	TOR; 1	TOR; 2	POR; 1	POR; 2	POR; 3	15th	109

==== USF Pro 2000 Championship ====
(key) (Races in bold indicate pole position) (Races in italics indicate fastest lap) (Races with * indicate most race laps led)

Year	Team	1	2	3	4	5	6	7	8	9	10	11	12	13	14	15	16	17	18	Rank	Points
2023	Turn 3 Motorsport	STP; 1; 11	STP; 2; 15	SEB; 1; 13	SEB; 2; 5	IMS; 1; 9	IMS; 2; 18	IRP; 12	ROA; 1; 17	ROA; 2; 18	MOH; 1; 14	MOH; 2; 20	TOR; 1	TOR; 2	COTA; 1	COTA; 1	POR; 1	POR; 2	POR; 3	21st	84

=== NASCAR ===
(key) (Bold – Pole position awarded by qualifying time. Italics – Pole position earned by points standings or practice time. * – Most laps led.)

==== Craftsman Truck Series ====
NASCAR Craftsman Truck Series results
Year	Team	No.	Make	1	2	3	4	5	6	7	8	9	10	11	12	13	14	15	16	17	18	19	20	21	22	23	24	25	NCTC	Pts	Ref
2026	Team Reaume	22	Ford	DAY	ATL	STP; 29	DAR	CAR	BRI	TEX																			47th	54	
2026	Team Reaume	2	Ford								GLN; 26	DOV	CLT	NSH	MCH	COR; 27	LRP; 13	NWS	IRP	RCH	NHA	BRI	KAN	CLT					47th	54	
2026	Team Reaume	23	Ford																						PHO; 36	TAL	MAR	HOM	47th	54	

* Season still in progress.
